= Electoral results for the North-Eastern Metropolitan Region =

This is a list of electoral results for the North-Eastern Metropolitan Region (formerly the Eastern Metropolitan Region until 2022) in Victorian state elections from the region's creation in 2006 until the present.

== Election results ==
=== Elections in the 2020s ===
==== 2022 ====
Labor and the Liberal Party were defending two seats each. The Transport Matters Party were defending one seat.

2022 Victorian state election: North-Eastern Metropolitan
Party	Candidate	Votes	%	±%
Quota		80,147		
Labor	1. Shaun Leane (elected 1); 2. Sonja Terpstra (elected 3); 3. Nildhara Gadani; 4. Rana Shahid Javed; 5. Kieran Simpson	162,183	33.73	−3.24
Liberal	1. Matthew Bach (elected 2); 2. Nick McGowan (elected 4); 3. Kirsten Langford; 4. Irene Ling; 5. Sally Houguet	145,788	30.32	−5.81
Greens	1. Aiv Puglielli (elected 5); 2. Sophia Sun; 3. Liz Chase; 4. Asher Cookson; 5. Sarah Newman	49,934	10.38	+1.39
Democratic Labour	1. Hugh Dolan; 2. Brenton van der Ende; 3. George Tsingopoulos; 4. James Tra	25,055	5.21	+3.51
Liberal Democrats	1. Maya Tesa; 2. Josh Lay	20,379	4.24	+0.07
Legalise Cannabis	1. Nicholas Wallis; 2. Anna Negri	15,357	3.19	+3.19
Family First	1. Alister Cameron; 2. Nina van Strijp	10,063	2.09	+2.09
Animal Justice	1. Chris Delforce; 2. Angel Aleksov	6,799	1.41	−0.99
Justice	1. Judith Thompson; 2. Annette Philpott	6,759	1.41	−1.12
One Nation	1. Peter Richardson; 2. William Turner	6,086	1.27	+1.27
Reason	1. Nina Springle; 2. Francis Cairns	4,774	0.99	−0.20
Freedom	1. Greg Cheesman; 2. Daniella Heatherich	4,684	0.97	+0.97
Shooters, Fishers, Farmers	1. Chris Banhidy; 2. Hugh Hanson	4,401	0.92	−0.33
Sack Dan Andrews	1. Serife Cobankara; 2. Husyin Cobankara	3,236	0.67	+0.67
Health Australia	1. Leesa Michelle Munro; 2. Andrew Hicks	3,171	0.66	+0.08
Victorian Socialists	1. Lucas Moore; 2. Lillian Kopschewa	2,585	0.54	+0.09
United Australia	1. Nathan Scaglione; 2. Irene Zivkovic	2,436	0.51	+0.51
Sustainable Australia	1. Jack Corcoran; 2. William Clow	1,875	0.39	−0.42
Companions and Pets	1. Craig Reid; 2. Julia Jones	1,738	0.36	+0.36
Angry Victorians	1. Wally Edwards; 2. Joe Gianfriddo	1,673	0.35	+0.35
Transport Matters	1. Rod Barton; 2. Kim Guest	1,023	0.21	−0.41
New Democrats	1. Darshan Lal Jaisinghani; 2. Rajat Garg; 3. Pushpdeep Narang	879	0.18	+0.18
Total formal votes		480,878	97.21	+0.33
Informal votes		13,484	2.79	−0.33
Turnout		494,672	91.68	−2.04

=== Elections in the 2010s ===
==== 2018 ====
The Liberal Party were defending three seats while the Greens and Labor were defending one each.

2018 Victorian state election: Eastern Metropolitan
Party	Candidate	Votes	%	±%
Quota		69,756		
Labor	1. Shaun Leane (elected 1); 2. Sonja Terpstra (elected 3); 3. Nildhara Gadani; 4. Abhimanyu Kumar; 5. Barry Terzic	154,716	36.97	+8.30
Liberal	1. Mary Wooldridge (elected 2); 2. Bruce Atkinson (elected 4); 3. Emanuele Cicchiello; 4. Grace Roy; 5. Shilpa Hegde	151,216	36.13	−9.59
Greens	1. Samantha Dunn; 2. Helen Harris; 3. Liezl Shnookal; 4. Monique Edwards; 5. Daniela Tymms	37,650	8.99	−1.49
Liberal Democrats	1. Brenton Ford; 2. Marcos Fernandes	17,452	4.17	+2.83
Justice	1. Linda De Rango; 2. Kathryn Lavell	10,583	2.53	+2.53
Animal Justice	1. Rosemary Lavin; 2. Theresa Weymouth	10,031	2.40	+0.69
Democratic Labour	1. Jeremy Orchard; 2. Benjamin Cronshaw	7,097	1.70	−0.59
Shooters, Fishers, Farmers	1. Monique Ruyter; 2. Grant Poulton	5,245	1.25	+0.42
Reason	1. Douglas Leitch; 2. Glenn Lynch	4,996	1.19	−0.86
Voluntary Euthanasia	1. Dermot Ryan; 2. Tara Nipe	3,722	0.89	−0.19
Sustainable Australia	1. Lynnette Saloumi; 2. Perrin Wilkins	3,400	0.81	+0.81
Transport Matters	1. Rod Barton (elected 5); 2. Toni Peters	2,590	0.62	+0.62
Health Australia	1. Andrew Hicks; 2. Gabrielle Brodie	2,426	0.58	+0.58
Aussie Battler	1. Bryce Larson; 2. Clyde Sterry	2,231	0.53	+0.53
Liberty Alliance	1. Indhira Bivieca Aquino; 2. Royston Wilding	1,930	0.46	+0.46
Victorian Socialists	1. Norrian Rundle; 2. Liam Ward	1,887	0.45	+0.45
Country	1. Mil Erikozu; 2. Russel Proud	1184	0.28	−0.14
Hudson for Northern Victoria	1. Shelley van Luenen; 2. Deidre Bailey	176	0.04	+0.04
Total formal votes		418,532	96.88	−0.31
Informal votes		13,484	3.12	+0.31
Turnout		432,016	91.68	−2.04

==== 2014 ====
2014 Victorian state election: Eastern Metropolitan
Party	Candidate	Votes	%	±%
Quota		70,578		
Liberal	1. Mary Wooldridge (elected 1); 2. Bruce Atkinson (elected 3); 3. Richard Dalla-Riva (elected 4); 4. Grace Roy; 5. Shilpa Hegde	193,615	45.72	−4.21
Labor	1. Shaun Leane (elected 2); 2. Brian Tee; 3. Dimity Paul; 4. Lauren Johnson	121,429	28.67	−2.36
Greens	1. Samantha Dunn (elected 5); 2. Helen Harris; 3. Anthony Aulsebrook; 4. Linda Laos; 5. Christopher Kearney	44,357	10.48	−1.81
Democratic Labour	1. Pat Shea; 2. Paul Jakubik	9,716	2.29	−0.22
Sex Party	1. Stephen Barber; 2. Nelson Barber	8,689	2.05	+2.05
Animal Justice	1. Brenton Edgecombe; 2. Rosemary Lavin	7,239	1.71	+1.71
Christians	1. Vickie Janson; 2. Jeff Reaney	6,814	1.61	+1.61
Family First	1. Martin Myszka; 2. Andrew Conlon	5,736	1.35	−1.51
Liberal Democrats	1. Abe Salt; 2. Joel Moore	5,660	1.34	+1.34
Palmer United	1. Milton Wilde; 2. Brooke Brenner	5,560	1.31	+1.31
Voluntary Euthanasia	1. David Scanlon; 2. Monte Bonwick	4,576	1.08	+1.08
Shooters and Fishers	1. Kostandinos Giannikos; 2. Sean Anderson	3,510	0.83	+0.83
Cyclists	1. Neil Cameron; 2. Shane Bebe	2,059	0.49	+0.49
Country Alliance	1. Michael Barclay; 2. Trevor Kloprogge	1,784	0.42	+0.42
Rise Up Australia	1. Barry Fitzsimons; 2. Paul Barbieri	1,419	0.34	+0.34
People Power Victoria	1. Lou Coppola; 2. Alexander Buth	1,300	0.31	+0.31
Total formal votes		423,463	97.19	
Informal votes		12,222	2.81	
Turnout		435,685	93.72	

==== 2010 ====
2010 Victorian state election: Eastern Metropolitan
Party	Candidate	Votes	%	±%
Quota		64,936		
Liberal	1. Richard Dalla-Riva (elected 1); 2. Bruce Atkinson (elected 3); 3. Jan Kronberg (elected 4); 4. Grace Tse; 5. Miriam Rawson	201,337	51.7	+6.9
Labor	1. Shaun Leane (elected 2); 2. Brian Tee (elected 5); 3. Anne Paul; 4. Hayley Clarke; 5. Paul Vout	118,679	30.5	−5.5
Greens	1. Damian Magner; 2. Linda Laos; 3. David Howell; 4. Nell Potter; 5. Howard Tankey	44,621	11.5	+1.0
Family First	1. Peter Lake; 2. Gillian Schwab; 3. Phil Goodman; 4. Yuli Goh	12,153	3.1	−1.3
Democratic Labor	1. Pat La Manna; 2. Stefan Kos; 3. Beverley Price; 4. Simon Costa; 5. Gregory Byrne	10,161	2.6	+1.0
Group G	1. Elizabeth Hartmann; 2. Leane Leggo	1,581	0.4	+0.4
Group C	1. Anthony Osborne; 2. Laurinda Osborne	1,079	0.3	+0.3
Total formal votes		389,611	97.1	+0.2
Informal votes		11,465	2.9	−0.2
Turnout		401,076	94.1	+0.1

=== Elections in the 2000s ===
==== 2006 ====
2006 Victorian state election: Eastern Metropolitan
Party	Candidate	Votes	%	±%
Quota		62,658		
Liberal	1. Richard Dalla-Riva (elected 1); 2. Bruce Atkinson (elected 3); 3. Jan Kronberg (elected 5); 4. Gladys Liu; 5. Matthew Koce	168,583	44.8	+0.5
Labor	1. Shaun Leane (elected 2); 2. Brian Tee (elected 4); 3. Andrew McKenzie; 4. Coral Delarue; 5. Mike Symon	135,264	36.0	−7.4
Greens	1. Bill Pemberton; 2. Kiera Perrott; 3. Nina Scott; 4. Howard Tankey; 5. Janet Powell	39,587	10.5	0.0
Family First	1. Chris Willis; 2. May Ng; 3. Fiona Bronte; 4. John Bridge; 5. Pat Murray	16,670	4.4	+4.4
Democratic Labor	1. Greg Byrne; 2. Ken Wells	5,837	1.6	+1.6
Democrats	1. Craig Beale; 2. Mary Dettman; 3. Rachel Aza	5,225	1.4	+0.8
People Power	1. Karin Open; 2. John Giles	4,781	1.3	+1.3
Total formal votes		375,947	96.9	+0.2
Informal votes		12,179	3.1	−0.2
Turnout		388,126	94.0	
