= Results of the 2014 Victorian state election (Legislative Council) =

Australian state election results

2014 Victorian state election (Legislative Council)
- 29 October 2014

All 40 seats on the Legislative Council 20 seats needed for a majority
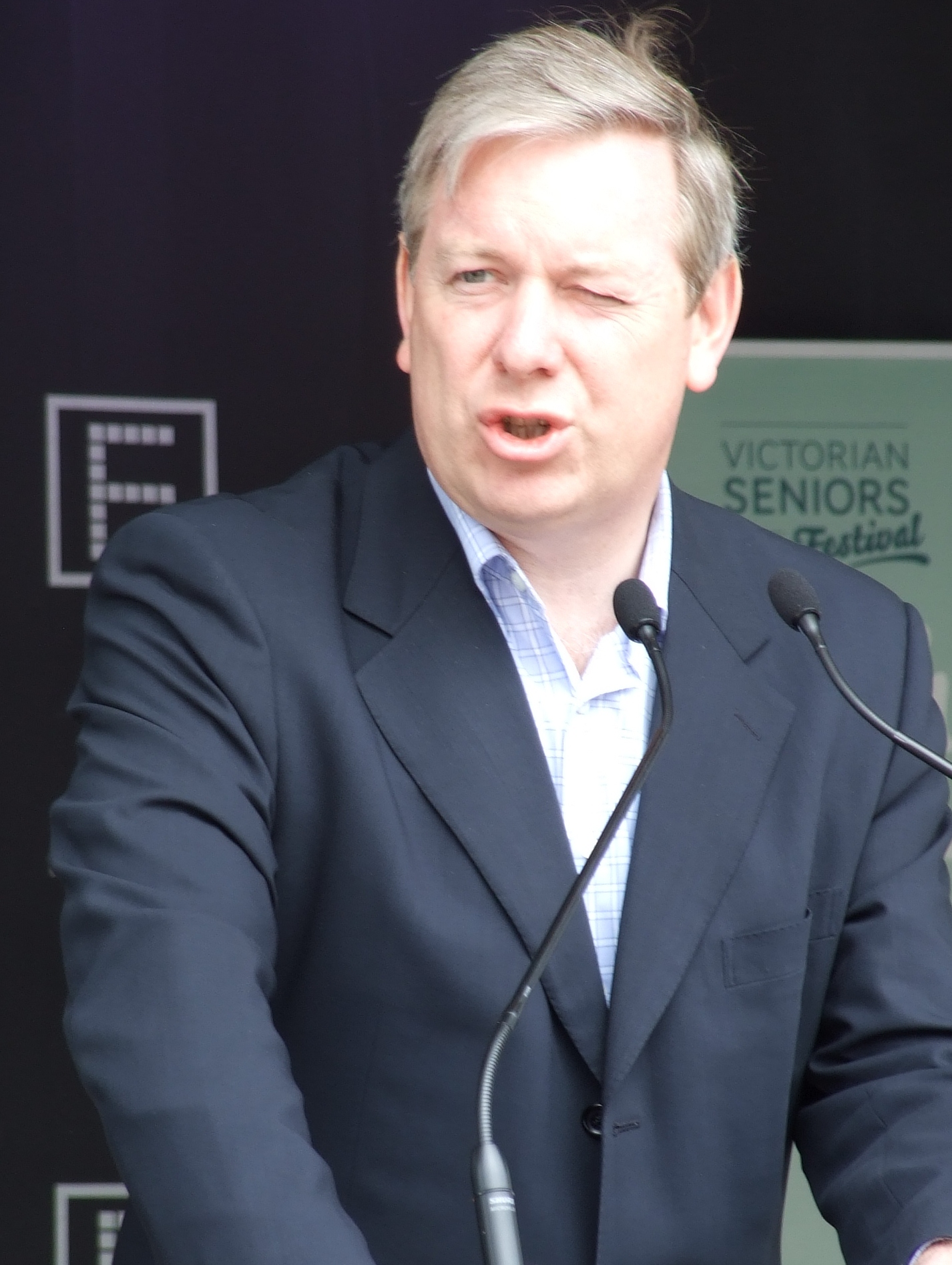

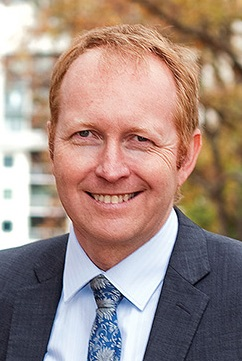

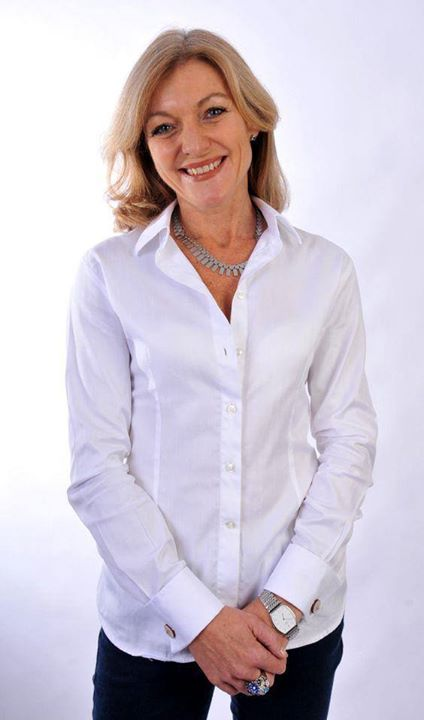
	First party	Second party	Third party
Leader	David Davis	Gavin Jennings	Greg Barber
Party	Coalition	Labor	Greens
Leader's seat	Southern Metro	South-Eastern Metro	Northern Metro
Seats before	21	16	3
Seats won	16	14	5
Seat change	▼5	▼2	▲2
Popular vote	1,235,114	1,143,834	367,728
Percentage	36.13%	33.46%	10.76%
Swing	▼7.03pp	▼1.91pp	▼1.25pp
	Fourth party	Fifth party	Sixth party
	SFF		DLP
Leader	None	Fiona Patten	None
Party	SFF	Sex	Democratic Labour
Leader's seat	—	Northern Metro (won seat)	—
Seats before	0	0	0
Seats won	2	1	1
Seat change	▲2	▲1	▲1
Popular vote	56,555	89,774	79,291
Percentage	1.65%	2.63%	2.32%
Swing	▲1.65pp	▲0.71pp	▼0.02pp
	Seventh party
	V1LJ
Leader	James Purcell
Party	Local Jobs
Leader's seat	Western (won seat)
Seats before	—
Seats won	1
Seat change	New
Popular vote	7,111
Percentage	0.21%
Swing	New
- Results by region

This is a list of Legislative Council results for the Victorian 2014 state election.

The Shooters, Fishers and Farmers Party would win its first seat in the Legislative Council The party would win a seat at every election since.

== Results by region ==
=== Eastern Metropolitan ===
2014 Victorian state election: Eastern Metropolitan
Party	Candidate	Votes	%	±%
Quota		70,578		
Liberal	1. Mary Wooldridge (elected 1); 2. Bruce Atkinson (elected 3); 3. Richard Dalla-Riva (elected 4); 4. Grace Roy; 5. Shilpa Hegde	193,615	45.72	−4.21
Labor	1. Shaun Leane (elected 2); 2. Brian Tee; 3. Dimity Paul; 4. Lauren Johnson	121,429	28.67	−2.36
Greens	1. Samantha Dunn (elected 5); 2. Helen Harris; 3. Anthony Aulsebrook; 4. Linda Laos; 5. Christopher Kearney	44,357	10.48	−1.81
Democratic Labour	1. Pat Shea; 2. Paul Jakubik	9,716	2.29	−0.22
Sex Party	1. Stephen Barber; 2. Nelson Barber	8,689	2.05	+2.05
Animal Justice	1. Brenton Edgecombe; 2. Rosemary Lavin	7,239	1.71	+1.71
Christians	1. Vickie Janson; 2. Jeff Reaney	6,814	1.61	+1.61
Family First	1. Martin Myszka; 2. Andrew Conlon	5,736	1.35	−1.51
Liberal Democrats	1. Abe Salt; 2. Joel Moore	5,660	1.34	+1.34
Palmer United	1. Milton Wilde; 2. Brooke Brenner	5,560	1.31	+1.31
Voluntary Euthanasia	1. David Scanlon; 2. Monte Bonwick	4,576	1.08	+1.08
Shooters and Fishers	1. Kostandinos Giannikos; 2. Sean Anderson	3,510	0.83	+0.83
Cyclists	1. Neil Cameron; 2. Shane Bebe	2,059	0.49	+0.49
Country Alliance	1. Michael Barclay; 2. Trevor Kloprogge	1,784	0.42	+0.42
Rise Up Australia	1. Barry Fitzsimons; 2. Paul Barbieri	1,419	0.34	+0.34
People Power Victoria	1. Lou Coppola; 2. Alexander Buth	1,300	0.31	+0.31
Total formal votes		423,463	97.19	
Informal votes		12,222	2.81	
Turnout		435,685	93.72	

=== Eastern Victoria ===
2014 Victorian state election: Eastern Victoria
Party	Candidate	Votes	%	±%
Quota		72,799		
Liberal/National Coalition	1. Edward O'Donohue (elected 1); 2. Danny O'Brien (elected 3); 3. Andrew Ronalds; 4. Laetitia Jones; 5. Brenton Wright	181,578	41.57	−11.53
Labor	1. Harriet Shing (elected 2); 2. Daniel Mulino (elected 5); 3. Ian Maxfield; 4. John Anderson; 5. Sorina Grasso	126,667	29.00	+0.61
Greens	1. Andrea Millsom; 2. Louis Delacretaz; 3. Belinda Rogers; 4. Willisa Hogarth; 5. Malcolm Brown	37,053	8.48	−1.80
Liberal Democrats	1. Jim McDonald; 2. Ben Buckley	20,712	4.74	+4.74
Sex Party	1. Ange Hopkins; 2. Ken Hill	10,883	2.49	+2.49
Shooters and Fishers	1. Jeff Bourman (elected 4); 2. David Fent	10,660	2.44	+2.44
Palmer United	1. Sarah Taylor; 2. James Unkles; 3. Daniel Gaylor	10,168	2.33	+2.33
Animal Justice	1. Kristin Bacon; 2. Leah Folloni	8,290	1.90	+1.90
Family First	1. Trudie Morris; 2. Joanne Di Lorenzo	7,372	1.69	−1.59
Voluntary Euthanasia	1. Meg Paul; 2. Bruce Miller	5,288	1.21	+1.21
Christians	1. Ash Belsar; 2. Vivian Hill	4,470	1.02	+1.02
Country Alliance	1. Andrew Jones; 2. Bradley Johnstone	4,293	0.98	−2.15
Democratic Labour	1. Gary Jenkins; 2. Andrew Kis-Rogo	3,080	0.71	−1.23
Rise Up Australia	1. Yvonne Gentle; 2. Jim Gentle	2,555	0.58	+0.58
People Power Victoria	1. Linton Young; 2. Maureen Kirsch	1,825	0.42	+0.42
Cyclists	1. Nick Burke; 2. Geoff Ballard	1,518	0.35	+0.35
Independent	Rhonda Crooks	154	0.04	+0.04
Independent	Christine Sindt	146	0.03	+0.03
Independent	Jean-Michel David	49	0.01	+0.01
Independent	Jeff Bartram	27	0.01	+0.01
Total formal votes		436,788	97.04	
Informal votes		13,335	2.96	
Turnout		450,123	93.96	

=== Northern Metropolitan ===
2014 Victorian state election: Northern Metropolitan
Party	Candidate	Votes	%	±%
Quota		68,667		
Labor	1. Jenny Mikakos (elected 1); 2. Nazih Elasmar (elected 4); 3. Burhan Yigit; 4. Martin Appleby	166,412	40.39	−4.37
Liberal	1. Craig Ondarchie (elected 2); 2. Gladys Liu; 3. Amandeep Rosha; 4. David Mulholland; 5. Susan Turner	90,071	21.86	−2.77
Greens	1. Greg Barber (elected 3); 2. Alex Bhathal; 3. Alison Parkes; 4. Anthony Williams; 5. Gurm Sekhon	76,476	18.56	−0.17
Democratic Labour	1. Michael Murphy; 2. Mark Galvin	12,126	2.94	+0.00
Sex Party	1. Fiona Patten (elected 5); 2. Joel Murray	11,840	2.87	−0.98
Family First	1. Brendan Fenn; 2. Sarah Clark	7,968	1.93	−0.63
The Basics Rock 'n' Roll	1. Kris Schroeder; 2. Tim Heath	6,340	1.54	+1.54
Animal Justice	1. Bruce Poon; 2. Maria McLaverty	6,205	1.51	+1.51
Liberal Democrats	1. David Limbrick; 2. Erin Murphy	6,083	1.48	+1.48
Christians	1. Maria Bengtsson; 2. John Carter	5,670	1.38	+1.38
Palmer United	1. Maria Rigoni; 2. Mario Laing	4,899	1.19	+1.19
Shooters and Fishers	1. Christos Tzelepis; 2. Justin Rogan	4,476	1.09	+1.09
Cyclists	1. Nik Dow; 2. Geoff Cicuto	3,384	0.82	+0.82
Group N	1. Peter Allan; 2. Nicola Thomson; 3. Nicole Batch	1,988	0.48	+0.48
Voice for the West	1. Phil Cleary; 2. Emma Phillips	1,969	0.48	+0.48
Vote 1 Local Jobs	1. Nathan Purcell; 2. Aaron Purcell	1,487	0.36	+0.36
Rise Up Australia	1. Michael Mastrantuono; 2. Simon Hay	1,349	0.33	+0.33
Voluntary Euthanasia	1. Bertha Franklin; 2. Jay Franklin	1,226	0.30	+0.30
People Power Victoria	1. Marc Florio; 2. Sheriden Tate; 3. Anne Paten	1,157	0.28	+0.28
Country Alliance	1. Domenic Greco; 2. Evan Spanos	651	0.16	−0.34
Save The Planet	Tiffany Harrison	177	0.04	+0.04
Independent	Darren Bain	44	0.01	+0.01
Total formal votes		411,998	94.73	
Informal votes		22,932	5.27	
Turnout		434,930	91.06	

=== Northern Victoria ===
2014 Victorian state election: Northern Victoria
Party	Candidate	Votes	%	±%
Quota		72,936		
Liberal/National Coalition	1. Wendy Lovell (elected 1); 2. Damian Drum (elected 3); 3. Amanda Millar; 4. Paul Weller; 5. Adrian Wolter	180,177	41.17	−7.22
Labor	1. Steve Herbert (elected 2); 2. Jaclyn Symes (elected 5); 3. Jamie Byron; 4. Lydia Senior; 5. Kate Sutherland	115,458	26.38	−1.10
Greens	1. Jenny O'Connor; 2. Michelle Goldsmith; 3. Kate Toll; 4. Dennis Black; 5. Robin Rhodes	33,627	7.68	−1.05
Democratic Labour	1. Gerard Murphy; 2. Stefan Kos	18,183	4.16	+2.58
Shooters and Fishers	1. Daniel Young (elected 4); 2. Anthony Donnellon	15,303	3.50	+3.50
Sex Party	1. Charlie Crutchfield; 2. Amy Mulcahy	14,325	3.27	−0.28
Palmer United	1. Hans Paas; 2. Owen Lysaght	12,631	2.89	+2.89
Family First	1. Alan Howard; 2. Jamie Baldwin	12,541	2.87	−0.04
Country Alliance	1. Robert Danieli; 2. Steven Threlfall	10,912	2.49	−4.31
Liberal Democrats	1. Tim Wilms; 2. Stephen Gream	10,279	2.35	+2.35
Animal Justice	1. Lola Currie; 2. Jethro Dean	7,759	1.77	+1.77
Rise Up Australia	1. Tim Middleton; 2. Petra Parker	2,743	0.63	+0.63
Cyclists	1. Mark Horner; 2. Arwen Birch	2,245	0.51	+0.51
People Power Victoria	1. Elizabeth Crooks; 2. John Cornish	1,431	0.33	+0.33
Total formal votes		437,614	97.25	
Informal votes		12,375	2.75	
Turnout		449,989	93.81	

=== South Eastern Metropolitan ===
2014 Victorian state election: South Eastern Metropolitan
Party	Candidate	Votes	%	±%
Quota		70,159		
Labor	1. Gavin Jennings (elected 1); 2. Adem Somyurek (elected 3); 3. Lee Tarlamis; 4. Ian Spencer; 5. Rosalie Davis	168,803	40.10	−2.92
Liberal	1. Gordon Rich-Phillips (elected 2); 2. Inga Peulich (elected 4); 3. Ali Khan; 4. Moti Visa; 5. George Hua	148,236	35.21	−6.16
Greens	1. Nina Springle (elected 5); 2. Chris Jobe; 3. Wendy Smith; 4. John Flanders; 5. Stefan Zibell	26,489	6.29	−2.20
Sex Party	1. Martin Leahy; 2. Alex Chevallier	11,239	2.67	+2.67
Family First	1. Lynette Harland; 2. Jeremy Orchard	11,229	2.67	−0.61
Democratic Labour	1. Michael Pulma; 2. Lucia De Summa	9,345	2.22	−0.47
Palmer United	1. Jason Kennedy; 2. Bobby Singh; 3. Michael Oldfield	8,330	1.98	+1.98
Animal Justice	1. Elio Celotto; 2. Tyson Jack	7,840	1.86	+1.86
Liberal Democrats	1. Leslie Hughes; 2. Matthew Lesich	7,300	1.73	+1.73
Christians	1. Sami Greiss; 2. Manal Dawoud	5,656	1.34	+1.34
Rise Up Australia	1. Daniel Nalliah; 2. Rosalie Crestani	5,324	1.26	+1.26
Shooters and Fishers	1. Ryan Perry; 2. Allan Bevan	5,211	1.24	+1.24
Voluntary Euthanasia	1. Sorin Ionascu; 2. Greg Mauldon	2,408	0.57	+0.57
People Power Victoria	1. Basil Waters; 2. Maria Sirianni	1,824	0.43	+0.43
Cyclists	1. Robert Siddle; 2. Troy Parsons	1,636	0.39	+0.39
Independent	Arif Okil	81	0.02	+0.02
Total formal votes		420,951	96.09	
Informal votes		17,121	3.91	
Turnout		438,072	92.87	

=== Southern Metropolitan ===
2014 Victorian state election: Southern Metropolitan
Party	Candidate	Votes	%	±%
Quota		69,033		
Liberal	1. David Davis (elected 1); 2. Georgie Crozier (elected 3); 3. Margaret Fitzherbert (elected 5); 4. Ken Ong; 5. Nellie Khoroshina	176,945	42.72	−8.86
Labor	1. Philip Dalidakis (elected 2); 2. Erik Locke; 3. Raff Ciccone; 4. Cassandra Devine; 5. Will Fowles	104,365	25.20	−0.14
Greens	1. Sue Pennicuik (elected 4); 2. James Searle; 3. Rose Read; 4. Lorna Wyatt; 5. James Harrison	64,364	15.54	−0.78
Liberal Democrats	1. Craig Bonsor; 2. Michelle Hamilton	19,075	4.61	+4.61
Sex Party	1. Francesca Collins; 2. Darren Austin	10,062	2.43	−0.69
Democratic Labour	1. Vince Stefano; 2. Brendan Prendergast	8,971	2.17	+0.36
Animal Justice	1. Nyree Walshe; 2. Fiona McRostie	6,829	1.65	+1.65
Cyclists	1. Richard Bowen; 2. Kathryn Siddle; 3. Marcus Barber	4,749	1.15	+1.15
Palmer United	1. Dwayne Singleton; 2. Anthony Cresswell; 3. Scott Rankin	3,753	0.91	+0.91
Voluntary Euthanasia	1. Penny McCasker; 2. Fiona Stewart	3,271	0.79	+0.79
Christians	1. Faliana Lee; 2. Ian Dobby	2,854	0.69	+0.69
Family First	1. Shane Clark; 2. Gary Coombes	2,708	0.65	−0.33
Shooters and Fishers	1. Paul William; 2. Steven Zoumis	1,933	0.47	+0.47
People Power Victoria	1. Kenneth Miller; 2. Linda Jones	1,138	0.27	+0.27
Rise Up Australia	1. Peter Vassiliou; 2. Glenda Powell	1,045	0.25	+0.25
Democrats	1. Clive Jackson; 2. Richard Grummet	801	0.19	+0.19
Group R	1. Luzio Grossi; 2. Crystal James	797	0.19	+0.19
Country Alliance	1. Christopher Morris; 2. Andrew Driscoll	361	0.09	+0.09
Independent	George Neophytou	175	0.04	+0.04
Total formal votes		414,196	97.43	
Informal votes		10,912	2.57	
Turnout		425,108	91.87	

=== Western Metropolitan ===
2014 Victorian state election: Western Metropolitan
Party	Candidate	Votes	%	±%
Quota		72,606		
Labor	1. Cesar Melhem (elected 1); 2. Khalil Eideh (elected 3); 3. Stanley Chiang; 4. George Seitz; 5. Kirsten Psaila	191,607	43.98	−2.16
Liberal	1. Bernie Finn (elected 2); 2. Andrew Elsbury; 3. David Tran; 4. Gayle Murphy; 5. Cassandra Marr	102,681	23.57	−6.85
Greens	1. Colleen Hartland (elected 4); 2. Huong Truong; 3. Dinesh Jayasuriya; 4. Sam Long; 5. Jonathon Marsden	44,991	10.33	−1.55
Liberal Democrats	1. Zeev Vinokurov; 2. Joel Spencer	24,080	5.53	+5.53
Sex Party	1. Vicki Nash; 2. Adrian Trajstman	11,774	2.70	−1.85
Democratic Labour	1. Rachel Carling-Jenkins (elected 5); 2. Michael Freeman	11,183	2.57	−0.53
Palmer United	1. Trevor Dance; 2. Peter Haberecht	9,629	2.21	+2.21
Voice for the West	1. Berhan Ahmed; 2. Kylie Georgiou; 3. John Turner	7,757	1.78	+1.78
Animal Justice	1. Roy Taylor; 2. Douglas Leith	6,620	1.52	+1.52
Family First	1. Jaxon Calder; 2. Rebecca Filliponi	6,355	1.46	−2.23
Christians	1. Geoff Rogers; 2. Kirsten James	5,973	1.37	+1.37
Shooters and Fishers	1. Jake Wilson; 2. Trevor Carstein	5,406	1.24	+1.24
Cyclists	1. Frank Reinthaler; 2. Nick O'Keefe	3,346	0.77	+0.77
Rise Up Australia	1. Jeff Truscott; 2. Charles Rozario	1,754	0.40	+0.40
People Power Victoria	1. Jerry Creaney; 2. Chez Caruso	1,660	0.38	+0.38
Country Alliance	1. Ben Caruso; 2. Andrew Hepner	817	0.19	+0.19
Total formal votes		435,633	95.78	
Informal votes		19,197	4.22	
Turnout		454,830	92.31	

=== Western Victoria ===
2014 Victorian state election: Western Victoria
Party	Candidate	Votes	%	±%
Quota		72,940		
Liberal/National Coalition	1. Simon Ramsay (elected 1); 2. Josh Morris (elected 3); 3. David O'Brien; 4. Jennifer Almeida Reis; 5. Donna Winfield	161,755	36.96	−7.39
Labor	1. Jaala Pulford (elected 2); 2. Gayle Tierney (elected 4); 3. Jacinta Ermacora; 4. John Stewart; 5. Dale Edwards	149,033	34.05	−3.50
Greens	1. Lloyd Davies; 2. Judy Cameron; 3. Linda Zibell; 4. Ricky Lane; 5. Patchouly Paterson	40,235	9.19	−0.62
Palmer United	1. Catriona Thoolen; 2. Gerard Murphy; 3. Cameron Hickey	11,704	2.67	+2.67
Liberal Democrats	1. Mark Thompson; 2. Baydon Beddoe	11,321	2.59	+2.59
Sex Party	1. Jayden Millard; 2. Douglas Leitch	10,925	2.50	+2.50
Shooters and Fishers	1. Nicole Bourman; 2. Megan Winter	10,028	2.29	+2.29
Family First	1. Barry Newton; 2. Julie Gebbing	8,513	1.95	−1.32
Animal Justice	1. Andy Meddick; 2. Jennifer Gamble	7,346	1.68	+1.68
Democratic Labour	1. Mark Farrell; 2. Joanne Schill	6,694	1.53	−0.62
Vote 1 Local Jobs	1. James Purcell (elected 5); 2. Tanya Waterson	5,621	1.28	+1.28
Country Alliance	1. Garry Kerr; 2. Ronald Heath	4,341	0.99	−1.71
Christians	1. Anne Foster; 2. Leo van Veelen	3,720	0.85	+0.85
Cyclists	1. Kathy Francis; 2. Colin Charles	1,762	0.40	+0.40
People Power Victoria	1. Philip Gluyas; 2. Dianne Bell	1,687	0.39	+0.39
Rise Up Australia	1. Michael Keane; 2. Merle Johnston	1,481	0.34	+0.34
Voice for the West	1. Garry Thomas; 2. Johanne Curran	1,338	0.31	+0.31
Independent	Gary Mannion	134	0.03	+0.03
Total formal votes		437,637	97.03	
Informal votes		13,388	2.97	
Turnout		451,025	94.39	

== See also ==
- 2014 Victorian state election
- Candidates of the 2014 Victorian state election
- Members of the Victorian Legislative Council, 2014–2018
