= Results of the 2010 Victorian state election (Legislative Council) =

Australian state election results

Victorian state election, 27 November 2010 Legislative Council << 2006–2014 >>
Enrolled voters	3,582,232				
Votes cast	3,328,861		Turnout	92.93	+0.20
Informal votes	112,475		Informal	3.37	-0.91
Summary of votes by party
Party	Primary votes	%	Swing	Seats	Change
Labor	1,137,461	35.36	-6.09	16	–3
Liberal (metropolitan)	792,702	24.65	+3.35	12	+3
Liberal/National	595,330	18.51	+0.83		
Liberal (country)				6	± 0
National				3	+1
Greens	386,172	12.01	+1.43	3	±0
Family First	91,982	2.86	-0.99	0	±0
Democratic Labor	75,080	2.33	+0.36	0	-1
Sex Party	61,542	1.91	+1.91	0	± 0
Country Alliance	53,149	1.65	+1.20	0	± 0
Christian Democrats	12,322	0.38	+0.18	0	± 0
Other	10,646	0.33		0	± 0
Total	3,216,386			40	

This is a list of Legislative Council results for the Victorian 2010 state election.

== Results by region ==
Upper house seat outcome of the 2010 Victorian state election

=== Eastern Metropolitan ===
2010 Victorian state election: Eastern Metropolitan
Party	Candidate	Votes	%	±%
Quota		64,936		
Liberal	1. Richard Dalla-Riva (elected 1); 2. Bruce Atkinson (elected 3); 3. Jan Kronberg (elected 4); 4. Grace Tse; 5. Miriam Rawson	201,337	51.7	+6.9
Labor	1. Shaun Leane (elected 2); 2. Brian Tee (elected 5); 3. Anne Paul; 4. Hayley Clarke; 5. Paul Vout	118,679	30.5	−5.5
Greens	1. Damian Magner; 2. Linda Laos; 3. David Howell; 4. Nell Potter; 5. Howard Tankey	44,621	11.5	+1.0
Family First	1. Peter Lake; 2. Gillian Schwab; 3. Phil Goodman; 4. Yuli Goh	12,153	3.1	−1.3
Democratic Labor	1. Pat La Manna; 2. Stefan Kos; 3. Beverley Price; 4. Simon Costa; 5. Gregory Byrne	10,161	2.6	+1.0
Group G	1. Elizabeth Hartmann; 2. Leane Leggo	1,581	0.4	+0.4
Group C	1. Anthony Osborne; 2. Laurinda Osborne	1,079	0.3	+0.3
Total formal votes		389,611	97.1	+0.2
Informal votes		11,465	2.9	−0.2
Turnout		401,076	94.1	+0.1

=== Eastern Victoria ===
2010 Victorian state election: Eastern Victoria
Party	Candidate	Votes	%	±%
Quota		69,410		
Liberal/National Coalition	1. Philip Davis (elected 1); 2. Peter Hall (elected 3); 3. Edward O'Donohue (elected 4); 4. Rosemary Hopgood; 5. Jo Crawford-Wynd	219,990	52.8	+5.0
Labor	1. Matt Viney (elected 2); 2. Johan Scheffer (elected 5); 3. Maida Anderson; 4. Hedley Moffat; 5. Ben Maxfield	118,141	28.4	−6.5
Greens	1. Samantha Dunn; 2. Cheryl Wragg; 3. Penelope Swales; 4. Francine Buckley; 5. Andrea Millsom	43,425	10.4	+1.2
Family First	1. Linden Stokes; 2. Terry Aechlimann	13,626	3.3	−1.2
Country Alliance	1. Andrew Jones; 2. Euan Murphy	13,032	3.1	+3.1
Democratic Labor	1. Walter Ius; 2. Robyn Wyatt	8,243	2.0	+0.8
Total formal votes		416,457	97.1	+0.3
Informal votes		12,295	2.9	−0.3
Turnout		428,752	93.9	+0.1

=== Northern Metropolitan ===
2010 Victorian state election: Northern Metropolitan
Party	Candidate	Votes	%	±%
Quota		65,673		
Labor	1. Jenny Mikakos (elected 1); 2. Nazih Elasmar (elected 4); 3. Nathan Murphy; 4. Rhiannon Platt; 5. Peter Smythe	165,259	41.9	−7.1
Liberal	1. Matthew Guy (elected 2); 2. Craig Ondarchie (elected 5); 3. Sam Granleese; 4. Daniel Parsons; 5. Jemma Townson	106,905	27.1	+3.9
Greens	1. Greg Barber (elected 3); 2. Alexandra Bhathal; 3. Fraser Brindley; 4. Samantha Ratnam; 5. Alister Air	75,648	19.2	+2.1
Sex Party	1. Fiona Patten; 2. Douglas Leitch	14,290	3.6	+3.6
Democratic Labor	1. John Kavanagh; 2. Monica Thatcher; 3. Bridget Cashin; 4. Angela Anderson; 5. Michael Travers	10,655	2.7	−2.5
Family First	1. Andrew Conlon; 2. Peter Kerin; 3. Rod Dawson	9,132	2.3	−0.5
Group C	1. Stephen Mayne; 2. Paula Piccinini	3,862	1.0	+1.0
Christian Democrats	1. Vickie Janson; 2. Saleem Arthur	3,533	0.9	+0.9
Group A	1. Joanne Stuart; 2. April Lee	2,331	0.6	+0.6
Country Alliance	1. Kevin Archibald; 2. Chris Morris	2,072	0.5	+0.5
Independent	Adrian Whitehead	348	0.1	+0.1
Total formal votes		394,035	95.3	+1.0
Informal votes		19,235	4.7	−1.0
Turnout		413,270	91.4	+0.3

=== Northern Victoria ===
2010 Victorian state election: Northern Victoria
Party	Candidate	Votes	%	±%
Quota		64,946		
Liberal/National Coalition	1. Wendy Lovell (elected 1); 2. Damian Drum (elected 3); 3. Donna Petrovich (elected 5); 4. Reid Mather; 5. Martin Ireland	190,894	49.0	−1.3
Labor	1. Candy Broad (elected 2); 2. Kaye Darveniza (elected 4); 3. Jamie Byron; 4. Shaun Rosaia; 5. Anthony Sheridan	105,765	27.1	−3.0
Greens	1. David Jones; 2. Helen Robinson; 3. Hans Paas; 4. Kate Toll; 5. Ben Robertson	31,199	8.0	+0.7
Country Alliance	1. Steven Threlfall; 2. Frank Gaylard	26,646	6.8	+4.7
Sex Party	1. Tristram Chellew; 2. Justine Arfaras	14,880	3.8	+3.8
Family First	1. Laurie Wintle; 2. Neville Hunter	11,444	2.9	−0.8
Democratic Labor	1. Mark Royal; 2. John Carty	6,292	1.6	−0.5
Christian Democrats	1. Ewan McDonald; 2. Steve Flanagan	2,553	0.7	+0.2
Total formal votes		389,673	97.2	+1.3
Informal votes		11,220	2.8	−1.3
Turnout		400,893	93.4	+0.1

=== South Eastern Metropolitan ===
2010 Victorian state election: South Eastern Metropolitan
Party	Candidate	Votes	%	±%
Quota		66,157		
Labor	1. Gavin Jennings (elected 1); 2. Adem Somyurek (elected 3); 3. Lee Tarlamis (elected 5); 4. Kelly Liu; 5. Janet Kaylock	172,306	43.4	−6.4
Liberal	1. Gordon Rich-Phillips (elected 2); 2. Inga Peulich (elected 4); 3. Gladys Liu; 4. Ashton Ashokkumar; 5. Tim Cincotta	162,517	40.9	+7.2
Greens	1. Colin Long; 2. Dee-Ann Kelly; 3. Chris Carman; 4. Linda McIver; 5. Daniela Tymms	34,754	8.8	+1.6
Family First	1. Felicity Hemmersbach; 2. Jadah Pleiter	12,560	3.2	−2.1
Democratic Labor	1. Geraldine Gonsalvez; 2. Catherine Dodd; 3. Agnieszka Chlipala; 4. Genevieve Cattell; 5. Helen O'Loghlen	10,202	2.6	+1.7
Christian Democrats	1. Vivian Hill; 2. Wolf Voigt	4,510	1.1	+0.4
Total formal votes		396,939	96.4	+1.6
Informal votes		14,758	3.6	−1.6
Turnout		411,697	92.7	−0.7

=== Southern Metropolitan ===
2010 Victorian state election: Southern Metropolitan
Party	Candidate	Votes	%	±%
Quota		63,562		
Liberal	1. David Davis (elected 1); 2. Andrea Coote (elected 3); 3. Georgie Crozier (elected 4); 4. Jane Hume; 5. Adam Held	196,676	51.6	+5.4
Labor	1. John Lenders (elected 2); 2. Jennifer Huppert; 3. Zoe Edwards; 4. Pablo Salina; 5. Michael Suss	96,404	25.3	−5.9
Greens	1. Sue Pennicuik (elected 5); 2. Neil Pilling; 3. Clare Pilcher; 4. Bruce McPhate; 5. Des Benson	62,285	16.3	+0.6
Sex Party	1. Ken Hill; 2. Danyel Payne	12,364	3.2	+3.2
Democratic Labor	1. Michael Murphy; 2. Brendan Prendergast	6,849	1.8	+0.6
Family First	1. Ashley Trüter; 2. Joyce Khoo	3,620	0.9	−1.3
Christian Democrats	1. Mansel Rogerson; 2. Ray Levick	1,726	0.5	+0.5
Group E	1. Vern Hughes; 2. Suzette Gallagher	1,229	0.3	+0.3
Independent	Mike Cockburn	216	0.1	+0.1
Total formal votes		381,369	97.4	+0.5
Informal votes		10,071	2.6	−0.5
Turnout		391,440	91.7	+1.5

=== Western Metropolitan ===
2010 Victorian state election: Western Metropolitan
Party	Candidate	Votes	%	±%
Quota		70,452		
Labor	1. Martin Pakula (elected 1); 2. Khalil Eideh (elected 3); 3. Bob Smith; 4. Llewellyn Rees; 5. Claudine Spinner	198,100	46.9	−11.8
Liberal	1. Bernie Finn (elected 2); 2. Andrew Elsbury (elected 4); 3. Victoria Fairbairn; 4. Jeremy Barth; 5. William Kenny	125,267	29.6	+5.1
Greens	1. Colleen Hartland (elected 5); 2. Robert Humphreys; 3. Liz Ingham; 4. Simon Crawford; 5. Owen Gale	50,715	12.0	+2.6
Sex Party	1. Joël Murray; 2. Merinda Davis	20,008	4.7	+4.7
Family First	1. Daniel Mumby; 2. Lisa Garay	15,282	3.6	−0.4
Democratic Labor	1. Mark Farrell; 2. Stephanie Mazzarella; 3. Georga Byrne; 4. Samuel Notaro; 5. Marguerita Kavanagh	13,336	3.2	+2.1
Total formal votes		422,708	95.4	+1.7
Informal votes		20,549	4.6	−1.7
Turnout		443,257	92.3	−0.2

=== Western Victoria ===
2010 Victorian state election: Western Victoria
Party	Candidate	Votes	%	±%
Quota		70,933		
Liberal/National Coalition	1. David Koch (elected 1); 2. Simon Ramsay (elected 3); 3. David O'Brien (elected 5); 4. Melanie Dow; 5. Ruby Cameron	184,446	43.3	+2.5
Labor	1. Jaala Pulford (elected 2); 2. Gayle Tierney (elected 4); 3. Richard Morrow; 4. Geoff Dawson; 5. Paul Romas	162,807	38.3	−3.7
Greens	1. Marcus Ward; 2. Judy Cameron; 3. Jamal Blakkarly; 4. Susan Perron; 5. Jean Christie	43,525	10.2	+1.6
Family First	1. Joshua Reimer; 2. Graeme Presser; 3. Trevor Pearce; 4. Jahzeel Concepcion; 5. Jim Rainey	14,165	3.3	−0.6
Country Alliance	1. Miles Hodge; 2. Ron Heath	11,399	2.7	+1.8
Democratic Labor	1. Peter Kavanagh; 2. Steve Campbell; 3. Jane Byrne; 4. Maria Mazzarella; 5. Max Crockett	9,252	2.2	−0.5
Total formal votes		425,594	97.1	+0.7
Informal votes		12,882	2.9	−0.7
Turnout		438,476	94.0	+0.5

== See also ==
- 2010 Victorian state election
- Candidates of the 2010 Victorian state election
