= Members of the Victorian Legislative Council, 2006–2010 =

- ←2002–2006 2010–2014→

This is a list of members of the Victorian Legislative Council, as elected at the 2006 state election.

Name	Party	Province	Term of office
Bruce Atkinson	Liberal	Eastern Metropolitan	1992–present
Greg Barber	Greens	Northern Metropolitan	2006–2017
Hon Candy Broad	Labor	Northern Victoria	1999–2014
Andrea Coote	Liberal	Southern Metropolitan	1999–2014
Richard Dalla-Riva	Liberal	Eastern Metropolitan	2002–2018
Hon Kaye Darveniza	Labor	Northern Victoria	1999–2014
David Davis	Liberal	Southern Metropolitan	1996–present
Philip Davis	Liberal	Eastern Victoria	1992–2014
Damian Drum	National	Northern Victoria	2002–2016
Khalil Eideh	Labor	Western Metropolitan	2006–2018
Nazih Elasmar	Labor	Northern Metropolitan	2006–present
Bernie Finn	Liberal	Western Metropolitan	2006–present
Matthew Guy	Liberal	Northern Metropolitan	2006–2014
Peter Hall	National	Eastern Victoria	1988–2014
Colleen Hartland	Greens	Western Metropolitan	2006–2018
Jennifer Huppert ^{[1]}	Labor	Southern Metropolitan	2009–2010
Hon Gavin Jennings	Labor	South Eastern Metropolitan	1999–2020
Peter Kavanagh	DLP	Western Victoria	2006–2010
David Koch	Liberal	Western Victoria	2002–2014
Jan Kronberg	Liberal	Eastern Metropolitan	2006–2014
Shaun Leane	Labor	Eastern Metropolitan	2006–present
Hon John Lenders	Labor	Southern Metropolitan	2002–2014
Wendy Lovell	Liberal	Northern Victoria	2002–present
Hon Justin Madden	Labor	Western Metropolitan	1999–2010
Hon Jenny Mikakos	Labor	Northern Metropolitan	1999–2020
Nathan Murphy ^{[2]}	Labor	Northern Metropolitan	2010
Edward O'Donohue	Liberal	Eastern Victoria	2006–2021
Martin Pakula	Labor	Western Metropolitan	2006–2013
Sue Pennicuik	Greens	Southern Metropolitan	2006–2018
Donna Petrovich	Liberal	Northern Victoria	2006–2013
Inga Peulich	Liberal	South Eastern Metropolitan	2006–2018
Jaala Pulford	Labor	Western Victoria	2006–present
Gordon Rich-Phillips	Liberal	South Eastern Metropolitan	1999–present
Johan Scheffer	Labor	Eastern Victoria	2002–2014
Bob Smith	Labor	South Eastern Metropolitan	1999–2010
Adem Somyurek	Labor	South Eastern Metropolitan	2002–present
Brian Tee	Labor	Eastern Metropolitan	2006–2014
Hon Theo Theophanous ^{[2]}	Labor	Northern Metropolitan	1988–2010
Evan Thornley ^{[1]}	Labor	Southern Metropolitan	2006–2008
Gayle Tierney	Labor	Western Victoria	2006–present
Matt Viney	Labor	Eastern Victoria	2002–2014
John Vogels	Liberal	Western Victoria	2002–2010

^{1} Southern Metropolitan Labor MLC Evan Thornley resigned on 28 December 2008. Jennifer Huppert was appointed as his replacement on 3 February 2009.
^{2} Northern Metropolitan Labor MLC Theo Theophanous resigned on 1 March 2010. Nathan Murphy was appointed as his replacement on 9 March 2010.
