= Members of the Victorian Legislative Council, 2010–2014 =

- ←2006–2010 2014–2018→

This is a list of members of the Victorian Legislative Council, as elected at the 2010 state election and at subsequent appointments.

Name	Party	Province	Term in office
Bruce Atkinson	Liberal	Eastern Metropolitan	1992–present
Greg Barber	Greens	Northern Metropolitan	2006–2017
Hon Candy Broad ^{[5]}	Labor	Northern Victoria	1999–2014
Andrea Coote	Liberal	Southern Metropolitan	1999–2014
Georgie Crozier	Liberal	Southern Metropolitan	2010–present
Richard Dalla-Riva	Liberal	Eastern Metropolitan	2002–2018
Hon Kaye Darveniza	Labor	Northern Victoria	1999–2014
David Davis	Liberal	Southern Metropolitan	1996–present
Philip Davis^{[3]}	Liberal	Eastern Victoria	1992–2014
Damian Drum	National	Northern Victoria	2002–2016
Khalil Eideh	Labor	Western Metropolitan	2006–2018
Nazih Elasmar	Labor	Northern Metropolitan	2006–present
Andrew Elsbury	Liberal	Western Metropolitan	2010–2014
Bernie Finn	Liberal	Western Metropolitan	2006–present
Matthew Guy	Liberal	Northern Metropolitan	2006–2014
Peter Hall^{[4]}	National	Eastern Victoria	1988–2014
Colleen Hartland	Greens	Western Metropolitan	2006–2018
Hon Gavin Jennings	Labor	South Eastern Metropolitan	1999–2020
David Koch	Liberal	Western Victoria	2002–2014
Jan Kronberg	Liberal	Eastern Metropolitan	2006–2014
Shaun Leane	Labor	Eastern Metropolitan	2006–present
Hon John Lenders	Labor	Southern Metropolitan	2002–2014
Marg Lewis ^{[5]}	Labor	Northern Victoria	2014
Wendy Lovell	Liberal	Northern Victoria	2002–present
Cesar Melhem^{[1]}	Labor	Western Metropolitan	2013–present
Hon Jenny Mikakos	Labor	Northern Metropolitan	1999–2020
Amanda Millar^{[2]}	Liberal	Northern Victoria	2013–2014
Danny O'Brien^{[4]}	National	Eastern Victoria	2014–2015
David O'Brien	National	Western Victoria	2010–2014
Hon Edward O'Donohue	Liberal	Eastern Victoria	2006–2021
Craig Ondarchie	Liberal	Northern Metropolitan	2010–present
Martin Pakula^{[1]}	Labor	Western Metropolitan	2006–2013
Sue Pennicuik	Greens	Southern Metropolitan	2006–2018
Donna Petrovich^{[2]}	Liberal	Northern Victoria	2006–2013
Inga Peulich	Liberal	South Eastern Metropolitan	2006–2018
Jaala Pulford	Labor	Western Victoria	2006–present
Simon Ramsay	Liberal	Western Victoria	2010–2018
Gordon Rich-Phillips	Liberal	South Eastern Metropolitan	1999–present
Andrew Ronalds^{[3]}	Liberal	Eastern Victoria	2014
Johan Scheffer	Labor	Eastern Victoria	2002–2014
Adem Somyurek	Labor	South Eastern Metropolitan	2002–present
Lee Tarlamis	Labor	South Eastern Metropolitan	2010–2014; 2020–present
Brian Tee	Labor	Eastern Metropolitan	2006–2014
Gayle Tierney	Labor	Western Victoria	2006–present
Matt Viney	Labor	Eastern Victoria	2002–2014

^{1} Western Metropolitan Labor MLC Martin Pakula resigned on 26 March 2013. Cesar Melhem was appointed as his replacement on 9 May 2013.
^{2} Northern Victoria Liberal MLC Donna Petrovich resigned on 1 July 2013. Amanda Millar was appointed as her replacement on 22 August 2013.
^{3} Eastern Victoria Liberal MLC Philip Davis resigned on 2 February 2014. Andrew Ronalds was appointed as his replacement on 5 February 2014.
^{4} Eastern Victoria National MLC Peter Hall resigned on 17 March 2014. Danny O'Brien was appointed as his replacement on 26 March 2014.
^{5} Northern Victoria Labor MLC Candy Broad resigned on 9 May 2014. Marg Lewis was appointed as her replacement on 11 June.
