= Members of the Victorian Legislative Council, 2014–2018 =

- ←2010–2014 2018–2022→

This is a list of members of the Victorian Legislative Council, as elected at the 2014 state election.

== Distribution of seats ==
Victorian Legislative Council
Party	Seats
Labor	14
Liberal-National coalition	16
Liberal	14
National	2
Greens	5
Shooters, Fishers and Farmers	2
Democratic Labour	1 ^{[5]}
Sex Party	1
Local Jobs	1
Total	40

Current distribution
Region	Seats held
Eastern Metropolitan	
Eastern Victoria	
Northern Metropolitan	
Northern Victoria	
South-Eastern Metropolitan	
Southern Metropolitan	
Western Metropolitan	
Western Victoria	

== Members ==
Name	Party	Region	Term of office
Bruce Atkinson	Liberal	Eastern Metropolitan	1992–present
Melina Bath ^{[1]}	National	Eastern Metropolitan	2015–present
Greg Barber ^{[4]}	Greens	Northern Metropolitan	2006–2017
Jeff Bourman	Shooters, Fishers and Farmers	Eastern Victoria	2014–present
Rachel Carling-Jenkins ^{[5]}	Democratic Labour/Conservatives/Independent	Western Metropolitan	2014–2018
Georgie Crozier	Liberal	Southern Metropolitan	2010–present
Hon Philip Dalidakis	Labor	Southern Metropolitan	2014–2019
Richard Dalla-Riva	Liberal	Eastern Metropolitan	2002–2018
David Davis	Liberal	Southern Metropolitan	1996–present
Damian Drum ^{[2]}	National	Northern Victoria	2002–2016
Samantha Dunn	Greens	Eastern Metropolitan	2014–2018
Khalil Eideh	Labor	Western Metropolitan	2006–2018
Nazih Elasmar	Labor	Northern Metropolitan	2006–present
Bernie Finn	Liberal	Western Metropolitan	2006–present
Margaret Fitzherbert	Liberal	Southern Metropolitan	2014–2018
Mark Gepp ^{[3]}	Labor	Northern Victoria	2017–present
Colleen Hartland ^{[6]}	Greens	Western Metropolitan	2006–2018
Hon Steve Herbert ^{[3]}	Labor	Northern Victoria	2014–2017
Hon Gavin Jennings	Labor	South Eastern Metropolitan	1999–2020
Shaun Leane	Labor	Eastern Metropolitan	2006–present
Wendy Lovell	Liberal	Northern Victoria	2002–present
Cesar Melhem	Labor	Western Metropolitan	2013–present
Hon Jenny Mikakos	Labor	Northern Metropolitan	1999–2020
Josh Morris	Liberal	Western Victoria	2014–2018
Daniel Mulino	Labor	Eastern Victoria	2014–2018
Danny O'Brien ^{[1]}	National	Eastern Victoria	2014–2015
Hon Edward O'Donohue	Liberal	Eastern Victoria	2006–2021
Craig Ondarchie	Liberal	Northern Metropolitan	2010–present
Luke O'Sullivan ^{[2]}	National	Northern Victoria	2016–2018
Fiona Patten	Sex Party/Reason	Northern Metropolitan	2014–present
Sue Pennicuik	Greens	Southern Metropolitan	2006–2018
Inga Peulich	Liberal	South Eastern Metropolitan	2006–2018
Hon Jaala Pulford	Labor	Western Victoria	2006–present
James Purcell	Local Jobs	Western Victoria	2014–2018
Simon Ramsay	Liberal	Western Victoria	2010–2018
Samantha Ratnam ^{[4]}	Greens	Northern Metropolitan	2017–2024
Gordon Rich-Phillips	Liberal	South Eastern Metropolitan	1999–present
Harriet Shing	Labor	Eastern Victoria	2014–present
Hon Adem Somyurek	Labor	South Eastern Metropolitan	2002–present
Nina Springle	Greens	South Eastern Metropolitan	2014–2018
Jaclyn Symes	Labor	Northern Victoria	2014–present
Hon Gayle Tierney	Labor	Western Victoria	2006–present
Huong Truong ^{[6]}	Greens	Western Metropolitan	2018
Mary Wooldridge	Liberal	Eastern Metropolitan	2014–2019
Daniel Young	Shooters, Fishers and Farmers	Northern Victoria	2014–2018

^{1} Eastern Victoria Nationals MLC Danny O'Brien resigned on 2 February 2015 to contest the by-election for the lower house seat of Gippsland South. Melina Bath was appointed to replace him on 16 April 2015.
^{2} Northern Victoria Nationals MLC Damian Drum resigned on 26 May 2016 to contest the seat of Murray at the 2016 federal election. Luke O'Sullivan was appointed to replace him on 13 October 2016.
^{3} Northern Victoria Labor MLC Steve Herbert resigned on 6 April 2017. Mark Gepp was appointed to replace him on 7 June 2017.
^{4} Northern Metropolitan Greens MLC Greg Barber resigned on 28 September 2017. Samantha Ratnam was appointed to replace him on 19 October 2017.
^{5} Western Metropolitan DLP MLC Rachel Carling-Jenkins changed party affiliation on 26 June 2017, from the DLP to the Australian Conservatives. On 3 August 2018 she resigned from the Conservatives to sit as an independent.
^{6} Western Metropolitan Greens MLC Colleen Hartland resigned on 8 February 2018. Huong Truong was appointed to replace her on 21 February 2018.
