= Members of the Victorian Legislative Council, 2002–2006 =

- ←1999–2002 2006–2010→

This is a list of members of the Victorian Legislative Council from 2002 to 2006, as elected at the 2002 state election:

Name	Party	Province	Term of office
Lidia Argondizzo	Labor	Templestowe	2002–2006
Bruce Atkinson	Liberal	Koonung	1992–present
Bill Baxter	National	North Eastern	1978–1984, 1985–2006
Barry Bishop	National	North Western	1992–2006
Ron Bowden	Liberal	South Eastern	1992–2006
Andrew Brideson	Liberal	Waverley	1992–2006
Hon Candy Broad	Labor	Melbourne North	1999–2014
Helen Buckingham	Labor	Koonung	2002–2006
Elaine Carbines	Labor	Geelong	1999–2006
Andrea Coote	Liberal	Monash	1999–2014
Richard Dalla-Riva	Liberal	East Yarra	2002–2018
Hon Kaye Darveniza	Labor	Melbourne West	1999–2014
David Davis	Liberal	East Yarra	1996–present
Philip Davis	Liberal	Gippsland	1992–2014
Damian Drum	National	North Western	2002–2016
John Eren	Labor	Geelong	2002–2006
Bill Forwood	Liberal	Templestowe	1992–2006
Hon Monica Gould	Labor	Doutta Galla	1993–2006
Dianne Hadden	Labor/Independent ^{[2]}	Ballarat	1999–2006
Peter Hall	National	Gippsland	1988–2014
Geoff Hilton	Labor	Western Port	2002–2006
Carolyn Hirsh	Labor/Ind./ Labor/Ind. ^{[1]}	Silvan	2002–2006
Hon Gavin Jennings	Labor	Melbourne	1999–2020
David Koch	Liberal	Western	2002–2014
Hon John Lenders	Labor	Waverley	2002–2014
Wendy Lovell	Liberal	North Eastern	2002–present
John McQuilten	Labor	Ballarat	1999–2006
Hon Justin Madden	Labor	Doutta Galla	1999–2010
Hon Jenny Mikakos	Labor	Jika Jika	1999–2020
Rob Mitchell	Labor	Central Highlands	2002–2006
Sang Nguyen	Labor	Melbourne West	1996–2006
Andrew Olexander	Liberal/Independent ^{[3]}	Silvan	1999–2006
Noel Pullen	Labor	Higinbotham	2002–2006
Gordon Rich-Phillips	Liberal	Eumemmerring	1999–present
Glenyys Romanes	Labor	Melbourne	1999–2006
Johan Scheffer	Labor	Monash	2002–2014
Bob Smith	Labor	Chelsea	1999–2010
Adem Somyurek	Labor	Eumemmerring	2002–present
Graeme Stoney	Liberal	Central Highlands	1992–2006
Chris Strong	Liberal	Higinbotham	1992–2006
Hon Theo Theophanous	Labor	Jika Jika	1988–2010
Hon Marsha Thomson	Labor	Melbourne North	1999–2006
Matt Viney	Labor	Chelsea	2002–2014
John Vogels	Liberal	Western	2002–2010

^{1} Silvan Province MLC Carolyn Hirsh was forced to resign from the Labor Party in September 2004 after being caught driving without a licence, which she had lost after being booked for drink-driving earlier in the year. She was later readmitted in November 2005, after a failed attempt to rejoin in April, but was subsequently expelled again in June 2006 after another drink-driving incident.
^{2} Ballarat Province MLC Dianne Hadden resigned from the Labor Party on 7 April 2005 and announced her intention to serve out the remainder of her term as an independent.
^{3} Silvan Province MLC Andrew Olexander was dismissed from the parliamentary wing of the Liberal Party on 29 November 2005, due to critical comments made after the decision not to grant him party endorsement to contest the next election after a drink-driving scandal.
