= Battin shadow ministry =

2024 shadow cabinet of Victoria, Australia

The shadow ministry of Brad Battin was the shadow cabinet of Victoria from 27 December 2024 to 18 November 2025, serving in opposition to the government led by Jacinta Allan of the Australian Labor Party. The shadow ministry was the Opposition's alternative to the Allan ministry, sworn in on 2 October 2023. The shadow cabinet was formed following a successful spill motion against John Pesutto on 27 December 2024, replacing his Shadow Ministry. Battin was subsequently elected as Leader of the Liberal Party and hence Leader of the Opposition. His shadow cabinet was unveiled on 7 January 2025.

On 11 October 2025, a reshuffle occurred, following the resignation of senior MPs Michael O'Brien and David Hodgett. On 27 October 2025 the composition outer shadow ministry was announced.

On 18 November 2025, Jess Wilson assumed the leadership of the Liberal Party, hence dissolving the shadow ministry, before being replaced by Wilson's shadow cabinet.

== Composition ==
=== Second arrangement (October 2025 to November 2025) ===
Portrait	Shadow minister	Portfolio	Took office	Left office	Duration of tenure	Party	Electorate
Shadow Cabinet Members
	Brad Battin	Leader of the Opposition; Leader of the Victorian Liberal Party	27 December 2024	18 November 2025	326 days	Liberal	Berwick
	Danny O'Brien	Shadow Minister for Roads and Road Safety; Shadow Minister for Emergency Services; Shadow Minister for Regional Development and Liveability; Deputy Leader of the Victorian Coalition; Leader of the Victorian National Party	25 November 2024	Retained leadership position after ministry dissolved (Note: Wilson has not yet announced the full composition of her shadow cabinet, and many MPs expected to retain their roles.)	358 days	National	Gippsland South
	Sam Groth	Deputy Leader of the Opposition; Shadow Minister for Public Transport; Shadow Minister for Ports and Freight; Shadow Minister for Aviation; Deputy Leader of the Victorian Liberal Party	27 December 2024	Retained deputy leadership position after ministry dissolved	1 year, 313 days	Liberal	Nepean
	Emma Kealy	Shadow Minister for Agriculture; Shadow Minister for Mental Health; Deputy Leader of the Victorian National Party	25 November 2024	Retained deputy leadership position after ministry dissolved	1 year, 345 days	National	Lowan
	Melina Bath	Shadow Minister for Aboriginal Affairs; Shadow Minister for Public Land Management; Leader of The Nationals in the Legislative Council	7 January 2025	18 November 2025	1 year, 302 days	National	MLC for Eastern Victoria Region
	Tim Bull	Shadow Minister for Disability, Ageing, Carers and Volunteers; Shadow Minister for Racing; Shadow Minister for Veterans' Affairs	7 January 2025	18 November 2025	1 year, 302 days	National	Gippsland East
	David Davis	Leader of the Opposition in the Legislative Council; Shadow Minister for Energy and Resources; Shadow Minister for Arts and Creative Industries; Leader of the Victorian Liberal Party in the Legislative Council	27 December 2024	18 November 2025	1 year, 313 days	Liberal	MLC for Southern Metropolitan Region
	Georgie Crozier	Shadow Minister for Health	7 January 2025	18 November 2025	1 year, 302 days	Liberal	MLC for Southern Metropolitan Region
	Matthew Guy	Shadow Minister for Public Transport; Shadow Minister for Transition to Government	7 January 2025	18 November 2025	1 year, 302 days	Liberal	Bulleen
	Bev McArthur	Shadow Minister for Local Government; Shadow Minister for Government Waste	7 January 2025	18 November 2025	1 year, 302 days	Liberal	MLC for Western Victoria Region
	Tim McCurdy	Shadow Minister for Consumer Affairs; Shadow Minister for Water; Shadow Minister for Gaming and Liquor	7 January 2025	18 November 2025	1 year, 302 days	National	Ovens Valley
	Nick McGowan	Shadow Minister for Community Services; Shadow Minister for Victim Support	30 October 2025	18 November 2025		Liberal	MLC for North-Eastern Metropolitan Region
	Cindy McLeish	Shadow Minister for Crime Prevention; Shadow Minister for the Prevention of Family Violence; Shadow Minister for Women	7 January 2025	18 November 2025	1 year, 302 days	Liberal	Eildon
	Evan Mulholland	Deputy Leader of the Opposition in the Legislative Council; Shadow Minister for Education; Shadow Minister for Multicultural and Multifaith Affairs; Deputy Leader of the Victorian Liberal Party in the Legislative Council	27 December 2024	18 November 2025	1 year, 313 days	Liberal	MLC for Northern Metropolitan Region
	James Newbury	Shadow Attorney-General; Shadow Minister for Equality; Shadow Minister for Anti-Corruption; Manager of Opposition Business	7 January 2025	18 November 2025	1 year, 302 days	Liberal	Brighton
	Richard Riordan	Shadow Minister for Planning and Housing; Shadow Minister for Tourism, Sports, Events and Hospitality	7 January 2025	18 November 2025	1 year, 302 days	Liberal	Polwarth
	Brad Rowswell	Shadow Minister for Small and Family Business; Shadow Minister for CBD Revitalisation; Shadow Minister for Government Services and Digital Transformation	7 January 2025	18 November 2025	1 year, 302 days	Liberal	Sandringham
	David Southwick	Shadow Minister for Police and Corrections; Shadow Minister for Crime Prevention	7 January 2025	18 November 2025	1 year, 302 days	Liberal	Caulfield
	Bridget Vallence	Shadow Minister for Finance; Shadow Minister for Trade and Investment; Shadow Minister for WorkSafe and TAC	7 January 2025	18 November 2025	1 year, 302 days	Liberal	Evelyn
	Richard Welch	Shadow Minister for Jobs, Industry and Industrial Relations; Shadow Minister for Manufacturing and Innovation	7 January 2025	18 November 2025	1 year, 302 days	Liberal	MLC for North-Eastern Metropolitan Region
	Nicole Werner	Shadow Minister for Youth Justice; Shadow Minister for Youth and Future Leaders; Shadow Minister for Children	30 October 2025	18 November 2025	1 year, 302 days	Liberal	Warrandyte
	Jess Wilson	Shadow Treasurer	7 January 2025	18 November 2025	1 year, 302 days	Liberal	Kew
Shadow Assistant Ministers
	Annabelle Cleeland	Shadow Assistant Minister for Health				National	Euroa
	Trung Luu	Shadow Assistant Minister for Police; Shadow Assistant Minister for Criminal Justice Reform				Liberal	MLC for Western Metropolitan Region
	Chris Crewther	Shadow Assistant Minister for Public Transport; Shadow Assistant Minister for Multicultural Affairs				Liberal	Mornington
	Renee Heath	Shadow Assistant Minister for Victims and Crime Prevention				Liberal	MLC for Eastern Victoria Region
	Ann-Marie Hermans	Shadow Assistant Minister for Education				Liberal	MLC for South-Eastern Metropolitan Region
	Moira Deeming	Shadow Assistant Minister for Local Government; Leaders Representative for Western Metro Region				Liberal	MLC for the Western Metropolitan Region
	Martin Cameron	Shadow Assistant Minister for Energy Affordability; Shadow Assistant Minister for Small Business (Regional)				National	Morwell
	Wayne Farnham	Shadow Assistant Minister to the Leader of the Opposition; Shadow Assistant Minister for Planning and the Building Industry				Liberal	Narracan
	Kim O'Keeffe	Shadow Assistant Minister for Regional Multicultural Affairs				National	Shepparton

=== First arrangement (to October 2025) ===
Shadow minister	Portfolio	Party	Electorate
Shadow Cabinet Members
Brad Battin	Leader of the Opposition; Shadow Minister for Small Business; Leader of the Victorian Liberal Party	Liberal	Berwick
Danny O'Brien	Shadow Minister for Roads and Road Safety; Shadow Minister for Emergency Services; Shadow Minister for Regional Development and Liveability; Leader of the Victorian National Party	National	Gippsland South
Sam Groth	Deputy Leader of the Opposition; Shadow Special Minister for State; Shadow Minister for Tourism, Sport, Events and Hospitality; Shadow Minister for Outdoor Recreation; Deputy Leader of the Victorian Liberal Party	Liberal	Nepean
Emma Kealy	Shadow Minister for Agriculture; Shadow Minister for Mental Health; Deputy Leader of the Victorian National Party	National	Lowan
David Davis	Leader of the Opposition in the Legislative Council; Shadow Minister for Energy and Resources; Shadow Minister for Financial Integrity and Budget Repair; Leader of the Victorian Liberal Party in the Legislative Council	Liberal	MLC for Southern Metropolitan Region
Evan Mulholland	Deputy Leader of the Opposition in the Legislative Council; Shadow Minister for Arts and Creative Industries; Shadow Minister for Major Projects; Shadow Minister for Multicultural Affairs; Deputy Leader of the Victorian Liberal Party in the Legislative Council	Liberal	MLC for Northern Metropolitan Region
James Newbury	Shadow Treasurer; Shadow Minister for Equality	Liberal	Brighton
Georgie Crozier	Shadow Minister for Health	Liberal	MLC for Southern Metropolitan Region
Matthew Guy	Shadow Minister for Public Transport; Shadow Minister for Transition to Government	Liberal	Bulleen
Jess Wilson	Shadow Minister for Education; Shadow Minister for Industry and Economic Growth	Liberal	Kew
Michael O'Brien	Shadow Attorney-General; Shadow Minister for Victim Support	Liberal	Malvern
Bridget Vallence	Manager of Opposition Business; Shadow Minister for Finance; Shadow Minister for Trade and Investment	Liberal	Evelyn
Tim Bull	Shadow Minister for Disability, Ageing, Carers and Volunteers; Shadow Minister for Racing; Shadow Minister for Veterans Affairs	National	Gippsland East
Brad Rowswell	Shadow Minister for Digital Transformation and Public Service Innovation; Shadow Minister for Environment	Liberal	Sandringham
Richard Riordan	Shadow Minister for Planning; Shadow Minister for Housing	Liberal	Polwarth
Bev McArthur	Shadow Minister for Local Government; Shadow Minister for Scrutiny of Government	Liberal	MLC for Western Victoria Region
Tim McCurdy	Shadow Minister for Consumer Affairs; Shadow Minister for Water; Shadow Minister for Gaming and Liquor	National	Ovens Valley
Melina Bath	Shadow Minister for Aboriginal Affairs; Shadow Minister for Public Land Management; Leader of The Nationals in the Legislative Council	National	MLC for Eastern Victoria Region
David Southwick	Shadow Minister for Police and Corrections; Shadow Minister for Youth and Future Leaders; Shadow Minister for Youth Justice	Liberal	Caulfield
Cindy McLeish	Shadow Minister for Crime Prevention; Shadow Minister for the Prevention of Family Violence; Shadow Minister for Women	Liberal	Eildon
David Hodgett	Shadow Minister for Crime Prevention; Shadow Minister for the Prevention of Family Violence; Shadow Minister for Women	Liberal	Croydon
Roma Britnell	Shadow Minister for Ports and Freight; Shadow Minister for Child Protection	Liberal	South-West Coast
Joe McCracken	Shadow Cabinet Secretary	Liberal	MLC for Western Victoria Region
Shadow Assistant Ministers
Annabelle Cleeland	Shadow Assistant Minister for Health	National	Euroa
Trung Luu	Shadow Assistant Minister for Police, Corrections and Crime Prevention	Liberal	MLC for Western Metropolitan Region
Chris Crewther	Shadow Assistant Minister for Housing and Rental Affordability	Liberal	Mornington
Renee Heath	Shadow Assistant Minister for Victims of Family Violence; Shadow Assistant Minister for Multicultural Affairs	Liberal	MLC for Eastern Victoria Region
Ann-Marie Hermans	Shadow Assistant Minister for Education	Liberal	MLC for South-Eastern Metropolitan Region
Richard Welch	Shadow Assistant Minister for Industry and Economic Growth	Liberal	MLC for North-Eastern Metropolitan Region
Nicole Werner	Shadow Assistant Minister for Youth and Future Leaders	Liberal	Warrandyte
Martin Cameron	Shadow Assistant Minister for Energy Affordability; Shadow Assistant Minister for Small Business	National	Morwell
Wayne Farnham	Shadow Assistant Minister to the Leader of the Opposition; Shadow Assistant Minister for Planning and the Building Industry	Liberal	Narracan
Bill Tilley	Shadow Assistant Minister for Boating and Fishing	Liberal	Benambra
Kim O'Keeffe	Shadow Assistant Minister for Regional Multicultural Affairs	National	Shepparton
