= President of the Victorian Legislative Council =

President of the Legislative Council
- Incumbent; Shaun Leane (Labor) since 20 December 2022
- Style: The Honourable
- Appointer: Elected by the Victorian Legislative Council
- Inaugural holder: Sir James Frederick Palmer
- Formation: 21 November 1856
- Deputy: Wendy Lovell
- Website: Parliament of Victoria: Former members

The President of the Victorian Legislative Council, also known as the presiding officer of the council, is the presiding officer of the Victorian Legislative Council, the upper house of the Parliament of Victoria and equivalent to the President of the Australian Senate. When there is a vacancy in the office of president, a new president is elected by the members of the council from among its number. The president ceases to hold that office if they cease to be a member of the council, and can be removed at any time by a vote of the members. The current president is Shaun Leane.

== The role of the president ==
The president is always a member of the Victorian Legislative Council, and is the ceremonial head of that council. The president performs ceremonial duties, and represents the council to other organisations. In conjunction with the Speaker of the Victorian Legislative Assembly, the president is responsible for the administration of the Victorian Parliament. When the council is sitting, the president enforces procedures and assists the smooth running of council meetings. The president is assisted in their duties by a deputy president.

== Choosing the president ==
The president of the Legislative Council is an elected position. When a new president is required, any member of the Legislative Council may propose, during a council sitting, any other present member for the position of president. If more than one member is proposed and seconded, all members must agree to one particular candidate. After election, the president presents his or herself as the choice of the council to be their president.

== List of presidents of the Legislative Council ==
Note: where no political party is listed, this means that either the party is unknown, or that the President in question was not affiliated with any particular party. Multiple parties are listed in cases where the President represented more than one party over his career as a Member of the Legislative Council.

Ordinal	President	Party (if applicable)	Term start	Term end	Time in office	Notes
1	Sir James Frederick Palmer	no party alignment	21 November 1856	1 August 1870	13 years, 253 days	
2	Sir William Mitchell	no party alignment	27 October 1870	24 November 1884	14 years, 28 days	
3	Sir James MacBain	no party alignment	27 November 1884	8 November 1892	7 years, 347 days	
4	Sir William Zeal	no party alignment	10 November 1892	31 May 1901	8 years, 202 days	
5	Sir Henry John Wrixon	no party alignment	18 June 1901	28 June 1910	9 years, 10 days	
6	Sir John Mark Davies	no party alignment	6 July 1910	30 June 1919	8 years, 359 days	
7	Sir Walter Manifold	Nationalist	8 July 1919	28 August 1923	4 years, 51 days	
8	Sir Frank Clarke	Nationalist; United Australia Party; Liberal	29 August 1923	30 June 1943	19 years, 305 days	
9	Sir Clifden Eager	Nationalist Party of Australia; Liberal; Liberal & Country	29 June 1943	30 June 1958	15 years, 1 day	
10	Sir Gordon McArthur	Liberal & Country; Liberal	8 July 1958	10 August 1965	7 years, 33 days	
11	Sir Ronald Mack	Liberal	14 September 1965	12 February 1968	2 years, 151 days	
12	Sir Raymond Garrett	Liberal	20 February 1968	30 June 1976	8 years, 131 days	
13	William Fry	Liberal	29 June 1976	1 July 1979	3 years, 2 days	
14	Fred Grimwade	Liberal	18 July 1979	15 July 1985	5 years, 362 days	
15	Rod Mackenzie	Labor	16 July 1985	24 October 1988	3 years, 100 days	
16	Alan Hunt	Liberal	25 October 1988	26 October 1992	4 years, 1 day	
17	Bruce Chamberlain	Liberal	27 October 1992	24 February 2003	10 years, 120 days	
18	Monica Gould	Labor	25 February 2003	18 December 2006	3 years, 296 days	
19	Bob Smith	Labor	19 December 2006	20 December 2010	4 years, 1 day	
20	Bruce Atkinson	Liberal	21 December 2010	19 December 2018	7 years, 363 days	
21	Shaun Leane	Labor	19 December 2018	18 June 2020	1 year, 182 days	
22	Nazih Elasmar	Labor	18 June 2020	20 December 2022	2 years, 185 days	
(21)	Shaun Leane	Labor	20 December 2022	Incumbent	3 years, 261 days	
