= Matthew Bach =

Australian politician

Matt Bach MLC
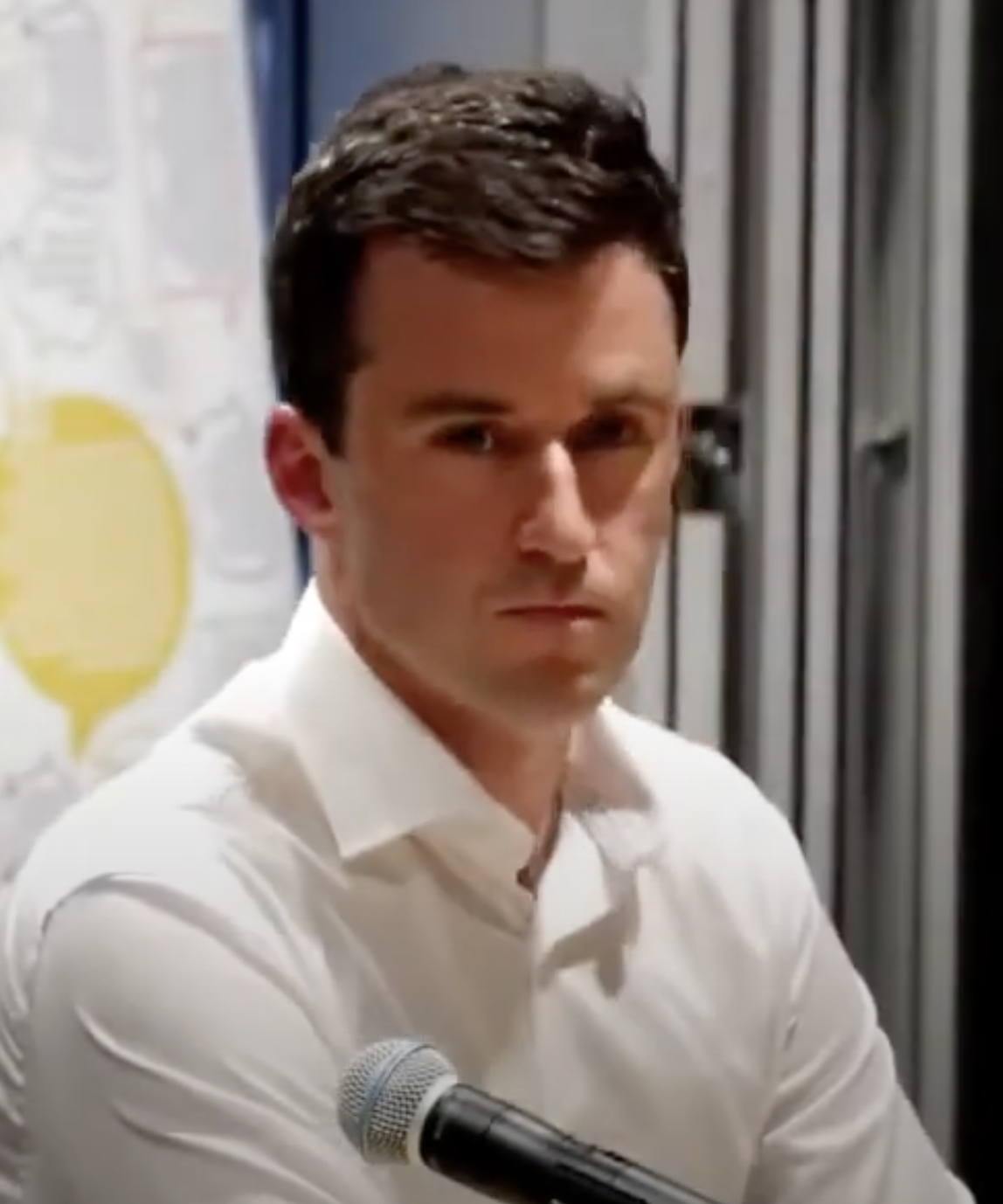

Deputy Leader of the Liberal Party in the Victorian Legislative Council
- In office 8 December 2022 – 31 August 2023
- Leader: Georgie Crozier
- Preceded by: Georgie Crozier
- Succeeded by: Evan Mulholland

Member of the Victorian Legislative Council for North-Eastern Metropolitan
- In office 5 March 2020 – 7 December 2023
- Preceded by: Mary Wooldridge
- Succeeded by: Richard Welch

Personal details
- Born: 31 March 1983 (age 43) Melbourne, Australia
- Party: Liberal Party
- Occupation: Politician, Teacher, Historian
- Website: https://www.matthewbach.com.au/

Matthew Donald Andrew Bach (born 31 March 1983) is an Australian teacher, historian, and former politician. He served as a Liberal Member of the Victorian Parliament from 2020 to 2023, representing the North-Eastern Metropolitan Region in the Legislative Council. Bach also served as Deputy Leader of the Opposition in the Legislative Council, and as a frontbencher in the Shadow Cabinets of Michael O'Brien, Matthew Guy, and John Pesutto.

In 2023, Bach retired from politics to resume his teaching career in the United Kingdom, where he will be teaching at Brighton College.

== Personal life ==
Bach was born in Melbourne in 1983 and spent the beginning of his life in the foster care system before his adoption. He attended Melbourne Grammar School, graduating in 2001.

Bach attended the University of Melbourne and graduated with a Bachelor of Arts. He also holds a Graduate Diploma of Teaching and Learning from Charles Darwin University. In 2018, he was awarded a PhD in History from the University of Melbourne. Bach's research explored the existence of a criminal class in Victorian London and the effectiveness of measures to counter it. In 2020, Bach published a book based on his doctoral thesis.

After graduating, Bach worked as a schoolteacher in the United Kingdom and as a Ministerial Advisor to Mary Wooldridge when she was the Minister for Community Services, Mental Health, and Women's Affairs in the Baillieu Government. Bach then worked as a senior leader, staff board representative and teacher of History and Politics at Carey Baptist Grammar School. He was later the Deputy Principal and Head of the Senior School at Ivanhoe Girls' Grammar School, where he taught English and History.

Bach campaigned for the Conservative Party in the 2010 United Kingdom general election; in his candidacy for the Eastern Metropolitan Region, he cited his experience campaigning in the United Kingdom and his success in winning back seats from opposition while successfully campaigning in marginal seats as a strength in support of his candidacy.

== Political career ==
Bach won the Liberal Party's nomination to fill the vacancy caused by the resignation of Mary Wooldridge, and was sworn in as Member for Eastern Metropolitan Region in March 2020. He served in the Shadow Cabinet under Liberal leaders Michael O'Brien and Matthew Guy across the Child Protection, Youth Justice, Youth Affairs, Higher Education, Early Childhood, and Attorney-General's portfolios. In the lead up to the 2022 election, Bach also served as the Shadow Minister for Transport Infrastructure and was a vocal opponent of the Andrews Government's Suburban Rail Loop, citing inadequate planning and significant cost overruns.

Following a redistribution at the 2022 election, Bach was re-elected to Parliament as Member for North-Eastern Metropolitan Region. In December 2022, following the election of John Pesutto to the leadership of the Liberal Party, Bach was elected Deputy Leader of the Liberal Party in the Legislative Council and was appointed as the Shadow Minister for Education and Shadow Minister for Child Protection.

In August 2023, Bach resigned from his leadership positions and announced his intention to retire from politics and resume his career as a teacher in the United Kingdom. Bach resigned from his seat in Parliament in December 2023, and was succeeded by Richard Welch.

During his time in parliament, Bach was considered to be an ally of John Pesutto, as well as holding moderate political positions in relation to his Liberal colleagues.
