= Richard Welch (Australian politician) =

Australian politician

Richard Welch MLC
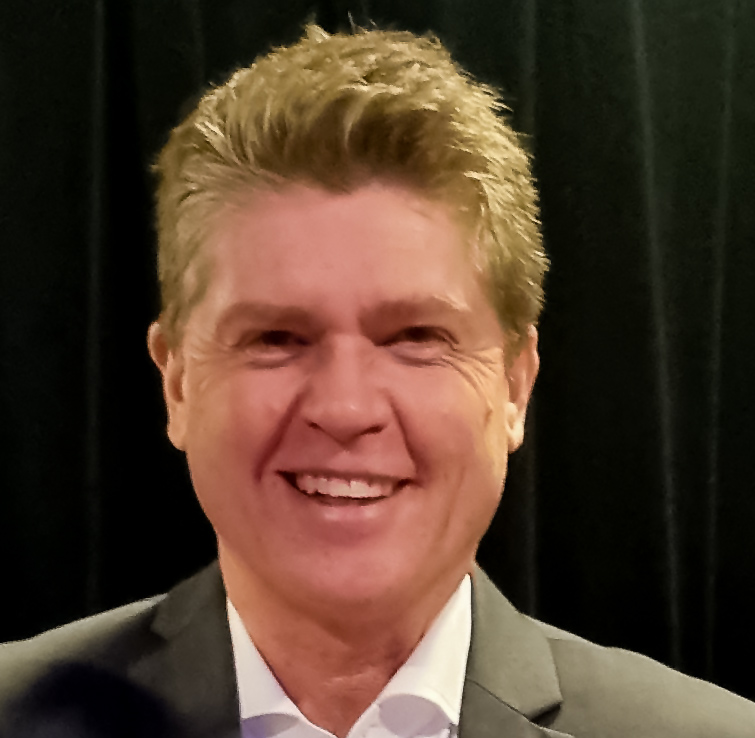

Member of the Victorian Legislative Council for North-Eastern Metropolitan Region
- Incumbent
- Assumed office 7 February 2024

Personal details
- Born: Victoria, Australia
- Party: Liberal
- Occupation: Businessman, inventor, politician
- Website: https://www.richardwelch.com.au/

Richard Welch is an Australian politician. He has been a member of the Victorian Legislative Council for the North-Eastern Metropolitan Region since 7 February 2024, representing the Liberal Party. He currently serves as Shadow Minister for Industry, Shadow Minister for Manufacturing and Innovation, and Shadow Minister for AI and the Digital Economy.

== Early life and career ==
Welch was born in country Victoria. He worked in financial services for Bankers Trust and Merrill Lynch in London. He completed a Master of Business Administration at Imperial College London. While studying, he invented and patented motion-tracking technology for cricket coaching and analysis. He founded a sports technology company and a manufacturing facility in India.

== Political career ==
Welch first stood for parliament as the Liberal candidate for the state seat of Yan Yean at the 2022 Victorian state election. He later contested the federal seats of McEwen at the 2022 Australian federal election and Jagajaga at the 2019 Australian federal election.

In December 2023 he won Liberal preselection for the North-Eastern Metropolitan Region to replace the retiring Matthew Bach. He was elected on 7 February 2024 and delivered his inaugural speech in the Legislative Council on 20 February 2024.

In 2025, Welch was appointed to the Liberal shadow ministry as Shadow Minister for Industry, Shadow Minister for Manufacturing and Innovation, and Shadow Minister for AI and the Digital Economy.

Welch’s short time in politics has been marred by a number of scandals. In March 2025, Welch was referred to the Legislative Council Privileges Committee after records indicated he was still listed as a secretary for a UK-based business. Under parliamentary rules, MPs are required to fully disclose all external business interests and corporate ties.

In December 2025, Welch admitted to offering “same-day” printing services from his taxpayer-funded office to his party's MPs, candidates and branch members, and was subsequently referred to the parliament's integrity watchdog and the Independent Broad-based Anti-corruption Commission.

Welch was in the media again in December 2025 when the Herald Sun revealed a series of allegations of misconduct were made against a young Liberal who worked in his Parliamentary office.

The Herald Sun’s article reported the Liberal Party’s Complaints and Disputes Resolution Committee was probing the allegations, at least one of which related to messages sent on social media to an underage female.
