= Nick McGowan =

Australian politician

Nick McGowan MLC

Member of the Victorian Legislative Council for North-Eastern Metropolitan
- Incumbent
- Assumed office 26 November 2022

Personal details
- Education: Galvin Park Secondary College (Now Wyndham Central College), Eltham High School
- Profession: Politician

Nicholas McGowan is an Australian politician. He is a member of the Victorian Legislative Council representing the North-Eastern Metropolitan Region since November 2022. McGowan is a member of the Liberal Party. He has served as the Shadow Minister for Community Services and Shadow Minister for Victim Support since 11 October 2025.

== Early life and education ==
McGowan was born in Ivanhoe, Victoria, and raised by his single mother alongside his brother. His early life was marked by financial challenges and frequent relocations, as his mother worked various jobs including warehouse work, community based childcare, and clerical duties to support the family. They lived in several locations, including Ballarat, Eltham, and Werribee, where McGowan attended Galvin Park Secondary College (now Wyndham Central College). At the age of 12, he began contributing to the household income by taking on small jobs in his neighborhood.

McGowan completed his secondary education at Eltham High School. During his time as a university student, he worked for several members of parliament and became one of Victoria’s youngest local government candidates when he ran for election in the Shire of Eltham at the age of 18.

== Career ==
McGowan worked for various MPs during his time at university, before being a young adviser in Premier Jeff Kennett's office.

In 1999, McGowan volunteered with Australian Volunteers International in Thailand, working across Southeast Asia. In 2001, he joined the United Nations, undertaking humanitarian, public affairs, and policy work in the Republic of Congo, Burundi, Liberia, and Afghanistan. His final field assignment with the UN was as a civilian peacekeeper working directly for the Secretary General’s Special Representative in Burundi.

When Matthew Guy was the Victorian Planning Minister in 2010, McGowan was his chief of staff.

McGowan was the Liberal candidate for the Division of Jagajaga at the 2013 federal election, standing against Labor's Jenny Macklin, who had held the seat since 1996. He won 41.94% of the primary vote, ahead of Macklin's 38.00%, but Macklin kept the seat on preferences with 53.13% of the two-candidate-preferred vote. McGowan's 46.87% was a swing of 8.02% to the Liberal Party.

Upon returning to Australia in 2016, McGowan was appointed by the Minister for Immigration to the Migration Review Tribunal and Refugee Review Tribunal. He applied his knowledge and understanding of migration, humanitarian affairs, protection, human rights, and international law in these roles, serving for eight years before standing for election.

At the 2018 Victorian state election, he stood for the Legislative Assembly seat of Eltham against Labor's sitting member, Vicki Ward. He won 38.81% of the primary vote and 40.93% of the two-party-preferred vote, a swing of 6.38% against the Liberals, and Ward was re-elected.

From August 2022, McGowan was again the chief of staff of Matthew Guy, when Guy was the Opposition Leader, in the lead-up to the 2022 election.

McGowan was elected to the Victorian Legislative Council at the 2022 state election, representing the North-Eastern Metropolitan Region.

Following a reshuffle of the Battin shadow ministry on 11 October 2025, McGowan became the Shadow Minister for Community Services and Shadow Minister for Victim Support.

In December 2025 he became Shadow Minister for the Environment and for Fire Rescue Victoria.

McGowan is the Liberal candidate for the Legislative Assembly seat of Ringwood at the 2026 Victorian state election.

== Political positions ==
=== Australian republic ===
McGowan supports Australia becoming a republic, arguing that the monarchy represents the nation’s past rather than its future and that Australia’s head of state should be an Australian. He has framed republicanism as a logical next step in Australia’s gradual move toward full independence, stating that the current constitutional arrangement prevents Australians from holding the highest office in the country.

== Personal life ==
McGowan is married and has three children. Following the 2013 federal election, he was reported to be living in Eltham. He is a childhood friend of former Liberal leader Matthew Guy and was the best man at Guy's wedding. When Guy appointed McGowan as his chief of staff in 2022, one Liberal MP described the move as "a job for a mate".

In his July 2024 return to the Parliament of Victoria's Register of Interests, McGowan declared a single residential property, located in Templestowe Lower, a suburb within the Legislative Assembly district of Bulleen. The same return disclosed a second property in Heidelberg Heights, declared as sold as at 13 July 2024. His most recent return, signed in July 2026, gives the location of his residential property interests, including one held through a trust, only as "Melbourne", although the form asks for the suburb or town. Neither return named a suburb within the electoral district of Ringwood.
