= Aiv Puglielli =

Australian politician

Aiv Puglielli MLC
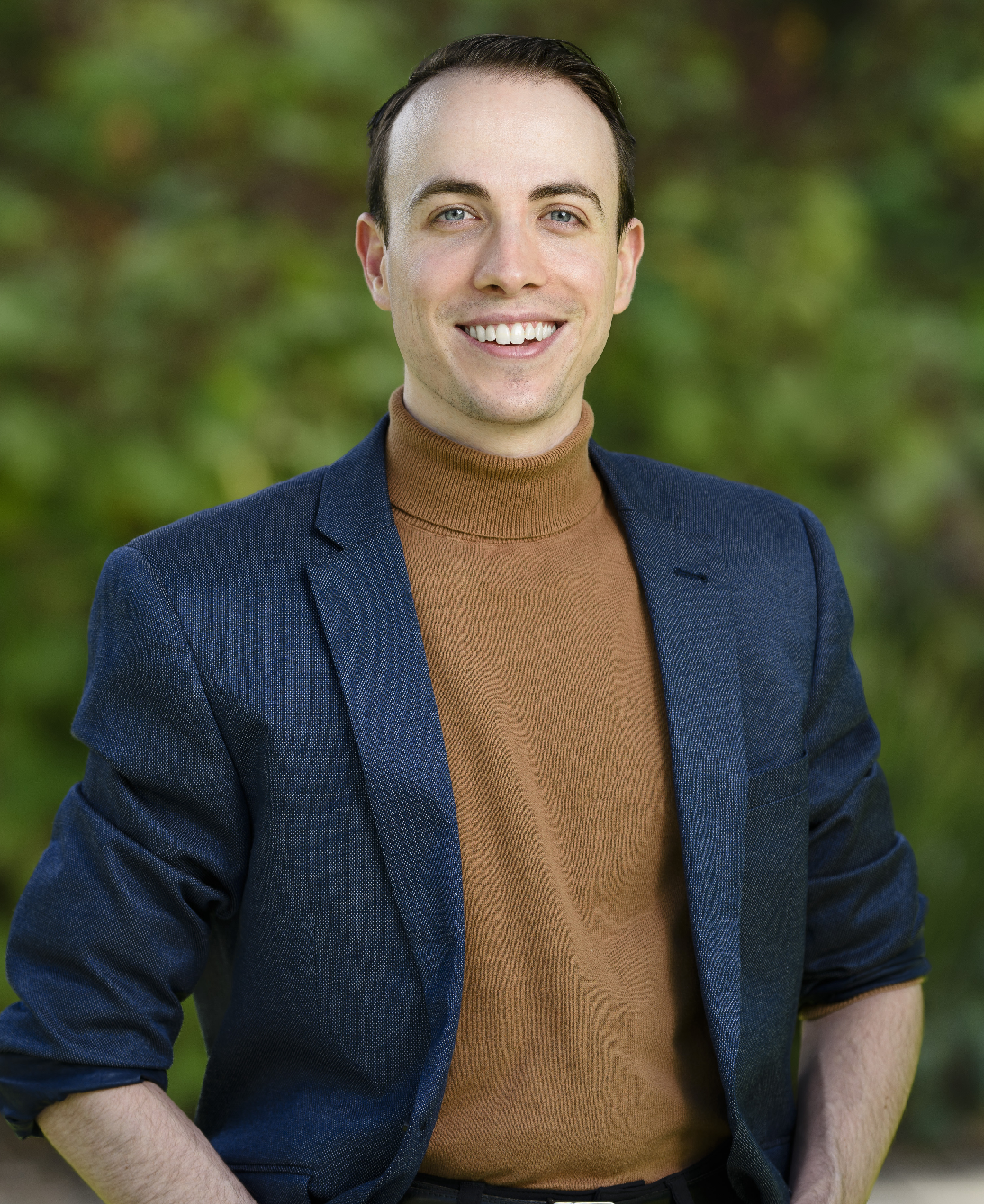
- Puglielli in 2022

Member of the Victorian Legislative Council for North-Eastern Metropolitan Region
- Incumbent
- Assumed office 26 November 2022
- Preceded by: Rod Barton

Personal details
- Born: 1995/1996
- Party: Greens
- Profession: Politician

Aiv Puglielli (/eɪv pʊlˈjɛli/ AYV puul-YEL-ee) (born 1995/1996) is an Australian politician and musician who is a member of the Victorian Legislative Council for the Victorian Greens, representing the North Eastern Metropolitan Region. He was elected in the 2022 Victorian state election on the 24th count. Upon election, he became the youngest member of the Victorian Parliament.

== Career ==
=== Early life ===
Prior to entering Parliament, Puglielli was an artist, composer, and producer working primarily in theatre. With a background in classical trumpet and composition, he trained at the National Institute of Dramatic Art, receiving a Diploma of Music Theatre. He then completed a bachelor's degree at the Western Australian Academy of Performing Arts. While working in the arts Puglielli actively collaborated with numerous artists who were members of the LGBTQ community, which he cited to the Star Observer as strengthening his progressive political beliefs.

=== Political career ===
Puglielli was elected to the Victorian Legislative Council at the 2022 election, representing North-Eastern Metropolitan for the Victorian Greens. Upon his election he declared to the Star Observer a desire to improve the living conditions of transgender and non-binary individuals in Victoria, through expanding Victoria's laws against hate speech.

In 2026 Puglielli successfully passed a motion establishing an inquiry into manosphere figures promoting gay bashing attacks in Victoria, after police investigations into several such assaults established social media influencers as a driving cause behind them.

== Personal life ==
Puglielli identifies as queer.
