= Sonja Terpstra =

Australian politician

Sonja Terpstra MLC

Member of the Victorian Legislative Council for North-Eastern Metropolitan Region
- Incumbent
- Assumed office 24 November 2018
- Constituency: North-Eastern Metropolitan Region (2022–present); Eastern Metropolitan Region (2018–2022)

Personal details
- Party: Australian Labor Party
- Website: sonjaterpstramp.com.au

Sonja Terpstra in an Australian politician who has been a Labor Party member of the Victorian Legislative Council since 2018, representing North-Eastern Metropolitan Region.

Terpstra is a member of the Labor Left faction of the Labor Party. Sonja was not born in Victoria, but in New South Wales. Her father was a truck driver, and her mother was a sewer and unionist. Sonja did not finish her high school education and left school years earlier, in year 10. Sonja attended the local TAFE where she learnt to use a typewriter, allowing her to later find employment in clerical and secretarial roles within various Unions. Sonja later became the first woman to hold the metropolitan manager role in the AMWU. Before becoming a politician, Sonja worked for the Australian Nursing and Midwifery Federation Victoria branch. Sonja worked within the Union Movement for 20 years before entering parliament. On 12th October 2026, the then Premier of Victoria, Ben Carroll, announced that Sonja will not be seeking re-election in the 2026 state election.
