= Jennifer Huppert =

Australian politician

Jennifer Sue Huppert (born 13 October 1962) is an Australian lawyer and former politician. Born in Melbourne, Victoria, she was a solicitor before entering politics. On 3 February 2009, she was appointed to the Victorian Legislative Council as a Labor member for Southern Metropolitan Region to replace Evan Thornley, who retired.

Huppert was second on the Labor ticket for the Southern Metropolitan Region in the 2010 election, but was defeated.
