= Jan Kronberg =

Australian politician

Member of the Victorian Legislative Council
- In office 25 November 2006 – 29 November 2014

Personal details
- Born: 16 September 1947 (age 78) Melbourne
- Party: Liberal Party
- Occupation: Academic
- Website: www.jankronberg.com

Janice Susan Kronberg (born 16 September 1947) is an Australian politician and a former member of the Victorian Legislative Council representing the Eastern Metropolitan Region.

Kronberg was born in Melbourne and is married with two children and two stepchildren. She received a Graduate Diploma of Training and Development in 2004 from the University of Melbourne. She worked in a computer service bureau and in executive search and selection. She was a lecturer in marketing at the Box Hill Institute from 1996 to 2006.

Kronberg was elected to Parliament at the November 2006 election, becoming the only Liberal Party candidate to win the third position on any Upper House ticket. She was re-elected again in November 2010.

In a letter to the Diamond Valley Leader newspaper on 21 November 2012, Labor MP for Electoral district of Yan Yean Danielle Green accused Kronberg of ‘being caught out’ claiming credit for $625,000 worth of funding for kinders and child care centres in the Melbourne municipality of Nillumbik (part of Kronberg's electorate), when in fact the money was being provided by the Federal government.

On 22 November 2012, The Age newspaper reported criticism of a Victorian state parliamentary ‘Inquiry into Liveability Options in Outer Suburban Melbourne’, of which Kronberg was the inquiry chairperson, as it had just one reference to transport issues – in London. Labor parliamentarian and committee member Natalie Hutchins, the member for Electoral district of Keilor, said the government's neglect of transport issues was a disgraceful oversight. "I think it's a bit of a disgrace in that it doesn't mention public transport or trains or buses or roads, which is probably one of the most significant issues we've heard about with the growing outer suburbs," Ms Hutchins said.

In March 2014, amongst speculation that she was being pressured to retire to make way for fellow Liberal MP Mary Wooldridge, who was without a seat to contest due to a redistribution that had abolished her former seat of Electoral district of Doncaster, Kornberg announced she would be retiring at the November 2014 state election.
