= Samantha Dunn =

Australian politician (born 1964)

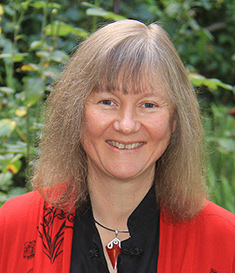

Member of the Victorian Legislative Council for Eastern Metropolitan Region
- In office 29 November 2014 – 24 November 2018

Personal details
- Born: 18 June 1964 (age 62)
- Party: Greens (2004−2019)
- Website: samanthadunn.com.au

Samantha Dunn (born 18 June 1964) is a former Australian politician. She was a Greens member of the Victorian Legislative Council, representing Eastern Metropolitan Region from 2014 to 2018. She lost her seat in the 2018 state election, and subsequently resigned from the party.

She was previously a Yarra Ranges Shire councillor, representing Lyster Ward from 2005 until her election to the Upper House in 2014, being reelected in 2008 and 2012. In 2012 she achieved a 53% primary vote, a record for any Greens candidate in Australia. During her time as a local Councillor she was President of the VLGA and the Eastern Transport Coalition.
