= Mary Wooldridge =

Australian politician

The Honourable Mary Wooldridge
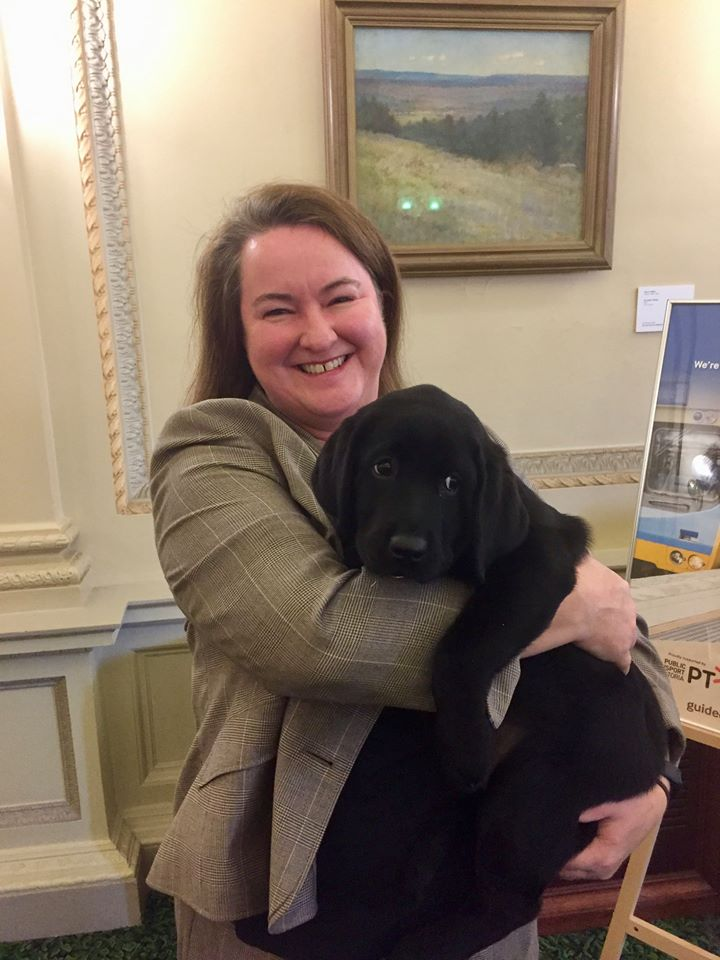
- Mary Wooldridge at Guide Dog's Victoria Breakfast

Member of the Victorian Legislative Council for Eastern Metropolitan
- In office 29 November 2014 – 28 February 2020
- Succeeded by: Matthew Bach

Member of the Victorian Legislative Assembly for Doncaster
- In office 25 November 2006 – 28 November 2014
- Preceded by: Victor Perton
- Succeeded by: Seat abolished

Personal details
- Born: 29 July 1967 (age 59) Melbourne
- Party: Liberal Party
- Children: 1
- Website: marywooldridge.com

Mary Louise Newling Wooldridge (born 29 July 1967) is a former Australian politician. She was a Liberal Party member of the Parliament of Victoria from 2006 to 2019. She was a member of the Victorian Legislative Assembly, representing the seat of Doncaster from 2006 to 2014; her seat was abolished in a redistribution for that year's election, and she was subsequently elected to the Victorian Legislative Council for Eastern Metropolitan Region in November's state election.

Wooldridge was the state Minister for Mental Health, Minister for Women's Affairs and Minister for Community Services from 2010 to 2014, serving under both Ted Baillieu and Denis Napthine. She was elected as leader of the Liberal Party in the Legislative Council in December 2014 and appointed as the Shadow Minister for Health.

== Childhood and education ==
Wooldridge was born and raised in Melbourne and is the youngest of four children. She graduated from Melbourne University with a Bachelor of Commerce degree with Honours in 1989. In 1994 she completed a Master of Business Administration (MBA) from the Harvard Business School. She is the sister of Michael Wooldridge, a former federal Deputy Leader of the Liberal Party.

== Professional career ==
Wooldridge has worked in executive roles with a number of companies including consultants McKinsey & Company in New York and London, Australian Consolidated Press and Publishing and Broadcasting Limited in Sydney.

Between 2001 and 2005 Wooldridge was the chief executive of The Foundation For Young Australians, a not-for-profit charitable trust. In 2002 she was awarded the new chief executive officer award in Equity Trustees National Nonprofit CEO awards for this role.

== Political career ==
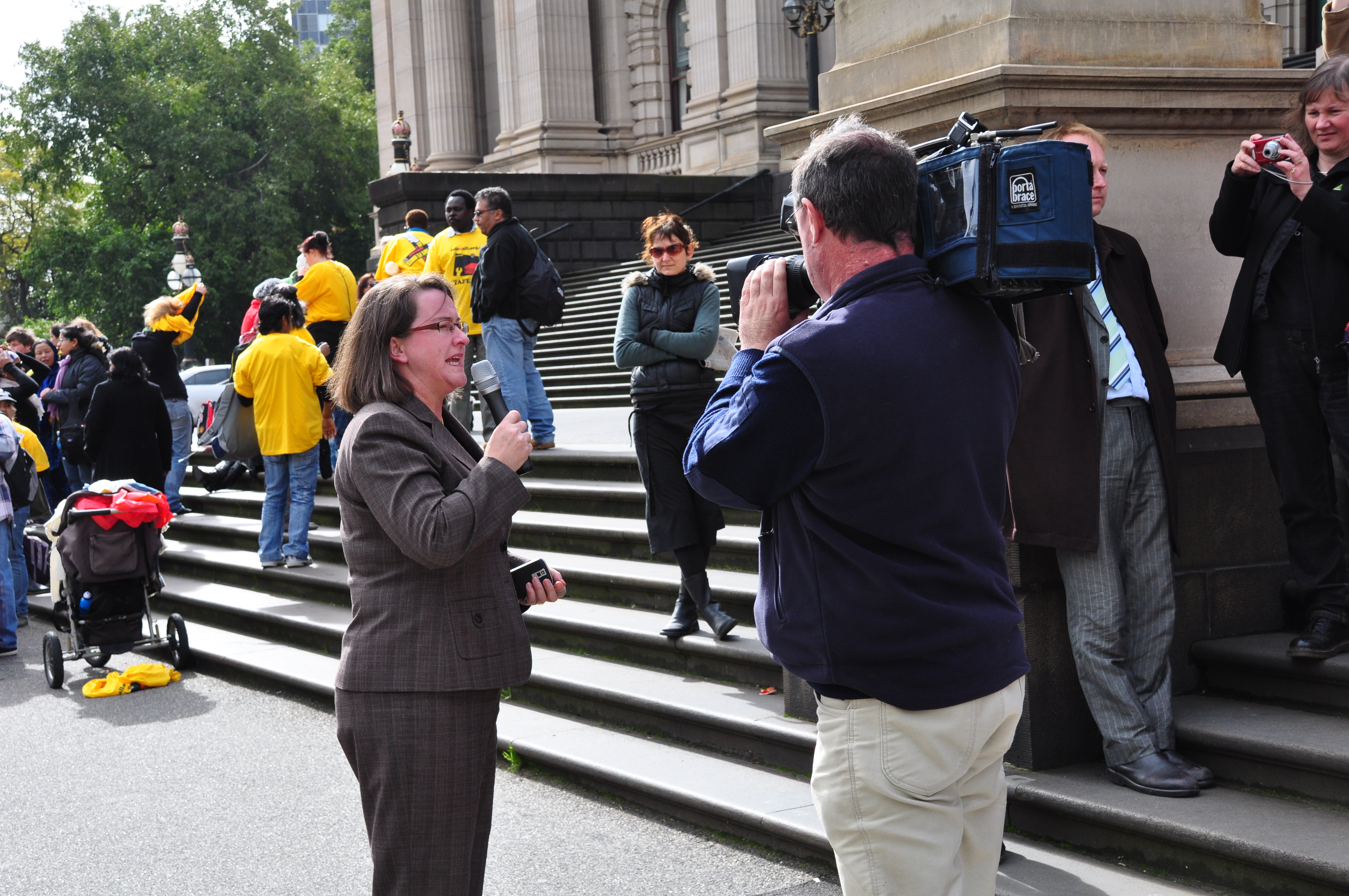
Mary Wooldridge addressing a protest about logging of Brown Mountain forest.

Wooldridge joined the Liberal Party in 1987.

From 1999 to 2001 Wooldridge worked as a Senior Adviser to Senator the Hon Nick Minchin. As part of her duties with the Senator, Wooldridge took part in an overseas trip that was the cause of some consternation for the federal Labor Opposition.

She chaired the Commonwealth Advisory Committee on Homelessness, which advises the federal Minister for Family and Community Services on matters relating to homelessness.

=== Member for Doncaster (2006–2010) ===
In May 2006 she was preselected as the Liberal candidate for the seat of Doncaster to replace retiring member Victor Perton, and was elected to the Parliament of Victoria in November 2006.

The Liberal party was defeated at the election and remained in Opposition. Despite being a new Member, Wooldridge was appointed to five Shadow Ministries. She was Shadow Minister for Mental Health, Drug Abuse, Community Services and Environment and Climate Change. One of the issues which came up in her first term was the lack of rail transport in the City of Manningham. In April 2010, she said the Opposition "strongly supported" the council's plans to extend the number 48 tram to the rapidly developing Doncaster Hill precinct.

=== Minister in Baillieu/Napthine Governments (2010–2014) ===
When the Coalition won the 2010 state election, Wooldridge was appointed to the Baillieu Ministry as Minister for Mental Health, Women's Affairs and Community Services (her brother Michael, incidentally, had been Federal Health Minister in 1996–2001). When Denis Napthine replaced Baillieu as Premier, Wooldridge also became Minister for Disability Services and Reform, ceding the Women's Affairs portfolio to Heidi Victoria.

In the Community Services Portfolio, Wooldridge established the Commissioner for Children and Young People and Australia's first Commissioner for Aboriginal Children and Young People. She instigated the Shergold Report into Reform of the Human Services Sector to improve partnerships between the government and community sector organisations, with a view to better address the needs of vulnerable community members.

In youth justice, Wooldridge and Martin Dixon, then Minister for Education, introduced full-time schooling for each young person within youth justice. The program established Parkville College which was located at the Youth Justice Precincts at Parkville and Malmsbury.

Mental health reforms led by Wooldridge included the significant re-drafting of the Victorian Mental Health Act. This was the first time Victoria's mental health legislation had been re-drafted in 25 years. The reforms placed patients and their family at the centre of decisions about their treatment, care and recovery. At the conclusion of the process, the Director of the Victorian Mental Illness Awareness Council stated "[Wooldridge is] the first Mental Health Minister I've ever worked with who is completely committed to listening to consumers". Part of those reforms included establishing Australia's first Mental Health Complaints Commissioner and the Mental Health Tribunal to hear and determine patients' treatment under the Act, including applications for the use of electroconvulsive treatment (ECT).

Wooldridge established a pilot Family Drug Treatment Court within the Family Division of the Children's Court of Victoria. The Court was designed to assist families whose children have been placed in out of home care due to parental substance misuse.

Wooldridge also legislated secondary supply laws which prohibited serving alcohol in a private residence to minors, without their parents’ permission. She also led a number of other public health campaigns, funding the hard-hitting What are you doing on ICE?, alcohol campaigns Name that point and No excuse needed, as well as the cannabis education campaign Don't let your dreams go up in smoke.

Wooldridge was the responsible Minister during the Protecting Victoria’s Vulnerable Children Inquiry in 2011. She tabled the Report of the Inquiry on 27 January 2012. The Inquiry Panel made 90 recommendations for measures to reduce the incidence and negative impact of child abuse and neglect in Victoria in ten major system reform areas.

Wooldridge secured the full roll-out of the National Disability Insurance Scheme (NDIS) across Victoria and negotiated for the National Disability Insurance Agency (NDIA) headquarters to be based in Geelong. Commencing with an Initial trial site in Barwon, the NDIS rollout required significant investment and reform to the disability portfolio. The scheme was designed to support people with a disability, using a model where they had genuine choice and control over their care.

In 2013, a redistribution of electoral boundaries saw Wooldridge's seat of Doncaster abolished. She stood for preselection for the seat of Kew, but despite the support of the Premier, lost preselection to Tim Smith. She contested a seat in the Upper House for the Eastern Metropolitan Region.

=== Opposition (2014–2020) ===
Following the November 2014 election, Wooldridge was elected to the Legislative Council as a representative for the Eastern Metropolitan Region and was subsequently elected by her colleagues as Leader of the Opposition in the Legislative Council and appointed Shadow Minister for Health.

In opposition, Wooldridge has been a vocal critic of the Andrews Governments decision to cancel the creation of Peter Mac Private, a 42-bed private hospital at the Victorian Comprehensive Cancer Centre. The decision to not proceed with Peter Mac Private cost the hospital at least $20 million in philanthropic donations which were contingent on the construction of the hospital. "By ripping $20 million out of Peter Mac, Daniel Andrews is cruelly affecting the treatment and survival of thousands of Victorians with cancer," Wooldridge has said.

Following 2018 Victorian State Election, Wooldridge was appointed Shadow Minister for Innovation, Jobs and Trade, Shadow Minister for Higher Education and Shadow Minister for Training and Skills. Wooldridge announced her intention to retire from state politics on 8 December 2019, using the moment to call on the Liberal Party to consider gender quotas as a way of increasing female representation in the Victorian Parliament. Wooldridge vacated her seat on 28 February 2020, and was replaced by Matthew Bach.

== Personal life ==
Wooldridge is married to Andrew, a surgeon, and they have a son. Wooldridge has been a Director of the Breast Cancer Network Australia, Foundation Boroondara, Trinity College at Melbourne University and the Otis Foundation, a network of rural retreats for women with breast cancer.

Victorian Legislative Assembly
Preceded by Victor Perton	Member for Doncaster; 2006–2014	Abolished
Political offices
Preceded by Maxine Morand	Minister for Women's Affairs; 2010–2013	Succeeded by Heidi Victoria
Preceded by Lisa Neville	Minister for Community Services; 2010–2014	Ministry abolished
Preceded by Lisa Neville	Minister for Mental Health; 2010–2014	Succeeded by Martin Foley
Ministry created	Minister for Disability Services and Reform; 2013–2014	Succeeded by Martin Foley as Minister for Housing, Disability and Ageing
