= Brian Tee (politician) =

Australian politician

Member of the Victorian Legislative Council
- In office 25 November 2006 – 29 November 2014

Personal details
- Born: 19 January 1969 (age 57) South Africa
- Party: Labor Party

Brian Lennox Tee (born 19 January 1969) is an Australian politician. He was a Labor Party member of the Victorian Legislative Council from 2006 to 2014, representing the Eastern Metropolitan Region.

Tee was born in South Africa and educated in Western Australia, and attended All Saints' College and the University of Western Australia, where he studied law. He subsequently gained admission as a solicitor, and practised with a commercial firm in Perth from 1992 to 1995. He was employed as an industrial officer by the Liquor, Hospitality and Miscellaneous Union from 1995 to 1999, and after a year in private practice, was employed by the Victorian Department of Innovation, Industry and Regional Development. In 2003, he shifted to the office of Attorney-General, Minister for Industrial Relations and Minister for Planning Rob Hulls, where he worked as a senior adviser until his own election to parliament.

Tee contested and won preselection in the second position on the ALP ticket in the Eastern Metropolitan Region for the Legislative Council in the leadup to the 2006 state election, beating out incumbent MLC Helen Buckingham, who subsequently announced her intention to retire. Tee was duly elected on election day. Although his former employer, Hulls, is from the right-wing Labor Unity faction, Tee is associated with the party's rival Socialist Left faction.

Following the defeat of the Brumby Government at the 2010 election, Tee was elected as Shadow Minister for Planning and Shadow Minister for Sustainable Growth in the Andrews Opposition.

Tee lost his seat to the Greens at the 2014 Victorian state election.
