= Richard Dalla-Riva =

Australian politician (born 1963)

The Honourable Richard Dalla-Riva
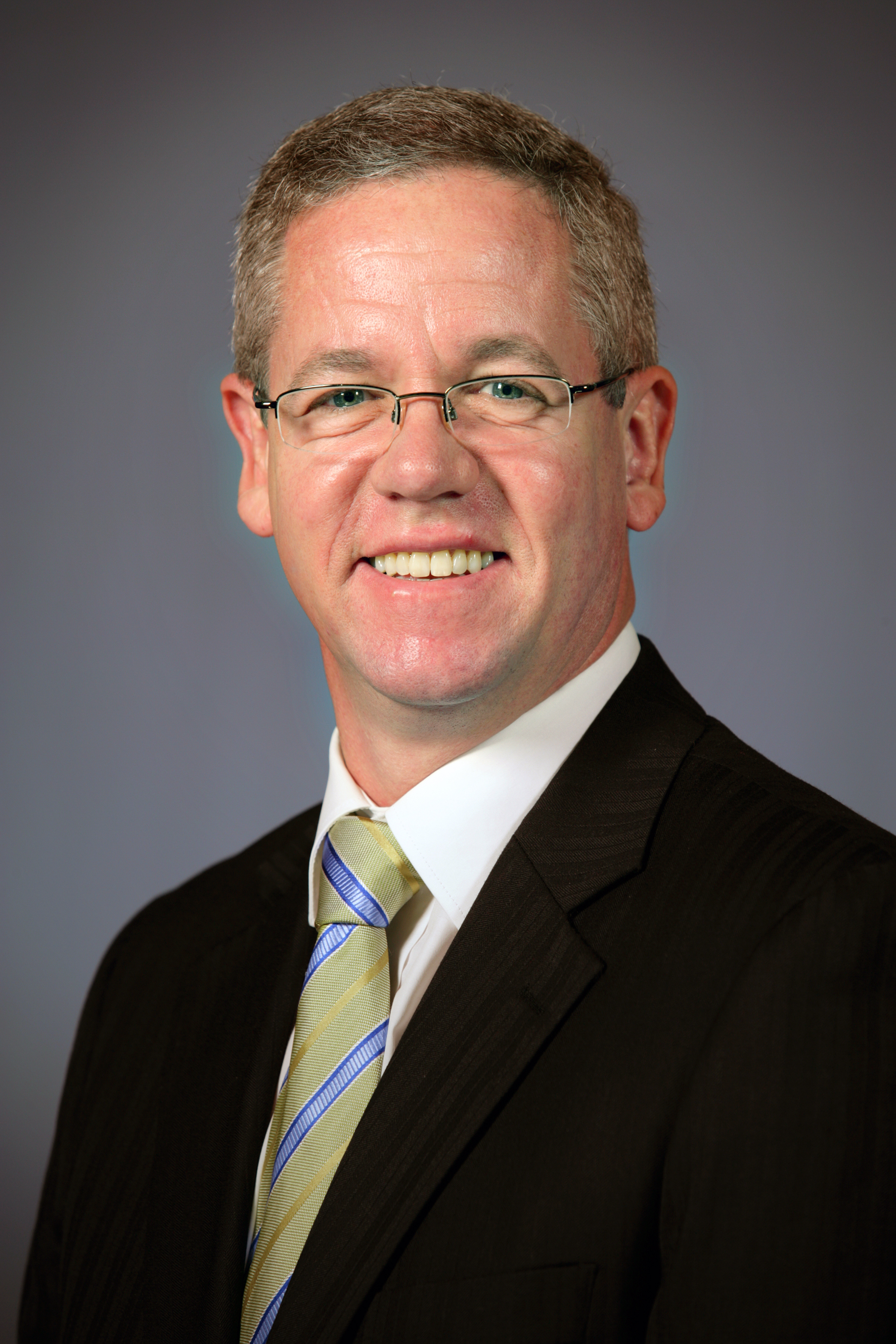

Member of the Victorian Legislative Council
- In office 30 November 2002 – 24 November 2018
- Succeeded by: Rod Barton

Personal details
- Born: 6 April 1963 (age 63) Orbost, Victoria
- Party: Liberal Party
- Occupation: Police officer and manager
- Website: www.richarddalla-riva.com

Richard Alex Gordon Dalla-Riva (born 6 April 1963) is an Australian former politician. He was a Liberal Party member of the Victorian Legislative Council from 2002 to 2018, representing East Yarra Province (2002–2006) and Eastern Metropolitan Region (2006–2018).

He served as Minister for Employment and Industrial Relations and Minister for Manufacturing in the Baillieu Ministry from 2010 to 2013, but was dropped in a reshuffle when Denis Napthine replaced Baillieu as Premier.

== Early life ==
Dalla-Riva was born in the regional town of Orbost, but grew up in Beechworth, before moving to Melbourne. After graduating from the Macleod High School (now Macleod College), he joined the police force, and was promoted to the rank of detective in 1988. He worked in a number of areas associated with financial crime, including the major fraud and asset recovery squads, and also spent time working for the National Crime Authority.

While still working in the police force, he studied business at the Phillip Institute of Technology (now part of the Royal Melbourne Institute of Technology). In 1995, after seven years as a detective, Dalla-Riva left the police force, and entered the private sector. He held various managerial roles at Woolworths, before becoming the General Manager for a national food manufacturer. Later, Dalla-Riva became the Group Manager for a large disability service before becoming the State Regional Manager for a US multi-national company. He received an MBA from the University of Southern Queensland in 1998.

Dalla-Riva has demonstrated a keen interest in community work and is currently involved in the following community organisations: the Essendon Football Club; Melbourne Cricket Club; Veneto Club Melbourne; Australia Day Council Victoria Inc. Dalla-Riva is the former Vice President of Kindergarten Parents’ Victoria Inc.

== Career ==
In 2000, Dalla-Riva began to take an active political role, becoming chairman of the Liberal Party's electorate council for East Yarra Province. His active role was rewarded when he won Liberal pre-selection to contest the seat at the 2002 election. He was elected amidst a major swing against the Liberal Party, with the loss of many seats across the state. Dalla-Riva was appointed Shadow Minister for the corrections portfolio, covering the state's prison system. In January 2004, Dalla-Riva was given the additional portfolio of scrutiny of government, replacing David Davis, who had been recently promoted. This saw Dalla-Riva handed the responsibility of investigating government mismanagement and playing a major role in the opposition's attacks on the government.

Dalla-Riva was re-appointed in 2007 to the Shadow Cabinet as Shadow Minister for Community Development, Innovation and Freedom of Information. In February 2008, Dalla-Riva was promoted and allocated the positions of Shadow Minister for Industry and State Development, Shadow Minister for Major Projects and Freedom of Information.

Dalla-Riva held various roles in the Shadow Cabinet. Since being elected to Parliament in 2002 until the election win 2010, Dalla-Riva held seven shadow ministerial positions. These included: Shadow Minister for Manufacturing and Export December 2005 – February 2007. Shadow Minister for Scrutiny of Government, May 2006 – February 2007, Shadow Minister for Community Development and Shadow Minister for Innovation August 2007 – February 2008, Shadow Minister for Freedom of Information August 2007 – November 2009, Shadow Minister for Industry and State Development and Shadow Minister for Major Projects February 2008 – December 2010.

Dalla-Riva was also the Liberal Party's representative on the Victorian Health Promotion Foundation (VicHealth) for the period 24 September 2007 – 23 September 2010, a statutory authority with an independent chair and board of governance with vast experience in health, sport, the arts, research and communication, working in partnership with organisations, communities and individuals to promote good health.

During Dalla-Riva's time in Parliament, he has also provided his services to several parliamentary committees including: the Library Committee, the Law Reform Committee, the Scrutiny of Acts and Regulations Committee, the Public Accounts and Estimates Committee and the LC Standing Orders Committee

Since the Coalition's win in 2010, Mr Dalla-Riva has made several announcements. One public policy announcement made on 2 March 2011 was to assign the Victoria Competition and Efficiency Commission (VCEC) to inquire into how to improve efficiency and growth in Victoria's manufacturing sector. Another policy announcement on 20 January 2011 concerned the Baillieu Government's commitment to Victoria's manufacturing sector industry and its provision of support and development opportunities to reinstate Victoria as the preeminent manufacturing state.

As Minister, he has made a series of manufacturing related statements including: a Victorian manufacturing plant signing a contract to produce components for Nissan, the launch of a new TV series to promote Victoria's wine industry in China, a Victorian company securing a new major defence contract.

Dalla-Riva was Minister for Employment & Industrial Relations and Minister for Manufacturing, Exports and Trade from December 2010 until March 2013. In March 2013, he was elected as the Chair of the Scrutiny of Acts and Regulations Committee. www.parliament.vic.gov.au/sarc In April 2013, he was elected as the Chair of the Standing Committee on Environment and Planning – Legislation Committee.

On 10 February 2017, Dalla-Riva announced he would retire from politics at the next state election in 2018.
