= Shaun Leane =

Australian politician

The Honourable Shaun Leane MLC

President of the Victorian Legislative Council
- Incumbent
- Assumed office 20 December 2022
- Deputy: Wendy Lovell
- Preceded by: Nazih Elasmar
- In office 19 December 2018 – 18 June 2020
- Deputy: Wendy Lovell
- Preceded by: Bruce Atkinson
- Succeeded by: Nazih Elasmar

Minister for Commonwealth Games Legacy
- In office 27 June 2022 – 5 December 2022
- Preceded by: New position
- Succeeded by: Harriet Shing

Minister for Veterans
- In office 22 June 2020 – 5 December 2022
- Preceded by: Robin Scott
- Succeeded by: Natalie Suleyman

Minister for Local Government
- In office 22 June 2020 – 27 June 2022
- Preceded by: Adem Somyurek
- Succeeded by: Melissa Horne

Minister for Suburban Development
- In office 22 June 2020 – 27 June 2022
- Preceded by: Marlene Kairouz
- Succeeded by: Melissa Horne

Member of the Victorian Legislative Council for North-Eastern Metropolitan Region
- Incumbent
- Assumed office 25 November 2006
- Constituency: North-Eastern Metropolitan Region (2022–present); Eastern Metropolitan Region (2006–2022)

Personal details
- Born: 20 August 1963 (age 62) Oakleigh, Victoria
- Party: Labor Party
- Profession: Electrician, union representative
- Website: www.shaunleanemp.com.au

Shaun Leo Leane (born 20 August 1963 in Oakleigh, Victoria) is a Labor Party politician and a current member for the North-Eastern Metropolitan Region in the Victorian Legislative Council, having been first elected at the 2006 election.

Leane has served as a member of both the Drugs and Crime Prevention Committee and the Road Safety Committee since 2007. In December 2018, he was elected as the President of the Victorian Legislative Council. In June 2020, he was made Minister for Local Government, Minister for Suburban Development and Minister for Veterans. In June 2022, he was appointed as Minister for Commonwealth Games Legacy as well but relinquished his roles as local government and suburban development minister. In December 2022, after the 2022 state election, Leane was removed from the upcoming cabinet by the caucus. In compensation, Leane would be nominated as the President of the Legislative Council in the upcoming parliament. He was successfully appointed unopposed as president for the second time on 20 December 2022.

On 1 December 2025, Leane announced he would not run for re-election in the 2026 Victorian state election, ending his 20-year political career.

Political offices
Preceded by Marlene Kairouz	Minister for Suburban Development; 2020–2022	Succeeded by Melissa Horne
Preceded by Adem Somyurek	Minister for Local Government; 2020–2022	Succeeded by Melissa Horne
Preceded by Robin Scott	Minister for Veterans; 2020–2022	Succeeded by Natalie Suleyman
New title	Minister for Commonwealth Games Legacy; June 2022 – December 2022	Succeeded by Harriet Shing
Victorian Legislative Council
Preceded by Bruce Atkinson	President of the Victorian Legislative Council; 2018–2020	Succeeded by Nazih Elasmar
Preceded by Nazih Elasmar	President of the Victorian Legislative Council; 2022–present	Incumbent
