= David Davis (Australian politician) =

Australian politician

The Honourable David Davis MLC
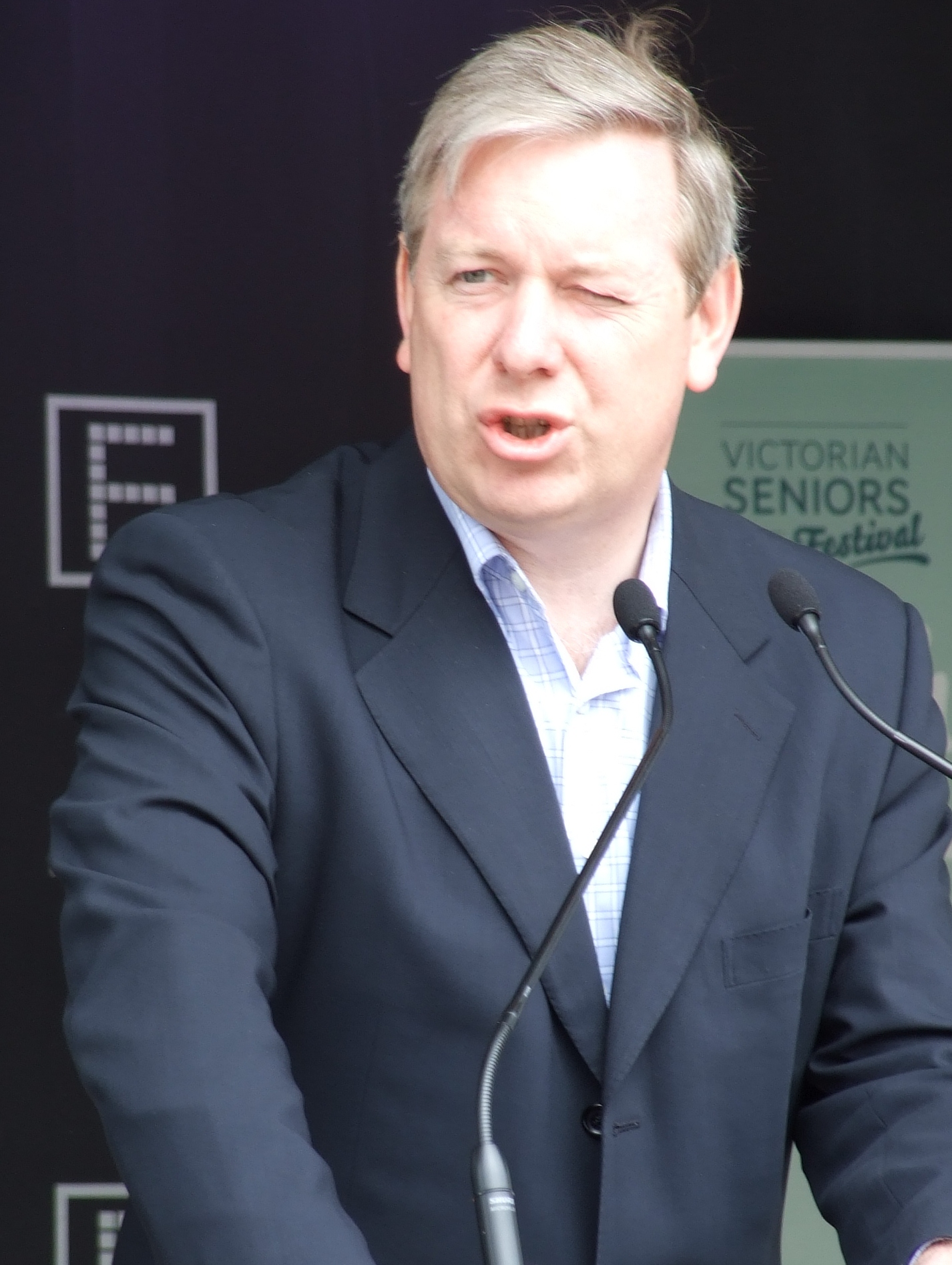
- Davis in 2012

Leader of the Opposition in the Victorian Legislative Council
- In office 27 December 2024 – 18 November 2025
- Deputy: Evan Mulholland
- Leader: Brad Battin
- Preceded by: Georgie Crozier
- Succeeded by: Bev McArthur
- In office 5 December 2018 – 8 December 2022
- Deputy: Georgie Crozier
- Leader: Michael O'Brien; Matthew Guy
- Preceded by: Mary Wooldridge
- Succeeded by: Georgie Crozier
- In office January 2008 – 27 November 2010
- Leader: Ted Baillieu

Leader of the Liberal Party in the Victorian Legislative Council
- In office 27 December 2024 – 18 November 2025
- Deputy: Evan Mulholland
- Leader: Brad Battin
- Preceded by: Georgie Crozier
- Succeeded by: Bev McArthur
- In office 5 December 2018 – 8 December 2022
- Deputy: Georgie Crozier
- Leader: Michael O'Brien; Matthew Guy
- Preceded by: Mary Wooldridge
- Succeeded by: Georgie Crozier
- In office January 2008 – 4 December 2014
- Leader: Ted Baillieu; Denis Napthine

Minister for Health
- In office 2 December 2010 – 4 December 2014
- Premier: Ted Baillieu; Denis Napthine
- Preceded by: Daniel Andrews
- Succeeded by: Jill Hennessy

Minister for Ageing
- In office 2 December 2010 – 4 December 2014
- Premier: Ted Baillieu; Denis Napthine
- Preceded by: Daniel Andrews
- Succeeded by: Jill Hennessy

Member of the Victorian Legislative Council for Southern Metropolitan Region
- Incumbent
- Assumed office 30 March 1996
- Constituency: Southern Metropolitan Region (2006–present); East Yarra Province (1996–2006)

Personal details
- Born: 8 April 1962 (age 64) Millicent, South Australia
- Party: Liberal
- Education: University of Melbourne
- Occupation: Chiropractor

David McLean Davis (born 8 April 1962) is an Australian politician. He has been a Liberal member of the Victorian Legislative Council since March 1996, representing East Yarra Province from 1996 until 2006 when it was abolished and the Southern Metropolitan Region from 2006 onwards. He was state Minister for Health from 2010 to 2014 under Premiers Ted Baillieu and Denis Napthine. Davis served as the Leader of the Liberal Party and Opposition in the Legislative Council from 2008-2010, 2018-2022, and again 2024 to 2025, and leader of the Government in the same chamber from 2010 to 2014.

== Early career ==
Davis was born in Millicent, South Australia and studied in Melbourne, Victoria. He was educated at Kingswood College (Box Hill). He studied applied science at the Phillip Institute of Technology (now part of the Royal Melbourne Institute of Technology). Davis also later studied philosophy at the University of Melbourne. He worked as a chiropractor and maintained a private practice until being elected to the Legislative Council in 1996.

== Political career ==
Davis had become involved with the Liberal Party during the early 1990s, serving as a delegate on several party committees, and acting as a delegate to the party's State Council between 1993 and 1995. This was to ultimately result in receiving preselection for the safe Liberal seat of East Yarra at the 1996 state election. After the Liberal Party's defeat at the 1999 state election, Davis became the Chair of the Opposition Waste Watch Committee. In this position, he was one of the Labor government's strongest critics, regularly making claims of perceived abuses. In 2000, he became the Parliamentary Secretary for Scrutiny of Government.

Davis almost lost his seat of East Yarra in the 2002 election, but became Shadow Minister for Health, replacing Ron Wilson, who had lost his seat in the 2002 election. In September 2004, Davis announced that if elected, a Liberal government would ban smoking in pubs and clubs. This was followed by a decision from the state government weeks later to the same effect. Davis was often an opponent of Robert Doyle's leadership of the parliamentary Liberal Party. In 2005 Doyle transferred Davis to the lower-profile environment portfolio. In May 2006, after Doyle's resignation and replacement by Ted Baillieu, Davis was once again promoted and given Baillieu's former portfolio of planning.

Following the 2006 election, Davis was again promoted by Baillieu to the position of Shadow Minister for State and Regional Development. In January 2008 he was elected Leader of the Opposition in the Legislative Council. Between February 2008 and November 2009, Davis was appointed as the Shadow Minister for Environment and Climate Change and in November 2009, he was appointed Shadow Minister for Health and Ageing, maintaining his responsibility for Scrutiny of Government.

Davis was appointed Shadow Treasurer in late 2021 following Matthew Guy's return to the Liberal leadership, a role which he held into 2022.

In February 2022, Davis, along with Matthew Guy, Peter Walsh, Gary Blackwood and Melina Bath, were fined $100 each for breaching face mask rules, after the Coalition MPs were photographed maskless while attending an event in Parliament House.

After incumbent member for Kew, Tim Smith confirmed that he would not seek re-election at the 2022 Victorian state election, Davis nominated for preselection for the seat. This move was believed by some to be an attempt to succeed Matthew Guy as leader of the Liberal Party should the Liberals fail to win the 2022 state election. Business Council of Australia director Jess Wilson was ultimately endorsed as the Liberal candidate for Kew, defeating Davis 99–64.

In March 2022, Davis was criticised for being intoxicated at a multicultural gala and allegedly 'making people feel uncomfortable by touching, hugging and getting too close to people.' Davis apologised in a written statement for his behaviour.

David was a member of the 'Kennett faction' of the Victorian Liberals. He voted for Matthew Guy in his successful 2021 leadership challenge against Michael O’Brien.

Political offices
Preceded by Daniel Andrews	Minister for Health; 2010–2014	Succeeded by Jill Hennessy
