= Bruce Atkinson =

Australian politician (born 1953)

The Honourable Bruce Atkinson AM
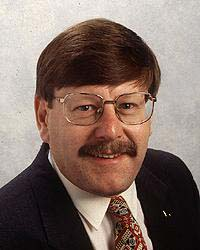

Member of the Victorian Legislative Council for Eastern Metropolitan Region
- In office 3 October 1992 – 26 November 2022
- Constituency: Eastern Metropolitan Region

President of the Victorian Legislative Council
- In office 21 December 2010 – 19 December 2018
- Preceded by: Bob Smith
- Succeeded by: Shaun Leane

Personal details
- Born: Bruce Norman Atkinson; 15 May 1953 (age 73) Melbourne, Victoria, Australia
- Party: Liberal Party
- Children: 3
- Website: bruceatkinson.com.au

Bruce Norman Atkinson (born 15 May 1953) is a former Australian politician. He was a Liberal member of the Victorian Legislative Council since October 1992, representing Koonung Province from 1992 to 2006 and Eastern Metropolitan Region from 2006 to 2022. He was the President of the Legislative Council from 2010 to 2018.

== Personal affairs ==
Atkinson was born in Melbourne, Victoria, Australia, and attended Mitcham High School. He undertook a cadetship with the Leader group of newspapers after graduating, and worked as a journalist for a period. However, he soon made a move into the business world, first into small business, and later into several more prominent operations, including a stint managing a shopping centre. He has also been a writer for the Foodweek and Inside Retailing publications since 1981, and operates his own business consultancy firm, The Atkinson Group.

== Political career ==
=== Local Politics ===
He was elected to the Nunawading city council in 1975, and served as a councillor there for 17 years. This included two terms as mayor in 1981–1982 and 1990–1991.

=== State Politics ===
In the lead-up to the 1992 state election, Atkinson won Liberal Party pre-selection for the moderately safe upper house seat of Koonung Province. He was elected, and served on the Family and Community Development Committee from 1992 to 1996. In 1996, he was promoted to ministry in the Kennett Government, as Parliamentary Secretary for Planning and Local Government.

Atkinson subsequently spent four years on the backbenches, during which time he did not serve on any committees. After a significant loss of the shadow ministry following the Liberal Party's defeat at the 2002 state election, Atkinson was appointed as the party's spokesperson for small business. He was also appointed to serve on the Housing and Economic Development Committees, and was deputy chair of the latter.

In January 2004 he was appointed spokesman for sport and recreation. In December 2006 he was elected Deputy President of the Legislative Council and relinquished his shadow ministry positions. In 2009 he was appointed Shadow Parliamentary Secretary for Business Development. Following the Coalition's victory in the 2010 state elections, Atkinson was elected President of Victoria's Legislative Council.

Atkinson was reappointed to the role of Legislative Council President in December 2014, defeating Labor nominee Gayle Tierney. In 2019, media reported that Atkinson was an honorary member of a foreign influence organization known as the World Trade United Foundation, which has ties to the United Front Work Department of the Chinese Communist Party. In response, Atkinson claimed that he derived no financial benefit from the organization and that his title was solely honorific in nature. In May 2019, Atkinson became vice chairman of a water technology company that is linked to World Trade United Foundation.

On 9 June 2022, Atkinson announced that he would not be contesting the 2022 Victorian state election.

Victorian Legislative Council
Preceded by Bob Smith	President of the Victorian Legislative Council; 2010–2018	Succeeded by Shaun Leane
