= North-Eastern Metropolitan Region =

Electoral region of the Victorian Legislative Council

North-Eastern Metropolitan Region Victoria—Legislative Council
- Interactive map of electoral region boundaries from the 2022 state election, along with its composition of electoral districts
- State: Victoria
- Created: 2006
- MP: Richard Welch (Liberal); Shaun Leane (Labor); Nick McGowan (Liberal); Aiv Puglielli (Greens); Sonja Terpstra (Labor)
- Party: Labor (2); Liberal (2); Greens (1)
- Electors: 546,503 (2022)
- Area: 509 km^{2} (196.5 sq mi)
- Demographic: Metropolitan
- Coordinates: 37°48′S 145°11′E

North-Eastern Metropolitan Region, previously Eastern Metropolitan Region between 2006 and 2022, is one of the eight electoral regions of Victoria, Australia, which elects five members to the Victorian Legislative Council (also referred to as the upper house) by proportional representation. The region was created in 2006 following the 2005 reform of the Victorian Legislative Council. The region was renamed to its current name since the 2022 state election.

The region extends from Melbourne's inner eastern suburbs of Bulleen and Doncaster, north across the Yarra River to Lower Plenty and Eltham, and across to Bayswater, Croydon and Ferntree Gully (in the Dandenong Ranges) in the east below the Dandenong Ranges. It comprises the Legislative Assembly districts of Bayswater, Box Hill, Bulleen, Bundoora, Croydon, Eltham, Glen Waverley, Ivanhoe, Mill Park, Ringwood and Warrandyte.

== Members ==
Members for North-Eastern Metropolitan Region
Year	Member	Party	Member	Party	Member	Party	Member	Party	Member	Party
2006	Shaun Leane	Labor	Brian Tee	Labor	Richard Dalla-Riva	Liberal	Jan Kronberg	Liberal	Bruce Atkinson	Liberal
2010	Shaun Leane	Labor	Brian Tee	Labor	Richard Dalla-Riva	Liberal	Jan Kronberg	Liberal	Bruce Atkinson	Liberal
2014	Shaun Leane	Labor	Samantha Dunn	Greens	Richard Dalla-Riva	Liberal	Mary Wooldridge	Liberal	Bruce Atkinson	Liberal
2018	Shaun Leane	Labor	Sonja Terpstra	Labor	Rod Barton	Transport Matters	Mary Wooldridge	Liberal	Bruce Atkinson	Liberal
2020	Shaun Leane	Labor	Sonja Terpstra	Labor	Rod Barton	Transport Matters	Matthew Bach	Liberal	Bruce Atkinson	Liberal
2022	Shaun Leane	Labor	Sonja Terpstra	Labor	Aiv Puglielli	Greens	Matthew Bach	Liberal	Nick McGowan	Liberal
2024	Shaun Leane	Labor	Sonja Terpstra	Labor	Aiv Puglielli	Greens	Richard Welch	Liberal	Nick McGowan	Liberal

== Returned MLCs by seat ==
Seats are allocated by single transferable vote using group voting tickets. Changes in party membership between elections have been omitted for simplicity.

Election	1st MLC	2nd MLC	3rd MLC	4th MLC	5th MLC
2006	Liberal (Richard Dalla-Riva)	Labor (Shaun Leane)	Liberal (Bruce Atkinson)	Labor (Brian Tee)	Liberal (Jan Kronberg)
2010	Liberal (Richard Dalla-Riva)	Labor (Shaun Leane)	Liberal (Bruce Atkinson)	Liberal (Jan Kronberg)	Labor (Brian Tee)
2014	Liberal (Mary Wooldridge)	Labor (Shaun Leane)	Liberal (Bruce Atkinson)	Liberal (Richard Dalla-Riva)	Greens (Samantha Dunn)
2018	Labor (Shaun Leane)	Liberal (Mary Wooldridge)	Labor (Sonja Terpstra)	Liberal (Bruce Atkinson)	Transport Matters (Rod Barton)
2022	Labor (Shaun Leane)	Liberal (Matthew Bach)	Labor (Sonja Terpstra)	Liberal (Nick McGowan)	Greens (Aiv Puglielli)

== Election results ==
Labor and the Liberal Party were defending two seats each. The Transport Matters Party were defending one seat.

2022 Victorian state election: North-Eastern Metropolitan
Party	Candidate	Votes	%	±%
Quota		80,147		
Labor	1. Shaun Leane (elected 1); 2. Sonja Terpstra (elected 3); 3. Nildhara Gadani; 4. Rana Shahid Javed; 5. Kieran Simpson	162,183	33.73	−3.24
Liberal	1. Matthew Bach (elected 2); 2. Nick McGowan (elected 4); 3. Kirsten Langford; 4. Irene Ling; 5. Sally Houguet	145,788	30.32	−5.81
Greens	1. Aiv Puglielli (elected 5); 2. Sophia Sun; 3. Liz Chase; 4. Asher Cookson; 5. Sarah Newman	49,934	10.38	+1.39
Democratic Labour	1. Hugh Dolan; 2. Brenton van der Ende; 3. George Tsingopoulos; 4. James Tra	25,055	5.21	+3.51
Liberal Democrats	1. Maya Tesa; 2. Josh Lay	20,379	4.24	+0.07
Legalise Cannabis	1. Nicholas Wallis; 2. Anna Negri	15,357	3.19	+3.19
Family First	1. Alister Cameron; 2. Nina van Strijp	10,063	2.09	+2.09
Animal Justice	1. Chris Delforce; 2. Angel Aleksov	6,799	1.41	−0.99
Justice	1. Judith Thompson; 2. Annette Philpott	6,759	1.41	−1.12
One Nation	1. Peter Richardson; 2. William Turner	6,086	1.27	+1.27
Reason	1. Nina Springle; 2. Francis Cairns	4,774	0.99	−0.20
Freedom	1. Greg Cheesman; 2. Daniella Heatherich	4,684	0.97	+0.97
Shooters, Fishers, Farmers	1. Chris Banhidy; 2. Hugh Hanson	4,401	0.92	−0.33
Sack Dan Andrews	1. Serife Cobankara; 2. Husyin Cobankara	3,236	0.67	+0.67
Health Australia	1. Leesa Michelle Munro; 2. Andrew Hicks	3,171	0.66	+0.08
Victorian Socialists	1. Lucas Moore; 2. Lillian Kopschewa	2,585	0.54	+0.09
United Australia	1. Nathan Scaglione; 2. Irene Zivkovic	2,436	0.51	+0.51
Sustainable Australia	1. Jack Corcoran; 2. William Clow	1,875	0.39	−0.42
Companions and Pets	1. Craig Reid; 2. Julia Jones	1,738	0.36	+0.36
Angry Victorians	1. Wally Edwards; 2. Joe Gianfriddo	1,673	0.35	+0.35
Transport Matters	1. Rod Barton; 2. Kim Guest	1,023	0.21	−0.41
New Democrats	1. Darshan Lal Jaisinghani; 2. Rajat Garg; 3. Pushpdeep Narang	879	0.18	+0.18
Total formal votes		480,878	97.21	+0.33
Informal votes		13,484	2.79	−0.33
Turnout		494,672	91.68	−2.04
