= Electoral results for the Northern Victoria Region =

This is a list of electoral results for the Northern Victoria Region in Victorian state elections from the region's creation in 2006 until the present.

== Election results ==
=== Elections in the 2020s ===
==== 2022 ====
Labor were defending two seats. The Liberal/National coalition, Derryn Hinch's Justice Party, and the Liberal Democrats were defending one seat each.

2022 Victorian state election: Northern Victoria
Party	Candidate	Votes	%	±%
Quota		77,465		
Liberal/National Coalition	1. Wendy Lovell (elected 1); 2. Gaelle Broad (elected 3); 3. Amanda Millar; 4. Liz Fisher; 5. Jillian Merkel	162,860	35.04	+3.84
Labor	1. Jaclyn Symes (elected 2); 2. James McWhinney; 3. Gareth Mills; 4. Rahn Krammaer; 5. Mitch Bridges	134,057	28.84	−2.99
Greens	1. Cate Sinclair; 2. Lenka Thompson; 3. Ralf Thesing; 4. Rosemary Storey; 5. Robin David Chapman	32,399	6.97	+0.40
Shooters, Fishers, Farmers	1. Josh Knight; 2. Peter Watkins	23,715	5.10	−2.75
Legalise Cannabis	1. Adam Miller; 2. Christopher McInally	22,103	4.76	+4.76
One Nation	1. Rikkie-Lee Tyrrell (elected 5); 2. Nadine Edwards-Scott	17,306	3.72	+3.72
Liberal Democrats	1. Tim Quilty; 2. Tim Molesworth	9,249	1.99	−1.79
Justice	1. Tania Maxwell; 2. John Herron	9,140	1.97	−2.89
Family First	1. Michael White; 2. Carol Norton-Smith	7,600	1.64	+1.64
Animal Justice	1. Georgie Purcell (elected 4); 2. Michelle McGoldrick	7,239	1.56	−0.73
Democratic Labour	1. Mark Royal; 2. Ross McPhee	6,842	1.47	+0.02
Freedom	1. Christopher James Alan Neil; 2. Henk N. Wallenborn	4,968	1.07	+1.07
Health Australia	1. Kim Warner; 2. Shaun Moran	4,835	1.04	+0.07
Sack Dan Andrews	1. Yasemin Ceylan; 2. Mukadder Orhan	4,570	0.98	+0.98
Reason	1. Melanie Sharp; 2. Callum Chapman	3,755	0.81	+0.11
United Australia	1. Geoff Shaw; 2. Elijah Suares	3,620	0.78	+0.78
Companions and Pets	1. Laura Barnes; 2. Robert Britton	2,861	0.62	+0.62
Angry Victorians	1. Mark Jones; 2. Melanie Tomlin	2,229	0.48	+0.48
Victorian Socialists	1. Karen Hocking; 2. Emma Dynes	1,893	0.41	+0.12
Sustainable Australia	1. Ian Chivers; 2. Allan Doensen	1,599	0.34	−0.56
Transport Matters	1. Scott Cowie; 2. Neil Cullen	1,368	0.29	−0.13
New Democrats	1. Erin Sharma; 2. Brijesh Chopra; 3. Kuldeep Jitendrakumar Der; 4. Ravinder Singh Rana	576	0.12	+0.12
Total formal votes		464,784	96.93	+0.90
Informal votes		14,734	3.07	−0.90
Turnout		479,518	88.35	−2.40

=== Elections in the 2010s ===
==== 2018 ====
The Liberal/National coalition and Labor Party were defending two seats each, and Shooters, Fishers and Farmers were defending one seat.

2018 Victorian state election: Northern Victoria
Party	Candidate	Votes	%	±%
Quota		76,118		
Labor	1. Mark Gepp (elected 1); 2. Jaclyn Symes (elected 5); 3. Sukhraj Singh; 4. Jan Morgiewicz; 5. Glenn Matthews	145,408	31.83	+5.45
Liberal/National Coalition	1. Wendy Lovell (elected 2); 2. Luke O'Sullivan; 3. Brad Hearn; 4. Emma Williamson; 5. Robyne Head	142,566	31.20	−9.97
Shooters, Fishers, Farmers	1. Daniel Young; 2. Ben Podger	35,871	7.85	+4.35
Greens	1. Nicole Rowan; 2. Damien Stevens-Todd; 3. Elizabeth Matchett; 4. Julie Rivendell; 5. Matthew Thomas	30,022	6.57	−1.11
Justice	1. Tania Maxwell (elected 4); 2. Jodi Ayres	22,201	4.86	+4.86
Liberal Democrats	1. Tim Quilty (elected 3); 2. Iain King	17,286	3.78	+1.43
Animal Justice	1. Glynn Jarrett; 2. Robyn Masih	10,473	2.29	+0.52
Voluntary Euthanasia	1. Miranda Jones; 2. Craig Hill	9,182	2.01	+2.01
Country	1. Phil Larkin; 2. David Couston	7,961	1.74	−0.75
Democratic Labour	1. Chris McCormack; 2. Jarred Vehlen	6,639	1.45	−2.71
Aussie Battler	1. Dennis Lacey; 2. Erin Bruhn	6,471	1.42	+1.42
Health Australia	1. Isaac Golden; 2. Anne Sash	4,426	0.97	+0.97
Sustainable Australia	1. Madeleine Wearne; 2. Ian Chivers	4,127	0.90	+0.90
Hudson for Northern Victoria	1. Josh Hudson; 2. Shane O'Sullivan	4,121	0.90	+0.90
Liberty Alliance	1. Ewan McDonald; 2. James Wylie	3,732	0.82	+0.82
Reason	1. Martin Leahy; 2. Callum Chapman	3,176	0.70	−2.57
Transport Matters	1. Scott Cowie; 2. Eleanore Fitz	1,909	0.42	+0.42
Victorian Socialists	1. Moira Macdonald; 2. Michael McKenna	1,327	0.29	+0.29
Total formal votes		456,706	96.03	−1.22
Informal votes		18,905	3.97	+1.22
Turnout		475,611	90.75	−3.06

==== 2014 ====
2014 Victorian state election: Northern Victoria
Party	Candidate	Votes	%	±%
Quota		72,936		
Liberal/National Coalition	1. Wendy Lovell (elected 1); 2. Damian Drum (elected 3); 3. Amanda Millar; 4. Paul Weller; 5. Adrian Wolter	180,177	41.17	−7.22
Labor	1. Steve Herbert (elected 2); 2. Jaclyn Symes (elected 5); 3. Jamie Byron; 4. Lydia Senior; 5. Kate Sutherland	115,458	26.38	−1.10
Greens	1. Jenny O'Connor; 2. Michelle Goldsmith; 3. Kate Toll; 4. Dennis Black; 5. Robin Rhodes	33,627	7.68	−1.05
Democratic Labour	1. Gerard Murphy; 2. Stefan Kos	18,183	4.16	+2.58
Shooters and Fishers	1. Daniel Young (elected 4); 2. Anthony Donnellon	15,303	3.50	+3.50
Sex Party	1. Charlie Crutchfield; 2. Amy Mulcahy	14,325	3.27	−0.28
Palmer United	1. Hans Paas; 2. Owen Lysaght	12,631	2.89	+2.89
Family First	1. Alan Howard; 2. Jamie Baldwin	12,541	2.87	−0.04
Country Alliance	1. Robert Danieli; 2. Steven Threlfall	10,912	2.49	−4.31
Liberal Democrats	1. Tim Wilms; 2. Stephen Gream	10,279	2.35	+2.35
Animal Justice	1. Lola Currie; 2. Jethro Dean	7,759	1.77	+1.77
Rise Up Australia	1. Tim Middleton; 2. Petra Parker	2,743	0.63	+0.63
Cyclists	1. Mark Horner; 2. Arwen Birch	2,245	0.51	+0.51
People Power Victoria	1. Elizabeth Crooks; 2. John Cornish	1,431	0.33	+0.33
Total formal votes		437,614	97.25	
Informal votes		12,375	2.75	
Turnout		449,989	93.81	

==== 2010 ====
2010 Victorian state election: Northern Victoria
Party	Candidate	Votes	%	±%
Quota		64,946		
Liberal/National Coalition	1. Wendy Lovell (elected 1); 2. Damian Drum (elected 3); 3. Donna Petrovich (elected 5); 4. Reid Mather; 5. Martin Ireland	190,894	49.0	−1.3
Labor	1. Candy Broad (elected 2); 2. Kaye Darveniza (elected 4); 3. Jamie Byron; 4. Shaun Rosaia; 5. Anthony Sheridan	105,765	27.1	−3.0
Greens	1. David Jones; 2. Helen Robinson; 3. Hans Paas; 4. Kate Toll; 5. Ben Robertson	31,199	8.0	+0.7
Country Alliance	1. Steven Threlfall; 2. Frank Gaylard	26,646	6.8	+4.7
Sex Party	1. Tristram Chellew; 2. Justine Arfaras	14,880	3.8	+3.8
Family First	1. Laurie Wintle; 2. Neville Hunter	11,444	2.9	−0.8
Democratic Labor	1. Mark Royal; 2. John Carty	6,292	1.6	−0.5
Christian Democrats	1. Ewan McDonald; 2. Steve Flanagan	2,553	0.7	+0.2
Total formal votes		389,673	97.2	+1.3
Informal votes		11,220	2.8	−1.3
Turnout		400,893	93.4	+0.1

=== Elections in the 2000s ===
==== 2006 ====
2006 Victorian state election: Northern Victoria
Party	Candidate	Votes	%	±%
Quota		60,899		
Labor	1. Candy Broad (elected 1); 2. Kaye Darveniza (elected 5); 3. Marg Lewis; 4. Brad Dobson; 5. Jamie Byron	110,015	30.1	−7.3
Liberal	1. Wendy Lovell (elected 2); 2. Donna Petrovich (elected 4); 3. John Lithgow; 4. Zie Devereux; 5. Michael Gillies Smith	106,483	29.1	−0.7
National	1. Damian Drum (elected 3); 2. Rachel McAsey; 3. Justin Scholz; 4. Robert Mitchell; 5. Brian O'Sullivan	77,421	21.2	+1.9
Greens	1. Jennifer Alden; 2. Jon Baly; 3. Jenny O'Connor	26,603	7.3	+0.5
Family First	1. Nathan Hulls; 2. Mary Lou Corboy; 3. Nathanael Valentine; 4. Helen Leach	13,381	3.7	+3.7
Democratic Labor	1. Andrew Robinson; 2. Paul McCormack; 3. Sharon Lane	7,841	2.1	+2.1
Country Alliance	1. Danny Lee; 2. Fred Goodwin	7,495	2.1	+2.1
Group E	1. Stefano de Pieri; 2. Helen Healy; 3. Geoff Brown; 4. Joe Rocca; 5. Neil Fettling	7,487	2.1	+2.1
Group H	1. Laurie Whelan; 2. Peter O'Brien	4,287	1.2	+1.2
People Power	1. Denise Allen; 2. Phil Bachmann	2,497	0.7	+0.7
Christian Democrats	1. Phil Seymour; 2. Ewan McDonald	1,881	0.5	−0.1
Total formal votes		365,391	95.9	−0.5
Informal votes		15,426	4.1	+0.5
Turnout		380,817	93.3	
