= 2022 Victorian Legislative Council election =

2022 Victorian state election (Legislative Council)
- 26 November 2022

All 40 seats in the Victorian Legislative Council 20 seats needed for a majority
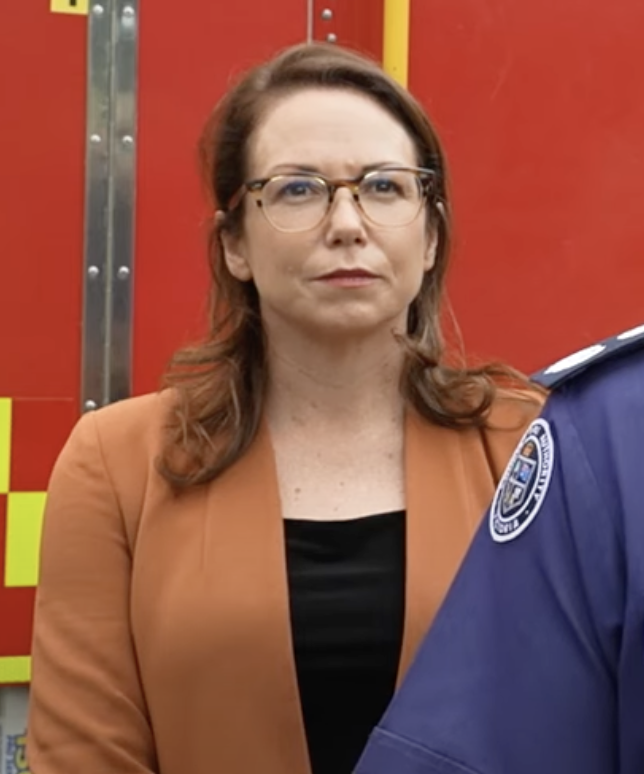

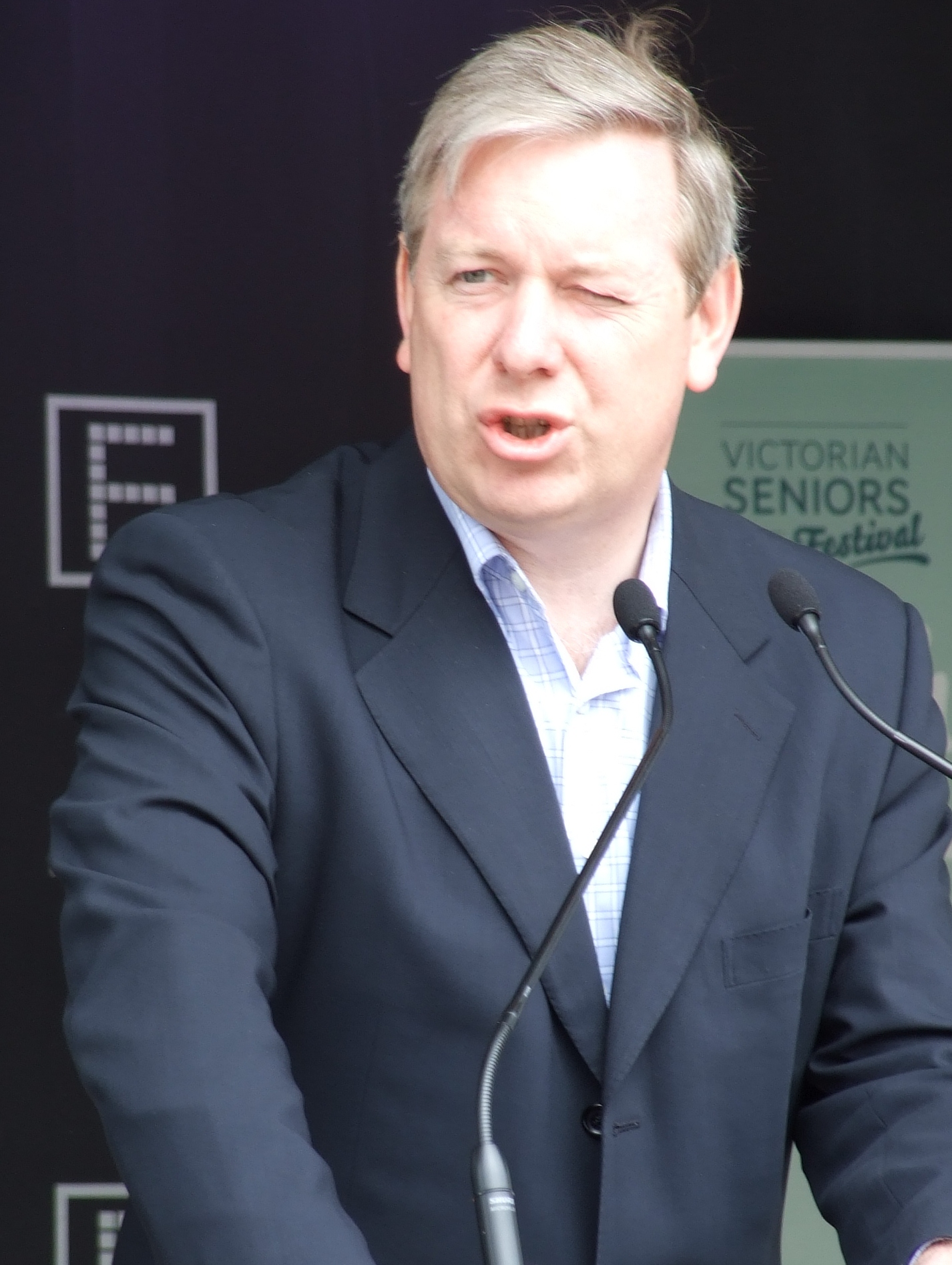

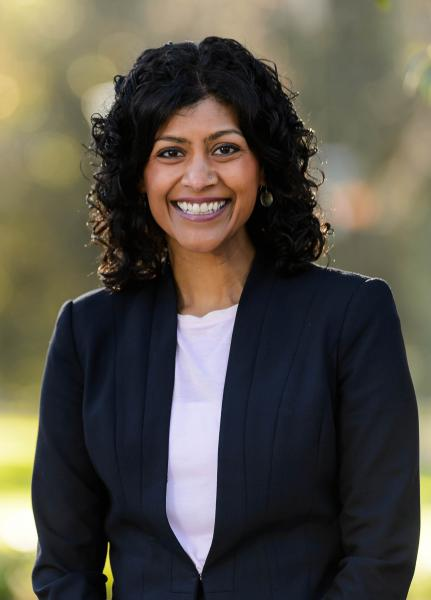

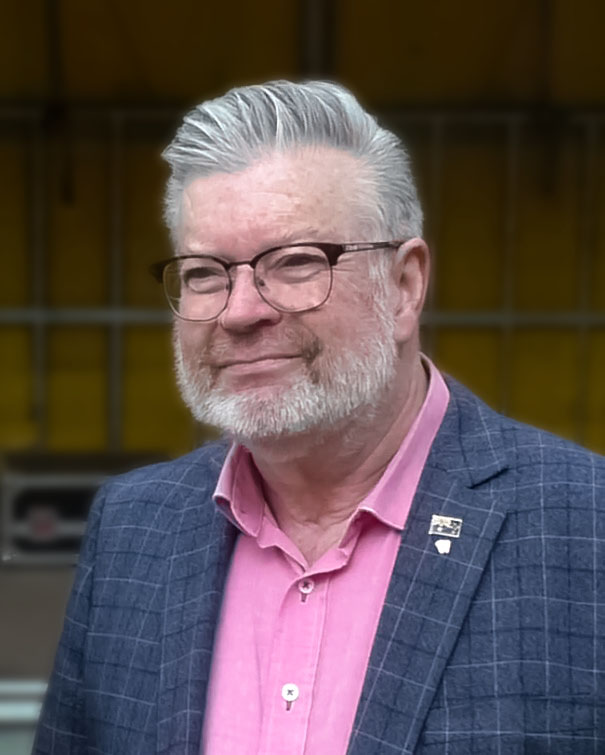

	First party	Second party	Third party
Leader	Jaclyn Symes	David Davis	Samantha Ratnam
Party	Labor	Liberal–National coalition	Greens
Leader's seat	Northern	Southern Metro	Northern Metro
Seats before	18	11	1
Seats won	15	14	4
Seat change	▼3	▲3	▲3
Primary vote	1,238,710	1,104,774	387,190
Percentage	33.01%	29.44%	10.32%
Swing	▼6.21pp	▲0.02pp	▲1.07pp
	Fourth party	Fifth party	Sixth party
	LCV		LDP
Leader	No leader	Bernie Finn	No leader
Party	Legalise Cannabis	Democratic Labour	Liberal Democrats
Alliance		MPA	MPA
Leader's seat	N/A	Western Metro (lost seat)	N/A
Seats before	0	1 (Note: Finn was originally elected as a member of the Liberal Party.)	2
Seats won	2	1	1
Seat change	▲2	Steady	▼1
Primary vote	153,347	131,600	99,054
Percentage	4.09%	3.51%	2.64%
Swing	▲4.09pp	▲1.41pp	▲0.14pp
	Seventh party	Eighth party	Ninth party
	SFF		AJP
Leader	Jeff Bourman	Warren Pickering	No leader
Party	SFF	One Nation	Animal Justice
Alliance	MPA
Leader's seat	Eastern	None (contested Eastern)	N/A
Seats before	1	0	1
Seats won	1	1	1
Seat change	Steady	▲1	Steady
Primary vote	76,742	76,734	56,819
Percentage	2.05%	2.04%	1.51%
Swing	▼0.97pp	▲2.04pp	▼0.96pp
- Results by region

This is a list of results in the Legislative Council for the 2022 Victorian state election.

== Statewide ==
Legislative Council (STV/GVT) – (CV)
Party	Votes	%	Swing	Seats	Change
Labor	1,238,710	33.01	-6.21	15	▼3
Liberal (metropolitan)	636,485	16.96	-0.19	8	▲1
Liberal/National joint ticket	468,289	12.48	+0.21		
Liberal (regional)				4	▲1
National				2	▲1
Coalition total	1,104,774	29.44	+0.02	14	▲3
Greens	387,190	10.32	+1.07	4	▲3
Legalise Cannabis	153,347	4.09	New	2	▲2
Democratic Labour	131,600	3.51	+1.41	1	▲1
Liberal Democrats	99,054	2.64	+0.14	1	▼1
Shooters, Fishers and Farmers	76,742	2.05	-0.97	1	Steady
One Nation	76,734	2.04	New	1	▲1
Family First	75,283	2.01	New	0	Steady
Justice	57,381	1.53	-2.22	0	▼3
Animal Justice	56,819	1.51	-0.96	1	Steady
Victorian Socialists	52,245	1.39	+0.48	0	Steady
Reason	47,070	1.25	-0.12	0	▼1
Freedom	39,910	1.06	New	0	Steady
Restore Democracy Sack Dan Andrews	31,262	0.83	New	0	Steady
United Australia	31,043	0.83	New	0	Steady
Health Australia	21,694	0.58	-0.21	0	Steady
Sustainable Australia	17,537	0.47	-0.36	0	▼1
Companions and Pets	16,464	0.44	New	0	Steady
Angry Victorians	14,896	0.40	New	0	Steady
Transport Matters	10,605	0.28	-0.34	0	▼1
New Democrats	7,743	0.21	New	0	Steady
Independents and ungrouped	4,303	0.11	+0.04	0	Steady
Total valid votes	3,752,406	96.78	–	–	–
Invalid/blank votes	124,726	3.22	–	–	–
Total	3,877,132	100.00	–	40	Steady
Registered voters / Turnout	4,394,465	88.23	–	–	–

The result in the Legislative Council meant the Labor Party and the left-leaning parties (namely the Greens, Legalise Cannabis, and Animal Justice) had a majority of seats in the chamber; 22 out of 40. After losing four out of five members via the group voting ticket system in the 2018 election, the Greens quadrupled their presence in the chamber. Notable results included the defeat of Reason Party leader Fiona Patten in the Northern Metropolitan region, defeated by former Labor minister and Democratic Labour Party candidate Adem Somyurek for the last position in the region, as well as the election of two Legalise Cannabis MPs to the parliament for the first time in the state's history. One Nation also elected its first state representative in Victoria.

== Regions ==
=== Eastern Victoria ===
Labor and the Liberal/National coalition were defending two seats each. The Shooters, Farmers and Fishers were defending one seat.

2022 Victorian state election: Eastern Victoria
Party	Candidate	Votes	%	±%
Quota		78,887		
Liberal/National Coalition	1. Renee Heath (elected 1); 2. Melina Bath (elected 3); 3. David Burgess; 4. Sharn Coombes; 5. Mick Harrington	172,208	36.38	+2.28
Labor	1. Tom McIntosh (elected 2); 2. Harriet Shing (elected 4); 3. Amie Templar-Kanshlo; 4. Jannette Langley; 5. Marg D'Arcy	125,481	26.51	−7.07
Greens	1. Mat Morgan; 2. Adam Frogley; 3. Jessica Wheelock; 4. Lynda Wheelock; 5. Rodrigo Bardales	37,795	7.99	+1.26
Legalise Cannabis	1. Thomas Forrest; 2. Mark Smith	19,654	4.15	+4.15
Democratic Labour	1. Philip Semmel; 2. Catherine Kennedy	18,117	3.83	+2.32
One Nation	1. Warren Pickering; 2. Jeff Waddell	16,964	3.58	+3.58
Shooters, Fishers, Farmers	1. Jeff Bourman (elected 5); 2. Kerrie-Anne Muir	14,217	3.00	−2.01
Liberal Democrats	1. Rob McCathie; 2. Angus Ward	12,130	2.56	−1.47
Justice	1. Ruth Stanfield; 2. Lachlan O'Connell	9,500	2.00	−2.47
Animal Justice	1. Austin Cram; 2. Jennifer McAdam	8,413	1.78	−1.45
Freedom	1. Greg Hansford; 2. Ray Akers	8,385	1.77	+1.77
Family First	1. Milton Wilde; 2. Natasha Sawtell	7,634	1.61	+1.61
Sack Dan Andrews	1. Cengiz Coskun; 2. Connie Coskun	3,984	0.84	+0.84
Reason	1. Dean Barnes; 2. Eve Cash	3,498	0.74	−0.07
United Australia	1. James William Unkles; 2. Paul Wilson	3,382	0.71	+0.71
Victorian Socialists	1. Richard Mann; 2. Natalie Acreman	2,300	0.49	+0.27
Angry Victorians	1. Shane Casey; 2. Virginia Rizzo; 3. Ben Marshall	2,280	0.48	+0.48
Companions and Pets	1. John Hutchison; 2. Sean Eddy	2,251	0.48	+0.48
Health Australia	1. Kristy Michelle Wallace; 2. Tania White	1,921	0.41	−0.48
Sustainable Australia	1. Sophie Paterson; 2. Anthony Cresswell	1,772	0.37	−0.50
Transport Matters	1. Ralf Troshen; 2. Mark Dunn	729	0.15	−0.41
New Democrats	1. Srilakshmi Ajjampura; 2. Komalben Rasiklal Darji; 3. Namrata Rajan Shah	533	0.11	+0.11
Independent	1. John O'Brien	170	0.04	+0.04
Total formal votes		473,318	96.94	+0.73
Informal votes		14,948	3.06	−0.73
Turnout		488,266	89.41	−1.67

=== North-Eastern Metropolitan ===
Labor and the Liberal Party were defending two seats each. The Transport Matters Party were defending one seat.

2022 Victorian state election: North-Eastern Metropolitan
Party	Candidate	Votes	%	±%
Quota		80,147		
Labor	1. Shaun Leane (elected 1); 2. Sonja Terpstra (elected 3); 3. Nildhara Gadani; 4. Rana Shahid Javed; 5. Kieran Simpson	162,183	33.73	−3.24
Liberal	1. Matthew Bach (elected 2); 2. Nick McGowan (elected 4); 3. Kirsten Langford; 4. Irene Ling; 5. Sally Houguet	145,788	30.32	−5.81
Greens	1. Aiv Puglielli (elected 5); 2. Sophia Sun; 3. Liz Chase; 4. Asher Cookson; 5. Sarah Newman	49,934	10.38	+1.39
Democratic Labour	1. Hugh Dolan; 2. Brenton van der Ende; 3. George Tsingopoulos; 4. James Tra	25,055	5.21	+3.51
Liberal Democrats	1. Maya Tesa; 2. Josh Lay	20,379	4.24	+0.07
Legalise Cannabis	1. Nicholas Wallis; 2. Anna Negri	15,357	3.19	+3.19
Family First	1. Alister Cameron; 2. Nina van Strijp	10,063	2.09	+2.09
Animal Justice	1. Chris Delforce; 2. Angel Aleksov	6,799	1.41	−0.99
Justice	1. Judith Thompson; 2. Annette Philpott	6,759	1.41	−1.12
One Nation	1. Peter Richardson; 2. William Turner	6,086	1.27	+1.27
Reason	1. Nina Springle; 2. Francis Cairns	4,774	0.99	−0.20
Freedom	1. Greg Cheesman; 2. Daniella Heatherich	4,684	0.97	+0.97
Shooters, Fishers, Farmers	1. Chris Banhidy; 2. Hugh Hanson	4,401	0.92	−0.33
Sack Dan Andrews	1. Serife Cobankara; 2. Husyin Cobankara	3,236	0.67	+0.67
Health Australia	1. Leesa Michelle Munro; 2. Andrew Hicks	3,171	0.66	+0.08
Victorian Socialists	1. Lucas Moore; 2. Lillian Kopschewa	2,585	0.54	+0.09
United Australia	1. Nathan Scaglione; 2. Irene Zivkovic	2,436	0.51	+0.51
Sustainable Australia	1. Jack Corcoran; 2. William Clow	1,875	0.39	−0.42
Companions and Pets	1. Craig Reid; 2. Julia Jones	1,738	0.36	+0.36
Angry Victorians	1. Wally Edwards; 2. Joe Gianfriddo	1,673	0.35	+0.35
Transport Matters	1. Rod Barton; 2. Kim Guest	1,023	0.21	−0.41
New Democrats	1. Darshan Lal Jaisinghani; 2. Rajat Garg; 3. Pushpdeep Narang	879	0.18	+0.18
Total formal votes		480,878	97.21	+0.33
Informal votes		13,484	2.79	−0.33
Turnout		494,672	91.68	−2.04

=== Northern Metropolitan ===
Labor were defending two seats. The Liberal Party, Greens, and Reason were defending one seat each.

2022 Victorian state election: Northern Metropolitan
Party	Candidate	Votes	%	±%
Quota		75,406		
Labor	1. Sheena Watt (elected 1); 2. Enver Erdogan (elected 4); 3. Susie Byers; 4. Chloe Gaul; 5. Ramy Aljalil	151,062	33.39	−9.18
Liberal	1. Evan Mulholland (elected 2); 2. Owen Guest; 3. Tim Staker-Gunn; 4. Melinda Tempany; 5. Hafiz Qadeer	85,359	18.87	+2.41
Greens	1. Samantha Ratnam (elected 3); 2. Esther Kennedy; 3. Sarah Jefford; 4. Michael Leach; 5. Kenna Morrison	84,127	18.59	+1.86
Democratic Labour	1. Adem Somyurek (elected 5); 2. Cary De Wit	21,684	4.79	+0.62
Victorian Socialists	1. Jerome Small; 2. Cathy Lewis	21,305	4.71	+0.52
Reason	1. Fiona Patten; 2. Judy Ryan; 3. Jenn Clark; 4. Marcella Brassett; 5. Tali Siani Jagielski	16,322	3.61	+0.24
Legalise Cannabis	1. Andrew Hale; 2. Renee Thompson	13,822	3.06	+3.06
Family First	1. Imad Hirmiz; 2. Denise Lowry	11,646	2.57	+2.57
Animal Justice	1. Leah Horsfall; 2. Bruce Poon	6,320	1.40	−0.62
Liberal Democrats	1. Paul Silverberg; 2. Rachel Versteegen	5,612	1.24	−0.13
United Australia	1. Kelly Moran; 2. Scott McCamish	5,601	1.24	+1.24
Freedom	1. Damien Richardson; 2. Cameron Stoddart	4,937	1.09	+1.09
Justice	1. Simone Philpott-Smart; 2. Thomas Stanfield	4,773	1.05	−0.97
One Nation	1. Jessica Davis; 2. Matthew Considine	4,251	0.94	+0.94
Shooters, Fishers, Farmers	1. Ethan Constantinou; 2. Ben Podger	3,470	0.77	−0.43
Sack Dan Andrews	1. Hatice Yesilagac; 2. Berke Yolcu	2,711	0.60	+0.60
Transport Matters	1. Georgia Diamantopoulos; 2. Francesco Raco	1,964	0.43	−0.17
Health Australia	1. Lisa Taggart; 2. Gabrielle Brodie	1,642	0.36	−0.46
Companions and Pets	1. Pauline Grutzner; 2. Linda Pullen	1,582	0.35	+0.35
Sustainable Australia	1. Alison Pridham; 2. Daryl Budgeon	1,480	0.33	−0.38
New Democrats	1. Amita Ros; 2. Pushpinder Singh; 3. Vikram Bhinder	1,456	0.32	+0.32
Angry Victorians	1. Nickee Freeman; 2. Jake Cashion	1,186	0.26	+0.26
Ind. (Indigenous)	Colin John Mancell	118	0.03	+0.03
Total formal votes		452,430	96.33	+1.13
Informal votes		17,223	4.80	−1.13
Turnout		496,653	85.07	−2.94

=== Northern Victoria ===
Labor were defending two seats. The Liberal/National coalition, Derryn Hinch's Justice Party, and the Liberal Democrats were defending one seat each.

2022 Victorian state election: Northern Victoria
Party	Candidate	Votes	%	±%
Quota		77,465		
Liberal/National Coalition	1. Wendy Lovell (elected 1); 2. Gaelle Broad (elected 3); 3. Amanda Millar; 4. Liz Fisher; 5. Jillian Merkel	162,860	35.04	+3.84
Labor	1. Jaclyn Symes (elected 2); 2. James McWhinney; 3. Gareth Mills; 4. Rahn Krammaer; 5. Mitch Bridges	134,057	28.84	−2.99
Greens	1. Cate Sinclair; 2. Lenka Thompson; 3. Ralf Thesing; 4. Rosemary Storey; 5. Robin David Chapman	32,399	6.97	+0.40
Shooters, Fishers, Farmers	1. Josh Knight; 2. Peter Watkins	23,715	5.10	−2.75
Legalise Cannabis	1. Adam Miller; 2. Christopher McInally	22,103	4.76	+4.76
One Nation	1. Rikkie-Lee Tyrrell (elected 5); 2. Nadine Edwards-Scott	17,306	3.72	+3.72
Liberal Democrats	1. Tim Quilty; 2. Tim Molesworth	9,249	1.99	−1.79
Justice	1. Tania Maxwell; 2. John Herron	9,140	1.97	−2.89
Family First	1. Michael White; 2. Carol Norton-Smith	7,600	1.64	+1.64
Animal Justice	1. Georgie Purcell (elected 4); 2. Michelle McGoldrick	7,239	1.56	−0.73
Democratic Labour	1. Mark Royal; 2. Ross McPhee	6,842	1.47	+0.02
Freedom	1. Christopher James Alan Neil; 2. Henk N. Wallenborn	4,968	1.07	+1.07
Health Australia	1. Kim Warner; 2. Shaun Moran	4,835	1.04	+0.07
Sack Dan Andrews	1. Yasemin Ceylan; 2. Mukadder Orhan	4,570	0.98	+0.98
Reason	1. Melanie Sharp; 2. Callum Chapman	3,755	0.81	+0.11
United Australia	1. Geoff Shaw; 2. Elijah Suares	3,620	0.78	+0.78
Companions and Pets	1. Laura Barnes; 2. Robert Britton	2,861	0.62	+0.62
Angry Victorians	1. Mark Jones; 2. Melanie Tomlin	2,229	0.48	+0.48
Victorian Socialists	1. Karen Hocking; 2. Emma Dynes	1,893	0.41	+0.12
Sustainable Australia	1. Ian Chivers; 2. Allan Doensen	1,599	0.34	−0.56
Transport Matters	1. Scott Cowie; 2. Neil Cullen	1,368	0.29	−0.13
New Democrats	1. Erin Sharma; 2. Brijesh Chopra; 3. Kuldeep Jitendrakumar Der; 4. Ravinder Singh Rana	576	0.12	+0.12
Total formal votes		464,784	96.93	+0.90
Informal votes		14,734	3.07	−0.90
Turnout		479,518	88.35	−2.40

=== South-Eastern Metropolitan ===
Labor were defending three seats. The Liberal Party and the Liberal Democrats were defending one seat each.

2022 Victorian state election: South-Eastern Metropolitan
Party	Candidate	Votes	%	±%
Quota		78,296		
Labor	1. Lee Tarlamis (elected 1) 2. Michael Galea (elected 3); 3. Tien Kieu; 4. Imran Khan; 5. Katrina Sullivan	184,810	39.34	−9.53
Liberal/National Coalition	1. Ann-Marie Hermans (elected 2); 2. Manju Hanumantharayappa; 3. Antonietta Moricca; 4. Lyndon Samuel; 5. Michael Keane	125,762	26.77	−2.80
Greens	1. Alex Breskin; 2. Louisa Willoughby; 3. Dewani Harahap; 4. Janet Wong; 5. Karen Jones	31,577	6.72	+1.20
Legalise Cannabis	1. Rachel Payne (elected 4) 2. Jeffrey Knipe	24,672	5.25	+5.25
Liberal Democrats	1. David Limbrick (elected 5) 2. Ethelyn King	16,971	3.61	+2.46
Democratic Labour	1. Jennifer Bowden; 2. Khalif White	15,399	3.28	+1.78
Justice	1. Derryn Hinch; 2. Mohit Dwivedi	9,334	1.99	−1.11
Family First	1. Lee Jones; 2. Colleen Hayward	9,025	1.92	+1.92
Freedom	1. Morgan Jonas; 2. Rebekah Spelman	8,306	1.77	+1.77
One Nation	1. Beth Stevens; 2. Cyndi Marr	8,299	1.77	+1.77
Animal Justice	1. Bronwyn Currie; 2. Davina Hinkley	6,481	1.38	−0.91
United Australia	1. Matt Babet; 2. Bobby Singh	5,495	1.17	+1.17
Sack Dan Andrews	1. Daniel Costin Puscasu; 2. Rodica Ianculescu	4,554	0.97	+0.97
Shooters, Fishers, Farmers	1. Grant Poulton; 2. Will Heily	4,112	0.88	−0.66
Health Australia	1. Geraldine Gonsalvez; 2. Kate Lukis	3,461	0.74	−0.11
Companions and Pets	1. Marissa Sarif; 2. Wendy Hutchison	2,425	0.52	+0.52
Reason	1. Martin Leahy; 2. Ethan Mileikowski	2,118	0.45	−0.37
Victorian Socialists	1. Lavanya Thavaraja; 2. Jaynaya Travis	1,895	0.40	+0.13
Sustainable Australia	1. Brandon Hoult; 2. Steven Armstrong	1,512	0.32	−0.36
Transport Matters	1. Norm Dunn; 2. Toni Peters	1,380	0.29	+0.94
Angry Victorians	1. Barry Edward Minster; 2. George Moliviatis	1,345	0.29	+0.29
New Democrats	1. Bhaveshkumar Lakhatariya; 2. Satinder Singh; 3. Nilam Dhaval Panchal; 4. Bhavika Amrutlal Patel	600	0.13	+0.13
Independent	1. Mehdi Sayed	242	0.05	+0.05
Total formal votes		469,775	96.29	+0.45
Informal votes		18,076	3.71	−0.45
Turnout		487,851	88.45	−1.32

=== Southern Metropolitan ===
Labor and the Liberal Party were defending two seats each. Sustainable Australia was defending one seat.

2022 Victorian state election: Southern Metropolitan
Party	Candidate	Votes	%	±%
Quota		78,309		
Liberal/National Coalition	1. David Davis (elected 1); 2. Georgie Crozier (elected 3); 3. Nick Stavrou; 4. Andrew Litwinow; 5. Monica Clark	169,681	36.11	−1.78
Labor	1. John Berger (elected 2); 2. Ryan Batchelor (elected 5); 3. Clive Crosby; 4. Lynn Psaila; 5. Muhammad Shahbaz	139,722	29.74	−5.45
Greens	1. Katherine Copsey (elected 4); 2. John Friend-Pereira; 3. Anna Parker; 4. Kylie Rocha; 5. Shanae Rowick	72,410	15.41	+2.31
Legalise Cannabis	1. Marc Selan; 2. Ben Howman	13,681	2.91	+2.91
Liberal Democrats	1. Matthew Ford; 2. David Segal	11,696	2.49	+0.96
Democratic Labour	1. Theodore Tsoingas; 2. Dean Chambers	10,385	2.21	+0.02
Reason	1. Andrew Johnson; 2. Stephen Jasper	9,511	2.02	+0.07
Animal Justice	1. Ben Schultz; 2. Michelle McGoldrick	6,698	1.43	−0.72
Sustainable Australia	1. Clifford Hayes; 2. Bettina Terry	5,170	1.10	−0.19
Family First	1. Vickie Janson; 2. Alex Van Der End	4,734	1.01	+1.01
Justice	1. Ellie Jean Sullivan; 2. Michaele Dale	3,807	0.81	−0.67
Sack Dan Andrews	1. Nursin Akdogan; 2. Reyhan Adonir	3,542	0.75	+0.75
One Nation	1. Chris Bradbury; 2. Craig Pickering	3,072	0.65	+0.65
Freedom	1. Natasha Kons; 2. Madeleine Kons	2,810	0.60	+0.60
Victorian Socialists	1. Jack Todaro; 2. Liam Kruger	2,516	0.54	+0.07
United Australia	1. Leon Kofmansky; 2. Julie McCamish	2,177	0.46	+0.46
Shooters, Fishers, Farmers	1. Nicole Bourman; 2. Michelle Collyer	1,966	0.42	−0.22
Health Australia	1. Kellie Thomas; 2. Mark Lambrick	1,935	0.41	−0.07
Transport Matters	1. Paul Tammesild; 2. Marc Peters	1,480	0.31	−0.04
Companions and Pets	1. Joan Molyneux; 2. Max Winch	1,257	0.27	+0.27
Angry Victorians	1. Dean Hurlston; 2. Robert John Kamp	915	0.19	+0.19
New Democrats	1. Krishna Dharmeshkumar Brahmbhatt; 2. Jigarkumar Ahbaysinh Chaudhary; 3. Ravinder Singh Marwaha	688	0.15	+0.15
Total formal votes		469,853	97.98	+0.45
Informal votes		9,702	2.02	−0.45
Turnout		479,555	88.45	−0.88

=== Western Metropolitan ===
Labor were defending three seats. The Liberal Party and Derryn Hinch's Justice Party were defending one seat each.

2022 Victorian state election: Western Metropolitan
Party	Candidate	Votes	%	±%
Quota		74,860		
Labor	1. Lizzie Blandthorn (elected 1); 2. Ingrid Stitt (elected 3); 3. Cesar Melhem; 4. Cuc Lum; 5. Nurul Khan	166,371	37.04	−9.81
Liberal	1. Moira Deeming (elected 2); 2. Trung Luu (elected 5); 3. Golam Haque; 4. Manish Patel; 5. Luan Walker	109,895	24.47	+3.65
Greens	1. Bernadette Thomas; 2. Sarah Bray; 3. Isabella McRae McLeod; 4. Lloyd Davies; 5. Pierre Vario	36,239	8.07	−0.04
Democratic Labour	1. Bernie Finn; 2. Thi Kiem-Lien Lee	23,422	5.21	+1.54
Legalise Cannabis	1. David Ettershank (elected 4); 2. Raffaela Menta	19,295	4.30	+4.30
Victorian Socialists	1. Liz Walsh; 2. Aran Mylvaganam	16,095	3.58	+3.02
Family First	1. Darren Buller; 2. Mary Filmer	14,261	3.18	+3.18
One Nation	1. Ursula Van Bree; 2. Frank Vrionis	7,691	1.71	+1.71
Liberal Democrats	1. Anthony Cursio; 2. Liam Roche	6,546	1.46	−0.26
Shooters, Fishers, Farmers	1. Ken Vickers; 2. Geoff Ashby	6,401	1.43	−0.59
Animal Justice	1. Meg Watkins; 2. Nat Kopas	6,209	1.38	−1.26
Justice	1. Peter Sullivan; 2. Jean-Marie D'Argent	5,371	1.20	−5.80
United Australia	1. Andrew Cuthbertson; 2. Deepak Bansal	4,747	1.06	+1.06
Sack Dan Andrews	1. Samson Palkuri; 2. Burkin Yalaz	3,653	0.81	+0.81
Reason	1. David Thirkettle-Watts; 2. Harry Millward	3,617	0.81	−0.24
Freedom	1. John McBride; 2. Dan McBride	3,513	0.78	+0.78
Angry Victorians	1. Catherine Cumming; 2. Adam Robinson; 3. Jennifer Zalme	2,569	0.57	+0.57
New Democrats	1. Kaushaliya Virjibhai Vaghela; 2. Mohammed Qasim Shaik; 3. Arix Maheshkumar Bishnoi; 4. Anitha Jyothi Palkuri; 5. Yogesh Kumar Malhotra	2,470	0.55	+0.55
Health Australia	1. Isaac Golden; 2. Leah Golden	2,122	0.47	−0.49
Sustainable Australia	1. Bert Jessup; 2. Dennis Bilic	2,046	0.46	−0.28
Independent Liberal	1. Fred Ackerman; 2. Mark Barro	1,845	0.41	+0.41
Companions and Pets	1. Craig Treherne; 2. Mary Britton	1,806	0.40	+0.40
Independent	1. Walter Villagonzalo; 2. Sam Alcordo	1,623	0.36	+0.36
Transport Matters	1. Daniel Lowinger; 2. Greg Collins	1,204	0.27	−0.41
Independent	Esther Demian	144	0.03	+0.03
Total formal votes		449,155	95.94	+0.79
Informal votes		19,025	4.06	−0.79
Turnout		468,180	87.00	−2.25

=== Western Victoria ===
Labor were defending two seats. The Liberal Party, Derryn Hinch's Justice Party, and the Animal Justice Party were defending one seat each.

2022 Victorian state election: Western Victoria
Party	Candidate	Votes	%	±%
Quota		82,036		
Labor	1. Jacinta Ermacora (elected 1); 2. Gayle Tierney (elected 3); 3. Megan Bridger-Darling; 4. Sue Pavlovich; 5. Heather Stokes	175,024	35.56	−2.66
Liberal/National Coalition	1. Bev McArthur (elected 2); 2. Joe McCracken (elected 5); 3. Anita Rank; 4. Angela Shearman; 5. Robert Letts	133,231	27.07	−2.80
Greens	1. Sarah Mansfield (elected 4); 2. John Barnes; 3. Judith Baldacchino; 4. Eva van der Vlies; 5. Linda Zibell	42,709	8.68	+1.18
Legalise Cannabis	1. Andrew Dowling; 2. Melanie Humphrey	24,763	5.03	+5.03
Shooters, Fishers, Farmers	1. Ben Collyer; 2. Graeme Standen	18,460	3.78	−0.67
Liberal Democrats	1. Julia McGrath; 2. Paul Barker	16,471	3.35	+0.71
One Nation	1. Terri Elizabeth Pryse-Smith; 2. Sabine De Pyle	13,065	2.65	+2.65
Democratic Labour	1. Costa Di Biase; 2. Ron Skrunzy	10,696	2.17	+0.60
Family First	1. Dean Conkwright; 2. Chioma Ikeh	10,320	2.10	+2.10
Justice	1. Stuart Grimley; 2. Simone O'Brien	8,697	1.77	−2.69
Animal Justice	1. Andy Meddick; 2. Hannah Wilshier	8,660	1.76	−1.01
Sack Dan Andrews	1. Tosh-Jake Finnigan; 2. Ismail Efe Celikdogen; 3. Sinan Orhan	5,012	1.02	+1.02
Victorian Socialists	1. Madilyn Gorman; 2. Abbey Randall	3,656	0.74	+0.00
United Australia	1. Natalie Valerie Failla; 2. Keith Raymond	3,620	0.73	+0.73
Reason	1. Emma Sinclair; 2. Olivia Hurley	3,475	0.71	−0.21
Angry Victorians	1. Chris Burson; 2. Richard Beeck	2,699	0.55	+0.55
Health Australia	1. Constantine Lazos; 2. Angelica Brennfleck	2,607	0.53	−0.20
Companions and Pets	1. Geoff Collins; 2. Simone Fisher	2,544	0.52	+0.52
Freedom	1. Antun Kovac; 2. Flor Vanessa Becerra-Kovac	2,307	0.47	+0.47
Sustainable Australia	1. Madeleine Wearne; 2. Robert Pascoe	2,083	0.42	−0.21
Transport Matters	1. Antonela Kearns; 2. Eddie Dunn	1,457	0.30	−0.23
New Democrats	1. Cecilia Gomez Benitez; 2. Vijaykumar Kachhia; 3. Hardik Bipinchandra Dave; 4. Jaymik Mahendrakumar Patel	541	0.11	+0.11
Ind. (Indigenous)	1. Storm Hellmuth	161	0.03	+0.03
Total formal votes		464,784	96.62	+0.75
Informal votes		14,734	3.38	−0.75
Turnout		509,387	89.20	−2.24
