= List of Victorian Legislative Council appointments =

This is a list of appointments to the Victorian Legislative Council, caused by the resignation or death of an incumbent member. A departure creates a casual vacancy which is filled by a candidate of the same affiliation in a joint sitting of the Parliament of Victoria. The constitution states that if the previous sitting Legislative Council member was at the time of his/her election the representative of a particular political party, that party should nominate a replacement from amongst its own members. This was introduced as part of reforms to the Legislative Council in 2003, taking effect from the 2006 election; prior to that time, casual vacancies in the Legislative Council had been filled through by-elections.

== List of appointments ==
Date	Region	Incumbent	Party	Appointee	Party	Cause
13 November 2024	Northern Metropolitan	Samantha Ratnam	Greens	Anasina Gray-Barberio	Greens	Resignation
17 August 2022	Eastern Victoria	Jane Garrett	Labor	Tom McIntosh	Labor	Death
22 June 2022	South Eastern Metropolitan	David Limbrick	Liberal Democrats	David Limbrick	Liberal Democrats	Resignation
2 December 2021	Eastern Metropolitan	Edward O'Donohue	Liberal	Cathrine Burnett-Wake	Liberal	Resignation
13 October 2020	Northern Metropolitan	Jenny Mikakos	Labor	Sheena Watt	Labor	Resignation
23 April 2020	South Eastern Metropolitan	Gavin Jennings	Labor	Lee Tarlamis	Labor	Resignation
5 March 2020	Eastern Metropolitan	Mary Wooldridge	Liberal	Matthew Bach	Liberal	Resignation
15 August 2019	Southern Metropolitan	Philip Dalidakis	Labor	Enver Erdogan	Labor	Resignation
21 February 2018	Western Metropolitan	Colleen Hartland	Greens	Huong Truong	Greens	Resignation
19 October 2017	Northern Metropolitan	Greg Barber	Greens	Samantha Ratnam	Greens	Resignation
7 June 2017	Northern Victoria	Steve Herbert	Labor	Mark Gepp	Labor	Resignation
12 October 2016	Northern Victoria	Damian Drum	National	Luke O'Sullivan	National	Resignation
15 April 2015	Eastern Victoria	Danny O'Brien	National	Melina Bath	National	Resignation
11 June 2014	Northern Victoria	Candy Broad	Labor	Marg Lewis	Labor	Resignation
26 March 2014	Eastern Victoria	Peter Hall	National	Danny O'Brien	National	Resignation
5 February 2014	Eastern Victoria	Philip Davis	Liberal	Andrew Ronalds	Liberal	Resignation
21 August 2013	Northern Victoria	Donna Petrovich	Liberal	Amanda Millar	Liberal	Resignation
8 May 2013	Western Metropolitan	Martin Pakula	Labor	Cesar Melhem	Labor	Resignation
8 May 2013	Northern Metropolitan	Theo Theophanous	Labor	Nathan Murphy	Labor	Resignation
3 February 2009	Southern Metropolitan	Evan Thornley	Labor	Jennifer Huppert	Labor	Resignation

== See also ==
- List of Victorian state by-elections
