= Parliament of Victoria =

State legislature of Victoria, Australia

Coordinates: 37.811055°S 144.97329°E

- 60th Parliament
- Coat of Arms of Victoria

- Parliament of Victoria logo

Type
- Type: Bicameral
- Houses: Legislative Council; Legislative Assembly
- Sovereign: King (represented by the governor of Victoria)

History
- Founded: 21 November 1856; 170 years ago

Leadership
- Monarch: Charles III since 8 September 2022
- Governor: Margaret Gardner since 9 August 2023
- President of the Legislative Council: Shaun Leane, Labor since 20 December 2022
- Speaker of the Legislative Assembly: Maree Edwards, Labor since 2 August 2022
- Premier: Ben Carroll, Labor since 28 July 2026
- Leader of the Opposition: Jess Wilson, Liberal since 18 November 2025

Structure
- Seats: 128; 88 MLAs; 40 MLCs
- Legislative Assembly political groups: Government (54): Labor (54); Opposition (29): Liberal (20); National (9); Crossbench (4): Greens (2); Independent (1); Independent Labor (1)
- Legislative Council political groups: Government (15): Labor (15); Opposition (13): Liberal (11); National (2); Crossbench (12): Greens (4); Legalise Cannabis (2); Animal Justice (1); Libertarian (1); One Nation (1); Shooters, Fishers, Farmers (1); Independent (2)

Elections
- Legislative Assembly voting system: Full preferential voting
- Legislative Council voting system: Single transferable vote
- Last general election: 26 November 2022
- Next general election: 28 November 2026

Meeting place
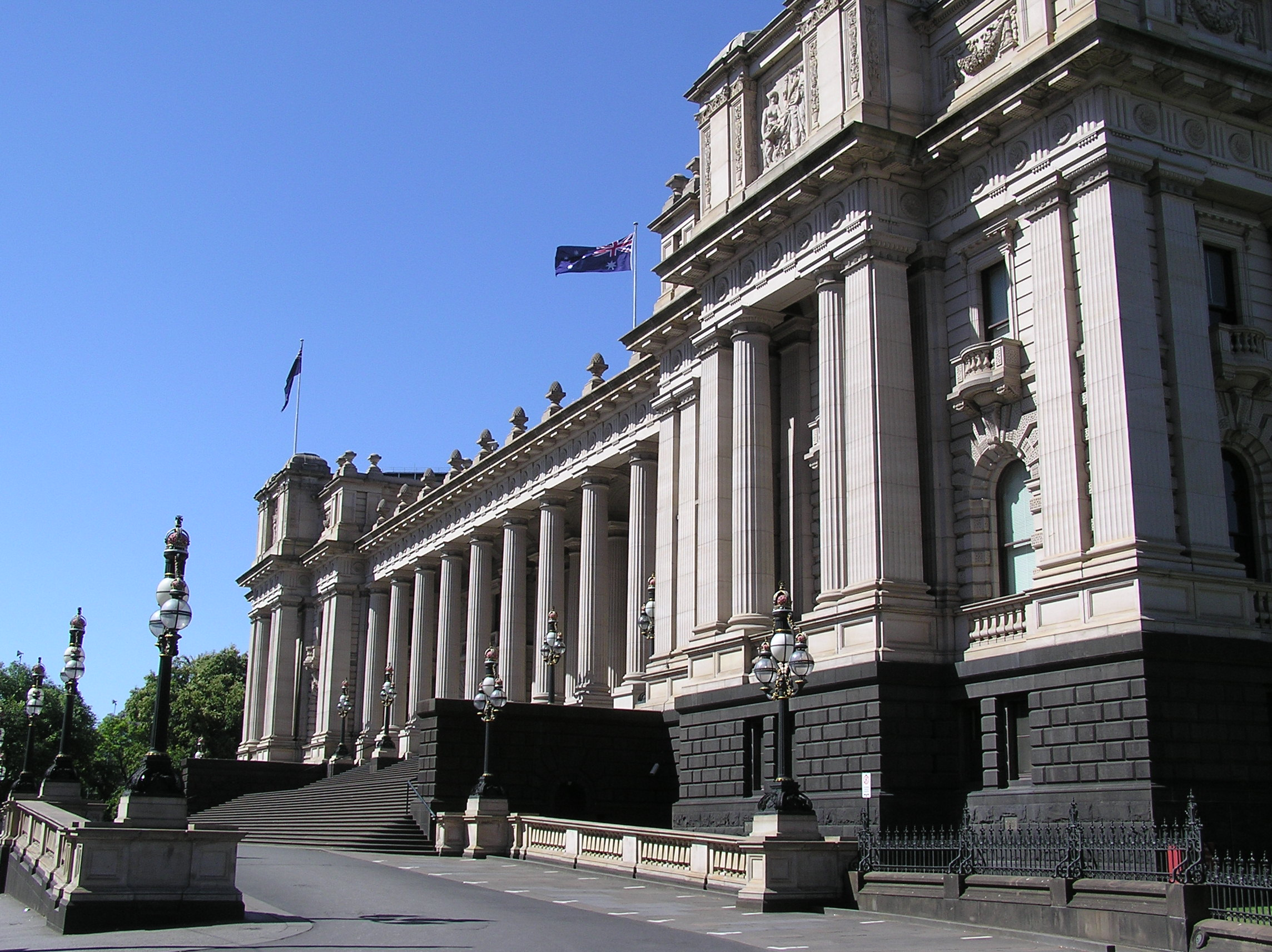
- Parliament House, East Melbourne, Victoria, Australia

Website
- parliament.vic.gov.au

Constitution
- Constitution of Victoria

The Parliament of Victoria is the bicameral legislature of the Australian state of Victoria. It follows a Westminster-derived parliamentary system and consists of the King, represented by the governor of Victoria, the Legislative Assembly and the Legislative Council. Members of the Victorian government are drawn from both chambers, creating a fused executive. The parliament meets at Parliament House in the state capital Melbourne. The current Parliament was elected on 26 November 2022, sworn in on 20 December 2022 and is the 60th parliament in Victoria.

The two Houses of Parliament have 128 members in total, 88 in the Legislative Assembly (lower house) and 40 in the Legislative Council (upper house). Victoria has compulsory voting and uses full preferential voting in single-member seats for the Legislative Assembly, and single transferable vote in multi-member seats for the proportionally represented Legislative Council. The council is described as a house of review. Majorities in the Legislative Council are rare, so the government of the day must negotiate with other parties to pass much of its legislative agenda. All members serve four-year terms. The parliament's functions and processes have evolved over time, undergoing significant changes as Victoria changed from an independent colony to a state within the federated Australia.

The Parliament may make laws for any matter within Victoria, subject to some referendum requirements in the Victorian Constitution. Its power is further limited by the ability for the federal laws to override state laws, subject to the Australian Constitution. State courts are responsible for interpreting the laws of Parliament, subject to appeal to the High Court of Australia. The parliament is also vested with other powers, such as the means to investigate matters, conduct research and summon witnesses.

Government is formed by the party or parties who command confidence and supply within the Assembly. The leader of the governing party or parties is the premier, the most senior elected member of Victoria's executive government. Victorians do not directly elect the premier, and the leader of the majority party is appointed premier by the governor. Ben Carroll has been the premier since his selection as leader of the Labor Party on 28 July 2026, following Jacinta Allan's resignation.

== History ==
=== Location ===
Parliament has sat at Parliament House, Melbourne since 1856, with the exception of the period 1901–1927, when Parliament House was used by the Federal Parliament and the Parliament of Victoria sat at the Royal Exhibition Building. The building has undergone significant renovations since its initial construction as it has been expanded, repaired and restored over time. The first major works were conducted in the 1930s, using a £50,000 contribution from the Australian federal government paid in gratitude for the use of the building. Further construction was undertaken throughout the 1970s to make temporary offices for members of Parliament, although these were not modernised until further works began in 2015. Sections of the structure's outer walls have gradually been replaced over time.

=== Early parliamentary history ===
Prior to 1851 the area of Australia now known as Victoria was part of the colony of New South Wales and was administered by the Government of New South Wales in Sydney. On 5 August 1850, the Parliament of the United Kingdom passed the Australian Constitutions Act 1850 (13 & 14 Vict. c. 59 (Imp)) which made provision for the separation of Victoria from New South Wales. Enabling legislation was passed by the Parliament of New South Wales, and Victoria was formally created a separate colony of the United Kingdom on 1 July 1851.

The Australian Constitutions Act 1850 provided for the colony to be administered by a lieutenant-governor and a Legislative Council of 51 members, 21 of which were to be elected and the remainder appointed by the Lieutenant-Governor. The lieutenant-governor was subordinate in some matters to the governor of New South Wales, who was given the title governor-general. The Legislative Council met for the first time in November 1851 at St Patrick's Hall, Melbourne. The first Legislative Council existed for five years and was responsible for at least three significant and enduring contributions to the parliamentary system of Victoria: drafting the first Constitution of Victoria, ensuring a secret ballot within elections (a novelty within the British Empire at the time), and ordering the construction of Victorian Parliament House in Melbourne.

The Victorian Constitution was approved by the Legislative Council in March 1854. It was the sent to Britain where it was passed by the United Kingdom Parliament as the Victoria Constitution Act 1855. It was granted royal assent on 16 July 1855 and was proclaimed in Victoria on 23 November 1855. The constitution established the Westminster-style system of responsible government that continues in Victoria today. It further stipulated several preconditions on voting that have since been rescinded such as restricting voting to only men of at least 21 years of age who met minimum wealth standards. Rural districts were also very over-represented in order to favour large landowners.

The election for the first Victorian Parliament was held during the spring of 1856, the first Victorian Members of Parliament met on 21 November 1856 in the recently completed Parliament House and were sworn in, and on 25 November 1856 the first Victorian Parliament was officially opened by acting governor Major-General Edward Macarthur. The Legislative Council consisted of thirty members representing six Provinces, each province returning five members. The Legislative Assembly consisted of sixty members representing thirty-seven multi and single-member electorates.

=== Expansion of suffrage ===
Although Indigenous Australians were denied the vote in some states, Victoria did not directly legislate voting based on race. Therefore, Indigenous Victorian men were entitled to vote from 1857, provided they met the other requirements. Furthermore, Indigenous Victorians who enrolled to vote in Victoria were allowed to vote in federal elections from 1901.

The 1903 constitution, similar to the functional constituencies in China, reserved two seats in the Legislative Assembly to be elected by and from Railway Officers and similarly one seat for Public Officers, and one seat in the Legislative Council for both groups combined. In 1907, these four seats were abolished and such officers voted instead in their electoral district and province and were otherwise prohibited from political campaigning.

Voting was initially restricted based on gender, though. Victoria was the last state within Australia to intentionally recognise female voters. The Electoral Act 1863 granted the vote to all rate payers, which included some women at the time. Therefore, women were legally allowed to, and indeed did, vote in the election of 1864. The act was clarified in 1865 to exclude women. Agitation for allowing women to vote began in earnest in 1891, with presentation of an immense Victorian Women's Suffrage Petition containing over 30,000 signatures was presented to the parliament. This petition was proudly used as a promotional tool for the federation of Australia. The newly federated nation allowed women to vote in elections, as well as stand for office, since 1902. Yet Victoria did not expand its suffrage to include women until 1908, nor allow women to stand for office until 1924. The first woman was not elected into the Victorian Parliament until 1933.

Political parties began to increase in size and influence throughout the 1890s, leading to further agitation for changes to the vote. This also led to voting within each chamber becoming more predictable, as strong party discipline began to form among party members, mostly aligned to three broad ideals: the labour movement, liberal movement and rural interests. Victoria's two-party system took hold, usually as a contest between the Labor Party and a coalition formed by the Country Party (now known as the Nationals) and the more recent Liberal Party.

The principle of ensuring that rural regions, which typically represented the landed gentry when Victoria first formed, were over-represented in parliament was also rescinded. One-man-one vote was adopted in 1899 in the Legislative Assembly, and expanded to the Legislative Council in 1937. Wealth requirements for voting in the Legislative Assembly were removed in 1857, but this reform was not made to the Legislative Council until 1950. Furthermore, the method of voting was changed; first-past-the-post voting was replaced with preferential voting for the Legislative Assembly in 1911 and compulsory voting introduced in 1923. Meanwhile, the preferential voting was used for elections to the Legislative Council from 1921, and elections made compulsory in 1935.

Voting was further expanded in 1973, when the voting age was lowered from 21 to 18. The minimum age for membership of either house was also lowered to 18.

=== Expansion of voting divisions ===
Legislative Council boundary changes

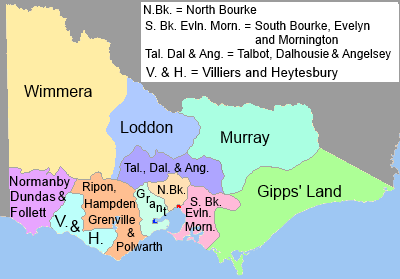
Initial electoral boundaries, 1851

Present boundaries, 2014-2022

The number of divisions within each of the chambers was gradually increased over time. The Legislative Council was expanded from 30 members representing 6 provinces to its peak of 48 members spread throughout 14 provinces by 1888. The number of both provinces and members continued to change until it remained relatively fixed by 1974, when 44 members represented 22 provinces. Furthermore, the members were distributed evenly, rather than a mixture of single and multi-member districts as the chamber was at its creation.

The Legislative Assembly has similarly fluctuated in size over time. It contained 60 seats within its first iteration in 1856, eventually growing to as many as 95 by 1900. It was not until 1958 when all divisions were up for election at the same time, though, when all of the then 66 seats were contested. The Assembly reached 88 seats in 1985 and has remained at this number ever since.

=== Current voting methods and districts ===
Until November 2006, the Legislative Council had 44 members serving eight-year terms, elected from single-member constituencies, with half the seats falling vacant every four years. Since then it has had 40 members, each serving four-year terms. They are elected from eight multi-member constituencies, each returning five members, and elected by proportional representation. Since 2006, the Legislative Assembly has had 88 members elected for fixed four-year terms from single-member constituencies, using preferential voting.

Fixed four-year terms were introduced for both houses in 2003, replacing the previous provision that allowed the government to expire after no more than four years. (Note: Between 1985 and 2006, the maximum term of the Assembly was four years, but could be dissolved earlier.)

== Composition and electoral systems ==
Parliament consists of the King and two houses: the Legislative Assembly and the Legislative Council. The governor acts on behalf of the monarch.

All members of both houses are elected for fixed four-year terms. General elections are held on the last Saturday in November every four years with the parliament expiring on the Tuesday twenty-five days before the election. The most recent general election was held on 26 November 2022.

Parliament can be dissolved earlier by the governor, and a general election called, in two exceptional circumstances:

- the Legislative Assembly passes a motion of no confidence in the government or its ministers, or
- the Legislative Council and Legislative Assembly are deadlocked and cannot agree to pass a bill.

Anyone enrolled to vote in Victoria can stand for election as a candidate for either House, except for:

- a judge of the Victorian Courts,
- a member of the Commonwealth Parliament,
- an undischarged bankrupt, or
- someone convicted of a serious criminal offence.

It is also not permitted to be a member of both houses or a candidate for election to both houses of Parliament.

Members of Parliament may be addressed by their name or by using their electorate, for example "The Member for Hawthorn" or "Member for Southern Metropolitan Region", and are entitled to the postnominal letters MLC if a Member of the Legislative Council, and MLA or MP if a Member of the Legislative Assembly. Ministers and former ministers are entitled to the style "The Honourable" (abbreviated to "The Hon") although some choose not to use it.

The government of the day sits on benches to the right of the presiding officer within each chamber, while the opposition sits to the left. Members of a house who are not part of either the official government or opposition sit on the benches in between them, called the cross bench. This arrangement is used in the Legislative Council even though the governing parties rarely command a majority within it.

The Government and Opposition appoint members as Managers of Government and Opposition Business in each house. These members are not within the control of the house in the same way that the president and speaker are, they are appointed by the premier and the leader of the Opposition respectively. Each party represented in each house appoints a member as their party whip. The whip's main duty is to ensure that all of the members of their party are present within a chamber when a formal vote takes place.

=== Legislative Assembly ===
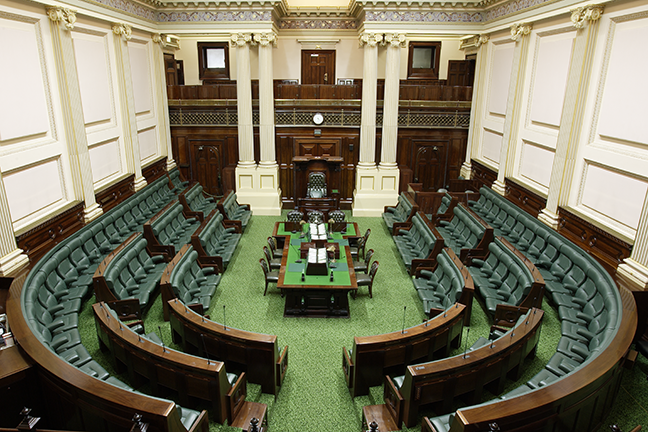
Victorian Legislative Assembly

The Legislative Assembly is the house of government, in that the government of the day must command a majority of support in this chamber. Furthermore, the premier and ministers are accountable to Parliament and must face questioning and scrutiny from Parliament. The Assembly schedules question time and has time and subject limits on the ways that Ministers must respond to matters raised to them by any other member of the Assembly.

It consists of 88 members who are elected for four-year terms using full preferential voting. Casual vacancies in the Assembly are filled by a by-election within the electorate.

The Assembly functions as a representation of Victoria and commanding a majority within the Assembly provides a mandate for government policies. The Assembly is the only chamber authorised to draw funds from the public treasury, or to raise taxes, on its own initiative. Changes to taxation or funding for projects can still be debated by the Council, but the Assembly may always authorise funding for the ordinary operation of government without needing Council approval. If the Council does not pass the Assembly's budget within a month it is passed to the governor for royal assent regardless. This means that, unlike the Australian Senate, the other chamber of Victoria's parliament cannot block supply for government funding.

The Assembly has increased in power over time compared to the Legislative Council. It is assumed that the government of the day will act upon the initiatives it campaigned on and the Assembly serves as a direct link between local members and each individual constituency. Furthermore, while it is not a requirement that ministers come from the Assembly, it is convention that more members of the executive branch sit within the Assembly than the Council.

Most bills originate within the Assembly, partly as a matter of convention and mostly due to the fact that bills not sponsored by the government are unlikely to be passed. A bill typically goes through three readings, each followed by a vote, before being presented to the Legislative Council.

=== Legislative Council ===
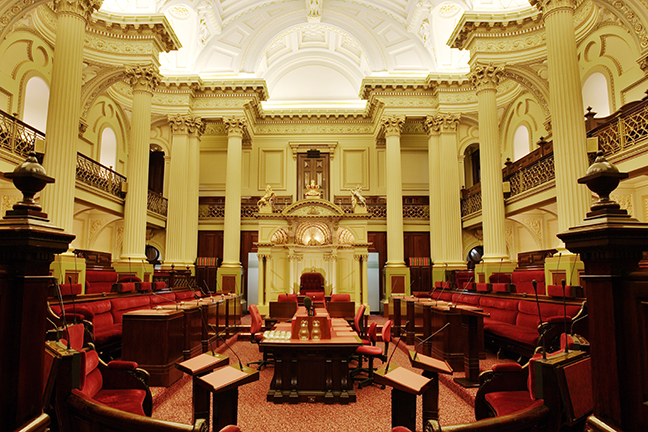
Victorian Legislative Council

The Legislative Council primarily acts as a house of review. It has equal power to the Legislative of Assembly, except in relation to appropriation bills. It contains 40 members, elected from eight multi-member electorates known as regions. Each region returns five members for a four-year term. Each region contains eleven divisions from the Legislative Assembly. The Council is elected using a single transferable vote with the option of group voting tickets. Casual vacancies are filled by a joint-sitting of both houses. The new member must be from the same party as the original member was at the time of their election.

The Council's power has decreased over time, as its role has changed. It was initially a means of suppressing democratic reforms, particularly since the more representative Assembly was seen as too liberal and radical. It now serves as a house of review, more closely modelled on the Australian Senate than on the United Kingdom's House of Lords. Majorities within the Council are rare by design, while minority interest groups are more likely to be elected than within the Assembly, encouraging debate and compromise.

The governor's opening address to Parliament occurs in the Council. The governor does not enter the Assembly, in keeping with the Westminster tradition of regal and vice-regal persons not entering into the chamber modelled on the House of Commons.

Bills passed by the Assembly must also pass the Council within the same form. Either house can propose amendments to bills and all bills and their amendments, with the exception of supply bills, must pass both houses. The Council may debate supply bills but cannot amend them. In the event that the Council does not pass a budget within a month of it passing the Assembly it is passed onto the governor for royal assent regardless of how (or even if) the Council voted on it.

=== Presiding officers ===
The speaker of the Legislative Assembly is the presiding officer of the Legislative Assembly. The speaker is an elected member of the parliament and is chosen by the members of the Legislative Assembly to chair their meetings and represent the assembly as a whole at official functions. The corresponding person in the Legislative Council is the president of the Legislative Council. Both the speaker and the president have important powers in controlling debate in their respective chambers, including the ability to punish members who step out of line or disobey their orders. The presiding officers also have powers to summon witnesses to the chamber to assist in the legislative role of Parliament.

The presiding officers also oversee votes within their respective chambers and provide proof of assent in the instance that a bill is passed. This proof is needed for a bill to be presented to the governor for royal assent.

The presiding officers' voting roles are different. The speaker of the Assembly only has a casting vote, while the president of the Council only has a deliberative vote. The speaker may therefore only vote when a matter is tied, with their casting vote determining the outcome. This is consistent with the Westminster tradition of the speaker acting as an impartial arbiter. Some pieces of legislation, such as altering the Constitution, require an absolute majority (45 of the 88 possible votes) to pass. It is therefore mathematically impossible for a speaker to pass such legislation with their casting vote, as the largest possible tied vote is 43:43. The president used to have the same power, but their role has changed over time. Consequently, the president now has a deliberative vote but not a casting vote. This is modelled on the Australian Senate and ensures that a region of Victoria would not be deprived of one of its five votes. A tied vote in the council is considered to have failed to pass regardless of how the president cast their vote. The president does not need to move to one end of the chamber during a division, but instead advises the clerk which way they are voting.

== Parliamentary Committees ==
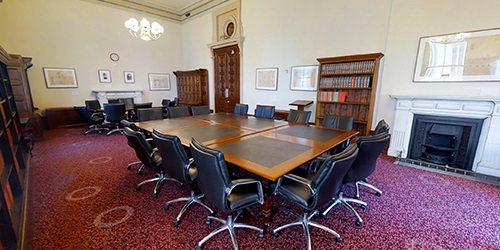
Knight Kerr Room, often used by Parliamentary Committees

Committees are made of members of either house. They have a specifically defined role designed to seek community input about ideas or to investigate matters Parliament deems important. The membership of a committee is determined by the parliament, usually as a new parliament begins. Each committee contains members of many political parties, not just the governing parties, although the government still generally aims to give itself functional majorities within each committee. Lobbyists, members of the public and organisations communicate with committees in order to give input into the drafting of bills. The Parliament of Victoria outlines the committee process as:

1. Terms of reference
2. Calling for submissions
3. Public hearings
4. Research
5. Reporting to Parliament
6. Government response

The government will usually be given six months to respond to the committee's recommendations. As they need as broad an understanding as possible of the issues at hand, committees may perform inquiries with the authority to subpoena documents and summon witnesses. This assists with research and is a means of holding parties to account. Committees have broad powers when performing inquiries although there are some legal protections in place for witnesses, similar to those for witnesses in the judicial system.

The different types of committees are: joint investigatory committees, comprising members of both houses, standing committees, comprising members of the Legislative Council, select committees, comprising members of one house or the other, and domestic committees, which are generally closed to the public as they concern matters of the parliament itself.

Parliament's current committees are:

=== Joint committees ===
- Dispute Resolution
- Electoral Oversight
- Integrity and Oversight
- Public Accounts and Estimates
- Scrutiny of Acts and Regulations

=== Legislative Council committees ===
- Economy and Infrastructure
- Environment and Planning
- Legal and Social Issues
- Privileges
- Procedure

=== Legislative Assembly committees ===
- Economy and Infrastructure
- Environment and Planning
- Legal and Social Issues
- Privileges
- Procedure

== Procedure ==
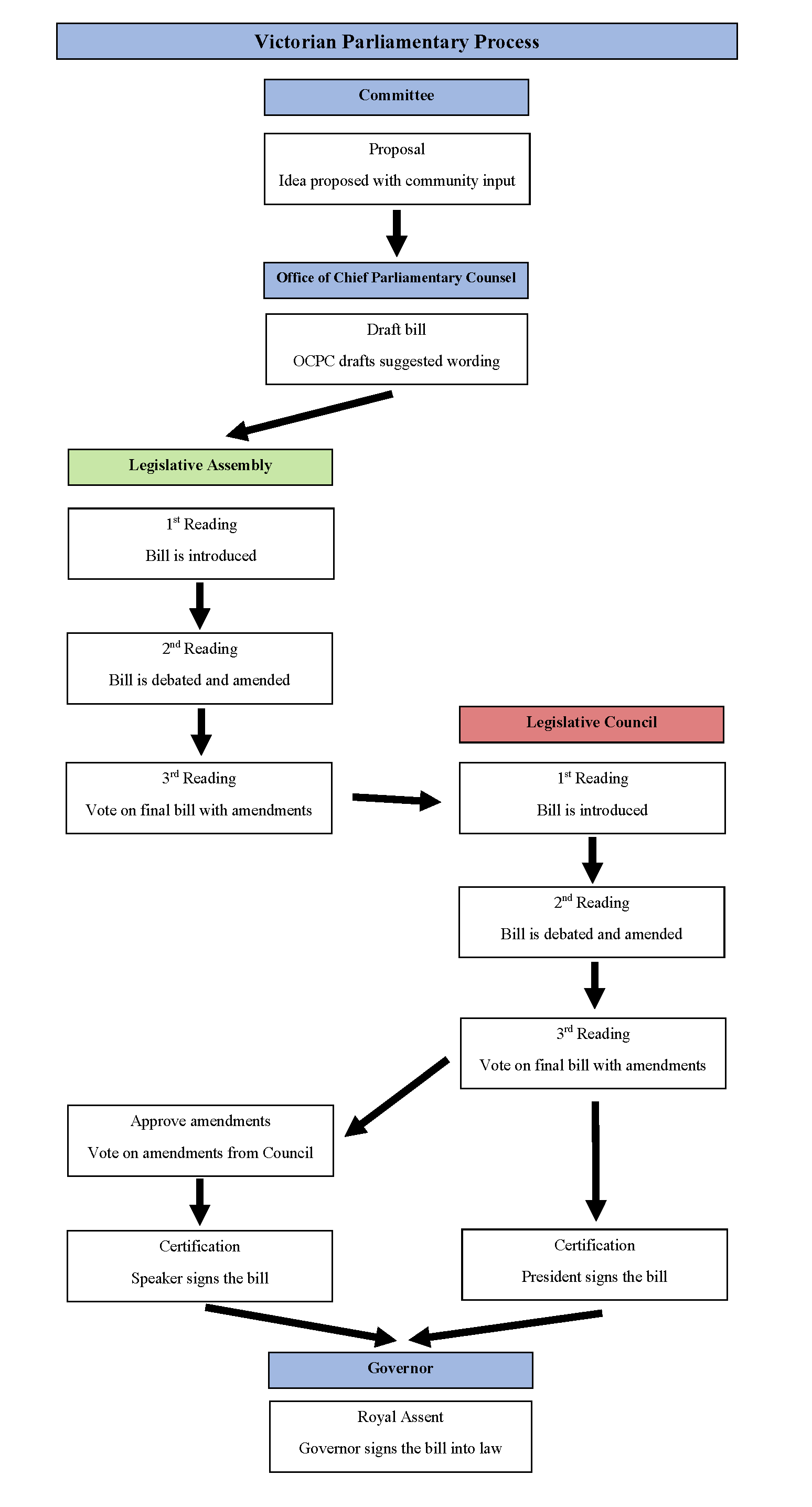
Typical legislative process of the Victorian Parliament

Parliamentary days follow a regular routine. Each sitting day begins with a prayer, and also an acknowledgement to country in respect to Victoria's Indigenous people. A quorum must be present for a day's proceedings to be legally binding, so the presiding officer will generally wait until enough members are within the chamber before entering. Members may only speak in the chamber when given leave to do so by the presiding officer.

A proposed petition, motion or bill can be introduced into either house, but in practice most are introduced into the Legislative Assembly. Any statute bill, with the exception of bills appropriating money for the ordinary annual services of government, must be passed by both Houses before being presented to the governor, who will sign the bill into law on behalf of the King. Ordinary appropriation bills need only be passed by the Legislative Assembly before being presented to the governor for royal assent.

The parliamentary process extends beyond each chamber in turn. Proposed bills and motions will usually be passed separately within their party caucus before they are brought to Parliament. The governing party or parties will also generally only propose bills that have the approval of the relevant minister, and which have already been agreed upon during a cabinet meeting. Cabinet members have large flexibility in drafting bills. They are nonetheless limited by policies that require them to propose bills only within their specific portfolios, and to only allow amendments to existing bills that are relevant to the bill in question. Input is sought from various public groups, private interests and public servants.

=== Committee process ===
As a general rule, official government policy is based on advice given by a committee. This ensures further public input as committees consist of members from many parties. Bills are then drafted by the Office of the Chief Parliamentary Counsel to ensure that all relevant clauses and technicalities in existing laws are covered. Any member, whether in government or otherwise, may draft their own bill. Bills are almost always tabled to Parliament by a minister; any bills proposed by someone other than a Cabinet member are referred to as a private member's bill. Any private member's bill is usually drafted by the member in question without input from the OCPC.

=== Debate and vote ===
The presiding officer of a house determines when a bill, motion or petition is tabled by adding it to the notice paper for a given sitting day. Members must provide notice so that enough time is available to allow for proper debate and scrutiny. The presiding officer will also schedule subsequent readings based on how each house votes; if the bill is passed on its second reading, then it is common to provide for two weeks before the next.

A bill usually goes through three readings once it is tabled in a house. The bill's details remain confidential except to parliament, other than the title, during the first reading to the house from which it originated. Members have a chance to read and analyse the bill at their leisure. It goes to a second reading if the house moves to do so. The Assembly refers to this as Consideration in Detail whereas it is called Committee of the Whole in the council. Debates occur at this stage, as members of the house may scrutinise the bill's merits, propose amendments or move that the bill be dismissed altogether. The bill will be read clause by clause, allowing for all technicalities and edge cases to be discussed. The house will often vote on amendments at this stage as a result of debate and discussion. Any proposed amendments to bills under debate must be relevant. Some bills, such as those that continue routine matters of governance or that do not face opposition, may skip this stage by a unanimous vote. Finally, the house may then go to a third reading, typically two weeks after debate is adjourned following the second reading. The bill is read in full in its final form to ensure that all members can scrutinise the final bill and its amendments (if any). The house's formal vote after the third reading passes the bill in that house and the presiding officer certifies it. This process must occur in both houses for a bill to become law.

Voting in the house can be either be passed by the presiding officer simply asking members to call out their assent by stating, "Aye," or dissent by stating, "No." They then decide which side wins based on the volume. This process of voting "on the voices" is common for matters with little opposition. However, any member may challenge the presiding officer's ruling and ask for a division. This leads to bells being rung and members either stand to the presiding officer's right if they assent or to the left if they dissent. A count is conducted and a record of how each member voted is taken. If a house amends the draft bill, then the other house must separately agree to the same amendments. This means that it is returned to the other chamber for another vote. The bill is usually not read out in full again, rather only the amendment in question.

=== Royal assent ===
Once both houses agree to the bill, and both presiding officers have certified the votes, it is presented to the governor. The governor provides royal assent on behalf of the King, after which the bill with either take effect immediately, or at a time specified in the bill. The governor may not refuse to assent to a bill, except possibly in extreme circumstances where the judiciary and all other constitutional safeguards were unavailable. The governor also has the formal power to return a bill to the houses with suggested amendments, however this is power exercised only on ministerial advice and has only been used to correct minor errors discovered in a bill before it has received assent.

== Functions ==
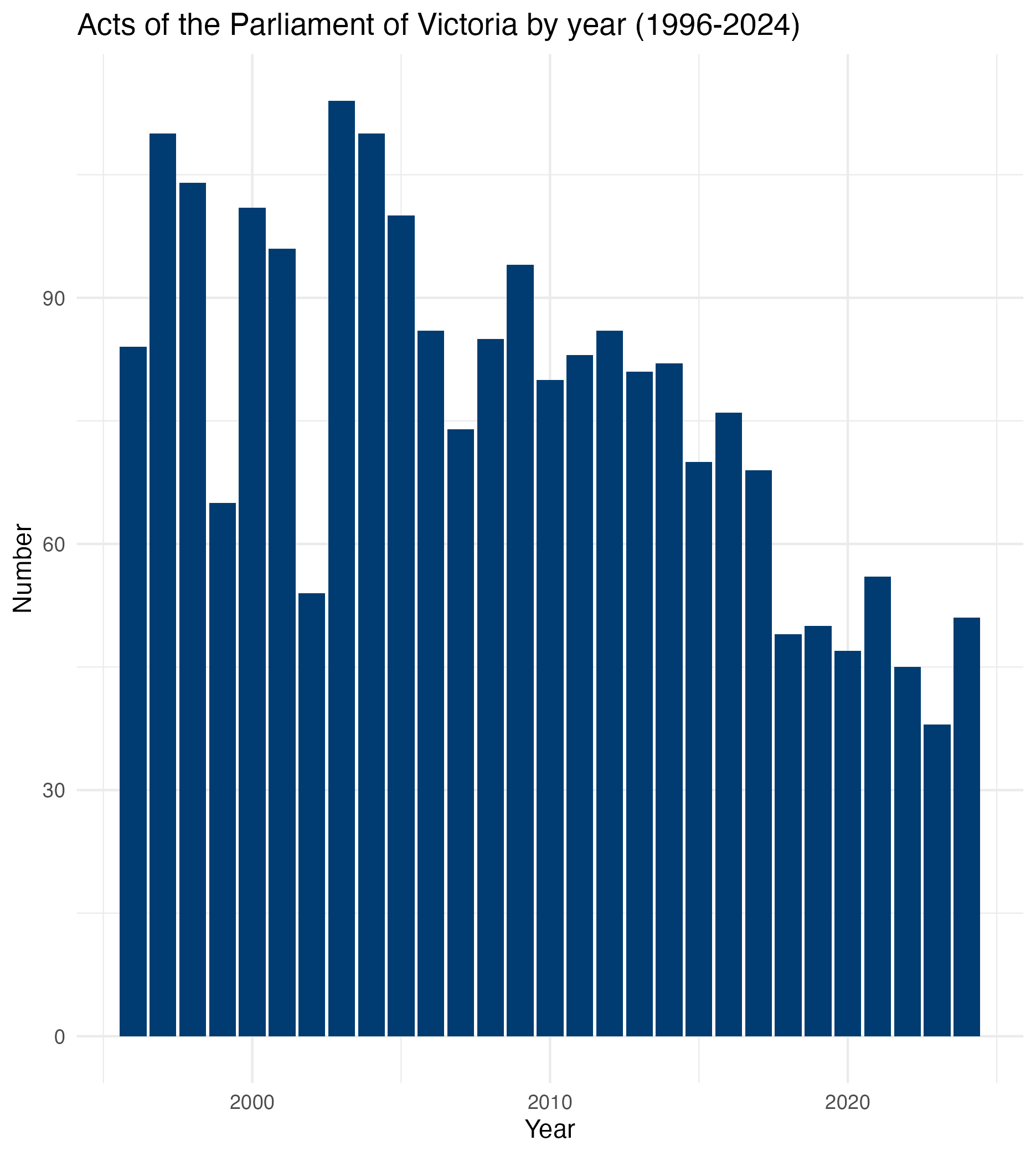
Bar chart showing the number of acts of the Parliament of Victoria by year (1996-2024)

The parliament has the power to make laws for Victoria on any matter, subject only to limitations placed on it by the Constitution of Australia, which specifies which matters fall under the jurisdiction of the Commonwealth. The Commonwealth Constitution identifies three areas of legislative power: exclusive powers, which may only be exercised by the federal parliament, concurrent powers, where may be exercised by both the states or federal parliament, and residual powers which remain the exclusive prerogative of state parliaments. Concurrent powers are limited further, as when a state law and federal law come into conflict, the federal law prevails to the extent of any inconsistency. Exclusive powers deal with matters that affect the entire nation or anything occurring on federal land. For instance, no state may create its own currency, nor raise its own defence force. However, the federal parliament may only make laws for matters to which it has been specifically granted the ability to do so by Australia's Constitution. Therefore, the remaining powers remain the legal domain of each state parliament in turn. The Treasury Corporation of Victoria outlines that the Victorian Parliament's key responsibilities are: "education, public health, police and justice, transport, roads and railways, industry, mining and agriculture, public works, ports, forestry, electricity, gas, and water supply and irrigation".

The parliament may levy its own taxes, however, income taxes have been the exclusive domain of the federal government for decades. The state government's chief means of revenue (outside of grants from the federal government) comes from a combination of payroll taxes, stamp duties on housing and vehicles and a portion of the goods and services tax that is divided amongst all states. The Victorian Government may never levy new taxes, nor spend funds unless it has been specifically authorised to do so by the parliament. It may spend funds raised by taxes from the federal government, although such spending must still be approved by the Victorian Parliament. Victoria has deferred its powers to the federal parliament over time as Australia has concentrated power into its federal government. This is most often done with the practice of "tied grants", whereby the federal government funds projects that are administered at a state level, such as road and rail, but these grants are only given on the condition that the Victorian Parliament also assents to preconditions laid out by its federal counterpart.

The Parliament of Victoria is a bicameral legislature. It usually fulfils its legislative role by first proposing bills in the Legislative Assembly, and then reviewing them in the Legislative Council. Common practice is that the houses sit in staggered dates; the Assembly usually meeting first in order to pass bills that the Council later debates. These houses sit in separate chambers.

The parliament also has the ability to amend Victoria's constitution, although this power is subject to strict requirements. All sections must be passed by an absolute majority of each house (currently 45 in the Assembly and 21 in the council), regardless of how many members are present in the chamber. Alterations to Victoria's Constitution made in 2003 stipulate that some sections may not be modified without a three-fifths majority of both houses, while others may not be amended without a public referendum. However, since neither of these requirements were themselves passed by such majorities it is unlikely that the clauses could not simply be removed by an absolute majority in both chambers at a later date.

Parliament undertakes investigative and research roles. Each house has a number of committees that investigate proposed laws in detail before they are considered by the whole house. They may be formed for research purposes or to seek community input. This function is assisted by the fact that committees include members of more than one political party. Some of the committee work is carried out by the Joint Committees which consist of members from all sides of politics and from both chambers. Like the parliament, the committees cease to exist when the parliament is dissolved by the governor, and need to be recreated after each general election. This means that often the names and jurisdiction of the committees are changed.

The houses provide oversight of the government of the day. Committees may also investigate the effectiveness of existing laws and regulations. Similarly, parliamentary committees may also investigate potential breaches of law or conventions by the government. General practice is that committees are given two weeks to investigate potential impacts on the wider community any bill may have as part of a bill's second reading within a house.

== Conflict between the houses ==
The Victorian Parliament's process of resolving disputes between the two houses is modelled on the Australian Parliament's. However, the process also includes additional steps and modifications. A bill that is passed by the Assembly but rejected by the council, termed a "Disputed Bill" may be amended by the council and returned to the Assembly within 2 months. If the Assembly does not endorse the amendments then a dispute resolution committee may be formed. This process does not apply to ordinary appropriation bills, which need only pass the Legislative Assembly. The committee must consist of 7 members from the Assembly and 5 from the council, each appointed by their respective house. This committee is often formed following an election in anticipation of its usage later. The committee is given 30 days to resolve the dispute in secret and then present their compromise bill to Parliament.

If the committee either cannot reach an agreement, or the parliament does not pass the committee's suggestion, then the bill is termed a "Deadlocked Bill." At this point, the Premier may advise for a fresh election of the Assembly (and only the Assembly), after which the bill may then go before a joint sitting of both houses. A Deadlocked Bill would likely pass a joint sitting, due to the fact that the Assembly is more than twice the size of the council. Such a bill is treated as though it has passed both houses in the normal fashion.

== Relationship with government ==
Parliament functions as the legislative branch of the Victorian level of government. It passes laws or amends existing laws to assist in the governance of the state on behalf the Victorian people, to whom Parliament is answerable through elections. Victoria uses a blend of statutory law and common law. The parliament makes statutory law while common law is decided by the judicial branch of government. The government follows the Westminster tradition of having an executive government whose members come from an elected legislature, a fact that is enshrined in Victorian law.

Parliament holds de facto power over other branches of Victoria's level of government due to its exclusive power to appropriate funds for any government business. This is why holding confidence of supply within the Assembly is crucial to any party's ability to govern; loss of funds could prevent any government business. Parliament's ability to scrutinise government business is assisted by independent arbiters such as the auditor-general and ombudsman. Parliament has specifically legislated for these positions, known as "Officers of Parliament" to act as representatives for the public interest. The powers of these officers are designed so that they may operate independent of interference. The auditor-general, for example, is legislated for in the Audit Act 1994 and oversees the management of public assets and budgetary audits.

=== Governor ===
The monarch (King Charles III) is technically part of Parliament. The monarch's powers are exercised by the governor who is in turn appointed by the King on the advice of the premier. Among the governor's vice-regal duties are the opening of Parliament and the signing of acts that are passed by the Victorian Parliament. The governor retains executive powers over the parliament, such as swearing in ministers, issuing writs for election and dissolving the parliament. The governor generally acts on the advice of the premier and the ministers of government when performing these functions. This following of advice reflects how the governor's role has changed over time from a powerful executive with veto authority to that of an advisory role limited by convention and precedent. However, the parliament is obliged to observe the governor's three rights in overseeing it: the right to be consulted, the right to warn, and the right to encourage. The governor may insist on being consulted on matters before the parliament at any time.

The governor's role includes formally opening sessions of parliament with a speech outlining the government's legislative agenda. Victoria also has a lieutenant-governor to fulfil the functions of the office when the governor is otherwise unavailable.

The governor is not subordinate to the federal governor-general. All Australian state governors have jurisdiction over their respective states with their commissions coming directly from the monarch.

=== Premier and ministry ===
The leader of the political party or coalition with a majority of seats in the Legislative Assembly is invited by the governor to form a government. The leader of that party is appointed premier and other senior members are appointed ministers with various portfolio responsibilities. The premier and the ministers are generally responsible for tabling legislation to the parliament. The premier is, for the most part, the most powerful executive role within the Victorian government. Similarly, the ministers each oversee a specific task related to a chief responsibility of the government. The premier and the ministry separately form the Victorian Government–the executive branch of the Victorian level of government.

The ministers form the cabinet, a group who meets to discuss and decide the direction of the government. Their specific roles and responsibilities are determined by their party caucuses. There are currently twenty-two ministers within the cabinet. Some responsibilities are delegated to fourteen parliamentary secretaries, who act as junior ministers and usually do not sit in cabinet meetings. The ministers are also referred to as "the front bench" as they sit on the benches at the front of each legislative chamber.

The premier and the ministers must be sitting members of parliament. There is no legal requirement that any of the executive government come from any particular house. However, since the Legislative Assembly must provide confidence and supply to the government of the day, the premier is, by convention, a member of the Legislative Assembly.

=== Parties ===
Political parties form a central part of the parliamentary system. The government is opposed by an official opposition. The leader of the largest party in opposition becomes the leader of the Opposition. The opposition plays a central role in debating government ideas as well as scrutinising the government's business and its agenda. However, the opposition's power is limited while the government commands a majority in the Legislative Assembly due to the traditionally strong party discipline throughout Australia. Parties must have at least 500 members on the Victorian electoral roll, have a party constitution and register with the Victorian Electoral Commission to receive official status.

The Labor Party has been in government since 4 December 2014, led by the premier and leader of the Labor Party in Victoria, Jacinta Allan.

The leader of the Opposition is Jess Wilson, who was elected as the leader of the Liberal Party on the 18th of November 2025. The Greens, the third biggest party in parliament, are led by Ellen Sandell; Sandell was elected leader on the 23rd of April 2024.

== Parliamentary sovereignty ==
The sovereign authority of parliament in Australia exists because of three key factors that include constitutional provisions and dual federalism and monarchy. The Parliament of Victoria exercises its power within Commonwealth constitutional boundaries and receives and authorizations from the Crown. The Commonwealth Parliament has completed legislative authority in defined areas yet state legislation comes second to federal law when both governments exercise concurrent powers. Parliament of Victoria exercises sovereign authority within its jurisdiction after the Government affirms decisions and the Governor's power descends from the Monarch. The constitutional system of Victoria differs from the Commonwealth Constitution because it grant Parliament the power to direct both the executive branch and judicial system.

After the Charter of Human Rights and Responsibilities Act 2006 passed the government needed to address concerns about its impact on parliamentary supreme powers. Judicial authorities were given the power to evaluate human rights abuse yet the judicial functions purely through legal interpretation without the power to repeal acts passed by the Parliament. The powers of the legislature can be modified or canceled by Parliament thereby maintaining its control over legislation. According to the Charter the power of future Parliaments remains free to alter or eliminate legislation passed by previous Parliaments.

The Victorian Constitution underwent amendments in 2003 that established requirements for public voting on electoral system adjustments as well as public official independence modifications. Legal experts believe the previsions for constitutional change lack enforcement power because the doctrine of parliamentary supremacy enables legislative modifications through basic parliamentary majorities.

State policies remain subject to federal government regulation because funding depends on specific program conditions. The practice affects state-level decision making without binding Victoria's Parliament because it cannot legally enforce the acceptance of such funding requests. Form a financial standpoint Victoria relies on federal funding yet it continues to retain full power in lawmaking.

== Salary and allowances ==
Members of both the Legislative Assembly and Legislative Council are paid a base salary of $182,413 per annum (as of 1 July 2019). In June 2020, the Victorian Independent Remuneration Tribunal announced Victorian MPs would receive no increase in salaries for the financial year 2020–21.

Office holders such as the president, speaker, ministers and party leaders receive additional salary on top of the base salary. The premier is paid an additional 100 percent of the base salary; the leader of the Opposition and government ministers an additional 75 percent; the president and speaker an additional 65 percent.

Members are also entitled to receive various allowances for travel and work costs. Members representing non-Melbourne electorates are also entitled to a second home allowance.

Prior to 1870 only ministers and office holders were provided with a salary. This in effect meant that members had to be wealthy enough to support themselves before seeking election to Parliament. In 1870 the Victorian Parliament provided for the reimbursing of members in relation to their expenses in attending Parliament, in effect the first salary for members of the Victorian Parliament. At first passed as temporary measure, it later became permanent. The act provided for a payment of £300 p.a. to those who did not already receive a salary. This value is difficult to place in a modern context, due to Australia's conversion to a decimal currency and the smaller economy of the time. This salary would equate to approximately $35,000 in 2018 dollars based on inflation, but could be as much as approximately $340,000 when measuring it as a relative income of the time.

== Current Parliament ==
=== 2022 Election ===
Victorian state election, 26 November 2022 Legislative Assembly << 2018–2026 >>
Enrolled voters	4,394,465				
Votes cast	3,868,615		Turnout	88.03	−2.13
Informal votes	214,410		Informal	5.54	–0.29
Summary of votes by party
Party	Primary votes	%	Swing	Seats	Change
Labor	1,339,496	36.66	–6.20	56	+1
Liberal	1,087,413	29.76	−0.67	19	–2
Greens	420,201	11.50	+0.79	4	+1
National	172,687	4.73	−0.04	9	+3
Family First	111,478	3.05	+3.05	0	±0
Animal Justice	91,646	2.51	+0.69	0	±0
Freedom	64,066	1.75	+1.75	0	±0
Victorian Socialists	48,865	1.34	+0.90	0	±0
Democratic Labour	45,026	1.23	+0.54	0	±0
Liberal Democrats	14,116	0.39	+0.27	0	±0
Shooters, Fishers, Farmers	11,588	0.32	–0.37	0	±0
Reason	10,907	0.30	–0.06	0	±0
One Nation	10,323	0.28	+0.28	0	±0
Justice	7,927	0.22	–0.04	0	±0
Legalise Cannabis	5,838	0.16	+0.16	0	±0
New Democrats	4,874	0.13	+0.13	0	±0
Angry Victorians	3,037	0.08	+0.08	0	±0
Health Australia	862	0.02	+0.02	0	±0
Transport Matters	605	0.02	–0.27	0	±0
Companions and Pets	526	0.01	+0.01	0	±0
Independent	202,724	5.55	–0.52	0	–3
Total	3,654,205			88	
Two-party-preferred
Labor	1,989,350	55.00	–2.30		
Liberal/National	1,627,650	45.00	+2.30		

Victorian state election, 26 November 2022 Legislative Council << 2018–2026 >>
Enrolled voters	4,394,465				
Votes cast	3,877,132		Turnout	88.23	−1.90
Informal votes	124,726		Informal	3.22	–0.74
Summary of votes by party
Party	Primary votes	%	Swing	Seats	Change
Labor	1,238,710	33.01	–6.21	15	–3
Liberal (metropolitan)	636,485	16.96	–0.19	8	+1
Liberal/National	468,289	12.48	+0.21	6	+2
Greens	387,190	10.32	+1.07	4	+3
Legalise Cannabis	153,347	4.09	+4.09	2	+2
Democratic Labour	131,600	3.51	+1.41	1	+1
Liberal Democrats	99,054	2.64	+0.14	1	–1
Shooters, Fishers, Farmers	76,742	2.05	–0.98	1	±0
One Nation	76,734	2.04	+2.04	1	+1
Family First	75,283	2.01	+2.01	0	±0
Justice	57,381	1.53	–2.22	0	–3
Animal Justice	56,819	1.51	–0.96	1	±0
Victorian Socialists	52,245	1.39	+0.48	0	±0
Reason	47,070	1.25	–0.11	0	–1
Freedom	39,910	1.06	+1.06	0	±0
Sack Dan Andrews	31,262	0.83	+0.83	0	±0
United Australia	31,043	0.83	+0.83	0	±0
Health Australia	21,694	0.58	–0.21	0	±0
Sustainable Australia	17,537	0.47	–0.36	0	±0
Companions and Pets	16,464	0.44	+0.44	0	±0
Angry Victorians	14,896	0.40	+0.40	0	±0
Transport Matters	10,605	0.28	–0.33	0	–1
New Democrats	7,743	0.21	+0.21	0	±0
Independent	4,303	0.11	+0.04	0	±0
Total	3,752,406			40	

== See also ==
- Lists of acts of the Parliament of Victoria
- List of Victorian Legislative Council appointments
- 2022 Victorian state election
- First Peoples' Assembly
- Victoria State Government
- List of official openings by Elizabeth II in Australia
- Parliament railway station
- Parliaments of the Australian states and territories
- List of longest-serving members of the Parliament of Victoria
