= Daniel Young (politician) =

Australian politician (born 1988)

Member of the Victorian Legislative Council for Northern Victoria Region
- In office 29 November 2014 – 24 November 2018

Personal details
- Born: Daniel James Young; 4 October 1988 (age 37)
- Other political affiliations: Shooters, Fishers and Farmers (until 2019)
- Occupation: Metalworker
- Website: http://danielyoungmp.com.au/

Daniel James Young (born 4 October 1988) is an Australian politician. He was a Shooters, Fishers and Farmers Party member of the Victorian Legislative Council, representing the Northern Victoria Region from 2014 to 2018.

Following his parliamentary defeat, Young was expelled from the Shooters, Fishers and Farmers Party in February 2019. He was reported to have had a falling out with the state committee over several issues, including his willingness to release confidential party business to the media, and an electoral funding bill Young had personally opposed but voted for due to party solidarity. In addition, Young had disagreed with his party's preference deals for the 2018 election, which he believed undermined his re-election chances in favour of successful Liberal Democrat candidate Tim Quilty.
