= Marg Lewis =

Australian politician

Margaret Lewis

Member of the Victorian Legislative Council
- In office 11 June 2014 – 29 November 2014
- Preceded by: Candy Broad
- Constituency: Northern Victoria Region

Personal details
- Party: Labor Party

Margaret Lewis is an Australian politician. She was a Labor member of the Victorian Legislative Council for Northern Victoria at 11 June 2014, she was appointed to a casual vacancy caused by the resignation of Candy Broad.

Lewis did not re-contest the 2014 Victorian state election.
