= Tania Maxwell =

Australian politician

Tania Maxwell MLC

Member of the Victorian Legislative Council for Northern Victoria Region
- In office 24 November 2018 – 26 November 2022
- Preceded by: Damian Drum
- Succeeded by: Georgie Purcell

Personal details
- Born: Finley, New South Wales, Australia
- Party: Derryn Hinch's Justice Party (until 2023)
- Occupation: Youth worker

Tania Maree Maxwell is a former Australian politician. She was a Derryn Hinch's Justice Party member of the Victorian Legislative Council between 2018 and 2022, representing Northern Victoria Region. She was not re-elected at the 2022 state election.

Maxwell was born and raised in Finley, New South Wales, before moving to Perth to work in Western Australia's mining sector in 1988. She then moved to Wangaratta, Victoria, where she became a youth worker and studied mental health.

Maxwell in 2020 successfully put a motion in Victoria's Parliament to establish an inquiry into Victoria's criminal justice system by the Legislative Council Legal and Social Issues Committee, of which she had been a member since 2019. The inquiry's first hearing was held in Wangaratta. The committee reported on March 24, 2021, making 100 recommendations to reform the state's criminal justice system.

Ahead of the 2022 state election, Maxwell stated she was not privy to preference deals negotiated and agreed to by her party, and encouraged people to vote below the line.

Maxwell is married to Jarrod Toomer.
