= Steve Herbert =

Australian politician

The Honourable Steve Herbert

Member of the Victorian Legislative Council for Northern Victoria
- In office 29 November 2014 – 6 April 2017
- Succeeded by: Mark Gepp

Member of the Victorian Legislative Assembly for Eltham
- In office 30 November 2002 – 4 November 2014
- Preceded by: Wayne Phillips
- Succeeded by: Vicki Ward

Personal details
- Born: Steven Ralph Herbert; 30 April 1954 (age 72) Melbourne
- Party: Labor Party
- Children: Two
- Education: Swinburne University of Technology
- Website: steveherbertmp.com.au

Steven Ralph Herbert (born 30 April 1954) is a former Australian politician. He was a Labor Party member of the Parliament of Victoria from 2002 to 2017: in the Victorian Legislative Assembly as member for Eltham from 2002 to 2014, and in the Victorian Legislative Council for Northern Victoria Region from 2014 to 2017.

Until he resigned in October 2016 for using taxpayer money to chauffeur his dogs on several occasions, Steve Herbert was the Victorian Minister for Training and Skills.

== Education and employment ==
Herbert was born in Melbourne, and attended Glenroy Technical School (1965–70), received a Diploma of Arts in 1975 from Swinburne University of Technology, and a Diploma of Education in 1977 from Melbourne State Teachers College.

Living in Melbourne's northern suburbs most of his life, Herbert taught at several schools including at his alma mater, Glenroy Tech. He was subsequently a state organiser for the Labor Party and a senior electorate officer to Senator Kim Carr. From 1999 to 2002, he was chief of staff to Lynne Kosky, the then Victorian Minister for Education and Training and Minister for Finance.

== Parliamentary career ==
Steve Herbert was preselected as the Labor candidate for the Liberal-held seat of Eltham prior to the 2002 state election, and defeated sitting member Wayne Phillips in Labor's landslide election victory.

Following his election to Victoria's Legislative Assembly, Herbert became the inaugural chair of the all-party Parliamentary Education and Skills Committee, and oversaw the production of a number of reports to Parliament including an investigation into unmet demand for places in higher education institutions on Victoria; the suitability of current pre-service teacher training courses in Victoria; the promotion of maths and science education; and the effects of television and multimedia on education. During this term, he also served on the Legislative Assembly's Privileges Committee, and he continued to serve on the Education and Training committee throughout the 56th Parliament between 2006 and 2010.

Herbert was re-elected in 2006, achieving a swing to him and increasing his margin to 6.4 percent.

Herbert was appointed as Parliamentary Secretary for the Environment, assisting the then Deputy Premier John Thwaites. When John Brumby assumed the Premiership in mid-2007, he became Parliamentary Secretary for Education, assisting then Education Minister Bronwyn Pike.

Herbert narrowly retained his seat of Eltham on a margin of 0.8 percent in the 2010 Victorian election.

Subsequent to the defeat of the Brumby Labor Government, he joined Shadow Cabinet, becoming the Shadow Minister for Higher Education and Skills and Shadow Minister for the Teaching Profession.

In December 2013, Herbert announced he would retire from his seat of Eltham at the 2014 Victorian election and instead seek election to the Victorian Legislative Council in the Northern Victoria Region.

In October 2016, Herbert apologised for using his ministerial chauffeur on several occasions to drive his two dogs over 100 km between his Melbourne residence and his country house. On 9 November, Herbert resigned from the Andrews Ministry and was replaced in his portfolios by Gayle Tierney. He announced his resignation from parliament on 23 March 2017, saying that he "no longer [had] 100 per cent to give".

Parliament of Victoria
Preceded by Wayne Phillips	Member for Eltham; 2002–2014	Succeeded by Vicki Ward
Political offices
Preceded by Nick Wakeling as Minister for Higher Education and Skills	Minister for Training and Skills; 2014–2016	Succeeded by Gayle Tierney
Preceded by Wade Noonan	Minister for Corrections; 2016	Succeeded by Gayle Tierney
New ministerial post	Minister for International Education; 2014–2016	Ministry abolished
