= Northern Victoria Region =

Electoral region of the Victorian Legislative Council

Northern Victoria Region Victoria—Legislative Council
- Interactive map of electoral region boundaries from the 2022 state election, along with its composition of electoral districts
- State: Victoria
- Created: 2006
- MP: Gaelle Broad (Nationals); Wendy Lovell (Liberal); Georgie Purcell (Animal Justice); Jaclyn Symes (Labor); Rikkie-Lee Tyrrell (One Nation)
- Party: Animal Justice (1); Labor (1); Liberal (1); Nationals (1); One Nation (1)
- Electors: 542,768 (2022)
- Area: 102,170 km^{2} (39,448.1 sq mi)
- Demographic: Rural
- Coordinates: 35°57′S 144°36′E

Northern Victoria Region is one of the eight electoral regions of Victoria, Australia, which elects five members to the Victorian Legislative Council (also referred to as the upper house) by proportional representation. The region was created in 2006 following the 2005 reform of the Victorian Legislative Council.

The region comprises the Legislative Assembly districts of Benambra, Bendigo East, Bendigo West, Eildon, Euroa, Macedon, Mildura, Murray Plains, Ovens Valley, Shepparton and Yan Yean.

== Members ==
Members for Northern Victoria Region
Year	Member	Party	Member	Party	Member	Party	Member	Party	Member	Party
2006	Kaye Darveniza	Labor	Candy Broad	Labor	Donna Petrovich	Liberal	Wendy Lovell	Liberal	Damian Drum	Nationals
2010	Kaye Darveniza	Labor	Candy Broad	Labor	Donna Petrovich	Liberal	Wendy Lovell	Liberal	Damian Drum	Nationals
2013	Kaye Darveniza	Labor	Candy Broad	Labor	Amanda Millar	Liberal	Wendy Lovell	Liberal	Damian Drum	Nationals
2014	Kaye Darveniza	Labor	Marg Lewis	Labor	Amanda Millar	Liberal	Wendy Lovell	Liberal	Damian Drum	Nationals
2014	Jaclyn Symes	Labor	Steve Herbert	Labor	Daniel Young	Shooters, Fishers, Farmers	Wendy Lovell	Liberal	Damian Drum	Nationals
2016	Jaclyn Symes	Labor	Steve Herbert	Labor	Daniel Young	Shooters, Fishers, Farmers	Wendy Lovell	Liberal	Luke O'Sullivan	Nationals
2017	Jaclyn Symes	Labor	Mark Gepp	Labor	Daniel Young	Shooters, Fishers, Farmers	Wendy Lovell	Liberal	Luke O'Sullivan	Nationals
2018	Jaclyn Symes	Labor	Mark Gepp	Labor	Tania Maxwell	Justice	Wendy Lovell	Liberal	Tim Quilty	Liberal Democrats
2022	Jaclyn Symes	Labor	Georgie Purcell	Animal Justice	Rikkie-Lee Tyrrell	One Nation	Wendy Lovell	Liberal	Gaelle Broad	Nationals

== Returned MLCs by seat ==
Seats are allocated by single transferable vote using group voting tickets. Changes in party membership between elections have been omitted for simplicity.

Election	1st MLC	2nd MLC	3rd MLC	4th MLC	5th MLC
2006	Labor (Candy Broad)	Liberal (Wendy Lovell)	Nationals (Damian Drum)	Liberal (Donna Petrovich)	Labor (Kaye Darveniza)
2010	Liberal (Wendy Lovell)	Labor (Candy Broad)	Nationals (Damian Drum)	Labor (Kaye Darveniza)	Liberal (Donna Petrovich)
2014	Liberal (Wendy Lovell)	Labor (Steve Herbert)	Nationals (Damian Drum)	SFF (Daniel Young)	Labor (Jaclyn Symes)
2018	Labor (Mark Gepp)	Liberal (Wendy Lovell)	Liberal Democrats (Tim Quilty)	Justice (Tania Maxwell)	Labor (Jaclyn Symes)
2022	Liberal (Wendy Lovell)	Labor (Jaclyn Symes)	Nationals (Gaelle Broad)	Animal Justice (Georgie Purcell)	One Nation (Rikkie-Lee Tyrrell)

== Election results ==
Labor were defending two seats. The Liberal/National coalition, Derryn Hinch's Justice Party, and the Liberal Democrats were defending one seat each.

2022 Victorian state election: Northern Victoria
Party	Candidate	Votes	%	±%
Quota		77,465		
Liberal/National Coalition	1. Wendy Lovell (elected 1); 2. Gaelle Broad (elected 3); 3. Amanda Millar; 4. Liz Fisher; 5. Jillian Merkel	162,860	35.04	+3.84
Labor	1. Jaclyn Symes (elected 2); 2. James McWhinney; 3. Gareth Mills; 4. Rahn Krammaer; 5. Mitch Bridges	134,057	28.84	−2.99
Greens	1. Cate Sinclair; 2. Lenka Thompson; 3. Ralf Thesing; 4. Rosemary Storey; 5. Robin David Chapman	32,399	6.97	+0.40
Shooters, Fishers, Farmers	1. Josh Knight; 2. Peter Watkins	23,715	5.10	−2.75
Legalise Cannabis	1. Adam Miller; 2. Christopher McInally	22,103	4.76	+4.76
One Nation	1. Rikkie-Lee Tyrrell (elected 5); 2. Nadine Edwards-Scott	17,306	3.72	+3.72
Liberal Democrats	1. Tim Quilty; 2. Tim Molesworth	9,249	1.99	−1.79
Justice	1. Tania Maxwell; 2. John Herron	9,140	1.97	−2.89
Family First	1. Michael White; 2. Carol Norton-Smith	7,600	1.64	+1.64
Animal Justice	1. Georgie Purcell (elected 4); 2. Michelle McGoldrick	7,239	1.56	−0.73
Democratic Labour	1. Mark Royal; 2. Ross McPhee	6,842	1.47	+0.02
Freedom	1. Christopher James Alan Neil; 2. Henk N. Wallenborn	4,968	1.07	+1.07
Health Australia	1. Kim Warner; 2. Shaun Moran	4,835	1.04	+0.07
Sack Dan Andrews	1. Yasemin Ceylan; 2. Mukadder Orhan	4,570	0.98	+0.98
Reason	1. Melanie Sharp; 2. Callum Chapman	3,755	0.81	+0.11
United Australia	1. Geoff Shaw; 2. Elijah Suares	3,620	0.78	+0.78
Companions and Pets	1. Laura Barnes; 2. Robert Britton	2,861	0.62	+0.62
Angry Victorians	1. Mark Jones; 2. Melanie Tomlin	2,229	0.48	+0.48
Victorian Socialists	1. Karen Hocking; 2. Emma Dynes	1,893	0.41	+0.12
Sustainable Australia	1. Ian Chivers; 2. Allan Doensen	1,599	0.34	−0.56
Transport Matters	1. Scott Cowie; 2. Neil Cullen	1,368	0.29	−0.13
New Democrats	1. Erin Sharma; 2. Brijesh Chopra; 3. Kuldeep Jitendrakumar Der; 4. Ravinder Singh Rana	576	0.12	+0.12
Total formal votes		464,784	96.93	+0.90
Informal votes		14,734	3.07	−0.90
Turnout		479,518	88.35	−2.40
