= Donna Petrovich =

Australian politician

Member of the Victorian Parliament for Northern Victoria Region
- In office 25 November 2006 – 1 July 2013

Personal details
- Born: 15 November 1963 (age 62) Bendigo, Victoria, Australia
- Party: Liberal Party
- Occupation: Manager, marketing executive

Donna-Lee Petrovich (born 15 November 1963) is an Australian former politician. She was a Liberal Party member of the Victorian Legislative Council from 2006 to 2013, representing Northern Victoria Region. She resigned with a year remaining of her second term in order to contest the 2013 federal election in the seat of McEwen, but was defeated by Labor incumbent Rob Mitchell.

Petrovich was born in Bendigo, Victoria. She commenced her working life at her families' business, Bynon Industries. Some of her community work involved being the marketing executive of the Central Victorian Racing Club and the Hanging Rock Racing Club. She was also very active in the local Liberal Party branches. She won the Hanging Rock Ward in the Macedon Ranges Shire Council 2000 General Election on first preferences of 50.5%. She again won this ward in the 2003 General Election on first preferences of 50.83%. She served the council as deputy and then mayor during this period. She did not contest the 2005 council general election.

Prior to the 2006 Victorian state election, she won preselection for the second position on the Liberal ticket in Northern Victoria, with fellow Liberal Wendy Lovell in the top position. In February 2008, she was appointed Shadow Parliamentary Secretary for Health Services.

She was re-elected in the 2010 election, and was appointed Parliamentary Secretary for Sustainability and the Environment in the new coalition government. She was also a Member of the Law Reform Committee.

Petrovich resigned from the Victorian Legislative Council on 1 July 2013 to contest the Federal electorate of McEwen. She was defeated by incumbent Labor MP Rob Mitchell by 313 votes, the closest result of that election.

At the 2014 Victorian state election, Petrovitch contested the Victorian Legislative Assembly seat of Macedon for the Liberal Party, but was defeated by Labor candidate Mary-Anne Thomas.

Petrovich unsuccessfully nominated for the Liberal Party preselection contest for the South West Coast seat vacated by former premier Denis Napthine.
