= Gaelle Broad =

Australian politician

Gaelle Broad MLC
- Broad in 2026

Member of the Victorian Legislative Council for Northern Victoria Region
- Incumbent
- Assumed office 26 November 2022

Personal details
- Party: The Nationals
- Profession: Politician
- Website: www.gaellebroad.com.au

Gaelle Broad is an Australian politician and former banker, who is a Nationals member of the Victorian Legislative Council representing the Northern Victoria Region, elected at the 2022 Victorian state election. She was previously a Nationals candidate for the district of Bendigo East in the 2018 election, receiving 16% of the primary vote.
