= Mark Gepp =

Australian politician

Mark Gepp MLC

Member of the Victorian Legislative Council for Northern Victoria Region
- In office 7 June 2017 – 26 November 2022
- Preceded by: Steve Herbert

Personal details
- Party: Labor Party
- Education: Deakin University
- Website: www.markgepp.com.au

Mark Gepp is a former Australian politician. He was a Labor member of the Victorian Legislative Council for Northern Victoria since June 2017, when he was appointed to a casual vacancy following Steve Herbert's resignation. He retired at the 2022 state election.

Gepp worked for the Financial Sector Union before becoming an emergency services advisor to then-state minister Jane Garrett before his preselection.

Gepp completed a Graduate Certificate at Deakin University in 2009.
