= Luke O'Sullivan (politician) =

Australian politician (born 1971/72)

Member of the Victorian Legislative Council for Northern Victoria Region
- In office 13 October 2016 – 24 November 2018
- Preceded by: Damian Drum

Personal details
- Born: 1971 or 1972 (age 53–54) Patchewollock, Victoria, Australia
- Party: National Party

Luke O'Sullivan is a former Australian politician. He was a Nationals member of the Victorian Legislative Council for Northern Victoria from 2016, when he was appointed to a casual vacancy following Damian Drum's resignation, until 2018, when he was defeated.

== Political career ==
O'Sullivan is a career politician and political staffer who started his career as an adviser to former Nationals Senator Julian McGauran and who later served as state director of the National Party from 2005 to 2010. He was also briefly employed as a lobbyist for the alcohol and gambling industries.

At the time of his preselection was chief of staff to state Nationals leader Peter Walsh. Walsh chastised O'Sullivan for residing in Melbourne at the time he ran for pre-selection, but O'Sullivan promised to relocate to Northern Victoria if he were successful. O'Sullivan succeeded at his second pre-selection attempt, having been defeated by Bridget McKenzie for Senate pre-selection in 2009. O'Sullivan's appointment was delayed after the Victorian Government refused a joint sitting to appoint him in retaliation for the Legislative Council's vote to suspend Special Minister of State Gavin Jennings from the chamber for six months.

In Parliament, O'Sullivan notably voted against the legalisation of euthanasia and the introduction of a treaty between Victoria and the indigenous community.

Prior to the 2018 state election, O'Sullivan observed that there was a lack of high calibre candidates nominating for regional seats. Despite facing what he had labelled low-calibre opposition, O'Sullivan failed to win election and consequently left the Nationals without upper house representation from Northern Victoria for the first time in the party's history.

After his failure to win election, O'Sullivan was hired by Deputy Prime Minister Michael McCormack as a senior adviser based in Canberra.
