= Amanda Millar =

Australian politician

Member of the Victorian Legislative Council for Northern Victoria Region
- In office 22 August 2013 – 29 November 2014

Personal details
- Born: 1967 (age 58–59)
- Party: Liberal Party
- Education: University of Melbourne

Amanda Louise Millar (born 1967) is an Australian politician.

She studied at the University of Melbourne, where she received a Bachelor of Arts (1988), a Bachelor of Commerce (1989) and a Graduate Diploma in Human Resources and Industrial Relations (1998). She worked as a manager at Jones Lang LaSalle from 1991 to 2003 before becoming Human Resources Consultant at Melbourne University, moving to the Centre of Expertise in 2010. From 2012 to 2013 she was Principal Adviser in Human Resources at Melbourne School of Engineering. On 22 August 2013 she was appointed to the Victorian Legislative Council as a Liberal member for Northern Victoria, following the resignation of Donna Petrovich to contest the federal House of Representatives seat of McEwen.
