= Tim Quilty =

Australian politician

- Quilty in 2026

Member of the Victorian Legislative Council for Northern Victoria Region
- In office 24 November 2018 – 26 November 2022

Councillor of the City of Wodonga
- In office 22 October 2016 – 12 December 2018

Personal details
- Party: Libertarian
- Other political affiliations: Outdoor Recreation (before 2007)
- Spouse: Olga Quilty (m. 2005)
- Children: 2
- Occupation: Farmer, accountant
- Website: www.timquilty.com.au

Timothy Jamin Quilty is an Australian politician. He was a Liberal Democratic Party (LDP) member of the Victorian Legislative Council between 2018 and 2022, representing Northern Victoria Region. He was not successful in his re-election to the Legislative Council in the 2022 state election.

Before his election to parliament, he served as a councillor on the City of Wodonga, previously contesting the Division of Indi for the LDP in the 2016 Australian federal election, as well as the seats of Eden-Monaro in 2007 and Riverina in 2010. He had previously contested Eden-Monaro as a member of the Outdoor Recreation Party in 2004. Prior to entering politics, Quilty was a farmer and an accountant.

Quilty's inaugural speech on 19 February 2019, gained attention for advocating a "Rexit" (regional exit), proposing that rural areas of Victoria and New South Wales separate from urban-dominated governments to form a new state, arguing that city-based policies disadvantaged regional communities. He later released maps in 2021 outlining a proposed "super state" combining regional parts of Victoria, New South Wales, and potentially Queensland.

In parliament, Quilty held several committee roles:

- Member of the Electoral Matters Committee (July 2019–November 2022).
- Participating member of the Legislative Council Legal and Social Issues Committee (June 2019–November 2022).
- Participating member of the Legislative Council * Environment and Planning Committee (June 2019–November 2022).
- Member of the Legislative Council Economy and Infrastructure Committee (April 2019–November 2022).

Other notable positions and actions during his tenure include:

- Opposing extensions of lockdown powers during the COVID-19 pandemic, stating in a 2021 speech, "Let me be entirely clear, I don't trust you with these powers."
- Raising concerns about a privacy breach in legislation allowing access to private medical information in 2022.
- Questioning the disappearance of 60,000 rounds of ammunition from Victoria Police in 2022.
- Supporting animal welfare by backing "Grunt the pig," a local case involving a pet pig facing council restrictions.
- Commenting on defamation laws in Australia, arguing they do not balance reputation rights with free speech.
- Being the only Victorian MP to vote against a 2022 bill banning the public display of Nazi swastikas.
- Voting against the Treaty Authority and Other Treaty Elements Bill 2022 (one of only three MPs to do so), related to Indigenous treaty processes.

Post-parliament, he remains active in libertarian politics, as evidenced by his social media presence where he comments on issues like public transport, youth justice, and regional infrastructure. He identifies with the Libertarian Party (the rebranded LDP) and continues to advocate non-compliance with certain government policies.
