= Candy Broad =

Australian politician

Candy Broad MLC
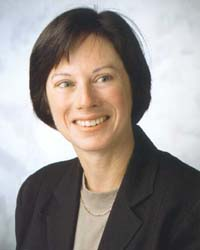

Member of the Victorian Legislative Council
- In office 18 September 1999 – 9 May 2014

Personal details
- Born: 4 January 1956 (age 70) Perth, Western Australia
- Party: Labor Party

Candy Celeste Broad (born 4 January 1956) is an Australian politician. She has been a Labor Party member of the Victorian Legislative Council from September 1999 to May 2014, first representing the electorate of Melbourne North Province until 2006, and then as a Member for the Northern Victoria region.

After making a name for herself as the Assistant National Secretary of the Australian Labor Party (ALP), Broad moved into politics, contesting a safe Labor seat at the 1999 Victorian state election. She was immediately promoted into the ministry and served three years as Minister for Energy and Resources and Minister for Ports. After overseeing a range of changes in this area, she was promoted to Minister for Local Government and Housing after the 2002 election, but was unsuccessful in retaining a frontbench position following the 2006 Victorian State Election.

== Beginnings ==
Broad was born in Perth, Western Australia, and studied commerce at the University of Western Australia. She graduated in 1978 and joined the Australian Labor Party the following year. After moving to Melbourne, Victoria in 1980, she worked as an administrator at the Labor Resource Centre—which specialised in industry and employment-related research—for several years. In 1986, she was appointed as a ministerial adviser, specialising in conservation for three years, before switching to education in 1989.

In 1991, Broad was promoted to Head of the Premier's Office under Joan Kirner. This tenure was to be short-lived, as the Kirner government was defeated the following year, but she re-emerged as the party's Assistant National Secretary in 1993. While in this position, she had considerable influence over the creation of federal ALP policy, and campaigned for the rights of women in the party. To this end, Broad played a significant role in the 1994 introduction of the ALP's affirmative action scheme, aiming to have women pre-selected in 35 percent of winnable seats. She was also heavily involved in the creation in 1996 of Emily's List Australia, the support network for ALP women.

In the months before the 1999 state election, Caroline Hogg, the sitting member for the very safe Labor Legislative Council seat of Melbourne North Province, announced that she would resign only halfway through her term. This meant that a by-election for her seat would be held alongside the regular election, and Broad won Labor pre-selection to fill the vacancy.

== First term (1999–2002) ==
The election saw Broad easily defeat her Liberal rival, and also saw the ALP, under new leader Steve Bracks, regain power after seven years. The widely unexpected victory meant that several first-time MPs were promoted to the ministry, and Broad was appointed Minister for Energy and Resources, Minister for Ports, and Minister Assisting the Minister for State and Regional Development. In this new portfolio, Broad was forced to deal with a number of major issues, particularly those surrounding the state's power supplies and natural resources.

One of Broad's first challenges as an incoming minister was to deal with the fate of the Snowy River, which had diminished to a trickle as a result of being dammed for various purposes. Though it had been an environmental issue for many years, it became of particular concern to the Bracks government, as the issue was central to the support of independent Craig Ingram, who they relied on to retain a majority in parliament. It fell to Broad, as the relevant minister, to handle negotiations on the issue with both the federal and New South Wales state governments. Despite the involvement of a number of conflicting interests, a major agreement was reached between the three parties in October 2000. This saw A$160 million put towards regenerating the river, with the intention of increasing its water flow to 28% of its original capacity.

Broad was also faced with the problem of balancing the need to promote environmentally sustainable sources of energy against the need to maintain a cheap and reliable electricity supply across the state. She publicly supported the Kyoto Protocol, and oversaw the introduction of the Victorian Greenhouse Strategy, which introduced a range of reforms, such as mandated five-star efficiency standards for new houses, and which, according to the government, would save "about five to eight million tonnes of greenhouse gas emissions per year".

Despite this, Broad oversaw the tendering process for the first new brown coal licenses in Victoria in almost a century. This decision allowed for the construction of coal-to-oil facilities capable of emitting several million tons of additional carbon dioxide each year, with associated conditions requiring that they introduce more efficient means of production in order to minimise the environmental costs. However, the tenders led to substantial criticism from several environmental groups, such as Environment Victoria, who argued that it could "wipe out all of the savings" achieved in the Greenhouse Strategy, and pushed for a complete ban on new brown coal facilities.

As the minister responsible for energy, Broad was entrusted with the task of maintaining stable electricity supplies across the state. In this way, she helped to establish the National Electricity Market Ministers Forum, a high-level organisation with the mission of expediting reform in the area. She went on to serve as its founding chair during 2001.

In addition, she oversaw the instigation of two major changes to the state's electricity industry. This involved the establishment of the position of the Essential Services Commissioner, which created a regulatory body that could deal with individual complaints, and the introduction of choice in dealing with retail electricity companies. This encouraged the various electricity companies to compete for customers, replacing a system where each had operated with a monopoly in certain regions. However, Broad was also to face serious difficulties associated with industrial relations in this area, most notably when she was forced to play a mediating role in a long-running and much-publicised dispute between Yallourn Energy, one of the state's major power suppliers, and their workforce.

== Second term (2002–2006) ==
Due to being elected in a by-election, Broad had to face re-election at the November 2002 state election, but was easily re-elected. After the election, Premier Bracks oversaw a major reshuffle of the ministry, and Broad was moved to the higher-profile portfolios of Local Government and Housing, at the expense of Bob Cameron, who was demoted to Agriculture. These new portfolios left Broad responsible for the issues of public housing, homelessness and local councils in general, as well as overseeing the November 2004 council elections.

Broad was responsible for implementing a controversial $70 million proposal to encourage welfare groups and councils to form not-for-profit housing associations as a means of dealing with public housing. Though Broad had not been involved in the plan's conception, as it had been devised by her predecessor as Minister for Housing, she had to deal with the mixed reactions the proposal received. While it was commended by some, such as the Salvation Army, others, such as the Brotherhood of St Laurence worried that it gave them little protection if an association ran into financial trouble.

Under Broad, several public housing estates underwent major renovations - most notably in the notorious Kensington area of Melbourne and in Wendouree West, Ballarat. A number of smaller residential facilities were also built, mostly in regional areas. However, she came under fire from several organisations representing public tenants for agreeing to raise rent charges across the state, as well as to sell off significant open space adjacent to an estate in Port Melbourne.

Broad's tenure as Minister for Housing also included the unveiling of the Youth Homeless Action Plan. This both attempted to determine major causes of homelessness and provided a number of potential means for dealing with the problem, such as family mediation and further attempts at education. It resulted in an influx of $8.8 million into relevant programs, as well as a $298,000 grant to the Melbourne Citymission. In addition, she oversaw the introduction of a $200,000 plan to prevent homeless in the regional area of Loddon Mallee, and opened a series of small accommodation centres for the homeless in both Melbourne and a number of regional centres.

In comparison to the many developments under the housing portfolio, Broad's term as Minister for Local Government has been comparatively uneventful. As the responsible minister for the November 2004 council elections, she came under some fire for not intervening in the City of Melbourne lord mayoral race, which had over 100 candidates vying for two positions, resulting in widespread allegations of dummy candidates. However, she claimed some vindication when the result was widely uncontroversial, seeing the re-election of incumbent Lord Mayor of Melbourne John So.

== Third term (2006–2014) ==
Broad wished to continue as a Minister following Labor's victory on 25 November 2006, however, she did not have enough votes within the Labor Caucus to secure a frontbench position. She went to the backbench in the odd position of never having been a backbencher in her seven-year parliamentary career.

Broad introduced the Abortion Law Reform Bill into the Parliament in 2008, which was passed overwhelmingly on a conscience vote by Members of all parties.

Broad did not contest the 2014 election.

== Personal life ==
Broad is an avid football supporter, and is a member of the Collingwood Football Club. She supports voluntary euthanasia, being a member of the Voluntary Euthanasia Society of Victoria, and is a member of several community organisations, such as the Australian Conservation Foundation.

In 2025 Broad was inducted onto the Victorian Honour Roll of Women.

== Additional References ==
- Parliamentary Handbook. Retrieved 27 November 2004.
- Emily's List Australia biography. Retrieved 27 November 2004.
- The Premier's Office ministerial biography. Retrieved 27 November 2004.
- Adam Carr's Election Archive 1999 and 2002 Legislative Council Results. Retrieved 27 November 2004.
- Edie News Centre (14 June 2002) Australian Government rejects Kyoto, but a state government calls for ratification. Retrieved 27 November 2004.
- Homeless News (April 2004) New-look bid to lift housing. Retrieved 27 November 2004.
- Homeless News (May 2004) $8.8m tackle youth homelessness. Retrieved 27 November 2004.
- Stateline, ABC TV (12 November 2004) Interview with Local Government Minister Candy Broad on Melbourne City Council's voting system. Retrieved 27 November 2004.
