= Georgie Purcell =

Australian politician (born 1992)

Georgie Purcell MLC
- Purcell in 2026

Member of the Victorian Legislative Council for Northern Victoria
- Incumbent
- Assumed office 26 November 2022

Personal details
- Born: 13 July 1992 (age 34) Inverleigh, Victoria, Australia
- Party: Animal Justice
- Domestic partner: Josh Burns (2024–present)
- Children: 1
- Education: Deakin University
- Website: www.georgiepurcell.com.au

Georgina Purcell (born 13 July 1992) is an Australian politician. Elected to the Victorian Legislative Council at the 2022 state election, she represents the Animal Justice Party and is currently the party's sole MP in the Victorian Parliament. During her term as an MP, she has advocated for a number of issues relating to animal welfare. Purcell supports a ban on duck hunting, has named offenders in the greyhound racing industry under parliamentary privilege, and passed a motion for an inquiry into pig welfare. Purcell supports the expansion of regional abortion services, has called for a ceasefire in the Gaza war, and believes in expanding labour rights for sex workers.

== Early life and career ==
Purcell was born and raised in the town of Inverleigh, in southwestern Victoria. She was raised Presbyterian, but is currently irreligious. Purcell is a former lawyer and holds a double degree from Deakin University in law and communications/politics. Amidst her studies at Deakin, Purcell worked as a topless waitress and stripper, which was outed without her consent to her university classmates, which she described as "the most severe of betrayals".

Following completion of her studies, she worked as a digital campaigner at United Voice (now United Workers Union), a communications adviser at Industry Super Australia, and as Chief of Staff to Andy Meddick prior to being elected to the Victorian Parliament. Purcell has also campaigned against horse racing in Australia, and has been involved with the Coalition for the Protection of Racehorses since as early as 2013.

As of 2019, Purcell was the social media coordinator for the Coalition Against Duck Shooting.

Then the president of animal welfare group Oscar's Law, Purcell started a petition in 2021 opposing a proposed puppy farm in the New South Wales town of Moama, stating that the proposed operator of the business had previously employed a man charged with animal cruelty offences, and that stronger regulations were required in New South Wales to address puppy farms. Although the petition received over 38,000 signatures, it was unsuccessful, with Murray River Council approving the puppy farm's development application by a vote of five to four. In the same year, Purcell joined Animal Justice MP Emma Hurst in presenting a petition to the electorate office of Adam Marshall (then New South Wales' Minister for Agriculture) calling for the ban of puppy farms in New South Wales.

== Parliament ==
Purcell was elected fourth of five members for Northern Victoria in the 2022 Victorian state election, representing the Animal Justice Party. Due to the defeat of Meddick in the Western Victoria Region, Purcell became the Animal Justice Party's only MP in Victoria.

Purcell was elected in 2022 with 1.5 percent of the primary vote, the lowest of any successful candidate in the Legislative Council. Electoral analyst Antony Green has stated that Purcell's election owed to the system of group voting tickets, in which most preferences are allocated by political parties. Glenn Druery, a political strategist who orchestrates preference-swapping between minor parties, has stated that he believed the Animal Justice Party would direct their preferences to his clients in exchange for preferences being directed to Purcell in Northern Victoria. However, the Animal Justice Party ultimately directed their preferences to progressive parties, such as Victorian Socialists and the Reason Party, while still being the beneficiary of preferences from Druery's minor party clients. Purcell was not involved in this preferencing decision.

In a June 2022 opinion piece for The Guardian, Purcell wrote that nurses should be permitted to prescribe medical abortions, due to the limited number of general practitioners registered to prescribe medication for abortion and the high cost associated with administering RU486, a medical abortion drug. In Parliament, she has spoken in favour of the expansion of abortion services in rural and regional Victoria.

For International Women's Day in March 2023, Purcell wore a dress to Victoria's Parliament House featuring a number of abusive and misogynistic comments directed to her since her election. She has stated that while comments directed to her are often "particularly vile and misogynistic", online abuse directed towards female politicians was a cross-partisan issue.

Purcell successfully passed a motion in the Legislative Council in May 2023 calling for an inquiry into pig welfare in Victoria. Purcell was motivated to introduce this motion after footage from an abattoir in Benalla, illegally filmed by members of the Farm Transparency Project, was released, which showed pigs being gassed prior to slaughter. The motion received the support of Labor, the Greens, and the Liberal Democrats.

Purcell has raised awareness of animal welfare concerns in the greyhound racing industry. A motion introduced by Purcell in March 2023 to introduce mandatory greyhound tracking passed unanimously, with the Labor government and the Greyhound Racing Victoria (GRV) both supporting the proposal. In August 2023, she organised for Graham, a trafficked greyhound with broken bones and head injuries, to meet Anthony Carbines, the Victorian minister for racing, stating that the dog was "Australia's first trafficked greyhound to meet with the minister". She has described the greyhound racing industry as a "dog-killing machine", and has named offenders in the industry under parliamentary privilege. Purcell was criticised by GRV for this, who argue that she prevented the investigation of these offences and did not provide GRV with information prior to speaking in Parliament. Purcell has responded by stating that she had referred this information to GRV "on a number of occasions".

Purcell has advocated against duck hunting, which is legal in the state of Victoria. Purcell has stated that a key reason she stood for office was to end the practice of duck hunting. After the Allan government allowed duck hunting to continue for the 2024 season, Purcell described the practice as "Victoria's greatest shame". In April 2024, on the first weekend of Victoria's duck-hunting season, Purcell illegally entered a Kerang swamp with the aim of rescuing injured birds. She was subsequently banned from duck hunting wetlands for the 2024 season. Purcell was heavily critical of the Allan government's decision to expand the 2025 duck hunting season, saying it would leave 400,000 native birds vulnerable to "ruthless" killing.

Alongside Emma Hurst, an Animal Justice MP in New South Wales, Purcell visited the United States cities of Los Angeles and Washington, D.C. in September 2023, meeting with the American Society for the Prevention of Cruelty to Animals and the Stray Cat Alliance, in part to discuss proposals on banning kangaroo skin imports and existing bans on greyhound racing in the United States. This trip was claimed on the parliamentary international travel allowance, at a cost of A$4,030.

In January 2024, Purcell criticised Nine News Melbourne for using a digitally altered image of her with "enlarged boobs" and an exposed midriff, which were not present in the original image, citing it as an example of discrimination and "the constant sexualisation and objectification" of women. Nine News Melbourne director Hugh Nailon stated that "the automation by Photoshop created an image that was not consistent with the original", and apologised to Purcell. Adobe refuted the claim that the photo was automatically edited, with a spokesperson saying: "Any changes to this image would have required human intervention and approval".

Purcell was one of the first members of an Australian parliament to call for a ceasefire in the Gaza war, and was described by The Guardian as a "longstanding advocate for Palestine".

On the date of the 2024 Melbourne Cup, Purcell expressed her support for a ban of whipping racehorses and the implementation of a breeding cap on racehorses, and stated her broader opposition to the practice of horse racing.

Purcell has said that she believes in stronger labour rights for sex workers, calling prospective changes to legislation to expand right to work and improve the safety of sex workers "a really good thing", and has praised sex industry labour reforms in Belgium. Purcell has advocated for increased state government funding to Southside Justice, which operates a legal service for sex workers, and Vixen, a peak body organisation for sex workers.

Following concerns raised to her by Deb Tranter, the manager of the Castlemaine General Cemetery, Purcell spoke in Parliament in September 2024, calling for a change in the law to allow pets to be buried alongside humans in public cemeteries. Similar reforms were passed in New South Wales in early 2025. An amendment proposed by Purcell successfully passed the Victorian Legislative Council in October 2025, allowing for animals to be buried in human cemeteries.

After the May 2025 deaths of eight kangaroos at an open water channel in Faraday, in Purcell's electorate of Northern Victoria, Purcell stated that wildlife crossings installed by operator Coliban Water were "clearly not being used", and said that the government had failed to consider the need for urban expansion with the protection of native wildlife.

In a November 2025 parliamentary speech on a bill that would restrict non-disclosure agreements in cases of workplace sexual harassment, Purcell stated that she had been sexually harassed in the workplace, including as a political staffer and as an MP. Purcell stated that she had reported the harassment, but that this resulted in whispers and rumours being spread about her, saying: "the immediate questions were: 'What did she expect? Look how she dresses. Look at the tattoos. Look at her past. You can't sexually harass the stripper.'"

== Personal life ==
Purcell owns a property in Kyneton. On 19 December 2025 she gave birth to her first child with Labor Party MP Josh Burns.

Purcell has publicly discussed her experiences accessing abortion services in Victoria in the context of advocating for expanded reproductive healthcare access. She has spoken about difficulties accessing services and experiencing harassment prior to the introduction of safe access zone legislation preventing protests outside abortion clinics.
