= Wendy Lovell =

Australian politician

The Honourable Wendy Lovell MLC

Minister for Housing
- In office 2 December 2010 – 29 November 2014
- Premier: Denis Napthine
- Preceded by: Richard Wynne
- Succeeded by: Martin Foley

Minister for Children and Early Childhood Development
- In office 2 December 2010 – 29 November 2014
- Premier: Denis Napthine
- Preceded by: Maxine Morand
- Succeeded by: Jenny Mikakos

Member of the Victorian Legislative Council for Northern Victoria Region
- Incumbent
- Assumed office November 2006

Member of the Victorian Legislative Council for North Eastern Province
- In office November 2002 – November 2006

Personal details
- Born: 11 August 1959 (age 67) Sydney, New South Wales
- Party: Liberal Party

Wendy Ann Lovell (born 11 August 1959) is an Australian politician. Born in Sydney, New South Wales, she was a newsagent before becoming involved in politics. She held numerous posts with the Liberal Party, and was eventually elected to the Victorian Legislative Council as a Liberal member for North Eastern Province in 2002. Following the re-organisation of the Legislative Council, in 2006 she was a successful candidate for Northern Victoria Region, winning re-election in 2010, 2014, 2018 and 2022.

Lovell served as Minister for Housing and Minister for Children and Early Childhood Development from 2010 to 2014 in the Ballieu and Napthine governments.

From 2010 to 2014 Lovell served as Manager of Government Business in the Legislative Council and was Deputy Leader of the Liberal Party in the Legislative Council from 2007 to 2014. From 2014 to 2018 Lovell was the Opposition Whip in the Legislative Council. Following the 2018 election Lovell was elected Deputy President of the Legislative Council.

In her early career Ms Lovell also held many Shadow Ministerial portfolios including: Shadow Minister for Women's Affairs December 2002 – February 2008, Shadow Minister for Consumer Affairs May 2006 – August 2007, Shadow Minister for Tourism May 2006 – August 2007, Shadow Minister for Country Victoria December 2006 – December 2010 and Shadow Minister for Housing December 2006 – December 2010.

In March 2022, Lovell made a speech in Parliament arguing public housing should not be built in wealthy areas, stating “There is no point putting a very low income, probably welfare-dependent, family in the best street in Brighton where the children cannot mix with others or go to school with other children or where they do not have the same ability to have the latest sneakers and iPhones.” Lovell's remarks attracted widespread condemnation.

In January 2026, Lovell announced she would retire at the 2026 Victorian state election.

On the first parliamentary sitting day of 2026, Lovell was criticised after appearing to fall asleep during a parliamentary debate.
