= Rikkie-Lee Tyrrell =

Australian politician

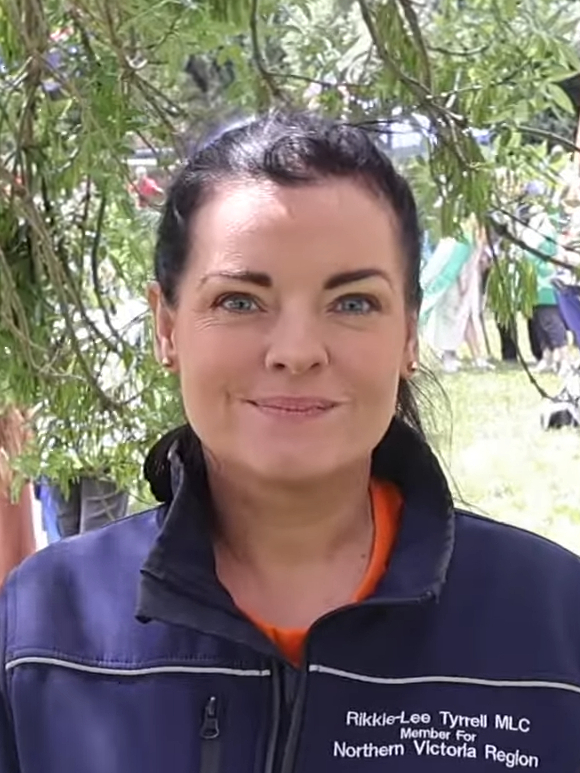
- Tyrrell in 2025

Personal details
- Born: c. 1982 Wagga Wagga, New South Wales, Australia
- Party: One Nation
- Spouse: Aaron Tyrrell

Rikkie-Lee Tyrrell is an Australian politician who is a member of the Victorian Legislative Council for the Northern Victoria Region. She was elected at the 2022 Victorian state election and became the first person representing Pauline Hanson's One Nation in the Victorian parliament.

Tyrrell had previously been the One Nation candidate for the federal seat of Nicholls at the 2019 federal election, finishing third, and again at the 2022 federal election, finishing fifth. Her husband, Aaron Tyrrell was the One Nation candidate for the seat in the 2025 federal election.

Tyrrell was a dairy farmer for 16 years prior to her election to the Legislative Council.

== Political career ==
On 21 February 2023, Tyrrell delivered her maiden speech to the Victorian Legislative Council. In her speech, she emphasised her identity as an Australian and a representative of Northern Victoria, advocating for reduced government regulation, especially around water management for agriculture, and defending her party's net-zero immigration policy as a matter of resource capacity rather than race. She directly addressed and rejected prior accusations of racism made against her by political opponents stating that they were "hasty and ill-informed" and by labelling her as racist they were "failing to properly represent [their] constituents".

In 2025, Tyrrell called on the state government to expand its drought assistance to include all local government areas in Northern Victoria, stating that the existing support was insufficient for the region's farmers.

Tyrrell publicly distanced herself from anti-immigration billboards placed in her electorate by her own party, calling the messaging "unsuitable" for the region. She said she had no prior knowledge of the content of the signs and would not have approved them.

On 15 October 2025, Tyrrell moved a motion in the Legislative Council calling for the criminalisation of desecrating the Australian and Victorian state flags. The motion argued that such acts were aggressive and symbolic of violence, rather than legitimate protest, and referenced public polling data to suggest support for legal penalties. It called on the state government to enact legislation to protect the flags as symbols of national unity and values. Labor MLC Sheena Watt criticised the motion as "a distraction from the real issues facing Victorians" and accused Tyrell of provoking "American-style culture wars" while Greens MLC Sarah Mansfield opposed it as discriminatory and an attack on the right to protest. Libertarian MLC David Limbrick opposed the motion, arguing that while he respected the flag, criminalising its desecration would violate principles of freedom of expression. Liberal MLC Moira Deeming supported the motion, defending the flag as a unifying national symbol, and accusing the government of hypocrisy for not displaying it on official websites, and condemning her opponents' criticisms as divisive and "un-Australian".
