= Restore Democracy Sack Dan Andrews Party =

Australian political party

- Abbreviation: RDSD; Sack Dan Andrews Restore Democracy
- Leader: Tosh-Jake Finnigan
- Founder: Tosh-Jake Finnigan
- Founded: 18 August 2022; 3 years ago
- Registered: 28 October 2022; 3 years ago
- Dissolved: 22 December 2023; 2 years ago
- Ideology: Anti-corruption
- Colac Otway Shire Council: 1 / 7 (2023)

Website
- viclabor.org

The Restore Democracy Sack Dan Andrews Party (RDSD), also known as Sack Dan Andrews Restore Democracy, was an Australian political party founded in 2022 by whistleblower Tosh-Jake Finnigan, over the Labor Party's so-called 'red shirts rorts' scandal. The party was formed in opposition to then-Victorian Premier Daniel Andrews.

== History ==
Restore Democracy Sack Dan Andrews was registered by the Victorian Electoral Commission (VEC) as a political party on 28 October 2022, after applying for registration on 18 August 2022.

On 16 November 2022, Australian Values Party leader Heston Russell leaked a video to the Herald Sun of him talking to Glenn Druery about a potential preference deal. In the video, Druery claims that he controls a number of minor parties and that Restore Democracy Sack Dan Andrews is "one of mine". Finnigan denied the allegations and said Druery had "fuck all involvement" in setting up the party.

At the 2022 Victorian state election, RDSD received 0.83% of the statewide legislative council vote. Finnigan ran in the Western Victoria Region and was unsuccessful at getting elected.

In January 2023, Finnigan was elected via a countback to the Colac Otway Shire Council, becoming the first openly transgender councillor in the history of Victoria.

The party was deregistered in December 2023, three months after Andrews resigned as premier, after it "failed to provide up to date information and documents" to the VEC.
