= Derryn Hinch's Justice Party =

Political party in Australia

- Founder: Derryn Hinch
- Founded: 12 October 2015
- Registered: 14 April 2016
- Dissolved: 2 March 2023
- Headquarters: 14/1 Queens Rd; Melbourne, VIC 3004
- Ideology: Law and order Anti-paedophilia
- Political position: Centre-right to right-wing
- Senate: 1 / 76 (2016–2019)
- Victorian Legislative Council: 2 / 40 (2018–2022)
- Maribyrnong City Council: 1 / 7 (2018)

Website
- justiceparty.com.au

Derryn Hinch's Justice Party, also known as the Justice Party, was a political party in Australia, registered for federal elections since 14 April 2016. The party was named after its founder, Derryn Hinch, an Australian media personality.

The party won a single three-year term in the Senate at the 2016 federal election, after achieving 6.05% of the first-preference votes in Victoria, though lost the seat in 2019. It also was registered by the Victorian Electoral Commission in May 2018 and ran candidates in the 2018 Victorian state election, three of whom were elected. No Justice Party candidates were re-elected at the 2022 Victorian state election.

In March 2023, Hinch announced that the party would be dissolved following poor election results.

== Background ==
Hinch announced his political ambitions in October 2015, and at that stage remained host of his weekly program Hinch Live, in a decision supported by Sky News Live. Hinch stepped down from the program on 24 April 2016, telling viewers the program was entering either "semi or permanent recess" depending on the success of his party. The Justice Party's election platform was anti-paedophile, tough on crime, and in favour of stricter parole and bail conditions.

== Policy platform ==
Focusing on reforms to the justice system, Derryn Hinch's Justice Party believed in a hard-line law-and-order approach. The party campaigned on prioritising jail sentences over rehabilitation and bail, as well as tougher restrictions on parole. Anti-paedophilia formed another large part of the party's ideology, owing to Hinch's background in naming alleged sexual offenders.

Derryn Hinch's Justice Party's advocated for longer sentences for violent crimes and further tightening of bail and parole laws. The party also supported ending the live export trade and establishing a national public register of convicted sex offenders.

According to The Age, between November 2018 and November 2021, the Derryn Hinch's Justice Party's Legislative Council members voted with the Andrews Government's position 53.9% of the time.

== Electoral history ==
=== Federal ===
The Justice Party fielded candidates for the Senate in every state of Australia, and also six lower house seats, in the 2016 federal election. Derryn Hinch was the party's lead candidate to represent Victoria in the Senate. Hinch was successful at securing the 10th seat of the 12 representing Victoria. No other Justice Party candidates were elected. Aged 72, Hinch is the oldest federal parliamentarian to be elected for the first time. Hinch lost his seat in 2019.

Senate
Election year	# of overall votes	% of overall vote	# of seats won	# of overall seats	+/–
2016	266,607	1.93%	1 / 76	1 / 76	▲1
2019	105,459	0.72%	0 / 40	0 / 76	▼1
2022	54,366	0.36%	0 / 40	0 / 76	Steady

=== Victoria ===
The Justice Party fielded 6 lower house candidates with none winning more than 4.5% of their respective district's vote. The party fielded 12 candidates for the Victorian Legislative Council with three being elected: Stuart Grimley, Tania Maxwell and Catherine Cumming. However, on 18 December Western Metropolitan Region member-elect Catherine Cumming was sacked from the party, and was sworn in as an independent. No Justice Party members were re-elected in 2022.

Victorian Legislative Council
Election year	# of overall votes	% of overall vote	# of seats won	+/–
2018	134,413	3.7%	3 / 40	▲3
2022	57,381	1.53%	0 / 40	▼3

== Elected representatives ==
=== Federal ===
==== Senate ====
- Derryn Hinch (2016–2019)

=== Victoria ===
==== Victorian Legislative Council ====
- Stuart Grimley (2018–2022)
- Tania Maxwell (2018–2022)

==== Maribyrnong City Council ====
- Catherine Cumming (2018)
