= Electoral regions of Victoria =

Electoral divisions of the Victorian Legislative Council

Electoral districts of the Victorian Legislative Assembly for the 2022 and 2026 state elections, with districts in the same electoral region sharing the same colour

The eight regions of the Legislative Council.

Members of the Victorian Legislative Council, the upper house of the Parliament of the Australian State of Victoria, are elected from eight multi-member electorates called regions. The Legislative Council has 40 members, five from each of the eight regions.

The boundaries of the electoral regions were last drawn in 2021.

== Reform of 2003 ==
A major reform of the Parliament was made by the Labor government, led by Steve Bracks, by the Constitution (Parliamentary Reform) Act 2003. Under the new system, members of the Legislative Council serve terms linked to elections for the Legislative Assembly, which are fixed four-year terms, unless dissolved sooner.

Each electoral region consists of 11 contiguous Legislative Assembly electoral districts with about 420,000 electors each. Each region elects five members to the Legislative Council by a single transferable vote. There are currently 40 members of the Legislative Council, four fewer than previously. The changes also introduced proportional representation, making it easier for minor parties to gain seats in the Legislative Council. With each region electing 5 members, the quota for a seat in each region, after distribution of preferences, is 16.7% (one-sixth). At the same time, the Council's ability to block supply was removed.

The Electoral Boundaries Commission drew the boundaries of the new regions in 2005. The new system came into effect for the 2006 Victorian election.

== Current regions ==
Victoria is divided into eight electoral regions, 3 rural and 5 metropolitan:

- Eastern Victoria Region
- North-Eastern Metropolitan Region
- Northern Metropolitan Region
- Northern Victoria Region
- South-Eastern Metropolitan Region
- Southern Metropolitan Region
- Western Metropolitan Region
- Western Victoria Region

The boundaries of the electoral regions were last drawn in 2021 in unison with the redistricting of electorates. Prior to the 2022 state election, the Eastern Metropolitan Region was renamed the North-Eastern Metropolitan region.

== Provinces 1856 to 2006 ==
The Legislative Council was formerly elected from 22 single-member electorates called "provinces". The members of the council sat for two assembly terms so two members sat for each province. This is a list of the provinces as of 2005:

- Ballarat Province (1937)
- Central Highlands Province (1976)
- Chelsea Province (1976)
- Doutta Galla Province (1937)
- East Yarra Province (1904)
- Eumemmerring Province (1985)
- Geelong Province (1976)
- Gippsland Province (1882)
- Higinbotham Province (1937)
- Jika Jika Province (1985)
- Koonung Province (1992)
- Melbourne Province (1882)
- Melbourne North Province (1904)
- Melbourne West Province (1904)
- Monash Province (1937)
- North Eastern Province (1882)
- North Western Province^{#} (1856)
- Silvan Province (1992)
- South Eastern Province (1882)
- Templestowe Province (1967)
- Waverley Province (1976)
- Western Province^{#} (1856)
- Western Port Province (2002)

The following provinces also existed but were abolished prior to 2002:

- Bendigo Province (1904–1985)
- Boronia Province (1967–1992)
- Central Province^{#} (1856–1882)
- Eastern Province^{#} (1856–1882)
- Melbourne East Province (1904–1937)
- Melbourne South Province (1904–1937)
- Nelson Province (1882–1937)
- North Central Province (1882–1904)
- North Yarra Province (1882–1904)
- Northern Province (1882–1976)
- Nunawading Province (1976–1992)
- Public and Railway Officers Province (1904–1907)
- South Western Province^{#} (1856–1976)
- South Yarra Province (1882–1904)
- Southern Province^{#} (1856–1967)
- Thomastown Province (1976–1985)
- Wellington Province (1882–1937)

^{#} = Original Province of inaugural (upper-house chamber) Legislative Council 1856

The old system tended to favour the Liberal Party and the National Party (often in coalition) over the Labor Party and other parties. This caused many instances where a Labor-controlled Assembly faced an opposition-controlled Council — a rare occurrence elsewhere in Australia.

== Electoral districts 1851 to 1856 ==
The Victorian Legislative Council was initially a single chamber (unicameral) when first created and consisted of members some of whom were nominated and some elected. The electoral districts were:

- Avoca (Note: added in the expansion of the council in 1855.)
- Ballaarat
- Belfast and Warrnambool
- Castlemaine
- Geelong
- Gipps' Land
- Grant
- Kilmore, Kyneton and Seymour
- Loddon
- City of Melbourne
- Murray
- Normanby, Dundas and Follett
- North Bourke
- Ovens
- Portland
- Ripon, Hampden, Grenville and Polwarth
- Sandhurst
- South Bourke, Evelyn and Mornington
- Talbot, Dalhousie and Anglesey
- Villiers and Heytesbury
- Wimmera

== MLCs by regions ==
=== Northern Metropolitan Region ===
Election	1st MLC	2nd MLC	3rd MLC	4th MLC	5th MLC
2006	Labor (Theo Theophanous)	Liberal (Matthew Guy)	Labor (Jenny Mikakos)	Greens (Greg Barber)	Labor (Nazih Elasmar)
2010	Labor (Jenny Mikakos)	Liberal (Matthew Guy)	Greens (Greg Barber)	Labor (Nazih Elasmar)	Liberal (Craig Ondarchie)
2014	Labor (Jenny Mikakos)	Liberal (Craig Ondarchie)	Greens (Greg Barber)	Labor (Nazih Elasmar)	Sex Party (Fiona Patten)
2018	Labor (Jenny Mikakos)	Labor (Nazih Elasmar)	Greens (Samantha Ratnam)	Liberal (Craig Ondarchie)	Reason (Fiona Patten)
2022	Labor (Sheena Watt)	Liberal (Evan Mulholland)	Greens (Samantha Ratnam)	Labor (Enver Erdogan)	Democratic Labour (Adem Somyurek)

=== Southern Metropolitan Region ===
Election	1st MLC	2nd MLC	3rd MLC	4th MLC	5th MLC
2006	Liberal (David Davis)	Labor (John Lenders)	Liberal (Andrea Coote)	Greens (Sue Pennicuik)	Labor (Evan Thornley)
2010	Liberal (David Davis)	Labor (John Lenders)	Liberal (Andrea Coote)	Liberal (Georgie Crozier)	Greens (Sue Pennicuik)
2014	Liberal (David Davis)	Labor (Philip Dalidakis)	Liberal (Georgie Crozier)	Greens (Sue Pennicuik)	Liberal (Margaret Fitzherbert)
2018	Liberal (David Davis)	Labor (Philip Dalidakis)	Liberal (Georgie Crozier)	Labor (Nina Taylor)	Sustainable (Clifford Hayes)
2022	Liberal (David Davis)	Labor (John Berger)	Liberal (Georgie Crozier)	Greens (Katherine Copsey)	Labor (Ryan Batchelor)

=== North-Eastern Metropolitan Region ===
Election	1st MLC	2nd MLC	3rd MLC	4th MLC	5th MLC
2006	Liberal (Richard Dalla-Riva)	Labor (Shaun Leane)	Liberal (Bruce Atkinson)	Labor (Brian Tee)	Liberal (Jan Kronberg)
2010	Liberal (Richard Dalla-Riva)	Labor (Shaun Leane)	Liberal (Bruce Atkinson)	Liberal (Jan Kronberg)	Labor (Brian Tee)
2014	Liberal (Mary Wooldridge)	Labor (Shaun Leane)	Liberal (Bruce Atkinson)	Liberal (Richard Dalla-Riva)	Greens (Samantha Dunn)
2018	Labor (Shaun Leane)	Liberal (Mary Wooldridge)	Labor (Sonja Terpstra)	Liberal (Bruce Atkinson)	Transport Matters (Rod Barton)
2022	Labor (Shaun Leane)	Liberal (Matthew Bach)	Labor (Sonja Terpstra)	Liberal (Nick McGowan)	Greens (Aiv Puglielli)

=== South-Eastern Metropolitan Region ===
Election	1st MLC	2nd MLC	3rd MLC	4th MLC	5th MLC
2006	Labor (Gavin Jennings)	Liberal (Gordon Rich-Phillips)	Labor (Adem Somyurek)	Liberal (Inga Peulich)	Labor (Bob Smith)
2010	Labor (Gavin Jennings)	Liberal (Gordon Rich-Phillips)	Labor (Adem Somyurek)	Liberal (Inga Peulich)	Labor (Lee Tarlamis)
2014	Labor (Gavin Jennings)	Liberal (Gordon Rich-Phillips)	Labor (Adem Somyurek)	Liberal (Inga Peulich)	Greens (Nina Springle)
2018	Labor (Gavin Jennings)	Labor (Adem Somyurek)	Liberal (Gordon Rich-Phillips)	Labor (Tien Kieu)	Liberal Democrats (David Limbrick)
2022	Labor (Lee Tarlamis)	Liberal (Ann-Marie Hermans)	Labor (Michael Galea)	Legalise Cannabis (Rachel Payne)	Liberal Democrats (David Limbrick)

=== Western Metropolitan Region ===
Election	1st MLC	2nd MLC	3rd MLC	4th MLC	5th MLC
2006	Labor (Justin Madden)	Liberal (Bernie Finn)	Labor (Khalil Eideh)	Labor (Martin Pakula)	Greens (Colleen Hartland)
2010	Labor (Martin Pakula)	Liberal (Bernie Finn)	Labor (Khalil Eideh)	Liberal (Andrew Elsbury)	Greens (Colleen Hartland)
2014	Labor (Cesar Melhem)	Liberal (Bernie Finn)	Labor (Khalil Eideh)	Greens (Colleen Hartland)	Democratic Labour (Rachel Carling-Jenkins)
2018	Labor (Cesar Melhem)	Labor (Ingrid Stitt)	Liberal (Bernie Finn)	Labor (Kaushaliya Vaghela)	Justice (Catherine Cumming)
2022	Labor (Lizzie Blandthorn)	Liberal (Moira Deeming)	Labor (Ingrid Stitt)	Legalise Cannabis (David Ettershank)	Liberal (Trung Luu)

=== Northern Victoria Region ===

Election	1st MLC	2nd MLC	3rd MLC	4th MLC	5th MLC
2006	Labor (Candy Broad)	Liberal (Wendy Lovell)	Nationals (Damian Drum)	Liberal (Donna Petrovich)	Labor (Kaye Darveniza)
2010	Liberal (Wendy Lovell)	Labor (Candy Broad)	Nationals (Damian Drum)	Labor (Kaye Darveniza)	Liberal (Donna Petrovich)
2014	Liberal (Wendy Lovell)	Labor (Steve Herbert)	Nationals (Damian Drum)	SFF (Daniel Young)	Labor (Jaclyn Symes)
2018	Labor (Mark Gepp)	Liberal (Wendy Lovell)	Liberal Democrats (Tim Quilty)	Justice (Tania Maxwell)	Labor (Jaclyn Symes)
2022	Liberal (Wendy Lovell)	Labor (Jaclyn Symes)	Nationals (Gaelle Broad)	Animal Justice (Georgie Purcell)	One Nation (Rikkie-Lee Tyrrell)

=== Eastern Victoria Region ===
Election	1st MLC	2nd MLC	3rd MLC	4th MLC	5th MLC
2006	Liberal (Philip Davis)	Labor (Matt Viney)	Liberal (Edward O'Donohue)	Labor (Johan Scheffer)	Nationals (Peter Hall)
2010	Liberal (Philip Davis)	Labor (Matt Viney)	Nationals (Peter Hall)	Liberal (Edward O'Donohue)	Labor (Johan Scheffer)
2014	Liberal (Edward O'Donohue)	Labor (Harriet Shing)	Nationals (Danny O'Brien)	SFF (Jeff Bourman)	Labor (Daniel Mulino)
2018	Liberal (Edward O'Donohue)	Labor (Jane Garrett)	Nationals (Melina Bath)	Labor (Harriet Shing)	SFF (Jeff Bourman)
2022	Liberal (Renee Heath)	Labor (Tom McIntosh)	Nationals (Melina Bath)	Labor (Harriet Shing)	SFF (Jeff Bourman)

=== Western Victoria Region ===
Election	1st MLC	2nd MLC	3rd MLC	4th MLC	5th MLC
2006	Labor (Jaala Pulford)	Liberal (John Vogels)	Labor (Gayle Tierney)	Liberal (David Koch)	Democratic Labour (Peter Kavanagh)
2010	Liberal (David Koch)	Labor (Jaala Pulford)	Liberal (Simon Ramsay)	Labor (Gayle Tierney)	Nationals (David O'Brien)
2014	Liberal (Simon Ramsay)	Labor (Jaala Pulford)	Liberal (Josh Morris)	Labor (Gayle Tierney)	Local Jobs (James Purcell)
2018	Labor (Jaala Pulford)	Liberal (Bev McArthur)	Labor (Gayle Tierney)	Justice (Stuart Grimley)	Animal Justice (Andy Meddick)
2022	Labor (Jacinta Ermacora)	Liberal (Bev McArthur)	Labor (Gayle Tierney)	Greens (Sarah Mansfield)	Liberal (Joe McCracken)
