= Electoral results for the Western Victoria Region =

This is a list of electoral results for the Western Victoria Region in Victorian state elections from the region's creation in 2006 until the present.

== Election results ==
=== Elections in the 2020s ===
==== 2022 ====
Labor were defending two seats. The Liberal Party, Derryn Hinch's Justice Party, and the Animal Justice Party were defending one seat each.

2022 Victorian state election: Western Victoria
Party	Candidate	Votes	%	±%
Quota		82,036		
Labor	1. Jacinta Ermacora (elected 1); 2. Gayle Tierney (elected 3); 3. Megan Bridger-Darling; 4. Sue Pavlovich; 5. Heather Stokes	175,024	35.56	−2.66
Liberal/National Coalition	1. Bev McArthur (elected 2); 2. Joe McCracken (elected 5); 3. Anita Rank; 4. Angela Shearman; 5. Robert Letts	133,231	27.07	−2.80
Greens	1. Sarah Mansfield (elected 4); 2. John Barnes; 3. Judith Baldacchino; 4. Eva van der Vlies; 5. Linda Zibell	42,709	8.68	+1.18
Legalise Cannabis	1. Andrew Dowling; 2. Melanie Humphrey	24,763	5.03	+5.03
Shooters, Fishers, Farmers	1. Ben Collyer; 2. Graeme Standen	18,460	3.78	−0.67
Liberal Democrats	1. Julia McGrath; 2. Paul Barker	16,471	3.35	+0.71
One Nation	1. Terri Elizabeth Pryse-Smith; 2. Sabine De Pyle	13,065	2.65	+2.65
Democratic Labour	1. Costa Di Biase; 2. Ron Skrunzy	10,696	2.17	+0.60
Family First	1. Dean Conkwright; 2. Chioma Ikeh	10,320	2.10	+2.10
Justice	1. Stuart Grimley; 2. Simone O'Brien	8,697	1.77	−2.69
Animal Justice	1. Andy Meddick; 2. Hannah Wilshier	8,660	1.76	−1.01
Sack Dan Andrews	1. Tosh-Jake Finnigan; 2. Ismail Efe Celikdogen; 3. Sinan Orhan	5,012	1.02	+1.02
Victorian Socialists	1. Madilyn Gorman; 2. Abbey Randall	3,656	0.74	+0.00
United Australia	1. Natalie Valerie Failla; 2. Keith Raymond	3,620	0.73	+0.73
Reason	1. Emma Sinclair; 2. Olivia Hurley	3,475	0.71	−0.21
Angry Victorians	1. Chris Burson; 2. Richard Beeck	2,699	0.55	+0.55
Health Australia	1. Constantine Lazos; 2. Angelica Brennfleck	2,607	0.53	−0.20
Companions and Pets	1. Geoff Collins; 2. Simone Fisher	2,544	0.52	+0.52
Freedom	1. Antun Kovac; 2. Flor Vanessa Becerra-Kovac	2,307	0.47	+0.47
Sustainable Australia	1. Madeleine Wearne; 2. Robert Pascoe	2,083	0.42	−0.21
Transport Matters	1. Antonela Kearns; 2. Eddie Dunn	1,457	0.30	−0.23
New Democrats	1. Cecilia Gomez Benitez; 2. Vijaykumar Kachhia; 3. Hardik Bipinchandra Dave; 4. Jaymik Mahendrakumar Patel	541	0.11	+0.11
Ind. (Indigenous)	1. Storm Hellmuth	161	0.03	+0.03
Total formal votes		464,784	96.62	+0.75
Informal votes		14,734	3.38	−0.75
Turnout		509,387	89.20	−2.24

=== Elections in the 2010s ===
==== 2018 ====
Liberals/National coalition and Labor were defending 2 seats each. Vote 1 Local Jobs were defending one seat.

2018 Victorian state election: Western Victoria
Party	Candidate	Votes	%	±%
Quota		76,750		
Labor	1. Jaala Pulford (elected 1); 2. Gayle Tierney (elected 3); 3. Dylan Wight; 4. Lorraine O'Dal; 5. Bernard Gartland	175,836	38.18	+4.13
Liberal/National Coalition	1. Bev McArthur (elected 2); 2. Josh Morris; 3. Jo Armstrong; 4. Jennifer Lowe; 5. Andrew Black	137,825	29.92	−7.04
Greens	1. Lloyd Davies; 2. Judy Cameron; 3. Peter Mewett; 4. David Jefferson; 5. Judith Baldacchino	34,482	7.49	−1.70
Justice	1. Stuart Grimley (elected 4); 2. Michelle Tedesco	20,487	4.45	+4.45
Shooters, Fishers, Farmers	1. Geoff Collins; 2. Graeme Standen	20,412	4.43	+2.14
Animal Justice	1. Andy Meddick (elected 5); 2. Jen Gamble	12,736	2.77	+1.09
Liberal Democrats	1. Lachlan Christie; 2. Paul Robson	12,120	2.63	+0.04
Voluntary Euthanasia	1. Katrina Nugent; 2. John Berenyi	8,741	1.90	+1.90
Democratic Labour	1. Frances Beaumont; 2. Christian Schultink	7,246	1.57	+0.04
Country	1. Costa Di Biase; 2. John Buchholtz	6,310	1.37	+0.38
Aussie Battler	1. Anthony Prelorenzo; 2. Mark Mitchell	5,441	1.18	+1.18
Reason	1. Michael Bell; 2. Liam Hastie	4,230	0.92	−1.58
Victorian Socialists	1. Tim Gooden; 2. Nada Iskra	3,426	0.74	+0.74
Health Australia	1. Sonja Ljavroska; 2. Kayleen Thoren	3,346	0.73	+0.73
Sustainable Australia	1. Robert Pascoe; 2. Christopher Lynch	2,915	0.63	+0.63
Transport Matters	1. Nicholas Croker; 2. Francesco Raco	2,419	0.53	+0.53
Liberty Alliance	1. Kenneth Nicholls; 2. Daniel Macdonald	2,384	0.52	+0.52
Hudson for Northern Victoria	1. Sally Hudson; 2. Mark Wright	223	0.05	+0.05
Independent	1. Karl Pongracic	126	0.03	+0.03
Total formal votes		460,498	95.87	−1.16
Informal votes		19,819	4.13	+1.16
Turnout		480,317	91.44	−2.95

==== 2014 ====
2014 Victorian state election: Western Victoria
Party	Candidate	Votes	%	±%
Quota		72,940		
Liberal/National Coalition	1. Simon Ramsay (elected 1); 2. Josh Morris (elected 3); 3. David O'Brien; 4. Jennifer Almeida Reis; 5. Donna Winfield	161,755	36.96	−7.39
Labor	1. Jaala Pulford (elected 2); 2. Gayle Tierney (elected 4); 3. Jacinta Ermacora; 4. John Stewart; 5. Dale Edwards	149,033	34.05	−3.50
Greens	1. Lloyd Davies; 2. Judy Cameron; 3. Linda Zibell; 4. Ricky Lane; 5. Patchouly Paterson	40,235	9.19	−0.62
Palmer United	1. Catriona Thoolen; 2. Gerard Murphy; 3. Cameron Hickey	11,704	2.67	+2.67
Liberal Democrats	1. Mark Thompson; 2. Baydon Beddoe	11,321	2.59	+2.59
Sex Party	1. Jayden Millard; 2. Douglas Leitch	10,925	2.50	+2.50
Shooters and Fishers	1. Nicole Bourman; 2. Megan Winter	10,028	2.29	+2.29
Family First	1. Barry Newton; 2. Julie Gebbing	8,513	1.95	−1.32
Animal Justice	1. Andy Meddick; 2. Jennifer Gamble	7,346	1.68	+1.68
Democratic Labour	1. Mark Farrell; 2. Joanne Schill	6,694	1.53	−0.62
Vote 1 Local Jobs	1. James Purcell (elected 5); 2. Tanya Waterson	5,621	1.28	+1.28
Country Alliance	1. Garry Kerr; 2. Ronald Heath	4,341	0.99	−1.71
Christians	1. Anne Foster; 2. Leo van Veelen	3,720	0.85	+0.85
Cyclists	1. Kathy Francis; 2. Colin Charles	1,762	0.40	+0.40
People Power Victoria	1. Philip Gluyas; 2. Dianne Bell	1,687	0.39	+0.39
Rise Up Australia	1. Michael Keane; 2. Merle Johnston	1,481	0.34	+0.34
Voice for the West	1. Garry Thomas; 2. Johanne Curran	1,338	0.31	+0.31
Independent	Gary Mannion	134	0.03	+0.03
Total formal votes		437,637	97.03	
Informal votes		13,388	2.97	
Turnout		451,025	94.39	

==== 2010 ====
2010 Victorian state election: Western Victoria
Party	Candidate	Votes	%	±%
Quota		70,933		
Liberal/National Coalition	1. David Koch (elected 1); 2. Simon Ramsay (elected 3); 3. David O'Brien (elected 5); 4. Melanie Dow; 5. Ruby Cameron	184,446	43.3	+2.5
Labor	1. Jaala Pulford (elected 2); 2. Gayle Tierney (elected 4); 3. Richard Morrow; 4. Geoff Dawson; 5. Paul Romas	162,807	38.3	−3.7
Greens	1. Marcus Ward; 2. Judy Cameron; 3. Jamal Blakkarly; 4. Susan Perron; 5. Jean Christie	43,525	10.2	+1.6
Family First	1. Joshua Reimer; 2. Graeme Presser; 3. Trevor Pearce; 4. Jahzeel Concepcion; 5. Jim Rainey	14,165	3.3	−0.6
Country Alliance	1. Miles Hodge; 2. Ron Heath	11,399	2.7	+1.8
Democratic Labor	1. Peter Kavanagh; 2. Steve Campbell; 3. Jane Byrne; 4. Maria Mazzarella; 5. Max Crockett	9,252	2.2	−0.5
Total formal votes		425,594	97.1	+0.7
Informal votes		12,882	2.9	−0.7
Turnout		438,476	94.0	+0.5

=== Elections in the 2000s ===
==== 2006 ====
2006 Victorian state election: Western Victoria
Party	Candidate	Votes	%	±%
Quota		65,747		
Labor	1. Jaala Pulford (elected 1); 2. Gayle Tierney (elected 3); 3. Elaine Carbines; 4. Christine Couzens; 5. Chris Papas	165,712	42.0	−5.3
Liberal	1. John Vogels (elected 2); 2. David Koch (elected 4); 3. Kate Bullen; 4. Paul Johnston; 5. John Oxley	139,114	35.3	−1.9
Greens	1. Marcus Ward; 2. Gillian Blair; 3. Stephen Chenery; 4. Karen McAloon; 5. Judy Cameron	34,022	8.6	+0.4
National	1. Samantha McIntosh; 2. Peter McIntyre	21,902	5.6	+0.3
Family First	1. Gordon Alderson; 2. Monique Podbury; 3. Michael Croot; 4. Anna Jennings; 5. Michael Albers	15,512	3.9	+3.9
Democratic Labor	1. Peter Kavanagh (elected 5); 2. Clare Power; 3. David Power; 4. Michael Casanova; 5. Leanne Casanova	10,485	2.7	+2.7
Country Alliance	1. Miles Hodge; 2. Ron Heath	3,500	0.9	+0.9
People Power	1. Greg Jones; 2. Lachlan Jones	2,922	0.7	+0.7
Socialist Alliance	1. Sue Bull; 2. Rowan Stewart	1,130	0.3	+0.3
Independent	John Camilleri	179	0.05	+0.05
Total formal votes		394,478	96.4	−0.5
Informal votes		14,588	3.6	+0.5
Turnout		409,066	93.5	
