= Candidates of the 2010 Victorian state election =

This is a list of candidates for the 2010 Victorian state election. The election was held on 27 November 2010.

== Retiring MPs ==
=== Labor ===
- Peter Batchelor MLA (Thomastown)
- Bob Cameron MLA (Bendigo West)
- Carlo Carli MLA (Brunswick)
- Judy Maddigan MLA (Essendon)
- Karen Overington MLA (Ballarat West)
- George Seitz MLA (Keilor)

=== Liberal ===
- Helen Shardey MLA (Caulfield)
- John Vogels MLC (Western Victoria Region)

=== National ===
- Ken Jasper MLA (Murray Valley)

== Legislative Assembly ==
Sitting members are shown in bold text. Successful candidates are highlighted in the relevant colour. Where there is possible confusion, an asterisk (*) is also used.

Electorate	Held by	Labor candidates	Coalition candidates	Greens candidates	Family First candidates	Other candidates
Albert Park	Labor	**Martin Foley**	Mark Lopez (Lib)	Ann Birrell	Josie Young	Katie Blakey (ASP); Serge Thomann (Ind)
Altona	Labor	**Jill Hennessy**	Mark Rose (Lib)	David Strangward	Liz Mumby	Brijender Nain (Ind)
Ballarat East	Labor	**Geoff Howard**	Ben Taylor (Lib)	Linda Zibell	Gary Greville	
Ballarat West	Labor	Sharon Knight	Craig Coltman (Lib)	Leon Dwyer	Dale Butterfield	Carl Wesley (CA)
Bass	Liberal	Gerry Lonergan	**Ken Smith** (Lib)	Neil Rankine		Bruce Rogers (CA)
Bayswater	Liberal	Peter Lockwood	**Heidi Victoria** (Lib)	James Tennant	Gary Coombes	Ronald Prendergast (DLP); Sotiria Stratis (ASP)
Bellarine	Labor	**Lisa Neville**	Kurt Reiter (Lib)	Judy Baldacchino	Lara Duff	Mitch Cherry (SA); Klaus Clapinski (DLP); Stephen Juhasz (Ind); Nick McCallum (CA)
Benalla	National	Rowena Allen	**Bill Sykes** (Nat)	Kammy Cordner Hunt		Rochelle Hunt (CA); Nicholas Williams (Ind)
Benambra	Liberal	John Williams	**Bill Tilley** (Lib)	Jenny O'Connor	Robert Cavedon	Haden Macaulay (CA)
Bendigo East	Labor	**Jacinta Allan**	Michael Langdon (Lib); Peter Schwarz (Nat)	Tim Bardsley	Belinda Guerra	Gary Hillier (ASP); Rod Leunig (CA); James Stewart (DLP); Ben Veitz (CDP)
Bendigo West	Labor	Maree Edwards	Anita Donlon (Lib); Steven Oliver (Nat)	Sue Ellen Radford	Frances Wintle	Sandra Caddy (DLP); Anne Foster (CDP); Trevor Phillips (CA)
Bentleigh	Labor	**Rob Hudson**	Elizabeth Miller (Lib)	Brett Hedger	Lex Graber	Julian Coutts (DLP); John Myers (Ind)
Box Hill	Liberal	Peter Chandler	**Robert Clark** (Lib)	Tim Baxter	Gary Ong	
Brighton	Liberal	Tom Daley	**Louise Asher** (Lib)	Margaret Beavis	Laurence Giddings	Alan Thompson (Ind)
Broadmeadows	Labor	**John Brumby**	Samli Ozturk (Lib)	Jaime de Loma-Osorio		Kevin Butler (DLP); Peter Byrne (Ind)
Brunswick	Labor	Jane Garrett	Kyle Dadleh (Lib)	Cyndi Dawes		Bill Cawte (Ind); Phil Cleary (Ind); Trent Hawkins (SA); Amy Mulcahy (ASP)
Bulleen	Liberal	Ivan Reid	**Nicholas Kotsiras** (Lib)	Fiona Mackenzie	Kevin Tan	Kelvin Eldridge (Ind)
Bundoora	Labor	**Colin Brooks**	Goldy Brar (Lib)	Tim Roberts	Luke Conlon	Karen-Joy McColl (Ind); Catherine O'Farrell (DLP)
Burwood	Labor	**Bob Stensholt**	Graham Watt (Lib)	Emily Kate Cowan	Iming Chan	Eamon Cole-Flynn (ASP); Lucia De Summa (DLP)
Carrum	Labor	**Jenny Lindell**	Donna Bauer (Lib)	Henry Kelsall	John Churchward	Steven Garland (Ind); Ewa Losinski (DLP)
Caulfield	Liberal	Heather Abramson	David Southwick (Lib)	Phillip Walker	Eric Labonne	Peter Brohier (Ind); Daniel Sapphire (Ind)
Clayton	Labor	**Hong Lim**	Justin Scott (Lib)	Matthew Billman	Darren Reid	Peter Bolling (DLP)
Cranbourne	Labor	**Jude Perera**	Geoff Ablett (Lib)	Hilary Bray	Steve Funke	Bob Halsall (Ind); Luke O'Connor (DLP); Amanda Stapledon (Ind)
Dandenong	Labor	**John Pandazopoulos**	Dale Key (Lib)	Matthew Kirwan	Damien Latcham	Christopher Blackburn (DLP)
Derrimut	Labor	**Telmo Languiller**	Wayne Tseng (Lib)	Geraldine Brooks	Colin Moyle	Michael Deverala (DLP)
Doncaster	Liberal	Charles Pick	**Mary Wooldridge** (Lib)	Nick Carson	Ken Smithies	
Eltham	Labor	**Steve Herbert**	Andrew Hart (Lib)	James Searle	Shane Porter	Trudi Aiashi (DLP)
Essendon	Labor	Justin Madden	Rebecca Gauci (Lib)	Rose Iser		Paul Giuliano (Ind); Sarah Notaro (DLP)
Evelyn	Liberal	Peter Harris	**Christine Fyffe** (Lib)	Tania Giles	David Szabo	Craig Jenkin (CA)
Ferntree Gully	Liberal	Josh Cullinan	**Nick Wakeling** (Lib)	Steve Bullock	Allister Rouse	Martin Leahy (ASP); Tanya Murphy (DLP)
Footscray	Labor	**Marsha Thomson**	Ken Betts (Lib)	Janet Rice		Catherine Cumming (Ind); Margarita Windisch (SA)
Forest Hill	Labor	**Kirstie Marshall**	Neil Angus (Lib)	Andrew Henley	Ivan Stratov	James Fung (DLP); Daniel Irwin (ASP)
Frankston	Labor	**Alistair Harkness**	Geoff Shaw (Lib)	Simon Tiller	Michael Pleiter	Shem Bennett (ASP); Denise de Graaff (DLP); Quinn McCormack (Ind)
Geelong	Labor	**Ian Trezise**	Alastair Thomson (Lib)	Bruce Lindsay	Len Lengyel	Matthew Schmidt (CA); Samantha Schultz (Ind)
Gembrook	Labor	**Tammy Lobato**	Brad Battin* (Lib); Peter McConachy (Nat)	Brent Hall	Rebecca Filliponi	Robert Belcher (Ind); Frank Dean (Ind); Alex Krstic (CA); Larry Norman (DLP); Hayden Ostrom Brown (Ind)
Gippsland East	Independent	Gregg Cook	Sonia Buckley (Lib); Tim Bull* (Nat)	Jill Redwood		**Craig Ingram** (Ind); Deborah Meester (CA)
Gippsland South	National	Steve Boyce	**Peter Ryan** (Nat)	Kate Jackson		John Hirt (CA)
Hastings	Liberal	Steve Hosking	**Neale Burgess** (Lib)	Catherine Manning	Melanie Marcin	Rob Jones (DLP); Aldona Martin (Ind); Dan Martin (CA); Joe Mavrikos (ASP)
Hawthorn	Liberal	John McNally	**Ted Baillieu** (Lib)	Jenny Henty	Peter Grounds	
Ivanhoe	Labor	Anthony Carbines	Carl Ziebell (Lib)	Paul Kennedy		Gerrit Schorel-Hlavka (Ind); Stephen Smith (DLP)
Keilor	Labor	Natalie Hutchins	Damon Ryder (Lib)	Lisa Asbury	Scott Amberley	Harpreet Walia (Ind)
Kew	Liberal	Kate Jackson	**Andrew McIntosh** (Lib)	Emma Henley	Timothy Hunter	
Kilsyth	Liberal	Vicki Setches	**David Hodgett** (Lib)	Justin-Paul Sammons	Daniel Harrison	Reinhard Dekter (DLP); Sam Haughton-Greene (ASP); Shane McKenzie (Ind)
Kororoit	Labor	**Marlene Kairouz**	Goran Kesic (Lib)	Anastasia Smietanka	Glenn Rozec	Kathy Majdlik (Ind)
Lara	Labor	**John Eren**	Robert Eyton (Lib)	Rob Leach	Glenn Colla	Keith McDermott (CA)
Lowan	National	Mandy Kirsopp	**Hugh Delahunty** (Nat)	Ben Wilkie	Randall Reimer	
Lyndhurst	Labor	**Tim Holding**	Tony Holland (Lib)	Nina Springle	Heather Wheatley	Gordon Ford (Ind); Hung Vo (Ind); Yien Machar Wang (DLP)
Macedon	Labor	**Joanne Duncan**	Tristan Weston (Lib)	Nicky Haslinghouse	Judith Hungerford	Lorraine Beyer (Ind); Gavin Greaves (CA); Sharon Lane (DLP); Mahinda Samararatna (Ind)
Malvern	Liberal	Nick Voulanas	**Michael O'Brien** (Lib)	Sam Hibbins	Miranda de la Masse-Homsy	
Melbourne	Labor	**Bronwyn Pike**	Luke Martin (Lib)	Brian Walters		Maxine Fensom (Ind); Rory Killen (ASP); Peter Lazzari (Ind); John Perkins (Ind)
Melton	Labor	**Don Nardella**	Braidy Kean (Lib)	Katrina Bradfield	Samir Sabeh	Matt DeLeon (Ind); Ron Guy (SA); Sav Mangion (CA)
Mildura	National	Ali Cupper	**Peter Crisp** (Nat)	Gavin Rees	Christopher Gray	Anthony Connell (Ind); Ross Douglass (DLP); Glenn Milne (Ind); Doug Tonge (Ind)
Mill Park	Labor	**Lily D'Ambrosio**	Peter Chugha (Lib)	Gurm Sekhon	Phillip Cogger	
Mitcham	Labor	**Tony Robinson**	Dee Ryall (Lib)	Sheridan Lewis	Daniel Ha	Paul Elliott (ASP); Barry O'Shea (DLP)
Monbulk	Labor	**James Merlino**	Matt Mills (Lib)	Jo Tenner	Rajeeva Gunasekera	Elizabeth Coyne (DLP); Lawrence Mobsby (Ind); Simon Picknell (CA)
Mordialloc	Labor	**Janice Munt**	Lorraine Wreford (Lib)	Camellia Feteiha	Stephen Nowland	Michael Carty (Ind); Frank Denvir (Ind); Brandon Hoult (Ind); Tom Killen (ASP); James Leach (DLP)
Mornington	Liberal	James Dooley	**David Morris** (Lib)	Martin Rush		Stephen Schafer (CA); Matt Taylor (Ind)
Morwell	National	Graeme Middlemiss	**Russell Northe** (Nat)	Dan Jordan		Glyn Baker (Ind); Peter Gardner (Ind); Peter Kelly (CA); Lou Sigmund (Ind)
Mount Waverley	Labor	**Maxine Morand**	Michael Gidley (Lib)	Josh Fergeus	John Canavan	Lisa Chevallier (ASP); Des Kelly (DLP); Ali Khan (Ind)
Mulgrave	Labor	**Daniel Andrews**	Courtney Mann (Lib)	John Janetzki	Jim Johnson	Geraldine Kokoszka (DLP)
Murray Valley	National	Lachlan Enshaw	Tim McCurdy (Nat)	Doug Ralph	Ray Hungerford	Roberto Paino (Ind); Peter Watson (CA)
Narracan	Liberal	Tony Flynn	**Gary Blackwood** (Lib)	Belinda Rogers		Brian Dungey (CA); Jenny Webb (Ind)
Narre Warren North	Labor	**Luke Donnellan**	Michelle Frazer (Lib)	Michael Schilling	Lissa McKenzie	Tim Hassan (Ind); Paul Richardson (Ind); Carmen Sant (DLP)
Narre Warren South	Labor	**Judith Graley**	Gary Rowe (Lib)	Claus Endres	Mark Konkel	Nathan Dodd (DLP); Angela Dunleavy (Ind); Ian George (Ind)
Nepean	Liberal	John Lannan	**Martin Dixon** (Lib)	Anton Vigenser		Keith Lyon (CA)
Niddrie	Labor	**Rob Hulls**	Joh Bauch (Lib)	Leharna Black	Mark Markovic	Jim Little (Ind); Robert Livesay (Ind); Steve Medcraft (Ind); John Nott (Ind); Brian Roberts (Ind)
Northcote	Labor	**Fiona Richardson**	Steve Moran (Lib)	Anne Martinelli		Robert Bishop (ASP); Darren Lewin-Hill (Ind); Dominic Marino (Ind)
Oakleigh	Labor	**Ann Barker**	Theo Zographos (Lib)	Eleanor Whyte	George Grigas	Matthew Grinter (DLP); Alan Ide (Ind)
Pascoe Vale	Labor	**Christine Campbell**	Claude Tomisich (Lib)	Liam Farrelly		Alf Hickey (Ind)
Polwarth	Liberal	Brian Crook	**Terry Mulder** (Lib)	Natalie Atherden	John Modra	Grant Beale (Ind); Garry Kerr (CA)
Prahran	Labor	**Tony Lupton**	Clem Newton-Brown (Lib)	Meni Christofakis	Simon Ronchi	Katharine Anderson (Ind); Christian Vega (ASP)
Preston	Labor	**Robin Scott**	Adin McGarvie (Lib)	Trent McCarthy		
Richmond	Labor	**Richard Wynne**	Tom McFeely (Lib)	Kathleen Maltzahn		Stephen Jolly (Ind); Angela White (ASP)
Ripon	Labor	**Joe Helper**	Vic Dunn (Lib); Wendy McIvor (Nat)	Steve Morse	Jesse Boer	Scott Watts (CA)
Rodney	National	Vanessa Langford	**Paul Weller** (Nat)	Ian Christoe	Serena Moore	Gino D'Angelo (CA)
Sandringham	Liberal	Robbie Nyaguy	**Murray Thompson** (Lib)	Derek Wilson	Malcolm Reid	
Scoresby	Liberal	Garry Nightingale	**Kim Wells** (Lib)	Salore Craig	Rachel Hanna	
Seymour	Labor	**Ben Hardman**	Cindy McLeish* (Lib); Anthony Rolando (Nat)	Huw Slater	Robert Guerra	Jan Beer (Ind); Adam Taurian (CA)
Shepparton	National	Anthony Fullarton	**Jeanette Powell** (Nat)	Lachlan Slade	Malcolm Moore	Dennis Patterson (CA); Shannon Smith (Ind); Paul Wickham (Ind)
South Barwon	Labor	**Michael Crutchfield**	Andrew Katos (Lib)	Simon Northeast	Kathleen O'Connor	Alan Barron (DLP); John Dobinson (Ind); Tony Leen (CA); Keith Oakley (Ind); Heather Wellington (Ind)
South-West Coast	Liberal	John Herbertson	**Denis Napthine** (Lib)	Jack Howard	Craig Haberfield	Tony Arscott (CA); James Purcell (Ind)
Swan Hill	National	Sharon Garrick	**Peter Walsh** (Nat)	Morgana Russell	Garion Pearse	
Tarneit	Labor	**Tim Pallas**	Glenn Goodfellow (Lib)	Bro Sheffield-Brotherton	Lori McLean	Michael Freeman (DLP)
Thomastown	Labor	Bronwyn Halfpenny	Michael Burge (Lib)	Andrew Calleja	Jacquie McIntosh	
Warrandyte	Liberal	Meghan Hopper	**Ryan Smith** (Lib)	Chris Padgham	Yasmin De Zilwa	Paul Slattery (Ind)
Williamstown	Labor	**Wade Noonan**	David McConnell (Lib)	Paul Fogarty	Andrew McPherson	
Yan Yean	Labor	**Danielle Green**	Jack Gange (Lib)	Karin Geradts	Ian Cranson	Pat Shea (DLP)
Yuroke	Labor	**Liz Beattie**	Philip Cutler (Lib)	Graham Dawson		

== Legislative Council ==
Sitting members are shown in bold text. Tickets that elected at least one MLC are highlighted in the relevant colour. Successful candidates are identified by an asterisk (*).

=== Eastern Metropolitan ===
The Labor Party was defending two seats. The Liberal Party was defending three seats.

Labor candidates	Liberal candidates	Greens candidates	Family First candidates	DLP candidates
1. **Shaun Leane***; 2. **Brian Tee***; 3. Anne Paul; 4. Hayley Clarke; 5. Paul Vout	1. **Richard Dalla-Riva***; 2. **Bruce Atkinson***; 3. **Jan Kronberg***; 4. Grace Tse; 5. Miriam Rawson	1. Damian Magner; 2. Linda Laos; 3. David Howell; 4. Nell Potter; 5. Howard Tankey	1. Peter Lake; 2. Gillian Schwab; 3. Phil Goodman; 4. Yuli Goh	1. Pat La Manna; 2. Stefan Kos; 3. Beverley Price; 4. Simon Costa; 5. Gregory Byrne
Group B candidates	Group G candidates			
1. Anthony Osborne; 2. Laurinda Osborne	1. Elizabeth Hartmann; 2. Leane Leggo			

=== Eastern Victoria ===
The Labor Party was defending two seats. The Liberal/National Coalition was defending three seats.

Labor candidates	Coalition candidates	Greens candidates	Family First candidates	DLP candidates	Country Alliance candidates
1. **Matt Viney***; 2. **Johan Scheffer***; 3. Maida Anderson; 4. Hedley Moffat; 5. Ben Maxfield	1. **Philip Davis*** (Lib); 2. **Peter Hall*** (Nat); 3. **Edward O'Donohue*** (Lib); 4. Rosemary Hopgood (Lib); 5. Jo Crawford-Wynd (Nat)	1. Samantha Dunn; 2. Cheryl Wragg; 3. Penelope Swales; 4. Francine Buckley; 5. Andrea Millsom	1. Linden Stokes; 2. Terry Aeschlimann	1. Walter Ius; 2. Robyn Wyatt	1. Andrew Jones; 2. Euan Murphy

=== Northern Metropolitan ===
The Labor Party was defending three seats. The Liberal Party was defending one seat. The Greens were defending one seat.

Labor candidates	Liberal candidates	Greens candidates	Family First candidates	DLP candidates	Sex Party candidates
1. **Jenny Mikakos***; 2. **Nazih Elasmar***; 3. **Nathan Murphy**; 4. Rhiannon Platt; 5. Peter Smythe	1. **Matthew Guy***; 2. Craig Ondarchie*; 3. Sam Granleese; 4. Daniel Parsons; 5. Jemma Townson	1. **Greg Barber***; 2. Alexandra Bhathal; 3. Fraser Brindley; 4. Samantha Ratnam; 5. Alister Air	1. Andrew Conlon; 2. Peter Kerin; 3. Rod Dawson	1. John Kavanagh; 2. Monica Thatcher; 3. Bridget Cashin; 4. Angela Anderson; 5. Michael Travers	1. Fiona Patten; 2. Douglas Leitch
Country Alliance candidates	CDP candidates	Group A candidates	Group C candidates	Ungrouped candidates	
1. Kevin Archibald; 2. Chris Morris	1. Vickie Janson; 2. Saleem Arthur	1. Joanne Stuart; 2. April Lee	1. Stephen Mayne; 2. Paula Piccinini	Adrian Whitehead	

=== Northern Victoria ===
The Labor Party was defending two seats. The Liberal/National Coalition was defending three seats.

Labor candidates	Coalition candidates	Greens candidates	Family First candidates	DLP candidates
1. **Candy Broad***; 2. **Kaye Darveniza***; 3. Jamie Byron; 4. Shaun Rosaia; 5. Anthony Sheridan	1. **Wendy Lovell*** (Lib); 2. **Damian Drum*** (Nat); 3. **Donna Petrovich*** (Lib); 4. Reid Mather (Nat); 5. Martin Ireland (Lib)	1. David Jones; 2. Helen Robinson; 3. Hans Paas; 4. Kate Toll; 5. Ben Robertson	1. Laurie Wintle; 2. Neville Hunter	1. Mark Royal; 2. John Carty
Sex Party candidates	Country Alliance candidates	CDP candidates		
1. Tristram Chellew; 2. Justine Arfaras	1. Steven Threlfall; 2. Frank Gaylard	1. Ewan McDonald; 2. Steve Flanagan		

=== South Eastern Metropolitan ===
The Labor Party was defending three seats. The Liberal Party was defending two seats.

Labor candidates	Liberal candidates	Greens candidates	Family First candidates	DLP candidates	CDP candidates
1. **Gavin Jennings***; 2. **Adem Somyurek***; 3. Lee Tarlamis*; 4. Kelly Liu; 5. Janet Kaylock	1. **Gordon Rich-Phillips***; 2. **Inga Peulich***; 3. Gladys Liu; 4. Ashton Ashokkumar; 5. Tim Cincotta	1. Colin Long; 2. Dee-Ann Kelly; 3. Chris Carman; 4. Linda McIver; 5. Daniela Tymms	1. Felicity Hemmersbach; 2. Jadah Pleiter	1. Geraldine Gonsalvez; 2. Catherine Dodd; 3. Agnieszka Chlipala; 4. Genevieve Cattell; 5. Helen O'Loghlen	1. Vivian Hill; 2. Wolf Voigt

=== Southern Metropolitan ===
The Labor Party was defending two seats. The Liberal Party was defending two seats. The Greens were defending one seat.

Labor candidates	Liberal candidates	Greens candidates	Family First candidates	DLP candidates
1. **John Lenders***; 2. **Jennifer Huppert**; 3. Zoe Edwards; 4. Pablo Salina; 5. Michael Suss	1. **David Davis***; 2. **Andrea Coote***; 3. Georgie Crozier*; 4. Jane Hume; 5. Adam Held	1. **Sue Pennicuik***; 2. Neil Pilling; 3. Clare Pilcher; 4. Bruce McPhate; 5. Des Benson	1. Ashley Trüter; 2. Joyce Khoo	1. Michael Murphy; 2. Brendan Prendergast
Sex Party candidates	CDP candidates	Group E candidates	Ungrouped candidates	
1. Ken Hill; 2. Danyel Payne	1. Mansel Rogerson; 2. Ray Levick	1. Vern Hughes; 2. Suzette Gallagher	Mike Cockburn	

=== Western Metropolitan ===
The Labor Party was defending three seats. The Liberal Party was defending one seat. The Greens were defending one seat.

Labor candidates	Liberal candidates	Greens candidates	Family First candidates	DLP candidates	Sex Party candidates
1. **Martin Pakula***; 2. **Khalil Eideh***; 3. **Bob Smith**; 4. Llewellyn Rees; 5. Claudine Spinner	1. **Bernie Finn***; 2. Andrew Elsbury*; 3. Victoria Fairbairn; 4. Jeremy Barth; 5. William Kenny	1. **Colleen Hartland***; 2. Robert Humphreys; 3. Liz Ingham; 4. Simon Crawford; 5. Owen Gale	1. Daniel Mumby; 2. Lisa Garay	1. Mark Farrell; 2. Stephanie Mazzarella; 3. Georga Byrne; 4. Samuel Notaro; 5. Marguerita Kavanagh	1. Joël Murray; 2. Merinda Davis

=== Western Victoria ===
The Labor Party was defending two seats. The Liberal Party was defending two seats. The Democratic Labor Party was defending one seat.

Labor candidates	Coalition candidates	Greens candidates	Family First candidates	DLP candidates	Country Alliance candidates
1. **Jaala Pulford***; 2. **Gayle Tierney***; 3. Richard Morrow; 4. Geoff Dawson; 5. Paul Romas	1. **David Koch*** (Lib); 2. Simon Ramsay* (Lib); 3. David O'Brien* (Nat); 4. Melanie Dow (Lib); 5. Ruby Cameron (Nat)	1. Marcus Ward; 2. Judy Cameron; 3. Jamal Blakkarly; 4. Susan Perron; 5. Jean Christie	1. Joshua Reimer; 2. Graeme Presser; 3. Trevor Pearce; 4. Jahzeel Concepcion; 5. Jim Rainey	1. **Peter Kavanagh**; 2. Steve Campbell; 3. Jane Byrne; 4. Maria Mazzarella; 5. Max Crockett	1. Miles Hodge; 2. Ron Heath

== Unregistered parties and groups ==
Some parties and groups that did not qualify for registration with the Victorian Electoral Commission nevertheless endorsed candidates, who appeared on the ballot papers as independent candidates.

- The Australian Democrats endorsed Daniel Sapphire in Caulfield, Hayden Ostrom Brown in Gembrook, Shane McKenzie in Kilsyth, Robert Livesay in Niddrie and Alan Ide in Oakleigh.
- The "Make the State Pay" group endorsed Bob Halsall in Cranbourne, Tim Hassan in Narre Warren North and Angela Dunleavy in Narre Warren South.
- The Socialist Equality Party endorsed Peter Byrne in Broadmeadows.
- The Secular Party of Australia endorsed John Perkins in Melbourne.
- The Socialist Party endorsed Stephen Jolly in Richmond.
- The "Plug the Pipe" group endorsed Jan Beer in Seymour.
- The Pedestrian08 Campaign endorsed ungrouped candidate Mike Cockburn in Southern Metropolitan.
- South Australian Senator Nick Xenophon endorsed Lorraine Beyer in Macedon and Stephen Mayne's Group C in Northern Metropolitan.

== See also ==
- 2010 Victorian state election
- Members of the Victorian Legislative Assembly, 2006–2010
- Members of the Victorian Legislative Council, 2006–2010
- Members of the Victorian Legislative Assembly, 2010–2014
- Members of the Victorian Legislative Council, 2010–2014
