= Group voting ticket =

Preference lists submitted by political parties

A group voting ticket (GVT) is a shortcut for voters in a preferential voting system, where a voter can indicate support for a list of candidates instead of marking preferences for individual candidates. For multi-member electoral divisions with single transferable voting, a group or party registers a GVT before an election with the electoral commission. When a voter selects a group or party above the line on a ballot paper, their vote is distributed according to the registered GVT for that group.

In Australia it is known as group ticket vote or ticket voting. As of 2026, group voting tickets are still used for elections in only one jurisdiction in the country: the Councillor ballot for City of Melbourne local government elections. In South Australia House of Assembly elections, parties can submit preference tickets which are used to save a vote that would otherwise be informal. GVTs have been abolished by New South Wales, South Australia, Victoria and Western Australia. They were used in the Australian Senate from the 1984 federal election until the 2013 federal election. Tasmania has never used ticket voting.

A form of GVT is used for some elections in Fiji.

The introduction of GVTs in Australia led to the proliferation of microparties and the creation of preference deals between them, enabling one or more candidates within the network of parties to receive sufficient preferences to achieve the quota for election, especially in multi-member electoral divisions. Such preference deals were first arranged for the 1999 NSW election, where three members of the Minor Party Alliance were elected.

== Above the line voting ==
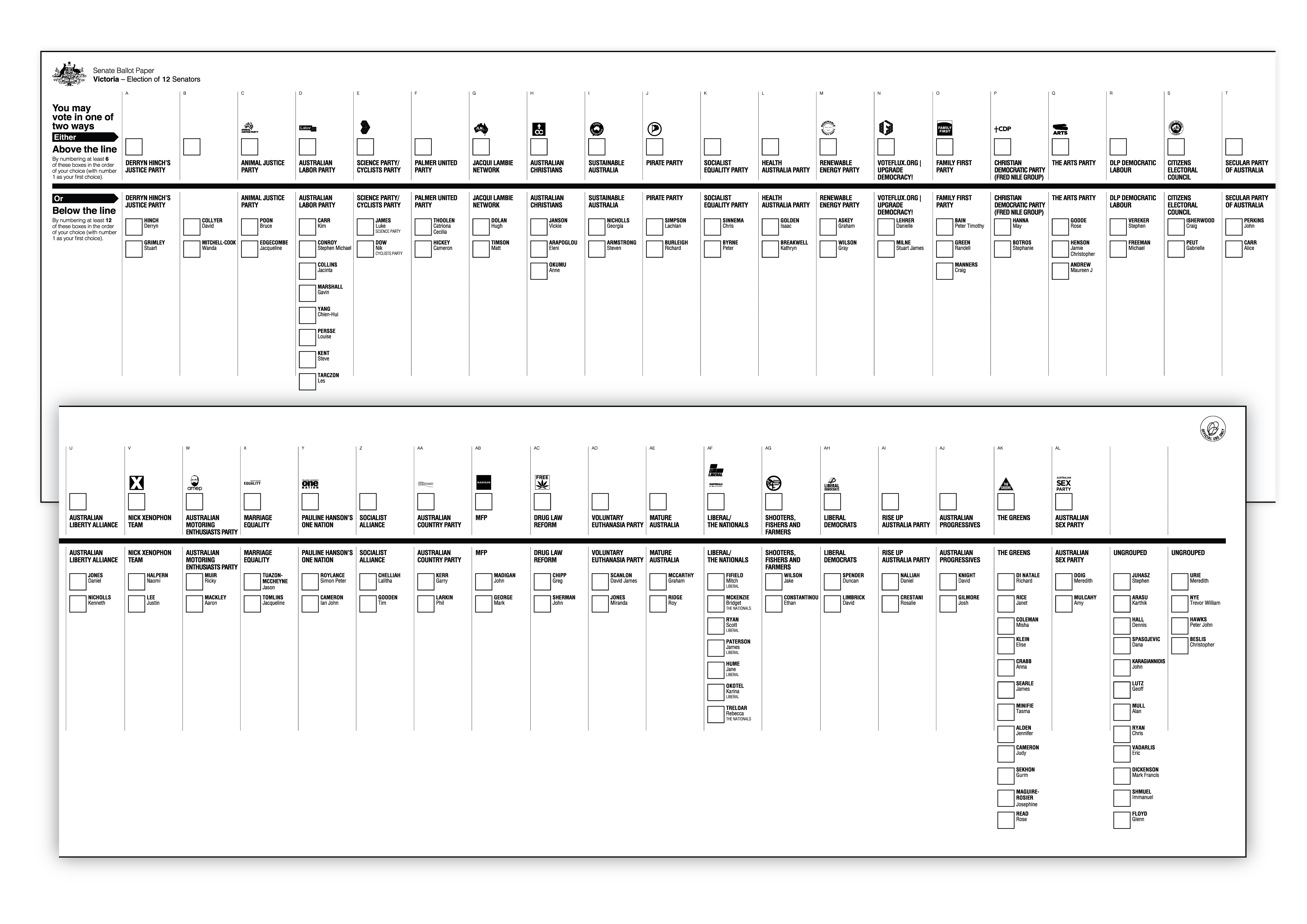
Australian Senate ballot paper used in Victoria for 2016

Every Australian jurisdiction that has introduced GVTs has ballot papers with two sections separated by a line. Voters may choose to vote either above the line or below the line. By voting below the line voters can rank candidates individually by numbering boxes. Voters can choose to vote for a group ticket by placing the number '1' in one of the ticket boxes above the line. The single number '1' selects a GVT from one group or party, and all preferences are then distributed according to the GVT. This leads to pre-election trading between parties on how each group will allocate later preferences to other groups and candidates.

About 95% of voters vote above the line.

In elections where GVTs have been abolished, voters can now express an order of preferences for parties by voting '1', '2' and so on in different boxes above the line. The scope of a number above the line is merely the list of candidates for that party, so Group Voting Tickets are no longer used in those elections. The party supplies a list of its candidates to the relevant Electoral Commission before the election. All four jurisdictions have limited optional preferential voting, which enables voters to number as many boxes as they choose, but the number only applies to the registered party list.

== History ==
Voting is compulsory in all Australian jurisdictions for all houses of Parliament.

Complete preferences voting was the only option available for the Australian Senate and the upper houses of other jurisdictions. With proportional representation and preferential voting, it was daunting for many voters to have to fill in scores of boxes on the ballot paper. Some voters would choose their early preferences and then vote for other candidates in the order they appeared on the ballot paper—known as a donkey vote; or fill in the form incorrectly, leading to an informal vote. To ease this task, the GVT option was introduced to permit voters to choose one party or group, and all the remaining squares were deemed to be filled in according to a registered party ticket.

Group voting tickets were introduced for elections for the Australian Senate by the Hawke government to reduce the number of invalid votes by simplifying the voting system for the Senate. Under the new system a voter cast a valid vote if they placed a single mark above the line instead of the scores on a typical Senate ballot paper. It was first used at the 1984 federal election. For the Australian Senate, the rate of informal voting was reduced from around 9% before 1984, to around 3%.

Group voting tickets were introduced in South Australia in 1985 in New South Wales and Western Australia in 1987 and in Victoria in 2003.

Following the use of tactical preference tickets and the record number of minor parties contesting the 1999 NSW election for the New South Wales Legislative Council, a modified form of "above the line" voting was introduced for the 2003 NSW election, effectively abolishing GVTs. Other changes to party registration processes also resulted in many fewer parties contesting NSW Legislative Council elections.

New South Wales changed "above the line" voting for Legislative Council before the 2003 NSW election to optional preferential voting. Parties are now required to submit a higher minimum number of qualified members. A candidate group for Legislative Council elections now requires at least 15 candidates to be eligible for an "above the line" box. Parties do not register group preference tickets and a single 1 in a group's box only preferences the candidates in the group. Voters wishing to preference multiple parties with an "above the line" vote can use lower preferences ("2", "3", and so on) in those parties' "above the line" boxes. The changes reduced the number of parties contesting elections and increased the difficulty for new small parties to be elected.

Group voting tickets for the Senate were abolished in March 2016 in favour of optional preferential voting in time for the 2016 federal election.

South Australia changed from group voting tickets to optional preferential voting before the 2018 South Australian election. Instructions for above the line votes are to mark '1' and then further preferences are optional. The effect of an above the line vote is now to vote for all candidates in a single group in order, and not to follow a GVT. Voters who vote below the line are instructed to provide at least 12 preferences as opposed to having to number all candidates, and with a savings provision to admit ballot papers which indicate at least 6 below the line preferences.

In November 2021, the Western Australian parliament passed legislation to abolish GVTs and move to optional preferential voting, after several minor parties were elected and came close to being elected despite earning 2% or less of the vote; in particular, the election of the Daylight Saving Party with only 98 votes in an area known for voting strongly against daylight saving was cited as to why this legislation was quickly passed.

Jurisdiction	Body elected	"Above the line" introduced	Group voting tickets used	"Below the line" preferences
Federal Parliament	Senate	1984	1984 - 2016	Optional
New South Wales	Legislative Council	1987	1988 - 2003	Optional
South Australia	Legislative Council	1985	1985 - 2018	Optional
Victoria	Legislative Council	2003	2003 - 2026	Optional
Western Australia	Legislative Council	1989	1989 - 2021	Optional

== Criticism ==
Group voting tickets voting has been criticised because electors usually do not know, and it is difficult to find out, where their preferences are being directed. All details are published in advance, both electronically and in a free booklet published by the Australian Electoral Commission or the appropriate State electoral commission. The booklets may be viewed at polling booths on request to the poll officials. However, such is the complexity of the information that it is unlikely that the average voter could easily determine the fate of their vote's preferences, particularly as some parties submit multiple allocations (e.g., 33% to one party, 66% to another, and so on), and the effects are integrally wound up in preference deals between other parties.

Using GVTs, the potential for tactical voting by parties is greatly increased. Because voters are not usually aware of how a party's preferences are directed, GVTs have allowed minor parties with low support to be elected almost exclusively on the preferences of other parties, for example, where small parties with very different views have agreed to exchange preferences, or where larger parties have sought to minimise votes for opponents with similar views. A notable case was the 1999 New South Wales state election when the Outdoor Recreation Party's Malcolm Jones was elected to the Legislative Council with a primary vote of 0.19%, or 0.042 of a quota.

GVTs came under scrutiny at the 2013 Australian election for multiple candidates getting provisionally elected with the vast majority of the 14.3% quota being filled from preferences, with "preference whisperer" Glenn Druery's Minor Party Alliance organising tight cross-preferencing between minor parties. Ricky Muir from the Australian Motoring Enthusiast Party won a senate seat on a record-low primary vote of 0.5% in Victoria (previous record held by Family First's Steve Fielding in 2004 on 1.9% in Victoria). The Sports Party's Wayne Dropulich was on track for a period of time to win a Senate seat from 0.2% in Western Australia, coming 21st out of 28 groups. Family First's Bob Day won a seat on a primary vote of 3.8% in South Australia, and the DLP's John Madigan won his seat in 2010 on a primary vote of 2.3% in Victoria. Senator Nick Xenophon and larger parties including the government proposed changes to the GVT system. Following the 2018 Victorian state election, the Victorian Greens demanded that Victoria discontinue using group voting, describing it as "corrupt" and "undemocratic", following the election of Sustainable Australia candidate Clifford Hayes to the legislative council on 1.2% of the primary vote.

In the 2021 Western Australian state election, GVTs once again came under scrutiny after the Daylight Saving Party was elected to the Legislative Council for the Mining and Pastoral Region with just 98 votes, or 0.2% of the electorate; the region had notably voted strongly against adopting a daylight saving system in prior referendums. Additionally, the Legalise Cannabis WA party won a seat on the council with only 2% of the vote; the No Mandatory Vaccination Party almost won a seat through votes given by other smaller parties through GVTs (despite none of these parties individually earning more than 1.9% of the vote), however, were defeated due to the Liberals preferencing the Greens above any of the smaller parties therefore allowing the latter to win. This led to the state government to quickly pass legislation which abolished GVTs in November of that same year.

The issue received renewed scrutiny in Victoria in April 2026, when far-right commentator Avi Yemini announced his intention to set up the "Free Palestine" party in a bid to attract votes from left-wing voters and redirect preferences of votes the party receives to right-wing parties in the 2026 Victorian state election. The electoral commission responded by confirming it had no authority to prevent parties from adopting misleading names, and in June the commission began the process of registering "Free Palestine" as a political party. In July 2026 The Age reported that the Allan government was set to introduce legislation by the end of the month to abolish group voting tickets.

The government introduced the Electoral Amendment (Miscellaneous Matters) Bill 2026 to the parliament on 28 July. The bill required voters to number at least five boxes for parties above the line, in order of preference, or else, as before, number at least five boxes for individual candidates below the line. Like the system in place for the Senate, a savings provision is incorporated so as to enable voters who mark a clear 1 but fail to number their top five preferences clearly, to still have their vote counted as formal. The electoral commission is also tasked with publishing information about newly registered political parties, a response to Yemini and other's efforts to establish parties titled with generally misleading names. The bill passed the Legislative Assembly without division on 29 July, and passed the Legislative Council without amendment by 33 votes to 4 on 11 August. The act commenced the day after royal assent was given, 19 August 2026.

Details of Victorian Legislative Council vote to abolish group voting tickets

Electoral Amendment (Miscellaneous Matters) Bill 2026 – Third Reading
Party	Votes for	Votes against	Absent/Abstained
Labor (15)	15: Ryan Batchelor; John Berger; Lizzie Blandthorn; Enver Erdogan; Jacinta Ermacora; Michael Galea; Shaun Leane; Tom McIntosh; Harriet Shing; Ingrid Stitt; Jaclyn Symes; Lee Tarlamis; Sonja Terpstra; Gayle Tierney; Sheena Watt	–	–
Liberal (11)	11: Georgie Crozier; David Davis; Renee Heath; Ann-Marie Hermans; Wendy Lovell; Trung Luu; Bev McArthur; Joe McCracken; Nick McGowan; Evan Mulholland; Richard Welch	–	–
Greens (4)	4: Katherine Copsey; Anasina Gray-Barberio; Sarah Mansfield; Aiv Puglielli	–	–
National (2)	2: Melina Bath; Gaelle Broad	–	–
Legalise Cannabis (2)	–	1: Rachel Payne	1: David Ettershank
Animal Justice (1)	–	1: Georgie Purcell	–
Libertarian (1)	–	1: David Limbrick	–
One Nation (1)	1: Rikkie-Lee Tyrrell	–	–
Shooters (1)	–	1: Jeff Bourman	–
Independent (2)	–	–	2: Moira Deeming; Adem Somyurek
Total	33	4	3

== Ticket voting in the South Australian House of Assembly ==
GVTs and "above the line" voting have been used for upper house elections in the jurisdictions described above. In the lower house of most Australian states and the Australian House of Representatives, full preferential instant-runoff (preferential) voting is used to elect a single representative for an electorate. Voters are instructed to put a number in every square, and if they neglect to do so, their vote is informal. A substantial proportion of informal votes have a number 1, tick or cross in a single box.

In elections for the lower house of South Australian Parliament, the South Australian House of Assembly, the instructions on the ballot paper advise voters to complete every square. But there is a savings provision where one or some squares have been completed, but not all of them. Parties can submit preference tickets for each electorate to the Electoral Commission of South Australia. Where only one square has been completed indicating a vote for a particular party, that party's ticket is used instead of the vote becoming informal. Similarly, but much more rarely, if a voter completes several but not all squares, and their votes match those of a party's ticket, the ticket will be used to complete the remainder of the squares.

It is illegal for parties to promote "Just Vote 1" or the like - the measure is only intended to avoid an informal vote where the voter's intention is clear.

== See also ==
- Straight-ticket voting, a similar mechanism for single-winner FPTP elections in the United States
- Spare vote, a list-based method of STV in which party lists are ranked to overcome a threshold in a legislative body
