= Simon Ramsay =

Simon Ramsay may refer to:

- Simon Ramsay, 16th Earl of Dalhousie (1914–1999), statesman
- Simon Ramsay (politician), Australian politician
