= David Koch (disambiguation) =

David Koch (1940–2019) was a United States businessman and 1980 U.S. Libertarian Party vice presidential candidate.

David Koch may also refer to:

- David Koch (television presenter) (born 1956), Australian television personality
- David Koch (Australian politician) (born 1949), Australian Liberal member of the Victorian Legislative Council
