= How-to-vote card =

Handed-out leaflets in Australian elections with voting instructions

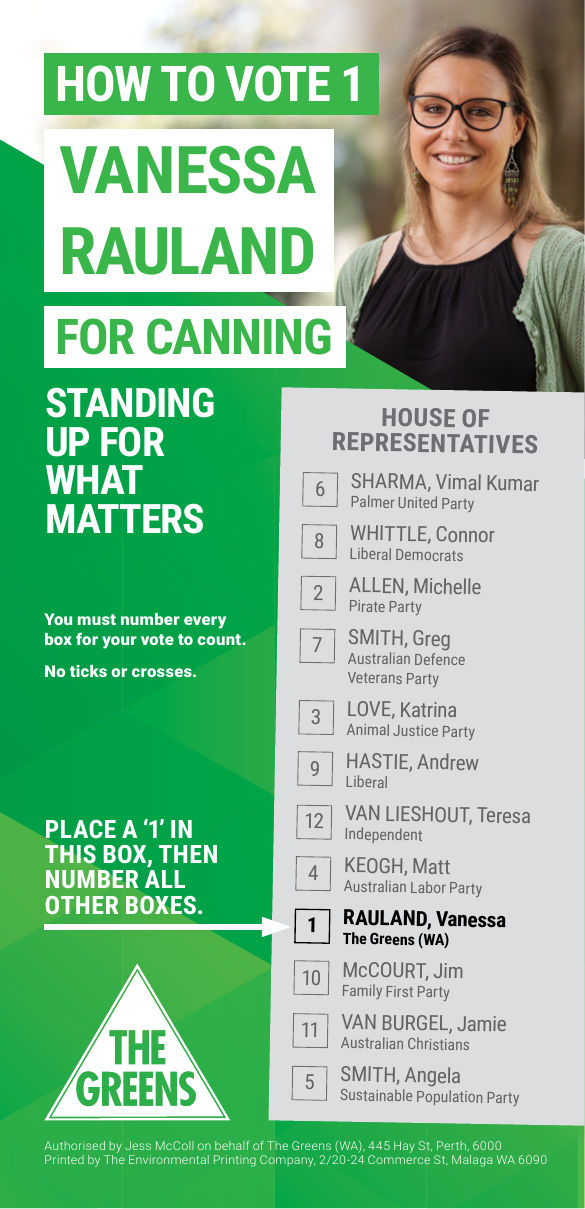
A how-to-vote card from the 2015 Canning by-election, produced by the Australian Greens.

In Australia, how-to-vote cards (HTV) are small leaflets that are handed out by party supporters during elections. Voting in the Australian lower house uses a preferential voting system. Voters must rank every candidate on the ballot in order for their vote to count. There are often numerous candidates on the ballot, some with little public profile, so voters may find it difficult to decide on all of them. Parties produce how-to-vote cards ostensibly to help voters. They contain details about the candidate or party, as well as instruction on how to cast a ranked vote in the order that the party would prefer the voter follow. The flow of preferences can assist the party dispersing the cards directly and indirectly help allied parties.

The use of HTV cards have benefited minor parties in a number of ways including increasing their chances of winning, punishing opponents and receiving policy commitments. Sometimes "preference deals" are done between political parties so that they are favoured by each other's HTV cards.

Voters are under no obligation to follow the cards.

== Examples ==
=== Federal ===
Below is an example of a federal how-to-vote card's preferences, showing the preferences given by the Liberal candidate for Gilmore (Andrew Constance) in 2022 for the House of Representatives (Lower House):

#	Party	Candidate
1	Liberal	CONSTANCE, Andrew
5	Independent	DIGIGLIO, Nina
7	Greens	MCCALLUM, Carmel
2	United Australia	MALONEY, Jordan
4	One Nation	EID, Jeremy
3	Liberal Democrats	FADINI, Adrian
6	Labor	PHILLIPS, Fiona

In a federal election, voters need to number every box on the Lower House ballot paper. On the Senate (Upper House) ballot paper, at least six boxes must be numbered above-the-line or at least 12 must be numbered below-the-line. So, how-to-vote cards are numbered as such. As shown above in the Gilmore how-to-vote card, Constance showed his first preference in his own box (all how-to-vote cards give their party's candidate their first preference). Then, the minor right-wing parties are given his second, third and fourth preferences, as they are most likely to support a Coalition government in the event of a hung parliament. Then, he places the independent candidate fifth. Independents can hold a variety of views, but in this case the independent holds anti-vaccine views and was formerly a member of the Greens. Finally, he places the left-leaning parties last (Labor sixth and the Greens seventh). This is because there are two major political parties that can realistically form government in Australia: Labor and the Coalition. Therefore, the major parties avoid preferencing each other anywhere but at the bottom. Then, the Greens (which in hung parliaments support Labor) are placed last. This is because the Coalition are outspoken critics of the Greens and their policies.

=== New South Wales ===
New South Wales uses optional preferential voting (OPV) for the Legislative Assembly (Lower House). This means that voters only need to number one box on the Lower House ballot paper, but may choose to number more. Therefore, several parties (including the Coalition) only show one box numbered. Below is an example of a Coalition how-to-vote card that numbers only one box, showing the how-to-vote card for the Nationals candidate for Lismore (Alex Rubin) in 2023:

#	Party	Candidate
	Shooters, Fishers, Farmers	BERTALLI, Matthew
	Labor	SAFFIN, Janelle
	Independent	McKENZIE, James
	Animal Justice	ROSAYRO, Vanessa
	Sustainable Australia	HONNIBALL, Ross
	Greens	GUISE, Adam
1	National	RUBIN, Alex

== Preference deals ==
A major political strategy during Australian political campaigns are preference deals, which direct voters to preference candidates in a specific and desirable order.

These deals have a large impact especially in seats where voters select minor parties or independents above the major parties.

For example, in the 2019 election over a quarter of voters preferenced a minor party or an independent candidate first on their ballots. In the 2019 federal election, 82.2% of Greens voter preferences went to the Labor party, while the Coalition received about 65% of One Nation and United Australia Party voter preferences.

It is typical for the Greens to recommend their voters preference the ALP over the Coalition. In the 2022 federal election, the United Australia Party recommended preference to the Coalition in various marginal seats, increasing the likelihood of the Coalition winning in these seats.

Since the 1960s, reliance on how-to-vote cards has decreased, with less than 30% of voters reporting using them in their decision.

== Controversies ==
How-to-vote cards have become quite controversial in elections, especially federal elections.

=== 2022 ===
Senator Pauline Hanson, who is the leader of the right-wing One Nation party (which typically preferences the Coalition over Labor and puts the Greens last), announced that the party would preference Labor ahead of the Liberals in five seats, all of which were held by members of the Moderate faction, in response to the Liberal Party preferencing the Jacqui Lambie Network over One Nation in Tasmania. The electorates in question were Bass (Tasmania), Goldstein (Victoria), North Sydney (New South Wales) and Sturt (South Australia). Hanson also announced that she would preference against independent Helen Haines in the Victorian seat of Indi. However, the Liberals did benefit from One Nation's preferences in the Liberal-held seat of Braddon in Tasmania, which was previously a marginal seat (but in 2022 became a "fairly safe" seat). Hanson also assured that the party would still preference Liberal candidates in most other seats, as well as candidates from the other branches of the Coalition (i.e. the Nationals in rural electorates, the Liberal Nationals in Queensland and the Country Liberals in the Northern Territory).

== Regional differences ==
=== New South Wales ===
For state elections, New South Wales uses optional preferential voting. This means that voters only need to number one candidate on the Lower House ballot, but can choose to number more candidates. This also means that voters are not required to number any candidates below-the-line on the Upper House ballot paper. Because of this, many how-to-vote cards for state elections only ask voters to number one candidate.

At the 2023 state election, the Liberal Party's how-to-vote cards generally only had one box numbered for the Lower House, as well as two above-the-line and none below-the-line for the Upper House. In the Upper House, the party gave their second preference to the Liberal Democrats. As the Liberal and National parties form the Coalition both federally and in many states (including New South Wales), candidates from each party direct preferences to each other if both parties are contesting in the same electorate. In 2023, this scenario (which rarely occurs in New South Wales) happened in two electorates: Port Macquarie and Wagga Wagga. In Port Macquarie, the two parties directed their second preferences to the other party and numbered no other candidates on the Lower House ballot paper in Port Macquarie. However, in Wagga Wagga, both parties directed their second preferences to the other Coalition party and their third preferences to independent Joe McGirr, but numbered no other candidates. Statewide, both parties contest the Upper House on the same ticket.

The Labor Party's preferences on how-to-vote cards vary, with some candidates choosing to number just one box on the Lower House ballot paper (and one above-the-line on the Upper House ballot paper) and others choosing to number more than one candidate for the Lower House and up to four parties above-the-line for the Upper House. However, in 2023, all Labor candidates that numbered more than one candidate on their Upper House ballot paper numbered the Liberal Party last.

In 2023, One Nation's how-to-vote cards instructed voters to only number one box on each ballot paper (and none below-the-line in the Upper House).

=== South Australia ===
In South Australia, a combined HTV card is displayed in the polling booths and early voting centres. Apart from saving paper, these combined HTVs are helpful for candidates who do not have the resources in manpower or funding to man every booth.

A how-to-vote card lodged with the Electoral Commission of South Australia for display in polling booths and early voting centres. These HTV cards are edited for size and do not display images or icons.

=== Victoria ===
In Victoria, HTV cards must be authorised by the Victorian Electoral Commission and meet certain regulations before they can be handed out on election day. Once the HTV card has been approved it can be handed out by the VEC employees in mobile hospital units and other non-regular booths. These cards are also archived by the VEC on their website.

=== General ===
- Depending on jurisdiction, ballots show party names.
- Depending on jurisdiction, ballots may show a party icon, say 32 x 32 pixels.
