= Mary-Anne Thomas =

Australian politician

The Honourable Mary-Anne Thomas MP

Minister for Women
- In office 18 December 2025 – 15 April 2026
- Premier: Jacinta Allan
- Preceded by: Natalie Hutchins
- Succeeded by: Gabrielle Williams (as Minister for Women and Girls)

Leader of the House
- In office 5 December 2022 – 15 April 2026
- Premier: Daniel Andrews; Jacinta Allan
- Preceded by: Lizzie Blandthorn
- Succeeded by: Anthony Carbines

Minister for Health Infrastructure
- In office 5 December 2022 – 19 December 2024
- Premier: Daniel Andrews; Jacinta Allan
- Preceded by: Position created
- Succeeded by: Melissa Horne

Minister for Medical Research
- In office 5 December 2022 – 2 October 2023
- Premier: Daniel Andrews; Jacinta Allan
- Preceded by: Jaala Pulford (as Minister for Innovation, Medical Research and the Digital Economy)
- Succeeded by: Ben Carroll

Minister for Health
- In office 27 June 2022 – 13 April 2026
- Premier: Daniel Andrews; Jacinta Allan
- Preceded by: Martin Foley
- Succeeded by: Harriet Shing

Minister for Ambulance Services
- In office 2 October 2023 – 13 April 2026
- Premier: Jacinta Allan
- Preceded by: Gabrielle Williams
- Succeeded by: Harriet Shing
- In office 27 June 2022 – 5 December 2022
- Premier: Daniel Andrews
- Preceded by: Martin Foley
- Succeeded by: Gabrielle Williams

Minister for Regional Development
- In office 22 December 2020 – 27 June 2022
- Premier: Daniel Andrews
- Preceded by: Jaclyn Symes
- Succeeded by: Harriet Shing

Minister for Agriculture
- In office 22 December 2020 – 27 June 2022
- Premier: Daniel Andrews
- Preceded by: Jaclyn Symes
- Succeeded by: Gayle Tierney

Member of the Victorian Legislative Assembly for Macedon
- Incumbent
- Assumed office 29 November 2014
- Preceded by: Joanne Duncan

Personal details
- Born: 26 February 1963 (age 63)
- Party: Labor Party
- Website: www.mary-annethomas.com.au

Mary-Anne Thomas (born 26 February 1963) is an Australian politician. She has been a Labor Party member of the Victorian Legislative Assembly since November 2014, representing the electorate of Macedon. She has served as Victoria's Minister for Health and Minister for Ambulance Services since June 2022. She was previously the Agriculture and Minister for Regional Development from December 2020.

== Education and early career ==
Thomas studied at Wodonga High School, and completed a teaching degree at the Melbourne College of Advanced Education. She holds a Graduate Diploma in Industrial Relations from Victoria University and a Masters of Public Policy from the University of Melbourne.

She worked for 25 years across public, private and community sectors. She began her career as a secondary teacher, then worked in the union movement before becoming an advisor to Lynne Kosky, the Minister for Post-Compulsory Education, Employment and Training. She has also held roles in the Victorian public service in Education, and the Department of Premier and Cabinet, where she was Head of Communications.

Prior to entering Parliament, she held senior roles at the National Australia Bank and Plan International, one of the world's leading child rights and international development agencies.

== Political career ==
Thomas was elected to the Victorian Legislative Assembly as the Member for Macedon in November 2014. She had previously contested Labor pre-selection for the Federal seat of Batman, but lost to then Senator David Feeney.

She was appointed Minister for Agriculture and Minister for Regional Development in the Andrews Labor Government in December 2020, having previously served as the Parliamentary Secretary for Health & Carers. In June 2022, she was appointed as Minister for Health and Minister for Ambulance Services.

=== Electoral history ===
Electoral history of Mary-Anne Thomas in the Parliament of Victoria
Year	Electorate	Party	First Preference Result				Two Candidate Result			
Year	Electorate	Party	Votes	%	+%	Position	Votes	%	+%	Result
2014	Macedon	Labor	16,376	43.1	+0.5	1st	20,417	53.8	+1.4	Elected
2018	Macedon	Labor	19,251	47.97	+9.30	1st	25,384	63.18	+9.40	Elected
2022	Macedon	Labor	17,234	41.4	−6.6	1st	24,762	59.5	−3.8	Elected

Victorian Legislative Assembly
Preceded by Joanne Duncan	Member for Macedon; 2014–present	Incumbent
Political offices
Preceded by Jaclyn Symes	Minister for Regional Development; 2020–2022	Succeeded by Harriet Shing
Preceded by Jaclyn Symes	Minister for Agriculture; 2020–2022	Succeeded by Gayle Tierney
Preceded by Martin Foley	Minister for Health; 2022–present	Incumbent
Preceded by Martin Foley	Minister for Health; Minister for Ambulance Services; 2022–present	Incumbent
