= Western Victoria Region =

Electoral region of the Victorian Legislative Council

Western Victoria Region Victoria—Legislative Council
- Interactive map of electoral region boundaries from the 2022 state election, along with its composition of electoral districts
- State: Victoria
- Created: 2006
- MP: Jacinta Ermacora (Labor); Sarah Mansfield (Greens); Bev McArthur (Liberal); Joe McCracken (Liberal); Gayle Tierney (Labor)
- Party: Labor (2); Liberal (2); Greens (1)
- Electors: 571,121 (2022)
- Area: 77,776 km^{2} (30,029.5 sq mi)
- Coordinates: 37°11′S 142°50′E

Western Victoria Region is one of the eight electoral regions of Victoria, Australia, which elects five members to the Victorian Legislative Council (also referred to as the upper house) by proportional representation. The region was created in 2006 following the 2005 reform of the Victorian Legislative Council.

The region comprises the Legislative Assembly districts of Bellarine, Eureka, Geelong, Lara, Lowan, Melton, Polwarth, Ripon, South Barwon, South-West Coast and Wendouree.

== Members ==
Members for Western Victoria Region
Year	Member	Party	Member	Party	Member	Party	Member	Party	Member	Party
2006	Jaala Pulford	Labor	Gayle Tierney	Labor	Peter Kavanagh	Democratic Labour	John Vogels	Liberal	David Koch	Liberal
2010	Jaala Pulford	Labor	Gayle Tierney	Labor	David O'Brien	Nationals	Simon Ramsay	Liberal	David Koch	Liberal
2014	Jaala Pulford	Labor	Gayle Tierney	Labor	James Purcell	Local Jobs	Simon Ramsay	Liberal	Josh Morris	Liberal
2018	Jaala Pulford	Labor	Gayle Tierney	Labor	Andy Meddick	Animal Justice	Stuart Grimley	Justice	Bev McArthur	Liberal
2022	Jacinta Ermacora	Labor	Gayle Tierney	Labor	Sarah Mansfield	Greens	Joe McCracken	Liberal	Bev McArthur	Liberal

== Returned MLCs by seat ==
Seats are allocated by single transferable vote using group voting tickets. Changes in party membership between elections have been omitted for simplicity.

Election	1st MLC	2nd MLC	3rd MLC	4th MLC	5th MLC
2006	Labor (Jaala Pulford)	Liberal (John Vogels)	Labor (Gayle Tierney)	Liberal (David Koch)	Democratic Labour (Peter Kavanagh)
2010	Liberal (David Koch)	Labor (Jaala Pulford)	Liberal (Simon Ramsay)	Labor (Gayle Tierney)	Nationals (David O'Brien)
2014	Liberal (Simon Ramsay)	Labor (Jaala Pulford)	Liberal (Josh Morris)	Labor (Gayle Tierney)	Local Jobs (James Purcell)
2018	Labor (Jaala Pulford)	Liberal (Bev McArthur)	Labor (Gayle Tierney)	Justice (Stuart Grimley)	Animal Justice (Andy Meddick)
2022	Labor (Jacinta Ermacora)	Liberal (Bev McArthur)	Labor (Gayle Tierney)	Greens (Sarah Mansfield)	Liberal (Joe McCracken)

== Election results ==
Labor were defending two seats. The Liberal Party, Derryn Hinch's Justice Party, and the Animal Justice Party were defending one seat each.

2022 Victorian state election: Western Victoria
Party	Candidate	Votes	%	±%
Quota		82,036		
Labor	1. Jacinta Ermacora (elected 1); 2. Gayle Tierney (elected 3); 3. Megan Bridger-Darling; 4. Sue Pavlovich; 5. Heather Stokes	175,024	35.56	−2.66
Liberal/National Coalition	1. Bev McArthur (elected 2); 2. Joe McCracken (elected 5); 3. Anita Rank; 4. Angela Shearman; 5. Robert Letts	133,231	27.07	−2.80
Greens	1. Sarah Mansfield (elected 4); 2. John Barnes; 3. Judith Baldacchino; 4. Eva van der Vlies; 5. Linda Zibell	42,709	8.68	+1.18
Legalise Cannabis	1. Andrew Dowling; 2. Melanie Humphrey	24,763	5.03	+5.03
Shooters, Fishers, Farmers	1. Ben Collyer; 2. Graeme Standen	18,460	3.78	−0.67
Liberal Democrats	1. Julia McGrath; 2. Paul Barker	16,471	3.35	+0.71
One Nation	1. Terri Elizabeth Pryse-Smith; 2. Sabine De Pyle	13,065	2.65	+2.65
Democratic Labour	1. Costa Di Biase; 2. Ron Skrunzy	10,696	2.17	+0.60
Family First	1. Dean Conkwright; 2. Chioma Ikeh	10,320	2.10	+2.10
Justice	1. Stuart Grimley; 2. Simone O'Brien	8,697	1.77	−2.69
Animal Justice	1. Andy Meddick; 2. Hannah Wilshier	8,660	1.76	−1.01
Sack Dan Andrews	1. Tosh-Jake Finnigan; 2. Ismail Efe Celikdogen; 3. Sinan Orhan	5,012	1.02	+1.02
Victorian Socialists	1. Madilyn Gorman; 2. Abbey Randall	3,656	0.74	+0.00
United Australia	1. Natalie Valerie Failla; 2. Keith Raymond	3,620	0.73	+0.73
Reason	1. Emma Sinclair; 2. Olivia Hurley	3,475	0.71	−0.21
Angry Victorians	1. Chris Burson; 2. Richard Beeck	2,699	0.55	+0.55
Health Australia	1. Constantine Lazos; 2. Angelica Brennfleck	2,607	0.53	−0.20
Companions and Pets	1. Geoff Collins; 2. Simone Fisher	2,544	0.52	+0.52
Freedom	1. Antun Kovac; 2. Flor Vanessa Becerra-Kovac	2,307	0.47	+0.47
Sustainable Australia	1. Madeleine Wearne; 2. Robert Pascoe	2,083	0.42	−0.21
Transport Matters	1. Antonela Kearns; 2. Eddie Dunn	1,457	0.30	−0.23
New Democrats	1. Cecilia Gomez Benitez; 2. Vijaykumar Kachhia; 3. Hardik Bipinchandra Dave; 4. Jaymik Mahendrakumar Patel	541	0.11	+0.11
Ind. (Indigenous)	1. Storm Hellmuth	161	0.03	+0.03
Total formal votes		464,784	96.62	+0.75
Informal votes		14,734	3.38	−0.75
Turnout		509,387	89.20	−2.24
