= John Vogels =

Australian politician

John Vogels AM

Member of the Victorian Legislative Assembly for Warrnambool
- In office 18 September 1999 – 29 November 2002
- Preceded by: John McGrath
- Succeeded by: District abolished

Member of the Victorian Legislative Council
- In office 30 November 2002 – 24 November 2006
- Constituency: Western Province
- In office 25 November 2006 – 26 November 2010
- Constituency: Western Victoria Region

Personal details
- Born: 14 June 1946 (age 79) Netherlands
- Party: Liberal Party
- Occupation: Dairy farmer

John Adrian Vogels AM (born 14 June 1946, in the Netherlands) has been the Chairman of Wannon Water, a regional Water Authority in Victoria Australia, since 2011. He was an Australian politician. He was a Liberal member of the Victorian Parliament from 1999 to 2010, serving in both the Legislative Assembly and the Legislative Council.

Vogels attended Noorat Public School 1956–61 and St Thomas' School in Terang 1961–64. In 1970, he became a dairy farmer. In 1996 he was elected to Corangamite Shire Council, becoming Mayor in 1998. In 1997, he joined the Liberal Party.

In 1999, Vogels was preselected as the Liberal candidate for Warrnambool, a National Party seat. He was elected, and subsequently stood down as Mayor of Corangamite Shire, ceasing to be a councillor in 2000. His seat was abolished in 2002, and he transferred to the Legislative Council, representing Western Province. When the Legislative Council was reformed in 2006, he became the top Liberal candidate for Western Victoria Region, and as such was easily elected. He was Shadow Minister for Local Government and Victorian Communities from 2004 to 2006 and Shadow Minister for Agriculture from December 2006 until February 2008. He retired from politics in 2010.

Victorian Legislative Assembly
Preceded by John McGrath	Member for Warrnambool; 1999–2002	District abolished

Victorian Legislative Council
Preceded by Bruce Chamberlain	Member for Western; 2002–2006; Served alongside: David Koch	Province abolished
New seat	Member for Western Victoria Region; 2006–2010; Served alongside: Jaala Pulford, Gayle Tierney, David Koch	Succeeded by Simon Ramsay
