= Andy Meddick =

Australian politician

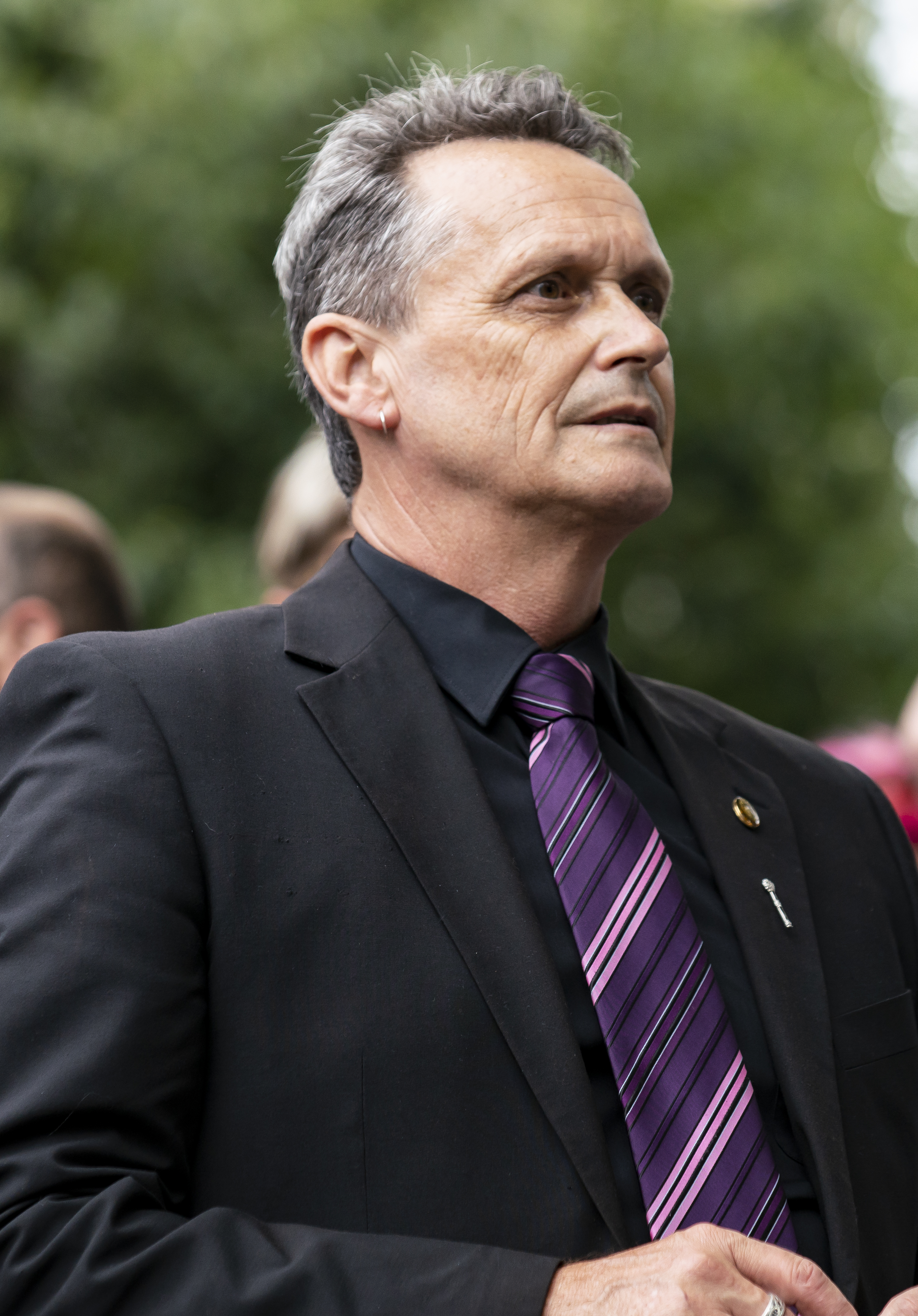
- Meddick in 2022

Member of the Victorian Legislative Council for Western Victoria Region
- In office 24 November 2018 – 26 November 2022
- Preceded by: James Purcell
- Succeeded by: Sarah Mansfield

Personal details
- Born: 5 April 1964 (age 62) Gosford, New South Wales, Australia
- Party: Australian Democrats
- Other political affiliations: Animal Justice Party (formerly)
- Occupation: Crane Operator; Politician

Andy Meddick (born 5 April 1964) is a former Australian politician. He was an Animal Justice Party member of the Victorian Legislative Council from 2018 to 2022, representing Western Victoria Region, and was the first politician elected in Victoria on an animal protection platform.

== Career ==
Meddick previously worked in construction and was motivated to start his political career when he heard the screams of animals while he worked next to a Laverton pig slaughterhouse in 2013. Meddick began handing out how-to-vote cards for the Animal Justice Party before the 2013 federal election and formed the regional group of the AJP. He contested the federal seat of Corangamite in 2016.

== Political views ==
Meddick has been a strong critic of duck hunting in Victoria. He stated in his maiden speech in 2019 that he wants to work with farmers: "to help them adapt to the changes that our climate emergency will force us all to make". He also supported other members of the Victorian parliament crossbench in calling for a trial for pill testing.

Meddick has opposed the culling of kangaroos, instead demanding in parliament that pest populations be 'relocated.'

According to The Age, between November 2018 and November 2021, Meddick voted with the Andrews Government's position 83.2% of the time, the most of any Legislative Council crossbencher.

== Personal life ==
Meddick is the father of two transgender children.
