= Shane McKenzie =

Australian bobsledder

Shane McKenzie (born 1973) is an Australian bobsleigh athlete. He represented Australia at the Winter Olympics in 2006.

== Life and career ==
McKenzie was born in 1973 in Adelaide. He first started bobsleigh in 2003 when he was recruited by top Australian professional sprinter, Robin Calleja who encouraged McKenzie to join him on the European Circuit.

After he was runner-up in the Under 20 Australian 100 m title, McKenzie represented Australia at the 1992 World Junior Athletics Championships in Seoul, South Korea.

He has been a professional sprinter competing regularly in South Australian Athletic League, Victorian Athletic League, Tasmanian Athletic League and New South Wales Athletic League events.

McKenzie is a 4 time finalist (including twice runner-up to Australian sprint champions & Stawell Gift winners - Dean Capobianco & Steve Brimacombe) in the prestigious Bay Sheffield 120m Gift. The Bay Sheffield is held at Glenelg, South Australia, each year on 28 December.

Among his other successes are the Bay Sheffield backmarker's invitation 120m (twice); the Bendigo 120m Gift, the 2001 Mount Gambier 120m Gift and during the 1990s he was the South Australian 100m & 200m sprint champion.

In December 2007, McKenzie was one of 12 inaugural inductees into the South Australian Athletic League Bay Sheffield Hall of Fame.
