= Jaclyn Symes =

Australian politician

The Honourable Jaclyn Symes MLC
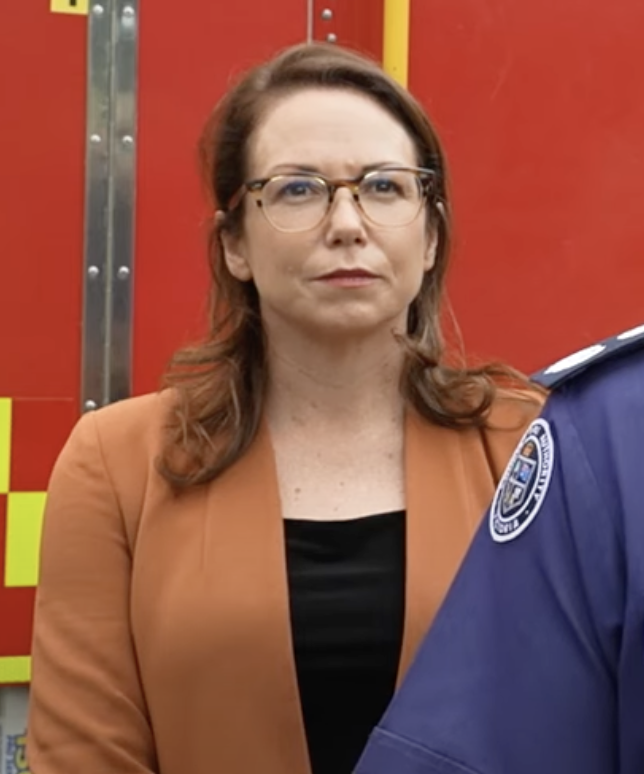

Leader of the Government in the Legislative Council
- Incumbent
- Assumed office 23 March 2020
- Premier: Daniel Andrews; Jacinta Allan; Ben Carroll
- Preceded by: Gavin Jennings

Minister for Energy and Resources Minister for Climate Action Minister for the State Electricity Commission Minister for the Environment
- Incumbent
- Assumed office 4 August 2026
- Premier: Ben Carroll
- Preceded by: Lily D'Ambrosio

Treasurer of Victoria
- In office 19 December 2024 – 4 August 2026
- Premier: Jacinta Allan
- Preceded by: Tim Pallas
- Succeeded by: Colin Brooks
Previous ministerial offices
Minister for Development Victoria and Precincts
In office 15 April 2026 – 4 August 2026
Premier	Jacinta Allan
Preceded by	Harriet Shing
Succeeded by	Position abolished
Minister for Regional Development
In office 19 December 2024 – 15 April 2026
Premier	Jacinta Allan
Preceded by	Gayle Tierney
Succeeded by	Michaela Settle
Minister for Emergency Services
In office 23 August 2021 – 19 December 2024
Premier	Daniel Andrews; Jacinta Allan
Preceded by	Lisa Neville
Succeeded by	Vicki Ward
55th Attorney-General of Victoria
In office 22 December 2020 – 19 December 2024
Premier	Daniel Andrews; Jacinta Allan
Preceded by	Jill Hennessy
Succeeded by	Sonya Kilkenny
Minister for Regional Development
In office 29 November 2018 – 22 December 2020
Premier	Daniel Andrews
Preceded by	Jaala Pulford
Succeeded by	Mary-Anne Thomas
Minister for Resources
In office 29 November 2018 – 23 August 2021
Premier	Daniel Andrews
Preceded by	Tim Pallas
Succeeded by	Jaala Pulford
Minister for Agriculture
In office 29 November 2018 – 22 December 2020
Premier	Daniel Andrews
Preceded by	Jaala Pulford
Succeeded by	Mary-Anne Thomas

Member of the Victorian Legislative Council for Northern Victoria Region
- Incumbent
- Assumed office 29 November 2014

Personal details
- Born: Jaclyn Symes Benalla, Victoria, Australia
- Party: Labor Party
- Education: Deakin University
- Website: www.jaclynsymes.com.au

Jaclyn Symes is an Australian politician. She is a Labor member of the Victorian Legislative Council, having represented Northern Victoria Region since 2014.

Symes worked for five years as a ministerial advisor for Rob Hulls, the Victorian Deputy Premier and Attorney-General. When the Labor Party lost government in 2010, Symes transferred to Hulls' electoral office. In 2011, she became pregnant and applied for maternity leave entitlements accrued during her employment with the Department of Premier and Cabinet, but was informed that as she was now employed by the Parliament of Victoria, she could not access the entitlement without dispensation from the Speaker of the Legislative Assembly. The Speaker, Ken Smith, declined the request, and the matter was referred to the Fair Work Commission by the Community and Public Sector Union. Premier Ted Baillieu intervened and referred the matter to the Public Sector Standards Commissioner to resolve any inconsistencies in the government's employment policies.

In November 2018, Symes was appointed as Minister for Agriculture, Minister for Regional Development and Minister for Resources. In March 2020, Symes became the Leader of the Government in the Legislative Council.

On 22 December 2020, Symes was appointed the new Attorney-General of Victoria, replacing Jill Hennessy, who had stepped down from the ministry to spend more time with her teenage daughters as they went through high school. In August 2021, Symes was appointed as Minister for Emergency Services but relinquished her resources portfolio.

Following the resignation of Tim Pallas in December 2024, Symes became the first female treasurer of Victoria on 19 December 2024, and became just the second treasurer in Victoria's history from the Legislative Council, after John Lenders.

Symes completed a Bachelor of Laws at Deakin University in 2002.

Symes is a member of the Australian Workers Union component of the Victorian Labor Right.

Political offices
Preceded by Jaala Pulford	Minister for Regional Development; 2018–2020	Succeeded by Mary-Anne Thomas
Preceded by Jaala Pulford	Minister for Agriculture; 2018–2020	Succeeded by Mary-Anne Thomas
Preceded by Tim Pallas	Minister for Resources; 2018–2021	Succeeded by Jaala Pulford
Preceded by Jill Hennessy	Attorney-General; 2020–2024	Succeeded by Sonya Kilkenny
Preceded by Lisa Neville	Minister for Emergency Services; 2021–2024	Succeeded by Vicki Ward
Preceded by Jaala Pulford	Minister for Regional Development; 2018–2020	Succeeded by Mary-Anne Thomas
Preceded by Gayle Tierney	Minister for Regional Development; 2024–present	Incumbent
Preceded by Tim Pallas	Treasurer of Victoria; 2024–present	Incumbent
