= David O'Brien (politician) =

Australian politician

Member of the Victorian Legislative Council for Western Victoria Region
- In office 27 November 2010 – 29 November 2014

Personal details
- Born: 2 September 1970 (age 56) Melbourne
- Party: National Party
- Education: Monash University
- Occupation: Barrister, hotelier, farmer, bass player

David Roland Joseph O'Brien (born 2 September 1970) is an Australian politician who represented the National Party in the Victorian Legislative Council.

== Early life and education ==
O'Brien was born in Melbourne and educated at Sacred Heart Primary School, and then overseas at Marion Donaldson Elementary School (in Tucson, Arizona), Rygaards International School (in Copenhagen, Denmark) and Hendrik Louw School (in Strand, South Africa). He returned to Melbourne where he attended Xavier College, then studied law and economics at Monash University.

== Legal career ==
Prior to being elected to Parliament, he practised as a Barrister at the Supreme Court of Victoria and as a solicitor at King & Wood Mallesons. O'Brien has also been the licensee of the Penshurst Hotel and involved in primary production and live music, being a bass player in local Melbourne bands Loin Groin, the Histrionics and Stubble.

David was involved as a supporter of Live Music in the “Save the Espy” Campaign in the late 1990s and early 2000s concerning the Esplanade Hotel in St. Kilda Victoria.

David Played Australian Rules Football with Monash Whites Football Club and Penshurst Football and Netball Club.

== Political career ==
O'Brien was elected to the Victorian Legislative Council as a Member for the Western Victoria Region at the 2010 election. Previously he was the unsuccessful Nationals candidate for the seat of South West Coast at the 2006 election. He is the only National to be elected to the upper house from Western Victoria since the changeover to the regional proportional representation system at the 2006 election.

O'Brien was the Deputy Leader of the Nationals in the Legislative Council, but lost his seat in 2014 to James Purcell, representing Vote 1 Local Jobs. Whilst in Parliament he served on the Scrutiny of Acts and Regulations Committee, the Public Accounts and Estimates Committee, the Family and Community Development Committee, the Accountability and Oversight Committee, the Legal and Social Issues Committee, the House Committee and in 2014 as chair of the Rural and Regional Committee.

David was a member of the Family and Community Development Committee's Inquiry into the Handling of Child Abuse by Religious and Other Organisations. Known as the Betrayal of Trust Inquiry, it uncovered shocking widespread and systemic abuse of children in multiple organisations dating back decades.

The Inquiry's 750-page report was tabled in November 2013 and recommended wide-sweeping legislative changes to both civil and criminal laws. The recommendations allowed victims to seek adequate compensation and recommended new criminal offences for those who turned a blind eye to sexual abuse. The inquiry was important in leading to legislative reforms which removed the statute of limitations on historical sexual abuse claims and was a catalyst for the Commonwealth Royal Commission into Institutional Responses to Child Sexual Abuse.

Prior to the 2014 election, O'Brien considered switching to the safe lower house seat of Lowan, which commentators views as a logical move to safeguard O'Brien's parliamentary career and position himself as a future party leader. However, it is believed that the move was blocked by then-deputy leader Peter Walsh, who preferred to see the seat filled by a woman.

In September 2015, O'Brien was pre-selected by the National Party to contest the Polwarth state by-election following the resignation of the Liberal MP Terry Mulder. He was unsuccessful.
