= Stuart Grimley =

Australian politician

Stuart Grimley MLC

Leader of Derryn Hinch's Justice Party in Victoria
- Incumbent
- Assumed office 2 July 2016

Member of the Victorian Legislative Council for Western Victoria Region
- In office 24 November 2018 – 26 November 2022

Personal details
- Born: 17 July 1970 (age 55) Elizabeth, South Australia
- Party: Derryn Hinch's Justice Party (until 2023)

Stuart James Grimley (born 17 July 1970) is a former Australian politician. He was a Justice Party member of the Victorian Legislative Council between 2018 and 2022, representing Western Victoria Region. He was not re-elected at the 2022 state election.

During his time in parliament, Grimley was the Victorian leader of the party.

Prior to his election to the Victorian Legislative Council, Grimley served as a police officer in Geelong.
