= Josh Morris (politician) =

Australian politician

Joshua Morris

Member of the Victorian Legislative Council for Western Victoria Region
- In office 29 November 2014 – 24 November 2018

Personal details
- Born: 27 October 1982 (age 43) Ballarat, Victoria, Australia
- Party: Liberal Party

Joshua William Morris (born 27 October 1982) is an Australian politician. He was a Liberal member of the Victorian Legislative Council, having represented Western Victoria Region from 2014 to 2018.

Morris was born in Ballarat, and studied at St Patrick's College, Ballarat, and the Australian Catholic University. A physical education teacher by profession, he was most recently teaching at Darley Primary School. He was elected to the Ballarat City Council in 2012, and served as mayor from 2013 to 2014, taking a leave of absence from his teaching job.

Morris was a late entry into the 2014 state election, only being preselected for the safe second position on the Liberal ticket for the Western Victoria Region of the Legislative Council in August 2014. Although his seat would be usually considered safe for the Liberal Party, he was defeated amidst the Liberal Party's landslide loss at the 2018 Victorian state election.
