= Peter Kavanagh (politician) =

Australian former politician

Peter Kavanagh MLC

Member of the Victorian Legislative Council for the Western Victoria Region
- In office 25 November 2006 – 27 November 2010
- Preceded by: New seat
- Succeeded by: David O'Brien

Personal details
- Born: Peter Damian Kavanagh; 1959 (age 66–67)
- Party: Democratic Labor Party
- Education: University of Melbourne, Mitchell College of Advanced Education
- Occupation: Politician, teacher, barrister, legal academic

Peter Damian Kavanagh (born 1959) is a former Australian politician, teacher, barrister and legal academic, who served as a member of the Victorian Legislative Council representing the Democratic Labor Party (DLP) from 2006 to 2010.

== Early life and education ==
Kavanagh was born into a family with a long connection with the DLP. His maternal grandfather, Bill Barry was a key player in the Australian Labor Party split that saw the creation of the original Democratic Labor Party: a party from which the current DLP has descended although is legally separate – to the extent the party was informally dubbed "Barry Labor" in its infancy.

Before entering parliament, Kavanagh attained credentials including Bachelor of Arts, Bachelor of Laws, Bachelor of Letters and Master of Arts (Asian Studies) degrees from the University of Melbourne, and a Diploma of Education from the Mitchell College of Advanced Education. He has worked as a barrister, law lecturer and teacher.

== Political career ==
At the 2006 Victorian election Kavanagh stood as the DLP's lead candidate in the newly formed Western Victoria Region, which elects five members via proportional representation. Despite winning only 2.6% of the vote, Kavanagh was able to win the final seat due to receiving preferences from both of the major parties. Kavanagh was not a local of the region, rather living in the Melbourne suburb of Essendon. However he did not see an issue with this, claiming that his views could be applicable to any location.

Kavanagh maintained he was attempting to use his share of the balance of power constructively, in particular encouraging the Government and Opposition to work towards and achieve agreement on some legislation. He was able to have the deciding vote on 20 upper house matters by August 2008, due to sharing the sole balance of power with the Greens. Because of his power in deciding matters, several Labor and Coalition MPs would try and forge personal relationships with him in the hopes of winning the deciding vote, in one instance having 20 comments on a plain yellow tie in a day.

Kavanagh led opposition within the Parliament to the decriminalisation of abortion under the Crimes Act in Victoria. In Parliament, Kavanagh proposed amendments to the Abortion Bill 2008 (including a requirement for pain relief for the fetus) which would have mitigated the legislation. In 2008 at the legislative council, he also made a three and a half-hour speech against the Abortion Bill.

In 2007, Kavanagh expressed a willingness to consider gay civil unions in Victoria "providing there is a special status retained for marriage".

Kavanagh was defeated at the Victorian state elections held on 29 November 2010. The DLP was again unrepresented in the Victorian parliament until the 2014 election when Rachel Carling-Jenkins won a Legislative Council seat for the DLP.
