= Evan Mulholland =

Australian politician

Evan Mulholland MLC
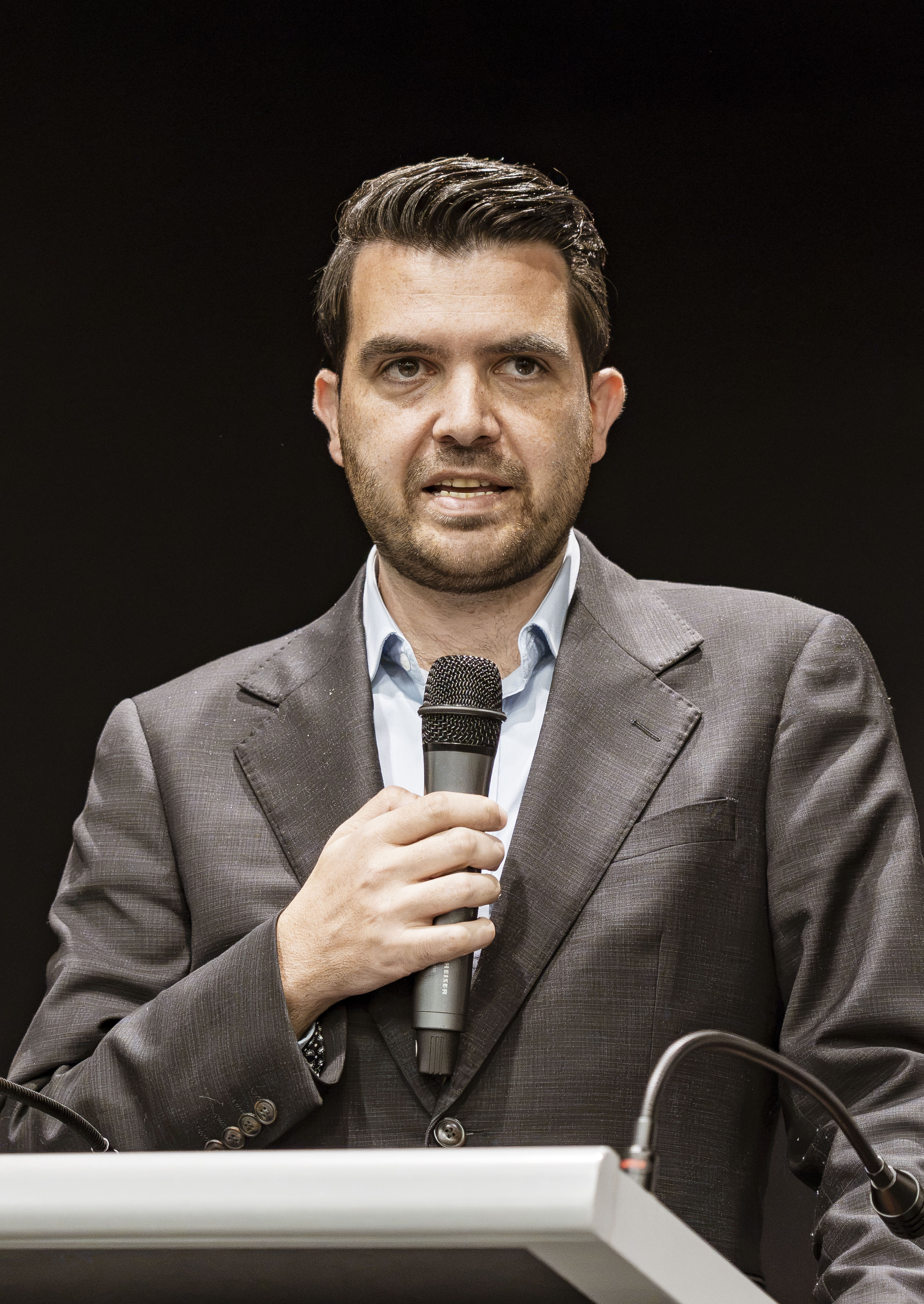
- Mulholland in 2026.

Deputy Leader of the Liberal Party in the Victorian Legislative Council
- Incumbent
- Assumed office 31 August 2023
- Leader: Georgie Crozier; David Davis; Bev McArthur
- Preceded by: Matt Bach

Member of the Victorian Legislative Council for Northern Metropolitan Region
- Incumbent
- Assumed office 26 November 2022

Personal details
- Party: Liberal
- Occupation: Politician

Evan Mulholland is an Australian politician. He has been a member of the Victorian Legislative Council, representing the Northern Metropolitan Region, since November 2022. Mulholland is a member of the Liberal Party.

Following his election at the 2022 state election, in December that year, he was immediately elevated to the position of Shadow Cabinet Secretary in John Pesutto's shadow cabinet. On 31 August 2023, he was elected as the deputy leader of the party in the Legislative Council. In October the same year, after a shadow cabinet reshuffle, he was appointed as Shadow Minister for Home Ownership and Housing Affordability, and Shadow Minister for Outer Suburban Growth.

Before entering parliament, Mulholland worked for the Institute of Public Affairs.
