= Bev McArthur =

Australian politician

Bev McArthur MLC
- McArthur in 2026

Leader of the Opposition in the Victorian Legislative Council
- Incumbent
- Assumed office 18 November 2025
- Deputy: Evan Mulholland
- Leader: Jess Wilson
- Preceded by: David Davis

Leader of the Liberal Party in the Victorian Legislative Council
- Incumbent
- Assumed office 18 November 2025
- Deputy: Evan Mulholland
- Leader: Jess Wilson
- Preceded by: David Davis

Member of the Victorian Legislative Council for Western Victoria Region
- Incumbent
- Assumed office 24 November 2018

Personal details
- Born: Beverley Murch; 10 September 1949 (age 77) Terang, Victoria
- Spouse: Stewart McArthur
- Website: www.bevmcarthur.com

Beverley McArthur (née Murch; born 10 September 1949) is an Australian politician. She has been a Liberal Party member of the Victorian Legislative Council since 2018, representing Western Victoria Region.

== Early life and education ==
McArthur was born in Terang and raised on a rural property near Tylden, attending Tylden Primary School and Clyde School at Mount Macedon. She moved to London for five years after finishing high school, before returning to Australia and commencing a social science degree at the Bendigo College of Advanced Education. She was a staffer for federal MP Stewart McArthur following his 1983 election, and married him in 1985. They later operated a beef farm near Camperdown for many years.

She joined the Liberal Party in her early twenties. She was the Bendigo federal electorate chairperson and was elected to the party's state administrative committee c. 1982. She unsuccessfully stood for the state presidency in 1992 after Michael Kroger's resignation, but was defeated by Ted Baillieu. She later served as a long-time country female state vice-president of the Liberal Party.

== Parliamentary career ==
Bev McArthur won Liberal preselection for the 2018 state election as a late replacement for Simon Ramsay, who abruptly retired due to drink-driving charges. She had previously been touted as a likely preselection candidate for the Australian Senate in 2019.

During her time in the Victorian Parliament, Bev McArthur has strongly advocated for increased hazard reduction burning on public land, in accordance with recommendations from the 2009 Victorian Bushfires Royal Commission. She is a proponent of the meat industry, fishing, hunting, duck shooting and horse racing.

In 2019, she warned against labelling climate change an 'emergency', likening the push to the boy who cried wolf and asking, "What happens when there is a genuine emergency like a terrorist attack, raging bush or urban fire, extreme weather events like cyclones and floods and power blackouts which threaten lives? Will anyone take notice of these emergencies?"

Bev McArthur has called for testing of the driving ability of foreign tourists, due to their involvement in 20% of crashes along the Great Ocean Road. In response, Premier Daniel Andrews labelled her comments "culturally inappropriate".

In 2021, she crossed the floor to vote against the Change or Suppression (Conversion) Practices Prohibition Bill 2020, which banned practices that intended to change individuals' sexual or gender identity. In her speech on the legislation, Mrs McArthur said:

This is not about electric shocks. This is about free individuals seeking advice on deeply personal matters that have irreversible and life-changing consequences. Individuals should be free to seek counselling, advice or care on any matter that they see fit without the interference of government.

She was opposed to the Voice to Parliament.

In May 2023 McArthur said Indigenous people should be grateful for the “wonderful things that have been enabled via colonisation” such as hospitals, running water and electricity.

Later in 2023 McArthur fell asleep in the Legislative Council chamber during an inauguration ceremony for the state’s governor.

In December 2024, McArthur ran in the 2024 Victorian Liberal Party Legislative Council deputy leadership spill, She lost by two votes. She ran against Evan Mulholland. McArthur ran again after the 2025 Victorian Liberal Party leadership spill and became Leader of the Opposition in the upper house in late 2025.

In 2026, the Herald Sun reported that McArthur billed taxpayers $7722 for premium economy seats to London, after which she held just four meetings over two days and then spent 15 days on a luxury cruise around the North Pole.

McArthur has been described as a political and factional powerbroker within the Liberal Party. In March 2026, McArthur again won preselection to be the top Liberal candidate on the party’s Western Victoria ticket for the 2026 election..
