= Democratic Labour Party (Australia, 1978) =

Democratic Labour Party Labour DLP
- Abbreviation: DLP; Labour DLP
- Federal Secretary: Richard Howard
- Founded: March 1978; 48 years ago
- Preceded by: Democratic Labor Party (1955)
- Headquarters: Canberra, Australian Capital Territory, Australia
- Ideology: Distributism; Social conservatism; Traditionalist conservatism
- Political position: Right-wing
- Colours: Gold Navy

Website
- dlp.net.au

The Democratic Labour Party (Note: Founded as the Democratic Labor Party. In 2013, the party changed its name to reflect the standard Australian English spelling of "labour".) (DLP) is an Australian political party founded in 1978. It traces its origins to an earlier DLP, which broke off from the Australian Labor Party (ALP) in 1955 as a result of that year's party split. When many members re-joined the ALP after the 1977 resignation of Labor leader Gough Whitlam, the original DLP dissolved the following year. A successor party of the same name was then founded by some members of the original.

The DLP had no parliamentary representation for a period of 28 years from 1978 to 2006. DLP candidates were then elected to the Victorian Legislative Council in 2006, 2014 and 2022, and a single senator was elected in 2010, with a platform focused more on social conservatism.

In March 2022, after the Australian Electoral Act was amended to raise the minimum number of members required for federal registration of a party from 500 to 1500, the DLP was federally de-registered by the Australian Electoral Commission.

The party remains registered for territorial elections in the Australian Capital Territory and since December 2024 re-registered in Victoria.

== History ==
=== Original DLP ===
The Australian Labor Party (Anti-Communist) was formed as a result of a split in the Australian Labor Party (ALP) which began in 1954. The split was between the party's national leadership, under the then party leader Dr H. V. Evatt, and the majority of the Victorian branch, which was dominated by a faction composed largely of ideologically driven anti-Communist Catholics. Many ALP members during the Cold War period, most but not all of them Catholics, became alarmed at what they saw as the growing power of the Communist Party of Australia within the country's trade unions. These members formed units within the unions, called Industrial Groups, to combat this alleged infiltration.

The party renamed itself the Democratic Labor Party in 1957. Its policies were traditional Labor ones, such as more spending on health, education and pensions, but combined with strident opposition to communism, and a greater emphasis on defence spending.

=== DLP disbands, new party formed ===
Following the departure of Whitlam from ALP leadership in 1977, recognising that the split had assisted the rise of the Whitlamite faction in the ALP, many DLP members rejoined the ALP. That greatly strengthened its right wing faction and helped the moderate Bob Hawke to take control of the ALP a few years later.

By 1978, DLP branches in all states other than Victoria had ceased to operate. In March 1978, the Victorian branch voted to dissolve The vote to dissolve was purportedly carried by 110 votes to 100. However, some members of the party disputed the validity of the vote and formed a continuing DLP, which sought to continue the policies and objectives of the original DLP.

The party continued to contest elections after the vote to dissolve, with the DLP candidate recording six percent of the vote at a June 1978 Victorian Legislative Council by-election for North Eastern Province. The re-established DLP contested its first Victorian state election in 1979.

=== 2006 Victorian state election ===
At the 2006 Victorian state election, the DLP won parliamentary representation for the first time since the 1970s when it won a seat in the Victorian Legislative Council, after fielding candidates in the eight regions of the reformed Council, in which proportional representation gave the party the best chance of having members elected. The DLP received 2.7 per cent of the primary vote in the Western Victoria Region, enough to elect Peter Kavanagh on ALP preferences. The party briefly looked set to have a second member elected, with party leader John Mulholland, in the Northern Metropolitan Region on 5.1 per cent, but that result was overturned after a recount. Following the election of Kavanagh, attention was given to the DLP platform of opposition to abortion and poker machines.

The Labor government required an additional two non-ALP upper house members to pass legislation, which gave the DLP the balance of power with the Greens, who held three seats. Kavanagh failed to retain his seat at the 2010 Victorian election.

In late August 2009, Melbourne newspaper The Age reported that the DLP was facing several internal divisions between Kavanagh's faction, which also sought to include evangelical and fundamentalist Protestants within the party, and 'hardline' conservative Catholics. Right to Life Australia President, Marcel White, and a close associate, Peter McBroom, were reported to be emphasising Catholic doctrinal and devotional concerns, like Marian apparitions, Catholic prayer, praying the rosary, and campaigns against the "evils of contraception". Kavanagh was reported as threatening to leave the organisation if the "hardline" elements were to triumph within the Victorian DLP. Ultimately, the minority "hardline" group was expelled from the party and it returned to its former non-sectarian position.

=== 2010 federal election ===
Shortly after counting began after the 2010 federal election, DLP candidate, federal DLP vice-president, and state DLP president John Madigan looked likely to be elected as the sixth and final Senator for Victoria, which was confirmed a few weeks later. Preference counts indicated that the primary DLP vote of 2.33 per cent (75,145 votes) in Victoria reached the 14.3 per cent quota required by gaining One Nation, Christian Democratic and Building Australia preferences to edge out Steve Fielding of the Family First Party who received a primary vote of 2.64 per cent. The DLP received Family First preferences, and when the Australian Sex Party candidate was excluded, the DLP gained Liberal Democratic Party preferences, overtaking the third Liberal/National candidate and gaining their preferences to win the last seat.

Elected for a six-year term from 1 July 2011, Madigan was the first senator to be elected as a federal member of the Democratic Labor Party of Australia since the 1970 Senate-only election. Madigan was in a balance of power position following the 2013 election after which an additional six non-government Senators were required to pass legislation. In his maiden speech to the Senate, Madigan denounced Victoria's "inhumane" abortion laws and committed to help restore Australia's dwindling manufacturing sector. He called for a "good Labor government that will bring something better to the people". He said that the DLP and ALP differed in a number of ways.

In December 2011, Madigan launched the Australian Manufacturing and Farming Program, with Senator Nick Xenophon and MP Bob Katter, an initiative to provide a forum for discussion of issues impacting manufacturers and farmers, together with politicians. As a representative of the DLP, Madigan took an unashamed anti-abortion stance. His additional publicly stated positions on behalf of the DLP included opposition to same-sex marriage; opposition to the sale of public infrastructure; opposition to a carbon tax, stating "We're not in favour of a carbon tax because we believe it's a tax on people and a tax on life"; an advocate for shops closing at midday on Saturdays; and at the Inaugural Jack Kane dinner in July 2011, Madigan advocated Chifley protectionist economics. Also, Madigan has publicly expressed his concern for human rights in West Papua.

=== Infighting and financial issues ===
It was reported in June 2010 that the party was on the brink of collapse, with rampant party infighting and less than $10,000 in the bank. On 18 March 2011 the Victorian Supreme Court handed down a reserved judgment confirming John Mulholland's valid removal as secretary. The decision was subsequently reversed by the full bench of the Victorian Supreme Court, but the Court also rejected Mulholland's claim that he was still the secretary of the DLP at the time the ruling was handed down. A Senate petition in August 2011 from Mulholland requested that current DLP Senator John Madigan be removed from the Senate, with the petition lodged using a residual standing order of the chamber that has not been deployed successfully by anyone for more than a century. In his petition, Mulholland says Madigan put himself forward in the 2010 election as a DLP candidate "although the DLP federal executive did not authorise or recognise his candidacy or have any part in his nomination".

In September, 2014 Madigan resigned from the DLP and became an independent, citing long-term internal party tensions, and claiming he had been undermined by a member of his staff. DLP federal president Paul Funnell strongly rejected Madigan's claims and demanded that he resign from the Senate so that his seat could be taken by a DLP member. The party also threatened High Court legal action to replace Madigan with a DLP senator.

=== 2014 Victorian state election ===
The DLP was elected to the upper house region of Western Metropolitan, with candidate Dr Rachel Carling-Jenkins winning 2.6% of the vote, despite suffering a 0.5% swing. On 26 June 2017, Carling-Jenkins resigned from the DLP to join Cory Bernardi's Australian Conservatives.

In-fighting continued throughout the decade to 2022, with purges of the South Australian, New South Wales and Victorian branches by the federal executive, including repeated expulsions and high profile resignations. That culminated in yet another purge of the Victorian executive and its supporters in January 2022, causing the loss of many Victorian branches. That led to a significant decline in DLP membership levels over the decade in those states. However from 2020, recruiting drives in the ACT, and later in Tasmania and NSW, led to a substantial increase in memberships in those states, partially offsetting these losses and helping to refocus the party on contemporary policy issues, including housing affordability, energy cost and reliability, and the growing threat posed by China.

=== 2022 Victorian state election ===
Victorian upper house MP Bernie Finn joined the DLP after his expulsion from the Liberal Party. Former Labor-turned-independent MP Adem Somyurek also joined the DLP just weeks before the state election, having resigned from parliament only days prior.

At the 2022 Victorian election, the DLP received 7.66% of the vote in its best seat and 3.51% (131,600 votes) overall in the upper house. It was the fifth-highest vote of any party in Victoria and the best result the DLP had achieved since its re-establishment in 1978. Adem Somyurek was elected to the upper house region of Northern Metropolitan with 4.75% of the vote. However, despite winning 5.16% of the vote, after preference distribution Bernie Finn missed out on re-election in the Western Metropolitan Region by only 210 votes, with Legalise Cannabis Party preferences electing a second Liberal candidate.

=== Victorian deregistration ===
Cary de Wit, executive secretary of the DLP in Victoria.

Despite its strong performance in the state election, following a review of its membership by the Victorian Electoral Commission (VEC) in 2024, the VEC announced that it intended to de-register the DLP. On 25 March 2024, immediately following the announcement by the VEC that it intended to de-register the DLP, Somyurek resigned from the party. The party was deregistered by the VEC on 16 May 2024.

However, following a successful appeal against the de-registration, the Victorian DLP was re-registered on 18 December 2024.

=== Unrelated party in Western Australia ===
An unrelated party also calling itself the Democratic Labour Party was registered with the Western Australian Electoral Commission (WAEC) on 16 September 2024. In response, the existing DLP issued a statement that the new party did not "share our values, policies or democratic processes".

On 15 November 2024 the Western Australian Parliament passed the Electoral Amendment (Names of Registered Political Parties) Act 2024 which prevented new parties from trying to confuse voters by registering using the names of unrelated parties already registered with the WAEC – in this case the Western Australian Labor Party.

On 14 January 2025, the party changed its name to "Stop Pedophiles! Protect kiddies!" That party ran candidates in the 2025 state election, in which it attracted less than one percent of the primary vote and forfeited its election deposits.

== Electoral results ==
=== Federal ===
Election	House of Representatives				Senate				
Election	Votes	%	Seats Won	+/–	Votes	%	Seats Won	Total Seats	+/–
1980	25,456	0.31	0 / 125	0	25,456	0.31	0 / 34	0 / 64	0
1983 (Note: Double dissolution)	17,318	0.20	0 / 125	0	47,206	0.59	0 / 64	0 / 64	0
1984	49,121	0.57	0 / 148	0	32,472	0.36	0 / 46	0 / 76	0
1987	3,334	0.04	0 / 148	0	50,894	0.54	0 / 76	0 / 76	0
1990	2,564	0.03	0 / 148	0	14,744	0.15	0 / 40	0 / 76	0
1993	The DLP did not contest any House of Representatives seats in 1993, 1996, 1998, or 2001.				38,317	0.36	0 / 40	0 / 76	0
1996	The DLP did not contest any House of Representatives seats in 1993, 1996, 1998, or 2001.				36,156	0.33	0 / 40	0 / 76	0
1998	The DLP did not contest any House of Representatives seats in 1993, 1996, 1998, or 2001.				29,893	0.27	0 / 40	0 / 76	0
2001	The DLP did not contest any House of Representatives seats in 1993, 1996, 1998, or 2001.				66,547	0.57	0 / 40	0 / 76	0
2004	1,372	0.01	0 / 150	0	58,042	0.49	0 / 40	0 / 76	0
2007	6,018	0.05	0 / 150	0	115,966	0.92	0 / 40	0 / 76	0
2010	5,212	0.04	0 / 150	0	134,987	1.06	1 / 40	1 / 76	▲1
2013	36,086	0.28	0 / 150	0	112,549	0.84	0 / 40	1 / 76	0
2016	3,166	0.02	0 / 150	0	94,525	0.68	0 / 76	0 / 76	▼1
2019	18,287	0.13	0 / 151	0	149,970	1.03	0 / 40	0 / 76	0
2022, 2025	The DLP did not contest the 2022 and 2025 election.								

=== State ===
==== Australian Capital Territory ====
Legislative Assembly
Election year	No. of overall votes	% of overall vote	No. of overall seats	+/–
2020	3,864	1.41	0 / 25	0
2024	2,283	0.83	0 / 25	0

==== Victoria ====
Legislative Council
Election year	No. of overall votes	% of overall vote	No. of overall seats	+/–
1979	3,212	0.15 #5	0 / 34	0
1982	11,780	0.53 #5	0 / 34	0
1992	118,244	4.54 #4	0 / 34	0
1996	43,553	1.58 #5	0 / 34	0
2006	58,722	1.97 #5	1 / 40	▲1
2010	75,080	2.33 #5	0 / 40	▼1
2014	79,308	2.32 #6	1 / 40	▲1
2018	75,221	2.10 #8	0 / 40	▼1
2022	131,600	3.51 #5	1 / 40	▲1

== Elected representatives ==
=== Senate ===
- John Madigan (Vic), 2011–2014 (Left the party)

==== Victorian Legislative Council ====
- Peter Kavanagh (2006–2010)
- Rachel Carling-Jenkins (2014–2017) (Left the party)
- Bernie Finn (2022)
- Adem Somyurek (2022–2024) (Left the party)

==== Moreland City Council ====
- John Kavanagh (2004–2014)

== See also ==
- Australian Labor Party
