= Jacinta Ermacora =

Australian politician

Jacinta Ermacora MLC

Member of the Victorian Legislative Council for Western Victoria
- Incumbent
- Assumed office November 2022

Jacinta Ermacora is an Australian politician. She is a member of the Victorian Legislative Council representing Western Victoria since November 2022. Ermacora is a member of the Labor Party.
