= Sarah Mansfield =

Australian politician

Sarah Mansfield MLC
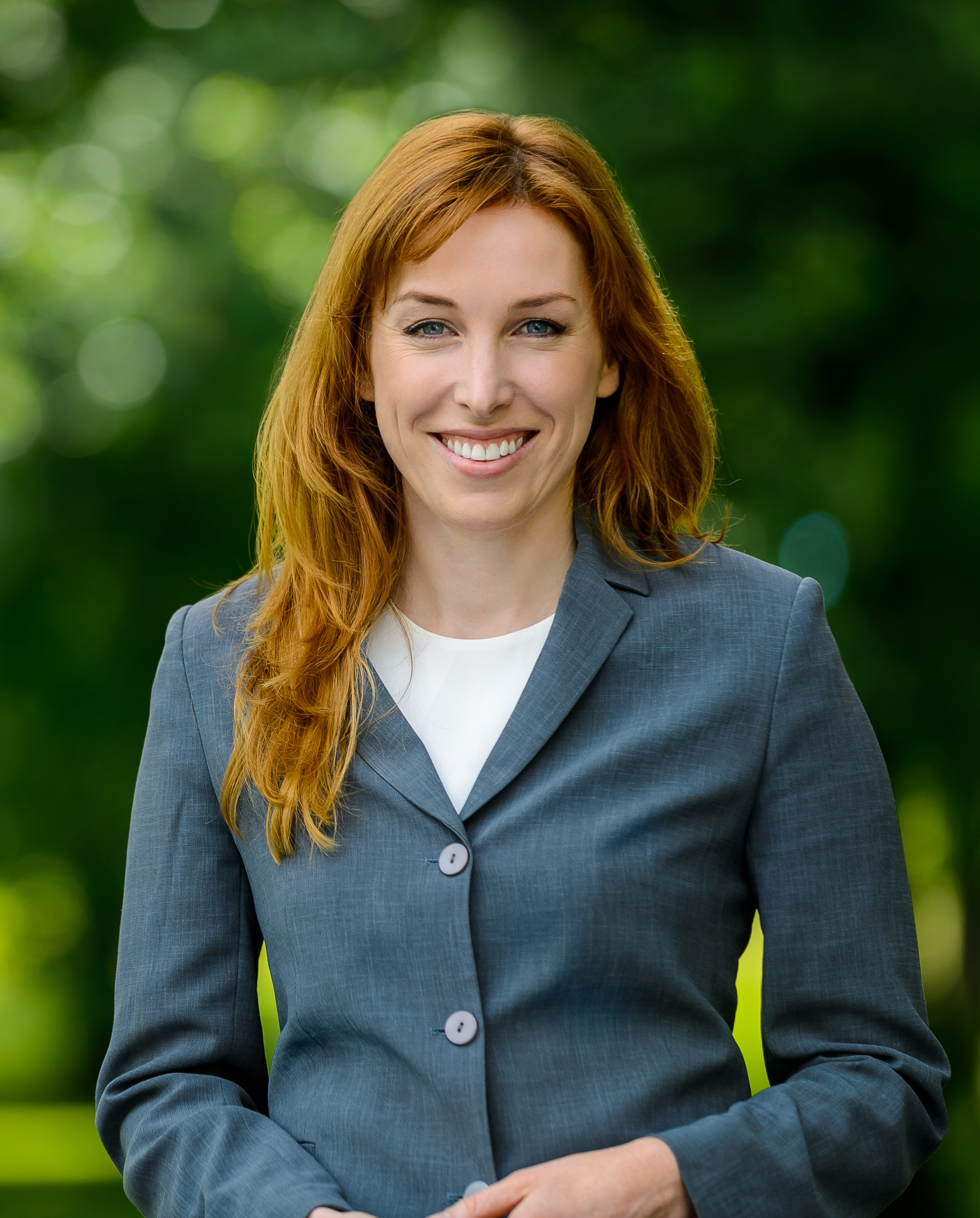
- Mansfield in 2015

Deputy leader of the Victorian Greens
- Incumbent
- Assumed office 23 April 2024 Serving with Sam Hibbins until 29 October 2024
- Leader: Ellen Sandell
- Preceded by: Ellen Sandell

Member of the Victorian Legislative Council for Western Victoria Region
- Incumbent
- Assumed office 26 November 2022
- Preceded by: Andy Meddick

Councillor of the City of Greater Geelong for Brownbill Ward
- In office 27 October 2017 – 26 November 2022
- Succeeded by: Melissa Cadwell

Personal details
- Born: Sydney, New South Wales, Australia
- Party: Greens
- Education: London School of Economics
- Profession: General Practitioner; Politician
- Website: https://sarahmansfield.org.au/

Sarah Mansfield is an Australian politician from Geelong, Victoria. A member of the Greens, she has been a member of the Victorian Legislative Council since the 2022 Victorian state election, representing the Western Victoria Region, and has served as the party’s deputy leader since 2024.

== Career ==
Mansfield is by profession a general practitioner (GP), graduating from the University of Melbourne with a degree in Medical Science. She completed her master's degree at the London School of Economics, studying Health Policy, Planning and Financing. Becoming a fellow of the Royal Australian College of General Practitioners in 2015, she worked as a GP in Point Lonsdale and as a senior lecturer at Deakin University.

Mansfield's involvement in politics began in 2015, when she started working as a volunteer staffer in the office of Greens Senator Richard Di Natale. She was a candidate in the 2016 Australian federal election for the Division of Corio. She served as a councillor for the City of Greater Geelong, first elected in 2017 and again re-elected in 2020.

Mansfield was first elected to the Victorian Legislative Council for the Western Victoria Region at the 2022 Victorian state election. The Greens won 8.68% of the vote in Western Victoria Region, with most of their vote coming from the City of Greater Geelong. She is regional Victoria's first Greens Member of Parliament.

On 23 April 2024, Mansfield became one of the co-deputy leaders of the Victorian Greens, alongside Sam Hibbins, under the leadership of Ellen Sandell. She was also elected as the Leader of the Greens in the Legislative Council. She has been the sole deputy leader since Hibbins was suspended from the party room in November 2024.

== Political positions ==
=== Housing ===
Mansfield has supported policies aimed at increasing public and social housing in Victoria. She has been critical of reliance on market-based approaches to housing affordability and has argued for a greater role for government in addressing housing supply and rental costs, including in regional areas.

=== Environment and climate change ===
Mansfield supports stronger action on climate change and environmental protection. She has stated that climate change poses risks to regional communities and has supported emissions reduction targets and the expansion of renewable energy. She has stated that "Labor has no vision and no policies that prioritise our health and the health of our environment."

=== Israel–Palestine conflict ===
Mansfield has been publicly critical of Israel’s military actions in Gaza following the October 7 attacks. She has participated in public demonstrations calling for an end to the conflict and has urged the Australian government to take action in response to civilian casualties in Gaza.

In May 2024, Mansfield moved a motion in the Victorian Legislative Council calling on the government to table documents relating to agreements between the Victorian government, Israeli defence company Elbit Systems, and the Israeli Ministry of Defense. The motion passed 22-15.

=== Health ===
Mansfield has linked health outcomes to broader social and economic factors. She has supported increased investment in public healthcare services, particularly in regional Victoria, and has argued for a preventative approach to health policy. Mansfield has supported reforms to Victoria’s voluntary assisted dying laws, including measures to reduce access barriers and expand eligibility. She has also opposed the Victorian government’s decision to abolish VicHealth as an independent statutory authority, arguing that the move would weaken public health promotion and oversight of harmful industries.

=== Youth participation ===
Mansfield has advocated for increased involvement of young people in decision-making processes. She has stated her belief that young Victorians’ perspectives are often overlooked, particularly on issues such as housing affordability, climate change, and social equality. Mansfield has described formal parliamentary processes as potentially intimidating and a barrier to youth participation in politics. Mansfield has highlighted the Geelong Youth Council as an example of a mechanism through which young people can formally contribute to local governance. She has argued that young people should be recognised as active contributors to political change rather than being treated simply as future leaders.
