= Vote 1 Local Jobs =

Former political party in Victoria, Australia

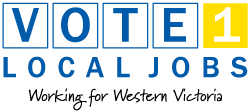
- Secretary: James Purcell
- Founded: November 2014; 12 years ago
- Registered: 3 November 2014; 12 years ago
- Dissolved: 30 July 2019; 7 years ago
- Headquarters: 32 Bank Street, Port Fairy, Victoria, 3284
- Ideology: Regionalism
- Slogan: "Working for Western Victoria"
- Victorian Legislative Council: 1 / 40 (2014–2018)
- Moyne Shire Council: 1 / 7 (2014)

Website
- vote1localjobs.com.au

Vote 1 Local Jobs was a minor political party in the state of Victoria, Australia. It was registered as a political party by the Victorian Electoral Commission on 3 November 2014, in time for the 2014 state election.

== Policies and philosophy ==
The Vote 1 Local Jobs party is mainly concerned with employment issues in Victoria's Western District.

The party's key policies at the 2014 election included:

- Opposition to foreign ownership/investment of agricultural land
- Legislating against the 'dumping' of foreign products in Australia
- Decentralising government services from major cities to make services easier to access by people in country areas
- Cutting the $50 million the government spends on the Grand Prix and injecting these funds into Western Victoria’s roads
- Creating government incentives to encourage job creation in Western Victoria
- Support of jumps racing
- Support of camping and fishing in public reserves.

In 2015 the party voted in favour of an exemption for religious institutions to deny same-sex couples access to adoption.

== History ==
The Vote 1 Local Jobs party was formed in November 2014 by James Purcell, former councillor and mayor of the Shire of Moyne. The party was registered by the Victorian Electoral Commission on 3 November 2014, in time for the 2014 Victorian state election, held later that month.

At the 2014 Victorian election, two candidates stood for the party for the Victorian Legislative Council. Purcell stood in the Western Victoria Region and received 5,501 first preference votes (1.26% of the region), and after the distribution of preferences was the last of the five members elected for the region, and sat as a crossbencher for a four-year term. In the Northern Metropolitan Region the candidate was unsuccessful.

At the 2018 Victorian state election, the party lost its sole member in the Legislative Council. While Nathan Purcell and Aaron Purcell unsuccessful stood in the Northern Metropolitan Region for the party, James Purcell contested the Legislative Assembly seat of South-West Coast as an independent, receiving 16.47% of the vote, and was also unsuccessful. The party was deregistered on 30 July 2019.

== Electoral results ==
Victorian Legislative Council
| Election year | # of overall votes | % of overall vote | # of overall seats won | # of overall seats | +/– | Notes |
| 2014 | 7,108 | 0.21 (#19) | 1 / 40 | 1 / 40 | ▲1 | Shared balance of power |
| 2018 | 5,338 | 0.15 (#20) | 0 / 40 | 0 / 40 | ▼1 | |
