= Joe McCracken =

Australian politician (born 1988)

Joe McCracken MLC
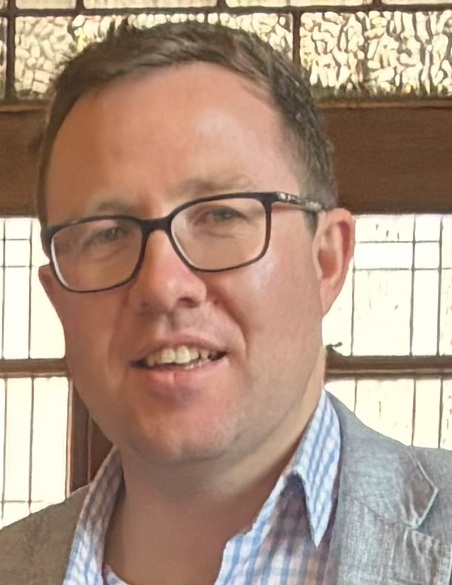

Member of the Victorian Legislative Council for Western Victoria Region
- Incumbent
- Assumed office November 2022

Personal details
- Born: 30 January 1988 (age 38) Ballarat, Victoria, Australia.

Joe McCracken (born 30 January 1988) is an Australian politician. He has been a member of the Victorian Legislative Council since November 2022, representing Western Victoria Region. McCracken is a member of the Liberal Party.

== Early life and education ==
McCracken was born in January 30, 1988 and grew up in Ballarat. He worked in the family run pub. He attended St Patrick's College, Ballarat.

== Pre-Political Career ==
After gaining a Bachelor of Commerce & Bachelor of Management, McCracken worked as an accountant in Ballarat. He then completed a Diploma of Education before beginning teaching at Trinity College, Colac, in 2013.

== Politics ==
McCracken served as a councillor for Shire of Colac Otway between 2016-2022, served as Mayor in 2017-18, and Deputy Mayor in 2018-2020. In November 2022 he was elected as last of the five members of the Western Victoria Region of the Victorian Legislative Council.

In January 2026, McCracken announced he would retire from parliament and would not re-contest the 2026 state election. He resigned as shadow assistant minister for education and shadow cabinet secretary the following month.
