= James Purcell (politician) =

Australian politician

James Purcell MLC

Member of the Victorian Legislative Council for Western Victoria Region
- In office 29 November 2014 – 24 November 2018
- Succeeded by: Andy Meddick

Personal details
- Born: 7 January 1953 (age 73) Bessiebelle, Victoria, Australia
- Party: Vote 1 Local Jobs
- Education: Deakin University
- Occupation: Accountant

James Desmond Purcell (born 7 January 1953) is an Australian politician. He was a Vote 1 Local Jobs member of the Victorian Legislative Council, having represented Western Victoria Region from 2014 to 2018.

== Early life ==
Purcell was born and raised in Bessiebelle, in Victoria's Western District, by his parents Bernie and Bonnie Purcell. He grew up on the family farm with his five siblings. Purcell attended Heywood High School and earned his accounting qualification from Deakin University's Warrnambool campus whereupon he was admitted to the Charter of Professional Accountants.

== Career ==
James Purcell has worked in senior financial positions with many large corporations, including Amcor and GlaxoSmithKline (10 years in Port Fairy, Melbourne and London). He owns a Port Fairy-based accounting firm and self-storage business.

== Political career ==
=== Local council ===
Purcell began his political career in local government where he was twice elected to the Moyne Shire Council, in 2008 and 2012. Purcell served as Mayor in 2010 and 2014, stepping down when he was elected to the State Parliament.

=== Victorian Parliament ===
At the 2010 Victorian state election, Purcell stood as an independent candidate in the District of South-West Coast, where he gained 11.53% of the primary vote but lost to the incumbent Liberal Party candidate, Denis Napthine.

In November 2014, Purcell founded the Vote 1 Local Jobs Party to represent the Western Victoria Region in the Victorian Legislative Council. The party was registered in November 2014 and later that month contested the 2014 Victorian election with Purcell as party leader.

Purcell stood again in the 2014 Victorian state election for the Legislative Council and was elected as the sole representative of the Vote 1 Local Jobs Party for the Western Victoria Region. At the 2018 state election he again stood in the Legislative Assembly seat of South-West Coast as an independent, but was defeated winning only 16.47% of the vote. He once again ran in the same seat in the 2022 state election but failed to win the seat, with only 6.0% of the vote.
