= David Koch (Australian politician) =

Australian politician (born 1949)

Member of the Victorian Legislative Council
- In office 30 November 2002 – 29 November 2014

Personal details
- Born: 24 October 1949 (age 76) Coleraine, Victoria
- Party: Liberal Party
- Occupation: Farmer, real estate agent
- Website: www.davidkoch.com.au

David Frank Koch (born 24 October 1949) is an Australian politician. Born in Coleraine, Victoria, he was educated at Geelong College 1960–67, a farmer from 1973 to 2001, when he became a real estate agent. He held numerous local positions and was a Wannon Shire Councillor from 1987–1994, serving as president in 1991.

On 30 November 2002, Koch was elected to the Victorian Legislative Council as a Liberal member for Western Province. On 25 November 2006, Koch was elected as a member for the newly created Western Victoria Region, resigning on 29 November 2014.
