= Simon Ramsay (politician) =

Australian politician

Member of the Victorian Legislative Council for Western Victoria Region
- In office 27 November 2010 – 24 November 2018

Personal details
- Born: 7 March 1955 (age 71) Birregurra, Victoria, Australia
- Party: Liberal Party
- Domestic partner: Sarah Henderson (2009–2017)
- Relations: Robert Ramsay (great-grandfather)

Simon Andrew Ramsay (born 7 March 1955) is an Australian politician. He represented the Liberal Party in the Victorian Legislative Council from 2010 to 2018.

Ramsay was born and raised on his family's property Mooleric, near Birregurra, Victoria. His great-grandfather was Robert Ramsay, who was a member of the Victorian Legislative Assembly from 1870 to 1882. He studied at Geelong Grammar School, then obtained a Diploma in Farm Management from Glenormiston College. He worked as a jackaroo, then as manager of the East Mooleric Pastoral Company from 1974. He was president of the Victorian Farmers Federation from 2005 to 2009.

In November 2009, Ramsay was preselected by the Liberal Party to as a candidate for the Western Victoria Region in the Victorian Legislative Assembly, after the retirement of John Vogels. He was elected at the 2010 state election. Earlier in the year, Ramsay had contested preselection for the federal seat of Corangamite, although he lost to Sarah Henderson. Ramsay and Henderson began a relationship shortly afterwards, but separated in 2017.

In 2014, paramedics and firefighters protested at the opening of Ramsay's Ballarat office, after he made comments in the media that paramedics earned an average $93,500 a year.

In July 2018, Ramsay was charged with drink driving when police recorded a blood alcohol reading of 0.191 per cent, which is nearly four times the legal limit in Victoria, after pulling his car over in Barwon Heads. Police pulled him over after his car was seen driving on the wrong side of the road. He resigned as an assistant shadow minister, and party leader Matthew Guy asked him to "consider his future in parliament".

Ramsay subsequently announced his retirement from politics.
