= Gayle Tierney =

Australian politician

The Honourable Gayle Tierney MLC

Minister for Water
- In office 19 December 2024 – 15 April 2026
- Premier: Jacinta Allan
- Preceded by: Harriet Shing
- Succeeded by: Harriet Shing

Minister for Skills and TAFE
- In office 2 October 2023 – 15 April 2026
- Premier: Jacinta Allan
- Preceded by: Herself (as Minister for Skills and Training and Minister for Higher Education)
- Succeeded by: Colin Brooks

Minister for Regional Development
- In office 2 October 2023 – 19 December 2024
- Premier: Jacinta Allan
- Preceded by: Harriet Shing
- Succeeded by: Jaclyn Symes

Minister for Agriculture
- In office 22 June 2022 – 2 October 2023
- Premier: Daniel Andrews; Jacinta Allan
- Preceded by: Mary-Anne Thomas
- Succeeded by: Ros Spence

Minister for Higher Education
- In office 29 November 2018 – 2 October 2023
- Premier: Daniel Andrews; Jacinta Allan
- Preceded by: Position established
- Succeeded by: Herself (as Minister for Skills and TAFE)

Minister for Training and Skills
- In office 9 November 2016 – 2 October 2023
- Premier: Daniel Andrews; Jacinnta Allan
- Preceded by: Steve Herbert
- Succeeded by: Herself (as Minister for Skills and TAFE)

Deputy Leader of the Government in the Legislative Council
- In office 29 September 2020 – 5 December 2022
- Premier: Daniel Andrews
- Leader: Jaclyn Symes
- Preceded by: Jaclyn Symes
- Succeeded by: Lizzie Blandthorn

Minister for Corrections
- In office 9 November 2016 – 29 November 2018
- Preceded by: Steve Herbert
- Succeeded by: Ben Carroll

Member of the Victorian Legislative Council for Western Victoria Region
- Incumbent
- Assumed office 25 November 2006

Personal details
- Party: Labor Party
- Education: Flinders University
- Website: www.gayletierney.com.au

Gayle Tierney is an Australian politician. She has been a Labor Party member of the Victorian Legislative Council since November 2006, representing Western Victoria Region.

Tierney was the minister for training and skills from November 2016, the minister for higher education from November 2018, and the minister for agriculture from June 2022. She was also the minister for corrections between 2016 and 2018.

== Early life ==
Tierney studied politics and Asian studies at Flinders University, before entering the trade union movement.

Notably, she was the first woman to become state secretary of the traditionally male-dominated Vehicle Division of the Automotive, Metals and Engineering Union (now part of the Australian Manufacturing Workers Union), having in that role from 1993 to 2006, and was its federal president from 2000 to 2006.

== Political career ==
Tierney entered politics at the 2006 state election.

She has held various positions including shadow parliamentary secretary for employment from 2012 to 2014 and cabinet secretary in 2016.

On 9 November 2016, Tierney was appointed as minister for corrections and minister for training and skills following the resignation of Steve Herbert.

Following the 2018 Victorian state election, she was re-appointed as minister for training and skills and appointed minister of higher education.

In 2020, Tierney was appointed deputy leader of the government in the Legislative Council. In June 2022, she was additionally appointed as minister for agriculture.

Tierney is a member of the Labor Left faction of the Labor Party.

== Personal life ==
Tierney is married and has an adult son.

Political offices
| Preceded by Steve Herbert | Minister for Corrections; 2016–2018 | Succeeded by Ben Carroll |
| Preceded by Steve Herbert | Minister for Training and Skills; 2016–present | Incumbent |
| New title | Minister for Higher Education; 2018–present | Incumbent |
| Preceded by Mary-Anne Thomas | Minister for Agriculture; 2022–present | Incumbent |
