= Electoral results for the Western Metropolitan Region =

This is a list of electoral results for the Western Metropolitan Region in Victorian state elections from the region's creation in 2006 until the present.

== Election results ==
=== Elections in the 2020s ===
==== 2022 ====
Labor were defending three seats. The Liberal Party and Derryn Hinch's Justice Party were defending one seat each.

2022 Victorian state election: Western Metropolitan
| Party | Candidate | Votes | % | ±% |
|---|---|---|---|---|
| Quota | | 74,860 | | |
| Labor | 1. Lizzie Blandthorn (elected 1); 2. Ingrid Stitt (elected 3); 3. Cesar Melhem; 4. Cuc Lum; 5. Nurul Khan | 166,371 | 37.04 | −9.81 |
| Liberal | 1. Moira Deeming (elected 2); 2. Trung Luu (elected 5); 3. Golam Haque; 4. Manish Patel; 5. Luan Walker | 109,895 | 24.47 | +3.65 |
| Greens | 1. Bernadette Thomas; 2. Sarah Bray; 3. Isabelle McRae McLeod; 4. Lloyd Davies; 5. Pierre Vario | 36,239 | 8.07 | −0.04 |
| Democratic Labour | 1. Bernie Finn; 2. Thi Kiem-Lien Lee | 23,422 | 5.21 | +1.54 |
| Legalise Cannabis | 1. David Ettershank (elected 4); 2. Raffaela Menta | 19,295 | 4.30 | +4.30 |
| Victorian Socialists | 1. Liz Walsh; 2. Aran Mylvaganam | 16,095 | 3.58 | +3.02 |
| Family First | 1. Darren Buller; 2. Mary Filmer | 14,261 | 3.18 | +3.18 |
| One Nation | 1. Ursula Van Bree; 2. Frank Vrionis | 7,691 | 1.71 | +1.71 |
| Liberal Democrats | 1. Anthony Cursio; 2. Liam Roche | 6,546 | 1.46 | −0.26 |
| Shooters, Fishers, Farmers | 1. Ken Vickers; 2. Geoff Ashby | 6,401 | 1.43 | −0.59 |
| Animal Justice | 1. Meg Watkins; 2. Nat Kopas | 6,209 | 1.38 | −1.26 |
| Justice | 1. Peter Sullivan; 2. Jean-Marie D'Argent | 5,371 | 1.20 | −5.80 |
| United Australia | 1. Andrew Cuthbertson; 2. Deepak Bansal | 4,737 | 1.06 | +1.06 |
| Sack Dan Andrews | 1. Samson Palkuri; 2. Burkin Yalaz | 3,653 | 0.81 | +0.81 |
| Reason | 1. David Thirkettle-Watts; 2. Harry Millward | 3,617 | 0.81 | −0.24 |
| Freedom | 1. John McBride; 2. Dan McBride | 3,513 | 0.78 | +0.78 |
| Angry Victorians | 1. Catherine Cumming; 2. Adam Robinson; 3. Jennifer Zalme | 2,596 | 0.57 | +0.57 |
| New Democrats | 1. Kaushaliya Virjibhai Vaghela; 2. Mohammed Qasim Shaik; 3. Arix Maheshkumar Bishnoi; 4. Anitha Jyothi Palkuri; 5. Yogesh Kumar Malhotra | 2,470 | 0.55 | +0.55 |
| Health Australia | 1. Isaac Golden; 2. Leah Golden | 2,122 | 0.47 | −0.49 |
| Sustainable Australia | 1. Bert Jessup; 2. Dennis Bilic | 2,046 | 0.46 | −0.28 |
| Independent Liberal | 1. Fred Ackerman; 2. Mark Barro | 1,845 | 0.41 | +0.41 |
| Companions and Pets | 1. Craig Treherne; 2. Mary Britton | 1,806 | 0.40 | +0.40 |
| Independent | 1. Walter Villagonzalo; 2. Sam Alcordo | 1,623 | 0.36 | +0.36 |
| Transport Matters | 1. Daniel Lowinger; 2. Greg Collins | 1,204 | 0.27 | −0.41 |
| Independent | Esther Demian | 144 | 0.03 | +0.03 |
| Total formal votes | | 449,155 | 95.94 | +0.79 |
| Informal votes | | 19,025 | 4.06 | −0.79 |
| Turnout | | 468,180 | 87.00 | −2.25 |

=== Elections in the 2010s ===
==== 2018 ====
Labor were defending two seats. Liberals, Greens and Democratic Labour were defending one each.

2018 Victorian state election: Western Metropolitan
| Party | Candidate | Votes | % | ±% |
|---|---|---|---|---|
| Quota | | 77,210 | | |
| Labor | 1. Cesar Melhem (elected 1); 2. Ingrid Stitt (elected 2); 3. Kaushaliya Vaghela (elected 4); 4. Kirsten Psaila; 5. Louise Persse | 214,279 | 46.25 | +2.27 |
| Liberal | 1. Bernie Finn (elected 3); 2. Dinesh Gourisetty; 3. Moira Deeming; 4. David Wood; 5. Nathan Di Noia | 98,458 | 21.25 | −2.32 |
| Greens | 1. Huong Truong; 2. Emely Cash; 3. Bernadette Thomas; 4. Elena Pereyra; 5. Annie Chessells-Beeby | 40,417 | 8.72 | −1.61 |
| Justice | 1. Catherine Cumming (elected 5); 2. Daniel Cumming | 31,615 | 6.82 | +6.82 |
| Democratic Labour | 1. Walter Villagonzalo; 2. Mark Royal | 16,378 | 3.54 | +0.97 |
| Animal Justice | 1. Terri Beech; 2. Karina Leung | 12,028 | 2.60 | +1.08 |
| Shooters, Fishers, Farmers | 1. Wayne Rigg; 2. Geoff Ashby | 8,914 | 1.92 | +0.68 |
| Liberal Democrats | 1. Adam Karlovsky; 2. Mark Thompson; 3. Christopher Reeves | 7,938 | 1.71 | −3.82 |
| Reason | 1. Chris Botha; 2. Jamie Twidale | 5,337 | 1.15 | −1.55 |
| Aussie Battler | 1. Stuart O'Neill; 2. Ian Kearns | 4,406 | 0.95 | +0.95 |
| Health Australia | 1. Briony Jenkinson; 2. Deanne Glenn | 4,354 | 0.94 | +0.94 |
| Voluntary Euthanasia | 1. Joan Beckwith; 2. Nia Sims | 3,752 | 0.81 | +0.81 |
| Sustainable Australia | 1. Allan Doensen; 2. Richard Belcher | 3,513 | 0.76 | +0.76 |
| Liberty Alliance | 1. Francine Cohen; 2. Terri Franklin | 3,294 | 0.71 | +0.71 |
| Transport Matters | 1. Daniel Lowinger; 2. Ramy Abdelnour | 3,067 | 0.66 | +0.66 |
| Victorian Socialists | 1. Jorge Jorquera; 2. Andrew Charles | 2,765 | 0.60 | +0.60 |
| Country | 1. Benito Caruso; 2. Tony Leen | 2,207 | 0.48 | +0.29 |
| Hudson for Northern Victoria | 1. Hayley Webb; 2. Casey Eckel | 573 | 0.12 | +0.12 |
| Independent | 1. Diana Grima | 199 | 0.04 | +0.04 |
| Independent | 1. Kathy Majdlik | 165 | 0.04 | +0.04 |
| Total formal votes | | 463,258 | 95.15 | −0.63 |
| Informal votes | | 23,606 | 4.85 | +0.63 |
| Turnout | | 486,864 | 89.25 | −3.06 |

==== 2014 ====
2014 Victorian state election: Western Metropolitan
| Party | Candidate | Votes | % | ±% |
|---|---|---|---|---|
| Quota | | 72,606 | | |
| Labor | 1. Cesar Melhem (elected 1); 2. Khalil Eideh (elected 3); 3. Stanley Chiang; 4. George Seitz; 5. Kirsten Psaila | 191,607 | 43.98 | −2.16 |
| Liberal | 1. Bernie Finn (elected 2); 2. Andrew Elsbury; 3. David Tran; 4. Gayle Murphy; 5. Cassandra Marr | 102,681 | 23.57 | −6.85 |
| Greens | 1. Colleen Hartland (elected 4); 2. Huong Truong; 3. Dinesh Jayasuriya; 4. Sam Long; 5. Jonathon Marsden | 44,991 | 10.33 | −1.55 |
| Liberal Democrats | 1. Zeev Vinokurov; 2. Joel Spencer | 24,080 | 5.53 | +5.53 |
| Sex Party | 1. Vicki Nash; 2. Adrian Trajstman | 11,774 | 2.70 | −1.85 |
| Democratic Labour | 1. Rachel Carling-Jenkins (elected 5); 2. Michael Freeman | 11,183 | 2.57 | −0.53 |
| Palmer United | 1. Trevor Dance; 2. Peter Haberecht | 9,629 | 2.21 | +2.21 |
| Voice for the West | 1. Berhan Ahmed; 2. Kylie Georgiou; 3. John Turner | 7,757 | 1.78 | +1.78 |
| Animal Justice | 1. Roy Taylor; 2. Douglas Leith | 6,620 | 1.52 | +1.52 |
| Family First | 1. Jaxon Calder; 2. Rebecca Filliponi | 6,355 | 1.46 | −2.23 |
| Christians | 1. Geoff Rogers; 2. Kirsten James | 5,973 | 1.37 | +1.37 |
| Shooters and Fishers | 1. Jake Wilson; 2. Trevor Carstein | 5,406 | 1.24 | +1.24 |
| Cyclists | 1. Frank Reinthaler; 2. Nick O'Keefe | 3,346 | 0.77 | +0.77 |
| Rise Up Australia | 1. Jeff Truscott; 2. Charles Rozario | 1,754 | 0.40 | +0.40 |
| People Power Victoria | 1. Jerry Creaney; 2. Chez Caruso | 1,660 | 0.38 | +0.38 |
| Country Alliance | 1. Ben Caruso; 2. Andrew Hepner | 817 | 0.19 | +0.19 |
| Total formal votes | | 435,633 | 95.78 | |
| Informal votes | | 19,197 | 4.22 | |
| Turnout | | 454,830 | 92.31 | |

==== 2010 ====
2010 Victorian state election: Western Metropolitan
| Party | Candidate | Votes | % | ±% |
|---|---|---|---|---|
| Quota | | 70,452 | | |
| Labor | 1. Martin Pakula (elected 1); 2. Khalil Eideh (elected 3); 3. Bob Smith; 4. Llewellyn Rees; 5. Claudine Spinner | 198,100 | 46.9 | −11.8 |
| Liberal | 1. Bernie Finn (elected 2); 2. Andrew Elsbury (elected 4); 3. Victoria Fairbairn; 4. Jeremy Barth; 5. William Kenny | 125,267 | 29.6 | +5.1 |
| Greens | 1. Colleen Hartland (elected 5); 2. Robert Humphreys; 3. Liz Ingham; 4. Simon Crawford; 5. Owen Gale | 50,715 | 12.0 | +2.6 |
| Sex Party | 1. Joël Murray; 2. Merinda Davis | 20,008 | 4.7 | +4.7 |
| Family First | 1. Daniel Mumby; 2. Lisa Garay | 15,282 | 3.6 | −0.4 |
| Democratic Labor | 1. Mark Farrell; 2. Stephanie Mazzarella; 3. Georga Byrne; 4. Samuel Notaro; 5. Marguerita Kavanagh | 13,336 | 3.2 | +2.1 |
| Total formal votes | | 422,708 | 95.4 | +1.7 |
| Informal votes | | 20,549 | 4.6 | −1.7 |
| Turnout | | 443,257 | 92.3 | −0.2 |

=== Elections in the 2000s ===
==== 2006 ====
2006 Victorian state election: Western Metropolitan
| Party | Candidate | Votes | % | ±% |
|---|---|---|---|---|
| Quota | | 62,402 | | |
| Labor | 1. Justin Madden (elected 1); 2. Khalil Eideh (elected 3); 3. Martin Pakula (elected 4); 4. Henry Barlow; 5. Lisa Zanatta | 219,706 | 58.7 | −3.5 |
| Liberal | 1. Bernie Finn (elected 2); 2. Stephen Reynolds; 3. Wayne Tseng; 4. Ann Bitans | 91,604 | 24.5 | −1.2 |
| Greens | 1. Colleen Hartland (elected 5); 2. Nam Bui; 3. Robert Humphreys; 4. Liz Ingham; 5. Nora Tchekmeyan | 35,201 | 9.4 | −0.2 |
| Family First | 1. Ashley Alp; 2. Anh Nguyen; 3. Robert Walker; 4. Marie Spataro; 5. Roger San Jose | 15,032 | 4.0 | +4.0 |
| People Power | 1. Max Jackson; 2. Christine Williams | 5,098 | 1.4 | +1.4 |
| Democratic Labor | 1. Mark Beshara; 2. Shane McCarthy | 4,029 | 1.1 | +1.1 |
| Democrats | 1. Robert Livesay; 2. Danii Coric; 3. Roger Howe | 3,741 | 1.0 | −1.6 |
| Total formal votes | | 374,411 | 93.7 | −1.5 |
| Informal votes | | 25,075 | 6.3 | +1.5 |
| Turnout | | 399,486 | 92.5 | |
