= Candidates of the 2022 Victorian state election =

This is a list of the candidates of the 2022 Victorian state election.

A record 742 candidates contested the 88 Legislative Assembly seats at the Victorian election on 26 November 2022, also including the supplementary election in Narracan on 28 January 2023. This overtook the previous record of 543 candidates in 2014 and was well up from 507 candidates in 2018. The 454 candidates for the Legislative Council is the highest number of upper house candidates in a Victorian election, up from 380 in 2018.

== Retiring MPs ==
The following members did not contest the election:

=== Labor ===
- Luke Donnellan MLA (Narre Warren North) – lost preselection 13 December 2021
- Nazih Elasmar MLC (Northern Metropolitan)
- John Eren MLA (Lara) – announced 26 November 2021
- Martin Foley MLA (Albert Park) – announced 23 June 2022
- Mark Gepp MLC (Northern Victoria) – announced 2 December 2021
- Danielle Green MLA (Yan Yean) – announced 24 November 2021
- Dustin Halse MLA (Ringwood) – announced 24 November 2021
- Jill Hennessy MLA (Altona) – announced 24 November 2021
- Marlene Kairouz MLA (Kororoit) – lost preselection 13 December 2021
- James Merlino MLA (Monbulk) – announced 23 June 2022
- Frank McGuire MLA (Broadmeadows) – lost preselection 13 December 2021
- Lisa Neville MLA (Bellarine) – announced 23 June 2022
- Martin Pakula MLA (Keysborough) – announced 23 June 2022
- Jaala Pulford MLC (Western Victoria) – announced 28 October 2022
- Robin Scott MLA (Preston) – lost preselection 13 December 2021
- Richard Wynne MLA (Richmond) – announced 25 November 2021

=== Liberal ===
- Bruce Atkinson MLC (Eastern Metropolitan) – announced 9 June 2022
- Gary Blackwood MLA (Narracan) – announced 9 November 2021
- Neale Burgess MLA (Hastings) – announced 11 November 2021
- Cathrine Burnett-Wake MLC (Eastern Victoria) – lost preselection 31 July 2022
- David Morris MLA (Mornington) – lost preselection 10 December 2021
- Craig Ondarchie MLC (Northern Metropolitan) – lost preselection 24 July 2022
- Gordon Rich-Phillips MLC (South Eastern Metropolitan) – announced 17 June 2022
- Tim Smith MLA (Kew) – announced 7 November 2021

=== National ===
- Steph Ryan MLA (Euroa) – announced 5 July 2022

=== Independent ===
- Russell Northe MLA (Morwell) – announced 26 July 2022

== Legislative Assembly ==
Sitting members are shown in bold text. Successful candidates are highlighted in the relevant colour. Where there is possible confusion, an asterisk (*) is also used.

Electorate	Held by	Labor candidate	Coalition candidate	Greens candidate	AJP candidate	Family First candidate	Freedom candidate	Other candidates
Albert Park	Labor	Nina Taylor	Lauren Sherson (Lib)	Kim Samiotis	Cassandra Westwood	Viorel Bradea	Elizabeth Antunovic	Georgie Dragwidge (Ind); Lance Smart (LDP)
Ashwood	Labor	**Matt Fregon**	Asher Judah (Lib)	Peter Morgan	Milton Griffiths	Keith Geyer	Norman F. Baker	Michael Doyle (Ind); Lynnette Saloumi (Ind)
Bass	Labor	**Jordan Crugnale**	Aaron Brown (Lib); Brett Tessari (Nat)	Callum Bugbird	Elly Mousellis	Martin Verhagen	Marcus Munday	Meg Edwards (Ind); Jeni Jobe (Ind); Mark O'Neill (DLP)
Bayswater	Labor	**Jackson Taylor**	**Nick Wakeling** (Lib)	Nadia Sirninger Rankin	Alyssa Wormald	Gary Coombes	Chris Field	Thomas Dolan (DLP); Chloe Mackallah (Ind); Ashley Heap (LCA)
Bellarine	Labor	Alison Marchant	Donnie Grigau (Lib)	Rachel Semmens	Adam Cardilini	Guy Manuell	Kylee Muse	Sarah Fenton (Ind); Brett Anthony Ritchie (DHJP); Brendan Taylor (AVP)
Benambra	Liberal	Mark Tait	**Bill Tilley** (Lib)	Luke Brady	Mike Fuery	Janelle Stratton	Adrian James O'Brien	Jacqui Hawkins (Ind); Dean Rossiter (LDP)
Bendigo East	Labor	**Jacinta Allan**	Darin Schade (Lib)	Michael Tolhurst	Vyonne McLelland-Howe	Evelyn Keetelaar	–	James Laurie (Ind); Ben Mihail (PHON)
Bendigo West	Labor	**Maree Edwards**	Ken Price (Lib)	James Searle	Victoria Maxwell	Steve Serpell	Richard Woolley	Matthew Bansemer (Ind); Marilyn Nuske (Ind); Wayne Taylor (LCA)
Bentleigh	Labor	**Nick Staikos**	Debbie Taylor-Haynes (Lib)	Alana Galli-McRostie	David Harris	Paul Ryan	–	Simon Gnieslaw (Ind)
Berwick	Liberal	Malik Zaveer	**Brad Battin** (Lib)	Hayley Perry	Katherine Dolheguy	Joel van der Horst	Kerry Haupt	–
Box Hill	Labor	**Paul Hamer**	Nicole Ta-Ei Werner (Lib)	Joanne Shan	Sebastian Folloni	Gary Ong	Alicia Riera	Paul Dean (DLP); Cameron Liston (Ind); Wayne Tseng (Ind)
Brighton	Liberal	Louise Crawford	**James Newbury** (Lib)	Sarah Dekiere	Alicia Walker	Nick Sciola	–	John Casley (Ind); Felicity Frederico (Ind); Sally Gibson (Ind)
Broadmeadows	Labor	Kathleen Matthews-Ward	Baris Duzova (Lib)	Joe Aguilus	Candace Feild	Bienne Tam	–	Mohamed Elmustapha (Ind); Omar Hassan (VS); Arie Huybregts (Ind); Ben Sutter (RP)
Brunswick	Greens	Mike Williams	Minh Quan Nguyen (Lib)	**Tim Read**	Rachel Lamarche-Beauchesne	Lilian Sabry Shaker	–	Shea Evans (RP); Nahui Jimenez (VS); Kenneth Taylor (Ind)
Bulleen	Liberal	Ian Rogers	**Matthew Guy** (Lib)	Kellie Stafford	Elnaz Jafari	Jason Stokes	Voula Patrikios	Sanjeev Sabhlok (Ind)
Bundoora	Labor	**Colin Brooks**	Sahil Tomar (Lib)	Julie O'Brien	Bella Holgate	Ethan Jones	Andrew Lu	Eric Koelmeyer (Ind)
Carrum	Labor	**Sonya Kilkenny**	Bec Buchanan (Lib)	Jayde Lillico	Taylor Macgregor Owen	Jeremy Cameron	Georgia Erevindis	Damian Willis (Ind)
Caulfield	Liberal	Lior Harel	**David Southwick** (Lib)	Rachel Iampolski	Asher Myerson	Lynne Edwell	–	Michael Abelman (LDP); Nomi Kaltmann (Ind)
Clarinda	Labor	**Meng Heang Tak**	Anthony Richardson (Lib)	Jessamine Moffett	Sue Litchfield	Karen Hastings	Steve Wolfe	Hung Vo (Ind); Caroline White (Ind)
Cranbourne	Labor	**Pauline Richards**	Jagdeep Singh (Lib)	Kiran Vempati	Gwynne Brennan	Bradley Harvey	Gerardine Hansen	Chris Norton (DLP); Peter Bernard Philpott (DHJP)
Croydon	Liberal	Sorina Grasso	**David Hodgett** (Lib)	Brendan Powell	Harley McDonald-Eckersall	Dan Nebauer	–	Sophia de Wit (DLP)
Dandenong	Labor	**Gabrielle Williams**	Karen Broadley (Lib)	Matthew Kirwan	Andrew Klop	Audrey Harmse	Anthony Levchenko	Tham Turner (LDP)
Eildon	Liberal	Jane Judd	**Cindy McLeish** (Lib)	Wil Mikelsons	Chloe Bond	Tim Lacey	Joshua Rusic	Kammy Cordner Hunt (Ind); Robert Thornton (Ind)
Eltham	Labor	**Vicki Ward**	Jason McClintock (Lib)	Alex Grimes	Catriona Marshall	Hugh Stubley	–	Leila Karimi (DLP)
Essendon	Labor	**Danny Pearson**	Angelo Baronessa (Lib)	Jared Prentis	Gayle Williams	Margaret Muir	David Wright	Nicholas Hope (RP); Daniel Nair Dadich (VS)
Eureka	Labor	**Michaela Settle**	Paul Tatchell (Lib)	Sam McColl	Wendy Morrison	Adrian Garcia	Antony Giampaolo	Mark Banwell (Ind); Michael Ray (Ind); Nicola Reid (Ind); Tabitha Rickard (DLP)
Euroa	National	Angela Tough	Annabelle Cleeland* (Nat); Brad Hearn (Lib)	James Bennett	Elaine Haddock	Paul Bachelor	Raymond Rowbotham	–
Evelyn	Liberal	Lorna Dent	**Bridget Vallence** (Lib)	Andrew Henley	Jan Heald	Jeanette Dobson	–	Nat De Francesco (Ind); Rosalie De Francesco (Ind)
Footscray	Labor	**Katie Hall**	Emete Joesika (Lib)	Elena Pereyra	Shohre Mansouri Jajaee	Russell Muir		Alan Williams (DLP); Jorge Jorquera (VS)
Frankston	Labor	**Paul Edbrooke**	Michael O'Reilly (Lib)	Emily Green	Elizabeth Johnston	Richard Brown	Dragan Suric	Chrysten Abraham (LDP); Darren Bergwerf (Ind); Henry Kelsall (Ind)
Geelong	Labor	**Christine Couzens**	James Bennett-Hullin (Lib)	Aleisha Smith	Bob Motta	Madeleine Parker-Hill	–	Angela Carr (Ind); Stephen Juhasz (Ind)
Gippsland East	National	Stephen Richardson	**Tim Bull** (Nat)	Nissa Ling	Sally Court	Carl John Fechner	Ed Barnes	Ricky Muir (SFF)
Gippsland South	National	Denise Ryan	**Danny O'Brien** (Nat)	Jay Tiziani-Simpson	Helen Jeges	Paul Furlong	Angela Newnham	Clay Esler (Ind)
Glen Waverley	Liberal	John Mullahy	**Neil Angus** (Lib)	Steph Partridge	Maddy Hance	Kristeen Huisman	Joyce Harris	Scott Marsh (DLP)
Greenvale	Labor	Iwan Walters	Usman Ghani (Lib)	Clara Santa-Isabel	Rosanna Furina	Maria Bengtsson	Lauren Styles	Mutullah Can Yolbulan (VS); Fatma Erciyas (Ind)
Hastings	Liberal	Paul Mercurio	Briony Hutton (Lib)	Paul Saunders	Tyson Jack	Tom Sabo	Felicity Benson	Camille de Wit (DLP); Robert Whitehill (Ind)
Hawthorn	Labor	**John Kennedy**	John Pesutto (Lib)	Nick Savage	Faith Fuhrer	Ken Triantafillis	–	Stratton Bell (DLP); Melissa Lowe (Ind); Richard Peppard (LDP)
Ivanhoe	Labor	**Anthony Carbines**	Bernadette Khoury (Lib)	Emily Bieber	Sonja Ristevski	Sarah Hayward	–	Craig Langdon (Ind)
Kalkallo	Labor	**Ros Spence**	Bikram Singh (Lib)	Muhammad Nisar Ul Murtaza	Frances Lowe	Das Sayer	–	Sergio Monsalve Tobon (VS); Callum John French (Ind); Jimmy George Parel (Ind); Smiley Sandhu (ND)
Kew	Liberal	Lucy Skelton	Jess Wilson (Lib)	Jackie Carter	Ruby Schofield	Ann Seeley	–	Finlay Davis (Ind); Kym Sullivan (Ind); Sophie Torney (Ind)
Kororoit	Labor	Luba Grigorovitch	John Fletcher (Lib)	Ben Chester	Katherine Divita	Melanie Milutinovic	–	Joh Bauch (Ind); Zuzanna Brown (DLP); Jaz Chandok (ND); Belle Gibson (VS)
Lara	Labor	Ella George	Ralph Krein (Lib)	Courtney Gardner	Peter Kelly	Steve Rankine	–	Sarah Hathway (Ind); Maxim Payne (LDP); Ash Taylor (AVP)
Laverton	Labor	**Sarah Connolly**	Raja Reddy (Lib)	Braishna Durzada	Pouya Bagheri	David Fry	Trent Raymond	Rufo Paredes (Ind); Catherine Robertson (VS); Gurneet Soni (ND); Michael Wirth (DLP)
Lowan	National	Mick Monaghan	**Emma Kealy** (Nat)	Richard Lane	Tamasin Ramsay	Robert Coleman	–	Richard Etherton (AVP); Amanda Mead (Ind)
Macedon	Labor	**Mary-Anne Thomas**	Dominic Bonanno (Lib)	Marley McRae McLeod	Iris Bergmann	Chris McCormack	Kerryn Sedgman	Huntly Barton (Ind); Amanda Evezard (PHON)
Malvern	Liberal	Darren Natale	**Michael O'Brien** (Lib)	Mitchell Fuller	Amelia Natoli	Judy Schmidt	–	Steve Stefanopoulos (Ind)
Melbourne	Greens	Rebecca Thistleton	George Palackalody (Lib)	**Ellen Sandell**	Rabin Bangaar	Michael Janson	Steven Smith	Laylah Al-Saimary (Ind); Colleen Bolger (VS); Nicola Foxworthy (RP)
Melton	Labor	**Steve McGhie**	Graham Watt (Lib)	Praise Morris	Fiona Adin-James	Richard Brunt	Tony Dobran	Ashley Alp (DLP); Jarrod Bingham (Ind); Ian Birchall (Ind); Paul Blackborrow (SFF); Lucienne Ciappara (HAP); Samantha Donald (DHJP); Jasleen Kaur (Ind); Jason Perera (Ind)
Mildura	Independent	Stella Zigouras	Jade Benham* (Nat); Paul Matheson (Lib)	Katie Clements	Angylina Zayn	Brad Stratton	Phillippe Brougham	**Ali Cupper** (Ind); Glenn Milne (Ind); Sonia Brymer (Ind); Felicity Sharpe (DLP)
Mill Park	Labor	**Lily D'Ambrosio**	Paige Yap (Lib)	Chris Kearney	Marcia Simons	Craig Anderson	Andrew Filippopoulos	–
Monbulk	Labor	Daniela De Martino	Gareth Ward (Lib)	Michael Ormsby	Leah Folloni	David Higgins	Veronica Barnes	Craig Cole (Ind); Johanna Skelton (Ind)
Mordialloc	Labor	**Tim Richardson**	Phillip Pease (Lib)	Daniel Lessa	Chi Vo	Patrick Lum	Deborah Albrecht	Sarah O'Donnell (Ind); Phil Reid (Ind)
Mornington	Liberal	Georgia Fowler	Chris Crewther (Lib)	Harry Sinclair	Leonie Schween	Ross Hayward	Paul Pettitt	Jane Agirtan (Ind); Kate Lardner (Ind)
Morwell	Independent	Kate Maxfield	Martin Cameron* (Nat); Dale Harriman (Lib)	Rochelle Hine	Jessica McAuliffe	Brendan Clarke	Alexander Maidana	Sharon Gibson (Ind); Allan Hicken (PHON); Tracie Lund (Ind); David Snelling (SFF)
Mulgrave	Labor	**Daniel Andrews**	Michael Piastrino (Lib)	Robert Lim	David Mould	Jane Foreman	Aidan McLindon	Ian Cook (Ind); Howard Lee (Ind); Fotini Theodossopoulou (Ind); Joseph Toscano (Ind); Maree Wood (DLP)
Murray Plains	National	Damien Hurrell	**Peter Walsh** (Nat)	John Brownstein	Glenys Leung	Cameron MacPherson	Katia Bish	Andrea Otto (Ind)
Narracan^{[†]}	Liberal	–	Wayne Farnham (Lib)	Alyssa Weaver	Austin Cram	Brendan Clarke	Leonie Blackwell	Michael Abelman (LDP); Sophia Camille De Wit (DLP); Ian Honey (Ind); Annemarie McCabe (Ind); Casey Murphy (PHON); Tony Wolfe (Ind)
Narre Warren North	Labor	Belinda Wilson	Timothy Dragan (Lib)	Laura McLean	Sheree Gardner	Christine Elkins	Craig Parker	Stephen Capon (Ind); Stephen Matulec (LDP); Monique Ruyter (SFF); Andrew Zmegac (DLP)
Narre Warren South	Labor	**Gary Maas**	Annette Samuel (Lib)	Susanna Moore	Michael Gallagher	Jacqueline Harvey	Geoff Hansen	Tylere Baker-Pearce (Ind); Christine Skrobo (LDP)
Nepean	Labor	**Chris Brayne**	Sam Groth (Lib)	Esther Gleixner	Pamela Engelander	Janny Dijkman	Hank Leine	Charelle Ainslie (Ind); Jay Miller (CPP); Cynthia Skruzny (DLP); Elizabeth Woolcock (Ind)
Niddrie	Labor	**Ben Carroll**	Alan Youhana (Lib)	Declan McGinness	Shannon Meilak	Joanne Garcia	Frank Maugeri	Georgia Grammenos (ND); Holly Kruse (DLP); Brad Reich (VS)
Northcote	Labor	**Kat Theophanous**	Stewart Todhunter (Lib)	Campbell Gome	Tim Oseckas	Kathrine Ashton	Anastacia Ntouni	Anthony Cave (LDP); April Clarke (RP); Kath Larkin (VS)
Oakleigh	Labor	**Steve Dimopoulos**	Jim Grivokostopoulos (Lib)	Hsiang-Han Hsieh	Loraine Fabb	Edward Sok	Anthony Jacobs	Dominique Murphy (Ind); Parashos Kioupelis (Ind)
Ovens Valley	National	Zuvele Leschen	**Tim McCurdy** (Nat)	Zoe Kromar	Aisha Slater	Anna Wise	Mark Bugge	Julian Fidge (LDP)
Pakenham	Labor	Emma Vulin	David Farrelly (Lib)	Michelle Maibaum	Hannah Pledger-Firth	Christopher Gore	Sammi Clarke	Brett Owen (Ind); Sarasadat Sarkeshik (DLP); Angela Siladji (PHON); Rajvir Singh Sagoo (Ind); Elissa Smith (LCA)
Pascoe Vale	Labor	Anthony Cianflone	Tom Wright (Lib)	Angelica Panopoulos	Elizabeth Adams	Richard Cimbaro	–	Sue Bolton (Ind); Margee Glover (RP); Madaleine Hah (VS)
Point Cook	Labor	Mathew Hilakari	Angela Newhouse (Lib)	Shamsher Khan	Terri Beech	Carolyn Cronkwright	Adrian Abdulovski	Rakhi P. Chaudhary (ND); Joe Garra (Ind); Lisa Jane Gatti (TMP); Scott Grimley (DHJP); Daniel Hamman (DLP); Emma Law (HAP); Alex McAulay (VS); Shwetali Sawant (Ind); Larry Zhao (Ind)
Polwarth	Liberal	Hutch Hussein	**Richard Riordan** (Lib)	Hilary McAllister	Elisha Atchison	Hollie Hunter	–	Denes C. Borsos (Ind); Joseph Vincent Remenyi (DHJP)
Prahran	Greens	Wesa Chau	Matthew Lucas (Lib)	**Sam Hibbins**	Alice Le Huray	Ronald Emilsen	–	Alan Menadue (Ind)
Preston	Labor	Nathan Lambert	Amanda Paliouras (Lib)	Patchouli Paterson	Rachel Unicomb	Raouf Soliman	Angelique Matias	Gaetano Greco (Ind); Carmen Lahiff Jenkins (RP); Steph Price (VS); Brian Sanaghan (Ind)
Richmond	Labor	Lauren O'Dwyer	Lucas Moon (Lib)	Gabrielle de Vietri	Lis Viggers	Markus Freiverts	–	Jeremy Cowen (RP); Roz Ward (VS)
Ringwood	Labor	**Will Fowles**	Cynthia Watson (Lib)	Reuben Steen	Nicholas Rowe	Richard Griffith-Jones	Robyn M. Siemer	Gary Ryan (DLP)
Ripon	Liberal	Martha Haylett	**Louise Staley** (Lib)	Earl James	Holly Sitters	Craig George	–	Bernard Quince (Ind); Luke Smith (SFF); Wren Louise Wilson (DHJP)
Rowville	Liberal	Mannie Verma	**Kim Wells** (Lib)	Angelica di Camillo	Diane Glenane	Stephen Burgess	Peterine Smulders	Nicole Seymour (Ind)
Sandringham	Liberal	Bettina Prescott	**Brad Rowswell** (Lib)	Alysia Regan	Barbara Eppingstall	Jill Chalmers	–	Rodney Campbell (Ind); Clarke Martin (Ind); Karla Zmegac (DLP)
Shepparton	Independent	Liam Cowan	Cheryl Hammer (Lib); Kim O'Keeffe* (Nat)	Ian Christoe	Katherine Taylor	Alison White	Diane M. Teasdale	**Suzanna Sheed** (Ind); Sueie McGrath (DLP)
South Barwon	Labor	**Darren Cheeseman**	Andrew Katos (Lib)	Genevieve Dawson-Scott	Naomi Adams	Alan Barron	Simone Tomlinson	Leone Bates (DLP); Jeynelle Marie Dean (DHJP)
South-West Coast	Liberal	Kylie Gaston	**Roma Britnell** (Lib)	Thomas Campbell	Jacinta Anderson	Chris Brunt	–	Carol Altmann (Ind); Jim Doukas (Ind); James Brash Grimley (DHJP); Michael McCluskey (Ind)
St Albans	Labor	**Natalie Suleyman**	Maria Kerr (Lib)	Joel Bentley	Jason Caracassis	Russell Walton	Kim Cullen	Mark Hobart (DLP); Zaffer Mannan (ND); Virginia Tachos (Ind); Van Thanh Rudd (VS)
Sunbury	Labor	**Josh Bull**	Simmone Cottom (Lib)	Richard Burke	Rohanna Mohr	Charles Pace	–	Peter Bayliss (DLP); James Gallagher (VS); Rushi Vijaykumar Patel (ND)
Sydenham	Labor	**Natalie Hutchins**	Joseph Cullia (Lib)	Maggie Ralph	Karina Leung	Marvet Tawadros	Alejandro Ramos	Hajar Chlihi (VS); Jakueline Radovani (DLP)
Tarneit	Labor	Dylan Wight	Preet Singh (Lib)	Clare Miller	Maurita Rahn	Thomas Jeffrey	Erum Maqsood	Aijaz Moinuddin (Ind); Jaydeep Patel (ND); Claudio Uribe (VS)
Thomastown	Labor	**Bronwyn Halfpenny**	Gurdawar Singh (Lib)	Matt Sinapi	Evie Levens	Colleen McNamara	–	Kelly Cvetkova (VS)
Warrandyte	Liberal	Naomi Oakley	**Ryan Smith** (Lib)	Deepak Joshi	Nicola Rae	Richard Vernay	–	Cynthia Pilli (Ind)
Wendouree	Labor	**Juliana Addison**	Samantha McIntosh (Lib)	Ellen Burns	Bryn Hills	Ian Harkness	–	Dianne Colbert (DLP)
Werribee	Labor	**Tim Pallas**	Mia Shaw (Lib)	Jack Boddeke	Josh Segrave	Matthew Emerson	Mark Strother	Patrizia Barcatta (Ind); Kathryn Breakwell (DLP); Trevor Russell Collins (TMP); Karen Hogan (HAP); Paul Hopper (Ind); Heni Cazlynn Kwan (Ind); Sue Munro (VS); Prashant Tandon (ND); Patricia Anne Wicks (DHJP)
Williamstown	Labor	**Melissa Horne**	Daria Kellander (Lib)	Suzette Rodoreda	Patricia Mackevicius	Joshua Mosely	Alexander Ansalone	Rochelle Fisher (DLP); Julien Q. Macandili (VS)
Yan Yean	Labor	Lauren Kathage	Richard Welch (Lib)	Samantha Mason	Ruth Parramore	James Hall	Con Bouroutzis	Mandy Anne Grimley (DHJP); Alexandar Krstic (SFF); Jack Wooldridge (DLP)

== Legislative Council ==
Sitting members are shown in bold text. Tickets that elected at least one MLC are highlighted in the relevant colour. Successful candidates are identified by an asterisk (*).

=== Eastern Victoria ===
The Labor Party was defending two seats. The Liberal/National Coalition was defending two seats. The Shooters, Fishers and Farmers Party was defending one seat.

Labor candidates	Coalition candidates	Greens candidates	Legalise Cannabis candidates	DLP candidates	PHON candidates
1. **Tom McIntosh***; 2. **Harriet Shing***; 3. Jannette Langley; 4. Marg D'Arcy; 5. Amie Templar-Kanshlo	1. Renee Heath* (Lib); 2. **Melina Bath*** (Nat); 3. David Burgess (Lib); 4. Sharn Coombes (Lib); 5. Mick Harrington (Nat)	1. Mat Morgan; 2. Rodrigo Bardales; 3. Adam Frogley; 4. Jessica Wheelock; 5. Lynda Wheelock	1. Thomas Forrest; 2. Mark Smith	1. Phillip Semmel; 2. Catherine Kennedy	1. Warren Pickering; 2. Jeff Waddell
SFF candidates	LDP candidates	Justice candidates	Freedom candidates	AJP candidates	Family First candidates
1. **Jeff Bourman***; 2. Kerrie-Anne Muir	1. Rob McCathie; 2. Samuel Fink	1. Lachlan O'Connell; 2. Ruth Stanfield	1. Greg Hansford; 2. Raymond Akers	1. Austin Cram; 2. Jennifer McAdam	1. Milton Wilde; 2. Natasha Sawtell
Restore Democracy candidates	Reason candidates	UAP candidates	Socialists candidates	Angry Victorians candidates	Companions & Pets candidates
1. Cengiz Coksun; 2. Connie Coksun	1. Dean Barnes; 2. Eve Cash	1. James Unkles; 2. Paul Wilson	1. Richard Mann; 2. Natalie Acreman	1. Shane Casey; 2. Virginia Rizzo; 3. Ben Marshall	1. Sean Eddy; 2. John Hutchinson
Health candidates	Sustainable candidates	New Democrats candidates	TMP candidates	Ungrouped candidate	
1. Kristy Wallace; 2. Tania White	1. Sophie Paterson; 2. Anthony Cresswell	1. Srilakshmi Ajjampura; 2. Komalben Darji; 3. Namrata Shah	1. Mark Dunn; 2. Ralf Troshen	John O'Brien	

=== North Eastern Metropolitan ===
The Labor Party was defending two seats. The Liberal Party was defending two seats. The Transport Matters Party was defending one seat.

Labor candidates	Liberal candidates	Greens candidates	Reason candidates	SFF candidates	Justice candidates
1. **Shaun Leane***; 2. **Sonja Terpstra***; 3. Nildhara Gadani; 4. Rana Javed; 5. Kieran Simpson	1. **Matthew Bach***; 2. Nick McGowan*; 3. Kirsten Langford; 4. Irene Ling; 5. Sally Houget	1. Aiv Puglielli*; 2. Liz Chase; 3. Asher Cookson; 4. Sarah Newman; 5. Sophia Sun	1. Nina Springle; 2. Francis Cairns	1. Chris Banhidy; 2. Hugh Hanson	1. Judith Thompson; 2. Annette Philpott
AJP candidates	Sustainable candidates	Health candidates	Socialists candidates	TMP candidates	LDP candidates
1. Chris Delforce; 2. Angel Aleksov	1. Jack Corcoran; 2. Willian Clow	1. Leesa Munro; 2. Andrew Hicks	1. Lucas Moore; 2. Lillian Kopschewa	1. **Rod Barton**; 2. Kim Guest	1. Maya Tesa; 2. Josh Lay
DLP candidates	PHON candidates	UAP candidates	Family First candidates	Freedom candidates	Legalise Cannabis candidates
1. Hugh Dolan; 2. James Tra; 3. George Tsingopoulos; 4. Brenton van der Ende	1. Peter Richardson; 2. Willian Turner	1. Nathan Scaglione; 2. Irene Zivkovic	1. Alister Cameron; 2. Nina van Strijp	1. Greg Cheeseman; 2. Daniella Heatherich	1. Anna Negri; 2. Nicholas Wallis
Angry Victorians candidates	Restore Democracy candidates	Companions and Pets candidates	New Democrats candidates		
1. Wally Edwards; 2. Joe Gianfriddo	1. Husyin Cobankara; 2. Serife Cobankara	1. Julia Jones; 2. Craig Read	1. Darshan Lal; 2. Pushpdeep Singh; 3. Rajat Garg		

=== Northern Metropolitan ===
The Labor Party was defending two seats. The Liberal Party was defending one seat. The Greens were defending one seat. The Reason Party was defending one seat.

Labor candidates	Liberal candidates	Greens candidates	Reason candidates	SFF candidates	Justice candidates
1. **Sheena Watt***; 2. **Enver Erdogan***; 3. Susie Byers; 4. Chloe Gaul; 5. Ramy Aljalil	1. Evan Mulholland*; 2. Owen Guest; 3. Hafiz Qadeer; 4. Tim Staker-Gunn; 5. Melinda Tempany	1. **Samantha Ratnam***; 2. Sarah Jefford; 3. Esther Kennedy; 4. Michael Leach; 5. Kenna Morrison	1. **Fiona Patten**; 2. Marcella Brassett; 3. Jenn Clark; 4. Tali Jagielski; 5. Judy Ryan	1. Ethan Constantinou; 2. Ben Podger	1. Thomas Stanfield; 2. Simone Philpott-Smart
AJP candidates	Socialists candidates	Health candidates	Sustainable candidates	DLP candidates	LDP candidates
1. Leah Horsfall; 2. Bruce Poon	1. Jerome Small; 2. Cathy Lewis	1. Lisa Taggart; 2. Gabrielle Brody	1. Alison Pridham; 2. Darryl Budgeon	1. **Adem Somyurek***; 2. Cary de Wit	1. Paul Silverberg; 2. Rachel Versteegen
TMP candidates	PHON candidates	UAP candidates	Family First candidates	Freedom candidates	Legalise Cannabis candidates
1. Georgia Diamantopoulos; 2. Francesco Raco	1. Matthew Considine; 2. Jessica Davis	1. Kelly Moran; 2. Scott McCamish	1. Imad Hirmiz; 2. Denise Lowry	1. Damien Richardson; 2. Cameron Stoddart	1. Andrew Hale; 2. Renee Thompson
Angry Victorians candidates	Restore Democracy candidates	Companions and Pets candidates	New Democrats candidates	Ungrouped Candidates	
1. Jake Cashion; 2. Nickee Freeman	1. Hatice Yesilagac; 2. Berke Yolcu	1. Pauline Gruntzer; 2. Linda Pullen	1. Vikram Bhinder; 2. Amita Ros; 3. Pushpinder Singh	Colin Mancell	

=== Northern Victoria ===
The Labor Party was defending two seats. The Liberal/National Coalition was defending one seat. Derryn Hinch's Justice Party was defending one seat. The Liberal Democratic Party was defending one seat.

Labor candidates	Coalition candidates	Greens candidates	SFF candidates	Reason candidates	Justice candidates
1. **Jaclyn Symes***; 2. James McWhinney; 3. Gareth Mills; 4. Rahn Krammaer; 5. Mitch Bridges	1. **Wendy Lovell*** (Lib); 2. Gaelle Broad* (Nat); 3. Amanda Millar (Lib); 4. Rob Amos (Nat); 5. Jillian Merkel (Lib)	1. Cate Sinclair; 2. Robin Chapman; 3. Rosemary Storey; 4. Ralf Thesing; 5. Lenka Thompson	1. Josh Knight; 2. Peter Watkins	1. Melanie Sharp; 2. Callum Chapman	1. **Tania Maxwell**; 2. John Herron
Sustainable candidates	Socialists candidates	AJP candidates	Health candidates	TMP candidates	LDP candidates
1. Ian Chivers; 2. Allen Doenson	1. Karen Hocking; 2. Emma Dynes	1. Georgie Purcell*; 2. Michelle McGoldrick	1. Kim Warner; 2. Shaun Moran	1. Scott Cowie; 2. Neil Cullen	1. **Tim Quilty**; 2. Tim Molesworth
DLP candidates	PHON candidates	UAP candidates	Family First candidates	Freedom candidates	Legalise Cannabis candidates
1. Mark Royal; 2. Ross McPhee	1. Rikkie-Lee Tyrrell*; 2. Nadine Edwards-Scott	1. Geoff Shaw; 2. Elijah Suares	1. Michael White; 2. Carol Norton-Smith	1. Christopher Neil; 2. Henk Wallenborn	1. Christopher McInally; 2. Adam Miller
Angry Victorians candidates	Restore Democracy candidates	Companions and Pets candidates	New Democrats candidates		
1. Mark Jones; 2. Melanie Tomlin	1. Yasemin Ceylan; 2. Mukadder Orhan	1. Laura Barnes; 2. Robert Britton	1. Brijesh Chopra; 2. Kuldeep Der; 3. Erin Sharma; 4. Ravinder Rana		

=== South Eastern Metropolitan ===
The Labor Party was defending three seats, although MLC Adem Somyurek resigned his membership in 2020 and later sat as an independent before joining the DLP. The Liberal Party was defending one seat. The Liberal Democratic Party was defending one seat.

Labor candidates	Liberal candidates	Greens candidates	Reason candidates	SFF candidates	Justice candidates
1. **Lee Tarlamis***; 2. Michael Galea*; 3. **Tien Kieu**; 4. Imran Khan; 5. Katrina Sullivan	1. Ann-Marie Hermans*; 2. Manjunatha Hanumantharayappa; 3. Michael Keane; 4. Antonietta Moricca; 5. Samuel Lyndon	1. Alex Breskin; 2. Dewani Harahap; 3. Karen Jones; 4. Louisa Willoughby; 5. Janet Wong	1. Martin Leahy; 2. Ethan Mileikowski	1. Will Healy; 2. Grant Poulton	1. Derryn Hinch; 2. Mohit Dwivedi
Sustainable candidates	TMP candidates	Socialists candidates	DLP candidates	Health candidates	AJP candidates
1. Brandon Hoult; 2. Steven Armstrong	1. Norm Dunn; 2. Toni Peters	1. Lavanya Thavaraja; 2. Jaynaya Travis	1. Jen Bowden; 2. Khalif White	1. Geraldine Gonsalvez; 2. Kate Lukis	1. Bronwyn Currie; 2. Davina Hinkley
LDP candidates	PHON candidates	UAP candidates	Family First candidates	Freedom candidates	Legalise Cannabis candidates
1. **David Limbrick***; 2. Ethelyn King	1. Beth Stevens; 2. Cyndi Marr	1. Matt Babet; 2. Jatinder Singh	1. Lee Jones; 2. Colleen Hayward	1. Morgan Jonas; 2. Rebekah Spelman	1. Rachel Payne*; 2. Jeffrey Knipe
Angry Victorians candidates	Restore Democracy candidates	Companions and Pets candidates	New Democrats candidates	Ungrouped Candidates	
1. Barry Minster; 2. George Moliviatis	1. Daniel Puscasu; 2. Rodica Puscasu Ianculescu	1. Wendy Hutchinson; 2. Marissa Sarif	1. Bhaveshkumar Lakhatariya; 2. Bhavika Patel; 3. Satinder Singh; 4. Nilam Panchal	Mehdi Sayed	

=== Southern Metropolitan ===
The Labor Party was defending two seats. The Liberal Party was defending two seats. Sustainable Australia was defending one seat.

Labor candidates	Liberal candidates	Greens candidates	Reason candidates	SFF candidates	Justice candidates
1. John Berger*; 2. Ryan Batchelor*; 3. Clive Crosby; 4. Lynn Psaila; 5. Muhammad Shabazz	1. **David Davis***; 2. **Georgie Crozier***; 3. Nick Stavrou; 4. Monica Clark; 5. Andrew Litwinow	1. Katherine Copsey*; 2. John Friend-Perera; 3. Anna Parker; 4. Kylie Rocha; 5. Shanae Rowick	1. Andrew Johnson; 2. Stephen Jasper	1. Nicole Bourmann; 2. Michelle Collyer	1. Michele Dale; 2. Ellie Sullivan
AJP candidates	DLP candidates	Health candidates	Sustainable candidates	Socialists candidates	TMP candidates
1. Ben Schultz; 2. Mia Davies	1. Theodore Tsiongas; 2. Dean Chambers	1. Kellie Thomas; 2. Mark Lambrick	1. **Clifford Hayes**; 2. Bettina Terry	1. Jack Todaro; 2. Liam Kruger	1. Marc Peters; 2. Paul Tammesild
LDP candidates	PHON candidates	UAP candidates	Family First candidates	Freedom candidates	Legalise Cannabis candidates
1. Matthew Ford; 2. David Segal	1. Craig Pickering; 2. Chris Bradbury	1. Leon Kofmansky; 2. Ronald Jean	1. Vickie Janson; 2. Alex Van Der End	1. Natasha Kons; 2. Madeleine Kons	1. Ben Howman; 2. Marc Selan
Angry Victorians candidates	Restore Democracy candidates	Companions and Pets candidates	New Democrats candidates		
1. Dean Hurlston; 2. Robert Kamp	1. Reyhan Adanir; 2. Nursin Akdogan	1. Joan Molyneux; 2. Max Winch	1. Krishna Brahmbhatt; 2. Jigarkumar Chaudhary; 3. Ravinder Marwaha		

=== Western Metropolitan ===
The Labor Party was defending three seats, although MLC Kaushaliya Vaghela was disendorsed and later sat as an independent before forming the New Democrats. The Liberal Party was defending one seat, although MLC Bernie Finn was expelled from the party in May 2022 and later joined the Democratic Labour Party. Derryn Hinch's Justice Party was defending one seat, although MLC Catherine Cumming defected from the party prior to taking her seat in the Legislative Council and later sat as an independent.

Labor candidates	Liberal candidates	Greens candidates	Reason candidates	SFF candidates	Justice candidates
1. Lizzie Blandthorn*; 2. **Ingrid Stitt***; 3. **Cesar Melhem**; 4. Cuc Lam; 5. Nurul Khan	1. Moira Deeming*; 2. Trung Luu*; 3. Golam Haque; 4. Luan Walker; 5. Manish Patel	1. Bernadette Thomas; 2. Sarah Bray; 3. Lloyd Davies; 4. Isabella McRae McLeod; 5. Pierre Vairo	1. David Thirkettle-Watts; 2. Harry Millward	1. Geoff Ashby; 2. Ken Vickers	1. Peter Sullivan; 2. Jean-Marie D'Argent
DLP candidates	Health candidates	Sustainable candidates	TMP candidates	Socialists candidates	AJP candidates
1. **Bernie Finn**; 2. Thuy Kim Le	1. Isaac Golden; 2. Leiah Golden	1. Bert Jessup; 2. Dennis Bilic	1. Greg Collins; 2. Daniel Lowinger	1. Liz Walsh; 2. Aran Mylvaganam	1. Meg Watkins; 2. Nat Kopas
LDP candidates	PHON candidates	UAP candidates	Family First candidates	Freedom candidates	Legalise Cannabis candidates
1. Anthony Cursio; 2. Liam Roche	1. Ursula Van Bree; 2. Frank Vrionis	1. Andrew Cuthbertson; 2. Deepak Bansal	1. Darren Buller; 2. Mary Filmer	1. John McBride; 2. Dan McBride	1. David Ettershank*; 2. Raffaela Menter
Angry Victorians candidates	Restore Democracy candidates	Companions and Pets candidates	New Democrats candidates	Ungrouped Candidates	
1. **Catherine Cumming**; 2. Adam Robinson; 3. Jennifer Zalme	1. Samson Palkuri; 2. Burcin Yalaz	1. Mary Britton; 2. Craig Treherne	1. **Kaushaliya Vaghela**; 2. Arix Bishnoi; 3. Yogesh Malhotra; 4. Anitha Palkuri; 5. Mohammed Shaik	Fred Ackerman; Walter Villagonzalo; Sam Alcordo; Mark Barrow; Esther Demian	

=== Western Victoria ===
The Labor Party is defending two seats, however incumbent Labor MLC Jaala Pulford retired close to the election. The Liberal/National Coalition is defending one seat. Derryn Hinch's Justice Party is defending one seat. The Animal Justice Party is defending one seat.

Labor candidates	Coalition candidates	Greens candidates	SFF candidates	Reason candidates	Justice candidates
1. Jacinta Ermacora*; 2. **Gayle Tierney***; 3. Megan Bridger-Darling; 4. Sue Pavlovich; 5. Heather Stokes	1. **Beverley McArthur*** (Lib); 2. Joe McCracken* (Lib); 3. Anita Rank (Nat); 4. Angela Shearman (Lib); 5. Robert Letts (Nat)	1. Sarah Mansfield*; 2. Judith Baldacchino; 3. John Barnes; 4. Eva van der Vlies; 5. Linda Zibell	1. Ben Collyer; 2. Greame Standen	1. Emma Sinclair; 2. Olivia Hurley	1. **Stuart Grimley**; 2. Simone O'Brien
DLP candidates	Sustainable candidates	Socialists candidates	TMP candidates	AJP candidates	LDP candidates
1. Costa Di Baise; 2. Ron Skruzny	1. Madeleine Wearne; 2. Robert Pascoe	1. Madilyn Gorman; 2. Abbey Randal	1. Eddie Dunn; 2. Antonela Kearns	1. **Andy Meddick**; 2. Hannah Wilshier	1. Julia McGrath; 2. Paul Barker
Health candidates	PHON candidates	UAP candidates	Family First candidates	Freedom candidates	Legalise Cannabis candidates
1. Con Lazos; 2. Angelica Brennfleck	1. Terri Pryse-Smith; 2. Sabine De Pyle	1. Natalie Failla; 2. Keith Raymond	1. Dean Cronkwright; 2. Chioma Ikeh	1. Tony Kovac; 2. Vanessa Kovac	1. Andrew Dowling; 2. Melanie Humphrey
Angry Victorians candidates	Restore Democracy candidates	Companions and Pets candidates	New Democrats candidates	Ungrouped Candidates	
1. Chris Burson; 2. Richard Beeck	1. Jake Finnigan; 2. Ismail Celikdogen; 3. Sinan Orhan	1. Geoff Collins; 2. Simone Fisher	1. Hardik Dave; 2. Cecilia Gomez Benitez; 3. Jaymik Patel; 4. Vijaykumar Kachhia	Storm Hellmuth	

== Resignations and disendorsements ==
Date	Party	Candidate	Seat	Details
4 July 2022	Labor	Kacie Duncan	Morwell	Replaced by Kate Maxfield.
13 August 2022	Victorians	Greg Brown	Ovens Valley	Party disbanded.
13 August 2022	Victorians	Philip Le Liu		Party disbanded.
13 August 2022	Victorians	Ingrid Maynard	Eastern Victoria	Party disbanded.
13 August 2022	Victorians	Helen Pavlidis-Mihalakos		Party disbanded.
13 August 2022	Victorians	Gabriel Rossi	Western Metropolitan	Party disbanded.
13 August 2022	Victorians	Joanne Tadmore		Party disbanded.
13 August 2022	Victorians	Oscar Yildiz	Northern Metropolitan	Party disbanded.
12 October 2022	Independent Liberal	Ben Lucas	Narracan	Withdrew and endorsed Liberal candidate Wayne Farnham.
October 2022	Independent	Aaron Lim	Richmond	Withdrew for reasons unknown.
Pre-mid-November 2022	Freedom	Nick Clonaridis	Eastern Victoria	Withdrew for reasons unknown.
Pre-mid-November 2022	Conservative	Vern Hughes	Eastern Victoria	Withdrew for reasons unknown.

== Notes ==
^{†} Shaun Gilchrist, the Nationals candidate for the district of Narracan, died on 20 November 2022. This resulted in the election being declared as "failed" by the VEC, and a supplementary election was held on 28 January 2023 for which parties and candidates had to re-register. The original candidate list was: Justin Seddon (Labor), Wayne Farnham (Liberal), Shaun Gilchrist (Nationals), Alyssa Weaver (Greens), Laura Rees (AJP), Hannah Darts (Family First), Leonie Blackwell (Freedom), Casey Murphy (PHON), Tony Wolfe (Independent).
