= Electoral results for the district of Tullamarine =

Victoria, Australia, district election results

This is a list of electoral results for the electoral district of Tullamarine in Victorian state elections.

== Members for Tullamarine ==
| Member | Party | Term |
|---|---|---|
| Bernie Finn | Liberal Party | 1992–1999 |
| Liz Beattie | Labor Party | 1999–2002 |

== Election results ==
=== Elections in the 1990s ===
==== 1999 ====
1999 Victorian state election: Tullamarine
| Party | Candidate | Votes | % | ±% |
|---|---|---|---|---|
| Labor | Liz Beattie | 18,346 | 50.6 | +6.5 |
| Liberal | Bernie Finn | 15,561 | 42.9 | −5.4 |
| Greens | Pat Fraser | 996 | 2.7 | +2.7 |
| Shooters | Russell Grenfell | 719 | 2.0 | +2.0 |
| Democratic Labor | John Mulholland | 668 | 1.8 | +1.8 |
| Total formal votes | | 36,290 | 96.8 | −1.0 |
| Informal votes | | 1,210 | 3.2 | +1.0 |
| Turnout | | 37,500 | 94.6 | |
Two-party-preferred result
| Labor | Liz Beattie | 19,502 | 53.8 | +6.8 |
| Liberal | Bernie Finn | 16,751 | 46.2 | −6.8 |
| Labor gain from Liberal | | Swing | +6.8 | |

==== 1996 ====
1996 Victorian state election: Tullamarine
| Party | Candidate | Votes | % | ±% |
|---|---|---|---|---|
| Liberal | Bernie Finn | 16,319 | 48.3 | +4.1 |
| Labor | David White | 14,882 | 44.0 | +4.0 |
| Independent | Dot White | 2,235 | 6.6 | +6.6 |
| Natural Law | Theo Andriopoulos | 351 | 1.0 | +1.0 |
| Total formal votes | | 33,787 | 97.7 | +2.2 |
| Informal votes | | 784 | 2.3 | −2.2 |
| Turnout | | 15,858 | 47.0 | −1.5 |
Two-party-preferred result
| Liberal | Bernie Finn | 17,887 | 53.0 | +1.5 |
| Labor | David White | 15,858 | 47.0 | −1.5 |
| Liberal hold | | Swing | +1.5 | |

==== 1992 ====
1992 Victorian state election: Tullamarine
| Party | Candidate | Votes | % | ±% |
|---|---|---|---|---|
| Liberal | Bernie Finn | 13,032 | 44.2 | +2.3 |
| Labor | Peter Gavin | 11,823 | 40.1 | −11.9 |
| Independent | Jack Ogilvie | 1,511 | 5.1 | +5.1 |
| Independent | Veronica Burgess | 1,235 | 4.2 | +4.2 |
| Independent | Cheryl Hildebrandt | 1,207 | 4.1 | +4.1 |
| Independent | Andy Govanstone | 703 | 2.4 | +2.4 |
| Total formal votes | | 29,511 | 95.5 | −0.3 |
| Informal votes | | 1,385 | 4.5 | +0.3 |
| Turnout | | 30,896 | 96.0 | |
Two-party-preferred result
| Liberal | Bernie Finn | 15,158 | 51.5 | +6.4 |
| Labor | Peter Gavin | 14,264 | 48.5 | −6.4 |
| Liberal gain from Labor | | Swing | +6.4 | |
