= Electoral results for the district of Yuroke =

Australian district election results

This is a list of electoral results for the Electoral district of Yuroke in Victorian state elections.

== Members for Yuroke ==
Member	Party	Term
Liz Beattie	Labor	2002–2014
Ros Spence	Labor	2014–2022

== Election results ==
=== Elections in the 2010s ===
2018 Victorian state election: Yuroke
Party	Candidate	Votes	%	±%
Labor	Ros Spence	28,519	59.42	+5.33
Liberal	Jim Overend	12,692	26.44	+2.83
Greens	Louise Sampson	3,070	6.40	+0.38
Independent	Golda Zogheib	2,102	4.38	+4.38
Victorian Socialists	Emma Dook	1,612	3.36	+3.36
Total formal votes		47,995	93.11	−0.39
Informal votes		3,549	6.89	+0.39
Turnout		51,544	88.76	−3.68
Two-party-preferred result
Labor	Ros Spence	33,730	70.26	+1.74
Liberal	Jim Overend	14,278	29.74	−1.74
Labor hold		Swing	+1.74	

2014 Victorian state election: Yuroke
Party	Candidate	Votes	%	±%
Labor	Ros Spence	20,484	54.1	−2.2
Liberal	Phulvinderjit Grewal	8,943	23.6	−6.7
Christians	Imad Hirmiz	2,689	7.1	+7.1
Greens	Natalie Abboud	2,277	6.0	−3.2
Family First	Rodney Le Nepveu	1,868	4.9	+0.8
Independent	Mick Wilkins	1,606	4.2	+4.2
Total formal votes		37,867	93.5	−0.1
Informal votes		2,632	6.5	+0.1
Turnout		40,499	92.4	+7.3
Two-party-preferred result
Labor	Ros Spence	25,839	68.5	+2.5
Liberal	Phulvinderjit Grewal	11,869	31.5	−2.5
Labor hold		Swing	+2.5	

2010 Victorian state election: Yuroke
Party	Candidate	Votes	%	±%
Labor	Liz Beattie	23,537	55.22	−7.99
Liberal	Philip Cutler	13,259	31.11	+7.18
Greens	Graham Dawson	4,128	9.68	+2.12
Family First	Ian Cranson	1,702	3.99	−1.30
Total formal votes		42,626	93.68	−1.42
Informal votes		2,876	6.32	+1.42
Turnout		45,502	93.96	−0.35
Two-party-preferred result
Labor	Liz Beattie	27,841	65.29	−4.90
Liberal	Philip Cutler	14,802	34.71	+4.90
Labor hold		Swing	−4.90	

=== Elections in the 2000s ===
2006 Victorian state election: Yuroke
Party	Candidate	Votes	%	±%
Labor	Liz Beattie	23,531	63.2	−8.1
Liberal	Cathy Finn	8,909	23.9	−2.4
Greens	Belinda Connell	2,814	7.6	+7.6
Family First	George Barrett	1,970	5.3	+5.3
Total formal votes		37,224	95.1	−0.8
Informal votes		1,916	4.9	+0.8
Turnout		39,140	94.3	
Two-party-preferred result
Labor	Liz Beattie	26,126	70.2	−2.7
Liberal	Cathy Finn	11,095	29.8	+2.7
Labor hold		Swing	−2.7	

2002 Victorian state election: Yuroke
Party	Candidate	Votes	%	±%
Labor	Liz Beattie	23,161	71.3	+14.8
Liberal	Robert Dunstan	8,531	26.3	−11.9
Citizens Electoral Council	Tanzie Chowdhury	805	2.5	+2.5
Total formal votes		32,497	95.9	−0.4
Informal votes		1,404	4.1	+0.4
Turnout		33,901	94.3	
Two-party-preferred result
Labor	Liz Beattie	23,683	72.9	+13.9
Liberal	Robert Dunstan	8,813	27.1	−13.9
Labor hold		Swing	+13.9	
