= Kaushaliya Vaghela =

Australian politician

Secretary of the New Democrats
- Incumbent
- Assumed office 2022
- Preceded by: Position established

Member of the Victorian Legislative Council for the Western Metropolitan Region
- In office 24 November 2018 – 26 November 2022
- Preceded by: Colleen Hartland; Huong Truong
- Succeeded by: David Ettershank

Personal details
- Born: Kaushaliya Virjibhai Vaghela Jamnagar, Gujarat, India
- Citizenship: Australian
- Party: New Democrats (since 2022); Independent (2022); Labor (until 2022)
- Spouse: Dinesh Chauhan
- Parents: Virjibhai Vaghela (father); Yamunaben Gohil (mother)
- Education: RMIT University
- Occupation: Research Assistant; Part Time Ministerial Advisor; Politician
- Website: kaushaliyavaghela.com.au

Kaushaliya Virjibhai Vaghela is an Australian former politician. She was a member of the Victorian Legislative Council from 2018 to 2022, representing the Western Metropolitan Region. She is the second Indian-born member of the Victorian Parliament after Thomas Livingstone Learmonth, and is a Hindu. Before her preselection in 2018, she briefly worked as a part-time adviser to then-State Minister for Multicultural Affairs, Robin Scott.

== Resignation from the ALP ==
On 9 February 2022, Vaghela crossed the floor in support of Adem Somyurek's motion to refer the Andrews government to the Victorian Ombudsman in relation to the alleged misuse of taxpayer funds, involving the diversion of parliamentary staffing resources to political campaigning and party factional activities prior to the 2014 Victorian state election.

In March 2022, Vaghela resigned from Labor, making serious allegations of bullying against the party. Her criticisms were aired after she had been left off the Labor ticket for the 2022 state election, following an investigation by the Independent Broad-based Anti-corruption Commission (IBAC) into the conduct of her husband, Dinesh Chauhan, and staff members.

== New Democrats party ==
In August 2022, Vaghela announced that she had formed the New Democrats party, with her as its secretary. After the party gained registration with the Victorian Electoral Commission in October 2022, she claimed that almost 2,000 people had joined in response to her appeal for support.

Vaghela was defeated at the 2022 state election, polling 0.5%. The New Democrats polled 0.2% across Victoria.

== See also ==
- Gaurav Sharma (similar case in New Zealand)
