= Andrew Elsbury =

Australian politician (born 1979)

Member of the Victorian Legislative Council
- In office 27 November 2010 – 29 November 2014

Personal details
- Born: 7 March 1979 (age 47)
- Party: West Party
- Other political affiliations: Liberal (until 2022)

Andrew Warren Elsbury (born 7 March 1979) is an Australian former politician who represented the Liberal Party in the Western Metropolitan Region in the Victorian Legislative Council from 2010 to 2014. Prior to his election to the Parliament of Victoria he was an Advisor to Senator Michael Ronaldson. On 24 November 2014, Elsbury lost his Legislative Council seat to Dr Rachel Carling-Jenkins of the Democratic Labour Party in the 2014 Victorian state election. He quit the Liberal Party in 2022 in protest of its drift toward the religious and right. Elsbury cited the preselection of right-wing candidate Moira Deeming at the top of the Liberal Party’s ticket for the Western Metropolitan Region, describing it as ‘the last straw.’

Elsbury is standing at the 2026 state election for The West Party, contesting the district of Tarneit.
