= Moira Deeming =

Australian politician

Moira Deeming MLC
- Deeming at a candidate forum in 2026

Member of the Victorian Legislative Council for the Western Metropolitan Region
- Incumbent
- Assumed office 26 November 2022

Councillor of the City of Melton
- In office 5 November 2020 – 21 December 2022
- Succeeded by: Justine Farrugia
- Constituency: Watts Ward

Personal details
- Party: Family First (2026–present)
- Other political affiliations: Independent (2026); Independent Liberal (2023–2024); Liberal (2022–2023, 2024–2026)
- Children: 4
- Education: La Trobe University; University of Melbourne
- Occupation: Politician
- Website: Personal website Electorate website Party website

Moira Deeming is an Australian politician and member of the Victorian Legislative Council, the upper house of the Parliament of Victoria, for the Western Metropolitan Region since November 2022. She previously sat as a councillor for the Melton City Council representing the Watts Ward.

Deeming is known for her views on transgender people. On 18 March 2023, she spoke at an anti-trans rally, which she helped organise, outside of the Victorian Parliament. The rally was attended by a neo-Nazi group who repeatedly performed Nazi salutes from the steps of Parliament.

Following Deeming's participation in the rally, then-leader of the opposition John Pesutto announced that he would move to have her expelled from the parliamentary Liberal Party. On 27 March 2023, Deeming was suspended from the parliamentary Liberal Party for nine months. After repeated legal threats against Pesutto, she was indefinitely expelled from the parliamentary party room on 12 May 2023. In December 2024 the Federal Court ruled that Pesutto had defamed Deeming by suggesting that she associates with Nazis. Deeming was readmitted to the parliamentary Liberal Party on 27 December 2024. On 17 July 2026, she had her Liberal Party endorsement for the 2026 election revoked. She withdrew her Liberal Party membership on 28 July.

== Early life, personal life and education ==
In Deeming's maiden speech in the Legislative Council, she said that she was "born and bred on the political left coming from a long line of union leaders, card-carrying Labor Party members, and Labor MPs". Her great-grandfather, John Joseph Holland, was a Labor MP for more than thirty-five years and a City of Melbourne councillor.

Deeming identifies as Māori and a Presbyterian. She attended the Catholic high school St. Francis Xavier College, and received Bachelor of International Relations from La Trobe University and a Post-Graduate Diploma of Education from the University of Melbourne. Deeming previously worked as a teacher for over a decade.

== Political career ==
During the 2014 Victorian state election, Deeming stood as a candidate for the Liberal Party for the seat of St Albans in the lower house. She secured 26.9% of the vote, losing to the Labor Party's Natalie Suleyman. At the 2018 state election Deeming stood as a candidate for the Liberal Party for the upper house Western Metropolitan Region seat in the Victorian Legislative Council. She received 356 first preference votes (0.08%) and failed to gain a seat.

Deeming stood as a candidate for Watts Ward at the 2020 Melton local election on 24 October, receiving 21.49% of the primary vote and successfully securing the second allocation. Following the 2022 Australian federal election, it was reported in The Age that on 26 March the Victorian Liberal Party's administrative committee voted for Deeming to run in the lower house seat of Gorton. Before she was able to be endorsed, a top party official relayed the view of, then Prime Minister of Australia, Scott Morrison's Office that "negative media coverage of Deeming's hard-line social views could distract" from Morrison's campaign. Subsequently, another vote was held and a different candidate was picked.

On 23 July 2022, Deeming was endorsed by the Liberal Party to contest the upper house Western Metropolitan Region seat in the Victorian Legislative Council to replace Bernie Finn at the Victorian state election. Her preselection was considered controversial because she replaced the similarly right-wing Bernie Finn at the top of the Liberal ticket, following Finn's expulsion from the Liberal Party after making "inflammatory social media posts". Finn, who contested the election as a Democratic Labour Party candidate, was reported to be "delighted" at Deeming's preselection. Andrew Elsbury, a moderate Liberal Party member who held the seat from 2010 to 2014 quit the party in response to her preselection, describing it as the "final straw". Deeming was subsequently elected to the Legislative Council.

=== Anti-trans rally ===
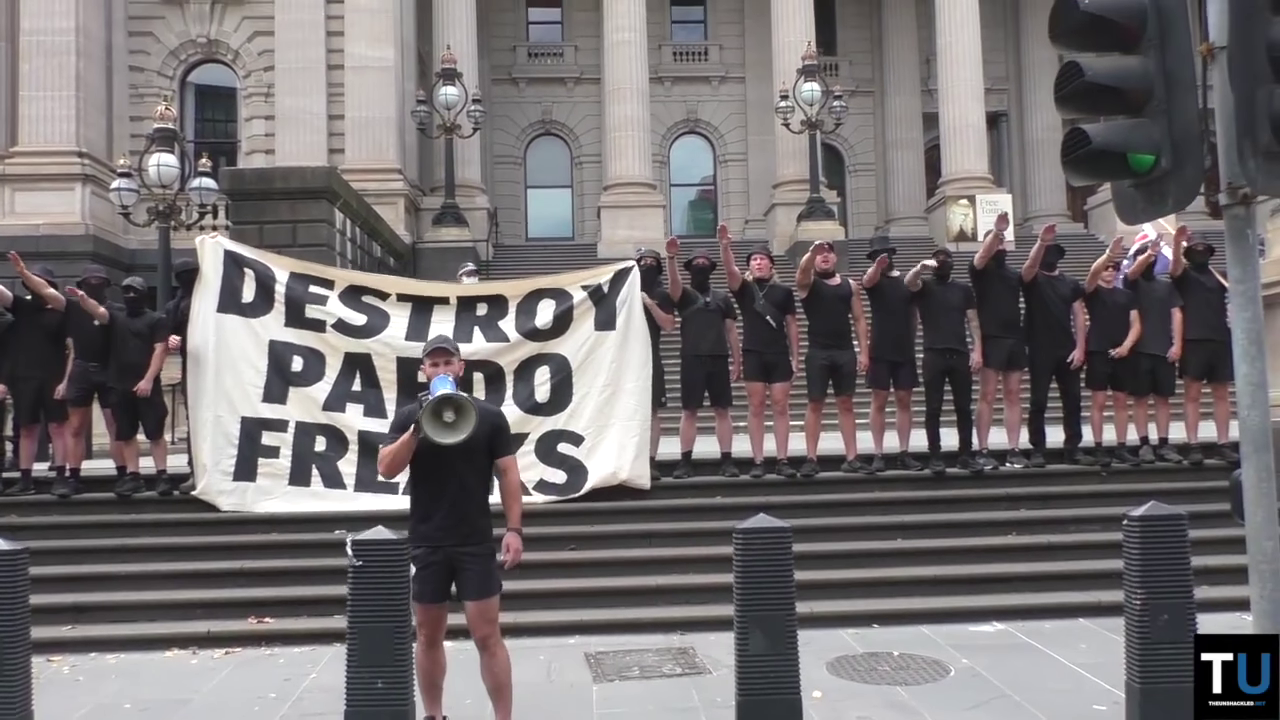
Members of the National Socialist Network performing Nazi salutes on 18 March 2023

On 18 March 2023, Deeming spoke at an anti-trans rally in Melbourne, which she co-organised with British anti-transgender rights activist Kellie-Jay Keen-Minshull. The rally was also attended by the neo-Nazi group National Socialist Network (NSN) and its leader Thomas Sewell. The neo-Nazis repeatedly engaged in Nazi salutes and carried far-right extremist banners (including one that compared transgender people to paedophiles), which sparked clashes with counter protesters who attended the rally. Deeming later said that she had noticed the neo-Nazi group, but said she was told there was "nothing [they] could do" about their presence, and that she "just got back to [the] rally". She denied seeing the group perform salutes. She also said that she struggles to remember the anti-trans rally she helped organise.

In a public statement Liberal opposition leader John Pesutto described Deeming's position as "untenable" due to her "involvement in organising, promoting and participating in a rally with speakers and other organisers who themselves have been publicly associated with far right-wing extremist groups including neo-Nazi activists". Pesutto then moved to expel her from the party. MPs Brad Battin and Richard Riordan supported her and attempted to delay a vote on expelling her by a week, but failed, losing the vote 18 to 11. It was reported that Deeming was also supported by Chris Crewther, Matthew Guy, Bill Tilley, David Hodgett, and Ann-Marie Hermans. After failing to delay a vote on Deeming's expulsion, Liberal MPs lobbied Pesutto for a less severe punishment over her role in the rally. Deeming subsequently accepted a nine-month suspension from the party as an alternative to expulsion. The compromise came after Deeming issued a private statement in the party room, condemning Keen-Minshull's previous use of a Barbie wearing a Nazi uniform on her social media as a "poor distasteful joke".

During Deeming's suspension, she threatened party leader Pesutto with legal action, but backed away after a fresh attempt was made to oust her from the party. This second effort was led by former party leader Matthew Guy.

=== Legal action and expulsion from the Liberal party room ===
Deeming again threatened the Liberal Party leader by sending a letter reiterating the threat of a defamation case. On 12 May 2023 she was expelled from the parliamentary party room by 19 votes to 11. Despite her expulsion, Deeming reaffirmed that she would never quit or resign from the party. In an interview with Sky News Australia's Peta Credlin, Deeming stated that she had been "betrayed" by the party and "relentlessly hunted" out of the party room following the anti-trans rally. As a result of Deeming's expulsion, she then sat as an Independent Liberal.

In December 2023, after months of attempted mediation failed, Deeming filled a civil complaint against Pesutto. Deeming stated that she had been falsely accused of being an associate of "neo-Nazi sympathisers and extremists", had been defamed by Pesutto in media releases, a press conference and broadcast interviews. Pesutto denied her claims, stating that he had never called her a "neo-Nazi, white supremacist or anything similar". Pesutto's statement of defence however alleged that Deeming had failed to distance herself from people who had associated with people from the far-right.

During a hearing of the case in September 2024, the court played a secretly recorded audio of a meeting between Deeming, Pesutto, and Pesutto's leadership team, which immediately followed the anti-trans rally and was recorded by David Southwick, Pesutto's deputy. Deeming was lectured for her role in the rally and for having champagne afterwards with Kellie-Jay Keen-Minshull. Deeming's lawyer in court said that the meeting was a "pile-on" and that a decision had already been made to remove her from the party. In December 2024 the Federal Court ruled that Pesutto had defamed Deeming. Pesutto was ordered to pay $300,000 in damages.

=== Re-admission to the Liberal party room ===
As a result of her legal win against Pesutto, Deeming stated that she expected to be able to return to the parliamentary party room. On 20 December 2024, the Liberal party room voted down a proposal to readmit Deeming to the party room. The vote was 14–15, with Pesutto's final vote defeating the motion. On 22 December, Pesutto called for a Liberal party room meeting scheduled on 15 January 2025 to discuss his motion to readmit Deeming, stating that an "absolute majority" now existed to do so. He apologised to Deeming for defaming her, but Deeming said that she learned about the apology from media. On 27 December there was another motion to spill the leadership in the Victorian Liberal Party and readmit Deeming, the latter of which passed.

On 16 May 2025, the Federal Court ordered Pesutto to pay $2.3 million in costs to Deeming, which he failed to do, and on 6 June 2025 Pesutto was served with a bankruptcy notice. Deeming offered to delay the payment on the condition that her preselection for the 2026 state election was guaranteed by the Victorian Liberal Party. An additional offer was made by Deeming's supporter Hilton Grugeon, who offered to loan $1.5 million to Pesutto on the conditions that Deeming's preselection was guaranteed and that, if Pesutto challenged for the leadership of the Liberal party, the loan would immediately be withdrawn, potentially leading to Pesutto's bankruptcy and removal from parliament. Pesutto refused this deal. Deeming's offer was refused by the party which provided Pesutto with a loan of $1.55 million to cover his legal costs. Deeming expressed dismay at the loan which she described as "against the grain of everything we believe as Liberals". Her offer was criticised by former premier Jeff Kennett, who likened it to "blackmail". Deeming was referred to the Independent Broad-based Anti-corruption Commission, Victoria's anti-corruption integrity agency.

=== After re-admission ===
As per a policy introduced by former Victorian Liberal Leader Jeff Kennett, every Victorian Premier who served over 3,000 days in office is mandated to have a statue made of them. Daniel Andrews is the first Premier to meet the requirements of the mandate, and will hence have a statue made of him. However, in August, this attracted criticism from Deeming and fellow Liberal MP Ann-Marie Hermans, both of whom compared him to authoritarian dictators. Deeming created a petition to stop the statue from being built, and compared the Andrews’ government to “authoritarian regimes”, that she said erect statues of living leaders as a “tool of political dominance, of intimidation, like with Lenin or Mao or Hussein”, referring to Victoria's strict lockdown laws. Both Deeming and Hermans attracted criticism, with Battin describing himself as "disappointed and very angry", yet refused to condemn either's comments.

On 27 October 2025, Deeming was promoted to Shadow Assistant Minister for Local Government. She lost preselection for her seat in the Victorian Legislative Council in March 2026,, losing her endorsement as a candidate for the Liberal Party of Australia for the upcoming state election. Shortly after that ballot the winning Liberal candidate, Dinesh Gourisetty, was revealed to have provided a character reference for a man convicted of grooming and sexually assaulting a child, and the Liberal party asked him to withdraw and determined to re-run the ballot. On the re-run, all of Deeming’s opponents withdrew from the ballot, ensuring Deeming was re-selected.

=== Assault allegation ===
In June 2026, Deeming alleged that former Liberal leader Matthew Guy assaulted her at a fundraiser in May 2026. Guy denied the allegations and Victoria Police later closed the case. Following Deeming's refusal to apologise for the allegation, her candidacy for the 2026 state election was revoked by the Liberal party state executive. On 28 July 2026, she resigned from the parliamentary Liberal Party.

=== Family First Party ===
Deeming at a Seabrook election forum in 2026

On 10 September 2026, Deeming announced that she was joining the Family First Party and would be the party's lead candidate for the Western Metropolitan Region at the 2026 state election.

== Political views ==
Deeming is well known for her anti-trans views. In her maiden speech before the Legislative Council, Deeming stated that she was against Victoria's Safe Schools program, transgender people accessing toilets corresponding to their gender, and the decriminalisation of sex work. Deeming has described Safe Schools as "sleazy" and created by "paedophilia apologists". In 2020 she described the "watch and wait" approach for treating gender dysphoria as "highly successful, low risk". In July 2025, Deeming distributed a document claiming that transgender ideology "operates like a cult and harms people in the same way".

Deeming, described as anti-abortion, believes that laws legalising abortion need to be repealed, and thinks that rape victims should reject abortions and turn to the church. She is against voluntary euthanasia. During the COVID-19 pandemic, Deeming was against the COVID-19 vaccine mandates, and considered vaccine passports immoral and a form of segregation. As of September 2021 she said in an interview that she was unvaccinated, waiting, and reserving her judgement due to concerns. Deeming is against changing the date of Australia Day. She is a member of the conservative think-tank Institute of Public Affairs.
