= Huong Truong =

Australian politician

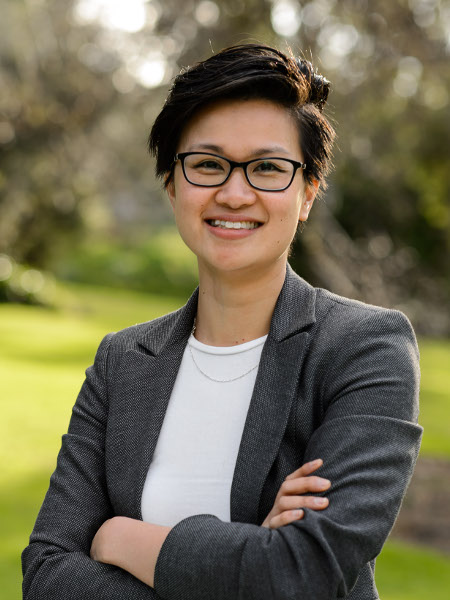

Member of the Victorian Legislative Council for Western Metropolitan Region
- In office 21 February 2018 – 24 November 2018
- Preceded by: Colleen Hartland
- Succeeded by: Kaushaliya Vaghela

Personal details
- Born: 1983 or 1984 (age 41–42) Australia
- Party: Greens
- Website: Huong Truong website

Thi Viet Huong Truong (Vietnamese: Trương Thị Việt Hương) (born 1983 or 1984) is an Australian politician, community organiser, artist who was a Greens member of the Victorian Legislative Council. She represented Western Metropolitan Region from February 2018, when she was appointed to the vacancy resulting from Colleen Hartland's resignation, until her defeat at the 2018 Victorian state election.

== Family ==
Truong's parents came from Vietnam as boat people following the Vietnam War. Her grandparents served in the South Vietnamese Army that fought the Viet Cong in the Vietnam War. In the early 1980s, at the Fall of Saigon, Huong's parents were each chosen by their families to flee Vietnam on fishing boats.

Truong's parents arrived in Australia in 1983 at the Midway Migrant Hostel in Maribyrnong, Victoria, which turned into the Maribyrnong Immigration Detention Centre. She was born and raised in the western suburbs of Melbourne, with their two brothers and four sisters.

== Early life and education ==
=== Education ===
Truong graduated from the University of Melbourne with a Bachelor of Arts in 2005, and from RMIT with a Master of Social Science in Environment and Planning in 2009.

In 2017, Truong completed a Diploma in Leadership and Management with Victorian University Polytechnic.

=== Pre-parliamentary career ===
Truong's first job out of university was at Centrelink as a Bilingual Customer Service Adviser, during the Howard Government years. This first sparked their interest in politics, seeing the first-hand the effects on people of ‘mutual obligation’.

Truong worked as a Policy and Projects Officer with the Victorian Government Department of Infrastructure in 2007, and as Environmental Planner and Sustainability Coordinator at Brimbank City Council from 2008 to 2018.

== Politics ==
Truong was first a candidate for the Greens to contest the Federal Division of Gorton in 2007 at the age of 24. Truong had joined the Greens only a few months earlier after learning about climate change. The campaign resulted in Truong feeling burnt out, and quitting the Greens before rejoining as a member in 2010.

Truong also served as the Co-Convenor of the Australian Victorian Greens Multicultural Working Group in 2017.

=== Victorian Parliament Legislative Council Representative (2018) ===
In 2017, Huong was preselected to step into the Victorian Legislative Council to represent the Western Metropolitan Region for the Greens, as Colleen Hartland retired from the Victorian Parliament. Huong was the first Vietnamese-Australia woman to serve in any Australian Parliament.

Between 22 February 2018 - 19 December 2018, Huong was also the portfolio holder for Multiculturalism, Youth Affairs, Sustainable Cities, Urban Water, Waste, Environmentally Sustainable Design & Planning and the Prevention of Family Violence, and also served on the Victorian Parliamentary Environment and Planning Committee.

In the 2018 Victorian state election, Huong was not re-elected.

=== Post-parliamentary career ===
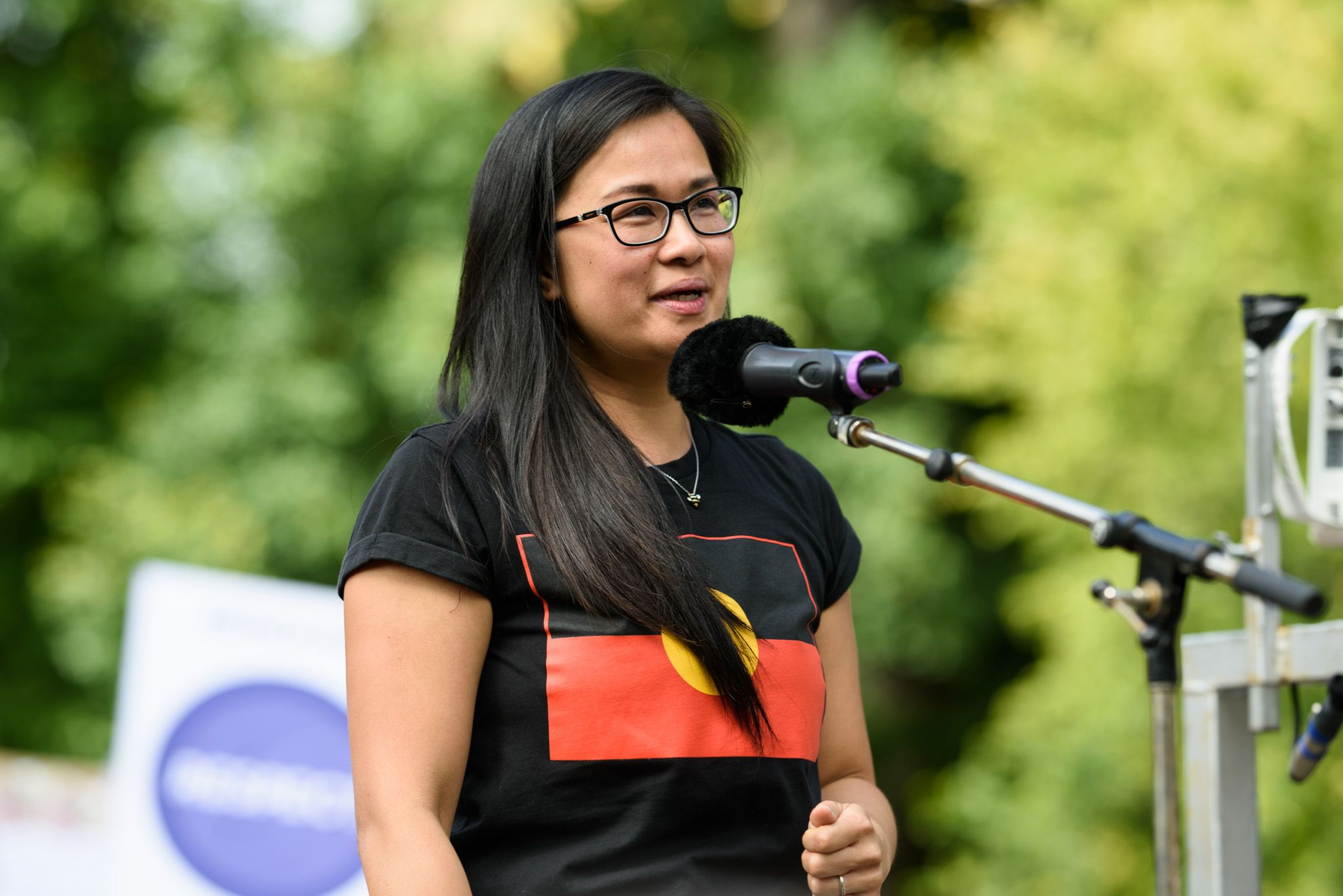
Truong in 2022

After serving in the Victorian Parliament, Truong worked as a organiser with the National Union of Workers to unionise individuals, predominately from the Vietnamese community, in the poultry industry. Truong is also a Founding Member and a contributor to the Vietnamese Australian Forum.

In August 2020, Truong announced she would run for council in the City of Brimbank, for the Harvester Ward, in the 2020 Victorian local elections.

In October 2023, Truong unsuccessfully ran for preselection to succeed retiring Victorian Greens Senator Janet Rice, on Rice’s retirement.

In July 2024, Truong was preselected by the Greens to contest the Labor-held Division of Fraser in Melbourne’s west.
