= Gabriel Rossi =

Australian comedian

Gabriel Rossi (born 3 February 1971 in Orbost, Victoria, Australia) is an Australian comedian.

His comedy focuses on stereotypes of ethnicities and various Melbourne suburbs. He often includes music in his stand-up comedy shows, playing acoustic guitar.

== Stand-up shows ==
Rossi made his debut appearance as a stand-up comic on the gruelling Melbourne pub circuit in 1996.

In 1998, Rossi was a Victorian finalist in the Triple J Raw Comedy stand-up competition.

Rossi first appeared in the Melbourne International Comedy Festival in 2000 in a show entitled "Melbourne: the Musical." He appeared again in "Reservoir Wogs" in 2004, receiving a 5-star review in the Herald Sun, and "Gift of the Gab" in 2006, lauded as "offering witty and candid perceptions of sexist and racist behaviour" and "refreshingly new" by The Age.

In 2000, following his Melbourne International Comedy Festival show, Rossi toured Perth, Adelaide, Sydney, Melbourne and country Victoria with fellow Italian Australian comedian Joe Avati.

In 2005, Rossi performed as part of the "Show Us Your Roots" tour, and was included in the DVD release of the show.

In addition to touring various clubs and hotels in suburban Melbourne, Rossi also performs for corporate functions.

== Media appearances ==
Since 1999, Rossi has made various appearances on radio and television.

In 1999, Rossi had a brief stint performing song parodies on breakfast radio on TTFM.

His television appearances included stand-up gigs broadcast on the Champagne Comedy and The Comic Box programs on Channel 31, both as a host and comedian.

He also hosted The Lygon Factor, a series on the Italian Australian community in Melbourne interjected with Rossi's own comedy, airing in 2006, again on Channel 31.

Rossi has released his own DVD, Reservoir Wogs: Live on Stage, based on his "Reservoir Wogs" comedy show and including excerpts from The Lygon Factor program.

== Political views ==
Rossi planned to stand as a candidate for the Victorians Party at the 2022 state election. The party dissolved before the election.

== Releases ==
=== CD releases ===
- "Mama's Boy" (2001)
- "Melbourne Suburbs Medley" (single) (2002)
- "Live @ The Comic's Lounge" (2003)
- "Aussie Tarantella Song" (2006)

=== DVD releases ===
- "Show Us Your Roots" (2005)
- "Reservoir Wogs: Live on Stage"
