= Khalil Eideh =

Australian politician

Member of the Victorian Legislative Council for Western Metropolitan Region
- In office 25 November 2006 – 24 November 2018

Personal details
- Born: 8 November 1954 (age 72) Tripoli, Lebanon
- Citizenship: Australia; Syria
- Party: Labor Party

Khalil Eideh (born 8 November 1954) is an Australian politician. He was an Australian Labor Party member of the Victorian Legislative Council from 2006 to 2018, representing the Western Metropolitan Region.

Born in Tripoli in Lebanon to Syrian parents, he migrated to Australia, where he became a mail officer with Australia Post (1975–79). From 1987 to 2006, he was the managing director of the Bluestar Logistics Freight company. In 2001, he received the Centenary Medal for services to the community and transport, the Award for Excellence in Multicultural Affairs in 2005, and was also appointed a Harmony Day Ambassador.

He is known to be a former member of the fascist Lebanese political party, the Syrian Social Nationalist Party, and is alleged to have informed on members of the expatriate Syrian Australian community to the Syrian government.

In 2006, he was elected to the Victorian Legislative Council as a member for the Western Metropolitan Region, representing the Labor Party. He served on a number of committees in the Parliament of Victoria and was acting president of the Legislative Council.

In late July 2017, he was denied entry to the U.S. after flying from Vancouver, Canada, to Denver, Colorado, despite possessing a visa. His visit was as part of a group of Victorian politicians examining the effectiveness of drug laws and regulations in Europe and North America.

He did not seek re-election at the 2018 Victorian election.

Eideh is a supporter of the Essendon Football Club and was a member of several parliamentary committees.
