= Electoral district of Tullamarine =

Former state electoral district of Victoria, Australia

Coordinates: 37°42′S 144°53′E

Tullamarine Victoria—Legislative Assembly
- State: Victoria
- Created: 1992
- Abolished: 2002
- Namesake: Suburb of Tullamarine
- Demographic: Outer metropolitan

Electoral district of Tullamarine was an electoral district of the Legislative Assembly in the Australian state of Victoria. The district centred on the suburb of Tullamarine, about 17 km north-west of Melbourne.

== Members for Tullamarine ==
Member	Party	Term
Bernie Finn	Liberal	1992–1999
Liz Beattie	Labor	1999–2002
