= Trung Luu =

Australian politician

Trung Luu MLC
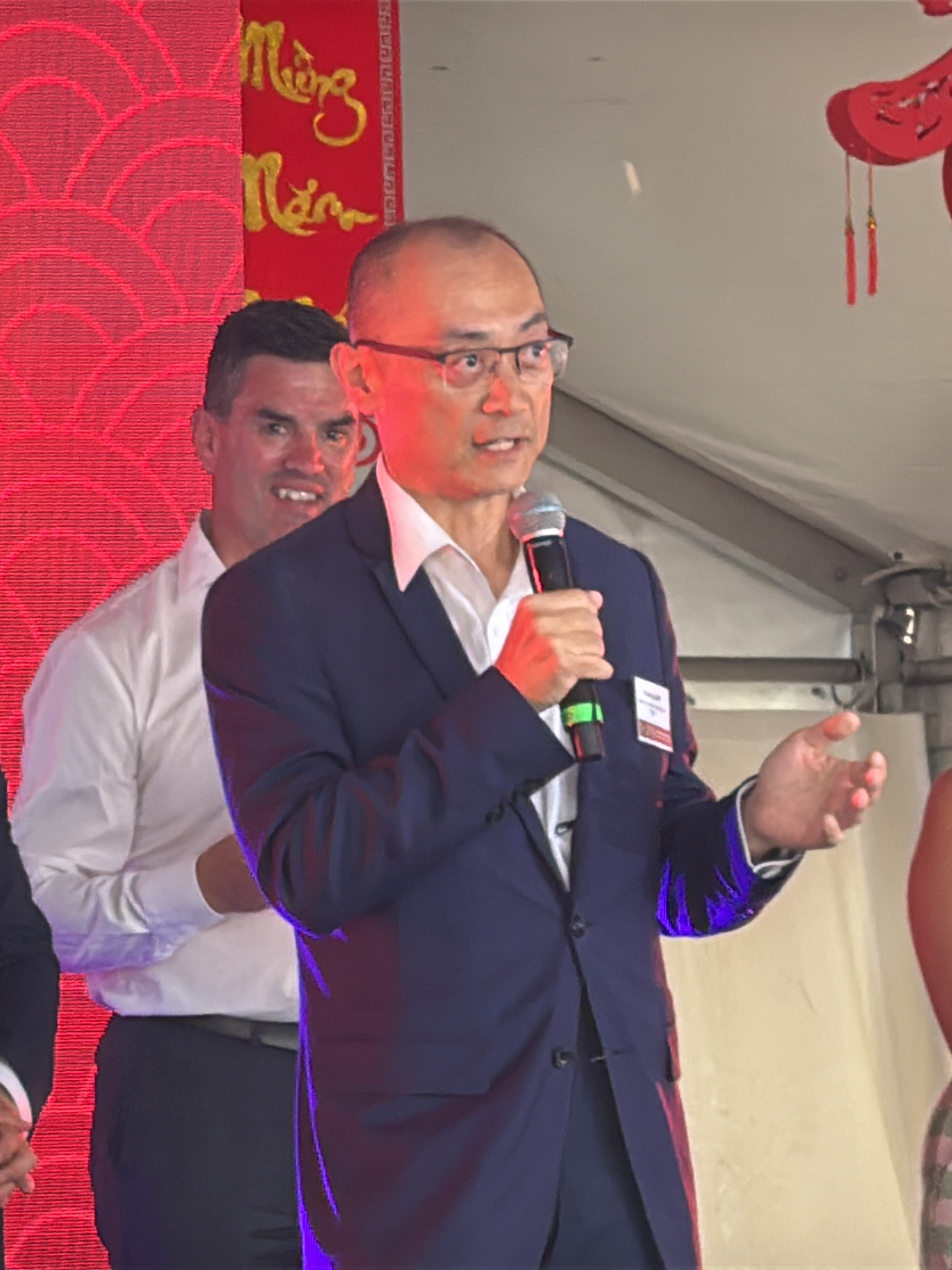
- Luu with then-party leader Brad Battin in February 2025

Member of the Victorian Legislative Council for Western Metropolitan Region
- Incumbent
- Assumed office 26 November 2022

Personal details
- Born: Vietnam
- Party: Liberal

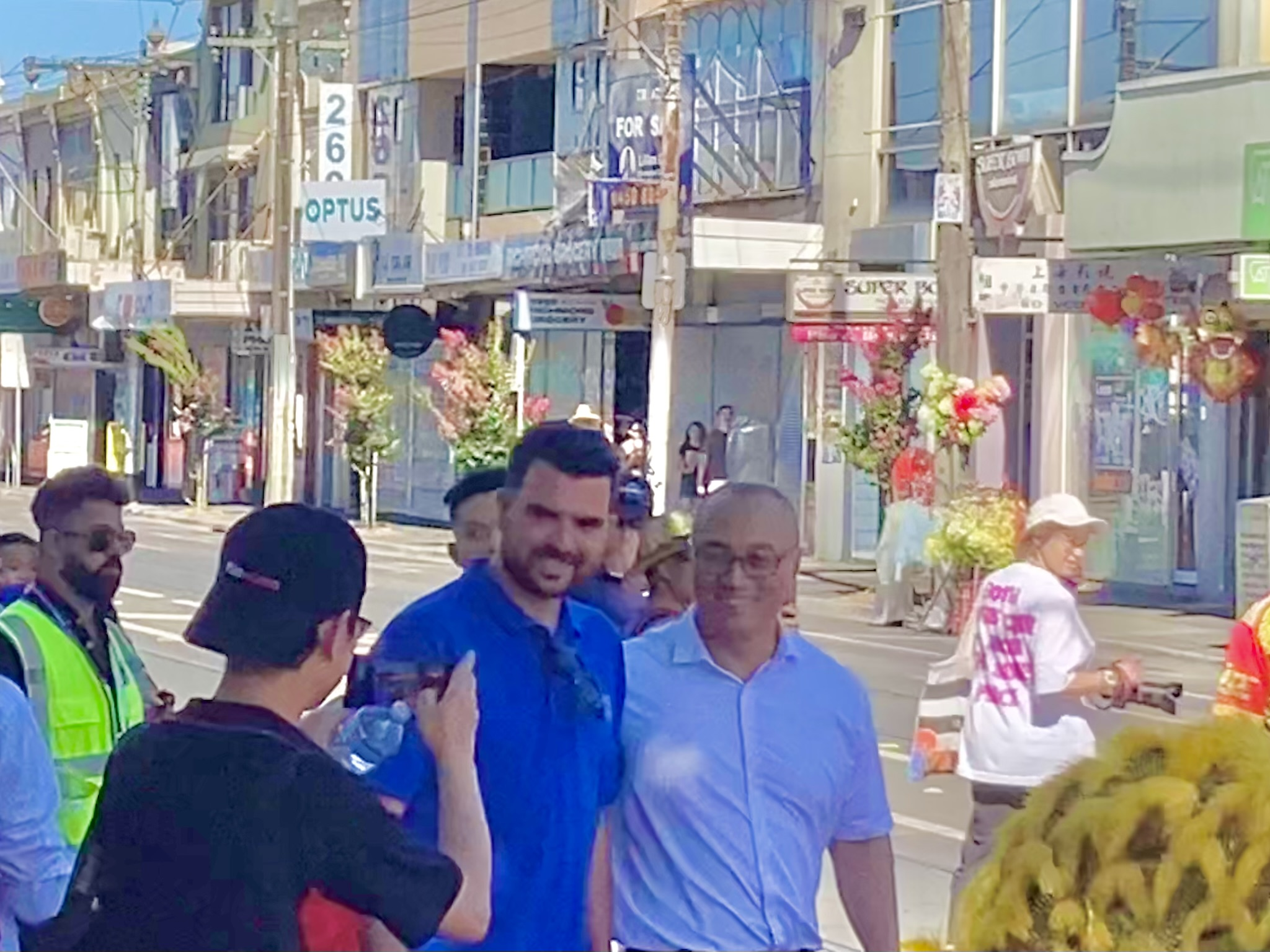
Luu with fellow Liberal Party upper house MP Evan Mulholland in February 2024

Trung Luu is an Australian politician. He is a member of the Victorian Liberal Party and is a member of the Victorian Legislative Council, representing the Western Metropolitan Region since November 2022. He was previously a councillor for the Brimbank City Council.

He is the first Vietnamese State Member of Parliament to represent the Liberal Party in the Legislative Council.

== Early life ==
Luu arrived in Australia as a refugee in the late 1970s from Vietnam after the fall of Saigon. He was educated at Blackburn High School and studied civil engineering at RMIT. As of 2023 Luu is married with five young children.

Luu served for 28 years with Victoria Police and championed bridging the gap between the Vietnamese Community and Victoria Police where he presented the Victoria Police Multicultural Media award in 2010. Trung has also completed a Graduate Diploma in Public Safety and Forensic Investigation.

Luu also served for 19 years with the Australian Army Reserve. In 2016 he presented with the Junior Non-Commissioner Reserve TASMAN Scheme award for leadership, dedication, and commitment, and the honour of representing ADF in a bilateral exchange program with NZDF.

In 2019 bushfire assists, Luu led a team of mobile units in the Alpine area, northwest of Victoria, assisting local authorities and evacuating residents from the fire fronts.

== Political life ==
Luu contested the seat of St Albans at the November 2018 state election where he was unsuccessful.

In October 2020, he contested the Harvester ward of the Brimbank City Council at the council election and was elected as a councillor in November.

Luu was preselected by the Liberal Party for the Western Metropolitan Region for the second spot on their electoral ticket for the 2022 state election. He was successfully elected to Parliament at the state election in November 2022.

Shortly after election, Luu was immediately elevated to shadow Parliamentary secretary for Multicultural Affairs in John Pesutto's shadow cabinet in December. He also resigned his position as councillor of Brimbank City Council.
