= Western Metropolitan Region =

Electoral region of the Victorian Legislative Council

Western Metropolitan Region Victoria—Legislative Council
- Interactive map of electoral region boundaries from the 2022 state election, along with its composition of electoral districts
- State: Victoria
- Created: 2006
- MP: Lizzie Blandthorn (Labor); Moira Deeming (Independent); David Ettershank (Legalise Cannabis); Trung Luu (Liberal); Ingrid Stitt (Labor)
- Party: Labor (2); Legalise Cannabis (1); Liberal (1); Independent (1)
- Electors: 538,136 (2022)
- Area: 1,299 km^{2} (501.5 sq mi)
- Demographic: Metropolitan
- Coordinates: 37°45′S 144°42′E

Western Metropolitan Region is one of the eight electoral regions of Victoria, Australia, which elects five members to the Victorian Legislative Council (also referred to as the upper house) by proportional representation. The region was created in 2006 following the 2005 reform of the Victorian Legislative Council.

The region comprises the Legislative Assembly districts of Footscray, Kororoit, Laverton, Niddrie, Point Cook, St Albans, Sunbury, Sydenham, Tarneit, Werribee and Williamstown.

== Members ==
Members for Western Metropolitan Region
Year	Member	Party	Member	Party	Member	Party	Member	Party	Member	Party
2006	Colleen Hartland	Greens	Khalil Eideh	Labor	Martin Pakula	Labor	Justin Madden	Labor	Bernie Finn	Liberal
2010	Colleen Hartland	Greens	Khalil Eideh	Labor	Martin Pakula	Labor	Andrew Elsbury	Liberal	Bernie Finn	Liberal
2013	Colleen Hartland	Greens	Khalil Eideh	Labor	Cesar Melhem	Labor	Andrew Elsbury	Liberal	Bernie Finn	Liberal
2014	Colleen Hartland	Greens	Khalil Eideh	Labor	Cesar Melhem	Labor	Rachel Carling-Jenkins	Democratic Labour	Bernie Finn	Liberal
2017	Colleen Hartland	Greens	Khalil Eideh	Labor	Cesar Melhem	Labor	Rachel Carling-Jenkins	Conservatives	Bernie Finn	Liberal
2018	Huong Truong	Greens	Khalil Eideh	Labor	Cesar Melhem	Labor	Rachel Carling-Jenkins	Independent	Bernie Finn	Liberal
2018	Ingrid Stitt	Labor	Kaushaliya Vaghela	Labor	Cesar Melhem	Labor	Catherine Cumming	Justice	Bernie Finn	Liberal
2018	Ingrid Stitt	Labor	Kaushaliya Vaghela	Labor	Cesar Melhem	Labor	Catherine Cumming	Independent	Bernie Finn	Liberal
2022	Ingrid Stitt	Labor	Kaushaliya Vaghela	Independent	Cesar Melhem	Labor	Catherine Cumming	Independence	Bernie Finn	Independent
2022	Ingrid Stitt	Labor	Kaushaliya Vaghela	New Democrats	Cesar Melhem	Labor	Catherine Cumming	Angry Victorians	Bernie Finn	Democratic Labour
2022	Ingrid Stitt	Labor	Lizzie Blandthorn	Labor	David Ettershank	Legalise Cannabis	Trung Luu	Liberal	Moira Deeming	Liberal
2023	Ingrid Stitt	Labor	Lizzie Blandthorn	Labor	David Ettershank	Legalise Cannabis	Trung Luu	Liberal	Moira Deeming	Independent Liberal
2024	Ingrid Stitt	Labor	Lizzie Blandthorn	Labor	David Ettershank	Legalise Cannabis	Trung Luu	Liberal	Moira Deeming	Liberal
2026	Ingrid Stitt	Labor	Lizzie Blandthorn	Labor	David Ettershank	Legalise Cannabis	Trung Luu	Liberal	Moira Deeming	Independent

== Returned MLCs by seat ==
Seats are allocated by single transferable vote using group voting tickets. Changes in party membership between elections have been omitted for simplicity.

Election	1st MLC	2nd MLC	3rd MLC	4th MLC	5th MLC
2006	Labor (Justin Madden)	Liberal (Bernie Finn)	Labor (Khalil Eideh)	Labor (Martin Pakula)	Greens (Colleen Hartland)
2010	Labor (Martin Pakula)	Liberal (Bernie Finn)	Labor (Khalil Eideh)	Liberal (Andrew Elsbury)	Greens (Colleen Hartland)
2014	Labor (Cesar Melhem)	Liberal (Bernie Finn)	Labor (Khalil Eideh)	Greens (Colleen Hartland)	Democratic Labour (Rachel Carling-Jenkins)
2018	Labor (Cesar Melhem)	Labor (Ingrid Stitt)	Liberal (Bernie Finn)	Labor (Kaushaliya Vaghela)	Justice (Catherine Cumming)
2022	Labor (Lizzie Blandthorn)	Liberal (Moira Deeming)	Labor (Ingrid Stitt)	Legalise Cannabis (David Ettershank)	Liberal (Trung Luu)

== Election results ==
Labor were defending three seats. The Liberal Party and Derryn Hinch's Justice Party were defending one seat each.

2022 Victorian state election: Western Metropolitan
Party	Candidate	Votes	%	±%
Quota		74,860		
Labor	1. Lizzie Blandthorn (elected 1); 2. Ingrid Stitt (elected 3); 3. Cesar Melhem; 4. Cuc Lum; 5. Nurul Khan	166,371	37.04	−9.81
Liberal	1. Moira Deeming (elected 2); 2. Trung Luu (elected 5); 3. Golam Haque; 4. Manish Patel; 5. Luan Walker	109,895	24.47	+3.65
Greens	1. Bernadette Thomas; 2. Sarah Bray; 3. Isabella McRae McLeod; 4. Lloyd Davies; 5. Pierre Vario	36,239	8.07	−0.04
Democratic Labour	1. Bernie Finn; 2. Thi Kiem-Lien Lee	23,422	5.21	+1.54
Legalise Cannabis	1. David Ettershank (elected 4); 2. Raffaela Menta	19,295	4.30	+4.30
Victorian Socialists	1. Liz Walsh; 2. Aran Mylvaganam	16,095	3.58	+3.02
Family First	1. Darren Buller; 2. Mary Filmer	14,261	3.18	+3.18
One Nation	1. Ursula Van Bree; 2. Frank Vrionis	7,691	1.71	+1.71
Liberal Democrats	1. Anthony Cursio; 2. Liam Roche	6,546	1.46	−0.26
Shooters, Fishers, Farmers	1. Ken Vickers; 2. Geoff Ashby	6,401	1.43	−0.59
Animal Justice	1. Meg Watkins; 2. Nat Kopas	6,209	1.38	−1.26
Justice	1. Peter Sullivan; 2. Jean-Marie D'Argent	5,371	1.20	−5.80
United Australia	1. Andrew Cuthbertson; 2. Deepak Bansal	4,747	1.06	+1.06
Sack Dan Andrews	1. Samson Palkuri; 2. Burkin Yalaz	3,653	0.81	+0.81
Reason	1. David Thirkettle-Watts; 2. Harry Millward	3,617	0.81	−0.24
Freedom	1. John McBride; 2. Dan McBride	3,513	0.78	+0.78
Angry Victorians	1. Catherine Cumming; 2. Adam Robinson; 3. Jennifer Zalme	2,569	0.57	+0.57
New Democrats	1. Kaushaliya Virjibhai Vaghela; 2. Mohammed Qasim Shaik; 3. Arix Maheshkumar Bishnoi; 4. Anitha Jyothi Palkuri; 5. Yogesh Kumar Malhotra	2,470	0.55	+0.55
Health Australia	1. Isaac Golden; 2. Leah Golden	2,122	0.47	−0.49
Sustainable Australia	1. Bert Jessup; 2. Dennis Bilic	2,046	0.46	−0.28
Independent Liberal	1. Fred Ackerman; 2. Mark Barro	1,845	0.41	+0.41
Companions and Pets	1. Craig Treherne; 2. Mary Britton	1,806	0.40	+0.40
Independent	1. Walter Villagonzalo; 2. Sam Alcordo	1,623	0.36	+0.36
Transport Matters	1. Daniel Lowinger; 2. Greg Collins	1,204	0.27	−0.41
Independent	Esther Demian	144	0.03	+0.03
Total formal votes		449,155	95.94	+0.79
Informal votes		19,025	4.06	−0.79
Turnout		468,180	87.00	−2.25
