= Liz Beattie =

Australian politician

Member of the Victorian Legislative Assembly for Tullamarine
- In office 18 September 1999 – 30 November 2002
- Preceded by: Bernie Finn
- Succeeded by: District abolished

Member of the Victorian Legislative Assembly for Yuroke
- In office 30 November 2002 – 29 November 2014
- Preceded by: District created
- Succeeded by: Ros Spence

Personal details
- Born: Richmond, Victoria, Australia
- Party: Labor Party
- Children: 1
- Occupation: Trade union official
- Website: lizbeattie.com.au

Elizabeth Jean Beattie is a former Australian politician. She was a Labor Party member of the Victorian Legislative Assembly from 1999 to 2014. She represented the electorate of Yuroke from 2002; she previously represented the abolished electorate of Tullamarine. She was the Parliamentary Secretary assisting the Premier on Multicultural Affairs and Veteran Affairs in the Brumby Labor Government.

Beattie was born in the Melbourne suburb of Richmond. Before entering politics, she worked as an office manager for the Australian Services Union from 1994 to 1996, and as a building manager at Melbourne Trades Hall from 1996 until her election to parliament in 1999. She was also involved in her party's local branches, serving as president of the Labor branch in Sunbury from 1993 to 1998.

Beattie was preselected as the Labor candidate for Tullamarine for the 1999 state election, opposing outspoken conservative Bernie Finn. Finn had won the seat, in a traditional Labor area, in the huge Labor defeat of 1992, and had been re-elected in 1996. She won the seat, and served for five terms before retiring from politics at the 2014 Victorian state election.

Victorian Legislative Assembly
Preceded by Bernie Finn	Member for Tullamarine; 1999–2002	District abolished
District created	Member for Yuroke; 2002–2014	Succeeded by Ros Spence
