= Rachel Carling-Jenkins =

Australian politician (born 1975)

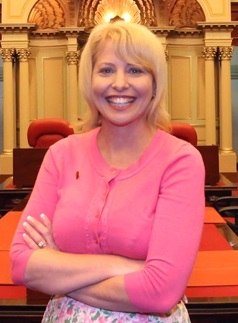

Leader of the Australian Conservatives Party in Victoria
- In office 26 June 2017 – 3 August 2018
- Leader: Cory Bernardi
- Preceded by: Office established

Leader of the Democratic Labour Party in Victoria
- In office 29 November 2014 – 26 June 2017
- Leader: Paul Funnell; Rosemary Lorrimar; Paul McCormack; Rosemary Lorrimar
- Preceded by: John Madigan
- Succeeded by: Office abolished

Member of the Victorian Legislative Council for Western Metropolitan Region
- In office 29 November 2014 – 24 November 2018

Personal details
- Born: Rachel Carling; 2 September 1975 (age 51) Rockhampton, Queensland, Australia
- Party: Independent (2018–)
- Other political affiliations: Conservatives (2017–2018); Democratic Labour (until 2017)
- Spouse(s): Gary Jenkins (m. 2005; div. 2016) Graham Watt (m. 2021)
- Children: 1
- Education: James Cook University
- Occupation: Research & Advocacy Manager (Aruma)
- Profession: former Politician

Rachel Carling-Jenkins (née Carling) (born 2 September 1975) is an Australian former politician. She was a member of the Victorian Legislative Council from 2014 to 2018, representing Western Metropolitan Region for the Democratic Labour Party (2014–2017), Australian Conservatives (2017–2018) and as an independent (2018). She did not recontest her Legislative Council seat at the 2018 election, instead unsuccessfully contesting the Legislative Assembly seat of Werribee.

== Career and education ==
Carling-Jenkins obtained a Ph.D. in Social Science from James Cook University in 2007. She has worked as an academic and social worker. Carling-Jenkins is the author of Disability and Social Movements, which was published in November 2014.

== Political career ==
She was elected as a Democratic Labour Party (DLP) member in the Western Metropolitan Region of the Victorian Legislative Council at the 2014 state election. On 26 June 2017, Carling-Jenkins resigned from the DLP to join Cory Bernardi's Australian Conservatives. Carling-Jenkins said of the move, “I think it’s time for minor parties, like-minded parties, to unite because the conservative vote has been fractured." On 3 August 2018 Carling-Jenkins quit the Australian Conservatives after the party announced it would not contest the Victorian election in 2018.

== Policy positions ==
In Carling-Jenkins' inaugural parliamentary speech, she described herself as a social justice campaigner, committed to raising awareness about gender selection abortions, cracking down on the sex industry, and rights for people with a disability and the elderly.

Carling-Jenkins was a leading anti-abortion activist in parliament, speaking often about her hopes to roll back Victoria’s abortion laws.

In a speech to the Victorian Legislative Council in September 2017, Carling-Jenkins disclosed that her former husband had been convicted and imprisoned for possession of child pornography, describing her shock at discovering the material on his computer and how she had reported him to the police. Carling-Jenkins has campaigned widely against child exploitation.

Carling-Jenkins was a force behind the introduction of Jalal's Law, which provides that any unlicensed driver involved in a crash where someone is killed or injured will be presumed to have been driving dangerously. The change follows community lobbying over the death of 13-year-old boy Jalal Yassine-Naja, who was killed after being struck by a four-wheel-drive with an unlicensed driver behind the wheel in March 2017.

== Personal life ==
On 22 October 2021, Carling married former Liberal MP Graham Watt.
