= Colleen Hartland =

Australian politician (born 1959)

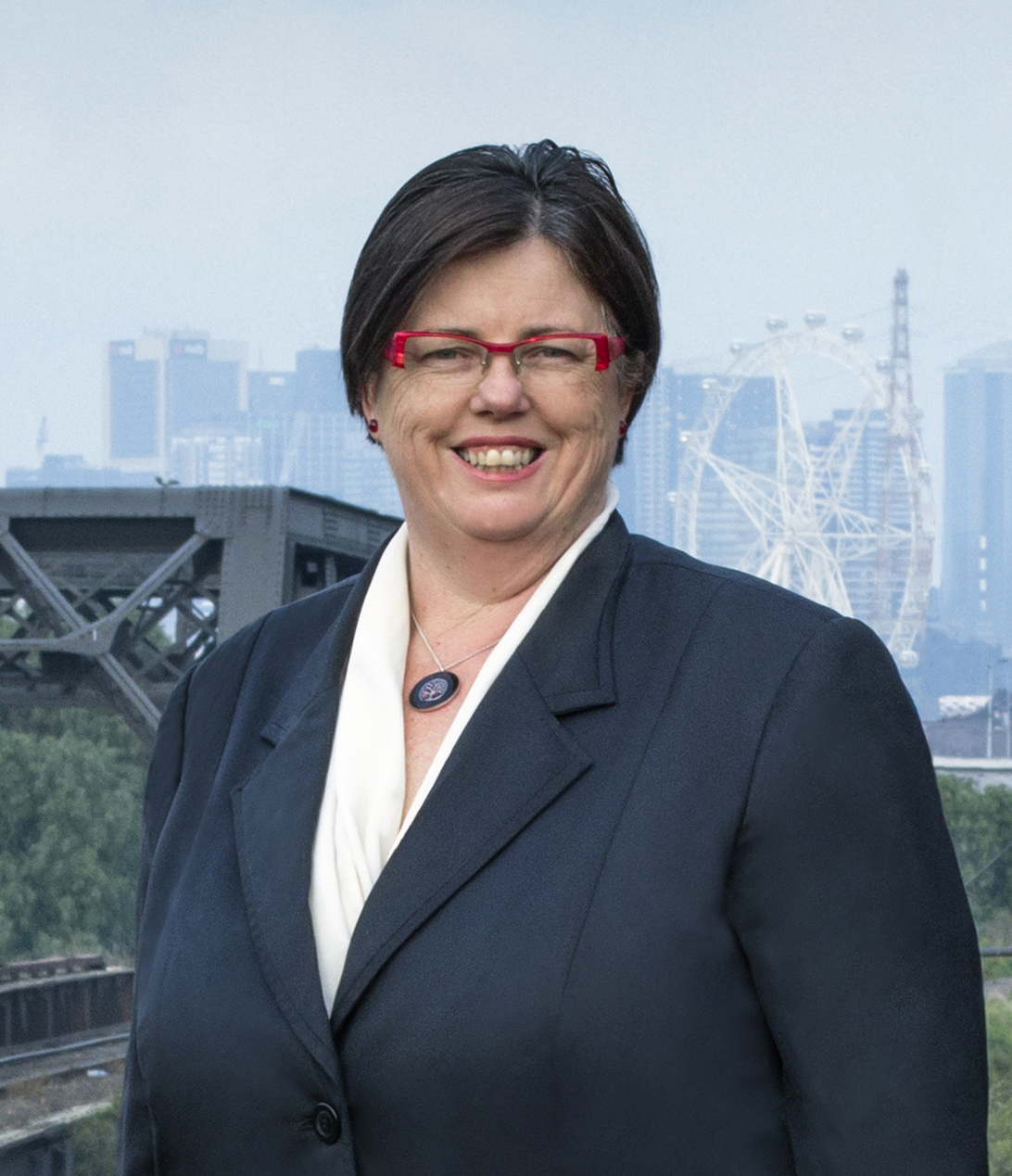

Member of the Victorian Legislative Council for Western Metropolitan Region
- In office 25 November 2006 – 8 February 2018
- Succeeded by: Huong Truong

Personal details
- Born: 1 February 1959 (age 67) Morwell, Victoria, Australia
- Party: Greens

Colleen Mildred Hartland (born 1 February 1959) is a former Australian politician, and a Greens member of the Victorian Legislative Council from 2006 to 2018.

== Early career ==
Hartland is a Western Suburbs resident and activist who rose to prominence as a leader of the community campaign against the storage of toxic chemicals at Coode Island during the 1990s. She was a foundation member of the Hazardous Materials Action group (HAZMAG) and was a member of Environment Effects Committees on West Point Wilson, Point Lillias and the proposed toxic dump at Werribee. Hartland chaired the Maribyrnong Drug Strategy Committee for three years. She was also employed as a social worker by the Western Region Health Centre.

Hartland has previously worked as a cook in Parliament during the term of the Cain/Kirner Governments.

== Local politics ==
Hartland was elected as Councillor for Sheok Ward in the Maribyrnong City Council in 2003, and served on the council until 2005 as one of the first Victorian Greens elected into council.

== State politics ==
Hartland stood as an independent candidate affiliated with the then-unregistered Victorian Greens at the 1992 Victorian state election, standing in the district of Footscray.

Hartland won a seat for the Greens in the Western Metropolitan Region of the Victorian Legislative Council in the 2006 State election, elected to the final spot, narrowly beating the Labor candidate after a vote recount. She increased her vote from 8.93% in 2006 to 11.66% in the 2010 State Election to hold her seat for another term. In the 2014 Victorian State Election, Hartland was re-elected, this time to the fourth position in the Western Metropolitan Region with 9.89% of first preference votes. This was despite nearly twice as many candidates contesting the region and both the Labor Party and Liberal Party suffering larger swings against them.

On 13 June 2017, it was announced in an email to party members that Hartland, and state Greens leader Greg Barber, would not be contesting their Legislative Council seats at the 2018 Victorian state election. However, Barber resigned in September 2017, and Hartland resigned on 8 February 2018.
