= Australian Values Party =

Australian political party

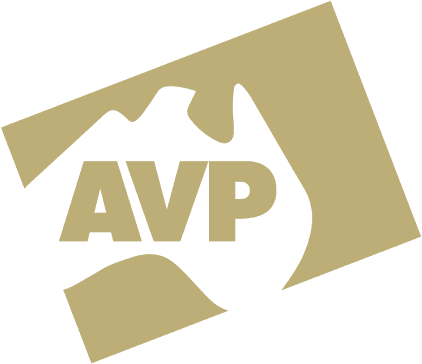
- Abbreviation: AVP
- Leader: Heston Russell
- Founded: 17 September 2021; 5 years ago
- Registered: 18 January 2022; 4 years ago
- Dissolved: 29 June 2023; 3 years ago
- Ideology: Veterans' rights Populism
- Colors: Green Gold
- Victorian Legislative Council: 1 / 42 (2022)
- Stonnington City Council: 1 / 9 (2023)

Website
- https://australianvalues.org.au/

The Australian Values Party (AVP) was an Australian political party founded in 2021 by ADF veteran Heston Russell. The party's main focus was veterans' rights, although it had policy positions on other subjects as well.

The party was disbanded in June 2023 and voluntarily deregistered the following month.

== History ==
The party was registered by the Australian Electoral Commission as a political party on 18 January 2022, after applying for registration on 17 September 2021. The Australian Values Party fielded candidates in the 2022 Australian federal election.

In August 2022, the AVP announced the Angry Victorians Party would contest the Victorian state election as a branch of the party. Independent member for the Western Metropolitan Region, Catherine Cumming, joined the party in November after having her application to register the Independence Party refused. On 16 November 2022, party leader Heston Russell leaked a video to the Herald Sun of him to talking to Glenn Druery about a potential preference deal, declaring that the AVP felt the co-ordination of the group voting ticket system used by Druery was immoral and needed to be exposed.

Heston donated $650,000 to the party in 2022–23, before winding it up in June 2023, and its ultimate deregistration as a party in August 2023.

== Policies ==
The party has been focused on policies supporting disaster relief, defence and veterans’ affairs, and a heavy health & mental health focus. Party leader Heston Russell has been at the forefront of campaigning on Veterans’ Affairs policy since 2020.

== Political representatives ==
=== Victorian Legislative Council ===
- Catherine Cumming (2022)

=== Stonnington City Council ===
- Joe Gianfriddo (2023)

== See also ==
- List of political parties in Australia
