= Cesar Melhem =

Australian politician

Cesar Melhem MLC

Member of the Victorian Legislative Council for Western Metropolitan Region
- In office 9 May 2013 – 26 November 2022
- Preceded by: Martin Pakula

Personal details
- Born: 4 January 1965 (age 61) Lebanon
- Party: Labor Party
- Website: www.cesarmelhem.com.au

Cesar Melhem (Arabic: سيزار ملحم; born 4 January 1965) is a former State Secretary of the Victorian Branch of the Australian Workers' Union (AWU), and a former Member for Western Metropolitan Region in the Legislative Council, Parliament of Victoria, between 2013 and 2022.

== Background ==
Born in Lebanon, Melhem migrated to Australia at the age of 23. Completing a Diploma of Electronics in 1986, he worked as a process operator before being elected as a union organiser for the Federated Ironworkers Association of Australia (FIA). In 1990 he stood for and was subsequently elected as a full-time union organiser. He remained in this role until the FIA amalgamated with the AWU in the 1990s.

He was elected to the role of Assistant Secretary of the AWU in 2001 after its amalgamation with the FIA. Melhem went on to be elected State Secretary in 2006 following Bill Shorten's resignation.

During his time as State Secretary, Cesar led a campaign to secure the entitlements of AJAX members when the car component company was placed in the hands of administrators. More than $8 million worth of entitlements was secured for the workers. Cesar further fronted negotiations with Alcoa executives in Pittsburgh USA, successfully making the case for the Point Henry Smelter to stay open, to re-organise and provide an ongoing source of employment for the Geelong region in the face of an international review by the company that threatened to close it down.

Melhem was also director of superannuation provider to building and construction workers CBUS from 2007 to 2013, and of Chifley Financial Services from 2012 to 2013, an organisation that provides advice, investments, superannuation, insurance and mortgage lending services.

On 6 May 2013 Melhem announced he was resigning as AWU state secretary after 7 years, to enter the Victorian Legislative Council as the member for Western Metropolitan Region, succeeding Shadow Attorney General Martin Pakula, who resigned to contest the Legislative Assembly seat of Lyndhurst. Melhem was appointed to the vacancy on 9 May 2013. He was elected as a member in November 2014.

Melhem served as Government Whip of the Victorian Legislative Council in 2014–2015. He has served on the Economy and Infrastructure Legislation Committee and Economy and Infrastructure References Committee May 2013-November 2014, the Legal and Social Issues Legislation Committee and Legal and Social Issues References Committee April–May 2015, the Economic, Education, Jobs and Skills Committee since April 2015, the Legal and Social Issues Committee May 2015-August 2016, the Environment and Planning Committee since August 2016, the Fire Services Bill Select Committee June–July 2017 and the Electoral Matters Committee appointed in April 2019.

Melhem is the former chair of the Victorian Government's Western Melbourne Local Automotive Transition Taskforce. He now currently Chairs the Legislative Council Environment and Planning Committee.

On 1 June 2015 Melhem was accused of negotiating an addition to an enterprise bargaining agreement that would increase the unions ability to further the unions ability to negotiate better agreements in the future. In December 2015, Melhem was one of over 40 current and former trade union officials referred by the Royal Commission into trade union governance and corruption for possible prosecution. No charges were made and Melhem was found of committing no wrongdoing.

Melham was not successful in his re-election to the Legislative Council at the 2022 state election.

== Personal life ==
Melhem married his wife Jane in 1997, who together have two children. The family is settled in the western suburbs of Melbourne, where Melhem has lived since his arrival in Australia in 1988. He is a staunch supporter of the Western Bulldogs FC.
