= New Democrats (Victoria) =

Australian political party

- Abbreviation: ND; NDP
- Secretary: Kaushaliya Vaghela
- Founder: Kaushaliya Vaghela
- Founded: 11 August 2022; 4 years ago
- Registered: 6 October 2022; 4 years ago
- Split from: Victorian Labor Party
- Membership (2022): c. 2,000
- Ideology: Anti-corruption
- Legislative Assembly: 0 / 88
- Legislative Council: 0 / 40

Website
- Party website (archived)

The New Democrats (ND), also known as the New Democrats Party (NDP), is an Australian political party founded in 2022 by then-Victorian MLC Kaushaliya Vaghela. It changed its name to Put Australia First, Save the Environment in 2026.

== History ==
=== Background ===
On 9 February 2022, Vaghela (then a member of the Labor Party) crossed the floor in support of Adem Somyurek's motion to refer the Andrews government to the Victorian Ombudsman in relation to the alleged misuse of taxpayer funds, involving the diversion of parliamentary staffing resources to political campaigning and party factional activities prior to the 2014 Victorian state election.

In March 2022, Vaghela resigned from Labor to sit as an independent, making serious allegations of bullying against the party. Her criticisms were aired after she had been left off the Labor ticket for the 2022 state election, following an investigation by the Independent Broad-based Anti-corruption Commission (IBAC) into the conduct of her husband, Dinesh Chauhan, and staff members.

=== Formation and 2022 election ===
On 11 August 2022, Vaghela formed the New Democrats and applied for registration with the Victorian Electoral Commission (VEC). The party was registered on 6 October 2022, 51 days before the state election.

At the election, Vaghela was unsuccessful in her bid to be re-elected to the Western Metropolitan Region, receiving 0.55% of the vote. The party received a total statewide vote of 0.13% in the Legislative Assembly and 0.21% in the Legislative Council (the lowest statewide total for any registered party in the Legislative Council).

=== 2026 election ===
The party applied to change its name to Put Australia First, Save the Environment in July 2026. The VEC approved the name change the following month.
