= Catherine Cumming =

Australian politician

Catherine Cumming MLC
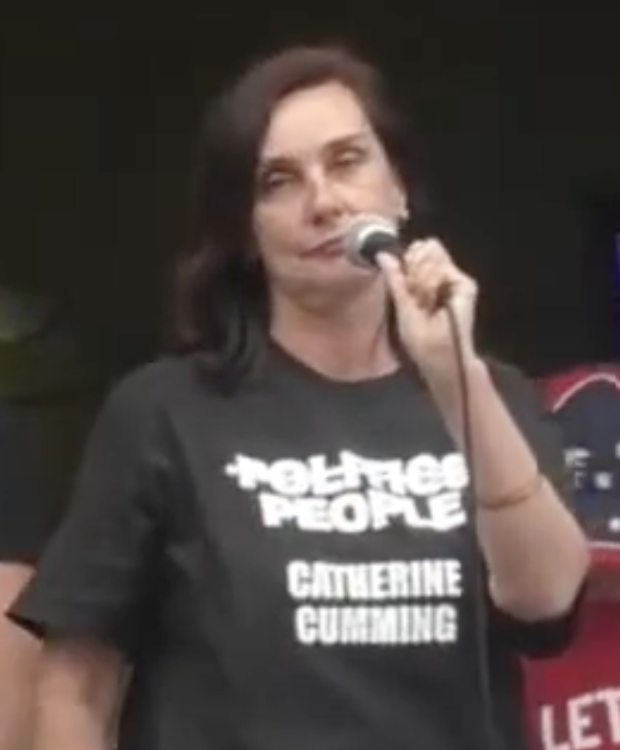

Member of the Victorian Legislative Council for Western Metropolitan Region
- In office 24 November 2018 – 26 November 2022

Councillor for the City of Maribyrnong
- In office November 1998 – November 2018

Personal details
- Party: Angry Victorians (2022–2023)
- Other political affiliations: Independence Party (2022); Independent (before 2018, 2018–2022); Justice (2018)
- Education: Victoria University, Doctor of Chinese Medicine.

Catherine Rebecca Cumming is an Australian former politician. She was a member of the Victorian Legislative Council from November 2018 to November 2022, representing the Western Metropolitan Region. She stood at the 2018 Victorian state election as a candidate for Derryn Hinch's Justice Party, but broke with the party just weeks after being elected, and was sworn in as an independent. A frequent speaker at anti-COVID vaccine rallies, Cumming joined the Angry Victorians Party in 2022 but was unsuccessful in her re-election attempt, gaining just 0.57% of the vote.

Before entering the Victorian Parliament, Cumming was a local councillor on Maribyrnong City Council, which included two terms as mayor.

According to The Age, between November 2018 and November 2021, Cumming voted with the Andrews Government's position 38% of the time, one of the least of any Legislative Council crossbencher.

== Career ==
In July 2019, it was reported that Cumming had hired her children, other relatives, and a friend to work as her electorate office staff. Despite doing this, she stated that the practice of hiring close associates as staff should be disallowed.

In 2021, Cumming was a frequent attendee at Victorian anti-vaccination rallies.

On 19 November 2022, Cumming declared at an anti-lockdown rally that she wished for Premier of Victoria Daniel Andrews to be turned into a "red mist". These comments were denounced by both Andrews and leader of the Victorian opposition Matthew Guy, and led to the Victoria Police opening an investigation into Cumming for alleged promotion of violence.

Ahead of the 2022 Victorian state election, Cumming set up the Independence Party. The party was not successful in getting registered, and in November she joined the Angry Victorians Party. Cumming failed to be re-elected, getting 0.57% of the vote in her region.
