= David Ettershank =

Australian politician

David Ettershank MLC
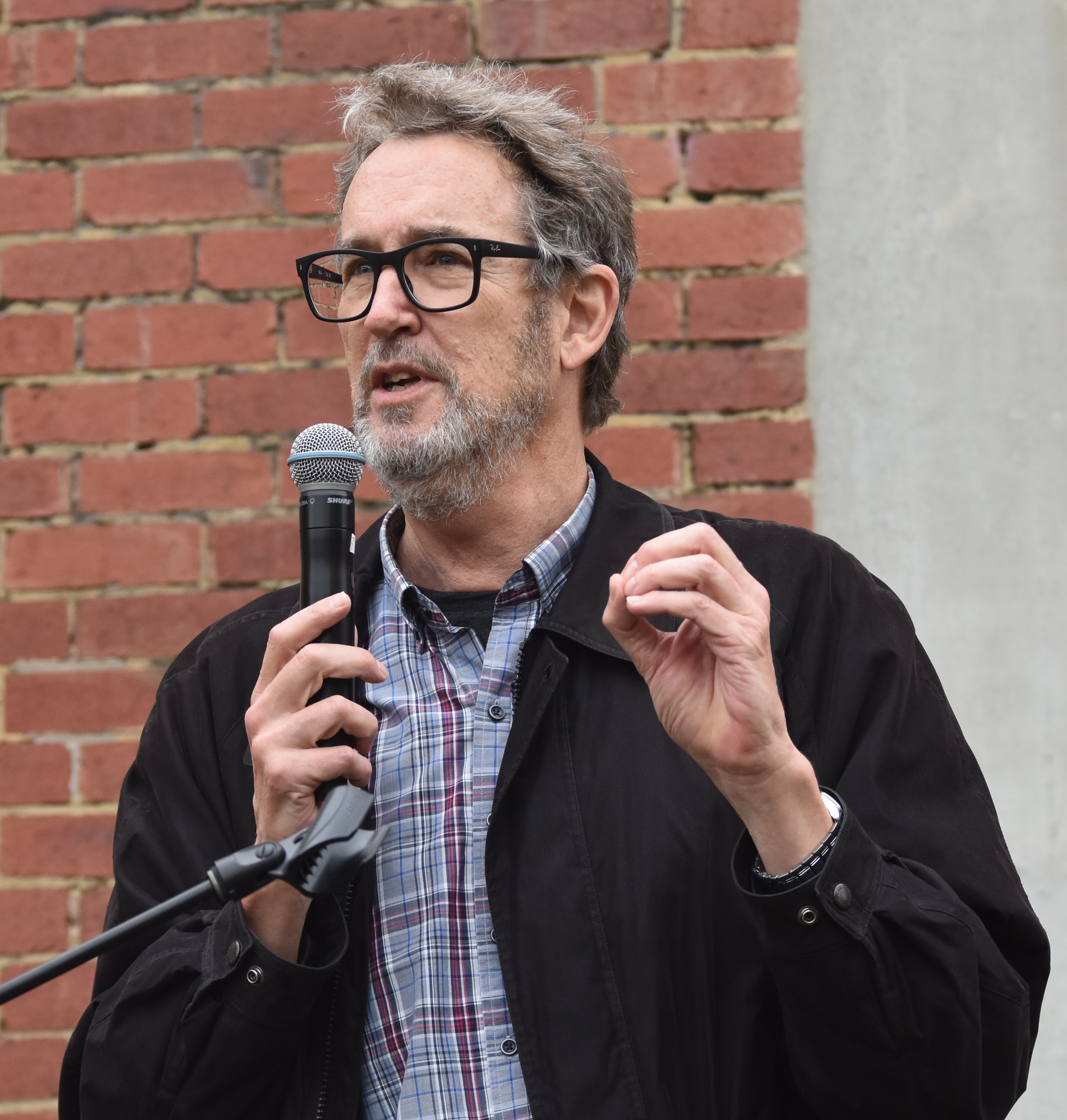
- Ettershank in 2026

Member of the Victorian Legislative Council for Western Metropolitan Region
- Incumbent
- Assumed office 26 November 2022

Personal details
- Party: Legalise Cannabis
- Other political affiliations: Communist Party of Australia
- Website: davidettershank.com.au

David Ettershank is an Australian politician. He is a member of the Victorian Legislative Council representing the Western Metropolitan Region since 26 November 2022. Ettershank is a member of Legalise Cannabis Victoria.

== Early life and career ==
Ettershank became politically active in Queensland during the late 1970s, participating in campaigns against uranium mining and for the right to march under the government of Joh Bjelke-Petersen. His early activism, influenced by the Vietnam War and anti-apartheid movements, which he claimed included multiple arrests.

Before entering politics, Ettershank had experience in the trade union movement and the not-for-profit sector. He spent a decade in the Communist Party of Australia and two decades working as an industrial and education officer in unions across Queensland, the Northern Territory, and Victoria. Ettershank has described this period as formative in shaping his understanding of social and economic justice, and of race, gender, and class issues.

After leaving the union movement, he became a partner in a small consulting firm providing services to not-for-profit aged care and community service organisations across Victoria and interstate, with a focus on governance, workforce and sector capacity issues.

== Political career ==
Ettershank was first elected to the Victorian Legislative Council for the Western Metropolitan Region at the 2022 Victorian state election. Legalise Cannabis won 4.30% of the vote in the region.

On 31 July 2024, Ettershank moved a motion in the Victorian Legislative Council calling on the government to establish a legal defence for medicinal cannabis prescription holders charged with the presence of THC while driving, provided they were not impaired and had taken the drug as prescribed. In support of the motion, he argued that roadside drug-testing in Victoria measures presence rather than impairment and disproportionately affects medicinal cannabis patients, citing government-funded research, driving trials, and comparable laws in Tasmania. The Labor government moved amendments to the motion that softened its language and replaced the call for an immediate legal defence with a requirement that the government consider a proposal and report back to the Legislative Council by October 2024.

== Political positions ==
=== Climate and environment ===
Ettershank has stated that one of his priorities as a Member of Parliament is action on climate change. Ettershank has called for the introduction of water conservation and sustainability standards for data centres.

Ettershank has opposed a proposed waste-to-energy incinerator at Sunbury citing community concerns about health impacts, air quality, traffic, and the proximity of the facility to homes, farms and waterways. Ettershank has criticised the state government’s licensing of the project, including the approval for the facility to process up to 750,000 tonnes of waste annually, and questioned why waste-to-energy facilities are being sited in metropolitan areas. In parliament, he raised concerns about HiQ, the waste management company behind the project, and its compliance history with the Environment Protection Authority and called on the government to ensure that any licensing decisions are not finalised before the completion of the parliamentary inquiry into waste-to-energy.

=== Cannabis legalisation ===
Ettershank, a long-term recreational and medicinal cannabis user, believes in the legalisation, de-stigmatisation, and regulation of cannabis. He, along with fellow Legalise Cannabis MLC Rachel Payne have pledged to smoke cannabis at Parliament House if cannabis is legalised. He has criticised the Victorian Labor government, stating that its opposition to the legalisation or decriminalisation of personal cannabis use is inconsistent with Australian Labor Party policy and recommendations from parliamentary inquiries. In 2025, Ettershank stated that he hoped the public appearance of American rapper Snoop Dogg in Melbourne could help normalise cannabis use and its legalisation in Australia.

=== Israel–Palestine conflict ===
Ettershank supports a peaceful resolution to the Israel-Palestine conflict, and condemned the Victorian government’s partnerships with Israeli defence company Elbit Systems due to its role in the occupation and violence against Palestinians, and called for transparency and accountability in government dealings with such arms manufacturers. He has called on the Victorian and Australian government to sanction Israel.

=== Australian republic ===
Ettershank is a republican, and supports replacing Australia's current constitutional monarchy. He has criticised the British monarchy as outdated and arguing that Australia’s head of state should not be a hereditary foreign monarch. On the topic of the King's Birthday public holiday, Ettershank stated "is there a sillier reason for a public holiday than to celebrate the non-birthday of the king of a foreign country?" Ettershank has also expressed that he hopes Charles III will be "the last King of Australia as it peacefully transitions to a republic."
