= Bernie Finn =

Australian politician (born 1961)

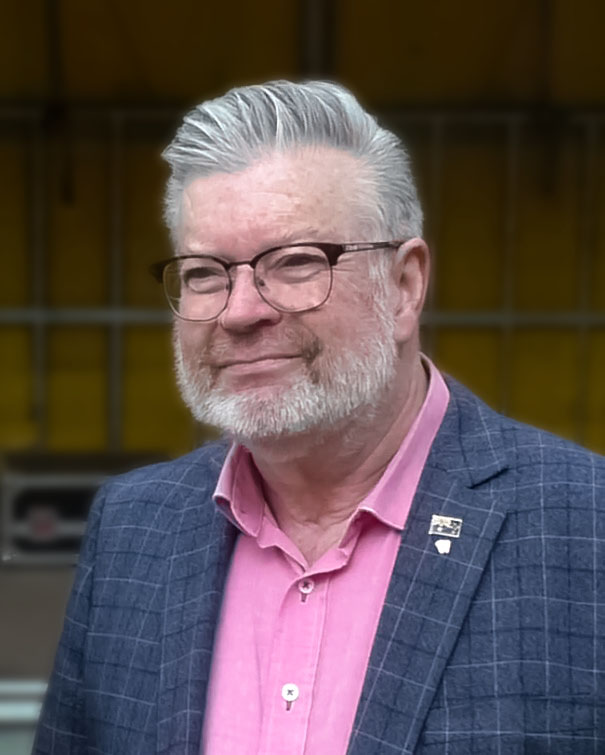
- Finn in October 2023

Member of the Victorian Legislative Council for Western Metropolitan Region
- In office 25 November 2006 – 26 November 2022

Member of the Victorian Legislative Assembly for Tullamarine
- In office 3 October 1992 – 18 September 1999
- Preceded by: District created
- Succeeded by: Liz Beattie

Leader of the Democratic Labour Party in Victoria
- In office 2 June 2022 – 6 August 2023

Personal details
- Born: Bernard Thomas Christopher Finn; 14 April 1961 (age 65) Colac, Victoria, Australia
- Party: One Nation (2026−present)
- Other political affiliations: Democratic Labour (1980, 2022−2023); Liberal (1981−2022); Family First (2023−2025)
- Occupation: Businessman; broadcaster; ministerial advisor
- Website: www.berniefinn.com

Bernard Thomas Christopher Finn (born 14 April 1961) is an Australian politician who was a member of the Victorian Legislative Council representing the Western Metropolitan Region from the election of November 2006 until he lost in the November 2022 election. He was previously the member for the electoral district of Tullamarine in the Victorian Legislative Assembly from October 1992 until September 1999.

== Political career ==
Finn was originally a member of the Democratic Labor Party (DLP). In 1980, aged 19, he was the DLP candidate for the federal seat of Corangamite. Soon after, he left the DLP and joined the Liberal Party. In 1983 he was the Liberal candidate for the federal seat of Burke.

=== Liberal (1980s–2022) ===
Finn was the Member for the District of Tullamarine from 1992 until 1999 when he lost his seat in the Steve Bracks led victory over the Kennett Liberal Government.

Finn was the number one candidate on the Liberal Party of Australia ticket in the Western Metropolitan Region from 2006 to 2018. He was first elected to the Legislative Council in 2006 and re-elected in 2010, 2014 and 2018.

During the period of the Baillieu and Napthine governments, Finn served as Chairman of the Victorian Parliament's Electoral Matters Committee.

Finn previously served on the Coalition frontbench as the Shadow Parliamentary Secretary for autism spectrum disorder, Shadow Parliamentary Secretary for Electoral Integrity and Shadow Parliamentary Secretary for Melbourne's West.

In 2018 Finn was involved in a controversy where he returned to vote on a bill despite having been granted a "pair" to be absent from voting due to religious observation.

In 2021, Finn was one of two Liberal MPs who voted against a ban on gay conversion therapy.

In May 2022, Finn was expelled from the Victorian Liberal Party for "a series of inflammatory social media posts", including calling for abortion to be made illegal in all circumstances, and comparing the Victorian Premier to Adolf Hitler.

=== Return to Democratic Labour (2022–2023) ===
On 2 June, Finn rejoined the Democratic Labour Party and announced he would recontest the 2022 Victorian state election as the leader of the party.

On 16 August 2022, Finn was one of three who voted against the Treaty Authority and Other Treaty Elements Bill 2022.

Finn was unsuccessful in his bid for re-election in 2022. Despite winning 5.16% of the vote, after preference distribution Finn narrowly missed out on re-election in the Western Metropolitan Region by only 210 votes, with Legalise Cannabis Party preferences instead electing a second Liberal candidate.

=== Family First (2023-2025) ===
On 6 August 2023, Finn left the Democratic Labour Party and joined Family First Party. He ran unsuccessfully as a Victorian senate candidate in the 2025 Australian federal election.

Finn was preselected by Family First to contest the 2026 Victorian state election in the Western Metropolitan Region, however he resigned from the party in November 2025 "in disgust" at the party's national executive.

=== One Nation (2026-present) ===
Finn joined One Nation in 2026.

== Political views ==
Finn has criticised abortion and been rebuked for his remarks that rape victims should not be allowed an abortion; former premier Denis Napthine, who like Finn voted against the 2008 abortion bill, called Finn's views "inappropriate". Finn is an opponent of same sex marriage, adoption, and IVF. Finn suggested during the 2012 Australian Open that some "gay activists" had "embarked on a program of rainbow fascism".

=== Climate change ===
Finn is a climate change denier and was a critic of the Gillard government's carbon pricing scheme, stating in the Victorian Parliament in 2013 that "there has been no global warming for 17 years". He has attacked the climate change documentary An Inconvenient Truth, as well as reports on the subject in the British newspaper The Guardian. He has claimed that global warming is an invention of the "international left", saying that "it raised a few dollars and promoted its own political interests. It came up with a thing called global warming", which he labelled "nonsense". He went on to say that "we have to come to a conclusion that climate change is not so much a scientific thing as it is a political thing". Finn also told Parliament that "This is a con; the whole thing is a con. Today we are in the Parliament of Victoria wasting our time on something that is largely an invention of the left".

=== Death penalty ===
Finn supports reintroducing capital punishment for serious offences, including serious drug trafficking.

=== US politics ===
Finn is a regular panellist on conservative television channel Sky News Australia and a frequent critic of the Black Lives Matter movement, climate science and members of what he views as ‘the left’, including American Democrats and the Australian Labor Party. Finn is a supporter of US President Donald Trump and a believer of the Big Lie conspiracy. In January 2021, Finn shared conspiracy theories to his private Facebook page, falsely claiming Donald Trump was being "improperly" removed from office. Finn also falsely suggested that antifa were behind the storming of the US Capitol and repeated unsubstantiated claims of election fraud about the 2020 presidential election.

=== Covid ===
In February 2021 Finn, addressing the Reignite Democracy Australia Facebook group, criticised the COVID-19 pandemic lockdown measures imposed by the Victorian government, saying that maybe they were about hardline socialists' dislike of small businesses.

=== Abortion ===
In May 2022, Finn expressed on Facebook that he is “praying” for abortion to be banned in Australia, following the release of the SCOTUS draft decision written by Justice Samuel Alito in Dobbs (19-1392).

== Personal life ==
Before entering Parliament, Finn was a small businessman, broadcaster and a media and ministerial adviser to Chris Pearce. He is married with six children.

Victorian Legislative Assembly
District created	Member for Tullamarine; 1992–1999	Succeeded by Liz Beattie
