= 2022 Victorian Liberal Party leadership election =

Leader selection contests within Victoria's opposition party

- Leadership election
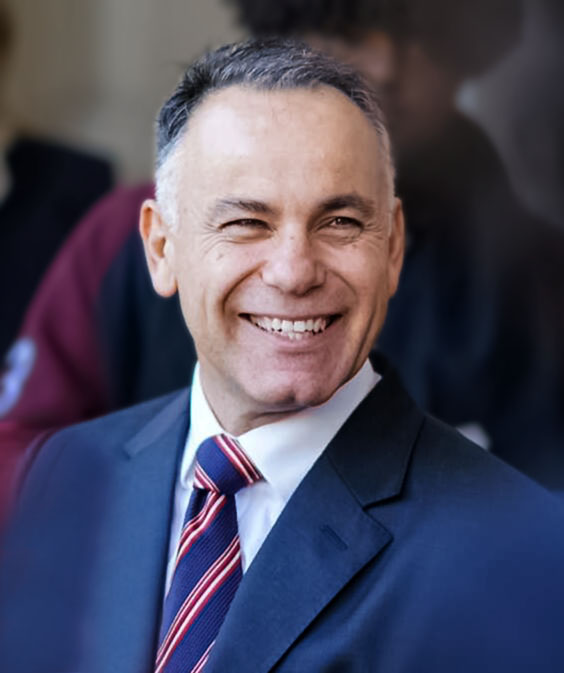

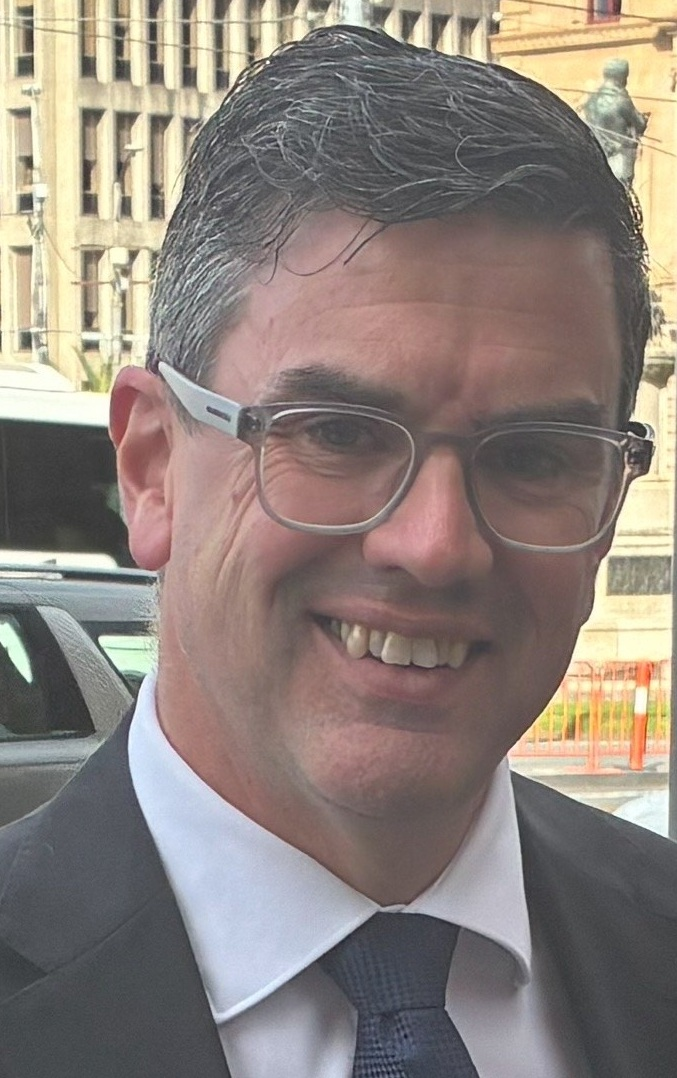
Candidate	John Pesutto	Brad Battin
Caucus vote	17	16
Seat	Hawthorn	Berwick
Faction	Moderate	Conservative
Leader before election
Matthew Guy
Elected Leader
John Pesutto
- Deputy leadership election
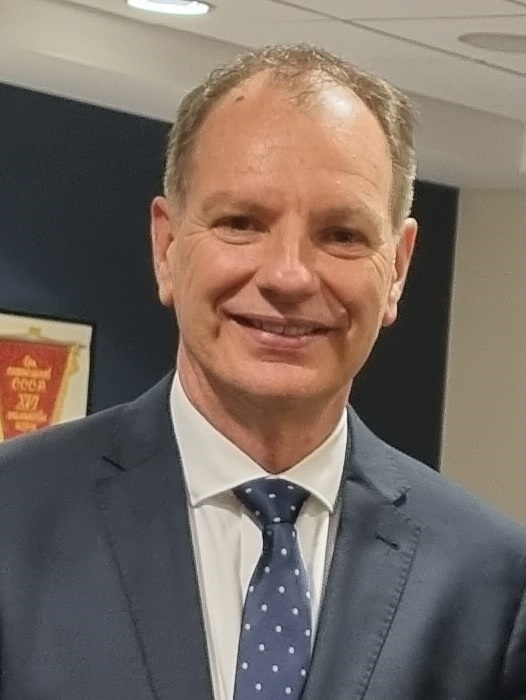

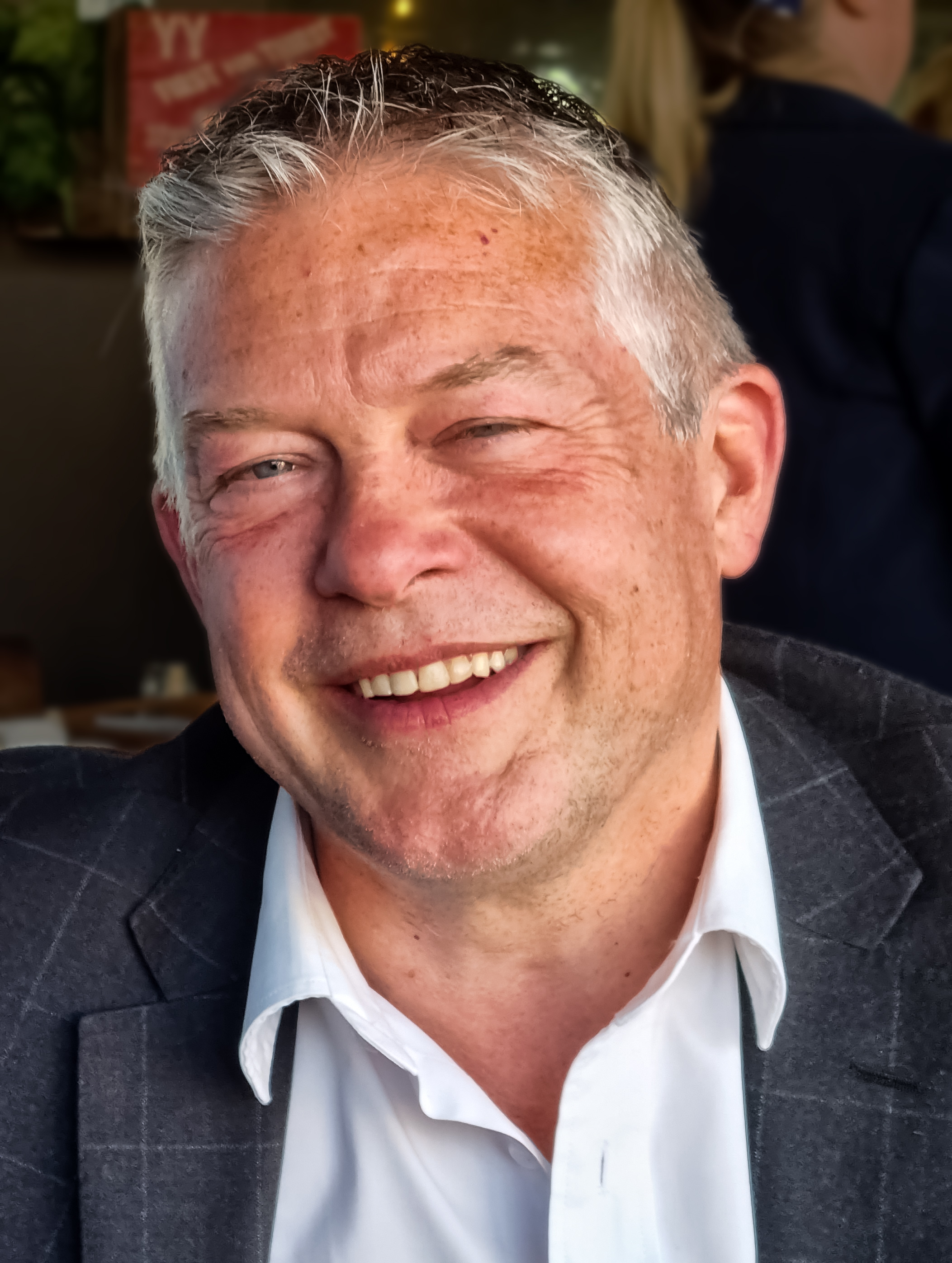

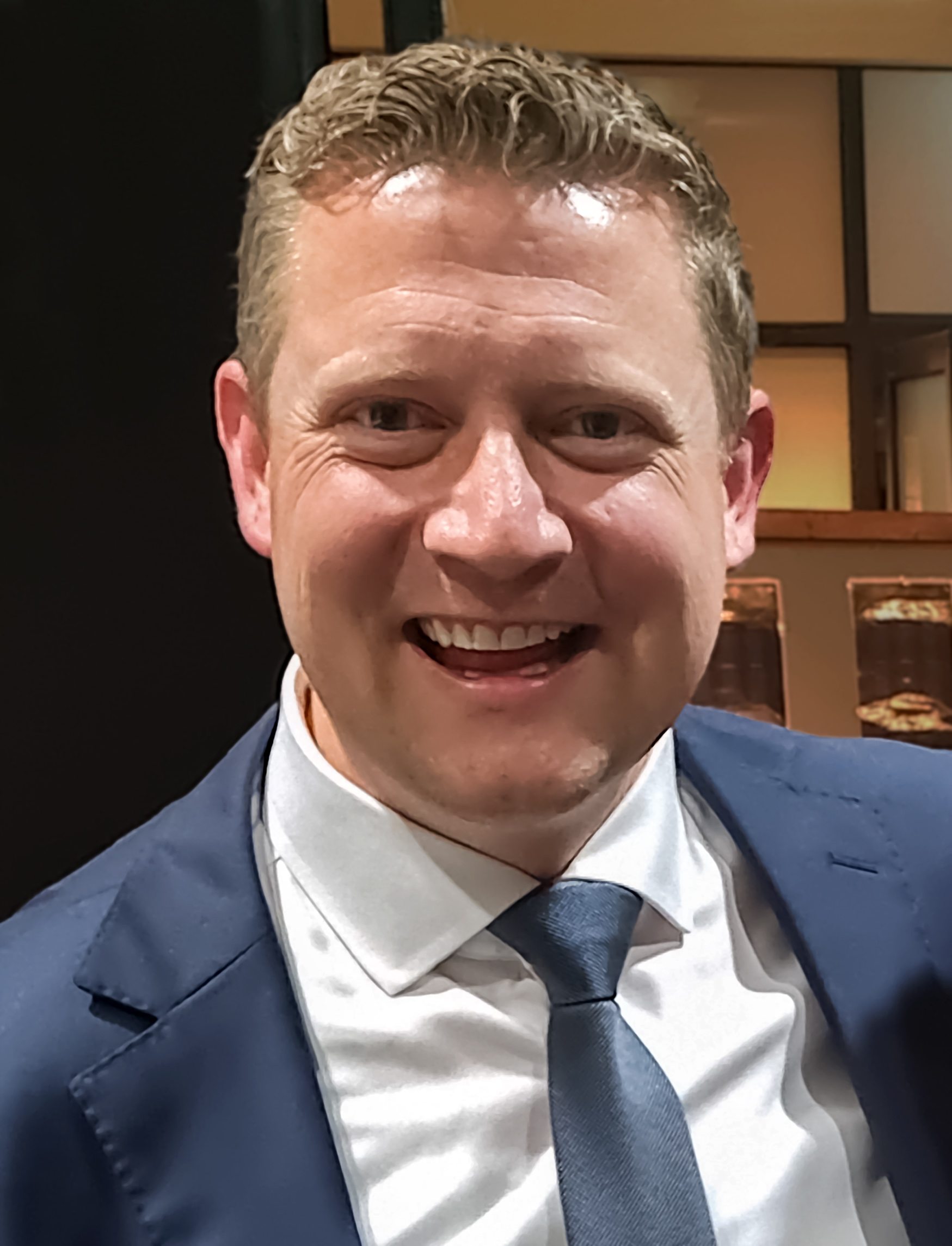
Candidate	David Southwick	Ryan Smith	Brad Rowswell
Caucus	#1	#2	#3
Seat	Caulfield	Warrandyte	Sandringham
Faction	Moderate	Conservative	Conservative
Deputy before election
David Southwick
Elected Deputy
David Southwick

The 2022 Victorian Liberal Party leadership election was held on 8 December 2022 to elect the leader of the Victorian Liberal Party and, ex officio, Leader of the Opposition, following the party's loss at the 2022 Victorian state election.

Matthew Guy, who had held these roles since September 2021 and previously in 2018 resigned after the Coalition's defeat to the Australian Labor Party at the November election.

Moderate John Pesutto defeated conservative Brad Battin 17 votes to 16, while David Southwick retained the position of Deputy Leader. In the Legislative Council, Georgie Crozier succeeded David Davis as leader, with Matthew Bach elected deputy leader unopposed.

== Background ==
Following the Coalition's defeat at the 2014 Victorian state election under then Premier Denis Napthine, Matthew Guy, who was minister for planning and minister for multicultural affairs and citizenship, was elected as the leader of the Liberal Party and subsequently opposition leader with Peter Walsh as his deputy from the National Party. Guy led the coalition to a landslide defeat at the 2018 Victorian state election and resigned as leader following the results. Former treasurer Michael O'Brien succeeded him as the leader.

By 2021, O'Brien's position was increasingly becoming the subject of speculation that the party was to replace him. On 16 March 2021, members of the shadow frontbench Ryan Smith, Brad Battin and Nick Wakeling resigned. Battin subsequently put forward a leadership spill motion on 17 March 2021, which saw O'Brien surviving the leadership challenge against him.

In September 2021, there was further speculation about O'Brien's leadership. On 6 September 2021, Guy and another frontbench member, Tim Smith resigned from O'Brien's shadow ministry. Later, another spill motion was called, which was successful with the Liberal caucus voting 20-11 for the motion and the leadership becoming vacated. The same day, Guy was elected leader for a second time unopposed.

Following the 2022 Victorian state election where the Coalition was again defeated, Guy announced his resignation as leader resulting in a leadership election for the next term.

== Candidates ==
=== Leadership ===
Following Guy's resignation as party leader, three candidates initially declared their intent to contest the election, all from the party's conservative faction—Brad Battin, who first challenged the party leadership in 2021; Ryan Smith; and Richard Riordan. Both Ryan and Battin had returned to the Shadow Ministry following Guy's return to the party leadership in 2021. On 30 November, Smith withdrew his candidacy, endorsing Battin; the following day, Riordan followed.

A fourth candidate, moderate John Pesutto, had publicly expressed his interest, although his candidacy was conditional on him regaining the seat of Hawthorn, which was lost to Labor's John Kennedy in 2018. On 30 November 2022, both Kennedy and teal independent challenger Melissa Lowe conceded defeat in the seat of Hawthorn; Pesutto officially announcing his candidacy on 1 December.

==== Nominated ====
Name	Positions	Faction	Declared
Brad Battin	Shadow Minister for Police (2021–present); Shadow Minister for Emergency Services (2021–present); Shadow Minister for Community Safety and Victim Support (2021–present); Shadow Minister for Corrections (2021–present); MP for Berwick (2022–present); MP for Gembrook (2010–2022)	Conservative	28 November 2022
John Pesutto	Shadow Attorney-General (2014–2018); MP for Hawthorn (2014–2018, 2022–present)	Moderate	1 December 2022

==== Withdrew ====
Name	Positions	Faction	Declared	Withdrew	Endorsed
Ryan Smith	Shadow Minister for Finance (2022–present); Shadow Minister for Planning and Heritage (2021–present); Shadow Minister for Suburban Recovery (2021–present); MP for Warrandyte (2006–present)	Conservative	28 November 2022	30 November 2022	Brad Battin
Richard Riordan	Shadow Minister for Local Government (2021–present); Shadow Minister for Housing (2022–present); Shadow Minister for Resources (2021–present); MP for Polwarth (2015–present)	Conservative	28 November 2022	1 December 2022	Brad Battin

==== Declined ====
- Michael O'Brien, former Opposition Leader (2018–2021) and MP for Malvern
- Georgie Crozier, Deputy Leader of the Liberal Party in the Legislative Council and MLC for Southern Metropolitan Region

=== Nominated ===
Name	Positions	Faction	Announced
Brad Rowswell	MP for Sandringham (2018–present)	Moderate	30 November 2022
Ryan Smith	Minister for Youth (2010–2014); Minister for Environment and Climate Change (2010–2014); MP for Warrandyte (2006–present)	Conservative	8 December 2022
David Southwick	Deputy Leader of the Liberal Party (2021–present); MP for Caulfield (2010–present)	Moderate	30 November 2022

== Leadership election in the Legislative Council ==
2022 Victorian Liberal Party Legislative Council leadership election
- 8 December 2022
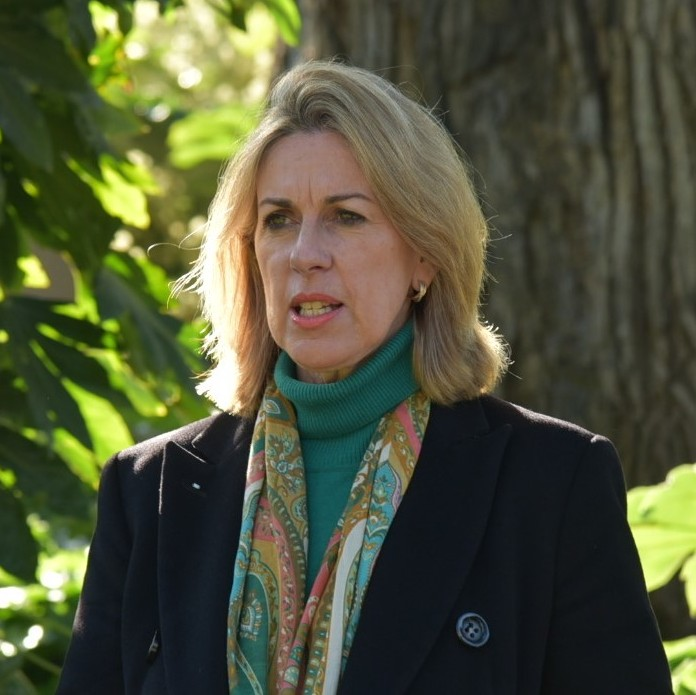

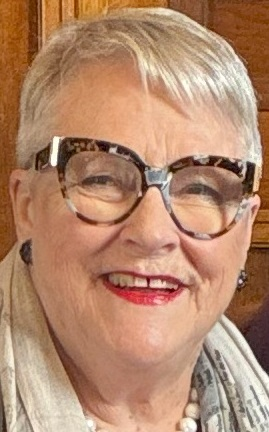
Candidate	Georgie Crozier	Bev McArthur
Caucus	21	13
Seat	Southern Metropolitan	Western Victoria
Faction	Moderate	Conservative
Leader in the Legislative Council before election
David Davis
Elected Leader in the Legislative Council
Georgie Crozier

2022 Victorian Liberal Party Legislative Council deputy leadership election
- 8 December 2022
Candidate	Matthew Bach
Caucus	Unopposed
Faction	Unaligned
Deputy Leader in the Legislative Council before election
Georgie Crozier
Elected Deputy Leader in the Legislative Council
Matthew Bach

There was speculation that the party's leadership in the Victorian Legislative Council may be contested. Prior to the election, David Davis was the leader in the council for the party. Some within the party advocated for others to challenge Davis. Some of the names that were listed included Bev McArthur, Matthew Bach and Georgie Crozier.

Crozier and McArthur ultimately stood for the leadership, with Crozier elected leader 21 votes to 12.
