= Victorian Liberal Party =

Victorian Liberal Party Liberal Party of Australia (Victorian Division)
- Abbreviation: LCP (1949–1965)
- Leader: Jess Wilson
- Deputy Leader: David Southwick
- President: Philip Davis
- Founded: 22 March 1949; 77 years ago (as the LCP)
- Preceded by: Liberal Party (original)
- Headquarters: 257 Collins Street, Melbourne, Victoria
- Student wing: Australian Liberal Students' Federation
- Youth wing: Young Liberals
- Women's wing: Liberal Women's Council
- LGBT wing: Liberal Pride
- Membership (2020): ▲12,000
- Ideology: Liberal conservatism; Liberalism (Australian); Conservatism (Australian); Factions: Christian right; Right-wing populism
- Political position: Centre-right to right-wing
- National affiliation: Federal Liberal
- Political alliance: Liberal–National Coalition
- Colours: Blue
- Legislative Assembly: 20 / 88
- Legislative Council: 10 / 40
- House of Representatives: 6 / 39 (Victorian seats)
- Senate: 3 / 12 (Victorian seats)
- Local government: 1 / 618

Website
- vic.liberal.org.au

Seats in local government
- Melbourne: 1 / 11

The Victorian Liberal Party, officially known as the Liberal Party of Australia (Victorian Division), and branded as Jess Wilson’s Liberal Victoria, is the state division of the Liberal Party of Australia in Victoria. It was formed in 1949 as the Liberal and Country Party (LCP) and simplified its name to the Liberal Party in 1965. The party sits on the centre-right to right-wing of the Australian political spectrum, and is currently led by Jess Wilson.

There was a previous Victorian division of the Liberal Party formed in March 1945, but it ceased to exist when the LCP was established four years later.

== History ==
=== Background ===
Robert Menzies, who was the Prime Minister of Australia between 1939 and 1941, founded the Liberal Party during a conference held in Canberra in October 1944, uniting many non-Labor political organisations, including the United Australia Party (UAP) and the Australian Women's National League (AWNL).

The UAP was a major conservative party in Australia and last governed Victoria between May 1932 and April 1935, under Stanley Argyle's leadership. Argyle lost the premiership when the UAP's coalition partner, the United Country Party, led by Albert Dunstan, ended the coalition and formed a minority government with the support of the Labor Party. After Argyle's death in late 1941, Thomas Hollway became the leader of the UAP in Victoria. During his time as UAP leader, he was the Deputy Premier in a Dunstan coalition government from September 1943.

The AWNL was a conservative women's organisation founded and originally based in Victoria, but had expanded across Australia since World War I. Its leaders included Dame Elizabeth Couchman and future senator Ivy Wedgwood, both of whom were from Victoria. During the October 1944 conference, the AWNL was recognised by Menzies as one of the long-standing non-Labor organisations in Victoria.

The Liberal Party in Victoria was established between December 1944 and January 1945, with the names of the provisional state executive revealed on 29 December 1944, and the first meeting held a week later, on 5 January 1945. The state executive included AWNL's leaders Couchman and Wedgwood. The AWNL joined the Liberal Party on 30 January 1945. The UAP and its parliamentary members (including Hollway) joined the Liberal Party on 5 March 1945, with the state parliamentary UAP becoming the state parliamentary Liberal Party. As a result, Hollway became the first parliamentary leader of the Victorian branch of the Liberal Party.

=== Old Liberal Party Victorian Division ===
On 2 October 1945, deputy Liberal leader Ian Macfarlan, was commissioned by the Governor, Sir Winston Dugan, to form a government, when it became clear that the Victorian Legislative Assembly would not grant supply to the Dunstan government. The Liberals were defeated by the Labor Party in the election a month later.

After the 1947 Victorian state election, the Liberals were again in coalition with the Country Party (renamed from United Country Party) and governed Victoria as majority government from 20 November 1947 to 3 December 1948, with Liberal leader Hollway as Premier and Country leader John McDonald as Deputy Premier until the collapse of the Coalition.

=== Liberal and Country Party ===
==== Formation ====
During a series of transport strikes in 1948, the moderate Hollway had dealt amicably with the transport unions and the Trades Hall Council, but McDonald heavily criticised his conciliatory approach to the conservative parties' traditional enemies. Hollway forced McDonald to resign as deputy, and Wilfrid Kent Hughes, deputy leader of the Liberal Party, was appointed Deputy Premier.

In February 1949, the Liberal Party planned to form a new Liberal and Country Party (LCP), with metropolitan and country interests proposed to be represented on a 50–50 basis. Hollway hoped this would unite the two "anti-socialist" parties of Liberal Party and Country Party together, an idea supported by Liberal Party and Country Party voters.

A merger of the Liberal and Country parties had already happened in South Australia in 1932, with the formation of the Liberal and Country League. The Liberal Party conference on 22 February 1949 endorsed the idea of a merger. However, the idea was rejected by the Country Party and argued it was a takeover attempt of the Country Party, and to eliminate the Country Party from Victorian politics entirely.

However, six Country Party MPs were willing to be part of the united party. On 22 March 1949, they joined the Liberals in forming the Liberal and Country Party (LCP). Hollway was chosen as leader of the new party and continued to be Premier. Hughes also continued as deputy leader of the new party and Deputy Premier. The six former Country MPs were eligible for Cabinet positions in the new LCP government, but turned them down since "the present cabinet had prepared legislation for the new parliamentary session" and "should carry on with it", so the incumbent cabinet composition was unchanged. The LCP succeeded the old Victorian Liberal Party as the Victorian Division of the Liberal Party of Australia, and federal members endorsed by the LCP sat with the Liberals in Canberra and belonged to the federal parliamentary Liberal Party.

Future Prime Minister, John Gorton, was one of those appointed to the state executive of the LCP. He had supported the Country Party since before the war, but became frustrated with the party's squabbles with the Liberal Party and its willingness to co-operate with the Labor Party. While being part of the LCP state executive, he had addressed Country Party gatherings in a few occasions, urging its members to join the new party and stressing that it would not neglect rural interests, as many feared. However, the Country Party was not convinced and never joined the new party.

The LCP, Country Party and Labor Party were the principal contestants at the 1949 Legislative Council election in June. John Lienhop, who was a member of the Bendigo Province and previously elected as a Country Party member, contested the election as an LCP member and managed to retain his seat.

Despite their differences, the LCP and Country Party agreed to endorse the same candidates for 10 seats in Victoria for the 1949 federal election in December, minimising three-cornered contests. The federal Liberal/Country coalition led by Robert Menzies won the election, securing 20 out of the 33 lower house seats in Victoria.

==== Loss of government ====
The LCP continued to govern Victoria independently as a minority government until 27 June 1950, when the Victorian Labor agreed to support a minority Country Party government led by McDonald.

In December 1951, Hollway and his deputy Trevor Oldham were replaced by Les Norman and Henry Bolte, as party leader and deputy leader respectively. In September 1952, Hollway and seven LCP members were expelled from the LCP after a dispute over electoral reform. In October, the Labor Party moved to defeat the McDonald government by working with two of Hollway's supporters in the Victorian Legislative Council to block supply. Hollway was commissioned by the governor, Sir Dallas Brooks, to form a minority government with the seven former LCP members, known as the Electoral Reform League, and the backing of the Labor Party on confidence and supply. However, 70 hours later, Brooks forced Hollway to resign and recommissioned McDonald as premier.

Two months later. at the state election in December 1952, Hollway contested Norman's seat of Glen Iris and won. Neither Country Party, the LCP, nor the Electoral Reform League won enough seats to form government. With Norman losing his seat, Oldham was elected as leader, with Bolte remaining as deputy leader. Oldham and his wife died in a plane crash in India on 2 May 1953, on their way to England to attend the coronation of Queen Elizabeth II, and Bolte succeeded him as LCP leader.

In 1954, Hollway and his supporters formed the Victorian Liberal Party, replacing the Electoral Reform League. Despite the name, it was a separate party to the LCP and the federal Liberal Party.

Following the Australian Labor Party split of 1955 that led to the weakening of the governing Victorian Labor, the LCP, led by Bolte, won the 1955 Victorian state election and formed government for the next 27 years, without a coalition with the Country Party. All members of Hollway's Victorian Liberal Party, including Hollway, lost their seats in the election, and the party ceased to exist.

=== Liberal Party ===
==== Change of name to Liberal Party ====
As one of the conditions of the Country Party supporting the government's supply bill in the Legislative Council on 27 October 1964, the 'and Country' was to be dropped from the name of the Liberal and Country Party. During the party's State Council in March 1965, the party debated for more than an hour on its party name. It was revealed through a letter from Menzies that he did not like the "Liberal and Country Party" name because "liberalism catered for people in the city and in the country". With the letter, Bolte managed to persuade the party to support the motion of change of name back to the original name of Liberal Party.

Malcolm Fraser, the Prime Minister between 1975 and 1983, is to date the last Liberal Prime Minister from Victoria. His immediate successor Andrew Peacock, who served from 1983 to 1985, and again from 1989 to 1990, is the most recent Victorian federal Liberal leader.

The Liberal Party continued to hold government in the Victorian state parliament until 1982 under the leaderships of Bolte, Dick Hamer and Lindsay Thompson.

==== Opposition (1982–1992) ====
The Liberal Party was defeated in the 1982 Victorian state election after governing Victoria for 27 years. Following the Liberals' defeat, Jeff Kennett became the leader of the party. He was deposed as leader following the 1988 Victorian state election, and was replaced by Alan Brown. During Brown's leadership, the Liberals reached a new Coalition agreement with the Victorian Nationals, led by Pat McNamara since 1988.

Kennett became party leader again in 1991 and led the Coalition to victory in the 1992 Victorian state election. The Liberals actually gained a majority of seats in their own right and although Kennett had no need for the support of the Nationals, he retained the Coalition with McNamara as his Deputy Premier.

==== Kennett government ====
The Liberal and National Coalition held government from 1992 to 1999 under Kennett's leadership. The Kennett government privatised many government services, including closing down over three hundred schools. The Liberals and Nationals fought as a Coalition in the 1996, after which the Liberals won majority in its own right again, and again 1999, after which the Coalition was defeated.

==== Opposition (1999–2010) ====
McNamara's successor as Nationals leader, Peter Ryan, ended the Coalition agreement. Since then, Liberals and Nationals had a strained relationship. Ryan uttered several sharp criticisms of the Liberals' most prominent figures, particularly their no-tolls policy on the Melbourne Eastlink freeway and on former leader Robert Doyle's remarks that the Liberals were twenty seats from government, a statement that assumed that the Nationals would support a Liberal government. Relations soured further at the beginning of 2006 when Victorian Senator Julian McGauran defected from the Nationals to the Liberals.

The Liberal Party was the sole opposition party in Victoria until 2008, when Liberals under Ted Baillieu formed a new Coalition agreement with the Nationals.

==== Baillieu & Napthine governments ====
After the 2010 Victorian state election, the Liberal and National Coalition held government under Baillieu's leadership. On 7 March 2013, Baillieu resigned from his position of Premier of Victoria; he was replaced by Denis Napthine. Napthine led the Coalition to a defeat in the 2014 Victorian state election.

==== Opposition (2014–present) ====
After the 2014 election, Matthew Guy was elected leader. The Coalition arrangement was maintained while the Liberals and Nationals were in opposition. The coalition lost the 2018 election and suffered a significant swing against it, leading to the resignation of Guy as leader of the Liberal Party. He was replaced by Michael O'Brien as party leader.

In 2020 allegations were made of branch stacking, with an internal audit finding that some members had breached party rules by paying for other people's membership fees.

On 6 September 2021, a few Liberal MPs including Guy resigned from O'Brien's shadow cabinet or from parliamentary party positions. O'Brien refused to step down as party leader as "he believed he had the support of the majority of MPs" ahead of a possible leadership challenge. The following day, Guy replaced O'Brien as party leader in a leadership spill. Cindy McLeish was replaced by David Southwick as deputy party leader.

In May 2022, Bernie Finn was expelled from the Victorian Liberal Party for "a series of inflammatory social media posts", including calling for abortion to be made illegal in all circumstances, and comparing the Victorian Premier to Adolf Hitler.

Following the 2022 Victorian state election, the party's director Sam McQuestin, stepped down citing 'internal challenges' in the months leading into the state election. McQuestin is set to be replaced by West Australian Liberal party state director Stuart Smith after a three-month search.

John Pesutto was elected leader of the Liberal Party on 8 December 2022, winning the party room ballot by one vote against Brad Battin. Under Pesutto's leadership, in March 2023 he attempted to expel Liberal MP Moira Deeming from the party room after she spoke at an anti-trans rally outside the Victorian Parliament, but the vote failed 18–11. Two months later, Deeming threatened to sue Pesutto following the first attempt to expel her and associate her with neo-Nazis. She was subsequently expelled from the party room 19 votes to 11. Following that vote, Pesutto was Booed by supporters of Deeming during a state council speech.

The Victorian Liberal Party endorsed candidates for the first time in the party's history for the 2024 Melbourne City Council election.

On 27 December 2024, Brad Battin deposed Pesutto in a leadership spill. The cabinet having a lack of males and coming at a time when Liberals are in fact performing relatively well to Labor in polls have drawn some criticism and doubts at the prospect of the party. Battin was deposed by Jess Wilson in another leadership spill on 18 November 2025, less than 12 months after the previous spill. Wilson became the first woman to lead the Victorian Liberals.

== Leadership ==
=== Leaders ===
#	Leader	Electorate	Term start	Term end	Time in office	Elections contested	Premiership	Departure notes
1	Thomas Hollway (1906–1971)	Ballarat (1932–1952)	5 March 1945	4 December 1951	6 years, 274 days	1945, 1947, 1950	1947–1950	Deposed
2	Les Norman (1913–1997)	Glen Iris (1947–1952)	4 December 1951	19 December 1952	1 year, 15 days	1952	No	Lost his seat of Glen Iris in the 1952 state election
3	Trevor Oldham (1900–1953)	Malvern (1945–1953)	19 December 1952	2 May 1953	134 days	No	No	Died in office
4	Sir Henry Bolte (1908–1990)	Hampden (1947–1972)	3 June 1953	23 August 1972	19 years, 81 days	1955, 1958, 1961, 1964, 1967, 1970	1955–1972	Resigned
5	Dick Hamer (1916–2004)	Kew (1971–1981)	23 August 1972	5 June 1981	8 years, 286 days	1973, 1976, 1979	1972–1981	Resigned
6	Lindsay Thompson (1923–2008)	Malvern (1970–1982)	5 June 1981	26 October 1982	1 year, 143 days	1982	1981–1982	Resigned
7	Jeff Kennett (1948–)	Burwood (1976–1999)	26 October 1982	23 May 1989	6 years, 209 days	1985, 1988	No	Deposed
8	Alan Brown (1946–)	Gippsland West (1985–1996)	23 May 1989	23 April 1991	1 year, 335 days	No	No	Deposed
(7)	Jeff Kennett (1948–)	Burwood (1976–1999)	23 April 1991	26 October 1999	8 years, 186 days	1992, 1996, 1999	1992–1999	Resigned
9	Denis Napthine (1952–)	Portland (1988–2002)	26 October 1999	20 August 2002	2 years, 298 days	No	No	Deposed
10	Robert Doyle (1953–)	Malvern (1992–2006)	20 August 2002	8 May 2006	3 years, 261 days	2002	No	Resigned
11	Ted Baillieu (1953–)	Hawthorn (1999–2014)	8 May 2006	6 March 2013	6 years, 302 days	2006, 2010	2010–2013	Resigned
(9)	Denis Napthine (1952–)	South-West Coast (2002–2015)	6 March 2013	4 December 2014	1 year, 273 days	2014	2013–2014	Resigned
12	Matthew Guy (1974–)	Bulleen (2014–)	4 December 2014	6 December 2018	4 years, 2 days	2018	No	Resigned
13	Michael O'Brien (1971–)	Malvern (2006–2026)	6 December 2018	7 September 2021	2 years, 275 days	No	No	Deposed
(12)	Matthew Guy (1974–)	Bulleen (2014–)	7 September 2021	8 December 2022	1 year, 92 days	2022	No	Resigned
14	John Pesutto (1970–)	Hawthorn (2022–)	8 December 2022	27 December 2024	2 years, 19 days	No	No	Deposed
15	Brad Battin (1975–)	Berwick (2022–)	27 December 2024	18 November 2025	1 year, 325 days	No	No	Deposed
16	Jess Wilson (1990–)	Kew (2022–)	18 November 2025	Incumbent	364 days	2026	No	

=== Deputy leaders ===
#	Deputy Leader	Electorate	Term start	Term end	Time in office	Leader	Departure notes
1	Ian Macfarlan (1881–1964)	Brighton (1928–1945)	5 March 1945	2 October 1945	211 days	Thomas Hollway	Became Premier with the support of breakaway Liberals following the collapse of Albert Dunstan's ministry
2	Trevor Oldham (1900–1953)	Malvern (1945–1953)	22 November 1945	14 November 1947	1 year, 357 days	Thomas Hollway	Resigned
3	Wilfrid Kent Hughes (1895–1970)	Kew (1927–1949)	14 November 1947	28 October 1949	1 year, 348 days	Thomas Hollway	Resigned to transfer to federal politics
(2)	Trevor Oldham (1900–1953)	Malvern (1945–1953)	8 November 1949	4 December 1951	2 years, 26 days	Thomas Hollway	Deposed
4	Henry Bolte (1908–1990)	Hampden (1947–1972)	4 December 1951	3 June 1953	1 year, 181 days	Les Norman	Became leader following the death of Trevor Oldham
4	Henry Bolte (1908–1990)	Hampden (1947–1972)	4 December 1951	3 June 1953	1 year, 181 days	Trevor Oldham	Became leader following the death of Trevor Oldham
5	Arthur Rylah (1909–1974)	Kew (1949–1971)	3 June 1953	21 April 1971	17 years, 322 days	Sir Henry Bolte	Resigned due to ill health
6	Dick Hamer (1916–2004)	Kew (1971–1981)	21 April 1971	23 August 1972	1 year, 124 days	Sir Henry Bolte	Became leader following the resignation of Sir Henry Bolte
7	Lindsay Thompson (1923–2008)	Malvern (1970–1982)	23 August 1972	5 June 1981	8 years, 286 days	Dick Hamer	Became leader following the resignation of Dick Hamer
8	Bill Borthwick (1924–2001)	Monbulk (1967–1982)	5 June 1981	7 April 1982	306 days	Lindsay Thompson	Lost his seat of Monbulk in the 1982 state election
9	Rob Maclellan (1934–)	Berwick (1976–1992)	7 April 1982	5 March 1985	2 years, 332 days	Lindsay Thompson	Deposed
9	Rob Maclellan (1934–)	Berwick (1976–1992)	7 April 1982	5 March 1985	2 years, 332 days	Jeff Kennett	Deposed
10	Tom Austin (1923–2002)	Ripon (1976–1992)	5 March 1985	6 October 1987	2 years, 215 days	Jeff Kennett	Resigned
11	Alan Brown (1946–)	Gippsland West (1985–1996)	6 October 1987	23 May 1989	1 year, 229 days	Jeff Kennett	Became leader following a successful challenge against Jeff Kennett
12	Roger Pescott (1946–)	Bennettswood (1985–1992)	23 May 1989	24 July 1990	1 year, 62 days	Alan Brown	Resigned in failed bid to transfer to federal politics
13	Alan Stockdale (1945–)	Brighton (1985–1999)	24 July 1990	23 April 1991	273 days	Alan Brown	Deposed
14	Phil Gude (1941–)	Hawthorn (1985–1999)	23 April 1991	23 September 1999	8 years, 153 days	Jeff Kennett	Resigned
15	Denis Napthine (1952–)	Portland (1988–2002)	23 September 1999	26 October 1999	33 days	Jeff Kennett	Became leader following the resignation of Jeff Kennett
16	Louise Asher (1956–)	Brighton (1999–2018)	26 October 1999	20 August 2002	2 years, 298 days	Denis Napthine	Deposed
17	Phil Honeywood (1960–)	Warrandyte (1988–2006)	20 August 2002	28 March 2006	3 years, 220 days	Robert Doyle	Resigned
(16)	Louise Asher (1956–)	Brighton (1999–2018)	28 March 2006	4 December 2014	8 years, 251 days	Robert Doyle	Resigned
(16)	Louise Asher (1956–)	Brighton (1999–2018)	28 March 2006	4 December 2014	8 years, 251 days	Ted Baillieu	Resigned
(16)	Louise Asher (1956–)	Brighton (1999–2018)	28 March 2006	4 December 2014	8 years, 251 days	Denis Napthine	Resigned
18	David Hodgett (1963–)	Croydon (2014–2026)	4 December 2014	6 December 2018	4 years, 2 days	Matthew Guy	Resigned
19	Cindy McLeish (1962–)	Eildon (2014–)	6 December 2018	7 September 2021	2 years, 275 days	Michael O'Brien	Deposed
20	David Southwick (1968–)	Caulfield (2010–)	7 September 2021	27 December 2024	5 years, 71 days	Matthew Guy	Deposed
20	David Southwick (1968–)	Caulfield (2010–)	7 September 2021	27 December 2024	5 years, 71 days	John Pesutto	Deposed
21	Sam Groth (1987–)	Nepean (2022–2026)	27 December 2024	28 January 2026	1 year, 32 days	Brad Battin	Resigned
21	Sam Groth (1987–)	Nepean (2022–2026)	27 December 2024	28 January 2026	1 year, 32 days	Jess Wilson	Resigned
(20)	David Southwick (1968–)	Caulfield (2010–)	28 January 2026	Incumbent	293 days	Jess Wilson	

== Senior Figures ==
=== State presidents of the Victorian Liberal Party ===
1945–1948: William Anderson

1948–1949: Magnus Cormack

1949–1950: Dan Mackinnon

1950–1952: William Anderson

1952–1956: John Anderson

1956–1959: Rutherford Guthrie

1959–1962: John Buchan

1962–1965: William Snell

1965–1966: Andrew Peacock

1966–1970: Robert Southey

1970–1973: Phillip Russell

1973–1976: Peter Hardie

1976–1979: Joy Mein

1979–1982: Richard Alston

1982–1984: Stewart McArthur

1984–1987: Eda Ritchie

1987–1992: Michael Kroger

1992–1998: Ted Baillieu

1997–2000: Joy Howley

2000–2003: Ian Carson

2003–2006: Helen Kroger

2006–2007: Russell Hannan

2007–2011: David Kemp

2011–2015: Tony Snell

2015–2018: Michael Kroger

2019–2022: Robert Clark

2022–2023: Greg Mirabella

2023–2026: Philip Davis

2026-present: Brian Loughnane

=== State Directors of the Victorian Liberal Party ===
1945–1971: J V McConnell

1971–1974: Leo Hawkins

1975–1976: Timothy Pascoe

1976–1977: Graham Jennings

1977–1983: Neville Hughes

1984–1987: John Ridley

1987–1988: David Kemp

1989–1994: Petro Georgiou

1994–2000: Peter Poggioli

2000–2003: Brian Loughnane

2003–2008: Julian Sheezel

2008–2011: Tony Nutt

2011–2015: Damien Mantach

2015–2017: Simon Frost

2017–2019: Nick Demiris

2019–2022: Sam McQuestin

2023–2025: Stuart Smith

2025-present: Alyson Hannam

== Election results ==
=== Legislative Assembly ===
Election	Leader	Votes	%	Seats	+/–	Position	Status
1950	Thomas Hollway	491,448	40.69	27 / 65	Steady	1st	Coalition (1950)
1950	Thomas Hollway	491,448	40.69	27 / 65	Steady	1st	Opposition (1950–1952)
1950	Thomas Hollway	491,448	40.69	27 / 65	Steady	1st	Minority (1952)
1950	Thomas Hollway	491,448	40.69	27 / 65	Steady	1st	Support (1952)
1952	Les Norman	255,685	24.85	11 / 65	▼16	▼3rd	Crossbench
1955	Henry Bolte	487,408	37.78	34 / 66	▲23	▲1st	Majority
1958	Henry Bolte	508,678	37.18	39 / 66	▲5	1st	Majority
1961	Henry Bolte	521,777	36.44	39 / 66	Steady	1st	Majority
1964	Henry Bolte	597,748	39.63	38 / 66	▼1	1st	Majority
1967	Henry Bolte	589,985	37.49	44 / 73	▲6	1st	Majority
1970	Henry Bolte	614,094	36.70	42 / 73	▼2	1st	Majority
1973	Rupert Hamer	803,382	42.34	46 / 73	▲4	1st	Majority
1976	Rupert Hamer	939,481	45.87	52 / 81	▲6	1st	Majority
1979	Rupert Hamer	881,366	41.44	41 / 81	▼11	1st	Majority
1982	Lindsay Thompson	860,669	38.33	24 / 81	▼17	▼2nd	Opposition
1985	Jeff Kennett	1,003,003	41.86	31 / 88	▲7	2nd	Opposition
1988	Jeff Kennett	986,311	40.51	33 / 88	▲2	2nd	Opposition
1992	Jeff Kennett	1,153,770	44.16	52 / 88	▲19	▲1st	Coalition
1996	Jeff Kennett	1,212,933	43.99	49 / 88	▼3	1st	Coalition
1999	Jeff Kennett	1,194,998	42.22	36 / 88	▼13	▼2nd	Opposition
2002	Robert Doyle	985,011	33.91	17 / 88	▼19	2nd	Opposition
2006	Ted Baillieu	1,022,110	34.44	23 / 88	▲6	2nd	Opposition
2010	Ted Baillieu	1,203,654	38.03	35 / 88	▲12	2nd	Coalition
2014	Denis Napthine	1,223,663	36.47	30 / 88	▼5	2nd	Opposition
2018	Matthew Guy	1,069,137	30.42	21 / 88	▼9	2nd	Opposition
2022	Matthew Guy	992,492	29.74	18 / 88	▼3	2nd	Opposition

=== House of Representatives ===
Election	Votes	%	Seats	+/–
1949	535,214	41.40	17 / 33	▲10
1951	571,398	43.60	15 / 33	▼2
1954	572,233	45.20	15 / 33	Steady
1955	549,985	41.40	20 / 33	▲5
1958	531,404	37.80	18 / 33	▼2
1961	515,792	34.80	18 / 33	Steady
1963	600,306	39.10	18 / 33	Steady
1966	622,708	39.80	19 / 33	▲1
1969	626,474	37.60	18 / 34	▼1
1972	606,273	33.60	14 / 34	▼4
1974	738,236	36.40	12 / 34	▼2
1975	887,685	42.30	19 / 34	▲7
1977	842,545	39.60	20 / 33	▲1
1980	874,395	39.10	13 / 33	▼7
1983	869,542	37.10	7 / 33	▼6
1984	842,423	36.90	11 / 39	▲4
1987	922,680	38.00	12 / 39	▲1
1990	1,018,740	39.70	21 / 38	▲9
1993	1,102,965	40.20	17 / 38	▼4
1996	1,106,556	39.90	19 / 37	▲2
1998	1,053,990	37.10	16 / 37	▼3
2001	1,154,493	39.10	15 / 37	▼1
2004	1,302,038	43.24	16 / 37	▲1
2007	1,206,992	38.09	14 / 37	▼2
2010	1,159,301	36.45	12 / 37	▼2
2013	1,320,417	40.08	14 / 37	▲2
2016	1,273,419	37.01	14 / 37	Steady
2019	1,288,805	34.88	12 / 38	▼2
2022	1,010,453	29.82	8 / 39	▼4
2025	1,117,878	27.58	6 / 38	▼2

== See also ==
- Coalition (Victoria)
- Victorian National Party
- United Australia Party – Victoria
