= Brad Battin =

Australian politician (born 1975)

Brad Battin MP
- Battin in 2025

Leader of the Opposition in Victoria
- In office 27 December 2024 – 18 November 2025
- Premier: Jacinta Allan
- Deputy: Sam Groth
- Preceded by: John Pesutto
- Succeeded by: Jess Wilson

Leader of the Victorian Liberal Party
- In office 27 December 2024 – 18 November 2025
- Deputy: Sam Groth
- Preceded by: John Pesutto
- Succeeded by: Jess Wilson

Member of the Victorian Legislative Assembly for Berwick
- Incumbent
- Assumed office 26 November 2022
- Preceded by: New seat

Member of the Victorian Legislative Assembly for Gembrook
- In office 27 November 2010 – 26 November 2022
- Preceded by: Tammy Lobato
- Succeeded by: Seat abolished

Personal details
- Born: Bradley William Battin; 12 December 1975 (age 50)
- Party: Liberal
- Occupation: Police officer

Bradley William Battin (born 12 December 1975) is an Australian politician who is currently serving as the member for Berwick. Battin served as the leader of the Victorian Liberal Party and Victorian opposition leader from December 2024 until November 2025. He has served as a member of the for Victorian Legislative Assembly since 2010, first for Gembrook from 2010 to 2022, and then Berwick after 2022.

Battin was elected to the Victorian Liberal Party leadership in a leadership spill in December 2024 caused by the leader John Pesutto losing a defamation lawsuit to Moira Deeming. Battin faced a leadership spill in November 2025 and was defeated by Jess Wilson, due to poor polling performance and several scandals.

== Early life, education, and pre-political career ==
Bradley William Battin was born on 12 December 1975 to parents Philip and Joan, and raised in the Melbourne suburbs of Harkaway and Berwick. Battin attended Harkaway Primary School and Berwick Secondary College, and left school at 15.

Out of high school, Battin worked several hospitality and customer service jobs, before joining Victoria Police in 2001. He was posted to Dandenong Police Station, and transferred to Prahran Police Station in 2005. During his time as police officer, he obtained a Diploma in Public Safety (Policing) with Victoria Police, and a Graduate Diploma in Adolescent Health and Welfare from the University of Melbourne, along with reaching the rank of Senior Constable.

In 2007, Battin left the police force and purchased a Bakers Delight franchise in Wheelers Hill with his wife, owning it for three years.

Battin has worked in several volunteer organisations, including being the president of the Clematis Country Fire Authority brigade and a fundraising chair of the Fred Hollows Foundation.

As an adult, Battin has completed a Graduate Certificate in Business and a Master in Business Administration at Victoria University.

== Member of Parliament ==
Battin was first elected as the member for Gembrook at the November 2010 state election, gaining it from Labor's Tammy Lobato on a margin of 6.8%, representing an approximately 7.5% swing in the Liberal Party's favour.

At the 2014 Victorian state election, Battin experienced a favourable distribution in his seat, with ABC News reporting that the new notional margin from the last election was 8.8%. Battin was elected solely on first preferences and had a new margin of 9.0%. After the election, Matthew Guy was elected leader of the Liberal Party, whose shadow cabinet Battin was promoted to, becoming Shadow Minister for Emergency Services and Shadow Minister for Environment.

During his time as Shadow Minister for Emergency Services, Battin made an incorrect statement to Parliament, claiming that there was a lack of "career firefighters" on the ground during the first hours of the Black Saturday bushfires. His statement was unsupported by the findings of the royal commission that investigated and reported on the events. He later backtracked his comments, saying he was only referring to a specific fire at Bunyip State Park, which was also untrue, as professional firefighters had been there three days prior. Battin later apologised for his mistake on radio and on social media. Battin attracted strong criticism from many firefighters, including Metropolitan Fire Brigade Acting Commander Mick Tisbury who also called for him to step down, saying:

We're disgusted by the actions of the allegedly honourable member for Gembrook[.] We demand that he stands aside ... I really think he needs to reconsider his position as a member of parliament. He obviously knows nothing about firefighting, he doesn't know what we do and he doesn't respect us.

He was additionally denounced by Emergency Services Minister James Merlino, who commented that "[Battin] should be ashamed of himself; there is no limit to his disgraceful comments when it comes to our hardworking firefighters".

In September 2017, after a reshuffle in Matthew Guy's ministry, Battin left the position of Shadow Minister for the Environment, becoming Victoria's first Shadow Minister for the Building Industry, while retaining the emergency services portfolio.

At the 2018 state election, Battin suffered an 8.2% swing against him to Labor's Michael Galea, being reduced to a margin of 0.8%. In the aftermath of the election, Michael O'Brien became the new opposition leader, after which he created his shadow ministry. In the new ministry, Battin kept emergency services portfolio, gained the youth justice, crime prevention, and victim support portfolios, and did not continue as the Shadow Minister for the Building Industry.

In March 2020, Battin lost the emergency services portfolio, while becoming the Shadow Minister for Roads (Metropolitan) and Shadow Minister for Road Safety and the TAC.

=== 2021 leadership challenges ===
On 16 March 2021, Battin moved a spill against the leader of the Victorian Liberal Party, Michael O'Brien. According to ABC News, the spill was a result O'Brien's failure to effectively criticise the Andrews government's response to the COVID-19 pandemic. The Australian Financial Review reported that Battin was relying on MPs loyal to the prior leader of the party, Matthew Guy, who were unhappy with O'Brien's leadership, to vote for himself. However, in total Battin's motion only received nine votes, to O'Brien's 22. Former Liberal premier Jeff Kennett characterised Battin's spill as "stupid" and "ill-conceived". Following his loss, Battin resigned from his shadow ministry positions, with those who supported him joining suit, after O'Brien had said he would sack anyone who voted against his leadership. After his loss, Battin said that he had "[no] regrets" for moving the spill and backed O'Brien's leadership.

In September 2021, another leadership challenge was launched against O'Brien, this time by Matthew Guy, who won, becoming Victorian Liberal leader and organising a new cabinet. In the new shadow ministry, Battin and his supporters from the front bench before the challenge returned. Battin gained back the emergency service portfolio. He also became Shadow Minister for Community Safety and Victim Support, Shadow Minister for Police, and Shadow Minister for Corrections.

=== 2022 state and leadership elections ===
At the 2022 state election, a new map was used for the electorates, as per a 2021 re-distribution. In this re-distribution, the seat of Gembrook was abolished, and the seat of Berwick created, with half the voters from the former seat of Gembrook, and the other half from nearby electorates. ABC News estimated the margin of the new seat to be 1.3% based 2018 election results. Battin contested the seat and won on a margin of 4.7%, representing a notional swing of 3.4% towards him.

After the Liberal Party's loss the 2022 state election, Battin ran in the subsequent Liberal Party state leadership election after previous leader Matthew Guy resigned. He was endorsed by two of the candidates for deputy leader Ryan Smith and Richard Riordan. The contest came down to one vote, with John Pesutto, the moderate member for Hawthorn, winning with 17 votes to Battin's 16. After the election of Pesutto, Battin was offered shadow cabinet positions, eventuating in him becoming Shadow Minister for Criminal Justice Reform, while keeping the portfolio areas of police, youth justice, crime prevention and corrections. Speaking after the spill, Battin said he will "back John Pesutto 100 per cent."

== Opposition leader ==
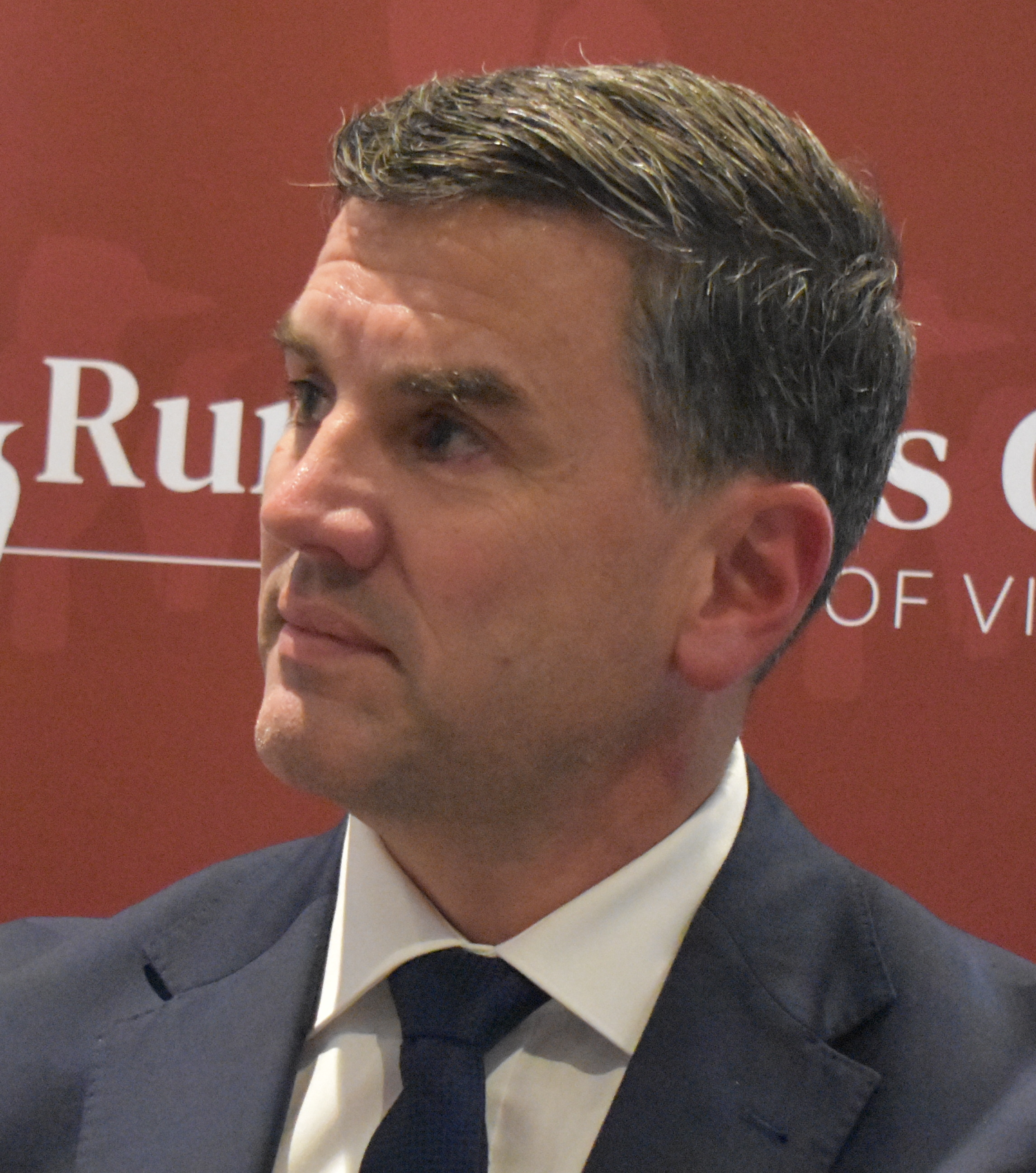
Battin in 2025

On 11 December 2024, Liberal leader John Pesutto lost a defamation case to Moira Deeming, due to claiming she was a associated with neo-Nazis, after she organised a rally that was attended by the National Socialist Network. After the rally, on 12 May 2023, the Victorian Liberal Party voted to oust Deeming, however Battin did not support the motion, attempting to delay the vote a week with fellow MP Richard Riordan. On 21 December, The Age reported that Battin would move a spill against Pesutto and vote to re-admit Deeming, as a result of Pesutto's defamation loss. The spill motion against passed 18 votes to 10, after which Battin and MPs Chris Crewther and Jess Wilson went into a leadership contest, in which Wilson placed third. In the second round of voting Battin attained 21 votes to Crewther's seven, hence becoming Leader of the Victorian Liberal Party and Leader of the Opposition. On 7 January 2025, Battin unveiled the whole of his shadow cabinet, with former leader John Pesutto notably excluded. The Age reported that allies of Deeming were rewarded in the new cabinet with promotions.

On 8 February 2025, two by-elections took place. In Werribee, generally considered to be a Labor stronghold, with a margin of 10.9% at the 2022 election, was reduced to 0.5%, representing a 10.4% swing. In Prahran, Liberal Rachel Westaway gained the seat from the Victorian Greens, holding it on a margin of 1.5%. The results were generally considered a indictment of the Allan government, and supportive of Battin's Liberal party. Battin commented there was "a very strong message in this campaign and this election" for Labor, while Ben Carroll said voters were "loud and clear" that they "need[ed] more" from the government.

=== Policies ===
Battin (white shirt) at the North Richmond Victoria Street Lunar New Year Festival in February 2025

As leader, Battin emphasised the issue of crime, given the rise in violent crime in the state. He focused on crime prevention and youth engagement. He advocated for strengthening police abilities so that police could scan people without a search warrant. Additionally, he introduced a "break bail, face jail" policy, along with a proposed ban on face coverings at protests and increased police powers at protests. Battin vowed that, if elected, he would have resigned if crime rates did not decrease after his first term.

Under his leadership, the Liberal Party promised, that if elected, it would only follow through with the Suburban Rail Loop project if tunneling begins.

During Battin's tenure as leader, the Liberal Party of Victoria promised, if elected, it would revoke treaty legislation passed in October 2025 by the state government. This Liberal Party, under John Pesutto, had already dropped support for the treaty after the Voice referendum was unsuccessful.

=== Controversies ===
==== Luxury cruise scandal ====
In March 2025, Battin started a controversy when he was absent from the Parliament during the introduction of high-profile crime reform legislation by Victorian Premier Jacinta Allan. Battin claimed his week long absence was as he was visiting his parents who were impacted by Cyclone Alfred, after which it revealed that he had spent four days on the luxury cruise liner Quantum of the Seas. The scandal was compared to former Prime Minister Scott Morrison taking an overseas holiday in Hawaii during a bushfire crisis in Australia in 2019. According to The Guardian, Battin was criticised by one of his own MPs, who said "It's not on the same level as ScoMo jetting off to Hawaii during the bushfires but it's a pretty bad look". Battin later admitted that he was "not upfront" about taking a luxury cruise but that he "did not regret" his failure to appear in Parliament to take a holiday.

In a press conference, Attorney-General Sonya Kilkenny criticised Battin for his absence, saying "While the Liberal leader was living it up on a cruise last week, the Allan Labor Government was announcing Australia's toughest bail laws ever".

==== Firetruck speech ====
In July 2025, Battin attended and gave a speech on top of a firetruck at a protest in Werribee held by a small number of rural farmers, Country Fire Authority volunteers and Peter Marshall, the National Secretary of the United Firefighters Union of Australia. The protest regarded Victorian Premier Jacinta Allan and government changes designed to increase funding for emergency services including the CFA, Victoria State Emergency Service and the 000 emergency telephone number. The protest included CFA firetrucks that had been emblazoned with various anti-Government protest slogans alongside Liberal Party branded advertising posters, with one of the vehicles having the phrase "ditch the bitch" featured prominently. His appearance was viewed in the media as reminiscent of Tony Abbott's 2011 appearance at a protest against the Julia Gillard government carbon tax where he and a number of MPs from the Liberal party gave speeches alongside signs saying "Ditch the Witch" and "Bob Brown's Bitch". Battin refused to apologise for his appearance at the protest or state whether he had seen the slogans during his attendance.

The slogan was criticised by anti-domestic violence organisations including Respect Victoria. Acting Premier Jaclyn Symes described Battin as "turning a blind to sexist slogans at rallies he attends", as well as referencing ongoing issues within the wider Liberal Party regarding their perception among women in the country. In the wake of the issue, CFA leadership issued a warning over participating in partisan politics and urged the organisation's members to remain apolitical.

==== Stabbing press conference ====
On 19 August 2025, he diverted from his morning commute in order to hold a press conference at the scene of the crime where the body of the victim was still being processed by forensic analysts. This also came when neither the identity of the victim was formally known nor the circumstances of the victim's death having been established. Battin defended his decision to politicise the murder, saying he was showing "the consequences of what happens when you don't act [on crime]." Victorian Government minister Colin Brooks requested that Battin apologise to the family of the man; Battin rejected this, saying he had "no regrets" over the incident. Detective Inspector Dean Thomas from the Victoria Police homicide squad declined to comment when asked if it was appropriate for Battin to hold a press conference at an active crime scene.

=== Cabinet re-shuffle ===
Following the resignation of senior Liberal MPs Michael O'Brien and David Hodgett, on 11 October 2025, a reshuffle of Battin's shadow ministry occurred. The reshuffle saw three first term MPs, Nicole Werner, Nick McGowan, and Richard Welch. It also saw the promotion of former primary challenger Jess Wilson to the Shadow Treasurer portfolio, taking over from Battin ally James Newbury. Battin marketed this as a part of the Victorian coalition's 'fresh start', following a slipping performance in opinion polls. The Australian Financial Review reported that an anonymous Liberal MP criticised the re-shuffle for promoting factional allies of Battin, rather than basing the selection on merit.

Renewed leadership tensions ensued from the reshuffle, with both moderate and conservative factions expressing unhappiness with the decisions made by Battin. Speculation arose that Wilson or another Liberal MP would challenge Battin, however Wilson initially refused.

On 27 October 2025, Battin unveiled the outer shadow cabinet, with the controversial Moira Deeming promoted to the role of shadow assistant minister for local government, and excluded former leader John Pesutto, despite a push by Liberal MPs to reinclude him in the shadow cabinet.

=== 2025 leadership spill ===
On 17 November 2025, Battin was faced by a delegation of his party room members led by first term MP Jess Wilson. The group delivered a statement of no confidence in his leadership and declared their intent to hold a leadership spill the following day.

On 18 November 2025 the party room passed a spill motion 19 votes for 13, vacating Battin's position as Opposition Leader and Sam Groth's position as Deputy. Battin refused to challenge for the leadership, leaving Jess Wilson to take the position unopposed. Groth nominated for, and retained his position, defeating David Southwick by 17 votes to 15.

After the spill, Battin became the shadow minister for police and corrections in Wilson's shadow ministry.

== Electoral history ==
Electoral history of Brad Battin in the Parliament of Victoria
Year	Electorate	Party	First Preference Result				Two Candidate Result			
Year	Electorate	Party	Votes	%	+%	Position	Votes	%	+%	Result
2010	Gembrook	Liberal	18,427	47.93	+7.77	1st	21,926	56.75	+7.35	Elected
2014	Gembrook	Liberal	20,646	54.7	+1.2	1st	22,324	59.0	+0.2	Elected
2018	Gembrook	Liberal	21,202	48.26	−6.42	1st	22,313	50.79	−8.16	Elected
2022	Berwick	Liberal	20,031	45.2	−2.6	1st	24,230	54.7	+3.4	Elected

== Political positions ==
Battin is considered to be factionally conservative within the Liberal Party. However, he has disputed this, claiming in a January 2025 interview that there is "zero evidence of the fact of [him] being a conservative".

In an interview with Sky News, Battin stated that he opposes pill testing, saying "we need to make sure that kids can get referrals and referred in the right direction, rather than going in and saying it's ok to have the drugs at these festivals". In 2025, Battin stated that he supports further gas exploration.

=== Policing ===
In 2021, Battin supported increasing the age of criminal responsibility from 10 to 14. In 2024, Guardian Australia reported that Battin tended to be more progressive when it came to issues on criminal justice, citing his view that low-level and white collar crimes should not be met with prison sentences, and his endorsement of justice reinvestment initiatives.

=== Social issues ===
In 2015, Battin voted against a bill that gave Victorian same-sex couples the right to adopt, and a few years later vote against another bill on voluntary assisted dying. However, he said that his vote against the latter was due to the bill being "poorly constructed". In 2025, Battin supports Victoria's abortion legislation and has said he would be happy to attend Melbourne's pride march.

== Personal life ==
Brad is married to his wife Jo, with whom he has two daughters. Battin currently lives his electorate of Berwick with his family.

Battin is an atheist and a supporter of Geelong in the Australian Football League.

Victorian Legislative Assembly
Preceded by Tammy Lobato	Member for Gembrook; 2010–2022	District abolished
District created	Member for Berwick; 2022–present	Incumbent
Political offices
Preceded by John Pesutto	Leader of the Opposition of Victoria; 2024–2025	Succeeded by Jess Wilson
Party political offices
Preceded by John Pesutto	Leader of the Liberal Party in Victoria; 2024–2025	Succeeded by Jess Wilson
