= Damien Mantach =

Former Victorian Liberal Party state director

- Born: Launceston, Tasmania, Australia
- Citizenship: Australian
- Education: Launceston Church Grammar School
- Alma mater: Deakin University (Warrnambool campus)
- Occupation: Political strategist
- Status: Imprisoned
- Criminal charge: Fraud
- Penalty: 5 years in prison

Damien Mantach is a former Victorian Liberal Party state director who was imprisoned for fraud, and who is currently in prison since being sentenced.

== Early life ==
Mantach was born in Launceston Tasmania, he studied at Launeston Church Grammar School. After school Mantach went and studied at the Warrnambool campus of Deakin University.

Mantach was the State Director of the Tasmanian Liberal Party and worked on multiple campaigns. Mantach was involved in the police tapes scandal which was related to the resignation of Ted Baillieu and resulted in Denis Napthine becoming Premier in 2013.

== Conviction ==
Mantach was arrested for defrauding the Liberal party by creating false invoices and marketing campaigns. He was sentenced to five years in prison.
