= John Pesutto =

Australian politician (born 1970)

John Pesutto MP
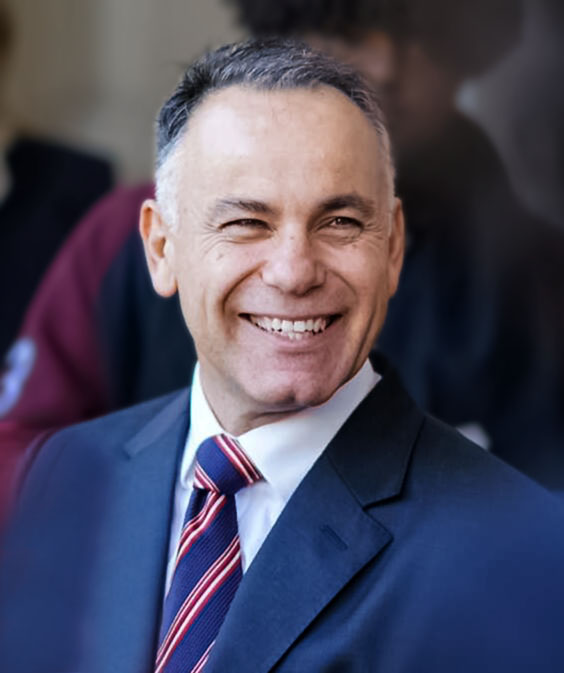
- Pesutto in 2023

Leader of the Opposition in Victoria
- In office 8 December 2022 – 27 December 2024
- Premier: Daniel Andrews; Jacinta Allan
- Deputy: Peter Walsh; Danny O'Brien
- Preceded by: Matthew Guy
- Succeeded by: Brad Battin

Leader of the Victorian Liberal Party
- In office 8 December 2022 – 27 December 2024
- Deputy: David Southwick
- Preceded by: Matthew Guy
- Succeeded by: Brad Battin

Member of the Victorian Legislative Assembly for Hawthorn
- Incumbent
- Assumed office 26 November 2022
- Preceded by: John Kennedy
- In office 29 November 2014 – 24 November 2018
- Preceded by: Ted Baillieu
- Succeeded by: John Kennedy

Personal details
- Born: 5 September 1970 (age 56) Traralgon, Victoria, Australia
- Party: Liberal
- Spouse: Betty Pesutto
- Children: 3
- Education: University of Melbourne
- Occupation: Politician
- Profession: Lawyer
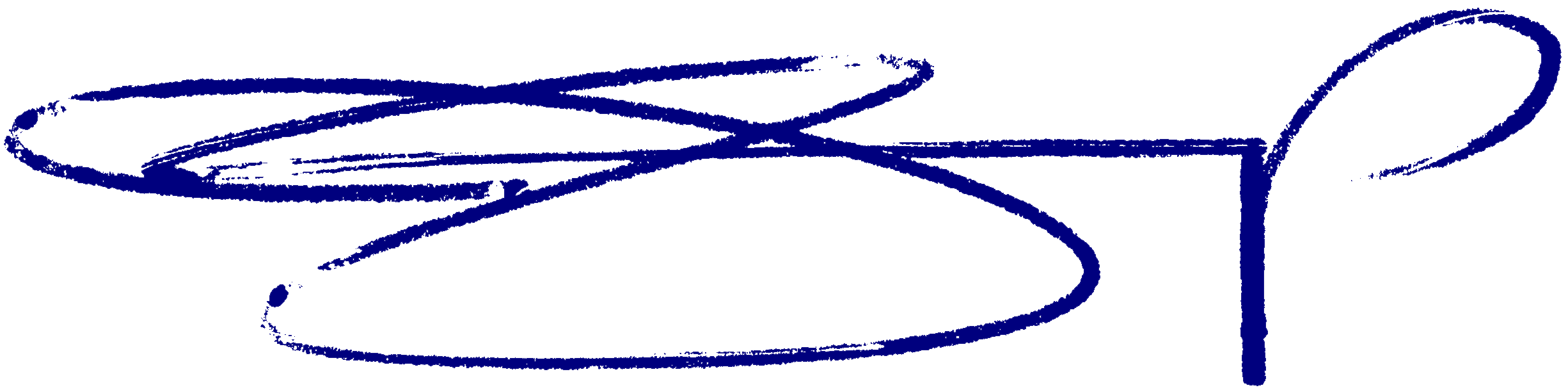
- Signature
- Website: johnpesutto.com.au

John Pesutto (Italian: [pezˈutːo]; born 5 September 1970) is an Australian politician and lawyer who has served as the member for Hawthorn in the Victorian Legislative Assembly since 2022, having previously served from 2014 to 2018. He was the Leader of the Opposition in Victoria, while holding office as the leader of the Victorian Liberal Party, from 8 December 2022 until a leadership spill on 27 December 2024.

== Early life and career ==
Pesutto grew up in Traralgon, and is one of five children. Both of his parents are from Calabria in southern Italy. His father immigrated to Australia in 1961, and his mother immigrated in 1963. His father was an electrician and his mother was a machinist at McArthur's shoe factory in Traralgon.

Pesutto studied at Catholic Regional College Traralgon from 1983 to 1988, and studied a Bachelor of Laws/Bachelor of Commerce at the University of Melbourne from 1989 to 1993. He worked as a lawyer for Littleton Hackford from 1994 to 1996, as an Electorate Officer for Russell Broadbent from 1996 to 1997, as a lawyer for Henty Jepson & Kelly from 1997 to 2006, as a lawyer for Phillips Fox from 2006 to 2009, as a self-employed consultant from 2009 to 2011 and Director of the Productivity and Employment Unit with the Institute of Public Affairs in 2010, and in the Office of the Premier from 2011 to 2014 as Counsel to Denis Napthine, Chief of Staff to the Health Minister and as a senior advisor to Ted Baillieu. During his career in private legal practice, Pesutto practised with a focus on industrial relations and employment matters, while his consultancy had a focus on advising government departments and public sector agencies on governance and performance issues.

After losing his seat at the 2018 Victorian state election, Pesutto took up an honorary post in the school of government at the University of Melbourne, established his own consultancy firm called Hugo Benice Advisory offering legal work and media, government and competition advice, and maintained a presence in the media through writing columns for The Age and appearing on ABC Radio and Joy FM.

== Political career ==
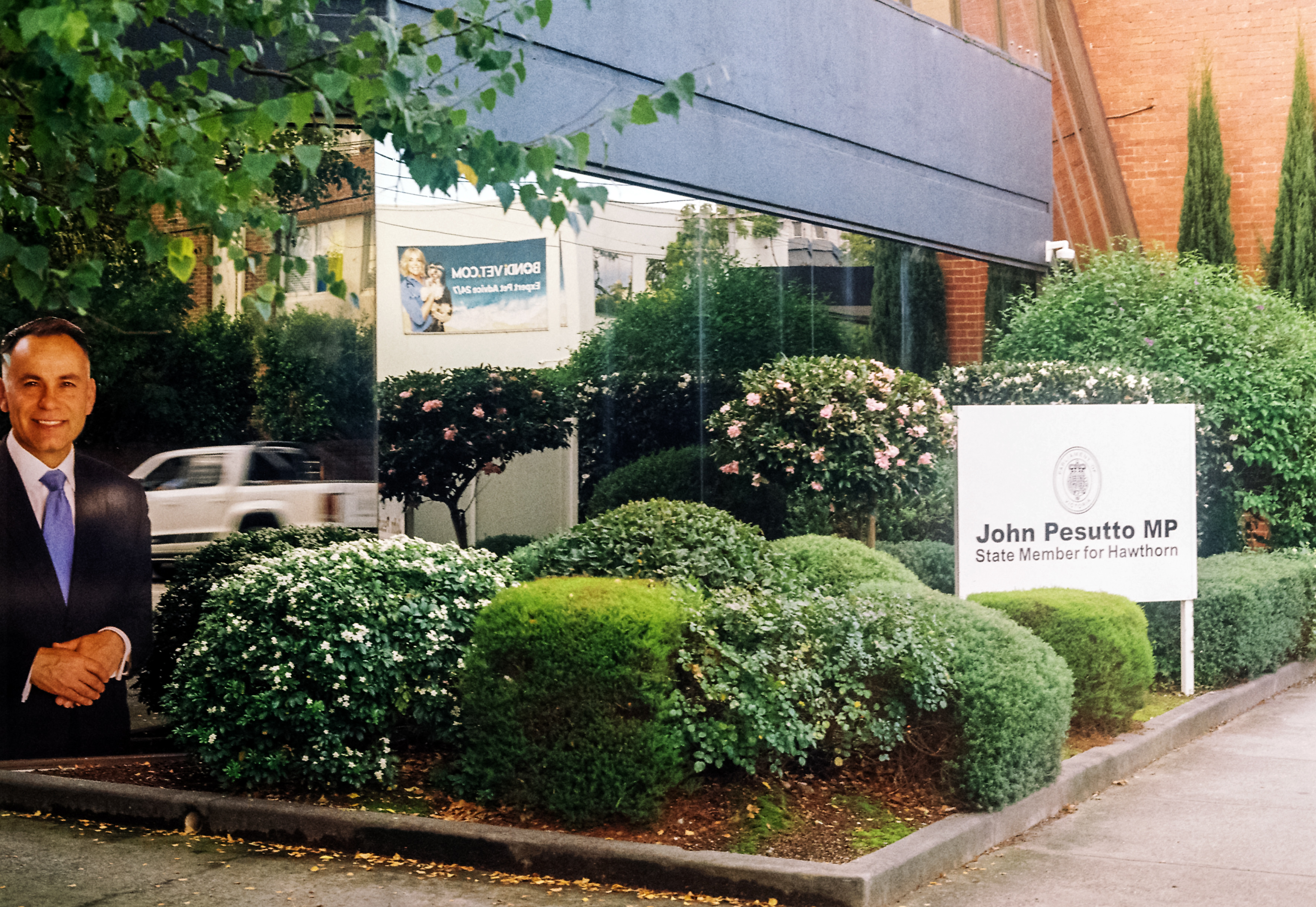
Pesutto's Electorate office in Hawthorn

Pesutto's first preselection bid was for the seat of McMillan in 1994, which he lost to Russell Broadbent. Pesutto ran for Liberal preselection for Kooyong at the 2010 federal election but lost to Josh Frydenberg. Pesutto also ran for preselection in Deakin at the 2013 federal election but lost to Michael Sukkar.

Pesutto was pre-selected as Liberal Party candidate for Hawthorn after defeating John Roskam of the Institute of Public Affairs for the position. He was successful at the 2014 state election. He was Shadow Attorney-General in Matthew Guy's first shadow ministry. He was defeated at the 2018 state election. He was a panelist on ABC on election night when he was told on live television that he had lost his seat to Labor's John Kennedy.

On 14 December 2021, John Pesutto was again endorsed as the Liberal candidate for Hawthorn at the 2022 Victorian state election. Pesutto won re-election in the state election on 26 November 2022 against Labor incumbent John Kennedy and teal independent challenger Melissa Lowe on a 1.7% margin.

=== Opposition leader (2022–2024) ===
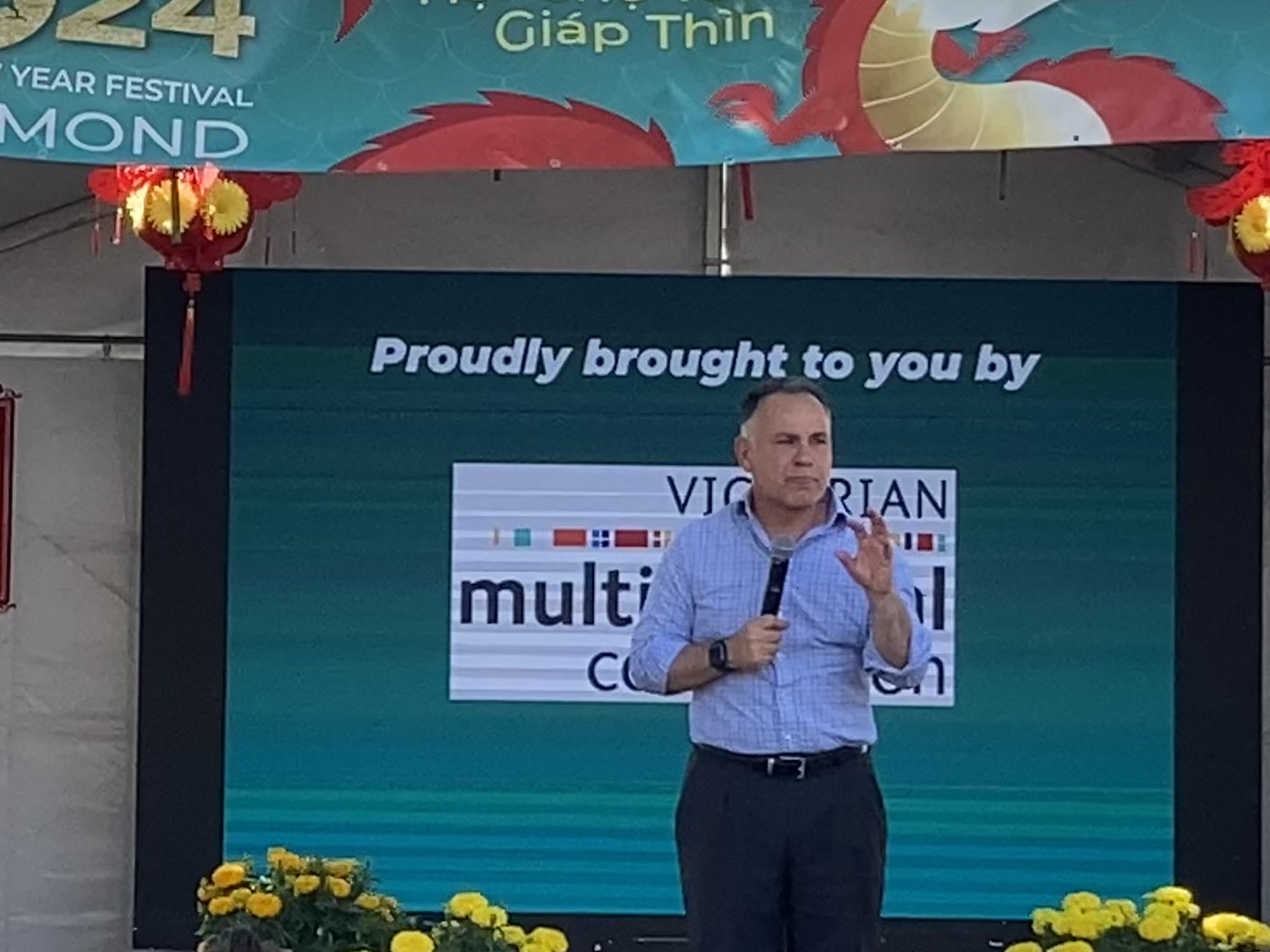
Pesutto speaking at a Lunar New Year Festival in February 2024

After Liberal leader Matthew Guy announced his resignation, Pesutto announced his candidacy for Liberal leader. Pesutto was elected leader of the Liberal Party on 8 December 2022, winning the party room ballot by one vote against Brad Battin.

==== Moira Deeming controversy ====
Moira Deeming

in March 2023, under Pesutto's leadership, his party considered expelling Liberal MP Moira Deeming from the party, but opted to suspend her from the party room for nine months. Deeming later initiated legal action against Pesutto, after he declined her demand to issue a media statement saying that he does not consider her a Nazi or Nazi sympathiser. This saga was part of a crisis within the Victorian Liberal Party in May 2023, when Pesutto's leadership was undermined by members of the hard-right faction of the Liberal Party, which two Liberal MPs labelled ‘terrorists’. Liberal Party elder Tony Barry described the situation as "The Victorian Liberal Party is like the space shuttle Columbia slamming into the Hindenburg and then landing on the deck of the Titanic". On 5 May 2023, Federal Liberal Party leader Peter Dutton refused to rule out an intervention into the Victorian Liberal Party branch. Deeming was eventually expelled on 11 May 2023, by a vote of 19–11. The vote was widely considered a test of Pesutto's leadership of the parliamentary Liberal party. On 20 May 2023, at a Liberal state council meeting in Bendigo, Pesutto was booed by attendees for his handling of the situation. The controversy resulted in the Victorian Liberals recording their lowest ever primary vote of 23% in published opinion polls. The Federal Liberal Women's Committee condemned Pesutto for suspending Deeming, and demanded he apologise and immediately reinstate Deeming to the party room.

Pesutto's actions in relation to the Moira Deeming affair led to three defamation lawsuits being filed against him by Deeming, Kellie-Jay Keen-Minshull and Angela Jones, with the three cases set be heard together in a 15-day trial to commence on 16 September 2024. On 16 May 2024, Pesutto settled the two cases involving Keen-Minshull and Jones, with the Deeming case remaining in place; Pesutto issued a public apology to the two, and as part of the settlement, he did not have to pay compensation but would share a portion of the legal costs. In December 2024, the Federal Court ruled that Pesutto had defamed Deeming by suggesting that she associates with Nazis, awarding her $300,000 in damages. Pesutto was ordered to pay $2,300,000 in costs, in addition to the damages and his own legal costs, raising the possibility of bankruptcy, which would force him out of parliament. On 19 June 2025, the Victorian Liberal party decided to loan $1.5 million to Pesutto to avoid him being declared bankrupt.

Following Deeming's court victory, a motion seeking to readmit Deeming to the Liberal party room was defeated with Pesutto casting a deciding vote against readmission. Deeming was later readmitted to the party room on the same day Pesutto was defeated in a leadership spill by his Shadow Police Minister, Brad Battin.

=== Electoral history ===
Electoral history of John Pesutto in the Parliament of Victoria
| Year | Electorate | Party | First Preference Result | | | | Two Candidate Result | | | |
| Year | Electorate | Party | Votes | % | +% | Position | Votes | % | +% | Result |
|---|---|---|---|---|---|---|---|---|---|---|
| 2014 | Hawthorn | Liberal | 20,551 | 54.5 | −6.3 | 1st | 22,041 | 58.6 | −8.0 | Elected |
| 2018 | Hawthorn | Liberal | 17,231 | 43.89 | −10.60 | 1st | 19,463 | 49.58 | −9.01 | Lost |
| 2022 | Hawthorn | Liberal | 18,728 | 42.3 | −1.8 | 1st | 22,927 | 51.7 | +2.3 | Elected |

== Political positions ==
Pesutto is considered to be factionally moderate within the Liberal Party. However, Pesutto has been criticised for failing to demonstrate or affirm his moderate credentials during his time in the Victorian parliament, and for consistently opposing progressive social policies, with Pesutto openly opposing pill testing, raising the age of criminal responsibility, the Indigenous Voice to Parliament and an Indigenous treaty during his tenure as leader of the Liberals.

=== Health ===
Pesutto has been outspoken against the Victorian government’s previously proposed payroll tax reforms, which he has argued threatens to close medical clinics and undermine bulk-billing services. He has argued that the proposed changes to payroll tax which would include contractor GPs and employee GPs who provide bulk-billed consultations, would significantly increase the cost of GP visits, disproportionately affecting vulnerable patients and potentially causing clinic closures. In May 2024, Pesutto announced that a future Coalition government will scrap the payroll tax on GPs. However a few weeks later, following significant backlash, the Allan Labor government backflipped on the payroll tax proposal for GPs.

=== Housing and planning ===
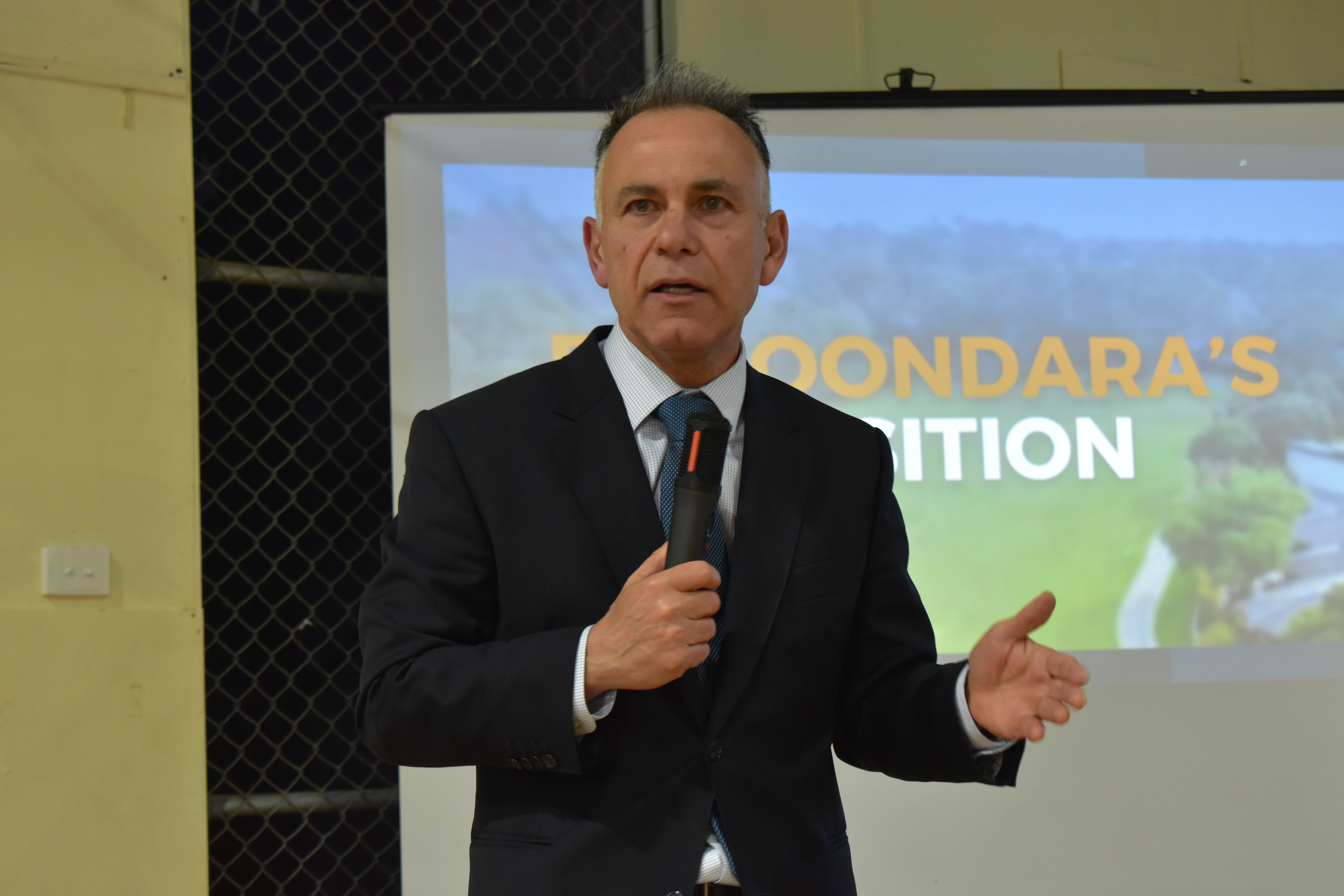
Pesutto discussing housing policy in Camberwell

In May 2024, Pesutto pledged new measures to reduce planning approval delays, focusing on cutting "red tape" for new residential housing developments. This would involve establishing clear timelines and costs for cultural heritage procedures, publishing annual audits of cultural heritage approvals linked to housing developments and introducing annual performance audits for Melbourne Water. He argues that the existing regulations increase costs for residential developers, ultimately affecting homebuyers. However, this policy proposal has faced criticism for allegedly exacerbating racial divisions over cultural heritage management. Critics including Premier Jacinta Allan and the First Peoples' Assembly argue that this approach could undermine the importance of cultural heritage protection, particularly for Indigenous communities.

=== Indigenous affairs ===
In early 2023, leading up to the unsuccessful 2023 Australian Indigenous Voice referendum, Pesutto remained undecided, citing a lack of detail on the proposal and allowed party room members to have a conscience vote. However in September 2023, Pesutto declared that he was voting "no" in the referendum but would not be campaigning against it. In January 2024, Pesutto announced that the Coalition would withdraw its support for a state-based treaty with Indigenous communities.

=== Infrastructure ===
Pesutto has pledged to pause and review the Suburban Rail Loop if the Coalition wins government in 2026, citing concerns about rising state debt, cost uncertainty, and the lack of funding available for other transport projects including the Western Rail Plan and Melbourne Airport Rail.

In March 2024, Pesutto announced a new policy aimed at improving performance and transparency within Victoria’s construction sector. The policy proposes to reinstate the Victorian Code of Practice for the Building and Construction Industry, which was abolished by the Andrews Labor government in 2015. This code would aim to address misconduct and cost blowouts on Big Build infrastructure projects which have exceeded $38 billion, including the North East Link and West Gate Tunnel. A new regulatory body, Construction Enforcement Victoria, would oversee compliance with the code, ensuring standards are met in areas like dispute resolution and the prevention of sham contracting. In July 2024, following allegations of corruption and criminal activity by the CFMEU, Pesutto called for a Royal Commission to investigate potential misconduct by the CFMEU on government projects. The proposed inquiry would assess the nature and impact of CFMEU misconduct, evaluate current prevention systems, and examine procurement practices.

=== Pill testing ===
In January 2024, following an increase in overdoses at music festivals, Pesutto argued against pill testing measures, asserting "the health and safety of young Victorians needs to come first, and there are ways to promote that health and safety without the risks that surround pill testing".

=== Youth crime ===
Pesutto is opposed to legislation seeking to increase the age of criminal responsibility from 10 to 14 years old, citing concerns over potential escalation in youth crime rates.

=== Taxation ===
In May 2023, Pesutto announced plans to reform Victoria’s tax system, including a review if elected to government in 2026. A review would look at different aspects of the state's tax framework, including stamp duty, land tax, payroll tax and insurance levies. Pesutto has criticised the state Labor government, stating that Victoria has the highest rate of taxation of any jurisdiction in Australia.

== Personal life ==
A resident of Hawthorn for over 25 years, Pesutto is married to Betty, and has three daughters. He has been married to Betty for over 20 years.

He has described himself as being "from the Greek parts of Italy".

== See also ==
- Shadow ministry of John Pesutto

Victorian Legislative Assembly
| Preceded by Ted Baillieu | Member for Hawthorn; 2014–2018 | Succeeded by John Kennedy |
| Preceded by John Kennedy | Member for Hawthorn; 2022–present | Incumbent |
Political offices
| Preceded by Matthew Guy | Leader of the Opposition of Victoria; 2022–2024 | Succeeded by Brad Battin |
Party political offices
| Preceded by Matthew Guy | Leader of the Liberal Party in Victoria; 2022–2024 | Succeeded by Brad Battin |
