= Matthew Guy =

Australian politician

The Honourable Matthew Guy MP
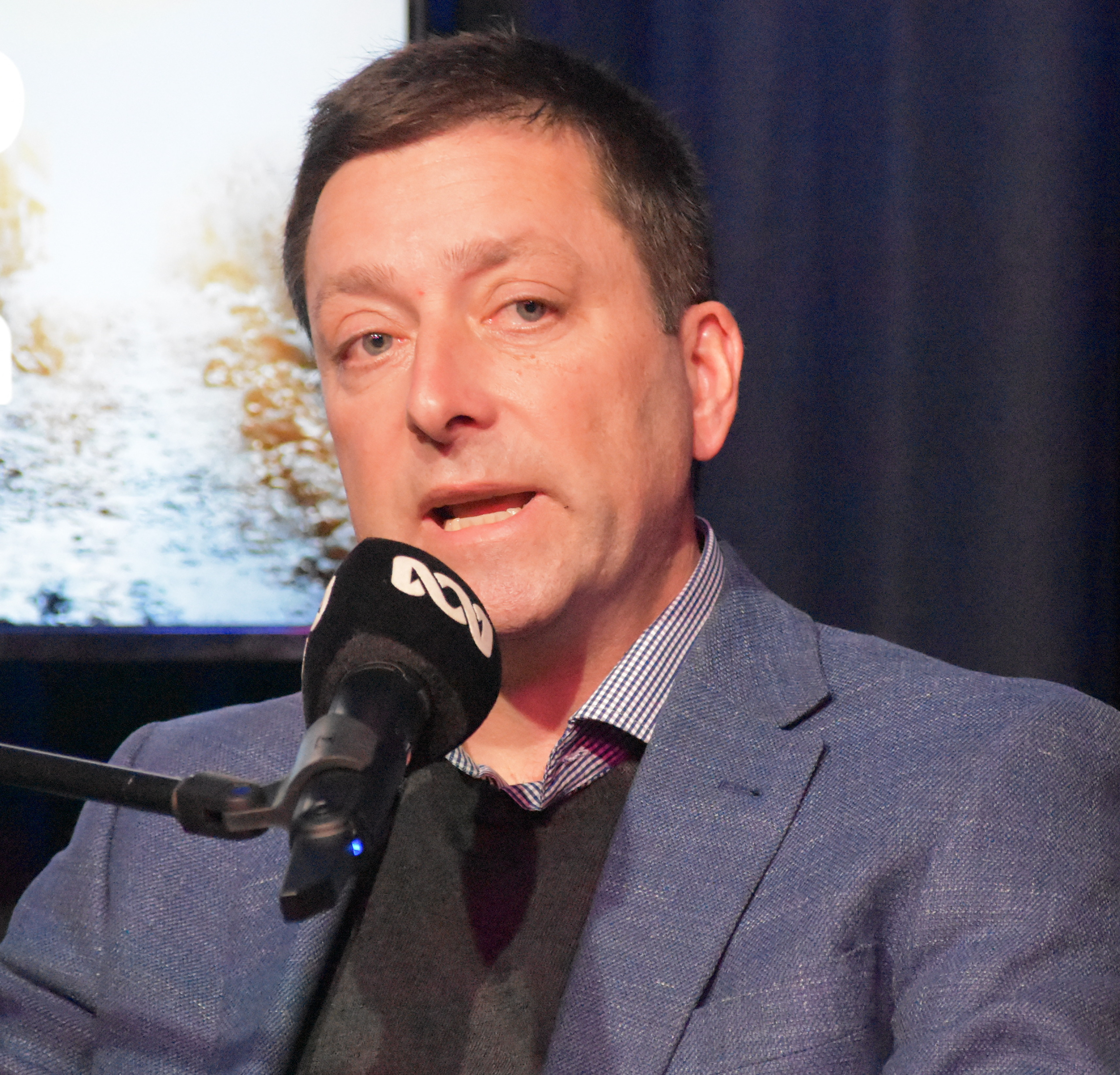
- Guy in 2025

Leader of the Opposition in Victoria
- In office 7 September 2021 – 8 December 2022
- Premier: Daniel Andrews
- Deputy: Peter Walsh
- Preceded by: Michael O'Brien
- Succeeded by: John Pesutto
- In office 4 December 2014 – 6 December 2018
- Deputy: Peter Walsh
- Preceded by: Daniel Andrews
- Succeeded by: Michael O'Brien

Leader of the Liberal Party in Victoria
- In office 7 September 2021 – 8 December 2022
- Deputy: David Southwick
- Preceded by: Michael O'Brien
- Succeeded by: John Pesutto
- In office 4 December 2014 – 6 December 2018
- Deputy: David Hodgett
- Preceded by: Denis Napthine
- Succeeded by: Michael O'Brien

Minister for Planning
- In office 2 December 2010 – 4 December 2014
- Premier: Ted Baillieu; Denis Napthine
- Preceded by: Justin Madden
- Succeeded by: Richard Wynne

Minister for Multicultural Affairs and Citizenship
- In office 17 March 2014 – 4 December 2014
- Premier: Denis Napthine
- Preceded by: Nicholas Kotsiras
- Succeeded by: Robin Scott

Member of the Victorian Legislative Assembly for Bulleen
- Incumbent
- Assumed office 29 November 2014
- Preceded by: Nicholas Kotsiras

Member of the Victorian Legislative Council for Northern Metropolitan
- In office 25 November 2006 – 28 November 2014
- Succeeded by: Fiona Patten

Personal details
- Born: 6 March 1974 (age 52) Greensborough, Victoria
- Party: Liberal
- Spouse: Renae Guy
- Education: La Trobe University (BA)

Matthew Jason Guy (born 6 March 1974) is an Australian politician. He has been a Liberal Party member of the Parliament of Victoria since 2006, representing the Northern Metropolitan Region in the Legislative Council (2006–2014) and Bulleen in the Legislative Assembly (2014–present). He was Leader of the Opposition in Victoria and state leader of the Liberal Party from 2014 to 2018 and again from 2021 to 2022, having resigned following his respective losses in the 2018 and 2022 Victorian state elections.

== Early life ==
Guy was born on 6 March 1974 in Greensborough, Victoria. He is of Ukrainian descent on his maternal side; his mother was born in the Kharkiv region of Ukraine and arrived in Australia in 1949 with her parents as displaced persons.

Guy has a Bachelor of Arts in politics and history from La Trobe University and completed postgraduate studies in Ukrainian language and culture at Monash University. According to a 2013 Herald-Sun profile, he "speaks Ukrainian, has visited relatives in the country many times and is a proud and active member of Melbourne's Ukrainian community".

After leaving university, Guy worked as director of research in the office of Victorian premier Jeff Kennett from 1997 to 1999. He also worked briefly as media adviser to Senator Rod Kemp, before returning to state politics as chief of staff to opposition leader Denis Napthine from 1999 to 2002. In 2003, Guy joined the Victorian Farmers Federation as marketing and communications manager. He moved to the Australian Securities and Investments Commission (ASIC) in 2004 as government relations manager.

== Political career ==
Guy joined the Liberal Party in 1990. He was the Liberal candidate for Yan Yean in the 2002 Victorian state election but was not elected. At the 2006 Victorian state election he succeeded as the top candidate on the Liberal ticket for the Northern Metropolitan Region in the Victorian Upper House, after which he was soon appointed as Shadow Minister for Planning. Prior to the Brumby government's abortion law reform bill passing the parliament, Guy stated that it would be a sad day if the bill became law which he voted against.

=== Minister for Planning (2010–2014) ===
Guy was re-elected at the 2010 Victorian state election and was subsequently appointed Minister for Planning.

==== Ventnor land rezoning ====
In September 2011, Guy overruled Bass Coast Shire and rezoned a 5.7-hectare farming property at Ventnor, Phillip Island, from farmland into the township making it available for development. The rezoning decision was unpopular, with one hundred submissions calling for the town boundaries to be retained, while only one submission from the developers supported the rezoning. Opposition to the rezoning included American singer Miley Cyrus, who tweeted to her 2.5 million followers that "Phillip Island is such a magical place, it would be a shame to see it change".

Days later, Guy reversed his decision, advising the Bass Coast mayor, Veronica Dowman, that he had changed his mind. It is believed that Guy succumbed to backroom pressure from Liberal heavy-weights (including local federal Liberal MP Greg Hunt, Victorian Premier Ted Baillieu and his deputy, Louise Asher) when he back-flipped on his original decision to rezone the land. The developer behind the rezoning, Ms Carley Nicholls, claims to have received a favourable hearing from Matthew Guy when she briefed him on the scheme at a "kitchen table meeting" in her home months before he controversially approved it. Nicholls purchased the property based on the rezoning decision and subsequently sought to sue Guy and have his original rezoning decision reinstated. In defence, Guy stated in court documents that he acted in error in rezoning the land but had relied on the advice of ministerial staff. He says he overturned his decision after learning that the Bass Coast Shire Council opposed the extension of town boundaries at Ventnor. Guy denied discussing the Ventnor project with Ms Nicholls or even knowing of her interest in the property.

Legal proceedings terminated in August 2013 with a multimillion-dollar out-of-court settlement, with taxpayers footing the bill. In October 2013, the Victorian ombudsman George Brouwer decided to launch an investigation to address Guy's decision to rezone the Ventnor site, against the original advice of his department, the department's lawyers, the local Bass Coast shire and an independent planning panel. The settlement cost Victorian taxpayers $2.5 million plus costs, for a total of more than $3.5 million, documents reveal. Senior lawyers had told the government that it should have paid a maximum of $250,000 plus legal costs. Confidential Government documents show Guy ordered the multimillion-dollar payment despite repeated legal advice from a number of senior lawyers that the government had a strong case, and there was little or no grounds for a damages claim against it. "This may be winnable @ law but this is a political fight and it is unwinnable," Guy is quoted as saying in confidential notes made by the Victorian Government Solicitor's Office in July 2013.

In early 2014, Guy overruled his department to block the release of freedom of information documents about the botched rezoning of farmland on Phillip Island. In March 2014, Mr Brouwer found that Guy was ultimately responsible for the rezoning decision and that he had refused to hand over important documents requested as part of his investigation. However, Mr Brouwer also found that Guy was unaware that his advisers were acting in his name when asking for the planning department to change its advice.

==== High-rise building approvals ====
During his tenure as planning minister, Matthew Guy became known for approving a large number of high rise buildings apartment towers in the CBD and Southbank, and for rezoning swaths of land at Fishermans Bend, Footscray and North Melbourne for high-rise development. Developments over 25,000 square metres in total developed area within the CBD and Southbank had long been the responsibility of the Minister for Planning rather than the City of Melbourne, and with the growth of larger apartment developments in the central city in the early 21st century, more and more towers fell into this category. In early 2010 the then Labor Government set up the Central City Standing Planning Committee, with representative from Council and State Government, to advise on these applications, but in December 2010 it was disbanded by the new Coalition Government and not replaced despite it being Coalition policy.

By March 2013, Guy had issued approvals for numerous tower projects in central Melbourne, while rejecting only one. The one project Guy did not approve and instead intervened to stop was an 88-metre apartment tower at 35 Albert Road, where he imposed height controls. Doing so protected the views to the bay enjoyed by some of Melbourne's richest business people, including active Liberal Party supporters, MP Andrea Coote and former federal deputy Liberal leader Peter Reith, from a nearby tower.

In March 2013, Guy announced that he had approved plans for the tallest tower in the southern hemisphere – Australia 108 – with a height of 388 metres, 90 metres higher than Eureka Tower. This approval drew criticism from the Melbourne Lord Mayor Robert Doyle, who was concerned the building would cast a shadow over the Shrine of Remembrance, and from planning academic Professor Michael Buxton, who referred to Guy as "Mr Skyscraper."

In February 2014 Guy approved five large apartment developments on what he dubbed as "Super Tuesday". They included a 'pencil thin' 55 storey tower at 464 Collins Street, a 63-storey, 632-unit tower on A'Beckett Street near Elizabeth Street, and a 55-storey tower of 466 apartments at 398 Elizabeth Street.

In June 2014, Australia 108 was approved for a second time with a height reduction after Fairfax Media revealed the building violated federal air safety regulations for Essendon Airport.

At the same time Guy approved a 75-level tower at 452 Elizabeth Street, and a 54-storey building at 84–90 Queensbridge Street, with reasons he gave being that with Australia 108 they would provide homes for 4000 people, and "Building more apartments in the city takes population pressure off quieter suburban areas,". Opposition planning spokesman Brian Tee said the minister, by approving so many skyscrapers so quickly for Melbourne's CBD, was displaying "a complete disregard for the impact these developments are going to have" over a 15- or 20-year period.

==== Wind farm laws ====
Before the 2010 state election, the then Liberal–National opposition announced plans to restrict wind farm developments across Victoria, within two kilometres of homes and in the vicinity of regional towns. On 29 August 2011, Minister Guy delivered on this commitment through approval of Amendment VC82 to the Victoria Planning Provisions, prohibiting new wind turbines within two kilometres of homes unless there is written consent from the homeowner. VC82 also introduced no-go zones for wind farms in the Yarra Valley, Dandenong Ranges, Mornington Peninsula, Bellarine Peninsula, Great Ocean Road region, the Macedon and McHarg Ranges, and the Bass Coast.

The Coalition government was criticised for offering little in the way of explanation for no-go zones. The new planning laws were criticised by academics on the basis that they would: entrench fossil fuel generation in the state, make it harder for Victoria to move towards renewable energy, put local above global concerns, and treat wind as more dangerous than coal. Industry also expressed concern about impact of the wind laws on jobs and investment, as did the State opposition. Wind turbine tower manufacturer Keppel Prince threatened to move parts of the business interstate but did not. The Clean Energy Council said the change would cost hundreds of new jobs in regional areas and drive $3.6 billion of investment away from Victoria. Pacific Hydro stated that they are not looking at new greenfield developments in Victoria and Windlab Systems stated that the Government's planning laws had "gone too far" and the company was moving all staff to Canberra

The then Premier Ted Baillieu had opposed wind energy since the early 2000s, raising concerns about the approval of projects at Portland in western Victoria and the Bald Hills proposal in Gippsland. He referred to wind turbines as "towering triffids" and referred to then Premier Bracks as a "coastal vandal" and as someone who avoided visiting the Toora wind farm out of fear of being "lynched".

On 6 March 2013 Denis Napthine became Premier of Victoria. His electorate is home to the largest wind farm in the southern hemisphere and also hosts wind turbine tower manufacturer Keppel Prince. Napthine indicated there would be no change to Guy's wind energy planning laws, despite the economic benefits to the Premier's electorate and his personal admiration of wind turbines. Bloomberg New Energy Finance has stated that the wind laws "could push up the price of electricity for consumers by around $2 billion. This is because the Victorian laws essentially will make it harder and more expensive to build renewable energy."

In July 2014, Guy announced a small adjustment to the planning laws allowing existing wind farm permits to be amended, which may assist with upgrading turbine technology.

=== Opposition leader (2014–2018) ===
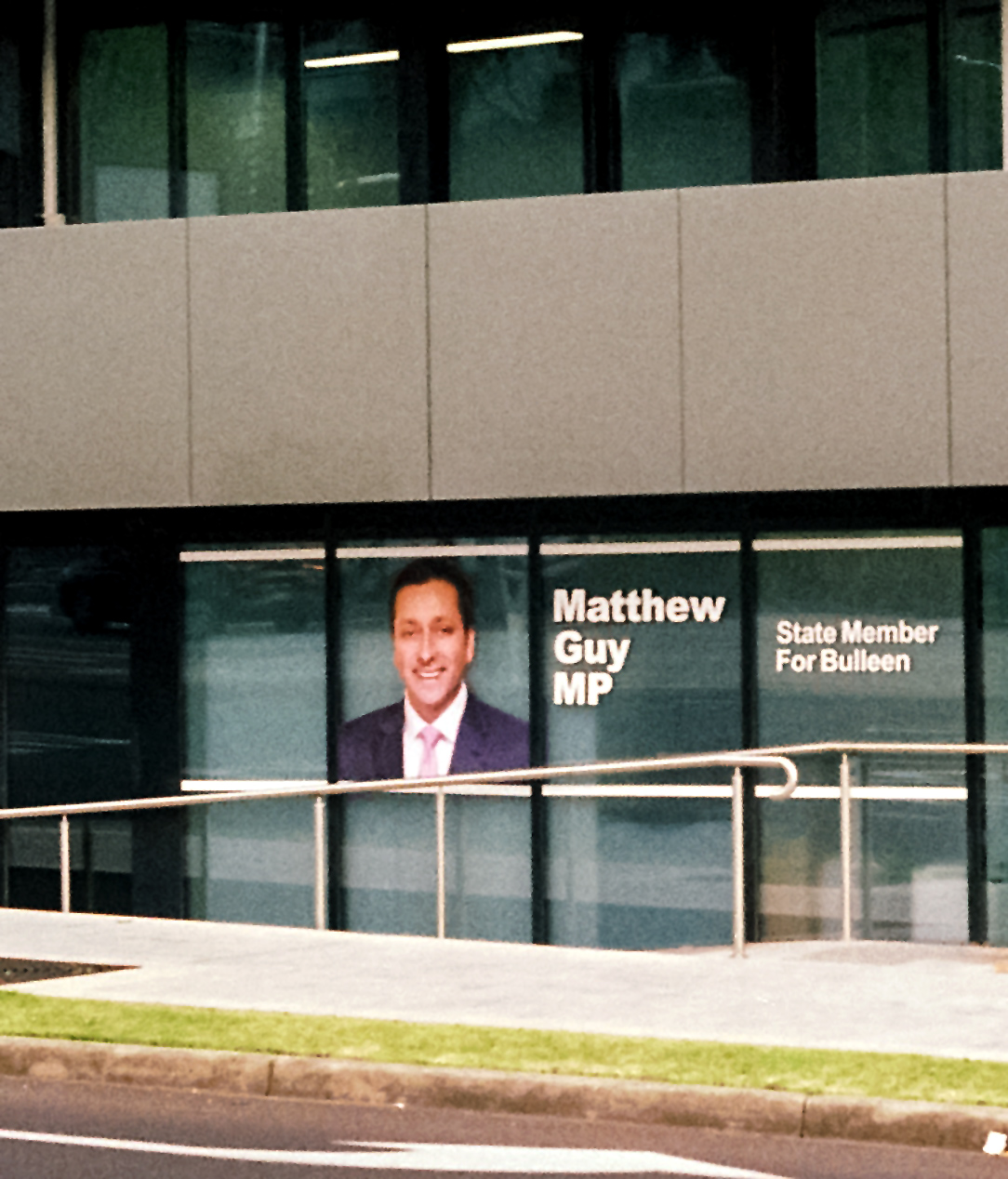
Guy's electoral office in Doncaster

In 2014, Guy successfully contested the Legislative Assembly seat of Bulleen, although the Liberal–National coalition was defeated at the same election after just a single term in government. Former Premier Denis Napthine stood down as Liberal leader following the election loss.

Guy was elected as leader of the Liberal Party in a leadership ballot contested on 4 December 2014, making him Leader of the Opposition after defeating Michael O'Brien for the position.

==== Comparing jails to South Africa ====
In January 2017, following a riot in which several juvenile inmates escaped from a correctional facility, Guy criticised the state government by remarking several times that "This is a government who is standing by and allowing Melbourne to become the Johannesburg of the South Pacific." These comments attracted attention from the governing party of South Africa, the African National Congress, which released a statement describing Guy's comments as "unfortunate". The statement also said "These comments are regrettable, and feed into lazy stereotypes of African cities as crime havens. They serve to tarnish the reputation of the City of Johannesburg – known widely as the gateway to Africa; and regularly cited amongst several indices as a world-class city". After the Australian High Commission in South Africa distanced itself from Guy's comments, he responded by stating "I am more interested in solving Victoria's crime wave than responding to press releases from South Africa's left wing ANC political party".

==== "Lobster with a Mobster" ====
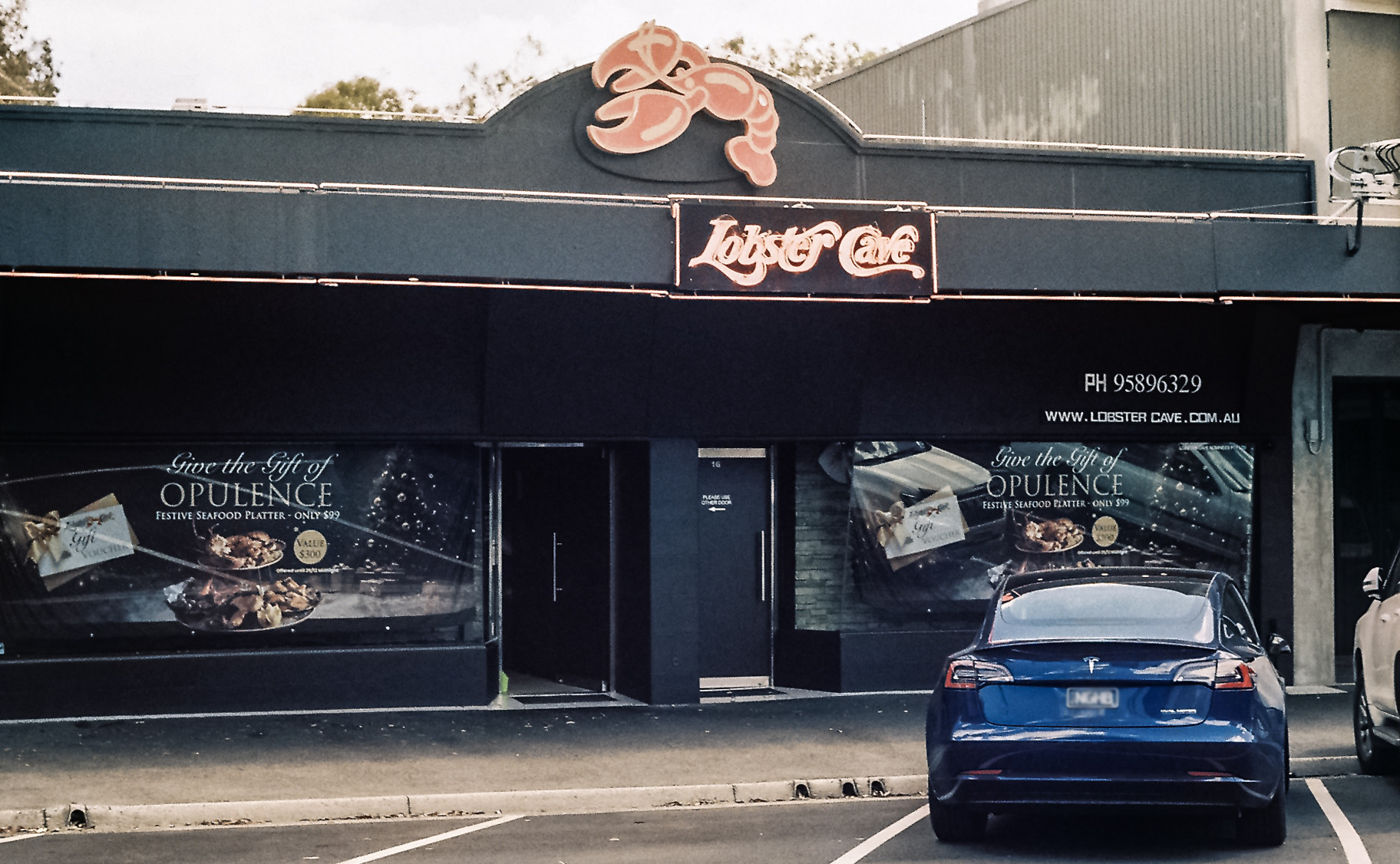
Lobster Cave Beaumaris which closed down in 2025 https://www.nine.com.au/australia-news/lobster-cave-closes-doors-after-38-years-20251007-p5zhlt.html

Matthew Guy and Tony Madafferi first crossed paths in 2013 when Guy, the then Planning Minister in the Liberal Party government, was a special guest at a fund-raising event in Docklands at a venue Madafferi co-owned. Guy claimed to have had no knowledge Madafferi was at or hosting the event. Senior Labor politician Luke Donnellan accused the Liberals in the Victorian parliament of taking "blood money… stained with misery and crime". In August 2017, media outlets reported that Guy attended a dinner with Tony Madafferi at Lobster Cave restaurant situated at Beaumaris concourse, owner of the La Porchetta pizza chain, who has been accused in court by police of being a high-ranking member of Melbourne's Calabrian Mafia. Guy's office confirmed his attendance, but denied the meeting was secret or that Guy was aware of Madafferi's presence until he arrived, although secretly recorded phone conversations appeared to contradict these statements. According to the recordings and other sources, the meeting was allegedly organised to be for the purpose of raising funds for Guy in his role as Leader of the Opposition. A day later, Guy referred himself to the Independent Broad-based Anti-corruption Commission (IBAC), saying he was confident he would be cleared of any wrongdoing, but IBAC said it did not have the power to investigate. Guy's claim that those who attended the dinner had not given donations was contradicted by one of the dinner's guests, Frank Lamattina, while attending an event for then member for Hastings Neale Burgess.

==== Good Friday pairing incident ====
On 29 March 2018, the day before Good Friday, the Legislative Council debated the Andrews government's Fire Services Bill which would see the merger of Victoria's metropolitan and regional firefighting services into a single body, and grant presumptive rights for cancer compensation to firefighters. As the debate went on, Liberal MLCs Craig Ondarchie and Bernie Finn requested leave for religious reasons due to Good Friday observance, and were each granted a pair. When the bill was put to the vote, Ondarchie and Finn returned to the chamber and voted against it, defeating it 19 votes to 18. On 3 April, Guy defended this apparent breach of parliamentary convention, saying the "means were absolutely justified", that he had ordered their return, and was proud that their actions had “saved the Country Fire Authority (CFA)”.

==== State election loss ====
Guy led the party to the November 2018 state election. The Liberal/National Coalition suffered large swings against it and lost several seats in Eastern Melbourne to the Labor Party. Guy's campaign focused chiefly on curbing what he claimed was high crime rates in parts of Melbourne as well as seeking to shift population growth in Melbourne to regional Victoria. The Coalition lost a net 11-seats, only winning 27 seats. Guy resigned as leader of the Liberal Party on 28 November 2018, and was replaced by Michael O'Brien.

=== Opposition leader (2021–2022) ===
On 6 September 2021, Guy resigned from O'Brien's shadow cabinet ahead of a possible leadership challenge. The following day, Guy replaced O'Brien as party leader in a leadership spill and became party leader and Leader of the Opposition for the second time.

In February 2022, Guy, along with Peter Walsh, David Davis, Gary Blackwood and Melina Bath, were fined $100 each for breaching face mask rules, after the Coalition MPs were photographed maskless while attending an event in Parliament House. Guy oversaw Bernie Finn being expelled from the Liberal party. On 13 September 2022, during a Victorian parliamentary session for offering of condolences following the death of Queen Elizabeth II, Guy mistakenly referred to King Arthur as one of the historical monarchs of the United Kingdom, rather than King Alfred. Guy's office suggested that he “misspoke/misread” and Hansard was amended to read "King Alfred", per the editorial policy.

Under Guy's leadership, the Coalition Opposition supported Daniel Andrews government's process of negotiating a treaty in 2022.

==== August 2022 corruption allegations and IBAC referral ====
In August 2022, Guy and his chief of staff Mitch Catlin were referred to the Victoria Independent Broad-based Anti-corruption Commission, Victoria Police and the Australian Federal Police to determine whether they had committed a crime by conspiring to engage in corrupt behaviour. Catlin unsuccessfully sought more than $100,000 in payments from billionaire Liberal donor Jonathan Munz, over and above his publicly funded salary, a potential breach of the IBAC Act as well as potentially breaching the Electoral Act that prohibits entering into a scheme to circumvent electoral donation laws. It was also revealed that the reason the payments were eventually not made was that Munz had rejected the scheme rather than it being ended by Guy. Catlin resigned shortly after the revelations. In the wake of that resignation, Guy made a short statement emphasising that "no agreement" had been made, but did not answer questions about why he had not been the one to cancel the potential deal.

Guy counter-attacked Daniel Andrews over email contact between Andrews and property developer John Woodman. Woodman was the subject of IBAC investigation, starting in 2019, into alleged payments made to City of Casey councillors. Guy said the emails were an "integrity" issue and that Andrews had to "come out and explain" them. Andrews "did not believe that any correspondence existed" between him and Woodman, but began a search of his records. On 19 August 2022 Andrews revealed a small number of emails regarding a pair of charity golf events organised by Woodman in 2017 and 2018. The events raised $400,000 for the Monash Children's Hospital and $300,000 for the Royal Women's Hospital of Melbourne.

On 16 November 2022 the Victorian Electoral Commission confirmed that they referred Guy, Catlin and Munz to IBAC after the Electoral Commission did not receive full cooperation during their investigation into the potential breaches of funding & disclosure laws.

==== 2022 Victorian state election loss ====
Guy and the Liberal Party began their election campaign on 2 November with a press conference that saw Guy unveil their "Ditch Dan" vehicle, a 1970s era ambulance emblazoned with anti-Andrews slogans and graphics. The vehicle having the "Ambulance" designation above the driver's area caused the head of the Victorian Ambulance Union, Danny Hill, to question the legality of the vehicle, as the state's Ambulance Services Act makes it an offence to use the word "ambulance" on any vehicle that is not owned or operated by an ambulance service without written authority of the Department of Health. The ambulance was used to tie into Guy's promised regarding the building of new hospitals and recruiting 40,000 new medical staff. Guy also promised to axe stamp duty for first home buyers on properties up to $1 million for 12 months.

On 8 November Guy defended his party advertising attacking Dan Andrews for being a "prick", and the use of footage from antivax protests in Melbourne where protestors urinated on the Shrine of Remembrance and attacked police.

On 10 November 2022, Guy downplayed his deputy David Southwick using two staffers employed by Southwick as actors in campaign ads without disclosing they are members of his campaign staff. When Guy was asked if the use of paid staffers in campaign ads was misleading, Guy replied by endorsing Southwick and stating that "it was not misleading" regardless of the lack of a disclaimer.

On 19 November 2022, Guy dumped Renee Heath, the first ranked candidate for the Liberal ticket in the Eastern Victoria Region of the upper house Victorian Legislative Council, from the party after her far-right conservative religious views, including support for Conversion therapy, were bought to light by a newspaper investigation. The decision came too late for Heath to be disendorsed by the party, and her position on the ticket made it an effective certainty that she would win a position in Parliament. Questions were raised over how much Guy and the Liberal Party knew of her views, and the accusations of Entryism made regarding Heath and her family by Liberal party member Cathrine Burnett-Wake in her final address to Parliament after Heath defeated her for pre-selection.

Guy's Liberal/National coalition lost the election to Daniel Andrews and the Labor Party on 26 November 2022, winning just 19 and 9 seats respectively, to Labor’s 56.

==== Resignation as Opposition Leader ====
The morning following the election Guy announced that he would resign as leader of the Liberal party. On 8 December 2022, following a secret ballot, he was replaced as Liberal leader by John Pesutto.

Guy has served as Victorian Shadow Minister for Public Transport since October 2023, and was appointed Shadow Minister for Transition to Government in January 2025.

==== Moira Deeming ====
Moira Deeming made an allegation that Guy assaulted her at a fundraiser in May 2026, despite CCTV footage not supporting her claim.

== Personal life ==
Guy lives in Templestowe as of 2022. He is married with three children and met his wife while he was serving as chief of staff to the then opposition leader, Denis Napthine.

Guy is a Christian, and in his maiden speech to parliament stated that he attended Scots' Church, Melbourne.

As of 2018, Guy was a member of the St Kilda Saints, the South Sydney Rabbitohs, Radio 3RRR and the National Trust of Victoria.

In 2024, it was reported in the media that Guy was member of the Freemason.

== See also ==
- Second shadow ministry of Matthew Guy

Victorian Legislative Assembly
Preceded by Nicholas Kotsiras	Member for Bulleen; 2014–present	Incumbent
Political offices
Preceded by Justin Madden	Minister for Planning; 2010–2014	Succeeded by Richard Wynne
Preceded by Daniel Andrews	Leader of the Opposition of Victoria; 2014–2018	Succeeded by Michael O'Brien
Preceded by Michael O'Brien	Leader of the Opposition of Victoria; 2021–2022	Succeeded by John Pesutto
Party political offices
Preceded by Denis Napthine	Leader of the Liberal Party in Victoria; 2014–2018	Succeeded by Michael O'Brien
Preceded by Michael O'Brien	Leader of the Liberal Party in Victoria; 2021–2022	Succeeded by John Pesutto
