= Electoral district of Berwick =

Berwick Victoria—Legislative Assembly
- Interactive map of electoral district boundaries from the 2022 state election
- State: Victoria
- Dates current: 1976–2002; 2022–present
- MP: Brad Battin
- Party: Liberal
- Namesake: Suburb of Berwick
- Electors: 51,910 (2022)
- Area: 99 km^{2} (38.2 sq mi)
- Demographic: Outer metropolitan
Electorates around Berwick:
Narre Warren North	Monbulk	Pakenham
Narre Warren South	Berwick	Pakenham
Cranbourne	Bass	Pakenham

The electoral district of Berwick is an electoral district of the Legislative Assembly in the Australian state of Victoria.

The original electoral district of Berwick was created at the 1976 state election and abolished at the 2002 election. In the 2021 redistribution, it was revived as a new electoral district to be contested at the 2022 state election. It covers areas from the abolished district of Gembrook, and covers outer eastern suburbs of Melbourne. It includes the suburbs of Beaconsfield, Berwick, Clyde North and small towns around Cardinia Creek south of Emerald.

The abolished seat of Gembrook was held by Liberal MP Brad Battin, who recontested Berwick and retained the seat at the 2022 election. Battin served as leader of the opposition in Victoria from 27 December 2024 until 18 November 2025.

== Members for Berwick ==
First incarnation (1976–2002)
Member	Party	Term
Rob Maclellan	Liberal	1976–1992
Robert Dean	Liberal	1992–2002

Second incarnation (2022–present)
Member	Party	Term
Brad Battin	Liberal	2022–present

== Election results ==
2022 Victorian state election: Berwick
Party	Candidate	Votes	%	±%
Liberal	Brad Battin	20,031	45.2	−2.6
Labor	Malik Zaveer	15,874	35.8	−6.6
Greens	Hayley Perry	4,297	9.7	+2.4
Freedom	Kerry Haupt	1,570	3.5	+3.5
Family First	Joel van der Horst	1,488	3.4	+3.4
Animal Justice	Katherine Dolheguy	1,029	2.3	+2.3
Total formal votes		44,288	95.9	+1.7
Informal votes		1,876	4.1	−1.7
Turnout		46,164	88.9	+0.2
Two-party-preferred result
Liberal	Brad Battin	24,230	54.7	+3.4
Labor	Malik Zaveer	20,058	45.3	−3.4
Liberal hold		Swing	+3.4	
