= Ted Baillieu =

Premier of Victoria from 2010 to 2013

The Honourable Ted Baillieu AO
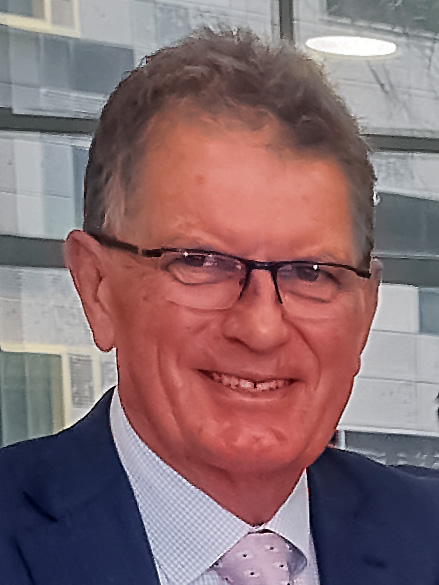
- Baillieu in 2024

46th Premier of Victoria
- In office 2 December 2010 – 6 March 2013
- Monarch: Elizabeth II
- Governor: David de Kretser; Alex Chernov
- Deputy: Peter Ryan
- Preceded by: John Brumby
- Succeeded by: Denis Napthine

Leader of the Opposition in Victoria Elections: 2006
- In office 8 May 2006 – 2 December 2010
- Premier: Steve Bracks; John Brumby
- Deputy: Louise Asher
- Preceded by: Robert Doyle
- Succeeded by: Daniel Andrews

Leader of the Liberal Party in Victoria
- In office 8 May 2006 – 6 March 2013
- Deputy: Louise Asher
- Preceded by: Robert Doyle
- Succeeded by: Denis Napthine

Member of the Victorian Parliament for Hawthorn
- In office 18 September 1999 – 29 November 2014
- Preceded by: Phil Gude
- Succeeded by: John Pesutto

Personal details
- Born: Edward Norman Baillieu; 31 July 1953 (age 73) Melbourne, Victoria, Australia
- Party: Liberal (since 1981)
- Spouse: Robyn Jubb
- Children: 3
- Education: University of Melbourne
- Profession: Architect
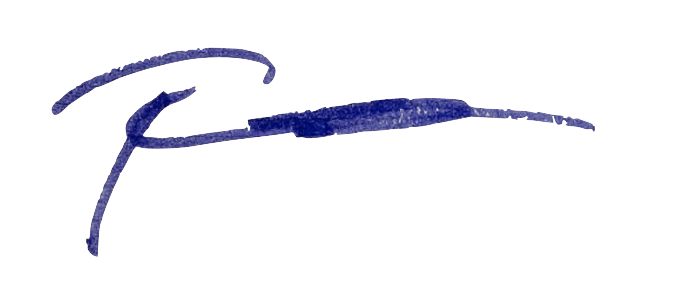
- Signature

Edward Norman Baillieu AO (born 31 July 1953) is a former Australian politician who served as the 46th premier of Victoria from 2010 to 2013 and the leader of the Victorian Liberal Party from 2006 to 2013. He was the member of the Legislative Assembly (MP) for the district of Hawthorn from 1999 to 2014.

Baillieu was elected leader of the Liberal Party in opposition in 2006, and served as Premier from 2010 until 2013 after winning the 2010 state election. He resigned as Premier on 6 March 2013, and was succeeded by Denis Napthine.

== Early life ==
Ted Baillieu is the youngest son of Darren and Diana Baillieu. He is also the younger brother of solicitor Ian Baillieu, former ABC presenter Fiona Baillieu, author David Baillieu, former journalist and Portsea activist Kate Baillieu (the widow of state Liberal politician Julian Doyle) and Olympic oarsman and America's Cup yachtsman Will Baillieu. His Walloon great-great-great-grandfather, Étienne Lambert Baillieux (1773–1816), migrated to England from Liège, Belgium. The 3rd Baron Baillieu, James William Latham Baillieu (b. 1950) is his third cousin and his great uncle is William Laurence Baillieu. He is also the great-grandson of Victorian politician William Knox. He was raised in the Melbourne suburb of Toorak and educated at Melbourne Grammar School and the University of Melbourne, where he graduated in 1976 with a Bachelor of Architecture degree. Baillieu is related to the Myer family.

== Professional career ==
He worked as an architect and for a time joined the family real estate firm Baillieu Knight Frank. The Labor Party ran an election advertisement campaign in 2006 and 2010 claiming he profited from Liberal government policies. Baillieu was also employed by Tourism Victoria from 1998 to 1999, before entering politics.

== Political career ==
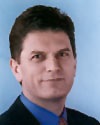
Baillieu shortly after his election to the Victorian Parliament.

He joined the Carlton branch of the Liberal Party in 1981 because of his frustration at the power of unions on building sites. By 1987 he was vice-president of the Victorian Liberal Party and President in 1994. At Jeff Kennett's insistence, Baillieu nominated for Liberal Party preselection for the safe seat of Hawthorn at the 1999 election, to replace the retiring member, former Liberal deputy leader Phil Gude. Baillieu was preselected, and won the seat at the election. It was at this election that Steve Bracks unexpectedly led the Labor Party to victory, with the support of three country independents, one a former Labor supporter and the other two conservatives.

Baillieu immediately joined the Liberal frontbench, serving as Shadow Minister for Tertiary Education and Training (1999–2001), Gaming (July 2000 – August 2002) and Planning (September 2001 – May 2006).

=== Opposition Leader of Victoria ===
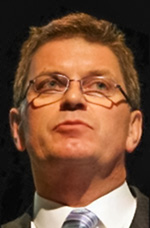
Baillieu in 2006

After Robert Doyle resigned as opposition leader on 4 May 2006, speculation mounted that former Victorian Premier Jeff Kennett would return to politics and the position of Liberal Party Leader in order to lead the party into the 2006 state election set down for 25 November 2006. However, on the morning of 5 May 2006, Baillieu not only announced he was running for the leadership, but revealed that Kennett would not return to the leadership and was supporting Baillieu. Shadow Minister for Transport Terry Mulder had earlier announced he was running, but withdrew from the race. This left Baillieu to take the leadership unopposed at a Liberal party room vote on 8 May.

Six months after assuming leadership of the Liberals, Baillieu took the party into the 2006 election. The governing Labor Party, keen to exploit Baillieu's wealth, dubbed him Ted the Toff from Toorak.

Throughout the campaign, media stories about Baillieu's extensive blue chip share portfolio, at the time estimated to be worth almost $4 million, raised questions about conflicts of interest. Baillieu's handling of the issue and his refusal to place his investments in a blind trust were both thought to have hurt the Liberal Party during the campaign. At the 25 November 2006 election, the Liberals came up well short of winning government, though they managed to take six seats off Labor's large majority.

In a speech at the State Council of the Victorian Liberal Party, Ballieu opposed the push by John Howard for nuclear reactors in Victoria.

An online campaign against Baillieu by senior Liberal Party members was uncovered and made public, with Baillieu promising to root out the disloyal elements in his party. The media suspected that forces loyal to former Federal Treasurer Peter Costello and former State Party President Michael Kroger, themselves from Melbourne, had attempted to undermine Baillieu.

In February 2008, at a joint news conference it was announced that the Victorian Nationals and Liberals would join in a new Coalition agreement forged between Baillieu and Peter Ryan. As part of the arrangement, the parties agreed to hold joint party meetings, develop joint policies, allocate five shadow cabinet positions to the Nationals, abolish three-cornered contests (unless otherwise agreed) and run joint Legislative Council tickets in the non-metropolitan Regions. The Liberals and Nationals have historically had strained relations in Victoria. They had fought the 1992 and 1996 state elections as a Coalition after having sat separately for most of the second half of the 20th century, but went their separate ways after the 1999 election.

In 2008, Baillieu voted for abortion law reform which decriminalised abortion up to twenty four weeks and the moment of birth if two doctors grant approval.

In 2009 and 2010, Melbourne saw a wave of street violence targeting international Indian students. While the incumbent Labor government was criticized for downplaying the racial element of the attacks, Baillieu broke ranks to fiercely condemn the "fear and terror" the students faced. He actively advocated for their safety and safety on public transport, which built immense trust and goodwill of Victorian Indian community.

In July 2009, Baillieu visited India and met with various politicians and prominent personalities such as Sriprakash Jaiswal, Rajeev Shukla, and Revanth Reddy, among others, during a time when there were stories in Indian media about attacks on Indian students in Australia.

During his leadership of the Liberals, Baillieu was considered to be a moderate Liberal; as opposition leader he backed voluntary assisted dying, equal rights for the LGBTQI community, gambling reforms, a plan to give condoms to prisoners, and the decriminalisation of abortion.

== Premier of Victoria ==
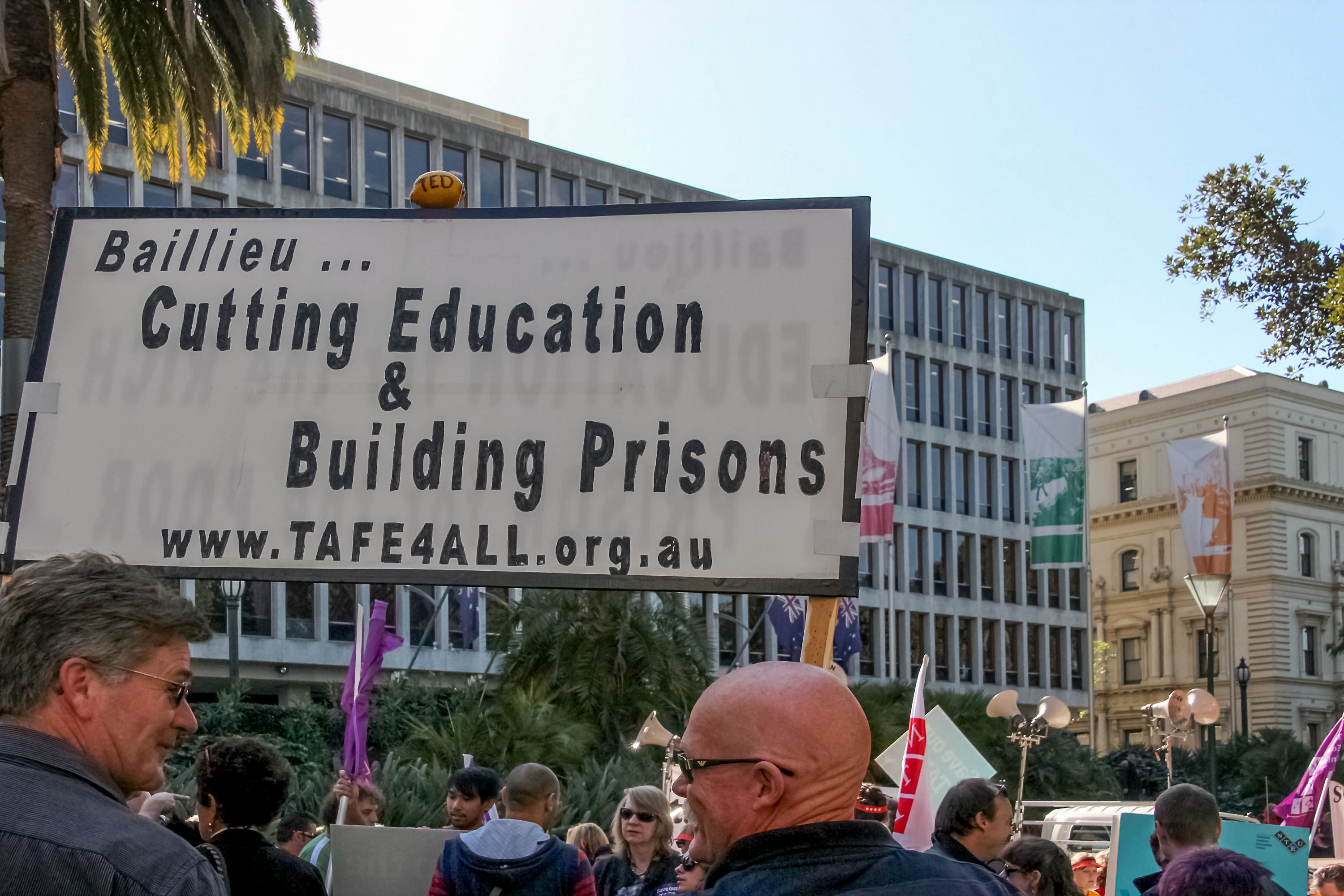
Teachers and students outside Baillieu's offices on 10 May 2012, protesting against cuts to TAFE funding.

Baillieu, as Leader of the Opposition, contested the 2010 Victorian state election as the alternative Premier of Victoria with the Leader of the Nationals, Peter Ryan, as the alternative Deputy Premier.

Baillieu focused during the election campaign mainly on the crime, safety, policies of health, law and order, government expenditure and the longevity and the ability of the incumbent Labor government to deliver on its promises. Until election eve, polling indicated Labor would win a record fourth term in government, albeit by a tight margin. The final Newspoll saw a two party preferred figure of 48.9 percent for Labor and 51.1 percent to the Liberals and Nationals.

Ultimately, the Coalition picked up a swing of 5.96 percent, larger than what it won during its landslide victory in 1992. Baillieu's multicultural ministerial advisers helped in attracting multicultural votes towards the Liberal party in marginal seats that mattered. A big majority of Victorian Indian community voted for the Liberal party.

Two days after the election, on 29 November, the Premier of Victoria, John Brumby, conceded defeat after it became clear that his government had lost its majority to the opposition. The Coalition only just managed the 13-seat swing it needed to make Baillieu premier. It won 45 seats to Labor's 43, with a parliamentary majority of just one seat after the appointment of Ken Smith as Speaker. On 2 December, Baillieu was sworn in as the 46th Premier of Victoria, along with 22 of the Baillieu/Ryan government ministers.

After two years in office, Baillieu was criticised by business and community leaders for acting too slowly and failing to present a credible policy agenda. His government was criticised for its "backward" environmental record for dismantling protection of native species, cutting support for renewable energy and introducing cattle grazing in the Alpine National Park, as well as for cutting funding for TAFE vocational education.

=== International engagement ===
==== India ====
In Feb 2011, Baillieu led what was until then Victoria's largest-ever international trade delegation to India, dubbed the "Super Trade Delegation" because of the unprecedented scale of the delegation numbers.

==== China ====
In September 2012, Baillieu led what was until then Australia's largest-ever international trade delegation to China. Because of the unprecedented scale of the delegation it was dubbed the "Super Trade Mission" and was attended by more than 400 Victorian business and 3 of Baillieu's key Ministers as his government launched a $50 million funding initiative to boost Victoria's international engagement efforts. The week long schedule covered 26 cities in China.

=== Secret recordings ===
On 4 March 2013, the Herald Sun released secret recordings which revealed Baillieu's chief of staff, Tony Nutt, had offered to help former Ryan police adviser Tristan Weston find a new job. Weston had been fired after an OPI report found he had undermined Victoria Police chief Simon Overland. The tapes also revealed Nutt had claimed the Baillieu government had hamstrung the operations of a new anti-corruption commission. More tapes were released the next day, in which deputy police chief Ken Jones expressed concerns about Overland and promised to discuss them with Ryan. On 7 March, Liberal MLA Geoff Shaw resigned from the parliamentary Liberal Party and refused to commit to supporting the government if Baillieu remained Premier. That afternoon, Ryan insisted that Baillieu would not resign. However, after a crisis meeting of Liberal MLAs later that night, Baillieu resigned as Leader of the Liberal Party and hence as Premier of Victoria. He remained in the legislature as a backbencher until his retirement at the 2014 election.

=== Covert recording controversy ===
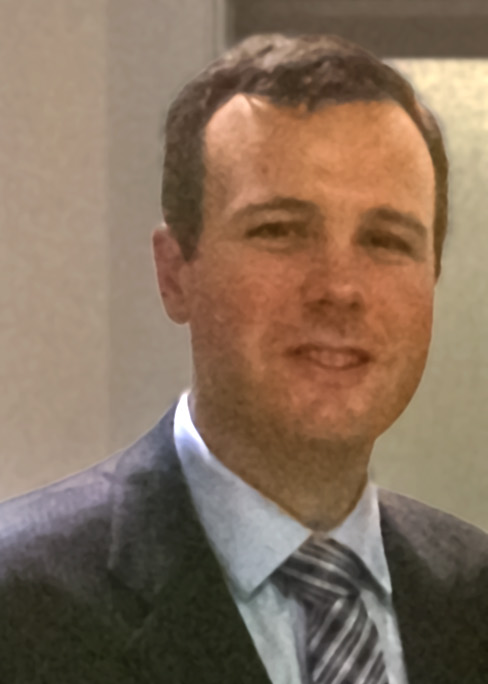
Former State Liberal MP Michael Gidley was among those Baillieu was critical of on a leaked recording.

In 2014, Baillieu made off-the-record comments "critical of parliamentary colleagues" including Murray Thompson and Michael Gidley to Sunday Age state political editor Farrah Tomazin. Tomazin recorded the comments without Baillieu's knowledge or consent. Tomazin subsequently lost her recorder at an ALP state conference. The recorder was found by security staff and handed over to Labor Party officials. The Baillieu recording was distributed from a fake email address on 24 June 2014. Party leader Daniel Andrews initially denied any Labor involvement. However, The Age's investigation of the incident led to ALP sources admitting senior figures in Andrews' team had listened to and made copies of the recording, before it was later emailed to hundreds of Liberal members and MPs. The matter was subject to a police investigation, but the Department of Public Prosecutions determined that no charges be laid.

=== Retirement from politics ===
On 22 August 2014, Baillieu announced that he would not re-contest his seat of Hawthorn and that he would be retiring from politics at the 2014 Victorian state election.

== Post-political career ==
Since April 2013, Baillieu has served as Chair of the Victorian Government's ANZAC Centenary Committee, overseeing Victoria's commemorations and facilitating connections between Victorians and the legacy of the Original ANZACs through family, institutions, geography, occupation, and place of residence.

Baillieu is the recipient of the 2013 Ashoka Medal from the Australia India Business Council Victoria in recognition of his contribution to Australia-India relations; and the Asian Leadership Network of Australia's 2014 Special Public Service Award. He also acted as an Honorary Ambassador for the Victorian Government's 80 Days of Melbourne initiative during which Victoria hosted an unprecedented number of internationally recognised sporting, arts, cultural and trade events between 9 January and 29 March 2015.

In 2016 Baillieu became Melbourne University's Honorary Enterprise Professor associated with the Faculty of Architecture, Building & Planning. In 2017 Baillieu joined the Committee of the Melbourne Cricket Club, The Australian Institute of Architects Foundation Board, and was appointed adjunct professor at Swinburne University. In 2017 he was appointed co-chair of the Victorian Government's Cladding Task Force. In July 2020, Baillieu was appointed a member of the Australia India Council.

In June 2021, Baillieu was appointed by the Australian Government as Chair of the Australian Heritage Council. Baillieu is Patron of a number of groups including Multicultural Arts Victoria, Public Record Office of Victoria, The Sovereign Hill Museums Association, Queenscliffe Historical Museum, Cancer Council Victoria: Relay for Life, Hawthorn and the Australia India Chamber of Commerce. Ballieu is also Chieftain of the Victorian Highland Pipe Band Association.

Baillieu donated to Pesutto's defence after Moira Deeming sued Pesutto. Kennett along with two former Liberals Premiers gave donations to John Pesutto's defence after Deeming issue a legal notice to him.

== Personal life ==
Ted Baillieu is married to Robyn and they have three children. One of his children, Rob Baillieu, was elected to the Boroondara City Council in 2024 as councillor for Riversdale Ward; he had previously run for election to the Boroondara City Council in 2020 and served as volunteer campaign manager for Monique Ryan in the 2022 Australian federal election.

Baillieu is a supporter of the Geelong Football Club, where he is a joint convener of We Are Geelong Supporters. Baillieu is a regular Sunday morning swimmer with the Brighton Icebergs. He regularly enters the Pier to Pub swim organised by the Lorne Surf Life Saving Club, and in 1989 he co-founded and has swum in all the Portsea Surf Life Saving Club's Pier to Perignon events, over the 4.5 km course from Sorrento Pier to Portsea Pier.

In December 2010, Baillieu underwent surgery at the Epworth Hospital to remove a kidney stone.

Baillieu is a teetotaler. He is a Fellow of the Australian Institute of Architects, and a member of the Geelong Football Club, the Melbourne Cricket Club, the Melbourne Rugby Union Football Club, the Melbourne Savage Club, the Melbourne Victory FC, the Rotary Club of Glenferrie, the Royal Melbourne Golf Club, the Sorrento Golf Club, the Hawthorn Rowing Club and Epilepsy Foundation of Victoria (as a member of the Patrons Council).

Victorian Legislative Assembly
Preceded by Phil Gude	Member for Hawthorn; 1999–2014	Succeeded by John Pesutto
Party political offices
Preceded by Robert Doyle	Leader of the Liberal Party in Victoria; 2006–2013	Succeeded by Denis Napthine
Political offices
Preceded by Robert Doyle	Leader of the Opposition of Victoria; 2006–2010	Succeeded by Daniel Andrews
Preceded by John Brumby	Premier of Victoria; 2010–2013	Succeeded by Denis Napthine
