= Wilson shadow ministry =

Shadow Ministry of Victorian Leader of the Opposition Jess Wilson

- Shadow cabinet of Victoria

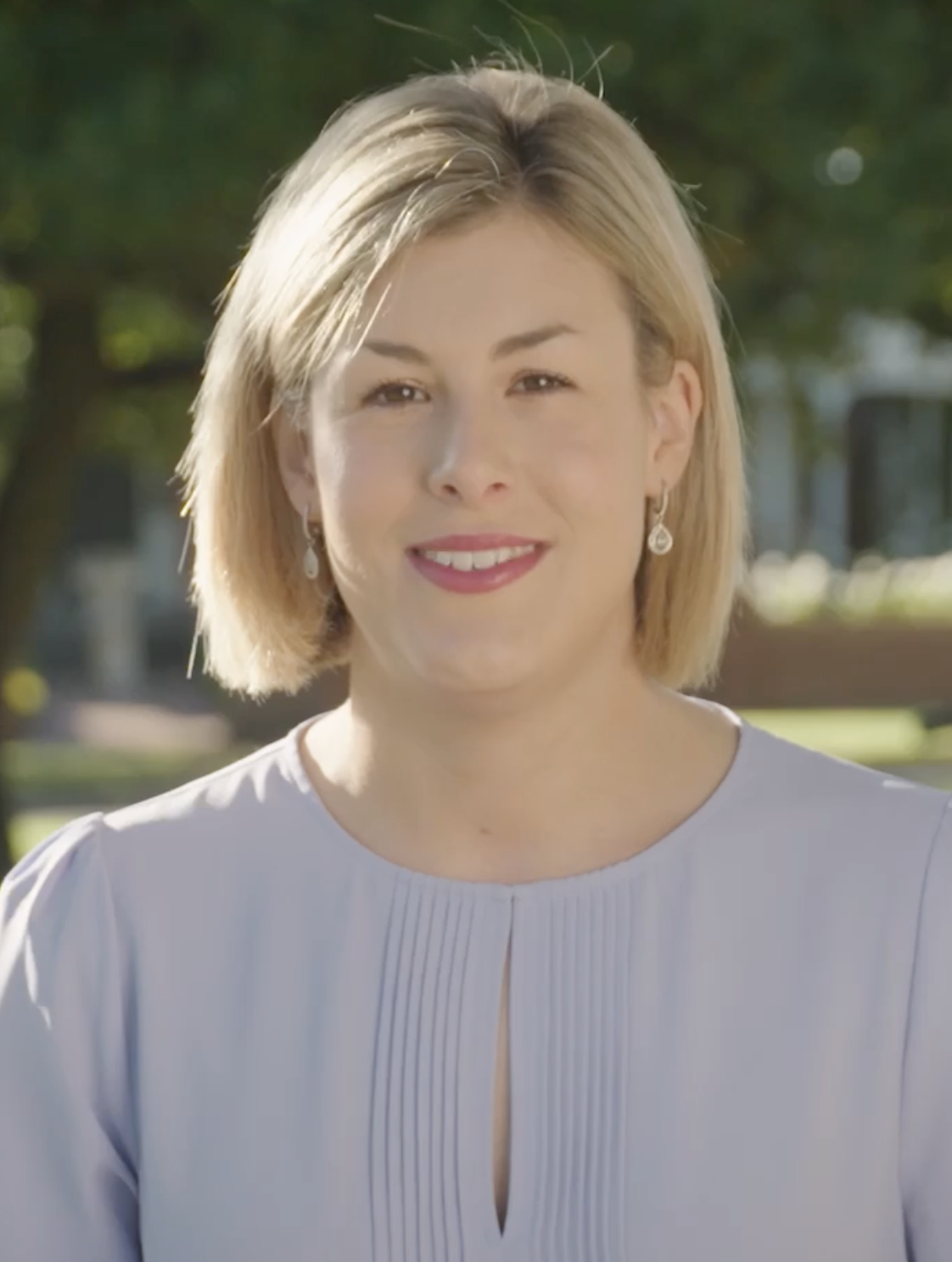
- Jess Wilson
- Date formed: 18 November 2025

People and organisations
- Opposition Leader: Jess Wilson
- Deputy Opposition Leader: Sam Groth (until 28 January 2026); David Southwick (from 28 January 2026)
- Member parties: Liberal–National coalition
- Status in legislature: Opposition

History
- Legislature term: 60th
- Predecessor: Battin shadow ministry

The shadow ministry of Jess Wilson is the shadow cabinet of Victoria since November 2025, serving in opposition to the Allan government. The shadow ministry is the Opposition's alternative to the Allan ministry. It was formed following the 2025 Victorian Liberal Party leadership spill where Jess Wilson was elected leader of the Victorian Liberal Party and Leader of the Opposition. Sam Groth, who was elected as deputy leader at the 2024 Victorian Liberal Party leadership spill, successfully recontested the position.

The full arrangement of the shadow cabinet was announced on 30 November 2025, replacing Battin's shadow ministry.

The ministry was notable for including former Liberal leaders Brad Battin, who led the party before Wilson, and Matthew Guy, while excluding John Pesutto, despite prior speculation. Furthermore, Wilson retained her shadow treasurer role, breaking with Liberal Party precedent of the deputy having the treasury portfolio.

== Current arrangement ==
The first full arrangement of the shadow ministry was announced on 30 November 2025. It saw a reshuffle in January 2026 following the resignation of Sam Groth as deputy. David Southwick would return to the position on 28 January 2026.

Joe McCracken also announced his resignation as shadow assistant minister and shadow cabinet secretary following his decision not to recontest the 2026 state election.

Colour key

(for political parties)

Liberal
National

Portrait	Shadow Minister	Portfolio	Party	Electorate
	Jess Wilson	Leader of the Opposition; Shadow Treasurer; Leader of the Victorian Liberal Party	Liberal	Kew (2022–)
	David Southwick	Deputy Leader of the Opposition (from 28 January 2026); Shadow Minister for Planning; Shadow Minister for Housing and Building; Shadow Minister for Tourism and Major Events (from 28 January 2026); Deputy Leader of the Victorian Liberal Party (from 28 January 2026)	Liberal	Caulfield (2010–)
	Bev McArthur	Leader of the Opposition in the Legislative Council; Shadow Minister for Local Government; Shadow Minister for Small Business	Liberal	MLC for Western Victoria Region (2018–)
	Evan Mulholland	Deputy Leader of the Opposition in the Legislative Council; Shadow Minister for Transport Infrastructure; Shadow Minister for Multicultural and Multifaith Affairs	Liberal	MLC for Northern Metropolitan Region (2023–)
	Danny O'Brien	Shadow Minister for Regional Development and Liveability; Shadow Minister for Emergency Services; Shadow Minister for Roads and Road Safety; Deputy Leader of the Coalition; Leader of the Nationals in Victoria	National	Gippsland South (2015–)
	Emma Kealy	Shadow Minister for Agriculture; Shadow Minister for Mental Health; Deputy Leader of the Nationals in Victoria	National	Lowan (2014–)
	Melina Bath	Shadow Minister for Public Land Management; Shadow Minister for Aboriginal Affairs; Shadow Minister for Outdoor Recreation; The Nationals Whip in the Legislative Council; Leader of the Nationals in the Legislative Council	National	MLC for Eastern Victoria Region (2015–)
	James Newbury	Manager of Opposition Business; Shadow Attorney-General; Shadow Special Minister of State; Shadow Minister for Equality	Liberal	Brighton (2018–)
	Brad Battin	Shadow Minister for Police and Corrections; Shadow Minister for Sport	Liberal	Berwick (2022–)
	Tim Bull	Shadow Minister for Disability, Ageing, Carers and Volunteers; Shadow Minister for Racing; Shadow Minister for Veterans' Affairs	National	Gippsland East (2010–)
	Georgie Crozier	Shadow Minister for Health; Shadow Minister for Ambulance Services; Shadow Minister for Medical Research	Liberal	MLC for Southern Metropolitan Region (2010–)
	David Davis	Shadow Minister for Energy and Emissions Reduction; Shadow Minister for Resources; Shadow Minister for Arts and Creative Industries	Liberal	MLC for Southern Metropolitan Region (1996–)
	Matthew Guy	Shadow Minister for Public Transport; Shadow Minister for Ports and Freight	Liberal	Bulleen (2014–)
	Renee Heath	Shadow Minister for Youth Justice; Shadow Minister for Crime Prevention and Victim Support; Shadow Minister for Bay Protection; Liberal Party Whip in the Legislative Council	Liberal	MLC for Eastern Victoria Region (2022–)
	Tim McCurdy	Shadow Minister for Water; Shadow Minister for Gaming and Liquor; Shadow Minister for Consumer Affairs	National	Ovens Valley (2014–)
	Nick McGowan	Shadow Minister for the Environment; Shadow Minister for Fire Rescue Victoria	Liberal	MLC for North-Eastern Metropolitan Region (2022–)
	Cindy McLeish	Shadow Minister for Women; Shadow Minister for the Prevention of Family Violence; Shadow Minister for WorkSafe and TAC	Liberal	Eildon (2014–)
	Brad Rowswell	Shadow Minister for Education; Shadow Minister for Industrial Relations; Shadow Minister for Government Services	Liberal	Sandringham (2018–)
	Bridget Vallence	Shadow Minister for Finance; Shadow Minister for Jobs and Skills; Shadow Minister for Trade and Investment (from 28 January 2026)	Liberal	Evelyn (2018–)
	Richard Welch	Shadow Minister for Industry; Shadow Minister for Manufacturing and Innovation; Shadow Minister for AI and Digital Economy	Liberal	MLC for North-Eastern Metropolitan Region (2024–)
	Nicole Werner	Shadow Minister for Home Ownership and Housing Affordability; Shadow Minister for Youth; Shadow Minister for Children	Liberal	Warrandyte (2023–)
Shadow Assistant Ministers
	Martin Cameron	Shadow Assistant Minister for Energy Affordability; Shadow Minister for Small Business (Regional)	National	Morwell (2022–)
	Annabelle Cleeland	Shadow Assistant Minister for Health	National	Euroa (2022–)
	Chris Crewther	Liberal Party Whip in the Legislative Assembly; From February 2026: Shadow Assistant Minister to the Shadow Treasurer; Shadow Assistant Minister for Multicultural and Multifaith Affairs; Until February 2026: Shadow Assistant Minister for Public Transport; Shadow Assistant Minister for Multicultural Affairs	Liberal	Mornington (2022–)
	Moira Deeming	Shadow Assistant Minister for Local Government	Liberal	MLC for Western Metropolitan Region (2022–)
	Wayne Farnham	From February 2026: Shadow Assistant Minister to the Leader of the Opposition (Regional); Shadow Assistant Minister for Planning; Shadow Assistant Minister for Housing and Building; Until February 2026: Shadow Assistant Minister for Building and Housing Affordability; Shadow Assistant Minister to the Leader of the Opposition	Liberal	Narracan (2023–)
	Ann-Marie Hermans	From Febaruary 2026: Shadow Assistant Minister for Community Safety; Until February 2026: Shadow Assistant Minister for Education	Liberal	MLC for South-Eastern Metropolitan Region (2022–)
	Trung Luu	From February 2026: Shadow Assistant Minister for Police and Corrections; Until February 2026: Shadow Assistant Minister for Police; Shadow Assistant Minister for Criminal Justice Reform	Liberal	MLC for Western Metropolitan Region (2022–)
	Kim O'Keeffe	Shadow Assistant Minister for Regional Multicultural Affairs	National	Shepparton (2022–)
	Rachel Westaway	From 28 January 2026: Shadow Assistant Minister to the Leader of the Opposition (Metropolitan); Shadow Assistant Minister for Tourism, Hospitality and Major Events; Shadow Assistant Minister for Melbourne; Until 28 January 2026: Shadow Assistant Minister for Hospitality; Shadow Assistant Minister for Small Business (Metropolitan)	Liberal	Prahran (2025–)
	Roma Britnell	From February 2026: Shadow Cabinet Secretary; Shadow Assistant Minister for Roads and Road Safety	Liberal	South-West Coast (2015–)

=== Former Shadow Cabinet members ===
Portrait	Shadow Minister	Portfolio	Party	Electorate
	Sam Groth	Until 28 January 2026: Deputy Leader of the Opposition; Deputy Leader of the Victorian Liberal Party; Shadow Minister for Tourism, Sport and Major Events; Shadow Minister for Trade and Investment	Liberal	Nepean (2022–)
	Joe McCracken	Until February 2026: Shadow Cabinet Secretary; Shadow Assistant Minister for Education	Liberal	MLC for Western Victoria Region (2022–)

== See also ==
- 2025 Victorian Liberal Party leadership spill
- 2024 Victorian Liberal Party leadership spill
- Allan ministry
