= O'Brien shadow ministry =

The shadow ministry of Michael O'Brien was the Coalition opposition from December 2018 to September 2021, when it opposed the Andrews government in the Parliament of Victoria. It was led by Michael O'Brien following his election as leader of the party and Victorian Leader of the Opposition on 6 December 2018. The shadow cabinet was composed of the caucuses from the Liberal Party and Nationals. O'Brien's shadow ministry had one major reshuffle in March 2021 after a failed leadership spill by Brad Battin. The cabinet dissolved after a leadership spill saw Matthew Guy assume the leadership, and arrange his own cabinet.

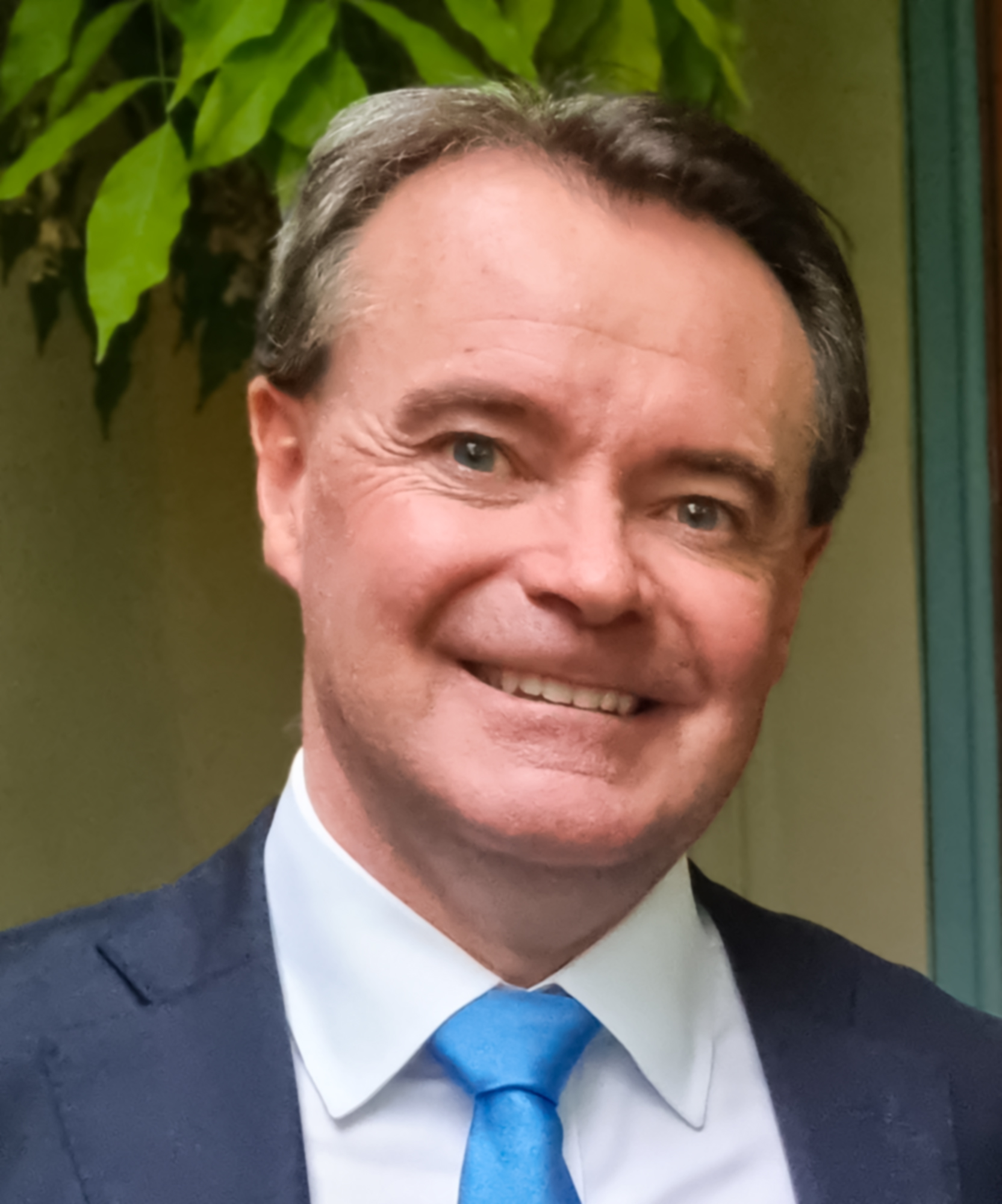
Former Opposition Leader Michael O'Brien

== Shadow cabinet ==
Colour key
(for political parties)
Liberal
National

Shadow minister	Portfolio
Michael O'Brien MP	Leader of the Opposition; Shadow Minister for Small Business
Peter Walsh MP	Deputy Leader of the Opposition; Shadow Minister for Regional Victoria; Shadow Minister for Agriculture; Shadow Minister for Aboriginal Affairs
Cindy McLeish MP	Shadow Minister for Tourism, Major Events and Sport; Shadow Minister for Regional Cities
Stephanie Ryan MP	Shadow Minister for Water; Shadow Minister for Public Transport (Regional); Shadow Minister for Gaming and Liquor Regulation
David Davis MLC	Leader of the Opposition in the Legislative Council; Shadow Minister for Public Transport (Metropolitan); Shadow Minister for Transport Infrastructure; Shadow Minister for Planning and Heritage (from 21 March 2021); Shadow Minister for Federal-State Relations; Shadow Minister for the Arts and Creative Industries
Georgie Crozier MLC	Deputy Leader of the Opposition in the Legislative Council; Shadow Minister for Health; Shadow Minister for Ambulance Services
Louise Staley MP	Shadow Treasurer; Shadow Minister for Economic Development
Neil Angus MP	Shadow Assistant Treasurer; Shadow Minister for Consumer Affairs; Shadow Minister for Citizenship and Multicultural Affairs
Roma Britnell MP	Shadow Minister for Rural Roads; Shadow Minister for Ports and Freight
Tim Bull MP	Shadow Minister for Carers and Disability; Shadow Minister for Veterans Affairs; Shadow Minister for Racing
David Hodgett MP	Shadow Minister for Education
Emma Kealy MP	Shadow Minister for Mental Health; Shadow Minister for the Prevention of Family Violence; Shadow Minister for Women
Edward O'Donohue MLC	Shadow Attorney-General
Gordon Rich-Phillips MLC	Shadow Minister for Government Services; Shadow Minister for Regulatory Reform; Shadow Minister for the Digital Economy; Shadow Minister for Aviation
Tim Smith MP	Shadow Minister for Emergency Services; Shadow Minister for Industrial Relations and Workplace Safety; Shadow Minister for Manufacturing and Industry; Shadow Minister for Resources; Shadow Minister for Roads (Metropolitan), Road Safety and the TAC
David Southwick MP	Shadow Minister for Police; Shadow Minister for Crime Prevention (from 21 March 2021); Shadow Minister for Corrections; Shadow Minister for Youth Justice (from 21 March 2021)
Bridget Vallence MP	Shadow Minister for Environment and Climate Change; Shadow Minister for Equality; Shadow Minister for Youth Affairs
Kim Wells MP	Manager of Opposition Business; Shadow Special Minister of State; Shadow Minister for Counter-Terrorism
Brad Rowswell MP	Shadow Minister for Energy and Renewables(from 21 March 2021); Shadow Minister for Innovation (from 21 March 2021); Shadow Minister for Bay Protection; Shadow Minister for Fishing and Boating (from 21 March 2021)
Matthew Guy MP	Shadow Minister for Finance; Shadow Minister for Jobs and Trade; Shadow Minister for Business Precincts
Matthew Bach MLC	Shadow Minister for Early Childhood; Shadow Minister for Higher Education, Training and Skills; Shadow Minister for Child Protection; Secretary to Shadow Cabinet (from 21 March 2021)

=== Former members of the shadow cabinet ===
Shadow minister	Portfolio
Brad Battin MP	Shadow Minister for Youth Justice (until 21 March 2021); Shadow Minister for Crime Prevention (until 21 March 2021); Shadow Minister for Victim Support (until 21 March 2021); Shadow Minister for Roads (Metropolitan) (until 21 March 2021); Shadow Minister for Road Safety and the TAC (until 21 March 2021)
Ryan Smith MP	Shadow Minister for Energy and Renewables (until 21 March 2021); Shadow Minister for Resources (until 21 March 2021); Shadow Minister for Manufacturing and Innovation (until 21 March 2021)
Nick Wakeling MP	Shadow Minister for Industrial Relations and Workplace Safety (until 21 March 2021); Shadow Minister for Child Safety (until 21 March 2021)Shadow Minister for Ageing (until 21 March 2021); Shadow Minister for Ageing (until December 2020)

== See also ==
- Second Andrews Ministry
- Opposition (Victoria)
- 2018 Victorian state election
