= Second Guy shadow ministry =

Opposition ministry of Victoria 2021

The shadow ministry of Matthew Guy was the Coalition opposition, opposing the Andrews government in the Parliament of Victoria, Australia. Matthew Guy held the position of opposition leader twice, first from 4 December 2014 until 6 December 2018, following his loss in the 2018 Victorian state election, and then again from 7 September 2021 until 8 December 2022 when he defeated his successor, Michael O'Brien in a leadership spill. The shadow cabinet was made up of the caucuses from the Liberal Party and Nationals.

The shadow ministry was replaced by the shadow ministry of John Pesutto after Pesutto succeeded Guy as Liberal Party leader in December 2022, and was preceded by the O'Brien shadow ministry.

== Arrangements ==
=== Final arrangement ===
A reshuffle of the shadow ministry was announced on 25 February 2022, with the reinstatement of former Leader of the Opposition Michael O'Brien to the frontbench. He was appointed to role of the shadow attorney-general, replacing Matthew Bach.

Colour key

(for political parties)

Liberal
National

Shadow minister	Portfolio	Image
Matthew Guy MP	Leader of the Opposition; Leader of the Liberal Party	
Peter Walsh MP	Deputy Leader of the Opposition; Leader of the Nationals; Shadow Minister for Regional Victoria; Shadow Minister for Agriculture; Shadow Minister for Aboriginal Affairs	
David Southwick MP	Deputy Leader of the Liberal Party; Shadow Minister for Jobs and Employment; Shadow Minister for the Events Industry; Shadow Minister for Business Recovery; Shadow Minister for CBD Recovery; Shadow Minister for Small Business; Shadow Minister for Business Precincts	
Steph Ryan MP	Deputy Leader of the Nationals; Shadow Minister for Water; Shadow Minister for Public Transport and Roads; Shadow Minister for Gaming and Liquor Regulation	
David Davis MLC	Shadow Treasurer; Shadow Minister for Arts and Creative Industries; Leader of the Opposition in the Legislative Council; Leader of the Liberal Party in the Legislative Council	
Georgie Crozier MLC	Shadow Minister for Health; Shadow Minister for Ambulance Services; Deputy Leader of the Opposition in the Legislative Council; Deputy Leader of the Liberal Party in the Legislative Council	
Matthew Bach MLC	Shadow Minister for Transport Infrastructure; Shadow Minister for Youth Affairs; Shadow Minister for Child Protection and Youth Justice	
Roma Britnell MP	Shadow Minister for Ports and Freight; Shadow Minister for Consumer Affairs; Secretary to Shadow Cabinet	
Brad Battin MP	Shadow Minister for Police; Shadow Minister for Emergency Services; Shadow Minister for Community Safety and Victim Support; Shadow Minister for Corrections	
Tim Bull MP	Shadow Minister for Disability, Ageing and Carers; Shadow Minister for Racing; Shadow Minister for Veterans Affairs	
David Hodgett MP	Shadow Minister for Education; Shadow Minister for Early Childhood and Children; Shadow Minister for Higher Education, Training and Skills	
Emma Kealy MP	Shadow Minister for Mental Health; Shadow Minister for the Prevention of Family Violence; Shadow Minister for Women	
Cindy McLeish MP	Shadow Assistant Treasurer; Shadow Minister for Economic Development; Shadow Minister for Regional Recovery; Shadow Minister for Government Services; Shadow Minister for Sport; Shadow Minister for Tourism	
James Newbury MP	Shadow Minister for Environment and Climate Change; Shadow Minister for Bay Protection; Shadow Special Minister of State; Shadow Minister for Equality	
Craig Ondarchie MP	Shadow Minister for Energy and Renewables; Shadow Minister for Multicultural Affairs and Citizenship; Shadow Minister for Communities Recovery	
Richard Riordan MP	Shadow Minister for Local Government; Shadow Minister for Housing; Shadow Minister for Resources	
Michael O'Brien MP	Shadow Attorney-General	
Ryan Smith MP	Shadow Minister for Finance; Shadow Minister for Planning and Heritage; Shadow Minister for Suburban Recovery	
Louise Staley MP	Shadow Minister for Government Scrutiny; Manager of Opposition Business	
Bill Tilley MP	Shadow Minister for Regional Cities (including Border Communities); Shadow Minister for Decentralisation; Shadow Minister for Fishing and Boating	
Bridget Vallence MP	Shadow Minister for Industry; Shadow Minister for Manufacturing; Shadow Minister for Innovation, Digital Economy and Medical Research	
Nick Wakeling MP	Shadow Minister for Industrial Relations and Workplace Safety; Shadow Minister for Trade	

=== Second arrangement ===
In October 2021, Tim Smith resigned from the shadow cabinet after he crashed his car while driving under the influence of alcohol. Shadow children and students minister Matthew Bach and shadow treasurer David Davis replaced Smith as shadow attorney-general and shadow finance minister respectively.

Only the portfolios held by Bach and Davis are shown below.

Colour key

(for political parties)

Liberal

Shadow Minister	Portfolio
David Davis MLC	Shadow Treasurer; Shadow Minister for Finance; Shadow Minister for the Arts and Creative Industries; Leader of the Opposition in the Legislative Council; Leader of the Liberal Party in the Legislative Council
Matthew Bach MLC	Shadow Attorney-General; Shadow Minister for Children and Students; Shadow Minister for Early Childhood; Shadow Minister for Higher Education, Training and Skills; Shadow Minister for Child Protection and Youth Justice; Shadow Minister for Youth Affairs; Secretary to Shadow Cabinet

=== First arrangement ===
Guy unveiled his shadow ministry for his second term as opposition leader on 12 September 2021.

Colour key

(for political parties)

Liberal
National

Shadow Minister	Portfolio
Matthew Guy MP	Leader of the Opposition; Leader of the Liberal Party
Peter Walsh MP	Deputy Leader of the Opposition; Leader of the Nationals; Shadow Minister for Regional Victoria; Shadow Minister for Agriculture; Shadow Minister for Aboriginal Affairs
David Southwick MP	Deputy Leader of the Liberal Party; Shadow Minister for Jobs and Employment; Shadow Minister for the Events Industry; Shadow Minister for Business Recovery; Shadow Minister for CBD Recovery; Shadow Minister for Small Business; Shadow Minister for Business Precincts
Stephanie Ryan MP	Deputy Leader of the Nationals; Shadow Minister for Water; Shadow Minister for Public Transport; Shadow Minister for Gaming and Liquor Regulation
David Davis MLC	Shadow Treasurer; Shadow Minister for the Arts and Creative Industries; Leader of the Opposition in the Legislative Council; Leader of the Liberal Party in the Legislative Council
Georgie Crozier MLC	Shadow Minister for Health; Shadow Minister for Ambulance Services; Deputy Leader of the Opposition in the Legislative Council; Deputy Leader of the Liberal Party in the Legislative Council
Matthew Bach MLC	Shadow Minister for Children and Students; Shadow Minister for Early Childhood; Shadow Minister for Higher Education, Training and Skills; Shadow Minister for Child Protection and Youth Justice; Shadow Minister for Youth Affairs; Secretary to Shadow Cabinet
Roma Britnell MP	Shadow Minister for Ports and Freight; Shadow Minister for Consumer Affairs
Brad Battin MP	Shadow Minister for Police; Shadow Minister for Emergency Services; Shadow Minister for Community Safety and Victim Support; Shadow Minister for Corrections
Tim Bull MP	Shadow Minister for Disability, Ageing and Carers; Shadow Minister for Racing; Shadow Minister for Veterans Affairs
David Hodgett MP	*Shadow Minister for Education
Emma Kealy MP	Shadow Minister for Mental Health; Shadow Minister for the Prevention of Family Violence; Shadow Minister for Women
Cindy McLeish MP	Shadow Minister for Environment and Climate Change; Shadow Minister for Sport; Shadow Minister for Tourism
James Newbury MP	Shadow Special Minister of State; Shadow Assistant Treasurer; Shadow Minister for Economic Development; Shadow Minister for Scrutiny of Government; Shadow Minister for Government Services and Public Sector Integrity; Shadow Minister for Equality; Shadow Minister for Bay Protection
Craig Ondarchie MP	Shadow Minister for Energy and Renewables; Shadow Minister for Multicultural Affairs and Citizenship; Shadow Minister for Communities Recovery
Richard Riordan MP	Shadow Minister for Local Government; Shadow Minister for Resources
Tim Smith MP	Shadow Attorney-General; Shadow Minister for Finance; Shadow Minister for COVID-19 Recovery Co-ordination
Ryan Smith MP	Shadow Minister for Planning and Heritage; Shadow Minister for Housing; Shadow Minister for Suburban Recovery
Louise Staley MP	Shadow Minister for Transport Infrastructure; Shadow Minister for Roads; Shadow Minister for Regional Recovery; Manager of Opposition Business
Bill Tilley MP	Shadow Minister for Regional Cities (including Border Communities); Shadow Minister for Decentralisation; Shadow Minister for Fishing and Boating
Bridget Vallence MP	Shadow Minister for Industry; Shadow Minister for Manufacturing; Shadow Minister for Innovation, Digital Economy and Medical Research
Nick Wakeling MP	Shadow Minister for Industrial Relations and Workplace Safety; Shadow Minister for Trade

== See also ==
- Second Andrews Ministry
- Opposition (Victoria)
- 2018 Victorian state election
- 2022 Victorian state election
