= Pesutto shadow ministry =

Shadow ministry of the Victorian opposition

The shadow ministry of John Pesutto was the shadow cabinet of Victoria from 8 December 2022 to 27 December 2024, serving in opposition to the government led by Daniel Andrews and Jacinta Allan of the Australian Labor Party. The shadow ministry was the Opposition's alternative to the Third Andrews ministry and Allan Ministry.

The shadow ministry was appointed by John Pesutto following his election as Leader of the Liberal Party and Leader of the Opposition on 8 December 2022, replacing Guy's shadow cabinet.

The first arrangement of the shadow cabinet was announced on 18 December 2022, and Ryan Smith and previous party leader Matthew Guy were not included. The second iteration of the shadow cabinet was announced on 2 October 2023 in light of Jacinta Allan's new ministry following Daniel Andrews' resignation.

The shadow cabinet was dissolved following the 2024 Victorian Liberal Party leadership spill where Pesutto's leadership was vacated and the subsequent election of Brad Battin as the new leader of the Victorian Liberal Party, after which Battin set up his own shadow cabinet.

== Second arrangement of cabinet (2 October 2023 to 27 December 2024) ==
Colour key
(for political parties)
Liberal
National

Significant changes: Matt Bach removed of all portfolios following his resignation, Matthew Guy given Shadow Minister for Public Transport.

Shadow Minister	Portfolio	Image
John Pesutto MP	Leader of the Opposition; Shadow Minister for Multicultural Affairs; Leader of the Liberal Party	
Peter Walsh MP	Shadow Minister for Local Government; Shadow Minister for Regional Development; Shadow Minister for Aboriginal Affairs; Deputy Leader of the Coalition; Leader of the Nationals	
David Southwick MP	Deputy Leader of the Opposition; Shadow Minister for Major Projects; Shadow Minister for Transport Infrastructure; Shadow Minister for Trade and Investment; Shadow Minister for Cost of Living; Deputy Leader of the Liberal Party	
Emma Kealy MP	Shadow Minister for Mental Health; Shadow Minister for Agriculture; Deputy Leader of the Nationals	
Georgie Crozier MLC	Leader of the Opposition in the Legislative Council; Shadow Minister for Health; Shadow Minister for Ambulance Services; Leader of the Liberal Party in the Legislative Council	
Evan Mulholland MLC	Deputy Leader of the Opposition in the Legislative Council; Shadow Minister for Home Ownership and Housing Affordability; Shadow Minister for Outer Suburban Growth; Deputy Leader of the Liberal Party in the Legislative Council	
Sam Groth MP	Shadow Minister for Youth (to 13 December 2024); Shadow Minister for Tourism, Sport and Events (to 13 December 2024)	
Brad Rowswell MP	Shadow Treasurer	
Jess Wilson MP	Shadow Minister for Finance; Shadow Minister for Economic Reform and Regulation; Shadow Minister for Early Childhood and Education	
Brad Battin MP	Shadow Minister for Police; Shadow Minister for Corrections; Shadow Minister for Criminal Justice Reform; Shadow Minister for Youth Justice; Shadow Minister for Crime Prevention and Victim Support	Brad Battin leader of the opposition in the state of Victoria, Australia
Roma Britnell MP	Shadow Minister for Ports and Freight; Shadow Minister for Boating and Fishing; Shadow Minister for Child Protection	
Tim Bull MP	Shadow Minister for Racing; Shadow Minister for Veterans Affairs; Shadow Minister for Disability, Ageing and Carers	
Matthew Guy MP	Shadow Minister for Public Transport	
David Hodgett MP	Shadow Special Minister of State; Shadow Minister for Employment and Industrial Relations	
Cindy McLeish MP	Shadow Minister for Women; Shadow Minister for the Prevention of Family Violence; Shadow Minister for Small Business; Shadow Minister for WorkCover and the TAC	
Ann-Marie Hermans MLC	Shadow Cabinet Secretary	Ann-Marie Hermans in Frankston, Victoria.
James Newbury MP	Shadow Minister for Environment and Climate Change; Shadow Minister for Equality; Shadow Minister for Planning; Manager of Opposition Business	
Bridget Vallence MP	Shadow Minister for Industry; Shadow Minister for Manufacturing; Shadow Minister for Innovation; Shadow Minister for Skills and Training; Shadow Minister for Tertiary Education	
Michael O'Brien MP	Shadow Attorney-General	
Richard Riordan MP	Shadow Minister for Housing; Shadow Minister for Emergency Services	
David Davis MLC	Shadow Minister for Arts and Creative Industries; Shadow Minister for Energy, Affordability and Security; Shadow Minister for the SEC	
Tim McCurdy MP	Shadow Minister for Water; Shadow Minister for Consumer Affairs	
Danny O'Brien MP	Shadow Minister for Roads and Road Safety; Shadow Minister for Casino, Gaming and Liquor Regulation	

== First arrangement of cabinet (to 2 October 2023) ==
Colour key

(for political parties)

Liberal
National

Shadow Minister	Portfolio
John Pesutto MP	Leader of the Opposition; Shadow Minister for Multicultural Affairs; Leader of the Liberal Party
Peter Walsh MP	Shadow Minister for Local Government; Shadow Minister for Regional Development; Shadow Minister for Aboriginal Affairs; Leader of the Nationals
David Southwick MP	Deputy Leader of the Opposition; Shadow Minister for Major Projects; Shadow Minister for Transport Infrastructure; Shadow Minister for Trade and Investment; Shadow Minister for the Commonwealth Games; Deputy Leader of the Liberal Party
Emma Kealy MP	Shadow Minister for Mental Health; Shadow Minister for Agriculture; Deputy Leader of the Nationals
Georgie Crozier MLC	Shadow Minister for Health; Shadow Minister for Ambulance Services; Leader of the Opposition in the Legislative Council; Leader of the Liberal Party in the Legislative Council
Matthew Bach MLC	Shadow Minister for Education; Shadow Minister for Child Protection; Deputy Leader of the Opposition in the Legislative Council (to 31 August 2023); Deputy Leader of the Liberal Party in the Legislative Council (to 31 August 2023)
Brad Rowswell MP	Shadow Treasurer
Michael O'Brien MP	Shadow Attorney-General
David Davis MLC	Shadow Special Minister of State; Shadow Minister for Arts and Creative Industries
James Newbury MP	Shadow Minister for Environment and Climate Change; Shadow Minister for Equality; Manager of Opposition Business
Brad Battin MP	Shadow Minister for Police; Shadow Minister for Community Safety and Victim Support; Shadow Minister for Corrections; Shadow Minister for Criminal Justice Reform
Roma Britnell MP	Shadow Minister for Ports and Freight; Shadow Minister for Boating and Fishing
David Hodgett MP	Shadow Minister for Energy and Resources; Shadow Minister for Planning
Richard Riordan MP	Shadow Minister for Public Transport; Shadow Minister for Housing
Bridget Vallence MP	Shadow Minister for Industry; Shadow Minister for Manufacturing; Shadow Minister for Innovation; Shadow Minister for Skills, Training, Employment and Industrial Relations
Cindy McLeish MP	Shadow Minister for Women; Shadow Minister for the Prevention of Family Violence; Shadow Minister for Small Business
Tim Bull MP	Shadow Minister for Disability, Ageing and Carers; Shadow Minister for Racing; Shadow Minister for Veterans Affairs
Tim McCurdy MP	Shadow Minister for Water; Shadow Minister for Consumer Affairs
Danny O'Brien MP	Shadow Minister for Roads and Road Safety; Shadow Minister for Gaming and Liquor Regulation
Jess Wilson MP	Shadow Minister for Finance; Shadow Minister for Economic Reform and Regulation; Shadow Minister for Home Ownership and Housing Affordability
Sam Groth MP	Shadow Minister for Youth; Shadow Minister for Tourism, Sport and Events
Ann-Marie Hermans MLC	Shadow Minister for Emergency Services; Shadow Minister for WorkCover and the TAC; Shadow Cabinet Secretary (from 31 August 2023)
Evan Mulholland MLC	Deputy Leader of the Opposition in the Legislative Council (from 31 August 2023); Shadow Cabinet Secretary (to 31 August 2023); Deputy Leader of the Liberal Party in the Legislative Council (from 31 August 2023)
