= Shadow cabinet of Victoria =

Shadow ministry in Australia

The shadow cabinet of Victoria is the opposition's equivalent to the Cabinet of Victoria. The shadow cabinet plays a big part in delivering an effective opposition. It consists of members of parliament who are given individual responsibilities for specific policy areas. This enables the opposition to present alternative viewpoints, scrutinise bills, and contribute to the lawmaking process in their specialised portfolios. In addition, it helps prepare the opposition for government should they win the next election by giving them the opportunity to develop their policy positions.

== Current arrangement ==
The first full arrangement of the shadow ministry was announced on 30 November 2025. It saw a reshuffle in January 2026 following the resignation of Sam Groth as deputy. David Southwick would return to the position on 28 January 2026.

Joe McCracken also announced his resignation as shadow assistant minister and shadow cabinet secretary following his decision not to recontest the 2026 state election.

Colour key

(for political parties)

Liberal
National

| Portrait | Shadow Minister | Portfolio | Party | Electorate |
|---|---|---|---|---|
| | Jess Wilson | Leader of the Opposition; Shadow Treasurer; Leader of the Victorian Liberal Party | Liberal | Kew (2022–) |
| | David Southwick | Deputy Leader of the Opposition (from 28 January 2026); Shadow Minister for Planning; Shadow Minister for Housing and Building; Shadow Minister for Tourism and Major Events (from 28 January 2026); Deputy Leader of the Victorian Liberal Party (from 28 January 2026) | Liberal | Caulfield (2010–) |
| | Bev McArthur | Leader of the Opposition in the Legislative Council; Shadow Minister for Local Government; Shadow Minister for Small Business | Liberal | MLC for Western Victoria Region (2018–) |
| | Evan Mulholland | Deputy Leader of the Opposition in the Legislative Council; Shadow Minister for Transport Infrastructure; Shadow Minister for Multicultural and Multifaith Affairs | Liberal | MLC for Northern Metropolitan Region (2023–) |
| | Danny O'Brien | Shadow Minister for Regional Development and Liveability; Shadow Minister for Emergency Services; Shadow Minister for Roads and Road Safety; Deputy Leader of the Coalition; Leader of the Nationals in Victoria | National | Gippsland South (2015–) |
| | Emma Kealy | Shadow Minister for Agriculture; Shadow Minister for Mental Health; Deputy Leader of the Nationals in Victoria | National | Lowan (2014–) |
| | Melina Bath | Shadow Minister for Public Land Management; Shadowe Minister for Aboriginal Affairs; Shadow Minister for Outdoor Recreation; The Nationals Whip in the Legislative Council; Leader of the Nationals in the Legislative Council | National | MLC for Eastern Victoria Region (2015–) |
| | James Newbury | Manager of Opposition Business; Shadow Attorney-General; Shadow Special Minister of State; Shadow Minister for Equality | Liberal | Brighton (2018–) |
| | Brad Battin | Shadow Minister for Police and Corrections; Shadow Minister for Sport | Liberal | Berwick (2022–) |
| | Tim Bull | Shadow Minister for Disability, Ageing, Carers and Volunteers; Shadow Minister for Racing; Shadow Minister for Veterans' Affairs | National | Gippsland East (2010–) |
| | Georgie Crozier | Shadow Minister for Health; Shadow Minister for Ambulance Services; Shadow Minister for Medical Research | Liberal | MLC for Southern Metropolitan Region (2010–) |
| | David Davis | Shadow Minister for Energy and Emissions Reduction; Shadow Minister for Resources; Shadow Minister for Arts and Creative Industries | Liberal | MLC for Southern Metropolitan Region (1996–) |
| | Matthew Guy | Shadow Minister for Public Transport; Shadow Minister for Ports and Freight | Liberal | Bulleen (2014–) |
| | Renee Heath | Shadow Minister for Youth Justice; Shadow Minister for Crime Prevention and Victim Support; Shadow Minister for Bay Protection; Liberal Party Whip in the Legislative Council | Liberal | MLC for Eastern Victoria Region (2022–) |
| | Tim McCurdy | Shadow Minister for Water; Shadow Minister for Gaming and Liquor; Shadow Minister for Consumer Affairs | National | Ovens Valley (2014–) |
| | Nick McGowan | Shadow Minister for the Environment; Shadow Minister for Fire Rescue Victoria | Liberal | MLC for North-Eastern Metropolitan Region (2022–) |
| | Cindy McLeish | Shadow Minister for Women; Shadow Minister for the Prevention of Family Violence; Shadow Minister for WorkSafe and TAC | Liberal | Eildon (2014–) |
| | Brad Rowswell | Shadow Minister for Education; Shadow Minister for Industrial Relations; Shadow Minister for Government Services | Liberal | Sandringham (2018–) |
| | Bridget Vallence | Shadow Minister for Finance; Shadow Minister for Jobs and Skills; Shadow Minister for Trade and Investment (from 28 January 2026) | Liberal | Evelyn (2018–) |
| | Richard Welch | Shadow Minister for Industry; Shadow Minister for Manufacturing and Innovation; Shadow Minister for AI and Digital Economy | Liberal | MLC for North-Eastern Metropolitan Region (2024–) |
| | Nicole Werner | Shadow Minister for Home Ownership and Housing Affordability; Shadow Minister for Youth; Shadow Minister for Children | Liberal | Warrandyte (2023–) |
Shadow Assistant Ministers
| | Martin Cameron | Shadow Assistant Minister for Energy Affordability; Shadow Minister for Small Business (Regional) | National | Morwell (2022–) |
| | Annabelle Cleeland | Shadow Assistant Minister for Health | National | Euroa (2022–) |
| | Chris Crewther | Liberal Party Whip in the Legislative Assembly; From February 2026: Shadow Assistant Minister to the Shadow Treasurer; Shadow Assistant Minister for Multicultural and Multifaith Affairs; Until February 2026: Shadow Assistant Minister for Public Transport; Shadow Assistant Minister for Multicultural Affairs | Liberal | Mornington (2022–) |
| | Moira Deeming | Shadow Assistant Minister for Local Government | Liberal | MLC for Western Metropolitan Region (2022–) |
| | Wayne Farnham | From February 2026: Shadow Assistant Minister to the Leader of the Opposition (Regional); Shadow Assistant Minister for Planning; Shadow Assistant Minister for Housing and Building; Until February 2026: Shadow Assistant Minister for Building and Housing Affordability; Shadow Assistant Minister to the Leader of the Opposition | Liberal | Narracan (2023–) |
| | Ann-Marie Hermans | From Febaruary 2026: Shadow Assistant Minister for Community Safety; Until February 2026: Shadow Assistant Minister for Education | Liberal | MLC for South-Eastern Metropolitan Region (2022–) |
| | Trung Luu | From February 2026: Shadow Assistant Minister for Police and Corrections; Until February 2026: Shadow Assistant Minister for Police; Shadow Assistant Minister for Criminal Justice Reform | Liberal | MLC for Western Metropolitan Region (2022–) |
| | Kim O'Keeffe | Shadow Assistant Minister for Regional Multicultural Affairs | National | Shepparton (2022–) |
| | Rachel Westaway | From 28 January 2026: Shadow Assistant Minister to the Leader of the Opposition (Metropolitan); Shadow Assistant Minister for Tourism, Hospitality and Major Events; Shadow Assistant Minister for Melbourne; Until 28 January 2026: Shadow Assistant Minister for Hospitality; Shadow Assistant Minister for Small Business (Metropolitan) | Liberal | Prahran (2025–) |
| | Roma Britnell | From February 2026: Shadow Cabinet Secretary; Shadow Assistant Minister for Roads and Road Safety | Liberal | South-West Coast (2015–) |

== See also ==
- Shadow ministry of John Pesutto
