= 2024 Victorian Liberal Party leadership spill =

Australian state political party election

- 27 December 2024
- Spill motion

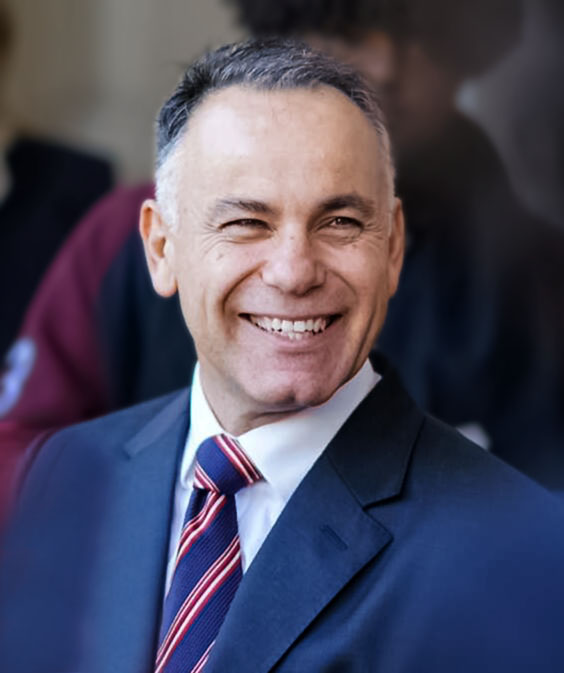
Candidate	Spill motion	John Pesutto
Caucus vote	18	10
Seat	–	Hawthorn
Faction	–	Moderate
- Leadership election
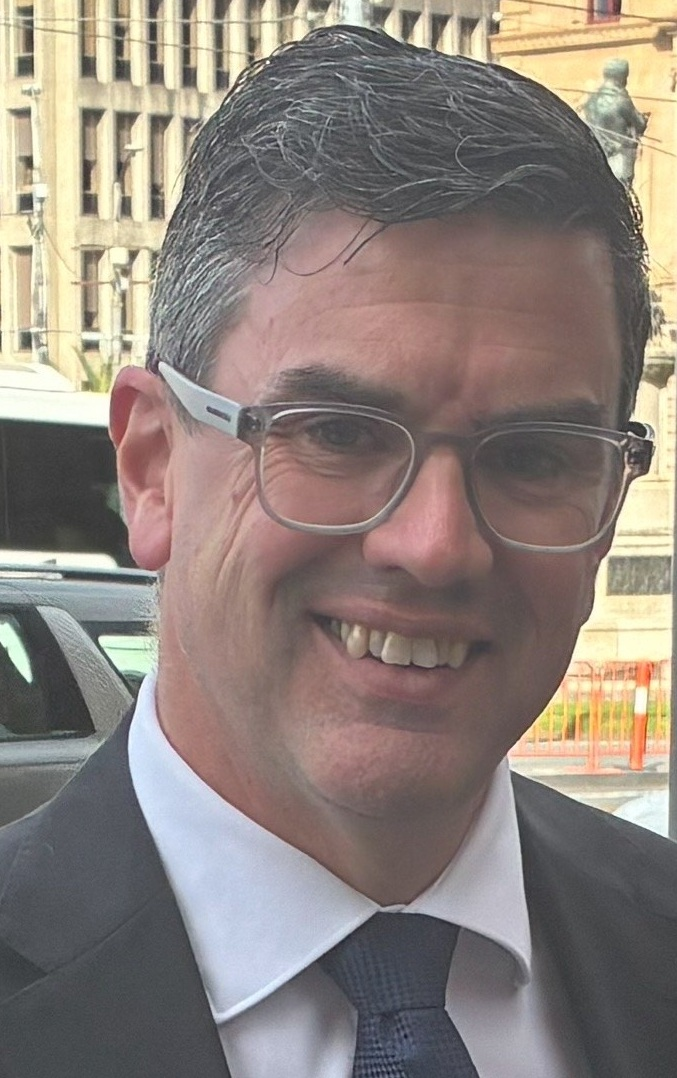

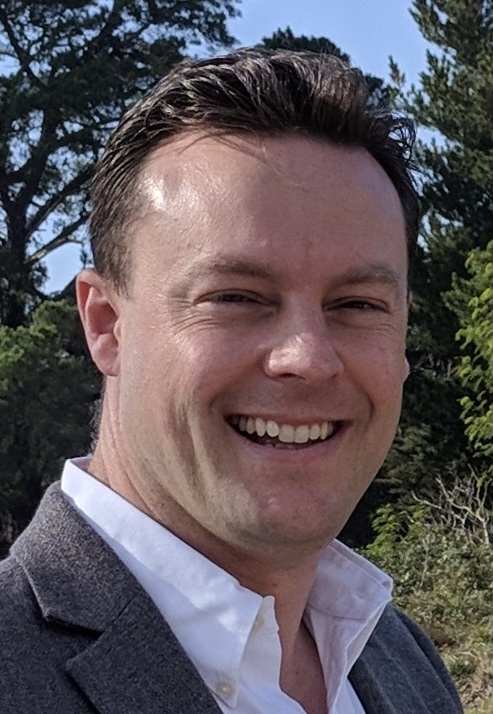

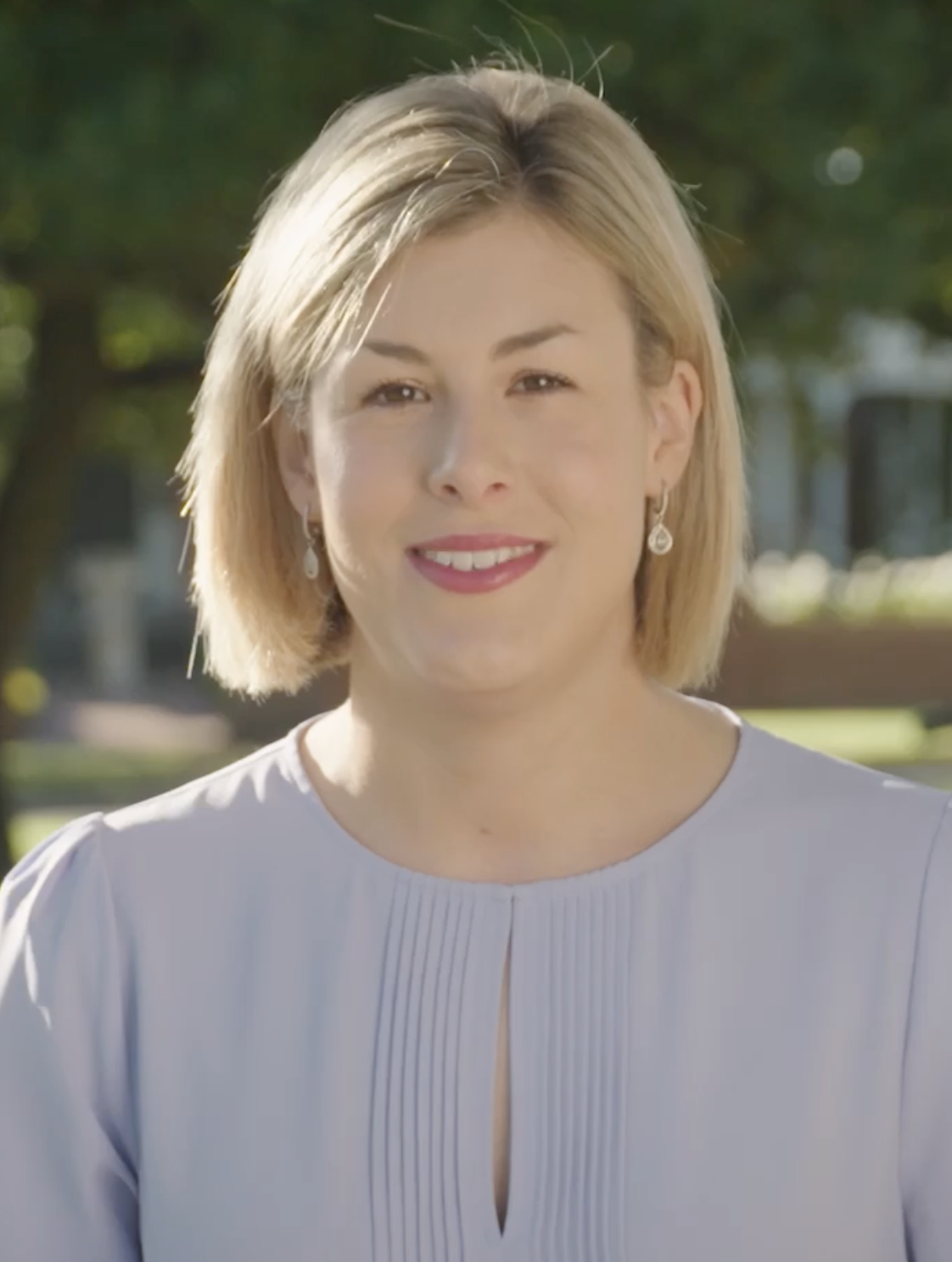
Candidate	Brad Battin	Chris Crewther	Jess Wilson
First round	25	20	11
Second round	21	7	Eliminated
Seat	Berwick	Mornington	Kew
Faction	Conservative	Conservative	Moderate
Leader before election
John Pesutto
Elected Leader
Brad Battin
- Deputy leadership election
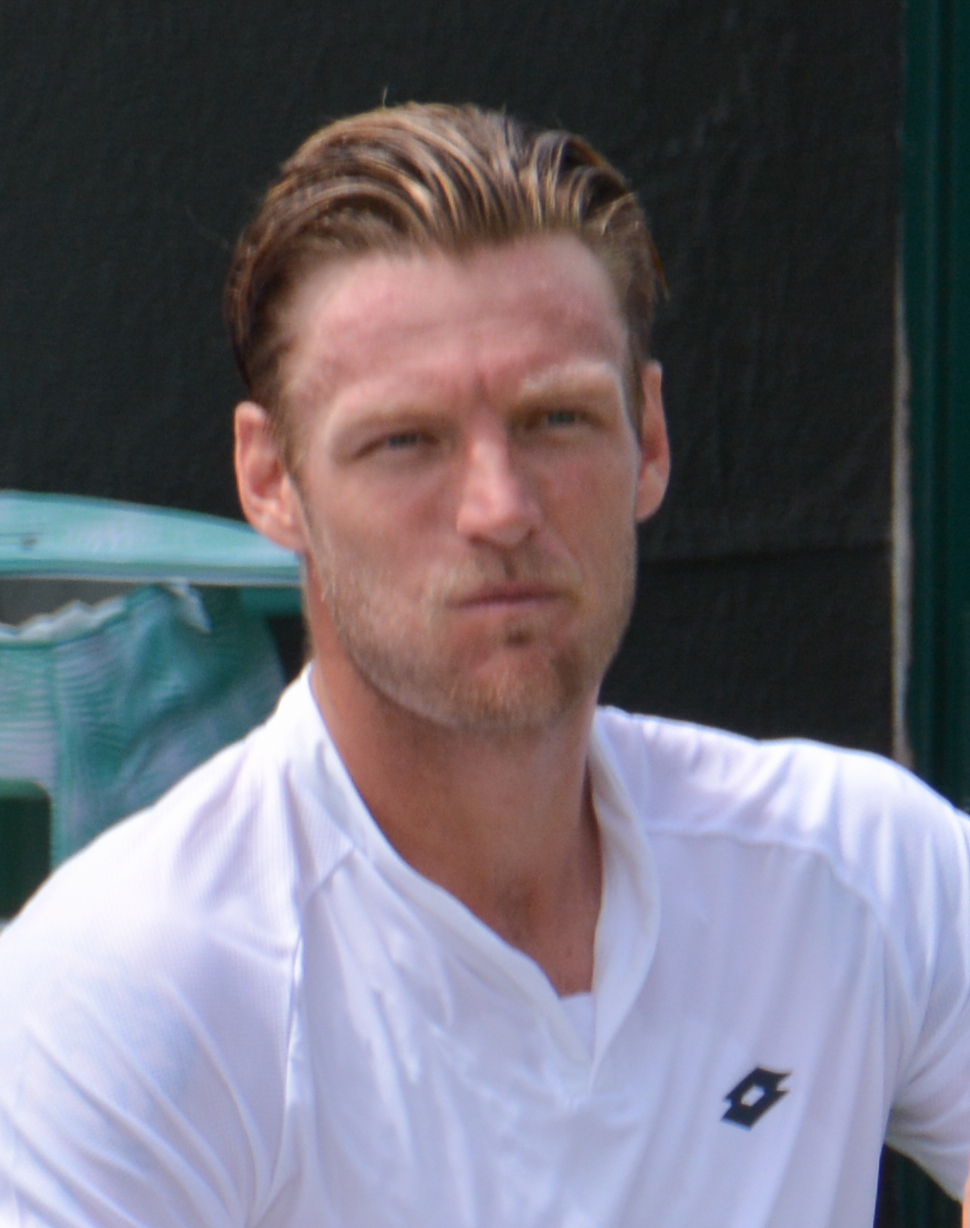
Candidate	Sam Groth
Caucus vote	Unopposed
Seat	Nepean
Faction	Unaligned (Note: Sam Groth is factionally unaligned, but has also been considered Conservative. Some sources have labelled him a Moderate, however the Geelong Advertiser and The Age reported that the only Moderate elected to a leadership position in 2024 was Evan Mulholland.)
Deputy Leader before election
David Southwick
Elected Deputy Leader
Sam Groth
- Legislative Council leadership election
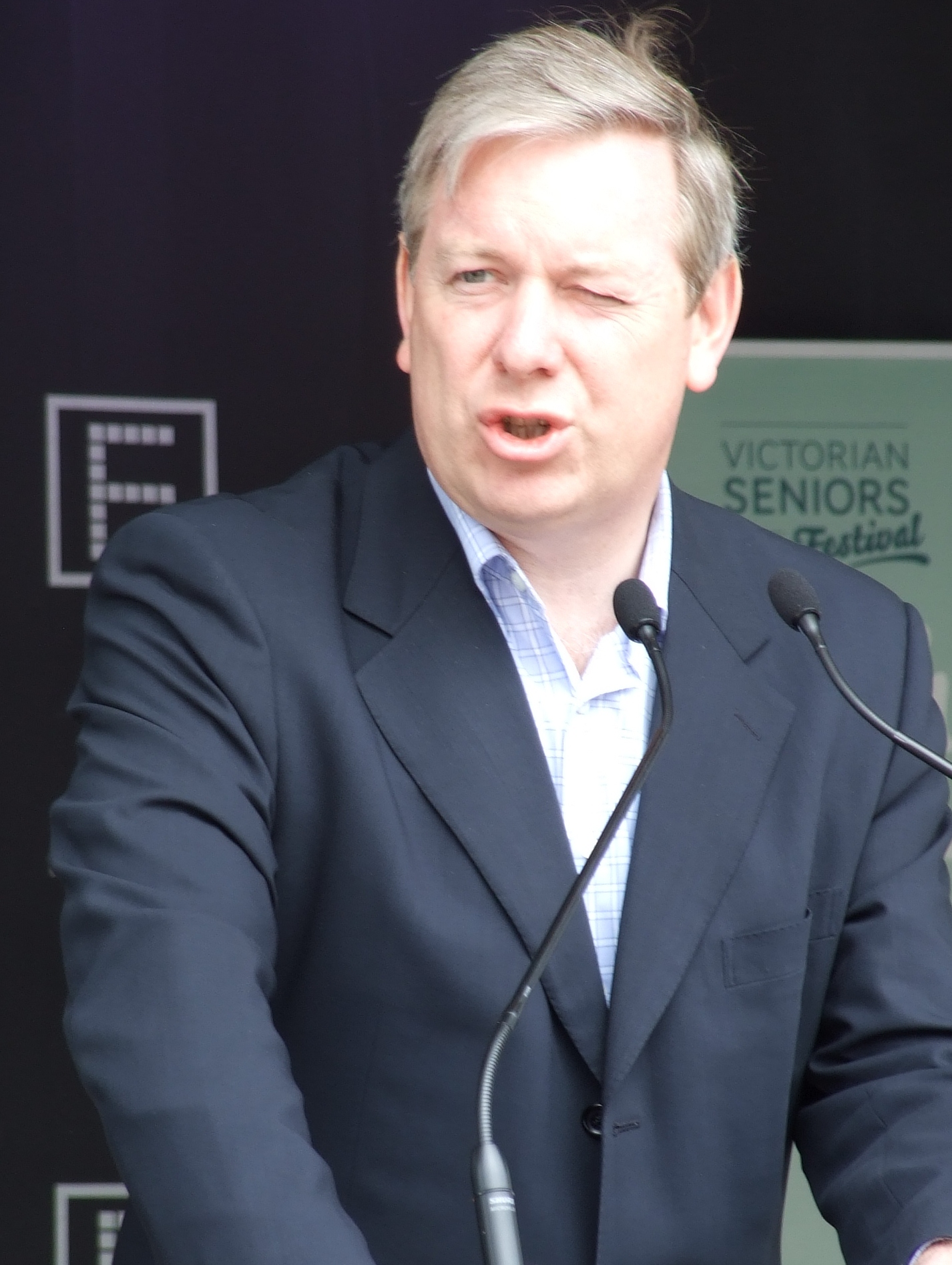
Candidate	David Davis
Caucus vote	Unopposed
Seat	Southern Metro
Faction	Conservative
Leader in Legislative Council before election
Georgie Crozier
Elected Leader in Legislative Council
David Davis
- Legislative Council deputy leadership election
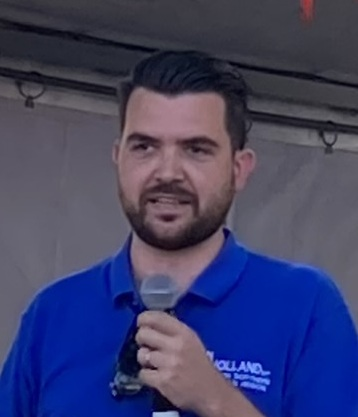

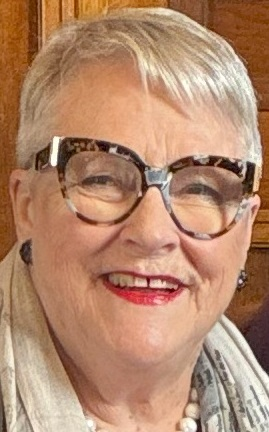
Candidate	Evan Mulholland	Bev McArthur
Caucus vote	15	13
Seat	Northern Metro	Western Victoria
Faction	Moderate	Conservative
Deputy Leader in Legislative Council before election
Evan Mulholland
Elected Deputy Leader in Legislative Council
Evan Mulholland

The 2024 Victorian Liberal Party leadership spill was held on 27 December 2024 to elect the leader of the Victorian Liberal Party and, ex officio, Leader of the Opposition. Incumbent leader John Pesutto lost a spill motion and was replaced by Brad Battin in the subsequent leadership election.

The spill occurred two weeks after the Federal Court ruled Pesutto had defamed Independent Liberal MP Moira Deeming, who was expelled from the Liberal party room in 2023 after attending an anti-trans rally that had also been attended by a neo-Nazi group.

The positions of deputy leader, leader in the Legislative Council and deputy leader in the Legislative Council were also spilled. Sam Groth was elected unopposed to the deputy leadership after David Southwick stood down, David Davis took over from Georgie Crozier as Legislative Council leader after she did not recontest, and Evan Mulholland was returned as Legislative Council deputy leader after defeating challenger Bev McArthur by two votes.

== Background ==
=== 2022 leadership election ===
Following the Liberal−National Coalition's defeat at the 2022 Victorian state election, Matthew Guy announced he would resign as Liberal leader. At a leadership election on 8 December 2022, John Pesutto − who had been elected as the member for Hawthorn at the state election − defeated Brad Battin, the member for Berwick, by 17 votes to 16.

=== Deeming expulsion and defamation case ===
Deeming in 2025

On 18 March 2023, Liberal MP Moira Deeming spoke at an anti-trans rally organised by Kellie-Jay Keen-Minshull, a British anti-trans activist. The rally was also attended by the neo-Nazi group National Socialist Network (NSN) and its leader Thomas Sewell.

In a public statement, Pesutto described Deeming's position as "untenable" due to her "involvement in organising, promoting and participating in a rally with speakers and other organisers who themselves have been publicly associated with far right-wing extremist groups including neo-Nazi activists". He then moved to expel her from the Liberal party room.

Deeming subsequently threatened to sue Pesutto for defamation over his comments. On 12 May 2023, Liberal MPs voted 19 votes to 11 to expel her from the party room. Deeming moved to the crossbench and sat as an Independent Liberal.

In December 2023, after months of attempted mediation failed, Deeming filled a civil complaint against Pesutto, saying that she had been falsely accused of being an associate of "neo-Nazi sympathisers and extremists". Pesutto denied Deeming's claims, stating that he had never called her a "neo-Nazi, white supremacist or anything similar".

=== Defamation verdict and Deeming readmission vote ===
On 12 December 2024, the Federal Court of Australia ruled that Pesutto had defamed Deeming, and he was ordered to pay her $300,000. Pesutto said he was "very disappointed" by the verdict, but would not step down as leader. One day later, Nepean MP Sam Groth resigned from the shadow ministry, saying that "in good conscience, [he could] no longer continue to serve" in his roles as Shadow Minister for Youth and Shadow Minister for Tourism, Sport and Events.

A vote was held on 20 December 2024 on a motion to readmit Deeming to the Liberal party room. The vote was tied at 14−14 (with two MPs absent) and Pesutto used his casting vote to break the tie, although he said it was technically not needed because the motion required an "absolute majority" of 16 out of 30 MPs to pass.

=== Spill announced ===
On 22 December 2024, Pesutto called a second meeting to discuss readmitting Deeming, which would be held on 15 January 2025. He said that since the meeting on 20 December, "it has become clear that there is now a definite absolute majority of my colleagues who want this issue resolved". Pesutto apologised to Deeming in his statement, and stated that there was a need for the Liberals to concentrate on the upcoming by-elections in Prahran and Werribee.

Several hours later, The Age reported that Pesutto was going to face a leadership challenge from Brad Battin on 27 December 2024. A letter calling for a special meeting was signed by Battin, Groth, James Newbury, Bridget Vallence and Richard Riordan. The meeting was expected to result in a vote on Deeming's readmission and the leadership spill.

On 24 December (Christmas Eve), Pesutto emailed Liberal MPs to inform them that he would allow members to vote remotely at the meeting, with Cindy McLeish and Nick McGowan unable to attend in-person. Newbury accused Pesutto of breaching the party's constitution in favour of his personal interests, as McLeish was known to be a supporter of Pesutto in the past. The Australian reported on 26 December that Battin had called Pesutto to inform him that he would challenge for the leadership. Kew MP Jess Wilson announced publicly on the same day that if a spill motion was successful, she would contest the leadership. According to The Guardian, Battin had earlier been asked by moderates to have Wilson as his deputy for the sake of factional balance, however Wilson did not contest the deputy leadership after realising she did not have the numbers needed to win. Mornington MP Chris Crewther revealed on 27 December, the day of the spill, that he would also contest the leadership.

== Candidates ==
=== Leader ===
==== Nominated ====
Candidate	Electorate	Faction	Announced	Portfolio(s)
Brad Battin	Berwick	Conservative	26 December 2024	Shadow Minister for Police (2021–present); Shadow Minister for Corrections (2021–present); Shadow Minister for Criminal Justice Reform (2022–present)
Chris Crewther	Mornington	Conservative	27 December 2024	Member for Mornington (2022–present); Shadow Parliamentary Secretary for Justice and Corrections (2022–present)
Jess Wilson	Kew	Moderate	26 December 2024	Shadow Minister for Finance (2022–present); Shadow Minister for Economic Reform and Regulation (2022–present); Shadow Minister for Early Childhood and Education (2023–present)

==== Withdrew ====
Candidate	Electorate	Faction	Portfolio(s)
John Pesutto	Hawthorn	Moderate	Leader of the Opposition (2022–2024)

==== Speculated ====
Candidate	Electorate	Faction	Portfolio(s)
Sam Groth	Nepean	Unaligned	Shadow Minister for Youth (2022–2024); Shadow Minister for Tourism, Sport and Events (2022–2024)
Matthew Guy	Bulleen		Shadow Minister for Public Transport (2023–present); Leader of the Opposition (2014–2018; 2021–2022)
James Newbury	Brighton	Moderate	Shadow Minister for Environment and Climate Change (2021–present); Shadow Minister for Equality (2021–present); Shadow Minister for Planning (2023–present)
Michael O'Brien	Malvern	Moderate	Shadow Attorney-General (2022–present); Leader of the Opposition (2018–2021)
Brad Rowswell	Sandringham	Conservative	Shadow Treasurer (2022–present)
Kim Wells	Rowville	Conservative	Member of the Victorian Legislative Assembly (1992–present); Treasurer of Victoria (2010–2013)

=== Deputy leader ===
==== Nominated ====
Candidate	Electorate	Faction	Announced	Portfolio(s)
Sam Groth	Nepean	Unaligned	27 December 2024	Shadow Minister for Youth (2022–2024); Shadow Minister for Tourism, Sport and Events (2022–2024)

==== Withdrew ====
Candidate	Electorate	Faction	Portfolio(s)
David Southwick	Caulfield	Moderate	Deputy Leader of the Opposition (2021–2024); Shadow Minister for Major Projects (2022–present); Shadow Minister for Transport Infrastructure (2022–present); Shadow Minister for Trade and Investment (2022–present); Shadow Minister for Cost of Living (2023–present)

==== Speculated ====
Candidate	Electorate	Faction	Portfolio(s)
Jess Wilson	Kew	Moderate	Shadow Minister for Finance (2022–present); Shadow Minister for Economic Reform and Regulation (2022–present); Shadow Minister for Early Childhood and Education (2023–present)

=== Legislative Council leader ===
==== Declared ====
Candidate	Electorate	Faction	Announced	Portfolio(s)
David Davis	Southern Metropolitan	Conservative	27 December 2024	Shadow Minister for Arts and Creative Industries (2022–present); Shadow Minister for Energy, Affordability and Security (2023–present); Shadow Minister for the SEC (2023–present); Leader of the Opposition in the Legislative Council (2008–2010; 2018–2022)

==== Withdrew ====
Candidate	Electorate	Faction	Portfolio(s)
Georgie Crozier	Southern Metropolitan	Moderate	Leader of the Opposition in the Legislative Council (2022–2024); Shadow Minister for Health (2018–present)

=== Legislative Council deputy leader ===
==== Declared ====
Candidate	Electorate	Faction	Announced	Portfolio(s)
Evan Mulholland	Northern Metropolitan	Moderate	Incumbent	Deputy Leader of the Opposition in the Legislative Council (2023–present); Shadow Minister for Home Ownership and Housing Affordability (2023–present); Shadow Minister for Outer Suburban Growth (2023–present)
Bev McArthur	Western Victoria	Conservative	27 December 2024	Member for Western Victoria Region (2018–present)

==== Speculated ====
Candidate	Electorate	Faction	Portfolio(s)
Joe McCracken	Western Victoria	Conservative	Member for Western Victoria Region (2022–present)

== Results ==
=== Spill motion ===
2024 Victorian Liberal Party leadership spill: Spill motion
Faction	Candidate	Votes	%	±%
Spill motion		18	64.3	
Moderate	John Pesutto	10	35.7	
Total votes		28	100.0	

=== Leader ===
In the first round of voting, Liberal MPs each had two votes.

2024 Victorian Liberal Party leadership spill: Leader
Faction	Candidate	Votes	%	±%
Conservative	Brad Battin	25	44.7	
Conservative	Chris Crewther	20	35.7	
Moderate	Jess Wilson	11	19.6	
Second ballot result
Conservative	Brad Battin	21	75.0	
Conservative	Chris Crewther	7	25.0	
Total votes		28	100.0	

=== Deputy leader ===
2024 Victorian Liberal Party leadership spill: Deputy leader
Faction	Candidate	Votes	%	±%
Liberal	Sam Groth	unopposed		
Total votes		28	100.0	

=== Legislative Council leader ===
2024 Victorian Liberal Party leadership spill: Legislative Council leader
Faction	Candidate	Votes	%	±%
Conservative	David Davis	unopposed		
Total votes		28	100.0	

=== Legislative Council deputy leader ===
2024 Victorian Liberal Party leadership spill: Legislative Council deputy leader
Faction	Candidate	Votes	%	±%
Moderate	Evan Mulholland	15	53.6	
Conservative	Bev McArthur	13	46.4	
Total votes		28	100.0	
