= Electoral results for the district of Eildon =

Victoria, Australia, district election results

This is a list of electoral results for the Electoral district of Eildon in Victorian state elections.

== Members for Eildon ==
Member	Party	Term
Cindy McLeish	Liberal	2014–present

== Election results ==
=== Elections in the 2020s ===
2022 Victorian state election: Eildon
Party	Candidate	Votes	%	±%
Liberal	Cindy McLeish	20,119	47.4	+0.7
Labor	Jane Judd	12,284	29.0	−7.9
Greens	Wil Mikelsons	4,753	11.2	+0.4
Family First	Tim Lacey	1,437	3.4	+3.4
Freedom	Joshua Rusic	1,426	3.4	+3.4
Animal Justice	Chloe Bond	1,340	3.2	+3.2
Ind. (Fusion)	Kammy Cordner Hunt	581	1.4	+1.4
Ind. (Aligned Australia)	Robert Thornton	459	1.1	+1.1
Total formal votes		42,399	94.8	+0.1
Informal votes		2,343	5.2	−0.1
Turnout		44,742	89.3	−1.8
Two-party-preferred result
Liberal	Cindy McLeish	24,162	57.0	+5.9
Labor	Jane Judd	18,237	43.0	−5.9
Liberal hold		Swing	+5.9	

=== Elections in the 2010s ===
2018 Victorian state election: Eildon
Party	Candidate	Votes	%	±%
Liberal	Cindy McLeish	18,717	48.35	+4.92
Labor	Sally Brennan	13,850	35.77	+7.74
Greens	Ken Deacon	4,035	10.42	−1.26
Independent	Michelle Dunscombe	2,113	5.46	+5.46
Total formal votes		38,715	94.67	−0.10
Informal votes		2,178	5.33	+0.10
Turnout		40,893	91.11	−3.03
Two-party-preferred result
Liberal	Cindy McLeish	20,296	52.44	−1.32
Labor	Sally Brennan	18,410	47.56	+1.32
Liberal hold		Swing	−1.32	

2014 Victorian state election: Eildon
Party	Candidate	Votes	%	±%
Liberal	Cindy McLeish	16,070	43.4	+12.7
Labor	Sally Brennan	10,375	28.0	−0.5
Greens	Marie Sellstrom	4,323	11.7	+0.5
National	Jim Child	2,253	6.1	−9.3
Country Alliance	Jeff Leake	1,208	3.3	−1.6
Independent	Bruce Argyle	1,172	3.2	+3.2
Family First	David Prentice	883	2.4	+0.5
Independent	Jane Judd	723	2.0	+2.0
Total formal votes		37,007	94.8	−0.1
Informal votes		2,042	5.2	+0.1
Turnout		39,049	94.1	−2.3
Two-party-preferred result
Liberal	Cindy McLeish	19,934	53.8	−3.9
Labor	Sally Brennan	17,151	46.2	+3.9
Liberal hold		Swing	−3.9	
