= Jess Wilson =

Australian politician (born 1990)

Jess Wilson MP
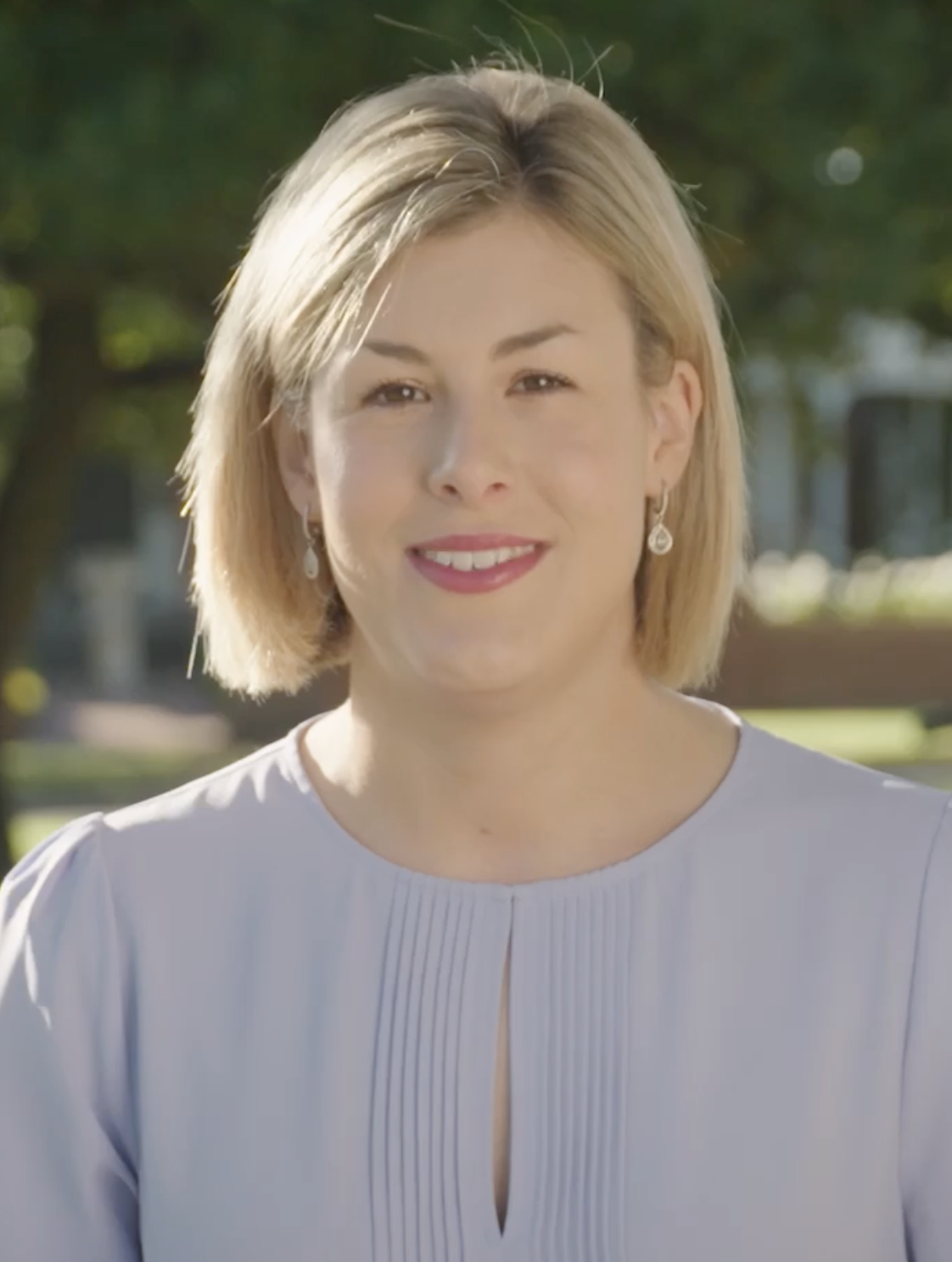
- Wilson in 2022

Leader of the Opposition in Victoria
- Incumbent
- Assumed office 18 November 2025
- Premier: Jacinta Allan; Ben Carroll
- Deputy: Sam Groth; David Southwick
- Preceded by: Brad Battin

Leader of the Victorian Liberal Party
- Incumbent
- Assumed office 18 November 2025
- Deputy: Sam Groth; David Southwick
- Preceded by: Brad Battin

Member of the Victorian Parliament for Kew
- Incumbent
- Assumed office 26 November 2022
- Preceded by: Tim Smith

Personal details
- Born: Jessica Kate Wilson; 25 April 1990 (age 36) Heidelberg, Victoria, Australia
- Party: Liberal
- Other political affiliations: Coalition
- Spouse: Aaron Lane
- Parent: Ron Wilson
- Education: Monash University
- Occupation: Lawyer
- Website: Personal website Party website

Jessica Kate Wilson (born 25 April 1990) is an Australian politician who has served as the leader of the Opposition in Victoria and the leader of the Victorian Liberal Party since 2025. She has been the member of parliament (MP) for the district of Kew since 2022.

Prior to entering politics, Wilson was Executive Director of Policy at the Business Council of Australia. She is the daughter of former state MP Ron Wilson.

== Political career ==
Wilson was president of the Victorian Young Liberals in 2016. During her time as the leader of the Young Liberals, she survived a challenge from moderate, self-described 'small-l-liberals', over frustration with the influence of the Institute of Public Affairs, a conservative think tank.

Prior to her candidacy for the seat of Kew, Wilson worked as an adviser to former federal treasurer Josh Frydenberg and as Executive Director of Policy at the Business Council of Australia.

Wilson was preselected to be Liberal candidate for the traditionally safe Liberal seat of Kew after defeating a number of pre-selection candidates including a senior Victorian Liberal figure, David Davis. At the 2022 Victorian state election, she defeated teal independent Sophie Torney (who later became the Mayor of Boroondara) and Labor candidate Lucy Skelton.

On 18 December 2022, Liberal Party leader John Pesutto announced that Wilson would join the opposition front bench, becoming the shadow minister for finance, shadow minister for economic reform and regulation, and shadow minister for home ownership and housing affordability. On 2 October 2023, as part of a shadow cabinet reshuffle, Wilson became the Shadow Minister for Early Childhood and Education in lieu of Home Ownership and Housing Affordability, retaining the Shadow Minister for Finance, and Shadow Minister for Economic Reform and Regulation portfolios.

On 26 December 2024, Wilson announced that she would nominate for the leadership of the Victorian Liberal Parliamentary Party if the following day's spill motion was successful. She was eliminated in the first round of voting. She was subsequently made shadow minister for education and shadow minister for industry and economic growth, replacing her previous portfolios.

After a shadow cabinet reshuffle caused by the resignation of two senior Liberal MPs, on 11 October 2025, Wilson was given the senior position of Shadow Treasurer of Victoria, replacing her other portfolios.

In October 2025, the ABC reported that Wilson was the most likely person to succeed Brad Battin amid growing frustration among MPs of the Victorian Liberal party.

=== Leadership spill ===
On 17 November 2025, ABC News reported that a cross-factional delegation of Liberal MPs informed Liberal leader Brad Battin that he had lost the support of the party room and that it understood that Wilson would nominate for the leadership of the party in a spill the following morning.

At the full Liberal party room meeting, members of the party's caucus voted 19 to 13 to allow the spill, after which Wilson was elected unopposed. Wilson became the first woman to lead the Victorian Liberals.

=== Opposition leader (2025–present) ===
On 30 November 2025, Wilson announced her shadow cabinet. The ministry was notable for including former Liberal leaders Brad Battin, who led the party before Wilson, and Matthew Guy, while excluding John Pesutto. Furthermore, Wilson retained her shadow treasurer role, breaking with Liberal Party precedent of the deputy having the treasury portfolio.

On 28 November 2025, Wilson announced that she would move a bill to ban coercive control, while seeking bipartisan support for the ban. On 3 December 2025, the Allan Government matched Wilson's commitment to criminalisation.

In April 2026, Wilson announced a series of justice policies, including expanding the range of offences treated as adult crimes to include burglary, serious assault and attempted murder, introducing a "one-strike" bail rule where offenders who reoffend while on bail would be automatically refused.

In May 2026, Wilson unveiled a 10-year economic plan, which included a freeze on non-frontline public sector positions.

From June 2026, Wilson announced a series of policies ahead of the November state election, including tougher penalties for serious offences, reforms to bail laws, greater housing development and a proposal to restore weekly rubbish collection across Victoria.

Wilson vowed to ban the term 'globalise the intifada' if elected.

== Political positions ==
In 2023, Wilson was the only Victorian Liberal MP who publicly supported the Indigenous Voice to Parliament. Ahead of the 2026 Victorian state election, Opposition Leader Wilson pledged that a Coalition government would repeal Victoria's statewide treaty legislation and abolish the representative body Gellung Warl, replacing it with a government department named First Nations Victoria. Former Treaty Advancement Commissioner Jill Gallagher stated that following through on the pledge would make Victoria the first government in the world to repeal a modern treaty.

Wilson is widely considered a moderate within the party, reflecting the politics of the seat she represents.

== Personal life ==
Wilson was baptised in the Catholic Church as an infant. She grew up in Melbourne's inner east. Her father Ron was also a Liberal Party state MP, being the member for Bennettswood between 1999 and 2002.

Wilson attended Mont Albert Primary School and Strathcona Baptist Girls Grammar, and completed tertiary education at Monash University. Wilson played hockey for the Kew Box Hill Hockey Club.

Victorian Legislative Assembly
Preceded by Tim Smith	Member for Kew; 2022–present	Incumbent
Political offices
Preceded by Brad Battin	Leader of the Opposition of Victoria; 2025–present	Incumbent
Party political offices
Preceded by Brad Battin	Leader of the Liberal Party in Victoria; 2025–present	Incumbent
