= 2021 Victorian Liberal Party leadership spills =

Leader selection contests within Victoria's opposition party

March 2021 Victorian Liberal Party leadership spill
- 16 March 2021
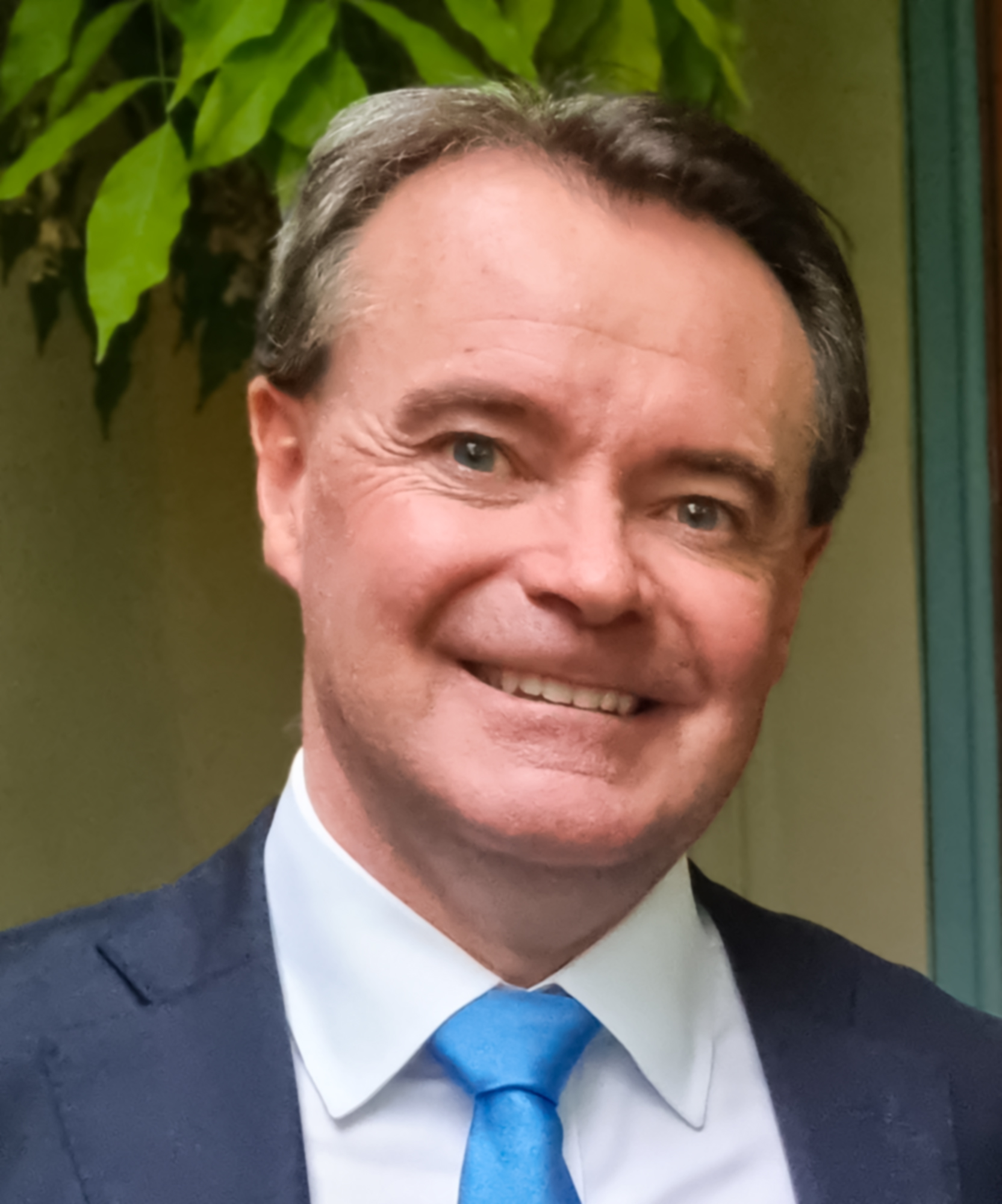

Candidate	Michael O'Brien	Spill motion
Percentage	70.97%	29.03%
Votes	22	9
Seat	Malvern
Leader before election
Michael O'Brien
Elected Leader
Michael O'Brien

September 2021 Victorian Liberal Party leadership spill
- 7 September 2021

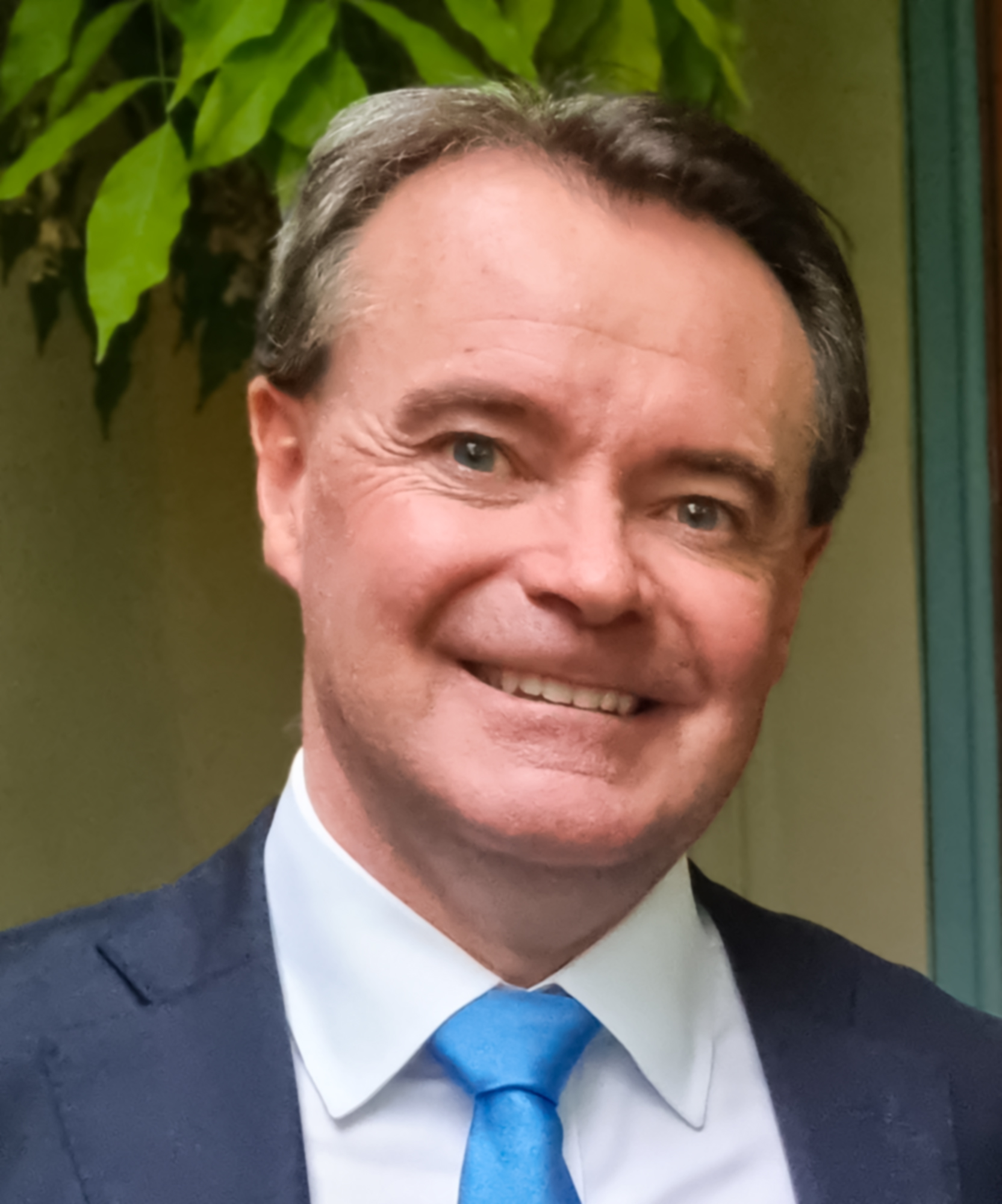
Candidate	Spill motion	Michael O'Brien
Percentage	64.52%	35.48%
Votes	20	11
Seat		Malvern
Leader before election
Michael O'Brien
Elected Leader
Vacant

September 2021 leadership election
- 7 September 2021
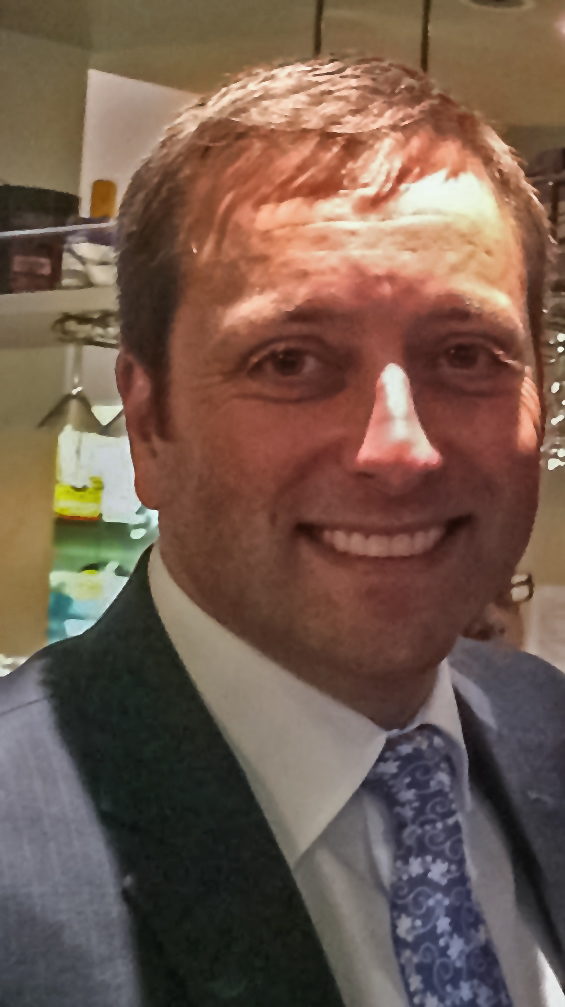
Candidate	Matthew Guy
Caucus	Unopposed
Seat	Bulleen
Leader before election
Vacant
Elected Leader
Matthew Guy

The 2021 Victorian Liberal Party leadership spills were two spill motions on 16 March and 7 September 2021 against the leader of the Victorian Liberal Party and Leader of the Opposition Michael O'Brien, who had held these roles since December 2018. The September spill motion was successful and resulted in a ballot to elect the new party leader and deputy party leader on the same day. Former leader, Matthew Guy, was elected unopposed as the party leader and Leader of the Opposition. Caulfield MP David Southwick defeated Louise Staley in the Deputy Leadership contest and was elected Deputy Leader, replacing Cindy McLeish who had been elected alongside O'Brien in 2018.

== First spill motion: 16 March ==
Following "months" of speculation surrounding the leadership of the Party, a spill motion was brought on at a party-room meeting on 16 March by long-time Liberal member of the Legislative Council Bruce Atkinson. It was believed that little-known Gembrook MP, and Shadow Spokesperson for roads, youth justice and crime prevention, Brad Battin, was pushing for a spill motion, with his intention to contest for the leadership. However, as Battin likely didn't have the votes to secure the motion, nor his success to the leadership, he backed out of the proposal.

The vote was ultimately a failure, with O'Brien winning the ballot 22–9. Following the vote, Battin stood down from his roles in the shadow cabinet; while Battin allies, and frontbench MPs, Nick Wakeling and Ryan Smith quit their roles.

=== Reactions ===
Following the spill attempt, former party leader and Opposition Leader, Matthew Guy, "insisted" he would not attempt to topple the leader before the next election in 2022, stating: "[it is] the end of the matter."

Labor Deputy Leader and acting Premier James Merlino said in a press conference regarding the leadership vote: "They're chaotic, they're a rabble and they are irrelevant." Further adding: "It just shows how irrelevant they are. We're focused on getting people back to work...they're focused on just one job, and protecting their own."

Former Liberal Premier Jeff Kennett said of the vote: "I don’t know where this came from I heard nothing about it[.] [It's] just politically naive, politically stupid, and it simply was brushed aside as it should have been.”

== Second spill motion: 7 September ==
On 7 September, after substantial indications that a spill motion would be put forward at a party meeting, including two key resignations the day prior (Matthew Guy, Tim Smith), Tim Smith, staunch ally of former leader Matthew Guy, moved for a leadership spill motion against incumbent Michael O'Brien. With Guy heavily favoured to return as leader, Michael O'Brien lost his mandate as leader in a leadership spill motion, 20–11; just over six months from the previous spill motion attempt.

The same day, after the vacancy of the leadership, Matthew Guy was elected unopposed as the new leader of the party. Several days later, Guy revealed his new shadow cabinet, dropping MPs who voted against the leadership spill motion.

== See also ==
- 2022 Victorian state election
