= Michael O'Brien (Victorian politician) =

Australian politician

The Honourable Michael O'Brien MP
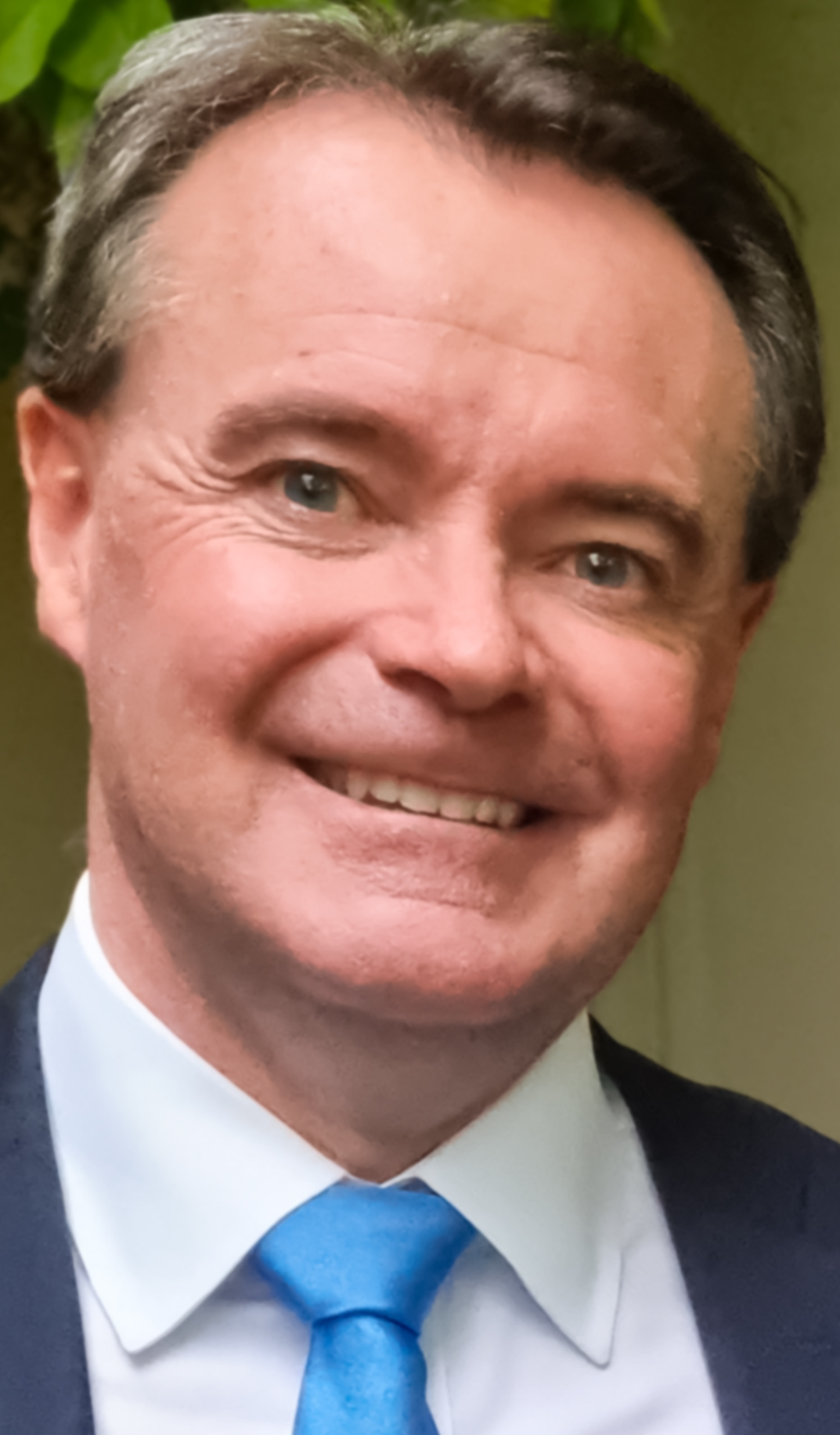
- O'Brien in 2022

Leader of the Opposition in Victoria
- In office 6 December 2018 – 7 September 2021
- Premier: Daniel Andrews
- Deputy: Peter Walsh
- Preceded by: Matthew Guy
- Succeeded by: Matthew Guy

Leader of the Liberal Party in Victoria
- In office 6 December 2018 – 7 September 2021
- Deputy: Cindy McLeish
- Preceded by: Matthew Guy
- Succeeded by: Matthew Guy

Treasurer of Victoria
- In office 13 March 2013 – 4 December 2014
- Premier: Denis Napthine
- Preceded by: Kim Wells
- Succeeded by: Tim Pallas

Minister for Energy & Resources, Consumer Affairs and Gaming
- In office 2 December 2010 – 13 March 2013
- Premier: Ted Baillieu
- Preceded by: Tony Robinson
- Succeeded by: Nicholas Kotsiras (Energy & Resources); Heidi Victoria (Consumer Affairs); Andrew McIntosh (Gaming)

Member of the Victorian Parliament for Malvern
- Incumbent
- Assumed office 25 November 2006
- Preceded by: Robert Doyle

Personal details
- Born: 5 August 1971 (age 55) Dublin, Ireland
- Party: Liberal
- Profession: Barrister

Michael Anthony O'Brien (born 5 August 1971) is an Australian politician. He has been a Liberal Party member of the Victorian Legislative Assembly since 2006, representing the electorate of Malvern and served as the leader of the party and opposition leader from December 2018 to September 2021. He served as the Shadow Attorney-General of Victoria until 11 October 2025.

O'Brien served as Minister for Gaming, Minister for Consumer Affairs and Minister for Energy and Resources in the Baillieu government from 2010 to 2013, and was promoted to Treasurer in the 2013–2014 Napthine government. Following the defeat of the Napthine government at the 2014 state election, O'Brien contested the leadership of the Liberal Party, but was defeated by Matthew Guy. Guy resigned the party leadership following the party's defeat at the 2018 state election. Subsequently, on 6 December 2018, O'Brien was elected leader of the Liberal Party and became opposition leader. On 7 September 2021, Guy successfully challenged O'Brien for the party leadership, and returned to the role of opposition leader.

== Education ==
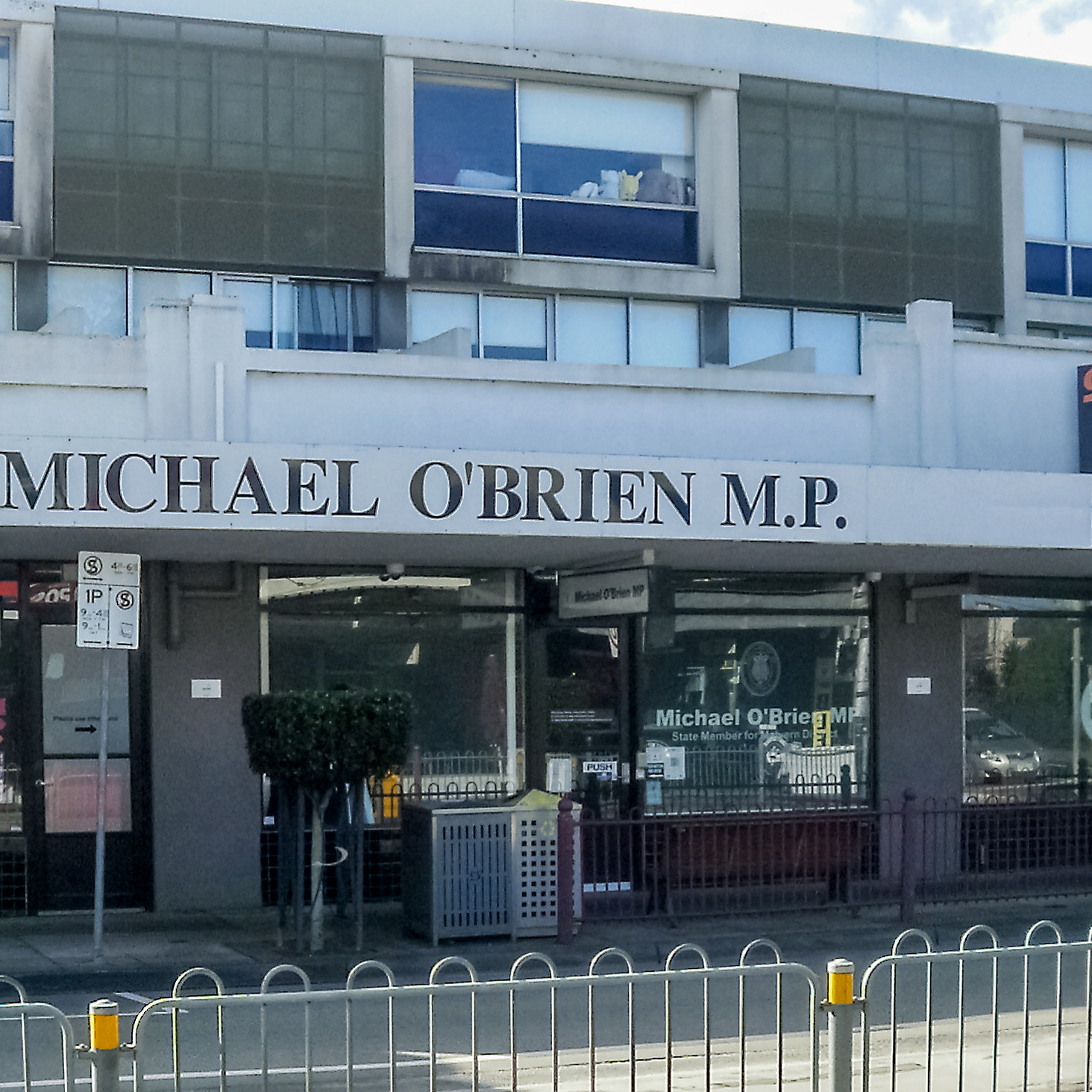
O'Brien's Electoral Office in Malvern East.

O'Brien underwent secondary education at Marcellin College before completing a Bachelor of Laws (Honours) and a Bachelor of Commerce from the University of Melbourne. He worked as a barrister at the Victorian Bar practising in the fields of trade practices and commercial law. With co-author Jamie Richardson, O'Brien won the Law Institute of Victoria's Rogers Legal Writing Award in 2006. While at the Bar he also lectured part-time in trade practices at the Leo Cussen Institute of Continuing Legal Education and performed pro bono work.

== Political career ==
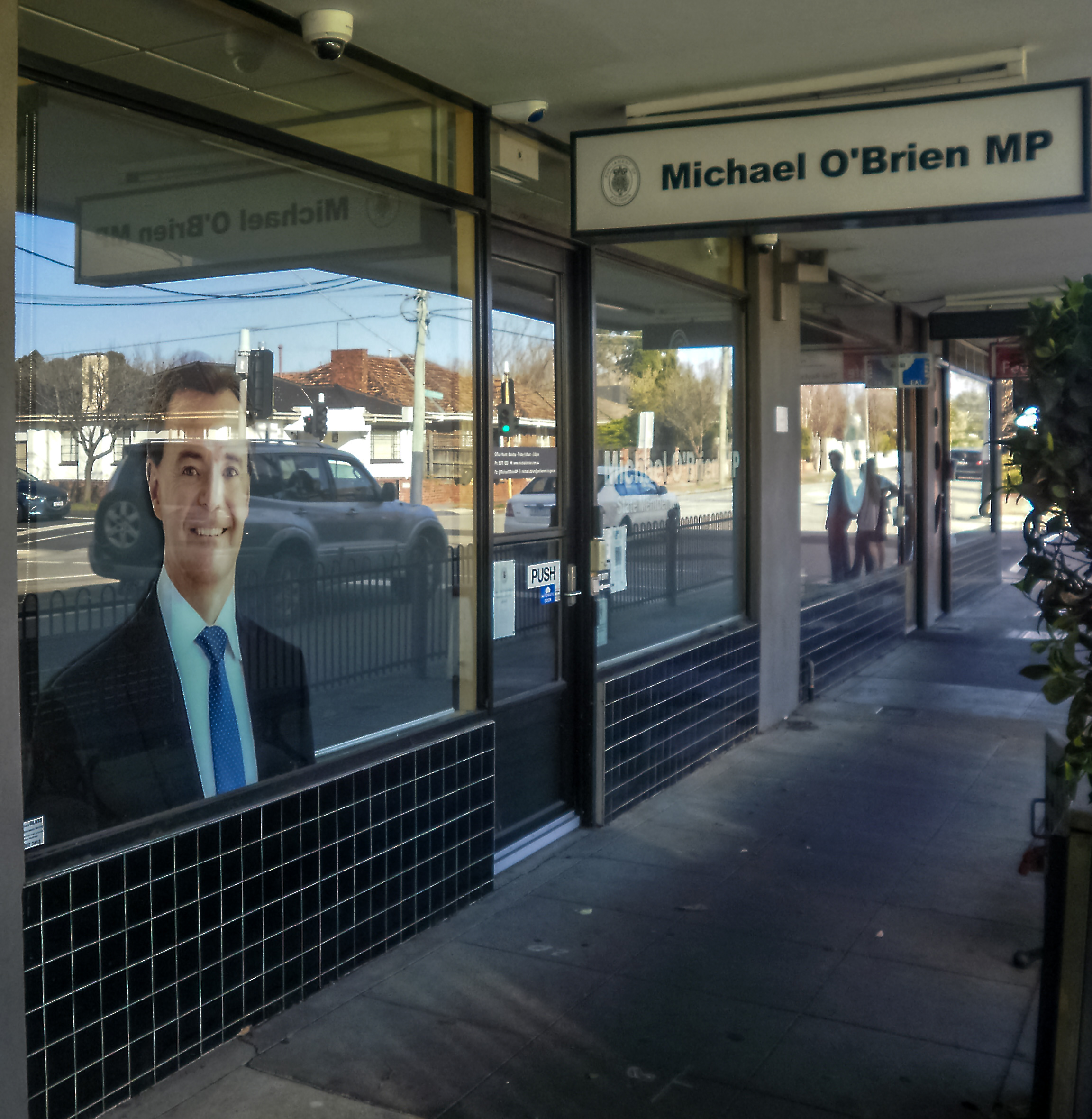
O'Brien's Electoral Office in Malvern East.

O'Brien served as a senior adviser to the former Federal Treasurer Peter Costello for five years.

He stood for the Liberal Party in the blue-ribbon seat of Malvern at the 2006 state election, winning with over 60 per cent of two-candidate-preferred votes.

On 6 December 2006, he was appointed to the Shadow Cabinet by the State Opposition leader, Ted Baillieu, to the position of Shadow Minister for Gaming. He was one of three newly elected Liberal MPs who were immediately promoted to Shadow Cabinet following the 2006 election, the others being Mary Wooldridge and Matthew Guy.

In August 2007, he was promoted to Shadow Minister for Consumer Affairs—taking over from Wendy Lovell—in addition to his responsibilities for gaming. In April 2009, he called for the Brumby Government to change company share laws so that apartment owners could take consumer cases to the Victorian Civil and Administrative Tribunal, instead of having to go the Supreme Court.

In November 2009, O'Brien was promoted in a shadow cabinet reshuffle. He had been tipped to gain a "senior portfolio" but ended up in charge of three separate economic portfolios: infrastructure and public-private partnerships; energy and resources; and exports and trade. He told a local newspaper that he was "delighted with the changes" and was looking forward to "developing a better alternative to Labor's poor performance [in energy security and improved infrastructure]". He retained the gaming and consumer affairs portfolios.

Following the election of the Victorian Liberal Nationals Coalition at the 2010 state election, O'Brien was sworn in on 2 December 2010 as Minister for Energy and Resources, Minister for Gaming and Minister for Consumer Affairs.

In 2011 the Victorian Government proposed changing the Gaming Regulation Act to make it an offence to insult the Minister. The Opposition responded by calling him "Windscreens O'Brien – because this proves he's got a glass jaw".

After the move of Liberal MP Geoff Shaw to the crossbenches and the resignation of Premier Ted Baillieu in March 2013, O'Brien became Treasurer of Victoria in the ministry of the Napthine minority government.

Matthew Guy was elected as leader of the Liberal Party in a leadership ballot contested on 4 December 2014, making him Leader of the Opposition after defeating Michael O'Brien for the position. Matthew Guy made O'Brien shadow treasurer in opposition.

=== Leader of the Opposition 2018–2021 ===
On 6 December 2018, O'Brien was elected the leader of the Liberal party after Guy resigned following the 2018 state election defeat. He then arranged his Shadow Cabinet, with Cindy McLeish his deputy.

O'Brien regularly attacked the government on its COVID-19 lockdown policies, more specifically contact tracing and hotel quarantine failures, even raising a motion of no confidence in the government. He also criticised then health minister, Martin Foley, on disregarding the mental health impacts of the lockdowns.

In an Ipsos poll commissioned by The Age and Nine News in October 2020, only 15% of respondents approved of O'Brien's performance during the COVID-19 pandemic and 39% disapproved of his performance, with O'Brien trailing Daniel Andrews as preferred premier by 53% to 18%; among Coalition supporters, only 27% approved of his performance. Despite this negative polling, O'Brien stated that he was confident of remaining leader of the Victorian Liberals in 2022.

=== Post-leadership 2021–present ===
On 7 September 2021, O'Brien was replaced by Guy as party leader and opposition leader in a leadership spill. Initially, he declined to be in Guy's shadow cabinet, but in February 2022, he was appointed as shadow attorney-general, a role which he has held to the 11 October 2025.

O’Brien was re-elected to his seat of Malvern at the 2022 election, with a primary vote of 52.8%.

On 9 September 2025, O'Brien announced he will retire from Parliament at the 2026 Victorian state election, making him become replaced as Shadow Attorney-General by James Newbury on 11 October 2025.

== Political views ==
O'Brien is widely considered a moderate within the Liberal Party, and is conscious about climate change.

He is focused on making the party more appealing to the traditional moderate 'Liberal heartland' areas lost in the 2022 federal election, an area in which his seat is situated.

== Personal life ==
Michael O'Brien lives in his Malvern electorate with his wife and two children.

O'Brien supports the Carlton Football Club in the Australian Football League, plays golf, and co-founded the Spring Street Blues, a Victorian MP supporter group for Carlton.

He is also a fan of Scottish football club Celtic F.C.

== See also ==
- Shadow Ministry of Michael O'Brien

Victorian Legislative Assembly
Preceded by Robert Doyle	Member for Malvern; 2006–present	Incumbent
Political offices
Preceded by Tony Robinson	Minister for Gaming; 2010–2013	Succeeded by Andrew McIntosh as Minister for Gaming Regulation
Preceded by Tony Robinson	Minister for Consumer Affairs; 2010–2013	Succeeded by Heidi Victoria
Preceded by Peter Batchelor	Minister for Energy and Resources; 2010–2013	Succeeded by Nicholas Kotsiras
Preceded by Kim Wells	Treasurer of Victoria; 2013–2014	Succeeded by Tim Pallas
Preceded by Matthew Guy	Leader of the Opposition in Victoria; 2018–2021	Succeeded by Matthew Guy
Party political offices
Preceded by Matthew Guy	Leader of the Liberal Party in Victoria; 2018–2021	Succeeded by Matthew Guy
