= Electoral district of Eildon =

State electoral district of Victoria, Australia

Coordinates: 37.391°S 145.902°E

Eildon Victoria—Legislative Assembly
- Interactive map of electoral district boundaries from the 2022 state election
- State: Victoria
- Created: 2014
- MP: Cindy McLeish
- Party: Liberal
- Namesake: Town of Eildon
- Electors: 44,881 (2018)
- Area: 10,061 km^{2} (3,884.6 sq mi)
- Demographic: Rural
Electorates around Eildon:
Euroa	Euroa	Ovens Valley
Yan Yean	Eildon	Gippsland East
Evelyn; Monbulk	Narracan	Narracan

The electoral district of Eildon is an electoral district of the Victorian Legislative Assembly in Australia. It was created in the redistribution of electoral boundaries in 2013, which came into effect at the 2014 state election and is a member of the Northern Victoria Region.

It is a new district created due to the abolition of the districts of Seymour and Benalla, taking in area to the south of these districts toward the outer north-eastern suburbs of Melbourne. It includes the towns of Alexandra, Eildon, Healesville, Jamieson, Kinglake, Marysville, Mansfield, Powelltown, Warburton, Yea and other towns in the Mansfield, Murrindindi, Yarra Ranges and Nillumbik local government areas.

The abolished seat of Seymour was held by Liberal MP Cindy McLeish, who retained the new seat at the 2014 election.

== Members ==
Member	Party	Term
Cindy McLeish	Liberal	2014–present

== Election results ==
2022 Victorian state election: Eildon
Party	Candidate	Votes	%	±%
Liberal	Cindy McLeish	20,119	47.4	+0.7
Labor	Jane Judd	12,284	29.0	−7.9
Greens	Wil Mikelsons	4,753	11.2	+0.4
Family First	Tim Lacey	1,437	3.4	+3.4
Freedom	Joshua Rusic	1,426	3.4	+3.4
Animal Justice	Chloe Bond	1,340	3.2	+3.2
Ind. (Fusion)	Kammy Cordner Hunt	581	1.4	+1.4
Ind. (Aligned Australia)	Robert Thornton	459	1.1	+1.1
Total formal votes		42,399	94.8	+0.1
Informal votes		2,343	5.2	−0.1
Turnout		44,742	89.3	−1.8
Two-party-preferred result
Liberal	Cindy McLeish	24,162	57.0	+5.9
Labor	Jane Judd	18,237	43.0	−5.9
Liberal hold		Swing	+5.9	

Two-party-preferred vote results in Eildon View source data.
