= Emma Kealy =

Australian politician

Emma Kealy MP
- Kealy in 2026

Deputy Leader of the National Party in Victoria
- Incumbent
- Assumed office 11 July 2022
- Leader: Peter Walsh; Danny O'Brien
- Preceded by: Steph Ryan

Member of the Victorian Legislative Assembly for Lowan
- Incumbent
- Assumed office 29 November 2014
- Preceded by: Hugh Delahunty

Personal details
- Born: 29 May 1977 (age 49) Edenhope, Victoria, Australia
- Party: National Party
- Education: University of South Australia
- Website: http://www.emmakealy.com

Emma Jayne Kealy (born 29 May 1977) is an Australian politician. She has been a National Party member of the Victorian Legislative Assembly since November 2014, representing the Legislative Assembly seat of Lowan.

Kealy was born and raised in Edenhope, Victoria, where six generations of her family have worked as farmers. She gained a Bachelor of Biomedical Science from the University of South Australia, before living in the Northern Territory, Melbourne and Hamilton, Victoria, and then moving back to Edenhope to work as chief executive of the Edenhope and District Memorial Hospital.

Since being elected, Kealy has established a moderate record in parliamentary votes and on policy generally. Despite her reticence towards expressing a view on abortion prior to the 2014 election, Kealy was a supporter of legislation to legalise euthanasia, same-sex adoption, and to restrict protests in the vicinity of abortion clinics. Kealy is also an advocate for a greener approach to climate change and has openly disavowed the more cautious approach of her federal leader Barnaby Joyce.

Prior to the 2018 Victorian state election, Kealy became embroiled in controversy over her use of taxpayer-funded printing entitlements. Deputy Premier James Merlino referred Kealy to the State Ombudsman, alleging that Kealy had asked a local newspaper in her electorate, the Hamilton Spectator, to falsify invoices to enable taxpayer-funded advertising to run in the newspaper during November 2018 contrary to the prohibition against the use of MP allowances during the caretaker election period. Blame for the affair was ultimately placed on the shoulders of an inexperienced advertising consultant at the Hamilton Spectator, and no further disciplinary action was taken against Kealy.

After the 2018 Victorian state election, Kealy continued in her role as Shadow Minister for Mental Health, Prevention of Family Violence, and Women. Despite being expected to advocate for the rights and status of women in her capacity as Shadow Minister for Women, Kealy surprised some observers by failing to join local female leaders in condemning Hindmarsh Shire Mayor, Ron Ismay, for using what the ABC chose to describe as sexist language, in introducing Kealy to an audience of young families and children at the opening ceremony for Nhill skate park in October 2019. Hindmarsh Shire Council passed a motion formally apologising to Kealy, and local women's groups condemned the language for reducing women to their physical appearance and reinforcing gender stereotypes. Kealy herself opted not to comment any further on the matter.

Kealy was appointed deputy leader of the Victorian Nationals in July 2022, but was overlooked for the leadership in November 2024 when Danny O'Brien seized the party leadership from Peter Walsh. Kealy denied being disappointed and told media that she had nominated O'Brien for the role.

Victorian Legislative Assembly
| Preceded by Hugh Delahunty | Member for Lowan; 2014–present | Incumbent |
Party political offices
| Preceded by Steph Ryan | Deputy Leader of the National Party in Victoria; 2022–present | Incumbent |
