= James Newbury =

Australian politician (born 1978)

James Newbury MP
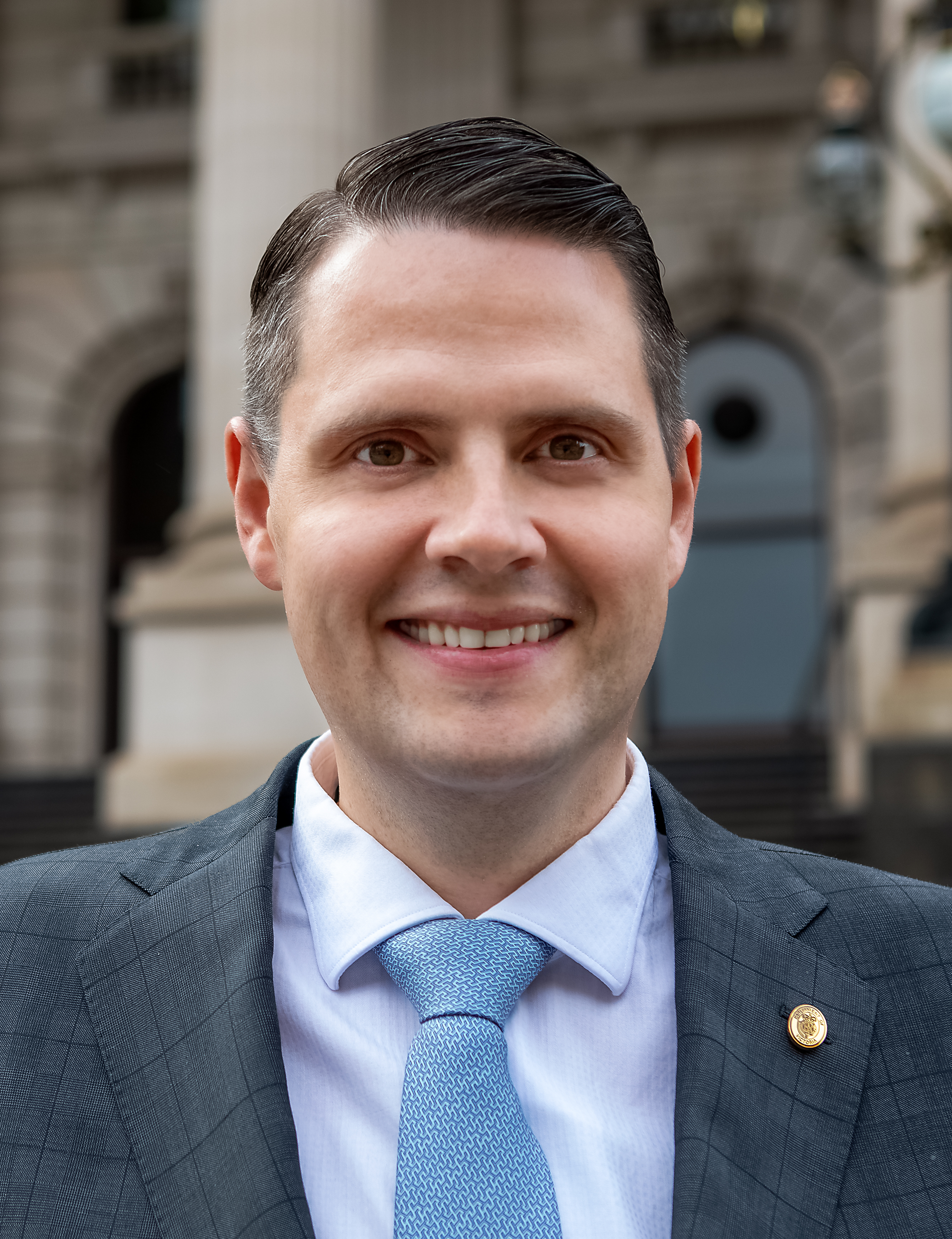
- Newbury in 2019

Member of the Victorian Legislative Assembly for Brighton
- Incumbent
- Assumed office 24 November 2018
- Preceded by: Louise Asher

Personal details
- Born: James Benjamin Kingsley Newbury; 13 May 1978 (age 48) Melbourne, Victoria, Australia
- Party: Liberal

James Benjamin Kingsley Newbury (born 13 May 1978) is an Australian politician. He has been a Liberal Party member of the Victorian Legislative Assembly since November 2018, representing the seat of Brighton.

== Early life ==
Newbury grew up in Malvern East, and his grandfather, Dr Charles Renton Newbury, was President of the World Dental Federation and a recipient of a CBE.

Newbury joined the Liberal Party in 1999.

== Career ==
Newbury was a Liberal staffer in Canberra and Melbourne before his election, and holds three degrees.

Newbury's university degrees include a Juris Doctor (Post Graduate Level Degree), a Master of Business (Law), and a Bachelor of Business (Law). He is an admitted lawyer in Australia.

In the Liberal Party, Newbury worked as a Senior Adviser to the Victorian Premier Denis Napthine, a Parliamentary Adviser to the Hon Christopher Pyne, a Parliamentary Adviser to the Hon Joe Hockey; and worked for a number of other Parliamentarians including Senator Richard Alston, the Hon Tony Abbott, and Senator Mitch Fifield.

Between December 2018 and September 2021, Newbury held the positions of Shadow Assistant Minister for Wastewatch and Shadow Assistant Minister for Freedom of Information.

Between March 2021 and September 2021, Newbury was Shadow Assistant Minister for Scrutiny of Government.

Between September 2021 and February 2022, Newbury held the position of Shadow Assistant Treasurer, Shadow Minister for Economic Development, Shadow Minister for Scrutiny of Government and Shadow Minister for Government Services and Public Sector Integrity.

Between September 2021 and December 2022, Newbury held the positions of Shadow Minister for Equality, Shadow Minister for Bay Protection, Shadow Minister for Environment and Climate Change and Shadow Special Minister of State.

In the Shadow Cabinet reshuffle by incoming leader John Pesutto in December 2022, Newbury retained the portfolios of Equality and Environment and Climate Change but was also elevated to the leadership team as Manager of Opposition Business.

In the Shadow Cabinet reshuffle under Brad Battin in January 2025, Newbury was appointed Shadow Treasurer.

== Politics ==
Newbury was a backer of Michael Kroger to be the president of the Liberal Party in Victoria. He also was a close ally of Marcus Bastiaan, who claimed to control a large portion of the administrative committee. This group generally aimed to install conservative politicians, or have moderates toe a more conservative line. Newbury is considered a moderate who has "sought to return the party to its centre."

Newbury won preselection for the district of Brighton in 2016, receiving support from prominent outgoing MP Louise Asher who described Newbury as "one of the most outstanding individuals with whom I have had the pleasure to work" in a reference letter.

This was the cause of some disappointment in the Liberal ranks, as it would lead to a reduction in their female representation. Newbury's victory came with allegations of branch stacking.

In the 2018 election, Newbury retained his seat for the Liberal Party. However, he experienced a swing of 8.7% against him, significantly reducing his previously safe majority. His primary challenger was a 19-year-old Labor Party candidate who had joined the party two months before the election and ran a campaign with a budget of $1,750.

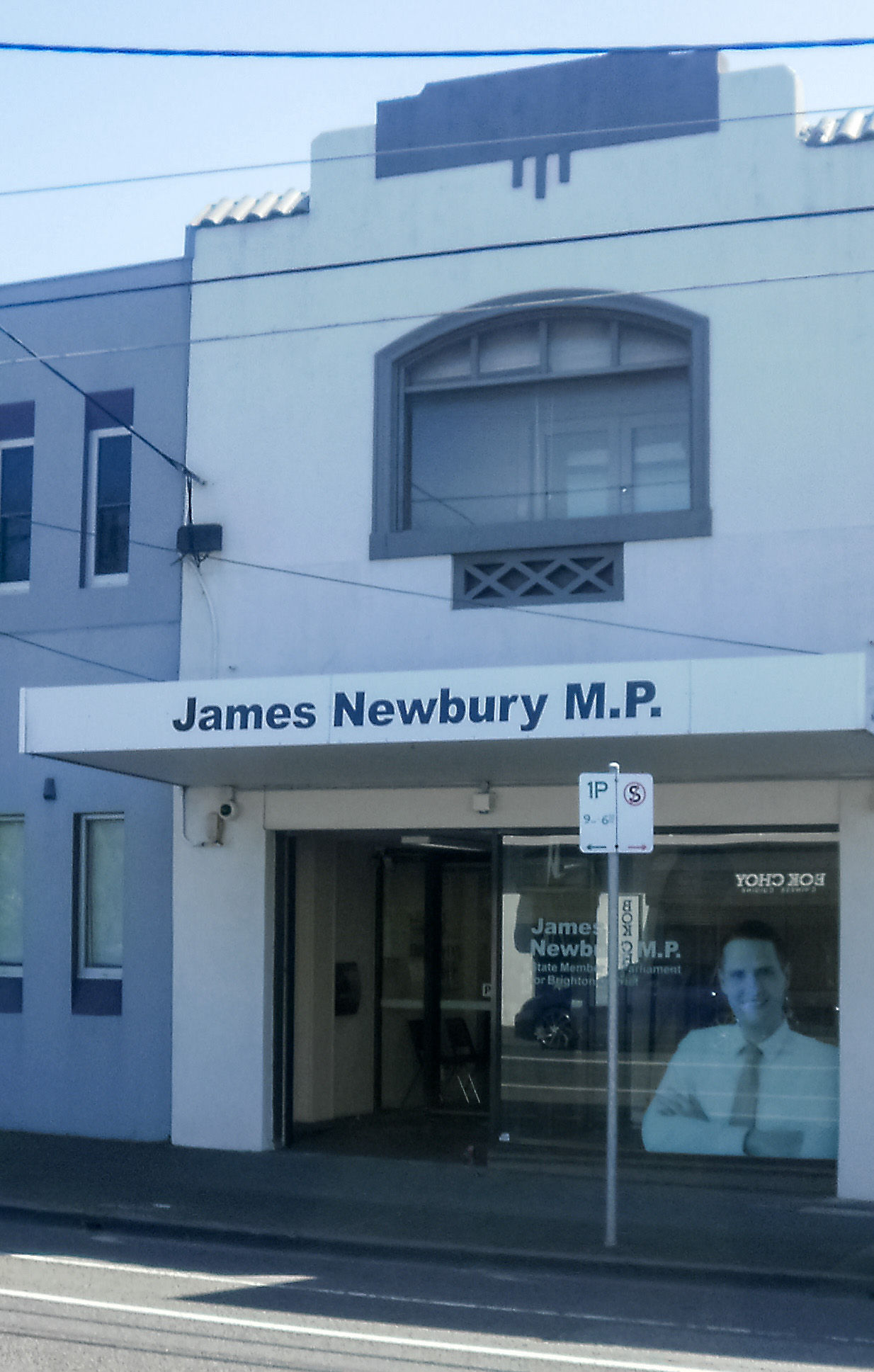
Newburys Office on New Street Brighton

He was criticised during the campaign for campaigning to close a homeless shelter in his electorate.

Newbury defeated former Bayside Council Mayor, Felicity Frederico to retain Liberal Party preselection for the 2022 state election, defeating Labor's Louise Crawford and Frederico, who ran as an independent, at that election. He retained the seat with a swing of 4.6% towards him.

Newbury has expressed deep concern over the leadership of Victorian Liberal Party President Greg Mirabella, joining former Victorian Opposition Leader Matthew Guy in condemning Mirabella’s conduct during and after the 2022 Victorian State Election.

The Age newspaper reported that Newbury had spoken at a meeting of the Liberal Party’s Administrative Committee, slamming Mirabella’s proposed one-man review of the election, saying he believed private reviews “would not be founded in truth, and feared it could be hijacked by self-serving politics and factionalism”.

Newbury voted to expel Moira Deeming from the parliamentary Liberal Party in 2023, but later voted to re-admit her, and voted for Brad Battin in the subsequent 2024 Victorian Liberal Party leadership spill.

On 14 October 2025, Newbury was one of a number of Liberal MPs who applauded the speeches of Aboriginal activists who spoke in favour of treaty, during parliamentary debate on the Statewide Treaty Bill 2025.

On 03 May 2026, Newbury at the time holding positions of Opposition Attorney-General and Shadow Minister for Equality posted to his X(formerly Twitter), Facebook and Instagram accounts after the Liberal Party claimed the seat of Nepean after a by-election. The post used the words "Tick Tock Jacinta Allan. Victoria is coming for Labor with baseball bats". The post on X has since been deleted although it remains on his Instagram and Facebook profiles as of 05/05/2026. Considerable backlash has been received from organisations such as The Red Heart Movement and Toilet Paper Australia.

== Political positions ==
=== Abortion ===
Newbury is a supporter of abortion rights, who criticised a Liberal Party colleague Bernie Finn in May 2022, calling his anti-abortion views "deeply disturbing and dangerous". He also stated that governments should not "legislate control over a woman's body".

=== COVID-19 lockdowns ===
Newbury was a vocal critic of the Victorian lockdowns.

Newbury was criticised for sharing a photo on social media that showed a girl's self-harm. He linked the post to the COVID-19 lockdown and the strain on mental health, later removing the post from Twitter two hours after he posted it.

=== Crime ===
Newbury has backed the idea that police should be able to racially profile people that they question, and to store that information for future reference.

Newbury has been a vocal critic of Victoria’s bail laws and crime trends, particularly in his Bayside electorate, pushing for reforms he says will address what he calls a "crime crisis.”

=== Duck hunting ===
Newbury has criticised the practice of duck hunting, and called for the practice to be stopped.

=== Environment ===
Newbury has called for an end to the state’s culls to Victoria's feral brumby population, pledging to stop the eradication, if elected to government.

=== LGBTQ affairs ===
Newbury has supported maintaining Victoria's strict anti-conversion therapy laws, funding LGBTQ community radio and providing a "dedicated professional legal support service" to LGBTQ Victorians.

Newbury drew media attention when he gave an "iron clad guarantee" that the Victorian Liberals would not amend new laws banning gay conversion therapy. Newbury's views angered more conservative elements, including "hard-right Liberal backbencher" Bernie Finn now a member of Family First and Nationals leader Peter Walsh, who was recorded using foul language about Newbury in a Coalition partyroom meeting in which Walsh stated that the Nationals did not support Newbury's stance on the conversion therapy ban.

=== Planning and housing ===
In 2024, Newbury criticised the Allan government’s housing plan for higher density living in activity centres in Melbourne to address lack of housing supply. He was criticised in December 2024, including by the Nationals, for labelling the Premier and Treasurer, who both represent regional Victorian electorates, as ‘out-of-towners’ in regard to the government’s housing and planning initiatives for Melbourne.

Newbury has strongly opposed the Victorian Labor Government’s rezoning and high-rise plans in Brighton, arguing they will undermine the suburb’s character and livability. He has joined protests and labelled the proposal to permit towers up to 20 storeys near stations as “desperate”.

=== Tax and economic reform ===
Newbury was Victoria’s Shadow Treasurer from January to October 2025. In the 2025 Opposition Budget Reply speech, Newbury unveiled the Liberal-National Coalition’s “Go For Growth” plan, promising to restore financial integrity, unleash private sector job creation, support workers, ease cost-of-living pressures, and more responsibly manage state debt.

Parliament of Victoria
Preceded by Louise Asher	Member for Brighton; 2018–present	Incumbent
