= Georgie Crozier =

Australian politician (born 1963)

Georgie Crozier MLC
- Crozier in 2026

Leader of the Opposition in the Victorian Legislative Council
- In office 8 December 2022 – 27 December 2024
- Deputy: Matthew Bach; Evan Mulholland
- Leader: John Pesutto
- Preceded by: David Davis
- Succeeded by: David Davis

Leader of the Liberal Party in the Victorian Legislative Council
- In office 8 December 2022 – 27 December 2024
- Deputy: Matthew Bach; Evan Mulholland
- Leader: John Pesutto
- Preceded by: David Davis
- Succeeded by: David Davis

Deputy Leader of the Liberal Party in the Victorian Legislative Council
- In office 5 December 2018 – 8 December 2022
- Leader: David Davis
- Preceded by: Gordon Rich-Phillips
- Succeeded by: Matthew Bach

Member of the Victorian Legislative Council for Southern Metropolitan Region
- Incumbent
- Assumed office 27 November 2010
- Preceded by: Jennifer Huppert

Personal details
- Born: 16 November 1963 (age 62) Coleraine, Victoria
- Party: Liberal Party
- Education: Geelong Grammar School
- Alma mater: Deakin University; Swinburne University
- Occupation: Nurse; Midwife; Business Manager; Consultant; Politician
- Website: www.georgiecrozier.com.au

Georgina Mary Crozier (born 16 November 1963) is an Australian politician. She has been a Liberal Party member of the Victorian Legislative Council since 2010, representing Southern Metropolitan Region. She also served as the Leader of the Opposition in the Legislative Council from 2022 to 2024.

Under the Napthine Government, Crozier was appointed Parliamentary Secretary for Health. Following the 2014 state election, she was appointed Shadow Minister for Families and Children, Women and the Prevention of Family Violence, adding the Housing portfolio in September 2017.

After the 2018 state election, she was elected Deputy Leader of the Liberal Party in the Legislative Council and appointed Shadow Minister for Health and Ambulance Services.

== Early life and education ==
Crozier was born in Coleraine, Victoria to Digby Crozier and Mary Jill Salter. She is one of four siblings. Her father was a member for Western Province in the Victorian Legislative Council from 1973 to 1985, and the member for Portland from 1985 to 1988. He also served as a minister in the Hamer and Thompson governments. Her great-great-grandfather, John Crozier was a member of the South Australian Legislative Council from 1867 to 1887.

Crozier attended Geelong Grammar School before commencing general nurse training at the Alfred Hospital in 1983 and midwifery training at the Royal Women's Hospital in 1990. She holds a Bachelor of Nursing and Graduate Certificate in Diabetes Education from Deakin University and a Certificate in Management and Leadership from Swinburne University.

== Professional career ==
After leaving school, Crozier worked as an administrative assistant in 1982, before completing general nurse training between 1983 and 1986. She completed midwifery training in 1990 and subsequently worked as a midwife between 1991 and 1994. Following that, she worked as a consultant and hospital supervisor at the Royal Women's Hospital between 1994 and 2000. She was an executive search/recruitment consultant between 2000 and 2006, a business manager between 2006 and 2008, and a business consultant from 2008 until her election in 2010.

== Political career ==
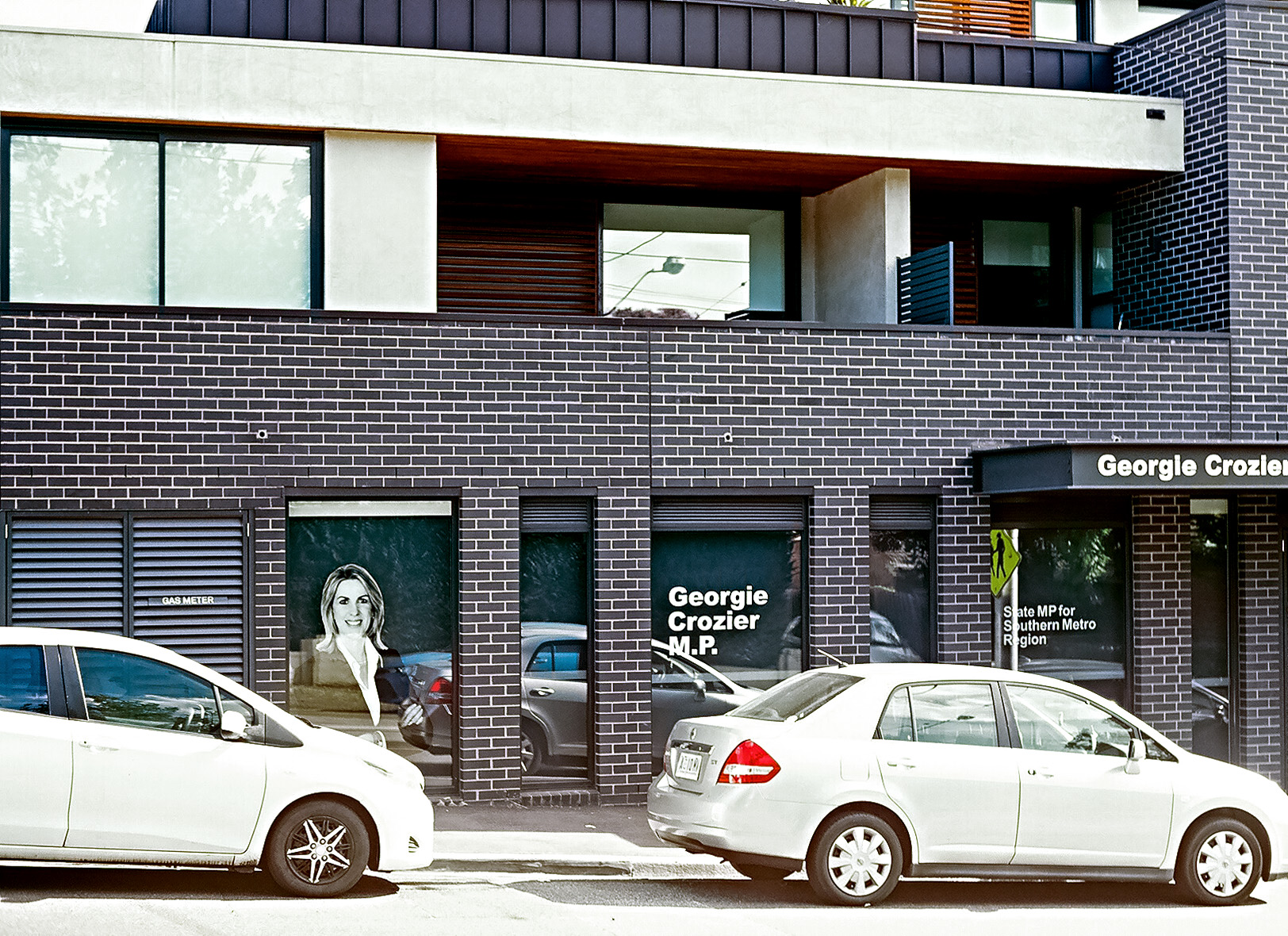
Croziers office in Camberwell East, Victoria.

=== Baillieu–Napthine Governments (2010–2014) ===
In 2010, Crozier was elected as the fourth member for Southern Metropolitan Region. Following the resignation of Ted Baillieu in March 2013, Dennis Napthine became Premier and appointed Crozier as Parliamentary Secretary for Health.

Crozier chaired the Family and Community Development Committee's Inquiry into the Handling of Child Abuse by Religious and Other Organisations. Known as the Betrayal of Trust Inquiry, it uncovered shocking widespread and systemic abuse of children in many organisations, dating back decades.

The inquiry's 750-page report was tabled in November 2013 and recommended sweeping legislative changes to both civil and criminal laws. The recommendations included allowing victims to seek adequate compensation and the creation of a new criminal offence of turning a blind eye to sexual abuse. The inquiry was important in leading to legislative reforms which removed the statute of limitations on historical sexual abuse claims and was a catalyst for the Commonwealth Royal Commission into Institutional Responses to Child Sexual Abuse.

=== Opposition (2014–present) ===
Following Napthine's defeat at the 2014 state election, Matthew Guy was elected leader of the Victorian Liberal Party and Crozier was appointed Shadow Minister for Families and Children, Shadow Minister for Prevention of Family Violence, Shadow Minister for Women, and Shadow Cabinet Secretary. In September 2017, she was appointed Shadow Minister for Housing, ceding her positions as Shadow Minister for Women and Shadow Cabinet Secretary.

Following the 2018 state election, Crozier was elected Deputy Leader of the Opposition and Deputy Leader of the Liberal Party in the Legislative Council, and appointed by Michael O'Brien as Shadow Minister for Health and Shadow Minister for Ambulance Services.

In February 2024, Crozier experienced an attempted home invasion. The offender fell from her roof but continued to try to effect an entry by kicking at a door, only fleeing when the police arrived.
