= Cindy McLeish =

Australian politician

Cindy McLeish MP

Deputy Leader of the Victorian Liberal Party
- In office 6 December 2018 – 7 September 2021
- Leader: Michael O'Brien
- Preceded by: David Hodgett
- Succeeded by: David Southwick

Member of the Victorian Legislative Assembly for Eildon
- Incumbent
- Assumed office 29 November 2014
- Preceded by: New seat

Member of the Victorian Legislative Assembly for Seymour
- In office 27 November 2010 – 29 November 2014
- Preceded by: Ben Hardman
- Succeeded by: Seat abolished

Personal details
- Born: 26 April 1962 (age 64) Yea, Victoria
- Party: Liberal
- Spouse: Jeff Moss
- Education: University of Melbourne

Lucinda Gaye "Cindy" McLeish (born 26 April 1962) is an Australian politician, and has been a member of the Victorian Legislative Assembly since 2010, representing Seymour until 2014 and Eildon thereafter. She served as the Deputy Leader of the Victorian Liberal Party from December 2018 to September 2021 under Michael O'Brien, after the 2018 state election, and was replaced by David Southwick after a leadership spill.

== Early life, personal life, and pre-political career ==
McLeish was born and raised in Yea, in the north of the electorate, growing up on the family farm. She said her family had been in the area since the early 1840s. Her mother had the Railway Hotel (now the Peppercorn) in Yea for many years.

After completing high school in Yea, McLeish attended University of Melbourne and completed a Bachelor of Science and a Diploma of Education, this was followed by a Graduate Diploma in counseling, after which she was able to register as a Psychologist. McLeish, before entering parliament, worked also had experience working as a teacher.

In 2001, McLeish completed an MBA from Melbourne Business School. She was CEO of Women's Golf Victoria for many years, and worked in the area of organisational effectiveness and leadership capability at Right Management prior to becoming elected.

McLeish is married to former Test cricketer, Jeff Moss.

== Political career ==
McLeish had just 18 days as Liberal candidate for the 2010 state election after replacing Mike Laker, who stepped down at the end of October citing personal reasons.

Following the Napthine Coalition Government's defeat at the 2014 Victorian State Election, McLeish was appointed Shadow Assistant Minister for Communities & Volunteers.

In December 2018, McLeish was elected unopposed as Deputy Leader of the Victorian Liberal Party taking on roles as Shadow Minister for Education, Youth Affairs and Regional Cities. She was replaced by David Southwick in September 2021.

From September 2017, McLeish has continually served in various Shadow Ministerial roles, and is currently serving as the Shadow Minister for Crime Prevention since January 2025 and Shadow Minister for the Prevention of Family Violence and Shadow Minister for Women since December 2022.

In June 2023, McLeish was called a "halfwit grub" by then Premier of Victoria, Daniel Andrews, over her raising a point of order arguing that Labor MP Kat Theophanous should abstain from voting on a bill, after it came out that Theophanous's father had lobbied for a developer in order to raise funds for his daughter's campaign, which Theophanous was unwitting to.

Victorian Legislative Assembly
Preceded by Ben Hardman	Member for Seymour; 2010–2014	Abolished
New seat	Member for Eildon; 2014–present	Incumbent
