= Electoral results for the district of Nepean =

Election results for Nepean, Victoria, Australia

This is a list of electoral results for the district of Nepean in Victorian state elections.

== Members for Nepean ==
Member	Party	Term
Martin Dixon	Liberal	2002–2018
Chris Brayne	Labor	2018–2022
Sam Groth	Liberal	2022–2026
Anthony Marsh	Liberal	2026–present

== Election results ==
=== Elections in the 2020s ===
==== 2026 by-election ====
2026 Nepean state by-election
Party	Candidate	Votes	%	±%
Liberal	Anthony Marsh	14,927	38.5	−9.6
One Nation	Darren Hercus	9,556	24.7	+24.7
Independent	Tracee Hutchison	8,239	21.3	+21.3
Greens	Sianan Healy	3,597	9.3	+0.5
Legalise Cannabis	Renee Thompson	1,126	2.9	+2.9
Sustainable Australia	Reade Smith	668	1.7	+1.7
Libertarian	Peter Angelico	475	1.2	+1.2
EMI – Reform	Milton Wilde	157	0.4	−0.9 (Note: Change calculated from the party's prior performance as the Companions and Pets Party.)
Total formal votes		38,745	95.4	+1.7
Informal votes		1,867	4.6	−1.7
Turnout		40,612	79.8	
Registered electors		50,910		
Two-candidate-preferred result
Liberal	Anthony Marsh	24,587	63.5	+6.8
Independent	Tracee Hutchison	14,143	36.5	+36.5
Liberal hold				

==== 2022 ====
2022 Victorian state election: Nepean
Party	Candidate	Votes	%	±%
Liberal	Sam Groth	19,614	48.1	+4.0
Labor	Chris Brayne	13,308	32.6	−5.3
Greens	Esther Gleixner	3,576	8.8	−2.2
Freedom	Hank Leine	980	2.4	+2.4
Animal Justice	Pamela Engelander	720	1.8	+1.8
Family First	Janny Dijkman	638	1.6	+1.6
Companions and Pets	Jay Miller	526	1.3	+1.3
Independent	Elizabeth Woolcock	495	1.2	+1.2
Independent	Charelle Ainslie	449	1.1	+1.1
Democratic Labour	Cynthia Skruzny	369	0.9	+0.9
Independent	Steve Anger	91	0.2	+0.2
Total formal votes		40,766	93.7	−0.9
Informal votes		2,753	6.3	+0.9
Turnout		43,519	88.9	+3.9
Two-party-preferred result
Liberal	Sam Groth	22,986	56.4	+7.1
Labor	Chris Brayne	17,780	43.6	−7.1
Liberal gain from Labor		Swing	+7.1	

=== Elections in the 2010s ===
==== 2018 ====
2018 Victorian state election: Nepean
Party	Candidate	Votes	%	±%
Liberal	Russell Joseph	18,570	43.9	−9.4
Labor	Chris Brayne	15,835	37.5	+6.3
Greens	Paul Saunders	5,080	12.0	+0.2
Independent	Simon Mulvany	1,776	4.2	+4.2
Independent	Rodger Gully	996	2.4	+2.4
Total formal votes		42,257	94.7	−0.3
Informal votes		2,353	5.3	+0.3
Turnout		44,610	89.8	−2.9
Two-party-preferred result
Labor	Chris Brayne	21,512	50.9	+8.5
Liberal	Russell Joseph	20,745	49.1	−8.5
Labor gain from Liberal		Swing	+8.5	

==== 2014 ====
2014 Victorian state election: Nepean
Party	Candidate	Votes	%	±%
Liberal	Martin Dixon	20,984	53.3	−5.5
Labor	Carolyn Gleixner	12,253	31.1	+4.3
Greens	Craig Thomson	4,658	11.8	−0.9
Country Alliance	Matthew Schmidt	655	1.7	+0.3
Rise Up Australia	Laura Yue	460	1.2	+1.2
Independent	David J. Stanton	339	0.9	+0.9
Total formal votes		39,349	95.0	−0.8
Informal votes		2,056	5.0	+0.8
Turnout		41,405	92.7	+0.1
Two-party-preferred result
Liberal	Martin Dixon	22,694	57.6	−6.1
Labor	Carolyn Gleixner	16,684	42.4	+6.1
Liberal hold		Swing	−6.1	

==== 2010 ====
2010 Victorian state election: Nepean
Party	Candidate	Votes	%	±%
Liberal	Martin Dixon	20,700	59.74	+5.15
Labor	John Lannan	9,333	26.94	−4.95
Greens	Anton Vigenser	4,176	12.05	+1.22
Country Alliance	Keith Lyon	439	1.27	+1.27
Total formal votes		34,648	95.87	+0.32
Informal votes		1,494	4.13	−0.32
Turnout		36,142	92.55	−0.32
Two-party-preferred result
Liberal	Martin Dixon	22,288	64.31	+4.93
Labor	John Lannan	12,370	35.69	−4.93
Liberal hold		Swing	+4.93	

=== Elections in the 2000s ===
==== 2006 ====
2006 Victorian state election: Nepean
Party	Candidate	Votes	%	±%
Liberal	Martin Dixon	17,658	54.6	+7.4
Labor	Anne Marshall	10,315	31.9	−9.5
Greens	Henry Kelsall	3,502	10.8	−0.5
Family First	Craig Nelson	872	2.7	+2.7
Total formal votes		32,347	95.6	−1.5
Informal votes		1,506	4.4	+1.5
Turnout		33,853	92.9	
Two-party-preferred result
Liberal	Martin Dixon	19,203	59.4	+9.2
Labor	Anne Marshall	13,138	40.6	−9.2
Liberal hold		Swing	+9.2	

==== 2002 ====
2002 Victorian state election: Nepean
Party	Candidate	Votes	%	±%
Liberal	Martin Dixon	15,543	47.2	−7.2
Labor	Carole Ford	13,636	41.4	+0.2
Greens	David De Rango	3,733	11.3	+11.3
Total formal votes		32,912	97.0	−0.6
Informal votes		1,010	3.0	+0.6
Turnout		33,922	93.8	
Two-party-preferred result
Liberal	Martin Dixon	16,513	50.2	−6.0
Labor	Carole Ford	16,399	49.8	+6.0
Liberal hold		Swing	−6.0	
