= Electoral district of Nepean =

State electoral district of Victoria, Australia

Nepean Victoria—Legislative Assembly
- Interactive map of electoral district boundaries from the 2022 state election
- State: Victoria
- Created: 2002
- MP: Anthony Marsh
- Party: Liberal Party
- Namesake: Point Nepean
- Electors: 49,653 (2018)
- Area: 387 km^{2} (149.4 sq mi)
- Demographic: Mixed rural and urban
Electorates around Nepean:
| Port Phillip | Mornington | Hastings |
| | Nepean |
| Bass Strait | Bass Strait | Bass Strait |

The electoral district of Nepean is an electorate of the Victorian Legislative Assembly covering the southernmost part of the Mornington Peninsula in Victoria, Australia. It is named after Point Nepean which is contained within the electorate.

The seat was created prior to the 2002 Victorian state election as a replacement for Dromana. Like its predecessor, historically it had been a relatively safe seat for the Liberal Party, although Labor came within 0.2% of winning it in 2002. In 2018, however, it was swept up in the massive Labor wave that swept through eastern Melbourne, with Chris Brayne succeeding retiring longtime Liberal incumbent and former minister Martin Dixon. Brayne is only the second Labor member ever to win the seat in either of its incarnations.

Brayne was defeated in 2022 by former tennis player Sam Groth. In turn, Groth resigned from the seat in February 2026, just nine months out from the 2026 Victorian state election, triggering the 2026 Nepean state by-election.

The seat has the oldest median age of any electorate in the state.

== Members for Nepean ==
| Member | Party | Term |
|---|---|---|
| Martin Dixon | Liberal | 2002–2018 |
| Chris Brayne | Labor | 2018–2022 |
| Sam Groth | Liberal | 2022–2026 |
| Anthony Marsh | Liberal | 2026–present |

== Election results ==
2026 Nepean state by-election
| Party | Candidate | Votes | % | ±% |
|---|---|---|---|---|
| Liberal | Anthony Marsh | 14,927 | 38.5 | −9.6 |
| One Nation | Darren Hercus | 9,556 | 24.7 | +24.7 |
| Independent | Tracee Hutchison | 8,239 | 21.3 | +21.3 |
| Greens | Sianan Healy | 3,597 | 9.3 | +0.5 |
| Legalise Cannabis | Renee Thompson | 1,126 | 2.9 | +2.9 |
| Sustainable Australia | Reade Smith | 668 | 1.7 | +1.7 |
| Libertarian | Peter Angelico | 475 | 1.2 | +1.2 |
| EMI – Reform | Milton Wilde | 157 | 0.4 | −0.9 (Note: Change calculated from the party's prior performance as the Companions and Pets Party.) |
| Total formal votes | | 38,745 | 95.4 | +1.7 |
| Informal votes | | 1,867 | 4.6 | −1.7 |
| Turnout | | 40,612 | 79.8 | |
| Registered electors | | 50,910 | | |
Two-candidate-preferred result
| Liberal | Anthony Marsh | 24,587 | 63.5 | +6.8 |
| Independent | Tracee Hutchison | 14,143 | 36.5 | +36.5 |
| Liberal hold | | | | |
