= 2026 Nepean state by-election =

- 2 May 2026

Electoral district of Nepean in the Victorian Legislative Assembly
- Registered: 50,910
- Turnout: 83.6% (▼5.3 pp)
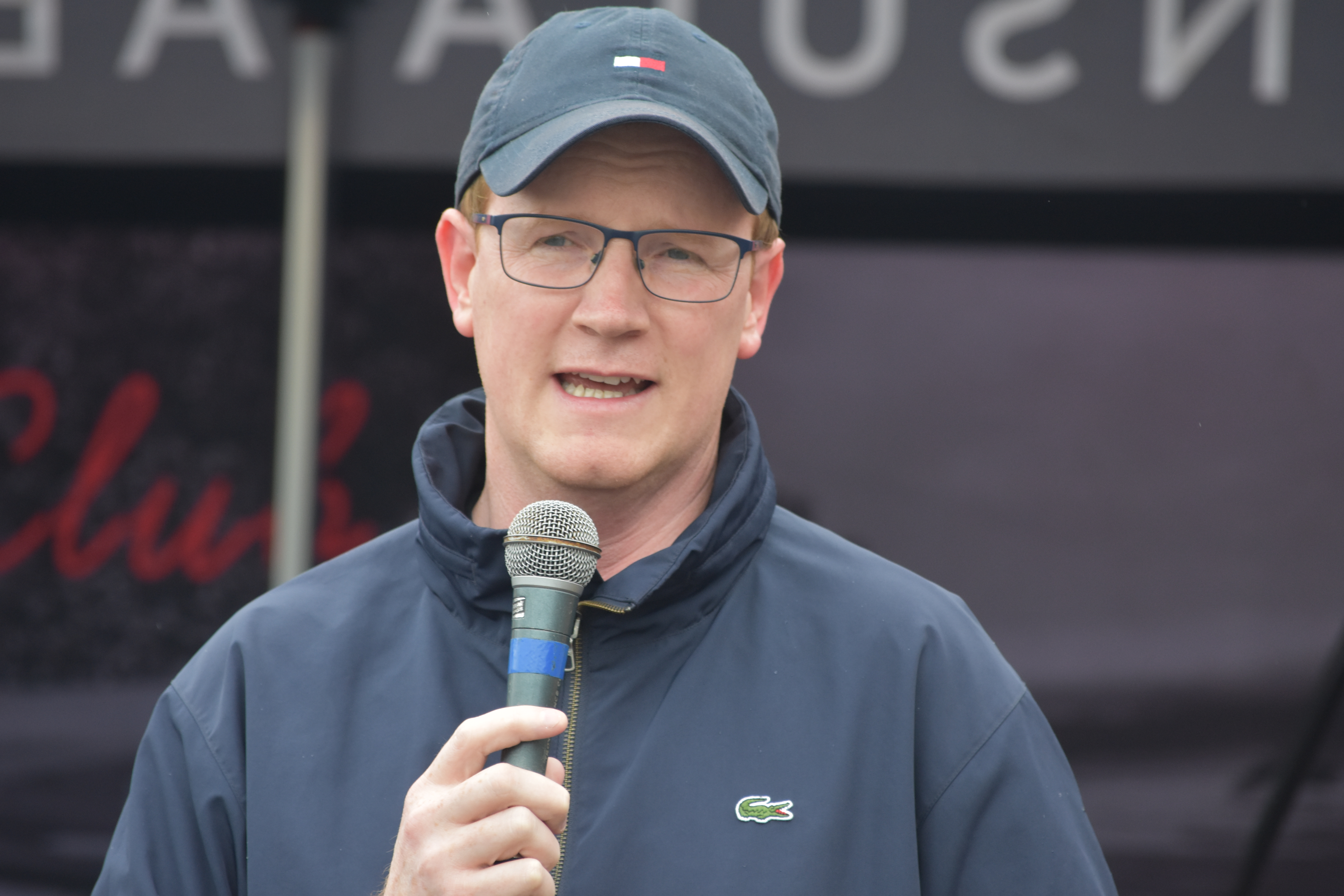

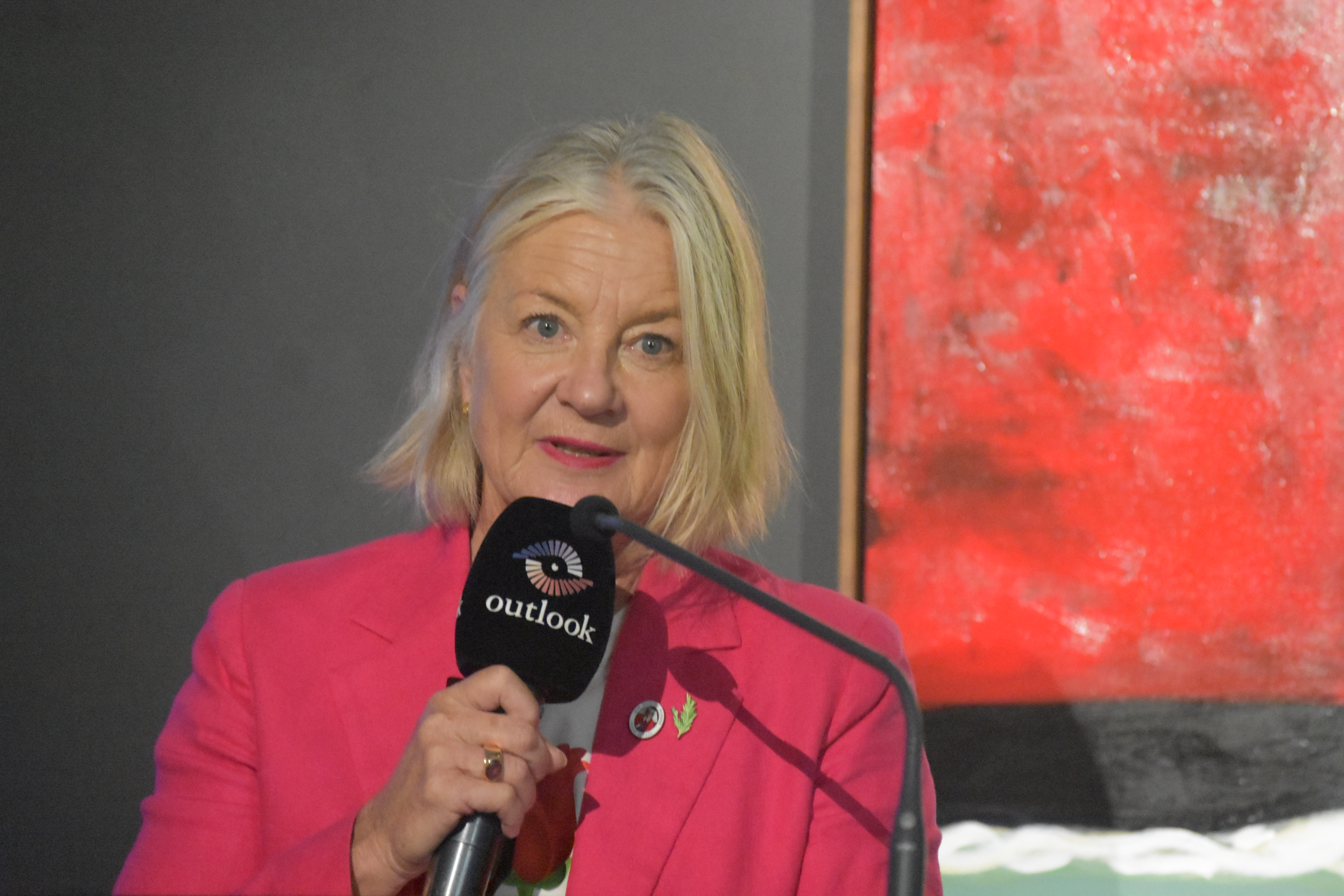

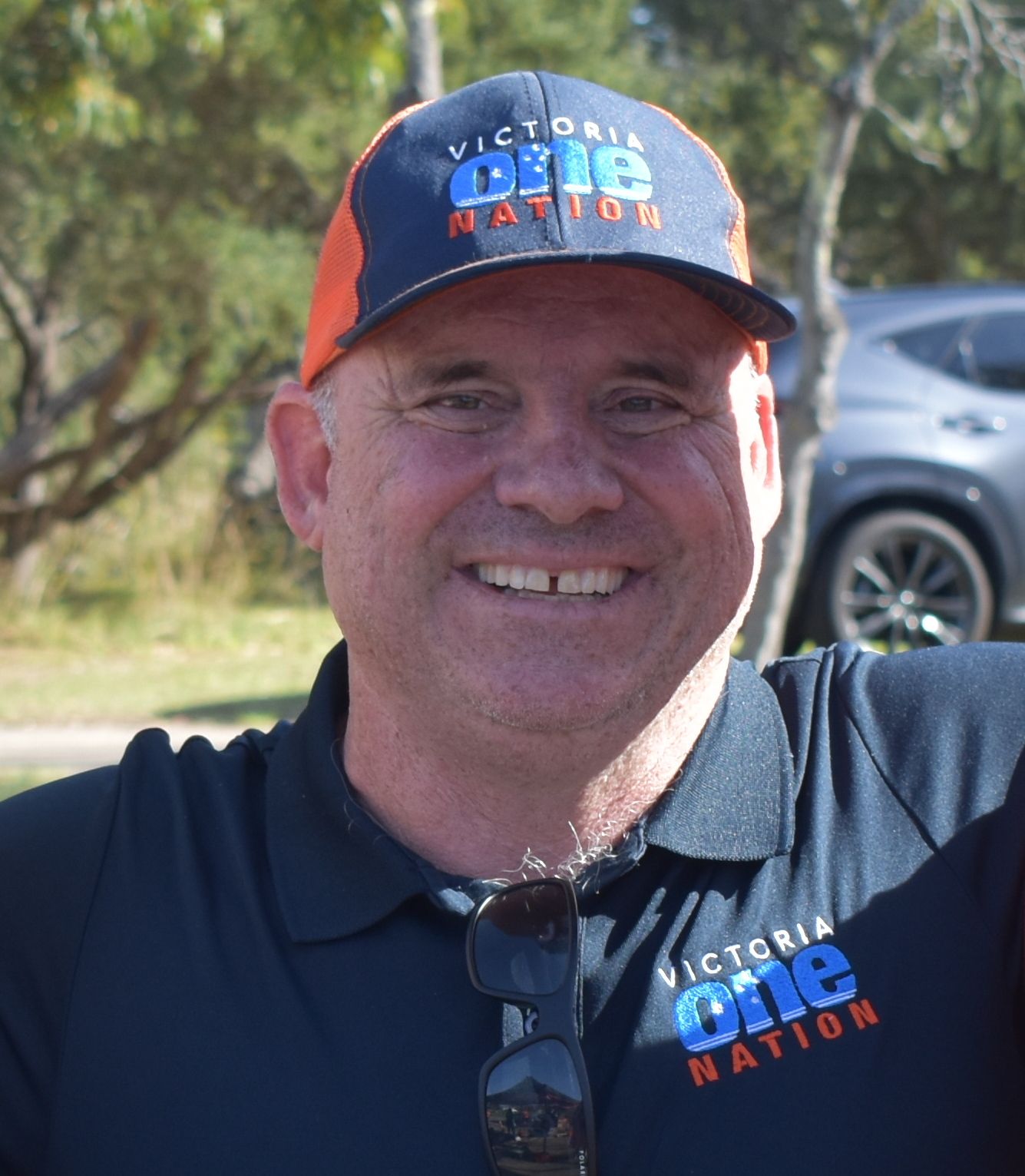
	First party	Second party	Third party
Candidate	Anthony Marsh	Tracee Hutchison	Darren Hercus
Party	Liberal	Independent	One Nation
Primary vote	15,682	8,533	9,941
Percentage	38.7%	21.0%	24.5%
Swing	▼9.4 pp	▲21.0 pp	▲24.5 pp
2CP	63.2%	36.8%
2CP swing	▲6.9 pp	▲36.8 pp
- Interactive map of the Nepean district
MP before election
Sam Groth
Liberal
Elected MP
Anthony Marsh
Liberal

A by-election was held on 2 May 2026 to elect the member of parliament for the district of Nepean in the Victorian Legislative Assembly. The election was triggered by the resignation of Sam Groth, a Liberal MP first elected at the 2022 state election.

Eight candidates contested the by-election. The Liberal Party preselected Anthony Marsh, mayor of Mornington Peninsula Shire, while One Nation chose small business owner Darren Hercus as their candidate, and broadcaster Tracee Hutchison stood as an independent candidate. The Labor Party did not contest.

Marsh won the by-election, as per usual in a seat normally considered safe for the Liberal Party. Despite a decrease in the party's primary vote, Marsh's margin increased following the distribution of preferences, where he received 63 per cent of the vote on the final count. Following a strong performance for One Nation in South Australia, Hercus placed second with 24.5 per cent of the primary vote, polling best in working-class areas such as Dromana and Rosebud. However, in the distribution of preferences, he fell behind Hutchison. Hutchison had received 21 per cent of the primary vote but overtook Hercus after preferences of the voters for the Greens candidate, Sianan Healy, were distributed.

== Background ==
The electoral district of Nepean, formerly known as Dromana, covers the southernmost end of the Mornington Peninsula, from Safety Beach to Portsea. Usually considered a safe Liberal seat, Nepean was won by Labor for only the second time in its history (Note: The electoral district of Nepean was first contested at the 2002 Victorian state election, but had existed in much the same form as the electoral district of Dromana since 1967. Labor had won Dromana once in its history — at the 1982 state election, when the government of John Cain was first elected.) at the 2018 Victorian state election, when Chris Brayne won the seat. As of the 2021 census, the electorate of Nepean was older, less ethnically diverse, and poorer than the state average. Following a boundary redistribution, Nepean had a notional margin of 0.7 percent for Labor. However, Liberal candidate Sam Groth defeated Brayne at the 2022 Victorian state election, with a swing of 7.1 percent towards the Liberal Party. Groth was a former professional tennis player, subsequently a sports commentator, and had lived in Rye for a number of years prior to the 2022 election. The Liberals performed strongly in wealthier communities, receiving over two-thirds of the two-party-preferred vote in the Portsea and Sorrento polling booths, while Labor performed better in the towns of Dromana, Rosebud, and McCrae, which are less well-off.

At the 2025 federal election, the Liberal-held Division of Flinders had a competitive performance from independent Ben Smith, who polled 47.7 per cent of the two-candidate-preferred vote. Smith carried most polling booths in the western portion of Flinders, which overlaps with the state Nepean district.

On 5 January 2026, Groth announced that he would not seek re-election at the upcoming 2026 Victorian state election, citing "public pressure placed on my family", some of which he stated had come from within the Liberal Party. Groth had previously sued The Herald and Weekly Times publishing company for defamation, over their newspapers' fostering the allegation that he had started a relationship with his wife before she had reached the age of consent. The Herald Sun apologised for these claims in late 2025, and lawyers for both Groth and his wife have stated that the allegation is false. On 4 February, the office of Victorian Liberal Party leader Jess Wilson confirmed that Groth intended to resign from the Victorian Parliament, triggering a by-election in the electoral district of Nepean. Groth resigned from parliament on 13 February 2026.

The by-election was held in close proximity to the Victorian state election, which was scheduled for November 2026. It was also preceded by the 2026 South Australian state election, held six weeks prior, at which One Nation polled 23 per cent of the statewide primary vote. Alongside the Farrer by-election, held a week later, the Nepean by-election was considered a test for One Nation's electoral prospects across Australia, and specifically in advance of the Victorian state election. The by-election was also the first contested by the Liberal Party under the leadership of Wilson.

=== Previous result ===
2022 Victorian state election: Nepean
Party	Candidate	Votes	%	±%
Liberal	Sam Groth	19,614	48.1	+4.0
Labor	Chris Brayne	13,308	32.6	−5.3
Greens	Esther Gleixner	3,576	8.8	−2.2
Freedom	Hank Leine	980	2.4	+2.4
Animal Justice	Pamela Engelander	720	1.8	+1.8
Family First	Janny Dijkman	638	1.6	+1.6
Companions and Pets	Jay Miller	526	1.3	+1.3
Independent	Elizabeth Woolcock	495	1.2	+1.2
Independent	Charelle Ainslie	449	1.1	+1.1
Democratic Labour	Cynthia Skruzny	369	0.9	+0.9
Independent	Steve Anger	91	0.2	+0.2
Total formal votes		40,766	93.7	−0.9
Informal votes		2,753	6.3	+0.9
Turnout		43,519	88.9	+3.9
Two-party-preferred result
Liberal	Sam Groth	22,986	56.4	+7.1
Labor	Chris Brayne	17,780	43.6	−7.1
Liberal gain from Labor		Swing	+7.1	

== Key dates ==
Sam Groth resigned from Parliament on 13 February 2026, with the writ issued by the Speaker on 13 March. The timeline for the by-election is as follows:

- Friday 13 March − Speaker issues writ
- Monday 16 March − Candidate nominations open
- Friday 20 March, 8pm − Electoral roll closes
- Thursday 9 April, 12pm − Candidate nominations close for registered party candidates
- Friday 10 April, 12pm − Candidate nominations close for independent candidates
- Wednesday 22 April − Early voting begins
- Saturday 2 May − Election day
- Friday 8 May − Last day for votes to be admitted to count
- On or before Saturday 23 May − Return of the writ

On 21 April, the day before early voting began, a low-sensory voting space was open from 10am to 4pm, to provide a low-stimuli environment for neurodivergent voters.

== Candidates ==
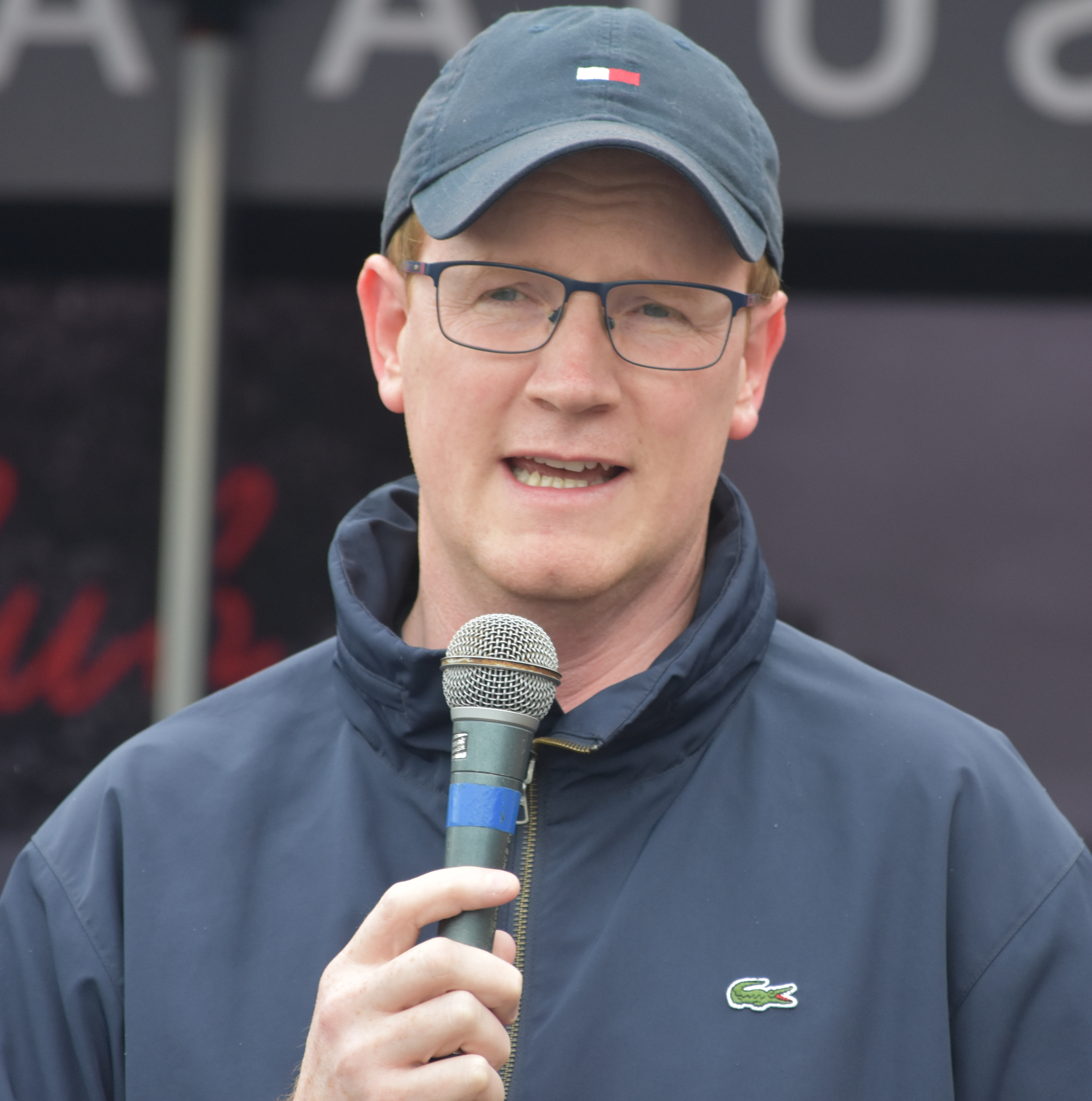
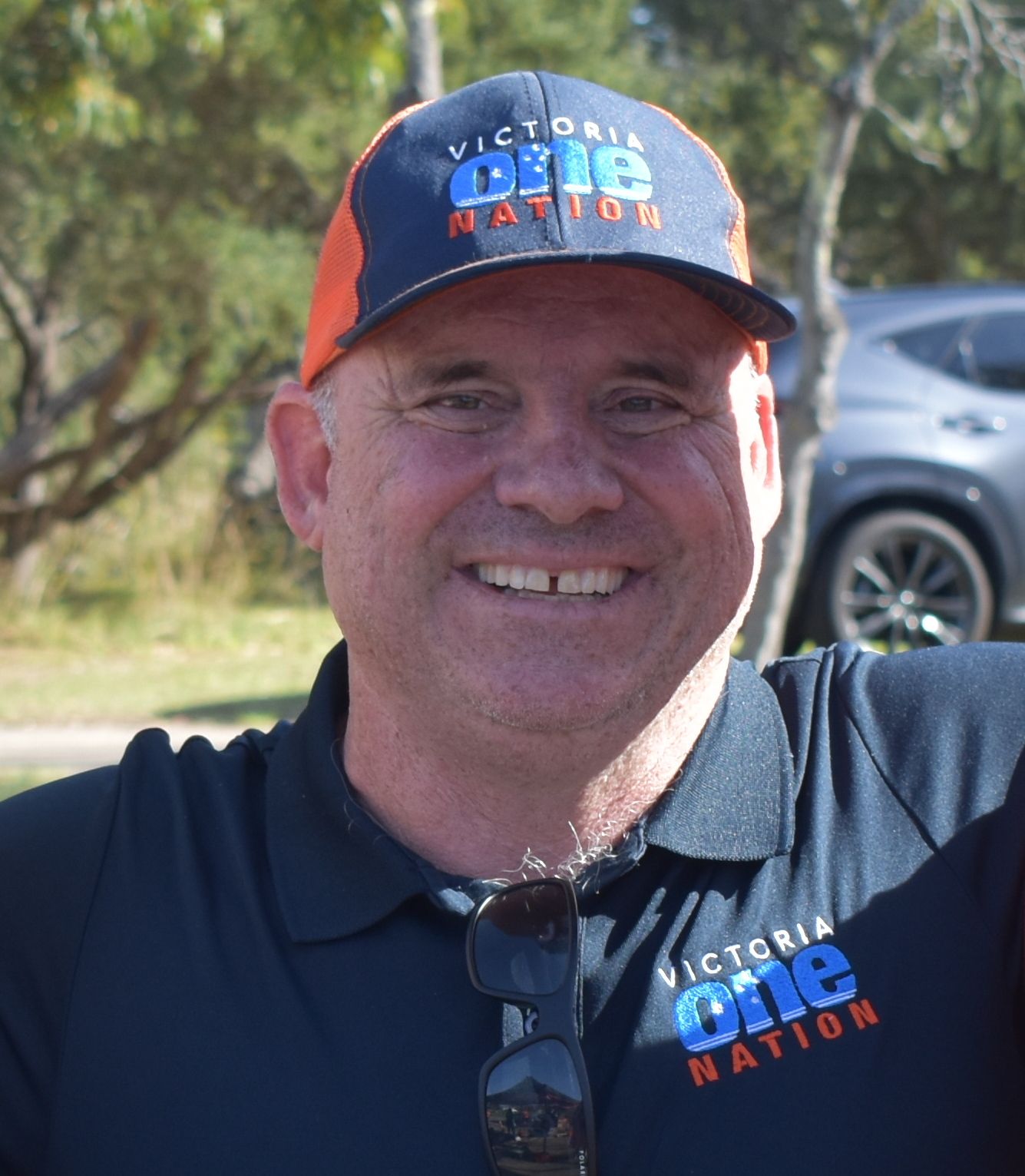
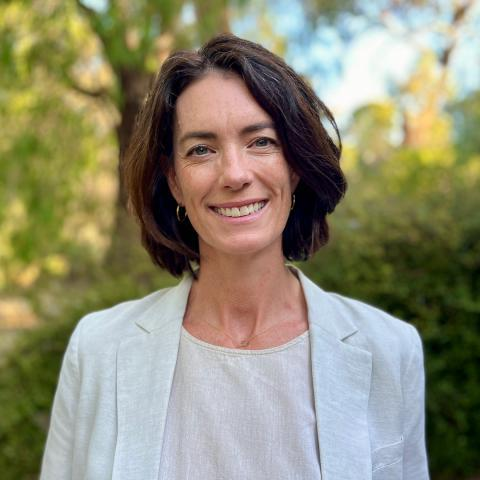
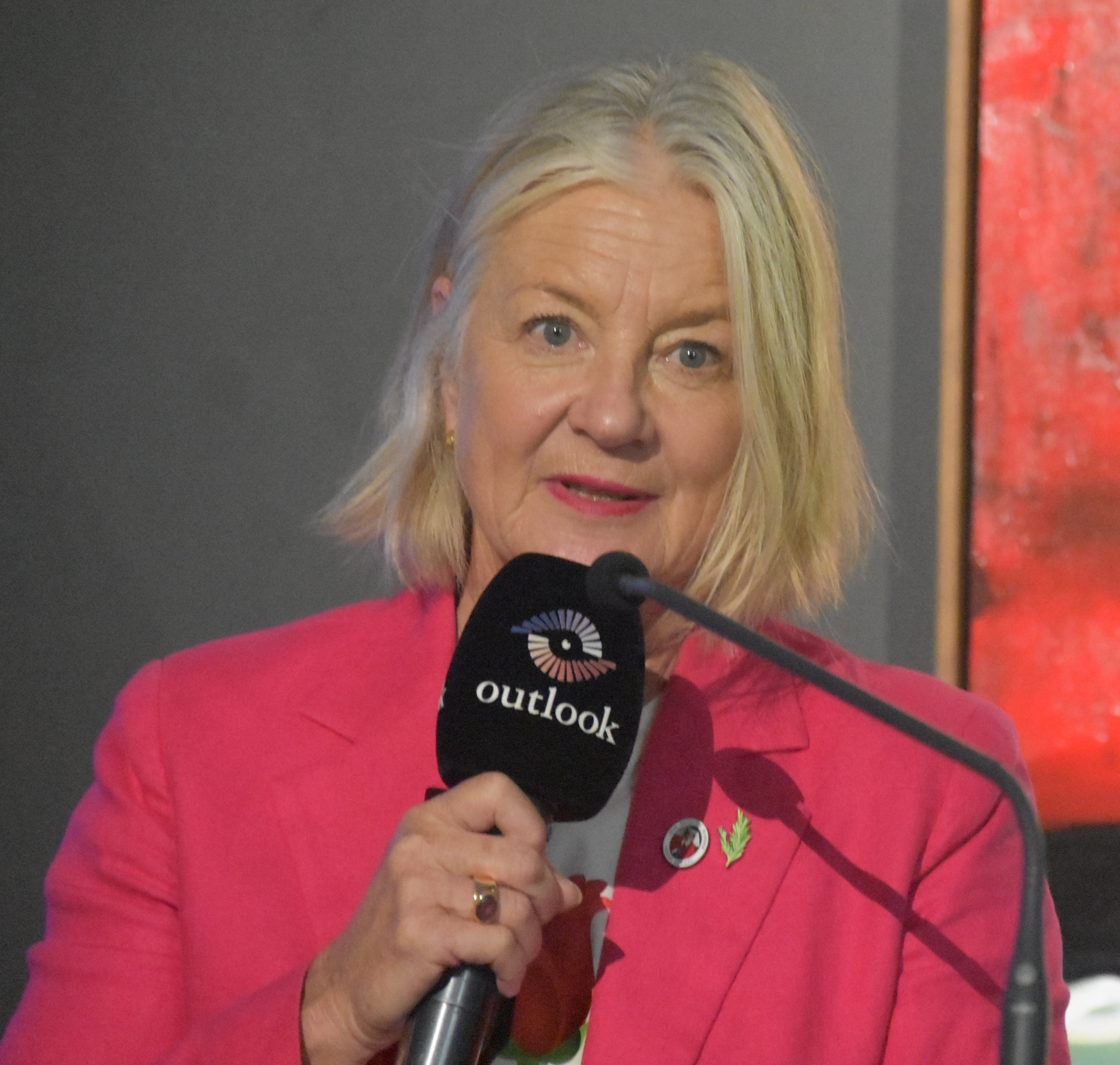
Candidates in the Nepean by-election. From left-to-right, then top-to-bottom: Anthony Marsh (Liberal), Darren Hercus (One Nation), Sianan Healy (Greens), and Tracee Hutchison (Independent).

Candidates are listed below in ballot paper order:

Party	Candidate	Background
One Nation	Darren Hercus	Small business owner
Sustainable Australia	Reade Smith	Former mayor of Mornington Peninsula Shire
Greens	Sianan Healy	Women's health researcher
Liberal	Anthony Marsh	Mayor of Mornington Peninsula Shire
EMI – Reform	Milton Wilde	Former police officer, candidate at 2025 federal election
Libertarian	Peter Angelico	Entrepreneur and former Liberal Party member
Independent	Tracee Hutchison	Broadcaster and journalist
Legalise Cannabis	Renee Thompson	

According to The Guardian, The Age, and the Mornington Peninsula News Group, five candidates were nominated for Liberal Party preselection. These were Anthony Marsh, David Burgess, Briony Camp, Nathan Conroy, and Bree Ambry. Marsh, the mayor of Mornington Peninsula Shire, was given special permission by the Liberal Party state executive to stand as a candidate, as he had only joined the party on 10 February 2026. Burgess, Camp, and Conroy had previously unsuccessfully stood for the Liberal Party in general elections—Burgess for the Legislative Council, Camp in the district of Hastings, and Conroy twice for the federal division of Dunkley. Ambry is a project manager with Nepean Health. The Liberal candidate for the by-election was decided by a combined vote of the eighteen members of the state executive and six members of the branch executive in Nepean, rather than by a vote of rank-and-file branch members. Marsh was the successful candidate, being preselected on 24 February 2026. According to Mornington Peninsula News Group, in the first round of preselection voting, Marsh received ten votes, Camp four, Conroy three, and Burgess two.

The Labor Party did not stand a candidate in the by-election.

Darren Hercus, who owns a fabrication company in Safety Beach, was announced as the One Nation candidate on 1 March. According to two former members of One Nation, Hercus was selected directly by Warren Pickering, the state president of One Nation. Hercus states that he was chosen by a vote of the membership.

Tracee Hutchison, a broadcaster and journalist from Rosebud, announced her candidacy for the by-election on 8 March as an independent. Hutchison was endorsed by the Independents for Mornington Peninsula group. Hutchison has opposed cuts by the Mornington Peninsula shire to programs relating to the arts, cultural heritage, and First Nations people, as well as the council's rescinding of a climate emergency declaration.

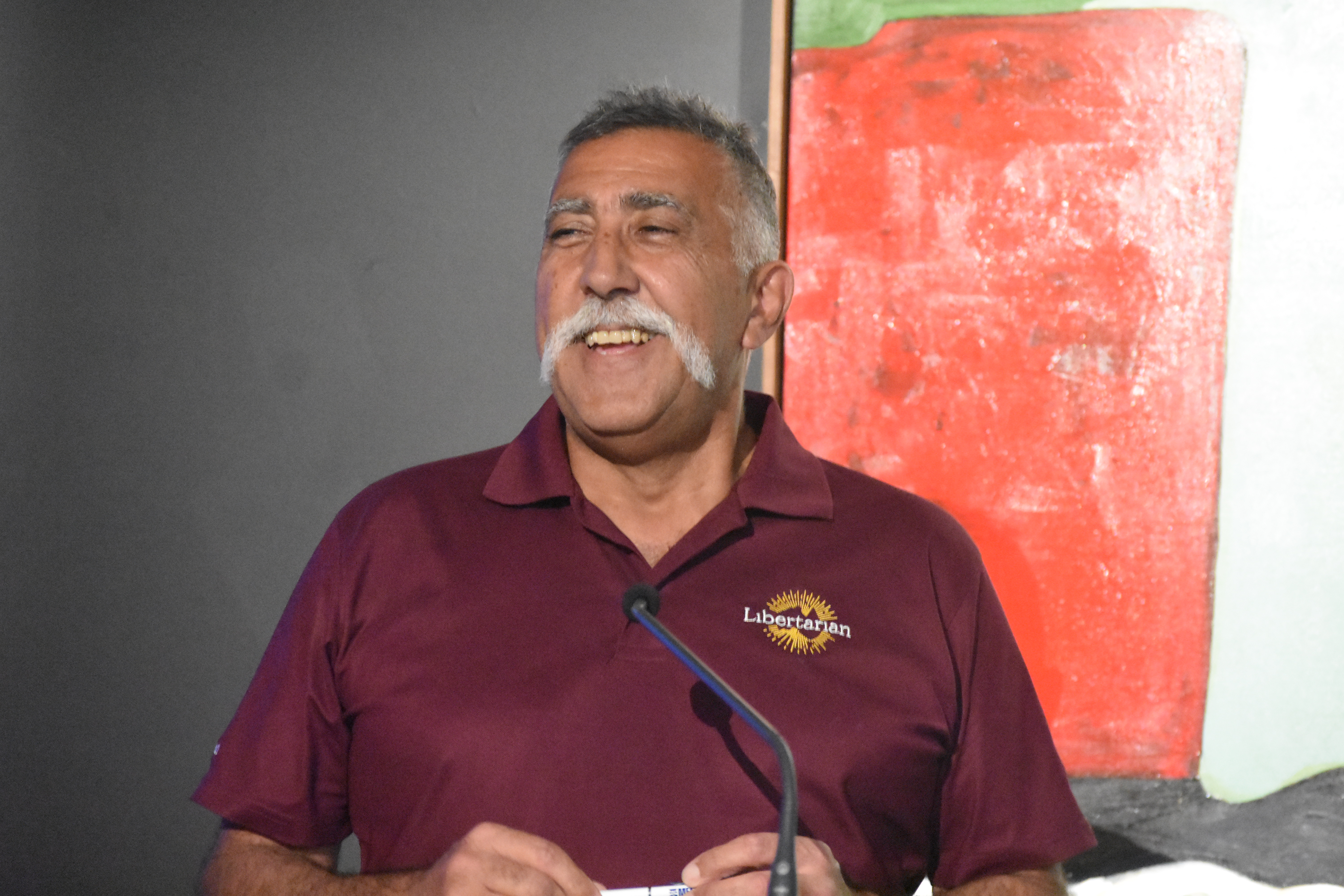
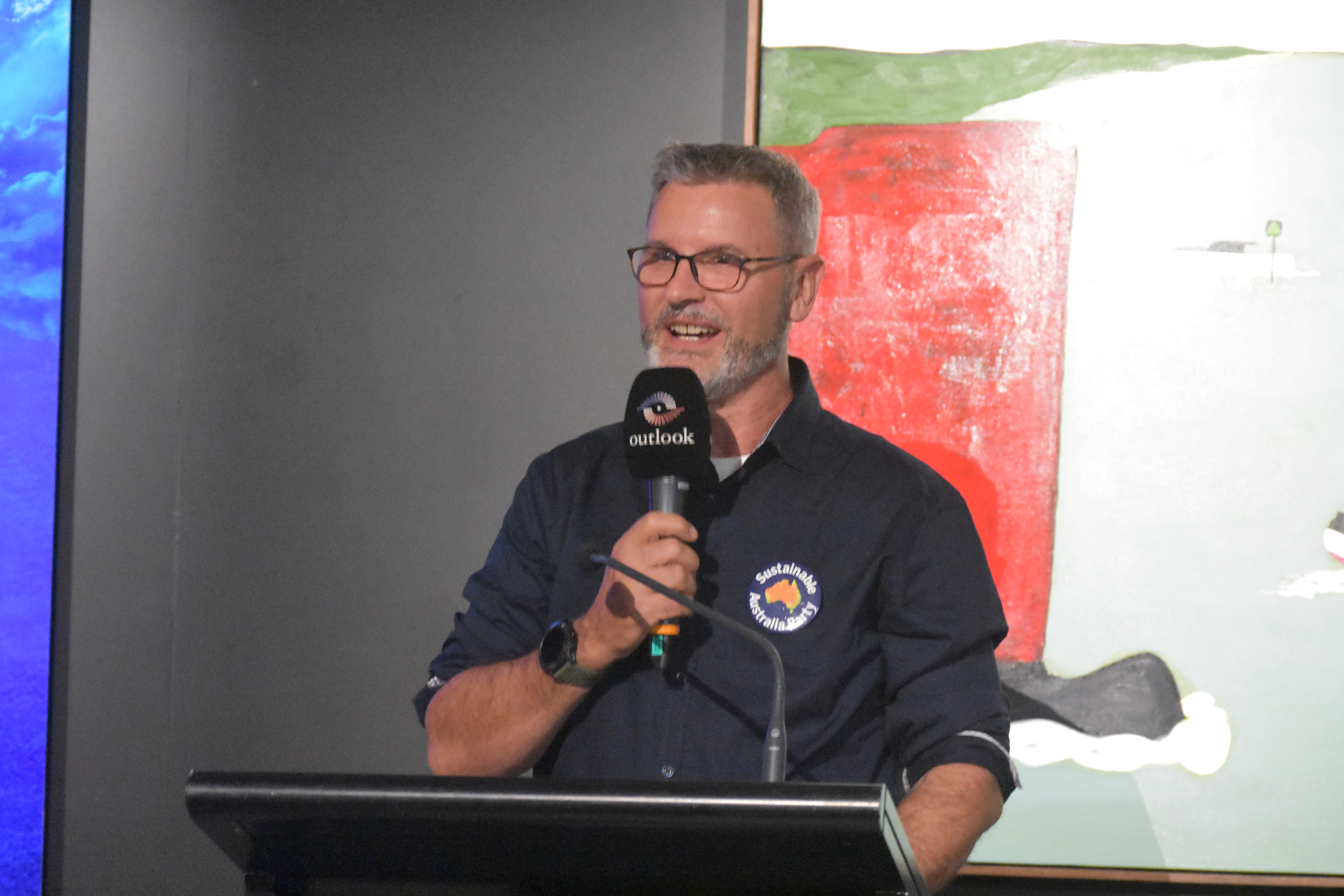
Peter Angelico (left) and Reade Smith (right) represented the minor Libertarian and Sustainable Australia parties at the by-election.

The Greens candidate for Nepean was Sianan Healy, a women's health researcher.

Peter Angelico, an entrepreneur and former Liberal Party member of two decades, was the endorsed Libertarian Party candidate for Nepean.

Reade Smith, a former councillor and mayor at Mornington Peninsula Shire, was the candidate for Affordable Housing Now – Sustainable Australia Party. Smith was a councillor from 2000 to 2012, and mayor in 2005.

End Mass Immigration – Reform AU stood Milton Wilde, a Croydon-based former police officer. Wilde previously stood at the 2025 federal election for the Trumpet of Patriots party.

Renee Thompson was the candidate for the Legalise Cannabis Party.

== Campaign ==
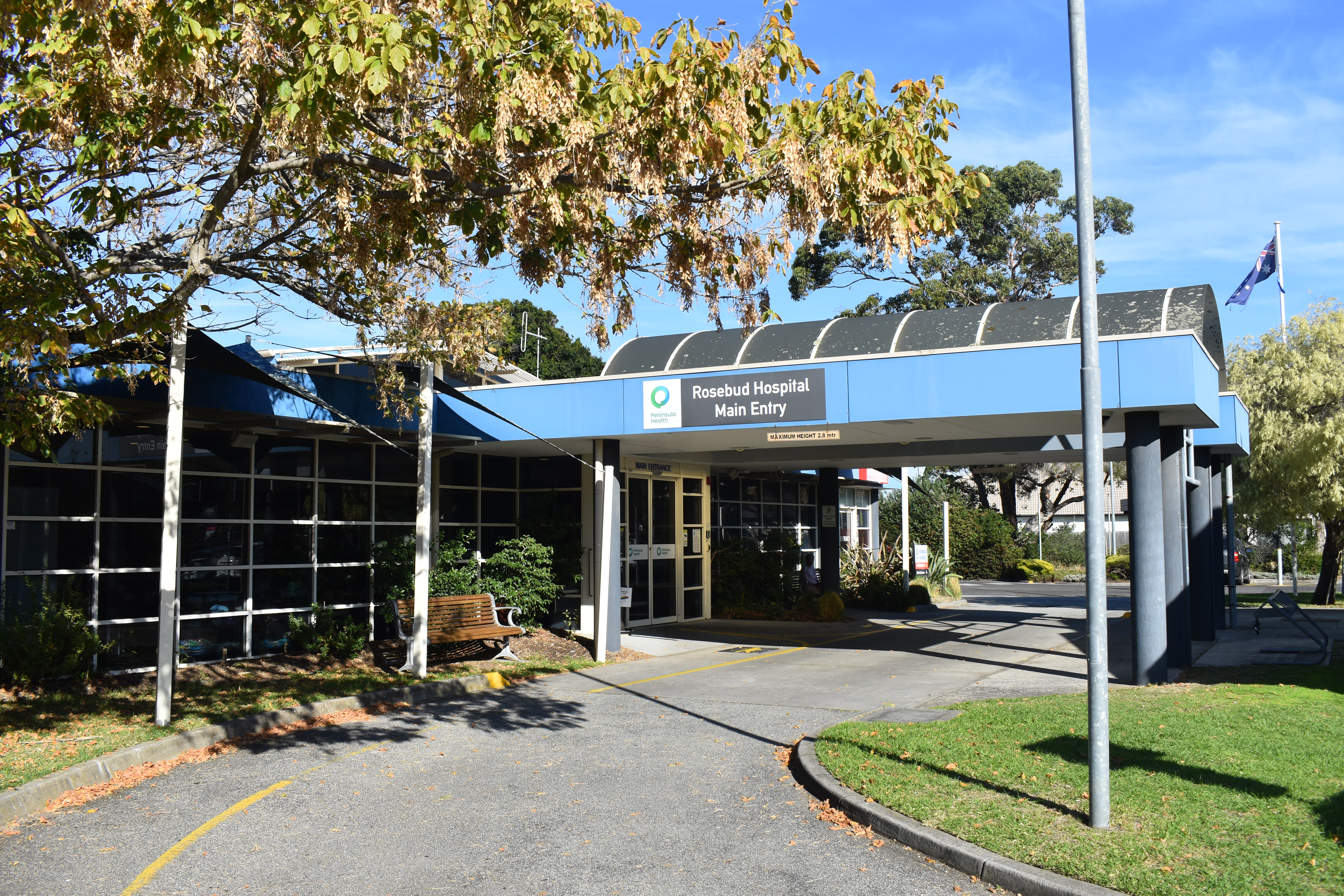
Rosebud Hospital in 2026.

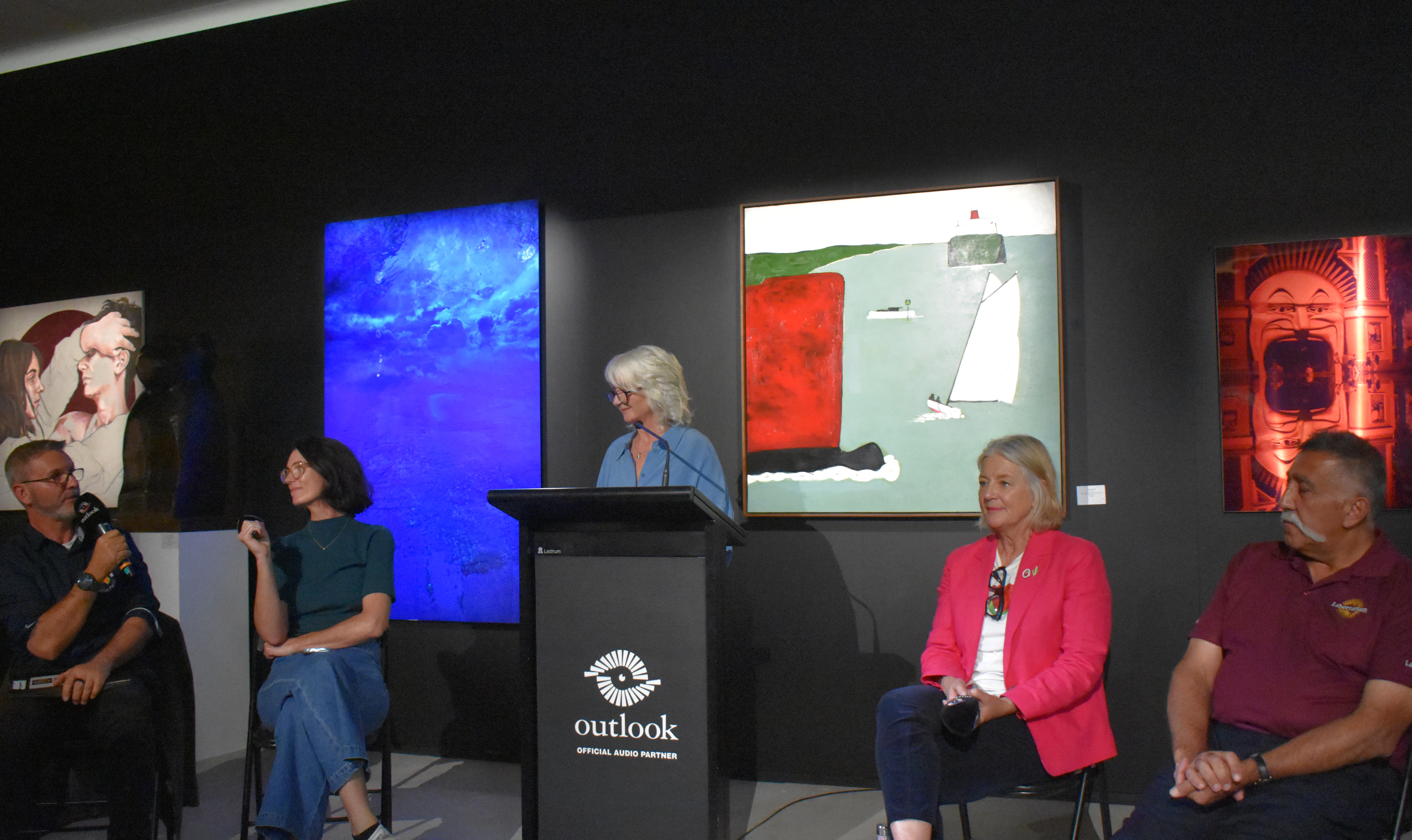
The candidates' debate (from left-to-right: Smith, Healy, Hutchison, Angelico).

Throughout the campaign, the Liberal Party positioned its candidate Anthony Marsh as focused on local issues, and argued that the party was more likely to form government than any opponents.

Marsh and Liberal party leader Jess Wilson announced on 14 March that the party would spend $340 million on rebuilding the Rosebud Hospital if elected to government, reiterating a promise made by Sam Groth at the 2022 state election. Both One Nation and Hutchison also expressed their support for a rebuild of the hospital, with One Nation supporting a public–private partnership to fund construction works.

Sianan Healy, the Greens candidate, launched her campaign for the by-election in Blairgowrie on 29 March.

Two sets of leaflets authorised by the Liberal Party were distributed in early April, the first arguing that One Nation was inexperienced and untested, and the second describing independent Tracee Hutchison as "Jacinta Allan's Secret Nepean Candidate", citing Hutchison's interest in standing for the Labor Party at the 2019 federal election, as well as her criticism of Australia Day and the Australian flag. Hercus, the One Nation candidate, described the leaflet directed at his party as an "act of desperation", while Hutchison stated the material directed against her was "lazy and dishonest".

The High Court of Australia's ruling in Hopper v Victoria, announced on 15 April, struck down a large portion of Victoria's laws governing political donations. While political leaders in the state, including premier Allan and shadow attorney-general James Newbury, immediately called for reforms to introduce regulations regarding political donations within the limits of the court's ruling, the Victorian Parliament was not scheduled to sit before 5 May. A legislative proposal on Victoria's political donation laws was put forward by the Allan government on 2 June, a month after the Nepean by-election.

The Age reported on 18 April that Hercus had been told by Pickering to use a personal bank account for accepting campaign donations. Hercus stated to the paper that he did not use a personal account for political expenses and had no knowledge of how his donations were being managed. If Hercus had used a personal account to accept donations, it would have violated Victorian campaign expenditure laws in place prior to Hopper v Victoria. In a press conference on the same day, federal leader Pauline Hanson referred to the report as "false allegations". On 19 April, ABC News reported that Marsh was being investigated for unauthorised roadworks, following the release of a campaign video where he, with Wilson, had filled a Dromana pothole to highlight a lack of funding for road repairs. An internal committee within One Nation that had been tasked with running the party's Nepean campaign had dissolved by late April, with three of its seven members leaving the party.

The sole candidates' debate for the by-election was held on 23 April. Hutchison, Healy, Angelico, and Smith attended. Both Hercus and Marsh had been slated to attend, but Hercus withdrew on 20 April, citing campaign commitments. Marsh chose not to attend as a result of Hercus's withdrawal.

Wilson campaigned heavily in the Nepean district in the lead up to the by-election. She was present at pre-polling booths for most days of early voting to hand out how-to-vote cards for the party. In the final days of the Nepean campaign, she campaigned specifically on repealing Victoria's Treaty with Indigenous peoples. Hanson also visited Nepean during the campaign, holding an event that received attention in the media.

== How-to-vote cards ==
The Liberal Party and One Nation both listed each other as third preferences on their how-to-vote cards, preceded by the Libertarian Party as second preference.

The Libertarian Party preferenced One Nation second and Liberal third, with Hutchison last. End Mass Immigration – Reform AU did not register a how-to-vote card with the Victorian Electoral Commission.

Hutchison, Legalise Cannabis, and Sustainable Australia issued open how-to-vote cards with no preference recommendations. The Greens recommended a second preference for Hutchison and a fourth preference for the Liberal Party.

== Results ==
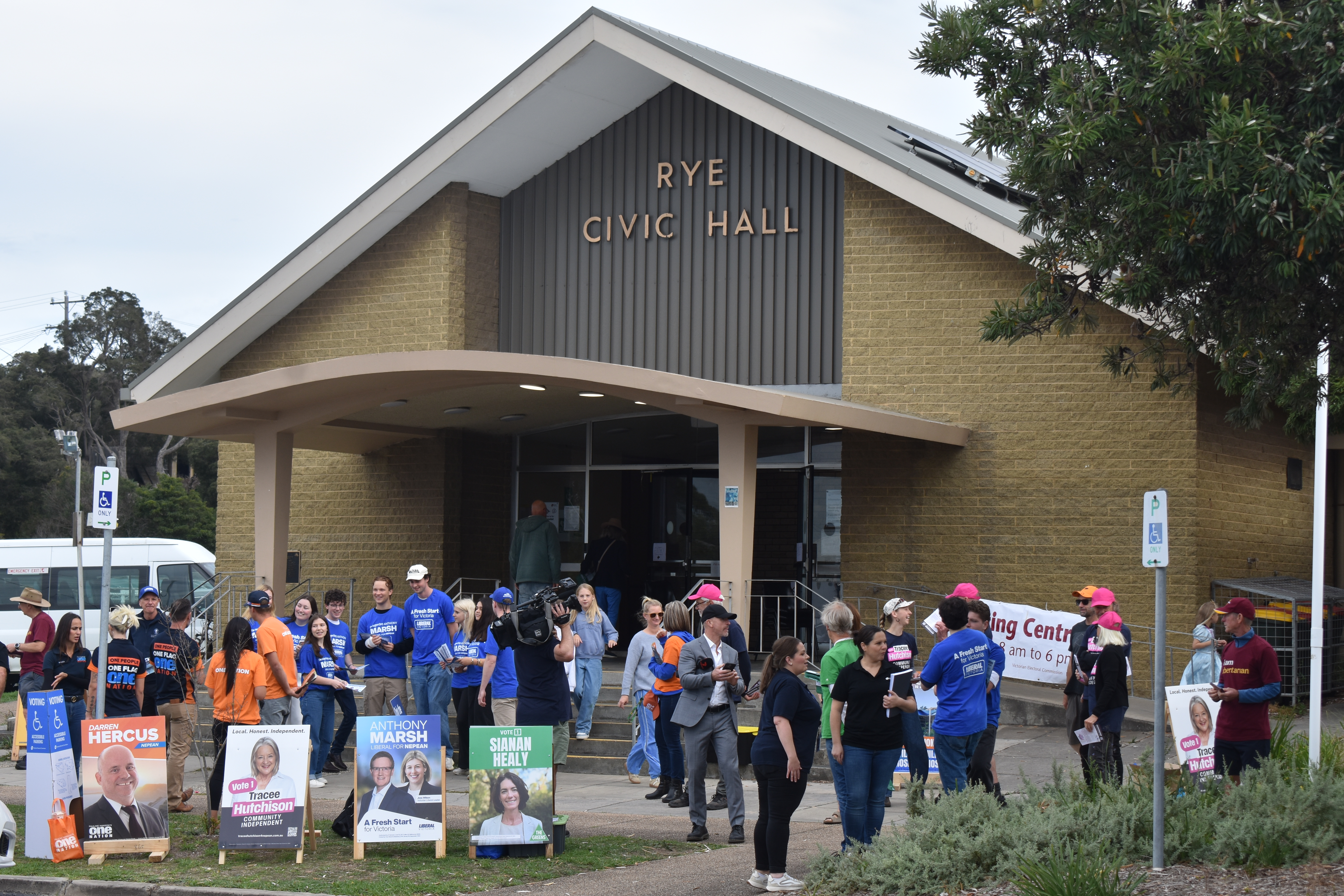
Election day polling booth in Rye.

Over half of the registered voters in Nepean cast their ballot before election day, through either early or postal voting. Less than three hours after polls closed, Australian Broadcasting Corporation electoral analyst Casey Briggs called the by-election for Liberal candidate Anthony Marsh.

The Liberal Party declared victory in the seat on election night. Marsh described his election as "the honour of my life", and Wilson pledged to fight for local residents and to work "to earn the trust of Victorians". In their own post-election speeches, Hercus and Hutchison both pledged to run again in the November state election. Hercus stated that he had "stuck to the moral high ground" in the campaign, saying that the Liberal Party had incorrectly accused One Nation of seeking to privatise Rosebud Hospital. Hutchison expressed pride in her campaign, which she described as local and people-powered. She stated on 20 May that she would not run at the state election in November. Hutchison cited gendered abuse as contributing to her decision not to stand again, saying that she had experienced "a sustained, organised harassment and bullying campaign" during the by-election.

Bar chart showing the distribution of preferences in the Nepean by-election.

Marsh led on first preferences, and held this lead throughout the count. While Hercus placed second on primary votes, third-placed Hutchison overtook him following the distribution of Greens voters' preferences, which flowed 70 per cent to her, 21 per cent to Marsh, and 9 per cent to Hercus. One Nation preferences flowed strongly to the Liberal Party, with 77.5 per cent going to Marsh and 22.5 per cent to Hutchison. On the final count, Marsh received 63 per cent of the two-candidate-preferred vote to Hutchison's 37 per cent. In comparison to the Liberal-Labor margin in 2022, this was a swing of 6.9 per cent to the Liberal Party.

2026 Nepean state by-election
Party	Candidate	Votes	%	±%
Liberal	Anthony Marsh	15,682	38.7	−9.4
One Nation	Darren Hercus	9,941	24.5	+24.5
Independent	Tracee Hutchison	8,533	21.0	+21.0
Greens	Sianan Healy	3,805	9.4	+0.6
Legalise Cannabis	Renee Thompson	1,192	2.9	+2.9
Sustainable Australia	Reade Smith	721	1.8	+1.8
Libertarian	Peter Angelico	505	1.2	+1.2
Christian Alliance	Milton Wilde	166	0.4	−0.9 (Note: Change calculated from the party's prior performance as the Companions and Pets Party.)
Total formal votes		40,545	95.1	+1.5
Informal votes		2,041	4.8	−1.5
Turnout		42,586	83.6	−5.3
Registered electors		50,910		
Two-candidate-preferred result
Liberal	Anthony Marsh	25,642	63.2	+6.9
Independent	Tracee Hutchison	14,903	36.8	+36.8
Liberal hold				

=== Analysis ===
While Marsh was easily elected after the distribution of preferences, the Liberal primary vote in Nepean fell by 9.6 per cent. Richard Willingham for ABC News and Benita Kolovos of The Guardian both suggested that some within the Liberal Party had feared a closer result prior to the election, due to a strong campaign from One Nation and Hutchison. Kolovos wrote that, but for these factors, the safeness of Nepean for the Liberal Party should have indicated a "straightforward" result at the by-election. She contrasted it with the 2023 Warrandyte by-election, also uncontested by Labor, which the Liberal Party retained easily. Kieran Rooney in The Age said that the strong support for Marsh following preferences would likely be atypical in the context of the coming state election. He credited it to Hutchison supporters being unlikely to preference One Nation over the Liberals, and One Nation explicitly recommending preferences for the Liberal Party.

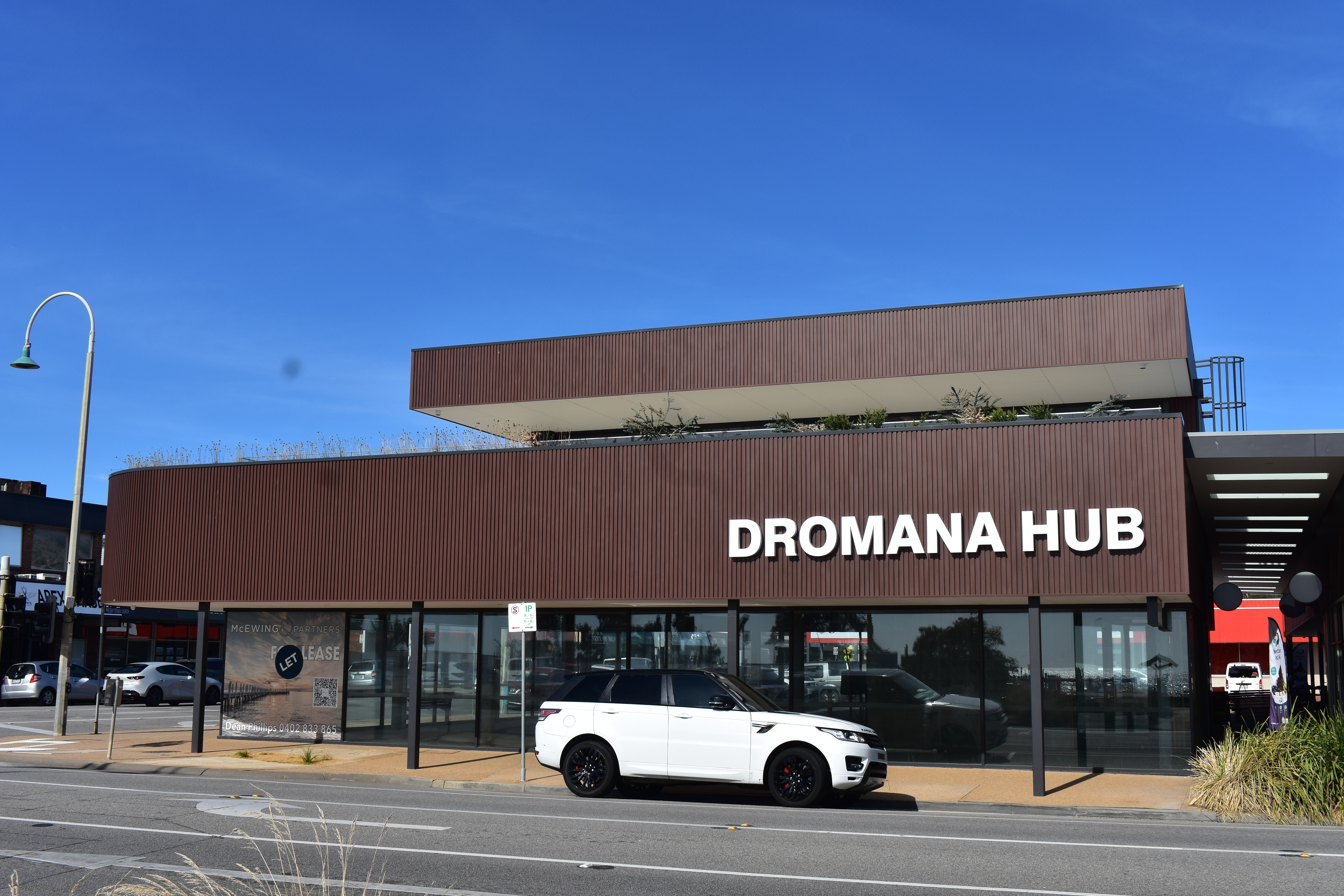
One Nation was shown to have performed well in working-class areas such as Dromana, where the Labor Party usually overperformed.

In regard to what the result may portend for One Nation, Rooney stated that One Nation's vote had come despite being outspent by the Liberal Party, and that One Nation would likely spend more money on competitive seats at the state election. Rooney said that the vote also illustrated potential problems for Labor, with the vote among left-leaning candidates (Note: Rooney compared the votes of the Labor, Greens, and the Animal Justice Party in 2022 to the votes of Hutchison, Greens, and Legalise Cannabis at the by-election.) falling from 43 per cent in 2022 to 33.45 per cent at the by-election. Rooney stated that the 10 per cent loss appeared to have gone to One Nation. A number of commentators noted the strong support One Nation had received in working-class areas where Labor had usually performed well, such as Rosebud, Dromana, and Tootgarook. Kosmos Samaras of the RedBridge polling company said that Nepean was a seat with a "geographically contained" working-class vote, and that the One Nation vote in Nepean suggested a strong support for them in socioeconomically deprived areas held by the Liberal and Labor parties at the coming state election.

Benjamin Moffitt, a senior lecturer of politics and international relations at Monash University, stated that the Nepean result confirmed the trend shown at the South Australian state election, and estimated that 10 to 15 per cent of Labor voters in 2022 had chosen to vote for One Nation. He expressed surprise at One Nation's strong performance in Nepean, as he believed that the party had "no ground game, no meaningful party organisation" in either Nepean or the state of Victoria as a whole.

Willingham wrote that the Nepean result had likely increased the Liberal Party's difficulty in forming a government at the next state election, given that they may require the support of One Nation to unseat the Labor Party. Samaras concurred, stating that while One Nation would threaten both major parties, the stress would be most acute for the Liberal Party, and that Wilson was unlikely to become premier without One Nation support.

Writing in the Australian Journal of Politics and History, Nareh Ghazarian said that the Nepean result served to consolidate Wilson's role as leader of the Liberal Party, as the Liberal Party's margin in Nepean had grown stronger.

== See also ==
- List of Victorian state by-elections
- 2026 Tasmanian Legislative Council periodic election, held on the same day as the by-election
