= Sam Groth =

Australian tennis player and politician (born 1987)

Sam Groth OLY
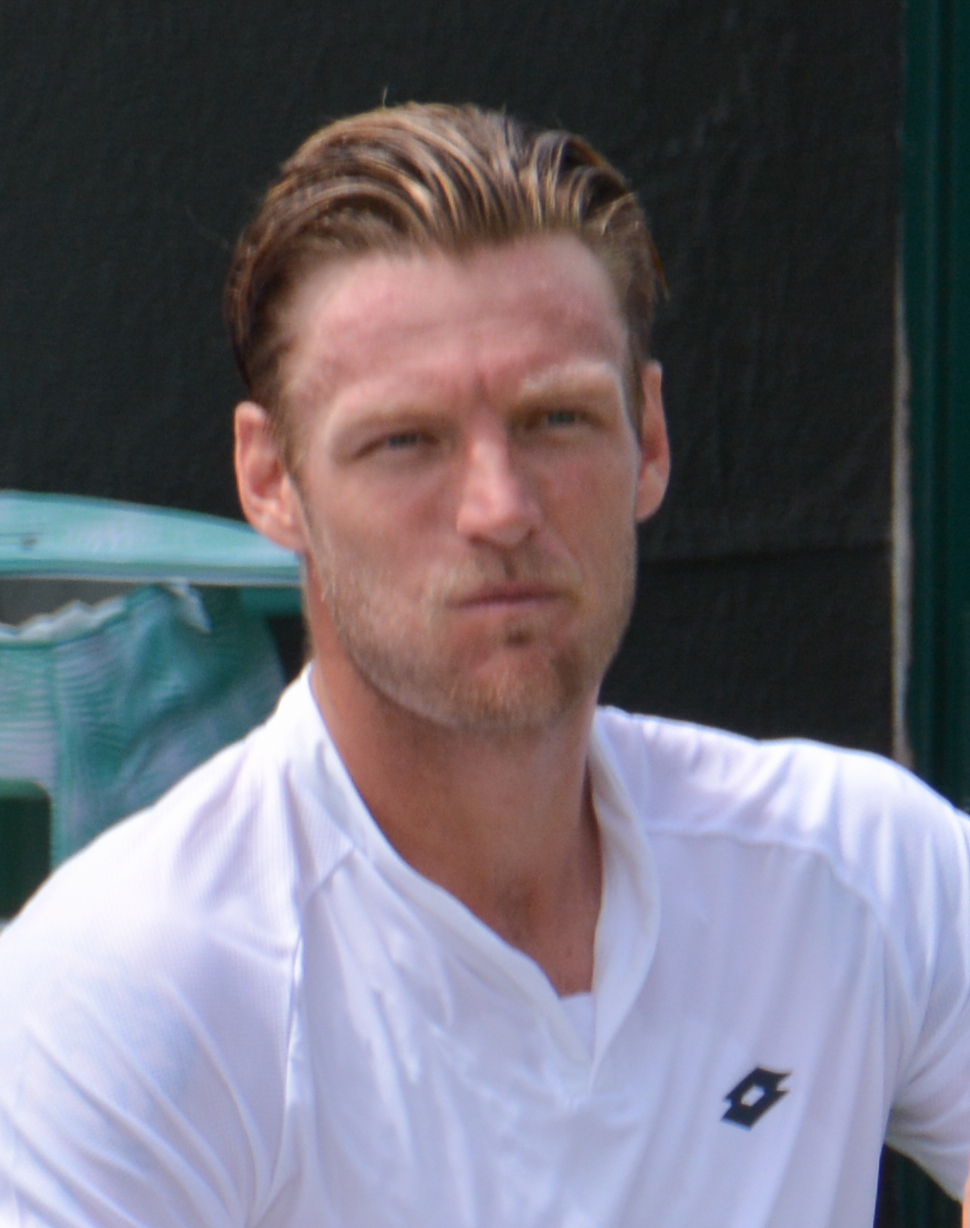
- Groth in 2015

Deputy Leader of the Opposition in Victoria
- In office 27 December 2024 – 28 January 2026
- Leader: Jess Wilson; Brad Battin
- Preceded by: David Southwick
- Succeeded by: David Southwick

Deputy Leader of the Victorian Liberal Party
- In office 27 December 2024 – 28 January 2026
- Leader: Jess Wilson; Brad Battin
- Preceded by: David Southwick
- Succeeded by: David Southwick

Member of the Victorian Parliament for Nepean
- In office 26 November 2022 – 13 February 2026
- Preceded by: Chris Brayne
- Succeeded by: Anthony Marsh

Personal details
- Born: Samuel Groth; 19 October 1987 (age 39) Narrandera, New South Wales, Australia
- Party: Liberal (since 2021)
- Spouses: Jarmila Wolfe (m. 2009; div. 2011) Brittany Boys (m. 2018)
- Children: 2
- Occupation: Politician, professional tennis player, television presenter.
- Website: www.samgrothnepean.com.au
- Tennis career
- Country (sports): Australia
- Height: 1.94 m (6 ft 4 in)
- Turned pro: 2006
- Retired: 2018
- Plays: Right-handed (one-handed backhand)
- Prize money: $1,950,436

Singles
- Career record: 38–62
- Career titles: 0
- Highest ranking: No. 53 (10 August 2015)

Grand Slam singles results
- Australian Open: 3R (2015)
- French Open: 1R (2015, 2016)
- Wimbledon: 3R (2015)
- US Open: 2R (2014, 2015)

Doubles
- Career record: 69–59
- Career titles: 2
- Highest ranking: No. 24 (2 February 2015)

Grand Slam doubles results
- Australian Open: QF (2017, 2018)
- French Open: SF (2014)
- Wimbledon: 3R (2016, 2017)
- US Open: 3R (2016)

Grand Slam mixed doubles results
- Australian Open: SF (2017)

Team competitions
- Davis Cup: SF (2015, 2017)
- Last updated on: 9 August 2021.

Samuel Groth (born 19 October 1987) is an Australian politician and professional tennis player. He was elected to the Victorian Legislative Assembly for the seat of Nepean in 2022 representing the Victorian Liberal Party until his retirement from Parliament in February 2026, causing a by-election. Prior to his resignation from Parliament he had served Deputy Leader of the state Liberal Party between 27 December 2024 and 28 January 2026.

His highest ATP singles ranking was World No. 53, which he reached in August 2015. His career high in doubles was World No. 24, reached in February 2015. Groth's best singles result was a semi-final appearance at the 2014 Hall of Fame Tennis Championships.

He holds the record for the world's fastest serve at 263 km/h (163.4 mph), which he hit in 2012 at the ATP Challenger in Busan.

Prior to his political career, he worked for the Nine Network's tennis broadcasts, and as a host on Postcards.

== Tennis career ==
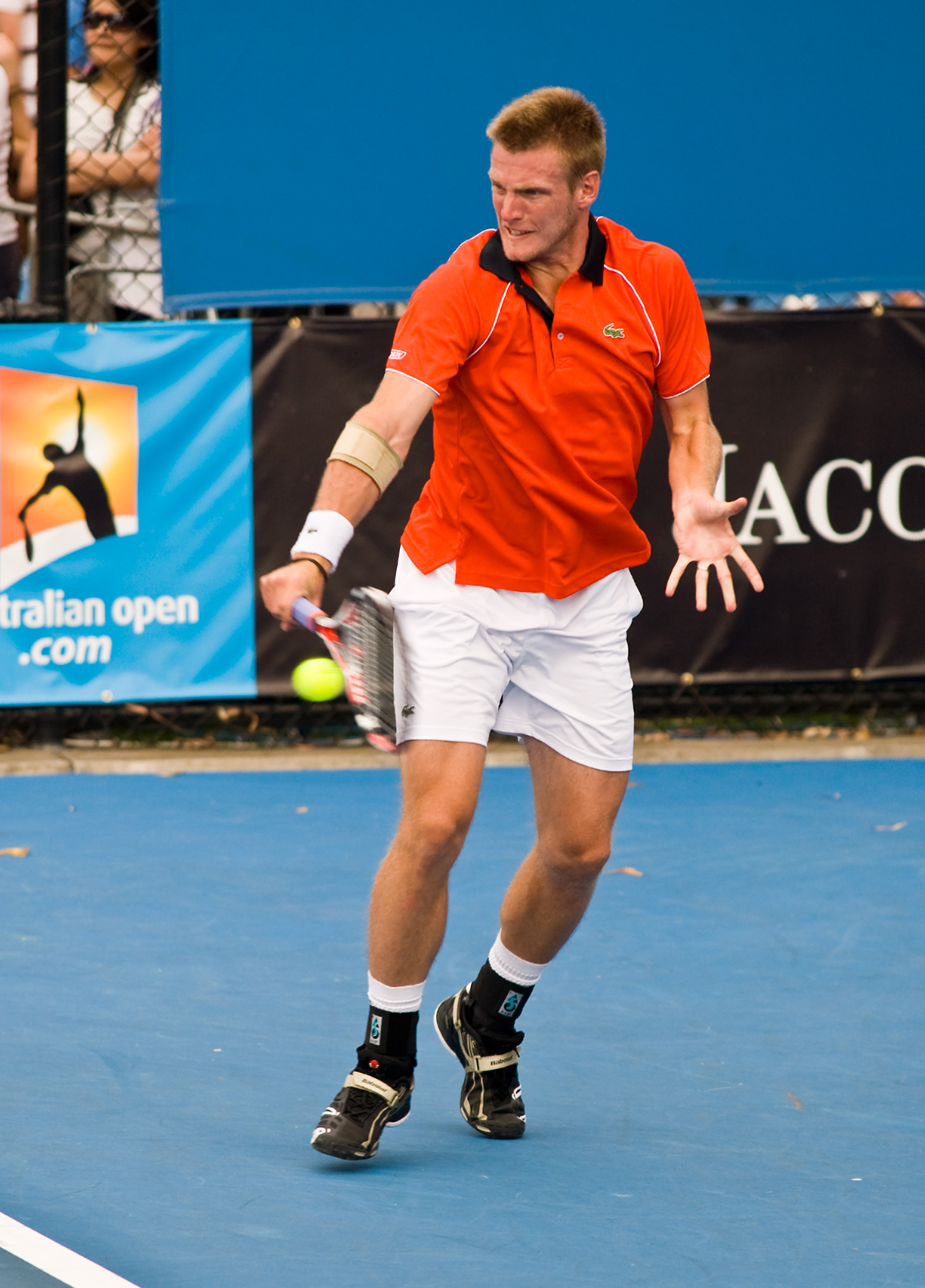
Groth in 2010

=== Juniors ===
Groth and Andrew Kennaugh of Great Britain made it to the finals of the 2005 Wimbledon boys' doubles championship, coming runners up to Jesse Levine and Michael Shabaz 6–4, 6–1.

=== 2007–2013: Fastest serve on record ===
In 2007, Groth beat compatriot Mark Philippoussis; subsequently, Philippoussis focused on the senior's tour. Groth qualified for the ATP event in Nottingham where he defeated Britain's Jamie Baker 7–6, 6–3 in the first round. He lost his second round match to seeded Gilles Simon 7–6^{(7–1)}, 4–6, 4–6.

At the 2009 Australian Open he set a record for the fastest serve by a male player (232 km/h). He lost in the qualification to Wimbledon 2009 to Jesse Levine 4–6, 7–6, 5–7.

In 2012, during an ATP Challenger in Busan, Groth hit the fastest serve on record with a 163.4 mph (263.0 km/h) ace, but lost the match to Uładzimir Ihnatsik, 4–6, 3–6.

In November 2013, he reached the final of the Champaign Challenger, eventually losing in 3 sets to Tennys Sandgren 6–3, 3–6, 6–7. However, by reaching the final there, and the semi-final of Dunlop World Challenge the following week, his ranking improved to a career high of no.173.

=== 2014 ===
In 2014, Groth was awarded a wildcard into the main draw at the Brisbane International, where he made his first ATP World Tour quarterfinal appearance.

On 8 January, Groth was awarded a wildcard into the main draw at the Australian Open, albeit lost in the first round to 28th seed, Vasek Pospisil in straight sets.

In March, Groth qualified for the Indian Wells Masters, although, his journey in the tournament didn't last long as he lost in the first round to Mikhail Kukushkin, [4–7] in the third set tie-break.

On 17 March, Groth entered and won the Rimouski Challenger in Canada. This was his first Challenger tour title. Two weeks later, he made the final of the León Challenger, but lost to no.1 seed, Rajeev Ram. This success shot him up to a new career high world ranking of 136.

At the French Open, Groth made it to the last round of qualifying, but lost to Simone Bolelli 4–6, 2–6. This was his best French Open result to date. He partnered Andrey Golubev in the Men's doubles, where they made it to the semifinal. This increased his doubles ranking to a career high of no.41. In June, Groth made the final of the Nottingham Challenge but lost to compatriot Nick Kyrgios 6–7^{(3–7)}, 6–7^{(7–9)}. Groth made his Wimbledon debut after winning his way through qualifying, but lost in the first round to Alexandr Dolgopolov in straight sets.

In July, Groth entered the Hall of Fame Open, where he reached his maiden ATP semi-final, defeating defending champion Nicolas Mahut in the quarterfinal. This achievement saw him break into the top 100 rankings for the first time in his career.

In August, Groth won his first Grand Slam match, defeating Albert Ramos Viñolas 6–3, 7–6^{(7–5)}, 6–3 in the US Open. In the second round, he was defeated by Roger Federer in straight sets 4–6, 4–6, 4–6.

=== 2015 ===
Groth started the 2015 season at the 2015 Brisbane International, where he was awarded a wildcard into the main draw. He defeated defending champion and compatriot Lleyton Hewitt in the first round, and then Łukasz Kubot in the second round before losing to eventual finalist Milos Raonic in the quarterfinals 6–7^{(5–7)}, 6–3, 6–7^{(2–7)}. At the Australian Open, Groth defeated Filip Krajinović in the first round, compatriot Thanasi Kokkinakis in the second round before losing to another compatriot Bernard Tomic in the third round. This was his best grand slam performance to date. In February, Groth headed to North America and lost in the second round of the Memphis Open to eventual runner-up Kevin Anderson. Groth lost in the first round of the Delray Beach Open, Abierto Mexicano Telcel, Indian Wells and the Miami Open. He then played the U.S. Men's Clay Court Championships and defeated Víctor Estrella Burgos in the first round. He then played top seed Feliciano López in the second round where he lost in straight sets.

Groth then played at the Santaizi Challenger as the 2nd seed. He cruised through to the final where he defeated Konstantin Kravchuk to win the title. His next tournament was the Busan Open where he was again the 2nd seed. He defeated compatriot Alex Bolt in the first round but then lost to Franko Škugor. At the French Open, Groth led 21st seed Pablo Cuevas by a set in the first round, before being run down in 4 sets.

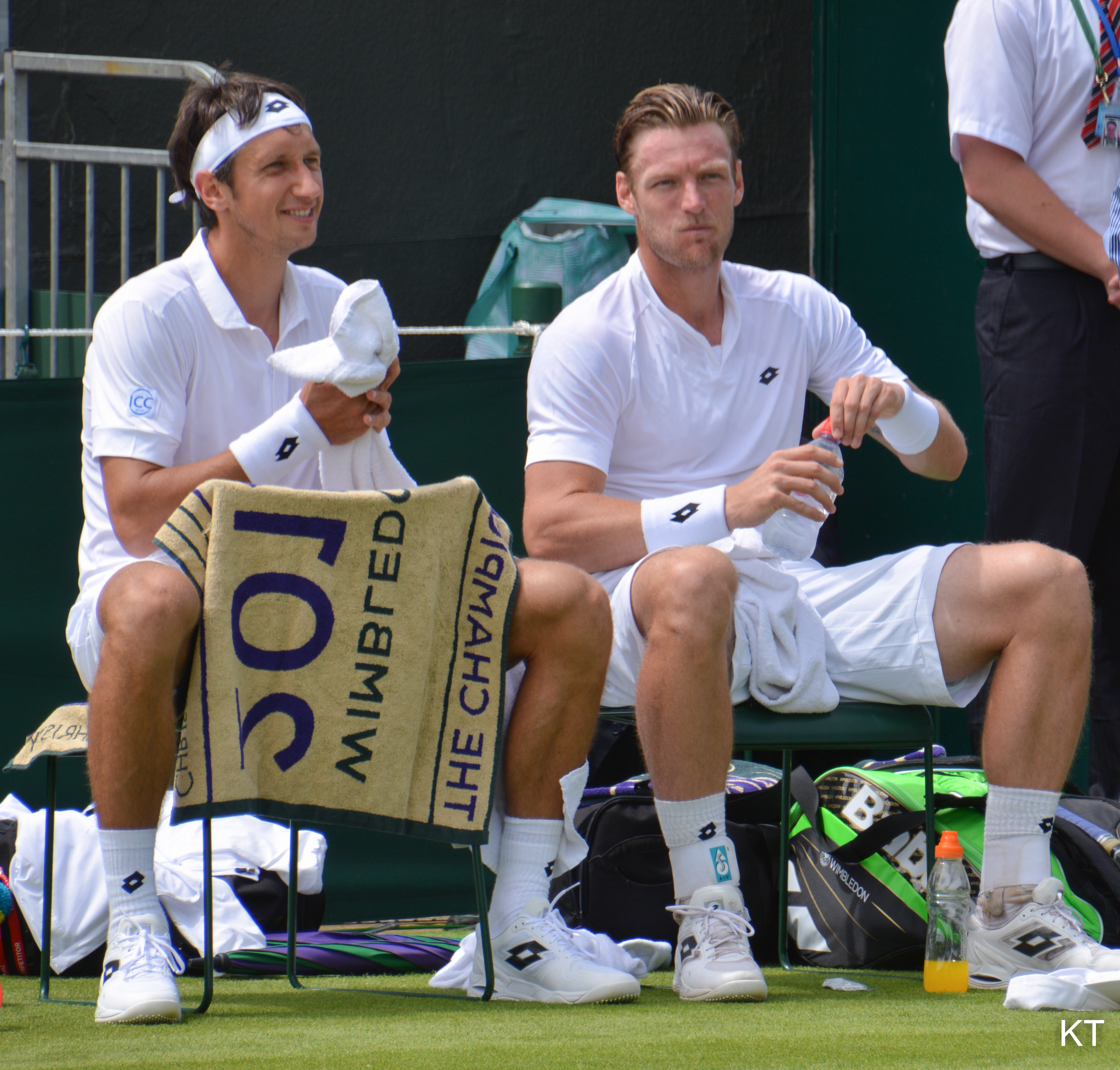
Groth with Sergiy Stakhovsky at the 2015 Wimbledon Championships.

Groth started his grass court season at the Manchester Challenger where he reached the final and defeated compatriot Luke Saville to win the title. He then competed at the ATP Mercedes Cup where he defeated Sergiy Stakhovsky in the first round. He then scored his first top 20 win by defeating world number 12 Feliciano López to reach the quarterfinal. At Wimbledon, Groth defeated 31st seed Jack Sock in the round of 128, compatriot James Duckworth in the round 64 to set up a third round match against Roger Federer.

In this 3rd round match, he made the second fastest serve ever at the Wimbledon tournament (147 mph), and was the only player to take a set off of Federer in until the final, losing to the 7-time champion 4–6, 4–6, 7–6^{(7–5)}, 2–6. Groth then represented Australia at the Davis Cup in the quarterfinal. Australia was down 2–0 to Kazakhstan when Groth played the doubles rubber with Lleyton Hewitt. The pair won in straight sets to take the tie to 2–1. Groth then replaced Nick Kyrgios to play Mikhail Kukushkin where he defeated him in 4 sets to level the tie at 2–2. Hewitt then won the 5th rubber to ensure Australia a place in the Davis Cup semi-finals with a come from behind win. Groth next contested the Bogotá Open as the 6th seed where he defeated Guido Pella before losing to former world number 8 Radek Štěpánek in straight sets. He then played at the Atlanta Open and defeated Frances Tiafoe in the first round. He then lost to eventual finalist and fifth seed Marcos Baghdatis in 3 sets. Groth then competed at the Citi Open, where he reached his first ATP500 Quarterfinal after defeating Thomaz Bellucci, 9th seeded Viktor Troicki and 7th seeded Feliciano López before losing to eventual champion Kei Nishikori. This was also the first time Groth defeated back-to-back top 20 players. Groth next played at the Winston-Salem Open and defeated Jared Donaldson before losing to eventual semi-finalist Steve Johnson. At the US Open, Groth defeated former world number 13 Alexandr Dolgopolov in the first round, before losing to 26th seed Tommy Robredo in the second round. Groth also played the Men's doubles with Lleyton Hewitt, bowing out with a loss in the second round.

=== 2016: Loss of form ===
Groth began 2016 with a wildcard entry into the Brisbane International. He lost to Chung Hyeon in the first round. He also lost in round one at the Sydney International to Federico Delbonis. At the Australian Open, Groth defeated Adrian Mannarino before losing to number 2 seed Andy Murray in the second round. Groth partnered Lleyton Hewitt in the men's doubles at the Australian Open, making it to the third round. Groth played for Australia in Davis Cup losing his singles match to John Isner in straight sets. He had a first round loss at the first Masters 1000 of the year at Indian Wells to Leonardo Mayer. Groth then defeated Víctor Estrella Burgos at the Miami Open before going down to Dominic Thiem in the second round. At the French Open, Groth lost in round 1 to 9-time champion Rafael Nadal. At Wimbledon, Groth lost in the first round to Kei Nishikori. Groth had a last-minute call-up to represent Australia at the 2016 Summer Olympics in Rio de Janeiro, albeit losing to Belgium's David Goffin in the first round. Groth played across North America with limited success on the ATP singles World Tour, although the misery was short-lived as he won his second doubles title in Newport before returning to the Challenger Circuit, winning his 4th singles title in Las Vegas. Groth ended the 2016 season as the world no.185 rank.

=== 2017 ===
Groth began 2017 with a wildcard into the 2017 Brisbane International, where he defeated Pierre-Hugues Herbert before losing to Dominic Thiem in the second round. Groth reached the quarterfinal of the 2017 Canberra Challenger, losing to eventual champion Dudi Sela. Groth lost in the first round of 2017 Australian Open to Steve Darcis, before pairing up with Chris Guccione to reach the quarterfinal of the doubles, losing to eventual champions Henri Kontinen and John Peers. In February, Groth was selected to play in the first round of the 2017 Davis Cup against the Czech Republic, he paired with John Peers to win the doubles and taking Australia to a whitewash victory of 3–0. Groth toured to North America, beginning by losing qualifying in the singles for Indian Wells Masters, then at the Drummondville Challenger he also lost qualifying in the singles, before going onto win the doubles at Drummondville. In June, Groth made the semi-final of Ilkley Trophy.

=== 2018: Retirement ===
The 2018 Australian Open turned out to be Groth's last tournament before his retirement. He lost in his singles quarterfinal match to Taylor Fritz. He paired with former world no. 1 compatriot Lleyton Hewitt in doubles, where they reached the quarterfinals. He also paired with compatriot Samantha Stosur in the mixed doubles.

== ATP career finals ==
=== Doubles: 5 (2 titles, 3 runner-ups) ===
Legend Grand Slam tournaments (0–0) ATP World Tour Finals (0–0) ATP World Tour Masters 1000 (0–0) ATP World Tour 500 Series (0–1) ATP World Tour 250 Series (2–2)	Titles by surface Hard (1–3) Clay (0–0) Grass (1–0)	Titles by setting Outdoor (2–2) Indoor (0–1)

Result	W–L	Date	Tournament	Tier	Surface	Partner	Opponents	Score
Win	1–0	Jul 2014	Colombia Open, Colombia	250 Series	Hard	(Australia) Chris Guccione	(Colombia) Nicolás Barrientos (Colombia) Juan Sebastián Cabal	7–6^{(7–5)}, 6–7^{(3–7)}, [11–9]
Loss	1–1	Aug 2014	Washington Open, United States	500 Series	Hard	(India) Leander Paes	(Netherlands) Jean-Julien Rojer (Romania) Horia Tecău	5–7, 4–6
Loss	1–2	Sep 2014	Shenzhen Open, China	250 Series	Hard	(Australia) Chris Guccione	(Netherlands) Jean-Julien Rojer (Romania) Horia Tecău	4–6, 6–7^{(4–7)}
Loss	1–3	Oct 2014	Kremlin Cup, Russia	250 Series	Hard (i)	(Australia) Chris Guccione	(Czech Republic) František Čermák (Czech Republic) Jiří Veselý	6–7^{(2–7)}, 5–7
Win	2–3	Jul 2016	Hall of Fame Tennis Championships, United States	250 Series	Grass	(Australia) Chris Guccione	(United Kingdom) Jonathan Marray (Canada) Adil Shamasdin	6–4, 6–3

== ATP Challenger and ITF Futures finals ==
=== Singles: 22 (11–11) ===
Legend ATP Challenger (4–6) ITF Futures (7–5)	Finals by surface Hard (7–8) Clay (1–1) Grass (2–2) Carpet (1–0)

Result	W–L	Date	Tournament	Tier	Surface	Opponent	Score
Loss	0–1	Oct 2006	Australia F12, Mildura	Futures	Grass	(Australia) Alun Jones	6–3, 5–7, 4–6
Loss	0–2	Oct 2007	Australia F7, Gloucester	Futures	Clay	(Australia) Miles Armstrong	7–6^{(8–6)}, 1–6, 3–6
Win	1–2	Apr 2009	USA F7, Mobile	Futures	Hard	(United States) Jesse Witten	6–2, 3–0 ret.
Loss	1–3	May 2009	Fergana, Uzbekistan	Challenger	Hard	(Slovakia) Lukáš Lacko	6–4, 5–7, 6–7^{(4–7)}
Win	2–3	Oct 2010	Turkey F9, Antalya	Futures	Hard	(Moldova) Radu Albot	6–3, 6–1
Win	3–3	Oct 2010	Turkey F10, Antalya	Futures	Hard	(Ukraine) Artem Smirnov	6–4, 6–2
Loss	3–4	Nov 2010	Australia F12, Traralgon	Futures	Hard	(Israel) Amir Weintraub	2–6, 4–6
Win	4–4	Dec 2010	Australia F13, Bendigo	Futures	Hard	(Australia) Benjamin Mitchell	7–6^{(9–7)}, 6–4
Loss	4–5	Feb 2012	Burnie, Australia	Challenger	Hard	(Thailand) Danai Udomchoke	6–7^{(5–7)}, 3–6
Win	5–5	Mar 2012	Australia F3, Ipswich	Futures	Clay	(Australia) Jason Kubler	5–7, 6–3, 6–2
Win	6–5	May 2012	Korea F1, Daegu	Futures	Hard	(Denmark) Frederik Nielsen	6–7^{(4–7)}, 6–4, 6–1
Loss	6–6	May 2012	Korea F2, Changwon	Futures	Hard	(Poland) Michał Przysiężny	6–3, 5–7, 3–6
Loss	6–7	Sep 2012	Australia F6, Alice Springs	Futures	Hard	(Australia) Matthew Barton	6–7^{(3–7)}, 3–6
Win	7–7	Feb 2013	Australia F2, Mildura	Futures	Grass	(Australia) Matthew Barton	6–1, 6–4
Loss	7–8	Nov 2013	Champaign-Urbana, United States	Challenger	Hard	(United States) Tennys Sandgren	6–3, 3–6, 6–7^{(4–7)}
Win	8–8	Mar 2014	Rimouski, Canada	Challenger	Hard	(Croatia) Ante Pavić	7–6^{(7–3)}, 6–2
Loss	8–9	Apr 2014	Leon, Mexico	Challenger	Hard	(United States) Rajeev Ram	2–6, 2–6
Loss	8–10	Jun 2014	Nottingham, United Kingdom	Challenger	Grass	(Australia) Nick Kyrgios	6–7^{(3–7)}, 6–7^{(7–9)}
Loss	8–11	Nov 2014	Knoxville, United States	Challenger	Hard	(France) Adrian Mannarino	6–3, 6–7^{(6–8)}, 4–6
Win	9–11	May 2015	Taipei, Taiwan	Challenger	Carpet	(Russia) Konstantin Kravchuk	6–7^{(5–7)}, 6–4, 7–6^{(7–3)}
Win	10–11	Jun 2015	Manchester, United Kingdom	Challenger	Grass	(Australia) Luke Saville	7–5, 6–1
Win	11–11	Oct 2016	Las Vegas, United States	Challenger	Hard	(Colombia) Santiago Giraldo	6–7^{(4–7)}, 6–4, 7–5

=== Doubles: 40 (30–10) ===
Legend ATP Challenger (19–5) ITF Futures (11–5)	Finals by surface Hard (21–8) Clay (2–1) Grass (5–1) Carpet (2–0)

Result	W–L	Date	Tournament	Tier	Surface	Partner	Opponents	Score
Win	1–0	Nov 2005	Australia F11, Barmera	Futures	Grass	(Australia) Joseph Sirianni	(Australia) Callum Beale (Australia) Joel Kerley	6–2, 5–7, [10–4]
Loss	1–1	Jul 2006	Great Britain F10, Frinton-on-Sea	Futures	Grass	(Australia) Andrew Coelho	(United Kingdom) Andrew Kennaugh (United Kingdom) Tom Rushby	5–7, 7–6^{(7–3)}, 4–6
Loss	1–2	Sep 2006	France F12, Bagnères-de-Bigorre	Futures	Hard	(Australia) Paul Baccanello	(France) Thomas Oger (France) Nicolas Tourte	6–2, 3–6, 4–6
Loss	1–3	Mar 2007	Great Britain F6, Sunderland	Futures	Hard	(Australia) Andrew Coelho	(United Kingdom) Jamie Baker (Pakistan) Aisam Qureshi	3–6, 6–3, 3–6
Win	2–3	May 2007	Algeria F3, Algiers	Futures	Clay	(United Kingdom) Edward Seator	(Slovakia) Matus Horecny (Slovakia) Martin Hromec	6–3, 3–6, 6–1
Win	3–3	Jun 2007	Spain F21, Puerto Cruz	Futures	Carpet	(Australia) Andrew Coelho	(Spain) Agustin Boje-Ordonez (Spain) Pablo Martin-Adalia	6–4, 7–6^{(7–5)}
Win	4–3	Sep 2007	France F12, Bagnères-de-Bigorre	Futures	Hard	(Australia) Andrew Coelho	(Australia) Daniel King-Turner (France) Pierrick Ysern	6–4, 4–6, [10–6]
Win	5–3	Oct 2007	Australia F7, Gloucester	Futures	Clay	(Australia) Joseph Sirianni	(Australia) Kaden Hensel (France) Adam Hubble	6–4, 6–3
Win	6–3	Dec 2007	Burnie, Australia	Challenger	Hard	(Australia) Joseph Sirianni	(United States) Nima Roshan (Australia) José Statham	6–3, 1–6, [10–4]
Win	7–3	Feb 2008	Australia F1, Mildura	Futures	Grass	(Australia) Nathan Healey	(Australia) Andrew Coelho (Australia) Brydan Klein	6–3, 6–4
Win	8–3	Mar 2008	Australia F3, Perth	Futures	Hard	(Australia) Adam Feeney	(Australia) Matthew Ebden (Australia) Miles Armstrong	5–7, 6–4, [10–7]
Win	9–3	May 2008	New Delhi, India	Challenger	Hard	(Australia) Colin Ebelthite	(Kuwait) Mohammad Ghareeb (Ukraine) Illya Marchenko	2–6, 7–6^{(7–5)}, [10–8]
Win	10–3	Aug 2009	Campos do Jordão, Brazil	Challenger	Hard	(United Kingdom) Josh Goodall	(Brazil) Rogério Dutra Silva (Brazil) Júlio Silva	7–6^{(7–4)}, 6–3
Win	11–3	Feb 2010	Burnie, Australia	Challenger	Hard	(Australia) Matthew Ebden	(Australia) James Lemke (Australia) Dane Propoggia	6–7^{(8–10)}, 7–6^{(7–4)}, [10–8]
Win	12–3	Feb 2010	Australia F1, Mildura	Futures	Grass	(Australia) Matthew Ebden	(Australia) Adam Hubble (Australia) Sadik Kadir	6–3, 4–6, [10–4]
Win	13–3	Feb 2010	Australia F2, Berri	Futures	Grass	(Australia) Matthew Ebden	(Chinese Taipei) Huang Liang-chi (Chinese Taipei) Lee Hsin-han	6–3, 7–6^{(9–7)}
Loss	13–4	Nov 2010	Australia F12, Traralgon	Futures	Hard	(Germany) Sebastian Rieschick	(Australia) Colin Ebelthite (Australia) Adam Feeney	3–6, 6–4, [13–15]
Win	14–4	Feb 2011	Caloundra, Australia	Challenger	Hard	(Australia) Matthew Ebden	(Slovakia) Pavol Červenák (Slovakia) Ivo Klec	6–3, 3–6, [10–1]
Loss	14–5	Mar 2012	Pingguo, China	Challenger	Hard	(Australia) Colin Ebelthite	(United States) John Paul Fruttero (South Africa) Raven Klaasen	2–6, 4–6
Win	15–5	May 2012	Korea F1, Daegu	Futures	Hard	(Australia) Adam Hubble	(South Korea) Hong Chung (South Korea) Suk-Young Jeong	6–1, 6–4
Loss	15–6	Jul 2012	Wuhan, China	Challenger	Hard	(Australia) Adam Feeney	(Thailand) Sonchat Ratiwatana (Thailand) Sanchai Ratiwatana	4–6, 6–2, [8–10]
Loss	15–7	Sep 2012	Australia F6, Alice Springs	Futures	Hard	(New Zealand) Michael Venus	(Australia) Adam Feeney (Australia) Nick Lindahl	6–4, 2–6, [8–10]
Win	16–7	Jan 2013	Nouméa, New Caledonia	Challenger	Hard	(Japan) Toshihide Matsui	(New Zealand) Artem Sitak (New Zealand) José Statham	7–6^{(8–6)}, 1–6, [10–4]
Win	17–7	Feb 2013	West Lakes, Australia	Challenger	Hard	(Australia) Matt Reid	(Australia) James Duckworth (Australia) Greg Jones	6–2, 6–4
Win	18–7	Feb 2013	Australia F2, Mildura	Futures	Grass	(Australia) John-Patrick Smith	(Australia) Colin Ebelthite (South Africa) Ruan Roelofse	6–3, 6–4
Win	19–7	Mar 2013	Rimouski, Canada	Challenger	Hard	(Australia) John-Patrick Smith	(Germany) Philipp Marx (Romania) Florin Mergea	7–6^{(7–5)}, 7–6^{(9–7)}
Loss	19–8	Apr 2013	Guadalajara, Mexico	Challenger	Hard	(Australia) John-Patrick Smith	(Croatia) Marin Draganja (Croatia) Mate Pavić	7–5, 2–6, [11–13]
Loss	19–9	May 2013	Anning, China	Challenger	Clay	(Australia) John-Patrick Smith	(Russia) Victor Baluda (Croatia) Dino Marcan	7–6^{(7–5)}, 4–6, [7–10]
Win	20–9	May 2013	Kunming, China	Challenger	Hard	(Australia) John-Patrick Smith	(Japan) Yasutaka Uchiyama (Japan) Go Soeda	6–4, 6–1
Win	21–9	Nov 2013	Knoxville, United States	Challenger	Hard	(Australia) John-Patrick Smith	(Australia) Carsten Ball (Canada) Peter Polansky	6–7^{(6–8)}, 6–2, [10–7]
Win	22–9	Feb 2014	Dallas, United States	Challenger	Hard	(Australia) Chris Guccione	(United States) Ryan Harrison (The Bahamas) Mark Knowles	6–4, 6–2
Win	23–9	Apr 2014	Leon, Mexico	Challenger	Hard	(Australia) Chris Guccione	(New Zealand) Marcus Daniell (New Zealand) Artem Sitak	6–3, 6–4
Win	24–9	Apr 2014	Shenzhen, China	Challenger	Hard	(Australia) Chris Guccione	(Germany) Dominik Meffert (Germany) Tim Pütz	6–3, 7–6^{(7–5)}
Win	25–9	May 2014	Taipei, Taiwan	Challenger	Carpet	(Australia) Chris Guccione	(United States) Austin Krajicek (Australia) John-Patrick Smith	6–4, 5–7, [10–8]
Win	26–9	May 2014	Gimcheon, South Korea	Challenger	Hard	(Australia) Chris Guccione	(United States) Austin Krajicek (Australia) John-Patrick Smith	6–7^{(5–7)}, 5–7, [10–4]
Loss	26–10	Apr 2016	Leon, Mexico	Challenger	Hard	(India) Leander Paes	(Mexico) Santiago González (Croatia) Mate Pavić	4–6, 6–3, [11–13]
Win	27–10	May 2016	Busan, South Korea	Challenger	Hard	(India) Leander Paes	(Thailand) Sonchat Ratiwatana (Thailand) Sanchai Ratiwatana	4–6, 6–1, [10–7]
Win	28–10	Oct 2016	Stockton, United States	Challenger	Hard	(United States) Brian Baker	(Australia) Matt Reid (Australia) John-Patrick Smith	6–2, 4–6, [10–2]
Win	29–10	Nov 2016	Charlottesville, United States	Challenger	Hard	(United States) Brian Baker	(United Kingdom) Brydan Klein (South Africa) Ruan Roelofse	6–3, 6–3
Win	30–10	Mar 2017	Drummondville, Canada	Challenger	Hard	(Canada) Adil Shamasdin	(Australia) Matt Reid (Australia) John-Patrick Smith	6–2, 2–6, [10–8]

== Junior Grand Slam finals ==
=== Doubles: 1 (1 runner-up) ===
Result	Year	Tournament	Surface	Partner	Opponents	Score
Loss	2005	Wimbledon	Grass	(United Kingdom) Andrew Kennaugh	(United States) Jesse Levine (United States) Michael Shabaz	4–6, 1–6

== Performance timelines ==
Key
W	F	SF	QF	#R	RR	Q#	P#	DNQ	A	Z#	PO	G	S	B	NMS	NTI	P	NH

(W) winner; (F) finalist; (SF) semifinalist; (QF) quarterfinalist; (#R) rounds 4, 3, 2, 1; (RR) round-robin stage; (Q#) qualification round; (P#) preliminary round; (DNQ) did not qualify; (A) absent; (Z#) Davis/Fed Cup Zonal Group (with number indication) or (PO) play-off; (G) gold, (S) silver or (B) bronze Olympic/Paralympic medal; (NMS) not a Masters tournament; (NTI) not a Tier I tournament; (P) postponed; (NH) not held; (SR) strike rate (events won / competed); (W–L) win–loss record.
To avoid confusion and double counting, these charts are updated at the conclusion of a tournament or when the player's participation has ended.

=== Singles ===
Tournament	2006	2007	2008	2009	2010	2011	2012	2013	2014	2015	2016	2017	2018	SR	W–L	Win %
Grand Slam tournaments
Australian Open	A	A	Q2	1R	Q1	Q1	A	Q1	1R	3R	2R	1R	Q1	0 / 5	3–5	38%
French Open	A	A	A	A	A	A	A	Q1	Q3	1R	1R	Q1	A	0 / 2	0–2	0%
Wimbledon	A	A	A	Q1	A	A	A	Q2	1R	3R	1R	Q1	A	0 / 3	2–3	0%
US Open	A	A	Q2	Q1	A	A	A	Q1	2R	2R	Q1	Q1	A	0 / 2	2–2	50%
Win–loss	0–0	0–0	0–0	0–1	0–0	0–0	0–0	0–0	1–3	5–4	1–3	0–1	0–0	0 / 12	7–12	37%
National representation
Summer Olympics	NH		A	Not Held			A	Not Held			1R	NH		0 / 1	0–1	0%
Davis Cup	A	A	A	A	A	A	A	A	PO	SF	1R	SF	A	0 / 2	2–4	33%
ATP World Tour Masters 1000
Indian Wells	A	A	A	A	A	Q1	A	A	1R	1R	1R	Q1	A	0 / 3	0–3	0%
Miami	A	A	A	A	A	A	A	A	A	1R	2R	A	A	0 / 2	1–2	33%
Canada Masters	A	A	A	A	A	A	A	A	A	A	Q1	A	A	0 / 0	0–0	–
Shanghai Masters	Not Held			A	A	A	A	A	1R	A	A	A	A	0 / 1	0–1	0%
Win–loss	0–0	0–0	0–0	0–0	0–0	0–0	0–0	0–0	0–2	0–2	1–2	0–0	0–0	0 / 6	1–6	14%
Career statistics
Titles / Finals	0 / 0	0 / 0	0 / 0	0 / 0	0 / 0	0 / 0	0 / 0	0 / 0	0 / 0	0 / 0	0 / 0	0 / 0	0 / 0	0 / 0		
Overall win–loss	0–0	0–0	1–1	1–2	0–0	0–0	0–0	1–3	10–13	19–22	4–16	2–5	0–0	0 / 62	38–62	38%
Year-end ranking	681	341	265	270	293	575	211	183	81	60	181	248	–	$1,950,436		

=== Doubles ===
Tournament	2006	2007	2008	2009	2010	2011	2012	2013	2014	2015	2016	2017	2018	SR	W–L
Grand Slam tournaments
Australian Open	A	A	1R	1R	1R	2R	A	2R	1R	3R	3R	QF	QF	0 / 10	12–10
French Open	A	A	A	A	A	A	A	A	SF	1R	1R	3R	A	0 / 4	6–4
Wimbledon	A	A	A	A	A	A	A	2R	1R	1R	3R	3R	A	0 / 5	5–5
US Open	A	A	A	A	A	A	A	A	2R	2R	3R	1R	A	0 / 4	4–4
Win–loss	0–0	0–0	0–1	0–1	0–1	1–1	0–0	2–2	5–4	3–4	6–4	7–4	3–1	0 / 23	27–23
National representation
Summer Olympics	NH		A	Not Held			A	Not Held			A	NH		0 / 0	0–0
Davis Cup	A	A	A	A	A	A	A	A	PO	SF	1R	SF	A	0 / 2	3–3
Win–loss	0–0	0–0	0–0	0–0	0–0	0–0	0–0	0–0	0–0	1–2	1–0	1–1	0–0	0 / 2	3–3
Career statistics
Titles / Finals	0 / 0	0 / 0	0 / 0	0 / 0	0 / 0	0 / 0	0 / 0	0 / 0	1 / 4	0 / 0	1 / 1	0 / 0	0 / 0	2 / 5	
Overall win–loss	0–0	0–0	0–1	0–1	0–1	2–2	0–0	4–3	24–13	8–20	15–9	13–8	3–1	69–59	
Year-end ranking	438	296	287	400	223	204	308	79	31	131	49	80		54%	

== Political career ==
Electoral performance (Pre-selection)
Year(s)	Electorate	Candidates	Votes
2022 (Note: To determine the Liberal candidate that will run for the seat.)	Nepean	Sam Groth	74
2022	Nepean	David Burgess	33
2022	Nepean	Elizabeth Miller	4

On 22 February 2022, Groth won pre-selection for the Liberal Party for the marginal Labor-held electorate of Nepean. Groth told Sky News Australia that part of his motivation for running was frustration with the extent of COVID-related lockdowns in Victoria. Groth won the three-candidate contest with seventy-four votes (67%), compared with runner-up David Burgess' thirty-three, and former Bentleigh MP Elizabeth Miller with four. He had the backing of former Victorian Premier Jeff Kennett, Federal Treasurer at the time, Josh Frydenberg, state MP for Brighton James Newbury and former Nepean MP Martin Dixon.

=== 2022 Victorian election ===
Electoral term
Years	Electorate	Term
2022–2026	Nepean	60th

Speaking before the election, Groth stated of his possibility to win the seat: "It's been extremely positive. I'm confident, if we are to have any chance tonight of the Liberal Party and the Coalition getting into government in this state, Nepean is the one that has to turn."

Groth claimed victory in Nepean on the night of the election with a two-party swing of 7.1% in his favour. After the election, Groth was appointed Shadow Minister for Youth and Shadow Minister for Tourism, Sport and Events in the Pesutto shadow ministry.

In 2023, as a member of Shadow Cabinet, Groth supported leader John Pesutto in voting to expel Moira Deeming from the Parliamentary Liberal Party.

=== Deputy Leader of the Victorian Liberal Party ===
Groth resigned from the Pesutto shadow cabinet on 13 December 2024, following Pesutto's loss in a defamation case brought by Moira Deeming, stating: "In good conscience, I can no longer continue to serve in this role". This move was criticised by some moderate members of the party.

On 27 December 2024, Groth was elected unopposed as Deputy Leader of the Liberal Party under new leader Brad Battin as part of a broader spill and change among parliamentary leadership.

Groth was re-elected as Deputy Leader of the Liberal Party under new leader Jess Wilson on 18 November 2025, defeating former Deputy Leader David Southwick in a party room ballot.

Following a subsequent Shadow Cabinet reshuffle, Groth was appointed Shadow Minister for Tourism, Sport and Major Events and Shadow Minister for Trade and Investment.

=== Expenses controversy ===
Groth came under scrutiny in May 2025 after it was revealed he borrowed Liberal Party colleague Georgie Crozier's chauffeur to drive him to his home in Rye following a fundraising event at the 2024 Australian Open tennis tournament. The Herald Sun newspaper claimed Groth was "smashed" at the event, which Groth denied. Crozier subsequently stated that Groth "needs to explain his actions."

Groth issued a statement saying he had attended the Australian Open in his capacity as Shadow Minister for Sport, Tourism and Events, meeting with industry stakeholders before attending a fundraiser in the evening.

Additionally, Groth stated he occasionally stays overnight in Melbourne if he has evening events and commitments the next day in the city, given the distance between Melbourne and his electorate of Nepean.

It was also revealed Groth had claimed $1,400 for flights and accommodation to visit South Australia to meet with a South Australian Liberal Party colleague and attend the LIV golf event in Adelaide with his wife. Groth stated that he attended the LIV event in South Australia at the invitation of event organisers to meet with stakeholders, and that any travel for his wife is paid for personally.

=== Retirement from politics ===
In January 2026, Groth announced he would not contest the 2026 Victorian state election, stating "The public pressure placed on my family in recent months has been significant and realising that some of it came from within my own party has been difficult to ignore”.

On 28 January 2026, Groth was replaced by David Southwick as deputy leader of the Victorian Liberal Party in a ballot against Chris Crewther.

On 4 February, Groth made an announcement stating he will resign from the Parliament of Victoria in the coming week, triggering a by-election in his seat of Nepean, which was held on May 2, just months before the 2026 Victorian state election. Groth was succeeded by former Mornington Shire Council Mayor Anthony Marsh.

== Personal life ==
Groth was born in Narrandera, New South Wales, and grew up in the Riverina area of southern New South Wales. Groth is an avid supporter of the Sydney Swans in the Australian Football League. He was also a member of Vermont Football Club reserve squad during a hiatus from tennis in 2011.

In January 2019, Groth received the OLY post-nominal title at the Brisbane International tournament.

Between 2009 and 2011, Groth was married to Slovak-Australian tennis player Jarmila Wolfe.

Groth married partner Brittany Boys in 2018. Boys, a Melburnian, was an amateur women's tennis player and competed at the university level for the University of Richmond in the United States. Groth and Boys have two children, twin boys born in April 2021.

In 2025, in articles subsequently removed from the Herald Sun website and social media accounts, the newspaper alleged that Boys and Groth started their relationship after meeting at a Templestowe tennis club in 2011 while Groth was either 23 or 24 and Boys was 16 or 17 and under his supervision as a tennis coach. The paper claimed "concerns had been raised within the Liberal Party because Mr Groth was in his mid-20s and Ms Groth may have been under 18 at the time." Melbourne’s other major newspaper, The Age, reported that there was a suggestion that "the allegations about his personal life had been fanned by MPs within his own party.

Subsequently, the Groths each released a statement condemning the Herald Sun's coverage and sued the newspaper for defamation.

In November 2025, the Herald Sun published an apology to Groth and his wife as part of the settlement of the lawsuit which The Age newspaper reported was part of a confidential agreement worth "hundreds of thousands of dollars". It was later reported that the Herald-Sun's defence claimed "an unnamed Liberal MP had been central to the story."

Groth lives with his family in Rye, Victoria.

== Notes ==
Parliament of Victoria
Preceded by Chris Brayne	Member for Nepean; 2022–2026	Incumbent

Records
Preceded by Ivo Karlović	Fastest serve world record holder 12 May 2012 – present	Succeeded by Incumbent
