= Christian Alliance Party – Reform AU =

Australian political party

Christian Alliance Party - Reform AU
- Chairperson: John Hutchison
- Registered: 19 September 2022
- Seats in the Victorian Legislative Council: 0 / 40

Website
- https://companionsandpetsparty.com.au/

Christian Alliance Party – Reform AU is a political party registered in Victoria. Registered in 2022 as the Companions and Pets Party, chairperson John Hutchison said at the time that the party was opposed to "animal liberationism", and it has been described as against the Animal Justice Party. It is currently unrepresented in the Parliament of Victoria, failing to win any seats in the Legislative Council at the 2022 state election. After briefly being known as End Mass Immigration – Reform AU, the party adopted its current name in advance of the 2026 state election.

== History ==
The Companions and Pets Party was first registered as a political party in Victoria on 19 September 2022. Its inaugural chair was John Hutchison, a dog breeder who has been involved in the greyhound racing industry. Hutchison stated to The Weekly Times in October 2022 that the party was founded to support those with pets who "don’t subscribe to the views of animal liberationism", and additionally expressed opposition to protests on farms. The party has been identified as opposing the Animal Justice Party, which supports a ban on greyhound racing and advocates for animal welfare concerns. At the 2022 Victorian state election, the party received 0.44% of the statewide vote in the Victorian Legislative Council, and 1.3% of the vote in the sole Legislative Assembly seat it contested, the district of Nepean.

Although the party is unregistered in New South Wales, it ran radio ads in advance of the 2023 state election stating that the Animal Justice Party would stop pet ownership. Emma Hurst, an MP for the Animal Justice Party, described the Companions and Pets Party's advertisements as "blatant lies".

According to the party's website, Hutchison is currently the party chairperson, greyhound trainer Robert Britton is the party's director, and dog show judge Craig Reid is a member of the party's board. Both Hutchison, Britton, and Reid were the founders of the Companions and Pets Party.

The Companions and Pets Party applied in March 2025 to change its name to the Liberal Democratic Party, which was refused by the Victorian Electoral Commission for not complying with the requirements of the Electoral Act 2002. The party again applied to change its name in November 2025, this time to End Mass Immigration – Reform AU. This name change was successful on 23 December 2025.

The party stood under this name at the 2026 Nepean state by-election, with former police officer Milton Wilde as their candidate. Wilde came last out of eight candidates, polling 0.4%.

In the lead-up to the 2026 state election, the party applied for another name change, to Christian Alliance Party - Reform AU. The new name was approved by the VEC in August 2026.

== Electoral history ==
Victorian Legislative Council
Election year	# of overall votes	% of overall vote	# of overall seats	+/−	Ref.	Notes
2022	16,464	0.44	0 / 40	Steady		Extra-parliamentary
