= Anthony Marsh =

Australian politician

Anthony Marsh MP
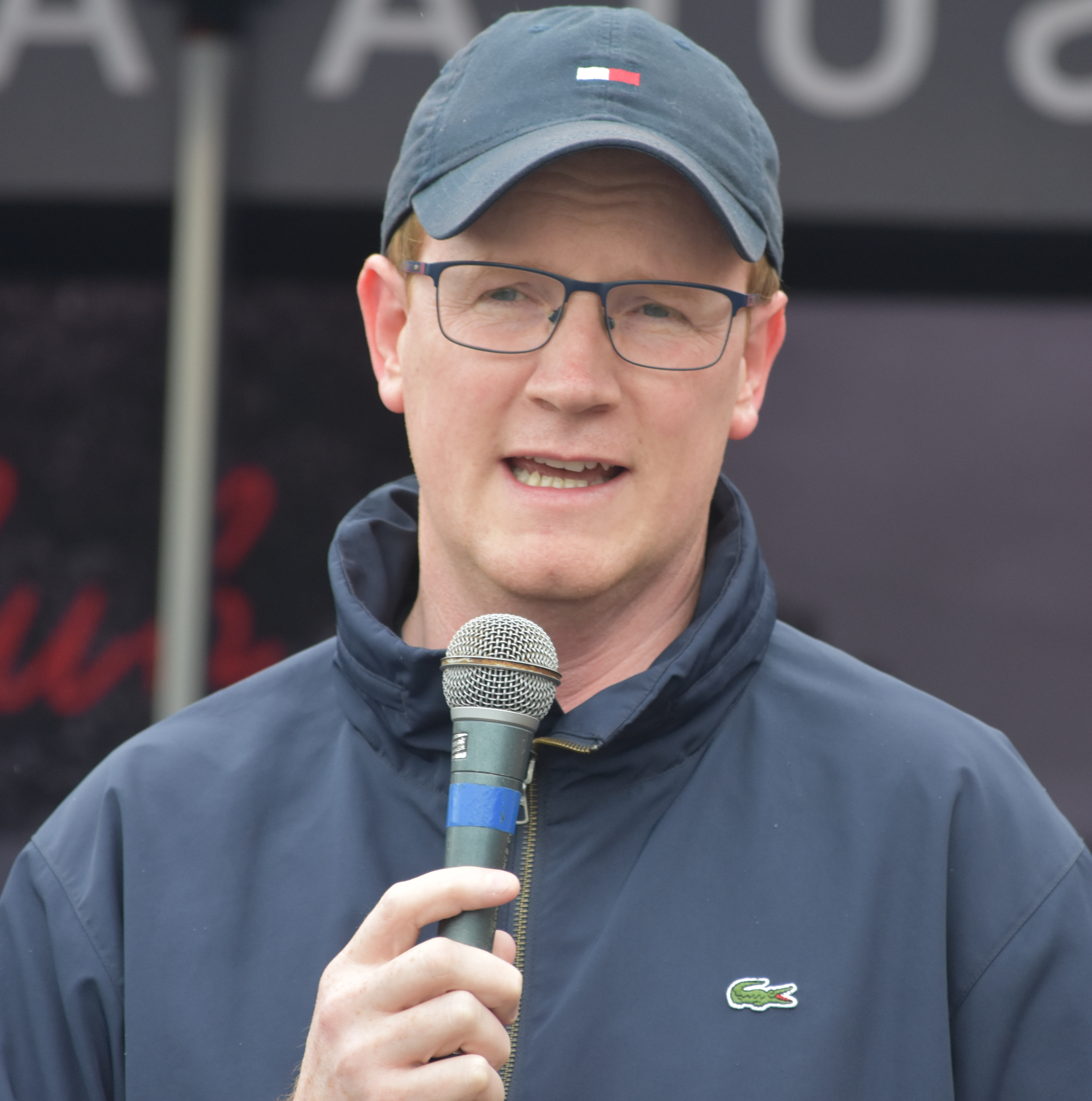
- Marsh in 2025

Member of the Victorian Legislative Assembly for Nepean
- Incumbent
- Assumed office 2 May 2026
- Preceded by: Sam Groth

Mayor of Mornington Peninsula Shire
- In office 19 November 2024 – 2 May 2026
- Preceded by: Simon Brooks
- Succeeded by: Stephen Batty
- In office 16 November 2021 – 15 November 2022
- Preceded by: Despi O'Connor
- Succeeded by: Steve Holland

Personal details
- Born: 1986 or 1987 (age 38–39)
- Party: Liberal

Anthony Marsh (born 1986 or 1987) is an Australian politician who has represented the district of Nepean in the Victorian Legislative Assembly since the 2026 by-election. Marsh is a member of the Liberal Party, and was previously a councillor on Mornington Peninsula Shire, serving as mayor for three years. Before entering politics, Marsh was an officer in the Royal Australian Air Force.

== Early life and education ==
Marsh was born in 1986 or 1987.

He moved with his family to the Mornington Peninsula in his teen years, and attended Dromana Secondary College.

Marsh has a degree in aerospace engineering, and a master of business administration from Melbourne Business School.

He served as a commissioned officer in the Royal Australian Air Force (RAAF) and worked as an aerospace engineer. Marsh subsequently left the RAAF to establish a drone-mapping business.

== Local politics ==
Marsh was first elected to the Mornington Peninsula Shire council at the 2020 local elections, representing the Briars ward. Shortly after his election, Marsh proposed a motion to replace the recitation of a Christian prayer before council meetings with a secular pledge. The motion was passed on 8 December 2020 by a vote of six to five. Marsh was elected as mayor of Mornington Peninsula Shire on 16 November 2021, succeeding Despi O'Connor. In March 2022, he expressed support for the Save Flinders Pier campaign. Marsh was replaced as mayor by Steve Holland on 15 November 2022.

Marsh was re-elected in the Briars ward at the 2024 local elections. On 19 November, at the first meeting of the newly elected council, Marsh was again elected mayor of Mornington Peninsula Shire, succeeding Simon Brooks. Marsh was re-elected as mayor by the council on 18 November 2025.

== State politics ==
Marsh in 2026 during pre-polls

Following the resignation of Liberal MP Sam Groth, a by-election was triggered in the district of Nepean. Marsh joined the Liberal Party on 10 February 2026 to seek preselection as the party's candidate in the by-election. He was subsequently given permission by the party's state executive to stand for preselection as he had otherwise not been a member of the Liberal Party for long enough.

The preselection vote was held among 18 members of the state executive and 6 of the local executive, rather than a vote of all local rank-and-file members. Marsh was successful in his bid for preselection. Following his selection as the Liberal candidate for Nepean, Marsh took unpaid leave from his mayoral and council roles, with Paul Pingiaro, the deputy mayor, serving as acting mayor.

During the campaign, Marsh, alongside Liberal leader Jess Wilson, promised to invest $340 million to rebuild the Rosebud Hospital. Marsh also promised $500,000 in funding for two homelessness services on the Mornington Peninsula, if the Coalition were to win government at the November state election. For a campaign video, Marsh and Wilson filled a pothole in Dromana to highlight a lack of funding for road repairs. This video resulted in a complaint to the Department of Transport and Planning, which ABC News reported was being investigated by the department.

At the 2 May by-election, Marsh was elected as the MP for Nepean. His victory triggered a by-election for the Briars ward. Stephen Batty succeeded Marsh as mayor in June.

Marsh launched a website to report potholes on the Mornington Peninsula in July, called "Labor's Road to Ruin". The website was expanded to include all of Victoria in September, after Premier Ben Carroll announced the state government would fund a similar website to report and track potholes. In July, he used parliamentary privilege to accuse Deon Coote, owner of construction firm Elite Roads, of illegally dumping industrial waste and making payments to Mick Gatto, whom Marsh described as a "underworld crime figure". Elite Roads has denied these allegations and threatened to sue Marsh.

At a candidates forum for the 2026 state election in October, Marsh said he would advocate for roads and housing funding in the area, and would support a full rebuild of the Rosebud Hospital. Earlier in the month, Marsh also reaffirmed his party's promise to rebuild Rosebud Hospital, promising a doubling of bed capacity, with construction to begin in the first term if the Liberal Party forms government. During the campaign, Marsh promised that the Liberal Party would rebuild Flinders Pier if elected to government.

== Personal life ==
Marsh lives on the Mornington Peninsula with his wife and their three children.
