= Tracee Hutchison =

Australian broadcaster

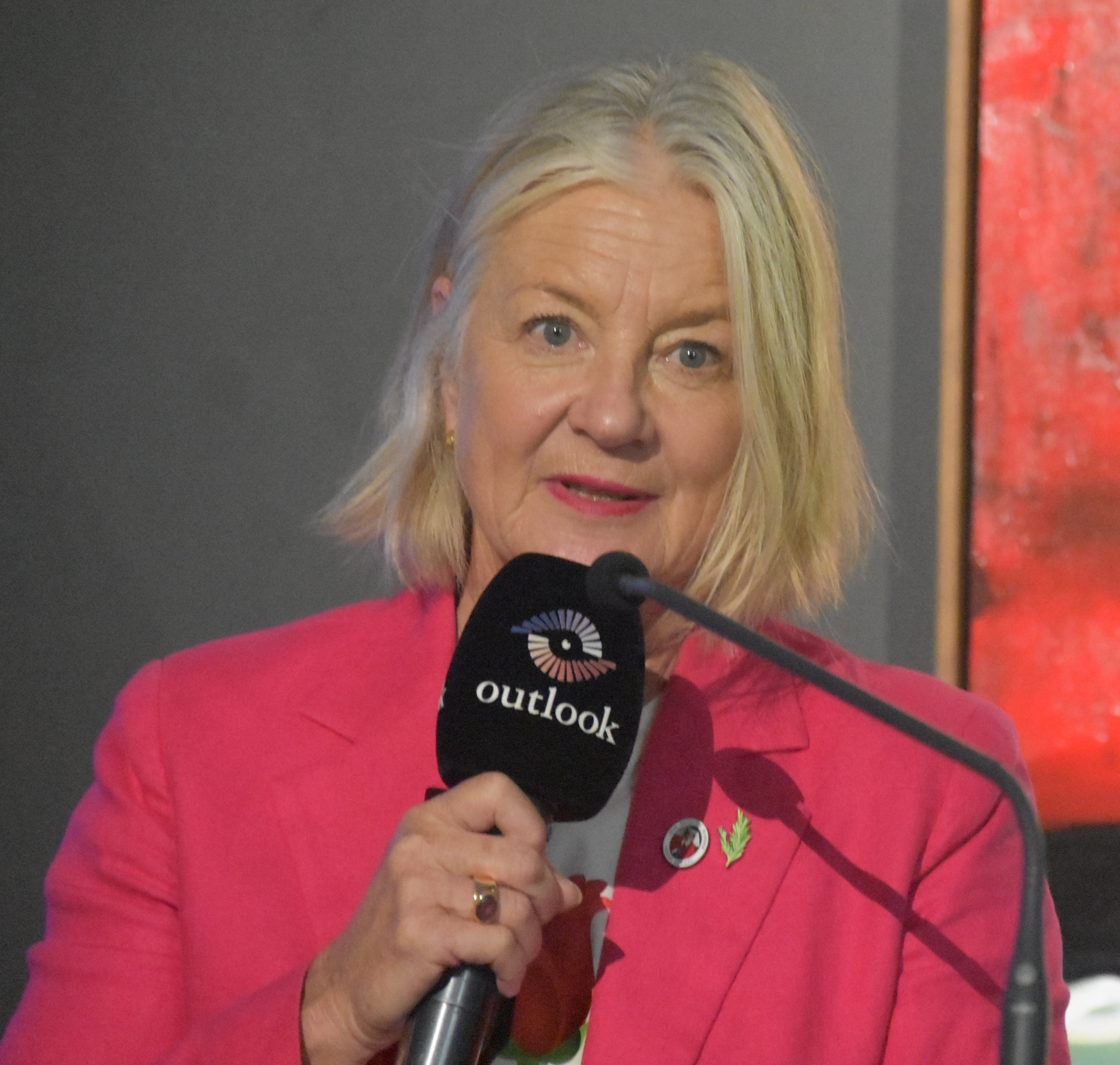
- Hutchison in 2026
- Born: 1962 or 1963 (age 63–64); Rosebud, Australia
- Occupations: TV broadcaster, writer
- Website: www.traceehutchison.com

Tracee Hutchison (born 1962 or 1963) is an Australian writer and TV and radio broadcaster. She contested the 2026 Nepean state by-election as an independent candidate.

== Early life ==
Hutchison was born in Rosebud, Victoria in 1962 or 1963, and attended Toorak College, Mount Eliza on a scholarship.

== Career ==
Hutchison was presenter on The Australian Music Show from 1986, for Triple J.

In 1990 she featured interviews with Australian musicians including Nick Cave, Chrissy Amphlett, David McComb, Paul Kelly and Jimmy Barnes – which became her first book Your Name's on the Door – 10 Years of Australian Music (1992/ABC books). She began her broadcast career at 2SER in Sydney as host of the Australian Independent Music Show.

Hutchison was talent producer and scriptwriter for series 2 and 3 of RocKwiz (SBS TV) and also the series producer of nomad (SBS TV), the program that discovered Silverchair in a national demo competition in 1994.

She has also been a reporter for The 7.30 Report, hosted the ABC2 Music program DIG TV, and was a fill-in presenter for ABC News Breakfast. In 1986 Hutchison worked on the ABC magazine style television show Edge of the Wedge. She has also been a fill in presenter on ABC Radio Melbourne and ABC Radio Sydney. Her radio career began in Melbourne on community radio station 102.7fm 3RRR.

She wrote a weekly opinion column for the Saturday Age from 2005 to 2009 and conceived and edited two fund-raising cookbooks for the Mirabel Foundation: Rock Chefs for Mirabel (1992), featuring Australian musicians Tim Rogers, Tex Perkins, Deborah Conway, Archie Roach & Ruby Hunter and Ed Kuepper and their favorite recipes, and Laughing Stock – Comedy Chefs for Mirabel (2007), featuring Australian comedians Eddie Perfect, Tim Minchin, Dave Hughes, Tripod, Corinne Grant, Libby Gorr and Julia Zemiro.

Hutchison has written on social justice issues, environment and indigenous issues, she was commissioned by The Black Arm Band to write an essay on the history of Aboriginal music for the Hidden Republic performance as part of the 2008 Melbourne International Arts Festival. At the 2019 Australian federal election, Hutchison considered standing as a candidate for the Labor Party in the division of Flinders, but held concerns over the Victorian Labor Party's support at the time for a liquefied natural gas import terminal at Crib Point.

Hutchison stood as an independent candidate in the 2026 Nepean state by-election, and was endorsed by the group Independents for Mornington Peninsula. She was unsuccessful.

Hutchison was interviewed in 2015 by Lawrie Zion, about her career and journalism as a whole. The recording of this interview can be found at the National Library of Australia.

== Writer ==
In 1995 she wrote and starred in her debut one-woman show I Forgive Catriona Rowntree, at the Melbourne Fringe Festival.

== Awards and nominations ==
=== Australian Women in Music Awards ===
The Australian Women in Music Awards is an annual event that celebrates outstanding women in the Australian Music Industry who have made significant and lasting contributions in their chosen field. They commenced in 2018.

Year	Nominee / work	Award	Result
2026	Tracee Hutchison	Special Impact Award	Nominated
