= Chris Brayne =

Australian politician

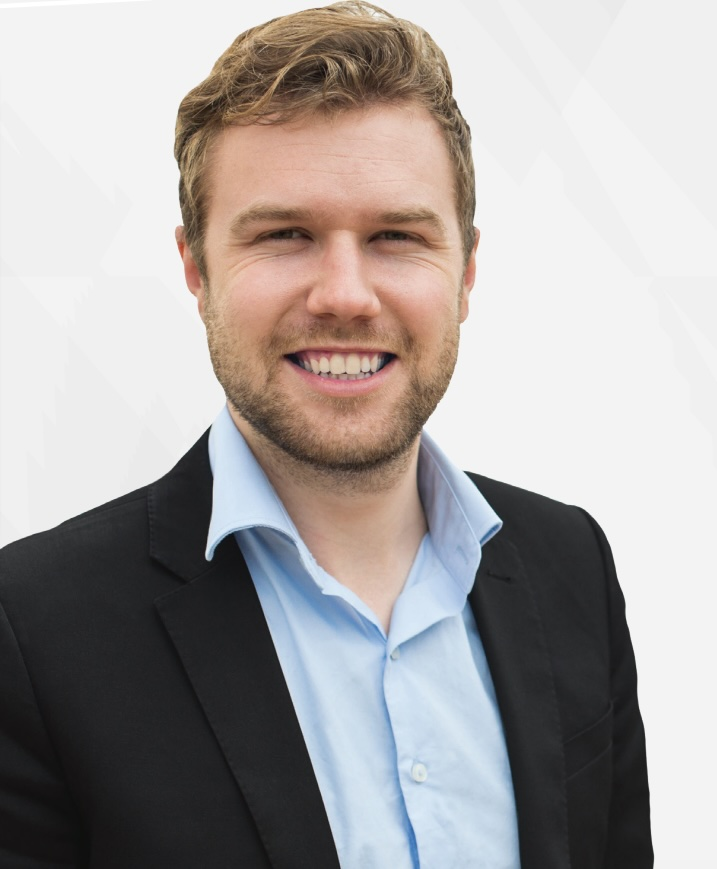

Member of the Victorian Legislative Assembly for Nepean
- In office 24 November 2018 – 26 November 2022
- Preceded by: Martin Dixon
- Succeeded by: Sam Groth

Personal details
- Born: 1993 or 1994 (age 32–33)
- Party: Labor Party

Chris Jon Brayne is an Australian politician. He was a Labor Party member of the Victorian Legislative Assembly from November 2018 to November 2022, representing the seat of Nepean.

In a surprise result, Brayne won the seat at the 2018 election shortly after his 25th birthday. He was the first Labor member to win Nepean or its predecessor since 1982. At the 2022 election, Brayne lost the seat to the Liberal Party's Sam Groth.

Prior to entering parliament, Brayne worked in the electricity industry, as well as holding a weekend job at the Dromana drive-in theatre, in the electorate and for a time in the Democracy Program at The Carter Center in Atlanta.

Parliament of Victoria
Preceded by Martin Dixon	Member for Nepean; 2018–2022	Succeeded by Sam Groth
