= Martin Dixon (politician) =

Australian politician

The Honourable Martin Dixon
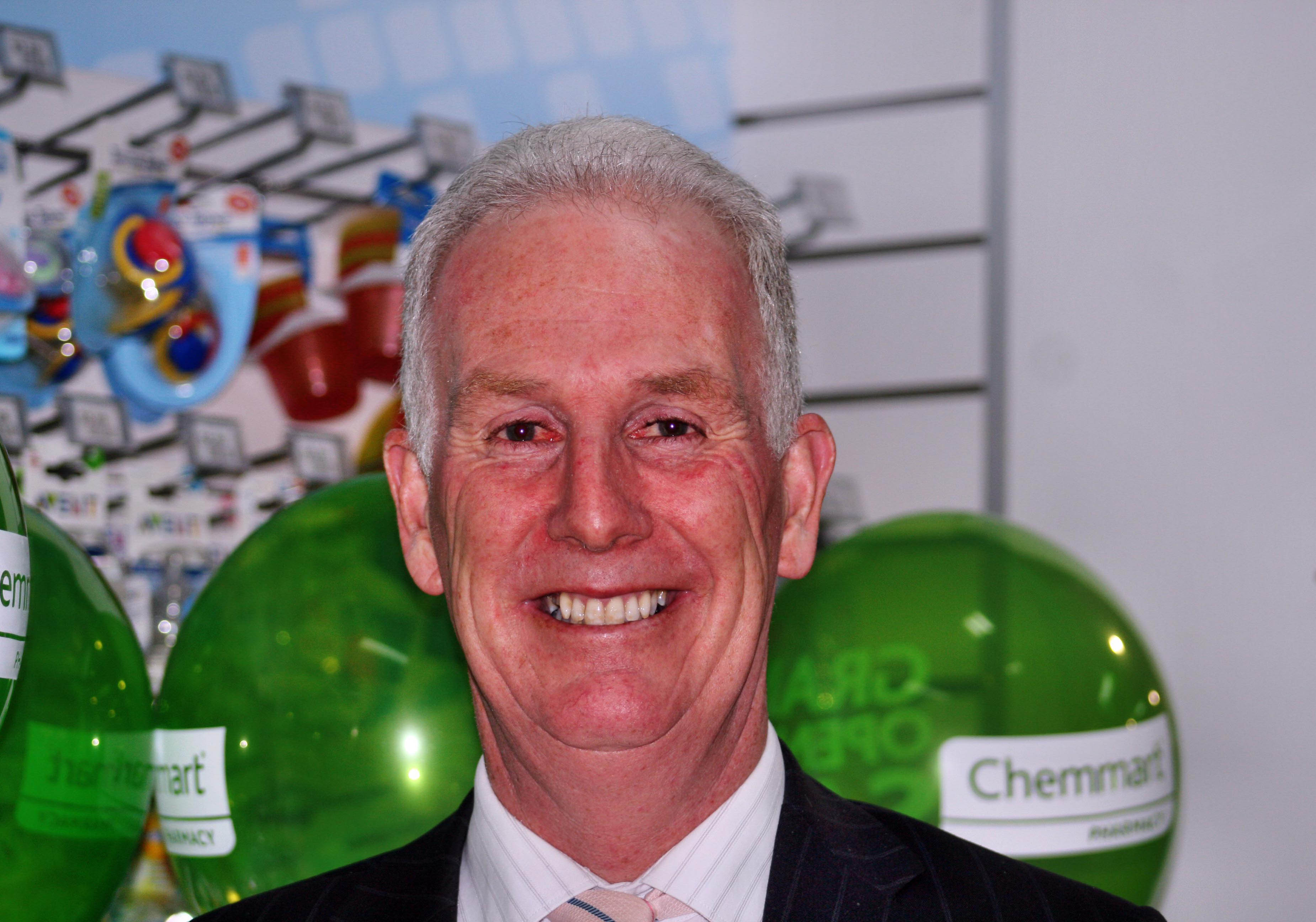

Victorian Minister for Education
- In office 2 December 2010 – 4 December 2014
- Premier: Ted Baillieu; Denis Napthine
- Preceded by: Bronwyn Pike
- Succeeded by: James Merlino

Member of the Victorian Parliament for Dromana
- In office 30 March 1996 – 30 November 2002
- Preceded by: Tony Hyams
- Succeeded by: District abolished

Member of the Victorian Parliament for Nepean
- In office 30 November 2002 – 24 November 2018
- Preceded by: District created
- Succeeded by: Chris Brayne

Personal details
- Born: 29 September 1955 (age 70)
- Party: Liberal Party
- Education: Australian Catholic University and La Trobe University
- Profession: Education
- Website: www.martindixon.org

Martin Francis Dixon (born 29 September 1955) is a former Australian politician. Dixon was a Liberal Party member of the Victorian Legislative Assembly from 1996 to 2018, representing the electorates of Dromana (1996–2002) and Nepean (2002–2018). He was Minister for Education in the Baillieu and Napthine governments from 2010 to 2014.

Dixon has been a member of a number of Joint Parliamentary Committees, as well as holding various portfolio positions in shadow cabinet including Education and Training, Education Services, Skills and Employment, Innovation, Victorian Communities and Veterans Affairs.

== Education ==
Dixon was educated at Marcellin College, the Australian Catholic University and La Trobe University. He holds a Diploma of Teaching and a Bachelor of Education degree. Prior to entering Parliament, he worked as a teacher, a school principal and as Deputy Chairman of Primary Education at the Catholic Education Office in Melbourne.

Victorian Legislative Assembly
Preceded by Tony Hyams	Member for Dromana; 1996–2002	District abolished
District created	Member for Nepean; 2002–2018	Succeeded by Chris Brayne
Political offices
Preceded by Bronwyn Pike	Minister for Education; 2010–2014	Succeeded by James Merlino
