= Opinion polling for the 2026 Victorian state election =

In the lead-up to the 2026 Victorian state election in November 2026, a number of polling companies have conducted opinion polls. These polls collect data on parties' primary vote, leaders' favourability, and individual electoral district results.

== Voting intention ==
=== Legislative Assembly ===
==== 2026 ====
Date	Polling firm	Client	Sample size	Primary vote						2PP vote (Note: Some polling findings include projections of a three-party-preferred vote.)		
Date	Polling firm	Client	Sample size	ALP	L/NP	GRN	ONP	IND	Others	ALP	L/NP	ONP
20 Nov	Lighthouse/Growth Intelligence Centre	Herald Sun	1,221	22%	31%	15%	24%	8%		—N/a	—N/a	—N/a
13–20 Nov	RedBridge/Accent	Australian Financial Review	1,507	22%	33%	15%	23%	7%		42%	58%	—N/a
13–20 Nov	RedBridge/Accent	Australian Financial Review	1,507	22%	33%	15%	23%	7%		50%	—N/a	50%
13 Nov	Lighthouse/Growth Intelligence Centre	Herald Sun	1,351	21%	32%	14%	23%	10%		—N/a	—N/a	—N/a
10–18 Nov	Agenda C Synesis/Antenna	—N/a	1,772	25%	33%	11%	24%	7%		41%	59%	—N/a
10–18 Nov	Agenda C Synesis/Antenna	—N/a	1,772	25%	33%	11%	24%	7%		50%	—N/a	50%
10–18 Nov	Agenda C Synesis/Antenna	—N/a	1,772	25%	33%	11%	24%	7%		—N/a	68%	32%
3–10 Nov	RedBridge/Accent	Australian Financial Review	1,008	23%	31%	15%	22%	9%		43%	57%	—N/a
3–10 Nov	RedBridge/Accent	Australian Financial Review	1,008	23%	31%	15%	22%	9%		55%	—N/a	45%
2-7 Nov	Resolve	The Age	1,000	22%	30%	13%	23%	6%	7%	—N/a	—N/a	—N/a
30 Oct – 5 Nov	DemosAU/Premier National	—N/a	1,562	18%	33%	17%	21%	11%		44%	56%	—N/a
26–29 Oct	Roy Morgan	—N/a	3,610	22.5%	29.5%	12.5%	22%	7.5%	6%	44%	56%	—N/a
26–29 Oct	Roy Morgan	—N/a	3,610	22.5%	29.5%	12.5%	22%	7.5%	6%	54.5%	—N/a	45.5%
26–29 Oct	Roy Morgan	—N/a	3,610	22.5%	29.5%	12.5%	22%	7.5%	6%	—N/a	74%	26%
19 Oct-1 Nov	Lighthouse/Growth Intelligence Centre	Herald Sun	1,289	22%	31%	14%	23%	10%		—N/a	—N/a	—N/a
15–22 Oct	Newspoll	The Australian(subscription required)	1,017	24%	33%	14%	20%	9%		45%	55%	—N/a
14–26 Oct	Online Research Unit	Victorian Greens	1,488	25%	32%	15%	14%	14%		46%	54%	—N/a
8–9 Oct	Roy Morgan	—N/a	—N/a	22.5%	26%	14%	25%	7%	5.5%	45%	55%	—N/a
6-10 Oct	Resolve	The Age	1,000	25%	28%	15%	23%	4%	5%	—N/a	—N/a	—N/a
2–8 Oct	RedBridge/Accent	Australian Financial Review	1,008	24%	30%	16%	24%	6%		44%	56%	—N/a
2–8 Oct	RedBridge/Accent	Australian Financial Review	1,008	24%	30%	16%	24%	6%		55%	—N/a	45%
24–28 Sept	Freshwater	Herald Sun	1,030	24%	29%	14%	22%	11%		47%	53%	—N/a
10–20 Sept	DemosAU/Premier National	—N/a	1,020	25%	30%	14%	20%	11%		48%	52%	—N/a
1–14 Sept	RedBridge/Accent	Australian Financial Review	2,371	24%	29%	15%	25%	7%		44%	56%	—N/a
1–14 Sept	RedBridge/Accent	Australian Financial Review	2,371	24%	29%	15%	25%	7%		53%	—N/a	47%
13 Sept	Resolve	The Age	1,000	25%	28%	12%	23%	13%		—N/a	—N/a	—N/a
16 Aug	Resolve	The Age	1,000	25%	27%	12%	23%	13%		—N/a	—N/a	—N/a
6–11 Aug	DemosAU/Premier National	—N/a	1,007	23%	32%	13%	22%	10%		45%	55%	—N/a
5–7 Aug	Roy Morgan	—N/a	2,084	26%	26%	12.5%	23.5%	8%	4%	49%	51%	—N/a
5–7 Aug	Roy Morgan	—N/a	2,084	26%	26%	12.5%	23.5%	8%	4%	56%	—N/a	44%
5–7 Aug	Roy Morgan	—N/a	2,084	26%	26%	12.5%	23.5%	8%	4%	—N/a	63.5%	36.5%
3 Aug	Warren Pickering becomes state leader of One Nation											
31 Jul–3 Aug	Freshwater	Herald Sun	1,020	25%	30%	14%	22%	9%		48%	52%	—N/a
28 Jul–1 Aug	RedBridge/Accent	Australian Financial Review	1,014	23%	30%	14%	22%	11%		43%	57%	—N/a
28 July	Jacinta Allan resigns as leader of the Labor Party and premier; Ben Carroll is elected leader and premier											
16 Jun – 10 July	YouGov (MRP)	—N/a	4,003	23%	26%	13%	24%	14%		46.2%	53.8%	—N/a
23–26 July	Newspoll	The Australian(subscription required)	1,035	28%	31%	13%	19%	9%		48%	52%	—N/a
14 July	RedBridge/Accent	Australian Financial Review(subscription required)	6,500	26%	26%	12%	27%	8%		—N/a	—N/a	—N/a
12 July	Resolve	The Age	1,000	27%	27%	12%	22%	12%		—N/a	—N/a	—N/a
17–28 June	RedBridge/Accent	Australian Financial Review	5,516	26%	26%	13%	27%	8%		46%	54%	—N/a
17–28 June	RedBridge/Accent	Australian Financial Review	5,516	26%	26%	13%	27%	8%		52%	—N/a	48%
May – Jun	Resolve	The Age	~1,000	26%	26%	12%	24%	12%		—N/a	—N/a	—N/a
7–11 Jun	DemosAU/Premier National	—N/a	1,056	21%	30%	15%	23%	11%		45%	55%	—N/a
5–8 Jun	Freshwater	Herald Sun	1,034	23%	27%	14%	25%	9%		47%	53%	—N/a
2 May	Nepean by-election (Lib hold)											
22–24 April	Roy Morgan	—N/a	1,707	25.5%	24%	13.5%	24.5%	8.5%	4%	51%	49%	—N/a
22–24 April	Roy Morgan	—N/a	1,707	25.5%	24%	13.5%	24.5%	8.5%	4%	53.5%	—N/a	46.5%
22–24 April	Roy Morgan	—N/a	1,707	25.5%	24%	13.5%	24.5%	8.5%	4%	—N/a	59%	41%
Mar – Apr	Resolve	The Age	1,047	27%	29%	10%	21%	13%		—N/a	—N/a	—N/a
19–23 Mar	Freshwater	Herald Sun	1,062	27%	30%	14%	20%	9%		48%	52%	—N/a
18–27 Feb	RedBridge/Accent	—N/a	2,165	25%	28%	13%	24%	10%		48%	52%	—N/a
18–27 Feb	RedBridge/Accent	—N/a	2,165	25%	28%	13%	24%	10%		53%	—N/a	47%
19–23 Feb	Freshwater	Herald Sun	1,030	28%	27%	13%	23%	9%		50%	50%	—N/a
13–16 Feb	Roy Morgan	—N/a	2,462	25.5%	21.5%	13.5%	26.5%	9%	4%	52%	48%	—N/a
13–16 Feb	Roy Morgan	—N/a	2,462	25.5%	21.5%	13.5%	26.5%	9%	4%	52.5%	—N/a	47.5%
13–16 Feb	Roy Morgan	—N/a	2,462	25.5%	21.5%	13.5%	26.5%	9%	4%	—N/a	56%	44%
12–16 Jan & 8–14 Feb	Resolve	The Age	1,100	28%	30%	12%	11%	7%	11%	—N/a	—N/a	—N/a
1–10 Feb	DemosAU/Premier National	—N/a	1,274	23%	29%	15%	21%	12%		47%	53%	—N/a
26 Nov 2022	2022 election			37.0%	34.5%	11.5%	0.3%	5.5%	11.6%	55%	45%	—

==== 2025 ====
Date	Polling firm	Client	Sample size	Primary vote					2PP vote	
Date	Polling firm	Client	Sample size	ALP	L/NP	GRN	IND	Others	ALP	L/NP
24 Nov – 8 Dec 2025	RedBridge/Accent	Australian Financial Review	1,021	31%	40%	12%	6%	11% (Note: 4% for a "minor right-wing party", 2% for a "minor left-wing party" and 5% for other parties.)	50%	50%
7 Dec 2025	Resolve	The Age	1,000	28%	39%	12%	9%	11%	—N/a	—N/a
21–24 Nov 2025	Freshwater	Herald Sun	1,220	30%	37%	15%	—N/a	18%	50%	50%
18–20 Nov 2025	Newspoll	The Australian(subscription required)	1,030	28%	36%	14%	—N/a	22%	49%	51%
18 Nov 2025	Jess Wilson is elected Liberal leader and leader of the Opposition									
14–17 Nov 2025	Freshwater	Herald Sun	1,217	30%	37%	15%	—N/a	18%	49%	51%
21–27 Oct 2025	DemosAU/Premier National	—N/a	1,016	26%	37%	15%	—N/a	22%	49%	51%
8–14 Oct 2025	RedBridge/Accent	Australian Financial Review	1,501	32%	37%	13%	—N/a	18%	52%	48%
12 Oct 2025	Resolve	The Age	1,000	30%	33%	12%	10%	15%	—N/a	—N/a
3–11 Sep 2025	RedBridge/Accent	Herald Sun	2005	32%	37%	13%	—N/a	18%	52%	48%
2–9 Sep 2025	DemosAU/Premier National	—N/a	1327	26%	38%	15%	—N/a	21%	49%	51%
17 Aug 2025	Resolve	The Age	1000	32%	33%	12%	9%	13%	—N/a	—N/a
23–30 Jun 2025	Newspoll	The Australian(subscription required)	1000	35%	35%	12%	—N/a	18%	53%	47%
19–30 Jun 2025	RedBridge/Accent	Herald Sun	1183	33%	38%	14%	—N/a	15%	51.5%	48.5%
24 Mar – 2 Apr 2025	RedBridge/Accent	Herald Sun	2,013	29%	41%	13%	—N/a	17%	49%	51%
30 Mar 2025	Resolve	The Age	1000	24%	41%	14%	14%	7%	—N/a	—N/a
17–21 Mar 2025	DemosAU/Premier National	—N/a	1,006	25%	39%	15%	—N/a	21%	48%	52%
Dec 2024 – Jan 2025	Resolve	The Age	1,124	22%	42%	13%	17%	6%	—N/a	—N/a
26 Nov 2022	2022 election			37.0%	34.5%	11.5%	5.5%	11.6% (Note: 0.3% ONP)	55%	45%

==== 2024 ====
Date	Polling firm	Client	Sample size	Primary vote					2PP vote	
Date	Polling firm	Client	Sample size	ALP	L/NP	GRN	IND	Others	ALP	L/NP
Dec 2024 – Jan 2025	Resolve	The Age	1,124	22%	42%	13%	17%	6%	—N/a	—N/a
27 Dec 2024	Brad Battin becomes Liberal leader and leader of the opposition									
6–20 Nov 2024	RedBridge/Accent	Herald Sun	920	30%	43%	14%	—N/a	13%	49%	51%
10 Nov 2024	Resolve	The Age	1,000	28%	38%	13%	14%	7%	—N/a	—N/a
26 Sep – 3 Oct 2024	RedBridge/Accent	Herald Sun	1,516	30%	40%	12%	—N/a	18%	49%	51%
18 Sep 2024	RedBridge/Accent	Herald Sun	1,500	30%	40%	12%	—N/a	17%	50%	50%
7 Sep 2024	Resolve	The Age	1,054	27%	37%	14%	15%	7%	—N/a	—N/a
6–29 Aug 2024	Wolf & Smith	—N/a	2,024	28%	40%	14%	15%	3%	48%	52%
5 Aug 2024	RedBridge/Accent	Herald Sun	1,514	31%	40%	12%	—N/a	17%	50%	50%
14 Jul 2024	Resolve	The Age	1,000	27%	37%	15%	15%	6%	—N/a	—N/a
7 Jun 2024	RedBridge/Accent	Herald Sun	1,000	35%	38%	14%	—N/a	13%	55%	45%
19 May 2024	Resolve	Herald Sun	1,000	28%	37%	13%	16%	6%	—N/a	—N/a
23 April 2024	Ellen Sandell becomes Greens leader									
24 Mar 2024	Resolve	The Age	1,100	33%	35%	13%	12%	7%	54.6%	45.4%
14–20 Mar 2024	RedBridge/Accent	Herald Sun	1,559	36%	38%	10%	—N/a	16%	54%	46%

==== 2023 ====
Date	Polling firm	Client	Sample size	Primary vote						2PP vote	
Date	Polling firm	Client	Sample size	ALP	L/NP		GRN	IND	Others	ALP	L/NP
Date	Polling firm	Client	Sample size	ALP	LIB	NAT	GRN	IND	Others	ALP	L/NP
2–12 Dec 2023	RedBridge/Accent	Herald Sun	2,000	37%	36%		13%	—N/a	14%	55.9%	44.1%
3 Dec 2023	Resolve	The Age	1,100	37%	31%		11%	14%	6%	—N/a	—N/a
Sep–Oct 2023	Resolve	The Age	1,100	39%	32%		12%	10%	7%	—N/a	—N/a
27 Sep 2023	Jacinta Allan becomes Labor leader and premier										
31 Aug – 14 Sep 2023	RedBridge/Accent	—N/a	3,001	37%	34%		13%	—N/a	16%	56.5%	43.5%
Jul–Aug 2023	Resolve	The Age	1,100	39%	28%		13%	13%	7%	—N/a	—N/a
19–20 Jul 2023	Roy Morgan	—N/a	1,046	33%	35.5%		12.5%	10.5%	8.5% (Note: 1% for Legalise Cannabis, 1% for Animal Justice and 6.5% for other parties.)	53%	47%
May–Jun 2023	Resolve	The Age	1,003	41%	23%	3%	15%	12%	6%	—N/a	—N/a
17–22 May 2023	Roy Morgan	—N/a	2,095	42%	28.5%		12.5%	9%	8% (Note: 1.5% for Legalise Cannabis, 1.5% for Animal Justice and 5% for other parties.)	61.5%	38.5%
19–22 Apr 2023	Resolve	The Age	1,609	42%	30%		10%	12%	5%	—N/a	—N/a
15–18 Feb 2023	Resolve	The Age	825	41%	30%		13%	13%	4%	—N/a	—N/a
8 Dec 2022	John Pesutto becomes Liberal leader and leader of the opposition										
26 Nov 2022	2022 election			37.0%	34.5%		11.5%	5.5%	11.6% (Note: 0.3% ONP)	55%	45%

=== Legislative Council ===
Date	Polling firm	Client	Sample size	Primary vote											
Date	Polling firm	Client	Sample size	ALP	L/NP	GRN	LCV	DLP	LBT	SFF	ONP	FFP	AJP	VS	Others
1–10 Feb 2026	DemosAU/Premier National	—N/a	1,274	19%	28%	14%	5%	1%	1%	1%	20%	2%	4%	1%	4% (Note: 2% for Reform AU, 1% for Sustainable Australia, 1% for the Freedom Party and 0% for the New Democrats.)
21–27 Oct 2025	DemosAU/Premier National	—N/a	1,016	21%	30%	14%	2%	2%	4%	1%	11%	5%	3%	1%	6% (Note: 2% for Companions and Pets, 2% for Sustainable Australia, 1% for the Freedom Party and 1% for the New Democrats.)
26 Nov 2022	2022 election			33.0%	29.4%	10.3%	4.1%	3.5%	2.6%	2.1%	2.0%	2.0%	1.5%	1.4%	8.0%

== Three-party-preferred vote ==
Date	Polling firm	Client	Sample size	3PP vote		
Date	Polling firm	Client	Sample size	ALP	L/NP	ONP
26–29 Oct 2026	Roy Morgan	—N/a	3,610	43%	33%	24%
8–9 Oct 2026	Roy Morgan	—N/a	—N/a	44%	29%	27%
5–7 Aug 2026	Roy Morgan	—N/a	2,084	43.5%	30%	26.5%
17–28 Jun 2026	RedBridge/Accent	Australian Financial Review	5,516	39.9%	30.1%	29.9%
22–24 Apr 2026	Roy Morgan	—N/a	1,707	44.5%	28%	27.5%
13–16 Feb 2026	Roy Morgan	—N/a	2,462	44.5%	26%	29.5%

== Leadership polling ==
=== Preferred premier ===
==== Carroll vs Wilson vs Pickering ====
Date	Polling firm	Client	Sample size	Party leaders				Net	
Date	Polling firm	Client	Sample size	Carroll	Wilson	Pickering	Don't know	Net	
3–10 Nov 2026	RedBridge/Accent	Australian Financial Review	1,008	18%	29%	11%	42%	Net	11%
2–7 Nov 2026	Resolve	The Age	1,000	21%	35%	15%	29%	14%	
30 Oct–5 Nov 2026	DemosAU/Premier National	Herald Sun(subscription required)	1,562	28%	36%	19%	17%	8%	
15–22 Oct 2026	Newspoll	The Australian(subscription required)	1,017	34%	48%	—N/a	18%	14%	
6–10 Oct 2026	Resolve	The Age	1,000	22%	29%	14%	35%	7%	
2–8 Oct 2026	RedBridge/Accent	Australian Financial Review	1,008	19%	28%	8%	45%	9%	
24–28 Sep 2026	Freshwater	Herald Sun	1,030	30%	37%	13%	20%	7%	
13 Sep 2026	Resolve	The Age	1,000	20%	28%	8%	43%	8%	
16 Aug 2026	Resolve	The Age	~1,000	20%	26%	10%	43%	6%	
5–7 Aug 2026	Roy Morgan	—N/a	2,084	46.5%	35.5%	16%	2%	11%	
4 Aug 2026	RedBridge/Accent	Australian Financial Review	1,014	19%	32%	—N/a	49%	13%	
3 Aug 2026	Warren Pickering becomes One Nation leader								
28 Jul 2026	Ben Carroll becomes Labor leader and premier								

==== Allan vs Wilson ====
Date	Polling firm	Client	Sample size	Party leaders			Net
Date	Polling firm	Client	Sample size	Allan	Wilson	Don't know	Net
23–26 Jul 2026	Newspoll	The Australian(subscription required)	1,035	32%	51%	17%	19%
12 July 2026	Resolve	—N/a	1,000	24%	43%	33%	19%
May–Jun 2026	Resolve	The Age	~1,000	20%	39%	41%	19%
5–8 Jun 2026	Freshwater	Herald Sun	1,034	25%	49%	26%	24%
22–24 Apr 2026	Roy Morgan	—N/a	1,707	42%	53%	5%	11%
Mar–Apr 2026	Resolve	The Age	1,047	20%	39%	41%	19%
19–23 Mar 2026	Freshwater	Herald Sun	1,062	31%	47%	22%	16%
19–23 Feb 2026	Freshwater	Herald Sun	1,030	30%	46%	24%	16%
13–16 Feb 2026	Roy Morgan	—N/a	2,462	42.5%	51%	6.5%	8.5%
Jan–Feb 2026	Resolve	The Age	1,100	20%	39%	41%	19%
1–10 Feb 2026	DemosAU/Premier National	—N/a	1,274	31%	40%	29%	9%
7 Dec 2025	Resolve	The Age	1,000	24%	41%	35%	17%
21–24 Nov 2025	Freshwater	Herald Sun	1,220	31%	47%	22%	16%
18–20 Nov 2025	Newspoll	The Australian(subscription required)	1,030	33%	47%	20%	14%
18 Nov 2025	Jess Wilson becomes Liberal leader and leader of the opposition						

==== Allan vs Battin ====
Date	Polling firm	Client	Sample size	Party leaders			Net
Date	Polling firm	Client	Sample size	Allan	Battin	Don't know	Net
14–17 Nov 2025	Freshwater	Herald Sun	1,217	34%	45%	21%	11%
21–27 Oct 2025	DemosAU/Premier National	—N/a	1,016	32%	40%	28%	8%
12 Oct 2025	Resolve	The Age	1,000	27%	33%	40%	6%
2–9 Sep 2025	DemosAU/Premier National	—N/a	1,327	32%	37%	31%	5%
23–30 Jun 2025	Newspoll	The Australian(subscription required)	1,000	36%	41%	23%	5%
30 Mar 2025	Resolve	The Age	1,000	23%	36%	41%	13%
17–21 Mar 2025	DemosAU/Premier National	—N/a	1,006	30%	43%	27%	13%
Dec 2024 – Jan 2025	Resolve	The Age	1,124	27%	36%	37%	9%
27 Dec 2024	Brad Battin becomes Liberal leader and leader of the opposition						

==== Allan vs Pesutto ====
Date	Polling firm	Client	Sample size	Party leaders			Net
Date	Polling firm	Client	Sample size	Allan	Pesutto	Don't know	Net
10 Nov 2024	Resolve	The Age	1,000	29%	30%	41%	1%
7 Sep 2024	Resolve	The Age	1,054	30%	29%	41%	1%
14 Jul 2024	Resolve	The Age	1,000	31%	28%	41%	3%
19 May 2024	Resolve	The Age	1,000	31%	26%	43%	5%
24 Mar 2024	Resolve	The Age	1,100	34%	25%	41%	9%
3 Dec 2023	Resolve	The Age	1,100	34%	22%	44%	12%
Sep–Oct 2023	Resolve	The Age	1,100	38%	19%	43%	19%
27 Sep 2023	Jacinta Allan becomes Labor leader and premier						

==== Andrews vs Pesutto ====
Date	Polling firm	Client	Sample size	Party leaders			Net
Date	Polling firm	Client	Sample size	Andrews	Pesutto	Don't know	Net
Jul–Aug 2023	Resolve	The Age	1,100	41%	32%	27%	9%
19–20 Jul 2023	Roy Morgan	—N/a	1,046	52.5%	47.5%	—N/a	5%
May un 2023	Resolve	The Age	1,003	49%	26%	25%	23%
17–22 May 2023	Roy Morgan	—N/a	2,095	64%	36%	—N/a	28%
19–22 Apr 2023	Resolve	The Age	1,609	49%	28%	23%	21%
15–18 Feb 2023	Resolve	The Age	825	50%	26%	24%	24%
8 Dec 2022	John Pesutto becomes Liberal leader and leader of the opposition						

=== Leadership approval ===
==== Carroll vs Wilson vs Pickering ====
Date	Polling firm	Client	Sample size	Carroll				Wilson				Pickering			
Date	Polling firm	Client	Sample size	Pos.	Neg.	DK	Net	Pos.	Neg.	DK	Net	Pos.	Neg.	DK	Net
13 Nov 2026	Lighthouse/Growth Intelligence Centre	Herald Sun	1,358	—N/a	—N/a	—N/a	−19%	—N/a	—N/a	—N/a	+17%	—N/a	—N/a	—N/a	—N/a
3 – 10 Nov 2026	RedBridge/Accent	Australian Financial Review	1,008	19%	47%	34%	−28%	35%	28%	37%	+7%	17%	25%	36%	−8%
2 – 7 Nov 2026	Resolve	The Age	1,000	—N/a	—N/a	—N/a	−16%	—N/a	—N/a	—N/a	+24%	—N/a	—N/a	—N/a	+9%
30 Oct – 5 Nov 2026	DemosAU/Premier National	—N/a	1,562	17%	47%	36%	−30%	38%	25%	37%	+13%	23%	43%	34%	−20%
15 – 22 Oct 2026	Newspoll	The Australian(subscription required)	1,017	30%	58%	12%	−28%	49%	39%	12%	+10%	—N/a	—N/a	—N/a	—N/a
6 – 10 Oct 2026	Resolve	The Age	1,000	—N/a	—N/a	—N/a	−11%	—N/a	—N/a	—N/a	+23%	—N/a	—N/a	—N/a	—N/a
2 – 8 Oct 2026	RedBridge/Accent	Australian Financial Review	1,008	19%	37%	44%	−18%	35%	18%	47%	+17%	—N/a	—N/a	—N/a	—N/a
24 – 28 Sep 2026	Freshwater	Herald Sun	1,030	—N/a	—N/a	—N/a	−7%	—N/a	—N/a	—N/a	+19%	—N/a	—N/a	—N/a	—N/a
10 – 20 Sep 2026	DemosAU/Premier National	—N/a	1,020	—N/a	—N/a	—N/a	−14%	—N/a	—N/a	—N/a	+8%	—N/a	—N/a	—N/a	—N/a
16 Aug 2026	Resolve	The Age	1,000	—N/a	—N/a	—N/a	−4%	—N/a	—N/a	—N/a	+18%	—N/a	—N/a	—N/a	–
6 – 11 Aug 2026	DemosAU/Premier National	—N/a	1,007	21%	37%	42%	−16%	35%	24%	41%	+11%	19%	38%	43%	−19%
31 Jul – 3 Aug 2026	Roy Morgan	—N/a	2,084	51%	43%	6%	+8%	58.5%	38.5%	3%	+20%	35%	58.5%	6.5%	−23.5%
31 Jul – 3 Aug 2026	Freshwater	Herald Sun	1,020	22%	29%	49%	−7%	39%	21%	40%	+18%	—N/a	—N/a	—N/a	—N/a
28 Jul – 1 Aug 2026	RedBridge/Accent	Australian Financial Review	1,014	14%	29%	57%	−15%	33%	20%	47%	+13%	—N/a	—N/a	—N/a	—N/a
03 Aug 2026	Warren Pickering becomes One Nation leader														
28 Jul 2026	Ben Carroll becomes Labor leader and premier														

==== Allan vs Wilson ====
Date	Polling firm	Client	Sample size	Allan				Wilson			
Date	Polling firm	Client	Sample size	Pos.	Neg.	DK	Net	Pos.	Neg.	DK	Net
23–26 Jul 2026	Newspoll	The Australian(subscription required)	1,035	25%	71%	4%	−46%	47%	39%	14%	+8%
17 – 28 Jun 2026	RedBridge/Accent	Australian Financial Review	5,516	17%	59%	24%	−42%	31%	18%	51%	+13%
7–11 Jun 2026	DemosAU/Premier National	—N/a	1,056	18%	57%	25%	−39%	32%	22%	46%	+10%
5–8 Jun 2026	Freshwater	Herald Sun	1,034	—N/a	—N/a	—N/a	−37%	—N/a	—N/a	—N/a	+15%
22–24 Apr 2026	Roy Morgan	—N/a	1,707	32.5%	66.5%	1%	−34%	48.5%	48.5%	3%	–
19–23 Mar 2026	Freshwater	Herald Sun	1,062	22%	55%	23%	−33%	32%	14%	54%	+18%
19–23 Feb 2026	Freshwater	Herald Sun	1,030	—N/a	—N/a	—N/a	−33%	—N/a	—N/a	—N/a	+15%
13–16 Feb 2026	Roy Morgan	—N/a	2,462	30.5%	67.5%	2%	−37%	53%	42.5%	4.5%	10.5%
1–10 Feb 2026	DemosAU/Premier National	—N/a	1,274	16%	53%	31%	−37%	27%	24%	49%	+3%
18–20 Nov 2025	Newspoll	The Australian(subscription required)	1,000	26%	68%	6%	−42%	32%	31%	37%	+1%
18 Nov 2025	Jess Wilson becomes Liberal leader and leader of the opposition										

==== Allan vs Battin ====
Date	Polling firm	Client	Sample size	Allan				Battin			
Date	Polling firm	Client	Sample size	Pos.	Neg.	DK	Net	Pos.	Neg.	DK	Net
14–17 Nov 2025	Freshwater	Herald Sun	1,217	—N/a	—N/a	—N/a	−28%	—N/a	—N/a	—N/a	+15%
23–30 Jun 2025	Newspoll	The Australian(subscription required)	1,000	30%	61%	9%	−31%	35%	40%	25%	−5%
24 Mar – 2 Apr 2025	RedBridge/Accent	Herald Sun	2,013	16%	51%	33%	−35%	27%	16%	57%	+11%
12–13 Mar 2025	JWS Research	—N/a	—N/a	21%	54%	25%	−33%	—N/a	—N/a	—N/a	—N/a
27 Dec 2024	Brad Battin becomes Liberal leader and leader of the opposition										

==== Allan vs Pesutto ====
Date	Polling firm	Client	Sample size	Allan				Pesutto			
Date	Polling firm	Client	Sample size	Pos.	Neg.	DK	Net	Pos.	Neg.	DK	Net
2–12 Dec 2023	RedBridge/Accent	—N/a	2,000	24%	30%	46%	−6%	16%	29%	55%	−13%
27 Sep 2023	Jacinta Allan becomes Labor leader and premier										

==== Andrews vs Pesutto ====
Date	Polling firm	Client	Sample size	Andrews				Pesutto			
Date	Polling firm	Client	Sample size	Pos.	Neg.	DK	Net	Pos.	Neg.	DK	Net
19–20 Jul 2023	Roy Morgan	—N/a	1,046	45%	55%	—N/a	−10%	—N/a	—N/a	—N/a	—N/a
17–22 May 2023	Roy Morgan	—N/a	2,095	52.5%	47.5%	—N/a	+5%	46.5%	53.5%	—N/a	−7%
8 Dec 2022	John Pesutto becomes Liberal leader and leader of the opposition										

== Sub-state results ==
=== Inner Melbourne ===
Date	Polling firm	Client	Sample size	Primary vote						2PP vote	
Date	Polling firm	Client	Sample size	ALP	L/NP	GRN	ONP	IND	Others	ALP	L/NP
1–10 Feb 2026	DemosAU/Premier National	—N/a	—N/a	23%	28%	23%	15%	—N/a	11%	—N/a	—N/a
24 Nov – 8 Dec 2025	RedBridge/Accent	Australian Financial Review	—N/a	30%	41%	14%	—N/a	7%	8% (Note: 1% for a "minor right-wing party", 4% for a "minor left-wing party" and 5% for other parties.)	50%	50%
21–27 Oct 2025	DemosAU/Premier National	—N/a	—N/a	27%	31%	25%	—N/a	—N/a	17%	57%	43%
2–9 Sep 2025	DemosAU/Premier National	—N/a	—N/a	27%	36%	19%	—N/a	—N/a	18%	52%	48%
6–20 Nov 2024	RedBridge/Accent	Herald Sun	—N/a	28%	41%	17%	—N/a	—N/a	14%	49%	51%

=== Outer Melbourne ===
Date	Polling firm	Client	Sample size	Primary vote						2PP vote	
Date	Polling firm	Client	Sample size	ALP	L/NP	GRN	ONP	IND	Others	ALP	L/NP
1–10 Feb 2026	DemosAU/Premier National	—N/a	—N/a	24%	32%	13%	21%	—N/a	10%	—N/a	—N/a
24 Nov – 8 Dec 2025	Redbridge/Accent	Australian Financial Review	—N/a	34%	38%	11%	—N/a	6%	11% (Note: 3% for a "minor right-wing party", 1% for a "minor left-wing party" and 7% for other parties.)	51%	49%
21–27 Oct 2025	DemosAU	—N/a	—N/a	27%	40%	11%	—N/a	—N/a	22%	46%	54%
2–9 Sep 2025	DemosAU/Premier National	—N/a	—N/a	25%	39%	14%	—N/a	—N/a	21%	47%	53%
6–20 Nov 2024	RedBridge/Accent	Herald Sun	—N/a	31%	42%	15%	—N/a	—N/a	12%	50%	50%

=== Melbourne ===
Date	Polling firm	Client	Sample size	Primary vote						2PP vote		
Date	Polling firm	Client	Sample size	ALP	L/NP	GRN	ONP	IND	Others	ALP	L/NP	ONP
13–16 Feb 2026	Roy Morgan	—N/a	—N/a	26.5%	22%	15%	24%	8%	4.5%	54%	46%	—N/a
13–16 Feb 2026	Roy Morgan	—N/a	—N/a	26.5%	22%	15%	24%	8%	4.5%	55.5%	—N/a	44.5%
13–16 Feb 2026	Roy Morgan	—N/a	—N/a	26.5%	22%	15%	24%	8%	4.5%	—N/a	58.5%	41.5%

=== Provincial ===
Date	Polling firm	Client	Sample size	Primary vote						2PP vote	
Date	Polling firm	Client	Sample size	ALP	L/NP	GRN	ONP	IND	Others	ALP	L/NP
24 Nov – 8 Dec 2025	RedBridge/Accent	Australian Financial Review	—N/a	41%	27%	14%	—N/a	5%	13% (Note: 8% for a "minor right-wing party", 1% for a "minor left-wing party" and 4% for other parties.)	60%	40%

=== Rural ===
Date	Polling firm	Client	Sample size	Primary vote						2PP vote	
Date	Polling firm	Client	Sample size	ALP	L/NP	GRN	ONP	IND	Others	ALP	L/NP
24 Nov – 8 Dec 2025	RedBridge/Accent	Australian Financial Review	—N/a	23%	43%	13%	—N/a	6%	15% (Note: 8% for a "minor right-wing party", 1% for a "minor left-wing party" and 6% for other parties.)	44%	56%

=== Regional/Rural ===
Date	Polling firm	Client	Sample size	Primary vote						2PP vote		
Date	Polling firm	Client	Sample size	ALP	L/NP	GRN	ONP	IND	Others	ALP	L/NP	ONP
13–16 Feb 2026	Roy Morgan	—N/a	—N/a	23.5%	21%	8.5%	34.5%	9.5%	3%	46%	54%	—N/a
13–16 Feb 2026	Roy Morgan	—N/a	—N/a	23.5%	21%	8.5%	34.5%	9.5%	3%	44%	—N/a	56%
13–16 Feb 2026	Roy Morgan	—N/a	—N/a	23.5%	21%	8.5%	34.5%	9.5%	3%	—N/a	48.5%	51.5%
1 – 10 Feb 2026	DemosAU/Premier National	—N/a	—N/a	21%	23%	9%	30%	—N/a	17%	—N/a	—N/a	—N/a
21–27 Oct 2025	DemosAU/Premier National	—N/a	—N/a	22%	39%	10%	—N/a	—N/a	29%	43%	57%	—N/a
2–9 Sep 2025	DemosAU/Premier National	—N/a	—N/a	28%	36%	11%	—N/a	—N/a	26%	48%	52%	—N/a
6–20 Nov 2024	RedBridge/Accent	Herald Sun	—N/a	31%	45%	8%	—N/a	—N/a	16%	46%	54%	—N/a

== Electorate projections (MRP) ==
=== Legislative Assembly ===
45 Assembly seats needed for a majority.

Date	Polling firm	Client	Projection type	Sample size	Seat tally						Majority
Date	Polling firm	Client	Projection type	Sample size	ALP	L/NP		GRN	ONP	IND	Majority
Date	Polling firm	Client	Projection type	Sample size	ALP	LIB	NAT	GRN	ONP	IND	Majority
March 2026 - September 2026	Roy Morgan	N/A	MRP	7,708	40	31		6	11	0	Hung (ALP 5 short)
July 2026	YouGov	Common Threads	MRP	4,003	29	31	8	3	17	0	Hung (L/NP 6 short)
26 November 2022	Election				56	19	9	4	0	0	ALP 12

=== Legislative Council ===
21 Council seats needed for a majority.

Date	Polling firm	Client	Projection type	Sample size	Seat tally							Majority
Date	Polling firm	Client	Projection type	Sample size	ALP	L/NP		GRN	ONP	Others	UND	Majority
Date	Polling firm	Client	Projection type	Sample size	ALP	LIB	NAT	GRN	ONP	Others	UND	Majority
July – September 2026	Roy Morgan	—N/a	—N/a		10	12		8	6		4	—N/a
5–7 August 2026	Roy Morgan	—N/a	—N/a	2,084	9	11		2	10	1	7	—N/a
26 November 2022	Election				15	12	2	4	1	6	—N/a	—N/a

== Subpopulation results ==
=== By gender ===
==== Women ====
Date	Polling firm	Client	Sample size	Primary vote						2PP vote		
Date	Polling firm	Client	Sample size	ALP	L/NP	GRN	ONP	IND	Others	ALP	L/NP	ONP
6–11 Aug 2026	DemosAU/Premier National	—N/a	—N/a	20%	37%	15%	18%	—N/a	10%	—N/a	—N/a	—N/a
7–11 Jun 2026	DemosAU/Premier National	—N/a	—N/a	20%	27%	19%	21%	—N/a	13%	—N/a	—N/a	—N/a
13–16 Feb 2026	Roy Morgan	—N/a	—N/a	28.5%	19.5%	16%	22%	10%	4%	58.5%	41.5%	—N/a
13–16 Feb 2026	Roy Morgan	—N/a	—N/a	28.5%	19.5%	16%	22%	10%	4%	60.5%	—N/a	39.5%
13–16 Feb 2026	Roy Morgan	—N/a	—N/a	28.5%	19.5%	16%	22%	10%	4%	—N/a	59.5%	40.5%
1 – 10 Feb 2026	DemosAU/Premier National	—N/a	—N/a	22%	28%	18%	21%	—N/a	11%	—N/a	—N/a	—N/a
7 Dec 2025	Resolve	The Age	—N/a	28%	36%	16%	—N/a	10%	10%	—N/a	—N/a	—N/a
24 Nov – 8 Dec 2025	RedBridge/Accent	Australian Financial Review	—N/a	28%	37%	14%	—N/a	7%	14% (Note: 6% for a "minor right-wing party", 3% for a "minor left-wing party" and 5% for other parties.)	51%	49%	—N/a
21–27 Oct 2025	DemosAU/Premier National	—N/a	—N/a	24%	36%	19%	—N/a	—N/a	21%	50%	50%	—N/a
8–14 Oct 2025	RedBridge/Accent	Australian Financial Review	—N/a	30%	36%	14%	—N/a	—N/a	20%	52%	48%	—N/a
12 Oct 2025	Resolve	The Age	—N/a	27%	32%	13%	—N/a	11%	17%	—N/a	—N/a	—N/a
2–9 Sep 2025	DemosAU/Premier National	—N/a	—N/a	26%	33%	19%	—N/a	—N/a	23%	52%	48%	—N/a
17 Aug 2025	Resolve	The Age	—N/a	32%	28%	16%	—N/a	10%	14%	—N/a	—N/a	—N/a
6–20 Nov 2024	RedBridge/Accent	Herald Sun	—N/a	28%	42%	16%	—N/a	—N/a	14%	49%	51%	—N/a

==== Men ====
Date	Polling firm	Client	Sample size	Primary vote						2PP vote		
Date	Polling firm	Client	Sample size	ALP	L/NP	GRN	ONP	IND	Others	ALP	L/NP	ONP
6–11 Aug 2026	DemosAU/Premier National	—N/a	—N/a	25%	28%	11%	25%	—N/a	11%	—N/a	—N/a	—N/a
7–11 Jun 2026	DemosAU/Premier National	—N/a	—N/a	21%	33%	12%	24%	—N/a	10%	—N/a	—N/a	—N/a
13–16 Feb 2026	Roy Morgan	—N/a	—N/a	23%	24.5%	11%	30.5%	7%	4%	45%	55%	—N/a
13–16 Feb 2026	Roy Morgan	—N/a	—N/a	23%	24.5%	11%	30.5%	7%	4%	44.5%	—N/a	55.5%
13–16 Feb 2026	Roy Morgan	—N/a	—N/a	23%	24.5%	11%	30.5%	7%	4%	—N/a	52.5%	47.5%
1–10 Feb 2026	DemosAU/Premier National	—N/a	—N/a	25%	30%	12%	21%	—N/a	12%	—N/a	—N/a	—N/a
7 Dec 2025	Resolve	The Age	—N/a	29%	43%	9%	—N/a	8%	11%	—N/a	—N/a	—N/a
24 Nov – 8 Dec 2025	RedBridge/Accent	Australian Financial Review	—N/a	33%	42%	11%	—N/a	5%	9% (Note: 3% for a "minor right-wing party", 1% for a "minor left-wing party" and 5% for other parties.)	49%	51%	—N/a
21–27 Oct 2025	DemosAU/Premier National	—N/a	—N/a	28%	39%	11%	—N/a	—N/a	22%	47%	53%	—N/a
8–14 Oct 2025	RedBridge/Accent	Australian Financial Review	—N/a	35%	41%	11%	—N/a	—N/a	13%	51%	49%	—N/a
12 Oct 2025	Resolve	The Age	—N/a	34%	34%	10%	—N/a	9%	13%	—N/a	—N/a	—N/a
2–9 Sep 2025	DemosAU/Premier National	—N/a	—N/a	27%	43%	11%	—N/a	—N/a	20%	44%	56%	—N/a
17 Aug 2025	Resolve	The Age	—N/a	31%	39%	8%	—N/a	9%	13%	—N/a	—N/a	—N/a
6–20 Nov 2024	RedBridge/Accent	Herald Sun	—N/a	32%	43%	12%	—N/a	—N/a	13%	49%	51%	—N/a

=== By age ===
==== 18–34 ====
Date	Polling firm	Client	Sample size	Primary vote						2PP vote		
Date	Polling firm	Client	Sample size	ALP	L/NP	GRN	ONP	IND	Others	ALP	L/NP	ONP
6–11 Aug 2026	DemosAU/Premier National	—N/a	—N/a	24%	22%	30%	17%	—N/a	7%	—N/a	—N/a	—N/a
7–11 Jun 2026	DemosAU/Premier National	—N/a	—N/a	25%	18%	33%	16%	—N/a	8%	—N/a	—N/a	—N/a
13–16 Feb 2026	Roy Morgan	—N/a	—N/a	28.5%	20%	14.5%	25%	9%	3%	56.5%	43.5%	—N/a
13–16 Feb 2026	Roy Morgan	—N/a	—N/a	28.5%	20%	14.5%	25%	9%	3%	55.5%	—N/a	44.5%
13–16 Feb 2026	Roy Morgan	—N/a	—N/a	28.5%	20%	14.5%	25%	9%	3%	—N/a	56.5%	43.5%
1–10 Feb 2026	DemosAU/Premier National	—N/a	—N/a	26%	21%	35%	9%	—N/a	9%	—N/a	—N/a	—N/a
7 Dec 2025	Resolve	The Age	—N/a	28%	37%	20%	—N/a	7%	7%	—N/a	—N/a	—N/a
21–27 Oct 2025	DemosAU/Premier National	—N/a	—N/a	30%	23%	31%	—N/a	—N/a	16%	65%	35%	—N/a
12 Oct 2025	Resolve	The Age	—N/a	39%	20%	20%	—N/a	13%	9%	—N/a	—N/a	—N/a
17 Aug 2025	Resolve	The Age	—N/a	39%	20%	25%	—N/a	10%	6%	—N/a	—N/a	—N/a
6–20 Nov 2024	RedBridge/Accent	Herald Sun	—N/a	31%	26%	29%	—N/a	—N/a	14%	64%	36%	—N/a

==== 35–54 ====
Date	Polling firm	Client	Sample size	Primary vote						2PP vote	
Date	Polling firm	Client	Sample size	ALP	L/NP	GRN	ONP	IND	Others	ALP	L/NP
6–11 Aug 2026	DemosAU/Premier National	—N/a	—N/a	21%	31%	12%	24%	—N/a	12%	—N/a	—N/a
7–11 Jun 2026	DemosAU/Premier National	—N/a	—N/a	19%	30%	13%	28%	—N/a	10%	—N/a	—N/a
1–10 Feb 2026	DemosAU/Premier National	—N/a	—N/a	23%	26%	14%	23%	—N/a	14%	—N/a	—N/a
7 Dec 2025	Resolve	The Age	—N/a	30%	32%	13%	—N/a	10%	14%	—N/a	—N/a
21–27 Oct 2025	DemosAU/Premier National	—N/a	—N/a	27%	34%	19%	—N/a	—N/a	20%	53%	47%
12 Oct 2025	Resolve	The Age	—N/a	30%	29%	14%	—N/a	11%	17%	—N/a	—N/a
17 Aug 2025	Resolve	The Age	—N/a	35%	27%	12%	—N/a	10%	16%	—N/a	—N/a

==== 55–64 ====
Date	Polling firm	Client	Sample size	Primary vote						2PP vote		
Date	Polling firm	Client	Sample size	ALP	L/NP	GRN	ONP	IND	Others	ALP	L/NP	ONP
13–16 Feb 2026	Roy Morgan	—N/a	—N/a	25.5%	23%	11%	27%	9%	4.5%	50%	50%	—N/a
13–16 Feb 2026	Roy Morgan	—N/a	—N/a	25.5%	23%	11%	27%	9%	4.5%	49.5%	—N/a	50.5%
13–16 Feb 2026	Roy Morgan	—N/a	—N/a	25.5%	23%	11%	27%	9%	4.5%	—N/a	54.5%	45.5%

==== 65+ ====
Date	Polling firm	Client	Sample size	Primary vote						2PP vote		
Date	Polling firm	Client	Sample size	ALP	L/NP	GRN	ONP	IND	Others	ALP	L/NP	ONP
13–16 Feb 2026	Roy Morgan	—N/a	—N/a	23%	24%	12.5%	27%	9%	4.5%	49.5%	50.5%	—N/a
13–16 Feb 2026	Roy Morgan	—N/a	—N/a	23%	24%	12.5%	27%	9%	4.5%	51%	—N/a	49%
13–16 Feb 2026	Roy Morgan	—N/a	—N/a	23%	24%	12.5%	27%	9%	4.5%	—N/a	56%	44%

=== By generation ===
==== Generation Z ====
Date	Polling firm	Client	Sample size	Primary vote						2PP vote	
Date	Polling firm	Client	Sample size	ALP	L/NP	GRN	ONP	IND	Others	ALP	L/NP
24 Nov – 8 Dec 2025	Redbridge/Accent	Australian Financial Review	—N/a	35%	20%	28%	—N/a	5%	12% (Note: 3% for a "minor right-wing party", 3% for a "minor left-wing party" and 6% for other parties.)	68%	32%

==== Millennials ====
Date	Polling firm	Client	Sample size	Primary vote						2PP vote	
Date	Polling firm	Client	Sample size	ALP	L/NP	GRN	ONP	IND	Others	ALP	L/NP
24 Nov – 8 Dec 2025	Redbridge/Accent	Australian Financial Review	—N/a	35%	32%	16%	—N/a	6%	11% (Note: 3% for a "minor right-wing party", 2% for a "minor left-wing party" and 6% for other parties.)	58%	42%

==== Generation X ====
Date	Polling firm	Client	Sample size	Primary vote						2PP vote	
Date	Polling firm	Client	Sample size	ALP	L/NP	GRN	ONP	IND	Others	ALP	L/NP
24 Nov – 8 Dec 2025	Redbridge/Accent	Australian Financial Review	—N/a	28%	38%	10%	—N/a	7%	17% (Note: 6% for a "minor right-wing party", 5% for a "minor left-wing party" and 6% for other parties.)	49%	51%

==== Baby boomers ====
Date	Polling firm	Client	Sample size	Primary vote						2PP vote	
Date	Polling firm	Client	Sample size	ALP	L/NP	GRN	ONP	IND	Others	ALP	L/NP
24 Nov – 8 Dec 2025	Redbridge/Accent	Australian Financial Review	—N/a	27%	54%	4%	—N/a	6%	9% (Note: 4% for a "minor right-wing party", 1% for a "minor left-wing party" and 4% for other parties.)	37%	63%

=== By language ===
==== Only English spoken at home ====
Date	Polling firm	Client	Sample size	Primary vote						2PP vote	
Date	Polling firm	Client	Sample size	ALP	L/NP	GRN	ONP	IND	Others	ALP	L/NP
6–11 Aug 2026	DemosAU/Premier National	—N/a	—N/a	22%	32%	13%	24%	—N/a	9%	—N/a	—N/a

==== Other language spoken at home ====
Date	Polling firm	Client	Sample size	Primary vote						2PP vote	
Date	Polling firm	Client	Sample size	ALP	L/NP	GRN	ONP	IND	Others	ALP	L/NP
6–11 Aug 2026	DemosAU/Premier National	—N/a	—N/a	24%	34%	14%	13%	—N/a	15%	—N/a	—N/a

== Individual seat polling ==
=== Hawthorn ===
Date	Polling firm	Client	Sample size	Primary vote							2PP vote	
Date	Polling firm	Client	Sample size	LIB	ALP	IND	GRN	FFP	AJP	Others	LIB	ALP
14–16 Aug 2025	Freshwater (Note: Commissioned by a "group of Liberal Party members opposed to the bailout of John Pesutto".)	Liberal Party	1147	41%	—N/a	—N/a	—N/a	—N/a	—N/a	—N/a	45%	55%
26 Nov 2022	2022 election			42.3%	22.1%	20.0%	11.1%	1.5%	0.9%	2.1%	51.7%	48.3%
