= Leadership spill =

Australian declaration of a vacant leadership

In Australian politics, a leadership spill (or simply a spill) is a declaration that the leadership of a parliamentary party is vacant and open for contest. A spill may involve all or some of the leadership positions (leader and deputy leader in both houses). Where a rival to the existing leader calls for a spill it may also be called a leadership challenge. When successful, it is often said that the former leader has been "rolled". In Australian English the colloquial use of the word "spill" seems to have begun in the mid-1940s with the contest to replace Prime Minister John Curtin after his death in office on 5 July 1945.

When a leadership vacancy arises due to the voluntary resignation or death of the incumbent, the resulting leadership ballot may not be popularly called a leadership spill. For example, after the 1968 disappearance of Harold Holt, the four-candidate Liberal Party leadership ballot was not known as a leadership spill. If the party in question is in government, the election of a new leader will result in a new prime minister, premier or chief minister; if the party is the opposition, the election of a new leader will result in a new opposition leader.

There were 72 leadership spills between 1970 and 2015; the phenomenon became increasingly common in the early 21st century. None occurred in the 1960s, 10 in the 1970s, 18 in the 1980s, 13 in the 1990s, and 31 between 2000 and 2015. Spills are three times more likely to occur when a party is in opposition compared to when it holds government. The frequent leadership spills and political instability in the early 21st century – which saw five changes of Prime Ministers between 2010 and 2018 – has led to Australia being dubbed the "coup capital of the democratic world" during that period. (Note: In 2022 the United Kingdom took over the "democratic coup capital" mantle following the resignation of Liz Truss, overtaking Australia's record.)

== Process ==
In the Westminster system of government, the leader of the party which forms government becomes the prime minister, while the leader of the largest party not in government becomes leader of the Opposition. Contenders for the role of leader of a major party usually (but not always) come from the cabinet or shadow cabinet.

A leadership spill occurs when a member or members of the parliamentary party feel that the leader is taking the party in an undesirable direction or is simply not delivering on promises made to those who elected the leader, and does not have the numbers to back his or her position. A spill may be triggered by consistently poor opinion polls.

A spill can be initiated by the party leader in office, usually in the hope of gaining a fresh mandate to quell dissenting voices in the party. It may occur at any time, leaving the person in the leadership position always 'on notice'.

=== Federal ALP changes ===
Following his return to the leadership of the Australian Labor Party in 2013, Prime Minister Kevin Rudd sought changes to the party's rules so that leadership spills would be more difficult to launch in future. The changes included the requirement for 75% support within the Australian Labor Party Caucus for a special leadership ballot against a sitting Labor prime minister, or 60% against an opposition leader. Another change was that future leadership ballots would include equally weighted voting rights between the caucus and party rank and file members with each block being counted separately and worth 50% of the total.

The rule that a Labor prime minister can only be removed if 75 per cent of MPs agree to force a ballot (or 60 per cent of caucus for an opposition leader) is a caucus-approved rule and was not included in the 2018 National Platform.

=== Federal Liberal Party changes ===
Following the oustings of two Liberal prime minister in 3 years, Scott Morrison, who won the leadership spill of 24 August 2018 introduced a new threshold to trigger a Liberal Party leadership change in government, requiring two-thirds of the partyroom vote to trigger a spill motion. The change was introduced at an hour long party room meeting on the evening of 3 December 2018. Morrison said the changes, which were drafted with feedback from former prime ministers John Howard and Tony Abbott, would only apply to leaders who lead the party to victory at a federal election.

== Impact ==
Historically, a governing party's replacement of its leader fails to improve its electoral fortunes. Across state and federal politics between 1970 and 2014, over 90% of governing parties that replaced their leader lost their majority at the subsequent election. The chances of success are higher when the party is in opposition, leading to success at the subsequent election about 50% of the time.

== Notable spill motions ==
The following spill motions occurred during a parliamentary term, rather than in the aftermath of an election loss. Colours denote the party holding the leadership spill motion. Blue represents the Liberal Party, red the Labor Party, and green the National Party.

=== Federal ===
Spill date	Party	Status	Incumbent	Contenders	Outcome
2 March 1931	Labor	Government	James Scullin	James Scullin (Prime Minister); Jack Beasley (Assistant Minister for Industry)	During the 1931 Labor Party split, Prime Minister James Scullin was challenged by Jack Beasley of the Lang Labor faction, winning by 40 votes to five with seven abstentions.
27 April 1966	Labor	Opposition	Arthur Calwell	Arthur Calwell (Opposition Leader); Gough Whitlam (Deputy Leader)	Calwell defeated Whitlam by 49 votes to 25 after promising to resign if Labor did not win the November 1966 federal election.
30 April 1968	Labor	Opposition	Gough Whitlam	Gough Whitlam (Opposition Leader); Jim Cairns	Whitlam called a spill after conflict with the National Executive. He defeated Cairns by 38 votes to 32.
10 March 1971	Liberal	Government	John Gorton	William McMahon (Foreign Minister); Billy Snedden (Minister for Labour and National Service)	Prime Minister John Gorton had faced a leadership challenge in November 1969 and prevailed. At the vote, he retained the leadership of the Liberal Party after a leadership spill resulted in a 33–33 tie. However, Gorton then resigned, saying that a tie was not a vote of confidence. He did not contest the ensuing ballot, and McMahon defeated Snedden to become his successor.
31 May 1977	Labor	Opposition	Gough Whitlam	Gough Whitlam (Opposition Leader); Bill Hayden (Shadow Treasurer)	Whitlam defeated Hayden by 32 votes to 30.
8 April 1982	Liberal	Government	Malcolm Fraser	Malcolm Fraser (Prime Minister); Andrew Peacock (Backbencher, previously Foreign Minister)	Fraser beat Peacock's challenge for the leadership of the Liberal Party, 54–27 votes.
16 July 1982	Labor	Opposition	Bill Hayden	Bill Hayden (Opposition Leader); Bob Hawke (Shadow Minister for Industrial Relations, Employment and Youth)	Hayden beat Hawke to retain the leadership of the Labor Party, 42–37 but resigned in February 1983 in Hawke's favor, just one month before the ALP returned to government in the 1983 federal election.
9 May 1989	Liberal	Opposition	John Howard	John Howard (Opposition Leader); Andrew Peacock (Deputy Leader)	Peacock won the Liberal leadership with 44 votes to Howard's 27, becoming leader for the second time.
9 May 1989	National	Opposition (coalition with Liberal Party)	Ian Sinclair	Ian Sinclair (Party Leader); Charles Blunt (Shadow Minister)	The National Party held a spill on the same day as their Liberal Party colleagues, resulting in Charles Blunt replacing Ian Sinclair as leader.
3 June 1991	Labor	Government	Bob Hawke	Bob Hawke (Prime Minister); Paul Keating (Deputy Prime Minister and Treasurer)	Following Hawke's failure to honour the Kirribilli Agreement of 1988 in which he promised to hand over the Labor leadership to Keating, Keating challenged Hawke. He lost by 44 votes to Hawke's 66. He resigned to the backbench.
20 December 1991	Labor	Government	Bob Hawke	Bob Hawke (Prime Minister); Paul Keating (Backbencher)	With Hawke's public support having fallen to record lows, Keating launched a second leadership challenge. That effort was successful, with Keating winning the Labor leadership by 5 votes, 56–51. The ballot papers for both 1991 spills were preserved by the returning officer and are kept by the Museum of Australian Democracy at Old Parliament House.
23 May 1994	Liberal	Opposition	John Hewson	John Hewson (Opposition Leader); Alexander Downer (Shadow Treasurer)	Downer won 43 votes against Hewson's 36 votes for the Liberal party leadership, with Peter Costello elected unopposed to replace Michael Wooldridge as deputy.
16 June 2003	Labor	Opposition	Simon Crean	Simon Crean (Opposition Leader); Kim Beazley (Backbencher and former Opposition Leader)	Crean defeated Beazley's challenge 58–34.
2 December 2003	Labor	Opposition	Simon Crean	Kim Beazley (Backbencher and former Opposition Leader); Mark Latham (Shadow Treasurer)	Following a poor poll performance, Crean was urged to step down by senior colleagues. He agreed to do so on 28 November 2003. The ballot was held on Tuesday 2 December in which Latham defeated Beazley by a margin of two votes (47-45).
4 December 2006	Labor	Opposition	Kim Beazley	Kim Beazley (Opposition Leader); Kevin Rudd (Shadow Foreign Minister)	Labor frontbencher Kevin Rudd launched a challenge against Beazley, prompting Beazley to call a spill for all leadership positions within the party. Rudd won the Labor leadership 49–39.
16 September 2008	Liberal	Opposition	Brendan Nelson	Brendan Nelson (Opposition Leader); Malcolm Turnbull (Shadow Treasurer)	Turnbull succeeded in his challenge to Nelson, 45–41.
1 December 2009	Liberal	Opposition	Malcolm Turnbull	Malcolm Turnbull (Opposition Leader); Joe Hockey (Shadow Treasurer); Tony Abbott (Backbencher who had resigned shortly beforehand as Shadow Minister for Families, Community Services and Indigenous Affairs)	On 26 November 2009, following division within the Liberal-National coalition about carbon emissions trading, Kevin Andrews moved a spill motion against Turnbull's leadership, which was defeated by a vote of 48 to 35. Abbott announced on 27 November—one day after Turnbull survived Kevin Andrews' spill motion—that he would challenge Turnbull for the leadership. Abbott committed to withdrawing his candidacy if Joe Hockey was to challenge. He changed his position after Hockey refused to oppose an emissions trading scheme outright and suggested a conscience vote on the Rudd government's proposed Carbon Pollution Reduction Scheme. Hockey was eliminated in the first round of voting. Abbott defeated Turnbull with a narrow margin of 42–41 votes.
24 June 2010	Labor	Government	Kevin Rudd	Julia Gillard (Deputy Prime Minister)	First term Labor Prime Minister Kevin Rudd was replaced by his deputy Julia Gillard, months prior to the 2010 federal election.
27 February 2012	Labor	Government	Julia Gillard	Julia Gillard (Prime Minister); Kevin Rudd (foreign minister and former prime minister)	Kevin Rudd resigned as Foreign Minister seeking to overturn the 2010 spill result but Julia Gillard retained the Labor leadership with 71 votes to Rudd's 31. Rudd moved to the backbench.
21 March 2013	Labor	Government	Julia Gillard	Julia Gillard (Prime Minister)	Julia Gillard called a snap ballot following Simon Crean publicly calling for a Labor leadership ballot. Former prime minister Kevin Rudd vowed not to stand in the challenge, and as a result Julia Gillard was re-elected unopposed.
26 June 2013	Labor	Government	Julia Gillard	Julia Gillard (Prime Minister); Kevin Rudd (backbencher and former prime minister)	Rudd retook the Labor Party leadership in a snap spill, defeating Julia Gillard by a 57–45 margin. Gillard resigned from Parliament at the subsequent 2013 federal election in which the Rudd's Government was defeated by Abbott's Coalition.
9 February 2015	Liberal	Government	Tony Abbott	Tony Abbott (Prime Minister)	A motion to bring about a leadership spill in the Liberal Party was defeated 61–39, with Tony Abbott remaining as prime minister.
14 September 2015	Liberal	Government	Tony Abbott	Tony Abbott (Prime Minister); Malcolm Turnbull (Minister for Communications and former Opposition Leader)	Turnbull defeated Prime Minister Tony Abbott, 54 votes to 44. A second ballot the same evening saw Julie Bishop re-elected as Deputy Leader of the Liberal Party, 70 votes to 30 over Kevin Andrews.
21 August 2018	Liberal	Government	Malcolm Turnbull	Malcolm Turnbull (Prime Minister); Peter Dutton (Minister for Home Affairs)	Turnbull defeated Dutton, 48 votes to 35. Julie Bishop re-elected as Deputy Leader of the Liberal Party unopposed. Dutton resigned as Home Affairs Minister.
24 August 2018	Liberal	Government	Malcolm Turnbull	Julie Bishop (Foreign Minister and deputy party leader); Peter Dutton (Backbencher); Scott Morrison (Treasurer)	Scott Morrison defeated Peter Dutton, 45 votes to 40. Julie Bishop was defeated and eliminated in the first round of voting. The incumbent prime minister, Malcolm Turnbull, did not run for the leadership position once the spill was declared.
4 February 2020	National	Government (coalition with Liberal Party)	Michael McCormack	Michael McCormack (Deputy Prime Minister); Barnaby Joyce (backbencher and former Deputy Prime Minister)	McCormack defeated Barnaby Joyce. David Littleproud elected as Deputy Leader of the National Party.
21 June 2021	National	Government (coalition with Liberal Party)	Michael McCormack	Michael McCormack (Deputy Prime Minister); Barnaby Joyce (backbencher and former Deputy Prime Minister)	Joyce retook the National Party leadership in a snap spill, defeating McCormack. McCormack resigns as deputy prime minister.
13 February 2026	Liberal	Opposition	Sussan Ley	Sussan Ley (Opposition Leader); Angus Taylor (Backbencher who had resigned shortly beforehand as Shadow Minister for Defense)	Taylor succeeded in his challenge to Ley, 34–17.

=== States and territories ===
==== New South Wales ====
Spill date	Party	Status	Incumbent	Contenders	Outcome
5 September 2008	Labor	Government	Morris Iemma	Nathan Rees (Minister for Water and Emergency Services)	In the aftermath of an unsuccessful attempt to privatise the electricity system and party factional leaders blocking his proposed cabinet reshuffle, Iemma resigned after a challenge in the Labor party room from Nathan Rees. Rees and his deputy Carmel Tebbutt were unanimously endorsed by the caucus.
3 December 2009	Labor	Government	Nathan Rees	Nathan Rees (Premier); Kristina Keneally (Minister for Planning)	Keneally defeated Rees 47 votes to 21, becoming New South Wales's first female premier and retaining Carmel Tebbutt as deputy in the first female leadership team in Australia. Rees accused her of being a puppet of factional leaders Eddie Obeid, Joe Tripodi and Frank Sartor.

==== Northern Territory ====
Spill date	Party	Status	Incumbent	Contenders	Outcome
13 March 2013	Country Liberal	Government	Terry Mills	Terry Mills (Chief Minister); Adam Giles (Minister for Transport, Infrastructure and Local Government)	The spill was called while Mills was on a trade mission to Japan, less than a year after he had led the party from opposition to victory in the 2012 election, winning 16 of 25 seats. Giles won the ballot 11–5, becoming the first indigenous head of government of an Australian state or territory. He made Dave Tollner the new Deputy Chief Minister.
2 February 2015	Country Liberal	Government	Adam Giles	Adam Giles (Chief Minister); Willem Westra van Holthe (former Deputy Chief Minister)	The CLP party room voted to oust Adam Giles 9 votes to 5 and replace him with Westra van Holthe, who Giles had replaced as Deputy Chief Minister following the previous leadership spill. However, since a Westra van Holthe-led minority government would lack sufficient parliamentary support without Giles and his supporters, Giles refused to resign. The crisis was settled a day later, when Giles agreed to promote Westra van Holthe to the position of Deputy Chief Minister.
23 April 2015	Labor	Opposition	Delia Lawrie	Michael Gunner (Shadow Minister for Industrial Relations, Employment and Youth)	On 15 April 2015, Lawrie lost the support of her party room following criticism of her conduct during an inquiry into a property deal undertaken while she was a minister. On 19 April 2015, Gunner announced he would stand for the leadership against Lawrie, who was refusing to resign. Four days later, Lawrie resigned and Gunner was elected unopposed as leader, avoiding the need for a five-week ballot process involving rank and file members as well as parliamentarians under the ALP's updated leadership rules.

==== Queensland ====
Spill date	Party	Status	Incumbent	Contenders	Outcome
26 November 1987	National	Government	Joh Bjelke-Petersen	Mike Ahern (Health Minister)	In the aftermath of the Fitzgerald Inquiry, Bjelke-Petersen had lost his authority in the party room. He refused numerous requests for a party meeting, but the party's management committee called one for 26 November. At the meeting, a spill motion carried by a margin of 38–9. Bjelke-Petersen boycotted the meeting and so did not nominate for the ensuing leadership vote, which saw Ahern elected as the new leader and Bill Gunn elected deputy.
6 May 2016	Liberal National	Opposition	Lawrence Springborg	Lawrence Springborg (Opposition Leader); Tim Nicholls (Shadow Minister for Infrastructure, Planning, Small Business, Employment and Trade); Tim Mander (Shadow Minister for Education and Training)	Following months of speculation about his leadership, Springborg called a leadership spill. In the first round, he received 17 votes to 14 for Tim Nicholls and 10 for Tim Mander. In the second round, Nicholls defeated Springborg 22 to 19. John-Paul Langbroek also stood down as Deputy Leader, with Deb Frecklington elected unopposed to replace him.

==== South Australia ====
Spill date	Party	Status	Incumbent	Contenders	
27 November 1996	Liberal	Government	Dean Brown	Dean Brown (Premier); John Olsen	Brown was beaten by John Olsen for the leadership of the South Australian Liberals, despite having taken them to a landslide victory in the 1993 state election.
11 April 2007	Liberal	Opposition	Iain Evans	Iain Evans (Opposition Leader); Martin Hamilton-Smith	Amidst poor polling Martin Hamilton-Smith defeated opposition leader Iain Evans by 13 votes to 10 for the SA Liberal leadership. Evans had become Opposition Leader only on 31 March 2006 in a "dream team" with former rival Vickie Chapman following the Liberals' loss in the 2006 election.
4 July 2009	Liberal	Opposition	Martin Hamilton-Smith	Martin Hamilton-Smith (Opposition Leader); Vickie Chapman (Deputy Leader)	Hamilton-Smith defeated his deputy 11–10, with former leader Iain Evans abstaining from the vote. Isobel Redmond was elected to the deputy leadership to replace Chapman.
8 July 2009	Liberal	Opposition	Martin Hamilton-Smith	Vickie Chapman; Isobel Redmond	Hamilton-Smith called another leadership spill to take place on 8 July 2009, in an attempt to gain a more decisive mandate, but announced he would not run two days before the spill. Chapman ran again for the leadership but was defeated 13-9 by Redmond. Steven Griffiths was elected deputy leader by 8 votes to 6 for Mitch Williams.
21 October 2011	Labor	Government	Mike Rann	Jay Weatherill	Three-term premier Rann was forced by party operatives to step down in favour of Weatherill to maximise the party's chances of victory in the 2014 state election, which angered Rann but was presented to the public as a smooth transition that avoided a confrontation and party room vote.

==== Victoria ====
Spill date	Party	Status	Incumbent	Contenders	Outcome
6 March 2013	Liberal	Government	Ted Baillieu	Denis Napthine (Premier)	First term Liberal premier Baillieu resigned and was replaced by Denis Napthine after the controversial backbencher Geoff Shaw resigned from the Liberal Party, depriving it of a majority in the Victorian Parliament. Baillieu was told by members of his Government that he had lost the support of his party room. Politicians differed in their views on whether the event was a leadership spill or a voluntary resignation.
16 March 2021	Liberal	Opposition	Michael O'Brien	Michael O'Brien (Opposition Leader)	A motion to spill the leadership of the Victorian Liberal Party was brought by backbencher Bruce Atkinson, and shadow minister Brad Battin initially intended to contest for the leadership but backed out due to the lack of support. The spill was defeated 9 votes to 22.
7 September 2021	Liberal	Opposition	Michael O'Brien	Michael O'Brien (Opposition Leader); Matthew Guy (former Opposition Leader)	A motion to spill the leadership of the Victorian Liberal Party for the second time in a year was brought by Tim Smith, an ally of former opposition leader Matthew Guy. Guy and Smith had already resigned from the shadow cabinet the day prior. The spill was successful 20 votes to 11 and the leadership declared vacant. Guy won the subsequent leadership ballot unopposed.
27 December 2024	Liberal	Opposition	John Pesutto	Brad Battin; Chris Crewther; Jess Wilson	A motion to spill the leadership of the Victorian Liberal Party was initiated by a letter calling for a special meeting signed by Brad Battin, Sam Groth, James Newbury, Bridget Vallence and Richard Riordan. Brad Battin was elected leader of the Liberals, Sam Groth was elected unopposed to the deputy leadership after David Southwick stood down, David Davis took over from Georgie Crozier as Legislative Council leader after she did not recontest, and Evan Mulholland was returned as Legislative Council deputy leader after defeating challenger Bev McArthur by two votes.
18 November 2025	Liberal	Opposition	Brad Battin	Jess Wilson	Following a successful leadership spill against Brad Battin, Jess Wilson was elected as leader unopposed. The position of deputy leader was also spilled. Sam Groth was challenged by David Southwick. Groth retained his position, winning by 17 votes to 15.
28 July 2026	Labor	Government	Jacinta Allan	Ben Carroll	After being told she had lost the support of her parliamentary colleagues and initially refusing to resign, Allen resigned after being told by her deputy Carroll that he would be challenging her with the support of several ministers. Gabrielle Williams served for a short period as interim Premier. Carroll was ultimately elected Premier of Victoria on the same day, with Williams becoming Deputy Premier.

==== Western Australia ====
Spill date	Party	Status	Incumbent	Contenders	Outcome
18 September 1981	Labor	Opposition	Ron Davies	Ron Davies (Opposition Leader); Brian Burke	Brian Burke defeated party leader Ron Davies 20 votes to 11 to become the leader of the party and the opposition.
12 February 1990	Labor	Government	Peter Dowding	Carmen Lawrence (Minister for Education and Aboriginal Affairs)	In the midst of the WA Inc scandal, on 7 February 1990 a majority of the parliamentary Labor Party called for the resignation of Dowding, who was overseas at the time. At the subsequent cabinet meeting, Dowding and his deputy David Parker resigned. Dowding was replaced by Lawrence, with Ian Taylor as her deputy. Lawrence became Australia's first female premier and additionally held the portfolios of Treasurer, Minister for Public Sector Management, Women's Interests, Family, Aboriginal Affairs and Multicultural and Ethnic Affairs.
15 March 2016	Labor	Opposition	Mark McGowan	Mark McGowan (Opposition Leader); Stephen Smith (former federal Foreign Minister and Minister for Defence, withdrew challenge)	After Smith expressed doubts that McGowan could win an election and indicated his interest in leading the WA Labor Party, the shadow cabinet and parliamentary caucus unanimously passed a motion supporting McGowan and ordering Smith to withdraw, which led him to abandon his challenge. There was speculation that a number of key backers pulled their support under pressure from state unions.
20 September 2016	Liberal	Government	Colin Barnett	Colin Barnett (Premier)	Following recent resignations from Cabinet by Transport Minister Dean Nalder and Local Government Minister Tony Simpson, a motion to spill the leadership of the WA Liberal Party was brought by backbencher Murray Cowper. It was defeated 31 votes to 15. Nalder, who would have nominated against Barnett if the spill motion had passed, promised not to launch future leadership challenges.

== In popular culture ==
An episode of the American TV series Madam Secretary, "The Common Defense", featured a fictional Australian prime minister and one of the main characters Jay Whitman (Sebastian Arcelus) commented that Australia throws Prime Ministers out like confetti. The episode was originally aired on March 24, 2019, and it is an allusion to the real life frequency of Prime Ministers between 2013 and 2018 as a result of leadership spills against the sitting prime minister, which caused there to be five prime ministers in just five years (Julia Gillard, Kevin Rudd, Tony Abbott, Malcolm Turnbull and Scott Morrison).

== See also ==
- Leadership election
- Leadership review and leadership convention – a very different process of choosing and removing the leader in Canada which involves the broader party membership
