= 1977 Australian Labor Party leadership election =

1977 Australian Labor Party leadership election may refer to:

- May 1977 Australian Labor Party leadership spill
- December 1977 Australian Labor Party leadership election
