= 1968 Australian Labor Party leadership spill =

Political crisis

1968 Australian Labor Party Leadership spill
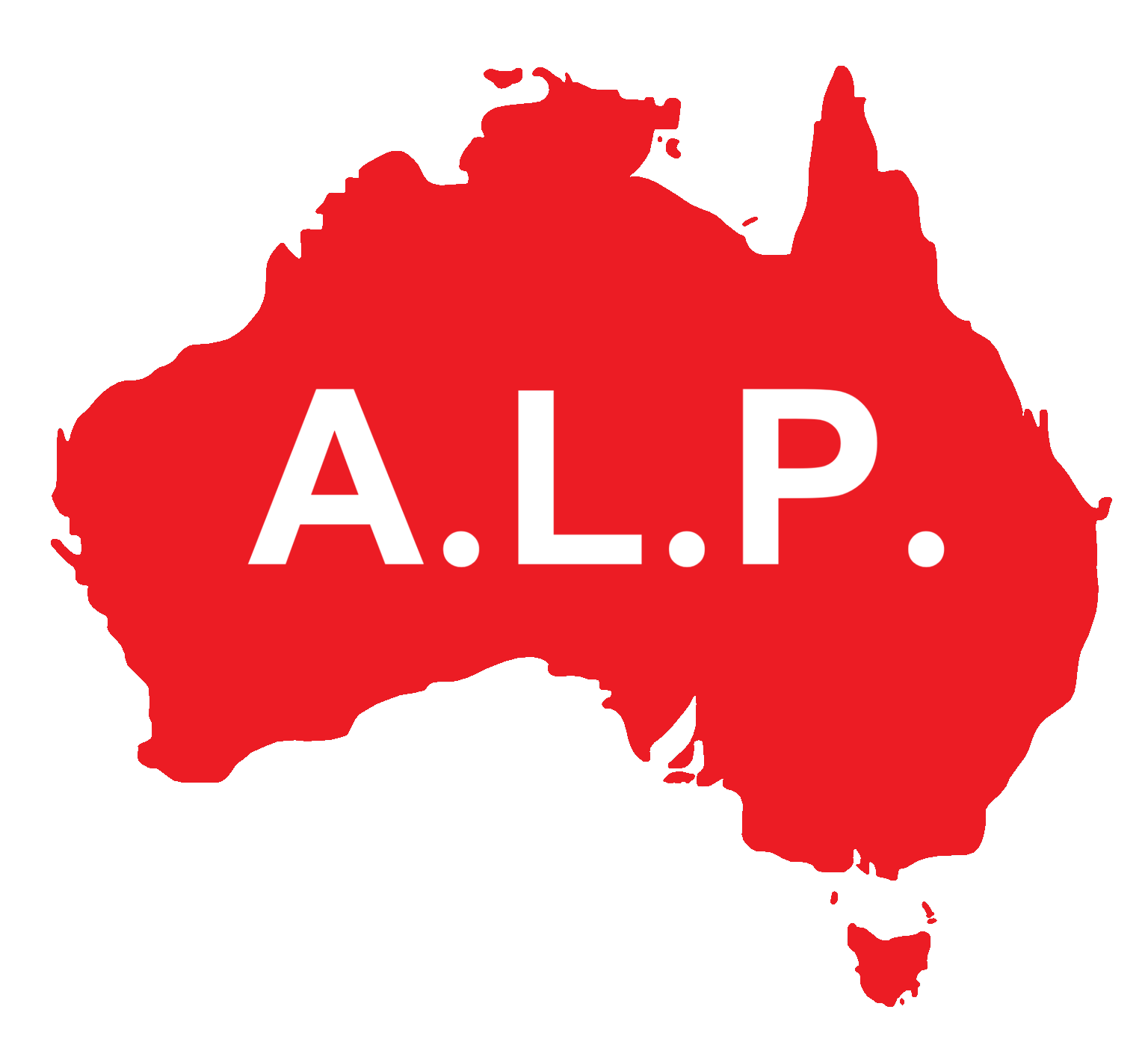
- 30 April 1968
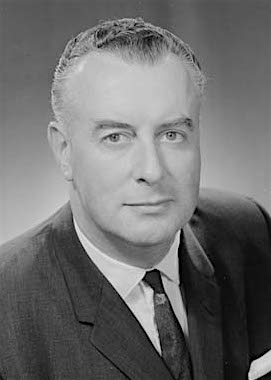

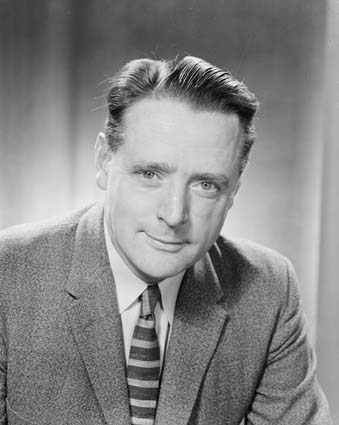
Candidate	Gough Whitlam	Jim Cairns
Caucus vote	38 (54.3%)	32 (45.7%)
Leader before election
Gough Whitlam
Elected Leader
Gough Whitlam

A leadership spill in the Australian Labor Party, the party of opposition in the Parliament of Australia, was held on 30 April 1968. It followed leader Gough Whitlam's decision to resign the leadership following the party executives refusal to seat new Tasmanian delegate Brian Harradine, to which Whitlam demanded a vote of confidence from his caucus. Whitlam received 38 votes to left-winger Jim Cairns' 32 in an unexpectedly close poll.

== Candidates ==
- Jim Cairns, Member of the ALP Caucus Executive, Member for Yarra
- Gough Whitlam, incumbent party leader, Member for Werriwa

== Results ==
The following table gives the ballot results:

Name	Votes	Percentage
Gough Whitlam	38	54.28
Jim Cairns	32	45.72
