= 2025 Victorian Liberal Party leadership spill =

Australian state political party election

- 18 November 2025
- Spill motion

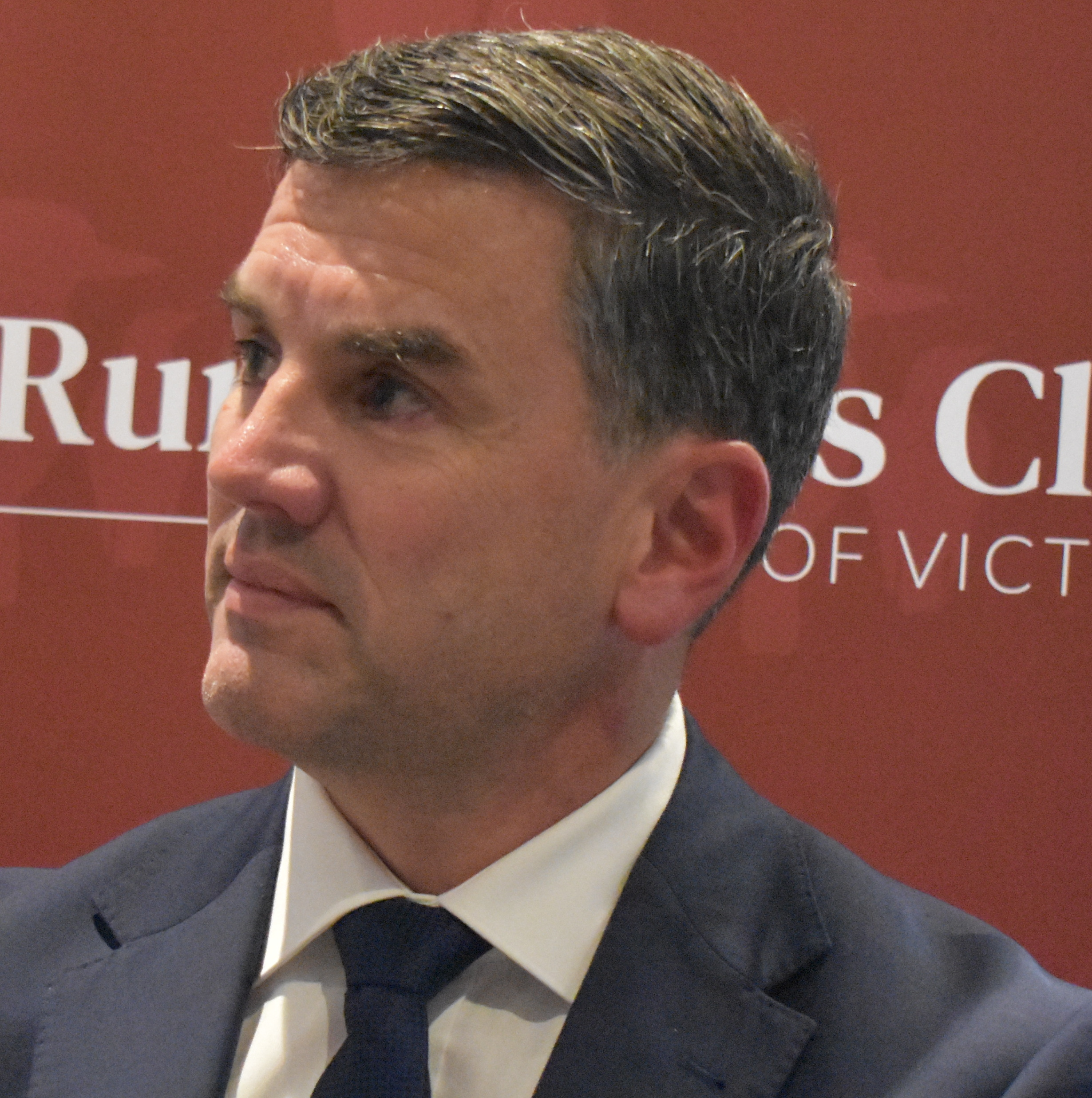
Candidate	Spill motion	Brad Battin
Popular vote	19	13
Seat	–	Berwick
Faction	–	Conservative
- Leadership election
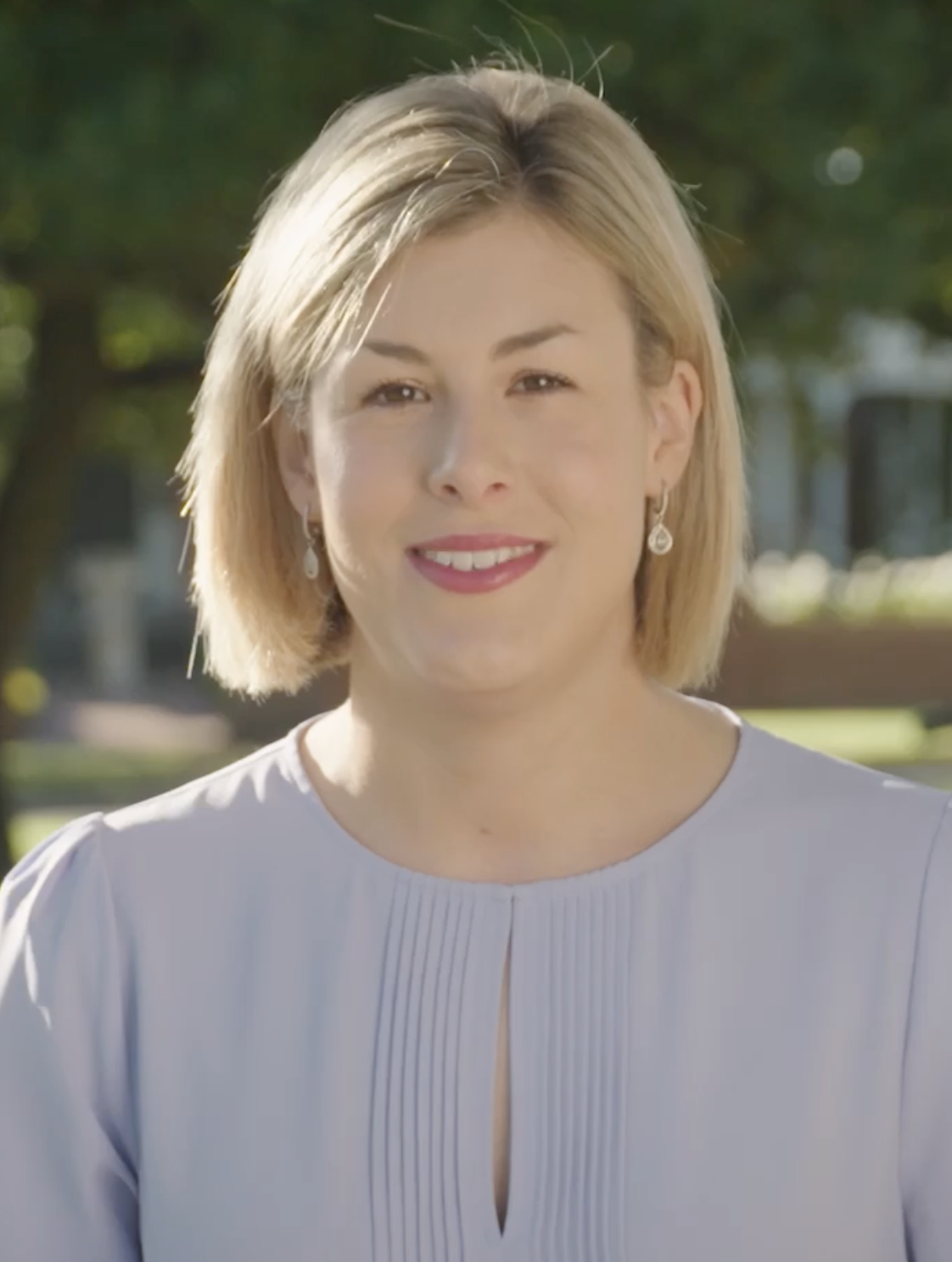
Candidate	Jess Wilson
Caucus vote	Unopposed
Seat	Kew
Faction	Moderate
Leader before election
Brad Battin
Elected Leader
Jess Wilson
- Deputy Leadership election
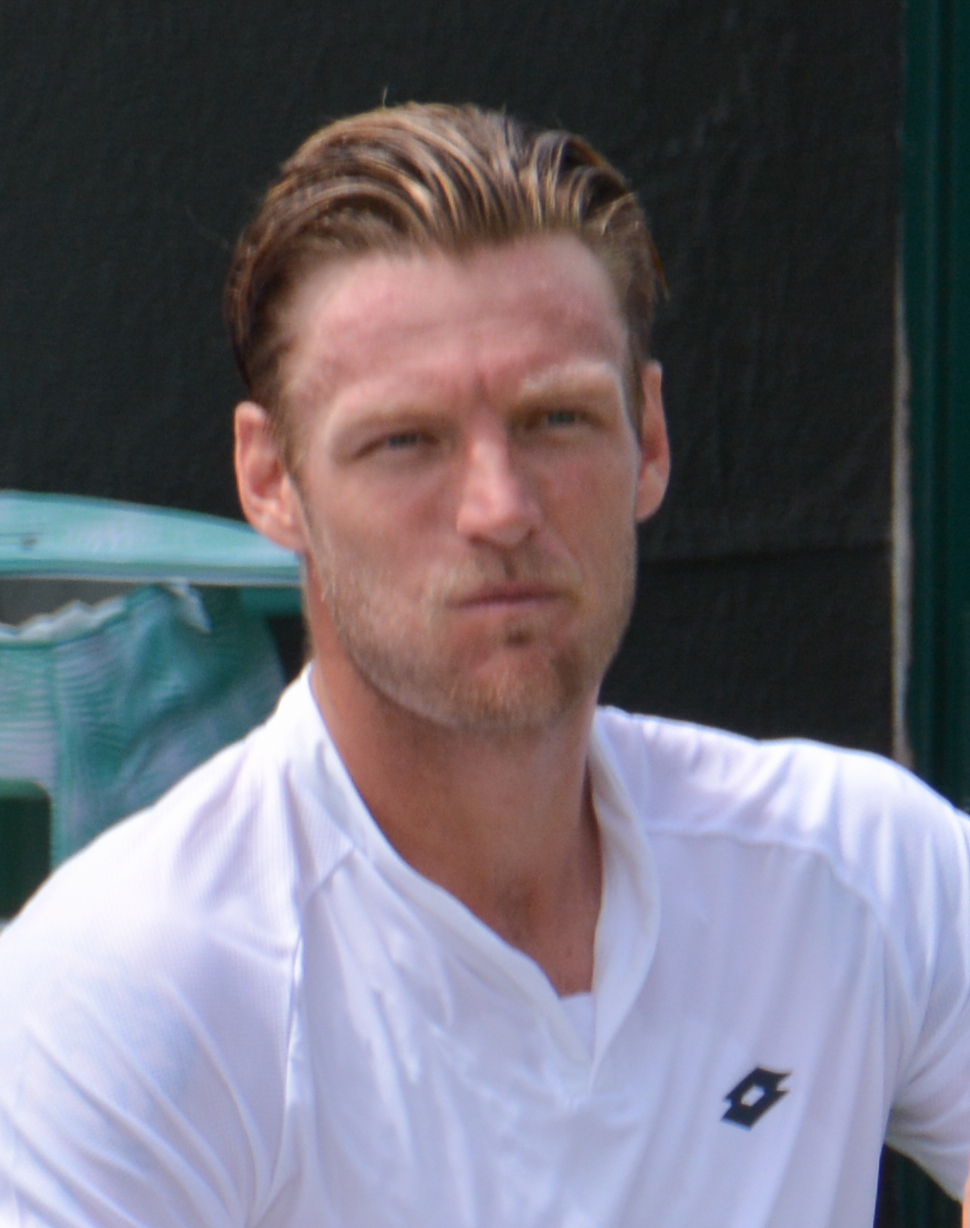

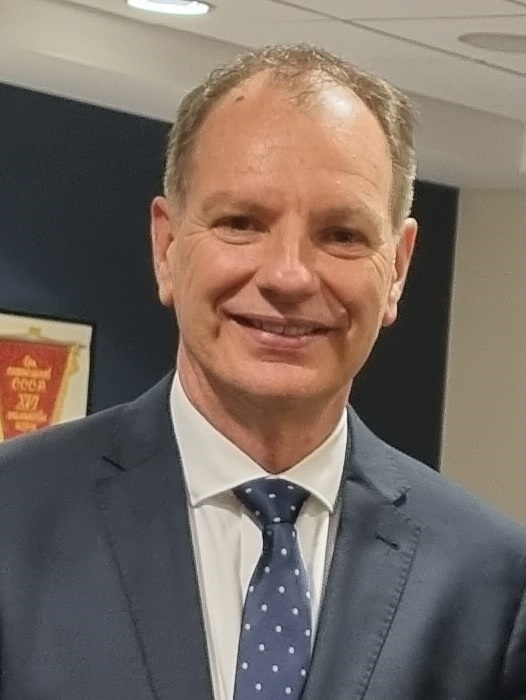
Candidate	Sam Groth	David Southwick
Caucus vote	17	15
Seat	Nepean	Caulfield
Faction	Unaligned (Note: Sam Groth is factionally unaligned, but has also been considered Conservative. Some sources have labelled him a Moderate, however the Geelong Advertiser and The Age reported that the only Moderate elected to a leadership position in 2024 was Evan Mulholland.)	Moderate
Deputy before election
Sam Groth
Elected Deputy
Sam Groth

The 2025 Victorian Liberal Party leadership spill was held on 18 November 2025 to elect the leader of the Victorian Liberal Party and, ex officio, Leader of the Opposition.

Following a successful leadership spill against Brad Battin, Jess Wilson was elected as leader unopposed. The position of deputy leader was also spilled. Sam Groth was challenged by David Southwick. Groth retained his position, winning by 17 votes to 15.

== Background ==
Following the resignation of senior Liberal MPs Michael O'Brien and David Hodgett, on 11 October 2025, a reshuffle of Battin's shadow ministry occurred. The reshuffle saw three first term MPs, Nicole Werner, Nick McGowan, and Richard Welch. It also saw the promotion of former primary challenger Jess Wilson to the Shadow Treasurer portfolio, taking over from Battin ally James Newbury. Battin marketed this as a part of the Victorian coalition's 'fresh start', following a slipping performance in opinion polls. The reshuffle was criticised for promoting factional allies of Battin, rather than deserving individuals within the party.

Renewed leadership tensions ensued from the reshuffle, with both moderate and conservative factions expressing unhappiness with the decisions made by Battin. Speculation arose that Wilson or another Liberal MP would challenge Battin, however Wilson initially refused.

On 17 November 2025, ABC News reported that a cross-factional delegation of Liberal MPs informed Battin that he had lost the support of the party room and that it understood that Wilson would nominate for the leadership of the party in a spill the following morning.

A poll a day before the spill found that the Liberal party was in an election winning position.

== Candidates ==
=== Leadership ===
==== Nominated ====
Candidate	Electorate	Faction	Portfolio(s)
Jess Wilson	Kew	Moderate	Shadow Treasurer (2025–present)

=== Deputy leadership ===
==== Nominated ====
Candidate	Electorate	Faction	Portfolio(s)
Sam Groth	Nepean	Unaligned	Deputy Leader of the Opposition (2024–present); Shadow Minister for Public Transport (2024–present); Shadow Minister for Ports and Freight (2024–present); Shadow Minister for Aviation (2024–present)
David Southwick	Caulfield	Moderate	Shadow Minister for Police and Corrections (2024–present); Shadow Minister for Crime Prevention (2024–present); Deputy Leader of the Opposition (2021–2024)

== Results ==
=== Spill motion ===
2025 Victorian Liberal Party leadership spill: Spill motion
Faction	Candidate	Votes	%	±%
Spill motion		19	59.4	
Conservative	Brad Battin	13	40.6	
Total votes		32	100.0	

=== Leader ===
2025 Victorian Liberal Party leadership spill: Leader
Faction	Candidate	Votes	%	±%
Moderate	Jess Wilson	unopposed		
Total votes		32	100.0	

=== Deputy leader ===
2025 Victorian Liberal Party leadership spill: Deputy leader
Faction	Candidate	Votes	%	±%
Liberal	Sam Groth	17	53.1	
Moderate	David Southwick	15	46.9	
Total votes		32	100.0	

== See also ==
- 2026 Victorian Labor Party leadership election
