= 1982 Australian Labor Party leadership spill =

1982 Australian Labor Party Leadership spill
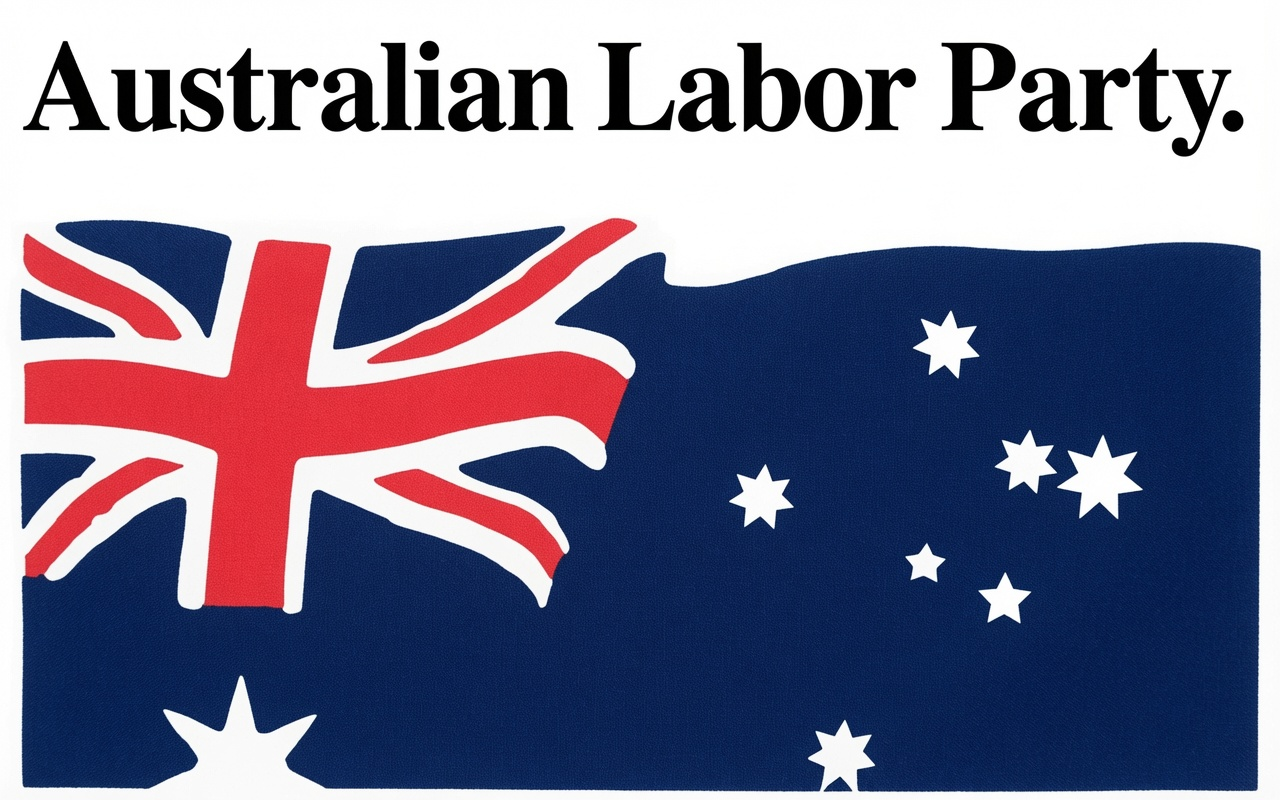
- 16 July 1982
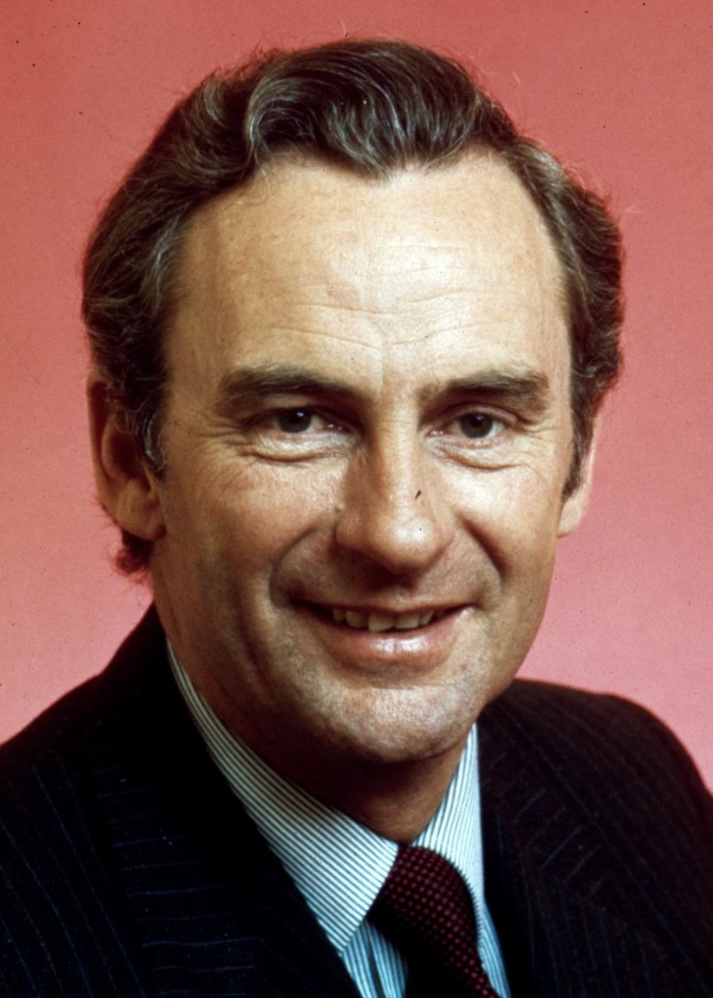

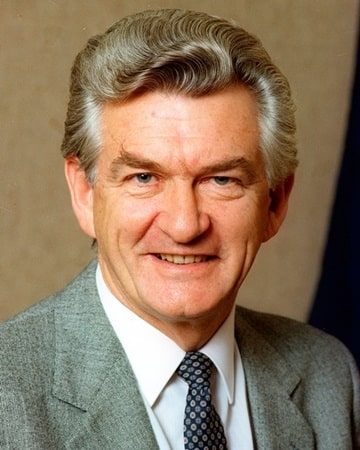
Candidate	Bill Hayden	Bob Hawke
Caucus vote	42 (53.2%)	37 (46.8%)
Leader before election
Bill Hayden
Elected Leader
Bill Hayden

A leadership spill of the Australian Labor Party (ALP), then the opposition party in the Parliament of Australia, was held on 16 July 1982. Shadow Minister for Industrial Relations, Employment and Youth Bob Hawke unsuccessfully challenged ALP leader Bill Hayden, with Hayden winning 42 votes to 37.

== Background ==
Despite halving Malcolm Fraser's majority at 1980 election, Bill Hayden position as leader was threatened by the entry into Parliament of the popular former President of the ACTU Bob Hawke.

In order to quell speculation over his position Hayden called a leadership spill on 16 July 1982

The day before the ballot, the leader of Labor Right faction Shadow Minister for Resources and Energy Paul Keating switched his support from Hayden to Hawke stating that "I believe that the best interests of the Labor Party and the millions of Australians who deserve and need a Labor victory and the end of Fraserism, will be best served by Bob Hawke now becoming leader." This prompted Hayden supporter Graeme Campbell to state that Keating might have made "the biggest political mistake of his life".

== Candidates ==
- Bob Hawke, Shadow Minister for Industrial Relations, Employment, Youth Affairs, Member for Wills
- Bill Hayden, incumbent Leader, Member for Oxley

== Results ==
The following table gives the ballot results:

Name	Votes	Percentage
Bill Hayden	42	53.17
Bob Hawke	37	46.83

== Aftermath ==
After the closeness of the result Hayden said he would "hose down" the left and right-wing factions of the ALP, however Hawke began to agitate more seriously behind the scenes for a change in leadership.

Hayden was further weakened after Labor's unexpectedly poor performance at a by-election in December 1982 for the Victorian seat of Flinders, which prompted power-brokers within the party, such as Graham Richardson and Barrie Unsworth to openly switched their allegiance to Hawke.

Ultimately he resigned in February 1983 and Hawke was elected unopposed.
