= May 1977 Australian Labor Party leadership spill =

May 1977 Australian Labor Party Leadership spill
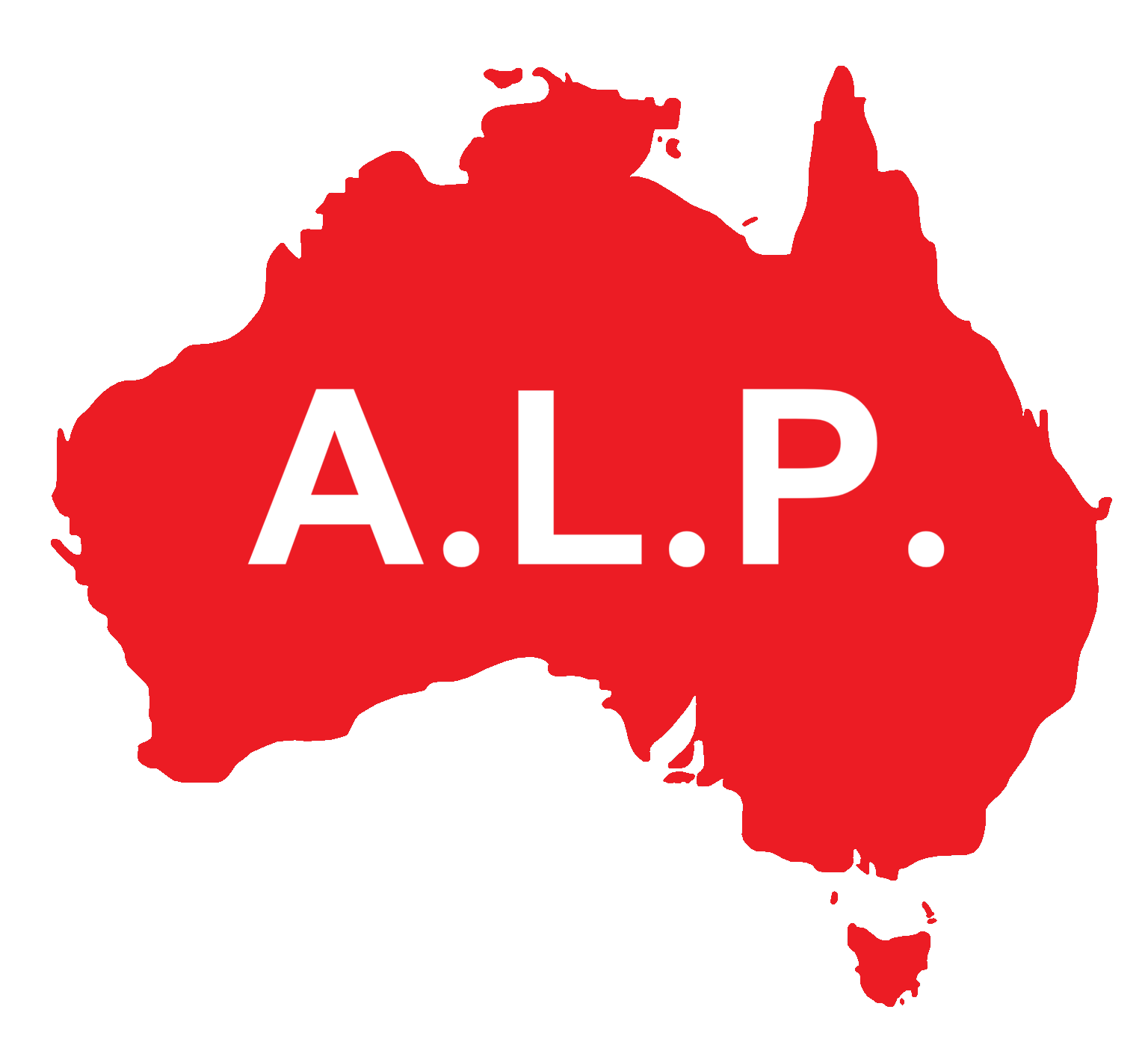
- 31 May 1977
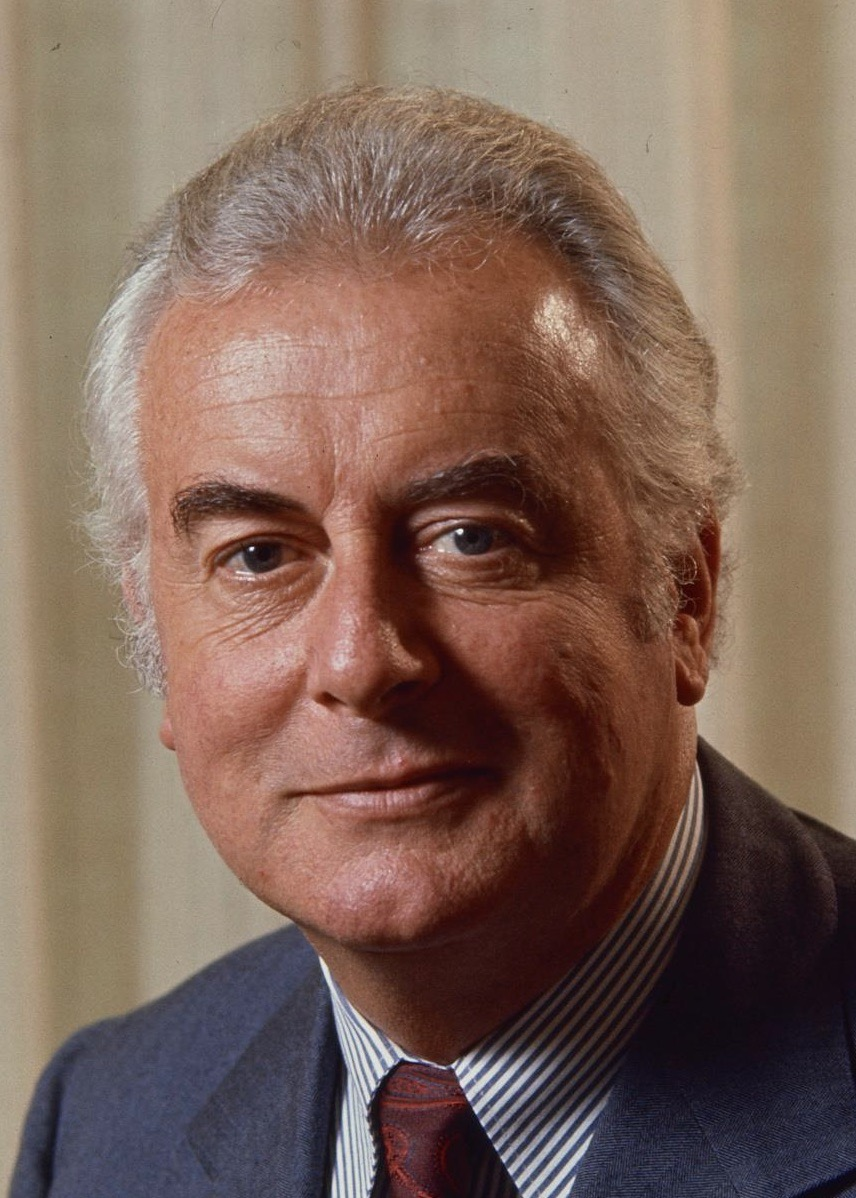

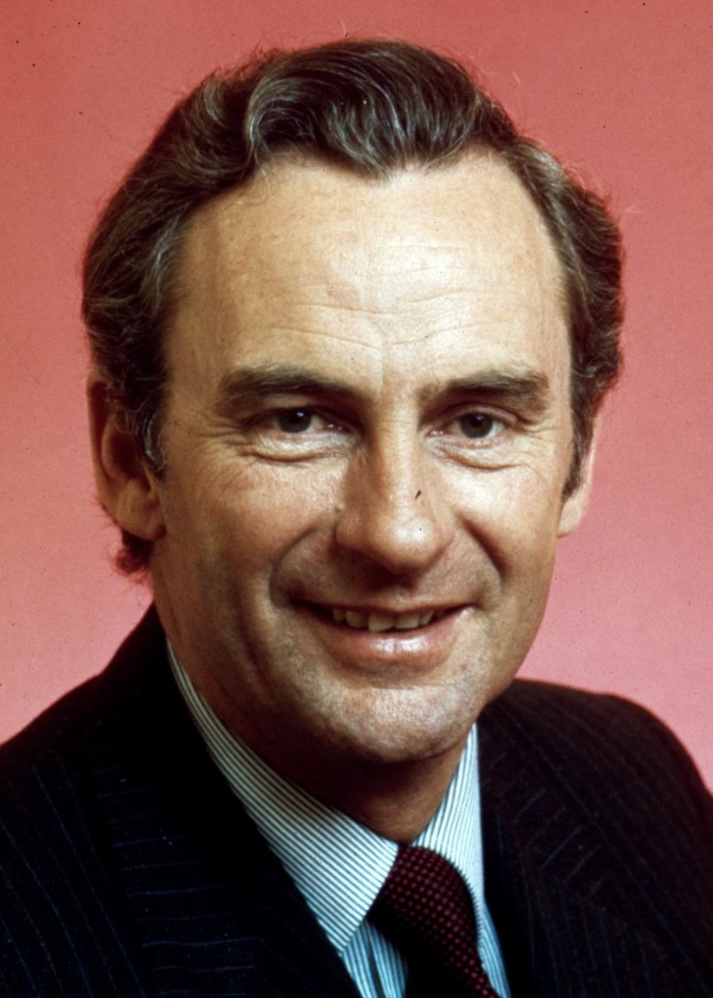
Candidate	Gough Whitlam	Bill Hayden
Caucus vote	32 (51.6%)	30 (48.4%)
Leader before election
Gough Whitlam
Elected Leader
Gough Whitlam

A leadership spill of the Australian Labor Party (ALP), then the opposition party in the Parliament of Australia, was held on 31 May 1977. Former Treasurer Bill Hayden unsuccessfully challenged Labor leader Gough Whitlam. Whitlam was narrowly re-elected by 32 votes to 30 (the smallest possible majority) leading him to later refer to many in his caucus as 'out of touch'.

== Background ==
After his party's heavy defeat at the 1975 election Gough Whitlam was comfortably re-elected leader of the ALP. However over the following year his support began to fall away and many MPs lobbied his former Treasurer Bill Hayden to stand against him. In March 1977 Hayden announced his candidacy.

== Candidates ==
- Bill Hayden, Shadow Minister for Economic Management, Member for Oxley
- Gough Whitlam, incumbent Leader, Member for Werriwa

== Potential candidates who declined to run ==
- Lionel Bowen, Shadow Attorney-General, Member for Kingsford Smith

== Results ==
Australian Labor Party Deputy Leadership spill, May 1977
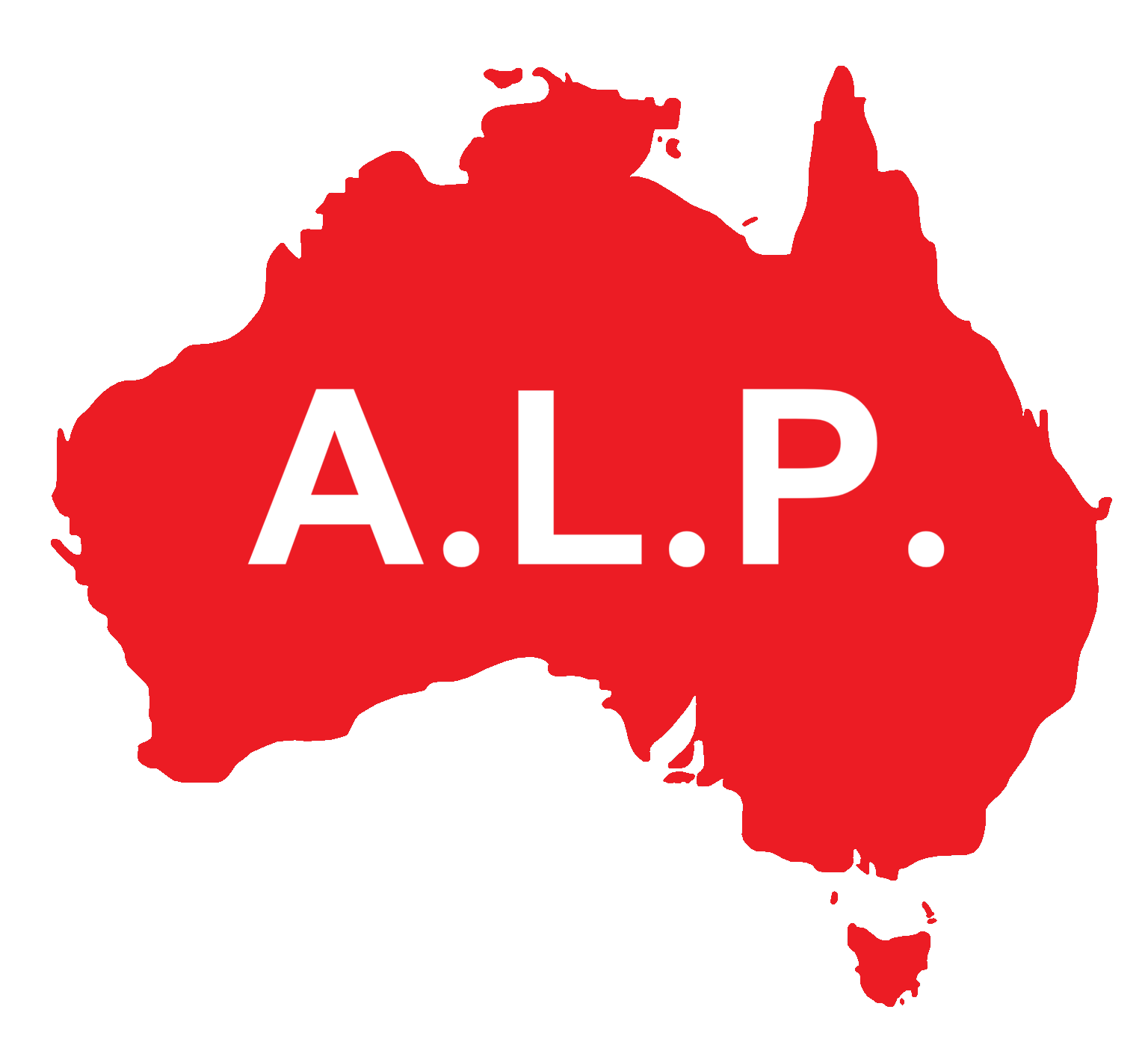

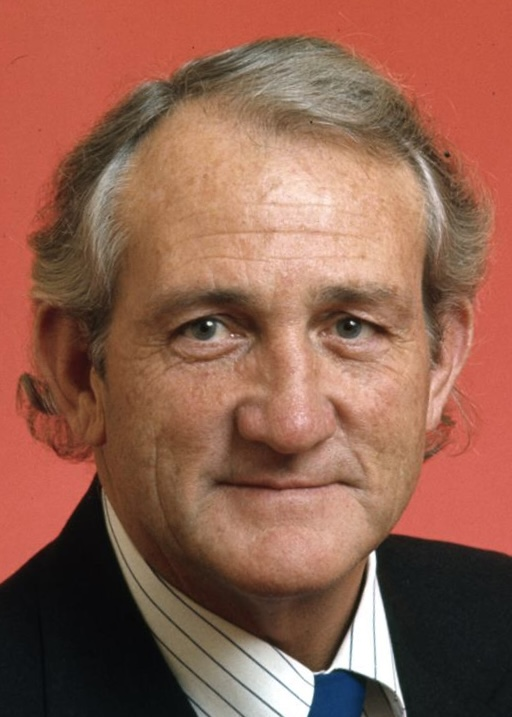

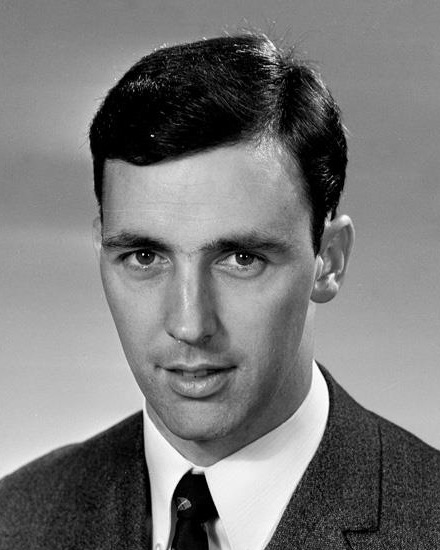

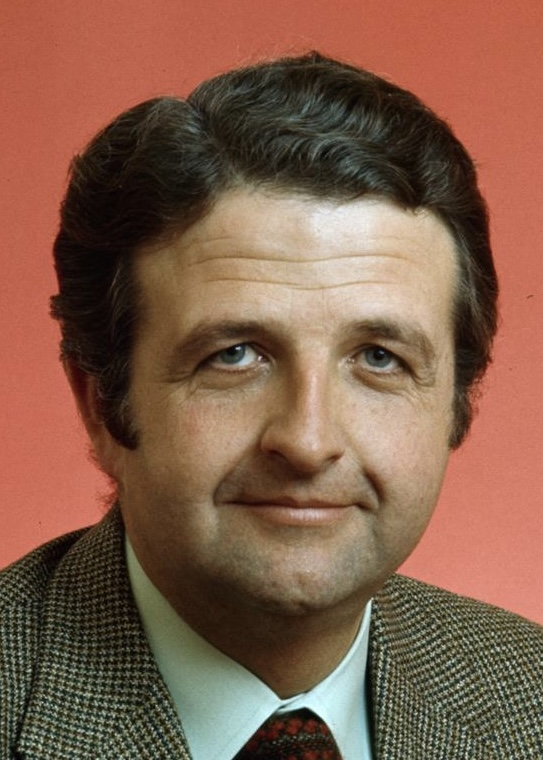
Candidate	Tom Uren	Paul Keating	Chris Hurford
First ballot	28 (45.2%)	22 (35.5%)	12 (19.4%)
Second ballot	34 (54.8%)	28 (45.3%)	Eliminated
Deputy Leader before election
Tom Uren
Deputy Leader after election
Tom Uren

=== Leadership ballot ===
The following tables gives the ballot results:

Name	Votes	Percentage
Gough Whitlam	32	51.62
Bill Hayden	30	48.38

=== Deputy leadership ballot ===
Candidate	1st ballot	2nd ballot
Tom Uren	28	34
Paul Keating	22	28
Chris Hurford	12	Eliminated

== Aftermath ==
Despite surviving the vote the ALP only gained a handful of seats at the 1977 election, which prompted Whitlam to resign as leader with Hayden elected as his replacement.
