= Warren Pickering =

Australian politician (born 1983)

- Pickering in November 2026

Leader of One Nation Victoria
- Incumbent
- Assumed office 3 August 2026
- Deputy: Colleen Harkin
- Preceded by: Robyn Spencer (1998)

Personal details
- Born: 1983 (age 42–43) Gippsland, Victoria
- Party: One Nation
- Children: 1

Military service
- Allegiance: Australia
- Branch/service: Australian Defence Forces Australian Army Reserve

Warren Pickering (born 1983) is an Australian politician and former soldier, serving as leader of One Nation Victoria since August 2026. He is running in the 2026 Victorian state election, contesting the seat of Pakenham. Born in Gippsland, he was also a former One Nation Senate candidate.

== Biography ==
Pickering grew up on a potato farm in Gippsland and has worked as a bricklayer in the Queensland coal industry. In 2011, at age 28, Pickering joined the Australian Defence Forces as a combat engineer.

Pickering is president of the Victorian branch of One Nation, he was a candidate in the 2022 Australian Senate election as well as the following election in 2025. He is the One Nation candidate for the seat of Pakenham in south-east Melbourne.

In September 2026, Pickering's former partner of 18 years claimed that he has a history of heavy drug use, including of using ice, and of "sexual deviance". Pickering, along with federal One Nation leader Pauline Hanson, initially denied the claim before admitting the following day to historic use of methamphetamines and losing his licence three times for drink driving. Pickering's admission led to claims of political hypocrisy, with the party using the same press conference to release details of its crime policies. However, national One Nation leader Pauline Hanson declared her support for Pickering.

== Political views ==
Pickering has promoted conspiracy theories that Australian government policy is controlled by a cabal of foreign "globalists" and that the world economy was deliberately crashed to trigger a "great reset". He has made claims that Australian and Victorian government policies are directed by the United Nations and World Economic Forum and promoted the conspiracy that the 15-minute city urban planning idea is a government plan to limit movement.

Pickering advocates protectionism, and opposes remigration and mass deportations.
