= 1931 Australian Labor Party leadership spill =

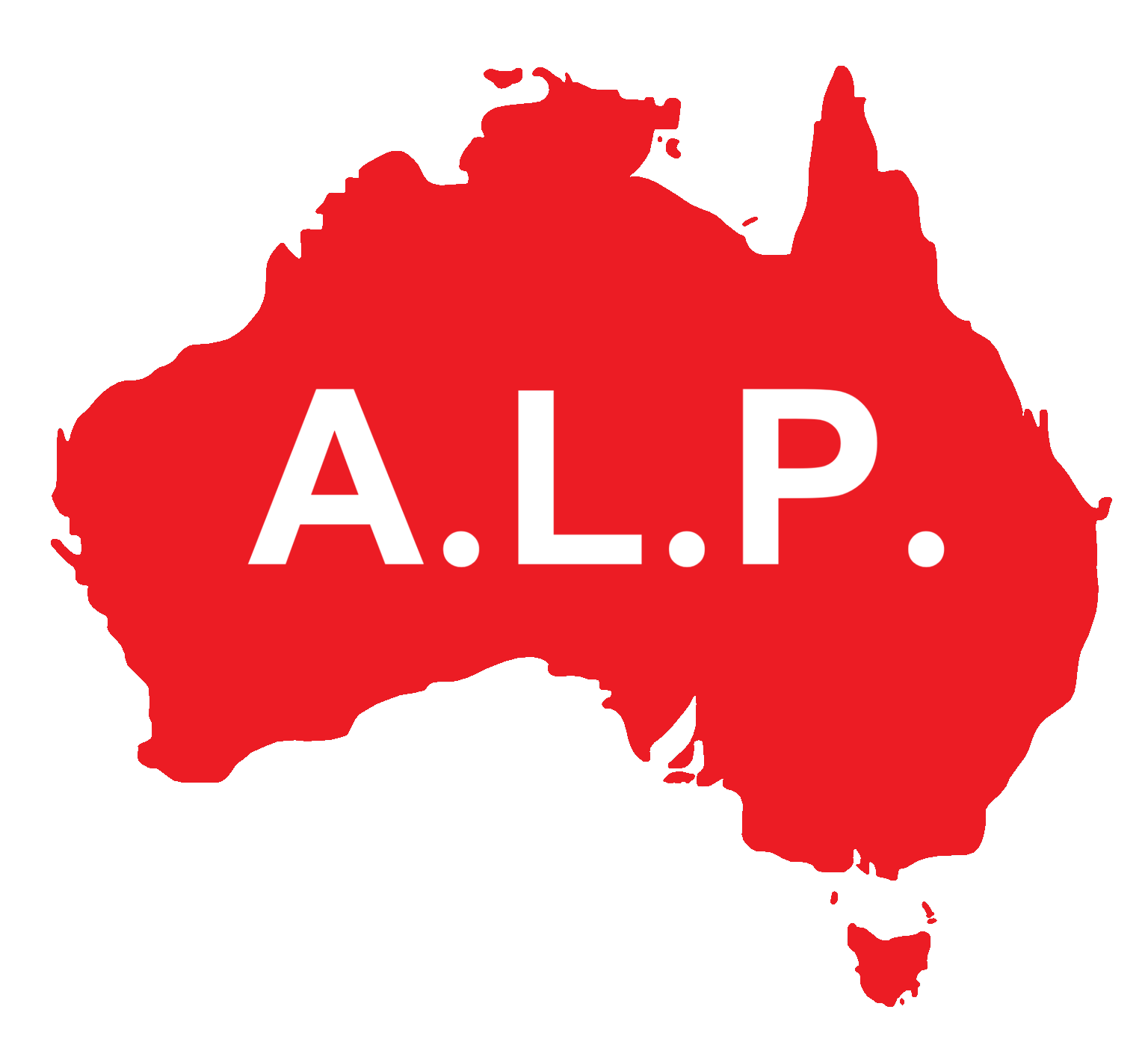
- 2 March 1931
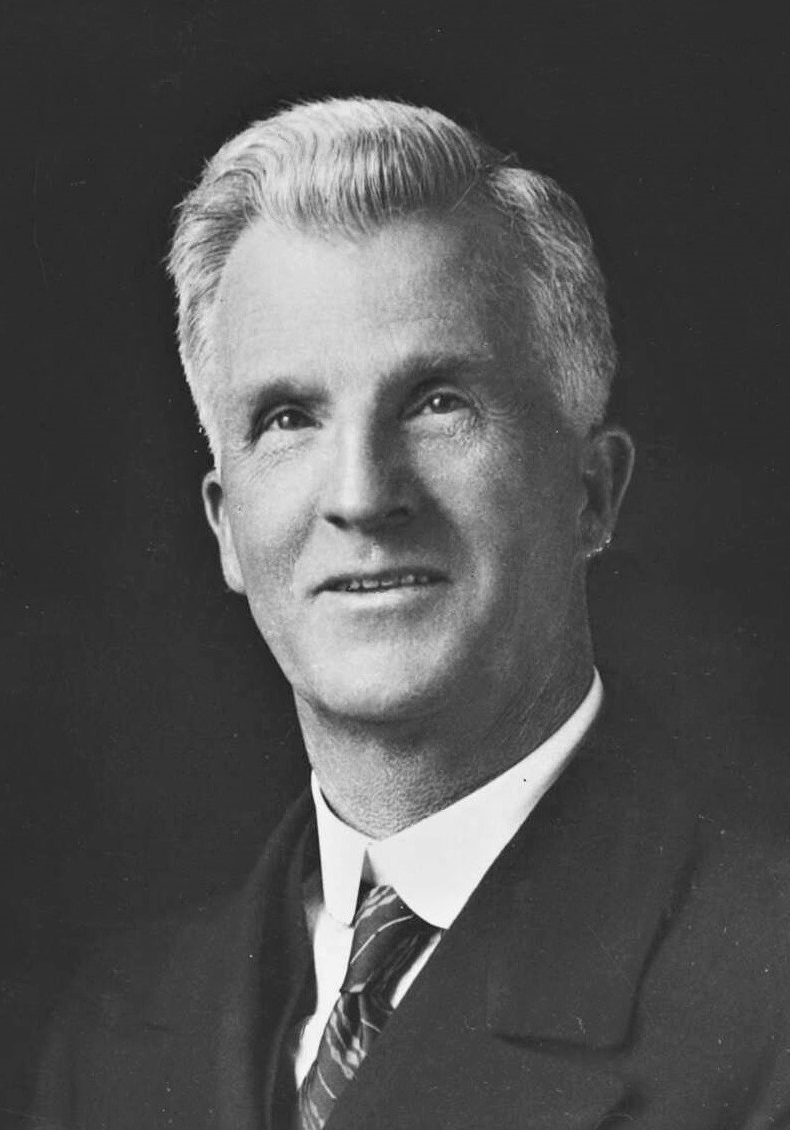

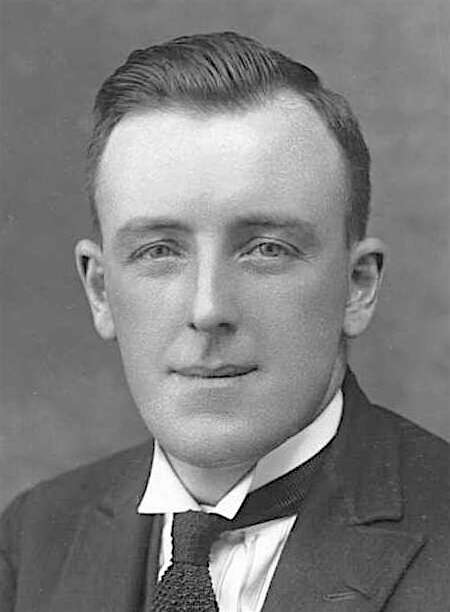
Candidate	James Scullin	Jack Beasley
First Ballot	40 (88.9%)	5 (11.1%)
Leader before election
James Scullin
Elected Leader
James Scullin

The Australian Labor Party held a leadership election on 2 March 1931, in the context of the developing party split. Prime Minister James Scullin was easily re-elected, defeating Jack Beasley of the Lang Labor faction.

== Background ==
Scullin called a meeting of the Labor caucus following the events of 4 February, which saw Joseph Lyons and James Fenton resign from cabinet in protest at the government's economic policy. The nominal purpose of the meeting was to elect replacements for Lyons and Fenton, but Scullin called a leadership ballot in order to shore up his own position. Although the caucus nominally had 52 members, Lyons and five of his supporters did not attend the meeting, and Fenton was present but did not vote. Scullin was re-elected comprehensively, winning 40 out of a possible 45 votes. Jack Beasley, acting as a proxy for Jack Lang and his supporters, received the remaining votes. Ted Theodore was re-elected unopposed as deputy leader, and then a vote was held to elect a new ministry, which saw three ministers (including Beasley) lose their places and five others promoted to the ministry for the first time (including future prime minister Ben Chifley).

== Results ==
The following table gives the ballot results:

Name	Votes	Percentage
James Scullin	40	88.9
Jack Beasley	5	11.1

== See also ==
- Australian Labor Party split of 1931
- Scullin Ministry
