= 2026 Victorian Labor Party leadership election =

Australian political party election

- 28 July 2026
- Leadership election
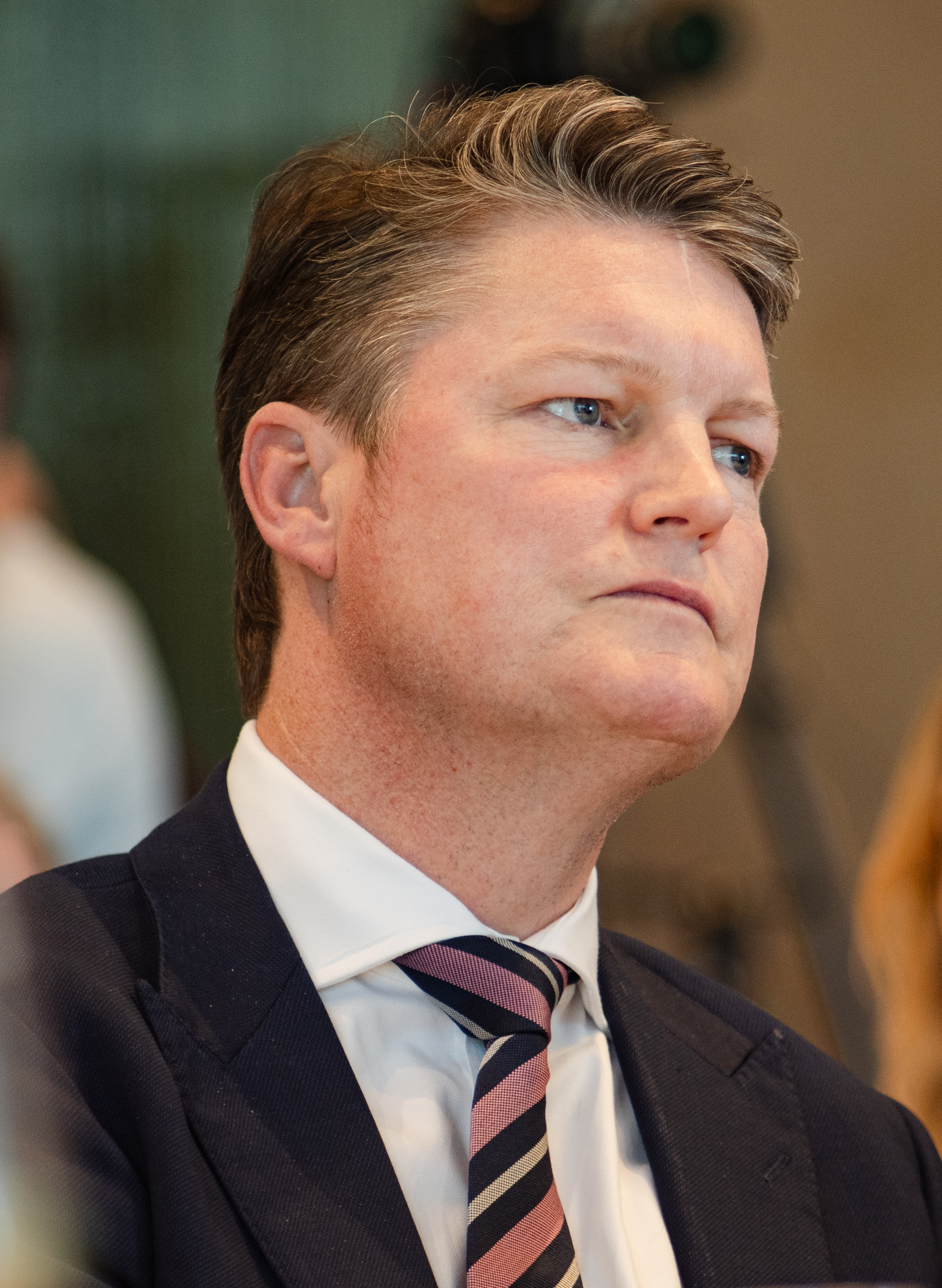
Candidate	Ben Carroll
Caucus vote	Unopposed
Seat	Niddrie
Faction	Right
Leader before election
Gabrielle Williams (interim)
Jacinta Allan
Elected Leader
Ben Carroll
- Deputy leadership election

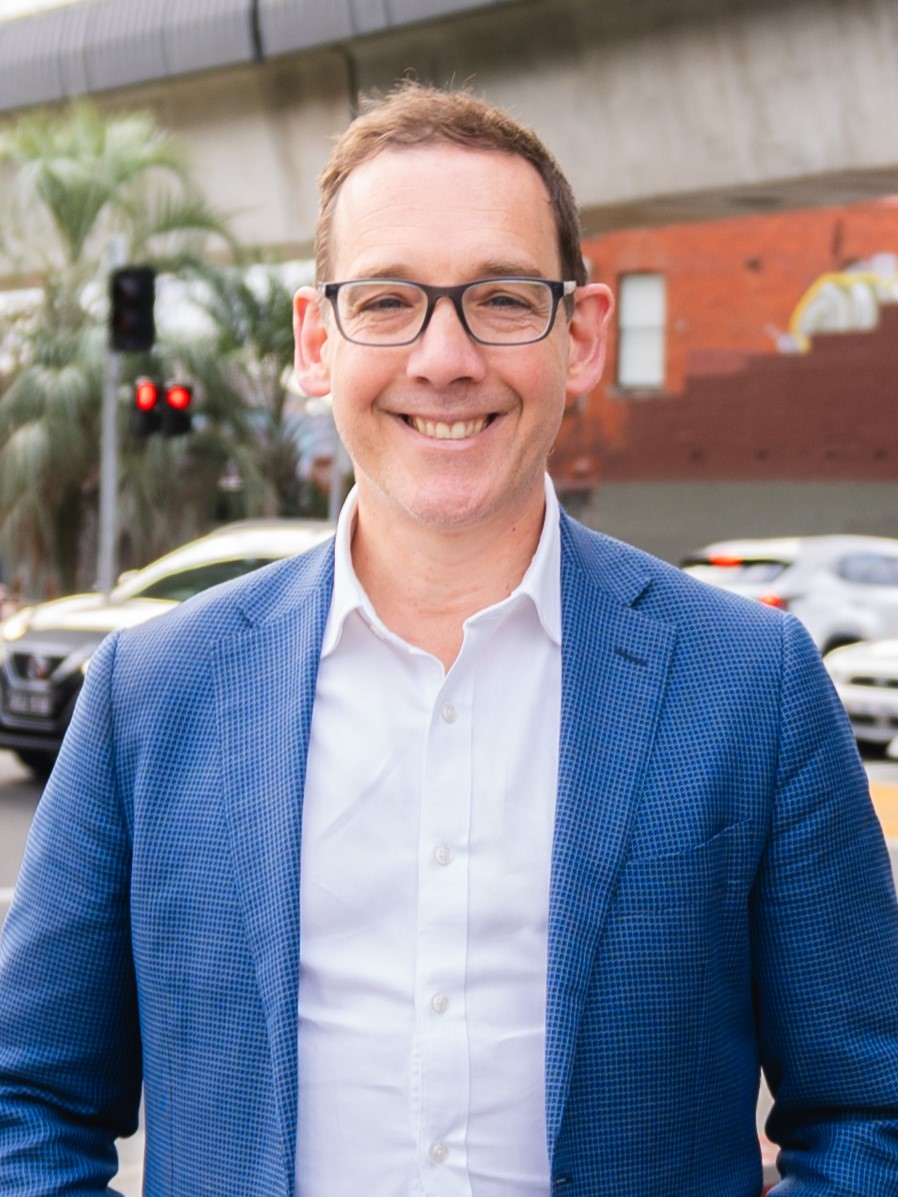
Candidate	Gabrielle Williams	Steve Dimopoulos
Caucus vote	45	23
Percentage	66.2%	33.8%
Seat	Dandenong	Oakleigh
Faction	Left	Left
Deputy Leader before election
Ben Carroll
Elected Deputy Leader
Gabrielle Williams

On 28 July 2026, a leadership election for the Victorian Labor Party was initiated following the resignation of premier Jacinta Allan. Deputy leader Ben Carroll announced on 27 July that he would contest the leadership; he was elected party leader after running unopposed, while Gabrielle Williams was elected deputy leader.

== Background ==
=== 2023 leadership transition ===
On 26 September 2023, Daniel Andrews announced his resignation as premier and leader of the Victorian Labor Party after almost nine years in office. Deputy Premier Jacinta Allan, a member of Labor's Socialist Left faction, nominated to succeed him. Ben Carroll, who was aligned with Labor's Right faction, also sought the leadership but withdrew before a ballot was held following negotiations within the parliamentary party. Allan was elected leader unopposed, while Carroll was elected deputy leader and became deputy premier.

=== Leadership speculation ===
Speculation about Allan's leadership increased during 2026 amid declining opinion polling for Labor and dissatisfaction among some government MPs over the party's prospects at the 2026 Victorian state election. In June, the ABC reported that some Labor MPs had questioned Allan's judgement and expressed concern that the government had not improved its electoral position. Allan said she intended to remain leader and lead Labor to the election.

The government's response to allegations of criminal activity and misconduct involving the construction division of the Construction, Forestry and Maritime Employees Union and contractors on state-funded infrastructure projects also became a source of internal and public criticism. Allan had previously served as minister responsible for transport infrastructure and the government's Big Build program.

Allan rejected calls from the Liberal–National opposition, integrity figures and some Labor MPs for a royal commission, arguing that alleged criminal conduct should be investigated by police and existing integrity agencies. The government instead proposed additional investigative powers for Victoria Police and the Independent Broad-based Anti-corruption Commission.

Carroll publicly ruled out challenging Allan in June. Leadership speculation nevertheless continued, with media reports describing growing concern within both the Left and Right factions about Labor's electoral position and the government's handling of the construction-sector allegations.

=== July 2026 challenge ===
On 26 July, factional conveners from Labor's Left and Right groupings met to assess Allan's support within the parliamentary caucus. The ABC reported that those present concluded that she no longer held the support of a majority of Labor MPs.

On the morning of 27 July, a cross-factional delegation of ministers and other Labor MPs met Allan and urged her to resign. The delegation included ministers Luba Grigorovitch, Enver Erdogan, Lizzie Blandthorn, Anthony Carbines, Gabrielle Williams, Colin Brooks and Ingrid Stitt, as well as MPs Mathew Hilakari and Ella George.

Allan declined to resign and wrote to Victorian Labor state secretary Steve Staikos requesting that the party prepare to conduct a leadership election. She formally stated that she intended to stand as a candidate if an election was required.

Later that morning, Carroll informed Allan that he would contest the leadership. His declaration established a contested leadership election between the premier and deputy premier, three years after Carroll had briefly sought the leadership following Andrews' resignation.

In a speech at 9:30 am on 28 July, Allan announced she would not seek to contest the leadership spill, pledging her support for Carroll if he were elected. Attorney-General Sonya Kilkenny was briefly nominated for the leadership of the party. As a result of Kilkenny's nomination, the party elected Minister for Transport and Infrastructure Gabrielle Williams to serve for a short period as interim leader and interim Premier. Kilkenny withdrew her nomination, allowing Carroll to be elected Premier of Victoria on the same day unopposed, with Williams becoming Deputy Premier.

== Candidates ==
=== Declared ===
- Ben Carroll – Deputy Premier of Victoria (2023–present); Deputy Leader of the Victorian Labor Party (2023–present); MP for Niddrie (2012–present)

=== Withdrew ===
- Sonya Kilkenny – Attorney-General of Victoria (2024–present); Minister for Planning (2022–present); Minister for Finance (2026–present); Minister for Violence Reduction (2026–present); MP for Carrum (2014–present)
- Jacinta Allan – Premier of Victoria (2023–2026); Leader of the Victorian Labor Party (2023-2026); MP for Bendigo East (1999–present) (nominated Kilkenny)

== See also ==
- 2025 Victorian Liberal Party leadership spill
- 2026 Liberal Party of Australia leadership spill
