= Electoral results for the South Eastern Metropolitan Region =

This is a list of electoral results for the South Eastern Metropolitan Region in Victorian state elections from the region's creation in 2006 until the present.

== Election results ==
=== Elections in the 2020s ===
==== 2022 ====
Labor were defending three seats. The Liberal Party and the Liberal Democrats were defending one seat each.

2022 Victorian state election: South-Eastern Metropolitan
| Party | Candidate | Votes | % | ±% |
|---|---|---|---|---|
| Quota | | 78,296 | | |
| Labor | 1. Lee Tarlamis (elected 1) 2. Michael Galea (elected 3); 3. Tien Kieu; 4. Imran Khan; 5. Katrina Sullivan | 184,810 | 39.34 | −9.53 |
| Liberal/National Coalition | 1. Ann-Marie Hermans (elected 2); 2. Manju Hanumantharayappa; 3. Antonietta Moricca; 4. Lyndon Samuel; 5. Michael Keane | 125,762 | 26.77 | −2.80 |
| Greens | 1. Alex Breskin; 2. Louisa Willoughby; 3. Dewani Harahap; 4. Janet Wong; 5. Karen Jones | 31,577 | 6.72 | +1.20 |
| Legalise Cannabis | 1. Rachel Payne (elected 4) 2. Jeffrey Knipe | 24,672 | 5.25 | +5.25 |
| Liberal Democrats | 1. David Limbrick (elected 5) 2. Ethelyn King | 16,971 | 3.61 | +2.46 |
| Democratic Labour | 1. Jennifer Bowden; 2. Khalif White | 15,399 | 3.28 | +1.78 |
| Justice | 1. Derryn Hinch; 2. Mohit Dwivedi | 9,334 | 1.99 | −1.11 |
| Family First | 1. Lee Jones; 2. Colleen Hayward | 9,025 | 1.92 | +1.92 |
| Freedom | 1. Morgan Jonas; 2. Rebekah Spelman | 8,306 | 1.77 | +1.77 |
| One Nation | 1. Beth Stevens; 2. Cyndi Marr | 8,299 | 1.77 | +1.77 |
| Animal Justice | 1. Bronwyn Currie; 2. Davina Hinkley | 6,481 | 1.38 | −0.91 |
| United Australia | 1. Matt Babet; 2. Bobby Singh | 5,495 | 1.17 | +1.17 |
| Sack Dan Andrews | 1. Daniel Costin Puscasu; 2. Rodica Ianculescu | 4,554 | 0.97 | +0.97 |
| Shooters, Fishers, Farmers | 1. Grant Poulton; 2. Will Heily | 4,112 | 0.88 | −0.66 |
| Health Australia | 1. Geraldine Gonsalvez; 2. Kate Lukis | 3,461 | 0.74 | −0.11 |
| Companions and Pets | 1. Marissa Sarif; 2. Wendy Hutchison | 2,425 | 0.52 | +0.52 |
| Reason | 1. Martin Leahy; 2. Ethan Mileikowski | 2,118 | 0.45 | −0.37 |
| Victorian Socialists | 1. Lavanya Thavaraja; 2. Jaynaya Travis | 1,895 | 0.40 | +0.13 |
| Sustainable Australia | 1. Brandon Hoult; 2. Steven Armstrong | 1,512 | 0.32 | −0.36 |
| Transport Matters | 1. Norm Dunn; 2. Toni Peters | 1,380 | 0.29 | +0.94 |
| Angry Victorians | 1. Barry Edward Minster; 2. George Moliviatis | 1,345 | 0.29 | +0.29 |
| New Democrats | 1. Bhaveshkumar Lakhatariya; 2. Satinder Singh; 3. Nilam Dhaval Panchal; 4. Bhavika Amrutlal Patel | 600 | 0.13 | +0.13 |
| Independent | 1. Mehdi Sayed | 242 | 0.05 | +0.05 |
| Total formal votes | | 469,775 | 96.29 | +0.45 |
| Informal votes | | 18,076 | 3.71 | −0.45 |
| Turnout | | 487,851 | 88.45 | −1.32 |

=== Elections in the 2010s ===
==== 2018 ====
Liberal and Labor were defending two seats each. The Greens were defending one.

2018 Victorian state election: South Eastern Metropolitan
| Party | Candidate | Votes | % | ±% |
|---|---|---|---|---|
| Quota | | 72,830 | | |
| Labor | 1. Gavin Jennings (elected 1); 2. Adem Somyurek (elected 2); 3. Tien Kieu (elected 4); 4. Nessie Sayar; 5. Ian Spencer | 218,209 | 49.93 | +9.83 |
| Liberal | 1. Gordon Rich-Phillips (elected 3); 2. Inga Peulich; 3. George Hua; 4. Kuldeep Kaur; 5. Robert Hicks | 126,615 | 28.97 | −6.24 |
| Greens | 1. Nina Springle; 2. Matthew Kirwan; 3. Jacqueline Mitchell; 4. Jake Vos; 5. James Bennett | 24,390 | 5.58 | −0.71 |
| Justice | 1. Peter Davy; 2. Kerri Guy | 13,265 | 3.03 | +3.03 |
| Animal Justice | 1. Elizabeth Johnston; 2. Derrin Craig | 9,727 | 2.23 | +0.37 |
| Democratic Labour | 1. Peter Stevens; 2. Michael Palma | 6,396 | 1.46 | −0.76 |
| Shooters, Fishers, Farmers | 1. Chris Banhidy; 2. Vincent Leone | 6,326 | 1.45 | +0.21 |
| Transport Matters | 1. Ali Khan; 2. Chetan Sharma; 3. Roona Fazal; 4. Inderpal Singh; 5. Deepakbir Kaur | 5,553 | 1.27 | +1.27 |
| Health Australia | 1. Tamsin King; 2. Carly Meaden | 3,722 | 0.85 | +0.85 |
| Reason | 1. Laura Chipp; 2. Brett Kagan | 3,719 | 0.85 | −1.82 |
| Liberal Democrats | 1. David Limbrick (elected 5); 2. Matt Ford | 3,681 | 0.84 | −0.89 |
| Sustainable Australia | 1. Anthony Cresswell; 2. Daryl Budgeon | 3,028 | 0.69 | +0.69 |
| Voluntary Euthanasia | 1. Kassandra Hall; 2. Mardi Hill | 3,019 | 0.69 | +0.12 |
| Aussie Battler | 1. David Armstrong; 2. Michael Chamberlain | 2,822 | 0.65 | +0.65 |
| Liberty Alliance | 1. David Maddison; 2. Ralf Schumann | 2,314 | 0.53 | +0.53 |
| Independent | 1. Tarang Chawla; 2. Nicole Lee | 1,441 | 0.33 | +0.33 |
| Victorian Socialists | 1. Aran Mylvaganam; 2. Ben Reid | 1,239 | 0.28 | +0.28 |
| Country | 1. Andrew Hepner; 2. Marilyn Danieli | 1,202 | 0.28 | +0.28 |
| Hudson for Northern Victoria | 1. Jannette Sinclair; 2. Holly Madill | 402 | 0.09 | +0.09 |
| Independent | 1. Stewart Hine | 62 | 0.01 | +0.01 |
| Independent | 1. Bobby Singh | 49 | 0.01 | +0.01 |
| Independent | 1. Peter Mack | 27 | 0.01 | +0.01 |
| Total formal votes | | 436,977 | 95.86 | −0.25 |
| Informal votes | | 18,962 | 4.16 | +0.25 |
| Turnout | | 455,939 | 89.77 | −3.10 |

==== 2014 ====
2014 Victorian state election: South Eastern Metropolitan
| Party | Candidate | Votes | % | ±% |
|---|---|---|---|---|
| Quota | | 70,159 | | |
| Labor | 1. Gavin Jennings (elected 1); 2. Adem Somyurek (elected 3); 3. Lee Tarlamis; 4. Ian Spencer; 5. Rosalie Davis | 168,803 | 40.10 | −2.92 |
| Liberal | 1. Gordon Rich-Phillips (elected 2); 2. Inga Peulich (elected 4); 3. Ali Khan; 4. Moti Visa; 5. George Hua | 148,236 | 35.21 | −6.16 |
| Greens | 1. Nina Springle (elected 5); 2. Chris Jobe; 3. Wendy Smith; 4. John Flanders; 5. Stefan Zibell | 26,489 | 6.29 | −2.20 |
| Sex Party | 1. Martin Leahy; 2. Alex Chevallier | 11,239 | 2.67 | +2.67 |
| Family First | 1. Lynette Harland; 2. Jeremy Orchard | 11,229 | 2.67 | −0.61 |
| Democratic Labour | 1. Michael Pulma; 2. Lucia De Summa | 9,345 | 2.22 | −0.47 |
| Palmer United | 1. Jason Kennedy; 2. Bobby Singh; 3. Michael Oldfield | 8,330 | 1.98 | +1.98 |
| Animal Justice | 1. Elio Celotto; 2. Tyson Jack | 7,840 | 1.86 | +1.86 |
| Liberal Democrats | 1. Leslie Hughes; 2. Matthew Lesich | 7,300 | 1.73 | +1.73 |
| Christians | 1. Sami Greiss; 2. Manal Dawoud | 5,656 | 1.34 | +1.34 |
| Rise Up Australia | 1. Daniel Nalliah; 2. Rosalie Crestani | 5,324 | 1.26 | +1.26 |
| Shooters and Fishers | 1. Ryan Perry; 2. Allan Bevan | 5,211 | 1.24 | +1.24 |
| Voluntary Euthanasia | 1. Sorin Ionascu; 2. Greg Mauldon | 2,408 | 0.57 | +0.57 |
| People Power Victoria | 1. Basil Waters; 2. Maria Sirianni | 1,824 | 0.43 | +0.43 |
| Cyclists | 1. Robert Siddle; 2. Troy Parsons | 1,636 | 0.39 | +0.39 |
| Independent | Arif Okil | 81 | 0.02 | +0.02 |
| Total formal votes | | 420,951 | 96.09 | |
| Informal votes | | 17,121 | 3.91 | |
| Turnout | | 438,072 | 92.87 | |

==== 2010 ====
2010 Victorian state election: South Eastern Metropolitan
| Party | Candidate | Votes | % | ±% |
|---|---|---|---|---|
| Quota | | 66,157 | | |
| Labor | 1. Gavin Jennings (elected 1); 2. Adem Somyurek (elected 3); 3. Lee Tarlamis (elected 5); 4. Kelly Liu; 5. Janet Kaylock | 172,306 | 43.4 | −6.4 |
| Liberal | 1. Gordon Rich-Phillips (elected 2); 2. Inga Peulich (elected 4); 3. Gladys Liu; 4. Ashton Ashokkumar; 5. Tim Cincotta | 162,517 | 40.9 | +7.2 |
| Greens | 1. Colin Long; 2. Dee-Ann Kelly; 3. Chris Carman; 4. Linda McIver; 5. Daniela Tymms | 34,754 | 8.8 | +1.6 |
| Family First | 1. Felicity Hemmersbach; 2. Jadah Pleiter | 12,560 | 3.2 | −2.1 |
| Democratic Labor | 1. Geraldine Gonsalvez; 2. Catherine Dodd; 3. Agnieszka Chlipala; 4. Genevieve Cattell; 5. Helen O'Loghlen | 10,202 | 2.6 | +1.7 |
| Christian Democrats | 1. Vivian Hill; 2. Wolf Voigt | 4,510 | 1.1 | +0.4 |
| Total formal votes | | 396,939 | 96.4 | +1.6 |
| Informal votes | | 14,758 | 3.6 | −1.6 |
| Turnout | | 411,697 | 92.7 | −0.7 |

=== Elections in the 2000s ===
==== 2006 ====
2006 Victorian state election: South Eastern Metropolitan
| Party | Candidate | Votes | % | ±% |
|---|---|---|---|---|
| Quota | | 60,925 | | |
| Labor | 1. Gavin Jennings (elected 1); 2. Adem Somyurek (elected 3); 3. Bob Smith (elected 5); 4. Vince Rossi; 5. Shilana Yip | 181,986 | 49.8 | −4.4 |
| Liberal | 1. Gordon Rich-Phillips (elected 2); 2. Inga Peulich (elected 4); 3. Ken Ong; 4. Susanne La Fontaine; 5. John Aivaliotis | 123,067 | 33.7 | −0.9 |
| Greens | 1. Jim Reiher; 2. Nicole Avery; 3. Dean Andrew | 26,408 | 7.2 | −1.8 |
| Family First | 1. Ann-Marie Hermans; 2. Steven Ashdown; 3. Ann Ross; 4. Annette Blazé | 19,238 | 5.3 | +5.3 |
| Democrats | 1. Karen Bailey; 2. David Batten; 3. Daniel Berk | 4,967 | 1.4 | −0.8 |
| Democratic Labor | 1. Denise de Graaff; 2. Frances Murphy | 3,276 | 0.9 | +0.9 |
| People Power | 1. Linda Hancock; 2. Maria Pazaitis | 2,580 | 0.7 | +0.7 |
| Christian Democrats | 1. Sandra Herrmann; 2. Jenny Zuiderwyk | 2,468 | 0.7 | +0.7 |
| Group E | 1. Geraldine Gonsalvez; 2. Julie Boustead | 1,557 | 0.4 | +0.4 |
| Total formal votes | | 365,547 | 94.8 | −1.3 |
| Informal votes | | 20,200 | 5.2 | +1.3 |
| Turnout | | 385,747 | 93.4 | |
