= 2026 Victorian Legislative Council election =

Election for the 61st Parliament of Victoria

2026 Victorian state election
- 28 November 2026

All 40 seats in the Legislative Council 21 seats needed for a majority
- Opinion polls
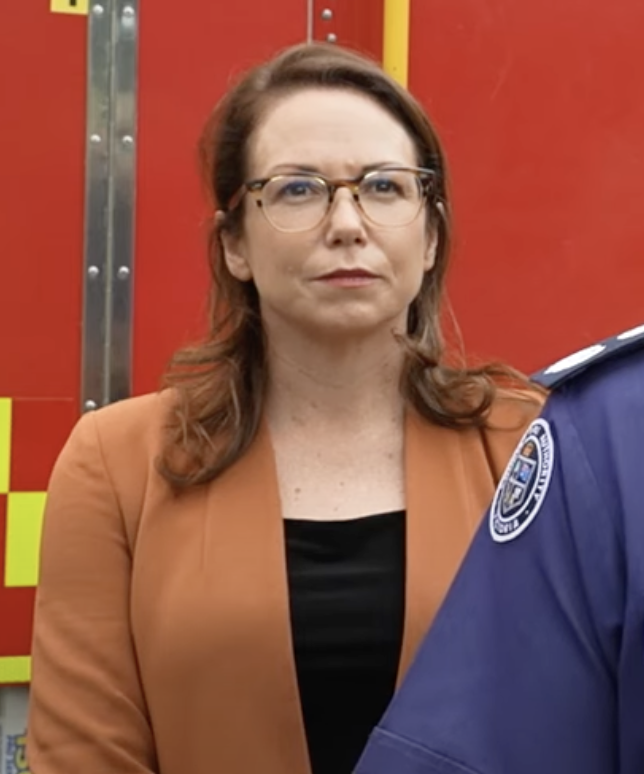

Leader	Jaclyn Symes	Bev McArthur	Sarah Mansfield
Party	Labor	Liberal/National Coalition	Greens
Leader since	23 March 2020	18 November 2025	23 April 2024
Leader's seat	Northern Victoria	Western Victoria	Western Victoria
Last election	15 seats; 33.01%	14 seats; 29.44%	4 seats; 10.32%
Current seats	15	13 (Note: Moira Deeming (Western Metropolitan) quit the party on 28 July 2026 after having her endorsement for re-election revoked.)	4
	LCV
Leader	No leader	Warren Pickering	David Limbrick
Party	Legalise Cannabis	One Nation	Libertarian
Leader since	—	3 August 2026	December 2022
Leader's seat	—	Contesting Pakenham	South-Eastern Metropolitan
Last election	2 seats; 4.09%	1 seat; 2.04%	1 seat; 2.64%
Current seats	2	1	1
	SFF
Leader	Jeff Bourman	Georgie Purcell	Cary de Wit
Party	Shooters, Fishers and Farmers	Animal Justice	Labour DLP
Leader since	2018	13 December 2022	unknown
Leader's seat	Eastern Victoria	Eastern Victoria	Contesting NE Metropolitan
Last election	1 seat; 2.05%	1 seat; 1.51%	1 seat; 4.09%
Current seats	1	1	0 (Note: Adem Somyurek (Northern Metropolitan) quit the party on 25 March 2024.)
- Largest party by region

The 2026 Victorian Legislative Council election will be held on Saturday, 28 November 2026 to elect all 40 of the members of the Victorian Legislative Council as part of the 2026 state election. It will be the first election since the abolition of group voting tickets which were introduced in 2006.

== Statewide results ==
Legislative Council (STV) – (CV)
Party	Votes	%	Swing	Seats	Change
Labor					
Liberal–National Coalition					
Liberal					
Liberal/National joint ticket					
National					
Greens					
Legalise Cannabis					
One Nation					
Libertarian					
Shooters, Fishers and Farmers					
Family First					
Animal Justice					
Labour DLP					
Victorian Socialists					
West Party					
Socialist Alliance					
Sustainable Australia					
Citizens					
Christian Alliance – Reform AU					
The Republican					
Socialist Equality (unregistered)					
Independents and ungrouped					
Total valid votes				–	–
Invalid/blank votes				–	–
Total				40	Steady
Registered voters	4,726,925				

==== Seats table ====
Region	Seats won
Eastern Victoria	
North-Eastern Metropolitan	
Northern Metropolitan	
Northern Victoria	
South-Eastern Metropolitan	
Southern Metropolitan	
Western Metropolitan	
Western Victoria	

Party key:

Labor
Liberal
Greens
National
Legalise Cannabis
One Nation
Libertarian
Shooters, Fishers and Farmers
Animal Justice
Labour DLP

== Results by region ==
=== Eastern Victoria ===
2026 Victorian state election: Eastern Victoria
Party	Candidate	Votes	%	±%
Quota				
Liberal/National Coalition	1. Renee Heath (Lib); 2. Melina Bath (Nat); 3. Matt Green (Lib); 4. Barry Besanko (Lib); 5. Richard Clark (Nat)			
Labor	1. Enver Erdogan; 2. Leticia Quintana; 3. Denise Ryan; 4. Ian Rogers; 5. Ryan Mather			
Greens	1. Mat Morgan; 2. Xero Turnbull; 3. Oliver Jobe; 4. Helen Chauhan; 5. Phillip Watt			
One Nation	1. Clay Esler; 2. Neil Davison; 3. John De Wacht			
Legalise Cannabis	1. Danielle Burridge; 2. Devon Starbuck			
Labour DLP	1. Khalif White; 2. Daniel Hamman			
Shooters, Fishers, Farmers	1. Jeff Bourman; 2. Kerrie-Anne Muir			
Animal Justice	1. Helen Jeges; 2. Philip Waters			
Victorian Socialists	1. Max Forward; 2. Dylan Edwards			
Sustainable Australia	1. Reade Smith; 2. Inge Meldgaard			
Independent (Group J)	1. Ant Pitt O'Brien; 2. Kate Coxall			
Total formal votes				
Informal votes				
Turnout				

=== Northern Victoria ===
2026 Victorian state election: Northern Victoria
Party	Candidate	Votes	%	±%
Quota				
Liberal/National Coalition	1. Steve Brooks (Lib); 2. Gaelle Broad (Nat); 3. Amanda Millar (Lib); 4. Chad Muller (Nat); 5. Brad Hearn (Lib)			
Labor	1. Jaclyn Symes; 2. Jana Sarantis; 3. Mitch Bridges; 4. Natasha Gayfer; 5. Greg Olsen			
Greens	1. Cate Sinclair; 2. Lucas Maddock; 3. Wil Mikelsons; 4. Helen Robinson; 5. Samantha Bright			
One Nation	1. Rikkie-Lee Tyrrell; 2. Athol Thomas; 3. Luke Sorenson			
Legalise Cannabis	1. Wayne Taylor; 2. Scott Williams			
Animal Justice	1. Georgie Purcell; 2. Laurie Levy			
Shooters, Fishers, Farmers	1. Ethan Constantinou; 2. Geoff Ashby			
Labour DLP	1. Chai Van Dorssen; 2. Sophie De Wit			
Victorian Socialists	1. Dorothy Lamond; 2. Rohan Tyler			
Sustainable Australia	1. Paul Read; 2. Cheryl Blacker			
Citizens	1. Chris Lahy; 2. Jeff Davy			
Family First	1. Reade Smith; 2. Inge Meldgaard			
Independent (Group B)	1. Kate White; 2. Alex Green			
Independent	Nick McHugh			
Total formal votes				
Informal votes				
Turnout				

=== Western Victoria ===
2026 Victorian state election: Western Victoria
Party	Candidate	Votes	%	±%
Quota				
Liberal/National Coalition	1. Bev McArthur (Lib); 2. Graham Watt (Lib); 3. Robert Letts (Nat); 4. Ellie Read (Lib); 5. Melody Steed (Nat)			
Labor	1. Kate Maxfield; 2. Jacinta Ermacora; 3. Sam Anwari; 4. Kaitlyn Handreck; 5. Fiona Mackenzie			
Greens	1. Sarah Mansfield; 2. Belinda Coats; 3. Steve Veale; 4. Aleisha Smith; 5. Heaven Van Asperen			
Family First	1. Dianne Colbert; 2. Anne Moloney; 3. Senthil Veerappagounder; 4. Brendan William Thomas			
One Nation	1. Chris Burson; 2. Vaughan Williams; 3. Jason Oosthuizen			
Socialist Alliance	1. Tim Gooden; 2. Sue Bull; 3. Ross Smith			
Legalise Cannabis	1. Peter Mitchell; 2. Alice Davy			
Libertarian	1. Paul Barker; 2. Phill Schiemer			
Shooters, Fishers, Farmers	1. Ben Collyer; 2. Ken Vickers			
Labour DLP	1. Costa Di Biase; 2. Jennifer Bowden			
Victorian Socialists	1. Ben Nunquam; 2. Dominique Houzet			
Democrats	1. Andy Meddick; 2. Peter Kelly			
Sustainable Australia	1. Madeleine Wearne; 2. Ian Chivers			
The Republican	1. Sindhu Sama; 2. Akwinder Kaur			
Independent (Group H)	1. Aleta Moriarty; 2. Timothy Denton			
Independent	Eve Fisher			
Total formal votes				
Informal votes				
Turnout				

=== Northern Metropolitan ===
2026 Victorian state election: Northern Metropolitan
Party	Candidate	Votes	%	±%
Quota				
Liberal	1. Evan Mulholland; 2. Bernadette Khoury; 3. Shankar Dharel; 4. Usman Ghani; 5. Mark Briers			
Labor	1. Sheena Watt; 2. Tom McIntosh; 3. Sainab Sheikh; 4. Praveen Komaragiri; 5. Dan Cairnes			
Greens	1. Anasina Gray-Barberio; 2. Sam Drummond; 3. Tara Burnett; 4. Hannah Thomas; 5. Tim Sheehan			
Victorian Socialists	1. Omar Hassan; 2. Louisa Bassini; 3. Catherine Robertson; 4. Belle Gibson; 5. Bella Beiraghi			
One Nation	1. Mark Nicholson; 2. Anna Galluzzo			
Socialist Alliance	1. Meredith Lawrence; 2. Chloe Beaton; 3. Darren Saffin			
Labour DLP	1. John Kavanagh; 2. James Fung			
Legalise Cannabis	1. Riley Aickin; 2. King River Wind			
Family First	1. Imad Hirmiz; 2. Andrew Deeming			
Sustainable Australia	1. Bert Jessup; 2. Beth Couch; 3. Daryl Bludgeon			
Democrats	1. Andrew Rowse; 2. Sahar Khalili			
Unlabelled SEP (Group B)	1. Morgan Peach; 2. Peter Byrne			
Independent (Group J)	1. Bassima Hawli; 2. Anastasia Drapaniotis; 3. Abir Dandach; 4. Selin Gungormus			
Independent	Peter Razos			
Total formal votes				
Informal votes				
Turnout				

=== North-Eastern Metropolitan ===
2026 Victorian state election: North-Eastern Metropolitan
Party	Candidate	Votes	%	±%
Quota				
Liberal	1. Richard Welch; 2. Deirdre Diamante; 3. John Pyrros; 4. Sue Leidler; 5. David Solly			
Labor	1. Ryan Batchelor; 2. James Gan; 3. Rana Javed; 4. Donna MacKinnon; 5. Maree Simmons			
Greens	1. Aiv Puglielli; 2. Sophia Sun; 3. Peter Gallagher; 4. Mohamud Hersi; 5. Liezl Shnookal			
Labour DLP	1. Cary De Wit; 2. Brenton Van Der Ende; 3. Peter Plaucs; 4. Jae Ho Hwang			
One Nation	1. Natalie Adams; 2. Maxwell Gratton; 3. Kane Afford			
Libertarian	1. Matthew Ford; 2. David Schwab			
Legalise Cannabis	1. Gianni Del Rosario-Makridis; 2. Thomas Forrest			
Family First	1. Alex van der End; 2. Jeremy Ngoh			
Victorian Socialists	1. Lucas Deviesseux; 2. Heather Maltby			
Democrats	1. Leonie Green; 2. Ryan Parris			
Sustainable Australia	1. Jack Corcoran; 2. William Clow			
Independent (Group J)	1. Wai Man Raymond Chow; 2. Yeung Yee Big Lily Chow			
Total formal votes				
Informal votes				
Turnout				

=== South-Eastern Metropolitan ===
2026 Victorian state election: South-Eastern Metropolitan
Party	Candidate	Votes	%	±%
Quota				
Liberal	1. Phillip Pease; 2. Ann-Marie Hermans; 3. Scott Fenner; 4. Marcus Fernandez; 5. Salini Vipinkumar			
Labor	1. Lee Tarlamis; 2. Michael Galea; 3. Ram Moti; 4. Soheang Pak; 5. Thanh Von Tran			
Greens	1. Matthew Kirwan; 2. Louisa Willoughby; 3. Samantha von Hagt; 4. Cara Kent; 5. Jayden Hardy			
One Nation	1. Colleen Harkin; 2. Geoff Goddard; 3. Leo Panetta			
Legalise Cannabis	1. Rachel Payne; 2. Gregory Denham			
Libertarian	1. David Limbrick; 2. Will Vandermeer			
Labour DLP	1. Andrew Zmegac; 2. Scott Marsh			
Victorian Socialists	1. Kelly Cvetkova; 2. Keeley Hopper			
Sustainable Australia	1. Brandon Hoult; 2. Ann-Marie Brady			
Democrats	1. Heath McKenzie; 2. Jacqui Morel			
Citizens	1. Gary Collie; 2. Russell Bennett			
Christian Alliance	1. Milton Wilde; 2. Leanne Wilde			
Independent	Susantha Abeysinghe			
Total formal votes				
Informal votes				
Turnout				

=== Southern Metropolitan ===
2026 Victorian state election: Southern Metropolitan
Party	Candidate	Votes	%	±%
Quota				
Liberal	1. David Davis; 2. Georgie Crozier; 3. Xavier Boffa; 4. Jamie Bell; 5. Jasmine Perera			
Labor	1. Lee Tarlamis; 2. Michael Galea; 3. Ram Moti; 4. Soheang Pak; 5. Thanh Von Tran			
Greens	1. Katherine Copsey; 2. Rachel Iampolski; 3. Jeff Kissubi; 4. Kim Samiotis; 5. Joshua Weaver			
One Nation	1. Aaron Sanford; 2. Kristina Kaulenas			
Legalise Cannabis	1. Zofia Pawlaczek; 2. Ben Howman			
Labour DLP	1. Karla Zmegac; 2. Paul Dean			
Family First	1. Jane Foreman; 2. Tom Paton			
Victorian Socialists	1. Catherine Holder; 2. April Worsley			
Democrats	1. Clive Jackson; 2. Phillip Broadbridge			
Sustainable Australia	1. Bettina Terry; 2. Linda Baird			
Independent (Group J)	1. Melissa Lowe; 2. Jess Ness			
Total formal votes				
Informal votes				
Turnout				

=== Western Metropolitan ===
2026 Victorian state election: Western Metropolitan
Party	Candidate	Votes	%	±%
Quota				
Liberal	1. Roshena Campbell; 2. Trung Luu; 3. Satish Patel; 4. Shwetha Narayanan; 5. Daniel Maduok Geng			
Labor	1. Lizzie Blandthorn; 2. Ingrid Stitt; 3. Cuc Lam; 4. Sara Ibrahim; 5. Kim Travers			
Greens	1. Katherine Copsey; 2. Rachel Iampolski; 3. Jeff Kissubi; 4. Kim Samiotis; 5. Joshua Weaver			
Victorian Socialists	1. Anneke Demanuele; 2. Jorge Jorquera; 3. Ella Sjodin; 4. Lucy Kelly; 5. Dean Maloney			
Family First	1. Moira Deeming; 2. Chris Neil; 3. Pavitra Kulkarni; 4. Mark Emerson; 5. Francine Ikirezi			
West Party	1. Joe Garra; 2. Sahana Ramesh; 3. Phil Farrelly			
One Nation	1. Aaron Sanford; 2. Kristina Kaulenas			
Legalise Cannabis	1. Xavier Menta; 2. Chana Berson			
Labour DLP	1. Mark Royal; 2. Arlene Smith			
Sustainable Australia	1. Dennis Bilic; 2. Susan Davies			
Democrats	1. Chris Thiery-Lai; 2. Nigel Keenan			
The Republican	1. Raj Saini; 2. Zalak Shar; 3. Kaur Sarajabit; 4. Shubhangi Kulkarni			
Independent	Rakesh Raizada			
Total formal votes				
Informal votes				
Turnout				
