= Members of the Victorian Legislative Council, 2022–2026 =

- ←2018–2022 2026–2030→

This is a list of members of the Victorian Legislative Council from 2022 to 2026.

== Distribution of seats ==
Region	1st MLC	2nd MLC	3rd MLC	4th MLC	5th MLC
Northern Metropolitan	Sheena Watt (Labor)	Evan Mulholland (Liberal)	Samantha Ratnam (Greens)	Enver Erdogan (Labor)	Adem Somyurek (Democratic Labour/ Independent) (Note: Adem Somyurek resigned from the Democratic Labour Party in March 2024.)
Northern Metropolitan	Sheena Watt (Labor)	Evan Mulholland (Liberal)	Anasina Gray-Barberio (Note: Samantha Ratnam resigned from parliament on 8 November 2024 and was replaced by Anasina Gray-Barberio on 13 November 2024.) (Greens)	Enver Erdogan (Labor)	Adem Somyurek (Democratic Labour/ Independent)
Southern Metropolitan	David Davis (Liberal)	John Berger (Labor)	Georgie Crozier (Liberal)	Katherine Copsey (Greens)	Ryan Batchelor (Labor)
North-Eastern Metropolitan	Shaun Leane (Labor)	Matthew Bach (Liberal)	Sonja Terpstra (Labor)	Nick McGowan (Liberal)	Aiv Puglielli (Greens)
North-Eastern Metropolitan	Shaun Leane (Labor)	Richard Welch (Note: Matthew Bach resigned from parliament on 87 December 2023 and was replaced by Richard Welch on 7 February 2024.) (Liberal)	Sonja Terpstra (Labor)	Nick McGowan (Liberal)	Aiv Puglielli (Greens)
South-Eastern Metropolitan	Lee Tarlamis (Labor)	Ann-Marie Hermans (Liberal)	Michael Galea (Labor)	Rachel Payne (Legalise Cannabis)	David Limbrick (Liberal Democrats/ Libertarian) (Note: The Liberal Democratic Party changed its name to the Libertarian Party in 2023.)
Western Metropolitan	Lizzie Blandthorn (Labor)	Moira Deeming (Liberal/Ind. Liberal/Liberal) (Note: Moira Deeming was expelled from the parliamentary Victorian Liberal Party in May 2023 and sat as an Independent Liberal until returning to the party room in December 2024.)	Ingrid Stitt (Labor)	David Ettershank (Legalise Cannabis)	Trung Luu (Liberal)
Northern Victoria	Wendy Lovell (Liberal)	Jaclyn Symes (Labor)	Gaelle Broad (Nationals)	Georgie Purcell (Animal Justice)	Rikkie-Lee Tyrrell (One Nation)
Eastern Victoria	Renee Heath (Liberal)	Tom McIntosh (Labor)	Melina Bath (Nationals)	Harriet Shing (Labor)	Jeff Bourman (SFF)
Western Victoria	Jacinta Ermacora (Labor)	Bev McArthur (Liberal)	Gayle Tierney (Labor)	Sarah Mansfield (Greens)	Joe McCracken (Liberal)

== Members ==
Image	Name	Party	Region	Years in office
	Matthew Bach (1983–)	Liberal	North-Eastern Metropolitan	2020–2023
	Ryan Batchelor	Labor	Southern Metropolitan	2022–present
	Melina Bath (1966–)	National	Eastern Victoria	2015–present
	John Berger	Labor	Southern Metropolitan	2022–present
	Lizzie Blandthorn (1977–)	Labor	Western Metropolitan	2022–present
	Jeff Bourman (1967–)	Shooters, Fishers and Farmers	Eastern Victoria	2014–present
	Gaelle Broad	National	Northern Victoria	2022–present
	Katherine Copsey	Greens	Southern Metropolitan	2022–present
	Georgie Crozier (1963–)	Liberal	Southern Metropolitan	2010–present
	David Davis (1962–)	Liberal	Southern Metropolitan	1996–present (Note: David Davis previously represented East Yarra Province from 1996 until the seat's abolition in 2006.)
	Moira Deeming (1983–)	Liberal	Western Metropolitan	2022–present
	Moira Deeming (1983–)	Independent Liberal	Western Metropolitan	2022–present
	Moira Deeming (1983–)	Liberal	Western Metropolitan	2022–present
	Enver Erdogan	Labor	Northern Metropolitan	2019–present (Note: Enver Erdogan previously represented Southern Metropolitan Region from 2019 until 2022.)
	Jacinta Ermacora	Labor	Western Victoria	2022–present
	David Ettershank	Legalise Cannabis	Western Metropolitan	2022–present
	Michael Galea	Labor	South-Eastern Metropolitan	2022–present
	Anasina Gray-Barberio	Greens	Northern Metropolitan	2024–present
	Renee Heath	Liberal	Eastern Victoria	2022–present
	Ann-Marie Hermans	Liberal	South-Eastern Metropolitan	2022–present
	Shaun Leane (1963–)	Labor	North-Eastern Metropolitan	2006–present
	David Limbrick	Liberal Democrats	South-Eastern Metropolitan	2018–2022; 2022–present
	David Limbrick	Libertarian	South-Eastern Metropolitan	2018–2022; 2022–present
	Wendy Lovell (1959–)	Liberal	Northern Victoria	2002–present (Note: Wendy Lovell previously represented North Eastern Province from 2002 until the seat's abolition in 2006.)
	Trung Luu	Liberal	Western Metropolitan	2022–present
	Sarah Mansfield	Greens	Western Victoria	2022–present
	Bev McArthur (1949–)	Liberal	Western Victoria	2018–present
	Joe McCracken	Liberal	Western Victoria	2022–present
	Nick McGowan	Liberal	North-Eastern Metropolitan	2022–present
	Tom McIntosh	Labor	Eastern Victoria	2022–present
	Evan Mulholland	Liberal	Northern Metropolitan	2022–present
	Rachel Payne	Legalise Cannabis	South-Eastern Metropolitan	2022–present
	Aiv Puglielli	Greens	North-Eastern Metropolitan	2022–present
	Georgie Purcell (1992–)	Animal Justice	Northern Victoria	2022–present
	Samantha Ratnam (1977–)	Greens	Northern Metropolitan	2017–2024
	Harriet Shing (1976–)	Labor	Eastern Victoria	2014–present
	Adem Somyurek (1967–)	Democratic Labour	Northern Metropolitan	2002–2022; 2022–present (Note: Adem Somyurek previously represented Eumemmerring Province from 2002 until the seat's abolition in 2006, and South-Eastern Metropolitan Region from 2006 until his resignation from parliament in 2022.)
	Adem Somyurek (1967–)	Independent	Northern Metropolitan	2002–2022; 2022–present
	Ingrid Stitt (1965/66–)	Labor	Western Metropolitan	2018–present
	Jaclyn Symes	Labor	Northern Victoria	2014–present
	Lee Tarlamis (1975–)	Labor	South-Eastern Metropolitan	2010–2014; 2020–present
	Sonja Terpstra	Labor	North-Eastern Metropolitan	2018–present
	Gayle Tierney	Labor	Western Victoria	2006–present
	Rikkie-Lee Tyrrell	One Nation	Northern Victoria	2022–present
	Sheena Watt	Labor	Northern Metropolitan	2020–present
	Richard Welch	Liberal	North-Eastern Metropolitan	2024–present

== See also ==
- Members of the Victorian Legislative Assembly, 2022–2026
