= Members of the Victorian Legislative Council, 2018–2022 =

- ←2014–2018 2022–2026→

This is a list of members of the Victorian Legislative Council, as elected at the 2018 state election. It includes members who were appointed to replace members who left office during this period.

== Current distribution of seats ==
Victorian Legislative Council
Party	Seats	
Party	2018	2022
Labor	18	16
Liberal-National coalition	11	10
Liberal	10	9
National	1	1
Derryn Hinch's Justice Party	3	2
Liberal Democrats	2	2
Animal Justice	1	1
Greens	1	1
Democratic Labour	0	1
Shooters, Fishers and Farmers	1	1
Reason	1	1
Sustainable Australia	1	1
Transport Matters	1	1
Independents	0	3
Total	40	40

Distribution after 2018 Victorian state election
Region	Seats held
Eastern Metropolitan	
Eastern Victoria	
Northern Metropolitan	
Northern Victoria	
South-Eastern Metropolitan	
Southern Metropolitan	
Western Metropolitan	
Western Victoria	

Distribution before 2022 Victorian state election
Region	Seats held
Eastern Metropolitan	
Eastern Victoria	
Northern Metropolitan	
Northern Victoria	
South-Eastern Metropolitan	
Southern Metropolitan	
Western Metropolitan	
Western Victoria	

== Members ==
Name	Party	Region	Term of office
Bruce Atkinson	Liberal	Eastern Metropolitan	1992–present
Matthew Bach^{[3]}	Liberal	Eastern Metropolitan	2020–present
Rod Barton	Transport Matters	Eastern Metropolitan	2018–present
Melina Bath	National	Eastern Victoria	2015–present
Jeff Bourman	Shooters, Fishers and Farmers	Eastern Victoria	2014–present
Cathrine Burnett-Wake^{[7]}	Liberal	Eastern Victoria	2021–present
Georgie Crozier	Liberal	Southern Metropolitan	2010–present
Catherine Cumming	Justice/Independent^{[1]}	Western Metropolitan	2018–present
Hon Philip Dalidakis^{[2]}	Labor	Southern Metropolitan	2014–2019
David Davis	Liberal	Southern Metropolitan	1996–present
Nazih Elasmar	Labor	Northern Metropolitan	2006–present
Enver Erdogan^{[2]}	Labor	Southern Metropolitan	2019–present
Bernie Finn	Liberal/Democratic Labour^{[10]}	Western Metropolitan	2006–present
Hon Jane Garrett^{[11]}	Labor	Eastern Victoria	2018–2022
Mark Gepp	Labor	Northern Victoria	2017–present
Stuart Grimley	Justice	Western Victoria	2018–present
Clifford Hayes	Sustainable Australia	Southern Metropolitan	2018–present
Hon Gavin Jennings^{[4]}	Labor	South Eastern Metropolitan	1999–2020
Tien Kieu	Labor	South Eastern Metropolitan	2018–present
Shaun Leane	Labor	Eastern Metropolitan	2006–present
David Limbrick^{[9]}	Liberal Democrats	South Eastern Metropolitan	2018–2022; 2022–present
Wendy Lovell	Liberal	Northern Victoria	2002–present
Tania Maxwell	Justice	Northern Victoria	2018–present
Bev McArthur	Liberal	Western Victoria	2018–present
Tom McIntosh^{[11]}	Labor	Eastern Victoria	2022–present
Andy Meddick	Animal Justice	Western Victoria	2018–present
Cesar Melhem	Labor	Western Metropolitan	2013–present
Hon Jenny Mikakos^{[6]}	Labor	Northern Metropolitan	1999–2020
Hon Edward O'Donohue^{[7]}	Liberal	Eastern Victoria	2006–2021
Craig Ondarchie	Liberal	Northern Metropolitan	2010–present
Fiona Patten	Reason	Northern Metropolitan	2014–present
Hon Jaala Pulford	Labor	Western Victoria	2006–present
Tim Quilty	Liberal Democrats	Northern Victoria	2018–present
Samantha Ratnam	Greens	Northern Metropolitan	2017–2024
Gordon Rich-Phillips	Liberal	South Eastern Metropolitan	1999–present
Harriet Shing	Labor	Eastern Victoria	2014–present
Adem Somyurek	Labor/Independent^{[5]}	South Eastern Metropolitan	2002–present
Ingrid Stitt	Labor	Western Metropolitan	2018–present
Jaclyn Symes	Labor	Northern Victoria	2014–present
Lee Tarlamis	Labor	South Eastern Metropolitan	2010–2014; 2020–present
Nina Taylor	Labor	Southern Metropolitan	2018–present
Sonja Terpstra	Labor	Eastern Metropolitan	2018–present
Hon Gayle Tierney	Labor	Western Victoria	2006–present
Kaushaliya Vaghela	Labor/Independent^{[8]}	Western Metropolitan	2018–present
Sheena Watt^{[6]}	Labor	Northern Metropolitan	2020–present
Mary Wooldridge^{[3]}	Liberal	Eastern Metropolitan	2014–2019

^{1} Justice MLC Catherine Cumming resigned from the party on 18 December 2018, before being sworn in, and served as an independent member.
^{2} Labor MLC Philip Dalidakis resigned on 17 June 2019. He was replaced by Enver Erdogan on 15 August 2019.
^{3} Liberal MLC Mary Wooldridge resigned on 8 December 2019. She was replaced by Matthew Bach on 5 March 2020.
^{4} Labor MLC Gavin Jennings resigned on 23 March 2020. He was replaced by Lee Tarlamis on 23 April 2020.
^{5} Labor MLC Adem Somyurek left the Labor Party to sit as an independent member on 15 June 2020.
^{6} Labor MLC Jenny Mikakos resigned on 26 September 2020. She was replaced by Sheena Watt on 13 October 2020.
^{7} Liberal MLC Edward O'Donohue resigned on 1 December 2021. He was replaced by Cathrine Burnett-Wake on 2 December 2021.
^{8} Labor MLC Kaushaliya Vaghela left the Labor Party to sit as an independent member on 7 March 2022.
^{9} Liberal Democrats MLC David Limbrick resigned on 11 April 2022. He returned to the seat on 22 June 2022.
^{10} Liberal MLC Bernie Finn was expelled from the Liberal Party on 24 May 2022 for "a series of inflammatory social media posts". He later joined the Democratic Labour Party on 2 June 2022.
^{11} Labor MLC Jane Garrett died on 2 July 2022. She was replaced by Tom McIntosh on 17 August 2022.
