= 2006 Victorian Legislative Council election =

Australian state election results

Victorian state election, 25 November 2006 Legislative Council << 2002–2010 >>
Enrolled voters	3,353,845				
Votes cast	3,110,172		Turnout	92.73	-0.39
Informal votes	133,243		Informal	4.28	+0.61
Summary of votes by party
Party	Primary votes	%	Swing	Seats	Change
Labor	1,234,082	41.45	-6.04	19	–6
Liberal	1,028,421	34.55	+0.04	15	+1
Greens	314,847	10.58	-0.29	3	+3
National	131,946	4.43	+0.06	2	-3
Family First	114,739	3.85	+3.85	0	±0
Democratic Labor	58,722	1.97	+1.97	1	+1
People Power	30,433	1.02	+1.02	0	± 0
Democrats	24,673	0.83	-0.96	0	± 0
Country Alliance	13,329	0.45	+0.45	0	± 0
Christian Democrats	5,819	0.20	+0.06	0	± 0
Socialist Alliance	1,130	0.04	+0.04	0	± 0
Other	18,788	0.63		0	± 0
Total	2,976,929			40	

This is a list of Legislative Council results for the Victorian 2006 state election.

The Greens would win its first seat in the Legislative Council. The party would win a seat at every election since, The Democratic Labour Party (DLP) won its first seat in the Victorian Parliament since 1955.

== Statewide results ==
Party	Votes	%	+/–	Seats	+/–
Labor	1,234,082	41.45	▼6.04	19	▼6
Liberal	1,028,421	34.55	▲0.04	15	▲1
Greens	314,847	10.58	▼0.29	3	▲3
National	131,946	4.43	▲0.06	2	▼3
Family First	114,739	3.85	New	0	New
Democratic Labour	58,722	1.97	▲1.97	1	▲1
People Power	30,433	1.02	New	0	New
Democrats	24,673	0.83	▼0.96	0	Steady
Independents	18,788	0.63	▼0.04	0	Steady
Country Alliance	13,329	0.45	New	0	New
Christian Democrats	5,819	0.20	▲0.06	0	Steady
Socialist Alliance	1,130	0.04	▼0.07	0	Steady
Total	2,976,929	100.00	–	40	–
Valid votes	2,976,929	95.72			
Invalid/blank votes	133,243	4.28	▲0.61		
Total votes	3,110,172	100.00	–		
Registered voters/turnout	3,353,845	92.73	▼0.39		

Legislative Council seats

Legislative Council Region	Seats held
Eastern Metropolitan Region	
Eastern Victoria Region	
Northern Metropolitan Region	
Northern Victoria Region	
South Eastern Metropolitan Region	
Southern Metropolitan Region	
Western Metropolitan Region	
Western Victoria Region	

Labor
Liberal
National
Green
Democratic Labor

== Results by region ==
=== Eastern Metropolitan ===
2006 Victorian state election: Eastern Metropolitan
Party	Candidate	Votes	%	±%
Quota		62,658		
Liberal	1. Richard Dalla-Riva (elected 1); 2. Bruce Atkinson (elected 3); 3. Jan Kronberg (elected 5); 4. Gladys Liu; 5. Matthew Koce	168,583	44.8	+0.5
Labor	1. Shaun Leane (elected 2); 2. Brian Tee (elected 4); 3. Andrew McKenzie; 4. Coral Delarue; 5. Mike Symon	135,264	36.0	−7.4
Greens	1. Bill Pemberton; 2. Kiera Perrott; 3. Nina Scott; 4. Howard Tankey; 5. Janet Powell	39,587	10.5	0.0
Family First	1. Chris Willis; 2. May Ng; 3. Fiona Bronte; 4. John Bridge; 5. Pat Murray	16,670	4.4	+4.4
Democratic Labor	1. Greg Byrne; 2. Ken Wells	5,837	1.6	+1.6
Democrats	1. Craig Beale; 2. Mary Dettman; 3. Rachel Aza	5,225	1.4	+0.8
People Power	1. Karin Open; 2. John Giles	4,781	1.3	+1.3
Total formal votes		375,947	96.9	+0.2
Informal votes		12,179	3.1	−0.2
Turnout		388,126	94.0	

=== Eastern Victoria ===
2006 Victorian state election: Eastern Victoria
Party	Candidate	Votes	%	±%
Quota		63,201		
Liberal	1. Philip Davis (elected 1); 2. Edward O'Donohue (elected 3); 3. Susie Manson; 4. Sarah Meredith; 5. Daniel Hyland	148,734	39.2	+2.2
Labor	1. Matt Viney (elected 2); 2. Johan Scheffer (elected 4); 3. Glenyys Romanes; 4. Gregg Cook; 5. Ann Dettrick	132,334	34.9	−5.7
Greens	1. Louis Delacretaz; 2. Jill Redwood; 3. George Beardsley; 4. Catheryn Thompson; 5. Daniel Jordan	34,745	9.2	−1.5
National	1. Peter Hall (elected 5); 2. Janice Coates; 3. Wesley Head; 4. Jenny Hammett; 5. Neville Buckland	32,623	8.6	−1.6
Family First	1. Cameron Eastman; 2. Joshua Reimer; 3. Wendy Buchanan; 4. Mark Harvey; 5. Marcus van Enik	16,895	4.5	+4.5
Democratic Labor	1. Pat Crea; 2. Pat Lamanna; 3. Margaret Hansen; 4. Teresa Evelyn-Liardet	4,467	1.2	+1.2
People Power	1. Gabriela Byrne; 2. Jodie Hughson	3,709	1.0	+1.0
Country Alliance	1. Andrew Jones; 2. Peter Kelly	2,334	0.6	+0.6
Group F	1. Henrie Ellis; 2. Stephen Pearman	1,725	0.45	+0.45
Christian Democrats	1. Wolfgang Voigt; 2. Eddie Brockhus	1,470	0.4	+0.4
Independent	Adnan Glibanovic	165	0.04	+0.04
Total formal votes		379,201	96.8	+0.1
Informal votes		12,625	3.2	−0.1
Turnout		391,826	93.8	

=== Northern Metropolitan ===
2006 Victorian state election: Northern Metropolitan
Party	Candidate	Votes	%	±%
Quota		60,025		
Labor	1. Theo Theophanous (elected 1); 2. Jenny Mikakos (elected 3); 3. Nazih Elasmar (elected 5); 4. Michele Ryan; 5. Joe Caputo	176,303	49.0	−8.5
Liberal	1. Matthew Guy (elected 2); 2. Dino de Marchi; 3. Emilia Arnus	83,634	23.2	+0.5
Greens	1. Greg Barber (elected 4); 2. Priya Carey; 3. Hoa Pham; 4. Glenn Osboldstone; 5. Daniel Marti	61,465	17.1	+0.3
Democratic Labor	1. John Mulholland; 2. Kevin Harwood	18,581	5.2	+5.2
Family First	1. Liz Bos; 2. Amy Shand; 3. Giacomo Angeli; 4. Roy Crea	10,117	2.8	+2.8
Democrats	1. Geoff Lutz; 2. Jessica Healy; 3. Robert Stone	4,521	1.3	−1.5
People Power	1. Barbara Biggs; 2. Vern Hughes	3,894	1.1	+1.1
Group D	1. Joseph Kaliniy; 2. Koulla Mesaritis; 3. Alexios Alexopoulos; 4. Mousti Senkul	1,634	0.5	+0.5
Total formal votes		360,149	94.3	−1.4
Informal votes		21,730	5.7	+1.4
Turnout		381,879	91.1	

=== Northern Victoria ===
2006 Victorian state election: Northern Victoria
Party	Candidate	Votes	%	±%
Quota		60,899		
Labor	1. Candy Broad (elected 1); 2. Kaye Darveniza (elected 5); 3. Marg Lewis; 4. Brad Dobson; 5. Jamie Byron	110,015	30.1	−7.3
Liberal	1. Wendy Lovell (elected 2); 2. Donna Petrovich (elected 4); 3. John Lithgow; 4. Zie Devereux; 5. Michael Gillies Smith	106,483	29.1	−0.7
National	1. Damian Drum (elected 3); 2. Rachel McAsey; 3. Justin Scholz; 4. Robert Mitchell; 5. Brian O'Sullivan	77,421	21.2	+1.9
Greens	1. Jennifer Alden; 2. Jon Baly; 3. Jenny O'Connor	26,603	7.3	+0.5
Family First	1. Nathan Hulls; 2. Mary Lou Corboy; 3. Nathanael Valentine; 4. Helen Leach	13,381	3.7	+3.7
Democratic Labor	1. Andrew Robinson; 2. Paul McCormack; 3. Sharon Lane	7,841	2.1	+2.1
Country Alliance	1. Danny Lee; 2. Fred Goodwin	7,495	2.1	+2.1
Group E	1. Stefano de Pieri; 2. Helen Healy; 3. Geoff Brown; 4. Joe Rocca; 5. Neil Fettling	7,487	2.1	+2.1
Group H	1. Laurie Whelan; 2. Peter O'Brien	4,287	1.2	+1.2
People Power	1. Denise Allen; 2. Phil Bachmann	2,497	0.7	+0.7
Christian Democrats	1. Phil Seymour; 2. Ewan McDonald	1,881	0.5	−0.1
Total formal votes		365,391	95.9	−0.5
Informal votes		15,426	4.1	+0.5
Turnout		380,817	93.3	

=== South Eastern Metropolitan ===
2006 Victorian state election: South Eastern Metropolitan
Party	Candidate	Votes	%	±%
Quota		60,925		
Labor	1. Gavin Jennings (elected 1); 2. Adem Somyurek (elected 3); 3. Bob Smith (elected 5); 4. Vince Rossi; 5. Shilana Yip	181,986	49.8	−4.4
Liberal	1. Gordon Rich-Phillips (elected 2); 2. Inga Peulich (elected 4); 3. Ken Ong; 4. Susanne La Fontaine; 5. John Aivaliotis	123,067	33.7	−0.9
Greens	1. Jim Reiher; 2. Nicole Avery; 3. Dean Andrew	26,408	7.2	−1.8
Family First	1. Ann-Marie Hermans; 2. Steven Ashdown; 3. Ann Ross; 4. Annette Blazé	19,238	5.3	+5.3
Democrats	1. Karen Bailey; 2. David Batten; 3. Daniel Berk	4,967	1.4	−0.8
Democratic Labor	1. Denise de Graaff; 2. Frances Murphy	3,276	0.9	+0.9
People Power	1. Linda Hancock; 2. Maria Pazaitis	2,580	0.7	+0.7
Christian Democrats	1. Sandra Herrmann; 2. Jenny Zuiderwyk	2,468	0.7	+0.7
Group E	1. Geraldine Gonsalvez; 2. Julie Boustead	1,557	0.4	+0.4
Total formal votes		365,547	94.8	−1.3
Informal votes		20,200	5.2	+1.3
Turnout		385,747	93.4	

=== Southern Metropolitan ===
2006 Victorian state election: Southern Metropolitan
Party	Candidate	Votes	%	±%
Quota		60,301		
Liberal	1. David Davis (elected 1); 2. Andrea Coote (elected 3); 3. David Southwick; 4. Michael Heffernan; 5. Kaye Farrow	167,202	46.2	+2.1
Labor	1. John Lenders (elected 2); 2. Evan Thornley (elected 5); 3. Shelly Freeman; 4. Alexandria Hicks; 5. Pablo Salina	112,762	31.2	−6.7
Greens	1. Sue Pennicuik (elected 4); 2. Heather Welsh; 3. Ray Walford; 4. Clare Pilcher; 5. Teresa Puszka	56,816	15.7	+0.3
Family First	1. John McSwiney; 2. John Friebel; 3. Brian Campbell	7,894	2.2	+2.2
Democrats	1. Paul Kavanagh; 2. Margaret Mitsikas; 3. John Mathieson	6,219	1.7	−0.4
People Power	1. Stephen Mayne; 2. Judith Voce	4,952	1.4	+1.4
Democratic Labor	1. Gerry Flood; 2. Brian Maunder; 3. Terry O'Hanlon	4,206	1.2	+1.2
Group C	1. Rita Bentley; 2. Geoff Taylor	1,439	0.4	+0.4
Independent	John Myers	315	0.1	+0.1
Total formal votes		361,805	96.9	+0.1
Informal votes		11,420	3.1	−0.1
Turnout		373,225	90.2	

=== Western Metropolitan ===
2006 Victorian state election: Western Metropolitan
Party	Candidate	Votes	%	±%
Quota		62,402		
Labor	1. Justin Madden (elected 1); 2. Khalil Eideh (elected 3); 3. Martin Pakula (elected 4); 4. Henry Barlow; 5. Lisa Zanatta	219,706	58.7	−3.5
Liberal	1. Bernie Finn (elected 2); 2. Stephen Reynolds; 3. Wayne Tseng; 4. Ann Bitans	91,604	24.5	−1.2
Greens	1. Colleen Hartland (elected 5); 2. Nam Bui; 3. Robert Humphreys; 4. Liz Ingham; 5. Nora Tchekmeyan	35,201	9.4	−0.2
Family First	1. Ashley Alp; 2. Anh Nguyen; 3. Robert Walker; 4. Marie Spataro; 5. Roger San Jose	15,032	4.0	+4.0
People Power	1. Max Jackson; 2. Christine Williams	5,098	1.4	+1.4
Democratic Labor	1. Mark Beshara; 2. Shane McCarthy	4,029	1.1	+1.1
Democrats	1. Robert Livesay; 2. Danii Coric; 3. Roger Howe	3,741	1.0	−1.6
Total formal votes		374,411	93.7	−1.5
Informal votes		25,075	6.3	+1.5
Turnout		399,486	92.5	

=== Western Victoria ===
2006 Victorian state election: Western Victoria
Party	Candidate	Votes	%	±%
Quota		65,747		
Labor	1. Jaala Pulford (elected 1); 2. Gayle Tierney (elected 3); 3. Elaine Carbines; 4. Christine Couzens; 5. Chris Papas	165,712	42.0	−5.3
Liberal	1. John Vogels (elected 2); 2. David Koch (elected 4); 3. Kate Bullen; 4. Paul Johnston; 5. John Oxley	139,114	35.3	−1.9
Greens	1. Marcus Ward; 2. Gillian Blair; 3. Stephen Chenery; 4. Karen McAloon; 5. Judy Cameron	34,022	8.6	+0.4
National	1. Samantha McIntosh; 2. Peter McIntyre	21,902	5.6	+0.3
Family First	1. Gordon Alderson; 2. Monique Podbury; 3. Michael Croot; 4. Anna Jennings; 5. Michael Albers	15,512	3.9	+3.9
Democratic Labor	1. Peter Kavanagh (elected 5); 2. Clare Power; 3. David Power; 4. Michael Casanova; 5. Leanne Casanova	10,485	2.7	+2.7
Country Alliance	1. Miles Hodge; 2. Ron Heath	3,500	0.9	+0.9
People Power	1. Greg Jones; 2. Lachlan Jones	2,922	0.7	+0.7
Socialist Alliance	1. Sue Bull; 2. Rowan Stewart	1,130	0.3	+0.3
Independent	John Camilleri	179	0.05	+0.05
Total formal votes		394,478	96.4	−0.5
Informal votes		14,588	3.6	+0.5
Turnout		409,066	93.5	

== See also ==
- 2006 Victorian state election
- Candidates of the 2006 Victorian state election
