= Michael Galea =

Michael Galea may refer to:

- Michael Galea (footballer), Maltese association football player
- Michael Galea (politician), Australian politician
