= Nina Springle =

Australian politician (born 1973)

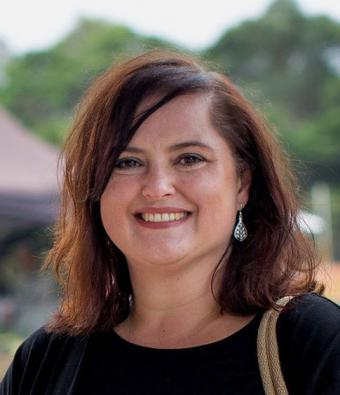

Deputy Leader of the Victorian Greens
- In office 12 October 2017 – 19 December 2018
- Leader: Samantha Ratnam
- Preceded by: Position established
- Succeeded by: Ellen Sandell

Member of the Victorian Legislative Council for South Eastern Metropolitan Region
- In office 29 November 2014 – 24 November 2018

Personal details
- Born: Nina Meredith Springle; 6 March 1973 (age 53) Melbourne, Victoria, Australia
- Party: Reason (2022–2024)
- Other political affiliations: Greens (until 2019)
- Children: Two
- Education: Deakin University
- Website: http://ninaspringle.com

Nina Meredith Springle (born 6 March 1973) is an Australian politician. She was a Greens member of the Victorian Legislative Council, having represented South Eastern Metropolitan Region from 2014 to 2018.

In 2014, Springle became the first Greens MP to represent the South Eastern Metropolitan Region in the Victorian Parliament. Springle has worked as a consultant in the community and education sectors.

During her term of office, Springle was the Victorian Greens spokesperson for Families and Children, Multicultural Affairs, Women, Health, Youth Justice, Prevention of Family Violence, Older People, Employment, Industrial Relations, Industry & Trade, Small Business, Digital Rights and Waste Management.

Nina Springle initiated the "Plastic Free Sea" campaign, which aimed to stop marine plastic pollution in Victoria, and has worked on developing a container deposit scheme to reduce plastic and metal litter.

Springle was appointed the first Deputy Leader of the Victorian Greens on 12 October 2017, a role she retained until losing her seat at the 2018 state election. She resigned from the party after the election, citing dissatisfaction with the "party establishment" and its response to the loss of seats, and later of 'being fixated on identity politics.'

On 9 November 2022, Springle announced that she would be contesting North-Eastern Metropolitan Region representing the Reason Party in the Legislative Council at the 2022 state election.
