= Gavin Jennings =

Australian politician

The Honourable Gavin Jennings
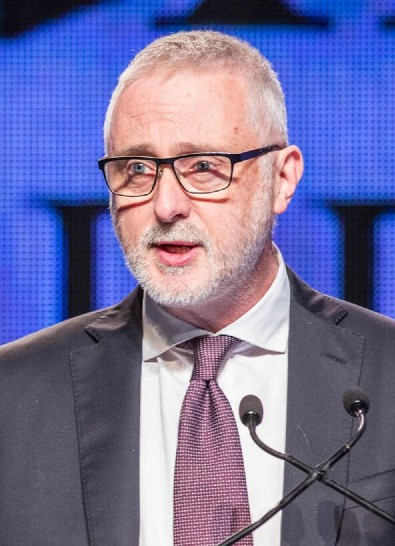
- Jennings in 2017

Member of the Victorian Legislative Council
- In office 18 September 1999 – 25 November 2006
- Constituency: Melbourne Province
- In office 25 November 2006 – 23 March 2020
- Constituency: South Eastern Metropolitan Region

Personal details
- Born: 18 April 1957 (age 69)
- Party: Labor Party

Gavin Wayne Jennings (born 18 April 1957) is an Australian politician. He was a Labor Party member of the Victorian Legislative Council from 1999 to 2020, representing Melbourne Province (1999–2006) and then the South Eastern Metropolitan Region (2006–2020) . He was Leader of the Government in the Legislative Council and Special Minister of State in the Andrews Ministry from 2014 to 2020.

He previously served as Cabinet Secretary (1999–2002), Minister for Aged Care (2002–2006), Minister for Aboriginal Affairs (2006–2007), Minister for Community Services (2006–2007), Minister for Environment and Climate Change (2007–2010) and Minister for Innovation (2007–2010) in the Bracks Ministry and Brumby Ministry. He had also been Deputy Leader of the Government in the Legislative Council from 1999 to 2010. Jennings is a leading member of the party's Socialist Left faction.

== Career ==
Jennings studied at Beaufort High School and Monash University, attaining degrees in arts and social work. He worked at various times as a factory worker, actuarial clerk, actor, social worker and policy analyst. He was employed as an adviser to Cain government minister Kay Setches between 1988 and 1990, and then to Premiers John Cain and Joan Kirner between 1990 and 1992. After the defeat of the Kirner government at the 1992 state election, Jennings began working as an industrial officer, working for the Public Transport Union, Liquor, Hospitality and Miscellaneous Union and Electrical Trades Union at various times until his election to parliament.

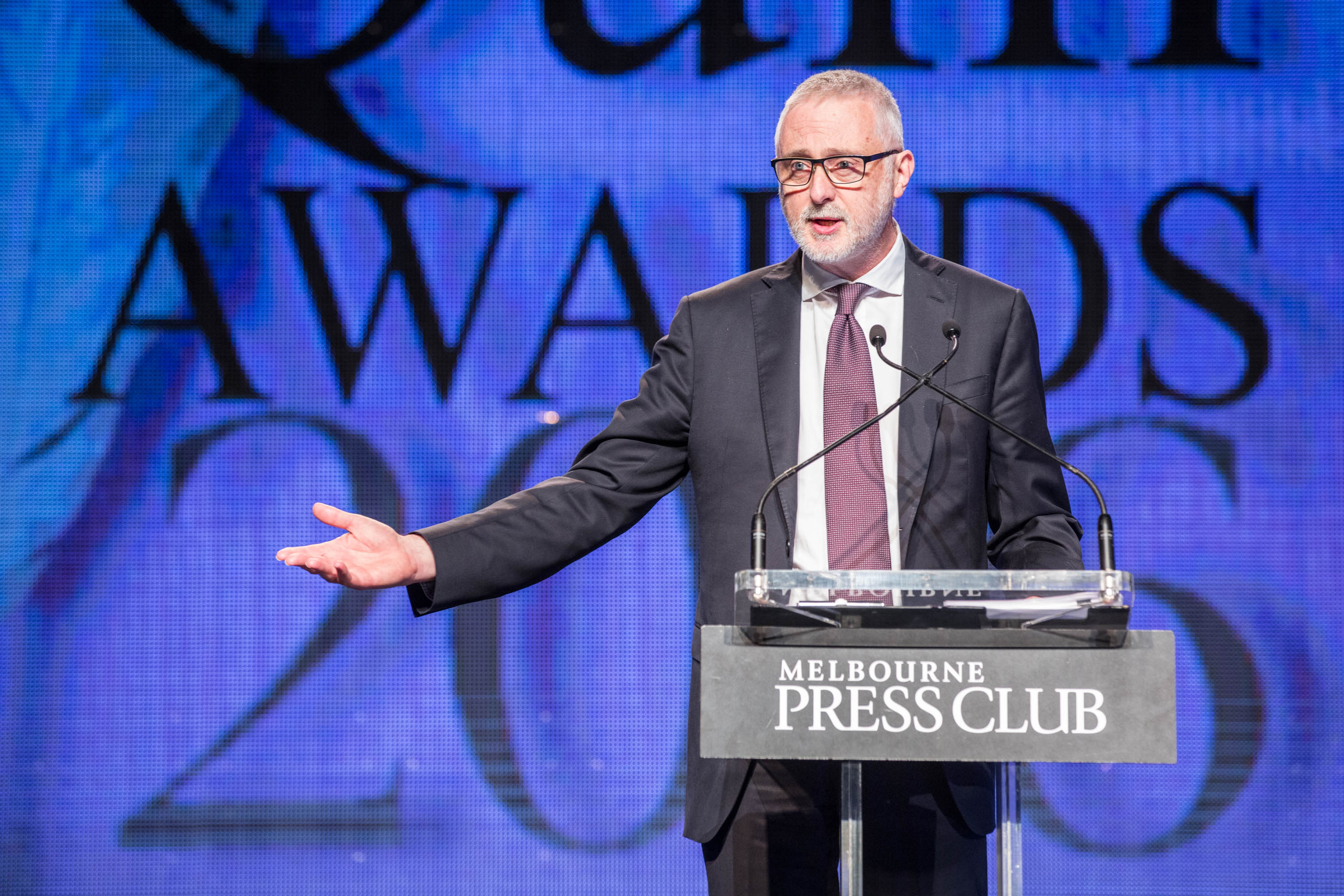
Jennings speaking at the Melbourne Press Club Quill Awards in March 2017

Jennings won preselection for the safe Labor Legislative Council seat of Melbourne Province in advance of the 1999 state election, and was thus easily elected. He was immediately appointed as Cabinet Secretary and Deputy Leader of the Government in the Legislative Council. He was promoted to the ministry after the 2002 state election, serving as Minister for Aged Care and Minister for Aboriginal Affairs. He was shifted from the aged care to the community services portfolio after the 2006 state election. He received a significant promotion in the wake of John Brumby's accession to the premiership in August 2007, receiving the portfolios of the environment and climate change, and innovation.

On 25 May 2016, the Legislative Council passed a contempt motion against Jennings, effectively suspending him from parliament for up to six months, unless he released documents to the Upper House relating to the Victorian Comprehensive Cancer Centre.

In March 2020, Jennings announced that he was resigning from the Victorian Parliament. The premier, Daniel Andrews, said the Labor movement was "more confident, more courageous and more compasionate" because of Jennings. On the 23 April 2020, former MP and member of the party's Left faction Lee Tarlamis was sworn in as Jennings's replacement.

Political offices
Preceded by Keith Hamilton	Minister for Aboriginal Affairs; 2006–2007	Succeeded by Richard Wynne
Preceded by Bronwyn Pike	Minister for Aged Care; 2002–2006	Succeeded by Lisa Neville
Preceded by Bronwyn Pike	Minister for Community Services; 2006–2007	Succeeded by Lisa Neville
Preceded by John Thwaites	Minister for Environment and Climate Change; 2007–2010	Succeeded by Ryan Smith
Preceded by John Brumby	Minister for Innovation; 2007–2010	Succeeded by Louise Asher
New ministry	Special Minister of State; 2014–2020	None
