= Tien Kieu =

Australian physicist and politician

Tien Kieu MLC

Member of the Victorian Legislative Council for South Eastern Metropolitan Region
- In office 24 November 2018 – 26 November 2022

Personal details
- Born: Kiều Tiến Dũng; 25 October 1960 (age 65) Saigon, Vietnam
- Party: Australian Labor Party
- Occupation: Physicist

Tien Dung Kieu (Vietnamese: Kiều Tiến Dũng; born 25 October 1960) is an Australian physicist and former politician. He was a Labor Party member of the Victorian Legislative Council since 2018, representing South Eastern Metropolitan Region. He was defeated at the 2022 state election.

Kieu, a child of war, was born in Saigon, Vietnam in 1961. At age 19 in 1980, he and his wife Liem left Vietnam as refugees on a boat to Malaysia, where they lived in a refugee camp until they were approached by Australian officials and offered passage and resettlement in Brisbane. Kieu worked as a labourer before enrolling at the University of Queensland, studying a Bachelor of Science, specialising in Physics and Applied Mathematics and graduating with First Class Honours and a University Gold Medal. This began an academic career in econophysics which took him to the University of Edinburgh and Oxford University, and then to the United States as a Fulbright scholar at Columbia, Princeton and MIT, before returning to Australia to work as an adjunct professor at Swinburne University of Technology in Melbourne.
