= Andrews Ministry =

Andrews ministry may refer to the below three ministries led by Victorian Premier Daniel Andrews:

- First Andrews ministry, December 2014 to November 2018
- Second Andrews ministry, November 2018 to December 2022
- Third Andrews ministry, December 2022 to September 2023
