= Sam Drummond =

Australian disability rights activist, lawyer and writer

Drummond in 2026

Sam Drummond (born 1986) is an Australian disability rights activist, lawyer, broadcaster, podcaster and writer. His work focuses on disability, social policy and inequality, particularly through media, advocacy and writing.

== Early life and education ==
Drummond grew up between Melbourne, Australia, and the nearby regional Victorian town of Castlemaine with his mother and brother. He was diagnosed in early childhood with pseudoachondroplasia, a form of dwarfism affecting bone growth and joint health.

He has spoken publicly about his experiences growing up with disability, including his desire to be treated as “completely ordinary” rather than exceptional.

His upbringing, including experiences of disability and single parent families, has been discussed in media interviews and his later writing.

He attended Monash University, where he completed a Bachelor of Laws and a Bachelor of Arts, majoring in philosophy.

== Career ==
Drummond has worked in radio, politics and law, specialising in discrimination and human rights law.

He gained public prominence speaking about disability representation and discrimination in Australian media and culture, disability and religious discrimination laws, and parenting with a disability.

Drummond's early writing included commentary for the ABC's disability platform Ramp Up, which was edited by disability activist Stella Young.

In 2023, Drummond published the memoir Broke, which explores disability, rural disadvantage and single parent families.

He has also contributed to a number of anthologies, including Raging Grace: Australian Writers Speak Out on Disability, Teacher Teacher, Growing Up Disabled in Australia, and We’ve Got This: Stories of Disabled Parents.

Drummond has hosted several podcast series focused on disability, community and social inclusion. Most notably, this included Building Inclusion: Australia's Disability Strategy, a podcast exploring disability policy and experiences of people with disability in Australia.

== Personal life ==
Drummond lives in Melbourne, Australia, with his partner and their child.

He has spoken publicly about disability and parenting, including his experiences as a primary caregiver.

== Works ==
- Broke (Affirm Press, 2023)
- Teacher Teacher (Black Inc, 2023)
- We've Got This: stories by disabled parents (Black Inc, 2022)
- Growing Up In Australia (Black Inc, 2021)
- Growing Up Disabled In Australia (Black Inc, 2021)
