= Gordon Rich-Phillips =

Australian politician

The Honourable Gordon Rich-Phillips
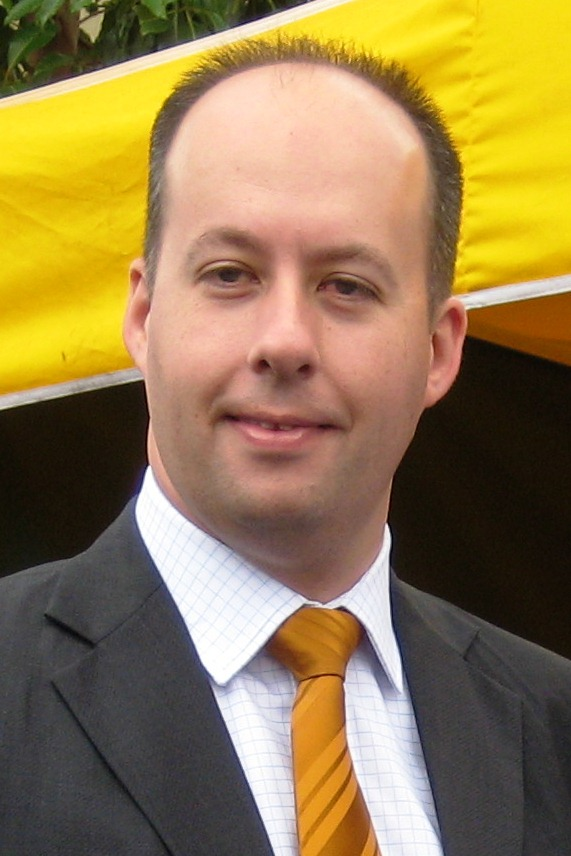
- Gordon Rich-Phillips

Assistant Treasurer
- In office 2 December 2010 – 4 December 2014
- Succeeded by: Ministry abolished

Minister for the Aviation Industry
- In office 2 December 2010 – 4 December 2014
- Preceded by: inaugural
- Succeeded by: Ministry abolished

Minister for Technology
- In office 2 December 2010 – 4 December 2014
- Preceded by: John Lenders
- Succeeded by: Adem Somyurek

Member of the Victorian Legislative Council for South Eastern Metropolitan Region
- In office 25 November 2006 – 26 November 2022

Member of the Victorian Legislative Council for Eumemmerring Province
- In office 19 September 1999 – 24 November 2006
- Preceded by: Ron Wells
- Succeeded by: Seat abolished

Personal details
- Born: 8 July 1974 (age 52) Dandenong, Victoria, Australia
- Party: Liberal Party
- Education: Monash University; RMIT University
- Website: Rich-Phillips.com.au

Gordon Kenneth Rich-Phillips (born 8 July 1974) is a former Australian politician. He was a Liberal Party member of the Victorian Legislative Council between 1999 and 2022, representing the Eumemmerring Province (1999–2006) and the South Eastern Metropolitan Region (2006–2022).

First elected at the age of 25, he was the youngest person elected to the Legislative Council. He was Assistant Treasurer, Minister for Technology and Minister for the Aviation Industry from 2010 to 2014, serving in the Baillieu and Napthine governments. He was elected Deputy Leader of the Liberal Party in the Legislative Council in December 2014.

== Early life and career ==
Rich-Phillips was educated at Eumemmering Secondary College, where he was school dux. He studied aerospace engineering at RMIT University and Monash University, and subsequently studied business at Monash University. He worked in economic research and analysis before entering politics, and was aviation manager for the Department of State Development at the time of his election. He also holds a commercial pilot's license, and was actively involved in a number of campaigns with the Aircraft Owners and Pilots Association of Australia.

He was elected to the Legislative Council for Eumemmerring Province at the 1999 state election, succeeding retiring Liberal Ron Wells. He transferred to the new South Eastern Metropolitan Region upon the reorganisation of the Legislative Council in 2002. Rich-Phillips was elected secretary of the parliamentary Liberal Party in 2002, and served as Liberal spokesperson for sport and recreation (2002–2004), Commonwealth Games (2002–2005), and manufacturing and exports (2004–2005). He was promoted to shadow cabinet in December 2005, and served as shadow minister for finance, the Transport Accident Commission and Commonwealth Games (2005–2006), finance (2006–2007 and 2008–2009) information technology (2007–2010), community development (2008–2010), and assistant shadow treasurer, shadow minister for the aviation industry and shadow minister for federal/state relations (2009–2010).

Rich-Phillips was appointed Assistant Treasurer, Minister for WorkCover, Minister for the Aviation Industry and Minister for Technology upon the Liberal-National coalition victory at the 2010 state election.

In 2014, Rich-Phillips was criticised when as Aviation Industry Minister he oversaw the awarding of a $1m grant to the privately owned Peninsula Aero Club, where he stored his plane and was an active member.

On 17 June 2022, Rich-Phillips announced that he would not be recontesting his seat at the 2022 Victorian state election.

Victorian Legislative Council
Preceded by Inaugural	Member for South Eastern Metropolitan Region; 2006–2022	Succeeded by Ann-Marie Hermans
Preceded by Ron Wells	Member for Eumemmerring Province; 1999–2006	Succeeded by Province abolished
