= Tom McIntosh (politician) =

Australian politician

Member of the Victorian Legislative Council for Eastern Victoria Region
- Incumbent
- Assumed office 17 August 2022
- Preceded by: Jane Garrett

Personal details
- Party: Labor Party

Tom McIntosh is an Australian politician who has been a Labor member of the Victorian Legislative Council, having represented the Eastern Victoria Region since August 2022. He was appointed by a joint sitting of the Victorian Parliament on 17 August 2022 to fill a vacancy brought about by the death of Jane Garrett.

Prior to entering politics, McIntosh has worked as an electrician and staffer to federal Labor MP Ged Kearney.

== Early life and education ==
Before entering Parliament, McIntosh grew up the son of a shearer and teacher on the family farm. He completed his electrical apprenticeship at Ballarat TAFE, and worked the following decade as an electrician.

Victorian Legislative Council
Preceded by Jane Garrett	Member for Eastern Victoria Region; 2022–present	Incumbent
