= Rachel Payne =

Australian politician

Rachel Payne MLC

Member of the Victorian Legislative Council for South-Eastern Metropolitan Region
- Incumbent
- Assumed office 26 November 2022
- Preceded by: Adem Somyurek

Personal details
- Party: Legalise Cannabis
- Other political affiliations: Reason (2019–2020)
- Website: https://rachelpayne.com.au/

Rachel Payne is an Australian politician. She is a member of the Victorian Legislative Council representing the South-Eastern Metropolitan Region since 26 November 2022. Payne is a member of Legalise Cannabis Victoria.

== Early life, university and career ==
Payne grew up in a working-class family in Newcastle and went to university, gaining a Master of Public Policy. Payne also has an undergraduate degree in sociology and politics.

Payne was previously the executive of the EROS Association and worked in the Family Court of Australia and Centrelink.

== Politics ==
Payne ran for the Reason Party in the 2019 federal election in the seat of Menzies, receiving just over 2% of the vote.

A year later, she again ran for Reason, this time in the City of Moreland in the 2020 Victorian local elections.

Payne was elected to the Victorian Legislative Council for the South-Eastern Metropolitan Region in 2022 as a Legalise Cannabis Victoria candidate.

In 2025, Payne was nominated for the McKinnon Emerging Political Leader of the Year award.
