= Legalise Cannabis Australia =

Legalise Cannabis Australia Legalise Cannabis Party
- Abbreviation: LCA; LCP
- President: Michael Balderstone
- Founder: Nigel Quinlan
- Founded: 1993; 33 years ago
- Headquarters: Nimbin, New South Wales
- Ideology: Cannabis legalisation
- Political position: Big tent
- Colours: Green
- Other names: Legalise Cannabis Party; Historically: Help End Marijuana Prohibition (HEMP) Party
- House of Representatives: 0 / 151
- Senate: 0 / 76
- NSW Legislative Council: 1 / 42
- Victorian Legislative Council: 2 / 40
- WA Legislative Council: 1 / 36
- Rockingham City Council: 1 / 13

Website
- legalisecannabis.org.au

Legalise Cannabis Australia (LCA), also known as the Legalise Cannabis Party (LCP) and formerly the Help End Marijuana Prohibition (HEMP) Party, is a single-issue Australian political party. It has a number of policies that centre around the re-legalisation and regulation of cannabis for personal, medicinal and industrial uses in Australia.

The party's headquarters were based in Nimbin, New South Wales, which is known to have a high population of recreational cannabis users and hippies.

== History ==
=== Formation ===
The group was founded in 1993 by Nigel Quinlan, who later ran as a senate candidate for Queensland in the 2001 federal election under the name Nigel Freemarijuana. In 2001, Freemarijuana's name was assessed by the Australian Electoral Commission as to whether it was suitable to be added to the electoral roll – the Commission found that it was, meaning Freemarijuana could run as an electoral candidate under the name.

=== Deregistration and re-registration ===
In 2007, prior to the 2007 federal election, HEMP was de-registered as a political party by the Australian Electoral Commission after a random audit of its membership. The group re-applied for party registration in February 2010, but according to HEMP secretary Graham Askey, delays in processing their application meant that registration did not proceed in time before the 2010 federal election was called. It was formally re-registered on 23 September 2010.

=== Name change ===
At the party's AGM held on 11 September 2021, a name change was proposed to change the party's name to Legalise Cannabis Australia, which was passed in a vote by party members.

== State and territory affiliates ==
The party's current affiliates are the following:

Division	Leader	Lower House	Upper House	Status
Legalise Cannabis Western Australia	Brian Walker	0 / 59	1 / 36	Crossbench
Legalise Cannabis Queensland		0 / 93	None	Extra-parliamentary
Legalise Cannabis SA		0 / 47	0 / 22	Extra-parliamentary
Legalise Cannabis NSW	Jeremy Buckingham	0 / 93	1 / 42	Crossbench
Legalise Cannabis Victoria		0 / 88	2 / 40	Crossbench

== Electoral results ==
LCP has stood candidates in several federal and state elections, since its formation.

The party received a nationwide Senate vote of 0.71 percent at the 2013 federal election. Historically the party's best result was at the 1994 Elizabeth by-election in South Australia with a 5.37 percent primary vote.

For the 2016 federal election, the (HEMP) Party fielded two candidates for the Senate in New South Wales, but only one each in the Northern Territory, Queensland, South Australia, Tasmania and Western Australia. So that the candidates did not end up in the "ungrouped" column, they teamed up with the Australian Sex Party which also fielded a single senate candidate in most states. It also fielded a candidate for the Division of Solomon in the House of Representatives.

The HEMP Party scored well in the 2019 federal election with over 260,000 votes and 1.8% of the primary senate vote.

Michael Balderstone ran in the 2020 Eden-Monaro by-election and received 2.3% of votes beating out almost every other minor party.

At the 2021 Western Australian state election, the Party's local affiliate, Legalise Cannabis WA, were successful in gaining two seats in the Legislative Council, marking the first parliamentary representation for HEMP or its state affiliate parties.

At the 2022 Victorian state election the party had two candidates elected to the Legislative Council, David Ettershank and Rachel Payne.

At the 2023 NSW state election, former Greens MP Jeremy Buckingham was elected to the Legislative Council. He was the first politician in Australian history to produce a bud of cannabis during a Parliamentary session.

In the 2024 Queensland by-election, LCP candidate Lindsay Melody gained a primary vote of 14.57% in the outer suburban seat of Ipswich West - a new high for the party.

=== House of Representatives ===
Election	Votes	%	Seats won	Total seats	Status
2022	6,025	0.04 (#23)	0	0 / 150	Extra-parliamentary
2025	186,335	1.20 (#7)	0	0 / 150	Extra-parliamentary

=== Senate ===
Election	Votes	%	Seats won	Total seats	±	Status
1996	3,836 (Note: A candidate named "J Freemarijuana" led the unregistered Group G party ticket in Queensland.)	0.00 (#21)	0 / 40	0 / 76	0	Extra-parliamentary
1998	0	—N/a	0 / 40	0 / 76	0	Extra-parliamentary
2001	63,648	0.55 (#10)	0 / 40	0 / 76	0	Extra-parliamentary
2004	41,501	0.35 (#11)	0 / 40	0 / 76	0	Extra-parliamentary
2007	0 (Note: The Help End Marijuana Prohibition Party was de-registered by the Australian Electoral Commission before the 2007 election, and re-registered after the 2010 election.)	—N/a	0 / 40	0 / 76	0	Extra-parliamentary
2010	0	—N/a	0 / 40	0 / 76	0	Extra-parliamentary
2013	95,430	0.71 (#12)	0 / 40	0 / 76	0	Extra-parliamentary
2016	106,326 (Note: The party ran on a joint ticket with the Australian Sex Party in Queensland, Western Australia, South Australia, Tasmania, and the Northern Territory.)	0.76 (#12)	0 / 76	0 / 76	0	Extra-parliamentary
2019	262,426	1.80 (#6)	0 / 40	0 / 76	0	Extra-parliamentary
2022	501,421	3.33 (#6)	0 / 40	0 / 76	0	Extra-parliamentary
2025	553,163	3.49 (#5)	0 / 40	0 / 76	0	Extra-parliamentary

== Elected representatives ==
=== Current ===
==== New South Wales ====
Image	Officeholder	Office	Term	Notes
	Jeremy Buckingham (born 1973)	Member of the Legislative Council	20 April 2023 − present	Incumbent

==== Victoria ====
Image	Officeholder	Office	Term	Notes
	David Ettershank	MLC for Western Metropolitan Region	26 November 2022 − present	Incumbent
	Rachel Payne	MLC for South-Eastern Metropolitan Region	26 November 2022 − present	Incumbent

==== Western Australia ====
Image	Officeholder	Office	Term	Notes
	Brian Walker (born 1954)	MLC for East Metropolitan Region	22 May 2021 − present	Leader of Legalise Cannabis WA since 2024. Incumbent

=== Former ===
==== Western Australia ====
Image	Officeholder	Office	Term	Notes
	Sophia Moermond (born 1968)	MLC for South West Region	22 May 2021 − 9 May 2024	Left party

== See also ==
- Australian National Council on Drugs
- Cannabis in Australia
- Cannabis political parties
- Crime in Australia
- Drug policy reform
- Illicit drug use in Australia
- Network Against Prohibition
