= Ann-Marie Hermans =

Australian politician

Ann-Marie Hermans MLC
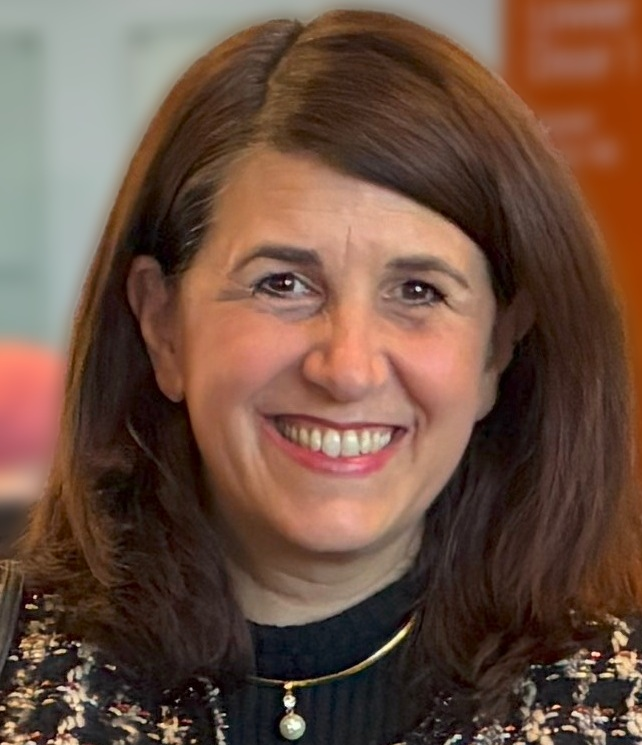
- Hermans in 2025

Member of the Victorian Legislative Council for South-Eastern Metropolitan Region
- Incumbent
- Assumed office 26 November 2022
- Preceded by: Gordon Rich-Phillips

Personal details
- Party: Liberal
- Other political affiliations: Family First (2004−2006)
- Children: 4
- Occupation: Teacher

Ann-Marie Hermans is an Australian politician and a member of the Liberal Party. She has served as a member of the Victorian Legislative Council, representing the South-Eastern Metropolitan Region since November 2022, and the Shadow Assistant Minister for Education in the Battin Shadow Ministry.

After her election to the Legislative Council, she was appointed as the Shadow Minister for Emergency Services, and Shadow Minister for WorkCover and the TAC, in the Pesutto shadow cabinet. On 31 August 2023, she became the Shadow Cabinet Secretary, a role she held until 7 January 2025, at which point she became the Shadow Assistant Minister for Education. Before joining the Liberals, she ran for Family First at the 2006 Victorian state election.

Hermans was a teacher at Presbyterian Ladies' College prior to entering politics.

Hermans is considered part of the "religious right" faction of the Victorian Liberal Party. Notably, in 2023, she voted against the successful motion to expel fellow conservative Liberal Moira Deeming from the Liberal parliamentary party. Prior to joining the Liberal Party, Hermans ran as the lead candidate in the South-East Metro region for the Family First Party at the 2006 Victorian state election but was unsuccessful.

In August 2025, Hermans compared former Premier Daniel Andrews to the Soviet dictator Joseph Stalin, saying: "The erosion of democratic principles in this state under the leadership of the former premier Daniel Andrews cannot go without comparisons to Joseph Stalin." Soon after, Hermans said she regretted comparing Andrews to Stalin but added: “I don’t take back the autocratic side [of my speech]. I think that is a fair description of Daniel Andrews’ leadership, and perhaps words could have been chosen a little bit different in terms of Stalin because obviously, we haven't had the sort of genocide [of the Stalin regime] and I wouldn't want that.” Hermans’ Liberal Party colleague, Georgie Crozier, criticised her comments, saying that they weren't appropriate, while the leader of the National Party, Danny O’Brien, called her comments "odious". Then Leader of the Victorian Liberal Party, Brad Battin, said he was "disappointed and very angry about what has happened,” referring to the comments made by Hermans, and fellow conservative MLC Moira Deeming, yet did not condemn the comments.

In March 2026, Hermans was relegated to the second position on the Liberal Party's ticket in the South-East for the 2026 Victorian state election.

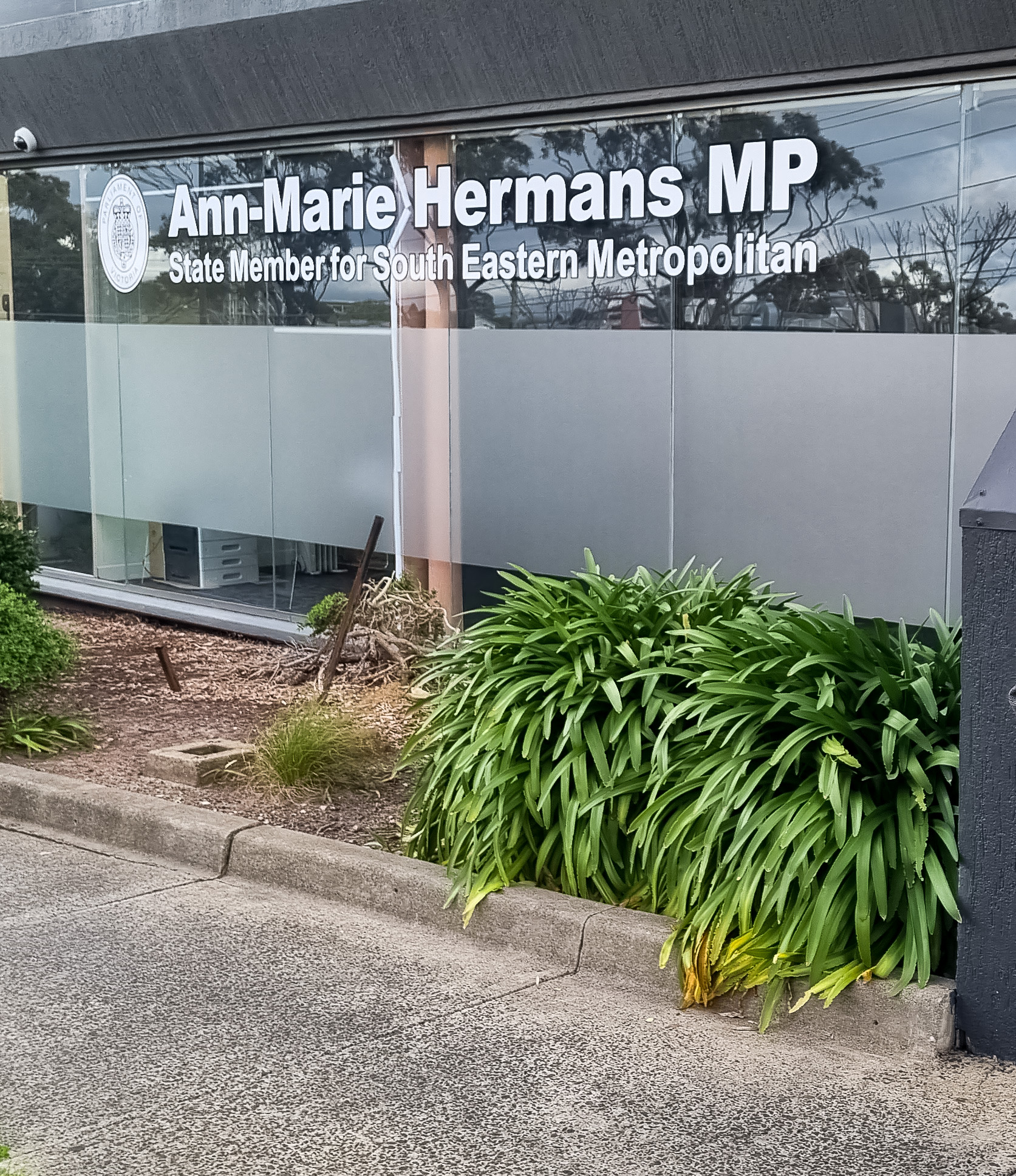
Hermans' Electoral Office, 2024
