= Michael Galea (politician) =

Australian politician

Michael Galea MLC

Member of the Victorian Legislative Council for South-Eastern Metropolitan Region
- Incumbent
- Assumed office 26 November 2022

Personal details
- Party: Labor

Michael Galea is an Australian politician. He has been a member of the Victorian Legislative Council since November 2022, representing the South-Eastern Metropolitan Region. He is a member of the Labor Party.
