= David Limbrick =

Australian politician

David Limbrick MLC
- Limbrick in 2026

Member of the Victorian Legislative Council for South-Eastern Metropolitan Region
- Incumbent
- Assumed office 22 June 2022
- In office 24 November 2018 – 11 April 2022

Leader of the Victorian Libertarian Party
- Incumbent
- Assumed office 26 November 2022
- Preceded by: No leader

Personal details
- Born: David Boyd Limbrick
- Party: Libertarian
- Website: davidlimbrick.com.au

David Boyd Limbrick is an Australian politician who currently serves as a Libertarian member of the Victorian Legislative Council, representing the South-Eastern Metropolitan Region. He was elected in 2018 but resigned his seat in April 2022 to unsuccessfully contest the federal election as a Senate candidate for his party. In June 2022, he returned to his seat, and was subsequently re-elected at the 2022 state election; since this point, he has also served as the party's Victorian leader.

== Political career ==
In 2018, Limbrick stood as a Liberal Democratic Party candidate in the South-Eastern Metropolitan Region of the Victorian Legislative Council. He was elected with 0.84% of first preference votes.

On 25 November 2021, Limbrick announced his intention to run for the Australian Senate at the 2022 federal election, and resigned from the Legislative Council on 11 April 2022.

On 22 June 2022, after failing to gain a Senate seat in the 2022 federal election, Limbrick was reappointed to the Legislative Council as a member for the South-Eastern Metropolitan Region, following a joint sitting of the Victorian Parliament to fill the vacancy caused by his own resignation.

On 16 August 2022, Limbrick was one of three who voted against the Treaty Authority and Other Treaty Elements Bill 2022.

He successfully ran for re-election at the November 2022 Victorian state election.

== Personal life ==
Natalie Russell, Limbrick's girlfriend during the 1990s, was a victim of the serial killer Paul Denyer.
