= 2006 Victorian state election =

Election in Victoria, Australia, in 2006

- 25 November 2006

All 88 seats in the Victorian Legislative Assembly All 40 seats in the Victorian Legislative Council 45 seats needed for a majority
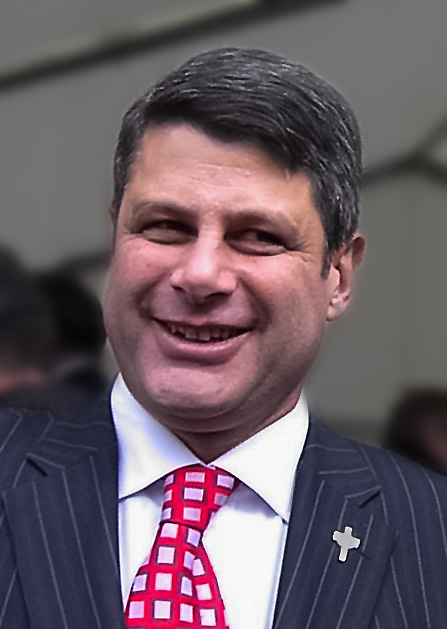

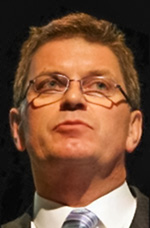

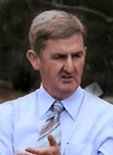
| | First party | Second party | Third party |
|---|---|---|---|
| Leader | Steve Bracks | Ted Baillieu | Peter Ryan |
| Party | Labor | Liberal | National |
| Leader since | 22 March 1999 | 8 May 2006 | 16 December 1999 |
| Leader's seat | Williamstown | Hawthorn | Gippsland South |
| Last election | 62 seats | 17 seats | 7 seats |
| Seats won | 55 seats | 23 seats | 9 seats |
| Seat change | ▼7 | ▲6 | ▲2 |
| Popular vote | 1,278,046 | 1,022,110 | 153,299 |
| Percentage | 43.06% | 34.44% | 5.17% |
| Swing | ▼4.89 | ▲0.53 | ▲0.87 |
| TPP | 54.39% | 45.61% |
| TPP swing | ▼3.38 | ▲3.38 |
- Results in each electorate.
Premier before election
Steve Bracks
Labor
Elected Premier
Steve Bracks
Labor

The 2006 Victorian state election, held on Saturday, 25 November 2006, was for the 56th Parliament of Victoria. Just over 3 million Victorians registered to vote elected 88 members to the Legislative Assembly and, for the first time, 40 members to the Legislative Council under a proportional representation system (Single transferable voting). The election was conducted by the independent Victorian Electoral Commission.

The Labor Party government of Premier Steve Bracks, first elected in 1999, won a third consecutive term with 55 of the 88 lower house seats, down seven from the 62 Labor won in 2002. The Liberal Party opposition of Ted Baillieu won 23 seats, and the National Party led by Peter Ryan won nine seats. One independent member was re-elected, while one lost his seat. Labor lost Bayswater, Evelyn, Ferntree Gully, Hastings, Kilsyth, Morwell and Narracan.

In the Legislative Council, Labor won 19 of the 40 seats, the Liberals 15, the Greens three, the Nationals two and the Democratic Labour Party one. This was the first time the DLP had won a seat in the Victorian Parliament since 1955.

Steve Bracks became only the second Labor Premier of Victoria to win three elections, and the first to win a third election with a large majority. Despite speculation that he would become the longest-serving Labor Premier in Victoria, he resigned in July 2007 and was replaced by his treasurer John Brumby.

As of 2026, this was the most recent elections where the Liberal and National parties contested the election not in a Coalition.

== Results ==
=== Legislative Assembly ===
| Party | Votes | % | +/– | Seats | +/– |
|---|---|---|---|---|---|
| Labor | 1,278,046 | 43.06 | ▼4.89 | 55 | ▼7 |
| Liberal | 1,022,110 | 34.44 | ▲0.53 | 23 | ▲6 |
| Greens | 297,931 | 10.04 | ▲0.31 | 0 | Steady |
| National | 153,299 | 5.17 | ▲0.87 | 9 | ▲2 |
| Family First | 127,266 | 4.29 | New | 0 | New |
| Independents | 67,826 | 2.29 | ▼1.11 | 1 | ▼1 |
| People Power | 15,226 | 0.51 | New | 0 | New |
| Citizens Electoral Council | 5,187 | 0.17 | ▼0.16 | 0 | Steady |
| Socialist Alliance | 1,102 | 0.04 | ▼0.07 | 0 | Steady |
| Total | 2,967,993 | 100.00 | – | 88 | – |
| Valid votes | 2,967,993 | 95.44 | | | |
| Invalid/blank votes | 141,914 | 4.56 | ▲1.14 | | |
| Total votes | 3,109,907 | 100.00 | – | | |
| Registered voters/turnout | 3,353,845 | 92.73 | ▼0.43 | | |
Two-party preferred
| Labor | 1,613,971 | 54.39 | ▼3.38 | | |
| Liberal/National | 1,353,319 | 45.61 | ▲3.38 | | |
| Total | 2,967,290 | 100.00 | – | | |

==== Maps ====
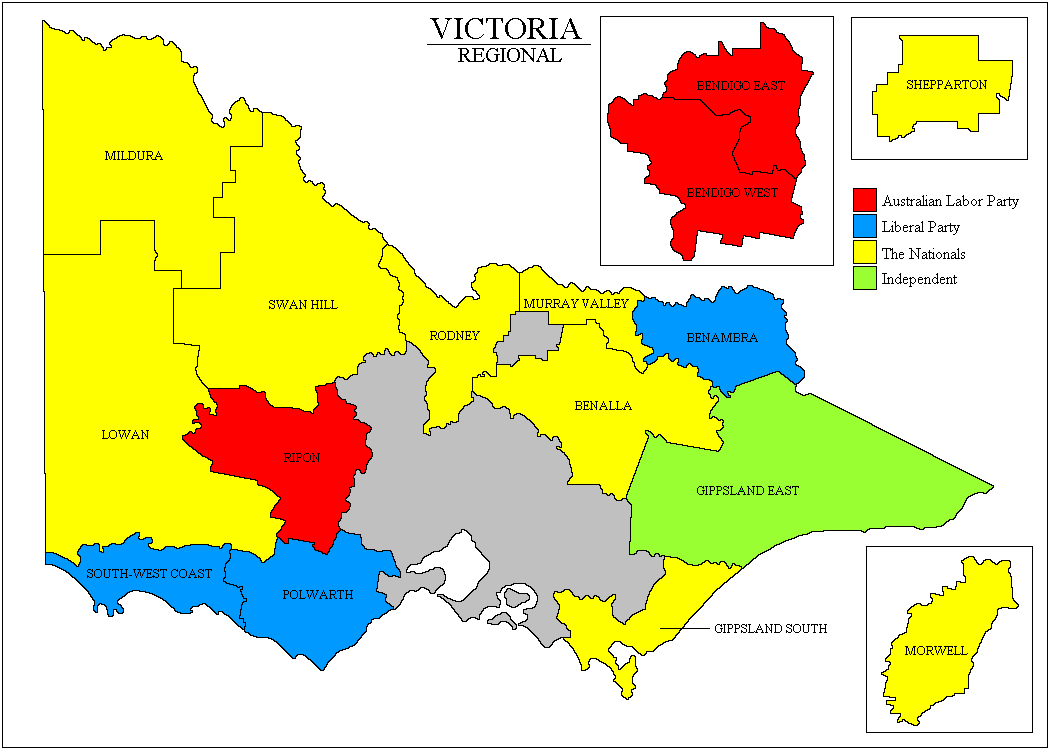

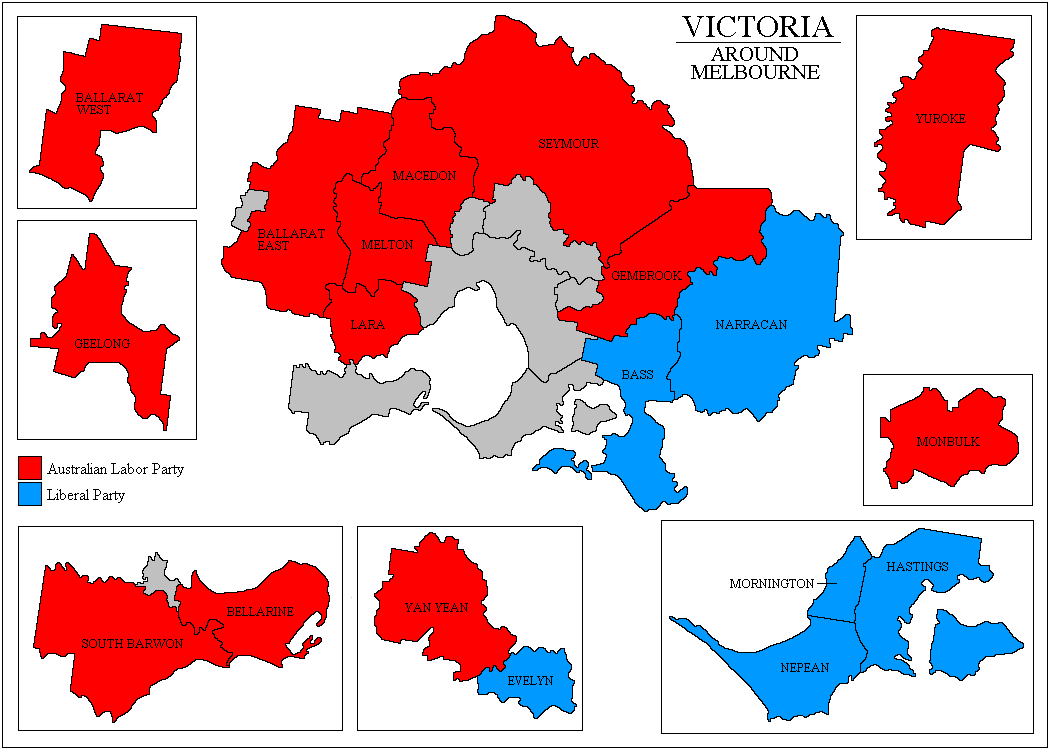

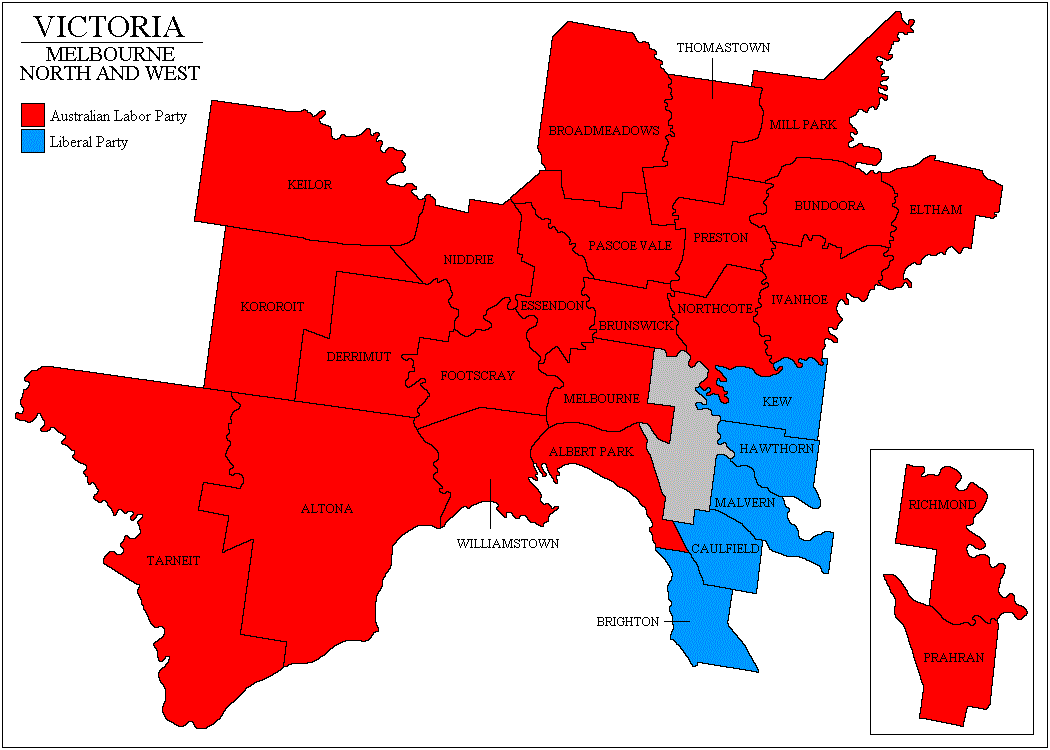

=== Legislative Council ===
| Party | Votes | % | +/– | Seats | +/– |
|---|---|---|---|---|---|
| Labor | 1,234,082 | 41.45 | ▼6.04 | 19 | ▼6 |
| Liberal | 1,028,421 | 34.55 | ▲0.04 | 15 | ▲1 |
| Greens | 314,847 | 10.58 | ▼0.29 | 3 | ▲3 |
| National | 131,946 | 4.43 | ▲0.06 | 2 | ▼3 |
| Family First | 114,739 | 3.85 | New | 0 | New |
| Democratic Labour | 58,722 | 1.97 | ▲1.97 | 1 | ▲1 |
| People Power | 30,433 | 1.02 | New | 0 | New |
| Democrats | 24,673 | 0.83 | ▼0.96 | 0 | Steady |
| Independents | 18,788 | 0.63 | ▼0.04 | 0 | Steady |
| Country Alliance | 13,329 | 0.45 | New | 0 | New |
| Christian Democrats | 5,819 | 0.20 | ▲0.06 | 0 | Steady |
| Socialist Alliance | 1,130 | 0.04 | ▼0.07 | 0 | Steady |
| Total | 2,976,929 | 100.00 | – | 40 | – |
| Valid votes | 2,976,929 | 95.72 | | | |
| Invalid/blank votes | 133,243 | 4.28 | ▲0.61 | | |
| Total votes | 3,110,172 | 100.00 | – | | |
| Registered voters/turnout | 3,353,845 | 92.73 | ▼0.39 | | |

Legislative Council seats

| Legislative Council Region | Seats held |
|---|---|
| Eastern Metropolitan Region | |
| Eastern Victoria Region | |
| Northern Metropolitan Region | |
| Northern Victoria Region | |
| South Eastern Metropolitan Region | |
| Southern Metropolitan Region | |
| Western Metropolitan Region | |
| Western Victoria Region | |

| Labor |
| Liberal |
| National |
| Green |
| Democratic Labor |

== Seats changing hands ==
| Seat | Pre-2006 | | | Swing | Post-2006 | | |
| Seat | Party | Member | Margin | Swing | Margin | Member | Party |
| Bayswater | Labor | Peter Lockwood | 2.7 | 5.4 | 2.7 | Heidi Victoria | Liberal |
| Evelyn | Labor | Heather McTaggart | 0.3 | 3.1 | 2.8 | Christine Fyffe | Liberal |
| Ferntree Gully | Labor | Anne Eckstein | 2.2 | 2.3 | 0.1 | Nick Wakeling | Liberal |
| Hastings | Labor | Rosy Buchanan | 0.9 | 1.9 | 1.0 | Neale Burgess | Liberal |
| Kilsyth | Labor | Dympna Beard | 2.1 | 2.4 | 0.3 | David Hodgett | Liberal |
| Mildura | Independent | Russell Savage | 18.4 | 24.3 | 5.9 | Peter Crisp | National |
| Morwell | Labor | Brendan Jenkins | 4.9* | 52.4 | 2.4 | Russell Northe | National |
| Narracan | Labor | Ian Maxfield | 6.8 | 10.3 | 3.5 | Gary Blackwood | Liberal |

- * Morwell's first margin figure is Labor vs. Liberal.

== Key dates ==
Terms are now fixed at four years. Key dates for the election were:

- 31 October: Dissolution of Parliament and writs for the election lodged
- 7 November: Close of rolls, voters had until 8 pm to enrol to vote.
- 9 November: Close of nominations for party candidates
- 10 November: Close of nominations for independents
- 25 November: Election day

The polls were open from 8 am to 6 pm, and results began to posted at about 7pm. By the close of counting at about 11 pm, the result in most Legislative Assembly seats was clear. Counting in the new Legislative Council regions, which have enrolments of over 300,000 voters, was in its early stages and the results were not clear at the close of counting.

== Background ==
2002 composition of the Parliament of Victoria
| Political Party | Legislative Assembly | Legislative Council |
|---|---|---|
| Labor | 62 | 24 |
| Liberal | 17 | 14 |
| National | 7 | 4 |
| Independent | 2 | 2 |
Source: Victorian Electoral Commission

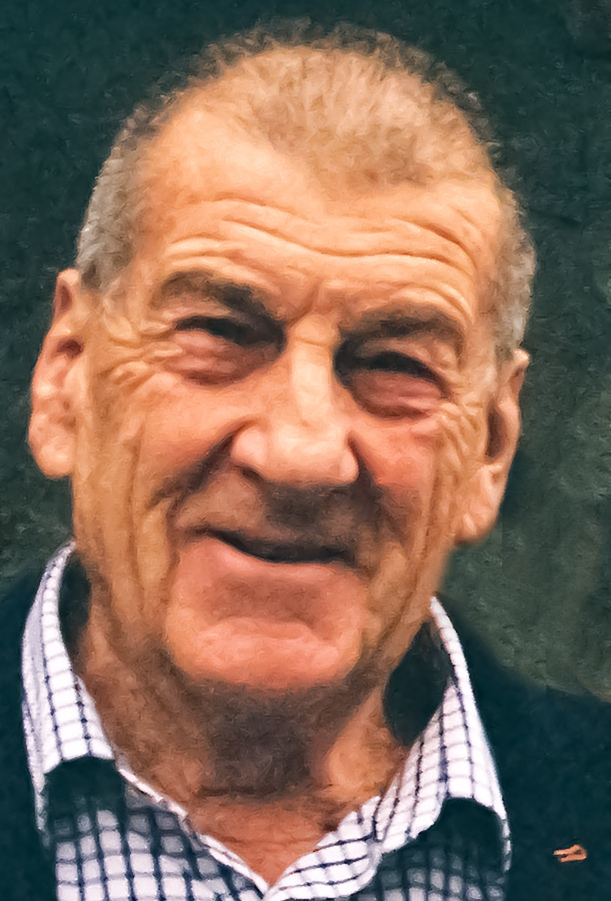
Former Victorian Premier Jeff Kennett was rumoured to be returning to politics in 2006

The Parliament of Victoria consists of the lower house Legislative Assembly, the upper house Legislative Council and the Queen of Australia. Eighty-eight members of the Legislative Assembly are elected to four-year terms from single-member electorates. After this election the new Legislative Council consisted of 40 members—the five members for each of the eight new regions were elected via proportional representation for four year terms.

For decades, lower house districts covering metropolitan Melbourne have always been won by either ALP or Liberal candidates. At the 2002 election, however, the Victorian Greens emerged ahead of the Liberals to challenge Labor for inner-city seats such as Melbourne, Richmond, Brunswick and Northcote. The ALP was strongest, and arguably unchallenged, in most seats north and west of the Yarra River—Melbourne's traditional cultural divide.

In fact, the Liberals had not held a metropolitan seat in the western suburbs since 1996, when they lost the seat of Essendon. At the 1996 election, the Liberals also lost Ivanhoe (their remaining seat north of the Yarra—Eltham—was lost in 2002). After the 2002 election landslide, the ALP held every Melbourne seat except for a thin band of strong Liberal seats in the eastern suburbs. To win government, the Liberals needed to win back their traditional heartland seats in eastern and south-east Melbourne.

For the Liberals and Nationals to win government with a majority of lower house seats, they needed a uniform swing of nearly 8 per cent to gain 20 seats, which would result in them almost doubling their numbers.

The ALP's success in 1999 and 2002 was partly due to its success in regional Victoria. To hold onto power, the ALP sought to retain seats outside Melbourne, and to hold its eastern suburban gains in 2002.

The Liberals aimed to win back urban fringe seats in eastern Melbourne, such as Gembrook, Hastings and Evelyn, and retain their marginal seats.

The Nationals had suffered heavily in recent years from the abolition of country seats they easily won, the rise of independents in Mildura and Gippsland East and direct competition from the Liberals. They aimed to hold on to their seven rural seats and also get members elected to the new upper house.

Under the new structure of the Legislative Council, the number of members dropped from 44 to 40 after this election. This introduced considerable competition within all parties for preselection for Legislative Council seats. The switch from provinces electing one member at a time to regions electing five members also meant that the major parties were more likely to lose seats to smaller parties such as the Greens. The balance in the 2002-2006 Legislative Council was ALP 24, Liberals 14, Nationals 4 and 2 independents (both of whom were former ALP members).

=== State of the parties ===
With a huge majority in the lower house, the Bracks Labor government was expected to be re-elected.

The Nationals leader Peter Ryan had terminated the Coalition agreement in mid-2000 after losing Benalla, when it became apparent that the minority Bracks Government would serve out its term. This allowed the Nationals to maintain a distinct profile from the Liberals over the succeeding years, demonstrated during the 2002 Labor landslide when the Nationals won back Benalla.

Tensions emerged between the conservative parties over issues such as the Liberal policy of halving tolls on the EastLink freeway. Peter Ryan stated that his party did not back the policy, because it would mean public money was spent on motorists in Melbourne's eastern suburbs, at the expense of services for country Victorians.

The Nationals also took offence at then Liberal leader Robert Doyle's repeated statement that the Liberals only needed 20 seats to win government, a figure which implied the support of the Nationals.

During March 2006, Phil Honeywood, the Deputy Opposition Leader, then Victor Perton both announced they would not contest the next election. This contributed to ongoing speculation about Robert Doyle's leadership, during which Ted Baillieu emerged as a possible challenger. Tensions between the Liberal factions were temporarily resolved with the appointment of Louise Asher as deputy opposition leader, with Doyle retaining the leadership unchallenged.

Robert Doyle's media director Rob Clancy's resignation became public on 26 April 2006, two weeks after his chief of staff Ron Wilson left for a job in the private sector. The Liberal Party state president Helen Kroger is another Doyle supporter who moved on. This string of resignations raised questions about the strength of Doyle's team in the lead up to the election. In response, Doyle denied that people were leaving because they did not think the party could win the election and that the resignations did not reflect well on the Liberals.

Strong rumours of an imminent "forced resignation" and Doyle "losing the support of the party" were aired on the front page of Melbourne's Herald Sun newspaper on 4 May 2006. Doyle did indeed resign as both Opposition Leader and MP for Malvern that day, although he stated that the "decision was his own" and that "his best was not enough to lead the party to victory in a state election just six months away".

On 5 May 2006, it became clear that Ted Baillieu would become Opposition and Liberal Party Leader after former Victorian Premier Jeff Kennett and Shadow Minister for Transport Terry Mulder both withdrew from the leadership race. Baillieu was subsequently elected unopposed on 8 May 2006. Kennett was rumoured to return to Parliament after stating he needed two days to decide.

With declining voter support over the last two Victorian state elections the Nationals almost lost Third Party status in the 2002 state election. They entered the 2006 election with 11 seats (7 in the Legislative Assembly and 4 in the Legislative Council), the minimum required to for official party status. Several of their Assembly seats were marginal, particularly Shepparton (4.27 percent) and Benalla (1.97 percent).

Several commentators predicted that the Nationals would face destruction at this election. The changes to the Legislative Council created large country regions which would negate the personal appeal of several candidates. Upper house member Bill Baxter became the candidate for the lower house electorate of Benambra in an attempt to remain in Parliament.

In the absence of a Liberal/National coalition, preference deals between Labor and the Liberals looked set to crush Nationals representation in the Assembly as well. Leader Peter Ryan gave what one commentator called "the speech of the campaign thus far" on 16 November, when he lambasted the major parties for their (perceived) action against the Nationals. The party went on to win an additional two seats.

The Greens' Greg Barber, former City of Yarra mayor, won the fourth seat in the upper house region of Northern Metropolitan, where the Greens were considered most likely to win their first seat in the Victorian Parliament. Sue Pennicuik, previously co-convener of the state party, also won the fourth upper house seat Southern Metropolitan region. Colleen Hartland won an upper house seat as well, the fifth seat in the Western Metropolitan Region. Bill Pemberton was preselected as the lead upper house candidate in the Eastern Metropolitan Region but was not elected.

In the lower house, Dr Richard Di Natale needed a 2.4 percent swing in the seat of Melbourne to unseat Labor's cabinet minister Bronwyn Pike, but wasn't successful in taking the seat from her, although he came quite close. Gurm Sekhon also wasn't successful in winning a seat, he needed a 3.1 percent swing in the seat of Richmond to unseat Labor's Richard Wynne.

The two current independent lower house MPs, Russell Savage (Mildura) and Craig Ingram (Gippsland East) had comfortable margins and were therefore considered highly likely to be re-elected. However, Russell Savage lost his seat to the Nationals, with the planned Nowingi toxic waste dump in the electorate cited as one of the main factors contributing to his defeat.

The fate of the two independent upper house MPs was less clear. Maverick Labor-turned-independent MLC Dianne Hadden attempted to shift to the lower house and run in Ballarat East against the incumbent Labor MP Geoff Howard, but no polling was carried out as to the potential result. Liberal-turned-independent Andrew Olexander attempted to retain his seat in the Legislative Council, having attempted to build a profile for himself after being expelled from the Liberal Party over disputes stemming from a drink driving conviction.

== Polling ==
Polling conducted by Newspoll and published in The Australian is performed via random telephone number selection in city and country areas. Sampling sizes usually consist of over 1000 electors, with the declared margin of error at ±3 percent.

Legislative Assembly (lower house) opinion polling
| | Primary vote | | | | | 2PP vote |
| | ALP | Lib | Nat | Grn | Oth | ALP | Lib |
|---|---|---|---|---|---|---|---|
| 8 – 9 Nov 2006 | 44% | 36% | 4% | 8% | 8% | 55% | 45% |
| Sep – Oct 2006 | 43% | 35% | 4% | 7% | 11% | 54% | 46% |
| Jul – Aug 2006 | 46% | 36% | 4% | 6% | 8% | 55% | 45% |
| May – Jun 2006 | 45% | 32% | 4% | 5% | 14% | 57% | 43% |
| Mar – Apr 2006 | 44% | 34% | 4% | 7% | 11% | 56% | 44% |
| Jan – Feb 2006 | 44% | 36% | 4% | 5% | 11% | 56% | 44% |
| Nov – Dec 2005 | 41% | 36% | 4% | 7% | 12% | 54% | 46% |
| Sep – Oct 2005 | 43% | 38% | 3% | 6% | 11% | 55% | 45% |
| Jul – Aug 2005 | 42% | 38% | 3% | 6% | 11% | 54% | 46% |
| May – Jun 2005 | 44% | 35% | 3% | 9% | 9% | 56% | 44% |
| 2002 election | 48.0% | 33.9% | 4.3% | 9.7% | 4.1% | 57.8% | 42.2% |
Source: Newspoll

Better Premier ratings^
| | Labor Bracks | Liberal Baillieu |
|---|---|---|
| 8 – 9 Nov 2006 | 56% | 28% |
| Sep – Oct 2006 | 51% | 25% |
| Jul – Aug 2006 | 50% | 25% |
| May – Jun 2006 | 49% | 24% |
| Mar – Apr 2006 | 60% | 15%* |
| Jan – Feb 2006 | 58% | 17%* |
| Nov – Dec 2005 | 55% | 19%* |
| Sep – Oct 2005 | 55% | 21%* |
| Jul – Aug 2005 | 51% | 22%* |
| May – Jun 2005 | 57% | 19%* |
Source: Newspoll * Results are for former Liberal leader Robert Doyle.^ Remainder were "uncommitted" to either leader.

== See also ==
- Candidates of the 2006 Victorian state election
