= Lee Tarlamis =

Australian politician

Lee Tarlamis OAM

Member of the Victorian Legislative Council for South-Eastern Metropolitan Region
- Incumbent
- Assumed office 23 April 2020
- In office 27 November 2010 – 29 November 2014

Personal details
- Born: 10 July 1975 (age 50) Malvern, Victoria, Australia
- Party: Labor Party

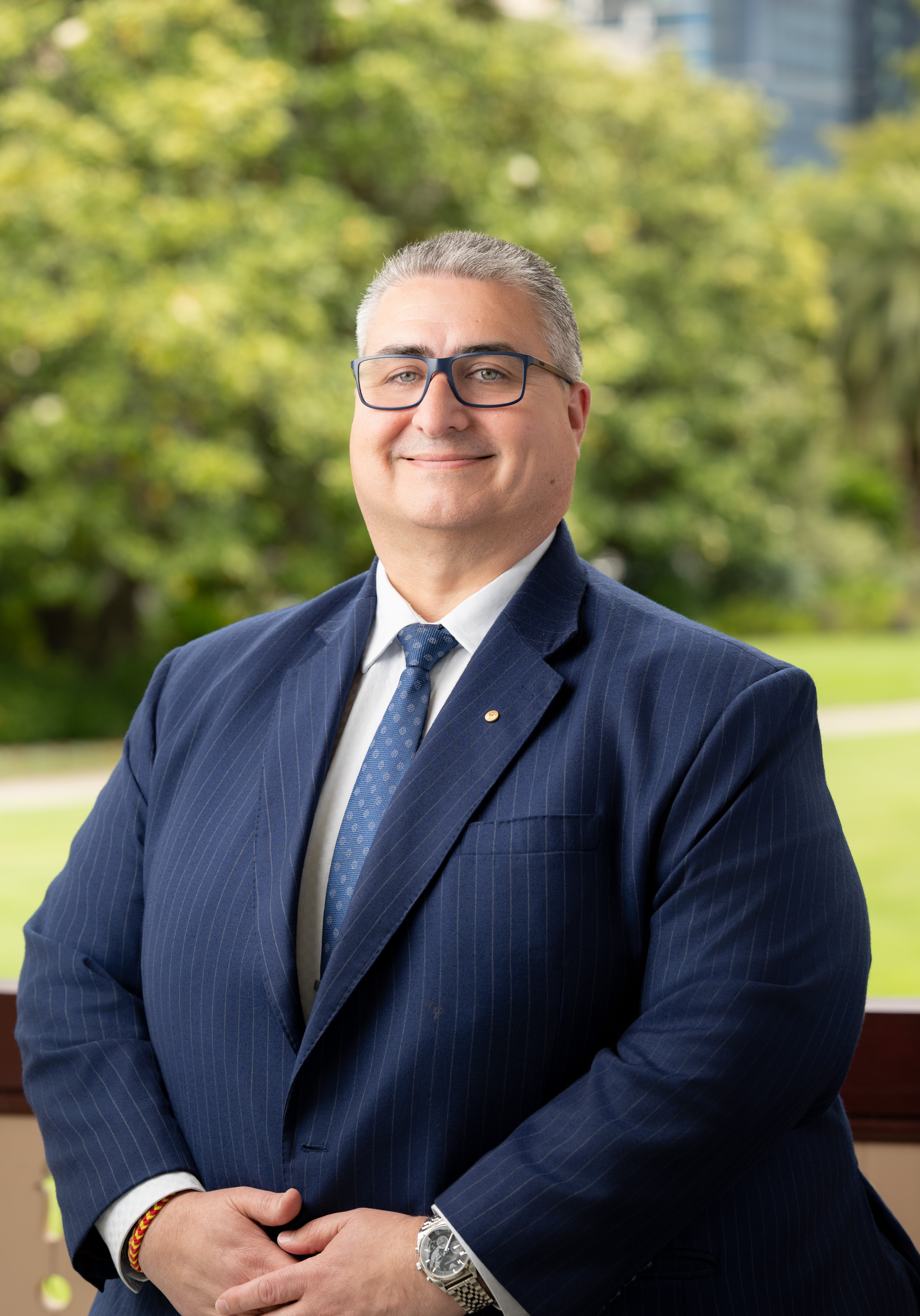
Lee Tarlamis in 2026.

Lee Reginald Tarlamis OAM (born 10 July 1975) is an Australian politician who has represented the South-Eastern Metropolitan Region for the Labor Party in the Victorian Legislative Council since 2020. He previously served from 2010 to 2014.

Tarlamis resides in Melbourne and is of Greek descent. His roots can be traced to the Greek island of Lemnos.

Following his defeat at the 2014 Victorian state election, he was appointed as a political adviser for the Andrews Ministry. In 2020 he returned to the Legislative Council, filling a vacancy caused by Gavin Jennings's resignation.
