= South-Eastern Metropolitan Region =

Electoral region of the Victorian Legislative Council

South-Eastern Metropolitan Region Victoria—Legislative Council
- Interactive map of electoral region boundaries from the 2022 state election, along with its composition of electoral districts
- State: Victoria
- Created: 2006
- MP: Michael Galea (Labor); Ann-Marie Hermans (Liberal); David Limbrick (Liberal Democrats); Rachel Payne (Legalise Cannabis); Lee Tarlamis (Labor)
- Party: Labor (2); Legalise Cannabis (1); Liberal (1); Libertarian (1)
- Electors: 555,544 (2022)
- Area: 658 km^{2} (254.1 sq mi)
- Demographic: Metropolitan
- Coordinates: 38°3′S 145°13′E

South-Eastern Metropolitan Region is one of the eight electoral regions of Victoria, Australia, which elects five members to the Victorian Legislative Council (also referred to as the upper house) by proportional representation. The region was created in 2006 following the 2005 reform of the Victorian Legislative Council.

The region covers the outer south eastern suburbs of Melbourne, and comprises the Legislative Assembly districts of Berwick, Carrum, Clarinda, Cranbourne, Dandenong, Frankston, Mordialloc, Mulgrave, Narre Warren North, Narre Warren South and Rowville.

== Members ==
Members for South Eastern Metropolitan Region
Year	Member	Party	Member	Party	Member	Party	Member	Party	Member	Party
2006	Gavin Jennings	Labor	Adem Somyurek	Labor	Bob Smith	Labor	Inga Peulich	Liberal	Gordon Rich-Phillips	Liberal
2010	Gavin Jennings	Labor	Adem Somyurek	Labor	Lee Tarlamis	Labor	Inga Peulich	Liberal	Gordon Rich-Phillips	Liberal
2014	Gavin Jennings	Labor	Adem Somyurek	Labor	Nina Springle	Greens	Inga Peulich	Liberal	Gordon Rich-Phillips	Liberal
2018	Gavin Jennings	Labor	Adem Somyurek	Labor	Tien Kieu	Labor	David Limbrick	Liberal Democrats / Libertarian	Gordon Rich-Phillips	Liberal
2020	Lee Tarlamis	Labor	Adem Somyurek	Independent	Tien Kieu	Labor	David Limbrick	Liberal Democrats / Libertarian	Gordon Rich-Phillips	Liberal
2022	Lee Tarlamis	Labor	Adem Somyurek	Democratic Labour	Tien Kieu	Labor	David Limbrick	Liberal Democrats / Libertarian	Gordon Rich-Phillips	Liberal
2022	Lee Tarlamis	Labor	Rachel Payne	Legalise Cannabis	Michael Galea	Labor	David Limbrick	Liberal Democrats / Libertarian	Ann-Marie Hermans	Liberal

== Returned MLCs by seat ==
Seats are allocated by single transferable vote using group voting tickets. Changes in party membership between elections have been omitted for simplicity.

Election	1st MLC	2nd MLC	3rd MLC	4th MLC	5th MLC
2006	Labor (Gavin Jennings)	Liberal (Gordon Rich-Phillips)	Labor (Adem Somyurek)	Liberal (Inga Peulich)	Labor (Bob Smith)
2010	Labor (Gavin Jennings)	Liberal (Gordon Rich-Phillips)	Labor (Adem Somyurek)	Liberal (Inga Peulich)	Labor (Lee Tarlamis)
2014	Labor (Gavin Jennings)	Liberal (Gordon Rich-Phillips)	Labor (Adem Somyurek)	Liberal (Inga Peulich)	Greens (Nina Springle)
2018	Labor (Gavin Jennings)	Labor (Adem Somyurek)	Liberal (Gordon Rich-Phillips)	Labor (Tien Kieu)	Liberal Democrats (David Limbrick)
2022	Labor (Lee Tarlamis)	Liberal (Ann-Marie Hermans)	Labor (Michael Galea)	Legalise Cannabis (Rachel Payne)	Liberal Democrats (David Limbrick)

== Election results ==
Labor were defending three seats. The Liberal Party and the Liberal Democrats were defending one seat each.

2022 Victorian state election: South-Eastern Metropolitan
Party	Candidate	Votes	%	±%
Quota		78,296		
Labor	1. Lee Tarlamis (elected 1) 2. Michael Galea (elected 3); 3. Tien Kieu; 4. Imran Khan; 5. Katrina Sullivan	184,810	39.34	−9.53
Liberal/National Coalition	1. Ann-Marie Hermans (elected 2); 2. Manju Hanumantharayappa; 3. Antonietta Moricca; 4. Lyndon Samuel; 5. Michael Keane	125,762	26.77	−2.80
Greens	1. Alex Breskin; 2. Louisa Willoughby; 3. Dewani Harahap; 4. Janet Wong; 5. Karen Jones	31,577	6.72	+1.20
Legalise Cannabis	1. Rachel Payne (elected 4) 2. Jeffrey Knipe	24,672	5.25	+5.25
Liberal Democrats	1. David Limbrick (elected 5) 2. Ethelyn King	16,971	3.61	+2.46
Democratic Labour	1. Jennifer Bowden; 2. Khalif White	15,399	3.28	+1.78
Justice	1. Derryn Hinch; 2. Mohit Dwivedi	9,334	1.99	−1.11
Family First	1. Lee Jones; 2. Colleen Hayward	9,025	1.92	+1.92
Freedom	1. Morgan Jonas; 2. Rebekah Spelman	8,306	1.77	+1.77
One Nation	1. Beth Stevens; 2. Cyndi Marr	8,299	1.77	+1.77
Animal Justice	1. Bronwyn Currie; 2. Davina Hinkley	6,481	1.38	−0.91
United Australia	1. Matt Babet; 2. Bobby Singh	5,495	1.17	+1.17
Sack Dan Andrews	1. Daniel Costin Puscasu; 2. Rodica Ianculescu	4,554	0.97	+0.97
Shooters, Fishers, Farmers	1. Grant Poulton; 2. Will Heily	4,112	0.88	−0.66
Health Australia	1. Geraldine Gonsalvez; 2. Kate Lukis	3,461	0.74	−0.11
Companions and Pets	1. Marissa Sarif; 2. Wendy Hutchison	2,425	0.52	+0.52
Reason	1. Martin Leahy; 2. Ethan Mileikowski	2,118	0.45	−0.37
Victorian Socialists	1. Lavanya Thavaraja; 2. Jaynaya Travis	1,895	0.40	+0.13
Sustainable Australia	1. Brandon Hoult; 2. Steven Armstrong	1,512	0.32	−0.36
Transport Matters	1. Norm Dunn; 2. Toni Peters	1,380	0.29	+0.94
Angry Victorians	1. Barry Edward Minster; 2. George Moliviatis	1,345	0.29	+0.29
New Democrats	1. Bhaveshkumar Lakhatariya; 2. Satinder Singh; 3. Nilam Dhaval Panchal; 4. Bhavika Amrutlal Patel	600	0.13	+0.13
Independent	1. Mehdi Sayed	242	0.05	+0.05
Total formal votes		469,775	96.29	+0.45
Informal votes		18,076	3.71	−0.45
Turnout		487,851	88.45	−1.32
