= Victorian Legislative Council =

Upper house of the Parliament of Victoria, Australia

Legislative Council
- 60th Parliament

Type
- Type: Upper house of the Parliament of Victoria

History
- Founded: 1851; 175 years ago

Leadership
- President: Shaun Leane, Labor since 20 December 2022
- Deputy President: Wendy Lovell, Liberal since 19 December 2018
- Leader of the Government: Jaclyn Symes, Labor since 23 March 2020
- Deputy Leader of the Government: Lizzie Blandthorn, Labor since 5 December 2022
- Leader of the Opposition: Bev McArthur, Liberal since 18 November 2025
- Deputy Leader of the Opposition: Evan Mulholland, Liberal since 31 August 2023
- Government Whip: Lee Tarlamis, Labor since August 2022

Structure
- Seats: 40
- Political groups: Government (15): Labor (15); Opposition (13): Liberal (11); National (2); Crossbench (12): Greens (4); Legalise Cannabis (2); Animal Justice (1); Libertarian (1); One Nation (1); Shooters, Fishers, Farmers (1); Family First (1); Independent (1)
- Length of term: 4 years

Elections
- Last general election: 26 November 2022
- Next general election: 28 November 2026

Meeting place
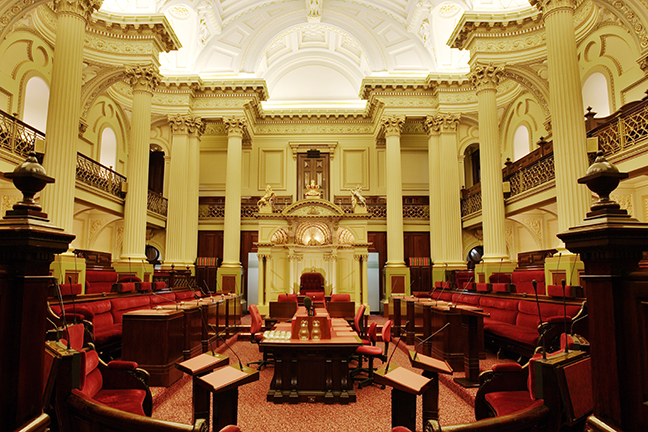
- Legislative Council Chamber, Parliament House, Melbourne, Victoria, Australia

Website
- Vic Legislative Council

The Victorian Legislative Council is the upper house of the bicameral Parliament of Victoria, Australia, the lower house being the Legislative Assembly. Both houses sit at Parliament House in Spring Street, Melbourne. The Legislative Council serves as a house of review, in a similar fashion to its federal counterpart, the Australian Senate. Although it is possible for legislation to be introduced in the Council, most bills receive their first reading in the Legislative Assembly.

The presiding officer of the chamber is the President of the Legislative Council. The Council presently comprises 40 members serving four-year terms from eight electoral regions each with five members. With each region electing five members using the single transferable vote, the quota in each region for election, after distribution of preferences, is 16.7% (one-sixth). Ballot papers for elections for the Legislative Council have above and below the line voting. Since the 2026 state election, voters have been required to vote for at least five parties above the line or at least five candidates below the line.

The chamber of the Legislative Council is noticeably red; all carpet and furnishings in the chamber are red, which is a symbol of royalty and nobility. This aesthetic is in line with the House of Lords in the United Kingdom.

== History ==
=== First Legislative Council ===
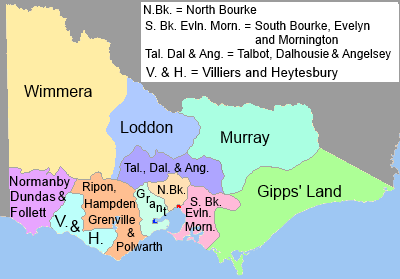
VLC electoral districts, 1851–1854

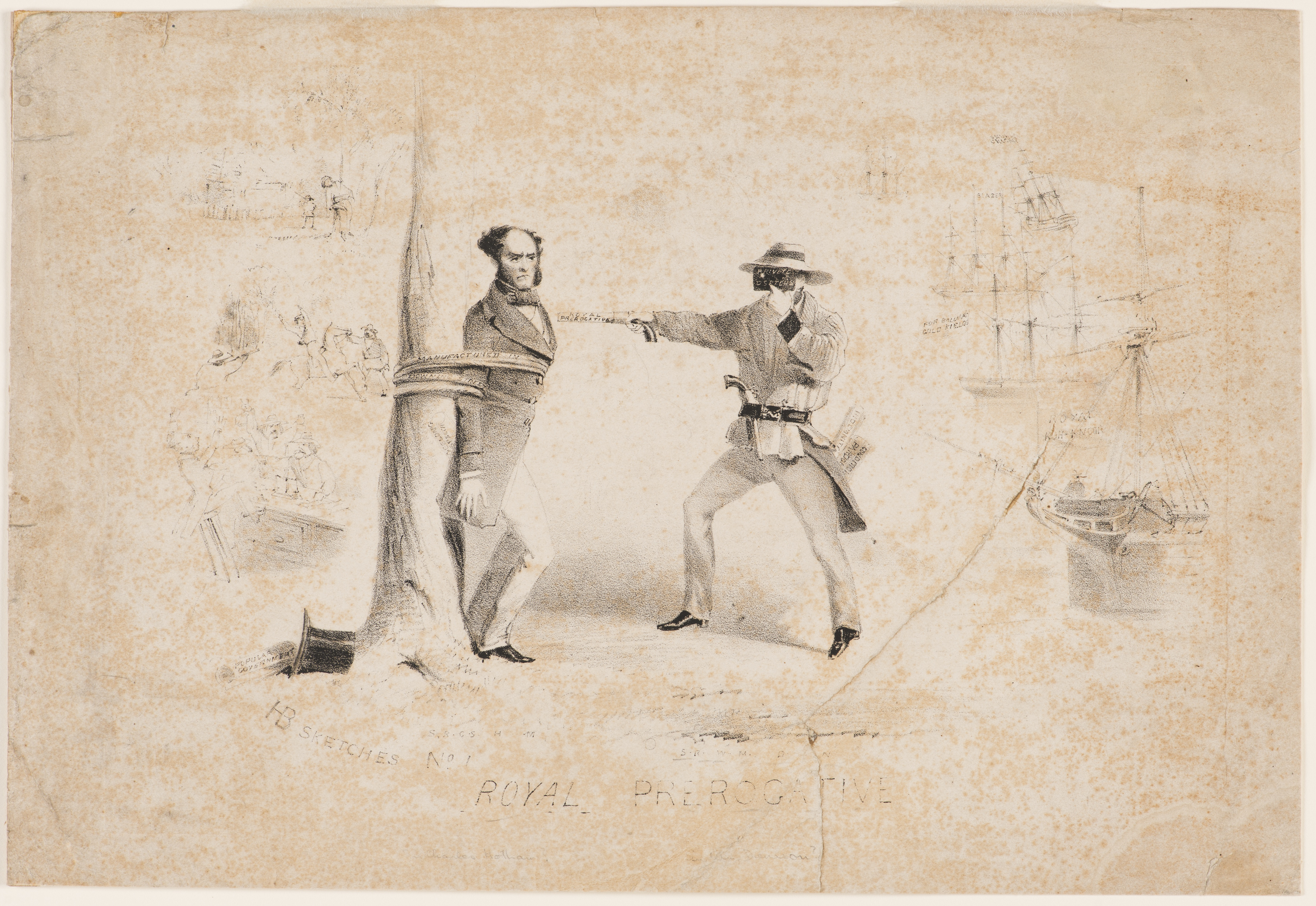
The Convicts' Protection Act, an act of the first legislative council, overriden by royal prerogative. The image depicts Sir Charles Hotham, bound with ropes 'manufactured in Downing Street', being threatened by Sir William Denison with a pistol marked 'Royal Prerogative'.

The separate colony of Victoria was proclaimed on 1 July 1851 and writs for the election of the first Legislative Council were issued at the same time for the 20 elected members.

The Legislative Council initially consisted of 30 members, 10 of whom were nominated by Lieutenant-Governor Charles La Trobe. The Argus called this provision a 'mockery of representation'.

The remaining 20 were elected from 16 "electoral districts", with Melbourne electing three members, and Geelong and the county of Bourke electing two members each. The electors were male British subjects over the age of 21 years, who owned freehold valued at £100 or a householder paying rent of £10 per year, both very large sums at the time. Members of the Legislative Council were unpaid, further restricting participation of those without independent means. It took some time before the Legislative Council was elected and ready to sit.

The Legislative Council met for the first time at noon on Tuesday 11 November 1851 at St Patrick's Hall, which had been built in 1847 in Bourke Street, Melbourne (since demolished). William Strutt made a watercolour sketch of the Opening which later published as a photolithograph.

The Legislative Council sat there until the opening of the Parliament House in 1856. James Frederick Palmer was the presiding officer of the Council, then called speaker.

The Legislative Council was expanded in 1853 to 18 nominees and 36 elected members. A further expansion of the Council occurred in 1855, when 8 new members were elected from five new electorates, with one new nominee.

The first Legislative Council existed for five years and was responsible for at least three significant and enduring contributions to the parliamentary system of Victoria:

- it drafted the Constitution of Victoria, which provides the framework for the system of government in Victoria;
- it introduced the secret ballot. The Victorian Electoral Act 1856 introduced secret ballots on 19 March 1856, an innovation at the time but now common around the world; and
- it ordered the construction of the Victorian Parliament House in Melbourne.

The new constitution was approved by the Legislative Council in March 1854 and was sent to Britain where it was passed by the United Kingdom Parliament as the Victoria Constitution Act 1855 (18 & 19 Vict. c. 55), received royal assent on 16 July 1855 and was proclaimed in Victoria on 23 November 1855. The Constitution established a Westminster-style system of responsible government that continues in Victoria today.

=== Second Legislative Council ===
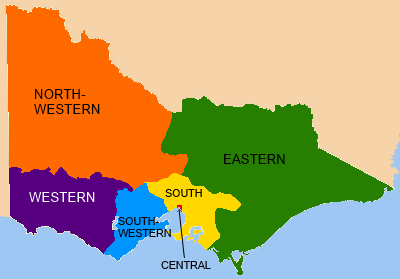
VLC electoral provinces, 1856–1882

The new Constitution came into effect in 1856. It created a bicameral Parliament of Victoria, with the Legislative Assembly being the lower house and the Council being the upper house. The Council consisted of 30 members, with five members being elected from each of the six provinces. The Parliament of Victoria first met on 21 November 1856 at the almost completed main sections of Parliament House. James Frederick Palmer was elected first President of the Council.

The Legislative Council was later elected from a varying number of provinces. In 1882, several new provinces were created while Central and Eastern were abolished. In 1904, more provinces were created and two members (MLCs) represented each province. The terms for members were two Assembly terms, and one member was elected in rotation at each election, by majority-preferential (AV) vote. Until 1950, the Legislative Council was elected on a restricted property-based franchise and always had a conservative majority.

Until 1958, elections for the Legislative Council were not held in conjunction with those for the Legislative Assembly, but starting at the 1961 election they have been held at the same time. Prior to the 2006 election, the Legislative Council consisted of 44 members elected for two terms of the Legislative Assembly from 22 two-member provinces. Half the members were elected at each election on a rotation basis. This old system tended to favour the Liberal Party and the National Party (often in Coalition) over the Labor Party and other parties; as the Liberal party's support was more evenly spread across the state, compared to Labor's wasted votes in already safe provinces. This resulted in many instances of a Labor government being faced with an opposition-controlled Council – a rare occurrence elsewhere in Australia.

=== 2003 reforms ===
The eight regions of the Legislative Council (2014–2022)

The eight regions of the Legislative Council (2022–)

The electoral system used to elect members of the Legislative Council changed for the 2006 Victorian election, as a result of major reforms passed by the Labor government, led by Steve Bracks, in 2003. Under the new system the State is divided into eight electoral regions, each of which returns five members. These Legislative Council members serve terms linked to the Legislative Assembly, which has fixed four-year terms unless earlier dissolved in exceptional circumstances.

Each electoral region covers 11 contiguous Legislative Assembly electoral districts and has 420,000 electors.

Five regions are metropolitan (Melbourne and environs) (North-Eastern Metropolitan, Northern Metropolitan, South Eastern Metropolitan, Southern Metropolitan, and Western Metropolitan) and three are non-urban regions (Eastern Victoria, Northern Victoria and Western Victoria).

Since 2006, Legislative Council members have been elected using the single transferable vote system of proportional representation. Each region elects five members. The quota for a seat in each region is 16.7% (one-sixth), approximately 70,000.

Small parties never receive this amount on the First Count in Victoria's Legislative Council elections but through the vote transfers that are part of STV, some candidates of small parties do receive vote transfers from other small-party candidates and pass quota that way. STV thus results in an increase in the number of minor parties represented in the Legislative Council as compared to the Instant-runoff voting system. Under Instant-runoff voting, in 2002 for example, the traditional big three – Labor, Liberal and National – took all the seats – Greens with 314,000 voters overall did not take one seat. In 2006 the Greens took almost exactly the same number of votes that it had in 2002 and this time won three seats, just slightly less than its 10 percent of the vote should have given it proportionally. The Democratic Labour Party also won a seat, the first one it had won in 50 years. STV was such that the success for those two parties was achieved while at the same time Labor, Liberal and National parties each still took a number of seats.

At the same time, the Council's ability to block supply was removed.

=== 2026 reforms ===
In the lead-up to the 2026 state election, several commentators noted that the Legislative Council was the last remaining parliamentary chamber in Australia to use group voting tickets (GVTs) to assign preferences of voters who, when voting above the line, could vote for only one party or group. The system had incentivised the practice of so-called 'preference harvesting', with organisers such as Glenn Druery arranging ideologically disparate microparties to direct their preferences to each other, allowing candidates to be elected despite receiving approximately 1% of the vote in some cases. GVTs had been abolished for the Australian Senate in 2016 and for the Western Australian Legislative Council in 2025. In August 2026, the parliament passed electoral reform legislation abolishing GVTs and allowing voters to vote for at least five parties or groups of their choice above the line, or at least five candidates of their choice below the line.

== Composition ==
Since the 2006 Victorian state election, the Legislative Council has had 40 members serving four-year terms, elected from eight electoral regions, each returning five members.

Prior to the 2006 election, the Legislative Council consisted of 44 members elected for two terms of the Legislative Assembly from 22 two-member provinces. Half the members were elected at each election on a rotation basis. The number of members was increased to 44 from 36 in 1976 and from 34 in 1967.

Property qualifications for voting in the Legislative Council were abolished for the 1952 Legislative Council election, increasing the number of eligible voters from 0.5 million in 1949 to 1.4 million in 1952, and resulting in a large increase in the number of Labor MLCs. However, Labor achieved a majority in the Council only at the 1985 and the 2002 elections.

=== Current members of the Victorian Legislative Council ===
Region	1st MLC	2nd MLC	3rd MLC	4th MLC	5th MLC
Northern Metropolitan	Sheena Watt (Labor)	Evan Mulholland (Liberal)	Samantha Ratnam (Greens)	Enver Erdogan (Labor)	Adem Somyurek (Democratic Labour/ Independent) (Note: Adem Somyurek resigned from the Democratic Labour Party in March 2024.)
Northern Metropolitan	Sheena Watt (Labor)	Evan Mulholland (Liberal)	Anasina Gray-Barberio (Note: Samantha Ratnam resigned from parliament on 8 November 2024 and was replaced by Anasina Gray-Barberio on 13 November 2024.) (Greens)	Enver Erdogan (Labor)	Adem Somyurek (Democratic Labour/ Independent)
Southern Metropolitan	David Davis (Liberal)	John Berger (Labor)	Georgie Crozier (Liberal)	Katherine Copsey (Greens)	Ryan Batchelor (Labor)
North-Eastern Metropolitan	Shaun Leane (Labor)	Matthew Bach (Liberal)	Sonja Terpstra (Labor)	Nick McGowan (Liberal)	Aiv Puglielli (Greens)
North-Eastern Metropolitan	Shaun Leane (Labor)	Richard Welch (Note: Matthew Bach resigned from parliament on 87 December 2023 and was replaced by Richard Welch on 7 February 2024.) (Liberal)	Sonja Terpstra (Labor)	Nick McGowan (Liberal)	Aiv Puglielli (Greens)
South-Eastern Metropolitan	Lee Tarlamis (Labor)	Ann-Marie Hermans (Liberal)	Michael Galea (Labor)	Rachel Payne (Legalise Cannabis)	David Limbrick (Liberal Democrats/ Libertarian) (Note: The Liberal Democratic Party changed its name to the Libertarian Party in 2023.)
Western Metropolitan	Lizzie Blandthorn (Labor)	Moira Deeming (Liberal/Ind. Liberal/Liberal/Independent/Family First) (Note: Moira Deeming was expelled from the parliamentary Victorian Liberal Party in May 2023 and sat as an Independent Liberal until returning to the party room in December 2024. Deeming subsequently resigned from the Liberal party in July 2026. In September 2026, she announced that she had joined Family First.)	Ingrid Stitt (Labor)	David Ettershank (Legalise Cannabis)	Trung Luu (Liberal)
Northern Victoria	Wendy Lovell (Liberal)	Jaclyn Symes (Labor)	Gaelle Broad (Nationals)	Georgie Purcell (Animal Justice)	Rikkie-Lee Tyrrell (One Nation)
Eastern Victoria	Renee Heath (Liberal)	Tom McIntosh (Labor)	Melina Bath (Nationals)	Harriet Shing (Labor)	Jeff Bourman (SFF)
Western Victoria	Jacinta Ermacora (Labor)	Bev McArthur (Liberal)	Gayle Tierney (Labor)	Sarah Mansfield (Greens)	Joe McCracken (Liberal)

=== Distribution of seats in the Legislative Council (2006–present) ===
Party	Seats				
Party	2006	2010	2014	2018	2022
Labor	19	16	14	18	15
Liberal	15	18	14	10	12
National	2	3	2	1	2
Greens	3	3	5	1	4
Legalise Cannabis	-	-	-	-	2
Libertarian	-	-	-	2	1
Animal Justice	-	-	-	1	1
Democratic Labour	1	-	1	-	1
Justice	-	-	-	3	-
One Nation	-	-	-	-	1
Reason	-	-	1	1	-
Shooters, Fishers and Farmers	-	-	2	1	1
Sustainable Australia	-	-	-	1	-
Transport Matters	-	-	-	1	-
Vote 1 Local Jobs	-	-	1	-	-
Total	40	40	40	40	40

== See also ==
- List of Victorian Legislative Council appointments
- 2018 Victorian state election
- 2022 Victorian state election
- Members of the Victorian Legislative Council, 2022–2026
- List of elections in Victoria
