= Electoral results for the Southern Metropolitan Region =

This is a list of electoral results for the Southern Metropolitan Region in Victorian state elections from the region's creation in 2006 until the present.

== Election results ==
=== Elections in the 2020s ===
==== 2022 ====
Labor and the Liberal Party were defending two seats each. Sustainable Australia was defending one seat.

2022 Victorian state election: Southern Metropolitan
Party	Candidate	Votes	%	±%
Quota		78,309		
Liberal/National Coalition	1. David Davis (elected 1); 2. Georgie Crozier (elected 3); 3. Nick Stavrou; 4. Andrew Litwinow; 5. Monica Clark	169,681	36.11	−1.78
Labor	1. John Berger (elected 2); 2. Ryan Batchelor (elected 5); 3. Clive Crosby; 4. Lynn Psaila; 5. Muhammad Shahbaz	139,722	29.74	−5.45
Greens	1. Katherine Copsey (elected 4); 2. John Friend-Pereira; 3. Anna Parker; 4. Kylie Rocha; 5. Shanae Rowick	72,410	15.41	+2.31
Legalise Cannabis	1. Marc Selan; 2. Ben Howman	13,681	2.91	+2.91
Liberal Democrats	1. Matthew Ford; 2. David Segal	11,696	2.49	+0.96
Democratic Labour	1. Theodore Tsoingas; 2. Dean Chambers	10,385	2.21	+0.02
Reason	1. Andrew Johnson; 2. Stephen Jasper	9,511	2.02	+0.07
Animal Justice	1. Ben Schultz; 2. Michelle McGoldrick	6,698	1.43	−0.72
Sustainable Australia	1. Clifford Hayes; 2. Allan Doensen	5,170	1.10	−0.19
Family First	1. Vickie Janson; 2. Alex Van Der End	4,734	1.01	+1.01
Justice	1. Ellie Jean Sullivan; 2. Michaele Dale	3,807	0.81	−0.67
Sack Dan Andrews	1. Nursin Akdogan; 2. Reyhan Adonir	3,542	0.75	+0.75
One Nation	1. Chris Bradbury; 2. Craig Pickering	3,072	0.65	+0.65
Freedom	1. Natasha Kons; 2. Madeleine Kons	2,810	0.60	+0.60
Victorian Socialists	1. Jack Todaro; 2. Liam Kruger	2,516	0.54	+0.07
United Australia	1. Leon Kofmansky; 2. Julie McCamish	2,177	0.46	+0.46
Shooters, Fishers, Farmers	1. Nicole Bourman; 2. Michelle Collyer	1,966	0.42	−0.22
Health Australia	1. Kellie Thomas; 2. Mark Lambrick	1,935	0.41	−0.07
Transport Matters	1. Paul Tammesild; 2. Marc Peters	1,480	0.31	−0.04
Companions and Pets	1. Joan Molyneux; 2. Max Winch	1,257	0.27	+0.27
Angry Victorians	1. Dean Hurlston; 2. Robert John Kamp	915	0.19	+0.19
New Democrats	1. Krishna Dharmeshkumar Brahmbhatt; 2. Jigarkumar Ahbaysinh Chaudhary; 3. Ravinder Singh Marwaha	688	0.15	+0.15
Total formal votes		469,853	97.98	+0.45
Informal votes		9,702	2.02	−0.45
Turnout		479,555	88.45	−0.88

=== Elections in the 2010s ===
==== 2018 ====
The Liberals were defending three seats, and Labor and the Greens were defending one each.

2018 Victorian state election: Southern Metropolitan
Party	Candidate	Votes	%	±%
Quota		71,610		
Liberal	1. David Davis (elected 1); 2. Georgie Crozier (elected 3); 3. Margaret Fitzherbert; 4. Gavan MacRides; 5. Miaosheng Yang	164,607	38.29	−4.43
Labor	1. Philip Dalidakis (elected 2); 2. Nina Taylor (elected 4); 3. Judith Armstrong; 4. Graeme Kendall; 5. Danny Bellote	148,656	34.58	+9.38
Greens	1. Sue Pennicuik; 2. Earl James; 3. Rose Read; 4. Duncan Forster; 5. James Bennett	57,849	13.46	−2.08
Animal Justice	1. Ben Schultz; 2. Fiona McRostie	9,315	2.17	+0.52
Reason	1. Jill Mellon-Robertson; 2. Edmund Munday	8,587	2.00	−0.43
Justice	1. Nikki Nicholls; 2. Julie Doidge	6,178	1.44	+1.44
Liberal Democrats	1. Robert Kennedy; 2. Kirsty O'Sullivan	5,940	1.38	−3.23
Sustainable Australia	1. Clifford Hayes (elected 5); 2. Cathryn Houghton	5,695	1.32	+1.32
Democratic Labour	1. Joel van der Horst; 2. Lucia De Summa	5,684	1.32	−0.85
Voluntary Euthanasia	1. Jane Morris; 2. Imelda Ryan	4,364	1.02	+0.23
Shooters, Fishers, Farmers	1. Nicole Bourman; 2. Ryan Lindfors-Beswick	2,726	0.63	+0.16
Liberty Alliance	1. Avi Yemini; 2. Kaylah Jones	2,096	0.49	+0.49
Health Australia	1. Ben Moore; 2. Cindy Cerecer	2,055	0.48	+0.48
Victorian Socialists	1. Catheryn Lewis; 2. Ivan Mitchell	2,046	0.48	+0.48
Aussie Battler	1. Mark Hillard; 2. Stacey Wain	1,700	0.40	+0.40
Transport Matters	1. Kim Guest; 2. Saeed Muhammad	1,375	0.32	+0.32
Country	1. Nicola Clow; 2. Michele Armstrong	711	0.17	+0.08
Hudson for Northern Victoria	1. Matthew Perriam; 2. Grace Perriam	342	0.08	+0.08
Total formal votes		429,657	97.33	−0.10
Informal votes		11,801	2.67	+0.10
Turnout		441458	89.31	−2.56

==== 2014 ====
2014 Victorian state election: Southern Metropolitan
Party	Candidate	Votes	%	±%
Quota		69,033		
Liberal	1. David Davis (elected 1); 2. Georgie Crozier (elected 3); 3. Margaret Fitzherbert (elected 5); 4. Ken Ong; 5. Nellie Khoroshina	176,945	42.72	−8.86
Labor	1. Philip Dalidakis (elected 2); 2. Erik Locke; 3. Raff Ciccone; 4. Cassandra Devine; 5. Will Fowles	104,365	25.20	−0.14
Greens	1. Sue Pennicuik (elected 4); 2. James Searle; 3. Rose Read; 4. Lorna Wyatt; 5. James Harrison	64,364	15.54	−0.78
Liberal Democrats	1. Craig Bonsor; 2. Michelle Hamilton	19,075	4.61	+4.61
Sex Party	1. Francesca Collins; 2. Darren Austin	10,062	2.43	−0.69
Democratic Labour	1. Vince Stefano; 2. Brendan Prendergast	8,971	2.17	+0.36
Animal Justice	1. Nyree Walshe; 2. Fiona McRostie	6,829	1.65	+1.65
Cyclists	1. Richard Bowen; 2. Kathryn Siddle; 3. Marcus Barber	4,749	1.15	+1.15
Palmer United	1. Dwayne Singleton; 2. Anthony Cresswell; 3. Scott Rankin	3,753	0.91	+0.91
Voluntary Euthanasia	1. Penny McCasker; 2. Fiona Stewart	3,271	0.79	+0.79
Christians	1. Faliana Lee; 2. Ian Dobby	2,854	0.69	+0.69
Family First	1. Shane Clark; 2. Gary Coombes	2,708	0.65	−0.33
Shooters and Fishers	1. Paul William; 2. Steven Zoumis	1,933	0.47	+0.47
People Power Victoria	1. Kenneth Miller; 2. Linda Jones	1,138	0.27	+0.27
Rise Up Australia	1. Peter Vassiliou; 2. Glenda Powell	1,045	0.25	+0.25
Democrats	1. Clive Jackson; 2. Richard Grummet	801	0.19	+0.19
Group R	1. Luzio Grossi; 2. Crystal James	797	0.19	+0.19
Country Alliance	1. Christopher Morris; 2. Andrew Driscoll	361	0.09	+0.09
Independent	George Neophytou	175	0.04	+0.04
Total formal votes		414,196	97.43	
Informal votes		10,912	2.57	
Turnout		425,108	91.87	

==== 2010 ====
2010 Victorian state election: Southern Metropolitan
Party	Candidate	Votes	%	±%
Quota		63,562		
Liberal	1. David Davis (elected 1); 2. Andrea Coote (elected 3); 3. Georgie Crozier (elected 4); 4. Jane Hume; 5. Adam Held	196,676	51.6	+5.4
Labor	1. John Lenders (elected 2); 2. Jennifer Huppert; 3. Zoe Edwards; 4. Pablo Salina; 5. Michael Suss	96,404	25.3	−5.9
Greens	1. Sue Pennicuik (elected 5); 2. Neil Pilling; 3. Clare Pilcher; 4. Bruce McPhate; 5. Des Benson	62,285	16.3	+0.6
Sex Party	1. Ken Hill; 2. Danyel Payne	12,364	3.2	+3.2
Democratic Labor	1. Michael Murphy; 2. Brendan Prendergast	6,849	1.8	+0.6
Family First	1. Ashley Trüter; 2. Joyce Khoo	3,620	0.9	−1.3
Christian Democrats	1. Mansel Rogerson; 2. Ray Levick	1,726	0.5	+0.5
Group E	1. Vern Hughes; 2. Suzette Gallagher	1,229	0.3	+0.3
Independent	Mike Cockburn	216	0.1	+0.1
Total formal votes		381,369	97.4	+0.5
Informal votes		10,071	2.6	−0.5
Turnout		391,440	91.7	+1.5

=== Elections in the 2000s ===
==== 2006 ====
2006 Victorian state election: Southern Metropolitan
Party	Candidate	Votes	%	±%
Quota		60,301		
Liberal	1. David Davis (elected 1); 2. Andrea Coote (elected 3); 3. David Southwick; 4. Michael Heffernan; 5. Kaye Farrow	167,202	46.2	+2.1
Labor	1. John Lenders (elected 2); 2. Evan Thornley (elected 5); 3. Shelly Freeman; 4. Alexandria Hicks; 5. Pablo Salina	112,762	31.2	−6.7
Greens	1. Sue Pennicuik (elected 4); 2. Heather Welsh; 3. Ray Walford; 4. Clare Pilcher; 5. Teresa Puszka	56,816	15.7	+0.3
Family First	1. John McSwiney; 2. John Friebel; 3. Brian Campbell	7,894	2.2	+2.2
Democrats	1. Paul Kavanagh; 2. Margaret Mitsikas; 3. John Mathieson	6,219	1.7	−0.4
People Power	1. Stephen Mayne; 2. Judith Voce	4,952	1.4	+1.4
Democratic Labor	1. Gerry Flood; 2. Brian Maunder; 3. Terry O'Hanlon	4,206	1.2	+1.2
Group C	1. Rita Bentley; 2. Geoff Taylor	1,439	0.4	+0.4
Independent	John Myers	315	0.1	+0.1
Total formal votes		361,805	96.9	+0.1
Informal votes		11,420	3.1	−0.1
Turnout		373,225	90.2	
