= Electoral results for the Monash Province =

Victoria, Australia, district election results

This is a list of electoral results for the Monash Province in Victorian state elections.

== Members for Monash Province ==
Member 1	Party	Year		
Frank Clarke	United Australia	1937	Member 2	Party
Frank Clarke	United Australia	1940	Archibald Crofts	United Australia
Frank Clarke	United Australia	1942	Frank Beaurepaire^{[r]}	United Australia
Frank Clarke	United Australia	1943	Frank Beaurepaire^{[r]}	United Australia
Frank Clarke	United Australia	1943	Frank Beaurepaire	United Australia
Frank Clarke	Liberal	1945	Frank Beaurepaire	Liberal
Frank Clarke	Liberal	1946	Frank Beaurepaire	Liberal
Frank Clarke	Liberal and Country	1949	Frank Beaurepaire	Liberal and Country
Frank Clarke	Liberal and Country	1949	Frank Beaurepaire	Liberal and Country
Frank Clarke	Liberal and Country	1952	Thomas Brennan	Labor
Frank Clarke	Liberal and Country	1955	Thomas Brennan	Labor (A-C)
Charles Gawith	Liberal and Country	1955	Thomas Brennan	Labor (A-C)
Charles Gawith	Liberal and Country	1955	Thomas Brennan	Labor (A-C)
Charles Gawith	Liberal and Country	1958	Graham Nicol	Liberal and Country
Charles Gawith	Liberal and Country	1961	Graham Nicol	Liberal and Country
Charles Gawith	Liberal and Country	1964	Graham Nicol	Liberal and Country
Charles Gawith	Liberal	1965	Graham Nicol	Liberal
Lindsay Thompson	Liberal	1967	Graham Nicol	Liberal
Lindsay Thompson	Liberal	1970	Graham Nicol	Liberal
Charles Hider	Liberal	1970	Graham Nicol	Liberal
Charles Hider	Liberal	1973	Graham Nicol	Liberal
Charles Hider	Liberal	1976	James Guest	Liberal
Don Hayward	Liberal	1979	James Guest	Liberal
Don Hayward	Liberal	1982	James Guest	Liberal
Reg Macey	Liberal	1985	James Guest	Liberal
Reg Macey	Liberal	1988	James Guest	Liberal
Louise Asher	Liberal	1992	James Guest	Liberal
Louise Asher	Liberal	1996	Peter Katsambanis	Liberal
Andrea Coote	Liberal	1999	Peter Katsambanis	Liberal
Andrea Coote	Liberal	2002	Johan Scheffer	Labor

^{[r]} Beaurepaire resigned in August 1943, re-elected in October 1943

== Election results ==
=== Elections in the 2000s ===
2002 Victorian state election: Monash Province
Party	Candidate	Votes	%	±%
Liberal	Peter Katsambanis	55,855	43.5	−8.1
Labor	Johan Scheffer	46,697	36.3	−1.2
Greens	Jo Lewis	23,154	18.0	+18.0
Democrats	David Zemdegs	2,795	2.2	−5.3
Total formal votes		128,501	97.0	+0.2
Informal votes		4,015	3.0	−0.2
Turnout		132,516	89.2	
Two-party-preferred result
Labor	Johan Scheffer	66,740	51.9	+7.5
Liberal	Peter Katsambanis	61,761	48.1	−7.5
Labor gain from Liberal		Swing	+7.5	

=== Elections in the 1990s ===
1999 Victorian state election: Monash Province
Party	Candidate	Votes	%	±%
Liberal	Andrea Coote	62,295	51.2	−0.5
Labor	Jacki Willox	45,926	37.8	−0.7
Democrats	Julie Peters	9,211	7.6	+1.0
Independent	Roberto D'Andrea	4,165	3.4	+3.4
Total formal votes		121,597	96.8	−0.8
Informal votes		4,009	3.2	+0.8
Turnout		125,606	82.6	
Two-party-preferred result
Liberal	Andrea Coote	67,158	55.3	+0.5
Labor	Jacki Willox	54,246	44.7	−0.5
Liberal hold		Swing	+0.5	

1996 Victorian state election: Monash Province
Party	Candidate	Votes	%	±%
Liberal	Peter Katsambanis	66,966	51.7	−4.8
Labor	Nicholas Gold	49,805	38.5	+3.4
Democrats	Julie Peters	8,467	6.5	+6.5
Natural Law	Joan Dickins	2,451	1.9	+1.9
Democratic Labor	Terry O'Hanlon	1,036	0.8	−3.6
Independent	Jonathan Heath	767	0.6	+0.6
Total formal votes		129,492	97.6	+1.9
Informal votes		3,134	2.4	−1.9
Turnout		132,626	90.4	
Two-party-preferred result
Liberal	Peter Katsambanis	70,709	54.8	−5.5
Labor	Nicholas Gold	58,386	45.2	+5.5
Liberal hold		Swing	−5.5	

1992 Victorian state election: Monash Province
Party	Candidate	Votes	%	±%
Liberal	Louise Asher	69,705	56.5	+4.9
Labor	Bunna Walsh	43,217	35.0	−13.4
Democratic Labor	Robert Semmel	5,463	4.4	+4.4
Independent	James Moffatt	4,982	4.0	+4.0
Total formal votes		123,367	95.8	+0.4
Informal votes		5,470	4.2	−0.4
Turnout		128,837	93.7	
Two-party-preferred result
Liberal	Louise Asher	74,292	60.3	+8.7
Labor	Bunna Walsh	48,862	39.7	−8.7
Liberal hold		Swing	+8.7	

=== Elections in the 1980s ===
1988 Victorian state election: Monash Province
Party	Candidate	Votes	%	±%
Liberal	James Guest	48,378	50.8	+2.0
Labor	Perce White	46,919	49.2	+3.7
Total formal votes		95,297	95.5	−1.4
Informal votes		4,465	4.5	+1.4
Turnout		99,762	87.2	−1.8
Liberal hold		Swing	+0.2	

1985 Victorian state election: Monash Province
Party	Candidate	Votes	%	±%
Liberal	Reg Macey	51,526	48.8	
Labor	Bob Miller	48,071	45.5	
Democrats	David Collyer	6,033	5.7	
Total formal votes		105,630	96.9	
Informal votes		3,352	3.1	
Turnout		108,982	89.0	
Two-party-preferred result
Liberal	Reg Macey	53,433	50.6	+2.1
Labor	Bob Miller	52,177	49.4	−2.1
Liberal hold		Swing	+2.1	

1982 Victorian state election: Monash Province
Party	Candidate	Votes	%	±%
Liberal	James Guest	49,420	51.9	−7.7
Labor	Peter Bergin	38,151	40.1	−0.3
Democrats	Theresa Cunningham	7,585	8.0	+8.0
Total formal votes		95,156	97.4	+0.5
Informal votes		2,527	2.6	−0.5
Turnout		97,683	92.1	+1.5
Two-party-preferred result
Liberal	James Guest		55.2	−4.4
Labor	Peter Bergin		44.8	+4.4
Liberal hold		Swing	−4.4	

- Two party preferred vote was estimated.

=== Elections in the 1970s ===
1979 Victorian state election: Monash Province
Party	Candidate	Votes	%	±%
Liberal	Don Hayward	57,361	59.6	−5.1
Labor	Howard Smith	38,798	40.4	+5.1
Total formal votes		96,159	96.9	0.0
Informal votes		3,112	3.1	0.0
Turnout		99,271	90.6	+0.7
Liberal hold		Swing	−5.1	

1976 Victorian state election: Monash Province
Party	Candidate	Votes	%	±%
Liberal	James Guest	65,408	64.7	
Labor	Johan Hulskamp	35,660	35.3	
Total formal votes		101,068	96.9	
Informal votes		3,189	3.1	
Turnout		104,257	89.9	
Liberal hold		Swing		

1973 Victorian state election: Monash Province
Party	Candidate	Votes	%	±%
Liberal	Charles Hider	67,463	56.7	+7.8
Labor	Jean McLean	42,857	36.0	+1.2
Democratic Labor	William Hoyne	8,679	7.3	−6.5
Total formal votes		118,999	96.6	+0.1
Informal votes		4,203	3.4	−0.1
Turnout		123,202	92.0	−0.1
Two-party-preferred result
Liberal	Charles Hider		63.3	−0.4
Labor	Jean McLean		36.7	+0.4
Liberal hold		Swing	−0.4	

- Two party preferred vote was estimated.

1970 Monash Province state by-election
Party	Candidate	Votes	%	±%
Liberal	Charles Hider	53,509	62.5	+13.6
Labor	Donald Reeves	32,172	37.5	+2.7
Total formal votes		85,681	97.5	+1.0
Informal votes		2,167	2.5	−1.0
Turnout		87,848	70.0	−22.1
Liberal hold		Swing	−1.2	

- This by-election was caused by the resignation of Lindsay Thompson, who successfully moved to the lower house at the 1970 Malvern state by-election.

1970 Victorian state election: Monash Province
Party	Candidate	Votes	%	±%
Liberal	Graham Nicol	53,711	48.9	−3.3
Labor	Donald Reeves	38,220	34.8	+2.5
Democratic Labor	William Hoyne	15,137	13.8	−1.6
Independent	Reginald Murphy	2,724	2.5	+2.5
Total formal votes		109,792	96.5	0.0
Informal votes		4,661	3.5	0.0
Turnout		114,453	92.1	+0.8
Two-party-preferred result
Liberal	Graham Nicol	69,938	63.7	−1.6
Labor	Donald Reeves	39,854	36.3	+1.6
Liberal hold		Swing	−1.6	

=== Elections in the 1960s ===
1967 Victorian state election: Monash Province
Party	Candidate	Votes	%	±%
Liberal	Lindsay Thompson	57,009	52.2	
Labor	Graham Lacey	35,266	32.3	
Democratic Labor	William Hoyne	17,046	15.6	
Total formal votes		109,321	96.5	
Informal votes		3,977	3.5	
Turnout		113,298	92.9	
Two-party-preferred result
Liberal	Lindsay Thompson		65.3	
Labor	Graham Lacey		34.7	
Liberal hold		Swing		

1964 Victorian state election: Monash Province
Party	Candidate	Votes	%	±%
Liberal and Country	Graham Nicol	41,769	50.1	+1.3
Labor	Brian Bourke	31,483	37.8	+7.2
Democratic Labor	John Olle	10,059	12.1	−2.6
Total formal votes		83,111	96.4	+1.8
Informal votes		3,115	3.6	−1.8
Turnout		86,426	91.7	+0.2
Two-party-preferred result
Liberal and Country	Graham Nicol		61.0	−5.3
Labor	Brian Bourke		39.0	+5.3
Liberal and Country hold		Swing	−5.3	

- Two party preferred vote was estimated.

1961 Victorian state election: Monash Province
Party	Candidate	Votes	%	±%
Liberal and Country	Charles Gawith	39,572	48.8	−0.8
Labor	Frederick Levin	24,859	30.6	−0.1
Democratic Labor	Thomas Brennan	11,906	14.7	−5.0
Independent	Arthur Bennett	3,612	4.5	+4.5
Independent	Frank Power	1,205	1.5	+1.5
Total formal votes		81,154	94.6	−3.2
Informal votes		4,606	5.4	+3.2
Turnout		85,760	91.5	+2.2
Two-party-preferred result
Liberal and Country	Charles Gawith	53,769	66.3	−0.6
Labor	Frederick Levin	27,385	33.7	+0.6
Liberal and Country hold		Swing	−0.6	

=== Elections in the 1950s ===
Victorian Legislative Council election, 1958: Monash Province
Party	Candidate	Votes	%	±%
Liberal and Country	Graham Nicol	43,317	49.6	−11.9
Labor	Gwendolyn Noad	26,847	30.7	−7.8
Democratic Labor	Thomas Brennan	17,249	19.7	+19.7
Total formal votes		87,411	97.8	−0.5
Informal votes		1,925	2.2	+0.5
Turnout		89,336	89.3	+3.0
Two-party-preferred result
Liberal and Country	Graham Nicol	58,490	66.9	+5.4
Labor	Gwendolyn Noad	28,921	33.1	−5.4
Liberal and Country gain from Democratic Labor		Swing	+5.4	

- Thomas Brennan was elected in 1952 as a member of Labor, then defected to the DLP in 1955.
