= Electoral results for the Eastern Victoria Region =

This is a list of electoral results for the Eastern Victoria Region in Victorian state elections from the region's creation in 2006 until the present.

== Election results ==
=== Elections in the 2020s ===
==== 2022 ====
Labor and the Liberal/National coalition were defending two seats each. The Shooters, Farmers and Fishers were defending one seat.

2022 Victorian state election: Eastern Victoria
Party	Candidate	Votes	%	±%
Quota		78,887		
Liberal/National Coalition	1. Renee Heath (elected 1); 2. Melina Bath (elected 3); 3. David Burgess; 4. Sharn Coombes; 5. Mick Harrington	172,208	36.38	+2.28
Labor	1. Tom McIntosh (elected 2); 2. Harriet Shing (elected 4); 3. Amie Templar-Kanshlo; 4. Jannette Langley; 5. Marg D'Arcy	125,481	26.51	−7.07
Greens	1. Mat Morgan; 2. Adam Frogley; 3. Jessica Wheelock; 4. Lynda Wheelock; 5. Rodrigo Bardales	37,795	7.99	+1.26
Legalise Cannabis	1. Thomas Forrest; 2. Mark Smith	19,654	4.15	+4.15
Democratic Labour	1. Philip Semmel; 2. Catherine Kennedy	18,117	3.83	+2.32
One Nation	1. Warren Pickering; 2. Jeff Waddell	16,964	3.58	+3.58
Shooters, Fishers, Farmers	1. Jeff Bourman (elected 5); 2. Kerrie-Anne Muir	14,217	3.00	−2.01
Liberal Democrats	1. Rob McCathie; 2. Angus Ward	12,130	2.56	−1.47
Justice	1. Ruth Stanfield; 2. Lachlan O'Connell	9,500	2.00	−2.47
Animal Justice	1. Austin Cram; 2. Jennifer McAdam	8,413	1.78	−1.45
Freedom	1. Greg Hansford; 2. Ray Akers	8,385	1.77	+1.77
Family First	1. Milton Wade; 2. Natasha Sawtell	7,634	1.61	+1.61
Sack Dan Andrews	1. Cengiz Coskun; 2. Connie Coskun	3,984	0.84	+0.84
Reason	1. Dean Barnes; 2. Eve Cash	3,498	0.74	−0.07
United Australia	1. James William Unkles; 2. Paul Wilson	3,382	0.71	+0.71
Victorian Socialists	1. Richard Mann; 2. Natalie Acreman	2,300	0.49	+0.27
Angry Victorians	1. Shane Casey; 2. Virginia Rizzo; 3. Ben Marshall	2,280	0.48	+0.48
Companions and Pets	1. John Hutchison; 2. Sean Eddy	2,251	0.48	+0.48
Health Australia	1. Kristy Michelle Wallace; 2. Tania White	1,921	0.41	−0.48
Sustainable Australia	1. Sophie Paterson; 2. Anthony Cresswell	1,772	0.37	−0.50
Transport Matters	1. Ralf Troshen; 2. Mark Dunn	729	0.15	−0.41
New Democrats	1. Srilakshmi Ajjampura; 2. Komalben Rasiklal Darji; 3. Namrata Rajan Shah	533	0.11	+0.11
Independent	1. John O'Brien	170	0.04	+0.04
Total formal votes		473,318	96.94	+0.73
Informal votes		14,948	3.06	−0.73
Turnout		488,266	89.41	−1.67

=== Elections in the 2010s ===
==== 2018 ====
Labor and the Liberal/National coalition were defending two seats each and the Shooters, Fishers and Farmers were defending one.

2018 Victorian state election: Eastern Victoria
Party	Candidate	Votes	%	±%
Quota		77,936		
Liberal/National Coalition	1. Edward O'Donohue (elected 1); 2. Melina Bath (elected 3); 3. Meg Edwards; 4. Karen Chipperfield; 5. Darren Howe	159,520	34.10	−7.47
Labor	1. Jane Garrett (elected 2); 2. Harriet Shing (elected 4); 3. Patrick Kelly; 4. Jane Clarke; 5. Onno van den Eynde	157,020	33.58	+4.58
Greens	1. Tom Cummings; 2. Lachlan Mackenzie; 3. Neale Adams; 4. David Gentle; 5. Donald Stokes	31,467	6.73	−1.75
Shooters, Fishers, Farmers	1. Jeff Bourman (elected 5); 2. Kerrie-Anne Muir	23,409	5.01	+2.57
Justice	1. Rhonda Crooks; 2. Philip Seabrook	20,925	4.47	+4.47
Liberal Democrats	1. Ben Buckley; 2. Rob McCathie	18,856	4.03	−0.71
Animal Justice	1. Leah Folloni; 2. Jennifer McAdam	15,095	3.23	+3.23
Democratic Labour	1. Padraig O'Hea; 2. Larry Norman	7,067	1.51	+0.80
Voluntary Euthanasia	1. Michelle Hain; 2. Martin Barnes	6,222	1.33	+0.12
Aussie Battler	1. Vern Hughes; 2. Paula Mattson	5,685	1.21	+1.21
Health Australia	1. Geoff Pain; 2. Katherine Holmes	4,155	0.89	+0.89
Sustainable Australia	1. Reade Smith; 2. Donna Hannaford	4,092	0.87	+0.87
Reason	1. Carmel Close; 2. Gregory Bell	3,806	0.81	−1.68
Country	1. Rob Danieli; 2. Tony Geitenbeek	3,182	0.68	−0.30
Liberty Alliance	1. Mark Brown; 2. Daniel Jones	2,652	0.57	+0.57
Transport Matters	1. Trevor Salmon; 2. Joshua Roperto	2,622	0.56	+0.56
Victorian Socialists	1. Lainie Cruse; 2. Russell Forden	1,017	0.22	+0.22
Independent	1. Michael Fozard	499	0.11	+0.11
Hudson for Northern Victoria	1. Megan Whittaker; 2. Kristy Hudson	320	0.07	+0.07
Total formal votes		467,611	96.21	+1.48
Informal votes		18,419	3.79	−1.48
Turnout		486,030	91.08	+0.02

==== 2014 ====
2014 Victorian state election: Eastern Victoria
Party	Candidate	Votes	%	±%
Quota		72,799		
Liberal/National Coalition	1. Edward O'Donohue (elected 1); 2. Danny O'Brien (elected 3); 3. Andrew Ronalds; 4. Laetitia Jones; 5. Brenton Wright	181,578	41.57	−11.53
Labor	1. Harriet Shing (elected 2); 2. Daniel Mulino (elected 5); 3. Ian Maxfield; 4. John Anderson; 5. Sorina Grasso	126,667	29.00	+0.61
Greens	1. Andrea Millsom; 2. Louis Delacretaz; 3. Belinda Rogers; 4. Willisa Hogarth; 5. Malcolm Brown	37,053	8.48	−1.80
Liberal Democrats	1. Jim McDonald; 2. Ben Buckley	20,712	4.74	+4.74
Sex Party	1. Ange Hopkins; 2. Ken Hill	10,883	2.49	+2.49
Shooters and Fishers	1. Jeff Bourman (elected 4); 2. David Fent	10,660	2.44	+2.44
Palmer United	1. Sarah Taylor; 2. James Unkles; 3. Daniel Gaylor	10,168	2.33	+2.33
Animal Justice	1. Kristin Bacon; 2. Leah Folloni	8,290	1.90	+1.90
Family First	1. Trudie Morris; 2. Joanne Di Lorenzo	7,372	1.69	−1.59
Voluntary Euthanasia	1. Meg Paul; 2. Bruce Miller	5,288	1.21	+1.21
Christians	1. Ash Belsar; 2. Vivian Hill	4,470	1.02	+1.02
Country Alliance	1. Andrew Jones; 2. Bradley Johnstone	4,293	0.98	−2.15
Democratic Labour	1. Gary Jenkins; 2. Andrew Kis-Rogo	3,080	0.71	−1.23
Rise Up Australia	1. Yvonne Gentle; 2. Jim Gentle	2,555	0.58	+0.58
People Power Victoria	1. Linton Young; 2. Maureen Kirsch	1,825	0.42	+0.42
Cyclists	1. Nick Burke; 2. Geoff Ballard	1,518	0.35	+0.35
Independent	Rhonda Crooks	154	0.04	+0.04
Independent	Christine Sindt	146	0.03	+0.03
Independent	Jean-Michel David	49	0.01	+0.01
Independent	Jeff Bartram	27	0.01	+0.01
Total formal votes		436,788	97.04	
Informal votes		13,335	2.96	
Turnout		450,123	93.96	

==== 2010 ====
2010 Victorian state election: Eastern Victoria
Party	Candidate	Votes	%	±%
Quota		69,410		
Liberal/National Coalition	1. Philip Davis (elected 1); 2. Peter Hall (elected 3); 3. Edward O'Donohue (elected 4); 4. Rosemary Hopgood; 5. Jo Crawford-Wynd	219,990	52.8	+5.0
Labor	1. Matt Viney (elected 2); 2. Johan Scheffer (elected 5); 3. Maida Anderson; 4. Hedley Moffat; 5. Ben Maxfield	118,141	28.4	−6.5
Greens	1. Samantha Dunn; 2. Cheryl Wragg; 3. Penelope Swales; 4. Francine Buckley; 5. Andrea Millsom	43,425	10.4	+1.2
Family First	1. Linden Stokes; 2. Terry Aechlimann	13,626	3.3	−1.2
Country Alliance	1. Andrew Jones; 2. Euan Murphy	13,032	3.1	+3.1
Democratic Labor	1. Walter Ius; 2. Robyn Wyatt	8,243	2.0	+0.8
Total formal votes		416,457	97.1	+0.3
Informal votes		12,295	2.9	−0.3
Turnout		428,752	93.9	+0.1

=== Elections in the 2000s ===
==== 2006 ====
2006 Victorian state election: Eastern Victoria
Party	Candidate	Votes	%	±%
Quota		63,201		
Liberal	1. Philip Davis (elected 1); 2. Edward O'Donohue (elected 3); 3. Susie Manson; 4. Sarah Meredith; 5. Daniel Hyland	148,734	39.2	+2.2
Labor	1. Matt Viney (elected 2); 2. Johan Scheffer (elected 4); 3. Glenyys Romanes; 4. Gregg Cook; 5. Ann Dettrick	132,334	34.9	−5.7
Greens	1. Louis Delacretaz; 2. Jill Redwood; 3. George Beardsley; 4. Catheryn Thompson; 5. Daniel Jordan	34,745	9.2	−1.5
National	1. Peter Hall (elected 5); 2. Janice Coates; 3. Wesley Head; 4. Jenny Hammett; 5. Neville Buckland	32,623	8.6	−1.6
Family First	1. Cameron Eastman; 2. Joshua Reimer; 3. Wendy Buchanan; 4. Mark Harvey; 5. Marcus van Enik	16,895	4.5	+4.5
Democratic Labor	1. Pat Crea; 2. Pat Lamanna; 3. Margaret Hansen; 4. Teresa Evelyn-Liardet	4,467	1.2	+1.2
People Power	1. Gabriela Byrne; 2. Jodie Hughson	3,709	1.0	+1.0
Country Alliance	1. Andrew Jones; 2. Peter Kelly	2,334	0.6	+0.6
Group F	1. Henrie Ellis; 2. Stephen Pearman	1,725	0.45	+0.45
Christian Democrats	1. Wolfgang Voigt; 2. Eddie Brockhus	1,470	0.4	+0.4
Independent	Adnan Glibanovic	165	0.04	+0.04
Total formal votes		379,201	96.8	+0.1
Informal votes		12,625	3.2	−0.1
Turnout		391,826	93.8	
