= Johan Scheffer =

Australian politician

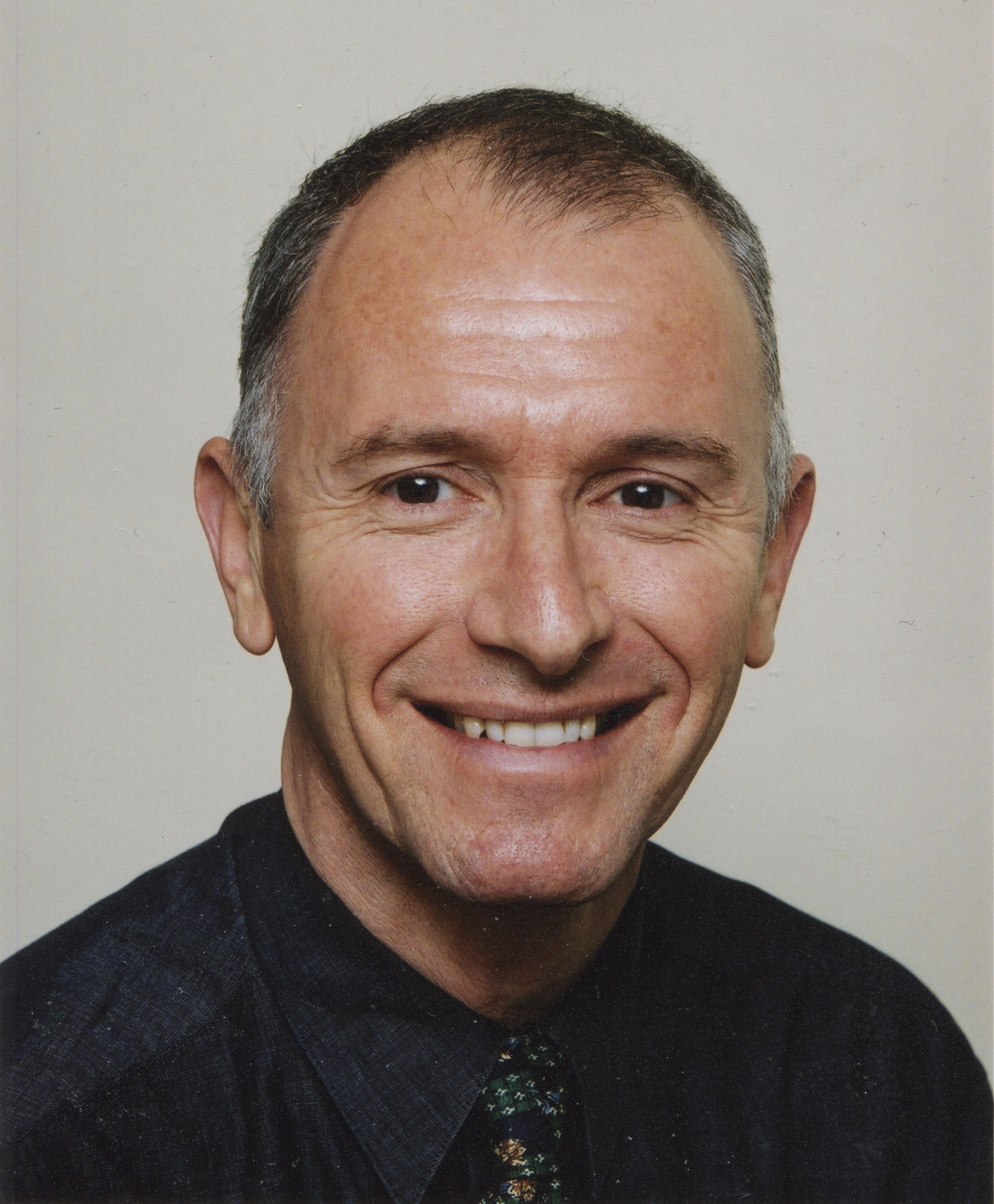

MLC for Eastern Victoria Region
- In office November 2006 – November 2014

MLC for Monash
- In office November 2002 – November 2006

Personal details
- Born: 7 February 1948 (age 78) Jakarta, Indonesia
- Party: Australian Labor Party
- Profession: Retired: former teacher; public servant; business consultant, Member of the Parliament of Victoria in Australia

Johan Emiel Scheffer (born February 7, 1948) is an Australian former politician. He was a member of the Victorian Legislative Council for the Labor Party.

Johan Scheffer joined the Australian Labor Party (ALP) in 1991 and shortly after joined its Socialist Left faction. He was active in the Victorian Branch, holding positions of Local FEA (Federal Electorate Assembly) Secretary and State Conference Delegate for the Federal electorate of Melbourne Ports (renamed Macnamara in 2019). He was elected to the party's State Administrative Committee and to the Agenda Committee (1996-2009).

He was originally elected to the Legislative Council on the 30 November 2002 for Monash Province, becoming only the second Labor member to represent that electorate since its creation in 1937. When Monash Province was abolished in 2006, he was successful in winning one of the five seats in the newly created Eastern Victoria Region of the Legislative Council.

Over his 12 years in the Parliament of Victoria, Scheffer chaired a number of Joint Investigatory Committees, including the Drugs and Crime Prevention Committee, the Family and Community Services Committee and the Law Reform Committee. He also served on the Economic Development, Infrastructure and Outer Suburban/Interface Services and Education Committees of the Parliament.

== Early life ==
Johan Scheffer was born in Batavia (now Jakarta) in the Dutch East Indies (now modern day Indonesia) on February 7, 1948. His family on both sides had lived in Java since the middle of the nineteenth century. His antecedents are of mixed Javanese and European background. His early years were spent in Java and The Netherlands. After a period living in The Hague, the family left the Netherlands in 1952 for Australia, intending to move from there to Malaya. He was educated in Victorian State schools, Monash University and the University of Melbourne.

== Career ==
Johan Scheffer completed his teacher training at the University of Melbourne in 1972 and taught at Xavier College, De La Salle College, Malvern and at University High School. He was a member of the Victorian Secondary Teachers Association (VSTA). He was a program consultant in the Australian Schools Commission's Disadvantaged Schools Program (1984-1988) and for a time, a member of the Program's Ministerial Advisory Committee. In 1988, he was appointed State Manager of the Out of Schools Hours Child Care Program within the Victorian Department of Labour during which time he was an active member of the Community and Public Sector Union Victoria.

Scheffer was a member of the Communist Party of Australia (CPA)1978 until 1986 and joined the Labor Party in 1991. With the fall of the Kirner Labor government in 1992 and the election of the Kennett Government, Scheffer resigned from the Victorian Public Service in 1992. He worked for the Hon Clyde Holding MHR, the Hon Barry Pullen, Member for Melbourne Province in the Victorian Legislative Council and for Gavin Jennings in his electorate office and subsequently as advisor when Jennings was Cabinet Secretary.

Johan Scheffer was appointed Chair of the Board of Sustainability Victoria, a Victorian government agency, in 2021.

== Personal life ==
Johan Scheffer lives in Melbourne, Australia, with his partner, Angela Palmer. They have two sons and one granddaughter.

Victorian Legislative Council
Preceded by Peter Katsambanis	Member for Monash Province; 2002–2006; With: Andrea Coote	Succeeded by Seat abolished
Preceded by Seat created	Member for Eastern Victoria Region; 2006–2014; With: Davis, Viney, O'Donohue, Hall	Succeeded by Daniel Mulino; Harriet Shing
