= Don Hayward (politician) =

Australian politician (born 1932)

The Honourable Don Hayward

Minister for Education
- In office 6 October 1992 – 3 April 1996
- Premier: Jeff Kennett

Member of the Victorian Parliament for Electoral district of Prahran
- In office 2 March 1985 – 29 March 1996
- Preceded by: Bob Miller
- Succeeded by: Leonie Burke

Member of the Victorian Parliament for Monash Province
- In office 5 May 1979 – 1 March 1985
- Preceded by: Charles Hider
- Succeeded by: Reg Macey

Personal details
- Born: 26 September 1932 (age 93) Broken Hill, NSW, Australia
- Party: Liberal (since 1951)

Donald Keith Hayward (born 26 September 1932) is an Australian former politician.

He was born in Broken Hill to James Keith Hayward and Elsa Margaret, née Egan. He attended Broken Hill High School and Homebush Boys High School before studying at Melbourne and Sydney universities, receiving a Bachelor of Laws from the former. In 1953 he was appointed private secretary to the Minister for National Development, then in 1955 he was appointed private secretary to the President of the Senate. He moved to the private sector in 1958, working for Holden where he rose to the positions of public relations director (1966–71), and company director (1966–72, 1978–79). In 1971 he transferred to General Motors Overseas Corporation and held various positions in Southeast Asia, including President and managing director of General Motors Philippines (1972–1976). He was also a member of University of Melbourne's law faculty from 1967 to 1972.

A Liberal Party member since 1951, he was elected to the Victorian Legislative Council in 1979 as one of two members for Monash. In 1985 he transferred to the Legislative Assembly, winning the seat of Prahran. He became Shadow Minister for Education in 1990 and Minister for Education in 1992, serving until his retirement in 1996. After his retirement he joined various government and private sector boards as a non-executive director, including Abigroup (1997-2004).

== Minister for Education ==
As Minister for Education, Hayward implemented a reform program for Victorian Schools called “Schools of the Future”. Following the closure of Richmond Secondary College in 1992, he made the decision in 1993 to open a new school for young women–Melbourne Girls' College, which opened in 1994.

== Autobiography ==
His autobiography was published in e-book format on 11 November 2016.

Victorian Legislative Council
Preceded by Charles Hider	Member for Monash; 1979–1985; Served alongside: James Guest	Succeeded by Reg Macey
Victorian Legislative Assembly
Preceded by Bob Miller	Member for Prahran; 1985–1996	Succeeded by Leonie Burke
