= Edward O'Donohue =

Australian politician

The Honourable Edward O'Donohue
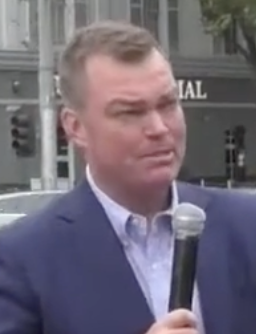

Member of the Victorian Legislative Council for Eastern Victoria
- In office 25 November 2006 – 1 December 2021
- Succeeded by: Cathrine Burnett-Wake

Minister for Corrections
- In office 22 April 2013 – 4 December 2014
- Preceded by: Andrew McIntosh
- Succeeded by: Wade Noonan

Minister for Liquor and Gaming Regulation
- In office 22 April 2013 – 4 December 2014
- Preceded by: Andrew McIntosh
- Succeeded by: Jane Garrett (as Minister for Consumer Affairs, Gaming and Liquor Regulation)

Minister for Crime Prevention
- In office 22 April 2013 – 4 December 2014
- Preceded by: Andrew McIntosh
- Succeeded by: Position abolished

Personal details
- Born: 1 May 1974 (age 52) Melbourne
- Party: Liberal Party
- Website: edwardodonohue.com.au

Edward John O'Donohue (born 1 May 1974) is a former member of the Victorian Legislative Council for the Liberal Party. O'Donohue was elected to the Eastern Victoria Region at the 2006 election.

From 22 April 2013 until its defeat at the 2014 state election, O'Donohue served in the Napthine Ministry as Minister for Liquor and Gaming Regulation, Minister for Corrections, and Minister for Crime Prevention. He replaced Andrew McIntosh, who had resigned from the cabinet on 16 April.

Whilst in opposition, O'Donohue served as Shadow Attorney-General and, in that role, provided commentary on the Nicola Gobbo matter.

In August 2021, O'Donohue made comments on Twitter which were widely criticised as inappropriate, equating the takeover of Afghanistan by the Taliban with the state government's response to the COVID-19 pandemic.

In September 2021, after a discussion with the Liberal Party’s new parliamentary leader Matthew Guy, O'Donohue announced that he would resign from Victorian politics, and did so on 1 December 2021.

Victorian Legislative Council
New region	Member for Eastern Victoria Region; 2006–2021; Served alongside: Philip Davis, Peter Hall, Johan Scheffer, Matt Viney	Succeeded by Cathrine Burnett-Wake
Political offices
Preceded by Andrew McIntosh	Minister for Liquor and Gaming Regulation; 2013–2014	Succeeded by Jane Garrett as Minister for Consumer Affairs, Gaming and Liquor Regulation
Preceded by Andrew McIntosh	Minister for Corrections; 2013–2014	Succeeded by Wade Noonan
Preceded by Andrew McIntosh	Minister for Crime Prevention; 2013–2014	Ministry abolished
