= Christopher Chantler =

Australian physicist

Christopher T. Chantler
- Education: International JARI Enterprise Award; Lady James Prize (Physical Science, UWA); Digby-Fitzhardinge Memorial Prize for Physics; David Syme Research Prize
- Scientific career
- Fields: Biology, earth science, radiation, plasma physics, organometallics, electrodynamics, atomic theory, cluster theory, ions, biophysics, spectroscopy
- Website: www.ph.unimelb.edu.au/~chantler/opticshome/home.html

Christopher T. Chantler is an Australian physicist, currently at University of Melbourne and an Elected Fellow of the American Physical Society who has had works published in the Journal of Physical and Chemical Reference Data, the Journal of Organometallic Chemistry and the X-Ray Spectrometry.

== Early life ==
Chantler grew up in Nedlands, Western Australia, and attended Hollywood Senior High School.

== Societies, committees and institutes ==
Chantler is a member of the:

- American Physical Society (2016-)
- American Chemical Society (2010-)
- Optical Society of America (1993-)
- American Institute of Physics (1993-)
- Australian Optical Society (1994-)
- Institute of Physics (UK) (2004-)
- Society of Crystallographers in Australia and New Zealand (1999-)
- International Radiation Physics Society (1999-)
- International Scientific Advisory Committee, XVUV (2008-)
- International X-ray Absorption Fine Structure Society (2006-)
- Australian X-ray Analytical Association (2006-)
- Legend (2019-)

== Career ==
Chantler is an Associate Editor at the Australian Optical Society News and has been since 1995. He used to be a councilor and director of the Australian Optical Society (AOS) 1996–2007. He has also been a website coordinator at AOS since 2000.
