= James Guest =

Australian politician (born 1937)

James Vincent Chester Guest (born 20 October 1937) is an Australian former politician.

He was born in Melbourne to James Chester Guest, a business manager and Chairman of the Commercial Bank of Australia, and Patricia, née Hammond. A graduate of Geelong Grammar School, he attended Brasenose College at Oxford University, where he received a Master of Arts; he became a barrister-at-law in Lincoln's Inn in 1960. From 1961 he was an associate to Sir Owen Dixon, Chief Justice of Australia; in 1963 he returned to Victoria as a barrister. In 1976 he was elected to the Victorian Legislative Council as a Liberal member for Monash. He served on a number of committees but never rose from the backbench. He retired in 1996.

Though never on the front bench in government he followed his circulation of lengthy policy papers as a new member by taking the leading part in reform of public sector superannuation as a member of parliamentary committees in Opposition while writing innovative policies for the Arts and Federal Affairs as a Shadow Minister and taking an influential part in both extending the scope for Upper House committees and, as a member of a sub-committee of the Australian Constitutional Convention influencing the report on the powers of the Governor-General.

Under the Kennett government he was Chairman of the Parliamentary Law Reform Committee and as such responsible for substantial reports on Reforming the Law of Wills, Health Services and Legal Liability, Phoenix companies and the Jury system involving study of jury systems in situ in six countries.

Victorian Legislative Council
| Preceded by Graham Nicol | Member for Monash; 1976–1996; Served alongside: Charles Hider; Don Hayward; Reg Macey; Louise Asher | Succeeded by Peter Katsambanis |
