= Graham Nicol =

Australian politician

Graham John Nicol ED (17 July 1907 – 28 September 1990) was an Australian politician.

He was born in Windsor, the son of pastoralist F. H. Nicol. He was an accountant, and served in World War II from 1940 to 1945; he was a prisoner of war of the Japanese in Timor and Java. On 14 August 1930 he had married Dorothy Williams, with whom he had two daughters. In 1958 he was elected to the Victorian Legislative Council as a Liberal and Country Party member for Monash Province. He had held high office in the party as chairman of the Young Liberals and a member of the state executive, but he remained on the backbench throughout his parliamentary career. Nicol retired in 1976, and died in 1990.

Victorian Legislative Council
Preceded by Thomas Brennan	Member for Monash; 1958–1976; Served alongside: Charles Gawith; Lindsay Thompson; Charles Hider	Succeeded by James Guest
