= Erik Locke =

Australian political figure

Erik Aldar Locke is an Australian political and business figure, who was the State Secretary of the Australian Labor Party (ALP) in the state of Victoria, a national official for the ALP and a chief of staff in three jurisdictions, as well as having a career in the private sector, in investment banking and entitlements.

== Early life and education ==
Locke was educated at Hollywood Senior High in Western Australia, and later at Griffith University. His mother served as a union official, and his father an academic and psychologist.

== Career ==
Locke worked for Labor in Perth, Western Australia, where he was connected to the Subiaco branch, and then Victorian Labor. He was a leading figure within ALP's Socialist Left faction, but has not been active since the mid-2000s.

Locke was an adviser and Chief of Staff to Lynne Kosky, the Victorian Education Minister, and later became ALP State Secretary. During his two years as State Secretary, Locke brokered a preference deal between the ALP and the Family First Party, helping to elect Family First Steve Fielding as Senator ahead of the Greens, which allowed the Coalition to form an Upper House majority. He resigned from the State Secretary position in April 2005 amidst factional infighting and in protest of a branch stacking controversy.

Locke was later the CEO of CPR Communications and Public Relations, a federal Chief of Staff, the lead of Essential Media Communications' union practice and was an unsuccessful candidate for the ALP in the Legislative Council at the 2014 Victorian state election for Southern Metropolitan Region.

Locke moved to Western Australia to become Chief of Staff to the Deputy Premier, Roger Cook. He was cleared by an independent investigation of bullying. He later disclosed he was suffering from anxiety. He received public support from a number of former colleagues.

He is now the CEO of Incolink, Australia's largest Workers' Entitlement Fund, and appeared on radio and TV current affairs program as an advocate, especially during the COVID-19 pandemic, when Incolink worked to keep the construction industry open.
