= Inclusion Melbourne =

Disability services provider in Australia

Inclusion Melbourne Inc is a non-profit disability service provider in Victoria, Australia. Inclusion Melbourne provides day service activities to adults with intellectual disabilities. Its head office is in Armadale, and the group provides day services to people in twelve municipalities of Melbourne, for disabilities over the full spectrum of impairment.

== History ==
Inclusion Melbourne was founded in 1948 by a group of parents of children with intellectual disabilities who met informally in a small church hall in South Yarra. The cause for these meetings was a wish by the parents for something other than institutional care, which at this time they considered overcrowded and unhygienic, for their children.

In 1951, the Helping Hand League of Victoria (which became known as the Helping Hand Association for Sub-Normal Children) formed a number of sub-branches, including the Prahran-South Yarra sub-branch, with Stan Glassborow as the inaugural president. In 1954, with the support of the then-Mayor of Prahran Charles Gawith, the sub-branch became an independent organisation called Gawith Villa. In that year, Queen Elizabeth II visited Prahran at a Command Variety Performance, with all the proceeds donated to Gawith Villa.

Gawith Villa's change from day service to individualised care commenced in the early 1990s with the appointment of Prof Errol Cocks, formally the Director of Disability Services, Victoria. From this point, Gawith Villa aimed to ensure that people with intellectual disabilities were included in the community, rather than shut away in centres. In the same year Gawith Villa's literacy and numeracy training programs started. In 2007, Gawith Villa sold its centre in Sutherland Road, Armadale. All day services from this point were based in the community.

Gawith Villa renamed itself in 2008 to Inclusion Melbourne Inc, reflecting that it no longer provided centre-based day services.

== Volunteers ==
Inclusion Melbourne makes significant use of volunteers. With a paid staff to volunteer ratio of over ten to one, Inclusion Melbourne has the highest involvement of volunteers supporting people with intellectual disabilities in the sector. Volunteers with Inclusion Melbourne have won several awards, including the City of Stonnington citizen of the year awards in 2011 (individual and group).

== Bibliography ==
- Watson, Andrea. Breaking Wishbones: the story of Gawith Villa. Hybrid Publishers, 2003, ISBN 1 876462 28 0.
