= Eastern Victoria Region =

Electoral region of the Victorian Legislative Council

Eastern Victoria Region Victoria—Legislative Council
- Interactive map of electoral region boundaries from the 2022 state election, along with its composition of electoral districts
- State: Victoria
- Created: 2006
- MP: Melina Bath (National); Jeff Bourman (Shooters); Renee Heath (Liberal); Tom McIntosh (Labor); Harriet Shing (Labor)
- Party: Labor (2); Liberal (1); National (1); Shooters, Fishers, Farmers (1)
- Electors: 546,122 (2022)
- Area: 44,420 km^{2} (17,150.7 sq mi)
- Demographic: Rural
- Coordinates: 37°53′S 147°19′E

Eastern Victoria Region is one of the eight electoral regions of Victoria, Australia, which elects five members to the Victorian Legislative Council (also referred to as the upper house) by proportional representation. The region was created in 2006 following the 2005 reform of the Victorian Legislative Council.

The region comprises the Legislative Assembly districts of Bass, Evelyn, Gippsland East, Gippsland South, Hastings, Monbulk, Mornington, Morwell, Narracan, Nepean and Pakenham.

== Members ==
Members for Eastern Victoria Region
Year	Member	Party	Member	Party	Member	Party	Member	Party	Member	Party
2006	Matt Viney	Labor	Johan Scheffer	Labor	Philip Davis	Liberal	Edward O'Donohue	Liberal	Peter Hall	Nationals
2010	Matt Viney	Labor	Johan Scheffer	Labor	Philip Davis	Liberal	Edward O'Donohue	Liberal	Peter Hall	Nationals
2014	Matt Viney	Labor	Johan Scheffer	Labor	Andrew Ronalds	Liberal	Edward O'Donohue	Liberal	Peter Hall	Nationals
2014	Harriet Shing	Labor	Daniel Mulino	Labor	Jeff Bourman	Shooters, Fishers, Farmers	Edward O'Donohue	Liberal	Danny O'Brien	Nationals
2015	Harriet Shing	Labor	Daniel Mulino	Labor	Jeff Bourman	Shooters, Fishers, Farmers	Edward O'Donohue	Liberal	Melina Bath	Nationals
2018	Harriet Shing	Labor	Jane Garrett	Labor	Jeff Bourman	Shooters, Fishers, Farmers	Edward O'Donohue	Liberal	Melina Bath	Nationals
2021	Harriet Shing	Labor	Jane Garrett	Labor	Jeff Bourman	Shooters, Fishers, Farmers	Cathrine Burnett-Wake	Liberal	Melina Bath	Nationals
2022	Harriet Shing	Labor	Tom McIntosh	Labor	Jeff Bourman	Shooters, Fishers, Farmers	Cathrine Burnett-Wake	Liberal	Melina Bath	Nationals
2022	Harriet Shing	Labor	Tom McIntosh	Labor	Jeff Bourman	Shooters, Fishers, Farmers	Renee Heath	Liberal	Melina Bath	Nationals

== Returned MLCs by seat ==
Seats are allocated by single transferable vote using group voting tickets. Changes in party membership between elections have been omitted for simplicity.

Election	1st MLC	2nd MLC	3rd MLC	4th MLC	5th MLC
2006	Liberal (Philip Davis)	Labor (Matt Viney)	Liberal (Edward O'Donohue)	Labor (Johan Scheffer)	Nationals (Peter Hall)
2010	Liberal (Philip Davis)	Labor (Matt Viney)	Nationals (Peter Hall)	Liberal (Edward O'Donohue)	Labor (Johan Scheffer)
2014	Liberal (Edward O'Donohue)	Labor (Harriet Shing)	Nationals (Danny O'Brien)	SFF (Jeff Bourman)	Labor (Daniel Mulino)
2018	Liberal (Edward O'Donohue)	Labor (Jane Garrett)	Nationals (Melina Bath)	Labor (Harriet Shing)	SFF (Jeff Bourman)
2022	Liberal (Renee Heath)	Labor (Tom McIntosh)	Nationals (Melina Bath)	Labor (Harriet Shing)	SFF (Jeff Bourman)

== Election results ==
Labor and the Liberal/National coalition were defending two seats each. The Shooters, Farmers and Fishers were defending one seat.

2022 Victorian state election: Eastern Victoria
Party	Candidate	Votes	%	±%
Quota		78,887		
Liberal/National Coalition	1. Renee Heath (elected 1); 2. Melina Bath (elected 3); 3. David Burgess; 4. Sharn Coombes; 5. Mick Harrington	172,208	36.38	+2.28
Labor	1. Tom McIntosh (elected 2); 2. Harriet Shing (elected 4); 3. Amie Templar-Kanshlo; 4. Jannette Langley; 5. Marg D'Arcy	125,481	26.51	−7.07
Greens	1. Mat Morgan; 2. Adam Frogley; 3. Jessica Wheelock; 4. Lynda Wheelock; 5. Rodrigo Bardales	37,795	7.99	+1.26
Legalise Cannabis	1. Thomas Forrest; 2. Mark Smith	19,654	4.15	+4.15
Democratic Labour	1. Philip Semmel; 2. Catherine Kennedy	18,117	3.83	+2.32
One Nation	1. Warren Pickering; 2. Jeff Waddell	16,964	3.58	+3.58
Shooters, Fishers, Farmers	1. Jeff Bourman (elected 5); 2. Kerrie-Anne Muir	14,217	3.00	−2.01
Liberal Democrats	1. Rob McCathie; 2. Angus Ward	12,130	2.56	−1.47
Justice	1. Ruth Stanfield; 2. Lachlan O'Connell	9,500	2.00	−2.47
Animal Justice	1. Austin Cram; 2. Jennifer McAdam	8,413	1.78	−1.45
Freedom	1. Greg Hansford; 2. Ray Akers	8,385	1.77	+1.77
Family First	1. Milton Wade; 2. Natasha Sawtell	7,634	1.61	+1.61
Sack Dan Andrews	1. Cengiz Coskun; 2. Connie Coskun	3,984	0.84	+0.84
Reason	1. Dean Barnes; 2. Eve Cash	3,498	0.74	−0.07
United Australia	1. James William Unkles; 2. Paul Wilson	3,382	0.71	+0.71
Victorian Socialists	1. Richard Mann; 2. Natalie Acreman	2,300	0.49	+0.27
Angry Victorians	1. Shane Casey; 2. Virginia Rizzo; 3. Ben Marshall	2,280	0.48	+0.48
Companions and Pets	1. John Hutchison; 2. Sean Eddy	2,251	0.48	+0.48
Health Australia	1. Kristy Michelle Wallace; 2. Tania White	1,921	0.41	−0.48
Sustainable Australia	1. Sophie Paterson; 2. Anthony Cresswell	1,772	0.37	−0.50
Transport Matters	1. Ralf Troshen; 2. Mark Dunn	729	0.15	−0.41
New Democrats	1. Srilakshmi Ajjampura; 2. Komalben Rasiklal Darji; 3. Namrata Rajan Shah	533	0.11	+0.11
Independent	1. John O'Brien	170	0.04	+0.04
Total formal votes		473,318	96.94	+0.73
Informal votes		14,948	3.06	−0.73
Turnout		488,266	89.41	−1.67
