= Cathrine Burnett-Wake =

Australian politician

Cathrine Burnett-Wake MLC

Member of the Victorian Legislative Council for Eastern Victoria Region
- In office 2 December 2021 – 26 November 2022
- Preceded by: Edward O'Donohue
- Succeeded by: Renee Heath

Personal details
- Party: Liberal Party

Cathrine Mary Burnett-Wake is a former Australian politician, who was a member of the Victorian Legislative Council for the Eastern Victoria Region representing the Liberal Party between December 2021 and November 2022. Burnett-Wake was appointed by a joint sitting of the Victorian Parliament on 2 December 2021 to fill a vacancy brought about by the resignation of Edward O'Donohue. She is the first Liberal female upper house member for Eastern Victoria.

Prior to entering the Victorian Parliament, Burnett-Wake was a local government councillor for Yarra Ranges Shire between October 2020 and November 2021, representing the Streeton Ward. She also worked as principal migration agent for Harris Wake, a legal and migration firm she co-founded with Owen Harris. Burnett-Wake sits on the boards of the Burrinja Cultural Centre and the Eastern Alliance for Greenhouse Action.

In July 2022, Burnett-Wake lost preselection to Renee Heath for the 2022 state election.

In her final speech in parliament, Burnett-Wake called on "ordinary people" to "awaken" to extremist political candidates. Burnett-Wake referred to the 'taking over' of Liberal Party branches in Gippsland by right-wing church groups and told the parliament she was concerned about infiltration of the Liberal party by people with "extremist" views – widely interpreted as a reference to Heath.

In February 2023, Burnett-Wake announced that she would run for Liberal preselection for the 2023 Aston by-election. She was unsuccessful in gaining preselection losing out to Roshena Campbell.

Victorian Legislative Council
Preceded by Edward O'Donohue	Member for Eastern Victoria Region; 2021–2022	Succeeded by Renee Heath
