= Charles Gawith =

Australian politician (1910–1982)

Charles Sherwin Gawith (3 June 1910 – 16 September 1982) was an English-born Australian baker, businessman and politician.

== Life and career ==
He was born at Wallasey in Cheshire, the son of baker Thomas George Gawith. He migrated to Australia in 1927 after the failure of his father's business, and held a variety of jobs before founding a bread manufacturing firm with his brother George in Melbourne. Gawith Brothers was in operation by 1928 and was an early leader in packaging sliced bread. The bakery was based in Sydney Road, Brunswick and, later, in Elsternwick and then, Prahran. By 1953, the firm had sixty vans delivering bread in Melbourne. The business was sold to Sunnicrust in 1968.

Gawith was Chairman of Millgate-Jones & Gawith Pty Ltd, engineers, a director of Willetts Pty Ltd, bakery and also a director of Consolidated Insurances of Australia.

== Public service ==
He was Chairman of the Prahran Technical School Council (1955) and was a member Melbourne High School Council. Gawith served on Prahran City Council from 1949 to 1964 and was twice mayor (1953–54, 1960–61). He also served as a JP.

== Other activities ==
He owned a Hereford cattle stud, at Officer.

He was interested in the turf and was part-owner, along with his brother George, of Alrello, King Pedro and Big Philou. The latter horse was expected to win the 1969 Melbourne Cup, but was nobbled and had to be scratched before the race. He later decided to have the horse trained on his property at Officer. Another of his horses was Special Boy which won the Pakenham Cup in 1972.

He was married twice. His first wife was Beryl Holden, with whom he had three children. His second wife was German-born Margot Schwison, with whom he had another daughter.

== State Politics ==
In 1955, he was elected to the Victorian Legislative Council as a Liberal and Country Party member for Monash Province. He lost preselection in 1967 and retired from politics.

== Recognition ==
In 1954, during his term as mayor of Prahran, a new training centre for the mentally handicapped was opened in the municipality at 65 Sutherland Road, Armadale. It was run by the Helping Hand Association and was named Gawith Villa in honor of Charles Gawith.

He was awarded the Order of the Star of Italian Solidarity in 1969.

Gawith retired to Buderim in Queensland and he died there on 16 September 1982.

Victorian Legislative Council
Preceded by Sir Frank Clarke	Member for Monash; 1955–1967; Served alongside: Thomas Brennan; Graham Nicol	Succeeded by Lindsay Thompson
