= Clifford Hayes =

Australian former politician (born 1951)

Clifford Hayes MLC

Member of the Victorian Legislative Council for Southern Metropolitan Region
- In office 24 November 2018 – 26 November 2022
- Preceded by: Sue Pennicuik
- Succeeded by: Katherine Copsey

Mayor of Bayside
- In office 2008–2010

Councillor of the City of Bayside for Northern Ward
- In office 29 November 2008 – 27 October 2012

Councillor of the City of Bayside for Were Ward
- In office 2005 – 29 November 2008

Personal details
- Born: 13 August 1951 (age 75) Melbourne, Victoria, Australia
- Party: Sustainable Australia (since 2010)
- Occupation: Film editor

Clifford Hayes (born 13 August 1951) is an Australian former politician. He was a Sustainable Australia member of the Victorian Legislative Council between 2018 and 2022, representing Southern Metropolitan Region. He was not re-elected at the 2022 state election.

== Film career ==
Before entering politics, Hayes worked as a television and film editor. In 1979, he and Tony Paterson jointly won the AFI Award for Best Editing for their work on the film Mad Max.

== Political career ==
=== Local government (2005–2012) ===
In 2005, Hayes was elected as an independent councillor for the City of Bayside council representing the single-councillor ward of Were, winning 37.91% of the first preference vote. In 2008, following electoral boundary changes, he was re-elected to the new Northern ward with a quota that included a first preference vote of 20.69%. He was the Mayor of Bayside from 2009 to 2010. Hayes joined the Sustainable Australia Party in 2010. In 2012, he failed to be re-elected after his first preference vote percentage almost halved to 11.26%.

=== State parliament (2018–2022) ===
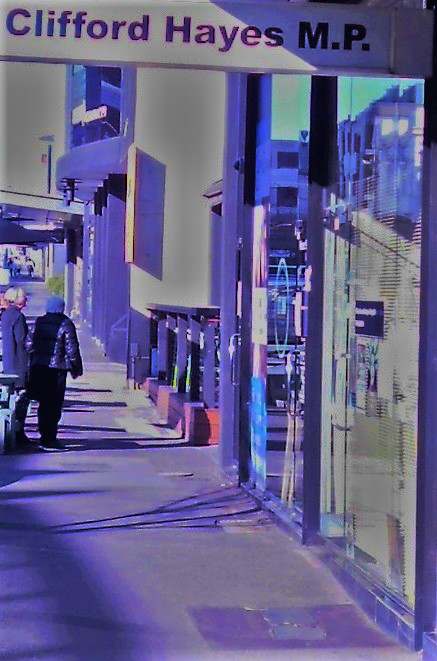
Hayes' office in Brighton

In 2018, Hayes stood as the leading candidate for Sustainable Australia for the Southern Metropolitan Region in the Parliament of Victoria. Hayes was elected to the final vacancy in the Southern Metropolitan Region with 1.32% of the vote.

In 2019, Hayes drafted a Motion in the Victorian Parliament to restore local democracy in planning issues and curb the power of the Victorian Civil Administrative Tribunal. In doing so, Hayes said that many residents had lost their right to a say in the character of their street, their neighbourhood and their community and called for "real say back in the hands of residents".

The Motion passed in the Legislative Council with the support of Members of the Liberal Party and the majority of the crossbench.

Later that year, Hayes proposed a Bill to legislate the changes outlined in the previous Motion. The Bill was defeated in the Legislative Council, 22–18. The Labor Government, Fiona Patten, Stuart Grimley, Tania Maxwell and Jeff Bourman voted against the legislation.

Hayes was elected as Deputy Chair of the Legislative Council's Planning and Environment Committee, a standing committee appointed to find solutions and improvements to planning and environmental regulations in the state of Victoria.

In 2019, Hayes also moved a Motion in Parliament to ban property developer donations to political parties. His Motion was defeated by Labor Government and Liberal Party Members. Later that year, Hayes voted in favour of allowing transgender people to self ID their gender on documents without having to have surgery.

In 2020, Hayes secured an Inquiry into Planning and Heritage in Victoria. Hayes said the Inquiry was needed to protect Victoria's "dwindling" heritage and to make improvements to a "broken" planning system. The Motion was supported by the Labor Government and the Liberal Party. It is expected to take place in 2021.

In 2021 Hayes voted against Change or Suppression (Conversion) Practices Prohibition Bill 2020, claiming it to be 'a trojan horse for overreach'.

According to The Age, between November 2018 and November 2021, Hayes voted with the Andrews Government's position 40.3% of the time, one of the lowest figures of any Legislative Council crossbencher.
