= Hollywood Senior High School =

Former school in Perth, Western Australia

Location
- Smyth Road; Nedlands, Western Australia; Australia

Information
- Type: Public co-educational high school
- Motto: Latin: Fide et Labore
- Opened: 1958
- Closed: 2000

Hollywood Senior High School was a public co-educational high school, located in the suburb of Nedlands in Perth, Western Australia. It was opened in 1958, replacing the earlier Claremont High School. It was closed in 2000 and amalgamated with another similar school, Swanbourne Senior High School, to form a new school, Shenton College at a new but nearby location.

== Notable alumni ==
- Adam Bandt – politician
- Kim Beazley – former deputy prime minister of Australia, former ambassador to the United States, former governor of Western Australia
- Christopher Chantler – physicist
- Stuart Leach – musician
- Erik Locke – political figure
- Alsy MacDonald – musician
- Graham Moss – AFL footballer
- David Parker – politician
- Louise Sauvage – paralympic wheelchair racer
- Joel Quartermain – musician
- Tracy Vo – television journalist
- Katrina Stratton – politician
