= Sue Pennicuik =

Australian politician (born 1957)

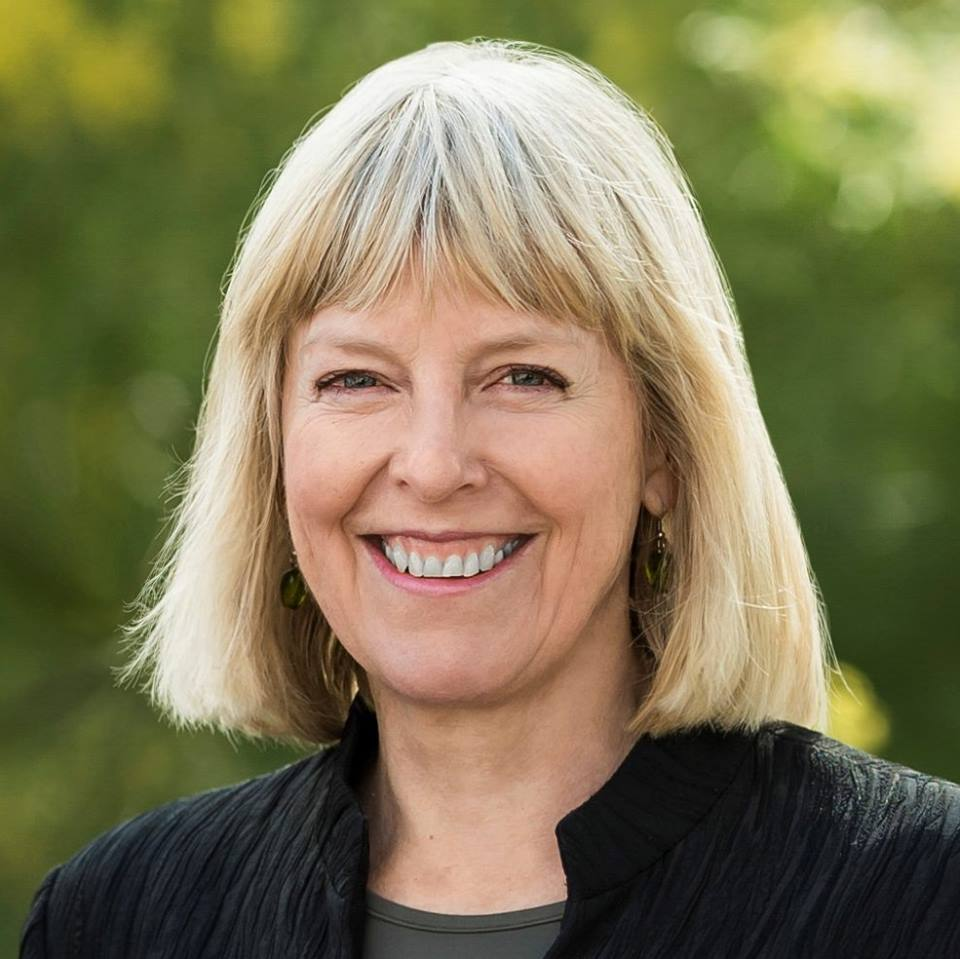

Councillor of the City of Glen Eira for Rosstown Ward
- In office 27 April 2022 – 12 November 2024
- Preceded by: Neil Pilling

Member of the Victorian Legislative Council
- In office 25 November 2006 – 24 November 2018
- Succeeded by: Clifford Hayes
- Constituency: Southern Metropolitan Region

Personal details
- Born: 17 April 1957 (age 69) Melbourne, Victoria, Australia
- Party: Greens
- Education: Monash University; University of Western Australia
- Occupation: Teacher; Environment Officer; Politician
- Website: Official website animals.org.au

Susan Margaret Pennicuik (/ˈpɛniːkuː/ PEN-ee-koo; born 17 April 1957) is an Australian former politician who served as a Greens member of the Victorian Legislative Council from 2006 to 2018. From April 2022 to November 2024, Pennicuik served as a councillor on the City of Glen Eira.

== Early career ==
Pennicuik studied Arts at Monash University and later Applied Science, majoring in Physical Education, at the former Footscray Institute of Technology. Afterwards, Pennicuik worked as a fitness instructor.

She then obtained a Diploma of Education from the University of Western Australia, afterwards working as a secondary English and Physical Education teacher.

She then went on to work as an environment officer for the Australian Manufacturing Workers Union, later obtaining a Masters in Environmental Science from Monash University.

She then worked a coordinator for the Occupational Health and Safety Unit of the ACTU from 1997 to 2004, which conducted research and produced OHS information for unions. She worked on national OHS standards and led campaigns on a range of issues including stress and bullying at work, safer working hours and banning asbestos.

Pennicuik then worked for the Australian Drug Foundation from 2004 to 2006 developing resources on alcohol and work. At the same time, she was party convener of the Victorian Greens.

== Politics ==
=== Early political career (1997–2006) ===
Pennicuik was a candidate for the 1998 Australian Constitutional Convention on the Greens' ticket, listed as 'Australian Greens – For A Republic'.

Pennicuik stood for the former Ormond Ward on Port Phillip City Council in 2004, gaining 34% of the primary votes.

=== Member of the Legislative Council (2006–2018) ===
Pennicuik won a seat for the Greens in the Southern Metropolitan Region of the Victorian Legislative Council in the 2006 state election, elected as the fourth member of the region, polling 15.34% of votes, and was amongst the first Greens elected to the Victorian Legislative Council along with Colleen Hartland and Greg Barber. She was re-elected in 2010 and 2014, but defeated in 2018.

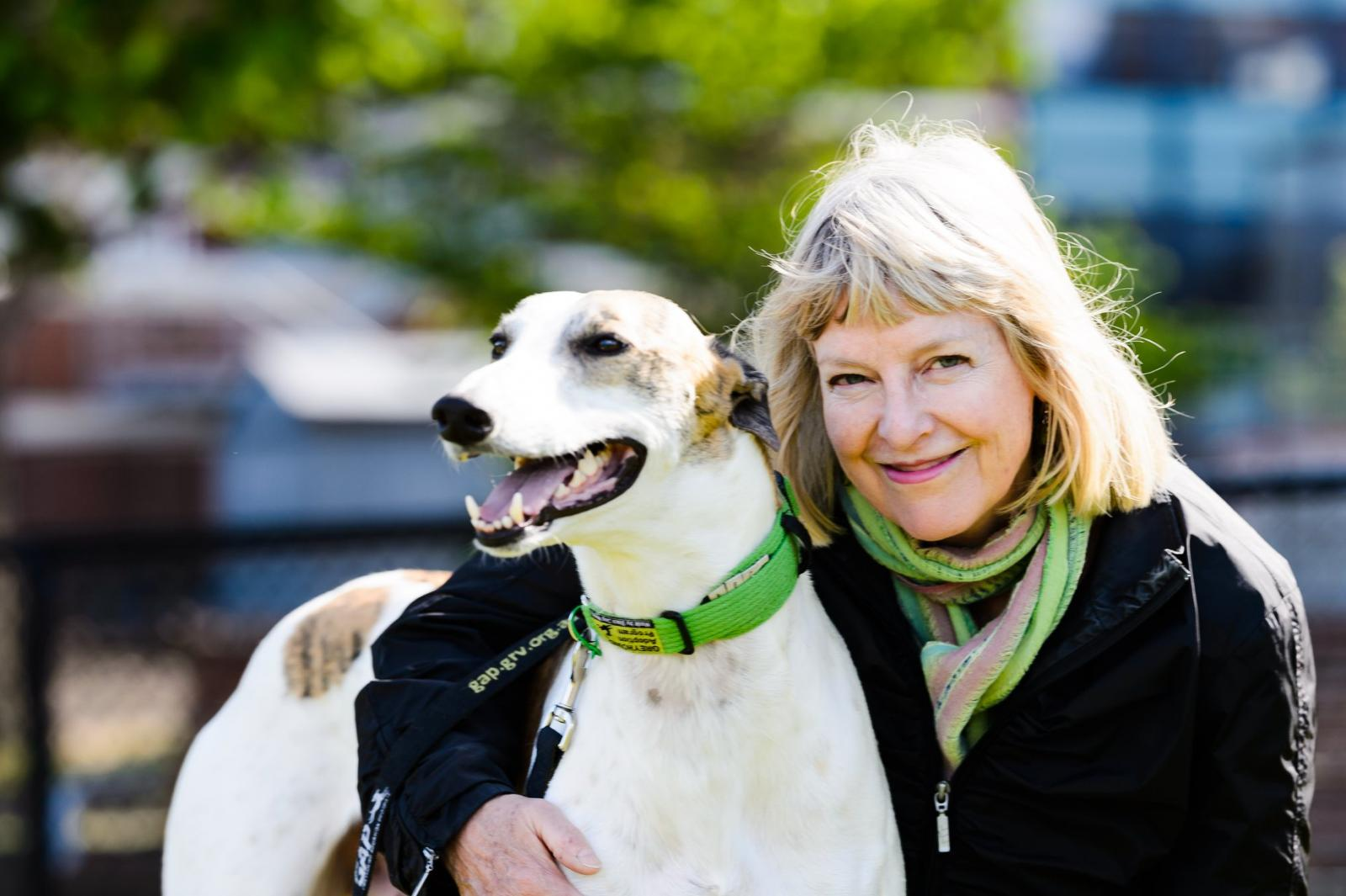
As spokesperson for animals for the Victorian Greens, Pennicuik campaigned for the welfare of greyhounds and an end to greyhound racing.

During her time as a Member for the Legislative Council, Pennicuik has campaigned to ban ducking shooting in Victoria; end greyhound racing and jumps racing; supported community campaigns to save live music; and supported marriage equality.

Under successive governments, Pennicuik campaigned to abolish puppy mills in Victoria. In 2017, the government passed legislation that limited the number of fertile animals a breeder could own.

In August 2017, Pennicuik moved a motion to establish a parliamentary inquiry into the government's plans to sell off multiple public housing estates in Melbourne's inner suburbs, including the Markham Estate in Ashburton, Victoria. The motion was successful and the inquiry is expected to deliver a report in 2018.

Pennicuik has served on a number of committees since entering parliament in 2006. These committees have included the Select Committee on Public Land Development (May 2007 – September 2008); Legislative Council Legislation Committee and Legislative Council Standing Orders Committee (May 2007 – November 2010); Environment and Planning Legislation Committee and Environment and Planning References Committee (February 2011 – November 2014); Legislative Council Privileges Committee (May 2007 – November 2010 and June 2011 – November 2014); Dispute Resolution Committee (May 2007 – November 2010 and June 2011 – November 2014); and Public Estimates and Accounts (March 2009 – November 2010, and 2016 to 2018).

=== Post-Legislative Council (2018–present) ===
In 2019, Pennicuik was announced as the Greens candidate for the electorate of Goldstein at the 2019 Australian federal election.

In 2020, Pennicuik ran in the 2020 local government elections for the City of Glen Eira in Rosstown Ward. Following the resignation of councillor Neil Pilling in 2021, Pennicuik was elected to Glen Eira City Council following a countback of votes on 27 April 2022.
