= Andrew Ronalds =

Australian politician (born 1973)

Member of the Victorian Legislative Council
- In office 5 February 2014 – 29 November 2014

Personal details
- Born: 31 May 1973 (age 53)
- Party: Liberal Party
- Occupation: Businessman, Farmer

Andrew Mark Ronalds is an Australian politician who represented the Eastern Victoria Region for the Liberal Party in the Victorian Legislative Council from 5 February to 29 November 2014.

He replaced Philip Davis after his retirement in January 2014. Ronalds directed Jindi Cheese from 1995 to 2005. Ronalds was also the Director of Dairy Cropping Australia from 2008 to 2014.

== Early life and education ==
Ronalds was born and raised in Gippsland, growing up on the family farm in Jindivick. He was educated at Drouin West Primary School and St Paul's Anglican Grammar School, Warragul.

== Professional career ==
Ronalds graduated from Deakin University in 1995 with a Bachelor of Commerce. He was later appointed managing director of Jindi Cheese and in 2007 established Dairy Cropping Australia. In recent time, with wife, Catriona, he owns Australian Country Retail which incorporates The Stable Door and Aussie Wool Comfort. The Stable Door has a chain of western wear stores across Australia.

== Political career ==
Ronalds is a member of the Liberal Party's Warragul Branch and served as president and Secretary of the Branch. Before entering Parliament he was Chairman of the Eastern Victoria Electorate Conference and the McMillan Federal Electorate Conference. He was also a Member of State Council and Policy Assembly.

From 2006 Ronalds was a member of the executive of the Liberal Party, the Administrative Committee, serving as a vice president from 2007 to 2011. During his time on the Administrative Committee he also Chaired the Federal Seats Committee and the Senate Committee, was a delegate to the Federal Council and was involved in party reforms as well as numerous other organisational committees.

Ronalds won pre-selection for the Upper House seat of Eastern Victoria in December 2013 following the announcement that predecessor Philip Davis would retire after 21 years in Parliament. He was sworn into the Legislative Council on 5 February 2014 and appointed to the Parliament's Accountability and Oversight Committee and Economic Development and Infrastructure and Outer Suburban Committee. Since leaving Parliament he has continued to be influential within the party structure.
