= Cluster theory =

Theory that states that concentrating industries in specific areas has advantages

Cluster theory is an economic theory of strategy where the concentration of specialized industries in an area allows greater economic activity to take place. Clusters promote both competition and cooperation.

== History ==
The theory was first presented by Alfred Marshall, in his book Principles of Economics, published in 1890, first characterized clusters as a "concentration of specialized industries in particular localities" that he termed industrial districts.

== Theory ==
The theory states that concentrating industries in specific regions creates several advantages. For one, greater economic activity occurs when many firms cluster in one area. In turn, this creates agglomeration spillovers which increases the total factor productivity of firms in the same county since they are all competing for the top spot. In most cities/countries economic activity is spatially spread out which can lead to low cost of labor due to low levels of competition. In clusters, areas of high economic activity, labor and land are valued very high as there are superior worker-firm matches in denser labor markets. Clusters produce economies of agglomeration which benefit companies due to the transport cost saving (Glaeser); the closer you are to your neighboring firm the easier it is to exchange goods and ideas. Moreover, the steady presence of an unchanging customer base guarantees their business and steady income. The steady presence of suppliers means low costs for the firms as well as an advantage to agglomeration includes cheaper and more rapid supply of intermediate goods.

Clusters create the notion of rivals through numerous firms competing for resources and for customers in a close proximity. Nevertheless, clusters are more efficient in promoting cooperation which typically involves companies in related or supporting industries. The theory states that concentrating industries in specific regions creates several advantages. Due to high volumes of firms in a vicinity, companies are forced to further innovate and produce advancements in their respected industries. These innovations increase the levels of knowledge in the region. Higher production levels arise from increased density as well as increasing levels of the interconnection of businesses.

Geographic concentration also creates more personable relations that yield better business in all manners. Often times, city officials will incentivize high-tech companies to set up shop in close relation of each other to induce the cluster effect. In urban studies, the term agglomeration is used.

== Types ==
Most economists believe that there are four compositions of clusters which can be identified:

- Geographical cluster – a cluster of businesses in a geographical location where enough resources have accumulated to give a competitive advantage to businesses in a given economic branch e.g. the California wine cluster or the flower cluster in the Netherlands.
- Sectoral clusters - a cluster of businesses operating together from within the same economic sector e.g. Silicon Valley
- Horizontal cluster - are built between businesses that compete for the same market, e.g. multiple producers combining to establish a retail shop
- Vertical cluster - are alliances between businesses which belong to different levels of the same supply chain, such as a buyer assisting its suppliers in upgrading.

Over the years various types of clusters have formed. Different business clusters are formed based on different types of knowledge. These clusters include high tech, factor endowment, low cost manufacturing and knowledge service clusters. High tech clusters are incredibly technology oriented and have a much greater dependence on intellectual property due to the constant increasing levels of ideas, innovations and pertinent information. [5] Factor endowment clusters are created via way of comparative advantage due to geographical location. For example, numerous avocado companies located in California and Florida essentially monopolize the market as their states' weather provides the perfect conditions for avocados to grow and ripen. Moreover, these prime geographical locations for certain products produce factor endowment clusters. Low cost manufacturing clusters typically emerge in developing countries. The emergence of business clusters in developing countries allows for low labor cost to their employees yet high production levels due to the amount of employees they can employ. Additionally, firms in these clusters sell to developed countries ( e.g. electronic clusters in Mexico serve to companies in the U.S.) . [6] Knowledge Service clusters are similar to low cost manufacturing clusters as they also typically arise in developing countries. Firms in these clusters provide technological based knowledge services such as software, analytic and engineering services. Countries in which knowledge service cluster exist include India, Brazil and China.[7]

== Examples ==
An example of the cluster theory in effect can be found in the California wine cluster mentioned above. The "cluster" consists of thousands of independent vineyards and hundreds of commercial wineries which supplies the vast majority of the American wine production. If California were a separate country, it would be the world's fourth largest wine producer. Wine has become an important factor in the local economy as an extensive system of industries has grown around these businesses to support the grape-growing and wine-making processes. Industry-related business include suppliers of grape stock, irrigation and harvesting equipment, barrels, and labels; specialized public relations and advertising firms; and numerous wine publications aimed at consumer and trade audiences.

The most well-known business cluster in the world began in the 1990s when several successful computer technology start-ups began in Silicon Valley in California. This led most of the people who wished to create a computer technology company to do so in Silicon Valley. The growth in the number and scale of Silicon Valley companies led to a similar growth of venture capital firms in Silicon Valley. This in turn encouraged more entrepreneurs to locate their businesses in the valley in what became a yet to end positive feedback loop. The cluster effect in the capital market also led to a cluster effect in the labor market. As an increasing number of companies started up in Silicon Valley, programmers, engineers etc. flocked to the area in pursuit of job opportunities which further incentivized tech companies to come to silicon Valley since they were in need of workers with those skillsets. Silicon Valley today is the home to many huge technology start-ups such as Facebook and Google; these companies indirectly compete with each other which inadvertently generates not only high-levels of economic activity but high levels of economic growth as well. Though these firms compete, they also work together to increase profits for both firms. For example, Apple may run an ad on Facebook which Facebook gets compensated for and Apple will inevitably make more money from these ad's due to subconscious reinforcement of the product. Thus, these tech firms that cluster produce economies of agglomeration which is beneficial to most firms in the cluster due to the boost in productivity

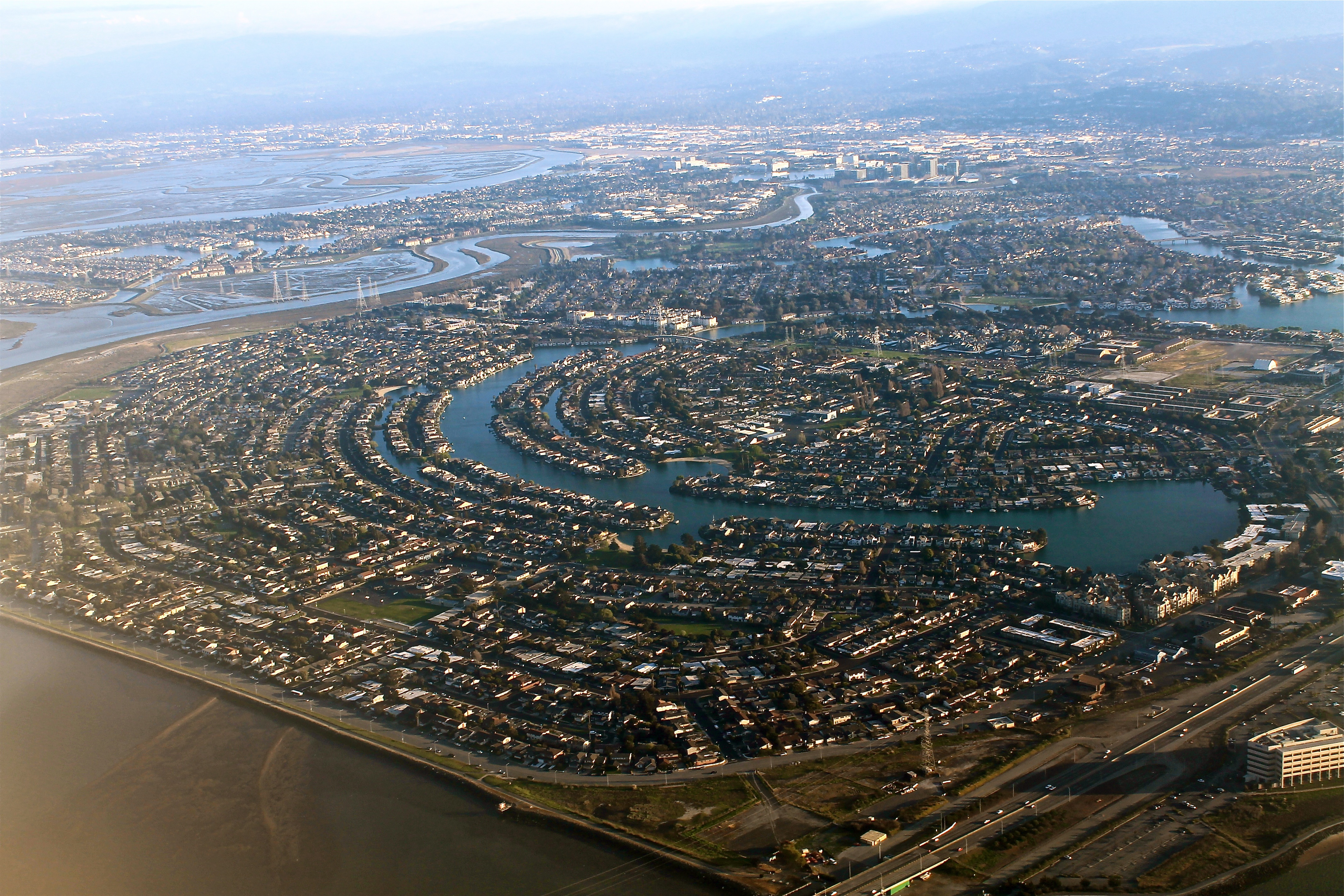
Image depicts how large the tech cluster in Silicon Valley is via an aerial view.

== See also ==
- Business cluster
- Economies of agglomeration
