= Ryan Batchelor =

Australian politician

Ryan Batchelor MLC

Member of the Victorian Legislative Council for Southern Metropolitan Region
- Incumbent
- Assumed office November 2022

Ryan Batchelor is an Australian politician. He is a member of the Victorian Legislative Council representing the Southern Metropolitan Region since November 2022. Batchelor is a member of the Labor Party.

He is the son of former Victorian minister Peter Batchelor.

== Early life ==
Batchelor has a Bachelor of Arts with First Class Honours in Political Science from the University of Western Australia, a Bachelor of Laws from Monash University, and a Masters in Public Policy from the University of Cambridge. Before entering Parliament, Batchelor worked as a public servant, political adviser, and policy researcher.

During the Gillard Federal Labor Government, he served as Director of Policy in the Office of Prime Minister Julia Gillard MP. During this time, he also worked as Chief of Staff to Minister Jenny Macklin MP, and as a senior adviser to Deputy Prime Minister Anthony Albanese MP. From 2015 to 2019 Batchelor worked as a senior executive in the Victorian Department of Premier and Cabinet, and was Victorian Executive Director of the McKell Institute in Victoria from 2020 until 2022.

== Politics ==
Batchelor was elected as a member of the Victorian Legislative Council representing the Southern Metropolitan Region on 26 November 2022.

Since 21 November 2023, he has been Chair of the Legislative Council Environment and Planning Committee. He has served as Deputy Chair of the Legislative Council Legal and Social Issues Committee since 24 February 2023, and he has been a Member of the Integrity and Oversight Committee since 22 February 2023.

From 9 March 2023 to 20 February 2024, Batchelor was Chair of the Select Committee on Victoria's Recreational Native Bird Hunting Arrangements.

In August 2023, Batchelor and Belinda Wilson MP were accused of yelling at Greens MP Tim Read in the halls of the Victorian Parliament.
