= Margaret Fitzherbert =

Australian politician (born 1969)

Member of the Victorian Legislative Council for Southern Metropolitan Region
- In office 29 November 2014 – 24 November 2018

Personal details
- Born: 11 November 1969 (age 56)
- Party: Liberal Party

Margaret Fitzherbert (born 11 November 1969) is an Australian politician. She was a Liberal member of the Victorian Legislative Council, representing Southern Metropolitan Region from 2014 to 2018.

She completed a BA (Hons) at Monash University. Later, she attained a Grad Dip in Labour Relations Law from the University of Melbourne and a Master of Arts (Communications) from RMIT University, where she won the Fairfax Business Media Prize. Before entering parliament, she held various positions in business, most recently director of the Royal Women's Hospital (2012–14) and chair of the board (2013–14).

Fitzherbert has worked as an industrial advocate, representing employers, and was a ministerial adviser to Judi Moylan as Minister for Women, and David Kemp as Minister for Education, Training and Youth Affairs. She also worked in senior communications roles for various employers, including ANZ and the National Australia Bank. She has been a member of the Victorian working party for the Australian Dictionary of Biography since 2008.

Following her election, Fitzherbert was appointed Shadow Parliamentary Secretary for Women's Health, and Rural and Regional Health. She was defeated at the 2018 state election.

Fitzherbert has written extensively on women and politics. Her first book, Liberal Women, was shortlisted for a NSW Premier's History Award in 2004, and was followed by So Many Firsts in 2009. She was one of the first to speak out publicly about the practice of Liberal preselectors asking women about their childcare arrangements.
