= John Berger (politician) =

Australian politician

John Berger MLC

Member of the Victorian Legislative Council for Southern Metropolitan Region
- Incumbent
- Assumed office December 2022

Deputy Government Whip in the Victorian Legislative Council
- Incumbent
- Assumed office December 2022
- Preceded by: Position Created

Personal details
- Party: Labor

John Berger is an Australian politician and trade unionist. He has been a Labor Party member of the Victorian Legislative Council since December 2022, representing the Southern Metropolitan Region. Since December 2022, Berger has served as the Deputy Government Whip in the Legislative Council.

Prior to Berger's election into the Victorian Parliament, he served as the State Secretary of the Transport Workers Union (Vic/Tas) Branch from 2016 to 2021 and the National President of the Transport Workers Union from 2019 to 2021.

== Early life and education ==
Berger was born in Melbourne, Victoria in 1964. He attended St Joseph's College Melbourne and completed his high school education at Assumption College Kilmore. Berger completed a graduate certificate in Industrial Relations/Human Resources at Victoria University between 2004 and 2008. Additionally, Berger completed the Williamson Community Leadership Program in 2008.

== Career before politics ==
Prior to his career as a union official, Berger was a baggage handler for the former airline Ansett.

=== Early career ===
Berger joined Ansett as a baggage handler for 10 years where he was a member of the Transport Workers Union. Berger started at the Transport Workers Union (Vic/Tas) in 1996. Berger was elected as an organiser as well as to the Branch Committee of Management. Upon Bill Noonan's retirement on 18 November 2009, Berger became the Assistant Secretary of the Transport Workers Union. The union's key achievements included the passing of ground-breaking legislation to establish the Road Safety Remuneration Tribunal, in the 20-year ‘Safe Rates’ campaign.

=== Secretary of the Transport Workers Union (Vic/Tas) Branch ===
On 29 April 2016, Berger took over as the Secretary of the Transport Workers Union (Vic/Tas), where he was re-elected in December 2018. Berger was also elected as the Transport Workers Union National Vice President in September 2018, and later National President in May 2019. Additionally, Berger also served as a director of TWU Super, one of the first super funds to be created.

==== Return to industrial action ====
Under Berger's leadership, the Transport Workers Union (Vic/Tas) Branch successfully fought for improved safety and pay conditions for the members, with a return to industrial action and focus on grassroots strength. For example, the Union oversaw its first industrial action in the bus industry in 20 years. In 2017, the union oversaw 62 new enterprise agreements and won over $250,000 in disputes for members.

In 2020, with hundreds of enterprise agreements set to expire concurrently, the union successfully organised extensive industrial action for its members.

==== Bus driver safety ====
Likewise, when the introduction of the cashless MYKI system saw a surge in attacks on bus drivers, where senior organiser Mike McNess successfully campaigned to provide Security Screens for bus drivers to protect them from harm.

==== Wage theft criminalisation ====
Berger led the Resolution at the 2017 Victorian Labor Party Conference to criminalise wage theft in Victoria, later becoming law.

==== COVID-19 Pandemic ====
With the advent of the COVID-19 pandemic, Berger worked with the Victorian Government to ensure that truck drivers returning from NSW would be exempt from isolation requirements. Likewise, the union lobbied the Federal Government to extend JobKeeper provisions to drivers employed by foreign owned companies, like DNATA. Additionally, the union took Qantas to the High Court for the unfair dismissal and outsourcing of 2000 ground handling staff.

=== End of union career ===
In December 2021, Berger was pre-selected by the Victorian Labor Party as a Legislative Council candidate for the Southern Metropolitan Region. Upon the successful pre-selection, Berger resigned from his positions in the Transport Workers Union. His successor, Mike McNess took over as the Secretary of the branch and was re-elected in December 2022.

== Political career ==
Berger was elected at the 2022 Victorian Election as one of two Labor Members for Southern Metropolitan Region in the Legislative Council of the 60th Parliament of Victoria. In December 2022, Berger was appointed as the first Deputy Government Whip for the Legislative Council.

== Personal life ==
Berger is an avid Collingwood Football Club and Melbourne Storm supporter.
