= Renee Heath =

Member of the Victorian Legislative Council

Renee Heath MLC
- Heath in 2026

Member of the Victorian Legislative Council for Eastern Victoria Region
- Incumbent
- Assumed office 26 November 2022

Secretary of the Parliamentary Liberal Party
- Incumbent
- Assumed office 20 December 2022

Personal details
- Born: Morwell
- Party: Liberal Party
- Website: https://www.reneeheath.com.au

Renee Heath is an Australian politician who is a current member for Eastern Victoria Region in the Victorian Legislative Council. She is a member of the Liberal Party and was preselected for the 2022 state election, defeating Cathrine Burnett-Wake as the first person on the Liberal Party's group voting ticket for the Eastern Victoria Region.

== Political career and personal life ==
Heath is a lifelong member of the "ultra-conservative City Builders' church," a church led in Australia by her father that is accused of having historic links to gay conversion practices. Her preselection was controversial and viewed as a victory for the conservative faction of the Liberal Party over its moderate faction. At the time of Heath's preselection, other Eastern Victorian Liberals and former members of the City Builders church spoke out about the church's "ambitions to shift Victorian politics to the hard right."

Following revelations of Heath's role in the church and its opposition to gay, transgender and reproductive rights, Liberal leader Matthew Guy announced prior to the election that if and when elected, Heath would not be allowed to join the Liberal Party's parliamentary caucus. This followed criticism by her Liberal Party predecessor, Cathrine Burnett-Wake, who in her final speech in parliament called on "ordinary people" to "awaken" to extremist political candidates. Burnett-Wake referred to the 'taking over' of Liberal Party branches in Gippsland by right-wing church groups and told the parliament she was concerned about infiltration of the Liberal party by people with "extremist" views – widely interpreted as a reference to Heath.

Following Heath's election and Guy stepping down as leader of the party, this decision to exclude Heath from the parliamentary party was overturned by new Liberal leader John Pesutto. Heath was also appointed by Pesutto to be the Secretary of the Parliamentary Liberal Party for the 60th Parliament of Victoria. In her inaugural speech, Heath stated that "Victorians should not be told what to think, what to say, how to worship, how to raise their children. This is symptomatic of a failed socialist experiment which has reinvented itself as a cultural movement in our time." On 12 May 2023, Heath was demoted from Secretary of the Parliamentary Liberal Party in the wake of a caucus meeting held to vote on the expulsion of fellow Liberal MP Moira Deeming, in which Heath produced three different versions of minutes, one of which was leaked to the media. Heath is considered a close ally of Deeming.

In August 2023, Heath appeared ‘at two events attended by conspiracy theorists’ that promoted conspiracies about vaccinations and the ‘deracinating’ of Australia. In 2024, Heath abstained from voting in support of the Labor government's wind energy target, despite support from the Liberal opposition.

In October 2025, Heath’s sister, Clare Heath-McIvor, told a Victorian parliamentary inquiry into cults and organised fringe groups that ‘leaders of some churches in the New Apostolic Reformation movement, of which her father’s church is a part, believe “God’s Law” overrides the state’s.’ Heath McIvor said in this inquiry that gay conversion practices and coercion of women in these churches who reported alleged sexual assaults, may still be happening in the state.
