= Monash Province =

Former electoral province of the Victorian Legislative Council, Australia

Monash Province Victoria—Legislative Council
- State: Victoria
- Created: 1937
- Abolished: 2006
- Namesake: John Monash

Monash Province was an electorate of the Victorian Legislative Council until 2006. It was abolished from the 2006 state election in the wake of the Bracks Labor government's reform of the Legislative Council.

== Members for Monash Province ==
Member 1	Party	Year		
Frank Clarke	United Australia	1937	Member 2	Party
Frank Clarke	United Australia	1940	Archibald Crofts	United Australia
Frank Clarke	United Australia	1942	Frank Beaurepaire^{[r]}	United Australia
Frank Clarke	United Australia	1943	Frank Beaurepaire^{[r]}	United Australia
Frank Clarke	United Australia	1943	Frank Beaurepaire	United Australia
Frank Clarke	Liberal	1945	Frank Beaurepaire	Liberal
Frank Clarke	Liberal	1946	Frank Beaurepaire	Liberal
Frank Clarke	Liberal and Country	1949	Frank Beaurepaire	Liberal and Country
Frank Clarke	Liberal and Country	1949	Frank Beaurepaire	Liberal and Country
Frank Clarke	Liberal and Country	1952	Thomas Brennan	Labor
Frank Clarke	Liberal and Country	1955	Thomas Brennan	Labor (A-C)
Charles Gawith	Liberal and Country	1955	Thomas Brennan	Labor (A-C)
Charles Gawith	Liberal and Country	1955	Thomas Brennan	Labor (A-C)
Charles Gawith	Liberal and Country	1958	Graham Nicol	Liberal and Country
Charles Gawith	Liberal and Country	1961	Graham Nicol	Liberal and Country
Charles Gawith	Liberal and Country	1964	Graham Nicol	Liberal and Country
Charles Gawith	Liberal	1965	Graham Nicol	Liberal
Lindsay Thompson	Liberal	1967	Graham Nicol	Liberal
Lindsay Thompson	Liberal	1970	Graham Nicol	Liberal
Charles Hider	Liberal	1970	Graham Nicol	Liberal
Charles Hider	Liberal	1973	Graham Nicol	Liberal
Charles Hider	Liberal	1976	James Guest	Liberal
Don Hayward	Liberal	1979	James Guest	Liberal
Don Hayward	Liberal	1982	James Guest	Liberal
Reg Macey	Liberal	1985	James Guest	Liberal
Reg Macey	Liberal	1988	James Guest	Liberal
Louise Asher	Liberal	1992	James Guest	Liberal
Louise Asher	Liberal	1996	Peter Katsambanis	Liberal
Andrea Coote	Liberal	1999	Peter Katsambanis	Liberal
Andrea Coote	Liberal	2002	Johan Scheffer	Labor

^{[r]} Beaurepaire resigned in August 1943, re-elected in October 1943

== Election results ==
2002 Victorian state election: Monash Province
Party	Candidate	Votes	%	±%
Liberal	Peter Katsambanis	55,855	43.5	−8.1
Labor	Johan Scheffer	46,697	36.3	−1.2
Greens	Jo Lewis	23,154	18.0	+18.0
Democrats	David Zemdegs	2,795	2.2	−5.3
Total formal votes		128,501	97.0	+0.2
Informal votes		4,015	3.0	−0.2
Turnout		132,516	89.2	
Two-party-preferred result
Labor	Johan Scheffer	66,740	51.9	+7.5
Liberal	Peter Katsambanis	61,761	48.1	−7.5
Labor gain from Liberal		Swing	+7.5	
