= Katherine Copsey =

Australian politician

Katherine Copsey MLC
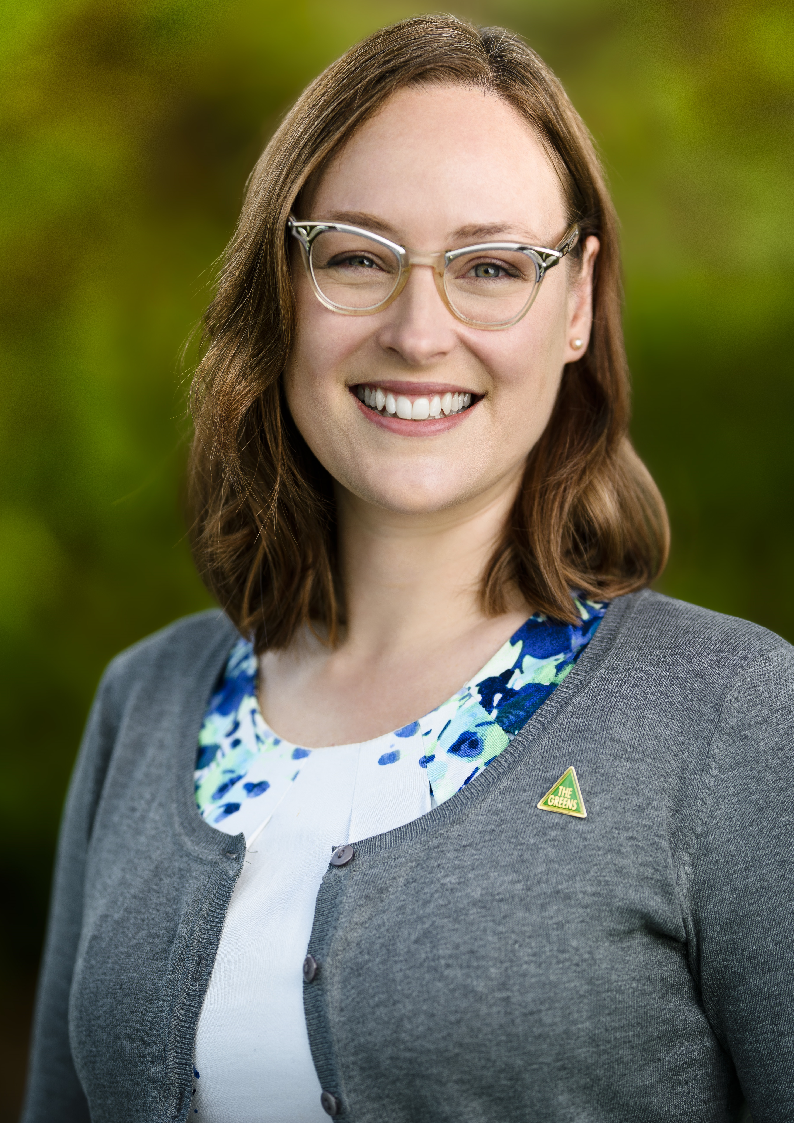

Member of the Victorian Legislative Council for Southern Metropolitan Region
- Incumbent
- Assumed office 26 November 2022
- Preceded by: Clifford Hayes

3rd Deputy Mayor of Port Phillip
- In office 10 November 2016 – 8 November 2017
- Preceded by: Serge Thomann
- Succeeded by: Dick Gross

Personal details
- Party: Greens

Katherine Copsey is an Australian politician and lawyer who is a member of the Victorian Legislative Council for the Greens, representing the Southern Metropolitan Region. She was elected at the 2022 Victorian state election.

Copsey is by profession a planning and environment lawyer and community organiser. Prior to being elected to parliament, she was a member of Port Phillip City Council representing Lake Ward. She advocates for increased policies to mitigate climate change, reforms to support the interests of renters, and the construction of affordable housing. Copsey serves as the Victorian Greens' Spokeswoman for Justice, Transportation and Animal Welfare.

Copsey is an active opponent of expanding the amount of time in which the Australian Grand Prix gets exclusive access to Albert Park and Lake, arguing that doing so would harm residents by giving too much priority to the interests of the FIA. Copsey is an advocate for price controls on supermarket groceries, noted by the Herald Sun as clashing with Victorian Treasurer Jaclyn Symes over the issue. This was considered surprising by the newspaper, as price controls on supermarket goods would have reduced the value of shares Copsey holds in the Woolworths Group.
