= Southern Metropolitan Region =

Electoral region of the Victorian Legislative Council

Southern Metropolitan Region Victoria—Legislative Council
- Interactive map of electoral region boundaries from the 2022 state election, along with its composition of electoral districts
- State: Victoria
- Created: 2006
- MP: Ryan Batchelor (Labor); John Berger (Labor); Katherine Copsey (Greens); Georgie Crozier (Liberal); David Davis (Liberal)
- Party: Labor (2); Liberal (2); Greens (1)
- Electors: 542,200 (2022)
- Area: 243 km^{2} (93.8 sq mi)
- Demographic: Metropolitan
- Coordinates: 37°53′S 145°2′E

Southern Metropolitan Region is one of the eight electoral regions of Victoria, Australia, which elects five members to the Victorian Legislative Council (also referred to as the upper house) by proportional representation. The region was created in 2006 following the 2005 reform of the Victorian Legislative Council.

The region comprises the Legislative Assembly districts of Albert Park, Ashwood, Bentleigh, Brighton, Caulfield, Hawthorn, Kew, Malvern, Oakleigh, Prahran and Sandringham. The region covers most of the wealthiest areas of Melbourne, with only a few traditional Labor areas (Oakleigh being the only historically safe Labor seat).

== Members ==
Members for Southern Metropolitan Region
Year	Member	Party	Member	Party	Member	Party	Member	Party	Member	Party
2006	Sue Pennicuik	Greens	John Lenders	Labor	Evan Thornley	Labor	Andrea Coote	Liberal	David Davis	Liberal
2009	Sue Pennicuik	Greens	John Lenders	Labor	Jennifer Huppert	Labor	Andrea Coote	Liberal	David Davis	Liberal
2010	Sue Pennicuik	Greens	John Lenders	Labor	Georgie Crozier	Liberal	Andrea Coote	Liberal	David Davis	Liberal
2014	Sue Pennicuik	Greens	Philip Dalidakis	Labor	Georgie Crozier	Liberal	Margaret Fitzherbert	Liberal	David Davis	Liberal
2018	Clifford Hayes	Sustainable	Philip Dalidakis	Labor	Georgie Crozier	Liberal	Nina Taylor	Labor	David Davis	Liberal
2019	Clifford Hayes	Sustainable	Enver Erdogan	Labor	Georgie Crozier	Liberal	Nina Taylor	Labor	David Davis	Liberal
2022	Katherine Copsey	Greens	John Berger	Labor	Georgie Crozier	Liberal	Ryan Batchelor	Labor	David Davis	Liberal

== Returned MLCs by seat ==
Seats are allocated by single transferable vote using group voting tickets. Changes in party membership between elections have been omitted for simplicity.

Election	1st MLC	2nd MLC	3rd MLC	4th MLC	5th MLC
2006	Liberal (David Davis)	Labor (John Lenders)	Liberal (Andrea Coote)	Greens (Sue Pennicuik)	Labor (Evan Thornley)
2010	Liberal (David Davis)	Labor (John Lenders)	Liberal (Andrea Coote)	Liberal (Georgie Crozier)	Greens (Sue Pennicuik)
2014	Liberal (David Davis)	Labor (Philip Dalidakis)	Liberal (Georgie Crozier)	Greens (Sue Pennicuik)	Liberal (Margaret Fitzherbert)
2018	Liberal (David Davis)	Labor (Philip Dalidakis)	Liberal (Georgie Crozier)	Labor (Nina Taylor)	Sustainable (Clifford Hayes)
2022	Liberal (David Davis)	Labor (John Berger)	Liberal (Georgie Crozier)	Greens (Katherine Copsey)	Labor (Ryan Batchelor)

== Election results ==
Labor and the Liberal Party were defending two seats each. Sustainable Australia was defending one seat.

2022 Victorian state election: Southern Metropolitan
Party	Candidate	Votes	%	±%
Quota		78,309		
Liberal/National Coalition	1. David Davis (elected 1); 2. Georgie Crozier (elected 3); 3. Nick Stavrou; 4. Andrew Litwinow; 5. Monica Clark	169,681	36.11	−1.78
Labor	1. John Berger (elected 2); 2. Ryan Batchelor (elected 5); 3. Clive Crosby; 4. Lynn Psaila; 5. Muhammad Shahbaz	139,722	29.74	−5.45
Greens	1. Katherine Copsey (elected 4); 2. John Friend-Pereira; 3. Anna Parker; 4. Kylie Rocha; 5. Shanae Rowick	72,410	15.41	+2.31
Legalise Cannabis	1. Marc Selan; 2. Ben Howman	13,681	2.91	+2.91
Liberal Democrats	1. Matthew Ford; 2. David Segal	11,696	2.49	+0.96
Democratic Labour	1. Theodore Tsoingas; 2. Dean Chambers	10,385	2.21	+0.02
Reason	1. Andrew Johnson; 2. Stephen Jasper	9,511	2.02	+0.07
Animal Justice	1. Ben Schultz; 2. Michelle McGoldrick	6,698	1.43	−0.72
Sustainable Australia	1. Clifford Hayes; 2. Allan Doensen	5,170	1.10	−0.19
Family First	1. Vickie Janson; 2. Alex Van Der End	4,734	1.01	+1.01
Justice	1. Ellie Jean Sullivan; 2. Michaele Dale	3,807	0.81	−0.67
Sack Dan Andrews	1. Nursin Akdogan; 2. Reyhan Adonir	3,542	0.75	+0.75
One Nation	1. Chris Bradbury; 2. Craig Pickering	3,072	0.65	+0.65
Freedom	1. Natasha Kons; 2. Madeleine Kons	2,810	0.60	+0.60
Victorian Socialists	1. Jack Todaro; 2. Liam Kruger	2,516	0.54	+0.07
United Australia	1. Leon Kofmansky; 2. Julie McCamish	2,177	0.46	+0.46
Shooters, Fishers, Farmers	1. Nicole Bourman; 2. Michelle Collyer	1,966	0.42	−0.22
Health Australia	1. Kellie Thomas; 2. Mark Lambrick	1,935	0.41	−0.07
Transport Matters	1. Paul Tammesild; 2. Marc Peters	1,480	0.31	−0.04
Companions and Pets	1. Joan Molyneux; 2. Max Winch	1,257	0.27	+0.27
Angry Victorians	1. Dean Hurlston; 2. Robert John Kamp	915	0.19	+0.19
New Democrats	1. Krishna Dharmeshkumar Brahmbhatt; 2. Jigarkumar Ahbaysinh Chaudhary; 3. Ravinder Singh Marwaha	688	0.15	+0.15
Total formal votes		469,853	97.98	+0.45
Informal votes		9,702	2.02	−0.45
Turnout		479,555	88.45	−0.88
