= Harriet Shing =

Australian politician

The Honourable Harriet Shing MLC
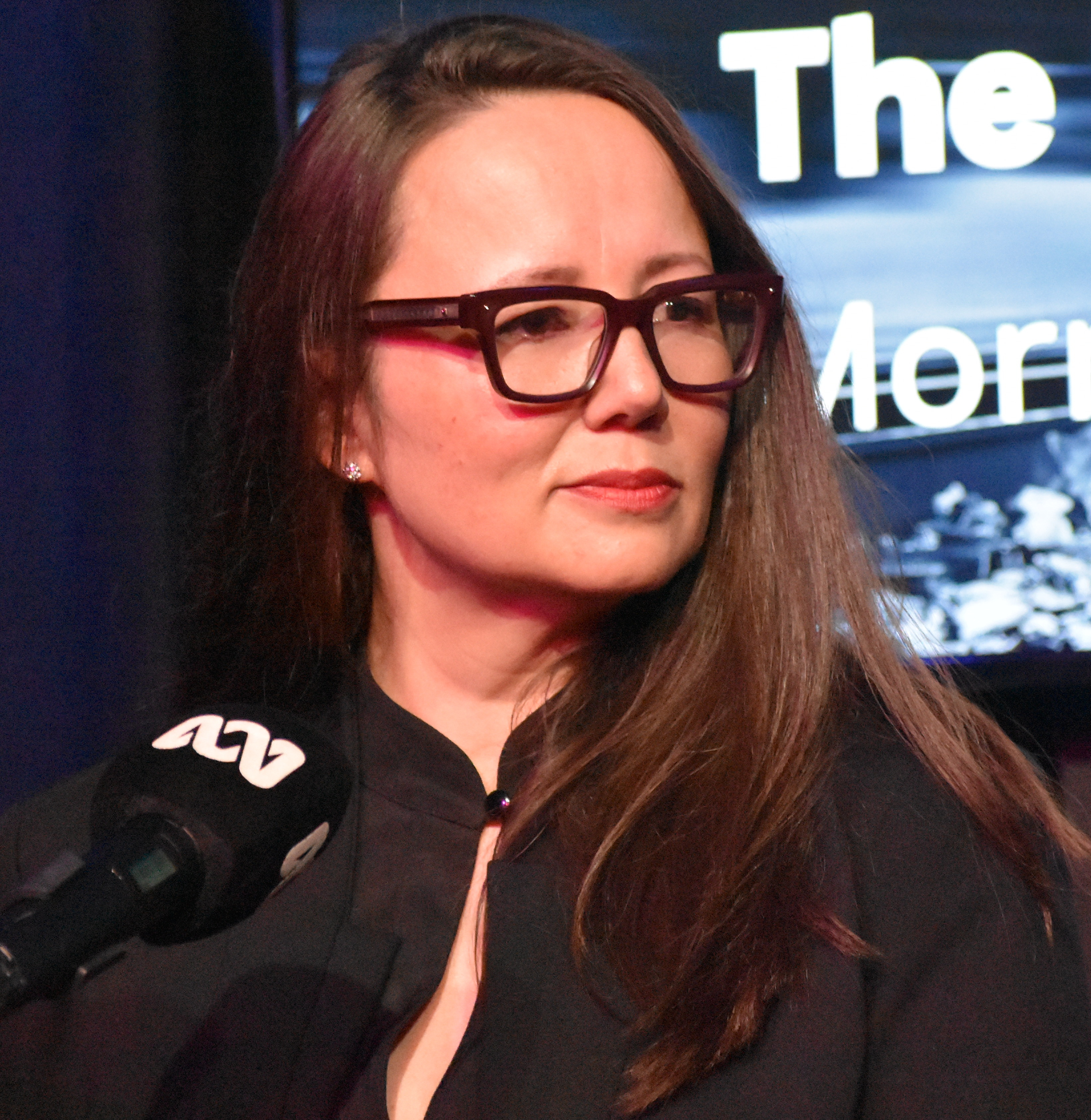
- Shing in 2025

Minister for Health
- In office 15 April 2026 – 4 August 2026
- Premier: Jacinta Allan
- Preceded by: Mary-Anne Thomas
- Succeeded by: Ingrid Stitt

Minister for Ambulance Services
- In office 15 April 2026 – 4 August 2026
- Premier: Jacinta Allan
- Preceded by: Mary-Anne Thomas
- Succeeded by: Ingrid Stitt

Minister for Water
- In office 15 April 2026 – 4 August 2026
- Premier: Jacinta Allan
- Preceded by: Gayle Tierney
- Succeeded by: Michaela Settle
- In office 27 June 2022 – 19 December 2024
- Premier: Daniel Andrews; Jacinta Allan
- Preceded by: Lisa Neville
- Succeeded by: Gayle Tierney

Minister for Development Victoria and Precincts
- In office 19 December 2024 – 15 April 2026
- Premier: Jacinta Allan
- Preceded by: Colin Brooks
- Succeeded by: Jaclyn Symes

Minister for Housing and Building
- In office 19 December 2024 – 15 April 2026
- Premier: Jacinta Allan
- Preceded by: Herself (as Minister for Housing)
- Succeeded by: Nick Staikos

Minister for Housing
- In office 2 October 2023 – 19 December 2024
- Premier: Jacinta Allan
- Preceded by: Colin Brooks
- Succeeded by: Herself (as Minister for Housing and Building)

Minister for Equality
- In office 27 June 2022 – 19 December 2024
- Premier: Daniel Andrews; Jacinta Allan
- Preceded by: Martin Foley
- Succeeded by: Vicki Ward

Minister for Commonwealth Games Legacy
- In office 5 December 2022 – 27 July 2023
- Premier: Daniel Andrews
- Preceded by: Shaun Leane
- Succeeded by: Position abolished

Minister for Regional Development
- In office 27 June 2022 – 2 October 2023
- Premier: Daniel Andrews
- Preceded by: Mary-Anne Thomas
- Succeeded by: Gayle Tierney

Member of the Victorian Legislative Council for Eastern Victoria Region
- Incumbent
- Assumed office 29 November 2014

Personal details
- Born: 17 October 1976 (age 49)
- Party: Labor Party
- Domestic partner: Lissie Ratcliff
- Website: www.harrietshing.com.au

Harriet Claire Su Mei Wong King Shing (born 17 October 1976) is an Australian politician. She is a Labor member of the Victorian Legislative Council, having represented the Eastern Victoria Region since 2014.

Shing is the first openly lesbian member of the Parliament of Victoria. She is also a member of the Labor Left faction of the Labor Party.

In June 2022, Shing was appointed Minister for Equality, Regional Development and Water. This made her Victoria's first cabinet minister with a Chinese background, and along with Steve Dimopoulos, became one of Victoria's first openly gay frontbenchers.

== Political career ==
Shing was first elected to the Victorian Legislative Council in 2014.

=== Parliamentary Secretary roles ===
Shing has held a number of Parliamentary Secretary and Ministerial roles.

Parliamentary Secretary roles
Position	Duration
Parliamentary Secretary for Emergency Services	July 2016 to December 2018
Parliamentary Secretary for Mental Health	December 2018 to December 2020
Parliamentary Secretary for Digital Government	December 2021 to June 2022
Parliamentary Secretary for Water	December 2020 to June 2022
Parliamentary Secretary for Equality	June 2020 to June 2022
Parliamentary Secretary for Creative Industries	June 2020 to June 2022

=== Ministerial roles ===
Since April 2026, Shing has been Minister for Health, Minister for Ambulance Services, and Minister for Water.

Ministerial roles
Position	Duration
Minister for Regional Development	June 2022 to October 2023
Minister for Equality	June 2022 to December 2024
Minister for Water	June 2022 to December 2024
Minister for Commonwealth Games Legacy	December 2022 to July 2023
Minister for Regional Development	December 2022 to October 2023
Minister for Housing	October 2023 to December 2024
Minister for Development Victoria and Precincts	December 2024 to April 2026
Minister for Housing and Building	December 2024 to April 2026
Minister for the Suburban Rail Loop	December 2024 to April 2026
Minister for Health	April 2026 to current
Minister for Ambulance Services	April 2026 to current
Minister for Water	April 2026 to current

Political offices
Preceded by Lisa Neville	Minister for Water; 2022–present	Incumbent
Preceded by Mary-Anne Thomas	Minister for Regional Development; 2022–present	Incumbent
Preceded by Martin Foley	Minister for Equality; 2022–present	Incumbent
