= Jeff Bourman =

Australian politician (born 1967)

Jeffrey Bourman MLC

Member of the Victorian Legislative Council for Eastern Victoria Region
- Incumbent
- Assumed office 29 November 2014

Personal details
- Born: 19 February 1967 (age 59) Ipswich
- Party: Shooters, Fishers and Farmers Party
- Spouse: Nicole Bourman
- Children: Rebecca Bourman
- Occupation: Parliamentarian, Police officer, IT contractor

Jeffrey Matthew Bourman (born 19 February 1967) is an Australian politician. He is a Shooters, Fishers and Farmers Party member of the Victorian Legislative Council, having represented Eastern Victoria Region since 2014. Jeff Bourman was the founder of the Victorian Branch of the Shooters, Fishers and Farmers Party and has served as the Chairman of the Victorian Branch since its inception.

Bourman was a police officer with Victoria Police, before leaving to pursue a career in information technology.

According to The Age, between November 2018 and November 2021, Bourman voted with the Andrews Government's position 48.2% of the time.

Bourman was first elected at the 2014 Victorian state election and re-elected in 2018 and 2022.

== Political positions ==
=== Gun control ===
Bourman opposes gun control arguing that it is ineffective and politically motivated, particularly in the wake of tragedies. He is a vocal critic of both the Coalition and Labor for their roles in enacting national firearms agreements.

=== Hunting ===
Bourman has advocated for a "Hunters for the Hungry" program, proposing that venison from government-controlled deer culls and surplus meat from licensed hunters be processed and distributed to food banks and homeless shelters. He argues the policy would simultaneously help address Victoria's increasing deer population and provide food relief to people.

=== Israel–Palestine conflict ===
Bourman is a supporter of Israel and has expressed skepticism toward a two-state solution. Bourman has claimed that Hamas has "thrown homosexuals off buildings" and "beheaded fucking children".

Bourman opposed a motion moved by Greens MLC Sarah Mansfield regarding the Victorian government's agreements with Israeli defence entities. In his speech, he characterised the motion as a political stunt, defended Israel's right to respond militarily to Hamas and argued that the focus should be on the group's actions rather than transparency over defence contracts. He stated that a lasting peace could only follow Hamas's surrender and the return of all hostages.

== Personal life ==
Bourman is married with one child and lives in Hampton East, Victoria. His wife and daughter are Jewish. Bourman does not believe in a god.
