= Andrea Coote =

Australian parliamentarian

Member of the Victorian Legislative Council for Southern Metropolitan Region
- In office 18 September 1999 – 29 November 2014

Personal details
- Born: 18 July 1951 (age 74) Melbourne
- Party: Liberal Party
- Children: 3

Andrea Coote (born 18 July 1951) is an Australian former parliamentarian. She was a Liberal member of the Victorian Legislative Council from 1999 to 2014, representing Monash Province until the 2006 election and the Southern Metropolitan Region thereafter.

Coote was born in Melbourne, and studied at Fintona Girls' School and the University of Melbourne. Before being elected to parliament, she worked in a number of business and executive positions, which included stints as Executive Director of the State Library Foundation (1994–1996) and Director of Development at Geelong Grammar School (1996–1998). In the early 1990s, she also worked as a staff officer to Member of the Legislative Assembly Michael John, and later as a ministerial adviser.

Coote succeeded in winning Liberal pre-selection for the safe Liberal-held seat of Monash Province in the leadup to the 1999 election, and was ultimately elected. Jeff Kennett's Liberal government, however, had suffered a surprise defeat, so Coote found herself in opposition. Despite this, due to the way the Legislative Council is elected, the Liberal Party still had control of the upper house, giving them significant power to reject legislation introduced by the new Labor government. In her first term in office, Coote was a member of the Legislative Council Printing Committee, and in 2000, also gained a seat on the Economic Development Committee.

During her first term, Coote also became notable for her support of the lesbian, gay, bisexual and transgender communities. Coote became one of a small group of Liberal Legislative Councillors - along with Andrew Olexander (since expelled from the parliamentary Liberal Party following a drink-driving incident), and before they lost their seats at the 2002 election, Peter Katsambanis and Leonie Burke - that lobbied for gay-friendly changes in party policy. Along with these three, Coote regularly met with representatives from the LGBT communities in Melbourne. The Victorian Gay and Lesbian Rights Lobby specifically singled out Coote for praise, describing her as "very proactive on gay issues". The influence of Coote and her allies was most clearly illustrated when the Liberal Party backed down on its prior opposition to the 2001 Statute Law Further Amendment (Relationships) Bill, which Coote spoke in support of. The passage of the bill resulted in major changes, requiring that lesbian and gay relationships be treated equally in fields such as property, superannuation, and medication decision-making.

The 2002 election was devastating for the Liberal Party, resulting in the loss of their control of the Legislative Council, and with Katsambanis and Burke being among those losing their seats. However, this opened up a number of new shadow ministerial positions, and Coote was one of those promoted. She became Shadow Minister for Tourism, Deputy Leader of the Opposition in the Legislative Council, Manager of the Opposition Business in the Council and Shadow Minister for Ageing and Carers. She also received the additional portfolio of Victorian Communities in January 2004.

Coote was re-elected in 2006 to the Southern Metropolitan Region. In 2006, she was appointed Shadow Minister for the Portfolios of Community Services, Children and Aboriginal Affairs. She is also the Manager of Opposition Business in the Legislative Council, and is a member of the Legislation Committee of the Legislative Council. In 2007 she was reelected as Deputy Leader of the Legislative Council for the Opposition. But after continuous disagreements with Opposition Leader Ted Baillieu both Phillip Davis and Andrea Coote resigned from their Leadership and Shadow Cabinet positions in favour of returning to the backbench of the Legislative Council. After the election of the Baillieu Liberal Government in 2010, Coote was appointed Parliamentary Secretary for Families and Community Services, assisting Mary Wooldrige in the first Baillieu Ministry.

Coote was not nominated for the election held on 29 November 2014 choosing to retire from parliament.
