= Reg Macey =

Australian politician (1936–2024)

Reg Macey (9 December 1936 – 30 January 2024) was an Australian politician.

== Life and career ==
Macey was born in Melbourne to Reginald George Gordon and Nelly Gwendoline Macey, and trained as a teacher. He taught in technical Schools from 1957 until 1968. While on a teaching scholarship, he taught part-time at a primary School in 1969 and again in 1972. In his other teaching years, he was seconded to the Victoria Police, and was an education officer there for 12 years. On 18 May 1963, he married Patricia Anne Martin, with whom he had three children: Leah, Martina, and Keiran. Their marriage was dissolved in 1987 and, on 29 October 1988, Macey married Maureen Griffiths, with whom he had a son, Griffith Macey. The couple separated in 2004. Macey had a commitment ceremony to Chutikarn Pinnaimueang in Phuket in 2005 and supported her 2 children.

Macey was a commissioner of the Melbourne and Metropolitan Board of Works from 1974 to 1978, and area commissioner from 1978 to 1981 and 1984 to 1985. He was a South Melbourne City Councillor from 1973 to 1981 and from 1982 to 1985, serving as mayor from 1977 to 1978 and 1978 to 1979. In 1985, he was elected to the Victorian Legislative Council as a Liberal, representing Monash Province. He held his seat until 1992, when he resigned.

Macey resigned from the Liberal Party in 2004 because he believed it had moved too far to the right. He claimed that the Liberals had abandoned Sir Robert Menzies' ideal of an Australian nation in which "every family is enabled to live in, and preferably to own, a comfortable home at reasonable cost and with adequate community amenities," as articulated in his 1945 Liberal Party constitution. He said the critical turning point was when Peter Costello, the Treasurer in the then federal Coalition Government, ignored a Productivity Commission recommendation from an inquiry which Costello had commissioned.

Concerned about the ability of people's adult children to become first home owners, Macey founded the Australian Affordable Housing Party in 2013 and became its first President. In February 2018, the party announced on Facebook that Macey had been replaced as president by the party's candidate at the 2017 Bennelong by-election, Anthony Ziebell.

On 30 January 2024, Macey died in Phuket, Thailand where he lived with his defacto wife. He was 87. Ref Death notice
