= Philip Davis (Australian politician) =

Australian politician (born 1952)

Philip Davis MLC

Member of the Victorian Legislative Council
- In office 3 October 1992 – 2 February 2014

Opposition Leader of the Victorian Legislative Council
- In office December 2002 – February 2008
- Succeeded by: David Davis

Personal details
- Born: 7 December 1952 (age 73) Maffra, Victoria
- Party: Liberal Party
- Occupation: Farmer

Philip Rivers Davis (born 7 December 1952) is a retired Australian politician. He was a Liberal member of the Victorian Legislative Council since October 1992, representing Gippsland Province until 2006 and the Eastern Victoria Region since. He was Leader of the Opposition in the Legislative Council from December 2002 to February 2008, and was a shadow minister from 1999 to February 2008.

He was first elected to the Victorian Parliament in 1992, in the seat that was then called Gippsland Province. He was re-elected in 1999. When the electoral boundaries changed and the seat became Eastern Victoria, he contested the seat and won in 2006 and was re-elected in 2010.

Davis has always had a strong interest in agriculture, graduating from Marcus Oldham Farm Management College in his early years before working as a jackaroo, property manager and running his own farming operations at Giffard, between Seaspray and Woodside.

Davis was heavily involved in the Victorian Farmers Federation in various roles and was a member of the Wool Council of Australia. Davis has also been involved with the Sale Rotary Club, the Gippsland Lakes Management Council, the Gippsland Base Hospital Board and the Gippsland Grammar Foundation.

In the Parliament, Davis has held various roles of responsibility including serving as the Kennett Government's Parliamentary Secretary for Natural Resources from 1996 to 1999 and while in Opposition he held the Shadow Portfolios of Agriculture, Natural Resources, Ports, Education, State Development, Energy & Resources, Country Victoria, Education, Finance and Manufacturing, Exports & Trade.

Davis was also the Leader of the Opposition in the Legislative Council between December 2002 and February 2008.

Davis retired from politics on 2 February 2014.
