= Thomas Brennan (Victorian state politician) =

Australian politician

Thomas William Brennan (7 April 1900 – 29 October 1966) was an Australian politician.

Born in Surrey Hills to labourer Patrick William Brennan and Kate Kealy, he attended school in Carlton and at St Joseph's CBC North Melbourne in 1915. Brennan became a Second Lieutenant in his schools Cadet Company and obtained his Leaving Certificate while there in 1919. After leaving school he moved on to the University of Melbourne where he studied law on a part-time basis.

He became a political journalist, having joined the Labor Party (ALP) around 1925 and was the editor of The Tribune, a weekly Catholic newspaper, for two years. He was admitted as a solicitor in 1935, and led classes in English and Public Speaking at the Victorian Labor College from 1941 to 1956.

From 1945 to 1955 he was on the state executive of the ALP, serving as president from 1950 to 1951 and as a Victorian MLC for Monash Province from 1952, but in 1955 he was part of the split that formed the Australian Labor Party (Anti-Communist), which became the Democratic Labor Party (DLP). He lost his State seat in 1958 and continued to contest elections for the DLP until 1964.
