= Sustainable Australia Party =

Sustainable Australia Party Affordable Housing Now – Sustainable Australia Party
- Abbreviation: SAP
- Founder: William Bourke
- Founded: 2010 (as Sustainable Population Party)
- Registered: 23 September 2010; 16 years ago
- Headquarters: Crows Nest, New South Wales, Australia
- Ideology: Anti-corruption; Environmentalism; Sustainable development
- Colors: Green and navy blue
- Slogan: #EnvironmentFirst
- House of Representatives: 0 / 151
- Senate: 0 / 76
- Campbelltown City Council: 1 / 15
- Victoria Park Town Council: 1 / 8

Website
- www.sustainableaustralia.org.au

The Sustainable Australia Party (SAP), officially registered as Affordable Housing Now – Sustainable Australia Party, is a political party in Australia that was formed in 2010.

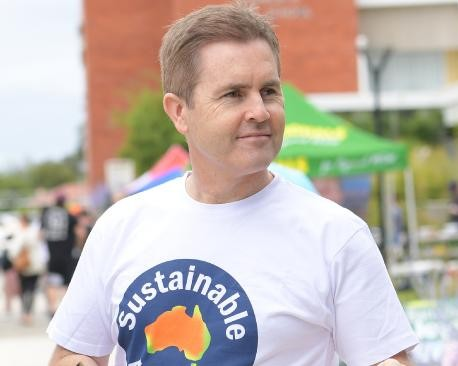
SAP Founder William Bourke

== History ==
=== Federal and state registrations ===
The party has been registered federally since 2010. In 2016 it also registered in the Australian Capital Territory, and contested the 2016 Australian Capital Election. In 2018 it also registered in Victoria for the 2018 state election and NSW for the 2019 state election.

=== Foundation issue and evolution ===
In 2010 the party opposed Kevin Rudd's support for a "big Australia", saying that a large population would be "disastrous", is "way beyond [Australia's] long-term carrying capacity", and that "population growth is not inevitable". The party claims that "'stable population' policies would mean a more sustainable 26 million at 2050, not the Labor/Liberal 'big Australia' plan for 36 million and rising."

Sustainable Australia Party used to be called the Sustainable Population Party. 'Sustainable Australia' was registered with the Australian Electoral Commission on 18 January 2016, accompanied by a broader policy platform. The party missed out on registration for the 2010 federal election by several days, but leader William Bourke ran unsuccessfully for the Senate in New South Wales on an independent ticket with poet Mark O'Connor. The party was registered shortly after the election, on 23 September 2010.

The party was registered as "Stable Population Party of Australia", but on 28 February 2014 the Australian Electoral Commission approved a name-change to the "Sustainable Population Party". On 19 January 2016, the AEC approved a further name change to "#Sustainable Australia" (including a hash symbol). It was later registered as the Sustainable Australia Party – Stop Overdevelopment / Corruption.

The party ran at least two Senate candidates in every state and territory in the 2013 Australian federal election and many local candidates also. Timothy Lawrence was the candidate for Australian Stable Population Party in the 2014 Griffith by-election, arising from the resignation of Kevin Rudd. Lawrence received 666 votes, 0.86% of the primary vote. The party also contested the April 2014 re-run in Western Australia of the 2013 federal Senate elections. The party endorsed Angela Smith, an environmental scientist and a local candidate, for the 2015 Canning by-election. In September 2015 the party campaigned on a number of issues including education, paid jobs, infrastructure, health care, renewable energy and housing affordability.

In the 2015 North Sydney by-election its candidate and founder William Bourke received 2,189 votes, representing 2.88% of the primary votes.

The party has been involved in a preference harvesting scheme organised by Glenn Druery's Minor Party Alliance.

In the 2016 federal election, Sustainable Australia was led temporarily by ex-Labor Minister for Sustainability, Andrew McNamara. The party fielded two senate candidates in each of the Australian Capital Territory, New South Wales, Queensland and Victoria, as well as a candidate in the Division of Sydney for the House of Representatives, where Kris Spike received 605 votes, 0.69% of the votes.

The party received media attention in 2017 when Australian entrepreneur Dick Smith joined the party.

Sustainable Australia won its first parliamentary seat in the 2018 Victorian state election. The party received 1.32% of the primary vote in the Southern Metropolitan Region. However, after favourable preference deals with other parties Clifford Hayes won the 5th Legislative Council seat in Southern Metropolitan Region for the party.

In the 2020 federal Groom by-election SAP's candidate Sandra Jephcott received 6,716 votes, representing 7.8% of the primary votes.

At the 2021 NSW local government elections, SAP's North Sydney Council candidates William Bourke and Georgia Lamb were elected as Councillors with 13.1% and 10.7% of the primary vote in their respective wards. William Bourke was subsequently elected Deputy Mayor by a vote of all North Sydney Councillors.

In 2023, SAP's Daniel Minson was elected to Victoria Park Town Council in Western Australia.

In 2024, the party lost both of its councillors in North Sydney, but gained a seat in Campbelltown.

== Policies ==
=== Victoria ===
Sustainable Australia's Victorian MP Clifford Hayes has campaigned for a sustainable environment and called for a container deposit scheme to be introduced in Victoria to reduce waste and stop rubbish going into landfill.

Following this, Hayes also campaigned for a large environmental reserve in Melbourne's west to protect endangered species and ecosystems.

Hayes also spoke strongly in favour of boosting Victoria's legislated renewable energy target, or VRET, to 50 per cent by 2030 in that state parliament's upper house, saying we have been in the middle of a climate crisis for a long term and we need to take action across all sectors from energy to transport, construction and more.

In the 2018 Victorian state election, policies that Sustainable Australia ran on included:

- Campaigning against rapid population growth
- Campaigning for tighter residential planning laws
- Scaling back Australia's migration rate to about 70,000 people a year, while preserving refugee intakes at 14,000 to 20,000.
- Giving "real power to local communities in planning decisions"
- Increasing charges to developers when land is rezoned for housing.

=== Federal and state policies ===
- At the Federal level of government, a policy is to reduce the country's immigration intake, from record high levels of over 200,000 to 70,000 people per annum.
- Target a population in Australia of under 30 million "through to and beyond 2050".
- Setup an independent Federal Commission to monitor and expose corruption.
- On housing affordability, Sustainable Australia bases its solutions on restricting foreign ownership of residential property, cutting immigration, and on taxation measures (such as phasing out the 50% Capital Gains Tax discount on residential investment property and abolishing negative gearing on residential investment property). The party believes that "with a sustainable environment and much more stable population, you can simultaneously achieve affordable housing (due to less buyer demand) and better planning (to stop over-development)".
- On the environment, the party advocates for reducing greenhouse gas emissions to 80% below year 2000 levels by 2050, or cutting further if possible.
- Cut the cost of public transportation by at least half and expand train and/or bus networks.
- The establishment of a national job guarantee.
- The implementation of a universal basic income (UBI) or citizen's dividend of minimum "$500+ per week ($26,000 per annum, indexed from 2021)" to all Australians as a method of poverty prevention.

== Electoral results ==
=== Federal ===
Election year	House of Representatives				Senate				Name of party (at time of poll)
Election year	Votes (#)	Votes (%)	Seats	+/–	Votes (#)	Votes (%)	Seats	+/–	Name of party (at time of poll)
2013	3,954	0.03	0 / 150	▲	12,671	0.09 (#30)	0 / 76	▲	Stable Population Party
2014 special	N/A (Note: This election was only for Senate candidates in Western Australia)				3,063	0.24 (#25)	0 / 76	▲	Sustainable Population Party
2016	606	0.00	0 / 150	▼	26,341	0.19 (#30)	0 / 76	▲	Sustainable Australia Party
2019	35,618	0.25	0 / 151	▲	59,265	0.41 (#16)	0 / 76	▲	Sustainable Australia Party
2022	3,866	0.03	0 / 151	▼	78,181	0.52 (#11)	0 / 76	▲	Sustainable Australia Party
2025	Did not contest				58,090	0.37 (#20)	0 / 76	▼	Sustainable Australia Party

=== State ===
Election year	Lower House				Upper House			
Election year	Votes (#)	Votes (%)	Seats	+/–	Votes (#)	Votes (%)	Seats	+/–
2018 Victoria	8,183	0.23	0 / 88	▲	29,866	0.83	1 / 40	▲1
2022 Victoria			0 / 88		17,537	0.47	0 / 40	▼1
2019 NSW	69,831	1.53	0 / 93	▲	65,102	1.46	0 / 42	▲
2023 NSW	103,710	2.10	0 / 93	▲	42,902	0.85	0 / 42	▲
2020 ACT	4,593	1.71	0 / 25	▲	N/A (Note: The ACT has a Unicameral parliament)			
2021 WA	1,356	0.1	0 / 59	▲	4,405	0.31	0 / 36	▲
2025 WA			0 / 59		16,732	1.08	0 / 36	▲
2022 SA	N/A (Note: The party did not contest any seats in the House of Assembly)		0 / 47	Steady	4,003	0.36	0 / 22	▲

== Elected representatives ==
=== State ===
==== Victoria ====
- Clifford Hayes – Victorian Legislative Council (2018–2022)

=== Local ===
==== New South Wales ====
- Cameron McEwan – Campbelltown City Council (2024–present)
- William Bourke – North Sydney Council (2021–2024)
- Georgia Lamb – North Sydney Council (2021–2024)

==== Western Australia ====
- Daniel Minson – Victoria Park Town Council (2024–present)

== See also ==
- List of political parties in Australia
