= Peter Hall (politician) =

Australian politician

The Honourable Peter Hall MLC

Minister for Higher Education and Skills; the Teaching Profession
- In office December 2010 – 17 March 2014

Member of the Victorian Parliament for Eastern Victoria
- In office 25 November 2006 – 17 March 2014

Member of the Victorian Parliament for Gippsland Province
- In office 1 October 1988 – 24 November 2006

Personal details
- Born: 27 May 1952 (age 74) Castlemaine, Victoria
- Party: The Nationals
- Education: Monash University
- Occupation: Teacher

Peter Ronald Hall (born 27 May 1952) is an Australian retired politician. He was a National member of the Victorian Legislative Council from 1988 to 2014, representing Gippsland Province (1988–2006) and the Eastern Victoria Region (2006–2014).

== Early life and education ==
Hall was born and raised in Castlemaine, Victoria. He graduated from Castlemaine High School in 1969 and moved to Melbourne to attend university. He graduated from Monash University in 1972 with a Bachelor of Arts and completed a Diploma of Education the following year.

== Football career ==
Hall showed promise as an Australian rules football player as a young person, being the best and fairest for the Castlemaine Football Club in 1969, at only 17 years of age. While studying teaching at Monash University in Melbourne, Hall made his debut for the Carlton Football Club in what was then the Victorian Football League (now named the Australian Football League). He went on to play 37 senior games between 1971 and 1974. However, he retired from top-grade football at the end of the 1974 season, moving to Traralgon in 1975 to take up a full-time secondary teaching position.

Over the next fourteen years, Hall continued to teach in Traralgon while also being the playing coach of his local football club. He twice won the league's best and fairest award, and coached both Traralgon and Morwell to premierships. Both of these careers were to end, however, when Hall was elected to the safe National seat of Gippsland Province at the 1988 state election.

== Political career ==
Hall was given little responsibility in his first term in office, but after being re-elected in 1996, he was made Deputy President of the Legislative Council and Chairman of the Ministerial Rural Health Advisory Group. When the Liberal–National coalition lost government in 1999, Hall became the Deputy Leader of the National Party in the Legislative Council and Shadow Minister for Sport and Recreation, Youth and Affairs.

However, this was to again change in 2000, when the now-opposition coalition fractured. This meant that the Victorian division of the National Party was now the only one anywhere in the country to be separate from the Liberal Party. Hall subsequently lost his three shadow ministries, but instead became the party's spokesperson for education, tertiary education, secondary education, primary education, preschools, adult learning, e learning resources and the environment. The following year, he was again promoted, and was made Leader of the National Party in the Legislative Council.

The 2002 election saw a major landslide victory for the Labor government at the expense of both the Liberal and National Parties. There was a swing to Labor in almost every seat in the state, with numerous MPs losing their seats. Hall, however, was the only exception in the Legislative Council, slightly improving his vote despite the party's poor statewide result. After the election, he maintained his position as leader in the Legislative Council, despite the sacking of his Liberal counterpart, Bill Forwood.

While usually orthodox in his support for National Party policies, Hall was one of a group of prominent National Party figures – including key senators Barnaby Joyce and Fiona Nash to express concern about the federal party's support for the policy of voluntary student unionism. Hall in particular expressed concern about the effect it would have on rural universities and towns within his electorate, most notably surrounding the Churchill campus of Monash University. Hall also attracted much displeasure within the National Party's conservative base after he voted for the Abortion Law Reform Act and a failed euthanasia bill in 2008.

After the Bracks Labor Government reformed the Legislative Council prior to the 2006 election, the new quota system was thought to enhance the chances of minor parties such as the Greens and Family First winning seats. However, a statewide swing to the National Party, including localised gains in Gippsland lower house electorates, the running of candidates in new seats such as Gembrook and Hastings, and adroit preference deals, saw Hall win the final Eastern Region seat ahead of the Greens candidate.

When the Liberal/National Coalition won the 2010 Victorian state election, Hall was commissioned as Minister for Higher Education and Skills, and Minister for the Teaching Profession. In May 2012 he caused some surprise, and anger within the government, by declaring in a letter to leaders of TAFE institutions his "shock, incredulity, disbelief and anger" at the big funding cuts to the sector in the state budget. This later led to speculation that he would be dropped from the state cabinet in a reshuffle.

On 24 February 2014, Hall announced he would not be contesting the 2014 state election, and would retire after 25 years in politics. On 12 March, Hall announced that he would be resigning from politics nine months before the election, and would deliver his valedictory speech on 13 March.
