= Charles Hider =

Australian politician (born 1935)

Charles Allen Moir Hider (born 6 November 1935) is an Australian politician.

Hider was born in Melbourne to John Jubilee Hider and Marjorie Louise Moir, and attended Ivanhoe Grammar School and the University of Melbourne, graduating with a Bachelor of Law. He became a solicitor in 1959. On 2 December 1963, he married Heather Margaret Turnbull (a daughter of Keith Turnbull) with whom he had three children. They were later divorced, and on 4 August 1982 he married Anne Elizabeth Lahey.

In 1970, Hider was elected as a Liberal to the Victorian Legislative Council representing Monash Province, holding the seat until he retired in 1979. After leaving politics he became Chairman of Grants Patch Mining Ltd (1981–90), Chairman of Ballarat Consolidated Gold Ltd (1982–98) and chairman and Director of Geo2 Ltd (1986–2000).
