= Results of the 2014 Victorian state election (Legislative Assembly) =

Australian state election results

Victorian state election, 29 November 2014 Legislative Assembly << 2010–2018 >>
Enrolled voters	3,806,301				
Votes cast	3,540,140		Turnout	93.01	+0.05
Informal votes	184,815		Informal	5.22	+0.26
Summary of votes by party
Party	Primary votes	%	Swing	Seats	Change
Labor	1,278,322	38.10	+1.84	47	+4*
Liberal	1,223,474	36.46	−1.57	30	−5
Greens	385,190	11.48	+0.27	2	+2
National	185,619	5.53	−1.21	8	−2
Country Alliance	43,038	1.28	−0.07	0	±0
Family First	37,194	1.11	−1.18	0	±0
Christians	26,545	0.79	+0.79	0	±0
Rise Up Australia	20,795	0.62	+0.62	0	±0
Voice for the West	16,584	0.49	+0.49	0	±0
Sex Party	8,930	0.27	−0.28	0	±0
Animal Justice	7,778	0.23	+0.23	0	±0
Democratic Labor	2,799	0.08	−0.81	0	±0
Shooters and Fishers	2,622	0.08	+0.08	0	±0
Socialist Alliance	1,728	0.05	−0.00	0	±0
People Power Victoria	1,375	0.04	+0.04	0	±0
The Basics Rock 'n' Roll	1,043	0.03	+0.03	0	±0
Independent	112,289	3.35	+0.74	1	+1
Total	3,355,325			88	
Two-party-preferred
Labor	1,745,020	51.99	+3.57		
Liberal/National	1,611,507	48.01	−3.57		
* ^{Labor also retained four of the five Labor seats which were made notionally Liberal by the 2013 redistribution.}

This is a list of electoral district results for the Victorian 2014 election for the Legislative Assembly.

== Results by electoral district ==
=== Albert Park ===
2014 Victorian state election: Albert Park
Party	Candidate	Votes	%	±%
Liberal	Shannon Eeles	15,177	41.5	+1.7
Labor	Martin Foley	11,826	32.3	+1.3
Greens	David Collis	6,134	16.8	−0.1
Independent	Tex Perkins	1,614	4.4	+4.4
Sex Party	James Hurley	1,263	3.5	−0.1
Stable Population	Steven Armstrong	289	0.8	+0.8
Family First	Deborah Geyer	273	0.7	0.0
Total formal votes		36,576	95.9	−0.4
Informal votes		1,575	4.1	+0.4
Turnout		38,151	88.4	+0.2
Two-party-preferred result
Labor	Martin Foley	19,370	53.0	+2.1
Liberal	Shannon Eeles	17,206	47.0	−2.1
Labor hold		Swing	+2.1	

=== Altona ===
2014 Victorian state election: Altona
Party	Candidate	Votes	%	±%
Labor	Jill Hennessy	21,862	52.0	+0.9
Liberal	Nihal Samara	13,235	31.5	−1.9
Greens	Chris De Bono	4,220	10.0	−0.4
Christians	Anthony O'Neill	1,085	2.6	+2.6
Voice for the West	Jemal Hiabu	996	2.4	+2.4
Independent	Brijender Nain	687	1.6	+1.6
Total formal votes		42,085	94.6	−0.1
Informal votes		2,425	5.4	+0.1
Turnout		44,510	92.6	+3.4
Two-party-preferred result
Labor	Jill Hennessy	26,366	62.6	+0.2
Liberal	Nihal Samara	15,777	37.4	−0.2
Labor hold		Swing	+0.2	

=== Bass ===
2014 Victorian state election: Bass
Party	Candidate	Votes	%	±%
Liberal	Brian Paynter	18,008	45.3	−10.2
Labor	Sanjay Nathan	11,659	29.4	+0.6
Independent	Clare Le Serve	4,289	10.8	+10.8
Greens	Ross Fairhurst	3,613	9.1	−2.6
Country Alliance	David Amor	969	2.4	−0.9
Christians	Paul Reid	651	1.6	+1.6
Rise Up Australia	Angela Dorian	524	1.3	+1.3
Total formal votes		39,713	94.6	−0.7
Informal votes		2,272	5.4	+0.7
Turnout		41,985	94.4	+6.1
Two-party-preferred result
Liberal	Brian Paynter	21,664	54.6	−7.8
Labor	Sanjay Nathan	18,049	45.4	+7.8
Liberal hold		Swing	−7.8	

=== Bayswater ===
2014 Victorian state election: Bayswater
Party	Candidate	Votes	%	±%
Liberal	Heidi Victoria	18,811	49.3	−0.9
Labor	Tony Dib	12,927	33.9	+1.0
Greens	James Tennant	3,355	8.8	−0.1
Animal Justice	Robert Smyth	1,313	3.4	+3.4
Christians	Tristan Conway	785	2.1	+2.1
Country Alliance	Jeremy Cass	583	1.5	+1.0
Independent	John Carbonari	385	1.0	+1.0
Total formal votes		38,159	94.9	−0.4
Informal votes		2,040	5.1	+0.4
Turnout		40,199	94.1	+1.1
Two-party-preferred result
Liberal	Heidi Victoria	20,854	54.6	−2.1
Labor	Tony Dib	17,323	45.4	+2.1
Liberal hold		Swing	−2.1	

=== Bellarine ===
2014 Victorian state election: Bellarine
Party	Candidate	Votes	%	±%
Labor	Lisa Neville	16,818	43.6	+6.1
Liberal	Ron Nelson	15,678	40.6	−6.0
Greens	Brenton Peake	3,639	9.4	+0.6
Sex Party	Rhiannon Hunter	631	1.6	+1.6
Family First	Robert Keenan	572	1.5	−0.5
Shooters and Fishers	Joshua Williams	490	1.3	+1.3
Country Alliance	John Irvine	436	1.1	−0.3
Rise Up Australia	Christopher Dawson	178	0.5	+0.5
Independent	Gus Kacinskas	169	0.4	+0.4
Total formal votes		38,611	95.2	−0.0
Informal votes		1,964	4.8	+0.0
Turnout		40,575	95.4	+5.8
Two-party-preferred result
Labor	Lisa Neville	21,174	54.8	+7.3
Liberal	Ron Nelson	17,437	45.2	−7.3
Labor gain from Liberal		Swing	+7.3	

=== Benambra ===
2014 Victorian state election: Benambra
Party	Candidate	Votes	%	±%
Liberal	Bill Tilley	21,430	54.6	+6.0
Labor	Jennifer Podesta	12,273	31.3	+7.7
Greens	Richard Wellard	3,568	9.1	−1.7
Country Alliance	Philip Rourke	1,973	5.0	−1.9
Total formal votes		39,244	95.5	−0.3
Informal votes		1,863	4.5	+0.3
Turnout		41,107	92.9	+0.7
Two-party-preferred result
Liberal	Bill Tilley	23,452	59.7	−6.3
Labor	Jennifer Podesta	15,848	40.3	+6.3
Liberal hold		Swing	−6.3	

=== Bendigo East ===
2014 Victorian state election: Bendigo East
Party	Candidate	Votes	%	±%
Labor	Jacinta Allan	18,651	46.3	+3.1
Liberal	Greg Bickley	16,492	40.9	+6.9
Greens	Jennifer Alden	2,935	7.3	+1.0
Family First	Glenis Bradshaw	963	2.4	+1.1
Country Alliance	Cameron Dowling	714	1.8	−1.7
Rise Up Australia	Lynette Bell	550	1.4	+1.4
Total formal votes		40,305	96.5	+1.2
Informal votes		1,456	3.5	−1.2
Turnout		41,761	95.0	+2.3
Two-party-preferred result
Labor	Jacinta Allan	22,187	55.0	+1.9
Liberal	Greg Bickley	18,118	45.0	−1.9
Labor hold		Swing	+1.9	

=== Bendigo West ===
2014 Victorian state election: Bendigo West
Party	Candidate	Votes	%	±%
Labor	Maree Edwards	18,247	47.9	+8.2
Liberal	Michael Langdon	12,328	32.3	+12.4
Greens	John Brownstein	4,482	11.8	+1.0
Family First	Amanda Moskalewicz	1,311	3.4	+1.6
Country Alliance	Elise Chapman	1,071	2.8	−0.8
Rise Up Australia	Sandra Caddy	692	1.8	+1.8
Total formal votes		38,131	95.6	+1.0
Informal votes		1,753	4.4	−1.0
Turnout		39,884	93.8	+2.0
Two-party-preferred result
Labor	Maree Edwards	23,702	62.2	+4.0
Liberal	Michael Langdon	14,419	37.8	−4.0
Labor hold		Swing	+4.0	

=== Bentleigh ===
2014 Victorian state election: Bentleigh
Party	Candidate	Votes	%	±%
Liberal	Elizabeth Miller	16,669	45.9	−1.4
Labor	Nick Staikos	14,025	38.6	+0.1
Greens	Sean Mulcahy	3,842	10.6	−0.4
Sex Party	Ross McCawley	688	1.9	+1.9
Family First	David Clark	451	1.2	+0.2
Independent	Chandra Ojha	271	0.7	+0.7
People Power Victoria	Sofia Telemzouguer	260	0.7	+0.7
Rise Up Australia	Kelley Moldovan	124	0.3	+0.3
Total formal votes		36,330	94.8	−0.9
Informal votes		2,010	5.2	+0.9
Turnout		38,340	93.6	+2.6
Two-party-preferred result
Labor	Nick Staikos	18,449	50.8	+1.7
Liberal	Elizabeth Miller	17,881	49.2	−1.7
Labor gain from Liberal		Swing	+1.7	

=== Box Hill ===
2014 Victorian state election: Box Hill
Party	Candidate	Votes	%	±%
Liberal	Robert Clark	19,944	51.1	−2.4
Labor	Stefanie Perri	11,964	30.7	+1.8
Greens	Bill Pemberton	5,649	14.5	+0.3
Christians	Frank Reale	978	2.5	+2.5
Independent	Geoffrey Stokie	470	1.2	+1.2
Total formal votes		39,005	96.2	−0.5
Informal votes		1,520	3.8	+0.5
Turnout		40,525	93.4	−0.4
Two-party-preferred result
Liberal	Robert Clark	21,744	55.7	−3.7
Labor	Stefanie Perri	17,298	44.3	+3.7
Liberal hold		Swing	−3.7	

=== Brighton ===
2014 Victorian state election: Brighton
Party	Candidate	Votes	%	±%
Liberal	Louise Asher	21,145	55.5	−3.0
Labor	Louise Crawford	8,973	23.6	+3.5
Greens	Margaret Beavis	6,619	17.4	+0.1
Independent	Jane Touzeau	1,350	3.5	+3.5
Total formal votes		38,087	96.4	−0.1
Informal votes		1,425	3.6	+0.1
Turnout		39,512	92.1	−0.1
Two-party-preferred result
Liberal	Louise Asher	22,777	59.8	−4.6
Labor	Louise Crawford	15,330	40.2	+4.6
Liberal hold		Swing	−4.6	

=== Broadmeadows ===
2014 Victorian state election: Broadmeadows
Party	Candidate	Votes	%	±%
Labor	Frank McGuire	21,584	64.2	+3.4
Liberal	Evren Onder	5,797	17.2	−8.7
Family First	Wayne Knight	2,221	6.6	+5.4
Greens	Jaime De Loma-Osorio Ricon	1,884	5.6	−2.5
Voice for the West	Mohamed Hassan	1,642	4.9	+4.9
Independent	John Rinaldi	508	1.5	+1.5
Total formal votes		33,636	91.5	−0.8
Informal votes		3,133	8.5	+0.8
Turnout		36,769	88.1	−2.2
Two-party-preferred result
Labor	Frank McGuire	26,126	77.8	+7.8
Liberal	Evren Onder	7,442	22.2	−7.8
Labor hold		Swing	+7.8	

=== Brunswick ===
2014 Victorian state election: Brunswick
Party	Candidate	Votes	%	±%
Greens	Tim Read	16,001	39.6	+9.5
Labor	Jane Garrett	15,318	38.0	+1.9
Liberal	Giuseppe Vellotti	6,554	16.2	−0.9
Animal Justice	Ward Young	714	1.8	+1.8
People Power Victoria	Stella Kariofyllidis	670	1.7	+1.7
Save The Planet	Dean O'Callaghan	491	1.2	+1.2
Family First	Frank Giurleo	396	1.0	+1.0
Christians	Babar Peters	214	0.5	+0.5
Total formal votes		40,358	95.1	+0.3
Informal votes		2,089	4.9	−0.3
Turnout		42,447	90.4	+2.7
Notional two-party-preferred count
Labor	Jane Garrett	32,042	79.4	+4.3
Liberal	Giuseppe Vellotti	8,315	20.6	−4.3
Two-candidate-preferred result
Labor	Jane Garrett	21,075	52.2	−1.4
Greens	Tim Read	19,283	47.8	+1.4
Labor hold		Swing	−1.4	

=== Bulleen ===
2014 Victorian state election: Bulleen
Party	Candidate	Votes	%	±%
Liberal	Matthew Guy	21,983	56.2	−3.7
Labor	Adam Rundell	11,859	30.3	+3.4
Greens	Ben Cronly	3,824	9.8	+0.9
Christians	Eleni Arapoglou	1,452	3.7	+3.7
Total formal votes		39,118	95.1	−0.0
Informal votes		2,018	4.9	+0.0
Turnout		41,136	93.3	+0.3
Two-party-preferred result
Liberal	Matthew Guy	23,699	60.6	−4.5
Labor	Adam Rundell	15,438	39.4	+4.5
Liberal hold		Swing	−4.5	

=== Bundoora ===
2014 Victorian state election: Bundoora
Party	Candidate	Votes	%	±%
Labor	Colin Brooks	18,628	52.7	+2.6
Liberal	Amita Gill	11,822	33.4	−0.1
Greens	Clement Stanyon	3,592	10.2	+1.0
Family First	James Widdowson	1,338	3.8	+0.3
Total formal votes		35,380	95.5	+1.0
Informal votes		1,682	4.5	−1.0
Turnout		37,062	94.0	+1.3
Two-party-preferred result
Labor	Colin Brooks	22,035	62.2	+1.3
Liberal	Amita Gill	13,376	37.8	−1.3
Labor hold		Swing	+1.3	

=== Buninyong ===
2014 Victorian state election: Buninyong
Party	Candidate	Votes	%	±%
Labor	Geoff Howard	15,984	43.5	+2.7
Liberal	Ben Taylor	12,829	35.0	−7.5
Greens	Tony Goodfellow	4,017	10.9	−0.4
National	Sonia Smith	2,301	6.3	+5.5
Family First	Keith Geyer	950	2.6	−0.7
Country Alliance	James Keays	622	1.7	+0.6
Total formal votes		36,703	95.2	−0.1
Informal votes		1,852	4.8	+0.1
Turnout		38,555	94.3	+5.4
Two-party-preferred result
Labor	Geoff Howard	20,697	56.4	+4.8
Liberal	Ben Taylor	16,006	43.6	−4.8
Labor hold		Swing	+4.8	

=== Burwood ===
2014 Victorian state election: Burwood
Party	Candidate	Votes	%	±%
Liberal	Graham Watt	18,902	50.1	−0.1
Labor	Gavin Ryan	12,995	34.4	+1.5
Greens	Beck Stuart	4,904	13.0	+1.1
Independent	Peter Campbell	960	2.5	+2.5
Total formal votes		37,761	96.5	−0.2
Informal votes		1,357	3.5	+0.2
Turnout		39,118	93.4	+0.6
Two-party-preferred result
Liberal	Graham Watt	20,079	53.2	−3.1
Labor	Gavin Ryan	17,688	46.8	+3.1
Liberal hold		Swing	−3.1	

=== Carrum ===
2014 Victorian state election: Carrum
Party	Candidate	Votes	%	±%
Liberal	Donna Bauer	17,802	45.2	+1.6
Labor	Sonya Kilkenny	16,645	42.2	+2.0
Greens	Henry Kelsall	2,989	7.6	−1.6
Family First	Richard Vernay	1,281	3.2	+0.6
Rise Up Australia	Margaret Quinn	708	1.8	+1.8
Total formal votes		39,425	94.9	+0.3
Informal votes		2,126	5.1	−0.3
Turnout		41,551	93.2	+2.9
Two-party-preferred result
Labor	Sonya Kilkenny	19,998	50.7	+1.0
Liberal	Donna Bauer	19,427	49.3	−1.0
Labor gain from Liberal		Swing	+1.0	

=== Caulfield ===
2014 Victorian state election: Caulfield
Party	Candidate	Votes	%	±%
Liberal	David Southwick	18,860	51.7	−4.0
Labor	Josh Burns	10,849	29.7	+5.0
Greens	Tim Baxter	5,940	16.3	−0.4
Independent	John Myers	488	1.3	+1.3
Rise Up Australia	Teresa Horvath	345	0.9	+0.9
Total formal votes		36,482	95.8	−0.6
Informal votes		1,589	4.2	+0.6
Turnout		38,071	90.7	−1.5
Two-party-preferred result
Liberal	David Southwick	20,034	54.9	−4.9
Labor	Josh Burns	16,471	45.1	+4.9
Liberal hold		Swing	−4.9	

=== Clarinda ===
2014 Victorian state election: Clarinda
Party	Candidate	Votes	%	±%
Labor	Hong Lim	20,029	53.3	+1.0
Liberal	Gandhi Bevinakoppa	10,965	29.2	−4.1
Greens	James Talbot-Kamoen	4,239	11.3	+2.7
Rise Up Australia	Melanie Vassiliou	1,340	3.6	+3.6
Independent	James Marinis	1,034	2.7	+2.7
Total formal votes		37,700	93.9	−0.0
Informal votes		2,466	6.1	+0.0
Turnout		40,166	91.9	+0.4
Two-party-preferred result
Labor	Hong Lim	24,713	65.8	+3.4
Liberal	Gandhi Bevinakoppa	12,833	34.2	−3.4
Labor hold		Swing	+3.4	

=== Cranbourne ===
2014 Victorian state election: Cranbourne
Party	Candidate	Votes	%	±%
Labor	Jude Perera	17,365	43.4	+1.4
Liberal	Geoff Ablett	16,536	41.3	+0.9
Greens	Nagaraj Nayak	1,668	4.2	−2.7
Sex Party	Laith Graham	1,110	2.8	+2.6
Rise Up Australia	Jonathan Eli	995	2.5	+2.5
Family First	Pamela Keenan	979	2.4	−1.6
Independent	Rosemary Blake	824	2.1	+2.1
Christians	Rania Michael	560	1.4	+1.4
Total formal votes		40,037	93.4	−0.0
Informal votes		2,810	6.6	+0.0
Turnout		42,847	93.4	+10.9
Two-party-preferred result
Labor	Jude Perera	20,954	52.3	+1.3
Liberal	Geoff Ablett	19,083	47.7	−1.3
Labor hold		Swing	+1.3	

=== Croydon ===
2014 Victorian state election: Croydon
Party	Candidate	Votes	%	±%
Liberal	David Hodgett	19,797	53.7	−1.8
Labor	Lesley Fielding	11,352	30.8	+1.9
Greens	Jill Wild	3,273	8.9	+0.1
Christians	Mike Brown	1,033	2.8	+2.8
Country Alliance	Sarah Barclay	869	2.4	+2.4
Independent	Joel Martin	539	1.5	+1.5
Total formal votes		36,863	95.6	−0.2
Informal votes		1,699	4.4	+0.2
Turnout		38,562	94.7	+2.7
Two-party-preferred result
Liberal	David Hodgett	22,005	59.3	−2.9
Labor	Lesley Fielding	15,108	40.7	+2.9
Liberal hold		Swing	−2.9	

=== Dandenong ===
2014 Victorian state election: Dandenong
Party	Candidate	Votes	%	±%
Labor	Gabrielle Williams	17,891	52.8	+1.6
Liberal	Joanna Palatsides	9,809	29.0	−0.1
Greens	John Gulzari	2,611	7.7	−0.8
Family First	Noelle Walker	2,097	6.2	+1.7
Rise Up Australia	Carlton King	950	2.8	+2.8
Independent	Dale Key	500	1.5	+1.5
Total formal votes		33,858	91.7	−0.8
Informal votes		3,064	8.3	+0.8
Turnout		36,922	89.6	−0.6
Two-party-preferred result
Labor	Gabrielle Williams	21,389	62.9	−1.2
Liberal	Joanna Palatsides	12,628	37.1	+1.2
Labor hold		Swing	−1.2	

=== Eildon ===
2014 Victorian state election: Eildon
Party	Candidate	Votes	%	±%
Liberal	Cindy McLeish	16,070	43.4	+12.7
Labor	Sally Brennan	10,375	28.0	−0.5
Greens	Marie Sellstrom	4,323	11.7	+0.5
National	Jim Child	2,253	6.1	−9.3
Country Alliance	Jeff Leake	1,208	3.3	−1.6
Independent	Bruce Argyle	1,172	3.2	+3.2
Family First	David Prentice	883	2.4	+0.5
Independent	Jane Judd	723	2.0	+2.0
Total formal votes		37,007	94.8	−0.1
Informal votes		2,042	5.2	+0.1
Turnout		39,049	94.1	−2.3
Two-party-preferred result
Liberal	Cindy McLeish	19,934	53.8	−3.9
Labor	Sally Brennan	17,151	46.2	+3.9
Liberal hold		Swing	−3.9	

=== Eltham ===
2014 Victorian state election: Eltham
Party	Candidate	Votes	%	±%
Liberal	Steven Briffa	17,727	43.9	−0.9
Labor	Vicki Ward	16,374	40.6	+1.9
Greens	Liezl Shnookal	4,600	11.4	−1.5
Independent	Chris Byrne	555	1.4	+1.4
Family First	Janna Fenn	490	1.2	−0.7
Christians	Michael Janson	345	0.9	+0.9
Independent	Ryan Ebert	251	0.6	+0.6
Total formal votes		40,342	95.7	−0.2
Informal votes		1,808	4.3	+0.2
Turnout		42,150	94.9	+0.4
Two-party-preferred result
Labor	Vicki Ward	21,258	52.7	+1.9
Liberal	Steven Briffa	19,084	47.3	−1.9
Labor hold		Swing	+1.9	

=== Essendon ===
2014 Victorian state election: Essendon
Party	Candidate	Votes	%	±%
Labor	Danny Pearson	16,026	40.9	+2.8
Liberal	Fred Ackerman	14,052	35.9	+1.1
Greens	Ashley Waite	7,065	18.0	+0.1
Independent	Richard Lawrence	1,326	3.4	+3.4
Voice for the West	Mario Mendez	714	1.8	+1.8
Total formal votes		39,183	96.1	+0.1
Informal votes		1,605	3.9	−0.1
Turnout		40,788	92.4	+2.7
Two-party-preferred result
Labor	Danny Pearson	22,988	58.7	+4.3
Liberal	Fred Ackerman	16,195	41.3	−4.3
Labor hold		Swing	+4.3	

=== Euroa ===
2014 Victorian state election: Euroa
Party	Candidate	Votes	%	±%
National	Steph Ryan	14,494	35.3	−4.1
Labor	Clare Malcolm	11,428	27.9	+0.8
Liberal	Tony Schneider	10,454	25.5	+12.1
Greens	Simon Roberts	2,110	5.1	−0.8
Family First	Julie-Anne Winzer	1,307	3.2	+1.4
Country Alliance	Lisa Adams	1,238	3.0	−5.1
Total formal votes		41,031	95.3	−0.0
Informal votes		2,016	4.7	+0.0
Turnout		43,047	93.9	+4.5
Two-party-preferred result
National	Steph Ryan	26,451	64.5	+0.9
Labor	Clare Malcolm	14,580	35.5	−0.9
National hold		Swing	+0.9	

=== Evelyn ===
2014 Victorian state election: Evelyn
Party	Candidate	Votes	%	±%
Liberal	Christine Fyffe	19,258	53.5	−2.2
Labor	Peter Harris	11,588	32.2	+1.9
Greens	Sandra Betts	2,393	6.7	−0.9
Christians	Damien de Pyle	1,115	3.1	+3.1
Country Alliance	Glenn Williams	905	2.5	−0.3
Independent	Anthony McAleer	447	1.2	+1.2
Independent	Lawrence Mobsby	271	0.8	+0.8
Total formal votes		35,977	94.3	−1.1
Informal votes		2,182	5.7	+1.1
Turnout		38,159	95.0	+2.0
Two-party-preferred result
Liberal	Christine Fyffe	21,476	59.6	−3.0
Labor	Peter Harris	14,562	40.4	+3.0
Liberal hold		Swing	−3.0	

=== Ferntree Gully ===
2014 Victorian state election: Ferntree Gully
Party	Candidate	Votes	%	±%
Liberal	Nick Wakeling	19,452	53.9	−0.9
Labor	Matt Posetti	11,967	33.2	+2.8
Greens	Steve Raymond	3,279	9.1	+1.0
Christians	Robert Roytel	940	2.6	+2.6
Country Alliance	Russell Wulf	451	1.2	+1.2
Total formal votes		36,089	95.3	+0.2
Informal votes		1,781	4.7	−0.2
Turnout		37,870	92.9	−4.7
Two-party-preferred result
Liberal	Nick Wakeling	20,849	57.8	−3.7
Labor	Matt Posetti	15,238	42.2	+3.7
Liberal hold		Swing	−3.7	

=== Footscray ===
2014 Victorian state election: Footscray
Party	Candidate	Votes	%	±%
Labor	Marsha Thomson	17,542	45.1	−1.4
Liberal	Kim Vu	10,386	26.7	+1.9
Greens	Rod Swift	6,682	17.2	−0.6
Independent	Catherine Cumming	2,985	7.7	+0.5
Voice for the West	Ken Betts	1,272	3.3	+3.3
Total formal votes		38,867	94.1	+0.3
Informal votes		2,422	5.9	−0.3
Turnout		41,289	89.5	+2.2
Two-party-preferred result
Labor	Marsha Thomson	25,065	64.5	−1.4
Liberal	Kim Vu	13,802	35.5	+1.4
Labor hold		Swing	−1.4	

=== Forest Hill ===
2014 Victorian state election: Forest Hill
Party	Candidate	Votes	%	±%
Liberal	Neil Angus	18,340	49.7	+0.9
Labor	Pauline Richards	12,984	35.2	−3.0
Greens	Brewis Atkinson	3,289	8.9	+1.1
Animal Justice	Kane Rogers	999	2.7	+2.7
Christians	Lynne Maddison	561	1.5	+1.5
Family First	Wendy Ross	508	1.4	−0.6
Country Alliance	Melissa Trotter	211	0.6	+0.6
Total formal votes		36,892	95.7	−0.6
Informal votes		1,646	4.3	+0.6
Turnout		38,538	94.0	−1.1
Two-party-preferred result
Liberal	Neil Angus	20,286	54.8	+1.3
Labor	Pauline Richards	16,717	45.2	−1.3
Liberal hold		Swing	+1.3	

=== Frankston ===
2014 Victorian state election: Frankston
Party	Candidate	Votes	%	±%
Liberal	Sean Armistead	12,542	35.8	−9.4
Labor	Paul Edbrooke	12,241	35.0	−2.9
Independent	Geoff Shaw	4,514	12.9	+12.9
Greens	Jeanette Swain	2,790	8.0	−0.7
Sex Party	Jamie Miller	972	2.8	+0.5
Family First	Paul Mason	415	1.2	−0.4
Independent	Jerome Breen	311	0.9	+0.9
Christians	Anthony Wallace	308	0.9	+0.9
Rise Up Australia	Lin Tregenza	212	0.6	+0.6
Save The Planet	Reade Smith	179	0.5	+0.5
People Power Victoria	Alan Nicholls	158	0.5	+0.5
Independent	Joseph Toscano	140	0.4	+0.4
Independent	Mervyn Vogt	125	0.4	+0.4
Independent	Marianne Tootell	87	0.2	+0.2
Total formal votes		34,994	91.1	−4.0
Informal votes		3,410	8.9	+4.0
Turnout		38,404	92.0	+0.6
Two-party-preferred result
Labor	Paul Edbrooke	17,665	50.5	+0.9
Liberal	Sean Armistead	17,329	49.5	−0.9
Labor gain from Liberal		Swing	+0.9	

=== Geelong ===
2014 Victorian state election: Geelong
Party	Candidate	Votes	%	±%
Labor	Christine Couzens	16,516	41.0	−1.3
Liberal	Paula Kontelj	15,232	37.8	−2.3
Greens	Bruce Lindsay	4,833	12.0	+1.2
Shooters and Fishers	Pedro Pegan	1,021	2.5	+2.5
Family First	Ruth Clark	962	2.4	+0.3
Independent	Douglas Mann	659	1.6	+1.6
Country Alliance	Tony Leen	564	1.4	+0.0
Socialist Alliance	Sarah Hathway	468	1.2	+0.9
Total formal votes		40,255	95.2	−0.2
Informal votes		2,020	4.8	+0.2
Turnout		42,275	93.9	−3.1
Two-party-preferred result
Labor	Christine Couzens	22,556	56.0	+2.1
Liberal	Paula Kontelj	17,699	44.0	−2.1
Labor hold		Swing	+2.1	

=== Gembrook ===
2014 Victorian state election: Gembrook
Party	Candidate	Votes	%	±%
Liberal	Brad Battin	20,646	54.7	+1.2
Labor	Collin Ross	11,568	30.6	−2.3
Greens	Michael Schilling	3,197	8.5	+0.3
Christians	Simon Beard	659	1.7	+1.7
Independent	Damian Heffernan	519	1.4	+1.4
Country Alliance	Alan Stoops	518	1.4	−0.0
Rise Up Australia	Ferdie Verdan	406	1.1	+1.1
Independent	Frank Dean	248	0.7	+0.3
Total formal votes		37,761	94.7	−0.0
Informal votes		2,106	5.3	+0.0
Turnout		39,867	94.4	+7.9
Two-party-preferred result
Liberal	Brad Battin	22,324	59.0	+0.2
Labor	Collin Ross	15,545	41.0	−0.2
Liberal hold		Swing	+0.2	

=== Gippsland East ===
2014 Victorian state election: Gippsland East
Party	Candidate	Votes	%	±%
National	Tim Bull	22,984	60.4	+15.2
Labor	Kate Maxfield	7,754	20.4	+12.9
Greens	Scott Campbell-Smith	3,035	8.0	+2.7
Country Alliance	David Hutchison	1,436	3.8	+1.2
Independent	Leigh McDonald	929	2.4	+2.4
Independent	Peter Gardner	763	2.0	+2.0
Independent	Peter McKenzie	644	1.7	+1.7
Rise Up Australia	Jenny Jack	531	1.4	+1.4
Total formal votes		38,076	94.4	−2.4
Informal votes		2,270	5.6	+2.4
Turnout		40,346	93.6	+1.0
Two-party-preferred result
National	Tim Bull	25,954	67.9	−5.2
Labor	Kate Maxfield	12,263	32.1	+5.2
National hold		Swing	−5.2	

=== Gippsland South ===
2014 Victorian state election: Gippsland South
Party	Candidate	Votes	%	±%
National	Peter Ryan	20,468	57.3	−6.6
Labor	Lynn Psaila	7,819	21.9	+3.0
Greens	Ian Onley	3,436	9.6	−0.3
Country Alliance	Deb Meester	1,853	5.2	−2.2
Independent	Phil Piper	1,093	3.1	+3.1
Rise Up Australia	Patrick Winterton	1,076	3.0	+3.0
Total formal votes		35,745	94.5	−1.1
Informal votes		2,082	5.5	+1.1
Turnout		37,827	94.0	+1.2
Two-party-preferred result
National	Peter Ryan	23,503	65.7	−6.9
Labor	Lynn Psaila	12,289	34.3	+6.9
National hold		Swing	−6.9	

=== Hastings ===
2014 Victorian state election: Hastings
Party	Candidate	Votes	%	±%
Liberal	Neale Burgess	21,316	51.2	−1.7
Labor	Steven Hosking	13,109	31.5	−0.7
Greens	Derek Fagan	3,096	7.4	+0.4
Independent	Robert Andersson	2,133	5.1	+5.1
Country Alliance	Scot Leslie	940	2.3	+0.8
Rise Up Australia	Colin Robertson	697	1.7	+1.7
Independent	Paul Madigan	343	0.8	+0.8
Total formal votes		41,634	94.1	−0.2
Informal votes		2,608	5.9	+0.2
Turnout		44,242	93.8	+1.9
Two-party-preferred result
Liberal	Neale Burgess	24,036	57.6	−2.0
Labor	Steven Hosking	17,657	42.4	+2.0
Liberal hold		Swing	−2.0	

=== Hawthorn ===
2014 Victorian state election: Hawthorn
Party	Candidate	Votes	%	±%
Liberal	John Pesutto	20,551	54.5	−6.3
Labor	John McNally	9,117	24.2	+3.1
Greens	Tim Hartnett	8,042	21.3	+4.5
Total formal votes		37,710	96.2	−0.8
Informal votes		1,470	3.8	+0.8
Turnout		39,180	93.0	+1.9
Two-party-preferred result
Liberal	John Pesutto	22,041	58.6	−8.0
Labor	John McNally	15,577	41.4	+8.0
Liberal hold		Swing	−8.0	

=== Ivanhoe ===
2014 Victorian state election: Ivanhoe
Party	Candidate	Votes	%	±%
Liberal	Carl Ziebell	15,730	40.0	−2.0
Labor	Anthony Carbines	14,133	36.0	+0.1
Greens	Paul Kennedy	6,147	15.6	−1.8
Independent	Craig Langdon	1,905	4.8	+4.8
Christians	Gurmender Grewal	558	1.4	+1.4
Family First	Jesse Boer	474	1.2	+0.9
Independent	Abdirizak Mohamed	355	0.9	+0.9
Total formal votes		39,302	95.4	−0.1
Informal votes		1,890	4.6	+0.1
Turnout		41,192	92.8	−1.4
Two-party-preferred result
Labor	Anthony Carbines	20,991	53.4	+1.6
Liberal	Carl Ziebell	18,311	46.6	−1.6
Labor hold		Swing	+1.6	

=== Kew ===
2014 Victorian state election: Kew
Party	Candidate	Votes	%	±%
Liberal	Tim Smith	22,552	57.2	−3.4
Labor	James Gaffey	10,448	26.5	+3.2
Greens	Lynn Frankes	6,433	16.3	+1.9
Total formal votes		39,433	95.9	−0.8
Informal votes		1,691	4.1	+0.8
Turnout		41,124	93.7	+1.1
Two-party-preferred result
Liberal	Tim Smith	23,899	60.6	−5.0
Labor	James Gaffey	15,510	39.4	+5.0
Liberal hold		Swing	−5.0	

=== Keysborough ===
2014 Victorian state election: Keysborough
Party	Candidate	Votes	%	±%
Labor	Martin Pakula	19,664	53.1	+2.0
Liberal	Adrianne Fleming	11,803	31.8	−0.9
Greens	Susan Fyfield	2,124	5.7	−0.4
Independent	Hung Vo	2,000	5.4	+2.0
Rise Up Australia	Andrew Cunningham	1,088	2.9	+2.9
Independent	Michael Carty	386	1.0	+1.0
Total formal votes		37,094	93.9	+0.8
Informal votes		2,393	6.1	−0.8
Turnout		39,487	93.2	+1.4
Two-party-preferred result
Labor	Martin Pakula	23,013	61.9	+2.4
Liberal	Adrianne Fleming	14,164	38.1	−2.4
Labor hold		Swing	+2.4	

=== Kororoit ===
2014 Victorian state election: Kororoit
Party	Candidate	Votes	%	±%
Labor	Marlene Kairouz	23,913	60.3	+6.7
Liberal	Goran Kesic	8,690	21.9	−2.9
Greens	Philip Hill	2,921	7.4	−3.7
Independent	Margaret Giudice	2,918	7.4	+7.4
Voice for the West	Shashi Turner	1,215	3.1	+3.1
Total formal votes		39,657	93.3	+1.0
Informal votes		2,843	6.7	−1.0
Turnout		42,500	92.0	+3.4
Two-party-preferred result
Labor	Marlene Kairouz	27,791	70.0	+2.5
Liberal	Goran Kesic	11,922	30.0	−2.5
Labor hold		Swing	+2.5	

=== Lara ===
2014 Victorian state election: Lara
Party	Candidate	Votes	%	±%
Labor	John Eren	21,457	55.9	+2.9
Liberal	Tony McManus	11,090	28.9	−2.3
Greens	Gregory Lacey	3,413	8.9	+0.5
Family First	Rami Fosberry	1,256	3.3	−1.6
Country Alliance	George Reed	1,148	3.0	+0.8
Total formal votes		38,364	95.4	+0.9
Informal votes		1,851	4.6	−0.9
Turnout		40,215	93.5	+3.4
Two-party-preferred result
Labor	John Eren	25,746	67.1	+3.3
Liberal	Tony McManus	12,618	32.9	−3.3
Labor hold		Swing	+3.3	

=== Lowan ===
2014 Victorian state election: Lowan
Party	Candidate	Votes	%	±%
National	Emma Kealy	21,087	54.1	−13.2
Labor	Bob Scates	7,243	18.6	−3.6
Independent	Katrina Rainsford	5,532	14.2	+14.2
Greens	Nkandu Beltz	3,324	8.5	+2.9
Country Alliance	Steve Price	1,796	4.6	+4.5
Total formal votes		38,982	95.5	−0.7
Informal votes		1,851	4.5	+0.7
Turnout		40,833	95.0	−0.8
Two-party-preferred result
National	Emma Kealy	27,773	71.3	−0.7
Labor	Bob Scates	11,199	28.7	+0.7
National hold		Swing	−0.7	

=== Macedon ===
2014 Victorian state election: Macedon
Party	Candidate	Votes	%	±%
Liberal	Donna Petrovich	16,376	43.1	+0.5
Labor	Mary-Anne Thomas	14,677	38.7	−0.4
Greens	Neil Barker	5,841	15.4	+2.2
Family First	Peter Harland	1,061	2.8	+0.9
Total formal votes		37,955	96.3	+0.9
Informal votes		1,445	3.7	−0.9
Turnout		39,400	94.8	+5.7
Two-party-preferred result
Labor	Mary-Anne Thomas	20,417	53.8	+1.4
Liberal	Donna Petrovich	17,538	46.2	−1.4
Labor hold		Swing	+1.4	

=== Malvern ===
2014 Victorian state election: Malvern
Party	Candidate	Votes	%	±%
Liberal	Michael O'Brien	22,642	62.6	−2.8
Labor	Les Tarczon	7,730	21.4	+2.0
Greens	James Bennett	5,780	16.0	+1.9
Total formal votes		36,152	96.0	−0.9
Informal votes		1,515	4.0	+0.9
Turnout		37,667	92.5	+2.2
Two-party-preferred result
Liberal	Michael O'Brien	23,958	66.3	−4.3
Labor	Les Tarczon	12,205	33.7	+4.3
Liberal hold		Swing	−4.3	

=== Melbourne ===
2014 Victorian state election: Melbourne
Party	Candidate	Votes	%	±%
Greens	Ellen Sandell	15,333	41.4	+8.9
Labor	Jennifer Kanis	10,830	29.3	−5.0
Liberal	Ed Huntingford	8,913	24.1	−4.7
Animal Justice	Kate Elliott	802	2.2	+2.2
Christians	Neville Chisholm	491	1.3	+1.3
Voice for the West	Tehiya Umer	325	0.9	+0.9
Family First	Kerry Sutherland	306	0.8	+0.8
Total formal votes		37,000	96.5	+0.2
Informal votes		1,343	3.5	−0.2
Turnout		38,343	87.5	+2.3
Notional two-party-preferred count
Labor	Jennifer Kanis	26,071	70.5	+6.1
Liberal	Ed Huntingford	10,929	29.5	−6.1
Two-candidate-preferred result
Greens	Ellen Sandell	19,401	52.4	+7.1
Labor	Jennifer Kanis	17,599	47.6	−7.1
Greens gain from Labor		Swing	+7.1	

=== Melton ===
2014 Victorian state election: Melton
Party	Candidate	Votes	%	±%
Labor	Don Nardella	19,272	50.5	+0.4
Liberal	Daryl Lang	11,783	30.8	+0.9
Greens	Marie-Anne Cooper	2,777	7.3	−1.5
Voice for the West	Monika Thomas	1,544	4.0	+4.0
Independent	Matt DeLeon	1,392	3.6	+0.2
Christians	Mabor Chadhuol	532	1.4	+1.4
Country Alliance	Sav Mangion	443	1.2	−1.3
Independent	Victor Bennett	338	0.9	+0.9
Independent	Mohamad Aljofan	114	0.3	+0.3
Total formal votes		38,195	91.9	−0.9
Informal votes		3,379	8.1	+0.9
Turnout		41,574	92.6	+4.0
Two-party-preferred result
Labor	Don Nardella	23,495	61.2	−2.4
Liberal	Daryl Lang	14,885	38.8	+2.4
Labor hold		Swing	−2.4	

=== Mildura ===
2014 Victorian state election: Mildura
Party	Candidate	Votes	%	±%
National	Peter Crisp	16,794	46.1	−3.5
Independent	Ali Cupper	7,755	21.3	+21.3
Labor	Shane Roberts	4,244	11.6	−3.5
Country Alliance	Danny Lee	3,485	9.6	+9.6
Independent	Jo Clutterbuck	1,556	4.3	+4.3
Rise Up Australia	Carl Carter	1,012	2.8	+2.8
Greens	Morgana Russell	671	1.8	−0.0
Family First	Judith Fenn	633	1.7	−1.3
Independent	Mark Cory	286	0.8	+0.8
Total formal votes		36,436	92.9	−1.3
Informal votes		2,763	7.0	+1.3
Turnout		39,199	92.3	+1.4
Notional two-party-preferred count
National	Peter Crisp	25,585	70.2	+5.7
Labor	Shane Roberts	10,851	29.8	−5.7
Two-candidate-preferred result
National	Peter Crisp	21,271	58.0	−6.5
Independent	Ali Cupper	15,379	42.0	+42.0
National hold		Swing	N/A	

=== Mill Park ===
2014 Victorian state election: Mill Park
Party	Candidate	Votes	%	±%
Labor	Lily D'Ambrosio	22,807	59.8	+1.7
Liberal	George Varughese	10,317	27.1	−0.9
Greens	Jeremy Graham	2,640	6.9	−0.1
Family First	Peter Simmons	2,383	6.3	+1.3
Total formal votes		38,147	94.3	+0.3
Informal votes		2,306	5.7	−0.3
Turnout		40,453	94.1	+8.0
Two-party-preferred result
Labor	Lily D'Ambrosio	26,314	69.9	+2.9
Liberal	George Varughese	11,356	30.1	−2.9
Labor hold		Swing	+2.9	

=== Monbulk ===
2014 Victorian state election: Monbulk
Party	Candidate	Votes	%	±%
Liberal	Mark Verschuur	15,063	40.1	−4.6
Labor	James Merlino	14,096	37.5	+3.4
Greens	Michael Clarke	5,029	13.4	−1.6
Animal Justice	Jennifer McAdam	1,079	2.9	+2.9
Family First	Amelia Mason	786	2.1	−0.0
Democratic Labour	Ron Prendergast	433	1.2	−0.4
Rise Up Australia	Ana Rojas	427	1.1	+1.1
Save The Planet	Jordan Crook	342	0.9	+0.9
Country Alliance	Craig Jenkin	293	0.8	−0.2
Total formal votes		37,548	94.8	−0.7
Informal votes		2,044	5.2	+0.7
Turnout		39,592	94.5	−1.6
Two-party-preferred result
Labor	James Merlino	20,643	55.0	+6.1
Liberal	Mark Verschuur	16,905	45.0	−6.1
Labor gain from Liberal		Swing	+6.1	

=== Mordialloc ===
2014 Victorian state election: Mordialloc
Party	Candidate	Votes	%	±%
Liberal	Lorraine Wreford	16,807	43.8	−2.2
Labor	Tim Richardson	14,840	38.7	+0.6
Greens	Alexander Breskin	3,031	7.9	−2.1
Democratic Labour	Damien Brick	877	2.3	+0.4
Sex Party	Tristram Chellew	737	1.9	+0.8
Independent	Rosemary West	715	1.9	+1.9
Family First	Jeevaloshni Govender	379	1.0	−0.8
Independent	Leon Pompei	371	1.0	+1.0
Independent	Georgina Oxley	301	0.8	+0.8
Rise Up Australia	Rod Figueroa	193	0.5	+0.5
Independent	Victoria Oxley	103	0.3	+0.3
Total formal votes		38,354	93.6	−1.3
Informal votes		2,641	6.4	+1.3
Turnout		40,995	94.0	−1.7
Two-party-preferred result
Labor	Tim Richardson	19,981	52.1	+3.6
Liberal	Lorraine Wreford	18,373	47.9	−3.6
Labor gain from Liberal		Swing	+3.6	

=== Mornington ===
2014 Victorian state election: Mornington
Party	Candidate	Votes	%	±%
Liberal	David Morris	23,184	58.8	−2.8
Labor	Rebecca Wright	10,762	27.3	+2.2
Greens	Matthew McLaren	4,618	11.7	+1.2
Rise Up Australia	Peter Moldovan	453	1.2	+1.1
Country Alliance	Marion Barnes	416	1.1	−0.1
Total formal votes		39,433	96.0	−0.2
Informal votes		1,660	4.0	+0.2
Turnout		41,093	94.2	+2.9
Two-party-preferred result
Liberal	David Morris	24,711	62.6	−3.6
Labor	Rebecca Wright	14,759	37.4	+3.6
Liberal hold		Swing	−3.6	

=== Morwell ===
2014 Victorian state election: Morwell
Party	Candidate	Votes	%	±%
National	Russell Northe	17,824	44.4	−4.9
Labor	Jadon Mintern	14,282	35.6	+4.3
Independent	Tracie Lund	4,377	10.9	+10.9
Greens	Dan Caffrey	1,894	4.7	−0.3
Country Alliance	Stewart Birkett	950	2.4	−1.3
Rise Up Australia	Peter Dorian	423	1.1	+1.1
Restoration	Jacqueline Rose	380	0.9	+0.9
Total formal votes		40,130	94.6	−0.4
Informal votes		2,283	5.4	+0.4
Turnout		42,413	93.4	+1.4
Two-party-preferred result
National	Russell Northe	20,787	51.8	−11.5
Labor	Jadon Mintern	19,343	48.2	+11.5
National hold		Swing	−11.5	

=== Mount Waverley ===
2014 Victorian state election: Mount Waverley
Party	Candidate	Votes	%	±%
Liberal	Michael Gidley	18,357	51.2	−1.4
Labor	Jennifer Yang	13,184	36.7	+3.3
Greens	Perky Raj Khangure	3,432	9.6	+2.0
Christians	Stephen Chong Zheng	915	2.6	+2.5
Total formal votes		35,888	96.2	−0.1
Informal votes		1,422	3.8	+0.1
Turnout		37,310	93.3	−1.7
Two-party-preferred result
Liberal	Michael Gidley	19,489	54.6	−4.0
Labor	Jennifer Yang	16,211	45.4	+4.0
Liberal hold		Swing	−4.0	

=== Mulgrave ===
2014 Victorian state election: Mulgrave
Party	Candidate	Votes	%	±%
Labor	Daniel Andrews	17,150	47.8	+2.8
Liberal	Robert Davies	14,622	40.8	−2.4
Greens	Josh Fergeus	2,525	7.0	−0.2
Family First	Norman Fenn	969	2.7	−0.3
Rise Up Australia	Maree Wood	579	1.6	+1.6
Total formal votes		35,845	94.8	+0.6
Informal votes		1,960	5.2	−0.6
Turnout		37,805	92.9	−0.8
Two-party-preferred result
Labor	Daniel Andrews	19,528	54.5	+2.1
Liberal	Robert Davies	16,317	45.5	−2.1
Labor hold		Swing	+2.1	

=== Murray Plains ===
2014 Victorian state election: Murray Plains
Party	Candidate	Votes	%	±%
National	Peter Walsh	25,406	63.3	−7.3
Labor	Peter Williams	8,190	20.4	+6.6
Country Alliance	Bryon Winn	2,978	7.4	+1.1
Greens	Ian Christoe	1,619	4.0	−0.0
Rise Up Australia	Laurie J. Wintle	1,037	2.6	+2.6
Independent	Nigel Anthony Hicks	924	2.3	+2.3
Total formal votes		40,154	94.5	−1.2
Informal votes		2,331	5.5	+1.2
Turnout		42,485	93.7	+3.0
Two-party-preferred result
National	Peter Walsh	29,100	72.4	−7.8
Labor	Peter Williams	11,111	27.6	+7.8
National hold		Swing	−7.8	

=== Narracan ===
2014 Victorian state election: Narracan
Party	Candidate	Votes	%	±%
Liberal	Gary Blackwood	22,907	55.2	−5.4
Labor	Kate Marten	12,223	29.5	+3.7
Greens	Malcolm McKelvie	3,720	9.0	+1.1
Country Alliance	Dave Snelling	1,673	4.0	−0.1
Rise Up Australia	Norman Baker	973	2.3	+2.3
Total formal votes		41,496	95.8	−0.2
Informal votes		1,829	4.2	+0.2
Turnout		43,325	94.1	+1.2
Two-party-preferred result
Liberal	Gary Blackwood	25,482	61.3	−4.7
Labor	Kate Marten	16,095	38.7	+4.7
Liberal hold		Swing	−4.7	

=== Narre Warren North ===
2014 Victorian state election: Narre Warren North
Party	Candidate	Votes	%	±%
Labor	Luke Donnellan	17,421	46.6	+2.3
Liberal	Amanda Stapledon	14,849	39.7	+0.1
Greens	Karen Jones	2,114	5.7	−1.3
Christians	Mery Mekhail	1,012	2.7	+2.7
Rise Up Australia	Robert George White	902	2.4	+2.4
Independent	Wasim Qureshi	550	1.5	+1.5
Democratic Labour	Chris Blackburn	527	1.4	−1.3
Total formal votes		37,375	93.3	−0.4
Informal votes		2,706	6.8	+0.4
Turnout		40,081	92.6	−0.3
Two-party-preferred result
Labor	Luke Donnellan	20,392	54.6	−0.2
Liberal	Amanda Stapledon	16,981	45.4	+0.2
Labor hold		Swing	−0.2	

=== Narre Warren South ===
2014 Victorian state election: Narre Warren South
Party	Candidate	Votes	%	±%
Labor	Judith Graley	19,501	48.2	−1.0
Liberal	Susan Serey	16,212	40.1	+2.5
Greens	Lynette Keleher	2,465	6.1	−0.8
Rise Up Australia	Anthony Sofe	1,278	3.2	+3.2
Christians	Narmien Andrawis	1,021	2.5	+2.5
Total formal votes		40,477	94.4	+0.3
Informal votes		2,414	5.6	−0.3
Turnout		42,891	93.6	+6.0
Two-party-preferred result
Labor	Judith Graley	22,461	55.5	−1.9
Liberal	Susan Serey	18,016	44.5	+1.9
Labor hold		Swing	−1.9	

=== Nepean ===
2014 Victorian state election: Nepean
Party	Candidate	Votes	%	±%
Liberal	Martin Dixon	20,984	53.3	−5.5
Labor	Carolyn Gleixner	12,253	31.1	+4.3
Greens	Craig Thomson	4,658	11.8	−0.9
Country Alliance	Matthew Schmidt	655	1.7	+0.3
Rise Up Australia	Laura Yue	460	1.2	+1.2
Independent	David J. Stanton	339	0.9	+0.9
Total formal votes		39,349	95.0	−0.8
Informal votes		2,056	5.0	+0.8
Turnout		41,405	92.7	+0.1
Two-party-preferred result
Liberal	Martin Dixon	22,694	57.6	−6.1
Labor	Carolyn Gleixner	16,684	42.4	+6.1
Liberal hold		Swing	−6.1	

=== Niddrie ===
2014 Victorian state election: Niddrie
Party	Candidate	Votes	%	±%
Labor	Ben Carroll	17,342	46.2	+2.8
Liberal	Rebecca Gauci Maurici	14,101	37.5	+0.6
Greens	Sarah Roberts	3,045	8.1	+0.0
Independent	Andrea Surace	1,002	2.7	+2.7
Voice for the West	Paddy Dewan	892	2.4	+2.4
Independent	Andrew Gunter	478	1.3	+1.3
Christians	John Warner	394	1.1	+1.0
Independent	Appollo Yianni	323	0.9	+0.9
Total formal votes		37,577	93.6	+1.3
Informal votes		2,572	6.4	−1.3
Turnout		40,149	94.4	+1.9
Two-party-preferred result
Labor	Ben Carroll	21,686	57.7	+3.2
Liberal	Rebecca Gauci Maurici	15,891	42.3	−3.2
Labor hold		Swing	+3.2	

=== Northcote ===
2014 Victorian state election: Northcote
Party	Candidate	Votes	%	±%
Labor	Fiona Richardson	15,928	41.0	−3.1
Greens	Trent McCarthy	14,101	36.3	+4.4
Liberal	Anthony D'Angelo	6,407	16.5	−3.2
The Basics Rock 'n' Roll	Jamie McCarney	1,043	2.7	+2.7
Animal Justice	Georgina Purcell	678	1.7	+1.7
Family First	Helen Fenn	390	1.0	+1.0
Save The Planet	Bryony Edwards	324	0.8	+0.8
Total formal votes		38,871	95.8	−0.0
Informal votes		1,713	4.2	+0.0
Turnout		40,584	91.7	+2.1
Notional two-party-preferred count
Labor	Fiona Richardson	31,027	79.8	+4.3
Liberal	Anthony D'Angelo	7,844	20.2	−4.3
Two-candidate-preferred result
Labor	Fiona Richardson	21,783	56.0	−4.2
Greens	Trent McCarthy	17,088	44.0	+4.2
Labor hold		Swing	−4.2	

=== Oakleigh ===
2014 Victorian state election: Oakleigh
Party	Candidate	Votes	%	±%
Labor	Steve Dimopoulos	15,903	45.8	+4.3
Liberal	Theo Zographos	13,303	38.3	−1.4
Greens	Steven Merriel	4,617	13.3	−1.5
Independent	Anna Scotto	677	1.9	+1.9
Independent	Parashos Kioupelis	260	0.7	+0.7
Total formal votes		34,760	95.4	−0.1
Informal votes		1,662	4.6	+0.1
Turnout		36,422	92.1	+2.4
Two-party-preferred result
Labor	Steve Dimopoulos	20,224	58.2	+3.1
Liberal	Theo Zographos	14,536	41.8	−3.1
Labor hold		Swing	+3.1	

=== Ovens Valley ===
2014 Victorian state election: Ovens Valley
Party	Candidate	Votes	%	±%
National	Tim McCurdy	20,394	55.5	−0.5
Labor	Gail Cholosznecki	8,147	22.2	+2.5
Greens	Jamie McCaffrey	3,694	10.0	+3.7
Country Alliance	Julian Fidge	3,442	9.4	+3.6
Independent	Ray Dyer	1,099	3.0	+3.0
Total formal votes		36,776	95.5	+0.3
Informal votes		1,730	4.5	−0.3
Turnout		38,506	93.7	+4.3
Two-party-preferred result
National	Tim McCurdy	24,502	66.6	−2.7
Labor	Gail Cholosznecki	12,305	33.4	+2.7
National hold		Swing	−2.7	

=== Pascoe Vale ===
2014 Victorian state election: Pascoe Vale
Party	Candidate	Votes	%	±%
Labor	Lizzie Blandthorn	18,679	47.7	−6.9
Liberal	Jacqueline Khoo	10,416	26.6	−0.7
Greens	Liam Farrelly	6,372	16.3	+0.4
Independent	Francesco Timpano	1,282	3.3	+3.3
Socialist Alliance	Sean Brocklehurst	1,260	3.2	+3.2
Family First	Thomas Ha	1,148	2.9	+2.9
Total formal votes		39,157	93.6	−0.1
Informal votes		2,663	6.4	+0.1
Turnout		41,820	91.2	+1.4
Two-party-preferred result
Labor	Lizzie Blandthorn	26,240	66.8	−1.7
Liberal	Jacqueline Khoo	13,060	33.2	+1.7
Labor hold		Swing	−1.7	

=== Polwarth ===
2014 Victorian state election: Polwarth
Party	Candidate	Votes	%	±%
Liberal	Terry Mulder	21,861	55.4	−0.5
Labor	Libby Coker	11,045	28.0	+1.1
Greens	Simon Northeast	4,352	11.0	+2.8
Country Alliance	Philip Edge	2,206	5.6	+1.7
Total formal votes		39,464	96.1	−0.1
Informal votes		1,599	3.9	+0.1
Turnout		41,063	94.9	+1.8
Two-party-preferred result
Liberal	Terry Mulder	23,944	60.6	−3.2
Labor	Libby Coker	15,541	39.4	+3.2
Liberal hold		Swing	−3.2	

=== Prahran ===
2014 Victorian state election: Prahran
Party	Candidate	Votes	%	±%
Liberal	Clem Newton-Brown	16,582	44.8	−2.8
Labor	Neil Pharaoh	9,586	25.9	−1.5
Greens	Sam Hibbins	9,160	24.8	+5.0
Animal Justice	Eleonora Gullone	837	2.3	+2.3
Family First	Alan Walker	282	0.8	+0.2
Independent	Jason Simon Goldsmith	247	0.7	+0.7
Independent	Steve Stefanopoulos	227	0.6	+0.6
Independent	Alan Maxwell Menadue	82	0.2	+0.2
Total formal votes		37,003	94.9	−1.9
Informal votes		1,991	5.1	+1.9
Turnout		38,994	88.5	+4.4
Notional two-party-preferred count
Liberal	Clem Newton-Brown	18,580	50.03	−4.6
Labor	Neil Pharaoh	18,555	49.97	+4.6
Two-candidate-preferred result
Greens	Sam Hibbins	18,640	50.4	+50.4
Liberal	Clem Newton-Brown	18,363	49.6	−5.1
Greens gain from Liberal		Swing	+5.1	

=== Preston ===
2014 Victorian state election: Preston
Party	Candidate	Votes	%	±%
Labor	Robin Scott	17,607	48.4	−5.5
Liberal	John Forster	7,694	21.2	−5.1
Greens	Rose Ljubicic	5,869	16.1	−3.0
Independent	Gaetano Greco	4,103	11.3	+11.3
Family First	Rachel Ward	1,091	3.0	+2.7
Total formal votes		36,364	94.7	+1.2
Informal votes		2,043	5.3	−1.2
Turnout		38,407	90.8	+0.2
Two-party-preferred result
Labor	Robin Scott	27,199	74.7	+4.5
Liberal	John Forster	9,235	25.3	−4.5
Labor hold		Swing	+4.5	

=== Richmond ===
2014 Victorian state election: Richmond
Party	Candidate	Votes	%	±%
Labor	Richard Wynne	13,349	33.3	−3.9
Greens	Kathleen Maltzahn	12,615	31.5	+2.9
Liberal	Weiran Lu	8,308	20.7	−2.0
Independent Socialist	Stephen Jolly	3,407	8.5	−0.2
Sex Party	Nevena Spirovska	1,336	3.3	+0.5
Animal Justice	Miranda Smith	578	1.4	+1.4
Family First	Sarah Knight	317	0.8	+0.8
Independent	Tom Keel	192	0.5	+0.5
Total formal votes		40,102	96.3	−0.1
Informal votes		1,550	3.7	+0.1
Turnout		41,652	89.2	+1.4
Notional two-party-preferred count
Labor	Richard Wynne	29,303	73.1	+2.7
Liberal	Weiran Lu	10,799	26.9	−2.7
Two-candidate-preferred result
Labor	Richard Wynne	20,798	51.9	−4.5
Greens	Kathleen Maltzahn	19,304	48.1	+4.5
Labor hold		Swing	−4.5	

=== Ringwood ===
2014 Victorian state election: Ringwood
Party	Candidate	Votes	%	±%
Liberal	Dee Ryall	17,440	48.1	−1.6
Labor	Tony Clark	11,777	32.5	+0.7
Greens	Brendan Powell	3,903	10.8	−1.1
Independent	Michael Challinger	1,440	4.0	+4.0
Christians	Karen Dobby	1,131	3.1	+3.1
People Power Victoria	Steve Raskovy	287	0.8	+0.8
Country Alliance	Brian Dungey	279	0.8	+0.8
Total formal votes		36,257	95.7	−0.6
Informal votes		1,643	4.3	+0.6
Turnout		37,900	93.8	−1.1
Two-party-preferred result
Liberal	Dee Ryall	19,919	55.1	−1.2
Labor	Tony Clark	16,250	44.9	+1.2
Liberal hold		Swing	−1.2	

=== Ripon ===
2014 Victorian state election: Ripon
Party	Candidate	Votes	%	±%
Labor	Daniel McGlone	14,059	35.1	−3.7
Liberal	Louise Staley	13,118	32.8	+4.2
National	Scott Turner	7,342	18.3	−2.7
Greens	Rod May	2,856	7.1	+1.2
Family First	Danielle Fowler	897	2.2	−0.7
Country Alliance	Trevor Domaschenz	495	1.2	−1.5
Democratic Labour	Mitchell Lee	490	1.2	+1.2
Rise Up Australia	Peter Mulcahy	448	1.1	+1.1
Christians	Kevin Loiterton	352	0.9	+0.9
Total formal votes		40,057	93.6	−1.6
Informal votes		2,732	6.4	+1.6
Turnout		42,789	94.8	+1.8
Two-party-preferred result
Liberal	Louise Staley	20,329	50.8	−0.9
Labor	Daniel McGlone	19,728	49.2	+0.9
Liberal hold		Swing	−0.9	

=== Rowville ===
2014 Victorian state election: Rowville
Party	Candidate	Votes	%	±%
Liberal	Kim Wells	18,758	53.8	−3.5
Labor	Tamika Hicks	12,419	35.7	+5.7
Greens	Tim Wise	2,566	7.4	+0.8
Rise Up Australia	Leanne Price	1,096	3.2	+3.1
Total formal votes		34,839	94.5	−0.3
Informal votes		2,042	5.5	+0.3
Turnout		36,881	95.0	+3.0
Two-party-preferred result
Liberal	Kim Wells	20,363	58.4	−4.7
Labor	Tamika Hicks	14,499	41.6	+4.7
Liberal hold		Swing	−4.7	

=== Sandringham ===
2014 Victorian state election: Sandringham
Party	Candidate	Votes	%	±%
Liberal	Murray Thompson	19,264	51.6	−9.0
Labor	Christina Zigouras	9,103	24.4	+2.4
Greens	Adam McBeth	5,144	13.8	−2.0
Independent	Clarke Martin	3,840	10.3	+10.3
Total formal votes		37,351	96.5	+0.3
Informal votes		1,369	3.5	−0.3
Turnout		38,720	93.4	+3.0
Two-party-preferred result
Liberal	Murray Thompson	21,393	57.3	−8.2
Labor	Christina Zigouras	15,920	42.7	+8.2
Liberal hold		Swing	−8.2	

=== Shepparton ===
2014 Victorian state election: Shepparton
Party	Candidate	Votes	%	±%
National	Greg Barr	14,272	35.4	−18.4
Independent	Suzanna Sheed	13,211	32.7	+32.7
Labor	Rodney Higgins	7,218	17.9	+1.7
Country Alliance	Michael Bourke	3,310	8.2	−11.5
Greens	Damien Stevens	1,365	3.4	−1.3
Independent	Diane Teasdale	994	2.5	+2.5
Total formal votes		40,370	94.2	−0.3
Informal votes		2,504	5.8	+0.3
Turnout		42,874	92.8	−1.1
Notional two-party-preferred count
National	Greg Barr	25,546	63.3	−12.6
Labor	Rodney Higgins	14,824	36.7	+12.6
Two-candidate-preferred result
Independent	Suzanna Sheed	21,247	52.6	+52.6
National	Greg Barr	19,123	47.4	−28.5
Independent gain from National		Swing	N/A	

=== South Barwon ===
2014 Victorian state election: South Barwon
Party	Candidate	Votes	%	±%
Liberal	Andrew Katos	18,869	46.3	−1.2
Labor	Andy Richards	13,618	33.4	−2.1
Greens	Lisa Ashdowne	5,023	12.3	+3.2
Sex Party	Nick Wallis	806	2.0	+2.0
Animal Justice	Jamie Overend	778	1.9	+1.9
Family First	Steven Thompson	769	1.9	+0.0
Democratic Labour	Kevin Butler	472	1.2	+0.0
Country Alliance	Stephen Chara	459	1.1	−0.1
Total formal votes		40,794	96.1	+0.3
Informal votes		1,659	3.9	−0.3
Turnout		42,453	94.9	+4.2
Two-party-preferred result
Liberal	Andrew Katos	21,563	52.9	−2.0
Labor	Andy Richards	19,231	47.1	+2.0
Liberal hold		Swing	−2.0	

=== South-West Coast ===
2014 Victorian state election: South-West Coast
Party	Candidate	Votes	%	±%
Liberal	Denis Napthine	23,234	57.0	+7.7
Labor	Roy Reekie	11,507	28.2	+3.6
Greens	Thomas Campbell	3,993	9.8	+1.6
Country Alliance	Steven Moore	945	2.3	−1.2
Independent	Michael McCluskey	654	1.6	+1.6
Independent	Linda K. Smith	449	1.1	+1.1
Total formal votes		40,782	96.0	−0.0
Informal votes		1,715	4.0	+0.0
Turnout		42,497	94.9	+1.8
Two-party-preferred result
Liberal	Denis Napthine	24,914	61.0	−0.9
Labor	Roy Reekie	15,947	39.0	+0.9
Liberal hold		Swing	−0.9	

=== St Albans ===
2014 Victorian state election: St Albans
Party	Candidate	Votes	%	±%
Labor	Natalie Suleyman	21,435	56.4	+5.0
Liberal	Moira Deeming	10,215	26.9	+0.4
Greens	Lisa Asbury	3,475	9.1	−4.1
Voice for the West	Pat Aumua	1,424	3.8	+3.7
Christians	Marvet Boulos	1,080	2.8	+2.8
Independent	Irena Teresa Klajn	374	1.0	+1.0
Total formal votes		38,003	92.2	+0.1
Informal votes		3,228	7.8	−0.1
Turnout		41,231	89.6	−1.4
Two-party-preferred result
Labor	Natalie Suleyman	25,711	67.5	+3.5
Liberal	Moira Deeming	12,381	32.5	−3.5
Labor hold		Swing	+3.5	

=== Sunbury ===
2014 Victorian state election: Sunbury
Party	Candidate	Votes	%	±%
Labor	Josh Bull	16,358	44.1	−1.8
Liberal	Jo Hagan	13,384	36.1	−1.6
Greens	Ella Webb	2,918	7.9	−0.4
Independent	Steve Medcraft	2,850	7.7	+7.7
Christians	Charles Williams	802	2.2	+2.2
Independent	Billy Lopez	395	1.1	+1.1
Voice for the West	Vern Hughes	384	1.0	+1.0
Total formal votes		37,091	94.3	+0.3
Informal votes		2,239	5.7	−0.3
Turnout		39,330	93.9	−3.0
Two-party-preferred result
Labor	Josh Bull	20,105	54.3	−2.2
Liberal	Jo Hagan	16,968	45.7	+2.2
Labor hold		Swing	−2.2	

=== Sydenham ===
2014 Victorian state election: Sydenham
Party	Candidate	Votes	%	±%
Labor	Natalie Hutchins	22,752	57.4	+6.9
Liberal	John Varano	11,112	28.0	−1.6
Greens	Alex Schlotzer	2,814	7.1	−0.7
Voice for the West	Shaun McKerral	1,757	4.4	+4.4
Christians	Nadia Christofidis	1,225	3.1	+3.1
Total formal votes		39,660	93.4	+0.4
Informal votes		2,810	6.6	−0.4
Turnout		42,470	93.8	+3.1
Two-party-preferred result
Labor	Natalie Hutchins	26,301	66.3	+4.7
Liberal	John Varano	13,394	33.7	−4.7
Labor hold		Swing	+4.7	

=== Tarneit ===
2014 Victorian state election: Tarneit
Party	Candidate	Votes	%	±%
Labor	Telmo Languiller	17,446	46.8	−4.0
Liberal	Dinesh Gourisetty	9,839	26.4	−5.1
Greens	Rohan Waring	3,360	9.0	+0.1
Christians	Lem Baguot	1,603	4.3	+4.3
Voice for the West	Abdul Mujeeb Syed	1,106	3.0	+3.0
Independent	Joh Bauch	1,083	2.9	+2.9
Family First	Seelan Govender	931	2.5	−2.3
Independent	Safwat Ali	764	2.1	+2.0
Rise Up Australia	Clement Francis	657	1.8	+1.8
Independent	Chin Loi	491	1.3	+1.3
Total formal votes		37,280	91.9	−2.7
Informal votes		3,276	8.1	+2.7
Turnout		40,556	92.2	+13.1
Two-party-preferred result
Labor	Telmo Languiller	24,139	64.6	+3.5
Liberal	Dinesh Gourisetty	13,239	35.4	−3.5
Labor hold		Swing	+3.5	

=== Thomastown ===
2014 Victorian state election: Thomastown
Party	Candidate	Votes	%	±%
Labor	Bronwyn Halfpenny	22,786	66.7	+3.4
Liberal	Nitin Gursahani	5,801	17.0	−6.1
Family First	Trent Schneider-Johnson	2,047	6.0	+1.3
Greens	Ian Williamson	1,775	5.2	−3.2
Independent	Thomas Di Palma	1,753	5.1	+5.1
Total formal votes		34,162	93.0	+0.3
Informal votes		2,584	7.0	−0.3
Turnout		36,746	92.3	−1.5
Two-party-preferred result
Labor	Bronwyn Halfpenny	26,611	78.4	+6.8
Liberal	Nitin Gursahani	7,317	21.6	−6.8
Labor hold		Swing	+6.8	

=== Warrandyte ===
2014 Victorian state election: Warrandyte
Party	Candidate	Votes	%	±%
Liberal	Ryan Smith	21,982	56.9	−5.4
Labor	Steven Kent	11,289	29.2	+4.7
Greens	Richard Cranston	4,032	10.4	+0.7
Christians	David Leach	887	2.3	+2.3
Country Alliance	Keith Lyon	446	1.2	+1.1
Total formal votes		38,636	95.3	−0.6
Informal votes		1,916	4.7	+0.6
Turnout		40,552	94.3	−0.0
Two-party-preferred result
Liberal	Ryan Smith	23,804	61.6	−5.6
Labor	Steven Kent	14,840	38.4	+5.6
Liberal hold		Swing	−5.6	

=== Wendouree ===
2014 Victorian state election: Wendouree
Party	Candidate	Votes	%	±%
Labor	Sharon Knight	15,712	43.2	+3.1
Liberal	Craig Coltman	14,408	39.7	−5.1
Greens	Alice Barnes	3,629	10.0	−0.5
Sex Party	Liam Hastie	1,387	3.8	+3.8
Family First	Cielo Fenn	653	1.8	−1.3
Country Alliance	John Buchholz	343	0.9	−0.6
Rise Up Australia	Sheila O'Shea	201	0.6	+0.6
Total formal votes		36,333	95.1	+0.8
Informal votes		1,862	4.9	−0.8
Turnout		38,195	94.2	+0.9
Two-party-preferred result
Labor	Sharon Knight	20,270	55.8	+5.9
Liberal	Craig Coltman	16,063	44.2	−5.9
Labor gain from Liberal		Swing	+5.9	

=== Werribee ===
2014 Victorian state election: Werribee
Party	Candidate	Votes	%	±%
Labor	Tim Pallas	20,338	56.6	+8.1
Liberal	Tarun Singh	10,327	28.7	−3.7
Greens	Bro Sheffield-Brotherton	3,049	8.5	−0.9
Christians	Anne Okumu	1,167	3.2	+3.2
Voice for the West	Nhan Hoang Tran	1,045	2.9	+2.9
Total formal votes		35,926	93.6	−0.6
Informal votes		2,446	6.4	+0.6
Turnout		38,372	92.7	−1.0
Two-party-preferred result
Labor	Tim Pallas	23,607	65.7	+4.2
Liberal	Tarun Singh	12,349	34.4	−4.2
Labor hold		Swing	+4.2	

=== Williamstown ===
2014 Victorian state election: Williamstown
Party	Candidate	Votes	%	±%
Labor	Wade Noonan	18,417	44.6	−0.3
Liberal	Alan Shea	11,569	28.0	−2.7
Greens	Simon Crawford	8,547	20.7	−1.9
Voice for the West	Libby Krepp	2,268	5.5	+5.5
Independent	Khalil Wehbe	457	1.1	+1.1
Total formal votes		41,258	95.0	+0.4
Informal votes		2,175	5.0	−0.4
Turnout		43,433	92.1	+0.5
Two-party-preferred result
Labor	Wade Noonan	27,441	66.5	+3.3
Liberal	Alan Shea	13,849	33.5	−3.3
Labor hold		Swing	+3.3	

=== Yan Yean ===
2014 Victorian state election: Yan Yean
Party	Candidate	Votes	%	±%
Labor	Danielle Green	17,499	43.0	+3.6
Liberal	Sam Ozturk	17,030	41.9	−2.5
Greens	Daniel Sacchero	2,945	7.2	−2.0
Family First	Rodney Baker	1,157	2.8	−0.4
Shooters and Fishers	Rob Clark	1,111	2.7	+2.7
Country Alliance	Bruce Stevens	715	1.8	+1.1
Rise Up Australia	Geraldine Roelink	232	0.6	+0.6
Total formal votes		40,689	94.9	−0.0
Informal votes		2,188	5.1	+0.0
Turnout		42,877	95.4	+10.9
Two-party-preferred result
Labor	Danielle Green	21,831	53.7	+3.7
Liberal	Sam Ozturk	18,858	46.3	−3.7
Labor gain from Liberal		Swing	+3.7	

=== Yuroke ===
2014 Victorian state election: Yuroke
Party	Candidate	Votes	%	±%
Labor	Ros Spence	20,484	54.1	−2.2
Liberal	Phulvinderjit Grewal	8,943	23.6	−6.7
Christians	Imad Hirmiz	2,689	7.1	+7.1
Greens	Natalie Abboud	2,277	6.0	−3.2
Family First	Rodney Le Nepveu	1,868	4.9	+0.8
Independent	Mick Wilkins	1,606	4.2	+4.2
Total formal votes		37,867	93.5	−0.1
Informal votes		2,632	6.5	+0.1
Turnout		40,499	92.4	+7.3
Two-party-preferred result
Labor	Ros Spence	25,839	68.5	+2.5
Liberal	Phulvinderjit Grewal	11,869	31.5	−2.5
Labor hold		Swing	+2.5	

== See also ==
- Results of the Victorian state election, 2014 (Legislative Council)
- 2014 Victorian state election
- Candidates of the Victorian state election, 2014
- Members of the Victorian Legislative Assembly, 2014–2018
