= Candidates of the 2014 Victorian state election =

This is a list of candidates for the 2014 Victorian state election. The election was held on 29 November 2014.

At the close of nominations on 14 November 2014, there were a total of 896 candidates in the election (a 26 per cent increase to the 711 candidates in the 2010 election). There were 545 candidates contesting the 88 seats of the Victorian Legislative Assembly (up from 501, an 8.6 per cent increase); and 351 candidates contesting the 40 seats in the Legislative Council (up from 206, a 68 per cent increase).

== Redistribution and seat changes ==
A redistribution of Victoria's state electoral boundaries was finalised on 17 October 2013. It saw the abolition of the Labor seats of Ballarat East, Ballarat West, Clayton, Derrimut, Keilor and Lyndhurst; the Liberal seats of Doncaster, Kilsyth, Mitcham, Scoresby and Seymour; and the Nationals seats of Benalla, Murray Valley, Rodney and Swan Hill.

The fifteen seats created to replace the fifteen abolished seats were the notionally Labor seats of Buninyong, Clarinda, Keysborough, St Albans, Sunbury, Sydenham and Werribee; the notionally Liberal seats of Croydon, Eildon, Ringwood, Rowville and Wendouree; and the Nationals seats of Euroa, Murray Plains and Ovens Valley. In addition, the Labor-held seats of Bellarine, Monbulk, Ripon and Yan Yean became notionally Liberal.

- The member for Ballarat East, Geoff Howard (Labor), contested Buninyong.
- The member for Ballarat West, Sharon Knight (Labor), contested Wendouree.
- The member for Clayton, Hong Lim (Labor), contested Clarinda.
- The member for Derrimut, Telmo Languiller (Labor), contested Tarneit.
- The member for Doncaster, Mary Wooldridge (Liberal), contested the Legislative Council region of Eastern Metropolitan.
- The member for Eltham, Steve Herbert (Labor), contested the Legislative Council region of Northern Victoria.
- The member for Keilor, Natalie Hutchins (Labor), contested Sydenham.
- The member for Kilsyth, David Hodgett (Liberal), contested Croydon.
- The member for Lyndhurst, Martin Pakula (Labor), contested Keysborough.
- The member for Mitcham, Dee Ryall (Liberal), contested Ringwood.
- The member for Murray Valley, Tim McCurdy (Nationals), contested Ovens Valley.
- The member for Rodney, Paul Weller (Nationals), contested the Legislative Council region of Northern Victoria.
- The member for Scoresby, Kim Wells (Liberal), contested Rowville.
- The member for Seymour, Cindy McLeish (Liberal), contested Eildon.
- The member for Swan Hill, Peter Walsh (Nationals), contested Murray Plains.
- The member for Tarneit, Tim Pallas (Labor), contested Werribee.
- Northern Metropolitan MLC Matthew Guy (Liberal) contested Bulleen.

== Retiring MPs ==
=== Labor ===
- Ann Barker MLA (Oakleigh) – announced 25 November 2013
- Liz Beattie MLA (Yuroke) – announced 25 November 2013
- Christine Campbell MLA (Pascoe Vale) – announced 13 November 2013
- Joanne Duncan MLA (Macedon) – announced 4 November 2013
- Joe Helper MLA (Ripon) – announced 3 December 2012
- Justin Madden MLA (Essendon) – announced 15 November 2013
- John Pandazopoulos MLA (Dandenong) – announced 26 November 2013
- Ian Trezise MLA (Geelong) – announced 3 February 2014
- Kaye Darveniza MLC (Northern Victoria) – announced 29 November 2013
- John Lenders MLC (Southern Metropolitan) – announced 18 November 2013
- Marg Lewis MLC (Northern Victoria) – appointed to a casual vacancy but did not contest preselection
- Johan Scheffer MLC (Eastern Victoria)
- Matt Viney MLC (Eastern Victoria) – announced 15 November 2013

=== Liberal ===
- Ted Baillieu MLA (Hawthorn) – announced 22 August 2014
- Nicholas Kotsiras MLA (Bulleen) – announced 12 January 2014
- Andrew McIntosh MLA (Kew) – announced 17 December 2013
- Ken Smith MLA (Bass) – announced 13 January 2014
- Andrea Coote MLC (Southern Metropolitan) – announced 19 January 2014
- David Koch MLC (Western Victoria) – announced 14 March 2014
- Jan Kronberg MLC (Eastern Metropolitan) – announced 19 March 2014

=== National ===
- Hugh Delahunty MLA (Lowan) – announced 10 February 2014
- Jeanette Powell MLA (Shepparton) – announced 8 February 2014
- Bill Sykes MLA (Benalla) – announced 9 January 2014

== Legislative Assembly ==
Sitting members are shown in bold text. Successful candidates are highlighted in the relevant colour. Where there is possible confusion, an asterisk (*) is also used.

Electorate	Held by	Labor candidates	Coalition candidates	Greens candidates	Family First candidates	Other candidates
Albert Park	Labor	**Martin Foley**	Shannon Eeles (Lib)	David Collis	Deborah Geyer	Steven Armstrong (Ind); James Hurley (Sex); Tex Perkins (Ind)
Altona	Labor	**Jill Hennessy**	Nihal Samara (Lib)	Chris de Bono		Jemal Hiabu (VFTW); Brijender Nain (Ind); Anthony O'Neill (AC)
Bass	Liberal	Sanjay Nathan	Brian Paynter (Lib)	Ross Fairhurst		David Amor (ACA); Angela Dorian (RUAP); Clare Le Serve (Ind); Paul Reid (AC)
Bayswater	Liberal	Tony Dib	**Heidi Victoria** (Lib)	James Tennant		John Carbonari (Ind); Jeremy Cass (ACA); Tristan Conway (AC); Robert Smyth (AJP)
Bellarine	Liberal	**Lisa Neville**	Ron Nelson (Lib)	Brenton Peake	Robert Keenan	Christopher Dawson (RUAP); Rhiannon Hunter (Sex); John Irvine (ACA); Gus Kacinskas (Ind); Joshua Williams (SFP)
Benambra	Liberal	Jennifer Podesta	**Bill Tilley** (Lib)	Richard Wellard		Phil Rourke (ACA)
Bendigo East	Labor	**Jacinta Allan**	Greg Bickley (Lib)	Jennifer Alden	Glenis Bradshaw	Lynette Bell (RUAP); Cameron Dowling (ACA)
Bendigo West	Labor	**Maree Edwards**	Michael Langdon (Lib)	John Brownstein	Amanda Moskalewicz	Sandra Caddy (RUAP); Elise Chapman (ACA)
Bentleigh	Liberal	Nick Staikos	**Elizabeth Miller** (Lib)	Sean Mulcahy	David Clark	Ross McCawley (Sex); Kelley Moldovan (RUAP); Chandra Ojha (Ind); Sofia Telemzouguer (PPV)
Box Hill	Liberal	Stefanie Perri	**Robert Clark** (Lib)	Bill Pemberton		Frank Reale (AC); Geoffrey Stokie (Ind)
Brighton	Liberal	Louise Crawford	**Louise Asher** (Lib)	Margaret Beavis		Jane Touzeau (Ind)
Broadmeadows	Labor	**Frank McGuire**	Evren Onder (Lib)	Jaime de Loma-Osorio Ricon	Wayne Knight	Mohamed Hassan (VFTW); John Rinaldi (Ind)
Brunswick	Labor	**Jane Garrett**	Giuseppe Vellotti (Lib)	Tim Read	Frank Giurleo	Stella Kariofyllidis (PPV); Dean O'Callaghan (Ind); Babar Peters (AC); Ward Young (AJP)
Bulleen	Liberal	Adam Rundell	Matthew Guy (Lib)	Ben Cronly		Eleni Arapoglou (AC)
Bundoora	Labor	**Colin Brooks**	Amita Gill (Lib)	Clement Stanyon	James Widdowson	
Buninyong	Labor	**Geoff Howard**	Sonia Smith (Nat); Ben Taylor (Lib)	Tony Goodfellow	Keith Geyer	James Keays (ACA)
Burwood	Liberal	Gavin Ryan	**Graham Watt** (Lib)	Beck Stuart		Peter Campbell (Ind)
Carrum	Liberal	Sonya Kilkenny	**Donna Bauer** (Lib)	Henry Kelsall	Richard Vernay	Margaret Quinn (RUAP)
Caulfield	Liberal	Josh Burns	**David Southwick** (Lib)	Tim Baxter		Teresa Horvath (RUAP); John Myers (Ind)
Clarinda	Labor	**Hong Lim**	Gandhi Bevinakoppa (Lib)	James Talbot-Kamoen		James Marinis (Ind); Melanie Vassiliou (RUAP)
Cranbourne	Labor	**Jude Perera**	Geoff Ablett (Lib)	Nagaraj Nayak	Pamela Keenan	Rosemary Blake (Ind); Jonathan Eli (RUAP); Laith Graham (Sex); Rania Michael (AC)
Croydon	Liberal	Lesley Fielding	**David Hodgett** (Lib)	Jill Wild		Sarah Barclay (ACA); Mike Brown (AC); Joel Martin (Ind)
Dandenong	Labor	Gabrielle Williams	Joanna Palatsides (Lib)	John Gulzari	Noelle Walker	Dale Key (Ind); Carlton King (RUAP)
Eildon	Liberal	Sally Brennan	Jim Child (Nat); **Cindy McLeish*** (Lib)	Marie Sellstrom	David Prentice	Bruce Argyle (Ind); Jane Judd (Ind); Jeff Leake (ACA)
Eltham	Labor	Vicki Ward	Steven Briffa (Lib)	Liezl Shnookal	Janna Fenn	Chris Byrne (Ind); Ryan Ebert (Ind); Michael Janson (AC)
Essendon	Labor	Danny Pearson	Fred Ackerman (Lib)	Ashley Waite		Richard Lawrence (Ind); Mario Mendez (VFTW)
Euroa	National	Clare Malcolm	Steph Ryan* (Nat); Tony Schneider (Lib)	Simon Roberts	Julie-Anne Winzer	Lisa Adams (ACA)
Evelyn	Liberal	Peter Harris	**Christine Fyffe** (Lib)	Sandra Betts		Damien de Pyle (AC); Anthony McAleer (Ind); Lawrence Mobsby (Ind); Glenn Williams (ACA)
Ferntree Gully	Liberal	Matt Posetti	**Nick Wakeling** (Lib)	Steve Raymond		Robert Roytel (AC); Russell Wulf (ACA)
Footscray	Labor	**Marsha Thomson**	Kim Vu (Lib)	Rod Swift		Ken Betts (VFTW); Catherine Cumming (Ind)
Forest Hill	Liberal	Pauline Richards	**Neil Angus** (Lib)	Brewis Atkinson	Wendy Ross	Kane Rogers (AJP); Lynne Maddison (AC); Melissa Trotter (ACA)
Frankston	Liberal	Paul Edbrooke	Sean Armistead (Lib)	Jeanette Swain	Paul Mason	Jerome Breen (Ind); Jamie Miller (Sex); Alan Nicholls (PPV); **Geoff Shaw** (Ind); Reade Smith (Ind); Marianne Tootell (Ind); Joseph Toscano (Ind); Lyn Tregenza (RUAP); Mervyn Vogt (Ind); Anthony Wallace (AC)
Geelong	Labor	Christine Couzens	Paula Kontelj (Lib)	Bruce Lindsay	Ruth Clark	Sarah Hathway (SA); Tony Leen (ACA); Doug Mann (Ind); Pedro Pegan (SFP)
Gembrook	Liberal	Collin Ross	**Brad Battin** (Lib)	Michael Schilling		Simon Beard (AC); Frank Dean (Ind); Damian Heffernan (Ind); Alan Stoops (ACA); Ferdie Verdan (RUAP)
Gippsland East	National	Kate Maxfield	**Tim Bull** (Nat)	Scott Campbell-Smith		Peter Gardner (Ind); David Hutchison (ACA); Jenny Jack (RUAP); Leigh McDonald (Ind); Peter McKenzie (Ind)
Gippsland South	National	Lynn Psaila	**Peter Ryan** (Nat)	Ian Onley		Deb Meester (ACA); Phil Piper (Ind); Patrick Winterton (RUAP)
Hastings	Liberal	Steven Hosking	**Neale Burgess** (Lib)	Derek Fagan		Robert Andersson (Ind); Scot Leslie (ACA); Paul Madigan (Ind); Colin Robertson (RUAP)
Hawthorn	Liberal	John McNally	John Pesutto (Lib)	Tim Hartnett		
Ivanhoe	Labor	**Anthony Carbines**	Carl Ziebell (Lib)	Paul Kennedy	Jesse Boer	Gurmender Grewal (AC); Craig Langdon (Ind); Abdirizak Mohamed (Ind)
Kew	Liberal	James Gaffey	Tim Smith (Lib)	Lynn Frankes		
Keysborough	Labor	**Martin Pakula**	Adrianne Fleming (Lib)	Susan Fyfield		Michael Carty (Ind); Andrew Cunningham (RUAP); Hung Vo (Ind)
Kororoit	Labor	**Marlene Kairouz**	Goran Kesic (Lib)	Philip Hill		Margaret Giudice (Ind); Shashi Turner (VFTW)
Lara	Labor	**John Eren**	Tony McManus (Lib)	Gregory Lacey	Rami Fosberry	George Reed (ACA)
Lowan	National	Bob Scates	Emma Kealy (Nat)	Nkandu Beltz		Steve Price (ACA); Katrina Rainsford (Ind)
Macedon	Labor	Mary-Anne Thomas	Donna Petrovich (Lib)	Neil Barker	Peter Harland	
Malvern	Liberal	Les Tarczon	**Michael O'Brien** (Lib)	James Bennett		
Melbourne	Labor	**Jennifer Kanis**	Ed Huntingford (Lib)	Ellen Sandell	Kerry Sutherland	Neville Chisholm (AC); Kate Elliott (AJP); Tehiya Umer (VFTW)
Melton	Labor	**Don Nardella**	Daryl Lang (Lib)	Marie-Anne Cooper		Mohamad Alfojan (Ind); Victor Bennett (Ind); Mabor Chadhuol (AC); Matt DeLeon (Ind); Sav Mangion (ACA); Monika Thomas (VFTW)
Mildura	National	Shane Roberts	**Peter Crisp** (Nat)	Morgana Russell	Judith Fenn	Carl Carter (RUAP); Jo Clutterbuck (Ind); Mark Cory (Ind); Ali Cupper (Ind); Danny Lee (ACA)
Mill Park	Labor	**Lily D'Ambrosio**	George Varughese (Lib)	Jeremy Graham	Peter Simmons	
Monbulk	Liberal	**James Merlino**	Mark Verschuur (Lib)	Michael Clarke	Amelia Mason	Jordan Crook (Ind); Craig Jenkin (ACA); Jennifer McAdam (AJP); Ron Prendergast (DLP); Ana Rojas (RUAP)
Mordialloc	Liberal	Tim Richardson	**Lorraine Wreford** (Lib)	Alexander Breskin	Jeevaloshni Govender	Damien Brick (DLP); Tristram Chellew (Sex); Rod Figueroa (RUAP); Georgina Oxley (Ind); Victoria Oxley (Ind); Leon Pompei (Ind); Rosemary West (Ind)
Mornington	Liberal	Rebecca Wright	**David Morris** (Lib)	Matthew McLaren		Marion Barnes (ACA); Peter Moldovan (RUAP)
Morwell	National	Jadon Mintern	**Russell Northe** (Nat)	Dan Caffrey		Stewart Birkett (ACA); Peter Dorian (RUAP); Tracie Lund (Ind); Jacqueline Rose (Ind)
Mount Waverley	Liberal	Jennifer Yang	**Michael Gidley** (Lib)	Perky Raj Khangure		Stephen Zheng (AC)
Mulgrave	Labor	**Daniel Andrews**	Robert Davies (Lib)	Josh Fergeus	Norman Fenn	Maree Wood (RUAP)
Murray Plains	National	Peter Williams	**Peter Walsh** (Nat)	Ian Christoe		Nigel Hicks (Ind); Bryon Winn (ACA); Laurie Wintle (RUAP)
Narracan	Liberal	Kate Marten	**Gary Blackwood** (Lib)	Malcolm McKelvie		Norman Baker (RUAP); Dave Snelling (ACA)
Narre Warren North	Labor	**Luke Donnellan**	Amanda Stapledon (Lib)	Karen Jones		Chris Blackburn (DLP); Mery Mekhail (AC); Wasim Qureshi (Ind); Robert White (RUAP)
Narre Warren South	Labor	**Judith Graley**	Susan Serey (Lib)	Lynette Keleher		Narmien Andrawis (AC); Anthony Sofe (RUAP)
Nepean	Liberal	Carolyn Gleixner	**Martin Dixon** (Lib)	Craig Thomson		Matthew Schmidt (ACA); David Stanton (Ind); Laura Yue (RUAP)
Niddrie	Labor	**Ben Carroll**	Rebecca Gauci Maurici (Lib)	Sarah Roberts		Paddy Dewan (VFTW); Andrew Gunter (Ind); Andrea Surace (Ind); John Warner (AC); Appollo Yianni (Ind)
Northcote	Labor	**Fiona Richardson**	Anthony D'Angelo (Lib)	Trent McCarthy	Helen Fenn	Bryony Edwards (Ind); Jamie McCarney (BRRP); Georgina Purcell (AJP)
Oakleigh	Labor	Steve Dimopoulos	Theo Zographos (Lib)	Steven Merriel		Parashos Kioupelis (Ind); Anna Scotto (Ind)
Ovens Valley	National	Gail Cholosznecki	**Tim McCurdy** (Nat)	Jamie McCaffrey		Ray Dyer (Ind); Julian Fidge (ACA)
Pascoe Vale	Labor	Lizzie Blandthorn	Jacqueline Khoo (Lib)	Liam Farrelly	Thomas Ha	Sean Brocklehurst (SA); Francesco Timpano (Ind)
Polwarth	Liberal	Libby Coker	**Terry Mulder** (Lib)	Simon Northeast		Philip Edge (ACA)
Prahran	Liberal	Neil Pharaoh	**Clem Newton-Brown** (Lib)	Sam Hibbins	Alan Walker	Jason Goldsmith (Ind); Eleonora Gullone (AJP); Alan Menadue (Ind); Steve Stefanopoulos (Ind)
Preston	Labor	**Robin Scott**	John Forster (Lib)	Rose Ljubicic	Rachel Ward	Gaetano Greco (Ind)
Richmond	Labor	**Richard Wynne**	Weiran Lu (Lib)	Kathleen Maltzahn	Sarah Knight	Stephen Jolly (Ind); Tom Keel (Ind); Miranda Smith (AJP); Nevena Spirovska (Sex)
Ringwood	Liberal	Tony Clark	**Dee Ryall** (Lib)	Brendan Powell		Michael Challinger (Ind); Karen Dobby (AC); Brian Dungey (ACA); Steve Raskovy (PPV)
Ripon	Liberal	Daniel McGlone	Louise Staley* (Lib); Scott Turner (Nat)	Rod May	Danielle Fowler	Trevor Domaschenz (ACA); Mitchell Lee (DLP); Kevin Loiterton (AC); Peter Mulcahy (RUAP)
Rowville	Liberal	Tamika Hicks	**Kim Wells** (Lib)	Tim Wise		Leanne Price (RUAP)
Sandringham	Liberal	Christina Zigouras	**Murray Thompson** (Lib)	Adam McBeth		Clarke Martin (Ind)
Shepparton	National	Rod Higgins	Greg Barr (Nat)	Damien Stevens		Michael Bourke (ACA); Suzanna Sheed* (Ind); Diane Teasdale (Ind)
South Barwon	Liberal	Andy Richards	**Andrew Katos** (Lib)	Lisa Ashdowne	Steven Thompson	Kevin Butler (DLP); Stephen Chara (ACA); Jamie Overend (AJP); Nick Wallis (Sex)
South-West Coast	Liberal	Roy Reekie	**Denis Napthine** (Lib)	Thomas Campbell		Michael McCluskey (Ind); Steven Moore (ACA); Linda Smith (Ind)
St Albans	Labor	Natalie Suleyman	Moira Deeming (Lib)	Lisa Asbury		Pat Aumua (VFTW); Marvet Boulos (AC); Irena Klajn (Ind)
Sunbury	Labor	Josh Bull	Jo Hagan (Lib)	Ella Webb		Vern Hughes (VFTW); Billy Lopez (Ind); Steve Medcraft (Ind); Charles Williams (AC)
Sydenham	Labor	**Natalie Hutchins**	John Varano (Lib)	Alex Schlotzer		Nadia Christofidis (AC); Shaun McKerral (VFTW)
Tarneit	Labor	**Telmo Languiller**	Dinesh Gourisetty (Lib)	Rohan Waring	Seelan Govender	Safwat Ali (Ind); Lem Baguot (AC); Joh Bauch (Ind); Clement Francis (RUAP); Chin Loi (Ind); Abdul Mujeeb Syed (VFTW)
Thomastown	Labor	**Bronwyn Halfpenny**	Nitin Gursahani (Lib)	Ian Williamson	Trent Schneider-Johnson	Thomas Di Palma (Ind)
Warrandyte	Liberal	Steven Kent	**Ryan Smith** (Lib)	Richard Cranston		David Leach (AC); Keith Lyon (ACA)
Wendouree	Liberal	**Sharon Knight**	Craig Coltman (Lib)	Alice Barnes	Cielo Fenn	John Buchholz (ACA); Liam Hastie (Sex); Sheila O'Shea (RUAP)
Werribee	Labor	**Tim Pallas**	Tarun Singh (Lib)	Bro Sheffield-Brotherton		Anne Okumu (AC); Nhan Hoang Tran (VFTW)
Williamstown	Labor	**Wade Noonan**	Alan Shea (Lib)	Simon Crawford		Libby Krepp (VFTW); Khalil Wehbe (Ind)
Yan Yean	Liberal	**Danielle Green**	Sam Ozturk (Lib)	Daniel Sacchero	Rodney Baker	Rob Clark (SFP); Geraldine Roelink (RUAP); Bruce Stevens (ACA)
Yuroke	Labor	Ros Spence	Phulvinderjit Grewal (Lib)	Natalie Abboud	Rodney Le Nepveu	Imad Hirmiz (AC); Mick Wilkins (Ind)

== Legislative Council ==
Sitting members are shown in bold text. Tickets that elected at least one MLC are highlighted in the relevant colour. Successful candidates are identified by an asterisk (*).

=== Eastern Metropolitan ===
The Labor Party was defending two seats. The Liberal Party was defending three seats.

Labor candidates	Liberal candidates	Greens candidates	Family First candidates	PUP candidates	DLP candidates
1. **Shaun Leane***; 2. **Brian Tee**; 3. Dimity Paul; 4. Lauren Johnson	1. Mary Wooldridge*; 2. **Bruce Atkinson***; 3. **Richard Dalla-Riva***; 4. Grace Roy; 5. Shilpa Hegde	1. Samantha Dunn*; 2. Helen Harris; 3. Anthony Aulsebrook; 4. Linda Laos; 5. Christopher Kearney	1. Martin Myszka; 2. Andrew Conlon	1. Milton Wilde; 2. Brooke Brenner	1. Pat Shea; 2. Paul Jakubik
Sex Party candidates	Country All. candidates	Christians candidates	LDP candidates	SFP candidates	Animal Justice candidates
1. Stephen Barber; 2. Nelson Barber	1. Michael Barclay; 2. Trevor Kloprogge	1. Vickie Janson; 2. Jeff Reaney	1. Abe Salt; 2. Joel Moore	1. Kostandinos Giannikos; 2. Sean Anderson	1. Brenton Edgecombe; 2. Rosemary Lavin
VEP candidates	RUAP candidates	People Power candidates	Cyclists candidates		
1. David Scanlon; 2. Monte Bonwick	1. Barry Fitzsimons; 2. Paul Barbieri	1. Lou Coppola; 2. Alexander Buth	1. Neil Cameron; 2. Shane Bebe		

=== Eastern Victoria ===
The Labor Party was defending two seats. The Liberal/National Coalition was defending three seats.

Labor candidates	Coalition candidates	Greens candidates	Family First candidates	PUP candidates	DLP candidates
1. Harriet Shing*; 2. Daniel Mulino*; 3. Ian Maxfield; 4. John Anderson; 5. Sorina Grasso	1. **Edward O'Donohue*** (Lib); 2. **Danny O'Brien*** (Nat); 3. **Andrew Ronalds** (Lib); 4. Laetitia Jones (Lib); 5. Brenton Wight (Nat)	1. Andrea Millsom; 2. Louis Delacretaz; 3. Belinda Rogers; 4. Willisa Hogarth; 5. Malcolm Brown	1. Trudie Morris; 2. Joanne Di Lorenzo	1. Sarah Taylor; 2. James Unkles; 3. Daniel Gaylor	1. Gary Jenkins; 2. Andrew Kis-Rigo
Sex Party candidates	Country All. candidates	Christians candidates	LDP candidates	SFP candidates	Animal Justice candidates
1. Ange Hopkins; 2. Ken Hill	1. Andrew Jones; 2. Bradley Johnstone	1. Ash Belsar; 2. Vivian Hill	1. Jim McDonald; 2. Ben Buckley	1. Jeff Bourman*; 2. David Fent	1. Kristin Bacon; 2. Leah Folloni
VEP candidates	RUAP candidates	People Power candidates	Cyclists candidates	Ungrouped candidates	
1. Meg Paul; 2. Bruce Miller	1. Yvonne Gentle; 2. Jim Gentle	1. Linton Young; 2. Maureen Kirsch	1. Nick Burke; 2. Geoff Ballard	Rhonda Crooks; Christine Sindt; Jean-Michel David; Jeff Bartram	

=== Northern Metropolitan ===
The Labor Party was defending two seats. The Liberal Party was defending two seats. The Greens were defending one seat.

Labor candidates	Liberal candidates	Greens candidates	Family First candidates	PUP candidates	DLP candidates
1. **Jenny Mikakos***; 2. **Nazih Elasmar***; 3. Burhan Yigit; 4. Martin Appleby	1. **Craig Ondarchie***; 2. Gladys Liu; 3. Amandeep Rosha; 4. David Mulholland; 5. Susan Turner	1. **Greg Barber***; 2. Alex Bhathal; 3. Alison Parkes; 4. Anthony Williams; 5. Gurm Sekhon	1. Brendan Fenn; 2. Sarah Clark	1. Maria Rigoni; 2. Mario Laing	1. Michael Murphy; 2. Mark Galvin
Sex Party candidates	Country All. candidates	Christians candidates	LDP candidates	SFP candidates	Animal Justice candidates
1. Fiona Patten*; 2. Joël Murray	1. Domenic Greco; 2. Evan Spanos	1. Maria Bengtsson; 2. John Carter	1. David Limbrick; 2. Erin Murphy	1. Christos Tzelepis; 2. Justin Rogan	1. Bruce Poon; 2. Maria McLaverty
VEP candidates	RUAP candidates	People Power candidates	Cyclists candidates	BRRP candidates	Vote 1 Local Jobs candidates
1. Bertha Franklin; 2. Jay Franklin	1. Michael Mastrantuono; 2. Simon Hay	1. Marc Florio; 2. Sheriden Tate; 3. Anne Paten	1. Nik Dow; 2. Geoff Cicuto	1. Kris Schroeder; 2. Tim Heath	1. Nathan Purcell; 2. Aaron Purcell
VFTW candidates	Independent candidates	Ungrouped candidates			
1. Phil Cleary; 2. Emma Phillips	1. Peter Allan; 2. Nicola Thomson; 3. Nicole Batch	Tiffany Harrison; Darren Bain			

=== Northern Victoria ===
The Labor Party was defending two seats. The Liberal/National Coalition was defending three seats.

Labor candidates	Coalition candidates	Greens candidates	Family First candidates	PUP candidates	DLP candidates
1. Steve Herbert*; 2. Jaclyn Symes*; 3. Jamie Byron; 4. Lydia Senior; 5. Kate Sutherland	1. **Wendy Lovell*** (Lib); 2. **Damian Drum*** (Nat); 3. **Amanda Millar** (Lib); 4. Paul Weller (Nat); 5. Adrian Wolter (Lib)	1. Jenny O'Connor; 2. Michelle Goldsmith; 3. Kate Toll; 4. Dennis Black; 5. Robin Rhodes	1. Alan Howard; 2. Jamie Baldwin	1. Hans Paas; 2. Owen Lysaght	1. Gerard Murphy; 2. Stefan Kos
Sex Party candidates	Country All. candidates	LDP candidates	SFP candidates	Animal Justice candidates	RUAP candidates
1. Charlie Crutchfield; 2. Amy Mulcahy	1. Robert Danieli; 2. Steven Threlfall	1. Tim Wilms; 2. Stephen Gream	1. Daniel Young*; 2. Anthony Donnellon	1. Lola Currie; 2. Jethro Dean	1. Tim Middleton; 2. Petra Parker
People Power candidates	Cyclists candidates				
1. Elizabeth Crooks; 2. John Cornish	1. Mark Horner; 2. Arwen Birch				

=== South Eastern Metropolitan ===
The Labor Party was defending three seats. The Liberal Party was defending two seats.

Labor candidates	Liberal candidates	Greens candidates	Family First candidates	PUP candidates	DLP candidates
1. **Gavin Jennings***; 2. **Adem Somyurek***; 3. **Lee Tarlamis**; 4. Ian Spencer; 5. Rosalie Davis	1. **Gordon Rich-Phillips***; 2. **Inga Peulich***; 3. Ali Khan; 4. Moti Visa; 5. George Hua	1. Nina Springle*; 2. Chris Jobe; 3. Wendy Smith; 4. John Flanders; 5. Stefan Zibell	1. Lynette Harland; 2. Jeremy Orchard	1. Jason Kennedy; 2. Bobby Singh; 3. Michael Oldfield	1. Michael Palma; 2. Lucia De Summa
Sex Party candidates	Christians candidates	LDP candidates	SFP candidates	Animal Justice candidates	VEP candidates
1. Martin Leahy; 2. Alex Chevallier	1. Sami Greiss; 2. Manal Dawoud	1. Leslie Hughes; 2. Matthew Lesich	1. Ryan Perry; 2. Allan Bevan	1. Elio Celotto; 2. Tyson Jack	1. Sorin Ionascu; 2. Greg Mauldon
RUAP candidates	People Power candidates	Cyclists candidates	Ungrouped candidates		
1. Daniel Nalliah; 2. Rosalie Crestani	1. Basil Walters; 2. Maria Sirianni	1. Robert Siddle; 2. Troy Parsons	Arif Okil		

=== Southern Metropolitan ===
The Labor Party was defending one seat. The Liberal Party was defending three seats. The Greens were defending one seat.

Labor candidates	Liberal candidates	Greens candidates	Family First candidates	PUP candidates	DLP candidates
1. Philip Dalidakis*; 2. Erik Locke; 3. Raff Ciccone; 4. Cassandra Devine; 5. Will Fowles	1. **David Davis***; 2. **Georgie Crozier***; 3. Margaret Fitzherbert*; 4. Ken Ong; 5. Nellie Khoroshina	1. **Sue Pennicuik***; 2. James Searle; 3. Rose Read; 4. Lorna Wyatt; 5. James Harrison	1. Shane Clark; 2. Gary Coombes	1. Dwayne Singleton; 2. Anthony Cresswell; 3. Scott Rankin	1. Vince Stefano; 2. Brendan Prendergast
Sex Party candidates	Country All. candidates	Christians candidates	LDP candidates	SFP candidates	Animal Justice candidates
1. Francesca Collins; 2. Darren Austin	1. Christopher Morris; 2. Andrew Driscoll	1. Faliana Lee; 2. Ian Dobby	1. Craig Bonsor; 2. Michelle Hamilton	1. Paul William; 2. Steven Zoumis	1. Nyree Walshe; 2. Fiona McRostie
VEP candidates	RUAP candidates	People Power candidates	Cyclists candidates	Independent candidates	Independent candidates
1. Penny McCasker; 2. Fiona Stewart	1. Peter Vassiliou; 2. Glenda Powell	1. Kenneth Miller; 2. Linda Jones	1. Richard Bowen; 2. Kathryn Siddle; 3. Marcus Barber	1. Clive Jackson; 2. Richard Grummet	1. Luzio Grossi; 2. Crystal James
Ungrouped candidates					
George Neophytou					

=== Western Metropolitan ===
The Labor Party was defending two seats. The Liberal Party was defending two seats. The Greens were defending one seat.

Labor candidates	Liberal candidates	Greens candidates	Family First candidates	PUP candidates	DLP candidates
1. **Cesar Melhem***; 2. **Khalil Eideh***; 3. Stanley Chiang; 4. George Seitz; 5. Kirsten Psaila	1. **Bernie Finn***; 2. **Andrew Elsbury**; 3. David Tran; 4. Gayle Murphy; 5. Cassandra Marr	1. **Colleen Hartland***; 2. Huong Truong; 3. Dinesh Jayasuriya; 4. Sam Long; 5. Jonathon Marsden	1. Jaxon Calder; 2. Rebecca Filliponi	1. Trevor Dance; 2. Peter Haberecht	1. Rachel Carling-Jenkins*; 2. Michael Freeman
Sex Party candidates	Country All. candidates	Christians candidates	LDP candidates	SFP candidates	Animal Justice candidates
1. Vicki Nash; 2. Adrian Trajstman	1. Ben Caruso; 2. Andrew Hepner	1. Geoff Rogers; 2. Kirsten James	1. Zeev Vinokurov; 2. Joel Spencer	1. Jake Wilson; 2. Trevor Carstein	1. Roy Taylor; 2. Douglas Leith
RUAP candidates	People Power candidates	Cyclists candidates	VFTW candidates		
1. Jeff Truscott; 2. Charles Rozario	1. Jerry Creaney; 2. Chez Caruso	1. Frank Reinthaler; 2. Nick O'Keefe	1. Berhan Ahmed; 2. Kylie Georgiou; 3. John Turner		

=== Western Victoria ===
The Labor Party was defending two seats. The Liberal/National Coalition was defending three seats.

Labor candidates	Liberal candidates	Greens candidates	Family First candidates	PUP candidates	DLP candidates
1. **Jaala Pulford***; 2. **Gayle Tierney***; 3. Jacinta Ermacora; 4. John Stewart; 5. Dale Edwards	1. **Simon Ramsay*** (Lib); 2. Josh Morris* (Lib); 3. **David O'Brien** (Nat); 4. Jennifer Almeida Reis (Lib); 5. Donna Winfield (Nat)	1. Lloyd Davies; 2. Judy Cameron; 3. Linda Zibell; 4. Ricky Lane; 5. Patchouly Paterson	1. Barry Newton; 2. Julie Gebbing	1. Catriona Thoolen; 2. Gerard Murphy; 3. Cameron Hickey	1. Mark Farrell; 2. Joanne Schill
Sex Party candidates	Country All. candidates	Christians candidates	LDP candidates	SFP candidates	Animal Justice candidates
1. Jayden Millard; 2. Douglas Leitch	1. Garry Kerr; 2. Ronald Heath	1. Anne Foster; 2. Leo van Veelen	1. Mark Thompson; 2. Baydon Beddoe	1. Nicole Bourman; 2. Megan Winter	1. Andy Meddick; 2. Jennifer Gamble
RUAP candidates	People Power candidates	Cyclists candidates	VFTW candidates	Vote 1 Local Jobs candidates	Ungrouped candidates
1. Michael Keane; 2. Merle Johnston	1. Philip Gluyas; 2. Dianne Bell	1. Kathy Francis; 2. Colin Charles	1. Garry Thomas; 2. Johanne Curran	1. James Purcell*; 2. Tanya Waterson	Gary Mannion

== Unregistered parties and groups ==
A number of parties without registration with the Victorian Electoral Commission nonetheless endorsed candidates, who appeared on the ballot paper as independents:

- The Australian Democrats endorsed Clive Jackson and Richard Brummet for Southern Metropolitan Region.
- The Australian Restoration Party endorsed Jacqueline Rose in Morwell.
- The Australian Stable Population Party endorsed Steven Armstrong in Albert Park.
- The Save the Planet Party endorsed Dean O'Callaghan in Brunswick, Reade Smith in Frankston, Jordan Crook in Monbulk, Bryony Edwards in Northcote and Tiffany Harrison in Northern Metropolitan Region.
- The Socialist Party endorsed Stephen Jolly in Richmond.

== See also ==
- 2014 Victorian state election
- Members of the Victorian Legislative Assembly, 2010–2014
- Members of the Victorian Legislative Council, 2010–2014
- Members of the Victorian Legislative Assembly, 2014–2018
- Members of the Victorian Legislative Council, 2014–2018
