= The Basics Rock 'n' Roll Party =

Political party in Victoria, Australia

The Basics Rock 'n' Roll Party was a political party in Victoria. It contested the 2014 Victorian state election. It ran Kris Schroeder and Tim Heath as candidates for the Northern Metropolitan region.
