= Climate Emergency Action Alliance =

Australian political party

Climate Emergency Action Alliance: Vote Planet
- Abbreviation: Vote Planet
- President: Kammy Cordney-Hunt
- Founded: 11 October 2019; 5 years ago
- Ideology: Climate change action Environmentalism
- National affiliation: Fusion Party

Website
- www.voteplanet.net

Climate Emergency Action Alliance: Vote Planet, formerly the Save Our One Planet Alliance, is an Australian political party founded in 2019. The party is an electoral alliance between the unregistered "Save the Planet" and "One Planet" parties. "Save Our One Planet Alliance" changed its name in 2021 to the "Climate Emergency Alliance: Vote Planet".

Save the Planet was formed in 2012, and several of its members have contested Victorian state elections in the electorates of Brunswick and Northcote.

The party's policies primarily focus around issues surrounding climate change, such as reducing greenhouse gas emissions and preparing for a post-climate change planet.

In early 2022, it merged with other parties to become the Fusion Party.

== Electoral history ==
=== Federal ===
Election year	Party (Note: Party was not registered, and all candidates formally contested as independents)	Candidate	Seat	Votes	%	±%
2013	Save The Planet	Dean O'Callaghan	Wills	2,040	2.25	+2.25
2018 by-election	Save The Planet	Adrian Whitehead	Batman	745	0.87	+0.87

=== Victoria ===
Election year	Party	Candidate	Seat	Votes	%	±%
2014	Save The Planet	Dean O'Callaghan	Brunswick	491	1.20	+1.20
2014	Save The Planet	Reade Smith	Frankston	179	0.50	+0.50
2014	Save The Planet	Jordan Crook	Monbulk	342	0.90	+0.90
2014	Save The Planet	Bryony Edwards	Northcote	324	0.80	+0.80
2014	Save The Planet	Tiffany Harrison	Northern Metro	177	0.04	+0.04
2017 by-election	Save The Planet	Bryony Edwards	Northcote	154	0.40	-0.40
2018	Save The Planet	Christopher Anderson	Brunswick	250	0.57	+0.57
2018	Save The Planet	Jordan Crook	Monbulk	1,176	3.10	+2.18
2018	Save The Planet	Bryony Edwards	Northcote	444	1.04	+0.21
2022	Save The Planet	Adrian Whitehead	Northcote	518	1.20	+1.20

=== Darebin ===
Election year	Party	Candidate	Ward	Votes	%	±%
2016	Save The Planet	Adrian Whitehead	Cazaly	363	1.55	+1.55
2016	Save The Planet	Bryony Edwards	Rucker	1,046	4.22	+4.22
2020	Save The Planet	Bryony Edwards	North East	1,438	14.84	+10.62
2020	Save The Planet	Philip David Sutton	South East	711	6.75	+6.75
2020	Save The Planet	Adrian Whitehead	South West	785	8.49	+6.94

== See also ==
- List of political parties in Australia
