= Jamie McCarney =

Australian actor

Jamie McCarney. Photo courtesy of Reg Edgar 2007.

Jamie McCarney is an Australian actor from the town of Dandenong, now residing in Northcote.

McCarney's television roles have included Tony Venucchi on the Melbourne television series Neighbours and Rory Stubbs in Blue Heelers.

In 2008, McCarney appeared on the ABC television series The Hollowmen.

In 2014 he ran for public office as a Member of The Basics Rock n' Roll Party in the Victorian State Election.

He is now a teacher at the school Mentone Grammar.
