= Voice for the West =

- President: Dr Berhan Ahmed
- Secretary: Vern Hughes
- Founder: Vern Hughes
- Ideology: Localism

Voice for the West was a minor political party in Australia. It was registered as a political party by the Victorian Electoral Commission in 2014 and ran candidates representing western Melbourne electorates in the 2014 Victorian state election.

The party was founded by several community leaders from the western suburbs of Melbourne, and aims to challenge members of the Labor Party dominant in the area, and to gain the balance of power in the state parliament.

The party's president was Dr Berhan Ahmed, and its founder and secretary was Vern Hughes. Former independent federal MP Phil Cleary stood as a Voice for the West candidate for the Victorian Legislative Council seat of Northern Metropolitan Region in the 2014 Victorian election.

After an unsuccessful 2014 election where the party managed less than 2% of the primary vote in the Western Metropolitan Region Legislative Council vote, the party was deregistered on 16 March 2015.

== See also ==
- The West Party - 2025 political party based in the western suburbs
