= People Power Victoria – No Smart Meters =

Australian political party

People Power Victoria – No Smart Meters was a political party in the Australian state of Victoria. Its principal policy was opposition to the introduction of smart meters for electricity, gas and water.

On 26 May 2017, the Victorian Electoral Commission de-registered the party.
