= 2014 Victorian state election =

Australian state election

- 29 November 2014

All 88 seats in the Victorian Legislative Assembly All 40 seats in the Victorian Legislative Council 45 seats needed for a majority
- Opinion polls
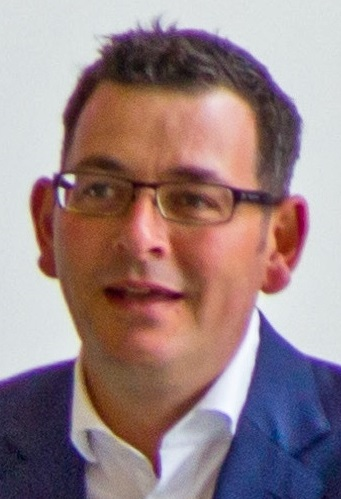

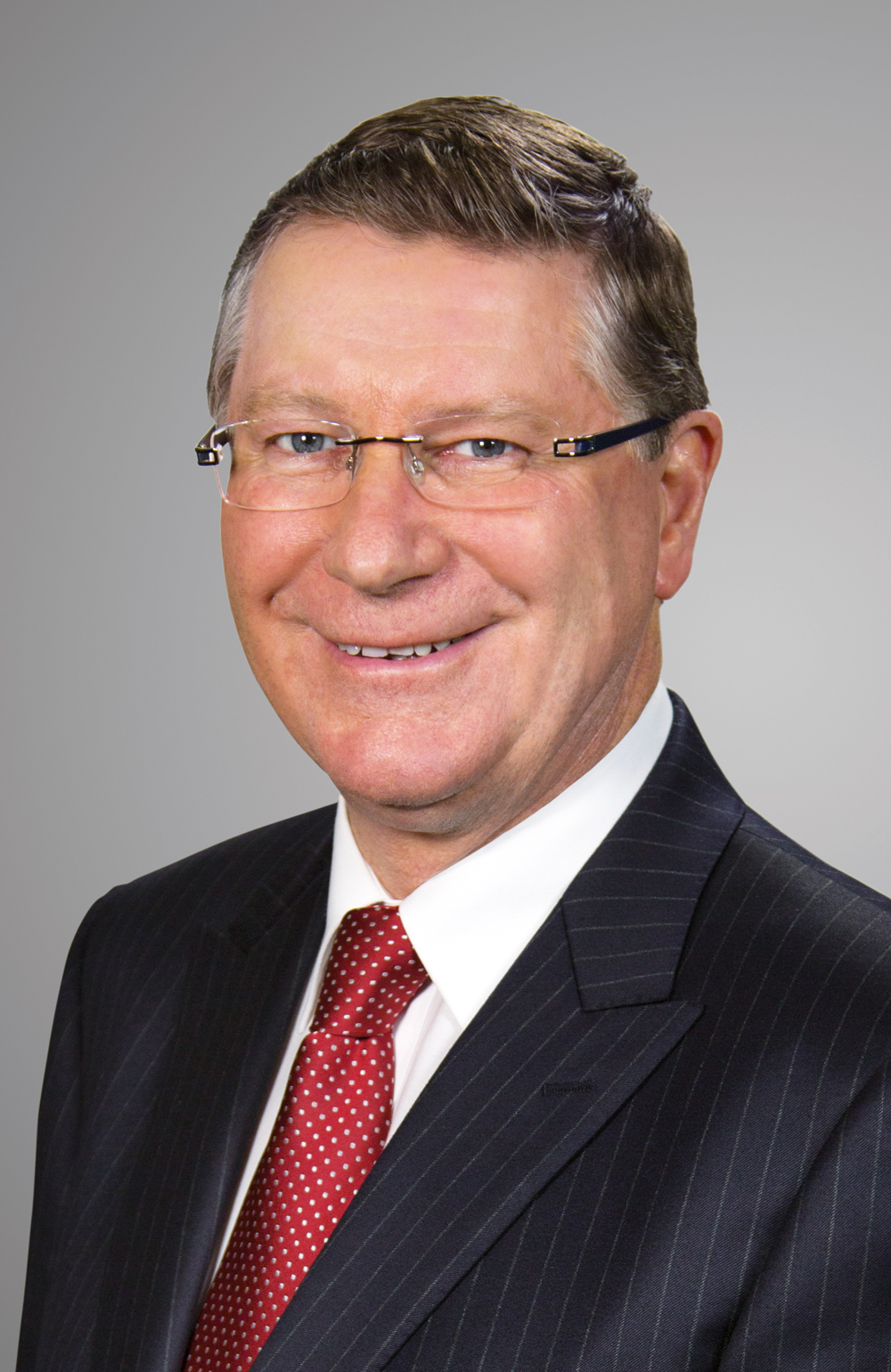

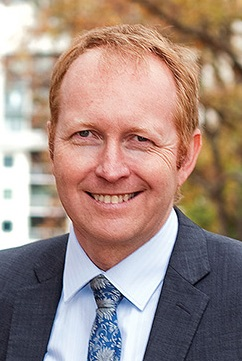
	First party	Second party	Third party
Leader	Daniel Andrews	Denis Napthine	Greg Barber
Party	Labor	Liberal–National coalition	Greens
Leader since	3 December 2010	6 March 2013	25 November 2006
Leader's seat	Mulgrave	South-West Coast	MLC for Northern Metropolitan
Last election	36.25%, 43 seats	44.78%, 45 seats	11.21%, 0 seats
Seats won	47	38	2
Seat change	▲4	▼7	▲2
Popular vote	1,278,436	1,409,282	385,190
Percentage	38.10%	42.00%	11.48%
Swing	▲1.84%	▼2.78%	▲0.27%
TPP	51.99%	48.01%
TPP swing	▲3.57%	▼3.57%
- Results in each electorate.
Premier before election
Denis Napthine
Liberal/National coalition
Premier after election
Daniel Andrews
Labor

The 2014 Victorian state election, held on Saturday, 29 November 2014, was for the 58th Parliament of Victoria. All 88 seats in the Victorian Legislative Assembly and 40 seats in the Victorian Legislative Council were up for election. The incumbent centre-right Coalition minority government, led by Liberal Party leader and Premier Denis Napthine and National Party leader and Deputy Premier Peter Ryan, was defeated by the centre-left Labor Party opposition, led by Daniel Andrews. The Greens won two lower house seats, their first Legislative Assembly seats in a Victorian state election, whilst increasing their share of upper house seats. The new Andrews Ministry was sworn in on 4 December 2014.

Voting is compulsory in Victoria. Elections for the Legislative Assembly use instant-runoff voting (called preferential voting in Australia) in single-member electorates (called districts). Elections for the Legislative Council use partial proportional representation, using single transferable vote (also called preferential voting) in multi-member electorates (called regions). Members of the Legislative Council are elected from eight electoral regions each returning five members, making the quota for election in each region 16.67%. The election was conducted by the Victorian Electoral Commission (VEC).

The election marked the first time since 1955 that a Victorian state government had been defeated after only one parliamentary term. Furthermore, the Nationals were reduced to a total of ten seats in the Legislative Assembly and Legislative Council, one short of official status in the legislature. Following the election, both Napthine and Ryan resigned as leaders of the Liberal and National parties, respectively.

== Key dates ==
Terms are fixed at four years unless dissolved earlier by the Governor. The election occurred in line with the fixed-term provisions laid out in the Electoral Act 2002.

Key dates for the election were:

- 4 November: Writs issued by the Governor of Victoria
- 5 November: Opening of nominations for all candidates
- 13 November: Close of nominations for party candidates
- 14 November: Close of nominations for independents
- 29 November: Election day (polls open 8am to 6pm)

== Background ==
The Coalition won the 2010 Victorian state election, winning 45 seats in the 88-member lower house, a swing of 12 seats, defeating the 11-year Labor government which won 43 seats.

Labor suffered a swing of 5.96 percent, a larger swing than the 1992 landslide that brought the Jeff Kennett-led Coalition to power. This led Paul Austin of the Sydney Morning Herald to speculate that Labor was headed for a long period in the political wilderness. However, by 2012, Labor had gradually whittled away a large Coalition advantage in opinion polling. By the time the writs were dropped, Labor had been leading most opinion polls for almost two years, though Andrews consistently trailed as preferred premier.

With a Coalition MP as Speaker, the government operated with a one-seat margin of 44 seats, until the resignation of Geoff Shaw, the member for Frankston, from the Liberal Party on 6 March 2013. This meant the government had only 43 votes on the floor of the parliament, equal to Labor's total. Partly due to Shaw's defection, Premier Ted Baillieu resigned later on 6 March and was succeeded as Liberal leader and Premier by Ports Minister Denis Napthine. Shaw initially guaranteed the Napthine Government support on matters of supply and confidence, allowing it to stay in office as a minority government, although later statements indicated that he had rescinded that earlier statement and was considering assisting an ALP Opposition vote of no confidence in the Napthine administration. If this had happened, his actions could have precipitated an early state election.

The government operated with a two-seat margin in the 40-member upper house where all members are up for re-election every term, with 21 Coalition, 16 Labor and 3 Greens members.

Labor retained seats at the Broadmeadows, Niddrie, Melbourne and Lyndhurst by-elections.

Casual vacancies were created in various Legislative Council seats by the departures of Labor MPs Martin Pakula (Western Metropolitan—who moved to the Legislative Assembly seat of Lyndhurst) and Candy Broad (Northern Victoria), and Liberal MPs Donna Petrovich (Northern Victoria) and Philip Davis (Eastern Victoria). Their seats were filled by Cesar Melhem, Marg Lewis, Amanda Millar, and Andrew Ronalds respectively, each being appointed by a joint sitting of Parliament.

== Registered parties ==
Twenty-one parties were registered with the Victorian Electoral Commission (VEC), and all fielded candidates at the 2014 state election:

- Animal Justice Party
- Australian Christians
- Australian Country Alliance
- Australian Cyclists Party
- Labor Party
- Australian Sex Party
- Democratic Labor Party of Australia
- Family First Party
- Liberal Democratic Party
- Liberal Party
- National Party
- Palmer United Party
- People Power Victoria – No Smart Meters
- Rise Up Australia Party
- Shooters and Fishers Party
- Socialist Alliance
- The Australian Greens
- The Basics Rock'n'Roll Party
- Voice for the West
- Voluntary Euthanasia Party
- Vote 1 Local Jobs

Additionally, two other parties applied for registration prior to the election, but failed to achieve registration by the deadline: No East West Link and Save the Planet.

== Redistribution ==
A redistribution of Victoria's state electoral boundaries took place from 2012 to 2013. The final boundaries were gazetted on 17 October 2013 and were used for the 2014 state election.

Fifteen electorates were abolished, namely Ballarat East (Labor), Ballarat West (Labor), Benalla (Nationals), Clayton (Labor), Derrimut (Labor), Doncaster (Liberal), Keilor (Labor), Kilsyth (Liberal), Lyndhurst (Labor), Mitcham (Liberal), Murray Valley (Nationals), Rodney (Nationals), Scoresby (Liberal), Seymour (Liberal) and Swan Hill (Nationals).

The fifteen new seats are Buninyong (Labor, largely replacing Ballarat East), Clarinda (Labor, largely replacing Clayton), Croydon (Liberal, largely replacing Kilsyth), Eildon (Liberal, combining sections of abolished Seymour with areas of existing Gembrook), Euroa (Nationals, largely replacing Benalla), Keysborough (Labor, largely replacing Lyndhurst), Murray Plains (Nationals, largely replacing Swan Hill and parts of Rodney), Ovens Valley (Nationals, largely replacing Murray Valley), Ringwood (Liberal, largely replacing Mitcham), Rowville (Liberal, largely replacing Scoresby), St Albans (Labor, largely replacing Derrimut), Sunbury (Labor, created from parts of Macedon and Yuroke), Sydenham (Labor, largely replacing Keilor), Wendouree (Liberal, largely replacing Ballarat West), and Werribee (Labor, formed from parts of Lara and Tarneit).

Five electorates changed parties notionally with the new boundaries, including Wendouree, a notional Liberal seat created from the Labor seat of Ballarat West. According to ABC psephologist Antony Green, the Labor-held seats of Bellarine, Monbulk, Ripon and Yan Yean became notionally Liberal. This meant that Labor needed a notional five-seat swing to win government.

== Issues ==
Much of the Labor campaign was focused on the Napthine Government's A$18 billion East West Link toll road project, which Labor opposed, and said it would halt if it won power. In early November Prime Minister Tony Abbott, in one of his few Victorian appearances for the Liberals during the campaign, described the election as "a referendum on the East West Link". Public transport also featured strongly during the campaign, with the parties presenting rival inner-city rail tunnel projects and competing plans to remove railway level crossings to ease road congestion.

With unemployment at its highest level since 2001, jobs and the economy became a key issue and both sides promised major job creation schemes: the Coalition said it would create 200,000 jobs over five years and Labor said it would create 100,000 jobs within two years. Other major issues raised during the election were the long-running Ambulance Victoria industrial dispute and slow ambulance response times, urban planning laws, education and law and order. Both major parties promised to build new and bigger hospitals.

Labor election advertising aimed to capitalise on the unpopularity of Australia's Liberal Prime Minister and unpopular federal Liberal policies, while much of the Coalition advertising depicted Andrews as a leader with close ties to the Construction, Forestry, Mining and Energy Union.

On environmental issues neither the Coalition nor Labor presented comprehensive policies, although Labor promised to repeal some of the Coalition's legislation, such as on cattle grazing in the Alpine National Park and leases in national parks. A key topic was the proposal for a new Great Forest National Park, that was opposed by the Coalition and was not supported by Labor. The Greens supported the new park, as well as stronger action on climate change and phase-out of coal fired power stations.

The only state leaders debate between Napthine and Andrews was held on 19 November on the pay TV Sky News Australia. Only pay television subscribers could watch it.

== Candidates and retiring MPs ==
As the close of nominations on 14 November 2014, there were a total of 896 candidates in the election (a 26 per cent increase to the 711 candidates in the 2010 election). There were 545 candidates contesting the 88 seats of the Victorian Legislative Assembly (up from 501, an 8.6 per cent increase); and 351 candidates contesting the 40 seats in the Legislative Council (up from 206, a 68 per cent increase). Labor and the Greens contested every electorate. There were 92 candidates from the Liberal–National Coalition for the lower house, with four "three-cornered contests" where both Liberal and National candidates contested the same seat (Buninyong, Eildon, Euroa and Ripon).

=== Retiring MPs ===
Members who chose not to renominate are as follows:

==== Labor ====
- Ann Barker MLA (Oakleigh) – announced 25 November 2013
- Liz Beattie MLA (Yuroke) – announced 25 November 2013
- Christine Campbell MLA (Pascoe Vale) – announced 13 November 2013
- Joanne Duncan MLA (Macedon) – announced 4 November 2013
- Joe Helper MLA (Ripon) – announced 3 December 2012
- Justin Madden MLA (Essendon) – announced 15 November 2013
- John Pandazopoulos MLA (Dandenong) – announced 26 November 2013
- Ian Trezise MLA (Geelong) – announced 3 February 2014
- Kaye Darveniza MLC (Northern Victoria) – announced 29 November 2013
- John Lenders MLC (Southern Metropolitan) – announced 18 November 2013
- Marg Lewis MLC (Northern Victoria) – appointed to a casual vacancy but did not contest preselection
- Johan Scheffer MLC (Eastern Victoria)
- Matt Viney MLC (Eastern Victoria) – announced 15 November 2013

==== Liberal ====
- Ted Baillieu MLA (Hawthorn) – announced 22 August 2014
- Nicholas Kotsiras MLA (Bulleen) – announced 12 January 2014
- Andrew McIntosh MLA (Kew) – announced 17 December 2013
- Ken Smith MLA (Bass) – announced 13 January 2014
- Andrea Coote MLC (Southern Metropolitan) – announced 19 January 2014
- David Koch MLC (Western Victoria) – announced 14 March 2014
- Jan Kronberg MLC (Eastern Metropolitan) – announced 19 March 2014

==== National ====
- Hugh Delahunty MLA (Lowan) – announced 10 February 2014
- Jeanette Powell MLA (Shepparton) – announced 8 February 2014
- Bill Sykes MLA (Benalla) – announced 9 January 2014

== Opinion polling ==
View source data.
View source data.

=== Voting intention ===
Legislative Assembly (lower house) polling
Date	Firm	Primary vote					TPP vote
Date	Firm	LIB	NAT	ALP	GRN	OTH	L/NP	ALP
29 Nov 2014 election		36.46%	5.53%	38.1%	11.48%	8.42%	48.01%	51.99%
25–28 Nov 2014	Ipsos	42%*		35%	15%	8%	48%	52%
24–27 Nov 2014	Newspoll	36%	4%	39%	12%	9%	48%	52%
27 Nov 2014	ReachTEL	34.5%	5.2%	38.3%	13.5%	8.5%	48%	52%
26–27 Nov 2014	Roy Morgan	44%*		36%	13.5%	6.5%	50%	50%
25–26 Nov 2014	Galaxy	40%*		39%	13%	8%	48%	52%
7–24 Nov 2014	Essential	40%*		39%	13%	8%	47%	53%
21–24 Nov 2014	Roy Morgan	39.5%*		33.5%	17.5%	9.5%	48%	52%
19–20 Nov 2014	Roy Morgan	35%*		35.5%	19.5%	10%	45%	55%
18–19 Nov 2014	Galaxy	35%	5%	39%	13%	8%	48%	52%
7–10 Nov 2014	Roy Morgan	38%*		36%	18.5%	7.5%	46.5%	53.5%
6–9 Nov 2014	Ipsos	39%*		39%	16%	8%	44%	56%
27–30 Oct 2014	Newspoll	35%	4%	41%	13%	7%	46%	54%
24–27 Oct 2014	Roy Morgan	37.5%*		34%	18.5%	10%	47.5%	52.5%
23–26 Oct 2014	Ipsos	39%*		37%	17%	9%	44%	56%
23 Oct 2014	ReachTEL	34.7%	3.9%	37.5%	13.3%	10.5%	47%	53%
22–24 Oct 2014	Galaxy	35%	5%	38%	13%	9%	48%	52%
26–29 Sep 2014	Roy Morgan	37.5%*		34%	18%	10.5%	46%	54%
14–15 Aug 2014	Galaxy	35%	5%	38%	12%	10%	48%	52%
Jul–Aug 2014	Newspoll	32%	3%	37%	16%	12%	45%	55%
May–Jun 2014	Newspoll	33%	4%	38%	16%	9%	46%	54%
26–27 Feb 2014	Galaxy	37%	5%	39%	12%	7%	49%	51%
Jan–Feb 2014	Newspoll	35%	3%	39%	13%	10%	47%	53%
21 Nov 2013	ReachTEL	39.1%	4.3%	35.8%	11%	9.9%	—
Sep–Oct 2013	Newspoll	36%	3%	38%	14%	9%	47%	53%
Jul–Aug 2013	Newspoll	37%	4%	38%	13%	8%	49%	51%
May–Jun 2013	Newspoll	40%	3%	35%	12%	10%	51%	49%
30 May 2013	ReachTEL	37.9%	5.7%	32.5%	13.6%	10.4%	—
12 Apr 2013	ReachTEL	45.2%	4.3%	35.3%	11.5%	3.8%	—
Mar–Apr 2013	Newspoll	38%	5%	37%	12%	8%	50%	50%
7 Mar 2013	ReachTEL	40.1%	4.8%	36.9%	12.3%	6%	—
6 March 2013 Denis Napthine becomes Liberal leader and Victorian Premier
22 Feb 2013	ReachTEL	37.6%	6.6%	34.9%	12.6%	8.2%	—
Jan–Feb 2013	Newspoll	35%	4%	38%	13%	10%	47%	53%
25 Jan 2013	ReachTEL	34.4%	3.5%	36.8%	12.4%	13.1%	—
Nov–Dec 2012	Newspoll	33%	3%	38%	16%	10%	45%	55%
Sep–Oct 2012	Newspoll	35%	2%	41%	13%	9%	45%	55%
Jul–Aug 2012	Newspoll	37%	4%	35%	13%	11%	50%	50%
5–13 June 2012	Roy Morgan	44.5%*		33.5%	15.5%	6.5%	52%	48%
Mar–Apr 2012	Newspoll	37%	5%	32%	17%	9%	51%	49%
20–28 Mar 2012	Roy Morgan	45.5%*		35.5%	12.5%	6.5%	53%	47%
Jan–Feb 2012	Newspoll	42%	3%	33%	14%	8%	53%	47%
Nov–Dec 2011	Newspoll	40%	3%	34%	15%	8%	51%	49%
Sep–Oct 2011	Newspoll	43%	4%	30%	15%	8%	55%	45%
Jul–Aug 2011	Newspoll	44%	4%	28%	15%	9%	57%	43%
5–10 Apr 2011	Roy Morgan	48%*		31%	11.5%	9.5%	57%	43%
3 December 2010 Daniel Andrews becomes Labor leader and leader of the opposition
30 Nov – 1 Dec 2010	Roy Morgan	46%*		32%	14%	8%	57%	43%
27 Nov 2010 election		38.0%	6.7%	36.3%	11.2%	7.8%	51.6%	48.4%
23–25 Nov 2010	Newspoll	40%	5%	33%	15%	7%	51.1%	48.9%
22–25 Nov 2010	Roy Morgan	44.5%*		35.5%	13%	7%	51%	49%
* Indicates a combined Liberal/National primary vote.
Newspoll polling is published in The Australian and sourced from here

=== Better Premier and satisfaction polling ===
View source data.
Graphical summary of polling for Better Premier
View source data.
Graphical summary of approval ratings for Ted Baillieu and Denis Napthine as Premiers
View source data.
Graphical summary of approval ratings for Daniel Andrews as Leader of the Opposition

Better Premier and satisfaction polling*
Date	Firm	Better Premier		Napthine		Andrews
Date	Firm	Napthine	Andrews	Satisfied	Dissatisfied	Satisfied	Dissatisfied
25–28 Nov 2014	Ipsos	44%	42%	49%	40%	42%	43%
24–27 Nov 2014	Newspoll	41%	37%	41%	45%	38%	43%
26–27 Nov 2014	Roy Morgan	50.5%	49.5%	not asked
25–26 Nov 2014	Galaxy	41%	38%	not asked
21–24 Nov 2014	Roy Morgan	51.5%	48.5%	not asked
19–20 Nov 2014	Roy Morgan	47.5%	52.5%	not asked
18–19 Nov 2014	Galaxy	42%	30%	not asked
7–10 Nov 2014	Roy Morgan	51.5%	48.5%	not asked
6–9 Nov 2014	Ipsos	42%	39%	46%	37%	40%	37%
27–30 Oct 2014	Newspoll	47%	33%	46%	41%	36%	45%
24–27 Oct 2014	Roy Morgan	52%	48%	not asked
23–26 Oct 2014	Ipsos	45%	36%	47%	38%	37%	42%
22–24 Oct 2014	Galaxy	43%	27%	not asked
26–29 Sep 2014	Roy Morgan	51%	49%	not asked
14–15 Aug 2014	Galaxy	41%	33%	not asked
Jul–Aug 2014	Newspoll	41%	31%	40%	43%	32%	41%
May–Jun 2014	Newspoll	42%	29%	44%	40%	35%	37%
26–27 Feb 2014	Galaxy	40%	32%	not asked
Jan–Feb 2014	Newspoll	39%	28%	43%	35%	32%	33%
21–Nov 2013	ReachTEL†	47.5%	52.5%	not asked
Sep–Oct 2013	Newspoll	41%	27%	42%	36%	35%	31%
Jul–Aug 2013	Newspoll	47%	25%	53%	31%	38%	32%
May–Jun 2013	Newspoll	49%	26%	53%	26%	35%	34%
30–May 2013	ReachTEL†	51.6%	48.4%	not asked
12–Apr 2013	ReachTEL†	52%	48%	not asked
Mar–Apr 2013	Newspoll	43%	24%	50%	19%	42%	28%
7–Mar 2013	ReachTEL†	46.5%	53.5%	not asked
6 March 2013 Napthine replaces Baillieu		Baillieu	Andrews	Baillieu		Andrews
22–Feb 2013	ReachTEL†	41.3%	58.7%	not asked
Jan–Feb 2013	Newspoll	38%	31%	31%	53%	30%	36%
25–Jan 2013	ReachTEL†	44.4%	55.6%	not asked
Nov–Dec 2012	Newspoll	39%	30%	33%	48%	32%	34%
Sep–Oct 2012	Newspoll	39%	30%	31%	53%	29%	36%
Jul–Aug 2012	Newspoll	40%	26%	32%	50%	28%	36%
5–13 June 2012	Roy Morgan	41%	33.5%	29%	53.5%	28%	35%
Mar–Apr 2012	Newspoll	46%	23%	36%	45%	28%	35%
20–28 Mar 2012	Roy Morgan	53.5%	22%	40%	38%	20%	36%
Jan–Feb 2012	Newspoll	51%	19%	41%	38%	23%	36%
Nov–Dec 2011	Newspoll	53%	18%	49%	33%	30%	32%
Sep–Oct 2011	Newspoll	56%	19%	52%	29%	29%	33%
Jul–Aug 2011	Newspoll	57%	16%	52%	29%	27%	34%
5–10 Apr 2011	Roy Morgan	60%	14%	50.5%	23%	25%	26.5%
3 December 2010 Andrews replaces Brumby		Baillieu	Brumby	Baillieu		Brumby
30 Nov – 1 Dec 2010	Roy Morgan	48.5%	25.5%	40%	13%	30%	31%
27 Nov 2010 election		–	–	–	–	–	–
23–25 Nov 2010	Newspoll	38%	48%	44%	44%	38%	52%
23–25 Nov 2010	Roy Morgan	39%	43.5%	40%	39%	34%	46.5%
* Remainder were "uncommitted" or "other/neither". † Participants were forced to choose.
Newspoll polling is published in The Australian and sourced from here

Polling that is conducted by Newspoll and published in The Australian is conducted via random telephone number selection in city and country areas. Sampling sizes usually consist of around 1100–1200 electors. The declared margin of error is ±3 percentage points.

== Newspaper endorsements ==
Dailies		Sundays	
Newspaper	Endorsement	Newspaper	Endorsement
The Age	Liberal	The Sunday Age	Labor
The Australian	Liberal		
The Australian Financial Review	Liberal		
Herald Sun	Liberal	Sunday Herald Sun	Liberal

== Results ==
=== Legislative Assembly ===
Winning party by electorate.

Composition of the Legislative Assembly following the 2014 election Government Labor (47) Opposition Liberal (30) National (8) Crossbench Greens (2) Independent (1)

Party	Votes	%	+/–	Seats	+/–
Labor	1,278,436	38.10	▲1.84	47	▲4*
Liberal	1,223,663	36.47	▼1.57	30	▼5
Greens	385,240	11.48	▲0.27	2	▲2
Nationals	185,619	5.53	▼1.21	8	▼2
Independents	112,289	3.35	▲0.74	1	▲1
Country Alliance	43,052	1.28	▼0.07	0	Steady
Family First	37,194	1.11	▼1.18	0	Steady
Christians	26,560	0.79	New	0	New
Rise Up Australia	20,795	0.62	New	0	New
Voice for the West	16,584	0.49	New	0	New
Sex Party	8,930	0.27	▼0.28	0	Steady
Animal Justice	7,778	0.23	New	0	New
Democratic Labour	2,799	0.08	▼0.81	0	Steady
Shooters and Fishers	2,622	0.08	▲0.08	–	–
Socialist Alliance	1,728	0.05	Steady	0	Steady
People Power Victoria	1,375	0.04	New	0	New
The Basics Rock 'n' Roll	1,043	0.03	New	0	–
Total	3,355,707	100.00	–	88	–
Valid votes	3,355,707	94.78			
Invalid/blank votes	184,838	5.22	▲0.26		
Total votes	3,540,545	100.00	–		
Registered voters/turnout	3,806,301	93.02	▲0.06		
Two-party-preferred
Labor	1,745,194	51.99	▲3.57		
Liberal/National	1,611,715	48.01	▼3.57		
Total	3,356,909	100.00	–		

*Labor also retained four of the five Labor seats which were made notionally Liberal by the 2013 redistribution.

=== Legislative Council ===
Upper house seat outcome of the 2014 Victorian state election

Party	Votes	%	+/–	Seats	+/–
Labor	1,143,883	33.46	▼1.90	14	▼2
Liberal (metropolitan)	711,718	20.82	▼3.83	10	▼2
Liberal/National (joint ticket)	523,510	15.31	▼3.20	–	–
Liberal (country)				4	▼2
National				2	▼1
Greens	367,625	10.75	▼1.25	5	▲2
Liberal Democrats	104,516	3.06	▲3.06	0	Steady
Sex Party	89,748	2.63	▲0.71	1	▲1
Democratic Labour	79,308	2.32	▼0.02	1	▲1
Palmer United	66,679	1.95	New	0	New
Family First	62,431	1.83	▼1.03	0	Steady
Animal Justice	58,133	1.70	New	0	New
Shooters and Fishers	56,536	1.65	▲0.08	2	▲2
Christians	35,164	1.03	New	0	New
Country Alliance	23,164	0.68	▼0.97	0	Steady
Cyclists	20,703	0.61	New	0	New
Rise Up Australia	17,674	0.52	New	0	New
Voluntary Euthanasia	16,772	0.49	New	0	New
People Power Victoria	12,022	0.35	New	0	New
Voice for the West	11,064	0.32	New	0	New
Vote 1 Local Jobs	7,108	0.21	New	1	New
The Basics Rock 'n' Roll	6,340	0.19	New	0	New
Independents	4,573	0.13	▼0.20	0	Steady
Total	3,418,671	100.00	–	40	–
Valid votes	3,418,671	96.57			
Invalid/blank votes	121,497	3.43	▲0.05		
Total votes	3,540,168	100.00	–		
Registered voters/turnout	3,806,301	93.01	▲0.08		

Legislative Council seats

Legislative Council Region	Seats held
Eastern Metropolitan Region	
Eastern Victoria Region	
Northern Metropolitan Region	
Northern Victoria Region	
South Eastern Metropolitan Region	
Southern Metropolitan Region	
Western Metropolitan Region	
Western Victoria Region	

Labor
Liberal
National
Green
Shooters, Fishers and Farmers
Sex Party
Democratic Labour
Vote 1 Local Jobs

=== Seats changing hands ===
Following the election, the seats of Frankston and Prahran were initially too close to call, with around a hundred votes separating candidates. Prahran was a three-way contest between Labor, Liberal, and the Greens, and this seat proved to be the tightest contest among all the lower house seats. The VEC declared Prahran had been won by the Greens on 9 December, whereby the Greens overtook the ALP from third place, to defeat the Liberal incumbent in the final distribution of preferences. The Greens' win was confirmed in the recount held the following day.

Seats changing hands
Seat	Pre-2014			Swing	Post-2014		
Seat	Party	Member	Margin*	Swing	Margin	Member	Party
Bentleigh	Liberal	Elizabeth Miller	0.9	1.7	0.8	Nick Staikos	Labor
Carrum	Liberal	Donna Bauer	0.3	1.0	0.7	Sonya Kilkenny	Labor
Frankston	Independent	Geoff Shaw	0.4	0.9	0.5	Paul Edbrooke	Labor
Melbourne	Labor	Jennifer Kanis	4.7	7.1	2.4	Ellen Sandell	Greens
Mordialloc	Liberal	Lorraine Wreford	1.5	3.6	2.1	Tim Richardson	Labor
Prahran	Liberal	Clem Newton-Brown	4.7	5.1	0.4	Sam Hibbins	Greens
Shepparton	National	Jeanette Powell	25.9	28.5	2.6	Suzanna Sheed	Independent
* This margin is notional, being calculated by Antony Green to take account of the 2013 redistribution. As such, it may vary from 2010 election results.

The seats of Bellarine, Monbulk, Ripon, and Yan Yean were won by Labor at the 2010 election, but redistributions in 2013 made them notionally Liberal seats. Similarly, the redistribution largely replaced Ballarat West with Wendouree; Ballarat West was also won by Labor at the 2010 election, but notionally Liberal post-redistribution.

Seat	2010 election			2013 redistribution			Swing	2014 election		
Seat	Party	Member	Margin	Party	Member	Margin	Swing	Margin	Member	Party
Bellarine	Labor	Lisa Neville	1.4	Liberal	Notional	2.5	8.0	5.5	Lisa Neville	Labor
Monbulk	Labor	James Merlino	1.9	Liberal	Notional	1.1	6.0	4.9	James Merlino	Labor
Ripon	Labor	Joe Helper	2.7	Liberal	Notional	1.6	−0.6	1.0	Louise Staley	Liberal
Wendouree	Labor	Sharon Knight*	1.1	Liberal	New seat	0.1	6.0	5.9	Sharon Knight	Labor
Yan Yean	Labor	Danielle Green	4.1	Liberal	Notional	0.1	3.4	3.3	Danielle Green	Labor
* Sharon Knight held the abolished seat of Ballarat West, which was largely replaced with Wendouree by the redistribution.

== Election validity court challenge ==
In January 2015, unsuccessful Palmer United Party candidate Maria Rigoni petitioned the Supreme Court of Victoria to declare the 2014 election invalid, alleging that the Victorian Electoral Commission had breached the Electoral Act whilst conducting the election. Rigoni argued that the unprecedented high level of early voting demonstrated that the VEC had not applied or enforced the rule requiring applicants for an early or postal votes to declare a valid reason to an electoral officer that they were unable to vote on polling day.

Lawyers acting for the VEC asked the court to dismiss the case as an abuse of process, however Justice Jack Forrest disagreed, and set the case to proceed to trial on 25 February 2015. On 24 March, Justice Gregory Garde of the Supreme Court of Victoria dismissed Rigoni's case, ruling that there was no evidence presented to the court that the VEC's early voting procedures had any effect on the result.
