= Electoral results for the district of Bentleigh =

Victoria, Australia, district election results

This is a list of electoral results for the electoral district of Bentleigh in Victorian state elections.

== Members for Bentleigh ==
Member	Party	Term
Bob Suggett	Liberal	1967–1979
Gordon Hockley	Labor	1979–1988
Ann Barker	Labor	1988–1992
Inga Peulich	Liberal	1992–2002
Rob Hudson	Labor	2002–2010
Elizabeth Miller	Liberal	2010–2014
Nick Staikos	Labor	2014–present

== Election results ==
=== Elections in the 2020s ===
2022 Victorian state election: Bentleigh
Party	Candidate	Votes	%	±%
Labor	Nick Staikos	20,656	45.8	−3.9
Liberal	Debbie Taylor-Haynes	16,401	36.3	+3.0
Greens	Alana Galli-McRostie	4,845	10.7	+2.5
Family First	Paul Ryan	1,331	2.9	+2.9
Animal Justice	David Harris	1,098	2.4	+0.7
Ind. (Fusion)	Simon Gnieslaw	789	1.7	+1.7
Total formal votes		45,120	97.0	+3.2
Informal votes		1,408	3.0	−3.2
Turnout		46,528	90.5	−0.5
Two-party-preferred result
Labor	Nick Staikos	26,153	58.0	−3.4
Liberal	Debbie Taylor-Haynes	18,972	42.0	+3.4
Labor hold		Swing	−3.4	

=== Elections in the 2010s ===
2018 Victorian state election: Bentleigh
Party	Candidate	Votes	%	±%
Labor	Nick Staikos	18,385	50.2	+11.6
Liberal	Asher Judah	12,192	33.3	−12.6
Greens	Sarah Dekiere	2,751	7.5	−3.1
Independent	Oscar Lobo	750	2.1	+2.1
Animal Justice	Naren Chellappah	704	1.9	+1.9
Justice	Ellie Jean Sullivan	571	1.6	+1.6
Reason	Dave Stott	449	1.2	−0.7
Democratic Labor	Fi Fraser	409	1.1	+1.1
Sustainable Australia	Hans Verzijl	312	0.9	+0.9
Independent	George Mavroyeni	92	0.3	+0.3
Total formal votes		36,615	93.8	−1.0
Informal votes		2,399	6.2	+1.0
Turnout		39,014	91.2	−2.4
Two-party-preferred result
Labor	Nick Staikos	22,732	61.9	+11.1
Liberal	Asher Judah	13,986	38.1	−11.1
Labor hold		Swing	+11.1	

2014 Victorian state election: Bentleigh
Party	Candidate	Votes	%	±%
Liberal	Elizabeth Miller	16,669	45.9	−1.4
Labor	Nick Staikos	14,025	38.6	+0.1
Greens	Sean Mulcahy	3,842	10.6	−0.4
Sex Party	Ross McCawley	688	1.9	+1.9
Family First	David Clark	451	1.2	+0.2
Independent	Chandra Ojha	271	0.7	+0.7
People Power Victoria	Sofia Telemzouguer	260	0.7	+0.7
Rise Up Australia	Kelley Moldovan	124	0.3	+0.3
Total formal votes		36,330	94.8	−0.9
Informal votes		2,010	5.2	+0.9
Turnout		38,340	93.6	+2.6
Two-party-preferred result
Labor	Nick Staikos	18,449	50.8	+1.7
Liberal	Elizabeth Miller	17,881	49.2	−1.7
Labor gain from Liberal		Swing	+1.7	

2010 Victorian state election: Bentleigh
Party	Candidate	Votes	%	±%
Liberal	Elizabeth Miller	16,296	47.00	+7.33
Labor	Rob Hudson	13,643	39.35	−7.64
Greens	Brett Hedger	3,545	10.22	+0.03
Democratic Labor	Julian Coutts	524	1.51	+1.51
Family First	Lex Graber	364	1.05	−1.67
Independent	John Myers	300	0.87	+0.87
Total formal votes		34,672	95.55	−0.55
Informal votes		1,615	4.45	+0.55
Turnout		36,287	93.73	−0.26
Two-party-preferred result
Liberal	Elizabeth Miller	17,612	50.63	+6.95
Labor	Rob Hudson	17,171	49.37	−6.95
Liberal gain from Labor		Swing	+6.95	

=== Elections in the 2000s ===
2006 Victorian state election: Bentleigh
Party	Candidate	Votes	%	±%
Labor	Rob Hudson	15,811	46.99	−0.64
Liberal	James Gobbo	13,347	39.67	−2.37
Greens	Peter D'Arcy	3,428	10.19	+0.67
Family First	Michael Portelli	916	2.72	+2.72
Citizens Electoral Council	Colin Horne	144	0.43	−0.38
Total formal votes		33,646	96.10	−0.90
Informal votes		1,365	3.90	+0.90
Turnout		35,011	93.99	−0.01
Two-party-preferred result
Labor	Rob Hudson	18,950	56.32	+1.58
Liberal	James Gobbo	14,696	43.68	−1.58
Labor hold		Swing	+1.58	

2002 Victorian state election: Bentleigh
Party	Candidate	Votes	%	±%
Labor	Rob Hudson	15,983	47.6	+3.4
Liberal	Inga Peulich	14,105	42.0	−8.0
Greens	Penny Mitchell	3,195	9.5	+6.1
Citizens Electoral Council	Simon Hall	271	0.8	+0.8
Total formal votes		33,554	97.0	−0.2
Informal votes		1,039	3.0	+0.2
Turnout		34,593	94.0	+0.3
Two-party-preferred result
Labor	Rob Hudson	18,368	54.7	+6.6
Liberal	Inga Peulich	15,186	45.3	−6.6
Labor gain from Liberal		Swing	+6.6	

=== Elections in the 1990s ===
1999 Victorian state election: Bentleigh
Party	Candidate	Votes	%	±%
Liberal	Inga Peulich	15,679	49.9	−3.9
Labor	Cartha Maloney	13,831	44.0	+0.1
Greens	Nick Brunton	1,139	3.6	+3.6
Democratic Labor	Gail King	492	1.6	+1.6
Independent	Marcus Barber	296	0.9	+0.9
Total formal votes		31,437	97.3	−0.7
Informal votes		865	2.7	+0.7
Turnout		32,302	93.7	−1.4
Two-party-preferred result
Liberal	Inga Peulich	16,300	51.9	−2.8
Labor	Cartha Maloney	15,090	48.1	+2.8
Liberal hold		Swing	−2.8	

1996 Victorian state election: Bentleigh
Party	Candidate	Votes	%	±%
Liberal	Inga Peulich	16,957	53.7	+1.1
Labor	Cartha Maloney	13,839	43.9	+7.1
Natural Law	John Cordon	759	2.4	+2.4
Total formal votes		31,555	98.0	+1.5
Informal votes		636	2.0	−1.5
Turnout		32,191	95.1	+0.1
Two-party-preferred result
Liberal	Inga Peulich	17,247	54.7	−3.5
Labor	Cartha Maloney	14,280	45.3	+3.5
Liberal hold		Swing	−3.5	

1992 Victorian state election: Bentleigh
Party	Candidate	Votes	%	±%
Liberal	Inga Peulich	16,197	52.6	+9.4
Labor	Ann Barker	11,316	36.8	−8.8
Independent	John Little	2,037	6.6	+6.6
Independent	Greg Alabaster	1,036	3.4	+3.4
Independent	David James	184	0.6	+0.6
Total formal votes		30,770	96.5	+0.6
Informal votes		1,115	3.5	−0.6
Turnout		31,885	95.0	
Two-party-preferred result
Liberal	Inga Peulich	17,856	58.2	+9.7
Labor	Ann Barker	12,843	41.8	−9.7
Liberal gain from Labor		Swing	+9.7	

=== Elections in the 1980s ===
1988 Victorian state election: Bentleigh
Party	Candidate	Votes	%	±%
Labor	Ann Barker	11,444	44.60	−5.51
Liberal	Peter Norman	11,130	43.41	−6.48
Democrats	Anne Martin	902	3.52	+3.52
Weekend Trading Party	Frank Penhalluriack	830	3.23	+3.23
Independent	Alan Salter	536	2.09	+2.09
Call to Australia	Phillip McGibbony	480	1.87	+1.87
Independent	Janette de San Sinforiano	329	1.28	+1.28
Total formal votes		25,660	95.88	−1.59
Informal votes		1,103	4.12	+1.59
Turnout		26,763	93.57	−0.70
Two-party-preferred result
Labor	Ann Barker	13,175	51.36	+1.25
Liberal	Peter Norman	12,475	48.64	−1.25
Labor hold		Swing	+1.25	

1985 Victorian state election: Bentleigh
Party	Candidate	Votes	%	±%
Labor	Gordon Hockley	13,758	50.1	+0.2
Liberal	Peter Norman	13,696	49.9	+8.0
Total formal votes		27,454	97.5	
Informal votes		713	2.5	
Turnout		28,167	94.3	
Labor hold		Swing	−4.4	

1982 Victorian state election: Bentleigh
Party	Candidate	Votes	%	±%
Labor	Gordon Hockley	13,055	51.0	+0.8
Liberal	Ronald Turner	10,477	40.9	−8.9
Democrats	Brian Kidd	1,397	5.5	+5.5
Independent	William Horner	682	2.7	+2.7
Total formal votes		25,605	97.8	+0.6
Informal votes		577	2.2	−0.6
Turnout		26,182	95.7	+0.6
Two-party-preferred result
Labor	Gordon Hockley	14,199	55.4	+5.2
Liberal	Ronald Turner	11,412	44.6	−5.2
Labor hold		Swing	+5.2	

=== Elections in the 1970s ===
1979 Victorian state election: Bentleigh
Party	Candidate	Votes	%	±%
Labor	Gordon Hockley	12,949	50.2	+11.3
Liberal	Bob Suggett	12,853	49.8	−3.0
Total formal votes		25,802	97.2	−0.8
Informal votes		736	2.8	+0.8
Turnout		26,538	95.1	+0.9
Labor gain from Liberal		Swing	+9.5	

1976 Victorian state election: Bentleigh
Party	Candidate	Votes	%	±%
Liberal	Bob Suggett	14,183	52.8	+0.1
Labor	Lindsay Thomas	10,434	38.9	−0.3
Democratic Labor	Peter Madden	1,532	5.7	−2.3
Workers	John Stoker	693	2.6	+2.6
Total formal votes		26,842	98.0	
Informal votes		539	2.0	
Turnout		27,381	94.2	
Two-party-preferred result
Liberal	Bob Suggett	15,917	59.3	−0.6
Labor	Lindsay Thomas	10,925	40.7	+0.6
Liberal hold		Swing	−0.6	

1973 Victorian state election: Bentleigh
Party	Candidate	Votes	%	±%
Liberal	Bob Suggett	13,944	52.4	+9.0
Labor	Alexander McDonald	10,454	39.3	+1.5
Democratic Labor	Peter Madden	2,226	8.4	−2.4
Total formal votes		26,624	98.0	+1.3
Informal votes		529	2.0	−1.3
Turnout		27,153	94.7	−0.8
Two-party-preferred result
Liberal	Bob Suggett	15,830	59.5	+0.8
Labor	Alexander McDonald	10,794	40.5	−0.8
Liberal hold		Swing	+0.8	

1970 Victorian state election: Bentleigh
Party	Candidate	Votes	%	±%
Liberal	Bob Suggett	10,689	43.4	+5.4
Labor	Kenneth Williams	9,311	37.8	+4.3
Democratic Labor	Peter Madden	2,655	10.8	+0.1
Independent	Noel Allen	1,237	5.0	+5.0
Independent	Mary Ovenden	719	2.9	+2.9
Total formal votes		24,611	96.7	−0.9
Informal votes		838	3.3	+0.9
Turnout		25,449	95.5	+0.6
Two-party-preferred result
Liberal	Bob Suggett	14,452	58.7	−3.5
Labor	Kenneth Williams	10,159	41.3	+3.5
Liberal hold		Swing	−3.5	

=== Elections in the 1960s ===
1967 Victorian state election: Bentleigh
Party	Candidate	Votes	%	±%
Liberal	Bob Suggett	9,184	38.0	−11.0
Labor	Alexander McDonald	8,095	33.5	−3.9
Independent	Harold Stevens	4,305	17.8	+17.8
Democratic Labor	Robert Semmel	2,576	10.7	−2.9
Total formal votes		24,160	97.6	
Informal votes		584	2.4	
Turnout		24,744	94.9	
Two-party-preferred result
Liberal	Bob Suggett	15,018	62.2	+1.6
Labor	Alexander McDonald	9,142	37.8	−1.6
Liberal hold		Swing	+1.6	
