= Results of the 2010 Victorian state election (Legislative Assembly) =

Australian state election results

Victorian state election, 27 November 2010 Legislative Assembly << 2006–2014 >>
Enrolled voters	3,582,232				
Votes cast	3,329,865		Turnout	92.96	+0.23
Informal votes	165,134		Informal	4.96	+0.40
Summary of votes by party
Party	Primary votes	%	Swing	Seats	Change
Liberal	1,203,654	38.03	+3.59	35	+12
Labor	1,147,348	36.25	–6.81	43	–12
Greens	354,697	11.21	+1.17	0	±0
National	213,492	6.75	+1.58	10	+1
Family First	72,354	2.29	–2.00	0	±0
Country Alliance	42,938	1.36	+1.36	0	±0
Democratic Labor	28,176	0.89	+0.89	0	±0
Sex Party	17,252	0.55	+0.55	0	±0
Socialist Alliance	1,787	0.06	+0.02	0	±0
Christian Democrats	636	0.02	+0.02	0	±0
Other	82,395	2.60	+0.31	0	–1
Total	3,164,729			88	
Two-party-preferred
Liberal/National	1,633,312	51.58	+5.97		
Labor	1,533,225	48.42	–5.97		

This is a list of electoral district results for the Victorian 2010 election for the Legislative Assembly.

== Results by electoral district ==
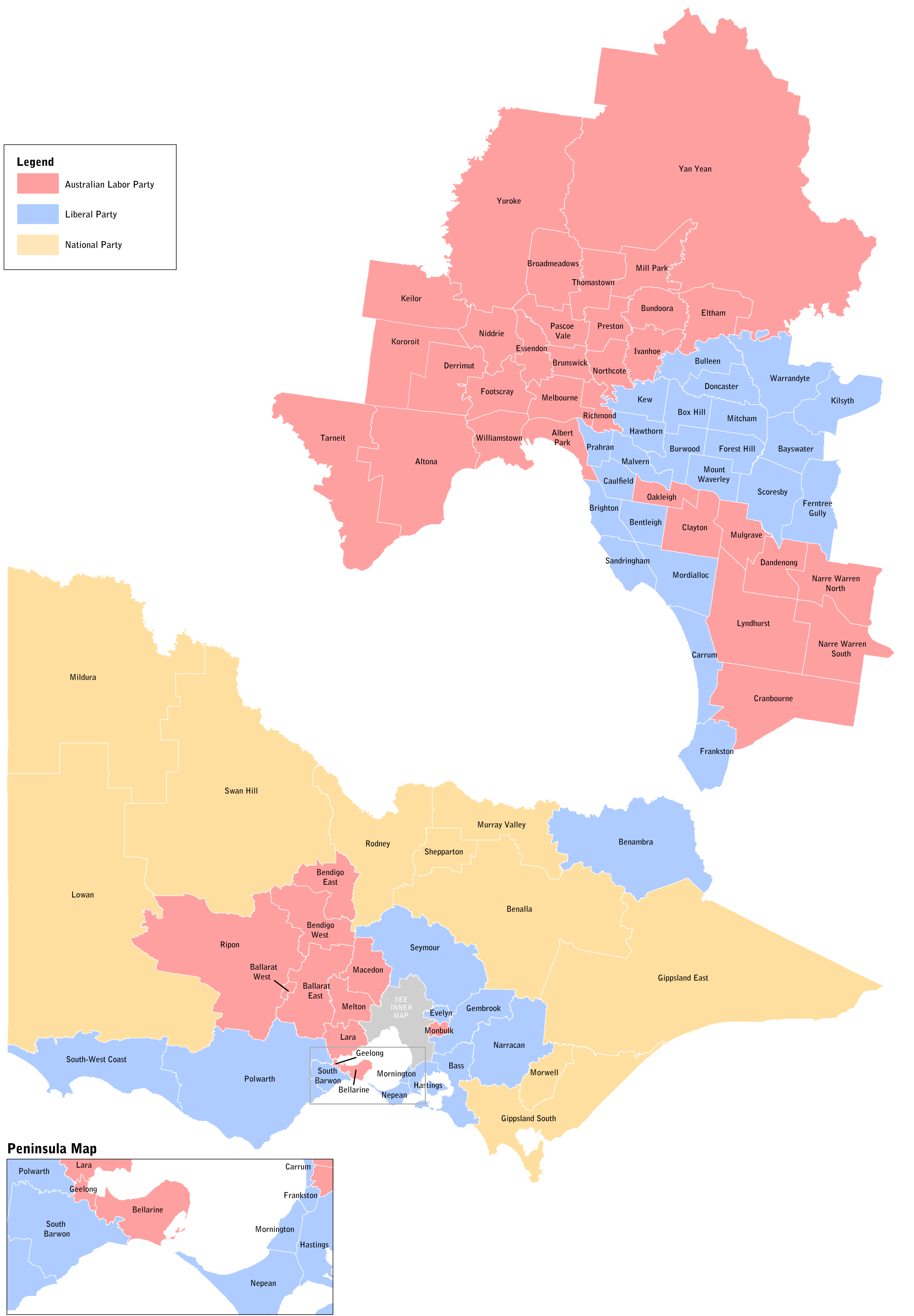
Lower house seat outcome of the Victorian 2010 election

=== Albert Park ===
2010 Victorian state election: Albert Park
Party	Candidate	Votes	%	±%
Liberal	Mark Lopez	15,234	38.29	+3.65
Labor	Martin Foley	12,012	30.19	−10.86
Greens	Ann Birrell	7,218	18.14	−0.93
Independent	Serge Thomann	3,619	9.10	+9.10
Sex Party	Katie Blakey	1,404	3.53	+3.53
Family First	Josie Young	303	0.76	−0.32
Total formal votes		39,790	96.21	+0.54
Informal votes		1,568	3.79	−0.54
Turnout		41,358	87.72	+2.00
Two-party-preferred result
Labor	Martin Foley	20,713	52.06	−7.63
Liberal	Mark Lopez	19,077	47.94	+7.63
Labor hold		Swing	−7.63	

=== Altona ===
2010 Victorian state election: Altona
Party	Candidate	Votes	%	±%
Labor	Jill Hennessy	22,954	51.02	–9.59
Liberal	Mark Rose	14,944	33.22	+9.33
Greens	David Strangward	4,516	10.04	+1.62
Family First	Elizabeth Mumby	1,582	3.52	–3.56
Independent	Brijender Nain	991	2.20	+2.20
Total formal votes		44,987	94.68	+0.79
Informal votes		2,529	5.32	–0.79
Turnout		47,516	92.92	–0.77
Two-party-preferred result
Labor	Jill Hennessy	27,886	61.96	–8.25
Liberal	Mark Rose	17,117	38.04	+8.25
Labor hold		Swing	–8.25	

=== Ballarat East ===
2010 Victorian state election: Ballarat East
Party	Candidate	Votes	%	±%
Liberal	Ben Taylor	15,758	43.40	+9.80
Labor	Geoff Howard	14,076	38.77	−4.18
Greens	Linda Zibell	5,363	14.77	+3.01
Family First	Gary Greville	1,109	3.05	−2.03
Total formal votes		36,306	95.69	−0.47
Informal votes		1,636	4.31	+0.47
Turnout		37,942	93.50	+1.58
Two-party-preferred result
Labor	Geoff Howard	18,702	51.51	−5.13
Liberal	Ben Taylor	17,604	48.49	+5.13
Labor hold		Swing	−5.13	

=== Ballarat West ===
2010 Victorian state election: Ballarat West
Party	Candidate	Votes	%	±%
Liberal	Craig Coltman	17,230	43.60	+5.66
Labor	Sharon Knight	16,446	41.62	−5.49
Greens	Leon Dwyer	3,876	9.81	−0.08
Family First	Dale Butterfield	1,284	3.25	−1.78
Country Alliance	Carl Wesley	681	1.72	+1.72
Total formal votes		39,517	95.78	−0.56
Informal votes		1,740	4.22	+0.56
Turnout		41,257	93.84	+1.55
Two-party-preferred result
Labor	Sharon Knight	20,175	51.05	−5.55
Liberal	Craig Coltman	19,342	48.95	+5.55
Labor hold		Swing	−5.55	

=== Bass ===
2010 Victorian state election: Bass
Party	Candidate	Votes	%	±%
Liberal	Ken Smith	25,098	56.46	+10.10
Labor	Gerry Lonergan	12,962	29.16	−5.83
Greens	Neil Rankine	4,845	10.90	+2.04
Country Alliance	Bruce Rogers	1,546	3.48	+3.48
Total formal votes		44,451	95.20	−0.25
Informal votes		2,243	4.80	+0.25
Turnout		46,694	94.75	+0.71
Two-party-preferred result
Liberal	Ken Smith	27,804	62.58	+7.06
Labor	Gerry Lonergan	16,662	37.42	−7.06
Liberal hold		Swing	+7.06	

=== Bayswater ===
2010 Victorian state election: Bayswater
Party	Candidate	Votes	%	±%
Liberal	Heidi Victoria	17,597	52.85	+11.76
Labor	Peter Lockwood	10,138	30.45	−5.65
Greens	James Tennant	2,873	8.63	+0.74
Sex Party	Sotiria Stratis	1,256	3.77	+3.77
Family First	Gary Coombes	973	2.92	−1.09
Democratic Labor	Ronald Prendergast	456	1.37	+1.37
Total formal votes		33,293	95.47	+1.22
Informal votes		1,579	4.53	−1.22
Turnout		34,872	93.99	+0.42
Two-party-preferred result
Liberal	Heidi Victoria	20,178	60.57	+7.68
Labor	Peter Lockwood	13,134	39.43	−7.68
Liberal hold		Swing	+7.68	

=== Bellarine ===
2010 Victorian state election: Bellarine
Party	Candidate	Votes	%	±%
Liberal	Kurt Reiter	17,140	43.05	+5.85
Labor	Lisa Neville	16,324	41.00	−7.49
Greens	Judy Baldacchino	3,123	7.84	−1.75
Family First	Lara Duff	944	2.37	−2.34
Democratic Labor	Klaus Clapinski	831	2.09	+2.09
Country Alliance	Nick McCallum	665	1.67	+1.67
Independent	Stephen Juhasz	510	1.28	+1.28
Socialist Alliance	Mitch Cherry	274	0.69	+0.69
Total formal votes		39,811	94.69	−1.79
Informal votes		2,231	5.31	+1.79
Turnout		42,042	94.76	+0.59
Two-party-preferred result
Labor	Lisa Neville	20,449	51.37	−6.59
Liberal	Kurt Reiter	19,362	48.63	+6.59
Labor hold		Swing	−6.59	

=== Benalla ===
2010 Victorian state election: Benalla
Party	Candidate	Votes	%	±%
National	Bill Sykes	21,072	63.28	+21.15
Labor	Ro Allen	6,124	18.39	−6.81
Greens	Kammy Cordner Hunt	2,756	8.28	+1.18
Country Alliance	Rochelle Hunt	2,546	7.65	+7.65
Independent	Nicholas Williams	804	2.41	+2.41
Total formal votes		33,302	95.97	−0.50
Informal votes		1,398	4.03	+0.50
Turnout		34,700	93.82	+0.67
Two-party-preferred result
National	Bill Sykes	24,354	73.06	+5.55
Labor	Ro Allen	8,978	26.94	−5.55
National hold		Swing	+5.55	

=== Benambra ===
2010 Victorian state election: Benambra
Party	Candidate	Votes	%	±%
Liberal	Bill Tilley	18,424	55.86	+17.24
Labor	John Williams	7,537	22.85	−10.12
Greens	Jennifer O'Connor	3,658	11.09	+4.38
Country Alliance	Haden Macaulay	2,241	6.79	+6.79
Family First	Robert Cavedon	1,125	3.41	+0.73
Total formal votes		32,985	95.80	−0.87
Informal votes		1,447	4.20	+0.87
Turnout		34,432	92.45	+0.17
Two-party-preferred result
Liberal	Bill Tilley	21,909	66.48	+8.77
Labor	John Williams	11,045	33.52	−8.77
Liberal hold		Swing	+8.77	

=== Bendigo East ===
2010 Victorian state election: Bendigo East
Party	Candidate	Votes	%	±%
Labor	Jacinta Allan	16,079	43.85	−3.03
Liberal	Michael Langdon	12,864	35.08	+0.56
Greens	Tim Bardsley	2,295	6.26	−0.94
National	Peter Schwarz	2,196	5.99	−0.42
Country Alliance	Rod Leunig	1,275	3.48	+3.48
Sex Party	Gary Hillier	824	2.25	+2.25
Family First	Belinda Guerra	447	1.22	−3.12
Democratic Labor	James Stewart	412	1.12	+1.12
Christian Democrats	Ben Veitz	275	0.75	+0.75
Total formal votes		36,667	95.25	−0.78
Informal votes		1,827	4.75	+0.78
Turnout		38,494	94.51	+0.75
Two-party-preferred result
Labor	Jacinta Allan	19,797	53.82	−1.53
Liberal	Michael Langdon	16,989	46.18	+1.53
Labor hold		Swing	−1.53	

=== Bendigo West ===
2010 Victorian state election: Bendigo West
Party	Candidate	Votes	%	±%
Labor	Maree Edwards	14,431	39.34	−9.12
National	Steven Oliver	7,965	21.71	+15.41
Liberal	Anita Donlon	7,343	20.02	−9.16
Greens	Sue-Ellen Radford	3,999	10.90	−0.07
Country Alliance	Trevor Phillips	1,328	3.62	+3.62
Family First	Frances Wintle	671	1.83	−3.25
Democratic Labor	Sandra Caddy	584	1.59	+1.59
Christian Democrats	Anne Foster	361	0.98	+0.98
Total formal votes		36,682	94.52	−1.63
Informal votes		2,127	5.48	+1.63
Turnout		38,809	93.11	+0.22
Two-party-preferred result
Labor	Maree Edwards	19,417	52.93	−7.63
National	Steven Oliver	17,265	47.07	+47.07
Labor hold		Swing	−7.63	

=== Bentleigh ===
2010 Victorian state election: Bentleigh
Party	Candidate	Votes	%	±%
Liberal	Elizabeth Miller	16,296	47.00	+7.33
Labor	Rob Hudson	13,643	39.35	−7.64
Greens	Brett Hedger	3,545	10.22	+0.03
Democratic Labor	Julian Coutts	524	1.51	+1.51
Family First	Lex Graber	364	1.05	−1.67
Independent	John Myers	300	0.87	+0.87
Total formal votes		34,672	95.55	−0.55
Informal votes		1,615	4.45	+0.55
Turnout		36,287	93.73	−0.26
Two-party-preferred result
Liberal	Elizabeth Miller	17,612	50.63	+6.95
Labor	Rob Hudson	17,171	49.37	−6.95
Liberal gain from Labor		Swing	+6.95	

=== Box Hill ===
2010 Victorian state election: Box Hill
Party	Candidate	Votes	%	±%
Liberal	Robert Clark	20,415	58.31	+8.82
Labor	Peter Chandler	8,978	25.64	−7.11
Greens	Timothy Baxter	4,952	14.14	+0.03
Family First	Gary Ong	666	1.90	−0.76
Total formal votes		35,011	96.81	+0.13
Informal votes		1,155	3.19	−0.13
Turnout		36,166	92.98	+0.11
Two-party-preferred result
Liberal	Robert Clark	22,346	63.80	+8.58
Labor	Peter Chandler	12,677	36.20	−8.58
Liberal hold		Swing	+8.58	

=== Brighton ===
2010 Victorian state election: Brighton
Party	Candidate	Votes	%	±%
Liberal	Louise Asher	21,375	62.51	+7.60
Labor	Tom Daley	6,661	19.48	−6.27
Greens	Margaret Beavis	5,465	15.98	+2.69
Family First	Laurence Giddings	353	1.03	−0.77
Independent	A.L. Thompson	343	1.00	+1.00
Total formal votes		34,197	96.57	−0.57
Informal votes		1,215	3.43	+0.57
Turnout		35,412	92.30	+0.59
Two-party-preferred result
Liberal	Louise Asher	23,091	67.56	+6.63
Labor	Tom Daley	11,089	32.44	−6.63
Liberal hold		Swing	+6.63	

=== Broadmeadows ===
2010 Victorian state election: Broadmeadows
Party	Candidate	Votes	%	±%
Labor	John Brumby	19,125	62.29	−5.35
Liberal	Samli Ozturk	7,761	25.28	+12.38
Greens	Jaime De Loma-Osorio	2,304	7.50	+0.90
Democratic Labor	Kevin Butler	778	2.53	+2.53
Independent	Peter Byrne	737	2.40	+2.40
Total formal votes		30,705	92.42	+0.68
Informal votes		2,517	7.58	−0.68
Turnout		33,222	88.77	−1.65
Two-party-preferred result
Labor	John Brumby	21,811	70.98	−10.91
Liberal	Samli Ozturk	8,919	29.02	+10.91
Labor hold		Swing	−10.91	

=== Brunswick ===
2010 Victorian state election: Brunswick
Party	Candidate	Votes	%	±%
Labor	Jane Garrett	13,129	36.02	−11.74
Greens	Cyndi Dawes	11,023	30.24	+0.53
Liberal	Kyle Dadleh	6,209	17.04	−0.38
Independent	Phil Cleary	3,914	10.74	+10.74
Sex Party	Amy Mulcahy	1,418	3.89	+3.89
Socialist Alliance	Trent Hawkins	405	1.11	−0.93
Independent	Bill Cawte	348	0.95	+0.95
Total formal votes		36,446	94.75	+0.91
Informal votes		2,018	5.25	−0.91
Turnout		38,464	90.89	+1.61
Notional two-party-preferred count
Labor	Jane Garrett	27,404	75.2	−2.7
Liberal	Kyle Dadleh	9,042	24.8	+2.7
Two-candidate-preferred result
Labor	Jane Garrett	19,545	53.52	−0.13
Greens	Cyndi Dawes	16,974	46.48	+0.13
Labor hold		Swing	−0.13	

=== Bulleen ===
2010 Victorian state election: Bulleen
Party	Candidate	Votes	%	±%
Liberal	Nicholas Kotsiras	18,849	59.52	+6.82
Labor	Ivan Reid	8,533	26.95	−6.63
Greens	Fiona Mackenzie	2,712	8.56	−0.12
Family First	Kevin Tan	1,030	3.25	−1.79
Independent	Kelvin Eldridge	542	1.71	+1.71
Total formal votes		31,666	95.16	−0.76
Informal votes		1,611	4.84	+0.76
Turnout		33,277	93.77	−0.39
Two-party-preferred result
Liberal	Nicholas Kotsiras	20,509	64.68	+6.25
Labor	Ivan Reid	11,199	35.32	−6.25
Liberal hold		Swing	+6.25	

=== Bundoora ===
2010 Victorian state election: Bundoora
Party	Candidate	Votes	%	±%
Labor	Colin Brooks	14,967	46.06	−6.99
Liberal	Goldy Brar	11,859	36.49	+6.47
Greens	Tim Roberts	3,285	10.11	−0.99
Family First	Luke Conlon	915	2.82	−2.06
Independent	Karen-Joy McColl	764	2.35	+2.35
Democratic Labor	Catherine O'Farrell	707	2.18	+2.18
Total formal votes		32,497	94.83	−0.58
Informal votes		1,770	5.17	+0.58
Turnout		34,267	93.51	−0.75
Two-party-preferred result
Labor	Colin Brooks	18,784	57.69	−7.43
Liberal	Goldy Brar	13,771	42.31	+7.43
Labor hold		Swing	−7.43	

=== Burwood ===
2010 Victorian state election: Burwood
Party	Candidate	Votes	%	±%
Liberal	Graham Watt	17,500	49.70	+8.46
Labor	Bob Stensholt	11,732	33.22	−8.77
Greens	Emily Cowan	4,146	11.78	−0.81
Sex Party	Eamon Cole-Flynn	751	2.13	+2.13
Democratic Labor	Lucia De Summa	545	1.55	+1.55
Family First	Iming Chan	536	1.52	−2.55
Total formal votes		35,210	96.66	−0.56
Informal votes		1,215	3.34	+0.56
Turnout		36,245	93.51	+0.54
Two-party-preferred result
Liberal	Graham Watt	19,710	55.86	+9.59
Labor	Bob Stensholt	15,574	44.14	−9.59
Liberal gain from Labor		Swing	+9.59	

=== Carrum ===
2010 Victorian state election: Carrum
Party	Candidate	Votes	%	±%
Liberal	Donna Bauer	17,539	46.37	+8.27
Labor	Jenny Lindell	14,430	38.15	−9.77
Greens	Henry Kelsall	3,593	9.50	+0.60
Family First	John Churchwood	939	2.48	−1.10
Democratic Labor	Ewa Losinski	873	2.31	+2.31
Independent	Steven Garland	447	1.18	+1.18
Total formal votes		37,821	95.36	+0.08
Informal votes		1,840	4.64	−0.08
Turnout		39,661	93.51	+0.14
Two-party-preferred result
Liberal	Donna Bauer	19,765	52.21	+8.90
Labor	Jenny Lindell	18,093	47.79	−8.90
Liberal gain from Labor		Swing	+8.90	

=== Caulfield ===
2010 Victorian state election: Caulfield
Party	Candidate	Votes	%	±%
Liberal	David Southwick	19,018	57.75	+3.77
Labor	Heather Abramson	7,729	23.47	−5.46
Greens	Phillip Walker	5,307	16.11	+0.85
Family First	Eric Labonne	490	1.49	−0.03
Independent	Daniel Sapphire	227	0.69	+0.69
Independent	Peter Brohier	163	0.49	+0.49
Total formal votes		32,934	96.42	+0.08
Informal votes		1,223	3.58	−0.08
Turnout		34,157	90.62	−0.29
Two-party-preferred result
Liberal	David Southwick	20,267	61.53	+3.90
Labor	Heather Abramson	12,672	38.47	−3.90
Liberal hold		Swing	+3.90	

=== Clayton ===
2010 Victorian state election: Clayton
Party	Candidate	Votes	%	±%
Labor	Hong Lim	15,843	54.34	−7.85
Liberal	Justin Scott	8,833	30.29	+6.54
Greens	Matthew Billman	2,782	9.54	+0.13
Democratic Labor	Peter Bolling	976	3.35	+3.35
Family First	Darren Reid	723	2.48	−0.90
Total formal votes		29,157	94.16	−0.08
Informal votes		1,808	5.84	+0.08
Turnout		30,965	91.50	−2.99
Two-party-preferred result
Labor	Hong Lim	19,071	65.31	−4.96
Liberal	Justin Scott	10,129	34.69	+4.96
Labor hold		Swing	−4.96	

=== Cranbourne ===
2010 Victorian state election: Cranbourne
Party	Candidate	Votes	%	±%
Labor	Jude Perera	17,803	42.49	−12.61
Liberal	Geoff Ablett	16,565	39.53	+6.50
Greens	Hilary Bray	3,475	8.29	+2.58
Family First	Steve Funke	1,410	3.36	−2.80
Democratic Labor	Luke O'Connor	1,358	3.24	+3.24
Independent	Amanda Stapledon	921	2.20	+2.20
Independent	Bob Halsall	372	0.89	+0.89
Total formal votes		41,904	93.83	−0.52
Informal votes		2,754	6.17	+0.52
Turnout		44,658	92.89	−0.67
Two-party-preferred result
Labor	Jude Perera	21,774	51.84	−9.45
Liberal	Geoff Ablett	20,229	48.16	+9.45
Labor hold		Swing	−9.45	

=== Dandenong ===
2010 Victorian state election: Dandenong
Party	Candidate	Votes	%	±%
Labor	John Pandazopoulos	14,934	50.53	−8.00
Liberal	Dale Key	8,658	29.29	+4.38
Greens	Matthew Kirwan	2,591	8.77	+0.50
Democratic Labor	Christopher Blackburn	2,037	6.89	+6.89
Family First	Damien Latcham	1,337	4.52	−3.77
Total formal votes		29,557	92.57	−0.50
Informal votes		2,373	7.43	+0.50
Turnout		31,930	89.86	−1.29
Two-party-preferred result
Labor	John Pandazopoulos	18,887	63.87	−4.80
Liberal	Dale Key	10,686	36.13	+4.80
Labor hold		Swing	−4.80	

=== Derrimut ===
2010 Victorian state election: Derrimut
Party	Candidate	Votes	%	±%
Labor	Telmo Languiller	17,076	49.83	−13.61
Liberal	Wayne Tseng	7,971	23.26	+4.34
Greens	Geraldine Brooks	5,783	16.88	+8.89
Family First	Colin Moyle	2,001	5.84	−1.60
Democratic Labor	Michael Deverala	1,436	4.19	+4.19
Total formal votes		34,267	92.18	+0.69
Informal votes		2,906	7.89	−0.69
Turnout		37,173	91.01	−0.64
Two-party-preferred result
Labor	Telmo Languiller	22,123	64.35	−9.95
Liberal	Wayne Tseng	12,254	35.65	+9.95
Labor hold		Swing	−9.95	

=== Doncaster ===
2010 Victorian state election: Doncaster
Party	Candidate	Votes	%	±%
Liberal	Mary Wooldridge	20,417	62.73	+12.18
Labor	Charles Pick	8,500	26.12	−6.55
Greens	Nick Carson	2,616	8.04	+0.64
Family First	Ken Smithies	1,015	3.12	−1.16
Total formal votes		32,548	95.28	−0.73
Informal votes		1,614	4.72	+0.73
Turnout		34,162	93.54	+0.00
Two-party-preferred result
Liberal	Mary Wooldridge	22,020	67.61	+9.49
Labor	Charles Pick	10,549	32.39	−9.49
Liberal hold		Swing	+9.49	

=== Eltham ===
2010 Victorian state election: Eltham
Party	Candidate	Votes	%	±%
Liberal	Andrew Hart	16,047	44.87	+5.68
Labor	Steve Herbert	13,792	38.57	−5.85
Greens	James Searle	4,747	13.27	−0.13
Family First	Shane Porter	619	1.73	−1.27
Democratic Labor	Trudi Aiashi	557	1.56	+1.56
Total formal votes		35,762	95.99	−0.72
Informal votes		1,494	4.01	+0.72
Turnout		37,256	94.58	−0.03
Two-party-preferred result
Labor	Steve Herbert	18,184	50.80	−5.68
Liberal	Andrew Hart	17,612	49.20	+5.68
Labor hold		Swing	−5.68	

=== Essendon ===
2010 Victorian state election: Essendon
Party	Candidate	Votes	%	±%
Liberal	Rebecca Gauci	12,983	36.83	+3.53
Labor	Justin Madden	12,867	36.50	−13.37
Greens	Rose Iser	5,816	16.50	+4.34
Independent	Paul Giuliano	2,540	7.21	+7.21
Democratic Labor	Sarah Notaro	1,047	2.97	+2.97
Total formal votes		35,253	95.97	+0.72
Informal votes		1,480	4.03	−0.72
Turnout		36,733	92.17	+0.44
Two-party-preferred result
Labor	Justin Madden	18,224	51.66	−10.04
Liberal	Rebecca Gauci	17,051	48.34	+10.04
Labor hold		Swing	−10.04	

=== Evelyn ===
2010 Victorian state election: Evelyn
Party	Candidate	Votes	%	±%
Liberal	Christine Fyffe	20,612	56.77	+10.92
Labor	Peter Harris	10,677	29.41	−8.92
Greens	Tania Giles	2,799	7.71	+0.70
Family First	David Szabo	1,245	3.43	−3.96
Country Alliance	Craig Jenkin	972	2.68	+2.68
Total formal votes		36,305	95.45	−0.18
Informal votes		1,729	4.55	+0.18
Turnout		38,034	94.64	+0.33
Two-party-preferred result
Liberal	Christine Fyffe	23,095	63.48	+10.68
Labor	Peter Harris	13,286	36.52	−10.68
Liberal hold		Swing	+10.68	

=== Ferntree Gully ===
2010 Victorian state election: Ferntree Gully
Party	Candidate	Votes	%	±%
Liberal	Nick Wakeling	22,020	55.54	+11.38
Labor	Josh Cullinan	11,768	29.68	−12.39
Greens	Steve Bullock	2,850	7.19	+0.08
Sex Party	Martin Leahy	1,492	3.76	+3.76
Family First	Allister Rouse	957	2.41	−2.15
Democratic Labor	Tanya Murphy	560	1.41	+1.41
Total formal votes		39,467	94.77	+0.10
Informal votes		2,189	5.23	−0.10
Turnout		41,836	94.62	+0.16
Two-party-preferred result
Liberal	Nick Wakeling	24,591	62.00	+11.96
Labor	Josh Cullinan	15,070	38.00	−11.96
Liberal hold		Swing	+11.96	

=== Footscray ===
2010 Victorian state election: Footscray
Party	Candidate	Votes	%	±%
Labor	Marsha Thomson	14,611	42.61	−9.88
Liberal	Ken Betts	8,703	25.38	+8.67
Greens	Janet Rice	7,126	20.78	+8.67
Independent	Catherine Cumming	3,240	9.45	−5.45
Socialist Alliance	Margarita Windisch	614	1.79	+0.33
Total formal votes		34,294	94.52	+1.37
Informal votes		1,989	5.48	−1.37
Turnout		36,283	90.06	−0.27
Two-party-preferred result
Labor	Marsha Thomson	22,637	66.26	−8.41
Liberal	Ken Betts	11,529	33.74	+8.41
Labor hold		Swing	−8.41	

=== Forest Hill ===
2010 Victorian state election: Forest Hill
Party	Candidate	Votes	%	±%
Liberal	Neil Angus	16,043	48.62	+4.28
Labor	Kirstie Marshall	12,796	38.78	−3.29
Greens	Andrew Henley	2,501	7.58	−1.06
Family First	Ivan Stratov	632	1.92	−3.03
Sex Party	Daniel Irwin	614	1.86	+1.86
Democratic Labor	James Fung	411	1.25	+1.25
Total formal votes		32,997	96.29	−0.09
Informal votes		1,271	3.71	+0.09
Turnout		34,268	94.11	−0.06
Two-party-preferred result
Liberal	Neil Angus	17,550	53.17	+3.94
Labor	Kirstie Marshall	15,458	46.83	−3.94
Liberal gain from Labor		Swing	+3.94	

=== Frankston ===
2010 Victorian state election: Frankston
Party	Candidate	Votes	%	±%
Liberal	Geoff Shaw	14,899	46.79	+6.03
Labor	Alistair Harkness	11,603	36.44	−7.03
Greens	Simon Tiller	2,673	8.39	−1.59
Sex Party	Shem Bennett	797	2.50	+2.50
Democratic Labor	Denise De Graaff	753	2.36	+2.36
Independent	Quinn McCormack	652	2.05	+2.05
Family First	Michael Pleiter	467	1.47	−2.49
Total formal votes		31,844	95.24	−0.53
Informal votes		1,591	4.76	+0.53
Turnout		33,435	92.04	−0.77
Two-party-preferred result
Liberal	Geoff Shaw	16,523	51.71	+4.42
Labor	Alistair Harkness	15,433	48.29	−4.42
Liberal gain from Labor		Swing	+4.42	

=== Geelong ===
2010 Victorian state election: Geelong
Party	Candidate	Votes	%	±%
Liberal	Alastair Thomson	15,472	43.01	+7.66
Labor	Ian Trezise	14,809	41.17	−7.82
Greens	Bruce Lindsay	4,131	11.48	+2.38
Family First	Len Lengyel	688	1.91	−2.92
Independent	Samantha Schultz	444	1.23	+1.23
Country Alliance	Matthew Schmidt	430	1.20	+1.20
Total formal votes		35,974	95.93	−0.37
Informal votes		1,528	4.07	+0.37
Turnout		37,502	93.61	+1.56
Two-party-preferred result
Labor	Ian Trezise	18,702	51.98	−6.35
Liberal	Alastair Thomson	17,275	48.02	+6.35
Labor hold		Swing	−6.35	

=== Gembrook ===
2010 Victorian state election: Gembrook
Party	Candidate	Votes	%	±%
Liberal	Brad Battin	18,427	47.93	+7.77
Labor	Tammy Lobato	12,638	32.87	−6.35
Greens	Brent Hall	3,689	9.60	−1.42
Family First	Rebecca Filliponi	1,032	2.68	−1.08
National	Peter McConachy	904	2.35	−1.60
Country Alliance	Alex Krstic	871	2.27	+2.27
Democratic Labor	Larry Norman	372	0.97	+0.97
Independent	Hayden Ostrom Brown	227	0.59	+0.59
Independent	Frank Dean	145	0.38	−0.40
Independent	Robert Belcher	142	0.37	+0.37
Total formal votes		38,447	94.20	−1.54
Informal votes		2,366	5.80	+1.54
Turnout		40,813	94.02	+0.03
Two-party-preferred result
Liberal	Brad Battin	21,926	56.75	+7.35
Labor	Tammy Lobato	16,707	43.25	−7.35
Liberal gain from Labor		Swing	+7.35	

=== Gippsland East ===
2010 Victorian state election: Gippsland East
Party	Candidate	Votes	%	±%
National	Tim Bull	16,987	45.12	+26.32
Independent	Craig Ingram	9,528	25.31	−13.11
Liberal	Sonia Buckley	5,368	14.26	−7.53
Labor	Gregg Cook	2,821	7.49	−4.16
Greens	Jill Redwood	1,976	5.25	+0.33
Country Alliance	Deborah Meester	972	2.58	+2.58
Total formal votes		37,652	96.81	+0.94
Informal votes		1,242	3.19	−0.94
Turnout		38,894	93.91	+1.09
Notional two-party-preferred count
National	Tim Bull	27,529	73.1	+9.6
Labor	Gregg Cook	10,123	26.9	−9.6
Two-candidate-preferred result
National	Tim Bull	23,403	62.06	+20.53
Independent	Craig Ingram	14,305	37.94	−20.53
National gain from Independent		Swing	+20.53	

=== Gippsland South ===
2010 Victorian state election: Gippsland South
Party	Candidate	Votes	%	±%
National	Peter Ryan	22,479	63.82	+22.36
Labor	Steve Boyce	6,647	18.87	−3.37
Greens	Kate Jackson	3,495	9.92	+3.26
Country Alliance	John Hirt	2,602	7.39	+7.39
Total formal votes		35,223	95.62	+0.24
Informal votes		1,615	4.38	−0.24
Turnout		36,838	93.94	+0.30
Two-party-preferred result
National	Peter Ryan	25,573	72.59	+6.86
Labor	Steve Boyce	9,655	27.41	−6.86
National hold		Swing	+6.86	

=== Hastings ===
2010 Victorian state election: Hastings
Party	Candidate	Votes	%	±%
Liberal	Neale Burgess	21,656	54.10	+9.58
Labor	Steve Hosking	12,262	30.63	−9.78
Greens	Catherine Manning	3,073	7.68	+0.66
Sex Party	Joe Mavrikos	994	2.48	+2.48
Family First	Melanie Marcin	775	1.94	−2.89
Country Alliance	Dan Martin	670	1.67	+1.67
Democratic Labor	Rob Jones	381	0.95	+0.95
Independent	Aldona Martin	218	0.54	+0.54
Total formal votes		40,029	94.44	−1.64
Informal votes		2,356	5.56	+1.64
Turnout		42,385	93.78	−0.59
Two-party-preferred result
Liberal	Neale Burgess	24,379	60.78	+9.79
Labor	Steve Hosking	15,278	39.22	−9.79
Liberal hold		Swing	+9.79	

=== Hawthorn ===
2010 Victorian state election: Hawthorn
Party	Candidate	Votes	%	±%
Liberal	Ted Baillieu	21,036	60.89	+4.83
Labor	John McNally	7,218	20.89	−4.81
Greens	Jenny Henty	5,883	17.03	+0.78
Family First	Peter Grounds	409	1.18	−0.80
Total formal votes		34,546	97.06	−0.36
Informal votes		1,047	2.94	+0.36
Turnout		35,593	91.85	+1.02
Two-party-preferred result
Liberal	Ted Baillieu	23,060	66.74	+4.48
Labor	John McNally	11,493	33.26	−4.48
Liberal hold		Swing	+4.48	

=== Ivanhoe ===
2010 Victorian state election: Ivanhoe
Party	Candidate	Votes	%	±%
Liberal	Carl Ziebell	14,413	41.98	+10.17
Labor	Anthony Carbines	12,140	35.36	−6.43
Greens	Paul Kennedy	6,240	18.18	+3.69
Democratic Labor	Stephen Smith	1,185	3.45	+3.45
Independent	Gerrit Schorel-Hlavka	351	1.02	+1.02
Total formal votes		34,329	95.51	+0.05
Informal votes		1,613	4.49	−0.05
Turnout		35,942	92.68	−0.21
Two-party-preferred result
Labor	Anthony Carbines	17,755	51.68	−7.19
Liberal	Carl Ziebell	16,599	48.32	+7.19
Labor hold		Swing	−7.19	

=== Keilor ===
2010 Victorian state election: Keilor
Party	Candidate	Votes	%	±%
Labor	Natalie Hutchins	22,943	49.84	−8.61
Liberal	Damon Ryder	14,367	31.21	+6.32
Greens	Lisa Asbury	3,625	7.88	−0.58
Family First	Scott Amberley	2,627	5.71	−2.49
Independent	Harpreet Walia	2,468	5.36	+5.36
Total formal votes		46,030	92.93	−0.78
Informal votes		3,502	7.07	+0.78
Turnout		49,532	93.72	−0.12
Two-party-preferred result
Labor	Natalie Hutchins	27,788	60.33	−9.08
Liberal	Damon Ryder	18,269	39.67	+9.08
Labor hold		Swing	−9.08	

=== Kew ===
2010 Victorian state election: Kew
Party	Candidate	Votes	%	±%
Liberal	Andrew McIntosh	19,878	60.09	+6.35
Labor	Kate Jackson	7,750	23.43	−3.96
Greens	Emma Henley	4,879	14.75	−1.34
Family First	Timothy Hunter	576	1.74	−0.21
Total formal votes		33,083	96.65	−0.64
Informal votes		1,145	3.35	+0.64
Turnout		34,228	92.75	+1.12
Two-party-preferred result
Liberal	Andrew McIntosh	21,560	65.19	+5.63
Labor	Kate Jackson	11,512	34.81	−5.63
Liberal hold		Swing	+5.63	

=== Kilsyth ===
2010 Victorian state election: Kilsyth
Party	Candidate	Votes	%	±%
Liberal	David Hodgett	19,348	52.85	+9.23
Labor	Vicki Setches	11,172	30.52	−8.37
Greens	Justin-Paul Sammons	2,913	7.96	−0.66
Family First	Daniel Harrison	1,165	3.18	−3.56
Sex Party	Sam Haughton-Greene	1,145	3.13	+3.13
Independent	Shane McKenzie	546	1.49	+1.49
Democratic Labor	Reinhard Dekter	319	0.87	+0.87
Total formal votes		36,608	95.45	−0.63
Informal votes		1,744	4.55	+0.63
Turnout		38,352	94.40	+0.48
Two-party-preferred result
Liberal	David Hodgett	19,348	60.40	+10.13
Labor	Vicki Setches	14,503	39.60	−10.13
Liberal hold		Swing	+10.13	

=== Kororoit ===
2010 Victorian state election: Kororoit
Party	Candidate	Votes	%	±%
Labor	Marlene Kairouz	19,891	55.82	+7.82
Liberal	Goran Kesic	8,912	25.01	+3.98
Greens	Anastasia Smietanka	3,513	9.86	+5.23
Independent	Kathy Majdlik	1,888	5.30	+5.30
Family First	Glenn Rozec	1,432	4.02	+4.02
Total formal votes		35,636	92.05	−1.64
Informal votes		3,076	7.95	+1.64
Turnout		38,712	91.09	+7.78
Two-party-preferred result
Labor	Marlene Kairouz	24,453	68.58	−6.98
Liberal	Goran Kesic	11,203	31.42	+6.98
Labor hold		Swing	−6.98	

=== Lara ===
2010 Victorian state election: Lara
Party	Candidate	Votes	%	±%
Labor	John Eren	20,778	53.61	−5.59
Liberal	Robert Eyton	11,366	29.33	+3.39
Greens	Rob Leach	3,401	8.77	+2.12
Family First	Glenn Colla	2,324	6.00	−2.21
Country Alliance	Keith McDermott	889	2.29	+2.29
Total formal votes		38,758	94.23	+0.25
Informal votes		2,373	5.77	−0.25
Turnout		41,131	93.29	+0.68
Two-party-preferred result
Labor	John Eren	25,299	65.40	−2.53
Liberal	Robert Eyton	13,387	34.60	+2.53
Labor hold		Swing	−2.53	

=== Lowan ===
2010 Victorian state election: Lowan
Party	Candidate	Votes	%	±%
National	Hugh Delahunty	23,702	67.42	+19.75
Labor	Mandy Kirsopp	7,783	22.14	−0.23
Greens	Ben Wilkie	1,966	5.59	+1.34
Family First	Randall Reimer	1,704	4.85	+1.50
Total formal votes		35,155	96.27	−0.15
Informal votes		1,363	3.73	+0.15
Turnout		36,518	94.91	+0.17
Two-party-preferred result
National	Hugh Delahunty	25,337	72.08	0.00
Labor	Mandy Kirsopp	9,812	27.92	0.00
National hold		Swing	0.00	

=== Lyndhurst ===
2010 Victorian state election: Lyndhurst
Party	Candidate	Votes	%	±%
Labor	Tim Holding	19,820	55.47	−9.82
Liberal	Tony Holland	9,946	27.83	+5.14
Greens	Nina Springle	2,191	6.13	+1.72
Family First	Heather Wheatley	1,744	4.88	−1.54
Independent	Hung Vo	1,277	3.57	+3.57
Democratic Labor	Yien Wang	444	1.24	+1.24
Independent	Gordon Ford	311	0.87	−0.31
Total formal votes		35,733	92.94	−0.43
Informal votes		2,715	7.06	+0.43
Turnout		38,448	92.47	−0.21
Two-party-preferred result
Labor	Tim Holding	22,912	63.91	−7.57
Liberal	Tony Holland	12,941	36.09	+7.57
Labor hold		Swing	−7.57	

=== Macedon ===
2010 Victorian state election: Macedon
Party	Candidate	Votes	%	±%
Liberal	Tristan Weston	18,141	42.32	+11.01
Labor	Joanne Duncan	17,282	40.31	−5.06
Greens	Nicky Haslinghouse	3,613	8.43	+0.37
Family First	Judith Hungerford	1,049	2.45	−0.15
Independent	Mahinda Samararatna	886	2.07	+2.07
Democratic Labor	Sharon Lane	700	1.63	+1.63
Country Alliance	Gavin Greaves	683	1.59	+1.59
Independent	Lorraine Beyer	516	1.20	+1.20
Total formal votes		42,870	94.81	−1.40
Informal votes		2,349	5.19	+1.40
Turnout		45,219	94.51	−0.27
Two-party-preferred result
Labor	Joanne Duncan	22,061	51.27	−6.90
Liberal	Tristan Weston	20,970	48.73	+6.90
Labor hold		Swing	−6.90	

=== Malvern ===
2010 Victorian state election: Malvern
Party	Candidate	Votes	%	±%
Liberal	Michael O'Brien	22,160	65.29	+8.41
Labor	Nick Voulanas	6,584	19.40	−7.75
Greens	Sam Hibbins	4,807	14.16	+1.60
Family First	Miranda de la Masse-Homsy	390	1.15	−0.39
Total formal votes		33,941	96.84	−0.19
Informal votes		1,109	3.16	+0.19
Turnout		35,050	92.73	+6.01
Two-party-preferred result
Liberal	Michael O'Brien	23,881	70.44	+9.12
Labor	Nick Voulanas	10,023	29.56	−9.12
Liberal hold		Swing	+9.12	

=== Melbourne ===
2010 Victorian state election: Melbourne
Party	Candidate	Votes	%	±%
Labor	Bronwyn Pike	13,116	35.67	−8.89
Greens	Brian Walters	11,735	31.92	+4.51
Liberal	Luke Martin	10,281	27.96	+5.88
Sex Party	Rory Killen	1,061	2.89	+2.89
Independent	Peter Lazzari	231	0.63	+0.63
Independent	John Perkins	201	0.55	+0.55
Independent	Maxine Fensom	142	0.39	+0.39
Total formal votes		36,767	96.31	−0.01
Informal votes		1,409	3.69	+0.01
Turnout		38,176	86.93	+2.09
Notional two-party-preferred count
Labor	Bronwyn Pike	23,683	64.41	−7.0
Liberal	Luke Martin	13,084	35.59	+7.0
Two-candidate-preferred result
Labor	Bronwyn Pike	20,510	55.76	+3.88
Greens	Brian Walters	16,273	44.24	−3.88
Labor hold		Swing	+3.88	

=== Melton ===
2010 Victorian state election: Melton
Party	Candidate	Votes	%	±%
Labor	Don Nardella	18,520	49.44	−5.00
Liberal	Braidy Kean	11,615	31.01	+3.17
Greens	Katrina Bradfield	3,247	8.67	+2.24
Family First	Samir Sabeh	1,431	3.82	−2.80
Independent	Matt DeLeon	1,260	3.36	+3.36
Country Alliance	Sav Mangion	893	2.38	+2.38
Socialist Alliance	Ron Guy	494	1.32	+1.32
Total formal votes		37,460	92.75	−1.35
Informal votes		2,926	7.25	+1.35
Turnout		40,386	92.55	−0.49
Two-party-preferred result
Labor	Don Nardella	23,525	62.78	−0.76
Liberal	Braidy Kean	13,947	37.22	+0.76
Labor hold		Swing	−0.76	

=== Mildura ===
2010 Victorian state election: Mildura
Party	Candidate	Votes	%	±%
National	Peter Crisp	15,170	46.66	+6.43
Independent	Glenn Milne	5,209	16.02	+16.02
Labor	Ali Cupper	4,943	15.20	+8.54
Independent	Doug Tonge	4,696	14.44	+14.44
Family First	Christopher Gray	999	3.07	−0.51
Greens	Gavin Rees	563	1.73	−0.40
Democratic Labor	Ross Douglass	475	1.46	+1.46
Independent	Anthony Connell	457	1.41	+1.41
Total formal votes		32,512	94.17	−0.95
Informal votes		2,011	5.83	+0.95
Turnout		34,523	91.72	−0.44
Notional two-party-preferred count
National	Peter Crisp	20,417	62.8	−7.9
Labor	Ali Cupper	12,095	37.2	+7.9
Two-candidate-preferred result
National	Peter Crisp	19,310	59.19	+3.39
Independent	Glenn Milne	13,312	40.81	+40.81
National hold		Swing	+3.39	

=== Mill Park ===
2010 Victorian state election: Mill Park
Party	Candidate	Votes	%	±%
Labor	Lily D'Ambrosio	21,861	60.89	−1.16
Liberal	Peter Chugha	9,537	26.56	+4.30
Greens	Gurm Sekhon	2,605	7.26	+1.22
Family First	Phillip Cogger	1,901	5.29	−2.20
Total formal votes		35,904	93.66	−0.74
Informal votes		2,430	6.34	+0.74
Turnout		38,334	93.42	−1.31
Two-party-preferred result
Labor	Lily D'Ambrosio	24,966	69.45	−1.34
Liberal	Peter Chugha	10,982	30.55	+1.34
Labor hold		Swing	−1.34	

=== Mitcham ===
2010 Victorian state election: Mitcham
Party	Candidate	Votes	%	±%
Liberal	Dee Ryall	15,717	46.55	+7.09
Labor	Tony Robinson	11,669	34.56	−5.56
Greens	Sheridan Lewis	4,024	11.92	+0.33
Sex Party	Paul Elliott	963	2.85	+2.85
Family First	Daniel Ha	758	2.25	−2.28
Democratic Labor	Barry O'Shea	632	1.87	+1.87
Total formal votes		33,763	96.55	+0.06
Informal votes		1,208	3.45	−0.06
Turnout		34,971	94.38	−0.10
Two-party-preferred result
Liberal	Dee Ryall	17,852	52.90	+4.77
Labor	Tony Robinson	15,895	47.10	−4.77
Liberal gain from Labor		Swing	+4.77	

=== Monbulk ===
2010 Victorian state election: Monbulk
Party	Candidate	Votes	%	±%
Liberal	Matt Mills	14,506	42.55	+5.16
Labor	James Merlino	12,318	36.14	−4.47
Greens	Jo Tenner	5,244	15.38	−0.78
Democratic Labor	Elizabeth Coyne	618	1.81	+1.81
Family First	Rajeeva Gunasekera	610	1.79	−2.37
Country Alliance	Simon Picknell	528	1.55	+1.55
Independent	Lawrence Mobsby	264	0.77	+0.77
Total formal votes		34,088	95.56	−0.29
Informal votes		1,582	4.44	+0.29
Turnout		35,670	94.15	+0.18
Two-party-preferred result
Labor	James Merlino	17,762	52.08	−4.45
Liberal	Matt Mills	16,345	47.92	+4.45
Labor hold		Swing	−4.45	

=== Mordialloc ===
2010 Victorian state election: Mordialloc
Party	Candidate	Votes	%	±%
Liberal	Lorraine Wreford	17,223	46.86	+6.11
Labor	Janice Munt	13,778	37.49	−7.85
Greens	Camellia Feteiha	3,443	9.37	−0.66
Sex Party	Tom Killen	764	2.08	+2.08
Family First	Stephen Nowland	552	1.50	−2.38
Democratic Labor	James Leach	514	1.40	+1.40
Independent	Michael Carty	225	0.61	+0.61
Independent	Brandon Hoult	152	0.41	+0.41
Independent	Frank Denvir	102	0.28	+0.28
Total formal votes		36,753	93.95	−2.03
Informal votes		2,368	6.05	+2.03
Turnout		39,121	93.84	+0.01
Two-party-preferred result
Liberal	Lorraine Wreford	19,197	51.96	+5.58
Labor	Janice Munt	17,746	48.04	−5.58
Liberal gain from Labor		Swing	+5.58	

=== Mornington ===
2010 Victorian state election: Mornington
Party	Candidate	Votes	%	±%
Liberal	David Morris	22,238	61.44	+5.67
Labor	James Dooley	9,119	25.19	−2.99
Greens	Martin Rush	3,823	10.56	+0.43
Independent	Matt Taylor	606	1.67	+1.67
Country Alliance	Stephen Schafer	411	1.14	+1.14
Total formal votes		36,197	96.11	−0.40
Informal votes		1,464	3.89	+0.40
Turnout		37,661	93.70	+0.33
Two-party-preferred result
Liberal	David Morris	23,915	66.03	+4.18
Labor	James Dooley	12,305	33.97	−4.18
Liberal hold		Swing	+4.18	

=== Morwell ===
2010 Victorian state election: Morwell
Party	Candidate	Votes	%	±%
National	Russell Northe	19,200	56.11	+28.52
Labor	Graeme Middlemiss	9,752	28.50	−12.07
Greens	Dan Jordan	1,645	4.81	−0.26
Country Alliance	Peter Kelly	1,226	3.58	+3.58
Independent	Lou Sigmund	968	2.83	+2.83
Independent	Glyn Baker	851	2.49	+2.49
Independent	Peter Gardner	574	1.68	+1.68
Total formal votes		34,216	94.90	−0.87
Informal votes		1,838	5.10	+0.87
Turnout		36,054	93.29	−0.41
Two-party-preferred result
National	Russell Northe	22,726	66.26	+14.14
Labor	Graeme Middlemiss	11,572	33.74	−14.14
National hold		Swing	+14.14	

=== Mount Waverley ===
2010 Victorian state election: Mount Waverley
Party	Candidate	Votes	%	±%
Liberal	Michael Gidley	17,126	51.34	+6.96
Labor	Maxine Morand	11,420	34.23	−7.58
Greens	Josh Fergeus	2,548	7.64	−0.38
Family First	John Canavan	815	2.44	−1.02
Sex Party	Lisa Chevallier	578	1.73	+1.73
Democratic Labor	Des Kelly	535	1.60	+1.60
Independent	Ali Khan	336	1.01	+1.01
Total formal votes		33,358	96.28	+0.19
Informal votes		1,289	3.72	−0.19
Turnout		34,647	93.85	−0.38
Two-party-preferred result
Liberal	Michael Gidley	19,177	57.45	+7.81
Labor	Maxine Morand	14,204	42.55	−7.81
Liberal gain from Labor		Swing	+7.81	

=== Mulgrave ===
2010 Victorian state election: Mulgrave
Party	Candidate	Votes	%	±%
Labor	Daniel Andrews	15,392	50.68	−8.13
Liberal	Courtney Mann	11,166	36.77	+8.18
Greens	John Janetzki	2,173	7.16	+0.74
Family First	Jim Johnson	1,041	3.43	−2.75
Democratic Labor	Geraldine Kokoszka	596	1.96	+1.96
Total formal votes		30,368	93.62	−0.43
Informal votes		2,069	6.38	+0.43
Turnout		32,437	92.69	−0.36
Two-party-preferred result
Labor	Daniel Andrews	17,779	58.48	−7.29
Liberal	Courtney Mann	12,623	41.52	+7.29
Labor hold		Swing	−7.29	

=== Murray Valley ===
2010 Victorian state election: Murray Valley
Party	Candidate	Votes	%	±%
National	Tim McCurdy	18,357	53.83	+2.92
Labor	Lachlan Enshaw	7,065	20.72	−1.20
Independent	Roberto Paino	3,339	9.79	+9.79
Country Alliance	Peter Watson	2,668	7.82	+7.82
Greens	Doug Ralph	1,598	4.69	−0.75
Family First	Ray Hungerford	1,073	3.15	−1.00
Total formal votes		34,100	94.87	−1.43
Informal votes		1,845	5.13	+1.43
Turnout		35,945	93.75	+0.59
Two-party-preferred result
National	Tim McCurdy	23,604	69.04	−2.72
Labor	Lachlan Enshaw	10,587	30.96	+2.72
National hold		Swing	−2.72	

=== Narracan ===
2010 Victorian state election: Narracan
Party	Candidate	Votes	%	±%
Liberal	Gary Blackwood	21,636	56.67	+14.64
Labor	Tony Flynn	11,161	29.23	−10.62
Greens	Belinda Rogers	2,967	7.77	+0.61
Country Alliance	Brian Dungey	1,638	4.29	+4.29
Independent	Jenny Webb	777	2.04	+2.04
Total formal votes		38,179	96.14	+0.01
Informal votes		1,531	3.86	−0.01
Turnout		93.80	93.80	+0.01
Two-party-preferred result
Liberal	Gary Blackwood	23,814	62.39	+9.74
Labor	Tony Flynn	14,353	37.61	−9.74
Liberal hold		Swing	+9.74	

=== Narre Warren North ===
2010 Victorian state election: Narre Warren North
Party	Candidate	Votes	%	±%
Labor	Luke Donnellan	15,043	42.52	−9.79
Liberal	Michelle Frazer	14,743	41.67	+8.03
Greens	Michael Schilling	2,443	6.91	−0.04
Family First	Lissa McKenzie	1,222	3.45	−2.53
Democratic Labor	Carmen Sant	1,041	3.09	+3.09
Independent	Paul Richardson	604	1.71	+1.71
Independent	Taimour Hassan	228	0.64	+0.64
Total formal votes		35,377	93.83	−1.65
Informal votes		2,325	6.17	+1.65
Turnout		37,702	93.78	+0.13
Two-party-preferred result
Labor	Luke Donnellan	18,828	53.01	−6.22
Liberal	Michelle Frazer	16,692	46.99	+6.22
Labor hold		Swing	−6.22	

=== Narre Warren South ===
2010 Victorian state election: Narre Warren South
Party	Candidate	Votes	%	±%
Labor	Judith Graley	22,007	47.95	−4.87
Liberal	Gary Rowe	17,402	37.92	+4.10
Greens	Claus Endres	3,244	7.07	+0.64
Family First	Mark Konkel	1,645	3.58	−3.36
Democratic Labor	Nathan Dodd	685	1.49	+1.49
Independent	Ian George	493	1.07	+1.07
Independent	Angela Dunleavy	416	0.91	+0.91
Total formal votes		45,892	93.67	−2.08
Informal votes		3,101	6.33	+2.08
Turnout		48,993	93.61	−0.60
Two-party-preferred result
Labor	Judith Graley	26,109	56.74	−4.20
Liberal	Gary Rowe	19,910	43.26	+4.20
Labor hold		Swing	−4.20	

=== Nepean ===
2010 Victorian state election: Nepean
Party	Candidate	Votes	%	±%
Liberal	Martin Dixon	20,700	59.74	+5.15
Labor	John Lannan	9,333	26.94	−4.95
Greens	Anton Vigenser	4,176	12.05	+1.22
Country Alliance	Keith Lyon	439	1.27	+1.27
Total formal votes		34,648	95.87	+0.32
Informal votes		1,494	4.13	−0.32
Turnout		36,142	92.55	−0.32
Two-party-preferred result
Liberal	Martin Dixon	22,288	64.31	+4.93
Labor	John Lannan	12,370	35.69	−4.93
Liberal hold		Swing	+4.93	

=== Niddrie ===
2010 Victorian state election: Niddrie
Party	Candidate	Votes	%	±%
Labor	Rob Hulls	14,435	45.68	−8.08
Liberal	Joh Bauch	11,000	34.81	+3.34
Greens	Leharna Black	2,451	7.76	−1.37
Independent	Jim Little	1,516	4.80	+4.80
Family First	Mark Markovic	1,263	4.00	−1.65
Independent	Steve Medcraft	499	1.58	+1.58
Independent	Brian Roberts	162	0.51	+0.51
Independent	John Nott	140	0.44	+0.44
Independent	Robert Livesay	131	0.41	+0.41
Total formal votes		31,597	91.69	−2.06
Informal votes		2,865	8.31	+2.06
Turnout		34,462	93.63	+0.12
Two-party-preferred result
Labor	Rob Hulls	18,105	56.95	−4.27
Liberal	Joh Bauch	13,687	43.05	+4.27
Labor hold		Swing	−4.27	

=== Northcote ===
2010 Victorian state election: Northcote
Party	Candidate	Votes	%	±%
Labor	Fiona Richardson	15,917	44.94	−7.63
Greens	Anne Martinelli	10,927	30.85	+3.44
Liberal	Steve Moran	6,863	19.37	+4.08
Sex Party	Robert Bishop	1,098	3.10	+3.10
Independent	Darren Lewin-Hill	404	1.14	−0.39
Independent	Dominic Marino	213	0.60	+0.60
Total formal votes		35,422	95.76	+0.41
Informal votes		1,567	4.24	−0.41
Turnout		36,989	91.50	+0.97
Notional two-party-preferred count
Labor	Fiona Richardson	26,833	75.9	−4.4
Liberal	Steve Moran	8,525	24.1	+4.4
Two-candidate-preferred result
Labor	Fiona Richardson	21,666	61.23	+2.71
Greens	Anne Martinelli	13,716	38.77	−2.71
Labor hold		Swing	+2.71	

=== Oakleigh ===
2010 Victorian state election: Oakleigh
Party	Candidate	Votes	%	±%
Labor	Ann Barker	12,888	40.97	−8.87
Liberal	Theo Zographos	12,616	40.11	+6.61
Greens	Eleanor Whyte	4,719	15.00	+1.45
Democratic Labor	Matthew Grinter	488	1.55	+1.55
Family First	George Grigas	423	1.34	−1.76
Independent	Alan Ide	323	1.03	+1.03
Total formal votes		31,457	95.61	−0.74
Informal votes		1,444	4.39	+0.74
Turnout		32,901	92.41	+0.21
Two-party-preferred result
Labor	Ann Barker	17,268	54.82	−7.55
Liberal	Theo Zographos	14,234	45.18	+7.55
Labor hold		Swing	−7.55	

=== Pascoe Vale ===
2010 Victorian state election: Pascoe Vale
Party	Candidate	Votes	%	±%
Labor	Christine Campbell	18,795	53.73	−6.53
Liberal	Claude Tomisich	9,823	28.08	+4.63
Greens	Liam Farrelly	5,683	16.25	+4.03
Independent	Alf Hickey	679	1.94	+1.94
Total formal votes		34,980	94.01	+0.50
Informal votes		2,227	5.99	−0.50
Turnout		37,207	91.28	+0.53
Two-party-preferred result
Labor	Christine Campbell	23,738	67.80	−4.98
Liberal	Claude Tomisich	11,272	32.20	+4.98
Labor hold		Swing	−4.98	

=== Polwarth ===
2010 Victorian state election: Polwarth
Party	Candidate	Votes	%	±%
Liberal	Terry Mulder	21,245	55.31	+1.79
Labor	Brian Crook	10,432	27.16	−1.76
Greens	Natalie Atherden	3,235	8.42	−1.19
Country Alliance	Garry Kerr	1,502	3.91	+3.91
Family First	John Modra	1,211	3.15	−1.11
Independent	Grant Beale	784	2.04	+2.04
Total formal votes		38,409	96.15	−0.34
Informal votes		1,539	3.85	+0.34
Turnout		39,948	94.94	+1.00
Two-party-preferred result
Liberal	Terry Mulder	24,351	63.29	+2.60
Labor	Brian Crook	14,127	36.71	−2.60
Liberal hold		Swing	+2.60	

=== Prahran ===
2010 Victorian state election: Prahran
Party	Candidate	Votes	%	±%
Liberal	Clem Newton-Brown	16,197	47.95	+6.08
Labor	Tony Lupton	9,384	27.78	−8.94
Greens	Meni Christofakis	6,685	19.79	−0.34
Sex Party	Christian Vega	1,073	3.18	+3.18
Independent	Katharine Anderson	239	0.71	+0.71
Family First	Simon Ronchi	198	0.59	−0.69
Total formal votes		33,776	96.77	+0.46
Informal votes		1,128	3.23	−0.46
Turnout		34,904	88.91	+3.94
Two-party-preferred result
Liberal	Clem Newton-Brown	18,460	54.80	+8.33
Labor	Tony Lupton	15,226	45.20	−8.33
Liberal gain from Labor		Swing	+8.33	

=== Preston ===
2010 Victorian state election: Preston
Party	Candidate	Votes	%	±%
Labor	Robin Scott	17,400	52.65	−8.93
Liberal	Adin McGarvie	8,593	26.00	+5.67
Greens	Trent McCarthy	7,058	21.35	+7.67
Total formal votes		33,051	93.71	+0.49
Informal votes		2,219	6.29	−0.49
Turnout		35,270	91.23	+0.08
Two-party-preferred result
Labor	Robin Scott	23,250	70.38	−4.92
Liberal	Adin McGarvie	9,783	29.62	+4.92
Labor hold		Swing	−4.92	

=== Richmond ===
2010 Victorian state election: Richmond
Party	Candidate	Votes	%	±%
Labor	Richard Wynne	13,328	37.26	−9.15
Greens	Kathleen Maltzahn	10,174	28.44	+3.76
Liberal	Tom McFeely	8,154	22.79	+2.91
Independent	Stephen Jolly	3,097	8.66	+3.02
Sex Party	Angela White	1,020	2.85	+2.85
Total formal votes		35,773	96.37	+0.80
Informal votes		1,348	3.63	−0.80
Turnout		37,121	88.33	+2.01
Notional two-party-preferred count
Labor	Richard Wynne	25,130	70.25	−4.92
Liberal	Tom McFeely	10,643	29.75	+4.92
Two-candidate-preferred result
Labor	Richard Wynne	20,212	56.46	+1.58
Greens	Kathleen Maltzahn	15,589	43.54	−1.58
Labor hold		Swing	+1.58	

=== Ripon ===
2010 Victorian state election: Ripon
Party	Candidate	Votes	%	±%
Labor	Joe Helper	14,169	42.06	−4.73
Liberal	Vic Dunn	11,596	34.42	−0.84
National	Wendy McIvor	3,850	11.43	+2.92
Greens	Steve Morse	2,084	6.19	+0.23
Country Alliance	Scott Watts	1,211	3.59	+3.59
Family First	Jesse Boer	776	2.30	−1.18
Total formal votes		33,686	95.36	−0.94
Informal votes		1,640	4.64	+0.94
Turnout		35,326	93.90	−0.17
Two-party-preferred result
Labor	Joe Helper	17,777	52.72	−1.63
Liberal	Vic Dunn	15,940	47.28	+1.63
Labor hold		Swing	−1.63	

=== Rodney ===
2010 Victorian state election: Rodney
Party	Candidate	Votes	%	±%
National	Paul Weller	20,524	62.71	+22.55
Labor	Vanessa Langford	5,290	16.16	−1.97
Country Alliance	Gino D'Angelo	3,697	11.30	+11.30
Family First	Serena Moore	1,872	5.72	+2.33
Greens	Ian Christoe	1,348	4.12	+0.92
Total formal votes		32,731	95.59	+0.82
Informal votes		1,509	4.41	−0.82
Turnout		34,240	93.97	−0.34
Two-party-preferred result
National	Paul Weller	24,947	76.16	+21.96
Labor	Vanessa Langford	7,809	23.84	+23.84
National hold		Swing	+21.96	

=== Sandringham ===
2010 Victorian state election: Sandringham
Party	Candidate	Votes	%	±%
Liberal	Murray Thompson	20,704	60.90	+8.27
Labor	Robbie Nyaguy	7,313	21.51	−7.85
Greens	Derek Wilson	5,430	15.97	+3.23
Family First	Malcolm Reid	548	1.61	−0.51
Total formal votes		33,995	96.28	−0.68
Informal votes		1,314	3.72	+0.68
Turnout		35,309	93.34	−0.08
Two-party-preferred result
Liberal	Murray Thompson	22,417	65.93	+7.25
Labor	Robbie Nyaguy	11,584	34.07	−7.25
Liberal hold		Swing	+7.25	

=== Scoresby ===
2010 Victorian state election: Scoresby
Party	Candidate	Votes	%	±%
Liberal	Kim Wells	20,745	59.05	+5.93
Labor	Garry Nightingale	10,388	29.57	−2.82
Greens	Salore Craig	2,821	8.03	+1.52
Family First	Rachel Hanna	1,178	3.35	−3.42
Total formal votes		35,132	95.57	−0.36
Informal votes		1,627	4.43	+0.36
Turnout		36,759	93.96	−0.16
Two-party-preferred result
Liberal	Kim Wells	22,259	64.14	+2.97
Labor	Garry Nightingale	12,598	35.86	−2.97
Liberal hold		Swing	+2.97	

=== Seymour ===
2010 Victorian state election: Seymour
Party	Candidate	Votes	%	±%
Liberal	Cindy McLeish	12,992	35.63	−2.80
Labor	Ben Hardman	12,813	35.14	−11.28
Independent	Jan Beer	3,738	10.25	+10.25
Greens	Huw Slater	3,230	8.86	−0.47
Country Alliance	Adam Taurian	1,587	4.35	+4.35
National	Anthony Rolando	1,391	3.81	+3.81
Family First	Robert Guerra	711	1.95	−1.38
Total formal votes		36,462	94.91	−1.21
Informal votes		1,955	5.09	+1.21
Turnout		38,417	93.47	−0.55
Two-party-preferred result
Liberal	Cindy McLeish	18,728	51.25	+8.07
Labor	Ben Hardman	17,811	48.75	−8.07
Liberal gain from Labor		Swing	+8.07	

=== Shepparton ===
2010 Victorian state election: Shepparton
Party	Candidate	Votes	%	±%
National	Jeanette Powell	17,609	52.9	+4.5
Country Alliance	Dennis Patterson	6,826	20.5	+20.5
Labor	Anthony Fullarton	5,245	15.8	−3.2
Greens	Lachlan Slade	1,631	4.9	+0.2
Independent	Paul Wickham	958	2.9	+2.9
Family First	Malcolm Moore	769	2.3	+0.3
Independent	Shannon Smith	232	0.7	+0.7
Total formal votes		33,270	94.4	−0.6
Informal votes		1,955	5.6	+0.6
Turnout		35,225	92.4	−1.1
Notional two-party-preferred count
National	Jeanette Powell	25,376	76.0	+1.3
Labor	Anthony Fullarton	8,027	24.0	−1.3
Two-candidate-preferred result
National	Jeanette Powell	20,041	60.2	−14.4
Country Alliance	Dennis Patterson	13,329	39.8	+39.8
National hold				

=== South Barwon ===
2010 Victorian state election: South Barwon
Party	Candidate	Votes	%	±%
Liberal	Andrew Katos	20,133	45.93	+4.76
Labor	Michael Crutchfield	15,759	35.95	−7.99
Greens	Simon Northeast	4,208	9.60	+0.56
Independent	Heather Wellington	1,185	2.70	+2.70
Family First	Kathleen O'Connor	810	1.85	−2.81
Democratic Labor	Alan Barron	577	1.32	+1.32
Country Alliance	Tony Leen	547	1.25	+1.25
Independent	John Dobinson	323	0.74	+0.74
Independent	Keith Oakley	295	0.67	+0.67
Total formal votes		43,837	95.73	−1.20
Informal votes		1,955	4.27	+1.20
Turnout		45,792	94.79	+0.95
Two-party-preferred result
Liberal	Andrew Katos	23,675	53.94	+6.34
Labor	Michael Crutchfield	20,218	46.06	−6.34
Liberal gain from Labor		Swing	+6.34	

=== South-West Coast ===
2010 Victorian state election: South-West Coast
Party	Candidate	Votes	%	±%
Liberal	Denis Napthine	19,316	49.28	+3.98
Labor	John Herbertson	9,658	24.64	−13.68
Independent	James Purcell	4,519	11.53	+11.53
Greens	Jack Howard	3,228	8.24	+2.86
Country Alliance	Tony Arscott	1,394	3.56	+3.56
Family First	Craig Haberfield	1,081	2.76	−0.64
Total formal votes		39,196	95.97	+0.16
Informal votes		1,644	4.04	−0.16
Turnout		40,840	94.22	+0.85
Two-party-preferred result
Liberal	Denis Napthine	24,252	61.90	+7.89
Labor	John Herbertson	14,926	38.10	−7.89
Liberal hold		Swing	+7.89	

=== Swan Hill ===
2010 Victorian state election: Swan Hill
Party	Candidate	Votes	%	±%
National	Peter Walsh	22,086	75.04	+27.61
Labor	Sharon Garrick	4,802	16.32	−2.19
Greens	Morgana Russell	1,326	4.51	+0.57
Family First	Garion Pearse	1,219	4.14	+0.81
Total formal votes		29,433	95.33	+0.00
Informal votes		1,441	4.67	+0.00
Turnout		30,874	93.35	−0.42
Two-party-preferred result
National	Peter Walsh	23,343	79.33	+5.93
Labor	Sharon Garrick	6,081	20.67	−5.93
National hold		Swing	+5.93	

=== Tarneit ===
2010 Victorian state election: Tarneit
Party	Candidate	Votes	%	±%
Labor	Tim Pallas	20,521	49.08	−4.32
Liberal	Glenn Goodfellow	13,458	32.19	+4.64
Greens	Bro Sheffield-Brotherton	3,716	8.89	+2.51
Family First	Lori McLean	2,128	5.09	−1.29
Democratic Labor	Michael Freeman	1,988	4.75	+4.75
Total formal votes		41,811	94.38	−0.31
Informal votes		2,492	5.62	+0.31
Turnout		44,303	92.72	−1.11
Two-party-preferred result
Labor	Tim Pallas	25,553	61.13	−1.34
Liberal	Glenn Goodfellow	16,248	38.87	+1.34
Labor hold		Swing	−1.34	

=== Thomastown ===
2010 Victorian state election: Thomastown
Party	Candidate	Votes	%	±%
Labor	Bronwyn Halfpenny	19,190	61.29	−12.73
Liberal	Michael Burge	7,591	24.25	+9.47
Greens	Andrew Calleja	2,952	9.43	+2.87
Family First	Jacquie McIntosh	1,576	5.03	+0.39
Total formal votes		31,309	92.02	+0.14
Informal votes		2,716	7.98	−0.14
Turnout		34,025	92.33	−0.66
Two-party-preferred result
Labor	Bronwyn Halfpenny	22,025	70.19	−10.88
Liberal	Michael Burge	9,356	29.81	+10.88
Labor hold		Swing	−10.88	

=== Warrandyte ===
2010 Victorian state election: Warrandyte
Party	Candidate	Votes	%	±%
Liberal	Ryan Smith	22,150	58.53	+7.73
Labor	Meghan Hopper	9,920	26.21	−2.98
Greens	Chris Padgham	4,221	11.15	−3.19
Family First	Yasmin De Zilwa	1,106	2.92	−2.75
Independent	Paul Slattery	446	1.18	+1.18
Total formal votes		37,843	96.31	−0.39
Informal votes		1,448	3.69	+0.39
Turnout		39,291	94.74	+0.61
Two-party-preferred result
Liberal	Ryan Smith	24,176	63.87	+4.88
Labor	Meghan Hopper	13,675	36.13	−4.88
Liberal hold		Swing	+4.88	

=== Williamstown ===
2010 Victorian state election: Williamstown
Party	Candidate	Votes	%	±%
Labor	Wade Noonan	15,859	46.75	−14.95
Liberal	David McConnell	11,023	32.50	+11.82
Greens	Paul Fogarty	7,040	20.75	+8.39
Total formal votes		33,922	94.52	−0.15
Informal votes		1,965	5.48	+0.15
Turnout		35,887	92.10	+0.31
Two-party-preferred result
Labor	Wade Noonan	20,973	61.84	−12.41
Liberal	David McConnell	12,941	38.16	+12.41
Labor hold		Swing	−12.41	

=== Yan Yean ===
2010 Victorian state election: Yan Yean
Party	Candidate	Votes	%	±%
Labor	Danielle Green	20,990	42.90	−4.53
Liberal	Jack Gange	19,612	40.08	+5.45
Greens	Karin Geradts	4,916	10.05	+0.47
Democratic Labor	Patrick Shea	1,728	3.53	+3.53
Family First	Andrew McPherson	1,684	3.44	−0.02
Total formal votes		48,930	95.09	−1.11
Informal votes		2,527	4.91	+1.11
Turnout		51,457	95.05	+0.35
Two-party-preferred result
Labor	Danielle Green	26,498	54.07	−3.92
Liberal	Jack Gange	22,506	45.93	+3.92
Labor hold		Swing	−3.92	

=== Yuroke ===
2010 Victorian state election: Yuroke
Party	Candidate	Votes	%	±%
Labor	Liz Beattie	23,537	55.22	−7.99
Liberal	Philip Cutler	13,259	31.11	+7.18
Greens	Graham Dawson	4,128	9.68	+2.12
Family First	Ian Cranson	1,702	3.99	−1.30
Total formal votes		42,626	93.68	−1.42
Informal votes		2,876	6.32	+1.42
Turnout		45,502	93.96	−0.35
Two-party-preferred result
Labor	Liz Beattie	27,841	65.29	−4.90
Liberal	Philip Cutler	14,802	34.71	+4.90
Labor hold		Swing	−4.90	

== See also ==
- Results of the 2010 Victorian state election (Legislative Council)
- 2010 Victorian state election
- Candidates of the 2010 Victorian state election
- Members of the Victorian Legislative Assembly, 2010–2014
