= Inga Peulich =

Australian politician (1956–2024)

Member of the Victorian Legislative Assembly for Bentleigh
- In office 3 October 1992 – 30 November 2002
- Preceded by: Ann Barker
- Succeeded by: Rob Hudson

Member of the Victorian Legislative Council for South-Eastern Metropolitan Region
- In office 25 November 2006 – 24 November 2018

Personal details
- Born: Inga Došen; 15 October 1956 Sarajevo, PR Bosnia and Herzegovina, FPR Yugoslavia
- Died: 25 July 2024 (aged 67)
- Party: Liberal Party
- Spouse: Savo Peulich
- Children: Paul Peulich
- Education: Monash University
- Occupation: Member of the Victorian Parliament
- Portfolio: Shadow Minister for Multicultural Affairs, Scrutiny of Government

Inga Peulich (/ˈpaʊlɪtʃ/; née Došen (15 October 1956 − 25 July 2024) was an Australian politician. She was a member of the Victorian Legislative Council representing South Eastern Metropolitan Region from 2006 to 2018 and before that the Member for Bentleigh from 1992 to 2002.

From 2014 to 2018, Peulich served as the Victorian Liberal Party's Shadow Minister for Multicultural Affairs and Shadow Minister for Scrutiny of Government.

== Early life and education ==
Inga Peulich was of Bosnian heritage, being born Inga Došen in Bosnia and Herzegovina and migrated to Australia in 1967 with her family.

Peulich obtained a Bachelor of Arts and a master's degree in education from Monash University. Before her election as the Liberal Member for Bentleigh in the Victorian Legislative Assembly, Peulich taught VCE English and Psychology, and was English faculty head in a large government school in the south-east region of Melbourne.

== Political career ==
In 1989, Inga Peulich joined the Moorabbin branch of the Liberal Party and a year later was elected to the Moorabbin City Council. She was a Liberal member of the Victorian Legislative Assembly from 1992 to 2002, representing the electorate of Bentleigh. She was one of many Liberal members elected in Jeff Kennett's landslide win at the 1992 election. In 1992, Peulich expressed opposition to aspects of the proposed expansion of Westfield Southland.

Peulich was defeated at the 2002 election, but returned to parliament at the 2006 election, being elected to the Legislative Council as a member for the South Eastern Metropolitan Region. She was re-elected to the Legislative Council in 2010 and 2014.

Following various parliamentary committee appointments, Peulich was promoted to Shadow Parliamentary Secretary for Education and Communities in February 2008. Following the election of the Baillieu Liberal/National Coalition at the 2010 Victorian state election, Peulich was appointed Secretary to Liberal Parliamentary Party and Coalition, and in March 2013, was promoted to Parliamentary Secretary for Education.

Following the 2010 state election, Peulich was credited with playing a significant role in winning a swag of south-east metropolitan "sandbelt" seats to secure a one seat majority win for the Liberal/National Coalition government.

In March 2014, Peulich was appointed Cabinet Secretary in the Napthine Ministry.

Peulich was considered to be from the conservative faction of the Liberal Party. In 2017, she opposed the trial of a safe injecting room in Richmond, and assisted dying legislation.

Following the defeat of the Liberal-National coalition government at the 2014 Victorian state election, Peulich was appointed to the shadow cabinet as the Shadow Minister for Multicultural Affairs and Scrutiny of Government, a position she held until her electoral defeat. Peulich lost her seat at the 2018 Victorian election when the Liberal Party vote fell to 28% in the South East Metropolitan region.

=== LGBT youth ===
Peulich raised the ire of some sections of Victorian society for her stance against initiatives such as the Safe Schools Program and certain rights for same-sex couples. In a 2017 edition of the Quarterly Essay, Peulich was cited as stating that the Safe Schools programme was "frightening", and that it cultivated in children "an isolation from their own families and their own values".

=== Multiculturalism ===
In 2007, Peulich employed 'race blogger' Gary Anderton, himself of mixed race and with Aboriginal family members, as an adviser. On his blog in 2004, he had published material that 'declared that Aborigines are congenitally drunk and violent [and] terror suspect David Hicks should be executed.'

In 2016, Peulich was called a 'racist' by a Liberal Party member, who later withdrew the claim and made a public apology to Peulich.

In 2018, Peulich labelled Victorian Greens MP Samantha Ratnam a "pig" in the Victorian parliament in a debate about 'increasing gender and cultural diversity in parliaments'.

== Post-parliamentary career ==
In early 2020, Peulich opposed the immediate sacking of the 11 councillors of Casey Council until the investigation into allegations against a number of councillors by IBAC had been completed. Susan Serey, the mayor of the City of Casey prior to its dismissal, was considered a protege of Peulich.

In December 2020, an IBAC hearing into the City of Casey was told that, in 2014, Peulich was expected “to go into bat” for a developer as part of an effort to rezone "green wedge" land in Baxter. The rezoning proposal in question was eventually rejected by the Victorian planning minister and there was no finding by IBAC of any impropriety by Peulich.

== Personal life ==
Peulich's husband Savo, son Paul, and mother Nena Dosen, all ran as candidates at the 2003 election for the Glen Eira City Council.^{[9]} In 2008, Paul was elected to the Kingston City Council and served as Mayor of Kingston for 2013–2014.

In 2012 and 2013, a number of articles were run in The Age newspaper accusing Peulich of intervening directly on behalf of her son in his mayoral bid.

Peulich's husband, Savo, unsuccessfully ran for election in Caruana Ward of the City of Kingston in 2020 and again in 2024, gaining 14% and 9% of the primary vote respectively.

Peulich died on 25 July 2024, at the age of 67.

Victorian Legislative Assembly
Preceded by Ann Barker	Member for Bentleigh; 1992–2002	Succeeded by Rob Hudson
Preceded by Bob Smith	Member for South Eastern Metropolitan Region; 2006–2018	Succeeded by David Limbrick
