= Nick Staikos =

Australian politician

The Honourable Nick Staikos MP
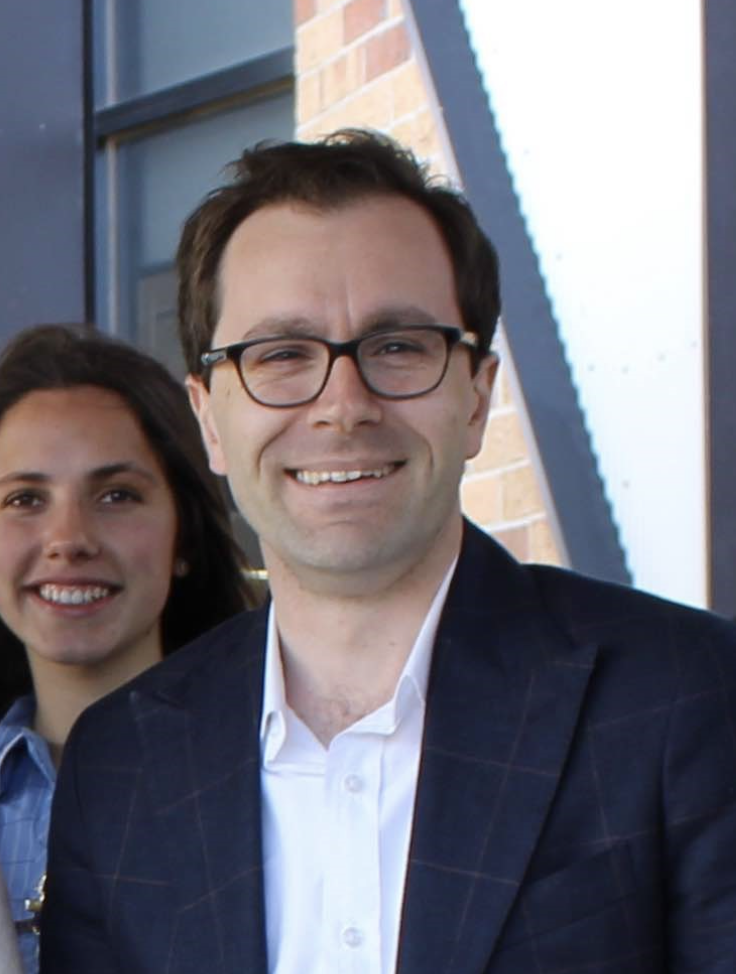
- Staikos at McKinnon Secondary College

Minister for Housing, Building and Precincts
- Incumbent
- Assumed office 4 August 2026
- Premier: Ben Carroll
- Preceded by: Himself (as Minister for Housing and Building) Jaclyn Symes (as Minister for Development Victoria and Precincts)

Minister for Homelessness
- Incumbent
- Assumed office 4 August 2026
- Premier: Ben Carroll
- Preceded by: Position established

Minister for Seniors
- Incumbent
- Assumed office 4 August 2026
- Premier: Ben Carroll
- Preceded by: Ingrid Stitt (as Minister for Ageing)
Other ministerial offices
Minister for Housing and Building
In office 15 April 2026 – 4 August 2026
Premier	Jacinta Allan
Preceded by	Harriet Shing
Succeeded by	Himself (as Minister for Housing, Building and Precincts)
Minister for the Suburban Rail Loop
In office 15 April 2026 – 4 August 2026
Premier	Jacinta Allan
Preceded by	Harriet Shing
Succeeded by	Position abolished
Minister for Consumer Affairs
In office 19 December 2024 – 15 April 2026
Premier	Jacinta Allan
Preceded by	Danny Pearson
Succeeded by	Paul Edbrooke
Minister for Local Government
In office 19 December 2024 – 15 April 2026
Premier	Jacinta Allan
Preceded by	Melissa Horne
Succeeded by	Paul Hamer

Member of the Victorian Legislative Assembly for Bentleigh
- Incumbent
- Assumed office 29 November 2014
- Preceded by: Elizabeth Miller

Personal details
- Born: 4 July 1986 (age 40) Moorabbin, Victoria, Australia
- Party: Labor
- Education: Monash University
- Occupation: Politician
- Website: www.nickstaikos.com.au

Nicholas Staikos (born 4 July 1986) is an Australian politician who has served as the Minister for Housing, Building and Precincts, Minister for Homelessness and Minister for Seniors since August 2026. He has been a Labor Party member of the Victorian Legislative Assembly since November 2014, representing the seat of Bentleigh."Bentleigh Results". ABC News.

Staikos entered the ministry in December 2024 as Minister for Consumer Affairs and Minister for Local Government. He subsequently served as Minister for Housing and Building and Minister for the Suburban Rail Loop from April to August 2026, before being appointed to his current portfolios following the formation of the Carroll ministry on 4 August 2026.

== Career ==
In 2005, Staikos was elected to Glen Eira Council. At 19, he was the youngest person ever elected to that council. He was re-elected in 2008, but resigned in 2009 following the passage of legislation that banned people employed by members of Parliament from serving in local government. Following his resignation, he was appointed an honorary life member of the East Bentleigh Senior Citizens Club in recognition of his service. He was also appointed President of Godfrey Street Community House.

Staikos has worked for a number of MPs in state and federal parliaments, including Simon Crean, Clare O'Neil, Judith Graley and Ann Barker.

He was elected to the Victorian Parliament in 2014 in the seat of Bentleigh by a margin of just 0.8 per cent. During Staikos' first term, the electorate underwent significant changes, including the removal of three level crossings, major upgrades to schools and the return of St Kilda Football Club to Moorabbin. He was easily re-elected in 2018, achieving a swing of more than 11 per cent. Following this election, Staikos was appointed Secretary of the State Parliamentary Labor Party and Deputy Government Whip. He was appointed Parliamentary Secretary to the Treasurer in 2020. He was then appointed Parliamentary Secretary to the Premier in June 2022.

Originally a member of Labor Right, Staikos joined Labor Left along with six of his colleagues shortly after the 2022 Victorian state election, resulting in Labor Left constituting a majority of the state Labor caucus.

In October 2023, Staikos became the Parliamentary Secretary for Multicultural Affairs, whilst continuing in his role as the Parliamentary Secretary to the Premier.

== Personal life ==
Staikos was born in Moorabbin Hospital, and attended local primary and secondary schools. He is of Greek descent. Staikos graduated from Monash University in 2009 with a Bachelor of Arts (Honours).

Victorian Legislative Assembly
Preceded by Elizabeth Miller	Member for Bentleigh; 2014–present	Incumbent
