= Gordon Hockley =

Australian politician

Member of the Victorian Legislative Assembly for Bentleigh
- In office 5 May 1979 – 1 October 1988
- Preceded by: Bob Suggett
- Succeeded by: Ann Barker

Personal details
- Born: Victoria
- Party: Labor Party
- Children: 4

Gordon Stanley Hockley (24 July 1926 – 11 May 2002) was an Australian politician.

He was born in Albury to motor mechanic Stanley Bertram Hockley and nurse Frances McIntosh. He attended local state schools and became a clerk with Victorian Railways in Melbourne from 1942 to 1945, before serving with the Royal Australian Navy from 1945 to 1972. He was a cook attached to an admiral's staff with the Commonwealth Occupation Forces in Japan, and then a lieutenant in charge of catering training. On 17 October 1947 he married Joyce Eileen Carne; they had four sons. On his return he was a lieutenant in the Royal Australian Navy Emergency Reserve, and a catering manager at Royal Southern Memorial Hospital in Caulfield from 1972 to 1979. In 1979 he was elected to the Victorian Legislative Assembly as the Labor member for Bentleigh. He served until his retirement in 1988. Hockley died in 2002.

Victorian Legislative Assembly
Preceded by Bob Suggett	Member for Bentleigh; 1979–1988	Succeeded by Ann Barker
