= Bob Suggett =

Australian politician (1911–1982)

Robert Harris Suggett (3 September 1911 – 28 October 1982) was an Australian politician.

== Biography ==
Suggett was born in St Arnaud to draper George Suggett and Florence Alexandra Penberthy. He attended Scotch College and then worked for the Bank of New South Wales. He served in the Royal Australian Air Force during World War II as a wireless operator, and actively opposed bank nationalisation in 1947. In 1955, he was elected to the Victorian Legislative Assembly as the Liberal member for Moorabbin. He lost party endorsement in 1961 but was re-elected as an Independent Liberal, and was re-admitted to the party in 1964. In 1967 he moved to the seat of Bentleigh, which he held until he was defeated in 1979. Suggett died at East Bentleigh in 1982.

Victorian Legislative Assembly
| New seat | Member for Moorabbin; 1955–1967 | Succeeded by Llew Reese |
| New seat | Member for Bentleigh; 1967–1979 | Succeeded by Gordon Hockley |
