= Elizabeth Miller (politician) =

Australian politician

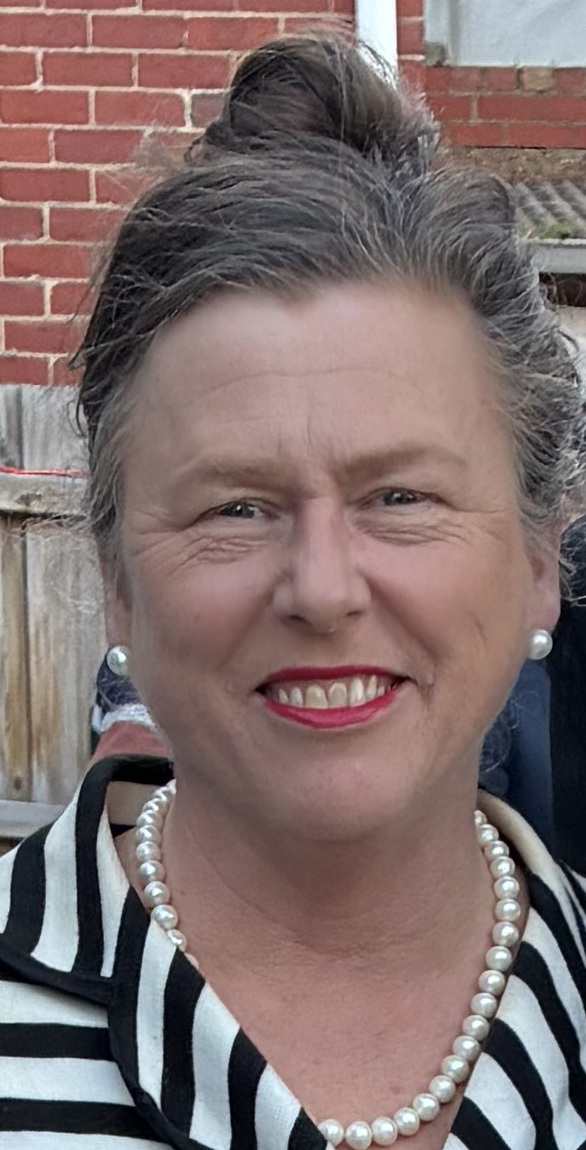

Member of the Victorian Legislative Assembly for Bentleigh
- In office 27 November 2010 – 29 November 2014
- Preceded by: Rob Hudson
- Succeeded by: Nick Staikos

Personal details
- Party: Liberal Party
- Profession: Nurse

Elizabeth Miller (born 1967) is a former Australian politician who was elected in the 2010 Victorian state election for the electoral district of Bentleigh, defeating the then incumbent Labor MP Rob Hudson. She served as the MP for Bentleigh for four years before losing the seat in 2014 to Nick Staikos of the Labor Party.

== Career ==
Elizabeth Miller was the member for Bentleigh from 2010 to her defeat in 2014.

She unsuccessfully contested Liberal Party preselection for the Electoral district of Nepean in 2022, but was defeated by fellow nominees Sam Groth and David Burgess by 74 and 33 votes respectively, to Miller’s four.

Parliament of Victoria
Preceded by Rob Hudson	Member for Bentleigh; 2010–2014	Succeeded by Nick Staikos
