= Rob Hudson =

Australian politician

Member of the Victorian Legislative Assembly for Bentleigh
- In office 30 November 2002 – 27 November 2010
- Preceded by: Inga Peulich
- Succeeded by: Elizabeth Miller

Personal details
- Party: Labor Party

Robert John "Rob" Hudson is a former Australian politician. He holds honours degrees in social work and law, and was a member of the Victorian Legislative Assembly for the Labor Party. He was elected to the Bentleigh electorate in the 2002 state election defeating incumbent Inga Peulich, and was re-elected in 2006 before being defeated in 2010.

== Career ==
Prior to his election as the member for Bentleigh, he worked at the Brotherhood of St Laurence, and was the director of the Victorian Council of Social Service. In 1993, he became senior advisor to the Deputy Prime Minister of Australia. He held this position for three years before becoming the CEO of WorkPlacement. From 1999, he held the position of social policy director to the Premier of Victoria. After being elected to parliament in 2002, he became the Chair of the Victorian Parliamentary Law Reform Committee from 2002 to 2006, the Parliamentary Secretary for Infrastructure from 2006 to 2007, the Parliamentary Secretary for Public Transport and the Arts from 2007 to 2009, and Parliamentary Secretary to the Premier and for the Arts in 2010. He was a supporter of abortion law reform in 2008 and voted for the bill.

Hudson was defeated in the 2010 Victorian state election by Elizabeth Miller of the Liberal Party, losing by just 441 votes. His defeat allowed the Liberal-National Party Coalition to form government by one seat.

Victorian Legislative Assembly
Preceded by Inga Peulich	Member for Bentleigh; 2002–2010	Succeeded by Elizabeth Miller
