= Electoral district of Bentleigh =

State electoral district of Victoria, Australia

Bentleigh Victoria—Legislative Assembly
- Interactive map of electoral district boundaries from the 2022 state election
- State: Victoria
- Created: 1967
- MP: Nick Staikos
- Party: Labor
- Namesake: Suburb of Bentleigh
- Electors: 51,415 (2022)
- Area: 25 km^{2} (9.7 sq mi)
- Demographic: Metropolitan
- Coordinates: 37°55′S 145°03′E

The electoral district of Bentleigh is an electoral district of the Victorian Legislative Assembly. It covers an area of 25 square kilometres (9.7 sq mi) in southern Melbourne, including the suburbs of Bentleigh, Hampton East, McKinnon, and Moorabbin, and parts of Cheltenham, Bentleigh East, Brighton East and Ormond. It also includes the Moorabbin campus of the Monash Medical Centre. It lies within the Southern Metropolitan Region of the upper house, the Legislative Council.

Bentleigh has usually been seen as a key marginal seat, lying at the 'point of the pendulum' needed to change government. It is considered a bellwether seat in Victoria, having elected a member of the governing party in all but two elections of its existence.

It was created in 1967 as a fairly safe Liberal seat during the height of the Victorian Liberals' popularity. It remained in Liberal hands until 1979 where the Liberals nearly lost their majority for the first time in just under three decades. For most of the time since then, it has been a marginal seat, and is part of the belt of marginal seats in eastern Melbourne that usually decide elections in Victoria.

Labor then held the seat until the Kennett landslide of 1992. Following this, the seat was narrowly held by Inga Peulich until she was defeated by Rob Hudson in the 2002 election. In the 2010 election the seat returned to the Liberal Party with Elizabeth Miller narrowly defeating Hudson. Bentleigh was the last seat to be decided, and Miller's victory allowed the Coalition to form government by one seat. In turn, Miller was defeated by Labor candidate Nick Staikos at the 2014 election. Staikos picked up a hefty swing of over 11 percent in Labor's landslide victory of 2018, and was comfortably re-elected in 2022, with a margin of 8%.

== Members for Bentleigh ==
Member	Party	Term
Bob Suggett	Liberal	1967–1979
Gordon Hockley	Labor	1979–1988
Ann Barker	Labor	1988–1992
Inga Peulich	Liberal	1992–2002
Rob Hudson	Labor	2002–2010
Elizabeth Miller	Liberal	2010–2014
Nick Staikos	Labor	2014–present

== Election results ==
2022 Victorian state election: Bentleigh
Party	Candidate	Votes	%	±%
Labor	Nick Staikos	20,656	45.8	−3.9
Liberal	Debbie Taylor-Haynes	16,401	36.3	+3.0
Greens	Alana Galli-McRostie	4,845	10.7	+2.5
Family First	Paul Ryan	1,331	2.9	+2.9
Animal Justice	David Harris	1,098	2.4	+0.7
Ind. (Fusion)	Simon Gnieslaw	789	1.7	+1.7
Total formal votes		45,120	97.0	+3.2
Informal votes		1,408	3.0	−3.2
Turnout		46,528	90.5	−0.5
Two-party-preferred result
Labor	Nick Staikos	26,153	58.0	−3.4
Liberal	Debbie Taylor-Haynes	18,972	42.0	+3.4
Labor hold		Swing	−3.4	

Two-party-preferred vote results in Bentleigh View source data.
