= Ann Barker =

Australian politician

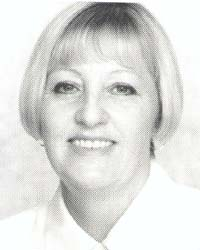

Member of the Victorian Legislative Assembly for Bentleigh
- In office 1 October 1988 – 3 October 1992
- Preceded by: Gordon Hockley
- Succeeded by: Inga Peulich

Member of the Victorian Legislative Assembly for Oakleigh
- In office 18 September 1999 – 29 November 2014
- Preceded by: Denise McGill
- Succeeded by: Steve Dimopoulos

Personal details
- Born: 19 January 1952 (age 74) Tasmania
- Party: Labor Party
- Children: 2
- Website: annbarker.net

Ann Patricia Barker (born 19 January 1952) is a former Australian politician. She was a Labor Party member of the Victorian Legislative Assembly from 1999 to 2014, representing the electorate of Oakleigh. She previously represented the electorate of Bentleigh from 1988 to 1992.

Barker was born in Tasmania. She worked as an electorate officer to former federal MP Joan Child before being elected to the Victorian Legislative Assembly seat of Bentleigh at the 1988 state election, succeeding retiring ALP member Gordon Hockley. She was seen as a potential ministerial candidate towards the end of her first term, but was twice overlooked by then-Premier Joan Kirner. These ambitions were to be short-lived, as she was one of many Labor members to be defeated amidst the party's landslide defeat at the 1992 state election, losing to Liberal Inga Peulich.

After her 1992 election defeat, Barker was employed as an advisor to federal MP Simon Crean, then a minister in the Keating government. She left Crean's office in 1996 to work as an office manager with the Victorian Court Information and Welfare Network, but returned to Crean's office the following year. She was the Labor candidate for the seat of Oakleigh at the 1996 election, but was very narrowly defeated by incumbent Liberal member Denise McGill. She was again the Labor candidate for the seat at the 1999 election, having resisted pressure to stand aside for star candidate Mary Delahunty, and amidst the party's statewide victory, succeeded in defeating McGill.

Barker was appointed Parliamentary Secretary for Training and Higher Education after the party's victory at the 2002 election. A relatively low-profile MP, she spoke less than only one other member of either house of parliament in 2004. In 2006, she was a vocal supporter of Martin Pakula's unsuccessful challenge to the preselection of her former employer, Simon Crean. She was appointed Deputy Speaker of the Legislative Assembly after the 2006 election.

Parliament of Victoria
Preceded by Gordon Hockley	Member for Bentleigh; 1988–1992	Succeeded by Inga Peulich
Preceded by Denise McGill	Member for Oakleigh; 1999–2014	Succeeded by Steve Dimopoulos
