= 2010 Victorian state election =

Australian state election

- 27 November 2010

All 88 seats in the Victorian Legislative Assembly All 40 seats in the Victorian Legislative Council 45 seats needed for a majority
- Opinion polls
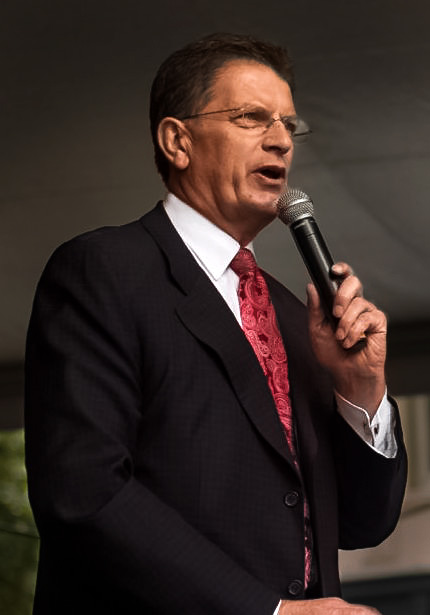

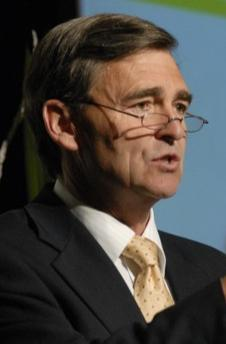
	First party	Second party
Leader	Ted Baillieu	John Brumby
Party	Liberal–National coalition	Labor
Leader since	8 May 2006	30 July 2007
Leader's seat	Hawthorn	Broadmeadows
Last election	32 seats	55 seats
Seats won	45	43
Seat change	▲13	▼12
Popular vote	1,417,146	1,147,348
Percentage	44.78%	36.25%
Swing	▲5.17	▼6.81
TPP	51.58%	48.42%
TPP swing	▲5.97	▼5.97
- Results in each electorate.
Premier before election
John Brumby
Labor
Premier after election
Ted Baillieu
Liberal/National coalition

The 2010 Victorian state election, held on Saturday, 27 November 2010, was for the 57th Parliament of Victoria. The election was to elect all 88 members of the Legislative Assembly and all 40 members of the Legislative Council.

The incumbent centre-left Labor Party government, led by John Brumby, was defeated by the centre-right Liberal/National Coalition opposition, led by Ted Baillieu. The election gave the Coalition a one-seat majority in both houses of parliament.

As of 2026, these are the most recent elections where the Liberal/National Coalition has won.

== Campaign ==
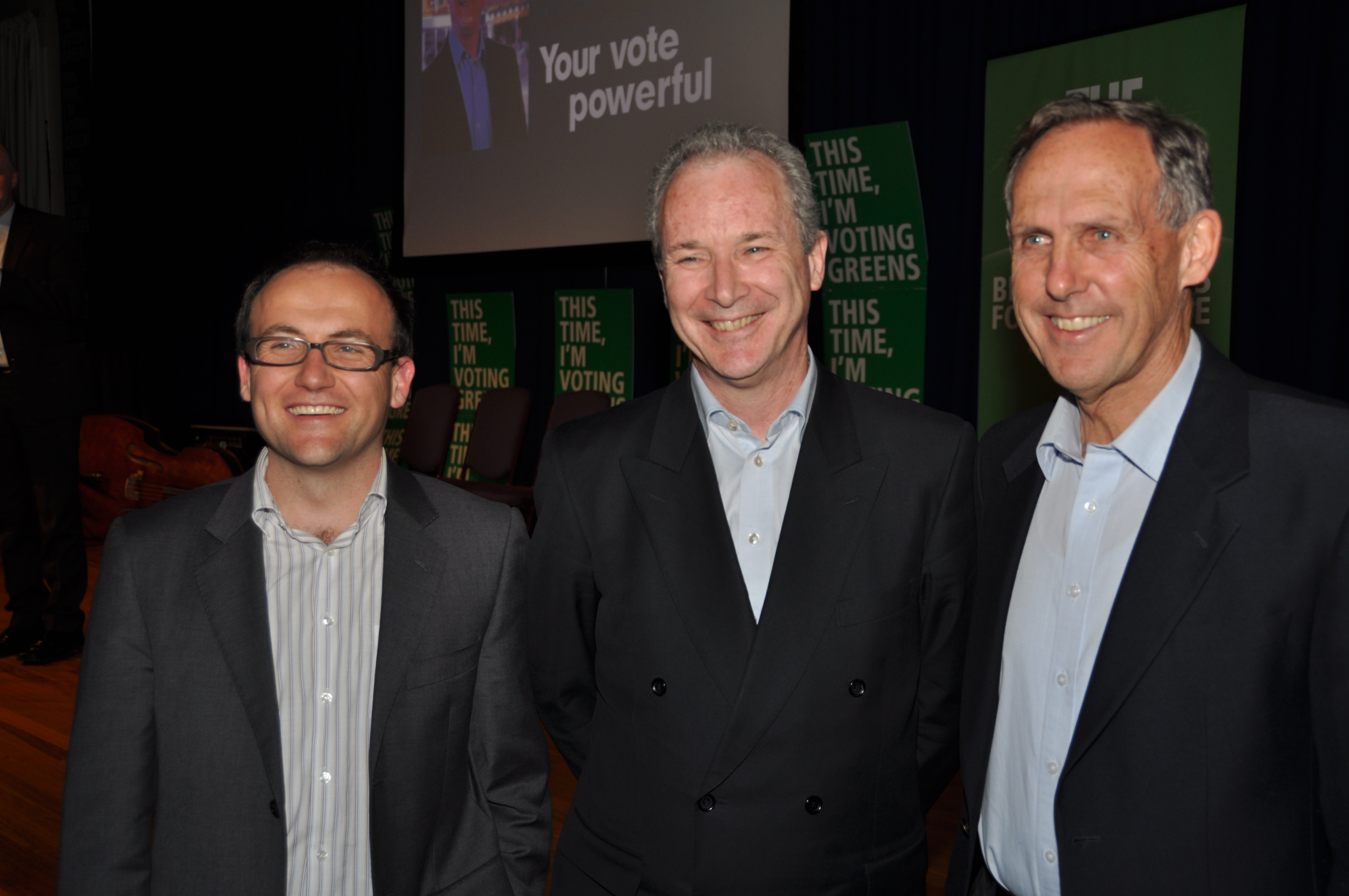
Adam Bandt, Brian Walters and Bob Brown of the Greens during the election campaign

The Liberal and National Parties contested the election as a Coalition, which they had not done since the previous agreement lapsed in 2000. The Liberal Party departed from tradition and gave their preferences to Labor ahead of the Greens, thereby decreasing the chances of the Greens winning up to four inner city seats from Labor.

The Coalition launched their campaign on 14 November 2010 at the Melbourne Convention and Exhibition Centre in the electoral district of Melbourne, with the slogan: "Fix the problems. Build the future." Labor launched their campaign on 16 November 2010 in the electoral district of Bendigo East, using the slogan: "For the times ahead." The Greens ran with the slogan "This time, I'm voting Green".

The only state leaders debate between The Victorian Labor Premier, John Brumby, and the Liberal Opposition Leader, Ted Baillieu was held on November 5, 2010 on the ABC. As of 2026, these are the most recent leaders debate that were on free TV instead of pay television Sky News Australia.

Baillieu's multicultural ministerial advisers helped in attracting multicultural votes towards the Liberal party in marginal seats that mattered. A large majority of the Victorian Indian community voted for the Liberal party.

== Issues ==
The Coalition campaigned heavily against the Brumby Government's new Myki ticketing system, which had been delivered at triple the projected cost and years behind schedule, as well as its construction of an expensive desalination plant that many claimed was unnecessary. Other issues included health, education, and law and order. Ted Baillieu promised to restore the budget to surplus, employ more nurses and police, make Victorian teachers the highest paid in the country, and abolish suspended sentences which were seen as out of touch with community standards.

In 2009 and 2010, Melbourne saw a wave of street violence targeting international Indian students. While the incumbent Labor government was criticized for downplaying the racial element of the attacks, Baillieu broke ranks to fiercely condemn the "fear and terror" the students faced. He actively advocated for their safety and safety on public transport, which built immense trust and goodwill of Victorian Indian community.

== Background ==
At the 1999 election, the Labor Party led by Steve Bracks was able to form a minority government with the parliamentary support of 3 Independents, displacing the incumbent Jeff Kennett Liberal/National Coalition government. Labor was returned with a majority government after a landslide win at the 2002 election. Labor was elected for a third term at the 2006 election with a substantial but reduced majority. Labor won 55 of the 88 seats, a decrease of 7, and 54.4% of the two-party preferred vote, a decrease of 3.4%. Brumby replaced Bracks as Labor leader and Premier of Victoria in 2007.

=== Political changes ===
The previous elections took place on Saturday, 25 November 2006. At the 2006 election, the Labor Party won 55 of the 88 seats, the Liberal Party won 23, the National Party won 9, and there was 1 Independent. Since that date a number of political changes took place.

Both Premier Bracks and Deputy Premier John Thwaites resigned on 27 July 2007.

=== By-elections ===
Between the 2006 and 2010 elections, four by-elections took place. In Bracks' seat of Williamstown and Thwaites' seat of Albert Park in 2007, former minister Andre Haermeyer's seat of Kororoit in 2008, and former minister Lynne Kosky's seat of Altona in 2010. All four seats were retained by Labor. Labor MP Craig Langdon resigned from his seat of Ivanhoe in August 2010, however the by-election writ was discharged by the Parliamentary Speaker due to the proximity of the state election coupled with the cost of holding a by-election.

== Retiring MPs ==
=== Labor ===
- Peter Batchelor MLA (Thomastown)
- Bob Cameron MLA (Bendigo West)
- Carlo Carli MLA (Brunswick)
- Judy Maddigan MLA (Essendon)
- Karen Overington MLA (Ballarat West)
- George Seitz MLA (Keilor)

=== Liberal ===
- Helen Shardey MLA (Caulfield)
- John Vogels MLC (Western Victoria Region)

=== National ===
- Ken Jasper MLA (Murray Valley)

== Results ==
=== Legislative Assembly ===
Government (45) Coalition Liberal (35) National (10) Opposition (43) Labor (43)

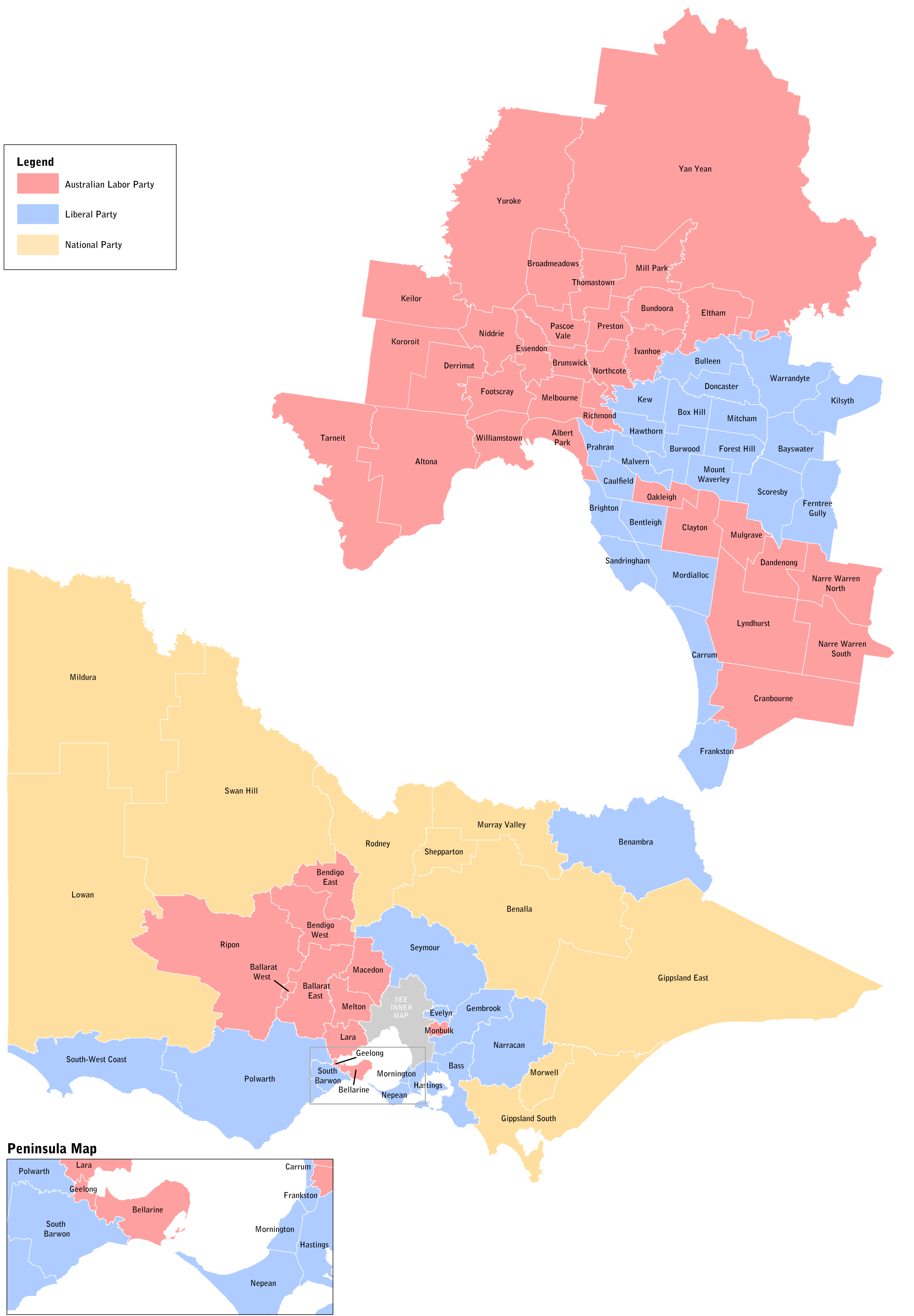
Lower house seat outcome of the Victorian 2010 election

Legislative Assembly (IRV) – (CV)
Party	Votes	%	Swing	Seats	Change
Liberal	1,203,654	38.03	▲3.59	35	▲12
National	213,492	6.75	▲1.58	10	▲1
Coalition total	1,417,146	44.78	▲5.17	45	▲13
Labor	1,147,348	36.25	▼6.81	43	▼12
Greens	354,697	11.21	▲1.17	0	Steady
Independents	82,395	2.60	▲0.31	0	▼1
Family First	72,354	2.29	▼2.00	0	Steady
Country Alliance	42,938	1.36	New	0	Steady
Democratic Labour	28,176	0.89	New	0	Steady
Sex Party	17,252	0.55	New	0	Steady
Socialist Alliance	1,787	0.06	▲0.02	0	Steady
Christian Democrats	636	0.02	New	0	Steady
Total valid votes	3,164,729	95.04	▼0.40	–	–
Invalid/blank votes	165,134	4.96	▲0.40	–	–
Total	3,329,863	100	–	88	Steady
Registered voters / Turnout	3,582,232	92.95	▲0.23	–	–
Two-party-preferred vote
Coalition	1,633,312	51.58	+5.97	45	▲13
Labor	1,533,225	48.42	−5.97	43	▼12

Labor suffered a swing of 5.97 percent, a larger swing than the 1992 landslide that brought the Jeff Kennett-led Coalition to power. However, much of that swing was wasted on landslide victories in the Coalition's heartland. As a result, the Coalition only just managed the 13-seat swing it needed to make Baillieu premier, netting it a bare majority of two seats.

On 29 November, with the result beyond doubt, Brumby conceded defeat. He resigned as state Labor leader the next day. The new Liberal/National government was sworn in on 2 December 2010, and former Health Minister Daniel Andrews was elected Labor leader on 3 December.

=== Legislative Council ===
Party	Votes	%	+/–	Seats	+/–
Labor	1,137,461	35.36	▼6.09	16	▼3
Liberal (metropolitan)	792,702	24.65	▲3.35	12	▲3
Liberal/National (joint ticket)	595,330	18.51	▲0.83	–	–
Liberal (country)				6	Steady
National				3	▲1
Greens	386,172	12.01	▲1.43	3	Steady
Family First	91,982	2.86	▼0.99	0	Steady
Democratic Labour	75,080	2.33	▲0.36	0	▼1
Sex Party	61,542	1.91	New	0	New
Country Alliance	53,149	1.65	▲1.20	0	Steady
Christian Democrats	12,322	0.38	▲0.18	0	Steady
Independents	10,646	0.33		0	Steady
Total	3,216,386	100.00	–	40	–
Valid votes	3,216,386	96.62			
Invalid/blank votes	112,475	3.38	▼0.91		
Total votes	3,328,861	100.00	–		
Registered voters/turnout	3,582,232	92.93	▲0.20		

Legislative Council seats

Legislative Council Region	Seats held
Eastern Metropolitan Region	
Eastern Victoria Region	
Northern Metropolitan Region	
Northern Victoria Region	
South Eastern Metropolitan Region	
Southern Metropolitan Region	
Western Metropolitan Region	
Western Victoria Region	

Liberal
National
Labor
Green

In the 40-member upper house where all members are up for re-election every term, the Coalition won a majority of 21 seats, with 16 seats won by Labor and 3 won by the Greens.

== Seats changing hands ==
Seat	Pre-2010			Swing	Post-2010		
Seat	Party	Member	Margin	Swing	Margin	Member	Party
Bentleigh	Labor	Rob Hudson	6.3	-7.1	0.8	Elizabeth Miller	Liberal
Burwood	Labor	Bob Stensholt	3.7	-9.6	5.9	Graham Watt	Liberal
Carrum	Labor	Jenny Lindell	6.7	-8.7	2.0	Donna Bauer	Liberal
Forest Hill	Labor	Kirstie Marshall	0.8	-3.9	3.2	Neil Angus	Liberal
Frankston	Labor	Alistair Harkness	3.2	-5.3	2.1	Geoff Shaw	Liberal
Gembrook	Labor	Tammy Lobato	0.7	-7.5	6.8	Brad Battin	Liberal
Gippsland East ^{¶}	Independent	Craig Ingram	9.1	-21.1	12.0	Tim Bull	National
Mitcham	Labor	Tony Robinson	2.0	-4.7	2.8	Dee Ryall	Liberal
Mordialloc	Labor	Janice Munt	3.5	-5.6	2.1	Lorraine Wreford	Liberal
Mount Waverley	Labor	Maxine Morand	0.3	-7.8	7.4	Michael Gidley	Liberal
Prahran	Labor	Tony Lupton	3.6	-7.8	4.3	Clem Newton-Brown	Liberal
Seymour	Labor	Ben Hardman	6.7	-7.9	1.2	Cindy McLeish	Liberal
South Barwon	Labor	Michael Crutchfield	4.1	-6.2	3.9	Andrew Katos	Liberal

^{¶} In 2006, the final Gippsland East 2PP count included Independent and Liberal, however in 2010 the final 2PP count included Independent and Nationals

== Key dates ==
Terms are fixed at four years. Elections occur in line with the fixed term provisions laid out in the Electoral Act 2002.

Key dates for the election were:

- 2 November: Dissolution of Parliament and lodgement of election writs
- 9 November: Close of rolls
- 11 November: Close of nominations for party candidates
- 12 November: Close of nominations for independents
- 15 November: Early voting commences
- 25 November: Close of postal voting
- 26 November: Early voting closes
- 27 November: Election day (polls open 8am to 6pm)

== Opinion polling ==
Polling conducted by Newspoll and published in The Australian is performed via random telephone number selection in city and country areas. Sampling sizes usually consist of over 1000 electors, with the declared margin of error at ±3 percent.

Local regression of primary vote opinion polling for the 2010 Victorian state election

Better Premier ratings^
	Labor Brumby	Liberal Baillieu
2010 election	–	–
23 – 25 Nov 2010	48%	38%
9 – 11 Nov 2010	50%	36%
Sep – Oct 2010	49%	31%
Jul – Aug 2010	52%	27%
May – Jun 2010	47%	31%
Mar – Apr 2010	49%	29%
Jan – Feb 2010	51%	29%
Nov – Dec 2009	54%	26%
Sep – Oct 2009	52%	27%
Jul – Aug 2009	52%	27%
May – Jun 2009	54%	21%
Jan – Feb 2009	54%	22%
Nov – Dec 2008	49%	27%
Sep – Oct 2008	45%	27%
Jul – Aug 2008	48%	26%
May – Jun 2008	51%	28%
Mar – Apr 2008	49%	23%
Jan – Feb 2008	48%	25%
Nov – Dec 2007	51%	22%
Sep – Oct 2007	51%	25%
2006 election	–	–
22 – 23 Nov 2006	53%^{1}	30%
Polling conducted by Newspoll and published in The Australian.^{1} Steve Bracks.^ Remainder were "uncommitted" to either leader.

Legislative Assembly (lower house) opinion polling
	Primary vote					2PP vote
	ALP	LIB	NAT	GRN	OTH	ALP	L/NP
2010 election	36.3%	38.0%	6.7%	11.2%	7.8%	48.4%	51.6%
23 – 25 Nov 2010	33%	40%	5%	15%	7%	48.9%	51.1%
9 – 11 Nov 2010	37%	39%	5%	14%	5%	51%	49%
Sep – Oct 2010	35%	36%	4%	19%	6%	52%	48%
Jul – Aug 2010	38%	32%	4%	17%	9%	55%	45%
May – Jun 2010	34%	36%	4%	18%	8%	51%	49%
Mar – Apr 2010	37%	38%	3%	14%	8%	52%	48%
Jan – Feb 2010	39%	36%	3%	14%	8%	54%	46%
Nov – Dec 2009	41%	32%	3%	14%	10%	57%	43%
Sep – Oct 2009	43%	32%	3%	15%	7%	57%	43%
Jul – Aug 2009	43%	35%	2%	12%	8%	56%	44%
May – Jun 2009	42%	34%	3%	14%	7%	56%	44%
Jan – Feb 2009	46%	31%	2%	15%	6%	60%	40%
Nov – Dec 2008	45%	34%	3%	13%	5%	57%	43%
Sep – Oct 2008	37%	37%	4%	15%	7%	51%	49%
Jul – Aug 2008	41%	34%	4%	12%	9%	54%	46%
May – Jun 2008	41%	35%	3%	14%	7%	55%	45%
Mar – Apr 2008	44%	33%	3%	12%	8%	58%	42%
Jan – Feb 2008	43%	34%	3%	12%	8%	56%	44%
Nov – Dec 2007	51%	31%	3%	9%	6%	60%	40%
Sep – Oct 2007	49%	36%	4%	6%	5%	56%	44%
2006 election	43.1%	34.4%	5.2%	10.0%	7.3%	54.4%	45.6%
22 – 23 Nov 2006	45%	32%	5%	9%	9%	56%	44%
Polling conducted by Newspoll and published in The Australian.

Sky News exit polls in marginal seats recorded a Coalition 54-46 Labor result.

== Newspaper endorsements ==
Dailies		Sundays	
Newspaper	Endorsement	Newspaper	Endorsement
The Age	Labor	The Sunday Age	Labor
The Australian	Labor	The Weekend Australian	
The Australian Financial Review	Labor		
Herald Sun	Labor	Sunday Herald Sun	Labor
