= Electoral results for the district of Tarneit =

Victoria, Australia, district election results

This is a list of electoral results for the Electoral district of Tarneit in Victorian state elections.

== Members for Tarneit ==
Member	Party	Term
Mary Gillett	Labor	2002–2006
Tim Pallas	Labor	2006–2014
Telmo Languiller	Labor	2014–2018
Sarah Connolly	Labor	2018–2022
Dylan Wight	Labor	2022–present

== Election results ==
=== Elections in the 2020s ===
2022 Victorian state election: Tarneit
Party	Candidate	Votes	%	±%
Labor	Dylan Wight	18,173	46.6	−9.8
Liberal	Preet Singh	10,438	26.8	+0.9
Greens	Clare Miller	2,883	7.4	−0.3
Victorian Socialists	Claudio Uribe	2,072	5.3	+5.3
Family First	Thomas Jeffrey	1,977	5.1	+5.1
New Democrats	Jaydeep Patel	1,176	3.0	+3.0
Freedom	Erum Maqsood	882	2.3	+2.3
Animal Justice	Maurita Rahn	843	2.2	+2.2
Ind. (United People's)	Aijaz Moinuddin	534	1.4	+1.4
Total formal votes		38,977	93.0	+0.2
Informal votes		2,947	7.0	−0.2
Turnout		41,924	85.9	+0.4
Two-party-preferred result
Labor	Dylan Wight	24,276	62.3	−5.6
Liberal	Preet Singh	14,701	37.7	+5.6
Labor hold		Swing	−5.6	

=== Elections in the 2010s ===
2018 Victorian state election: Tarneit
Party	Candidate	Votes	%	±%
Labor	Sarah Connolly	25,084	56.20	+9.40
Liberal	Glenn Goodfellow	11,460	25.67	−0.72
Greens	Beck Sheffield-Brotherton	3,398	7.61	−1.40
Independent	Arnav Sati	1,740	3.90	+3.90
Independent	Harkamal Batth	1,145	2.57	+2.57
Independent	Aaron An	1,006	2.25	+2.25
Independent	Zulfi Syed	802	1.80	+1.80
Total formal votes		44,635	92.86	+0.94
Informal votes		3,432	7.14	−0.94
Turnout		48,067	89.21	−3.03
Two-party-preferred result
Labor	Sarah Connolly	30,525	68.02	+3.44
Liberal	Glenn Goodfellow	14,350	31.98	−3.44
Labor hold		Swing	+3.44	

2014 Victorian state election: Tarneit
Party	Candidate	Votes	%	±%
Labor	Telmo Languiller	17,446	46.8	−4.0
Liberal	Dinesh Gourisetty	9,839	26.4	−5.1
Greens	Rohan Waring	3,360	9.0	+0.1
Christians	Lem Baguot	1,603	4.3	+4.3
Voice for the West	Abdul Mujeeb Syed	1,106	3.0	+3.0
Independent	Joh Bauch	1,083	2.9	+2.9
Family First	Seelan Govender	931	2.5	−2.3
Independent	Safwat Ali	764	2.1	+2.0
Rise Up Australia	Clement Francis	657	1.8	+1.8
Independent	Chin Loi	491	1.3	+1.3
Total formal votes		37,280	91.9	−2.7
Informal votes		3,276	8.1	+2.7
Turnout		40,556	92.2	+13.1
Two-party-preferred result
Labor	Telmo Languiller	24,139	64.6	+3.5
Liberal	Dinesh Gourisetty	13,239	35.4	−3.5
Labor hold		Swing	+3.5	

2010 Victorian state election: Tarneit
Party	Candidate	Votes	%	±%
Labor	Tim Pallas	20,521	49.08	−4.32
Liberal	Glenn Goodfellow	13,458	32.19	+4.64
Greens	Bro Sheffield-Brotherton	3,716	8.89	+2.51
Family First	Lori McLean	2,128	5.09	−1.29
Democratic Labor	Michael Freeman	1,988	4.75	+4.75
Total formal votes		41,811	94.38	−0.31
Informal votes		2,492	5.62	+0.31
Turnout		44,303	92.72	−1.11
Two-party-preferred result
Labor	Tim Pallas	25,553	61.13	−1.34
Liberal	Glenn Goodfellow	16,248	38.87	+1.34
Labor hold		Swing	−1.34	

=== Elections in the 2000s ===
2006 Victorian state election: Tarneit
Party	Candidate	Votes	%	±%
Labor	Tim Pallas	19,565	53.4	−10.1
Liberal	Mark Rose	10,094	27.6	−0.5
Family First	Chris Harrison	2,339	6.4	+6.4
Greens	Pamela Boyd	2,336	6.4	+6.4
Independent	John Gibbons	1,726	4.7	+4.7
People Power	Michael Goldsworthy	576	1.6	+1.6
Total formal votes		36,636	94.7	−1.6
Informal votes		2,053	5.3	+1.6
Turnout		38,689	93.8	
Two-party-preferred result
Labor	Tim Pallas	22,879	62.5	−4.9
Liberal	Mark Rose	13,747	37.5	+4.9
Labor hold		Swing	−4.9	

2002 Victorian state election: Tarneit
Party	Candidate	Votes	%	±%
Labor	Mary Gillett	21,246	63.5	+5.2
Liberal	James Hanrahan	9,382	28.1	−9.8
Independent	Christine Hudson	2,811	8.4	+8.4
Total formal votes		33,439	96.3	−0.5
Informal votes		1,270	3.7	+0.5
Turnout		34,709	93.5	
Two-party-preferred result
Labor	Mary Gillett	22,538	67.4	+6.8
Liberal	James Hanrahan	10,901	32.6	−6.8
Labor hold		Swing	+6.8	
