= Post-election pendulum for the 2006 Victorian state election =

The following is a Mackerras pendulum for the 2006 Victorian state election.

"Very safe" seats require a swing of over 20 per cent to change, "safe" seats require a swing of 10 to 20 per cent to change, "fairly safe" seats require a swing of between 6 and 10 per cent, while "marginal" seats require a swing of less than 6 per cent.

Labor seats
Marginal
Mount Waverley	Maxine Morand	ALP	0.3%
Gembrook	Tammy Lobato	ALP	0.7%
Forest Hill	Kirstie Marshall	ALP	0.8%
Melbourne	Bronwyn Pike	ALP v GRN	1.9%
Mitcham	Tony Robinson	ALP	2.0%
South Barwon	Michael Crutchfield	ALP	2.3%
Frankston	Alistair Harkness	ALP	3.2%
Mordialloc	Janice Munt	ALP	3.5%
Brunswick	Carlo Carli	ALP v GRN	3.6%
Prahran	Tony Lupton	ALP	3.6%
Richmond	Richard Wynne	ALP v GRN	3.6%
Burwood	Bob Stensholt	ALP	3.7%
Ripon	Joe Helper	ALP	4.3%
Bendigo East	Jacinta Allan	ALP	5.4%
Fairly safe
Bentleigh	Rob Hudson	ALP	6.3%
Ballarat West	Karen Overington	ALP	6.5%
Eltham	Steve Herbert	ALP	6.5%
Ballarat East	Geoff Howard	ALP	6.6%
Carrum	Jenny Lindell	ALP	6.7%
Monbulk	James Merlino	ALP	6.7%
Seymour	Ben Hardman	ALP	6.7%
Bellarine	Lisa Neville	ALP	7.9%
Yan Yean	Danielle Green	ALP	7.9%
Altona	Jill Hennessy	ALP	7.9%
Macedon	Joanne Duncan	ALP	8.2%
Geelong	Ian Trezise	ALP	8.3%
Northcote	Fiona Richardson	ALP v GRN	8.5%
Narre Warren North	Luke Donnellan	ALP	9.2%
Albert Park	Martin Foley	ALP	9.5%
Safe
Ivanhoe	Craig Langdon	ALP	10.4%
Bendigo West	Bob Cameron	ALP	10.6%
Narre Warren South	Judith Graley	ALP	10.9%
Niddrie	Rob Hulls	ALP	11.2%
Cranbourne	Jude Perera	ALP	11.3%
Essendon	Judy Maddigan	ALP	11.7%
Oakleigh	Ann Barker	ALP	12.4%
Tarneit	Tim Pallas	ALP	12.5%
Melton	Don Nardella	ALP	13.5%
Bundoora	Colin Brooks	ALP	15.1%
Mulgrave	Daniel Andrews	ALP	15.8%
Lara	John Eren	ALP	17.9%
Dandenong	John Pandazopoulos	ALP	18.7%
Keilor	George Seitz	ALP	19.4%
Very safe
Yuroke	Liz Beattie	ALP	20.2%
Clayton	Hong Lim	ALP	20.3%
Mill Park	Lily D'Ambrosio	ALP	20.8%
Lyndhurst	Tim Holding	ALP	21.5%
Pascoe Vale	Christine Campbell	ALP	22.8%
Derrimut	Telmo Languiller	ALP	24.3%
Williamstown	Wade Noonan	ALP	24.3%
Footscray	Bruce Mildenhall	ALP	24.7%
Preston	Robin Scott	ALP	25.3%
Kororoit	Marlene Kairouz	ALP	25.6%
Thomastown	Peter Batchelor	ALP	31.1%
Broadmeadows	John Brumby	ALP	31.9%

Liberal/National seats
Marginal
Ferntree Gully	Nick Wakeling	LIB	0.04%
Kilsyth	David Hodgett	LIB	0.4%
Hastings	Neale Burgess	LIB	1.0%
Morwell	Russell Northe	NAT	2.2%
Narracan	Gary Blackwood	LIB	2.7%
Evelyn	Christine Fyffe	LIB	2.8%
Bayswater	Heidi Victoria	LIB	2.9%
South-West Coast	Denis Napthine	LIB	4.0%
Box Hill	Robert Clark	LIB	5.2%
Bass	Ken Smith	LIB	5.5%
Fairly safe
Caulfield	Helen Shardey	LIB	7.6%
Benambra	Bill Tilley	LIB	7.7%
Doncaster	Mary Wooldridge	LIB	8.1%
Bulleen	Nicholas Kotsiras	LIB	8.4%
Sandringham	Murray Thompson	LIB	8.7%
Warrandyte	Ryan Smith	LIB	9.0%
Nepean	Martin Dixon	LIB	9.4%
Kew	Andrew McIntosh	LIB	9.6%
Safe
Polwarth	Terry Mulder	LIB	10.7%
Brighton	Louise Asher	LIB	10.9%
Scoresby	Kim Wells	LIB	11.2%
Malvern	Michael O'Brien	LIB	11.3%
Mornington	David Morris	LIB	11.9%
Hawthorn	Ted Baillieu	LIB	12.3%
Gippsland South	Peter Ryan	NAT	15.8%
Benalla	Bill Sykes	NAT	17.5%
Very safe
Mildura	Peter Crisp	NAT	20.7%
Murray Valley	Ken Jasper	NAT	21.8%
Lowan	Hugh Delahunty	NAT	22.1%
Swan Hill	Peter Walsh	NAT	23.4%
Shepparton	Jeanette Powell	NAT	24.7%
Rodney	Paul Weller	NAT	24.8%
Independents
Gippsland East	Craig Ingram	IND v LIB	9.1%
