= Electoral results for the district of Mordialloc =

Victoria, Australia, district election results

This is a list of electoral results for the Electoral district of Mordialloc in Victorian state elections.

== Members for Mordialloc ==
Member	Party	Term
Geoff Leigh	Liberal	1992–2002
Janice Munt	Labor	2002–2010
Lorraine Wreford	Liberal	2010–2014
Tim Richardson	Labor	2014–present

== Election results ==
=== Elections in the 2020s ===
2022 Victorian state election: Mordialloc
Party	Candidate	Votes	%	±%
Labor	Tim Richardson	19,398	44.0	−6.8
Liberal	Phillip Pease	13,829	31.4	+0.4
Greens	Daniel Lessa	4,526	10.3	+2.7
Independent	Sarah O'Donnell	3,240	7.4	+7.4
Animal Justice	Chi Vo	1,070	2.4	−0.7
Freedom	Deborah Albrecht	955	2.2	+2.2
Family First	Patrick Lum	887	2.0	+2.0
Independent	Phil Reid	154	0.3	−0.12
Total formal votes		44,059	95.6	+1.6
Informal votes		2,035	4.4	−1.6
Turnout		46,094	91.0	−10.9
Two-party-preferred result
Labor	Tim Richardson	25,640	58.2	−5.2
Liberal	Phillip Pease	18,419	41.8	+5.2
Labor hold		Swing	−5.2	

=== Elections in the 2010s ===
2018 Victorian state election: Mordialloc
Party	Candidate	Votes	%	±%
Labor	Tim Richardson	19,991	50.15	+11.46
Liberal	Geoff Gledhill	12,535	31.45	−12.37
Greens	Hamish Taylor	3,135	7.87	−0.04
Animal Justice	Bronwyn Currie	1,117	2.80	+2.80
Justice	Peter Sullivan	1,102	2.76	+2.76
Independent	Robyn Nolan	859	2.16	+2.16
Democratic Labour	Peter Phillips	643	1.61	−0.67
Transport Matters	Amit Verma	221	0.55	+0.55
Independent	Phil Reid	167	0.42	+0.42
Independent	Stephen Watson	89	0.22	+0.22
Total formal votes		39,859	93.93	+0.38
Informal votes		2,574	6.07	−0.38
Turnout		42,433	92.16	−1.85
Two-party-preferred result
Labor	Tim Richardson	25,159	62.90	+10.87
Liberal	Geoff Gledhill	14,838	37.10	−10.87
Labor hold		Swing	+10.87	

2014 Victorian state election: Mordialloc
Party	Candidate	Votes	%	±%
Liberal	Lorraine Wreford	16,807	43.8	−2.2
Labor	Tim Richardson	14,840	38.7	+0.6
Greens	Alexander Breskin	3,031	7.9	−2.1
Democratic Labour	Damien Brick	877	2.3	+0.4
Sex Party	Tristram Chellew	737	1.9	+0.8
Independent	Rosemary West	715	1.9	+1.9
Family First	Jeevaloshni Govender	379	1.0	−0.8
Independent	Leon Pompei	371	1.0	+1.0
Independent	Georgina Oxley	301	0.8	+0.8
Rise Up Australia	Rod Figueroa	193	0.5	+0.5
Independent	Victoria Oxley	103	0.3	+0.3
Total formal votes		38,354	93.6	−1.3
Informal votes		2,641	6.4	+1.3
Turnout		40,995	94.0	−1.7
Two-party-preferred result
Labor	Tim Richardson	19,981	52.1	+3.6
Liberal	Lorraine Wreford	18,373	47.9	−3.6
Labor gain from Liberal		Swing	+3.6	

2010 Victorian state election: Mordialloc
Party	Candidate	Votes	%	±%
Liberal	Lorraine Wreford	17,223	46.86	+6.11
Labor	Janice Munt	13,778	37.49	−7.85
Greens	Camellia Feteiha	3,443	9.37	−0.66
Sex Party	Tom Killen	764	2.08	+2.08
Family First	Stephen Nowland	552	1.50	−2.38
Democratic Labor	James Leach	514	1.40	+1.40
Independent	Michael Carty	225	0.61	+0.61
Independent	Brandon Hoult	152	0.41	+0.41
Independent	Frank Denvir	102	0.28	+0.28
Total formal votes		36,753	93.95	−2.03
Informal votes		2,368	6.05	+2.03
Turnout		39,121	93.84	+0.01
Two-party-preferred result
Liberal	Lorraine Wreford	19,197	51.96	+5.58
Labor	Janice Munt	17,746	48.04	−5.58
Liberal gain from Labor		Swing	+5.58	

=== Elections in the 2000s ===
2006 Victorian state election: Mordialloc
Party	Candidate	Votes	%	±%
Labor	Janice Munt	16,026	45.3	−0.8
Liberal	Stephen Hartney	14,405	40.8	−2.0
Greens	Shana Nerenberg	3,544	10.0	−0.1
Family First	Jadah Milroy	1,371	3.9	+3.9
Total formal votes		35,346	96.0	−1.1
Informal votes		1,480	4.0	+1.1
Turnout		36,826	93.8	
Two-party-preferred result
Labor	Janice Munt	18,926	53.5	−1.0
Liberal	Stephen Hartney	16,420	46.5	+1.0
Labor hold		Swing	−1.0	

2002 Victorian state election: Mordialloc
Party	Candidate	Votes	%	±%
Labor	Janice Munt	15,832	46.1	−0.9
Liberal	Geoff Leigh	14,676	42.8	−9.5
Greens	Shaun Monagle	3,463	10.1	+9.4
Citizens Electoral Council	Frank Gigliotti	356	1.0	+1.0
Total formal votes		34,327	97.1	−0.0
Informal votes		1,034	2.9	+0.0
Turnout		35,361	94.0	
Two-party-preferred result
Labor	Janice Munt	18,717	54.5	+7.0
Liberal	Geoff Leigh	15,610	45.5	−7.0
Labor gain from Liberal		Swing	+7.0	

=== Elections in the 1990s ===
1999 Victorian state election: Mordialloc
Party	Candidate	Votes	%	±%
Liberal	Geoff Leigh	15,515	52.2	−1.2
Labor	Robyn McLeod	14,200	47.8	+5.8
Total formal votes		29,715	96.9	−1.2
Informal votes		955	3.1	+1.2
Turnout		30,670	93.4	
Liberal hold		Swing	−2.5	

1996 Victorian state election: Mordialloc
Party	Candidate	Votes	%	±%
Liberal	Geoff Leigh	15,951	53.4	−0.9
Labor	Robyn McLeod	12,552	42.0	+3.2
Independent	Frank Denvir	1,377	4.6	+4.6
Total formal votes		29,880	98.1	+1.7
Informal votes		590	1.9	−1.7
Turnout		30,470	94.5	
Two-party-preferred result
Liberal	Geoff Leigh	16,326	54.7	−2.6
Labor	Robyn McLeod	13,524	45.3	+2.6
Liberal hold		Swing	−2.6	

1992 Victorian state election: Mordialloc
Party	Candidate	Votes	%	±%
Liberal	Geoff Leigh	15,828	54.3	+9.1
Labor	Peter Spyker	11,308	38.8	−10.3
Independent	Declan Stephenson	1,157	4.0	+4.0
Independent	Klara Mitchell	876	3.0	+3.0
Total formal votes		29,169	96.4	−0.1
Informal votes		1,093	3.6	+0.1
Turnout		30,262	95.2	
Two-party-preferred result
Liberal	Geoff Leigh	16,696	57.3	+9.5
Labor	Peter Spyker	12,418	42.7	−9.5
Liberal gain from Labor		Swing	+9.5	
