= Electoral results for the district of Melton =

Victoria, Australia, district election results

This is a list of electoral results for the Electoral district of Melton in Victorian state elections.

== Members for Melton ==
Member	Party	Term
David Cunningham	Labor	1992–1999
Don Nardella	Labor	1999–2017
Don Nardella	Independent	2017–2018
Steve McGhie	Labor	2018–present

== Election results ==
=== Elections in the 2020s ===
2022 Victorian state election: Melton
Party	Candidate	Votes	%	±%
Labor	Steve McGhie	14,193	37.7	+3.3
Liberal	Graham Watt	9,155	24.3	+7.9
Independent	Ian Birchall	3,403	9.1	−4.2
Independent	Jarrod James Bingham	2,186	5.8	+0.8
Greens	Praise Morris	1,711	4.6	0.0
Shooters, Fishers, Farmers	Paul Blackborrow	1,682	4.5	+4.5
Democratic Labour	Ashley Alp	1,629	4.3	+1.5
Family First	Richard Brunt	946	2.5	+2.5
Animal Justice	Fiona Adin-James	743	2.0	−0.8
Freedom	Tony Dobran	717	1.9	+1.9
Justice	Samantha Jane Donald	663	1.8	+1.8
New Democrats	Jasleen Kaur	242	0.6	+0.6
Health Australia	Lucienne Ciappara	219	0.6	+0.6
Independent	Jason Spencer Perera	130	0.3	+0.3
Total formal votes		37,619	88.9	–1.1
Informal votes		4,716	11.1	+1.1
Turnout		42,335	84.4	+7.2
Two-party-preferred result
Labor	Steve McGhie	20,538	54.6	−0.4
Liberal	Graham Watt	17,081	45.4	+0.4
Labor hold		Swing	−0.4	

=== Elections in the 2010s ===
2018 Victorian state election: Melton
Party	Candidate	Votes	%	±%
Labor	Steve McGhie	14,691	34.93	−15.52
Liberal	Ryan Farrow	7,844	18.65	−12.20
Independent	Ian Birchall	4,402	10.47	+10.47
Independent	Bob Turner	4,108	9.77	+9.77
Independent	Jarrod Bingham	2,842	6.76	+6.76
Independent	Sophie Ramsey	2,260	5.37	+5.37
Greens	Harkirat Singh	1,980	4.71	−2.56
Animal Justice	Tania Milton	1,185	2.82	+2.82
Democratic Labour	Victor Bennett	1,166	2.77	+2.77
Independent	Daryl Lang	878	2.09	+2.09
Independent	Grant Stirling	424	1.01	+1.01
Victorian Socialists	Ron Guy	275	0.65	+0.65
Total formal votes		42,055	89.94	−1.93
Informal votes		4,704	10.06	+1.93
Turnout		46,759	87.72	−4.84
Two-party-preferred result
Labor	Steve McGhie	22,830	54.29	−6.93
Liberal	Ryan Farrow	19,225	45.71	+6.93
Labor hold		Swing	−6.93	

2014 Victorian state election: Melton
Party	Candidate	Votes	%	±%
Labor	Don Nardella	19,272	50.5	+0.4
Liberal	Daryl Lang	11,783	30.8	+0.9
Greens	Marie-Anne Cooper	2,777	7.3	−1.5
Voice for the West	Monika Thomas	1,544	4.0	+4.0
Independent	Matt DeLeon	1,392	3.6	+0.2
Christians	Mabor Chaudhuol	532	1.4	+1.4
Country Alliance	Sav Mangion	443	1.2	−1.3
Independent	Victor Bennett	338	0.9	+0.9
Independent	Mohamad Aljofan	114	0.3	+0.3
Total formal votes		38,195	91.9	−0.9
Informal votes		3,379	8.1	+0.9
Turnout		41,574	92.6	+4.0
Two-party-preferred result
Labor	Don Nardella	23,495	61.2	−2.4
Liberal	Daryl Lang	14,885	38.8	+2.4
Labor hold		Swing	−2.4	

2010 Victorian state election: Melton
Party	Candidate	Votes	%	±%
Labor	Don Nardella	18,520	49.44	−5.00
Liberal	Braidy Kean	11,615	31.01	+3.17
Greens	Katrina Bradfield	3,247	8.67	+2.24
Family First	Samir Sabeh	1,431	3.82	−2.80
Independent	Matt DeLeon	1,260	3.36	+3.36
Country Alliance	Sav Mangion	893	2.38	+2.38
Socialist Alliance	Ron Guy	494	1.32	+1.32
Total formal votes		37,460	92.75	−1.35
Informal votes		2,926	7.25	+1.35
Turnout		40,386	92.55	−0.49
Two-party-preferred result
Labor	Don Nardella	23,525	62.78	−0.76
Liberal	Braidy Kean	13,947	37.22	+0.76
Labor hold		Swing	−0.76	

=== Elections in the 2000s ===
2006 Victorian state election: Melton
Party	Candidate	Votes	%	±%
Labor	Don Nardella	18,442	54.4	−0.7
Liberal	Graham Hooper	9,430	27.8	+2.9
Family First	Pamela Lee	2,242	6.6	+6.6
Greens	Jeremy Sanders	2,177	6.4	−1.0
Independent	John Southall	856	2.5	+2.5
Independent	John Goodman	729	2.2	−1.0
Total formal votes		33,876	94.1	−1.4
Informal votes		2,123	5.9	+1.4
Turnout		35,999	93.0	
Two-party-preferred result
Labor	Don Nardella	21,513	63.5	−1.8
Liberal	Graham Hooper	12,345	36.5	+1.8
Labor hold		Swing	−1.8	

2002 Victorian state election: Melton
Party	Candidate	Votes	%	±%
Labor	Don Nardella	17,535	55.1	+0.7
Liberal	Richard Gough	7,919	24.9	−17.2
Greens	Ken Stewart	2,355	7.4	+6.9
Independent	John Hyett	2,199	6.9	+6.9
Independent	John Goodman	1,028	3.2	+3.2
Independent	Terry Muscat	669	2.1	+2.1
Independent	Frank McColl	111	0.3	+0.3
Total formal votes		31,816	95.5	−0.5
Informal votes		1,495	4.5	+0.5
Turnout		33,311	93.9	
Two-party-preferred result
Labor	Don Nardella	20,764	65.3	+8.7
Liberal	Richard Gough	11,022	34.7	−8.7
Labor hold		Swing	+8.7	

=== Elections in the 1990s ===
1999 Victorian state election: Melton
Party	Candidate	Votes	%	±%
Labor	Don Nardella	24,237	61.3	−0.8
Liberal	John McGeary	15,294	38.7	+0.8
Total formal votes		39,531	95.5	−1.2
Informal votes		1,862	4.5	+1.2
Turnout		41,393	94.0	
Labor hold		Swing	+0.8	

1996 Victorian state election: Melton
Party	Candidate	Votes	%	±%
Labor	David Cunningham	21,238	62.2	+9.1
Liberal	Margaret Wood	12,928	37.8	+2.3
Total formal votes		34,166	96.7	+1.5
Informal votes		1,178	3.3	−1.5
Turnout		35,344	93.6	
Labor hold		Swing	+2.2	

1992 Victorian state election: Melton
Party	Candidate	Votes	%	±%
Labor	David Cunningham	15,184	53.0	−3.7
Liberal	Therese Samson	10,159	35.5	+3.9
Independent	Peter Taylor	1,903	6.6	+6.6
Independent	David Toms	1,377	4.8	+4.8
Total formal votes		28,623	95.1	+0.2
Informal votes		1,462	4.9	−0.2
Turnout		30,085	95.3	
Two-party-preferred result
Labor	David Cunningham	16,883	60.0	−2.1
Liberal	Therese Samson	11,236	40.0	+2.1
Labor hold		Swing	−2.1	
