= Electoral results for the district of Laverton =

Electoral ward result

This is a list of electoral results for the Electoral district of Laverton in Victorian state elections.

== Members for Laverton ==
Member	Party	Term
Sarah Connolly	Labor	2022–present

== Election results ==
=== Elections in the 2020s ===
2022 Victorian state election: Laverton
Party	Candidate	Votes	%	±%
Labor	Sarah Connolly	17,026	45.9	−11.6
Liberal	Raja Reddy	8,233	22.2	+1.9
Greens	Braishna Durzada	3,496	9.4	−2.5
Victorian Socialists	Catherine Robertson	2,206	5.9	+5.9
Democratic Labour	Michael Wirth	2,051	5.5	+5.5
Family First	David Fry	1,353	3.6	+3.6
New Democrats	Gurneet Soni	1,082	2.9	+2.9
Animal Justice	Pouya Bagheri	694	1.9	−2.0
Freedom	Trent Raymond	641	1.7	+1.7
Independent	Rufo Paredes	355	1.0	+1.0
Total formal votes		37,132	92.2	−1.1
Informal votes		3,149	7.8	+1.1
Turnout		40,281	83.0	+5.8
Two-party-preferred result
Labor	Sarah Connolly	25,393	68.4	−5.0
Liberal	Raja Reddy	11,739	31.6	+5.0
Labor hold		Swing	−5.0	
