= Electoral results for the district of Greenvale =

Victoria, Australia, district election results

This is a list of electoral results for the Electoral district of Greenvale in Victorian state elections.

== Members for Greenvale ==
Member	Party	Term
Iwan Walters	Labor	2022–present

== Election results ==
=== Elections in the 2020s ===
2022 Victorian state election: Greenvale
Party	Candidate	Votes	%	±%
Labor	Iwan Walters	15,628	41.5	−18.6
Liberal	Usman Ghani	9,568	25.4	+1.1
Family First	Maria Bengtsson	2,778	7.4	+7.4
Victorian Socialists	Mutullah Can Yolbulan	2,582	6.9	+2.0
Independent	Fatma Erciyas	2,416	6.4	+6.4
Greens	Cristina Santa-Isabel	2,194	5.8	−1.1
Animal Justice	Rosanna Furina	1,295	3.4	+3.4
Freedom	Lauren Styles	1,225	3.2	+3.2
Total formal votes		37,686	91.9	−1.8
Informal votes		3,952	9.5	+1.8
Turnout		41,638	83.5	+3.2
Two-party-preferred result
Labor	Iwan Walters	21,506	57.1	−14.9
Liberal	Usman Ghani	16,180	42.9	+14.9
Labor hold		Swing	−14.9	
