= Electoral results for the district of Derrimut =

Australian district election results

This is a list of electoral results for the Electoral district of Derrimut in Victorian state elections.

== Members for Derrimut ==
First incarnation (1985–1992)
Member	Party	Term
David Cunningham	Labor	1985–1992
Second incarnation (2002–present)
Member	Party	Term
Telmo Languiller	Labor	2002–2014

== Election results ==
=== Elections in the 2010s ===
2010 Victorian state election: Derrimut
Party	Candidate	Votes	%	±%
Labor	Telmo Languiller	17,076	49.83	−13.61
Liberal	Wayne Tseng	7,971	23.26	+4.34
Greens	Geraldine Brooks	5,783	16.88	+8.89
Family First	Colin Moyle	2,001	5.84	−1.60
Democratic Labor	Michael Deverala	1,436	4.19	+4.19
Total formal votes		34,267	92.18	+0.69
Informal votes		2,906	7.89	−0.69
Turnout		37,173	91.01	−0.64
Two-party-preferred result
Labor	Telmo Languiller	22,123	64.35	−9.95
Liberal	Wayne Tseng	12,254	35.65	+9.95
Labor hold		Swing	−9.95	

=== Elections in the 2000s ===
2006 Victorian state election: Derrimut
Party	Candidate	Votes	%	±%
Labor	Telmo Languiller	19,103	63.44	−10.50
Liberal	Charles Tran	5,697	18.92	+1.59
Greens	Marc Purcell	2,407	7.99	+7.99
Family First	Margaret Forster	2,240	7.44	+7.44
Citizens Electoral Council	Rod Doel	368	1.22	−7.52
Independent	Jorge Jorquera	295	0.98	+0.98
Total formal votes		30,110	91.49	−1.50
Informal votes		2,799	8.51	+1.50
Turnout		32,909	91.65	+2.23
Two-party-preferred result
Labor	Telmo Languiller	22,365	74.30	−3.00
Liberal	Charles Tran	7,735	25.70	+3.00
Labor hold		Swing	−3.00	

2002 Victorian state election: Derrimut
Party	Candidate	Votes	%	±%
Labor	Telmo Languiller	21,278	73.9	+14.8
Liberal	Adrian Lim	4,987	17.3	−9.6
Citizens Electoral Council	Andrew Kozlowski	2,514	8.7	+8.7
Total formal votes		28,779	93.0	−1.3
Informal votes		2,169	7.0	+1.3
Turnout		30,948	89.4	
Two-party-preferred result
Labor	Telmo Languiller	22,245	77.3	+7.1
Liberal	Adrian Lim	6,533	22.7	−7.1
Labor hold		Swing	+7.1	

=== Elections in the 1980s ===
1988 Victorian state election: Derrimut
Party	Candidate	Votes	%	±%
Labor	David Cunningham	16,239	57.74	−7.88
Liberal	Helen Hurley	8,534	30.35	−4.03
Independent	Michael Newman	3,349	11.91	+11.91
Total formal votes		28,122	93.73	−2.66
Informal votes		1,880	6.27	+2.66
Turnout		30,002	93.01	−0.93
Two-party-preferred result
Labor	David Cunningham	17,759	63.27	−2.35
Liberal	Helen Hurley	10,310	36.73	+2.35
Labor hold		Swing	−2.35	

1985 Victorian state election: Derrimut
Party	Candidate	Votes	%	±%
Labor	David Cunningham	17,326	65.6	−3.3
Liberal	Helen Hurley	9,078	34.4	+9.2
Total formal votes		26,404	96.4	
Informal votes		989	3.6	
Turnout		27,393	93.9	
Labor hold		Swing	−8.1	
