= Gus Howell =

Australian rules footballer

Personal information
- Full name: Albert Victor Howell
- Born: 25 June 1897; Brighton East, Victoria
- Died: 19 January 1970 (aged 72); Parkdale, Victoria
- Original team: Brighton

Playing career^{1}
Years	Club	Games (Goals)
1919–20	Brighton (VFA)	13 (3)
1921	St Kilda	1 (0)
1926	Northcote (VFA)	1 (0)
1926	Footscray	6 (2)
- ^{1} Playing statistics correct to the end of 1926.

Albert Victor "Gus" Howell (25 June 1897 – 19 January 1970) was an Australian rules footballer who played with St Kilda and Footscray in the Victorian Football League (VFL).

== Family ==
The son of William Andrew Howell (1868–1948), and Mary Howell (1869–1939), née Marshall, Albert Victor Howell was born at Brighton East, Victoria on 25 June 1897.

He married Rita May Burrows (1907–1992) in 1928.

== Football ==
=== Footscray (VFL) ===
Cleared from Apollo Bay to Footscray on 30 April 1926.

== Death ==
He died at the Mordialloc and Cheltenham Community Hospital, in Parkdale, Victoria on 19 January 1970.
