= Mordialloc-Cheltenham Community Hospital =

Coordinates: 37.994984°S 145.083984°E

Geography
- Location: Parkdale, Victoria, Australia

Organisation
- Affiliated university: Southern Health Care Network

History
- Opened: 1953
- Closed: 1996

Links
- Lists: Hospitals in Australia

The Mordialloc-Cheltenham Community Hospital was a hospital in the suburb of Parkdale, Victoria, Australia.

Residents of the Cities of Mordialloc and Chelsea, Victoria worked towards a community hospital from the late 1930s. Having a community hospital meant residents who required routine surgery did not need to travel into Melbourne to the larger established hospitals. This was important at a time when few people had their own transport.

For many years the Mordialloc Carnival Committee contributed to the cost of building the hospital, with one of its contributions to the ‘opening day’ appeal amounting to one thousand pounds, adding to the several thousand already committed

Construction work commenced on the Mordialloc-Cheltenham Community Hospital in 1950. on a site between Booth St and Carrier Ave on the Nepean Highway in Parkdale.

The hospital opened in 1953 and serviced the community until 1996. On 1 August 1995, the hospital became a part of the Southern Health Care Network.

The former hospital site is now the main location of Central Bayside Community Health Services. and so is still associated with Community Health.
