= Attwood, Victoria =

Attwood
- Suburb
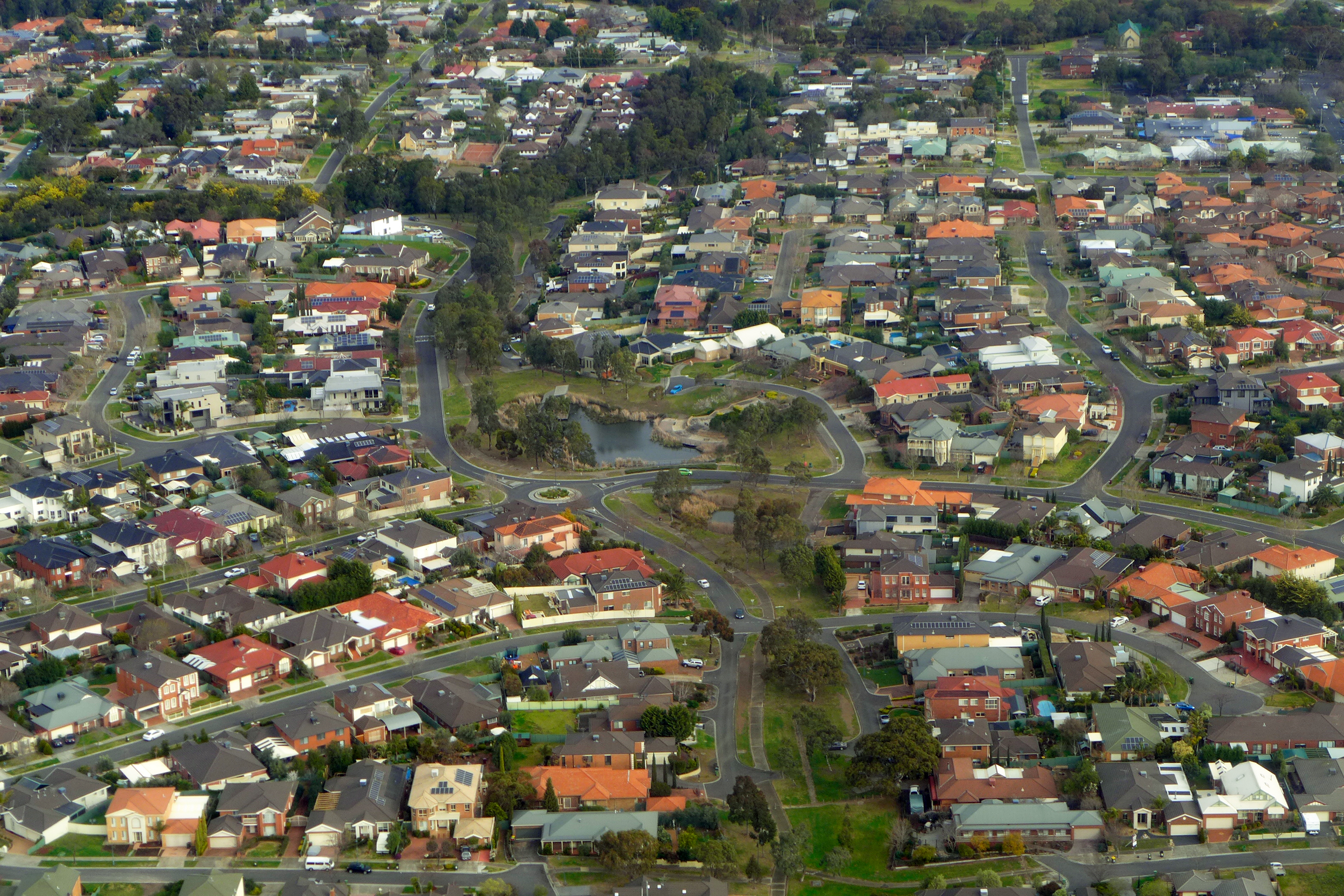
- Houses in Attwood, Victoria (2017)

- Interactive map of Attwood
- Coordinates: 37.666°S 144.887°E
- Country: Australia
- State: Victoria
- City: Melbourne
- LGA: City of Hume
- Location: 17 km (11 mi) NW of Melbourne; 3 km (1.9 mi) W of Broadmeadows

Government
  - State electorate: Greenvale
  - Federal division: Calwell

Area
  - Total: 2.5 km^{2} (0.97 sq mi)
- Elevation: 139 m (456 ft)

Population
  - Total: 3,309 (2021 census)
  - Density: 1,324/km^{2} (3,430/sq mi)
- Postcode: 3049
Suburbs around Attwood
Bulla; Greenvale	Greenvale	Greenvale; Meadow Heights
Greenvale	Attwood	Westmeadows
Melbourne Airport	Westmeadows	Westmeadows

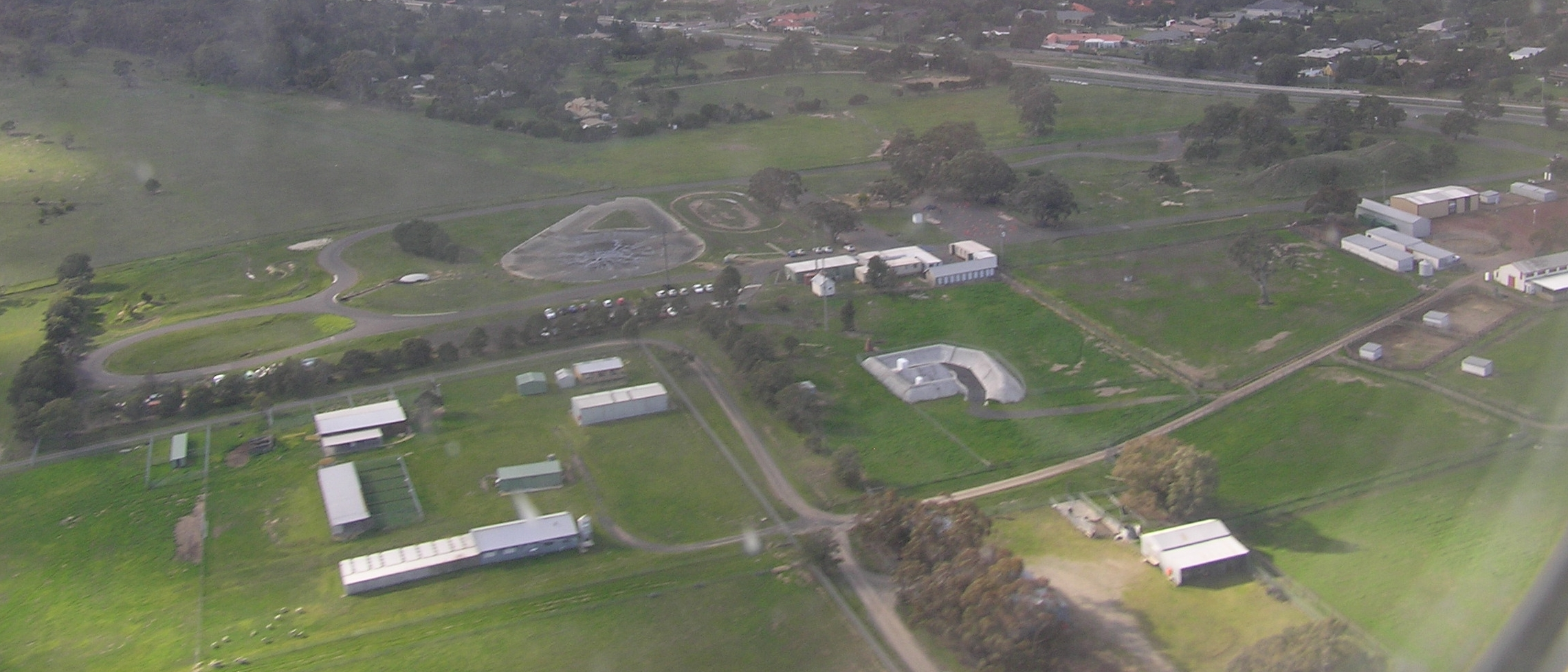
Police campus, with police dog kennels in the foreground, and driving range behind

Attwood is a suburb in Melbourne, Victoria, Australia, 17 km (11 mi) north-west of Melbourne's Central Business District, located within the City of Hume local government area. Attwood recorded a population of 3,309 at the 2021 census.

Attwood is home to Victoria Police's driver training track, Dog Squad and Mounted Branch. The Melway describes this area as 'Strictly out of Bounds'. The suburb is located south of Greenvale, along Mickleham Road.

== See also ==
- Shire of Bulla – Attwood was previously within this former local government area.
