= Dylan Wight =

Australian politician

Dylan Wight MP

Member of the Victorian Legislative Assembly for Tarneit
- Incumbent
- Assumed office 26 November 2022
- Preceded by: Sarah Connolly

Personal details
- Party: Labor
- Website: www.dylanwightmp.com.au

Dylan Wight is an Australian politician who is the current member for the district of Tarneit in the Victorian Legislative Assembly. He is a member of the Labor Party and was elected in the 2022 state election, replacing Sarah Connolly, who transferred to the new seat of Laverton.

Before being elected to Parliament, Wight worked as an organiser at the Australian Manufacturing Workers Union.

Wight is a member of the Victorian Socialist Left faction in the Labor Party.
