= Geoff Leigh (politician) =

Australian politician (born 1952)

Geoffrey Graeme Leigh (born 24 August 1952) is a former Australian politician. He was a Liberal member of the Victorian Legislative Assembly, representing Malvern from 1982 to 1992 and Mordialloc from 1992 to 2002.

== Early life ==
Leigh was born in Mordialloc in Melbourne to marine engineer Ronald Pearson Leigh and his wife, schoolteacher Anne Thora Whiteside. He was educated in Papua New Guinea at Samarai Island State School before attending Mentone Boys Grammar, Parkdale Secretary College and Moorabbin Technical College. He began an apprenticeship in carpentry and joinery in 1969 and completed it in 1972. Active in the Liberal Party, he was president and membership officer of the Mentone Young Liberals in 1975 and was on the Young Liberal Movement State Executive 1978–79.

== Politics ==
In 1979, he was the unsuccessful Liberal candidate for the state seat of Brunswick, and in 1982 he contested Heatherton, again unsuccessfully. However, later in 1982, he was selected as the Liberal candidate for a by-election for the safe seat of Malvern, being vacated by former premier Lindsay Thompson. Leigh was elected, and in 1985 he became Opposition Whip in the Assembly. He was promoted to a shadow ministerial role in 1988, holding the Consumer Affairs and Prices portfolio. He left the front bench in 1989 and did not return during the Kennett Government; he was elected to the seat of Mordialloc in 1992 after being defeated by Robert Doyle in a Malvern preselection. He returned to the front bench after Kennett's defeat, serving as shadow transport minister from 1999 until his defeat in 2002.

== Post-parliament career ==
=== Lobbyist ===
Leigh later worked as a lobbyist for developers, including John Woodman. Leigh later appeared before IBAC in regard to Mr Woodman's alleged payments to councillors at the City of Casey in exchange for favourable planning decisions.

Leigh, along with his lobbying business partner, each earned $500,000 each for helping to get a Cranbourne egg farm owned by Mr Woodman’s son rezoned to residential.

=== Bayside council ===
Leigh was elected to Bayside Council at its 2024 election as an unendorsed ‘Independent Liberal’ candidate.

== Personal life ==
Leigh has been twice married: firstly to Georgina Gibson on 1 May 1985, and secondly to Andree Patrice Martin on 11 December 1991. He has three children. He lives in Melbourne’s City of Bayside.

Parliament of Victoria
Preceded by Lindsay Thompson	Member for Malvern; 1982–1992	Succeeded by Robert Doyle
District created	Member for Mordialloc; 1992–2002	Succeeded by Janice Munt
