= Parkdale, Victoria =

Parkdale
- Suburb
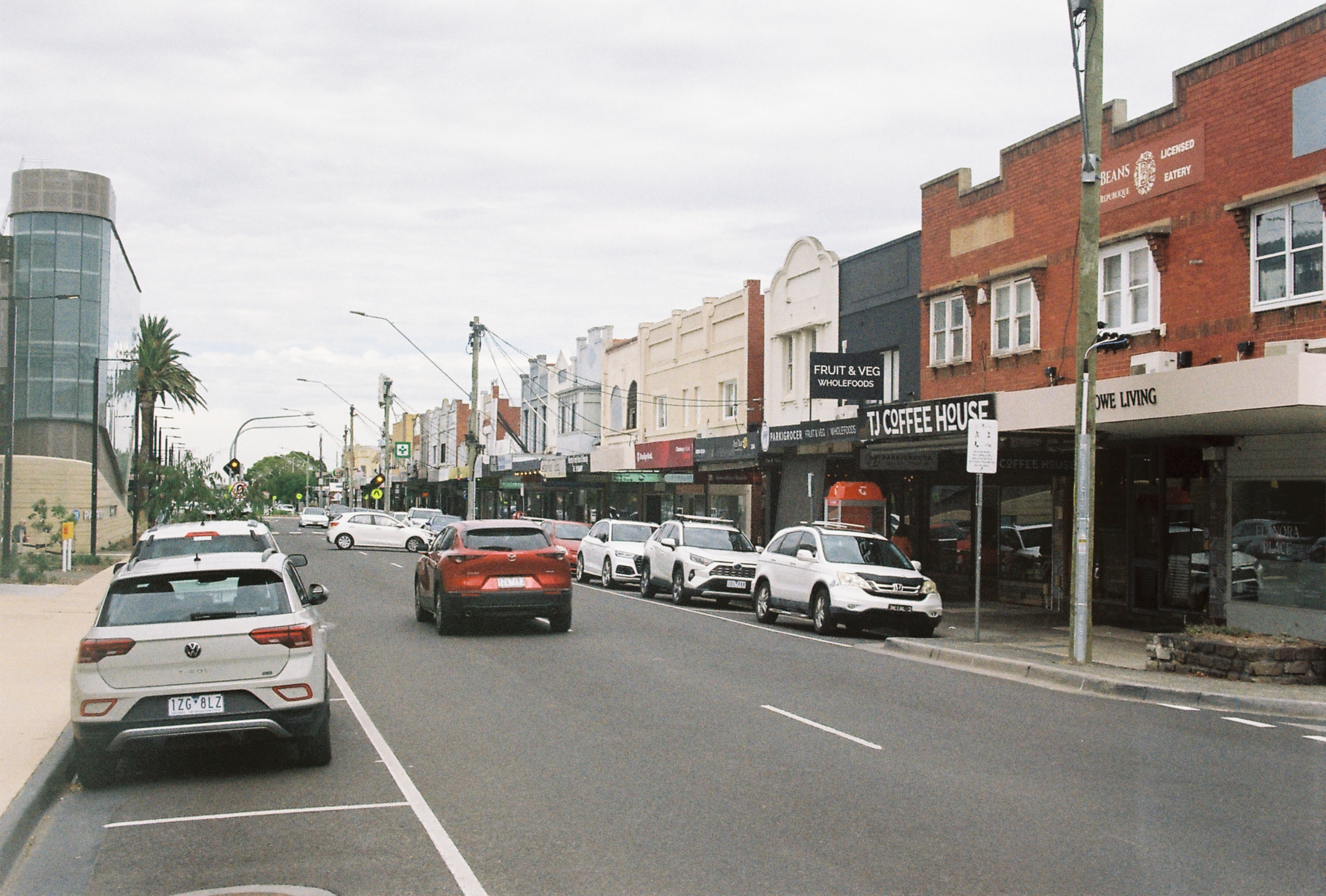
- Parkdale 2026

- Interactive map of Parkdale
- Coordinates: 37.991°S 145.08°E
- Country: Australia
- State: Victoria
- City: Melbourne
- LGA: City of Kingston
- Location: 23 km (14 mi) from Melbourne

Government
  - State electorate: Mordialloc
  - Federal division: Isaacs

Area
  - Total: 3.6 km^{2} (1.4 sq mi)
- Elevation: 22 m (72 ft)

Population
  - Total: 12,308 (2021 census)
  - Density: 3,420/km^{2} (8,850/sq mi)
- Postcode: 3195
Suburbs around Parkdale
Mentone	Mentone	Moorabbin Airport
Mentone	Parkdale	Mordialloc
Port Phillip	Port Phillip	Mordialloc

Parkdale is a suburb in Melbourne, Victoria, Australia, 23 km south-east of Melbourne's Central Business District, located within the City of Kingston local government area. Parkdale recorded a population of 12,308 at the 2021 census.

It is situated between the suburbs of Mentone and Mordialloc, and is located on the Frankston railway line.

Parkdale was founded in 1920, and named for early homesteader William Parker when engineers decided to build a railway station alongside a cluster of five bayside shops. Parkdale Post Office opened on 6 January 1921.

Parkdale's local library, Kingston Library, is located on Parkers Road adjacent to Parkdale station. Parkdale is also a noted beach-side suburb. The beach is a 750-metre walk from the station.

== Education ==
- Parkdale Primary School
- Parkdale Secondary College (Note: Technically, the campus is located in the adjacent suburb of Mordialloc, Victoria.)
- Parktone Primary School
- St. John Vianney's Primary School

== Politics ==
Since 2014, Parkdale has been represented in the Victorian state parliament by Tim Richardson, Member for the electoral district of Mordialloc, and in federal parliament by Mark Dreyfus, Member for Isaacs since 2007.

== Transport ==
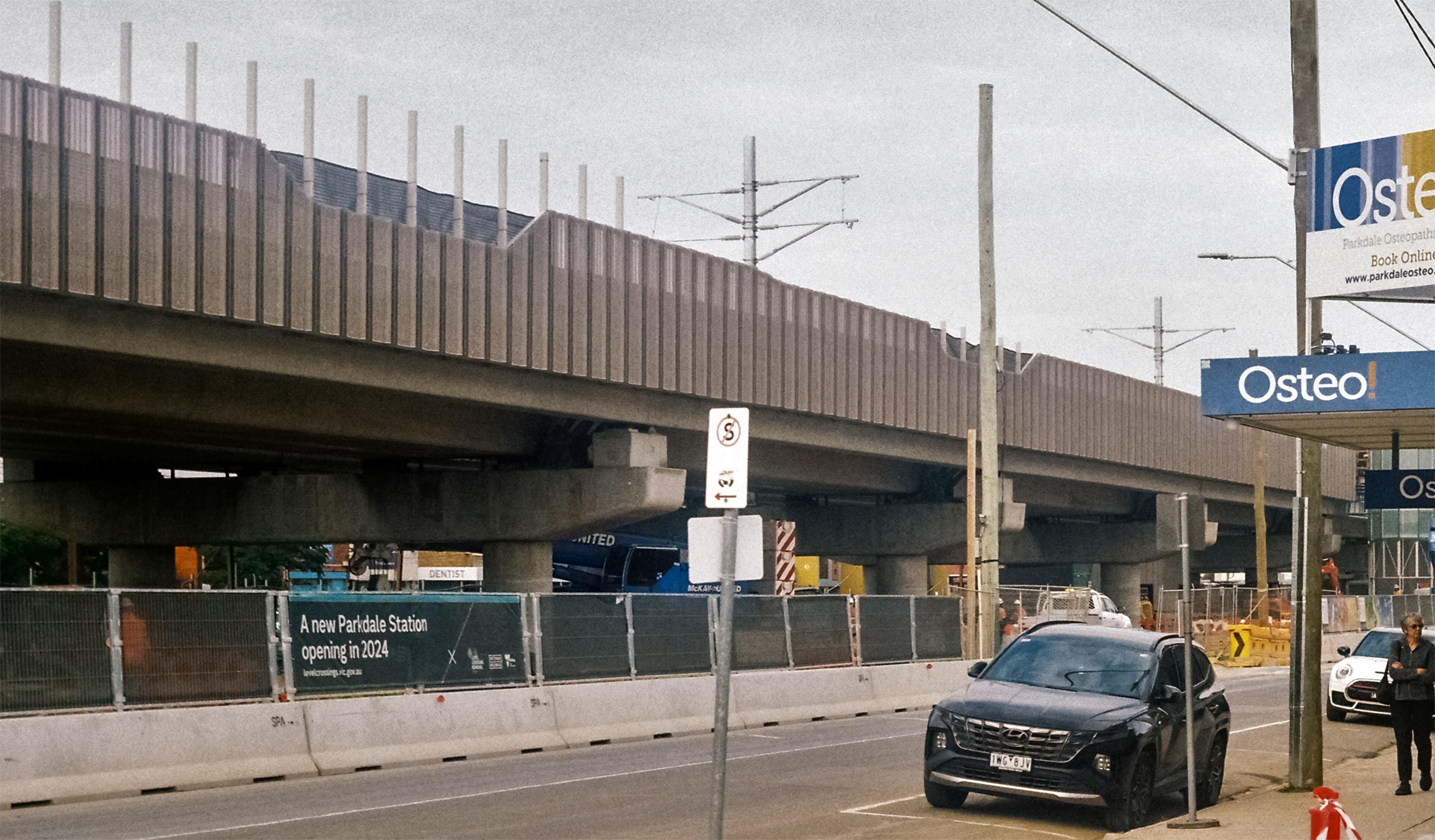
Parkdale railway station being built

Parkdale is accessible by a number of Public Transport Victoria bus routes servicing the area. The 903 bus service from Mordialloc passes through Parkdale along Beach Road. The 708 bus from Carrum to Hampton station stops at Parkdale railway station. This train line services the area via Parkdale Station, located on the Frankston line, operating in Zone 2.

On 29 July 2021, the Andrews Labor Government announced it would remove the Parkdale/Mentone Warrigal Road and Parkers Road level crossings, with a rail bridge over road solution between Mentone and Parkdale. These works were completed in 2025. The new Parkdale station was completed in August 2024, along with the re-opened and level crossing free Warrigal and Parkers Roads.

== Demographics ==
11,185 people live in Parkdale according to the 2011 Australian census with 75.58% listing themselves as being born in Australia. Australia is the most common birthplace for people living in Parkdale, followed by 6.04% who list themselves as UK born. Other countries of birth include New Zealand (1.59%), Greece (0.89%), Italy (0.75%), China (0.73%) and India (0.72%).

By ancestry most people living in Parkdale are of English descent with 62.79% of respondents listing English ancestry in the 2011 Australia census. Other common ancestries listed include Irish (14.16%), Scottish (10.36%), Italian (5.18%), German (3.67%), Greek (3.35%) and Chinese (1.67%). 34.99% of respondents listed their ancestry as 'Australian'.

== Notable people with a connection to the suburb ==
- Steven King - Melbourne Cup winning jockey
- Rick Springfield - Singer/actor.
- Rex Hunt - Former AFL player/commentator. Born in neighbouring Mentone, played football for Parkdale.
- Scott Boland - Australian fast bowler. Played for the Parkdale Cricket Club.
- Nicole Livingstone - Olympian. Attended Parkdale Secondary College.

== See also ==
- City of Mordialloc – Parkdale was previously within this former local government area.
