= Tim Richardson (politician) =

Australian politician (born 1988)

The Honourable Tim Richardson MP
- Richardson in 2014

Minister for Local Government
- Incumbent
- Assumed office 4 August 2026
- Premier: Ben Carroll
- Preceded by: Paul Hamer

Minister for Consumer Affairs
- Incumbent
- Assumed office 4 August 2026
- Premier: Ben Carroll
- Preceded by: Paul Edbrooke

Minister for Renters
- Incumbent
- Assumed office 4 August 2026
- Premier: Ben Carroll
- Preceded by: Paul Edbrooke

Cabinet Secretary
- In office 15 April 2026 – 4 August 2026
- Premier: Jacinta Allan
- Preceded by: Steve McGhie
- Succeeded by: Nina Taylor
Parliamentary secretary roles
Parliamentary Secretary to the Premier
In office 19 December 2024 – 15 April 2026
Minister	Jacinta Allan
Parliamentary Secretary for Men's Behaviour Change
In office 28 May 2024 – 15 April 2026
Minister	Natalie Hutchins
Parliamentary Secretary for Mental Health and Suicide Prevention
In office 5 December 2022 – 19 December 2024
Minister	Ingrid Stitt
Parliamentary Secretary for Health Infrastructure
In office 5 December 2022 – 28 May 2024
Minister	Mary-Anne Thomas
Parliamentary Secretary for Schools
In office 29 November 2018 – 5 December 2022
Minister	James Merlino
Parliamentary Secretary for Mental Health and Social Inclusion
In office 25 June 2018 – 5 December 2022
- Minister: Gabrielle Williams

Member of the Victorian Legislative Assembly for Mordialloc
- Incumbent
- Assumed office 29 November 2014
- Preceded by: Lorraine Wreford

Personal details
- Born: 18 September 1988 (age 38)
- Party: Labor Party
- Children: 2
- Education: Deakin University (LLB/BCom)
- Website: www.timrichardsonmp.com.au

Timothy Noel Richardson (born 18 September 1988) is an Australian politician. He has been a Labor Party member of the Victorian Legislative Assembly since November 2014, representing the Legislative Assembly seat of Mordialloc.

== Personal life ==
Richardson is married and has 2 young daughters. Richardson was the first member of his family to attend university; he attained a Bachelor of Laws/Bachelor of Commerce from Deakin University.

== Parliamentary career ==
Richardson was first elected to State Parliament representing Mordialloc for the Labor party's at the 2014 Victorian State election, defeating incumbent Lorraine Wreford, who had held the seat since 2010, with a swing of 3.6%.

Upon the election of the Andrews Labor Government, Richardson was appointed to the Committee for the Environment, Natural Resources and Regional Development, as well as the Independent Broad-Based Anti-corruption Commission Committee.

He was re-elected in 2018 and again in 2022. The 2018 result with a 11.5% two party preferred swing in his favour.

Richardson was one of six Labor MPs to vote against the legalisation of euthanasia in Victoria.

Originally a member of Labor Right, Richardson joined Labor's left faction along with six of his colleagues shortly after the 2022 Victorian state election; giving Labor Left a majority of the state Labor parliamentary caucus.

In August 2026, Richardson was appointed Minister for Local Government and Consumer Affairs in the Carroll government.

Victorian Legislative Assembly
Preceded by Lorraine Wreford	Member for Mordialloc; 2014–present	Incumbent
Political offices
Preceded by Inaugural	Parliamentary Secretary for Schools; 2018–present	Incumbent
