= Tim Pallas =

Australian politician

The Honourable Tim Pallas

Treasurer of Victoria
- In office 4 December 2014 – 19 December 2024
- Premier: Daniel Andrews; Jacinta Allan
- Preceded by: Michael O'Brien
- Succeeded by: Jaclyn Symes

Minister for Economic Growth
- In office 2 October 2023 – 19 December 2024
- Premier: Jacinta Allan
- Preceded by: Himself (as Minister for Economic Development)
- Succeeded by: Danny Pearson (as Minister for Economic Growth and Jobs)

Minister for Trade and Investment
- In office 29 November 2018 – 19 December 2024
- Premier: Daniel Andrews; Jacinta Allan
- Preceded by: Philip Dalidakis
- Succeeded by: Position abolished

Minister for Industrial Relations
- In office 29 November 2018 – 19 December 2024
- Premier: Daniel Andrews; Jacinta Allan
- Preceded by: Natalie Hutchins
- Succeeded by: Jaclyn Symes

Minister for Economic Development
- In office 29 November 2018 – 5 December 2022
- Premier: Daniel Andrews
- Preceded by: Position established
- Succeeded by: Himself (as Minister for Economic Growth)

Member of the Victorian Legislative Assembly for Werribee
- In office 29 November 2014 – 6 January 2025
- Preceded by: District re-established
- Succeeded by: John Lister

Member of the Victorian Legislative Assembly for Tarneit
- In office 25 November 2006 – 29 November 2014
- Preceded by: Mary Gillett
- Succeeded by: Telmo Languiller

Personal details
- Born: 7 January 1960 (age 66) Newcastle, New South Wales, Australia
- Party: Labor
- Children: Two
- Education: Australian National University
- Occupation: Trade union official
- Website: www.timpallas.com.au

Timothy Hugh Pallas (born 7 January 1960) is an Australian former politician. He was a Labor Party member of the Victorian Legislative Assembly from 2006 to 2025, representing the electorate of Tarneit until 2014 and then Werribee from 2014 to 2025. He served as Treasurer of Victoria in all three of the Andrew Ministries from December 2014 to December 2024, and in the Allan Ministry from 2023 to 2024. Pallas previously served as Minister for Roads and Ports and Minister for Major Projects in the Brumby Ministry until 2010.

== Early career ==
Prior to entering parliament, Pallas worked as a trade union official with the National Union of Workers, Assistant Secretary of the ACTU and as Chief of Staff to Premier of Victoria Steve Bracks.

== Career ==
Pallas first contested the open preselection for the federal seat of Melbourne Ports in 1998, but was defeated by Michael Danby.

In 2005, Pallas challenged incumbent backbencher Mary Gillett for preselection in the safe state seat of Tarneit, and with Bracks' backing, was successful. He was easily elected at the 2006 state election, and was immediately appointed to Cabinet, being assigned the roads and ports portfolio.

In 2010, Pallas called Formula One driver Lewis Hamilton a "dickhead" while launching a road safety initiative. Hamilton had been caught by police engaging in an act of 'hoon driving' in a $160,000 Mercedes on the previous Friday night.

When he was Minister for Roads and Ports, he implemented a number of measures to improve traffic flow on the major Victorian freeways including the Monash CityLink West Gate Upgrade. In February 2010, he launched a $5 million study into traffic flow along Hoddle Street between CityLink and the Eastern Freeway. The study had been previously announced in the Victorian Transport Plan in 2008. In March 2010, he approved a ban on trucks using the right-hand lane on busy sections of three-lane freeways. The RACV had campaigned for the ban for two years, attracting support from an "overwhelming 83% of motorists [it] surveyed".

Transferring to the electorate of Werribee following a boundary redistribution, Pallas was again successful at the 2014 Victorian state election and was appointed Treasurer after the election of the Andrews Labor Government. His first budget in May 2015 provided for the biggest spend on education in Victoria's history.

Pallas was additionally appointed Minister for Trade in June 2022.

He was elected for a fifth time at the 2022 Victorian state election. Originally a member of Labor Right, Pallas defected to Labor Left along with six of his colleagues shortly after the 2022 Victorian state election; his defection meant that the positions of Premier, Deputy Premier and Treasurer were all held by members of Labor Left, and also ensured that Labor Left constituted a majority of the state Labor caucus.

Pallas resigned as Treasurer and member for Werribee in December 2024.

Post-politics, Pallas joined Melbourne law firm Gordon Legal, from which he runs a strategic advisory firm.

== Personal life ==
Pallas resides in Williamstown, in Melbourne's west.

Pallas is married with two children, and is a supporter of the Werribee Tigers, the Western Bulldogs, the Melbourne Storm, Melbourne Victory and the Melbourne Vixens.

Victorian Legislative Assembly
Preceded by Mary Gillett	Member for Tarneit; 2006–2014	Succeeded by Telmo Languiller
New seat	Member for Werribee; 2014–2025	Succeeded by John Lister
Political offices
Preceded by Wade Noonan	Minister for Resources; 2017–2018	Succeeded by Jaclyn Symes
Preceded by Michael O'Brien	Treasurer of Victoria; 2014–2024	Succeeded by Jaclyn Symes
New title	Minister for Economic Development; 2018–2024	Succeeded by Danny Pearson as Minister for Economic Growth and Jobs
Preceded by Natalie Hutchins	Minister for Industrial Relations; 2018–present	Succeeded by Danny Pearson as Minister for Economic Growth and Jobs
Preceded by Martin Pakula	Minister for Trade; 2022–2024	Ministry abolished
