= Lorraine Wreford =

Australian politician

Member of the Victorian Legislative Assembly for Mordialloc
- In office 27 November 2010 – 29 November 2014
- Preceded by: Janice Munt
- Succeeded by: Tim Richardson

Personal details
- Born: 10 August 1961 (age 64) Victoria, Australia
- Party: Liberal Party
- Children: 4 sons
- Website: lorrainewreford.com.au

Lorraine Joan Wreford (born 10 August 1961) is an Australian politician, and was the member of Mordialloc in the Victorian Legislative Assembly from 2010 to 2014. She was Mayor of the City of Casey before defeating Janice Munt in the 2010 state election.

Wreford attended Sandringham College and the Royal Melbourne Institute of Technology, subsequently working in the fields of photography and healthcare. She was elected to Casey City Council in 2003. In 2009 she studied financial services and began a business as a finance broker. She was elected Mayor of Casey in 2010.

Wreford was defeated by Labor candidate Tim Richardson at the 2014 Victorian Election.

After her defeat, Wreford worked for Melbourne developer John Woodman. In 2019 Wreford appeared before the Victorian IBAC and admitted that as part of her work for Mr Woodman, she 'personally deliver[ed] tens of thousands of dollars of cash stuffed into envelopes to a City of Casey councillor and conceded the payments were bribes to get favourable planning decisions.'

Parliament of Victoria
Preceded by Janice Munt	Member for Mordialloc; 2010–2014	Succeeded by Tim Richardson
