= Andrews ministry =

Andrews ministry may refer to:

- Andrews ministry (Northern Ireland), the second Government of Northern Ireland
- First Andrews ministry, the 69th Cabinet of Victoria
- Second Andrews ministry, the 70th Cabinet of Victoria
- Third Andrews ministry, the 71st Cabinet of Victoria
