= Electoral district of Laverton =

Laverton Victoria—Legislative Assembly
- Interactive map of electoral district boundaries from the 2022 state election
- State: Victoria
- Created: 2022
- MP: Sarah Connolly
- Party: Labor
- Namesake: Laverton, Victoria
- Electors: 48,545 (2022)
- Area: 87 km^{2} (33.6 sq mi)
- Demographic: Urban

The Electoral district of Laverton is an electoral district of the Victorian Legislative Assembly in Australia. It was created in the redistribution of electoral boundaries in 2021, and came into effect at the 2022 Victorian state election.

It covers an area in the south western suburbs of Melbourne that was previously covered by the districts of Footscray, Tarneit, Altona, Kororoit and St Albans. It includes the suburbs of Sunshine, Braybrook, Albion, Ardeer, Sunshine West, Truganina, Laverton and Williams Landing.

== Members for Laverton ==
Member	Party	Term
Sarah Connolly	Labor	2022–present

== Election results ==
2022 Victorian state election: Laverton
Party	Candidate	Votes	%	±%
Labor	Sarah Connolly	17,026	45.9	−11.6
Liberal	Raja Reddy	8,233	22.2	+1.9
Greens	Braishna Durzada	3,496	9.4	−2.5
Victorian Socialists	Catherine Robertson	2,206	5.9	+5.9
Democratic Labour	Michael Wirth	2,051	5.5	+5.5
Family First	David Fry	1,353	3.6	+3.6
New Democrats	Gurneet Soni	1,082	2.9	+2.9
Animal Justice	Pouya Bagheri	694	1.9	−2.0
Freedom	Trent Raymond	641	1.7	+1.7
Independent	Rufo Paredes	355	1.0	+1.0
Total formal votes		37,132	92.2	−1.1
Informal votes		3,149	7.8	+1.1
Turnout		40,281	83.0	+5.8
Two-party-preferred result
Labor	Sarah Connolly	25,393	68.4	−5.0
Liberal	Raja Reddy	11,739	31.6	+5.0
Labor hold		Swing	−5.0	

== See also ==
- Parliaments of the Australian states and territories
- List of members of the Victorian Legislative Assembly
