= Electoral district of Greenvale =

State electoral district of Victoria, Australia

Greenvale Victoria—Legislative Assembly
- Interactive map of electoral district boundaries from the 2022 state election
- State: Victoria
- Created: 2022
- MP: Iwan Walters
- Party: Labor
- Namesake: Greenvale, Victoria
- Electors: 47,810
- Area: 60 km^{2} (23.2 sq mi)
- Demographic: Urban

The electoral district of Greenvale is an electoral district of the Victorian Legislative Assembly in Australia. It was created in the redistribution of electoral boundaries in 2021, and came into effect at the 2022 Victorian state election.

It covers an area in the north western suburbs of Melbourne that was previously covered by the districts of Yuroke and Broadmeadows. It includes the suburbs of Roxburgh Park, Somerton, Greenvale, Meadow Heights, Attwood, and parts of Westmeadows and Craigieburn.

== Members for Greenvale ==
Member	Party	Term
Iwan Walters	Labor	2022–present

== Election results ==
2022 Victorian state election: Greenvale
Party	Candidate	Votes	%	±%
Labor	Iwan Walters	15,628	41.5	−18.6
Liberal	Usman Ghani	9,568	25.4	+1.1
Family First	Maria Bengtsson	2,778	7.4	+7.4
Victorian Socialists	Mutullah Can Yolbulan	2,582	6.9	+2.0
Independent	Fatma Erciyas	2,416	6.4	+6.4
Greens	Cristina Santa-Isabel	2,194	5.8	−1.1
Animal Justice	Rosanna Furina	1,295	3.4	+3.4
Freedom	Lauren Styles	1,225	3.2	+3.2
Total formal votes		37,686	91.9	−1.8
Informal votes		3,952	9.5	+1.8
Turnout		41,638	83.5	+3.2
Two-party-preferred result
Labor	Iwan Walters	21,506	57.1	−14.9
Liberal	Usman Ghani	16,180	42.9	+14.9
Labor hold		Swing	−14.9	

== See also ==
- Parliaments of the Australian states and territories
- List of members of the Victorian Legislative Assembly
