= Iwan Walters =

Australian politician

Iwan Walters MP

Member of the Victorian Legislative Assembly for Greenvale
- Incumbent
- Assumed office 27 November 2022
- Preceded by: new constituency

Personal details
- Political party: Labor
- Website: www.iwanwaltersmp.com.au

Iwan Walters is an Australian politician who is the current member for the district of Greenvale in the Victorian Legislative Assembly. He is a member of the Labor Party and was elected in the 2022 state election.

Prior to becoming a politician, he served as a secondary school teacher, and is a graduate of Oxford University.
