= Mary Gillett =

Australian politician

The Honourable Mary Gillett MP

Member of the Victorian Legislative Assembly for Tarneit
- In office 30 November 2002 – 25 November 2006
- Preceded by: New seat
- Succeeded by: Tim Pallas

Member of the Victorian Legislative Assembly for Werribee
- In office 30 March 1996 – 30 November 2002
- Preceded by: Ken Coghill
- Succeeded by: Seat abolished

Personal details
- Born: Mary Jane Douglas; 9 October 1958 (age 67) Sydney, New South Wales, Australia
- Party: Labor
- Children: Three
- Education: Australian National University (BA)

Mary Jane Gillett, née Douglas (born 9 October 1958) is a former Australian politician.

Born in Sydney, New South Wales, she graduated from Young High School in 1974 and received a Bachelor of Arts from the Australian National University in 1979. That year, she became a clerk in the Australian Taxation Office; in 1982 she became associate to Mr N. Taylor of the Australian Industrial Relations Commission, and in 1985 became National Industrial Officer with the Commonwealth Foremans' Association. In 1987 she became National Industrial Officer of the National Union of Workers.

== Political career ==
In 1996, Gillett was elected to the Victorian Legislative Assembly as the Labor member for Werribee. Her seat was abolished in 2002 and she transferred to Tarneit. During her tenure, she served multiple roles such as the Secretary for the Parliamentary Labor Party; Parliamentary Secretary for Volunteers; the 2006 Commonwealth Games, and Women's Affairs. In 2006 she was defeated for preselection by Tim Pallas, formerly chief of staff to Premier Steve Bracks, and Gillett retired from politics.

Parliament of Victoria
Preceded by Ken Coghill	Member for Werribee; 1996–2002	Succeeded by Abolished
Preceded by New seat	Member for Tarneit; 2002–2006	Succeeded by Tim Pallas
