= David Cunningham (politician) =

Australian politician

David James Cunningham (born 31 March 1936) is a former Australian politician.

He was born in Glen Huntly, and prior to politics he was an organiser and industrial officer with the Australian Workers' Union. In 1980 he was elected to Melton Shire Council, and he was also vice-president of the Western Region Commission.

A member of the Labor Party, he was elected to the Victorian Legislative Assembly in 1985 as the member for Derrimut, moving to Melton in 1992. He retired in 1999.

Victorian Legislative Assembly
New seat	Member for Derrimut; 1985–1992	Abolished
New seat	Member for Melton; 1992–1999	Succeeded by Don Nardella
