= Janice Munt =

Australian politician

Janice Ruth Munt (born 3 November 1955) is an Australian politician who represented the Labor Party in the Electoral district of Mordialloc from 2002 to 2010.

== Early life ==
Munt was born in Melbourne, Victoria and educated at Highett High School. Before entering politics she worked variously as a company director, shop assistant, hair dresser's assistant, waitress, cook, clerk, employee of the Federal Department of Education, and customer service agent and was a volunteer with homeless, school, kindergarten, environmental, health and women’s organisations.

== Political career ==
A member of the Labor Party, Munt ran for the Electoral district of Sandringham at the 1999 Victorian state election, earning a small swing in her favour.

She contested the neighbouring Electoral district of Mordialloc at the 2002 Victorian state election, defeating incumbent Liberal MP Geoff Leigh with a 7 percent swing in her favour.

Re-elected in 2006, Munt was targeted by anti-abortion organisations during her election campaign in 2010, having voted for abortion reform in parliament during 2008 and was narrowly defeated in the 2010 Victorian state election.

Munt was later a senior advisor to the Minister for Women and Prevention of Family Violence (2014–16), board chair of Central Bayside Community Health Services, and chair of the Better Health Network.

== Additional resources ==
- Janice Munt at The Australian Women's Register. Accessed 12 April 2006.
- Parliamentary Handbook entry. Accessed 12 April 2006.

Victorian Legislative Assembly
Preceded by Geoff Leigh	Member for Mordialloc; 2002–2010	Succeeded by Lorraine Wreford
