= Electoral district of Derrimut =

Former state electoral district of Victoria, Australia

Derrimut Victoria—Legislative Assembly
- State: Victoria
- Dates current: 1985–1992, 2002–2014
- Electors: 40,846 (2010)
- Area: 50 km^{2} (19.3 sq mi)
- Demographic: Metropolitan

Derrimut was an electoral district of the Victorian Legislative Assembly. It was located in the western suburbs of Melbourne and contained the suburbs of Albion, Derrimut as well as parts of St Albans and Sunshine.

It was first created in the redistribution undertaken before the 1985 election where it was easily won by the Labor Party's David Cunningham he held the seat until it was abolished before the 1992 election with Cunningham contesting and winning the seat of Melton.

However the seat was re-established prior to the 2002 election where it was won by Telmo Languiller whose seat of Sunshine was abolished in the same redistribution. Derrimut was again abolished in 2014, with Languiller shifting to the seat of Tarneit.

== Members ==
First incarnation (1985–1992)
Member	Party	Term
David Cunningham	Labor	1985–1992

Second incarnation (2002–2014)
Member	Party	Term
Telmo Languiller	Labor	2002–2014

== Election results ==
2010 Victorian state election: Derrimut
Party	Candidate	Votes	%	±%
Labor	Telmo Languiller	17,076	49.83	−13.61
Liberal	Wayne Tseng	7,971	23.26	+4.34
Greens	Geraldine Brooks	5,783	16.88	+8.89
Family First	Colin Moyle	2,001	5.84	−1.60
Democratic Labor	Michael Deverala	1,436	4.19	+4.19
Total formal votes		34,267	92.18	+0.69
Informal votes		2,906	7.89	−0.69
Turnout		37,173	91.01	−0.64
Two-party-preferred result
Labor	Telmo Languiller	22,123	64.35	−9.95
Liberal	Wayne Tseng	12,254	35.65	+9.95
Labor hold		Swing	−9.95	

== See also ==
- List of members of the Victorian Legislative Assembly
- Parliaments of the Australian states and territories
