= Electoral district of Mordialloc =

State electoral district of Victoria, Australia

Mordialloc Victoria—Legislative Assembly
- Interactive map of electoral district boundaries from the 2022 state election
- State: Victoria
- Created: 1992
- MP: Tim Richardson
- Party: Labor
- Namesake: Mordialloc
- Electors: 46,041 (2018)
- Area: 56 km^{2} (21.6 sq mi)
- Demographic: Outer metropolitan

The electoral district of Mordialloc is an electorate of the Victorian Legislative Assembly including the suburbs of Braeside, Mordialloc, Aspendale, Aspendale Gardens, Waterways, Edithvale, Chelsea, Chelsea Heights and Parkdale; and parts of Keysborough and Mentone. The current member is Tim Richardson.

Mordialloc is part of the Melbourne Sandbelt and has traditionally been considered a Bellwether electorate. Its previous members include Liberal representatives Lorraine Wreford and Geoff Leigh, and Labor member Janice Munt.

== Members ==
Member	Party	Term
Geoff Leigh	Liberal	1992–2002
Janice Munt	Labor	2002–2010
Lorraine Wreford	Liberal	2010–2014
Tim Richardson	Labor	2014–present

== Election results ==
2022 Victorian state election: Mordialloc
Party	Candidate	Votes	%	±%
Labor	Tim Richardson	19,398	44.0	−6.8
Liberal	Phillip Pease	13,829	31.4	+0.4
Greens	Daniel Lessa	4,526	10.3	+2.7
Independent	Sarah O'Donnell	3,240	7.4	+7.4
Animal Justice	Chi Vo	1,070	2.4	−0.7
Freedom	Deborah Albrecht	955	2.2	+2.2
Family First	Patrick Lum	887	2.0	+2.0
Independent	Phil Reid	154	0.3	+0.3
Total formal votes		44,059	95.6	+1.6
Informal votes		2,035	4.4	−1.6
Turnout		46,094	91.0	+3.5
Two-party-preferred result
Labor	Tim Richardson	25,640	58.2	−5.2
Liberal	Phillip Pease	18,419	41.8	+5.2
Labor hold		Swing	−5.2	
