= Sarah Connolly (politician) =

Australian politician

Sarah Connolly MP
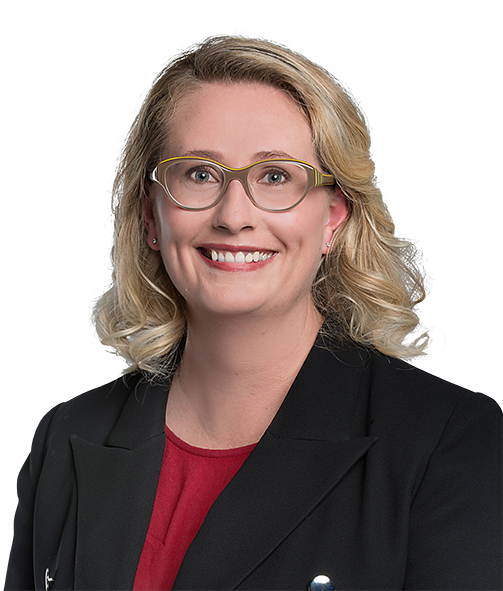

Member of the Victorian Legislative Assembly for Laverton
- Incumbent
- Assumed office 26 November 2022
- Preceded by: New seat

Member of the Victorian Legislative Assembly for Tarneit
- In office 24 November 2018 – 26 November 2022
- Preceded by: Telmo Languiller
- Succeeded by: Dylan Wight

Personal details
- Born: 29 December 1981 (age 44)
- Party: Labor Party
- Spouse: Scott Connolly
- Children: 3
- Education: University of Queensland
- Committees: Member, Legislative Assembly Economy and Infrastructure Committee March 2019 – February 2021 Chair, Legislative Assembly Environment and Planning Committee December 2020 – August 2022; Member, Scrutiny of Acts and Regulations Committee December 2018 – November 2022; Chair, Public Accounts and Estimates Committee August 2022 – November 2022 Chair, Public Accounts and Estimates Committee since February 2023
- Website: www.sarahconnollymp.com.au

Sarah Connolly (born 29 December 1981) is an Australian politician. She has been an Australian Labor Party member of the Victorian Legislative Assembly since 2018, representing the electorates of Tarneit (2018–2022) and Laverton (2022–present), in Melbourne's outer west.

== Early life ==
Connolly grew up in the coastal township of Kingscliff in northern New South Wales.

She holds a Bachelor of Laws from the University of Queensland and Graduate Diploma of Legal Practice from the Queensland University of Technology.

== Early career ==
Prior to entering into politics, Connolly worked in the criminal justice system as a judge's associate, and in a law firm. She also worked for the Australian Competition and Consumer Commission and Australian Energy Regulator, and spent over a decade working across public and privately owned energy networks in policy, legislative reform and regulatory frameworks.

== Personal life ==
Connolly is married to Scott Connolly, Assistant Secretary of the Australian Council of Trade Unions. Together they have had three children conceived through IVF; her eldest was stillborn at 37 weeks.

== Political career ==
Connolly was pre-selected by the Labor Party as its candidate for Tarneit in 2017 and went on to be elected at the 2018 Victorian State Election. She was a board member of VicHealth, and is a member of the Transport Workers Union and the Commonwealth Parliamentary Association.

At the 2022 state election, she stood in the new electorate of Laverton, which had been established in a redistribution, and was elected.

Parliament of Victoria
Preceded by Telmo Languiller	Member for Tarneit; 2018–2022	Succeeded by Dylan Wight
Preceded by New district	Member for Laverton; 2022–present	Incumbent
