= Don Nardella =

Australian politician

Member of the Victorian Legislative Assembly for Melton
- In office 18 September 1999 – 24 November 2018
- Preceded by: David Cunningham
- Succeeded by: Steve McGhie

Personal details
- Born: 9 November 1958 (age 67) Footscray, Victoria
- Party: Independent (2017–2018)
- Other political affiliations: Labor (1999–2017)

Donato Antonio "Don" Nardella (Italian: [doˈnaːto anˈtɔːnjo narˈdɛlla]; born 9 November 1958) is an Australian politician. He was a member of the Parliament of Victoria from 1992 until 2018, representing Melbourne North Province in the Legislative Council (1992-1999) and Melton in the Legislative Assembly (1999–2018). He was a member of the Labor Party from 1992 until 2017, when he was forced to resign from the Labor caucus over an expenses scandal; he then sat in parliament as an independent.

Nardella was born in the Melbourne suburb of Footscray, and received First Class Welder Certificates in the early 1980s. In 1981 he received a licence as a crane driver and chaser. He became a Labor Party state organiser in 1985, and remained prominent in the union movement as a member of the Municipal Executive.

In 1992, Nardella was elected to the Victorian Legislative Council on the Labor ticket for Melbourne North Province. He was appointed Shadow Minister for Aged Care and Shadow Minister Assisting on Workcover in 1995, exchanging Aged Care for Consumer Affairs in 1999. In that year he transferred to the lower house, winning the safe seat of Melton.

In December 2014, Nardella was elected Deputy Speaker of the Legislative Assembly, under Speaker Telmo Languiller. In February 2017, Languiller was found to have been claiming a second residence allowance for a house in Queenscliff, and later resigned his position. Questioned by the media about the allowance, Nardella conceded he had claimed around $100,000 of the same allowance for a house in Ocean Grove, and announced he would resign as deputy speaker on the same day as Languiller. On 28 February 2017, Nardella announced he would retire from politics at the next state election. Premier Daniel Andrews demanded that Nardella repay the $100,000 he had claimed, which he refused to do; accordingly Andrews demanded his resignation from the Labor Party, and Nardella resigned to sit as an independent on 7 March 2017.

Victorian Legislative Council
Preceded by Giovanni Sgro	Member for Melbourne North Province; 1992–1999; Served alongside: Caroline Hogg	Succeeded by Marsha Thomson
Victorian Legislative Assembly
Preceded by David Cunningham	Member for Melton; 1999–2018	Succeeded by Steve McGhie
