= Electoral district of Tarneit =

State electoral district of Victoria, Australia

Tarneit Victoria—Legislative Assembly
- Interactive map of electoral district boundaries from the 2022 state election
- State: Victoria
- Created: 2002
- MP: Dylan Wight
- Party: Labor Party
- Namesake: Suburb of Tarneit
- Electors: 53,882 (2018)
- Area: 76 km^{2} (29.3 sq mi)
- Demographic: Urban

The electoral district of Tarneit is an electoral district of the Victorian Legislative Assembly. It was created before the 2002 election where it replaced the seat of Werribee.

The seat is located in the south western suburbs of Melbourne, including Tarneit, Williams Landing, Truganina and the eastern parts of Hoppers Crossing. It is a safe seat for the Labor Party with a current margin of 14.6%.

The first member for the seat, elected in 2002, was Mary Gillett, formerly member for abolished Werribee. She was defeated for Labor preselection for the 2006 election by Tim Pallas, then chief of staff to Premier Steve Bracks. Following an electoral redistribution for the 2014 election, Pallas moved to the recreated seat of Werribee, and Telmo Languiller, formerly member for abolished Derrimut, replaced him in Tarneit.

== Members for Tarneit ==
Member	Party	Term
Mary Gillett	Labor	2002–2006
Tim Pallas	Labor	2006–2014
Telmo Languiller	Labor	2014–2018
Sarah Connolly	Labor	2018–2022
Dylan Wight	Labor	2022–present

== Election results ==
2022 Victorian state election: Tarneit
Party	Candidate	Votes	%	±%
Labor	Dylan Wight	18,173	46.6	−9.8
Liberal	Preet Singh	10,438	26.8	+0.9
Greens	Clare Miller	2,883	7.4	−0.3
Victorian Socialists	Claudio Uribe	2,072	5.3	+5.3
Family First	Thomas Jeffrey	1,977	5.1	+5.1
New Democrats	Jaydeep Patel	1,176	3.0	+3.0
Freedom	Erum Maqsood	882	2.3	+2.3
Animal Justice	Maurita Rahn	843	2.2	+2.2
Ind. (United People's)	Aijaz Moinuddin	534	1.4	+1.4
Total formal votes		38,977	93.0	+0.2
Informal votes		2,947	7.0	−0.2
Turnout		41,924	85.9	+0.4
Two-party-preferred result
Labor	Dylan Wight	24,276	62.3	−5.6
Liberal	Preet Singh	14,701	37.7	+5.6
Labor hold		Swing	−5.6	
