= Steve McGhie =

Australian politician

Steve McGhie MP
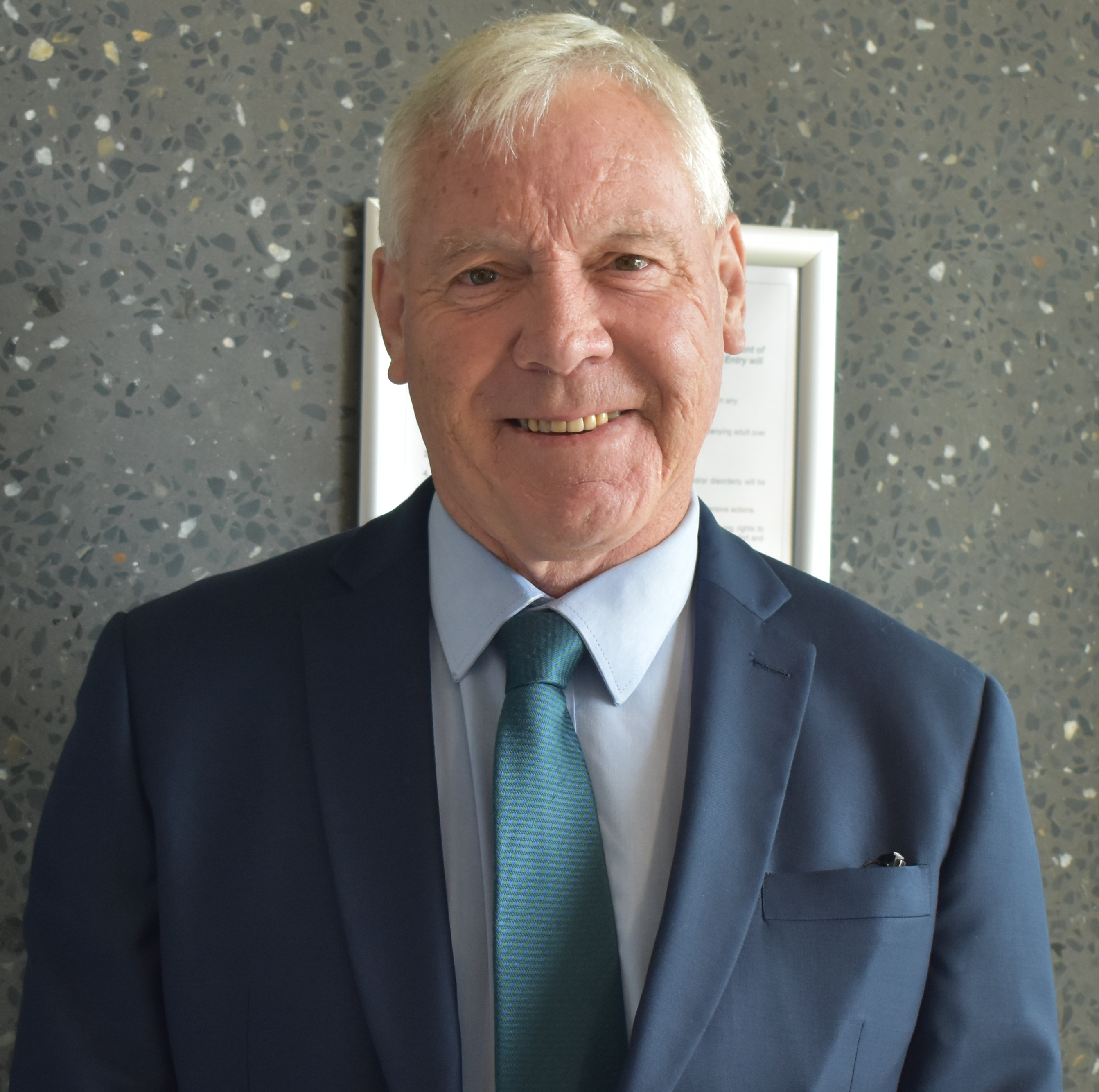
- McGhie in 2026

Member of the Victorian Legislative Assembly for Melton
- Incumbent
- Assumed office 24 November 2018
- Preceded by: Don Nardella

Personal details
- Party: Labor Party
- Website: stevemcghie.com.au

Stephen John McGhie is an Australian politician. He has been a Labor Party member of the Victorian Legislative Assembly since November 2018, representing the seat of Melton. In December 2020, McGhie was sworn in as the Parliamentary Secretary for Health in the Andrews' Government.

McGhie was formerly the state secretary of Ambulance Employees Australia – Victoria.

On 23 September 2025, McGhie confirmed that he would not recontest his seat at the 2026 Victorian state election.

He is the brother of former VFL footballer Robbie McGhie.

Parliament of Victoria
Preceded by Don Nardella	Member for Melton; 2018–present	Incumbent
