= Telmo Languiller =

Australian politician

The Honourable Telmo Languiller

36th Speaker of the Victorian Legislative Assembly
- In office 23 December 2014 – 25 February 2017
- Preceded by: Christine Fyffe
- Succeeded by: Colin Brooks

Member of the Victorian Legislative Assembly for Tarneit
- In office 29 November 2014 – 24 November 2018
- Preceded by: Tim Pallas
- Succeeded by: Sarah Connolly

Member of the Victorian Legislative Assembly for Sunshine
- In office 18 September 1999 – 30 November 2002
- Preceded by: Ian Baker
- Succeeded by: Seat abolished

Member of the Victorian Legislative Assembly for Derrimut
- In office 30 November 2002 – 29 November 2014
- Preceded by: New seat
- Succeeded by: Seat abolished

Personal details
- Born: 31 July 1957 (age 69) Montevideo, Uruguay
- Party: Labor Party

Telmo Ramon Languiller-Tornesi (born 31 July 1957) is an Australian politician. He was a Labor Party member of the Victorian Legislative Assembly from 1999 to 2018, representing the electorates of Sunshine (1999–2002), Derrimut (2002–2014) and Tarneit (2014–2018). From 23 December 2014, he was Speaker of the Victorian Legislative Assembly, but was forced to resign in March 2017 for claiming a second house allowance. While entitled to the allowance, it failed the test of public opinion and Languiller was forced to repay the allowance by the Premier. He currently serves as Melbourne Victory FC's director of international relations.

== Parliamentary career ==
From 1993 to 1996, Languiller was electorate officer for former Deputy Prime Minister Brian Howe, and became Chief of Staff for Andrew Theophanous in 1996 until 1999.

In 1999, he was selected as the Labor candidate for the safe seat of Sunshine, succeeding Ian Baker whom he had beaten in the preselection, and was duly elected. His seat was abolished in 2002 and replaced with Derrimut, which Languiller won. In 2002 he was appointed Parliamentary Secretary for Community Services, and he served as Acting Speaker since 2004. In 2006 he moved to the Parliamentary Secretary for Multicultural Affairs position, and then to Human Services in 2007.

Following the election of the Daniel Andrews Labor government at the 2014 state election, Languiller was elected Speaker of the Victorian Legislative Assembly.

In February 2017, The Age newspaper reported that Languiller had claimed $37,678 in second residence allowances to live in Queenscliff, a considerable distance from his western suburbs electorate of Tarneit. Languiller acknowledged that claiming the allowance had not met "community standards", and offered to repay the money. On 25 February, he resigned as speaker. In January 2018, Victoria Police announced it had conducted an investigation into the allowance claims of Languiller and deputy speaker Don Nardella, and found insufficient evidence to charge either man with an offence.

In August 2017, Languiller announced he was retiring from politics, and would not contest the next election in 2018.

== Personal life ==
Languiller was born in Montevideo, Uruguay, but soon migrated to Australia. He attended high school at Flemington in Victoria, and received a Bachelor of Arts majoring in sociology and politics from Footscray Institute of Technology. He had previously worked as a labourer, a Spanish interpreter, and a trade unionist.

Parliament of Victoria
Preceded by Ian Baker	Member for Sunshine; 1999–2002	Abolished
New seat	Member for Derrimut; 2002–2014	Abolished
Preceded by Tim Pallas	Member for Tarneit; 2014–2018	Succeeded by Sarah Connolly
Preceded by Christine Fyffe	Speaker of the Victorian Legislative Assembly; 2014–2017	Succeeded by Colin Brooks
