= 2022 Victorian state election =

Election for the 60th Parliament of Victoria

- 26 November 2022 (Note: The election in the seat of Narracan was deferred to 28 January 2023.)

All 88 seats in the Victorian Legislative Assembly All 40 seats in the Victorian Legislative Council 45 seats needed for a majority
- Opinion polls
- Registered: 4,394,465
- Turnout: 3,868,615 (88.03%) (▲0.29 pp)
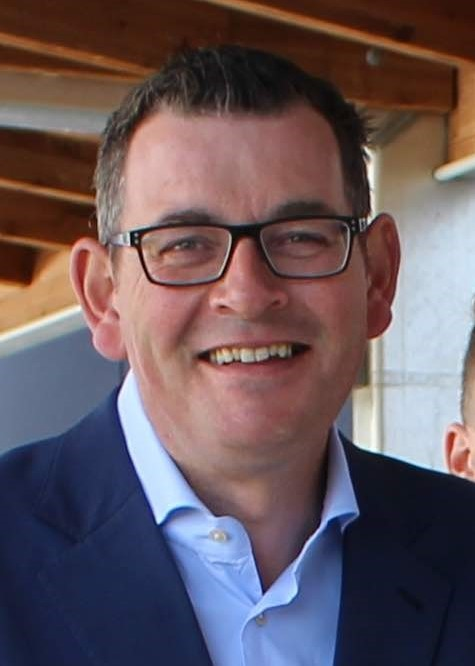

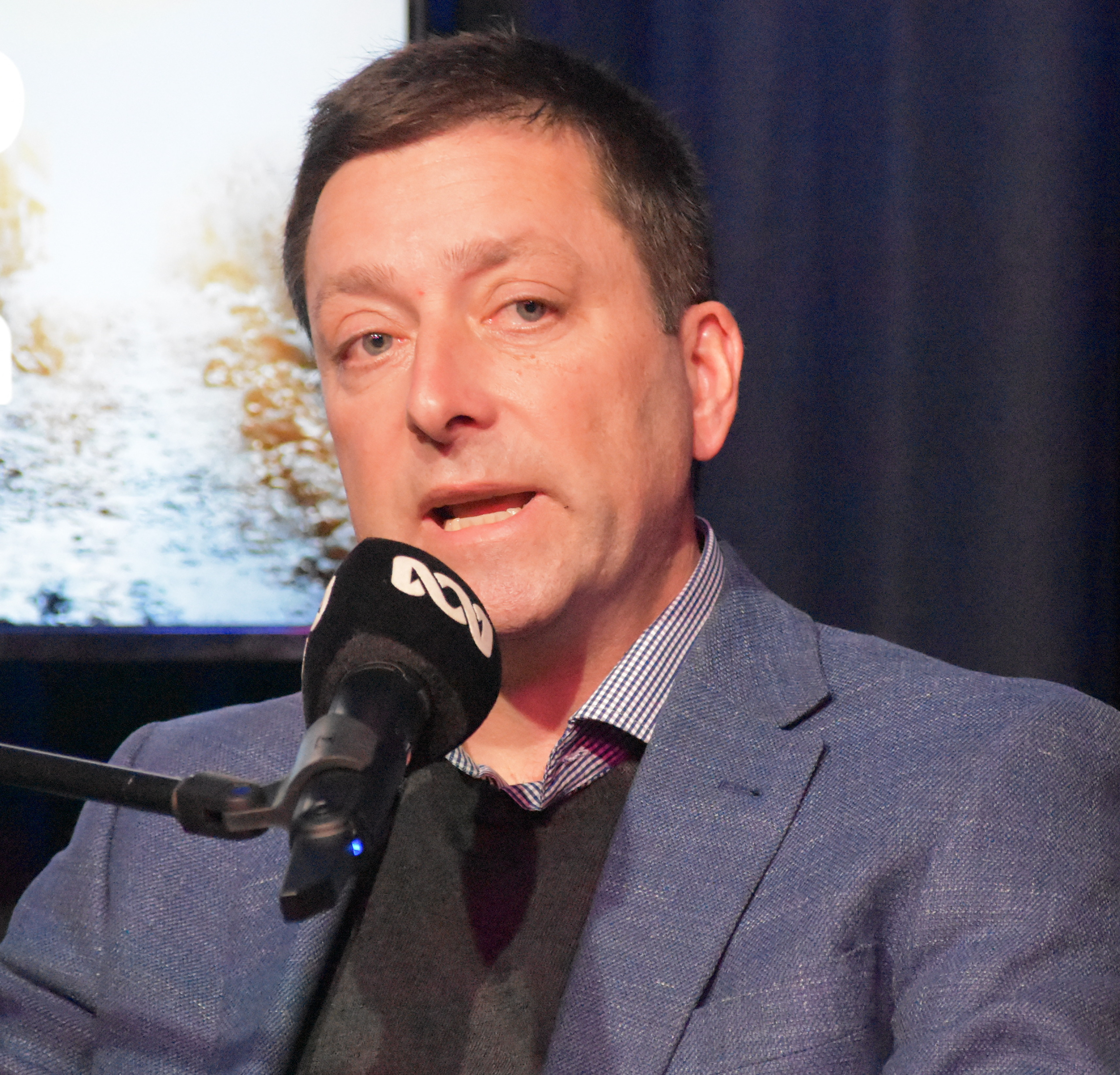

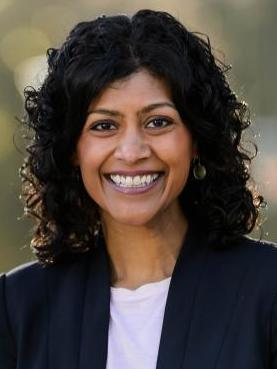
	First party	Second party	Third party
Leader	Daniel Andrews	Matthew Guy	Samantha Ratnam
Party	Labor	Liberal–National coalition	Greens
Leader since	3 December 2010	7 September 2021	12 October 2017
Leader's seat	Mulgrave	Bulleen	MLC for Northern; Metropolitan
Last election	55 seats, 42.86%	27 seats, 35.19%	3 seats, 10.17%
Seats before	55	27	3
Seats won	56	28	4
Seat change	▲1	▲1	▲1
Primary vote	1,339,496	1,260,100	420,201
Percentage	36.66%	34.48%	11.50%
Swing	▼6.20	▼0.71	▲0.79
TPP	55.00%	45.00%
TPP swing	▼2.30	▲2.30
Premier before election
Daniel Andrews
Labor
Premier after election
Daniel Andrews
Labor

The 2022 Victorian state election was held on Saturday, 26 November 2022 to elect the 60th Parliament of Victoria. All 88 seats in the Legislative Assembly (lower house) and all 40 seats in the Legislative Council (upper house) were up for election at the time the writs were issued, however the election in the district of Narracan was deferred due to the death of a candidate.

Despite a reduction in their primary and two-party-preferred vote, Labor was re-elected in a second consecutive landslide, winning 56 seats in the 88-seat Legislative Assembly, a net increase of one seat from the previous election in 2018. This was the sixth time that a Labor government was re-elected in Victoria, and it was Victorian Labor's second-best seat count at a state election, bested only by their result in the 2002 election. The Liberal/National Coalition made a net gain of one seat for an overall total of 28 seats: the Liberal Party won 19 seats, a net decrease of two from the previous election, while the Nationals won 9 seats, a net increase of three. The Greens won 4 seats, a net increase of one seat. All incumbent independents failed to retain their seats.

In the Legislative Council, Labor won 15 seats, six short of a majority, and the Coalition won 14 seats. On the crossbench, the Greens won 4 seats, Legalise Cannabis won 2 seats, and one seat each was won by Animal Justice, One Nation, Democratic Labour, the Liberal Democrats and Shooters, Fishers and Farmers.

Following the election, on 5 December 2022, the Third Andrews ministry was sworn in by the Governor. The new government was little-changed following a significant reshuffle earlier in 2022. The following week the Liberal Party elected John Pesutto leader of the party and Opposition Leader in the new parliament, after Guy had earlier stepped down from the position.

The election in the district of Narracan was deferred to 28 January 2023 due to the death of the National Party candidate Shaun Gilchrist on 21 November, five days before the scheduled election. Labor and the National Party did not contest the supplementary election.

For the election (including the supplementary), Victoria had compulsory voting and used majoritarian preferential voting in single-member seats for the Legislative Assembly, and single transferable voting (STV) along with a group voting ticket (GVT) in multi-member seats for the proportionally represented Legislative Council. The Legislative Council had 40 members serving four-year terms, elected from eight electoral regions each with five members. With each region electing 5 members, the quota in each region for election, after distribution of preferences, was 16.7% (one-sixth) of the valid votes cast in that district.

The election was conducted by the Victorian Electoral Commission (VEC), an independent body answerable to parliament.

== Background ==
=== Date ===
Pursuant to the Electoral Act 2002, Victoria has fixed terms, with all elections since the 2006 election held every four years on the last Saturday of November. This means that the date for the election was set for 26 November 2022. This could change only if Parliament had been dissolved unexpectedly beforehand.

=== Previous election and parliament ===
The Daniel Andrews-led Labor government was returned to power after one term in opposition by winning a majority of seats in the Legislative Assembly at the 2014 state election. The Labor party was decisively re-elected at the 2018 state election with a 5.3% two-party preferred swing, winning 55 seats in the Assembly. This was equal to Victorian Labor's second-best seat count ever at a state election. The Liberal/National Coalition dropped to 27 seats, the Greens won 3 seats and independents won the remaining 3 seats. There were no by-elections for the Assembly in the 59th parliament and the Assembly's composition was otherwise unchanged.

In the Legislative Council, the Labor party won 18 of the 40 seats, the Coalition 11 and the remaining seats were won by an array of minor parties. During the term, two Labor MLC's were either expelled or resigned from the party to sit as independents; (Adem Somyurek in June 2020 and Kaushaliya Vaghela in March 2022) while one Liberal MLC (Bernie Finn) was expelled from the party and joined the Democratic Labour Party in June 2022. This left the government with 16 seats in the Legislative Council, and opposition with 10, by the time of the election.

Daniel Andrews and the Labor government were seeking a third four-year term, something only John Cain Jr and Steve Bracks have previously achieved for Labor. Opposition Leader Matthew Guy stood down as Liberal leader several days after the party's poor result at the 2018 election and was replaced by Michael O'Brien. O'Brien's leadership was challenged twice in 2021, the second time resulting in O'Brien being replaced by Guy in a party room vote and Guy returning to the position.

== Electoral system ==
Victorian state elections are conducted by the Victorian Electoral Commission (VEC). Though Victoria has compulsory voting, at the 2018 election the voter turnout was just over 90%. Victoria uses instant-runoff voting in single-member seats for the Legislative Assembly, and single transferable vote in multi-member seats for the partially proportionally represented Legislative Council. The Legislative Council presently has 40 members serving four-year terms, elected from eight electoral regions each with five members. With each region electing 5 members, the quota in each region for election, after distribution of preferences, is 16.7% (one-sixth plus 1). Victoria is the only jurisdiction in Australia, at a state or federal level, that retains group voting tickets for the election of its upper house, resulting in preferences of voters voting "above-the-line" being transferred by inter-party agreements. Western Australia, the only other state to employ the system, abolished group voting tickets after the 2021 state election.

=== Redistribution ===
New electoral district boundaries, compared to those created in the 2014 redistribution, coloured by party vote in the 2018 state election. Lighter shades indicate a notional change in party hold as a result of redistribution, using electoral pendulum by the VEC.

The Electoral Boundaries Commission (EBC) of the Victorian Electoral Commission conducted a redistribution of electoral boundaries as there had been two general elections since the last redistribution. The previous redistribution took place prior to the 2014 election, and the new one was conducted in October 2021. According to commentators, Victoria's "booming population" would see new districts created in outer-suburban and inner-city areas, at the expense of middle-suburban areas. At the 2018 election the voter enrollment in individual districts ranged from 61,814 in Cranbourne to 38,937 in Mount Waverley.

On 30 June 2021, the EBC released draft boundaries for the Victorian Legislative Assembly for the 2022 election. The draft boundaries saw the creation of new electorates and the abolition of current ones. The EBC's final report was released on 28 October 2021.

Changes to electorates of the Legislative Assembly
Electorates abolished	Electorates created
Altona	Point Cook
Buninyong	Eureka
Burwood	Ashwood
Ferntree Gully	abolished
Forest Hill	Glen Waverley
Mount Waverley	Glen Waverley
Gembrook	Berwick
Gembrook	Pakenham
Keysborough	abolished
new seat	Laverton
Yuroke	Greenvale
Yuroke	Kalkallo

== Registered parties ==
There were 23 parties registered with the Victorian Electoral Commission (VEC) on 31 October 2022:

- Animal Justice Party
- Australian Values Party
- Australian Greens
- Australian Labor Party
- Companions and Pets Party
- Democratic Labour Party
- Derryn Hinch's Justice Party
- Family First Victoria
- Freedom Party of Victoria
- Health Australia Party
- Legalise Cannabis
- Liberal Democratic Party
- Liberal Party
- National Party
- New Democrats
- Pauline Hanson's One Nation
- Reason Party
- Restore Democracy Sack Dan Andrews Party
- Shooters, Fishers and Farmers Party
- Sustainable Australia Party
- Transport Matters Party
- United Australia Party
- Victorian Socialists

A further 5 applications to register were rejected by the VEC by parties that failed to meet the statutory threshold of 500 registered members: the Australian Democrats, Australian Federation, Fusion, Independence and Indigenous-Aboriginal parties.

In addition, three parties sought to register but later withdrew. Family First Victoria, unrelated to the party of the same name that contested the 2022 South Australian state election, announced it would withdraw its registration on 12 August. On 13 August, the Victorians Party—which had been formally registered by the VEC and had announced a series of candidates―announced it would not contest the election and was later deregistered by the VEC. On 29 September, the Legalise Marijuana Party confirmed it would withdraw after its application was challenged by the Legalise Cannabis Party.

Eight unregistered parties opted to endorse at least one independent candidate:

- Aligned Australia
- Australia One
- Child Protection Party
- Fusion
- Indigenous-Aboriginal Party
- Public Interests Before Corporate Interests
- Socialist Alliance
- United People's Party

== Candidates and retiring MPs ==
A record 740 candidates nominated to contest the 88 Legislative Assembly seats at the Victorian election on 26 November, well up on the previous record of 543 candidates in 2014 and the 507 in 2018. The 454 candidates for the Legislative Council is the highest number of upper house candidates in a Victorian election, up from 380 in 2018.

The following members announced that they were not contesting the 2022 election:

=== Labor ===
- Luke Donnellan MLA (Narre Warren North) – lost preselection 13 December 2021
- Nazih Elasmar MLC (Northern Metropolitan)
- John Eren MLA (Lara) – announced 26 November 2021
- Martin Foley MLA (Albert Park) – announced 23 June 2022
- Mark Gepp MLC (Northern Victoria) – announced 2 December 2021
- Danielle Green MLA (Yan Yean) – announced 24 November 2021
- Dustin Halse MLA (Ringwood) – announced 24 November 2021
- Jill Hennessy MLA (Altona) – announced 24 November 2021
- Marlene Kairouz MLA (Kororoit) – lost preselection 13 December 2021
- Frank McGuire MLA (Broadmeadows) – lost preselection 13 December 2021
- James Merlino MLA (Monbulk) – announced 23 June 2022
- Lisa Neville MLA (Bellarine) – announced 23 June 2022
- Martin Pakula MLA (Keysborough) – announced 23 June 2022
- Jaala Pulford MLC (Western Victoria) – announced 28 October 2022
- Robin Scott MLA (Preston) – lost preselection 13 December 2021
- Richard Wynne MLA (Richmond) – announced 25 November 2021

=== Liberal ===
- Bruce Atkinson MLC (Eastern Metropolitan) – announced 9 June 2022
- Gary Blackwood MLA (Narracan) – announced 9 November 2021
- Neale Burgess MLA (Hastings) – announced 11 November 2021
- Cathrine Burnett-Wake MLC (Eastern Victoria) – lost preselection 31 July 2022
- David Morris MLA (Mornington) – lost preselection 10 December 2021
- Gordon Rich-Phillips MLC (South Eastern Metropolitan) – announced 17 June 2022
- Tim Smith MLA (Kew) – announced 7 November 2021

=== National ===
- Steph Ryan MLA (Euroa) – announced 5 July 2022

=== Independent ===
- Russell Northe MLA (Morwell) – announced 26 July 2022

== Campaign and controversies ==
In the lead-up to the state election, Labor Premier Daniel Andrews committed to reviving the State Electricity Commission (SEC) if re-elected. The government would have a 51% shareholding in the new SEC. Andrews committed to amending the state's constitution to protect public ownership of the revived SEC if re-elected, to make it harder, although not impossible, for it to be privatised again in the future. Re-privatising the commission after such legislation would require a "special majority" of 60% of both the Legislative Assembly and Legislative Council, a situation which already exists for any potential privatisation of water services in Victoria under the Constitution of Victoria.

Matthew Guy and the Liberal Party began their election campaign on 2 November with a press conference that saw Guy unveil their "Ditch Dan" vehicle, a 1970s-era ambulance emblazoned with anti-Andrews slogans & graphics. The vehicle having the "Ambulance" designation above the drivers area caused the head of the Victorian Ambulance Union, Danny Hill, to question the legality of the vehicle as the state's Ambulance Services Act makes it an offence to use the word "ambulance" on any vehicle that is not owned or operated by an ambulance service without written authority of the Department of Health. The ambulance was used to tie into Guy's promise regarding the building of new hospitals and recruiting 40,000 new medical staff. Guy also promised to axe stamp duty for first home buyers on properties up to $1 million for 12 months.

On 8 November, Guy defended his party advertising attacking Dan Andrews for being a "prick", and the use of footage from anti-lockdown protests in Melbourne where protestors urinated on the Shrine of Remembrance and attacked police.

On 10 November, Guy downplayed his deputy David Southwick using two staffers employed by Southwick as actors in campaign ads without disclosing they are members of his campaign staff. When Guy was asked if the use of paid staffers in campaign ads was misleading, Guy replied by endorsing Southwick and stating that "it was not misleading" regardless of the lack of a disclaimer.

On 16 November, Australian Values Party leader Heston Russell leaked a video to the Herald Sun of him to talking to Glenn Druery about a potential preference deal, declaring that the AVP felt the co-ordination of the group voting ticket system used by Druery was immoral and needed to be exposed. This led to calls for the abolition of the group voting ticket, which Matthew Guy has said he would support and asked Andrews to commit to scrapping it, regardless of the election result. Andrews said he would wait until after the previously scheduled electoral reform review, due after the election, before making any changes.

On 17 November, the Victorian Electoral Commission announced that it had referred Guy and his former chief of staff to the Independent Broad-based Anti-corruption Commission after it had exhausted attempts to investigate an alleged violation of political donation disclosure laws. The investigation followed a leak of documents showing a proposed contract requiring a Liberal donor to pay a total of $125,000 to the chief of staff's private marketing firm, potentially in breach of the $4,210 limit on donations from individuals or organisations. In a statement outlining the referral, the Victorian electoral commissioner stressed that the VEC had not "received full co-operation from those connected to its investigation". However, Guy denied allegations of wrongdoing and insisted that he had provided material to the VEC. The following day, the Liberals accused the VEC of deliberate electoral interference and an "intent to damage the Liberal Party in the State Election" in a cease and desist letter by the party's lawyers.

On 19 November, the Liberal Party disendorsed Renee Heath, the first ranked candidate for the Liberal ticket in the Eastern Victoria Region of the upper house Victorian Legislative Council, from the party after her conservative religious views, including support for conversion therapy, were brought to light by a newspaper investigation. The decision came too late for Heath to be disendorsed by the party, and her position on the ticket made it an effective certainty that she will win a position in Parliament. Questions were raised over how much Guy and the Liberal Party knew of her views, and the accusations of Entryism made regarding Heath and her family by Liberal member Cathrine Burnett-Wake in her final address to Parliament after Heath defeated her for pre-selection.

Also on 19 November, Angry Victorians candidate and state MP Catherine Cumming declared at an anti-lockdown rally that she wished for Daniel Andrews to be turned into a "red mist". These comments were denounced by both Andrews and Matthew Guy, and led to the Victoria Police opening an investigation into Cumming for alleged promotion of violence.

On 20 November, The Age reported that the Liberal candidate for Narre Warren North, Timothy Dragan, opposed all recognition of Aboriginal people, said that he would vote against any legislation aimed at tackling climate change, would support a total ban on abortion, and that he called Liberal MP Brad Battin, the member for Berwick, a "prick".

Richmond Labor candidate Lauren O'Dwyer had some controversies relating to her Aboriginal heritage claim disputed by some.

On 21 November, Daniel Andrews claimed that there were neo-Nazi candidates running in the election and being recommended preferences on how to vote cards by the Liberal Party.

The only state leaders debate between Andrews and Guy was held on 22 November on Sky News Australia and Sky News Regional. Andrews was declared the winner, with 38% of the vote.

Labor accused a 'Greens-dominated' Darebin Council of removing Labor billboards in the seat of Northcote.

The campaign was notable for the level of 'nastiness', mainly fuelled by fringe right-wing parties and candidates opposed to COVID measures taken by the government.

=== Newspaper endorsements ===
Prior to the election, several newspapers around the country published editorials endorsing the party they believed should win. News Corp's Melbourne tabloid the Herald Sun, and its Sunday edition the Sunday Herald Sun endorsed the Coalition. News Corp's national masthead The Australian gave an endorsement to the Coalition. The company has been accused by several other media outlets of biased coverage against the Labor Party and Premier Daniel Andrews, with former Australian prime minister Kevin Rudd describing their electoral coverage as "dog-whistling to conspiracy theorists".

Nine Entertainment's national masthead the Australian Financial Review endorsed the Coalition, while Nine's Melbourne-based The Age endorsed Labor. Although the paper conceded that Andrews had become "arrogant", his party offered the better plan for the state.

==== Weekend editions ====
Newspaper	Owner	Endorsement
Sunday Herald-Sun	News Corp	Coalition
The Sunday Age	Nine Entertainment	No endorsement given

=== Metropolitan dailies ===
Newspaper	Owner	Endorsement
The Age	Nine Entertainment	Labor
The Australian	News Corp	Coalition
Australian Financial Review	Nine Entertainment	Coalition
Herald Sun	News Corp	Coalition

== Opinion polling ==
=== Graphical summary ===
Primary vote (2022)
View source data.
Two-party-preferred
View source data.

Preferred Premier
View source data.

Andrews approval rating
View source data.

Opposition Leaders approval rating
View source data.

=== Voting intention ===
Date	Firm	Primary vote					TPP vote	
Date	Firm	ALP	LIB	NAT	GRN	OTH	ALP	L/NP
21 – 24 November 2022	Newspoll	38%	35%*		12%	15%	54.5%	45.5%
22 – 23 November 2022	Roy Morgan	38%	32.5%*		12.5%	17% (Note: UAP 0.5%, Justice 1%, "teal independents" 4.5%, Other parties 11.0%)	55%	45%
16 – 21 November 2022	Resolve Strategic (Note: TPP calculated from respondent nominated preferences and results to one decimal place provided pre-election by Resolve Strategic)	36.2%	35.8%*		10.1%	17.9%	52.7%	47.3%
9 – 10 November 2022	Roy Morgan	40%	25.5%	3.5%	11.5%	19.5% (Note: UAP 0.5%, Justice 1%, "teal independents" 4.5%, Other parties 13.5%)	57%	43%
3 – 6 November 2022	Freshwater Strategy	37%	34%*		14%	15%	56%	44%
31 October – 6 November 2022	RedBridge	38%	38%*		14%	11%	53.5%	46.5%
28 October – 6 November 2022	Lonergan Research	42%	29%*		19%	11%	—N/a	—N/a
31 October – 3 November 2022	Newspoll	37%	37%*		13%	13%	54%	46%
23 October 2022	Resolve Strategic (Note: TPP vote not calculated)	38%	31%*		12%	18%	—N/a	—N/a
18 October 2022	Roy Morgan	42%	26%	2%	14.5%	15.5% (Note: One Nation 2%, UAP 1%, Liberal Democrats 1%, AJP 1%, SFF 0.5%, Justice 0.5%, Legalise Cannabis Australia 0.5%, "teal independents" 1%, other Independent 7%, Other parties 1%)	60.5%	39.5%
18 September 2022	Resolve Strategic	42%	28%*		12%	18%	—N/a	—N/a
11 – 13 September 2022	Roy Morgan	36.5%	29.5%*		14%	20.5% (Note: One Nation 2%, Liberal Democrats 1.5%, AJP 1%, Justice 0.5%, SFF 0.5%, UAP 0.5%, Legalise Cannabis Australia 0.5%, Independent 6.5%, Other 7.5%)	58%	42%
31 August – 7 September 2022	Essential	35.3%	32.2%*		10.2%	—N/a	56%	44%
22 – 25 August 2022	Newspoll	41%	36%*		13%	10%	56%	44%
11 – 13 August 2022	Roy Morgan	40.5%	27.5%*		14%	18% (Note: UAP 2%, Justice 1.5%, "teal independents" 5%, Other 9.5%)	60.5%	39.5%
30 June – 2 July 2022	Roy Morgan	43.5%	29.5%	2.5%	12%	15% (Note: UAP 2%, Justice 1%, "teal independents" 3%, Other 9%)	59.5%	40.5%
3 April 2022	Resolve Strategic	37%	33%*		10%	19%	—N/a	—N/a
15 January 2022	Resolve Strategic	41%	31%*		11%	17%	—N/a	—N/a
24 November 2021	Roy Morgan	45%	27%	2%	10.5%	15.5% (Note: UAP 4%, Justice 2%, Other 9.5%)	59.5%	40.5%
11 – 17 November 2021	Newspoll	44%	36%*		11%	9%	58%	42%
12 November 2021	Roy Morgan	43%	28%	3%	11%	15% (Note: UAP 3%, Justice 2%, Other 10%)	58%	42%
24 October 2021	Resolve Strategic	38%	34%*		10%	18%	—N/a	—N/a
7 September 2021	Matthew Guy becomes Liberal leader and leader of the opposition							
22 August 2021	Resolve Strategic	40%	35%*		10%	15%	—N/a	—N/a
12 – 15 June 2021	RedBridge	37%	38%	3%	12%	10%	52.4%	47.6%
13 June 2021	Resolve Strategic	37%	36%*		9%	17%	—N/a	—N/a
9 – 10 November 2020	Roy Morgan	45%	30.5%	4%	11%	9.5%	58.5%	41.5%
29 October – 4 November 2020	YouGov	44%	40%*		11%	5%	55%	45%
12 – 13 October 2020	Roy Morgan	40%	36%	4%	9%	6%	51.5%	48.5%
28 – 29 September 2020	Roy Morgan	39%	37%	2.5%	10%	6%	51.5%	48.5%
15 – 17 September 2020	Roy Morgan	37%	35%	3.5%	12%	8.5%	51.5%	48.5%
6 December 2018	Michael O'Brien becomes Liberal leader and leader of the opposition							
24 November 2018 election		42.9%	30.4%	4.8%	10.7%	11.2%	57.3%	42.7%
23 November 2018	Newspoll	41%	40%*		11%	8%	53.5%	46.5%
* Indicates a combined Liberal/National primary vote.
Newspoll polling is published in The Australian.

=== Preferred Premier and satisfaction ===
Date	Firm	Better Premier		Andrews		Guy	
Date	Firm	Andrews	Guy	Satisfied	Dissatisfied	Satisfied	Dissatisfied
21 – 24 November 2022	Newspoll	51%	35%	46%	48%	31%	56%
16 – 21 November 2022	Resolve Strategic	48%	34%	N/A			
9 – 10 November 2022	Roy Morgan	65.5%	34.5%	58.5%	41.5%	N/A	
3 – 6 November 2022	Freshwater Strategy	40%	28%	39%	48%	32%	48%
31 October – 3 November 2022	Newspoll	52%	33%	51%	44%	32%	52%
28 October 2022	Resolve Strategic	49%	29%	N/A			
18 September 2022	Resolve Strategic	46%	28%	N/A			
22 – 25 August 2022	Newspoll	51%	34%	54%	41%	32%	49%
11 – 13 August 2022	Roy Morgan	66%	34%	62.5%	37.5%	N/A	
30 June – 2 July 2022	Roy Morgan	64.5%	35.5%	63.5%	36.5%	N/A	
3 April 2022	Resolve Strategic	48%	31%	N/A			
15 January 2022	Resolve Strategic	47%	30%	N/A			
24 November 2021	Roy Morgan	N/A		63.5%	36.5%	N/A	
17 November 2021	Newspoll	54%	33%	56%	42%	34%	42%
11 November 2021	Roy Morgan	N/A		60.5%	39.5%	N/A	
24 October 2021	Resolve Strategic	45%	32%	N/A			
20 – 24 October 2021	Essential	not asked		52%	40%	not asked	
15 – 18 September 2021	Newspoll	not asked		64%	35%	not asked	
7 September 2021 Guy replaces O'Brien		Andrews	O'Brien	Andrews		O'Brien	
22 August 2021	Resolve Strategic	50%	24%	N/A			
12 – 15 June 2021	RedBridge	42.4%	23.1%	49.7%	46.5%	36.1%	44%
13 June 2021	Resolve Strategic	49%	23%	42%	32%	14%	22%
11 – 16 November 2020	Essential	not asked		65%	28%	not asked	
9 – 10 November 2020	Roy Morgan	not asked		71%	29%	not asked	
29 October – 4 November 2020	YouGov	not asked		65%	32%	26%	53%
28 October – 2 November 2020	Essential	not asked		61%	33%	not asked	
19 – 21 October 2020	Ipsos	53%	18%	52%	33%	15%	39%
14 – 19 October 2020	Essential	not asked		54%	40%	not asked	
12 – 13 October 2020	Roy Morgan	not asked		59%	41%	not asked	
29 – 30 September 2020	Roy Morgan	not asked		61%	39%	not asked	
16 – 19 September 2020	Newspoll	not asked		62%	35%	not asked	
8 – 9 September 2020	Roy Morgan	not asked		70%	30%	not asked	
15 – 18 July 2020	Newspoll	not asked		57%	37%	not asked	
24 – 28 June 2020	Newspoll	not asked		67%	27%	not asked	
21 – 26 April 2020	Newspoll	not asked		75%	17%	not asked	
6 December 2018 O'Brien replaces Guy		Andrews	Guy	Andrews		Guy	
24 November 2018 election		–	–	–	–	–	–
24 – 28 October 2018	Newspoll	45%	29%	45%	40%	31%	46%
22 – 24 October 2018	YouGov	not asked		44%	35%	24%	42%
7 October 2018	ReachTEL	51.3%	48.7%	not asked			
11 – 13 September 2018	YouGov	not asked		40%	42%	25%	44%
* Remainder were "uncommitted" or "other/neither". † Participants were forced to choose.
Newspoll polling is published in The Australian.

== Results ==
Winning party by electorate.

Change in Two-Party-Preferred vote by electorate compared to 2018.

=== Legislative Assembly ===
↓
56	4	9	19
ALP	GRN	NAT	LIB

Legislative Assembly (IRV) – (CV)
Party	Votes	%	Swing	Seats	Change
Labor	1,339,496	36.66	▼6.20	56	▲1
Liberal	1,087,413	29.76	▼0.67	19	▼2
National	172,687	4.73	▼0.04	9	▲3
Coalition total	1,260,100	34.48	▼0.71	28	▲1
Greens	420,201	11.50	▲0.79	4	▲1
Family First	111,478	3.05	New	0	Steady
Animal Justice	91,646	2.51	▲0.69	0	Steady
Freedom	64,066	1.75	New	0	Steady
Victorian Socialists	48,865	1.34	▲0.90	0	Steady
Democratic Labour	45,026	1.23	▲0.54	0	Steady
Liberal Democrats	14,116	0.39	▲0.27	0	Steady
Shooters, Fishers and Farmers	11,588	0.32	▼0.37	0	Steady
Reason	10,907	0.30	▼0.06	0	Steady
One Nation	10,323	0.28	New	0	Steady
Justice	7,927	0.22	▼0.04	0	Steady
Legalise Cannabis	5,838	0.16	New	0	Steady
New Democrats	4,874	0.13	New	0	Steady
Angry Victorians	3,037	0.08	New	0	Steady
Health Australia	862	0.02	New	0	Steady
Transport Matters	605	0.02	▼0.27	0	Steady
Companions and Pets	526	0.01	New	0	Steady
Independents	202,724	5.55	▼0.52	0	▼3
Total valid votes	3,654,205	94.46	–	–	–
Invalid/blank votes	214,410	5.54	–	–	–
Total	3,868,615	100	–	88	Steady
Registered voters / Turnout	4,394,465	88.03	–	–	–
Two-party-preferred vote*
Labor	1,989,350	55.00	−2.30	56	▲1
Coalition	1,627,650	45.00	+2.30	28	▲1

* TPP vote total excludes the electoral district of Narracan, where a supplementary election was held without a Labor candidate. TPP votes are calculated based on the estimate provided by the ABC election computer overseen by Antony Green.

==== Seats changing hands ====
Members in italics did not re-contest their Legislative Assembly seats at this election.

Seat	Pre-election			Swing	Post-election		
Seat	Party	Member	Margin	Swing	Margin	Member	Party
Bass	Liberal	Notional (Note: Jordan Crugnale was elected as the MP for Bass at the 2018 Victorian state election for the Australian Labor Party. However, redistribution by the Victorian Electoral Commission has resulted in the district notionally Liberal.)	0.7	–1.0	0.3	Jordan Crugnale	Labor
Bayswater	Liberal	Notional (Note: Jackson Taylor was elected as the MP for Bayswater at the 2018 Victorian state election for the Australian Labor Party. However, redistribution by the Victorian Electoral Commission has resulted in the district notionally Liberal.)	0.6	–4.6	4.0	Jackson Taylor	Labor
Glen Waverley	Liberal	Neil Angus	0.9	4.1	3.2	John Mullahy	Labor
Hastings	Liberal	Neale Burgess	0.0	1.2	1.2	Paul Mercurio	Labor
Hawthorn	Labor	John Kennedy	0.6	2.3	1.7	John Pesutto	Liberal
Mildura	Independent	Ali Cupper	0.0	1.3	1.3	Jade Benham	National
Morwell	Independent	Notional	4.0	–8.8	4.8	Martin Cameron	National
Nepean	Labor	Chris Brayne	0.7	7.4	6.7	Sam Groth	Liberal
Richmond	Labor	Richard Wynne	5.8	13.1	7.4	Gabrielle de Vietri	Greens
Shepparton	Independent	Suzanna Sheed	5.3	10.4	5.1	Kim O'Keeffe	National

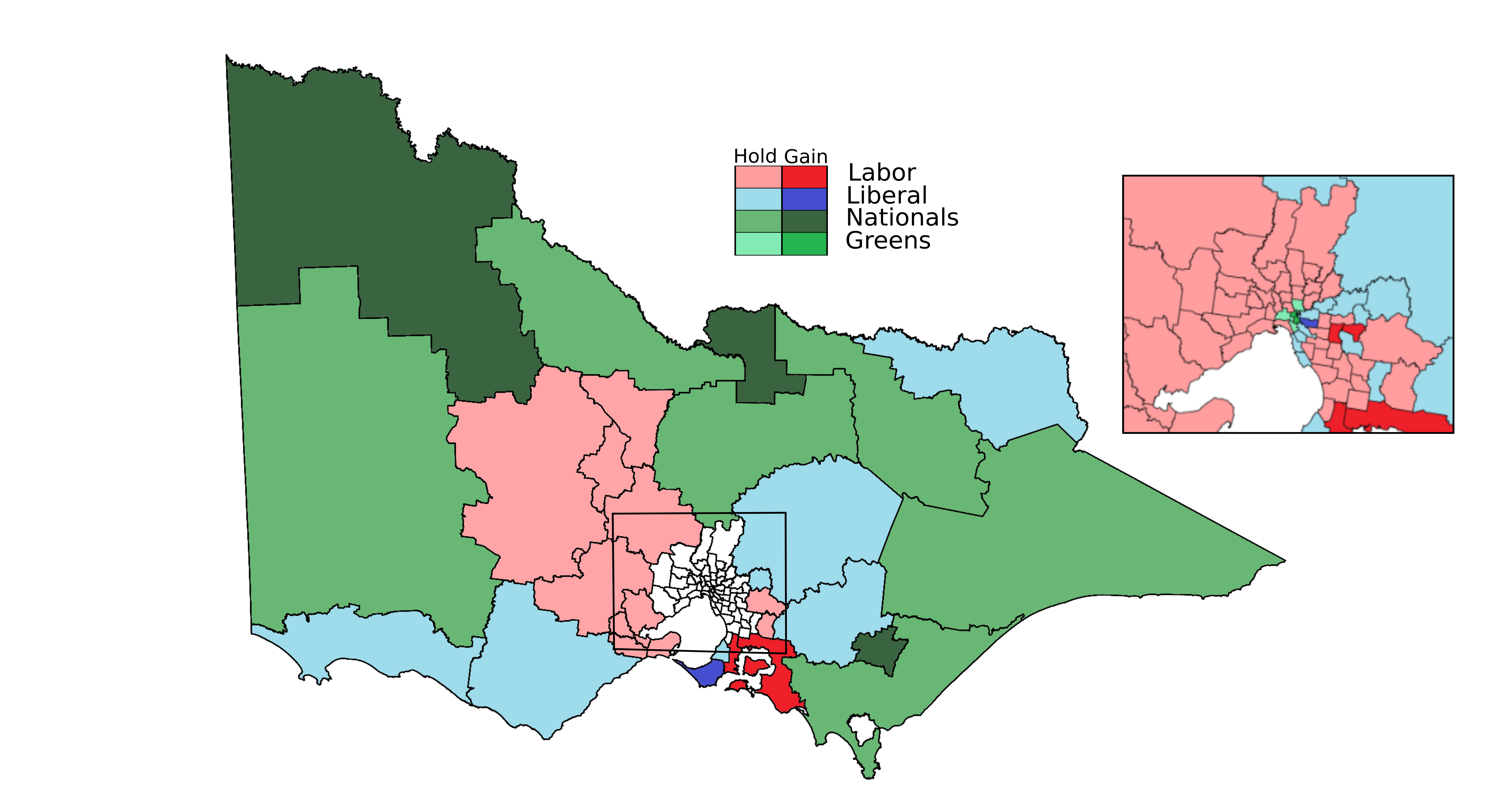
Results of the 2022 election with held and gained seats

The statewide swing against Labor in the primary vote and two-party-preferred vote was mainly concentrated in safe Labor seats in western Melbourne, where Labor members of the Legislative Assembly were re-elected with reduced majorities. Conversely, there was a smaller swing towards Labor in more marginal seats in Melbourne's east. Ultimately, the Labor Party lost the seats of Hawthorn and Nepean to the Liberal Party, as well as the seat of Richmond to the Greens, but won the seats of Glen Waverley and Hastings (the latter notionally almost tied following redistribution) from the Liberal Party.

The Labor-held seats of Bass and Bayswater, which were made notionally Liberal following redistribution, were retained by their Labor incumbents. The Liberal-held seat of Ripon, which was made notionally Labor following redistribution, was won by the Labor candidate. The independent seat of Morwell, which was made notionally Labor following redistribution, was won by the Nationals candidate.

No independent candidates were elected, with all incumbent independents defeated by the Nationals.

It is said by some experts that Labor's State Electricity Commission of Victoria policy had helped Labor win the election.

==== Narracan supplementary election ====
On 21 November, it was reported that the Nationals candidate for the district of Narracan, Shaun Gilchrist, died suddenly. Under electoral law, this means that the lower house election for Narracan has been declared as "failed" by the Victorian Electoral Commission. A supplementary election was held for that seat on 28 January 2023. The upper house election for that district (within the Eastern Victoria Region) was held as scheduled on 26 November.

Labor and the Nationals did not recontest the supplementary election. Animal Justice Party and Family First Victoria nominated new candidates for the supplementary election. The Liberal party retained Narracan with a slightly increased margin.

=== Legislative Council ===
Legislative Council (STV/GVT) – (CV)
Party	Votes	%	Swing	Seats	Change
Labor	1,238,710	33.01	-6.21	15	▼3
Liberal (metropolitan)	636,485	16.96	-0.19	8	▲1
Liberal/National joint ticket	468,289	12.48	+0.21		
Liberal (regional)				4	▲1
National				2	▲1
Coalition total	1,104,774	29.44	+0.02	14	▲3
Greens	387,190	10.32	+1.07	4	▲3
Legalise Cannabis	153,347	4.09	New	2	▲2
Democratic Labour	131,600	3.51	+1.41	1	▲1
Liberal Democrats	99,054	2.64	+0.14	1	▼1
Shooters, Fishers and Farmers	76,742	2.05	-0.97	1	Steady
One Nation	76,734	2.04	New	1	▲1
Family First	75,283	2.01	New	0	Steady
Justice	57,381	1.53	-2.22	0	▼3
Animal Justice	56,819	1.51	-0.96	1	Steady
Victorian Socialists	52,245	1.39	+0.48	0	Steady
Reason	47,070	1.25	-0.12	0	▼1
Freedom	39,910	1.06	New	0	Steady
Restore Democracy Sack Dan Andrews	31,262	0.83	New	0	Steady
United Australia	31,043	0.83	New	0	Steady
Health Australia	21,694	0.58	-0.21	0	Steady
Sustainable Australia	17,537	0.47	-0.36	0	▼1
Companions and Pets	16,464	0.44	New	0	Steady
Angry Victorians	14,896	0.40	New	0	Steady
Transport Matters	10,605	0.28	-0.34	0	▼1
New Democrats	7,743	0.21	New	0	Steady
Independents and ungrouped	4,303	0.11	+0.04	0	Steady
Total valid votes	3,752,406	96.78	–	–	–
Invalid/blank votes	124,726	3.22	–	–	–
Total	3,877,132	100.00	–	40	Steady
Registered voters / Turnout	4,394,465	88.23	–	–	–

The result in the Legislative Council meant the Labor Party and the left-leaning parties (namely the Greens, Legalise Cannabis, and Animal Justice) had a majority of seats in the chamber; 22 out of 40. After losing four out of five members via the group voting ticket system in the 2018 election, the Greens quadrupled their presence in the chamber. Notable results included the defeat of Reason Party leader Fiona Patten in the Northern Metropolitan region, defeated by former Labor minister and Democratic Labour Party candidate Adem Somyurek for the last position in the region, as well as the election of two Legalise Cannabis MPs to the parliament for the first time in the state's history. One Nation also elected its first state representative in Victoria.

==== Legislative Council seats table ====
Seat totals as noted by the Victorian Electoral Commission.

Region	Seats won	
Eastern Victoria	S	
North-Eastern Metropolitan		
Northern Metropolitan		
Northern Victoria		
South-Eastern Metropolitan	C	L
Southern Metropolitan		
Western Metropolitan	C	
Western Victoria		

Party key:

Labor
Liberal
Greens
National
C Legalise Cannabis
Democratic Labour
L Liberal Democrats
S Shooters, Fishers and Farmers
One Nation
Animal Justice

== Electoral pendulum ==
The state underwent a periodic review of its electoral boundaries which was completed in October 2021.

In August 2022, the Victorian Electoral Commission published a report with its own estimates of the results on the new electoral boundary margins. In September 2022, Australian Broadcasting Corporation (ABC) election analyst Antony Green released the seat classifications and new electoral pendulum used by the ABC, which are listed below.

=== Pre-election pendulum ===
Members in italics did not contest the election as a candidate for the seat they held or its replacement. However, Will Fowles, Brad Battin and Sarah Connolly contested a different seat to the one they held or its replacement. Lizzie Blandthorn moved to contest the Legislative Council. See the footnotes for details.

Extended content

Labor seats (56)
Seat	Member	Party	Margin
Marginal
Hawthorn	John Kennedy	ALP	0.6%
Nepean	Chris Brayne	ALP	0.7%
Northcote	Kat Theophanous	ALP	1.7% v GRN
Ashwood	Will Fowles (Note: Will Fowles would contest Ringwood at the election.)	ALP	2.0%
Pakenham	Brad Battin (Lib) (Note: Brad Battin would contest Berwick at the election.)	ALP	2.2%
Ripon	Louise Staley (Lib)	ALP	2.8%
South Barwon	Darren Cheeseman	ALP	3.0%
Box Hill	Paul Hamer	ALP	3.1%
Ringwood	Dustin Halse	ALP	3.2%
Morwell	Russell Northe (IND)	ALP	4.0%
Melton	Steve McGhie	ALP	5.0%
Richmond	Richard Wynne	ALP	5.8% v GRN
Fairly safe
Monbulk	James Merlino	ALP	7.1%
Eltham	Vicki Ward	ALP	8.8%
Werribee	Tim Pallas	ALP	9.1% v IND
Cranbourne	Pauline Richards	ALP	9.3%
Eureka	Michaela Settle	ALP	9.6%
Safe
Frankston	Paul Edbrooke	ALP	10.2%
Geelong	Christine Couzens	ALP	10.3%
Narre Warren South	Gary Maas	ALP	10.4%
Narre Warren North	Luke Donnellan	ALP	10.4%
Wendouree	Juliana Addison	ALP	11.0%
Bellarine	Lisa Neville	ALP	11.4%
Bentleigh	Nick Staikos	ALP	11.4%
Carrum	Sonya Kilkenny	ALP	12.0%
Bendigo East	Jacinta Allan	ALP	12.1%
Ivanhoe	Anthony Carbines	ALP	12.3%
Niddrie	Ben Carroll	ALP	12.5%
Point Cook	Jill Hennessy	ALP	12.8%
Albert Park	Martin Foley	ALP	13.1%
Macedon	Mary-Anne Thomas	ALP	13.4%
Mordialloc	Tim Richardson	ALP	13.4%
Sunbury	Josh Bull	ALP	14.5%
Clarinda	Meng Heang Tak	ALP	14.9%
Mulgrave	Daniel Andrews	ALP	15.8%
Essendon	Danny Pearson	ALP	15.8%
Oakleigh	Steve Dimopoulos	ALP	16.0%
Bundoora	Colin Brooks	ALP	16.2%
Yan Yean	Danielle Green	ALP	16.9%
Tarneit	Sarah Connolly (Note: Sarah Connolly would contest Laverton at the election.)	ALP	17.9%
Sydenham	Natalie Hutchins	ALP	18.3%
Bendigo West	Maree Edwards	ALP	18.6%
Lara	John Eren	ALP	19.1%
Williamstown	Melissa Horne	ALP	19.9%
Very safe
Kalkallo	Ros Spence	ALP	20.9%
Preston	Robin Scott	ALP	21.3% v GRN
St Albans	Natalie Suleyman	ALP	22.0%
Greenvale	New seat	ALP	22.0%
Pascoe Vale	Lizzie Blandthorn (Note: Lizzie Blandthorn would contest the Western Metropolitan Region in the Legislative Council.)	ALP	22.3%
Dandenong	Gabrielle Williams	ALP	23.1%
Laverton	New seat	ALP	23.4%
Mill Park	Lily D'Ambrosio	ALP	24.9%
Broadmeadows	Frank McGuire	ALP	25.2%
Kororoit	Marlene Kairouz	ALP	25.3%
Thomastown	Bronwyn Halfpenny	ALP	27.4%
Footscray	Katie Hall	ALP	27.6%

Liberal/National seats (27)
Seat	Member	Party	Margin
Marginal
Hastings	Neale Burgess	LIB	0.00%
Caulfield	David Southwick	LIB	0.04%
Sandringham	Brad Rowswell	LIB	0.4%
Brighton	James Newbury	LIB	0.5%
Bayswater	Jackson Taylor (ALP)	LIB	0.6%
Bass	Jordan Crugnale (ALP)	LIB	0.7%
Glen Waverley	Neil Angus	LIB	0.9%
Croydon	David Hodgett	LIB	1.0%
Eildon	Cindy McLeish	LIB	1.0%
Berwick	New seat	LIB	1.3%
Evelyn	Bridget Vallence	LIB	1.8%
Polwarth	Richard Riordan	LIB	2.0%
Benambra	Bill Tilley	LIB	2.6% v IND
South-West Coast	Roma Britnell	LIB	3.2%
Warrandyte	Ryan Smith	LIB	3.8%
Kew	Tim Smith	LIB	4.7%
Mornington	David Morris	LIB	5.0%
Rowville	Kim Wells	LIB	5.5%
Bulleen	Matthew Guy	LIB	5.5%
Fairly safe
Malvern	Michael O'Brien	LIB	6.0%
Safe
Narracan	Gary Blackwood	LIB	10.0%
Ovens Valley	Tim McCurdy	NAT	12.1%
Gippsland South	Danny O'Brien	NAT	14.2%
Euroa	Steph Ryan	NAT	15.8%
Gippsland East	Tim Bull	NAT	17.6%
Very safe
Lowan	Emma Kealy	NAT	21.1%
Murray Plains	Peter Walsh	NAT	24.0%

Crossbench seats (5)
Seat	Member	Party	Margin
Mildura	Ali Cupper	IND	0.00% v NAT
Melbourne	Ellen Sandell	GRN	1.7% v ALP
Brunswick	Tim Read	GRN	2.0% v ALP
Shepparton	Suzanna Sheed	IND	5.3% v LIB
Prahran	Sam Hibbins	GRN	8.2% v LIB

=== Post-election pendulum ===
Extended content

Labor seats (56)
Seat	Member	Party	Margin
Marginal
Northcote	Kat Theophanous	ALP	0.2% v GRN
Bass	Jordan Crugnale	ALP	0.2%
Pakenham	Emma Vulin	ALP	0.4%
Hastings	Paul Mercurio	ALP	1.4%
Pascoe Vale	Anthony Cianflone	ALP	2.0% v GRN
Preston	Nathan Lambert	ALP	2.1% v GRN
Ripon	Martha Haylett	ALP	3.0%
Glen Waverley	John Mullahy	ALP	3.3%
Bayswater	Jackson Taylor	ALP	4.2%
Footscray	Katie Hall	ALP	4.2% v GRN
Yan Yean	Lauren Kathage	ALP	4.3%
Melton	Steve McGhie	ALP	4.6%
Fairly safe
Ashwood	Matt Fregon	ALP	6.2%
Sunbury	Josh Bull	ALP	6.4%
Niddrie	Ben Carroll	ALP	6.7%
Greenvale	Iwan Walters	ALP	7.1%
Eureka	Michaela Settle	ALP	7.2%
Box Hill	Paul Hamer	ALP	7.2%
Ringwood	Will Fowles	ALP	7.5%
Monbulk	Daniela De Martino	ALP	7.6%
Bentleigh	Nick Staikos	ALP	8.0%
Mordialloc	Tim Richardson	ALP	8.2%
Narre Warren South	Gary Maas	ALP	8.3%
Point Cook	Mathew Hilakari	ALP	8.3%
Bellarine	Alison Marchant	ALP	8.5%
Frankston	Paul Edbrooke	ALP	8.7%
Narre Warren North	Belinda Wilson	ALP	8.7%
Sydenham	Natalie Hutchins	ALP	8.8%
Cranbourne	Pauline Richards	ALP	9.0%
Eltham	Vicki Ward	ALP	9.0%
Macedon	Mary-Anne Thomas	ALP	9.5%
St Albans	Natalie Suleyman	ALP	9.6%
Carrum	Sonya Kilkenny	ALP	9.8%
South Barwon	Darren Cheeseman	ALP	9.8%
Safe
Clarinda	Meng Heang Tak	ALP	10.2%
Mulgrave	Daniel Andrews	ALP	10.8% v IND
Bendigo East	Jacinta Allan	ALP	10.8%
Werribee	Tim Pallas	ALP	10.9%
Albert Park	Nina Taylor	ALP	11.2%
Mill Park	Lily D'Ambrosio	ALP	11.6%
Wendouree	Juliana Addison	ALP	11.9%
Tarneit	Dylan Wight	ALP	12.3%
Essendon	Danny Pearson	ALP	12.5%
Bundoora	Colin Brooks	ALP	12.7%
Ivanhoe	Anthony Carbines	ALP	13.0%
Williamstown	Melissa Horne	ALP	13.4%
Oakleigh	Steve Dimopoulos	ALP	13.5%
Kororoit	Luba Grigorovitch	ALP	14.5%
Bendigo West	Maree Edwards	ALP	14.6%
Geelong	Christine Couzens	ALP	14.7%
Broadmeadows	Kathleen Matthews-Ward	ALP	15.5%
Thomastown	Bronwyn Halfpenny	ALP	15.8%
Lara	Ella George	ALP	15.9%
Kalkallo	Ros Spence	ALP	16.5%
Dandenong	Gabrielle Williams	ALP	18.3%
Laverton	Sarah Connolly	ALP	18.4%

Liberal/National seats (28)
Seat	Member	Party	Margin
Marginal
Mornington	Chris Crewther	LIB	0.7% v IND
Benambra	Bill Tilley	LIB	0.9% v IND
Mildura	Jade Benham	NAT	1.2% v IND
Croydon	David Hodgett	LIB	1.4%
Hawthorn	John Pesutto	LIB	1.7%
Polwarth	Richard Riordan	LIB	1.8%
Caulfield	David Southwick	LIB	2.1%
Rowville	Kim Wells	LIB	3.7%
Kew	Jess Wilson	LIB	4.0%
Warrandyte	Ryan Smith	LIB	4.3%
Morwell	Martin Cameron	NAT	4.4%
Berwick	Brad Battin	LIB	4.7%
Sandringham	Brad Rowswell	LIB	5.0%
Brighton	James Newbury	LIB	5.1%
Evelyn	Bridget Vallence	LIB	5.4%
Bulleen	Matthew Guy	LIB	5.9%
Fairly safe
Nepean	Sam Groth	LIB	6.4%
Shepparton	Kim O'Keeffe	NAT	6.8% v IND
Eildon	Cindy McLeish	LIB	7.0%
South-West Coast	Roma Britnell	LIB	8.0%
Malvern	Michael O'Brien	LIB	8.1%
Euroa	Annabelle Cleeland	NAT	9.9%
Safe
Narracan (Note: Due to the sudden death of Nationals candidate Shaun Gilchrist, the election in Narracan was deferred, and a supplementary election was instead held on 28 January 2023.)	Wayne Farnham	LIB	13.0% v IND
Gippsland South	Danny O'Brien	NAT	15.6%
Ovens Valley	Tim McCurdy	NAT	17.8%
Very safe
Lowan	Emma Kealy	NAT	21.6%
Murray Plains	Peter Walsh	NAT	23.4%
Gippsland East	Tim Bull	NAT	24.6%

Crossbench seats (4)
Seat	Member	Party	Margin
Fairly safe
Richmond	Gabrielle de Vietri	GRN	7.3% v ALP
Safe
Melbourne	Ellen Sandell	GRN	10.2% v ALP
Prahran	Sam Hibbins	GRN	12.0% v LIB
Brunswick	Tim Read	GRN	13.7% v ALP
