= Candidates of the 2026 Victorian state election =

This is a list of the candidates of the 2026 Victorian state election.

There are 734 Legislative Assembly candidates, down from a total of 740 in 2022. The 303 candidates for the Legislative Council was the lowest number since the 2010 election.

== Retiring MPs ==
The following members announced that they will not be contesting the 2026 election:

=== Labor ===
- Jackson Taylor MLA (Bayswater) – announced 23 September 2025
- Steve McGhie MLA (Melton) – announced 23 September 2025
- Emma Vulin MLA (Pakenham) – announced 30 September 2025
- Jordan Crugnale MLA (Bass) – announced 2 October 2025
- Natalie Hutchins MLA (Sydenham) – announced 16 October 2025
- Shaun Leane MLC (North-Eastern Metropolitan Region) – announced 1 December 2025
- Danny Pearson MLA (Essendon) – announced 10 April 2026
- Mary-Anne Thomas MLA (Macedon) – announced 10 April 2026
- Gayle Tierney MLC (Western Victoria Region) – announced 10 April 2026
- Lily D'Ambrosio MLA (Mill Park) – announced 30 July 2026
- Harriet Shing MLC (Eastern Victoria Region) – announced 30 July 2026
- Jacinta Allan, MLA (Bendigo East) – announced 14 August 2026
- Maree Edwards MLA (Bendigo West) – announced 27 August 2026
- Sonja Terpstra MLC (North-Eastern Metropolitan Region) – announced 12 October 2026

=== Liberal ===
- Bill Tilley MLA (Benambra) – announced 13 March 2024
- David Hodgett MLA (Croydon) – announced 6 August 2025
- Michael O'Brien MLA (Malvern) – announced 9 September 2025
- Kim Wells MLA (Rowville) – announced 14 September 2025
- Wendy Lovell MLC (Northern Victoria Region) – announced 5 January 2026
- Joe McCracken MLC (Western Victoria Region) – announced 12 January 2026

=== National ===
- Peter Walsh MLA (Murray Plains) – announced 26 November 2024
- Tim Bull MLA (Gippsland East) – announced 19 May 2026
- Kim O'Keeffe MLA (Shepparton) – announced 21 July 2026

=== Greens ===
- Tim Read † MLA (Brunswick) – announced 29 January 2026 (died 19 September 2026)

=== Legalise Cannabis ===
- David Ettershank MLC (Western Metropolitan Region) – announced 2 June 2026

== Legislative Assembly ==
Sitting members are shown in bold text. Successful candidates are highlighted in the relevant colour. Coalition candidates are denoted with (L) for Liberal Party and (N) for National Party.

Electorate	Held by	Labor candidate	Coalition candidate	Greens candidate	One Nation candidate	Socialists candidate	Other candidates
Albert Park	Labor	**Nina Taylor**	Andrew Cook (L)	Sonya Semmens	Tammy Lindrum	Colleen Bolger	Georgie Dragwidge (Ind); Adrian King (Ind)
Ashwood	Labor	**Matt Fregon**	Theo Zographos (L)	Tim Randall	Steven Mitchell	Jacob van der Eynden	Hitendra Joshi (Ind); Enid Uwimana (FF)
Bass	Labor	Chris Buckingham	Rochelle Halstead (L)	Sophie Thorn	Nikole Schellekens	Chris Jobe	Ben Cauneac (FF)
Bayswater	Labor	Julie Buxton	David Kitchen (L)	Jess Kennedy	Kayte Bleakney	Alec Ferguson	Mathew Clarke (Ind); Gary Coombs (FF); Naomi Hubbard (DLP)
Bellarine	Labor	**Alison Marchant**	Callum Whitehead (L)	Mitch Pope	Ross McRae	Ronan Keogh	Kate Lockhart (Ind); Guy Manuell (FF); Dom Williams (SA)
Benambra	Liberal	Ollie Young	Steve Martin (L)	Graham Parton	Kellie Sheppard	Alex Vangalen	Lachie McKeeman (Ind); Mike Fruery (AJP); Tim Quilty (LBT); Evette Pepper (FF)
Bendigo East	Labor	Tim Rickwood	Andrew Lethlean (N)	Michael Tolhurst	Cheryl Hawken	Denali Norsen	Bonnie Dunn (AJP); Kristie Hoskins (Ind); Des John (FF); Liz Wright (Ind)
Bendigo West	Labor	Brenton Baldwin	David Hutchings (N)	Liza Shaw	Ellen Morgan	Tayne Shalevski	Christos Harisopoulos (FF) (Note: Disendorsed); Debra Tanter (AJP)
Bentleigh	Labor	**Nick Staikos**	Tynan Putt (L)	Claire Proctor	Herbert Lonsing	Liam Kruger	Tony Vainoras (ACP)
Berwick	Liberal	Rana Khan	**Brad Battin** (L)	Roshan De Silva	Michael Piastrino	Nalinda Amarasiri Gunawardana	Scott Dowling (ACP); Vincenzo De Paolis (FF); David John (Ind); Ethelyn King (LBT)
Box Hill	Labor	**Paul Hamer**	Sally Houguet (L)	Aaron Qin	Jamie Baker	Saravina Afaj	Heena Sinha Cheung (Ind); Peter Fagg (FF); Sue-Ellen McGrath (DLP)
Brighton	Liberal	Bridget Mullahy	**James Newbury** (L)	Ebony Bain	Alexander Fagan	Jessica Smith	John Casley (Ind); Anthony Hain (LBT); Barry Vincent (FF)
Broadmeadows	Labor	**Kathleen Matthews-Ward**	Baris Duzova (L)	Maryam Nasim	Ethan Keirs	Mutullah Can Yolbulan	Sue Bolton (SA); Mohamad El Youssef (Ind); Mohamad Elmustapha (Ind); Rachel Unicomb (AJP); Russell Wilson (FF)
Brunswick	Greens	Gabriel Steger	John Margelis (L)	Adam Pulford	Adam Helman	Naomi Farmer	Jack Amanatidis (Ind); India Rose (AJP); Mel Yuan (Ind)
Bulleen	Liberal	Tim Dale	**Matthew Guy** (L)	Tomas Lightbody	Mahdi Athari	Dimitrios Tafidis	Bradley Harvey (FF); Amanda Palioura (Ind); Greg Rublee (Ind)
Bundoora	Labor	**Colin Brooks**	Chris Parr (L)	Nina Laitala	Bruce Whalley	Sagar Sanyal	Melissa Murphy-Webster (Ind); Chloe Nicolosi (AJP); Rae Rancie (FF)
Carrum	Labor	**Sonya Kilkenny**	Jeff Shelley (L)	Zoe Pegrum	Joshua Mathews	Reema Ababneh	Harley MacKenzie (Cannabis); Carolyn Moore(AJP); Trevor Smith (LBT)
Caulfield	Liberal	Mikaela Stafrace	**David Southwick** (L)	Angel Dolejsí	Michael Abelman	Malak Ababneh	Geneviève Gilbert (FF); Kovi Shroot (Ind)
Clarinda	Labor	**Meng Heang Tak**	John Paganis (L)	Conor Boyd-Eedle	Gavin Bain	Kit Message	Liam Roche (LBT); Caroline White (Ind)
Cranbourne	Labor	**Pauline Richards**	Gino Tripodi (L)	Annalise Mercer	Andrew Hirst	Reem Yunis	Craig Baird (LBT); Shane Foreman (FF); Liam Urquiola (Cannabis)
Croydon	Liberal	Richard Farr	Toby Wooldridge (L)	Lini Fernando	Glenn Brindley	Beth Grimshaw	Nathan Schwab (LBT); Nofoao Thomas (FF); David Vanderwolf (Ind)
Dandenong	Labor	**Gabrielle Williams**	William Billings (L)	Catherine D'Arcy	Glenda Wright	Jack McMahon	Jordan Forte (LBT); Jacqueline Harvey (FF); Arshad Ali Khan (Ind)
Eildon	Liberal	Kevin Gibson	**Cindy McLeish** (L)	Talia Gulpilil	Tim Barber	Dylan Little	Chloe Bond (AJP); Joshua Mosely (FF); Tom Ward (Ind)
Eltham	Labor	**Vicki Ward**	Paul Byrnes (L)	Rachel Busbridge	Jessie Weatherly	Maeve Riches	Louise Brooskby (AJP); Steven Marasea (LBT)
Essendon	Labor	Katerine Theodosis	Tommy Le Deux (L)	James Williams	John Barnes	Michal Kedem	Ava Adams (Ind); Anab Mohamud (Ind); Oscar Yildiz (Ind)
Eureka	Labor	**Michaela Settle**	Emma Muir (L)	Sam McColl	Paul Ballinger	Andy Raven	Wendy Morrison (AJP); Ian Harkness (FF); Steven Vendetti-Taylor (Ind); Belinda Zivkovic (Ind)
Euroa	National	Julian Kelly	**Annabelle Cleeland** (N)	Alysia Regan	Steve Campbell	Zoe Lyle	Karina Kelly (AJP); Moussa Taouk (FF)
Evelyn	Liberal	Analise Sherlock	**Bridget Vallence** (L)	Andrew Henley	Daniel Killey	James Scanlon	Jan Heald (AJP); Michelle O'Brien (FF)
Footscray	Labor	**Katie Hall**	Tim Chang (L)	Elena Pereyra	Alexander Lopez	Jasmine Duff	Daryl Calder (CAN); Catherine Cumming (Ind); Hai Dinh (Ind); Andualem Felate (TR); Ana Flores (FF); Kristina Hess (ATF); Marcus Ibrahim (Ind); Daniel Lewis (FP); Minh Quan Nguyen (West); Jess Marsh (Ind)
Frankston	Labor	**Paul Edbrooke**	Bree Ambry (L)	Katie Goulas	Paul Stafford	Andrew Cheeseman	Chrysten Abraham (Ind); Nicola Barry (Ind); Julie Harman (AJP); Henry Kelsall (Ind); Jeffrey Knipe (Cannabis)
Geelong	Labor	**Christine Couzens**	Andy Pobjoy (L)	Emilie Flynn	John De Lorenzo	Bree Vanderpol	Maria Bengtsson (FF); Brenden Grull (SA); Pippa McPherson (AJP)
Gippsland East	National	Sonny Stephens	Gemma Rendell (N)	Ash Munro	Steve Goodman	Amy Espeseth	Ricky Muir (SFF); Alison Waters (FF)
Gippsland South	National	Amy Barry-Macaulay	**Danny O'Brien** (N)	Zave Evans	Bianca Wilke	Lachie McGennisken	Jessica McAuliffe (AJP); Phillip Schuhmann (Ind)
Glen Waverley	Labor	**John Mullahy**	Jacky Sun (L)	Toyo White	Brad Cox	Nicholas Siow	Anna Dobie (FF); Segar Nadarajah (DLP)
Greenvale	Labor	**Iwan Walters**	Jim Overend (L)	Declan McGinness	Chris Moore	Kirill Smelov	Rosanna Furina (AJP); Mazen John (ACP); Hassan Said (Ind); Michael Titheridge (FF); Yehya Zoughaib (Ind)
Hastings	Labor	**Paul Mercurio**	Frank Schiefler (L)	Isaac Willoughby	Peter Angelico	Michael Denman	Chloe Coulson (AJP); Jason Smart (Ind)
Hawthorn	Liberal	Clive Crosby	**John Pesutto** (L)	Kylie Rocha	Paul Pribilovics	Tess McEnearney	Shima Ibuki (Ind); Adam Nicoll (FF)
Ivanhoe	Labor	**Anthony Carbines**	Oscar Lopez (L)	Nina Crawley	Wayne Hutchins	Ben Milne	Dora Bergman (Ind); Ren Casonato (FF); Michelle Kennedy (Ind)
Kalkallo	Labor	**Ros Spence**	Eddie Dadisho (L)	Payal Tiwari	Troy Steans	Courtney Millett	Jeanette Dobson (FF); Rebecca Islam (Ind); Matthew Lynch (AJP)
Kew	Liberal	David Sun	**Jess Wilson** (L)	Jackie Carter	David Laird	Samantha Lincolne	Finlay Davis (Ind); Juliet Hales (AJP); Man Liang (Ind); Sophie Torney (Ind); Ann Seeley (FF)
Kororoit	Labor	**Luba Grigorovitch**	Jack Chakoma (L)	Joyce McDonald	Seva Melnikov	Rayan Hassan	Vasundhara Kandpal (AJP); Nick Patterson (FF); Divya Padi (TR); Donna Southern (West)
Lara	Labor	**Ella George**	Tim Beddoe (L)	Theresa Slater	Stephen Spyros	Oliver Randall	Sarah Hathway (SA); Samantha Long (AJP); Tina Uwizeyimana (FF)
Laverton	Labor	**Sarah Connolly**	Ghada Noune (L)	Lucy Nguyen	Rufo Paredes	Van Thanh Rudd	Jo Garcia (FF); Suchithra Chittedi (TR); Shohre Mansouri (AJP); Emma Mendelsohn (West)
Lowan	National	Sue Pavlovich	**Emma Kealy** (N)	Jeff Moran	Andrew Partridge	Jos Downey	Kieran Butler (Ind); Lee Ann Elms (FF); Karen Hyslop (AD)
Macedon	Labor	Annette Death	Kate Kendall (L)	Marley McRae McLeod	Damien Parolin	Catherine Wilson	Bernadette Mayne (FF); Natalie Korinfsky (AJP); Michael Seton (Ind); Dom Bonanno (Ind)
Malvern	Liberal	Peter Martin	Amelia Hamer (L)	Georgia Katsikis	Edward Bode	Gavin Leonard	Christina Zigouras (Ind); David Segal (LBT)
Melbourne	Greens	Davydd Griffiths	Rafael Camillo (L)	**Ellen Sandell**	Phillip Courtis	Jordan van den Lamb	Naomi Jones (AJP); Rob McCathie (LBT); Rowan Tuckfield (Ind); Mohamed Yusuf (Ind)
Melton	Labor	Broden Borg	Jarrod Bingham (L)	Veronika Levchenkova	Matthew Katselis	Daire Kelly	Fiona Adin-Jones (AJP); Marlene West (FF); Hayden Legro (West); M.D. Omar Faruq (Ind); Jason Fraser (Ind); Jason Perera (Ind)
Mildura	National	Stella Zigouras	**Jade Benham** (N)	Katie Clements	Guy Cooper	Renee Nayef	Vanessa Fries (AJP); Joselyn Ntahomvukiye (FF)
Mill Park	Labor	Elizabeth Nealy	Joel Drysdale (L)	Binoy Zacharias	Arthur Tsoutsoulis	Jesse Lambourn	Kath van der End (FF); Eve Levens (AJP); Aidan McLindon (Ind)
Monbulk	Labor	**Daniela De Martino**	Clare Fitzmaurice (L)	Merran Blair	Adrian Dowell	Noah Briggs	Alyssa Wormald (AJP); Craig Manners (FF)
Mordialloc	Labor	**Tim Richardson**	Paul O'Halloran (L)	Alex Breskin	Nadia Ticehurst	Mahee Hossain	Lily Potucek (FF); Renee Thompson (Cannabis); Rachel Versteegen (LBT)
Mornington	Liberal	Kerry Macdonald	**Chris Crewther** (L)	Kai Titcher	Ashli Beards	Gene Brownlie	Adrian Maher (Ind); Melissa Goffin (Ind)
Morwell	National	Tracie Lund	**Martin Cameron** (N)	Rochelle Hine	Casey Murphy	Natalie Acreman	Brendan Clarke (FF); Ross McPhee (DLP)
Mulgrave	Labor	**Eden Foster**	Charles Tran (L)	Paul Schofield	Cody Rebbechi	Connor Buchanan	Ian Cook (Ind); Stewart Dobrzynski (FF); Fotini Theodossopoulou (LBT)
Murray Plains	National	Christine Grundy	Brett Hosking (N)	Zoe Cook	Garner Smith	Asyiqin Sanif	Peita Collard (AJP); Ewan McDonald (FF)
Narracan	Liberal	Jannette Langley	**Wayne Farnham** (L)	Alyssa Weaver	Ben Lucas	Moss Page	Geoff Dethlefs (FF)
Narre Warren North	Labor	**Belinda Wilson**	Shemane Nathanielsz (L)	Hayley Perry	Sebastian Crutchfield	Lachlan McCracken	Cristina Emmanuel (FF); Martin Leahy (Cannabis); Joshua Utoyo (LBT)
Narre Warren South	Labor	Stefan Koomen	Norliah Peterson (L)	Jill Nambu	Trevor Hammond	Bailey McCracken	Alan Currie (FF); Scott Watson (Ind); Lydia Denker (LBT)
Nepean	Liberal	Surbhi Snowball	**Anthony Marsh** (L)	Sianan Healy	Darren Hercus	Seth Willcocks	Mike Brown (FF); Kim Robbins (Ind); Joseph Toscano (Ind)
Niddrie	Labor	**Ben Carroll**	Samantha Byrne (L)	Lana Nguyen	Jason Taverna	Brendan Laws	Karthik Chittedi (TR); Domenic Mete (DLP); Brett Patrikeos (West); Salomae Haselgrove (AJP); Sam Sfameni (Ind)
Northcote	Labor	**Kat Theophanous**	Lynda Awad (L)	Campbell Gome	Christopher Bradbury	Kath Larkin	Richard Cimbaro (FF); Ian Hillman (Ind); Hannah Kafel (FP); Jim Penman (LBT); Clive Piller (ATF)
Oakleigh	Labor	**Steve Dimopoulos**	Martin Jung (L)	Hsiang-Han Hsieh	Brooke Carter	Rowdy Bugter	Matthew Grinter (FF)
Ovens Valley	National	Jennifer Smith	**Tim McCurdy** (N)	Ben Gilbert	James Rouel	Bronwyn Murphy	Steve Manning (Ind); Julian Fidge (LBT); Sue Litchfield (AJP); Carol Norton-Smith (FF)
Pakenham	Labor	Alessandra Soliven	Radmila Dyson (L)	Nasser Yawari	Warren Pickering	Stephanie Grigg	Stephanie Davies (Ind); Raymond French (Ind); Jesse Hamalainen (DLP); Kate Hands (LBT); Lucas Ogden (Ind)
Pascoe Vale	Labor	**Anthony Cianflone**	Rohit Taggar (L)	Angelica Panopoulos	Andrew Forehan	Yasemin Shamsili	Jacob Andrewartha (SA); Kathrine Ashton (FF); Kerry Haupt (ATF); Amanda Hickey (FP); Stuart Lawrence (Climate)
Point Cook	Labor	**Mathew Hilakari**	Raja Reddy (L)	Ponraj Krishna Pandi	Cameron Reid	Taylor Laine	Kirti Alle (TR); Mark Grech (West); Paul Kelly (DLP); Keith Meure (FF)
Polwarth	Liberal	Hutch Hussein	**Richard Riordan** (L)	Jesse Holden	Anna Malcolm	Lula Tolley	Brenton Carbins (ACP); Vincent Colla (FF)
Prahran	Liberal	Meghan Hopper	**Rachel Westaway** (L)	Angelica Di Camillo	Shaun Virsu	Clayton Doueihi	Max Dicks (Ind); Tosh-Jake Finnigan (Ind); Morgan Jonas (SV-VCP); Daniel Jones (FP); Alan Menadue (Ind); Daniel O'Neill (AJP); Nicholas Wong (Climate)
Preston	Labor	**Nathan Lambert**	Hamza Al Katranji (L)	Loki Sangarya	Franco Guardiani	Serena Ashmore	Mark Bryant (FP); Peita Collard (AJP); Zheng Chin (Ind); Tim Date (ATF); Simon Dower (Climate); Will Fowles (Ind); Julio Valencia (FF)
Richmond	Greens	Sarah McKenzie	Charles Aponso (L)	**Gabrielle de Vietri**	Harrison Rindfleish	Chris Dite	David Meyer (Ind); Bernadette Gray (LBT); Christine Maynard (Ind); Jack Pead (AD)
Ringwood	Independent	Rachel Halse	Nick McGowan (L)	Amy Mills	John O'Connor	Jack Gardner	Prue Cutts (Ind); Elaine Huang (FF); Christopher Norton (DLP); Lyndon Walker (AJP)
Ripon	Labor	**Martha Haylett**	Jo Armstrong (N); Megan Read (L)	Tim Drylie	Donna Buxton	Taylah Brennan-Jones	Trevor Andrei (Ind); Jeff Barry (LBT); Mark McGrath (FF); Bernard Quince (Ind); Ronald Skruzny (DLP); Krzysztof Wojtowski (SFF)
Rowville	Liberal	Muhammad Shahbaz	Max Williams (L)	Dave Massey	Bradley Watt	Lars Hiemstra	Fiona Dobrzynski (FF); Scott Robson (LBT)
Sandringham	Liberal	Anastasia Sagris-Desmond	**Brad Rowswell** (L)	Timon Fotakis	Anthony Blight	Lauren Stevenson	
Shepparton	National	Cayla Fin	Shane Sali (N)	Grace Verney	Phillip Bryant	Karen Hocking	Lou Costa (Ind); Faith Murphy-Ginger (AJP); Johnson Varkey (Ind); Alison White (FF)
South Barwon	Independent	Rebecca Thistleton	Libby Pettit (L)	Izzy Scherrer	Josh Geard	Madilyn Gorman	Alan Barron (FF); Freya Hedley (SA); Ron Nelson (Ind)
South-West Coast	Liberal	Andrew Govanstone	**Roma Britnell** (L)	Silver Rose	Richard Hughes	Hera Sheppard	Tamhas Buchan (FF)
St Albans	Labor	**Natalie Suleyman**	Rob Dunstan (L)	Bao Huynh	John Cowell	Leanna Nguyen	Alex Hakizimana (FF); Kerry Janten (Ind); Davinder Kaur (TR); Luận Walker (West)
Sunbury	Labor	**Josh Bull**	Simmone Cottom (L)	Lauren Granger-Brown	Elita Dabrowski	Adam Bremner	Elmer Batres (FF); Bhaskar Reddy Bethi (TR); Steve Medcraft (Ind); John Stafford (DLP); Geoff Vine (West)
Sydenham	Labor	Uros Rasic	Nathalie Moussi (L)	Maggie Jane	Joh Bauch	Shania Khan	Maria Kerr (Ind); Ashley Vandenburg (Ind); Bruce Lancashire (West); Nancy Croes (FF); Bruce Poon (AJP); Brandon Sinclair (DLP); Laxmi Kenderla (TR)
Tarneit	Labor	**Dylan Wight**	Venkat Ram Upparlapalle (L)	Rifai Raheem	Walter Villagonzalo	Leah Van Koulen	Rahima Ahmed (Ind); S.M. Zaberul Islam (Ind); Aijaz Moinuddin (Ind); Horizana Niyongbaire (FF); Andrew Elsbury (West); Maurita Rahn (AJP); Sindhu Sudhagani (TR)
Thomastown	Labor	**Bronwyn Halfpenny**	Belinda Stojcevski (L)	Gavin Trewalla	Nadia Anthony	Priya Reddy	Rob Rancie (FF)
Warrandyte	Liberal	Rebecca Paterson	**Nicole Werner** (L)	Vanessa Muradian	Mark Burnside	John Stanley	Caleb Schwab (LBT)
Wendouree	Labor	**Juliana Addison**	Gav Ronan (L)	Ellen Burns	Stuart Robinson	Chris Meagher	Melissa Collins (AJP); Ruth Byrne (FF)
Werribee	Labor	**John Lister**	Reece Clark (L)	Tushar Kumar	Paul Pateras	Sue Munro	Paul Hopper (West); Matthew Emerson (FF); Sandhya Kayugarla (TR); Jeremy Orchard (DLP); Monica Raizada (Ind)
Williamstown	Labor	**Melissa Horne**	Paul Lindemann (L)	Ben Hocking	Catherine Loughnan	Oskar Martin	Gill Gannon (West); Tony Briffa (Ind); Bruce O'Regan (FF); Sagar Reddy Yarra (TR)
Yan Yean	Labor	**Lauren Kathage**	Amanda Dow (L)	Gufran Mohammed	Jeremy Johnson	Andrew Bell	Troy Cheers (LBT); Sinan Okatan (AJP); James Hall (FF)

== Legislative Council ==
Sitting members are shown in bold text. Tickets that elected at least one MLC are highlighted in the relevant colour. Successful candidates are identified by an asterisk (*).

=== Eastern Victoria ===
The Labor Party is defending two seats. The Liberal/National Coalition is defending two seats. The Shooters, Fishers and Farmers Party are defending one seat.

Labor candidates	Coalition candidates	Greens candidates	Legalise Cannabis candidates	DLP candidates	One Nation candidates
1. Enver Erdogan; 2. Leticia Quintana; 3. Denise Ryan; 4. Ian Rogers; 5. Ryan Mather	1. **Renee Heath**; 2. **Melina Bath**; 3. Matt Green; 4. Barry Besanko; 5. Richard Clark	1. Mat Morgan; 2. Xero Turnbull; 3. Oliver Jobe; 4. Helen Chauhan; 5. Phillip Watt	1. Danielle Burridge; 2. Devon Starbuck	1. Khalif White; 2. Daniel Hamman	1. Clay Esler; 2. Neil Davison; 3. John De Wacht
SFF candidates	AJP candidates	Socialists candidates	Sustainable candidates	Independent candidates	
1. **Jeff Bourman**; 2. Kerrie-Anne Muir	1. Helen Jeges; 2. Philip Waters	1. Max Forward; 2. Dylan Edwards	1. Reade Smith; 2. Inge Meldgaard	1. Ant Pitt; 2. Kate Coxall	

=== North Eastern Metropolitan ===
The Labor Party is defending two seats. The Liberal Party is defending two seats. The Victorian Greens are defending one seat.

Labor candidates	Liberal candidates	Greens candidates	DLP candidates	Libertarian candidates	Legalise Cannabis candidates
1. Ryan Batchelor; 2. James Gan; 3. Rana Javed; 4. Donna MacKinnon; 5. Maree Simmons	1. **Richard Welch**; 2. Deirdre Diamante; 3. John Pyrros; 4. Sue Leidler; 5. David Solly	1. **Aiv Puglielli**; 2. Sophia Sun; 3. Peter Gallagher; 4. Mohamud Hersi; 5. Liezl Shnookal	1. Cary De Wit; 2. Brenton Van Der Ende; 3. Peter Plaucs; 4. Jae Ho Hwang	1. Matthew Ford; 2. David Schwab	1. Gianni Del Rosario-Makridis; 2. Thomas Forrest
Family First candidates	One Nation candidates	Socialists candidates	Sustainable candidates	Democrats candidates	Independent candidates
1. Alex van der End; 2. Jeremy Ngoh	1. Natalie Adams; 2. Maxwell Gratton; 3. Kane Afford	1. Lucas Deviesseux; 2. Heather Maltby	1. Jack Corcoran; 2. William Clow	1. Leonie Green; 2. Ryan Parris	1. Wai Man Raymond Chow; 2. Yeung Yee Big Lily Chow

=== Northern Metropolitan ===
The Labor Party are defending two seats. The Liberal Party are defending one seat. The Greens are defending one seat. The Democratic Labour Party are nominally defending one seat, but incumbent MP Adem Somyurek has left the party to become an independent.

Labor candidates	Liberal candidates	Greens candidates	DLP candidates	Socialists candidates	Legalise Cannabis candidates
1. **Sheena Watt**; 2. Tom McIntosh; 3. Sainab Sheikh; 4. Praveen Komaragiri; 5. Dan Cairnes	1. **Evan Mulholland**; 2. Bernadette Khoury; 3. Shankar Dharel; 4. Usman Ghani; 5. Mark Briers	1. **Anasina Gray-Barberio**; 2. Sam Drummond; 3. Tara Burnett; 4. Hannah Thomas; 5. Tim Sheehan	1. John Kavanagh; 2. James Fung	1. Omar Hassan; 2. Louisa Bassini; 3. Catherine Robertson; 4. Belle Gibson; 5. Bella Beiraghi	1. Riley Aickin; 2. King River Wind
Family First candidates	One Nation candidates	Sustainable candidates	Democrats candidates	Socialist Alliance candidates	Unlabelled SEP candidates
1. Imad Hirmiz; 2. Andrew Deeming	1. Mark Nicholson; 2. Anna Galluzzo	1. Bert Jessup; 2. Beth Couch; 3. Daryl Bludgeon	1. Andrew Rowse; 2. Sahar Khalili	1. Meredith Lawrence; 2. Chloe Beaton; 3. Darren Saffin	1. Morgan Peach; 2. Peter Byrne
Unnamed Group 2 candidates	Ungrouped independents				
1. Bassima Hawli; 2. Anastasia Drapaniotis; 3. Abir Dandach; 4. Selin Gungormus	Peter Razos				

=== Northern Victoria ===
The Labor Party are defending one seat. The Liberal/National Coalition is defending two seats. One Nation are defending one seat. The Animal Justice Party are defending one seat.

Coalition candidates	Labor candidates	Greens candidates	SFF candidates	Legalise Cannabis candidates	One Nation candidates
1. Steve Brooks; 2. **Gaelle Broad**; 3. Amanda Millar; 4. Chad Muller; 5. Brad Hearn	1. **Jaclyn Symes**; 2. Jana Sarantis; 3. Mitch Bridges; 4. Natasha Gayfer; 5. Greg Olsen	1. Cate Sinclair; 2. Lucas Maddock; 3. Wil Mikelsons; 4. Helen Robinson; 5. Samantha Bright	1. Ethan Constantinou; 2. Geoff Ashby	1. Wayne Taylor; 2. Scott Williams	1. **Rikkie-Lee Tyrrell**; 2. Athol Thomas; 3. Luke Sorenson
Family First candidates	AJP candidates	DLP candidates	Socialists candidates	Sustainable candidates	Citizens Party candidates
1. Chris McCormack; 2. Ev Keetelaar	1. **Georgie Purcell**; 2. Laurie Levy	1. Chai Van Dorssen; 2. Sophie De Wit	1. Dorothy Lamond; 2. Rohan Tyler	1. Paul Read; 2. Cheryl Blacker	1. Chris Lahy; 2. Jeff Davy
Unnamed Group 1 candidates	Ungrouped independent				
1. Kate White; 2. Alex Green	Nick McHugh				

=== South Eastern Metropolitan ===
The Labor Party are defending two seats. The Liberal Party are defending one seat. Legalise Cannabis are defending one seat. The Libertarian Party are defending one seat.

Labor candidates	Liberal candidates	Greens candidates	Legalise Cannabis candidates	Libertarian candidates	DLP candidates
1. **Lee Tarlamis**; 2. **Michael Galea**; 3. Ram Moti; 4. Soheang Pak; 5. Thanh Von Tran	1. Phillip Pease; 2. **Ann-Marie Hermans**; 3. Scott Fenner; 4. Marcus Fernandez; 5. Salini Vipinkumar	1. Matthew Kirwan; 2. Louisa Willoughby; 3. Samantha von Hagt; 4. Cara Kent; 5. Jayden Hardy	1. **Rachel Payne**; 2. Gregory Denham	1. **David Limbrick**; 2. Will Vandermeer	1. Andrew Zmegac; 2. Scott Marsh
One Nation candidates	Socialists candidates	Sustainable candidates	Christian Alliance candidates	Citizens Party candidates	Democrats candidates
1. Colleen Harkin; 2. Geoff Goddard; 3. Leo Panetta	1. Kelly Cvetkova; 2. Keeley Hopper	1. Brandon Hoult; 2. Ann-Marie Brady	1. Milton Wilde; 2. Leanne Wilde	1. Gary Collie; 2. Russell Bennett	1. Heath McKenzie; 2. Jacqui Morel
Ungrouped independents
Susantha Abeysinghe

=== Southern Metropolitan ===
The Labor Party are defending two seats. The Liberal Party are defending two seats. The Greens are defending one seat.

Liberal candidates	Labor candidates	Greens candidates	Legalise Cannabis candidates	DLP candidates	Sustainable candidates
1. **David Davis**; 2. **Georgie Crozier**; 3. Xavier Boffa; 4. Jamie Bell; 5. Jasmine Perera	1. **John Berger**; 2. Louise Crawford; 3. Virginia Wills; 4. Gavin Douch; 5. Phillip Cole	1. **Katherine Copsey**; 2. Rachel Iampolski; 3. Jeff Kissubi; 4. Kim Samiotis; 5. Joshua Weaver	1. Zofia Pawlaczek; 2. Ben Howman	1. Karla Zmegac; 2. Paul Dean	1. Bettina Terry; 2. Linda Baird
Family First candidates	One Nation candidates	Socialists candidates	Democrats candidates	Independent candidates	
1. Jane Foreman; 2. Tom Paton	1. Aaron Sanford; 2. Kristina Kaulenas	1. Catherine Holder; 2. April Worsley	1. Clive Jackson; 2. Phillip Broadbridge	1. Melissa Lowe; 2. Jess Ness	

=== Western Metropolitan ===
The Labor Party is defending two seats. The Liberal Party is defending two seats. Legalise Cannabis are defending one seat.

Labor candidates	Liberal candidates	Greens candidates	DLP candidates	Legalise Cannabis candidates	Socialists candidates
1. **Lizzie Blandthorn**; 2. **Ingrid Stitt**; 3. Cuc Lam; 4. Sara Ibrahim; 5. Kim Travers	1. Roshena Campbell; 2. **Trung Luu**; 3. Satish Patel; 4. Shwetha Narayanan; 5. Daniel Maduok Geng	1. Brittney Henderson; 2. Isabella McRae McLeod; 3. Ebony Heins; 4. Niall Harden; 5. Geetha Pathanjalimanoharar	1. Mark Royal; 2. Arlene Smith	1. Xavier Menta; 2. Chana Berson	1. Anneke Demanuele; 2. Jorge Jorquera; 3. Ella Sjodin; 4. Lucy Kelly; 5. Dean Maloney
Family First candidates	One Nation candidates	Sustainable candidates	Democrats candidates	The Republican candidates	West Party candidates
1. **Moira Deeming**; 2. Chris Neil; 3. Pavitra Kulkarni; 4. Mark Emerson; 5. Francine Ikirezi	1. Fiona Lopez; 2. Alan Doensen	1. Dennis Bilic; 2. Susan Davies	1. Chris Thiery-Lai; 2. Nigel Keenan	1. Raj Saini; 2. Zalak Shar; 3. Kaur Sarajabit; 4. Shubhangi Kulkarni	1. Joe Garra; 2. Sahana Ramesh; 3. Phil Farrelly
Ungrouped independents
Rakesh Raizada

=== Western Victoria ===
The Labor Party is defending two seats. The Liberal/National Coalition is defending two seats. The Greens are defending one seat.

Labor candidates	Coalition candidates	Greens candidates	Legalise Cannabis candidates	SFF candidates	Libertarian candidates
1. Kate Maxfield; 2. **Jacinta Ermacora**; 3. Sam Anwari; 4. Kaitlyn Handreck; 5. Fiona Mackenzie	1. **Bev McArthur**; 2. Graham Watt; 3. Robert Letts; 4. Ellie Read; 5. Melody Steed	1. **Sarah Mansfield**; 2. Belinda Coats; 3. Steve Veale; 4. Aleisha Smith; 5. Heaven Van Asperen	1. Peter Mitchell; 2. Alice Davy	1. Ben Collyer; 2. Ken Vickers	1. Paul Barker; 2. Phill Schiemer
One Nation candidates	DLP candidates	Family First candidates	Socialists candidates	Sustainable candidates	Democrats candidates
1. Chris Burson; 2. Vaughan Williams; 3. Jason Oosthuizen	1. Costa Di Biase; 2. Jennifer Bowden	1. Dianne Colbert; 2. Anne Moloney; 3. Senthil Veerappagounder; 4. Brendan William Thomas	1. Ben Nunquam; 2. Dominique Houzet	1. Madeleine Wearne; 2. Ian Chivers	1. Andy Meddick; 2. Peter Kelly
The Republican candidates	Socialist Alliance candidates	Unnamed Group 1 candidate	Ungrouped independents		
1. Sindhu Sama; 2. Akwinder Kaur	1. Tim Gooden; 2. Sue Bull; 3. Ross Smith	1. Aleta Moriarty; 2. Timothy Denton	Eve Fisher		

== Resignations and disendorsements ==
Date	Party	Candidate	Seat	Details
December 2025	Liberal	Andrew Kilmartin	Ripon	Withdrew due to Huntington's disease diagnosis
3 January 2026	Family First	Bernie Finn	Western Metropolitan	Withdrew due to disagreements with party leadership
29 January 2026	Greens	Tim Read	Brunswick	Withdrew due to metastatic cancer diagnosis
20 March 2026	Liberal	Dinesh Gourisetty	Western Metropolitan	Withdrew due to controversy over providing a character reference for a child sex offender
16 July 2026	Socialist	Owen Cosgriff	Bendigo East	Withdrew due to a family illness
17 July 2026	Liberal	Moira Deeming	Western Metropolitan	Disendorsed after making unsubstantiated claims of assault against fellow MP Matthew Guy. Ran as a Family First candidate.
25 August 2026	Labor	Indah Johannes	Evelyn	Withdrew due to Hodgkin lymphoma diagnosis
1 October 2026	One Nation	Greg Hansford	Eastern Victoria	Withdrew due to health issues
12 October 2026	Liberal	Grant Hutchinson	Croydon	Disendorsed due to a legal dispute between the candidate and his law firm
31 October 2026	One Nation	Matthew Collins	Melbourne	Withdrew over controversial social media posts about sexual consent.
10 November 2026	One Nation	Franco Guardiani	Preston	Disendorsed over controversial social media posts about Adolf Hitler.
11 November 2026	Liberal	Paul Lindemann	Williamstown	Disendorsed over controversial social media posts about Indigenous Australians.
18 November 2026	Family First	Christos Harisopoulos	Bendigo West	Disendorsed over controversial blog posts
