= 2026 Victorian state election =

Election for the 61st Parliament of Victoria

- 28 November 2026

All 88 seats in the Legislative Assembly 45 seats needed for a majority All 40 seats in the Legislative Council
- Opinion polls

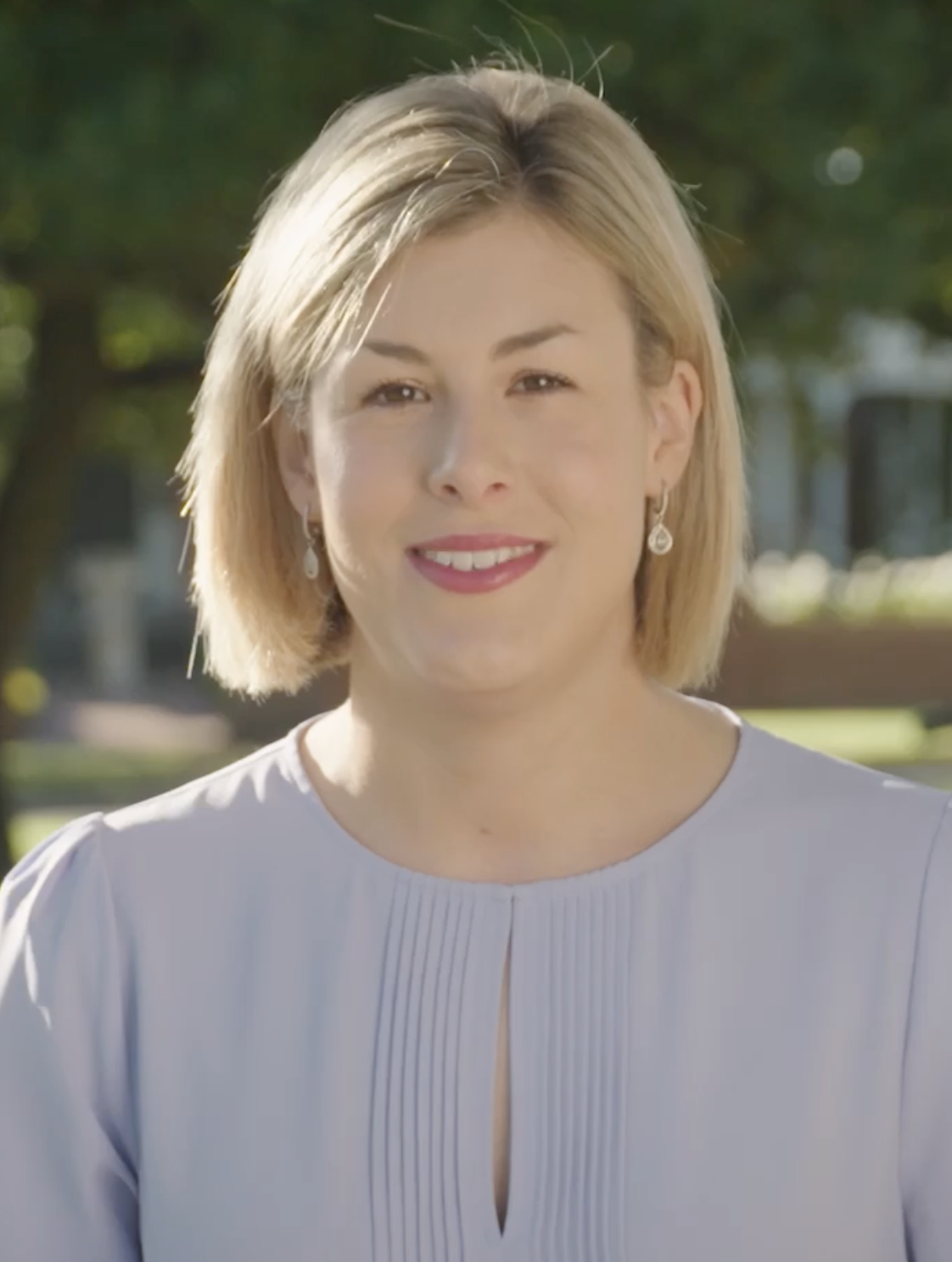

Leader	Ben Carroll	Jess Wilson	Ellen Sandell
Party	Labor	Coalition	Greens
Leader since	28 July 2026	18 November 2025	23 April 2024
Leader's seat	Niddrie	Kew	Melbourne
Last election	56 seats	28 seats (Note: The election for the District of Narracan was deferred. A supplementary election was held on 28 January 2023.)	4 seats
Current seats	54 (Note: Will Fowles and Darren Cheeseman have sat on the crossbench as Independent Labor MPs since 5 August 2023 and 29 April 2024 respectively.)	29 (Note: The Liberals gained the seat of Prahran at a by-election in 2025.)	2 (Note: The Greens lost the seat of Prahran to the Liberal Party at a by-election on 8 February 2025.; Tim Read, the member for Brunswick died on 19 September 2026.)
Seats needed	Steady	▲17	▲42
- Winning margin by electorate
Incumbent Premier
Ben Carroll
Labor

A general election is scheduled to be held on 28 November 2026 to elect members of the 61st Parliament of Victoria. All 88 seats in the Legislative Assembly and all 40 seats in the Legislative Council will be up for election.

The incumbent Labor government, led by Premier Ben Carroll, will seek to win a fourth consecutive four-year term against the opposition, the Liberal–National Coalition, led by Opposition Leader Jess Wilson. Other parties including One Nation, the Greens and independents will also participate in the election.

The election will be administered by the Victorian Electoral Commission (VEC).

== Background ==
=== Previous election and parliament ===
The Labor Party, led by Daniel Andrews, was elected into government at the 2014 election. Labor has been in government for all but one term since the 1999 election. Andrews' government was re-elected at the 2018 election and again at the 2022 election, winning 56 seats. The Liberal–National Coalition gained one seat to 28 seats, the Greens won 4 seats. In the Legislative Council, the Labor party won 15 of the 40 seats.

Andrews announced his resignation as premier and leader of the Labor Party on 26 September 2023, the resignation being formally effected the following day. This precipitated a leadership election within the Labor party-room, which was won unopposed by Deputy Premier Jacinta Allan following hours of intense negotiations between members of Labor's left and right factions. Allan, of the left, was elected leader, with right-faction member and Education Minister Ben Carroll as her deputy. Allan became the second female premier in the state's history, following Joan Kirner's 1990–1992 premiership. The government is seeking a fourth consecutive four-year term.

Following the Liberal/National Coalition's defeat, Opposition Leader and Liberal leader Matthew Guy announced in his post-election concession speech he would resign the leadership of the party. This ensured a leadership election was held for the position, at which newly elected member for Hawthorn John Pesutto defeated Brad Battin by one vote in a secret ballot of Liberal party-room MPs.

Over the course of the parliament's term, there was one January 2023 supplementary election in Narracan following the death of a candidate ahead of the state election, and five by-elections, namely the August 2023 Warrandyte by-election, the November 2023 Mulgrave by-election, the February 2025 Werribee and Prahran by-elections, and the May 2026 Nepean by-election. In only the seat of Prahran was there a change in party representation, with the Greens losing the seat to the Liberals, whilst in the four other districts the incumbent party retained the seat.

Aside from these by-elections, the Assembly's composition was altered by the removal of Will Fowles and Darren Cheeseman from the Labor caucus in October 2023 and April 2024 respectively, with both moving to the crossbench as "Independent Labor" MPs. The resignation of Sam Hibbins from the Greens on 1 November 2024 also resulted in him briefly sitting on the crossbench as an independent MP, until his resignation from the parliament later that month, causing the aforementioned by-election in Prahran.

On 27 December 2024, a leadership spill resulted in Brad Battin replacing Pesutto as Liberal leader and leader of the opposition. Pesutto's leadership came under intense pressure after a federal court judgement finding he defamed Liberal parliamentarian Moira Deeming and was ordered to pay $300,000 in damages. Battin's leadership lasted only eleven months, as he was defeated in another leadership spill, held on 18 November 2025, by Kew MP Jess Wilson. Media reporting quoted several Liberal MPs on background complaining about Battin's alleged lack of focus on issues other than Victoria's crime rates.

=== Rise of One Nation ===
By early 2026, the right-wing One Nation party's polling had risen considerably, with many national polls showing them on a higher vote than the Liberal Party. One Nation polled more votes than the Liberal Party at the 2026 South Australian state election, winning four seats to the Liberal Party's five. SA Labor meanwhile won in a landslide.

Liberal Party members have had differing views of how to counter the One Nation surge, with former Premier Jeff Kennett urging the party to form an 'anti-Labor partnership' with One Nation. Meanwhile, Victorian Liberal president Phil Davis has warned his party against chasing One Nation "to the fringe of Australian politics", publicly chastising Peta Credlin and other Liberal members from its conservative faction for running an agenda "through Sky News and News Corp newspapers to divide and remake the party."

=== Labor Party leadership change ===
In July 2026, a leadership election for the Victorian Labor Party occurred after weeks of poor opinion polling for the incumbent Allan government. Allan initially planned to contest the ballot. However, after Deputy Premier Ben Carroll announced that he would challenge Allan's leadership, Allan pulled out of the contest and resigned as Victorian Premier. Carroll was then elected unopposed Labor leader and the 50th Premier of Victoria.

== Key dates ==
In accordance with the timetable set out in the Electoral Act 2002, the terms of elected officials to Victoria's parliament are fixed to a four-year term, unless the Governor is advised to dissolve parliament. All elections since 2006 have occurred every four years on the last Saturday of November, in this instance falling on Saturday 28 November 2026.

The key dates in relation to this election are:

- 3 November 2026: Writs of election issued by the Governor. This has the effect of expiring both chambers of the parliament, meaning that there are no longer any members, the business of parliament ends until a new parliament is formed, and the government enters into a caretaker period.
- 3 November 2026: Electoral roll closed.
- 9 November 2026: Candidate nominations closed.
- 18 November 2026: Early voting commences.
- 28 November 2026: Election day.
- 19 December 2026: Final day for the writs to be returned.

== Electoral system ==
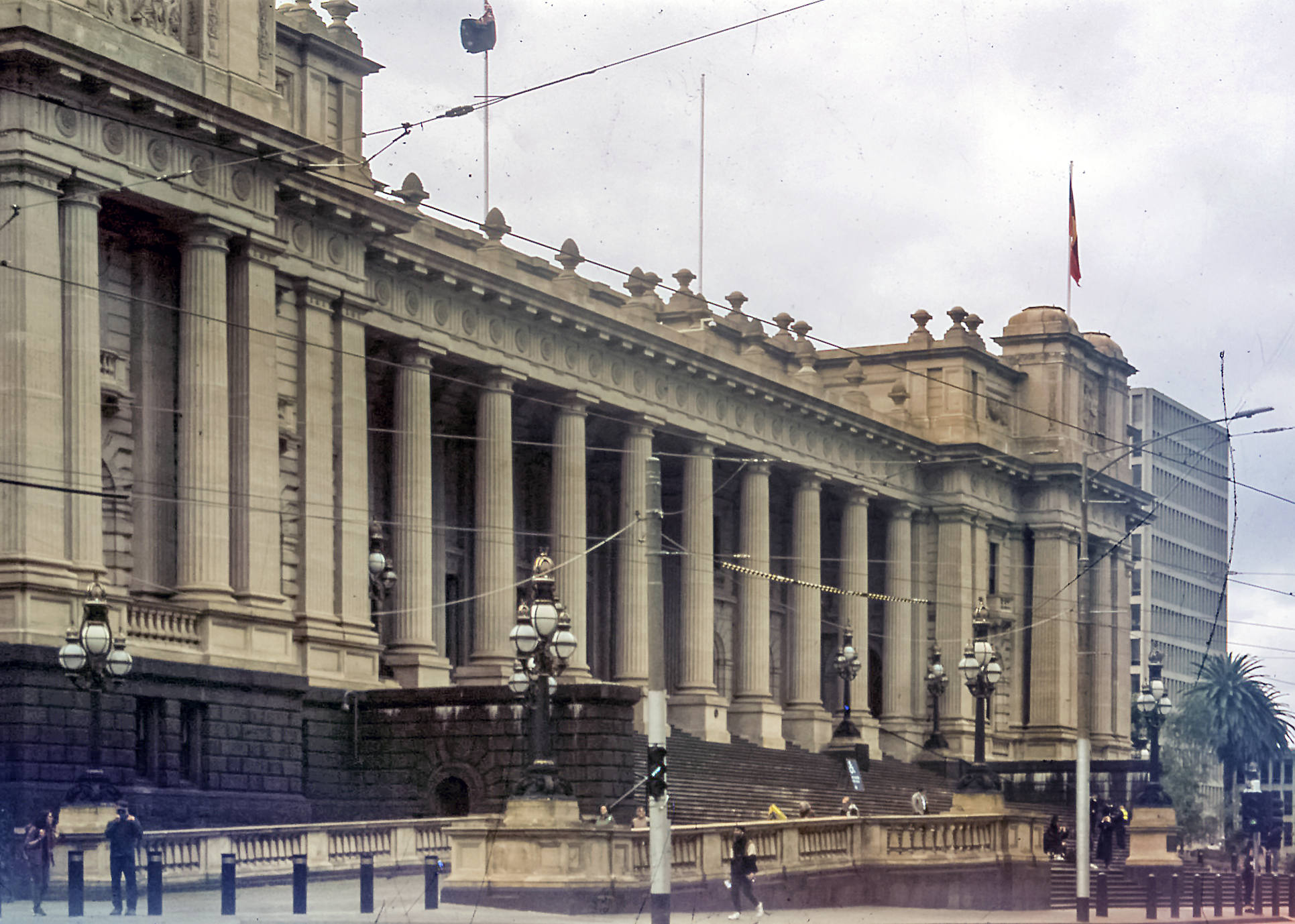
Parliament House, Melbourne which houses both the Legislative Assembly and Council chambers

Eligible Victorian electors are required to cast a ballot due to compulsory voting laws. The eligibility criteria for enrolment to vote includes being 18 years or older, an Australian citizen, and to have lived in Victoria for longer than a month.

=== Legislative Assembly ===
For the election of members to single seats of the Legislative Assembly, the Victorian Electoral Commission (VEC) uses full preferential voting where for a vote to count, it is required to number every box on the ballot in the order of the most preferred candidate for the particular electoral district an elector is registered to vote in. The election will cover all 88 Seats of the Victorian Legislative Assembly.

=== Legislative Council ===
In the Legislative Council, five members are elected from each of the state's eight electoral regions, ensuring a total of 40 members are elected to serve in the council. The eight regions each cover eleven lower house seats, resulting in uneven population distributions between the regions. At this election, a voter is required to vote either above the line for at least five parties or grouping of candidates in order of their preference; or vote below the line for at least five individual candidates in order of their preference. This creates a form of proportional representation, using the single transferable vote and optional preferential voting mechanisms.

==== Reforms to council's electoral system ====
Ahead of this election the parliament passed electoral reform legislation to change the electoral system for the Legislative Council. Under the former system that was first adopted for the 2006 state election, members were elected in one of the eight regions by electors who could vote either above the line or below the line, however above-the-line voters could only vote for only one party or grouping of candidates. Preferences were then automatically distributed based on the registered preference order provided to the VEC by the party-submitted group voting ticket. When voting below the line voters were required to number a minimum of five boxes on the ballot in order of preference.

By 2026, Victoria's upper house had become the last remaining state or territory legislative chamber to utilise these group voting tickets to automatically distribute voter's above-the-line preferences, with Western Australia abolishing the practice ahead of the 2025 state election. Victoria's system had led to election results in the upper house becoming unrepresentative of the actual votes received, with so-called 'preference whisperers' such as Glenn Druery organising ideologically disparate microparties to direct their preferences to each other, allowing candidates to be elected despite receiving less than 1% of the vote in some cases.

Attempts to reform the system to more closely reflect the system used for the Australian Senate and other state-based upper houses were rejected by former Premier Daniel Andrews, who described proponents of change as being "quite heavily motivated by wanting to get more of their people elected". Submissions to the post-2022 state election parliamentary inquiry calling for the abolition of the automatic above-the-line preference distributions eventually led to the parliament's Electoral Matters Committee (EMC) to examine the issue. Throughout 2025 the EMC oversaw an inquiry into reforming the electoral voting method for the Legislative Council. Any reform required the approval of both houses of parliament, whilst an alteration to the structure of the upper house, such as the number of members elected to the chamber or the eight regions from which they are elected, would require a vote at a state-wide referendum.

The EMC handed down its report in December 2025, recommending that group voting tickets be abolished and the "weighted inclusive Gregory method for surplus vote transfers" be adopted prior to the 2026 election. The committee further recommended a new process be established, involving either an expert panel, a citizens assembly or a constitutional convention, to consider changes to the electoral structure of the council which could be considered by voters at a referendum in 2028 or 2030.

The issue received renewed scrutiny in April 2026, when far-right commentator and former IDF soldier Avi Yemini announced his intention to set up the "Free Palestine" party in a bid to attract votes from left-wing voters and redirect preferences of votes the party receives to right-wing parties. Other fake parties such as Climate Action Now, registered by anti-lockdown and COVID-19 conspiracy theorist Monica Smit, and I'm Voting to Avoid the Fine, founded by her brother, were also registered ahead of the election with the intention to preference votes to parties such as One Nation and Family First.

The electoral commission responded by confirming it had no authority to prevent parties from adopting misleading names, and in June the commission began the process of registering "Free Palestine" as a political party. In July 2026 The Age reported that the Allan government was set to introduce legislation by the end of the month to abolish group voting tickets.

The government introduced the Electoral Amendment (Miscellaneous Matters) Bill 2026 to the parliament on 28 July. The bill required voters to number at least five boxes for parties above the line, in order of preference, or else number at least five boxes for individual candidates below the line. Like the system in place for the Senate, a savings provision is incorporated so as to enable voters who mark a clear 1 but fail to number their top five preferences clearly, to still have their vote counted as formal. The electoral commission is also tasked with publishing information about newly registered political parties, a response to Yemini and other's efforts to establish parties titled with generally misleading names. The bill passed the Legislative Assembly without any recorded objections on 29 July, and passed the Legislative Council by 33 votes to 4 on 11 August 2026. The legislation received royal assent on 18 August 2026 and went into effect the following day.

Details of Legislative Council vote to abolish group voting tickets

Electoral Amendment (Miscellaneous Matters) Bill 2026 – Third Reading
Party	Votes for	Votes against	Absent/Abstained
Labor (15)	15: Ryan Batchelor; John Berger; Lizzie Blandthorn; Enver Erdogan; Jacinta Ermacora; Michael Galea; Shaun Leane; Tom McIntosh; Harriet Shing; Ingrid Stitt; Jaclyn Symes; Lee Tarlamis; Sonja Terpstra; Gayle Tierney; Sheena Watt	–	–
Liberal (11)	11: Georgie Crozier; David Davis; Renee Heath; Ann-Marie Hermans; Wendy Lovell; Trung Luu; Bev McArthur; Joe McCracken; Nick McGowan; Evan Mulholland; Richard Welch	–	–
Greens (4)	4: Katherine Copsey; Anasina Gray-Barberio; Sarah Mansfield; Aiv Puglielli	–	–
National (2)	2: Melina Bath; Gaelle Broad	–	–
Legalise Cannabis (2)	–	1: Rachel Payne	1: David Ettershank
Animal Justice (1)	–	1: Georgie Purcell	–
Libertarian (1)	–	1: David Limbrick	–
One Nation (1)	1: Rikkie-Lee Tyrrell	–	–
Shooters (1)	–	1: Jeff Bourman	–
Independent (2)	–	–	2: Moira Deeming; Adem Somyurek
Total	33	4	3

== Registered parties ==
Below are the parties registered by the Victorian Electoral Commission:

- Animal Justice Party
- Australian Citizens Party
- Australian Democrats
- Australian Greens
- Australian Labor Party
- Christian Alliance Party – Reform AU
- Climate Action Now
- Democratic Labour Party
- Family First Victoria
- Free Palestine
- I'm Voting to Avoid the Fine
- Legalise Cannabis
- Liberal Party
- Libertarian Party
- National Party
- One Nation
- Put Australia First, Save the Environment
- Safety Victoria – Violent Crime Prevention
- Shooters, Fishers and Farmers Party
- Socialist Alliance
- Sustainable Australia Party
- The Republican Make Australia Great Again
- The West Party
- Victorian Socialists

== Candidates and retiring MPs ==
The following members either did not nominate or announced that they will not contest the 2026 election:

=== Labor ===
- Jackson Taylor MLA (Bayswater) – announced 23 September 2025
- Steve McGhie MLA (Melton) – announced 23 September 2025
- Emma Vulin MLA (Pakenham) – announced 30 September 2025
- Jordan Crugnale MLA (Bass) – announced 2 October 2025
- Natalie Hutchins MLA (Sydenham) – announced 16 October 2025
- Shaun Leane MLC (North-Eastern Metropolitan Region) – announced 1 December 2025
- Danny Pearson MLA (Essendon) – announced 10 April 2026
- Mary-Anne Thomas MLA (Macedon) – announced 10 April 2026
- Gayle Tierney MLC (Western Victoria Region) – announced 10 April 2026
- Gary Maas MLA (Narre Warren South) – announced 5 June 2026
- Lily D'Ambrosio MLA (Mill Park) – announced 30 July 2026
- Harriet Shing MLC (Eastern Victoria Region) – announced 30 July 2026
- Jacinta Allan MLA (Bendigo East) – announced 14 August 2026
- Maree Edwards MLA (Bendigo West) – announced 27 August 2026
- Darren Cheeseman MLA (Note: In 2024, Cheeseman was suspended from the Labor Party caucus. He still remains a rank-and-file member of the party.) (South Barwon) – did not nominate 9 November 2026.

=== Liberal ===
- Bill Tilley MLA (Benambra) – announced 13 March 2024
- David Hodgett MLA (Croydon) – announced 6 August 2025
- Michael O'Brien MLA (Malvern) – announced 9 September 2025
- Kim Wells MLA (Rowville) – announced 14 September 2025
- Wendy Lovell MLC (Northern Victoria Region) – announced 5 January 2026
- Joe McCracken MLC (Western Victoria Region) – announced 12 January 2026

=== National ===
- Peter Walsh MLA (Murray Plains) – announced 26 November 2024
- Tim Bull MLA (Gippsland East) – announced 19 May 2026
- Kim O'Keeffe MLA (Shepparton) – announced 21 July 2026

=== Greens ===
- Tim Read MLA (Brunswick) – announced 29 January 2026

Read died in September 2026.

=== Legalise Cannabis ===
- David Ettershank MLC (Western Metropolitan Region) – announced 2 June 2026

=== Independent ===
- Adem Somyurek MLC (Northern Metropolitan Region) – announced 24 September 2026

== Campaign ==
A debate in Newlyn for the Ripon electorate

Victorian opposition leader Brad Battin, announced at a state conference for the Victorian Liberal Party on 13 September 2025, that if elected his government would introduce increased stop-and-search powers for the state's police force. The powers are modeled after legislation initially passed by the Queensland Government, known as Jack's Law after Queensland teenager Jack Beasley who was fatally stabbed to death on the Gold Coast in 2019, would see police and protective service officers (PSOs) equipped with metal detectors and the ability to stop-and-search individuals in public places at random as part of an effort to curb knife crime. Battin announced such powers would be granted by Christmas of 2026, less than a month after the elections are scheduled to be held.

The Liberal/National opposition additionally vowed to repeal the statewide treaty law within 100 days of government if it wins the 2026 Victorian state election. The party withdrew their support for the law, which saw bipartisan support when it passed in 2022, following the failure of the 2023 national referendum on an Indigenous Voice to Parliament. After withdrawing support, the Coalition has proposed replacing the elected body instituted by the law, the First Peoples' Assembly of Victoria, with an unelected body under a new statutory corporation called Gellung Warl.

Pauline Hanson's One Nation also vowed to repeal the legislation, without providing any alternative or replacement for it, at their campaign launch event held at Crown Casino in Melbourne on 3 October. Additionally, the party stated it would cancel the under-construction Suburban Rail Loop project, promising to divert funds to the also under-construction Airport Rail line as well as the electrification of railway line to Melton. Plans to introduce artificial intelligence to Victoria Police in an attempt to free up front-line officers were also announced alongside sign-on bonuses and accommodation allowances, as well as lowering the age of criminal responsibility to 10 years old.

The event, which ABC News had been barred from entering, was hosted by Warren Pickering, who had been announced as One Nation Victoria's lead candidate two months ago on 2 August. He was joined on stage by Pauline Hanson, alongside incumbent MP Rikkie-Lee Tyrrell and candidates Colleen Harkin and Mark Nicholson. The launch also featured an artificially generated campaign video that depicted a man of African-descent wielding a machete and a Middle Eastern man wearing a suicide vest. When questioned about the video One Nation candidate Colleen Harkins defended the video, stating that it tackled the "general view about all the things that are going wrong in Australia" and denied that it was prejudiced, asking if people would have complained "if it was a white-skinned person or a female with blonde hair".

Following the campaign launch, Government minister Nick Staikos criticised the party as "importing the worst of American politics to our state." When asked about comments made by Pauline Hanson, lambasting the Liberal/National opposition as being unreliable and untrustworthy against the incumbent Labor government, opposition leader Jess Wilson refused to mention One Nation by name instead stating that she knows "Victorians are looking for a change of government this year," and that the "only way to do that is to elect a Liberal and Nationals government."

In mid-August the Coalition also vowed to reverse the ban on gas connections to new homes and promised to cap freeway tolls to a maximum of $50 per week for two years, mirroring a $50 weekly cap that had been introduced by New South Wales' Labor government a month earlier alongside other cost-of-living relief policies. In response the Victorian Labor government pledged a $30 weekly cap on freeway tolls, announcing the day after, on 18 October, that they would also introduce a similar $30 weekly cap on public transport fares.

Shortly after, the Liberal party's Shadow Minister for Public Transport Matthew Guy announced promises to order 25 new hybrid diesel-electric trains to service the line to Melton, which has awaited electrification since the Western Rail Plan was proposed in 2018. Guy stated that hybrid trains would allow suburban trains to Melton and Wyndham Vale in a "realistic timeframe", instead of waiting for electrification which was "never going to happen." The proposal was heavily criticised with Minister for Public Transport Vicki Ward stating that such trains would "become redundant when electrification comes through." Rail Futures Institute president John Hearsch stated that safety concerns with large volumes of diesel fuel in underground rail tunnels would also likely prevent regulatory approval for hybrid locomotives to run through the City Loop as Guy had proposed.

On October 15, the Liberal/National Coalition matched Labor's Free Abortion election promise.

On October 25, Labor revealed a $1.5 billion plan to reduce hospital waiting times. The next day the Liberal/National Coalition vowed to ban the term 'globalise the intifada' if elected.

The Age reported on 8 November that Bianca Colecchia, state secretary of One Nation, had been professionally connected to a man accused of ties with the Comanchero bikie gang, and that Kelvin Morton, One Nation's general manager, had overstated credentials on his resume.

On 15 November 2026, Labor and the Liberals held their campaign launches.

On 17 November 2026, News24 and the Herald Sun hosted a leader's debate between Ben Carroll, Jess Wilson, Ellen Sandell, and Warren Pickering. Liberal leader Jess Wilson was declared the winner of the debate, receiving 39% of responses from viewers, compared to 25% for Greens leader Ellen Sandell, 16% for One Nation leader Warren Pickering, and 7% for Premier Ben Carroll. 13% of respondents remained undecided.

=== Newspaper endorsements ===
==== Weekend editions ====
Newspaper	Owner	Endorsement	
Sunday Herald-Sun	News Corp	TBD	TBD
The Sunday Age	Nine Entertainment	TBD	

==== Metropolitan dailies ====
Newspaper	Owner	Endorsement
The Age	Nine Entertainment	
The Australian	News Corp	
Australian Financial Review	Nine Entertainment	
Herald Sun	News Corp	

== Candidate disendorsements and controversies ==
=== Liberals ===
After originally losing preselection, then being re-instated after the winning Liberal was found to have provided court reference for a friend convicted of sexually assaulting a child, Moira Deeming was again dumped by the Liberal Party in July 2026 after making assault claims against fellow Liberal Matthew Guy that CCTV footage showed to be Guy putting a hand on her back to speak to her in a noisy room.

Grant Hutchinson, Liberal candidate for Croydon, was disendorsed by the party in October 2026, being replaced by Toby Wooldridge. Wilson said of the disendorsement that further details had emerged relating to a litigation Hutchinson was involved in with former members of his law firm. Hutchinson subsequently commenced legal proceedings against the Liberal Party challenging his dumping.

On 11 November, the Liberal Party dumped their candidate for Williamstown, Paul Lindemann, after racist social media posts about Indigenous Australians surfaced, which followed hours after it was revealed that Lindemann had been recently suspended from a local basketball association where he coached an under 14s girls team, for mocking and sledging a player on an opposing team.

=== One Nation ===
On 3 October 2026, prominent One Nation Victorian candidate, Mark Nicholson, threatened to jail former premiers Daniel Andrews and Jacinta Allan “by Christmas” if One Nation wins November’s state election.

Also in October 2026, One Nation’s candidate for Melbourne, Matthew Collins, was revealed to have a history of "promoting far-right rhetoric about waging religious war against Muslims, using misogynistic language and spreading COVID-19 conspiracy theories." One Nation refused to answer detailed questions about Collins’ posts and initially continued to support his candidacy but he stood down some two weeks later after social media posts where he said that “consent is cringe” and claiming that he has "never once asked any women for any form of consent, ever."

On 1 November, One Nation candidate for Ashwood, Steven Mitchell, was revealed to have advertised a public appearance with a member of a group that promotes conspiracy theories about the September 11 terrorist attack and the Port Arthur Massacre, along with claims that income tax is voluntary.

==== Franco Guardiani ====
One Nation dumped its candidate for Preston, Franco Guardiani, on 10 November over social media posts on X that he made praising Adolf Hitler and Nazi Germany, as well as denying the extent of the Holocaust. Guardiani's account featured numerous antisemitism, Islamophobic, and conspiratorial posts such as claiming that "Jews created Islam to destroy Christianity" and that weather modifications were controlled by "globalist [sic] using technology and chemtrails," praising Hitler as the "GOAT" (greatest of all time), and saying that "importing Islam is making pedophillia legal." Commenting on Sean Black, a federal campaign manager rehired by One Nation despite being convicted of rape in 2018, Guardiani wrote "at least he is a convicted rapist and not a Muslim rapist who never gets convicted."

Speaking on the matter, Warren Pickering said "At a time when Jewish Australians are experiencing unprecedented persecution, we are appalled that these comments have been made," while admitting that the party's candidate vetting process needed to be improved.

==== Chris Moore ====
On 11 November, candidate for Greenvale, Chris Moore, apologised over a series of offensive Islamophobic, racist, sexist, and homophobic remarks he made on social media between 2010 and 2012. These comments included that he "doesn’t like the way the new homo cleaner at work looks at me", calling former-prime minister Julia Gillard a "slut", repeated references to Indian Australians as "curry munchers," as well as sharing a photo of a woman and a child both wearing a burqa next to two full plastic garbage bags with the caption "Haha, spot the difference."

The electorate, which is a fairly safe Labor seat, has a large Middle Eastern and West Asian population and one of the highest proportions of people born in the Middle East. In response, a Labor party spokesperson said that the comments were "reprehensible" and that there was "no place for racist, Islamophobic and sexist comments," with the Liberal party saying that it would put the candidate last on its how-to-vote card for the electorate. One Nation did not disendorse Moore, who apologised for the remarks saying that the comments were unthoughtful and that they "don't reflect who I am today."

== Pre-electoral pendulum ==
Labor seats (54)
Seat	Member	Party	Margin
Marginal
Northcote	Kat Theophanous	ALP	0.2% v GRN
Bass	Jordan Crugnale	ALP	0.2%
Pakenham	Emma Vulin	ALP	0.4%
Hastings	Paul Mercurio	ALP	1.4%
Pascoe Vale	Anthony Cianflone	ALP	2.0% v GRN
Preston	Nathan Lambert	ALP	2.1% v GRN
Ripon	Martha Haylett	ALP	3.0%
Glen Waverley	John Mullahy	ALP	3.3%
Bayswater	Jackson Taylor	ALP	4.2%
Footscray	Katie Hall	ALP	4.2% v GRN
Yan Yean	Lauren Kathage	ALP	4.3%
Melton	Steve McGhie	ALP	4.6%
Fairly safe
Ashwood	Matt Fregon	ALP	6.2%
Sunbury	Josh Bull	ALP	6.4%
Niddrie	Ben Carroll	ALP	6.7%
Greenvale	Iwan Walters	ALP	7.1%
Eureka	Michaela Settle	ALP	7.2%
Box Hill	Paul Hamer	ALP	7.2%
Ringwood	Will Fowles (IND)	ALP	7.5%
Monbulk	Daniela De Martino	ALP	7.6%
Bentleigh	Nick Staikos	ALP	8.0%
Mordialloc	Tim Richardson	ALP	8.2%
Narre Warren South	Gary Maas	ALP	8.3%
Point Cook	Mathew Hilakari	ALP	8.3%
Bellarine	Alison Marchant	ALP	8.5%
Frankston	Paul Edbrooke	ALP	8.7%
Narre Warren North	Belinda Wilson	ALP	8.7%
Sydenham	Natalie Hutchins	ALP	8.8%
Cranbourne	Pauline Richards	ALP	9.0%
Eltham	Vicki Ward	ALP	9.0%
Macedon	Mary-Anne Thomas	ALP	9.5%
St Albans	Natalie Suleyman	ALP	9.6%
Carrum	Sonya Kilkenny	ALP	9.8%
South Barwon	Darren Cheeseman (Note: In April 2024, Cheeseman was suspended from the Labor Party caucus. He still remains a rank-and-file member of the party.)	ALP	9.8%
Safe
Clarinda	Meng Heang Tak	ALP	10.2%
Bendigo East	Jacinta Allan	ALP	10.8%
Mulgrave	Eden Foster (Note: Elected at the 2023 Mulgrave state by-election following the resignation of Daniel Andrews.)	ALP	10.8% v IND (Note: The two-candidate-preferred result of the 2023 by-election was ALP 6.5% vs IND.)
Werribee	John Lister (Note: Lister succeeded Pallas following the 2025 Werribee state by-election.)	ALP	10.9% (Note: While Lister retained Werribee for Labor on a margin of 0.8% at the 2025 by-election, he will go into the state election based upon the margin that the party had won at the 2022 election.)
Albert Park	Nina Taylor	ALP	11.2%
Mill Park	Lily D'Ambrosio	ALP	11.6%
Wendouree	Juliana Addison	ALP	11.9%
Tarneit	Dylan Wight	ALP	12.3%
Essendon	Danny Pearson	ALP	12.5%
Bundoora	Colin Brooks	ALP	12.7%
Ivanhoe	Anthony Carbines	ALP	13.0%
Williamstown	Melissa Horne	ALP	13.4%
Oakleigh	Steve Dimopoulos	ALP	13.5%
Kororoit	Luba Grigorovitch	ALP	14.5%
Bendigo West	Maree Edwards	ALP	14.6%
Geelong	Christine Couzens	ALP	14.7%
Broadmeadows	Kathleen Matthews-Ward	ALP	15.5%
Thomastown	Bronwyn Halfpenny	ALP	15.8%
Lara	Ella George	ALP	15.9%
Kalkallo	Ros Spence	ALP	16.5%
Dandenong	Gabrielle Williams	ALP	18.3%
Laverton	Sarah Connolly	ALP	18.4%

Liberal/National seats (29)
Seat	Member	Party	Margin
Marginal
Mornington	Chris Crewther	LIB	0.7% v IND
Benambra	Bill Tilley	LIB	0.9% v IND
Mildura	Jade Benham	NAT	1.2% v IND
Croydon	David Hodgett	LIB	1.4%
Hawthorn	John Pesutto	LIB	1.7%
Polwarth	Richard Riordan	LIB	1.8%
Caulfield	David Southwick	LIB	2.1%
Rowville	Kim Wells	LIB	3.7%
Kew	Jess Wilson	LIB	4.0%
Warrandyte	Nicole Werner (Note: Werner succeeded Smith following the 2023 Warrandyte state by-election.)	LIB	4.3% (Note: The two-candidate-preferred result of the 2023 by-election was LIB 21.0% vs GRN. However Labor did not contest the by-election, therefore the LIB vs GRN margin won't be the two-candidate-preferred margin for Warrandyte at the next state election, and therefore should not be used in the pendulum. The LIB vs ALP margin for Warrandyte at the 2022 state election is used instead.)
Morwell	Martin Cameron	NAT	4.4%
Berwick	Brad Battin	LIB	4.7%
Sandringham	Brad Rowswell	LIB	5.0%
Brighton	James Newbury	LIB	5.1%
Evelyn	Bridget Vallence	LIB	5.4%
Bulleen	Matthew Guy	LIB	5.9%
Fairly safe
Nepean	Sam Groth	LIB	6.4%
Shepparton	Kim O'Keeffe	NAT	6.8% v IND
Eildon	Cindy McLeish	LIB	7.0%
South-West Coast	Roma Britnell	LIB	8.0%
Malvern	Michael O'Brien	LIB	8.1%
Euroa	Annabelle Cleeland	NAT	9.9%
Safe
Narracan (Note: Due to the sudden death of Nationals candidate Shaun Gilchrist, the election in Narracan was deferred, and a supplementary election was instead held on 28 January 2023.)	Wayne Farnham	LIB	13.0% v IND
Gippsland South	Danny O'Brien	NAT	15.6%
Ovens Valley	Tim McCurdy	NAT	17.8%
Very safe
Lowan	Emma Kealy	NAT	21.6%
Murray Plains	Peter Walsh	NAT	23.4%
Gippsland East	Tim Bull	NAT	24.6%

Crossbench seats (5)
Seat	Member	Party	Margin
Richmond	Gabrielle de Vietri	GRN	7.3% v ALP
Melbourne	Ellen Sandell	GRN	10.2% v ALP
Prahran	Rachel Westaway (Note: Elected following the 2025 Prahran state by-election.)	LIB	12.0% v LIB (Note: The two-candidate-preferred result of the 2025 by-election was LIB 1.4% vs GRN.)
Brunswick	Vacant (Note: Tim Read died in September 2026. The seat will remain vacant until the election as it was not far enough out for a by-election to be held.)	GRN	13.7% v ALP

== Opinion polling ==
=== Primary vote ===
Primary vote opinion polling for the 2026 Victoria State election

=== Two-party preferred ===
Two-party preferred opinion polling for the 2026 Victoria State election
