= Electoral results for the district of Point Cook =

Electoral ward results

This is a list of electoral results for the Electoral district of Point Cook in Victorian state elections.

== Members for Point Cook ==
Member	Party	Term
Mathew Hilakari	Labor	2022–present

== Election results ==
=== Elections in the 2020s ===
2022 Victorian state election: Point Cook
Party	Candidate	Votes	%	±%
Labor	Mathew Hilakari	15,657	40.0	−9.5
Liberal	Angela Newhouse	9,651	24.7	+0.5
Independent	Joe Garra	2,717	6.9	+6.9
Greens	Shamsher Khan	2,656	6.8	−1.1
Family First	Carolyn Cronkwright	1,496	3.8	+3.8
Victorian Socialists	Alex McAulay	1,399	3.6	+3.6
Democratic Labour	Daniel Hamman	1,369	3.5	+3.5
Independent	Larry Zhao	814	2.1	+2.1
Animal Justice	Terri Beech	804	2.1	+2.1
Freedom	Adrian Abdulovski	571	1.5	+1.5
Justice	Scott Grimley	514	1.3	+1.3
Independent	Shwetali Sawant	467	1.2	+1.2
Health Australia	Emma Law	383	1.0	+0.9
New Democrats	Rakhi P. Chaudhary	358	0.9	+0.9
Transport Matters	Lisa Jane Gatti	245	0.6	+0.6
Total formal votes		39,099	89.8	−4.8
Informal votes		4,448	10.2	+4.8
Turnout		43,547	87.5	+2.7
Two-party-preferred result
Labor	Mathew Hilakari	22,810	58.3	−4.4
Liberal	Angela Newhouse	16,289	41.7	+4.4
Labor hold		Swing	−4.4	
