= Climate Action Now =

Victorian political party

- Founder: Monica Smit
- Registered: 7 October 2026

Website
- canparty.com.au

Climate Action Now is a political party in Victoria founded by Monica Smit. The party initially intended to direct its preferences to right-wing parties such as One Nation and Family First through group voting tickets. At the 2026 Victorian state election, it is standing in four lower house seats, all targets of the Victorian Greens.

== Foundation and 2026 election ==
Climate Action Now applied for registration with the Victorian Electoral Commission (VEC) on 18 June 2026. It was founded by Monica Smit, who started the anti-vaccine and anti-lockdown group Reignite Democracy Australia. Smit said that she would use Victoria's system of group voting tickets, which allows parties to allocate the preferences they receive above the line in the upper house, to direct Climate Action Now's preferences to One Nation, Family First and related parties. Earlier in the year, Smit had announced her intention to found the Save the Environment Party, which she described as "strategic" and a way to help conservative parties elect candidates. Group ticket voting was abolished by the Victorian parliament in August.

Climate Action Now is standing in four seats at the 2026 election, all targets of the Greens.

Climate Action Now was registered by the VEC on 7 October. At the 2026 Victorian state election, the party stood no candidates in the upper house, but stood four lower house candidates in the districts of Footscray, Pascoe Vale, Prahran, and Preston. Psephologist Antony Green said that all of these were target seats of the Victorian Greens, and that the party seemed to be nominating candidates to disadvantage the Greens.
