= Handsome Poets =

Dutch indie pop band

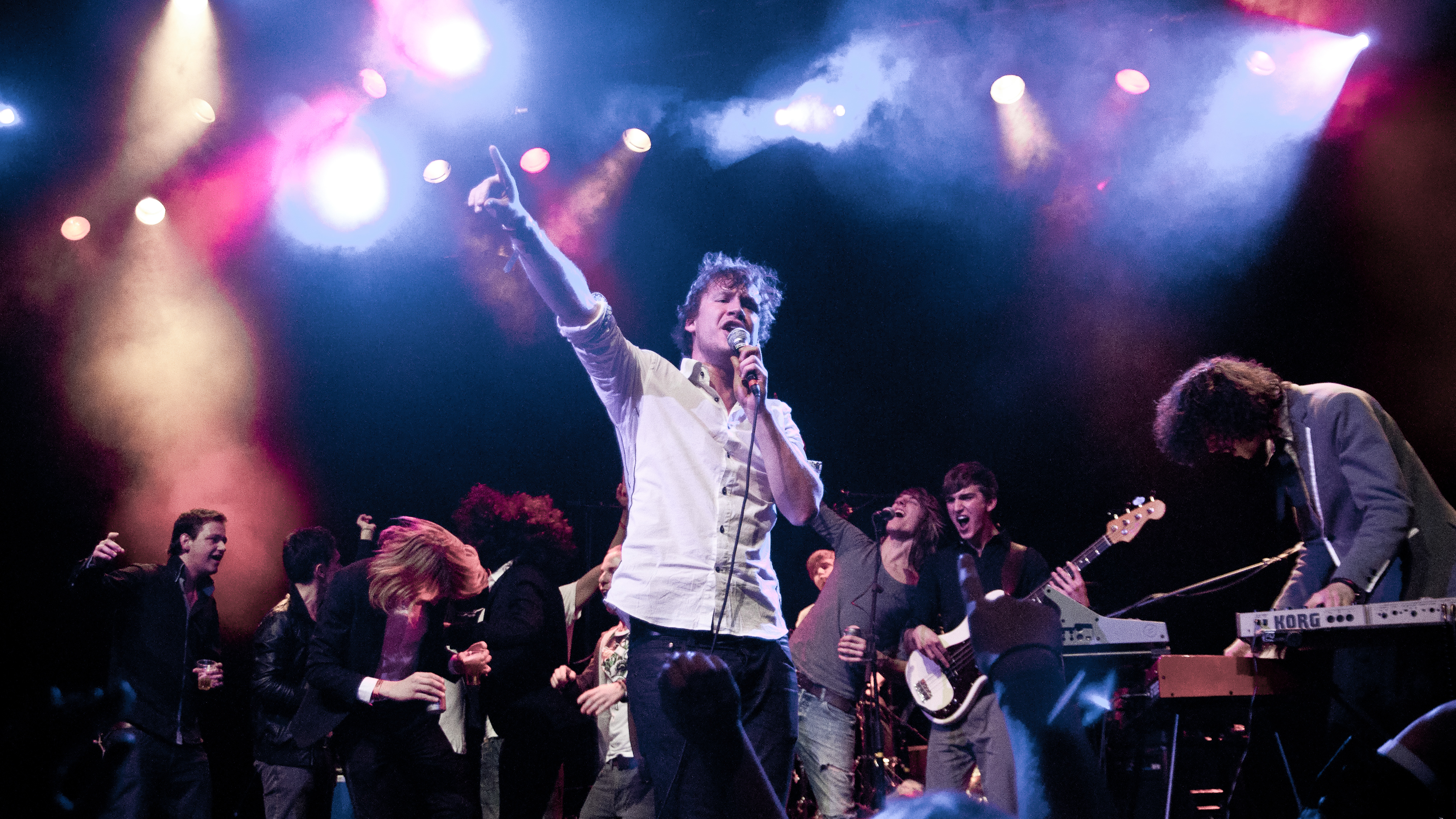
- Handsome Poets in 2010

Background information
- Origin: Gouda, Netherlands
- Genres: Indie Pop
- Years active: 2010-present
- Members: Tim van Esch; Nils Davidse; Daniël Smit; Erik Bruil; Ricardo Szabó
- Past members: Eelke Mastebroek
- Website: www.handsomepoets.nl

Handsome Poets is a Dutch indie pop band consisting of five members: Tim van Esch (lead singer), Daniel Smit (drummer), Nils Davidse (keyboard), Erik Bruil (guitar), and Ricardo Szabó (bass guitar). This group was founded in 2009 in Gouda.

== Discography ==
=== Albums ===
- Handsome Poets (2011) (highest rank 13 on the Mega Top 50)
- Sky On Fire (2012)
- 2015 (2015)

=== Singles ===
- Blinded (2010)
- Dance (The war is over) (2010)
- (We can't be) Saints (2011)
- Sky on fire (2012)
- New Life (2012)
- Alright (2013)
