= The West Party =

Victorian political party

- Founder: Paul Hopper
- Founded: 2025
- Registered: 7 August 2026

Website
- thewestparty.org.au

The West Party is an Australian political party in the state of Victoria. Founded in 2025 by Paul Hopper, the party will stand candidates in the western suburbs of Melbourne at the 2026 state election.

== Foundation and 2026 election ==
West Party candidates Joe Garra and Mark Grech at an election forum.

The West Party was formed in 2025, after independent candidate Paul Hopper received 14.6 per cent of the primary vote in the 2025 Werribee by-election. Hopper, the party's founder and coordinator, had previously stood in the Werribee district at the 2022 Victorian state election. Joe Garra, another independent candidate, stood in Werribee in 2018, and Point Cook in 2022. As Hopper described it to Crikey, their candidacies were the nucleus for the new party, with people expressing interest to him about standing for parliament themselves after 2022.

Traditionally, the western suburbs of Melbourne have voted for the Labor Party by large margins. However, in the years leading up to the West Party's foundation, Labor's vote in the area has fallen. The West Party only stands candidates in the western suburbs, and has positioned itself as a community-based movement. Hopper has described the party as "sensible centre", and candidates for the party decide their own policies based on community consultation.

The West Party are standing in twelve lower house seats at the 2026 Victorian state election.

The West Party was registered by the Victorian Electoral Commission on 7 August 2026. The party is standing in the 2026 Victorian state election, contesting twelve lower house seats in the west and the Western Metropolitan Region in the upper house.

== See also ==
- Voice for the West - 2014 political party based in the western suburbs
