= Free Palestine (Australia) =

Victorian political party

- President: Avi Yemini
- Founder: Avi Yemini
- Founded: 27 April 2026
- Registered: 5 August 2026

Website
- freepalestinepartyvic.com

Free Palestine is a political party in Victoria. Founded in 2026 by Avi Yemini, a former Israeli soldier and YouTuber, it aimed to use Victoria's group voting tickets to direct preferences to parties that wish to "free Palestine from Hamas". The party's name has been described as deliberately misleading. After group voting tickets were abolished in August 2026, the party stood five candidates in the 2026 Victorian state election, all in seats targeted by the Victorian Greens.

== Foundation and 2026 election ==
Avi Yemini is the party's founder and president.

Avi Yemini, a Melbourne-based YouTuber and former Israeli soldier, announced on 27 April 2026 that he would seek to register a Free Palestine party for the coming Victorian state election. At the time, Victoria used group voting tickets in the upper house: above the line, voters can only give their first preference, and their remaining preferences are allocated by the party they voted for. Yemini said that he chose the Free Palestine name as it appealed to "useful idiots", and that the party would distribute its preferences to parties which would "free Palestine from Hamas". Ibrahim Hadi, a Sydney university student and activist, sought in response to register a party with the same name to preference pro-Palestinian parties, describing Yemini's attempt as a mockery of the Palestinian cause.

Free Palestine's application for registration was published by the Victorian Electoral Commission (VEC) on 2 June. The VEC registered the party on 5 August, with Hadi's Free Palestine Party thusly rejected due to resembling Yemini's registered party name too closely. Yemini announced shortly afterwards that he was the party's president. The party's name was described by ABC News and Graeme Orr, a professor of law at the University of Queensland, as deliberately misleading. In the same month, Victoria's parliament voted to abolish group voting tickets. Yemini, an opponent of group ticket voting, claimed credit for its abolition.

Free Palestine are contesting five lower house seats in Melbourne.

At the 2026 state election, Free Palestine did not stand in the upper house, but stood five lower house candidates in the seats of Footscray, Northcote, Pascoe Vale, Prahran, and Preston. Psephologist Antony Green said that the five seats contested by Free Palestine were all targets of the Victorian Greens, and that the party seemed to be standing to disadvantage the Greens.
