= I'm Voting to Avoid the Fine =

Victorian political party

- Founder: Daniel Smit
- Registered: 9 October 2026
- Ideology: Anti-compulsory voting

Website
- avoidthefine.com.au

I'm Voting to Avoid the Fine is a political party in Victoria founded in 2026. It is led by Daniel Smit, brother of Monica Smit, and advocates for the abolition of compulsory voting. At its founding, it intended to use group voting tickets to direct preferences to One Nation.

== Foundation, 2026 election ==
I'm Voting to Avoid the Fine applied to register with the Victorian Electoral Commission (VEC) on 25 June 2026. It is led by Daniel Smit, the brother of Monica Smit, who founded anti-vaccine group Reignite Democracy Australia. Smit intended to send his party's preferences to One Nation through the group voting tickets in the upper house. Group voting tickets were repealed in August.

Lower house seats contested by I'm Voting to Avoid the Fine at the 2026 state election.

I'm Voting to Avoid the Fine was registered by the VEC on 9 October. The party did not stand any upper house candidates at the 2026 state election, but stood in the lower house in four districts: Footscray, Northcote, Pascoe Vale, and Preston. Psephologist Antony Green noted that these four districts were being targeted by the Victorian Greens, and that the party was likely trying to disadvantage the Greens. I'm Voting to Avoid the Fine's main policies are to abolish compulsory voting and to scrap the fine for not voting.
