= Frank Schiefler =

Australian political candidate (born 1992 or 1993)

- Schiefler in 2026

Personal details
- Born: 1992 or 1993 (age 33–34) South Africa
- Party: Liberal
- Website: www.frankschiefler.com.au

Frank Schiefler (born 1992 or 1993) is an Australian political candidate and a former soldier in the Australian Army. He is running as a candidate in the electoral district of Hastings at the 2026 Victorian state election for the Victorian Liberal Party.

== Life and career ==
Schiefler was born in South Africa in 1992 or 1993. His family moved to Australia when he was young, and after graduating secondary school at 16, Schiefler enlisted in the 1st Intelligence Battalion of the army. He completed a Bachelor of Economics.

In April 2026, Schiefler was preselected as the Liberal candidate in Hastings for the 2026 state election, standing against Labor incumbent Paul Mercurio. At a candidates forum in the lead-up to the state election, Schiefler advocated for upgrades to local roads and said that a Liberal government would keep Hastings' police station open 24 hours a day.
