= The Republican Make Australia Great Again =

Victorian political party

- Founder: Raj Saini
- Registered: 30 September 2026

Website
- www.therepublican.org.au

The Republican Make Australia Great Again is an political party in Victoria, founded by Raj Saini and registered in 2026. It is contesting the 2026 Victorian state election.

== Registration and 2026 election ==
The Republican Make Australia Great Again applied for registration with the Victorian Electoral Commission (VEC) on 18 June 2026, with Raj Kumar Saini as its founder and registered officer. Saini is a former staffer for the Australian Labor Party and delegate for the Australian Workers' Union. He stood for the Senate at the 2025 federal election as a grouped independent candidate. The party was registered by the VEC on 30 September.

The party is standing in eleven lower house seats in Melbourne.

At the 2026 Victorian state election, The Republican Make Australia Great Again are standing in 11 lower house seats, and in the upper house regions of Western Metropolitan and Western Victoria. According to ABC News, much of the text on the party's website was generated with AI. Their website includes nine policy areas of focus, and the party has promised to cut red tape.
