= List of political parties in Australia =

The politics of Australia has a mild two-party system, with two dominant political groupings in the Australian political system, the Australian Labor Party and the Liberal Party of Australia. Federally, 13 of the 150 members of the lower house (Members of Parliament, or MPs) are not members of major parties, as well as 20 of the 76 members of the upper house (senators).

The Parliament of Australia has a number of distinctive features including compulsory voting, with full-preference instant-runoff voting in single-member seats to elect the lower house, the Australian House of Representatives, and the use of the single transferable vote to elect the upper house, the Australian Senate.

Other parties tend to perform better in the upper houses of the various federal and state parliaments since these typically use a form of proportional representation, except for in Tasmania where the lower house is proportionally elected and the upper house is made up of single member districts.

== History ==
Two political groups dominate the Australian political spectrum, forming a de facto two-party system. One is the Australian Labor Party (ALP), a centre-left party which is formally linked to the Australian labour movement. Formed in 1893, it has been a major party federally since 1901, and has been one of the two major parties since the 1910 federal election. The ALP is in government in New South Wales, Victoria, South Australia, Western Australia, the Australian Capital Territory and the Federal Government of Australia.

The other group is the Liberal–National Coalition, an alliance of the Liberal Party of Australia and National Party of Australia. The parties are in a formal coalition at federal level and in New South Wales and Victoria, but are not formally allied in Western Australia and South Australia. The main party in this group is the centre-right Liberal Party. The Liberal Party is the modern form of a conservative group that has existed since the combination of the Protectionist Party and Free Trade Party into the Fusion Liberal Party in 1909. Although this group has changed its nomenclature, there has been a general continuity of MPs and structure between different forms of the party. Its modern form was founded by Robert Menzies in 1944. The party's philosophy is generally liberal conservatism.

On 22 January 2026, The Liberal–National Coalition was dissolved over an internal dispute over a hate speech bill. The Liberal Party of Australia voted yes to the bill and the National Party of Australia voted no to the bill. The Coalition reformed on 8 February 2026.

The National Party represents rural and agricultural interests. The Nationals contest a limited number of seats and do not generally directly compete with the Liberal Party. Its ideology is generally more socially conservative than that of the Liberal Party. In 1987, the National Party made an abortive run for the office of prime minister in its own right, in the Joh for Canberra campaign. However, it has generally not aspired to become the majority party in the coalition, and it is generally understood that the prime minister of Australia will be a member of either the Labor or Liberal parties. On two occasions (involving Earle Page in 1939, and John McEwen from December 1967 to January 1968), the deputy prime minister, the leader of the National Party (then known as the Country Party), became the prime minister temporarily, upon the death of the incumbent prime minister. Arthur Fadden was the only other Country Party prime minister. He assumed office in August 1941 after the resignation of Robert Menzies and served as prime minister until October of that year.

The Liberal and National parties have merged in Queensland and the Northern Territory. The Liberal National Party of Queensland, formed in 2008, is a branch of the Liberal Party, but it is affiliated with the Nationals and members elected to federal parliament may sit as either Liberals or Nationals. The Country Liberal Party in the Northern Territory is likewise affiliated with both the Liberals and Nationals and its members may join either federal parliamentary party room.

Historically, support for either the Coalition or the Labor Party was often viewed as being based on social class, with the upper and middle classes supporting the Coalition and the working class supporting Labor. This has been a less important factor since the 1970s and 1980s when the Labor Party gained a significant bloc of middle-class support and the Coalition gained a significant bloc of working-class support.

The two-party duopoly has been relatively stable, with the two groupings (Labor and Coalition) gaining at least 70% of the primary vote in every election between 1910 and 2019 (including the votes of autonomous state parties). Third parties have only rarely received more than 10% of the vote for the Australian House of Representatives in a federal election, such as the Australian Democrats in the 1990 election and the Australian Greens in 2010, 2016, 2019, 2022 and 2025. In some parliaments, support for smaller parties and Independents has resulted in major parties having to come to Confidence and supply agreements to form government, such as after the 2010 Australian federal election.

== Party registration ==
=== Federal ===
To run candidates in a federal election under the party's name, a party must register with the Australian Electoral Commission (AEC), otherwise a member of an unregistered party may run only as an independent. The AEC's eligibility requirements for registration include "being an organisation with an aim of endorsing candidates for election to the Senate and/or House of Representatives," and "having either: at least one member of the party who is a Senator or Member of the House of Representatives in the Parliament of the Commonwealth and not a member of another party (Parliamentary party); or at least 1,500 members who are on the Electoral Roll and who are not also relied upon by another party for registration purposes (non-Parliamentary party)."

=== States ===
Each state in Australia has its own electoral commission responsible for state and local elections. While each has its own requirements for party registration, they are consistent in requiring a minimum number of members or representation in parliament.

Party Registration
Jurisdiction	Electoral commission	Membership requirement
Federal	Australian Electoral Commission	1,500
New South Wales	NSW Electoral Commission	750
Victoria	Victorian Electoral Commission	500
Queensland	Queensland Electoral Commission	500
Western Australia	Western Australian Electoral Commission	500
South Australia	Electoral Commission of South Australia	200
Northern Territory	Northern Territory Electoral Commission	200
Tasmania	Tasmanian Electoral Commission	100
Australian Capital Territory	Australian Capital Territory Electoral Commission	100

== Federal parties ==
=== Federal parliamentary parties ===
Political party	Members of Parliament (May 2025)		Party leader(s)	Ideology
Political party	House of Reps	Senate	Party leader(s)	Ideology
Australian Labor Party	94 / 150	30 / 76	Anthony Albanese	Social democracy
Liberal Party	28 / 150	23 / 76	Angus Taylor	Liberal conservatism
National Party	14 / 150	4 / 76	Matt Canavan	Conservatism; Agrarianism
Australian Greens	1 / 150	10 / 76	David Shoebridge	Green politics; Progressivism
One Nation	2 / 150	4 / 76	Pauline Hanson	Hansonism; Right-wing populism
Community Strong Australia	2 / 150	0 / 76	Collective leadership	Centrism; Environmentalism
Australia's Voice	0 / 150	1 / 76	Fatima Payman	Progressivism
Centre Alliance	1 / 150	0 / 76	No leader	Social liberalism; Populism
David Pocock (Note: David Pocock was elected as a member of a political party also named "David Pocock," formed to allow him to appear as an above-the-line group on the Senate ballot. He is listed as an independent by the parliamentary website; however, the party remains registered, and the AEC lists David Pocock as a parliamentary party.)	0 / 150	1 / 76	David Pocock	Progressivism
Jacqui Lambie Network	0 / 150	1 / 76	Jacqui Lambie	Populism; Social conservatism
Katter's Australian Party	1 / 150	0 / 76	Robbie Katter	Populism; Agrarian socialism
United Australia Party	0 / 150	1 / 76	Ralph Babet	Australian nationalism; Right-wing populism

=== Federal non-parliamentary parties ===
Parties listed in alphabetical order as of September 2026:

Name	Leader(s)	Ideology
Animal Justice Party	Angela Pollard	Animal welfare
Australian Christians	Maryka Groenewald	Christian right
Australian Citizens Party	Craig Isherwood	LaRouchism
Australian Democrats	Lyn Allison	Social liberalism
Better Together Party	Lucy Bradlow; Bronwen Bock	Progressivism
Family First Party	Lyle Shelton	Social conservatism
The Great Australian Party	Rod Culleton	Right-wing populism
HEART Party	Michael O'Neill	Anti-vaccination
Indigenous-Aboriginal Party	Uncle Owen Whyman	Indigenous rights
Legalise Cannabis	Michael Balderstone	Cannabis legalisation
Libertarian Party	Anthony Bull	Right-libertarianism
People First Party	Gerard Rennick	Conservatism
Power 2 People	Tristan Van Rye	Right-wing populism
Shooters, Fishers and Farmers Party	Robert Brown	Conservatism
Socialist Alliance	Jacob Andrewartha; Sarah Hathway; Sam Wainwright	Eco-socialism
Sustainable Australia Party	Celeste Ackerly	Environmentalism
Australian Federation Party	Suellen Wrightson	Trumpism
Victorian Socialists	Collective leadership	Democratic socialism
votefusion.org	Drew Wolfendale	Secular humanism
Western Sydney Community	Dai Le; Frank Carbone	Western Sydney localism

== State and territory parties ==
=== New South Wales ===
As of the New South Wales Electoral Commission:

==== Parliamentary parties ====
Name		MPs	MLCs	Leader	Ideology
NSW Labor		46 / 93	15 / 42	Chris Minns	Social democracy
Coalition	Liberal Party	24 / 93	9 / 42	Kellie Sloane	Liberal conservatism
Coalition	National Party	11 / 93	5 / 42	Gurmesh Singh	Conservatism; Agrarianism
The Greens NSW		3 / 93	4 / 42	No leader	Green politics Progressivism
Shooters, Fishers and Farmers Party		0 / 93	2 / 42	Robert Borsak	Conservatism
Animal Justice Party		0 / 93	1 / 42	Emma Hurst	Animal welfare
Australian Citizens Party		0 / 93	1 / 42	Taylor Martin	LaRouchism; Australian nationalism
Legalise Cannabis		0 / 93	1 / 42	Jeremy Buckingham	Cannabis legalisation
Libertarian Party		0 / 93	1 / 42	John Ruddick	Right-libertarianism

==== Non-parliamentary parties ====
Name	Registered officer	Ideology
Australian Christians	Karl Schubert	Conservatism; Christian Right
Family First Party	Barbara Helvadjian	Conservatism
HEART Party	Michael O'Neill	Anti-vaccination
Josh for NSW	Marie Xenos	Social liberalism Independent Politician; Community advocacy
One Nation	Pauline Hanson	Hansonism
New South Wales Soc	Eleanor Morley	Socialism anti-capitalism
Public Education Party	Glen Stelzer	Single-issue politics
Socialist Alliance	Federico Fuentes	Anti-capitalism
Sustainable Australia Party	William Bourke	Environmentalism
The Rural Party	Brian Roberts	Agrarianism
The Small Business Party	Eddie Dogramaci	Small business advocacy

=== Victoria ===
As of the Victorian Electoral Commission:

==== Parliamentary parties ====
Name		MLAs	MLCs	Leader	Ideology
Victorian Labor		54 / 88	15 / 40	Ben Carroll	Social democracy
Coalition	Liberal Victoria	20 / 88	12 / 40	Jess Wilson	Liberal conservatism
Coalition	Victorian Nationals	9 / 88	2 / 40	Danny O'Brien	Conservatism; Agrarianism
Victorian Greens		3 / 88	4 / 40	Ellen Sandell	Green politics Progressivism
Legalise Cannabis Victoria		0 / 88	2 / 40	No leader	Cannabis legalisation
Libertarian Party		0 / 88	1 / 40	David Limbrick	Right-libertarianism
Shooters, Fishers and Farmers Party		0 / 88	1 / 40	Jeff Bourman	Conservatism
One Nation		0 / 88	1 / 40	Warren Pickering	Hansonism
Animal Justice Party		0 / 88	1 / 40	Georgie Purcell	Animal welfare

==== Non-parliamentary parties ====
Name	Leader	Ideology
Australian Citizens Party	No leader	LaRouchism
Australian Democrats	Ryan Parris	Liberalism (Australian); Social liberalism
Christian Alliance Party – Reform AU	John Hutchison	
Climate Action Now	Monica Smit	Preference Harvesting for One Nation
Democratic Labour Party	No leader	Social conservatism
Family First Party	Lyle Shelton	Christian right
Free Palestine	Avi Yemini	Preference Harvesting for One Nation
I'm Voting to Avoid the Fine	Daniel Smit	Preference Harvesting
Put Australia First	Kaushaliya Vaghela	Anti-corruption
Safety Victoria – Violent Crime Prevention	Morgan Jonas	Anti-lockdown politics
Sustainable Australia Party	Clifford Hayes	Environmentalism
The Republican Make Australia Great Again	Raj Kumar Saini	
The West Party		Community advocacy
Victorian Socialists	No leader	Democratic socialism

=== Queensland ===
As of the Queensland Electoral Commission:

==== Parliamentary parties ====
Name	MPs	Leader	Ideology
Liberal National Party	52 / 93	David Crisafulli	Liberal conservatism
Queensland Labor	35 / 93	Steven Miles	Social democracy
Katter's Australian Party	3 / 93	Robbie Katter	Populism; Agrarian socialism
Queensland Greens	1 / 93	No leader	Green politics

==== Non-parliamentary parties ====
Name	Leader	Ideology
Animal Justice Party	No leader	Animal welfare
Family First Party	Lyle Shelton	Christian right
Legalise Cannabis Queensland	Melody Lindsay	Cannabis legalisation
Libertarian Party	No leader	Right-libertarianism
One Nation	James Ashby	Hansonism
Queensland Socialists	No leader	Democratic socialism

=== Western Australia ===
As of the Western Australian Electoral Commission:

==== Parliamentary parties ====
Name	MLAs	MLCs	Leader	Ideology
WA Labor	45 / 59	16 / 37	Roger Cook	Social democracy
Liberal Party Western Australia	7 / 59	10 / 37	Basil Zempilas	Liberal conservatism
The Nationals WA	6 / 59	2 / 37	Shane Love	Conservatism; Agrarianism
The Greens (WA)	0 / 59	4 / 37	Brad Pettitt	Green politics
One Nation	1 / 59	2 / 37	Rod Caddies	Hansonism
Legalise Cannabis Party WA	0 / 59	1 / 37	Brian Walker	Cannabis legalisation
Australian Christians	0 / 59	1 / 37	Jamie van Burgel	Christian right
Animal Justice Party	0 / 59	1 / 37	No leader	Animal welfare

==== Non-parliamentary parties ====
Name	Leader	Ideology
Libertarian Party	No leader	Right-libertarianism
Shooters, Fishers and Farmers	Rick Mazza	Conservatism
Socialist Alliance WA	No leader	Eco-socialism
Stop Pedophiles! Protect kiddies!	No leader	—N/a
Sustainable Australia Party – Anti-corruption	No leader	—N/a
Western Australia Party	No leader	—N/a

=== South Australia ===
As of the Electoral Commission of South Australia:

==== Parliamentary parties ====
Party	MHAs	MLCs	Leader	Ideology
SA Labor	34 / 47	10 / 22	Peter Malinauskas	Social democracy
South Australian Liberal Party	5 / 47	6 / 22	Ashton Hurn	Liberal conservatism
One Nation	4 / 47	3 / 22	Cory Bernardi	Hansonism
Australian Greens SA	0 / 47	2 / 22	No leader	Green politics
Family First Party	0 / 47	1 / 22	Sarah Game	Christian right

==== Non-parliamentary parties ====
Name	Leader	Ideology
Animal Justice Party	No leader	Animal welfare
Australian Citizens Party	No leader	LaRouchism
Australian Family Party	No leader	Right-wing populism
For Unley	No leader	Localism
Legalise Cannabis SA	No leader	Cannabis legalisation
Libertarian Party SA	No leader	Right-libertarianism
National Party of Australia (SA)	No leader	Conservatism; Agrarianism
Real Change SA	Stephen Pallaras	—N/a
Sarah Game Fair Go	No leader	—N/a
SA Socialists	Tom Gilchrist	Socialism
United Voice Australia	Mark Aldridge	—N/a

=== Tasmania ===
As of the Tasmanian Electoral Commission:

==== Parliamentary parties ====
Name	MHAs	MLCs	Leader	Ideology
Liberal Party	14 / 35	4 / 15	Jeremy Rockliff	Liberal conservatism
Tasmanian Labor	10 / 35	3 / 15	Dean Winter	Social democracy
Tasmanian Greens	5 / 35	1 / 15	Rosalie Woodruff	Green politics
Shooters, Fishers and Farmers Party	1 / 35	0 / 15	Carlo Di Falco	Conservatism

==== Non-parliamentary parties ====
Name	Leader	Ideology
Animal Justice Party	No leader	Animal welfare
Tasmanian National Party	No leader	Conservatism
One Nation	Lee Hanson	Hansonism

=== Australian Capital Territory ===
As listed with the ACT Electoral Commission:

==== Parliamentary parties ====
Name	MLAs	Leader	Ideology
ACT Labor	10 / 25	Andrew Barr	Social democracy
Liberal Party	8 / 25	Mark Parton	Liberal conservatism
ACT Greens	4 / 25	Jo Clay	Green politics
Fiona Carrick Independent	1 / 25	Fiona Carrick	—N/a

==== Non-parliamentary parties ====
Name	Leader	Ideology
Animal Justice Party	No leader	Animal welfare
Belco Party	Bill Stefaniak	—N/a
The Community Action Party	No leader	—N/a
Democratic Labour Party	No leader	Social conservatism
Family First Party	No leader	Christian right
Libertarian Party	No leader	Right-libertarianism
Australian Multicultural Party	No leader	—N/a
Canberra Progressives	Kerry Markoulli	Progressivism
Sustainable Australia Party	No leader	Environmentalism
Canberra Socialists	No leader	Socialism

=== Northern Territory ===
As of the Northern Territory Electoral Commission:

==== Parliamentary parties ====
Name	MLAs	Leader	Ideology
Country Liberal Party	17 / 25	Lia Finocchiaro	Conservatism
Territory Labor Party	5 / 25	Selena Uibo	Social democracy

==== Non-parliamentary parties ====
Name	Leader	Ideology
Australian Federation Party	No leader	Conservatism
NT Greens	No leader	Green politics

== See also ==
- List of political parties by country
- Politics of Australia
