= 2025 Prahran state by-election =

- 8 February 2025

Electoral district of Prahran in the Victorian Legislative Assembly
- Registered: 48,164
- Turnout: 68.28%
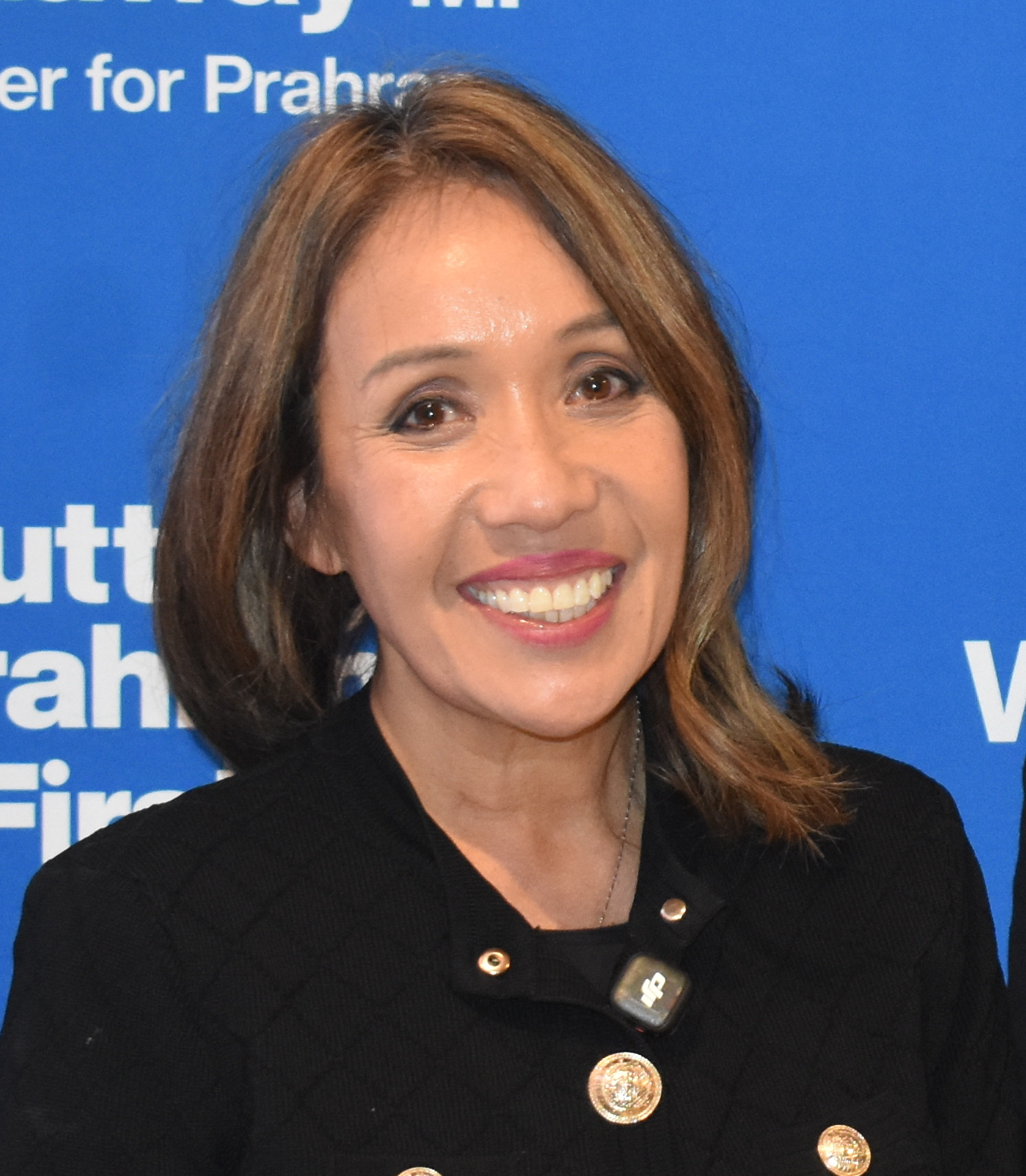

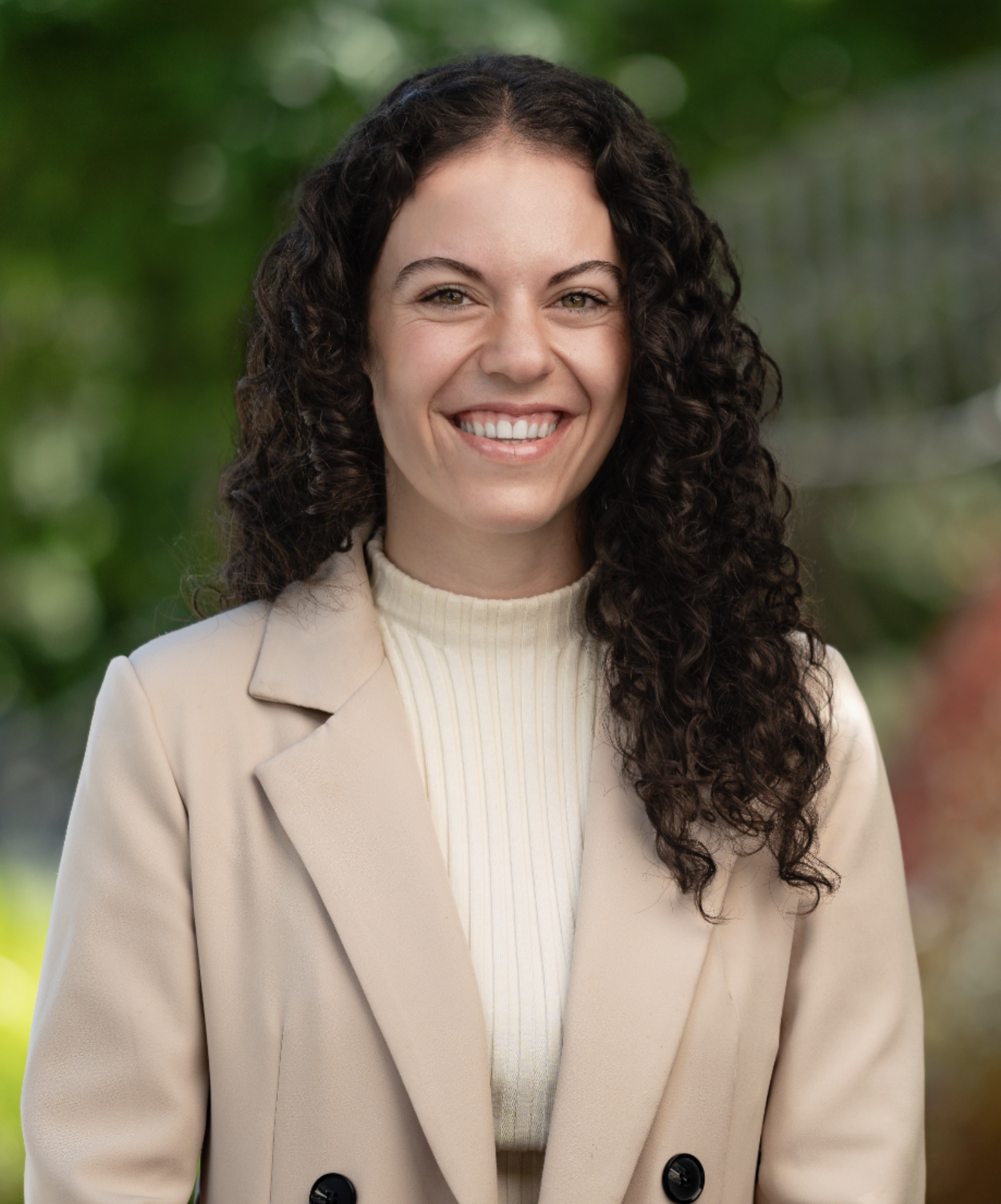

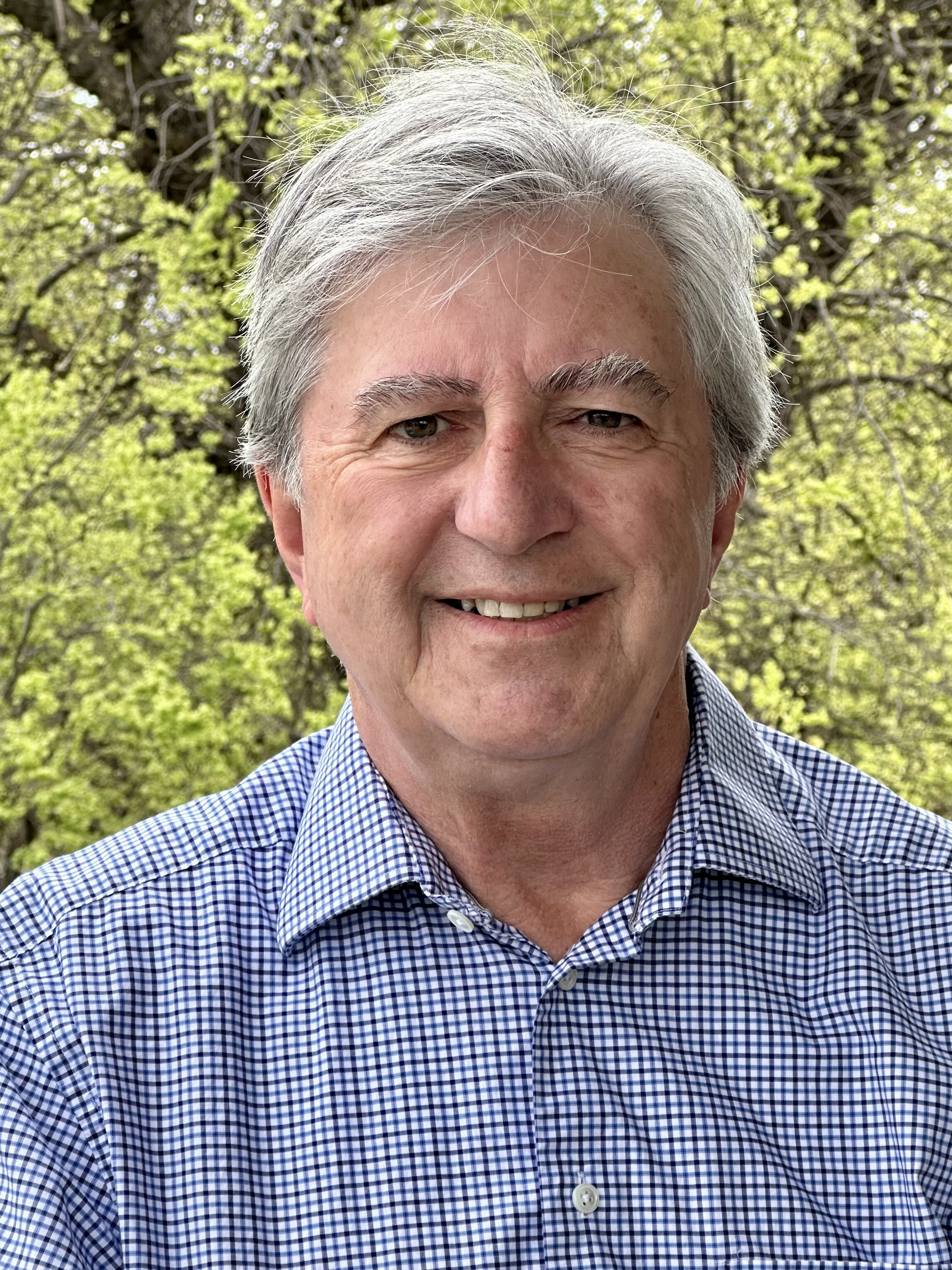
	First party	Second party	Third party
Candidate	Rachel Westaway	Angelica Di Camillo	Tony Lupton
Party	Liberal	Greens	Independent
Primary vote	11,443	11,442	4,021
Percentage	36.19%	36.19%	12.72%
Swing	▲5.1	▼0.2	▲12.7
TCP	51.35%	48.65%
TCP swing	▲13.4	▼13.4
- Location of the electoral district of Prahran
MP before election
Sam Hibbins
Independent
Elected MP
Rachel Westaway
Liberal

The 2025 Prahran state by-election was held on 8 February 2025 to elect the member for Prahran in the Victorian Legislative Assembly, following the resignation of incumbent MP Sam Hibbins, who had held the seat for the Victorian Greens since the 2014 election. The poll took place on the same day as a by-election for Werribee.

Hibbins resigned from the Greens on 1 November 2024, after it emerged that he had engaged in an extramarital affair with a staff member from his office, which he described as a "human mistake". He moved to the crossbench and sat as an independent until delivering his resignation as a member of parliament on 23 November 2024.

The by-election was won by Liberal candidate Rachel Westaway with a two-candidate-preferred vote swing of 13.6% against the Greens. Greens leader Ellen Sandell conceded defeat the day after the by-election, blaming the loss on preference flows and the by-election's timing.

== Background ==
=== Seat details ===
Prahran is an electoral district in the inner-southern suburbs of Melbourne, encompassing the suburbs of South Yarra, Windsor, parts of St Kilda and St Kilda East. The seat has existed since 1889 and has experienced notable political shifts over the years. In 1951, the seat saw a by-election which was won by the Victorian Labor Party. Historically, the electorate has alternated between the Labor and Liberal parties. However, in 2014, the Greens made a significant breakthrough when Sam Hibbins won the seat, despite finishing third in the primary vote, by securing preferences from the two major parties. Before his resignation, Hibbins would go on to retain the seat for the Greens at the time, narrowly in 2018 and increasing the party's margin in 2022.

Demographically, Prahran is one of Victoria's more affluent electorates. At the time of the 2021 Australian census, the seat had a median weekly personal income of $1,330, significantly higher than the state ($803) and national ($805) averages. More than half of residents hold a bachelor’s degree or higher (53.5%), and the median age of residents (35) is slightly younger than both the state and national rates (38).

=== Electoral history ===
Two-candidate preferred vote in Prahran, 1992–2022
Election	1992	1996	1999	2002	2006	2010	2014	2018	2022
Liberal	57.80%	54.60%	54.00%	45.60%	46.40%	54.80%	49.63%	42.55%	38.00%
Labor	42.20%	45.40%	46.00%	54.40%	53.60%	45.20%	—N/a	—N/a	—N/a
Greens	—N/a	—N/a	—N/a	—N/a	—N/a	—N/a	50.37%	57.45%	62.00%
Government	L/NP	L/NP	ALP	ALP	ALP	L/NP	ALP	ALP	ALP

=== 2022 election results ===
2022 Victorian state election: Prahran
Party	Candidate	Votes	%	±%
Greens	Sam Hibbins	14,286	36.4	+8.1
Liberal	Matthew Lucas	12,198	31.1	−1.6
Labor	Wesa Chau	10,421	26.6	−3.9
Animal Justice	Alice Le Huray	1,263	3.2	+0.9
Family First	Ronald Emilsen	626	1.6	+1.6
Independent	Alan Menadue	449	1.1	+0.8
Total formal votes		39,243	97.0	+2.1
Informal votes		1,223	3.0	−2.1
Turnout		40,466	82.7	−1.6
Notional two-party-preferred count
Labor	Wesa Chau	23,966	61.1	+2.4
Liberal	Matthew Lucas	15,277	38.9	–2.4
Two-candidate-preferred result
Greens	Sam Hibbins	24,334	62.0	+3.0
Liberal	Matthew Lucas	14,909	38.0	−3.0
Greens hold		Swing	+3.0	

== Key events ==
- 23 November 2024 − Sam Hibbins resigns
- 27 December 2024 − Close of electoral roll
- 29 January 2025 − Early voting begins
- 8 February 2025 − Polling day

== Candidates ==
Candidates are listed in the order they appeared on the ballot.

Party	Candidate	Background
Independent	Nathan Chisholm	Principal of Prahran High School
Liberal	Rachel Westaway	Administrative Appeals Tribunal member
Independent	Janine Hendry	2021 March 4 Justice organiser
Family First	Geneviève Gilbert	Founder of Pink Cross Foundation Australia
Independent	Alan Menadue	Retired RAAF supply manager, candidate for Prahran in 2014, 2018, and 2022
Independent	Tony Lupton	Former Labor MP for Prahran (2002–2010)
Libertarian	Mark Dessau	
Greens	Angelica Di Camillo	Environmental engineer and 2023 Aston by-election candidate
Sustainable Australia	Dennis Bilic	
Independent	Buzz Billman	Train driver, actor, former Labor member and former Greens candidate
Animal Justice	Faith Fuhrer	Candidate for Hawthorn in 2022

=== Greens ===
On 2 December 2024, the Victorian Greens announced their candidate as environmental engineer Angelica Di Camillo. Di Camillo was the Greens candidate at the 2023 Aston by-election, and was also preselected by the party to contest the electorate of Higgins at the 2025 federal election prior to the seat's abolition.

=== Liberal ===
Victorian Liberal Party leader John Pesutto announced on 25 November 2024 that the party would contest Prahran, having last held the seat with Clem Newton-Brown from 2010 to 2014. Rachel Westaway, a member of the Administrative Appeals Tribunal and previously an unsuccessful Liberal candidate for the New South Wales Legislative Council at the 2003 state election, was preselected as the party's candidate on 15 December 2024.

=== Labor ===
On 27 November 2024, state premier and Labor leader Jacinta Allan announced that the party would not field a candidate at the by-election. The party last held Prahran from 2002 to 2010 with Tony Lupton and was narrowly defeated by Hibbins at the 2014 Victorian state election. This was the first election in Prahran history, not to have a Labor candidate running. However, Lupton himself recontested the seat as an independent, citing community support for his candidacy.

== How-to-vote cards ==
Candidates can provide how-to-vote cards with recommendations for voters on how to preference other parties. Nathan Chisholm, Alan Menadue and the Sustainable Australia Party did not recommend any preferences. Additionally, conservative lobby group Advance registered a how-to-vote card, calling for Greens candidate Angelica Di Camillo to be preferenced last.

Candidate	How-to-vote card (read column top down)										
Candidate	Chi	LIB	Hen	FFP	Men	Lup.	LBT	GRN	SAP	Bil.	AJP
Nathan Chisholm (Ind.)	1	3	9	7		5	4	4		9	5
Rachel Westaway (LIB)		1	10	4		2	6	9		10	9
Janine Hendry (Ind.)		6	1	9		3	8	3		2	3
Geneviève Gilbert (FFP)		5	11	1		10	2	11		11	11
Alan Menadue (Ind.)		7	5	3	1	6	5	6		3	10
Tony Lupton (Ind.)		2	4	5		1	3	7		8	7
Mark Dessau (LBT)		4	8	2		7	1	10		7	8
Angelica Di Camillo (GRN)		11	7	11		11	11	1		6	2
Dennis Bilic (SAP)		9	6	6		9	7	8	1	5	6
Buzz Billman (Ind.)		8	2	8		4	10	5		1	4
Faith Fuhrer (AJP)		10	3	10		8	9	2		4	1

== Results ==
2025 Prahran state by-election
Party	Candidate	Votes	%	±%
Liberal	Rachel Westaway	11,443	36.19	+5.11
Greens	Angelica Di Camillo	11,442	36.19	−0.21
Independent	Tony Lupton	4,021	12.72	+12.72
Independent	Nathan Chisholm	1,672	5.29	+5.29
Animal Justice	Faith Fuhrer	879	2.78	−0.44
Independent	Janine Hendry	505	1.60	+1.60
Independent	Buzz Billman	465	1.47	+1.47
Sustainable Australia	Dennis Bilic	430	1.36	+1.36
Family First	Geneviève Gilbert	340	1.08	−0.52
Libertarian	Mark Dessau	292	0.92	+0.92
Independent	Alan Menadue	126	0.40	−0.74
Total formal votes		31,615	96.14	−0.84
Informal votes		1,271	3.86	+0.84
Turnout		32,886	68.28	−14.42
Two-candidate-preferred result
Liberal	Rachel Westaway	16,234	51.35	+13.36
Greens	Angelica Di Camillo	15,381	48.65	−13.36
Liberal gain from Greens		Swing	+13.36	

== See also ==
- Electoral results for the district of Prahran
- List of Victorian state by-elections
