= Emma Vulin =

Australian politician

Emma Vulin MP
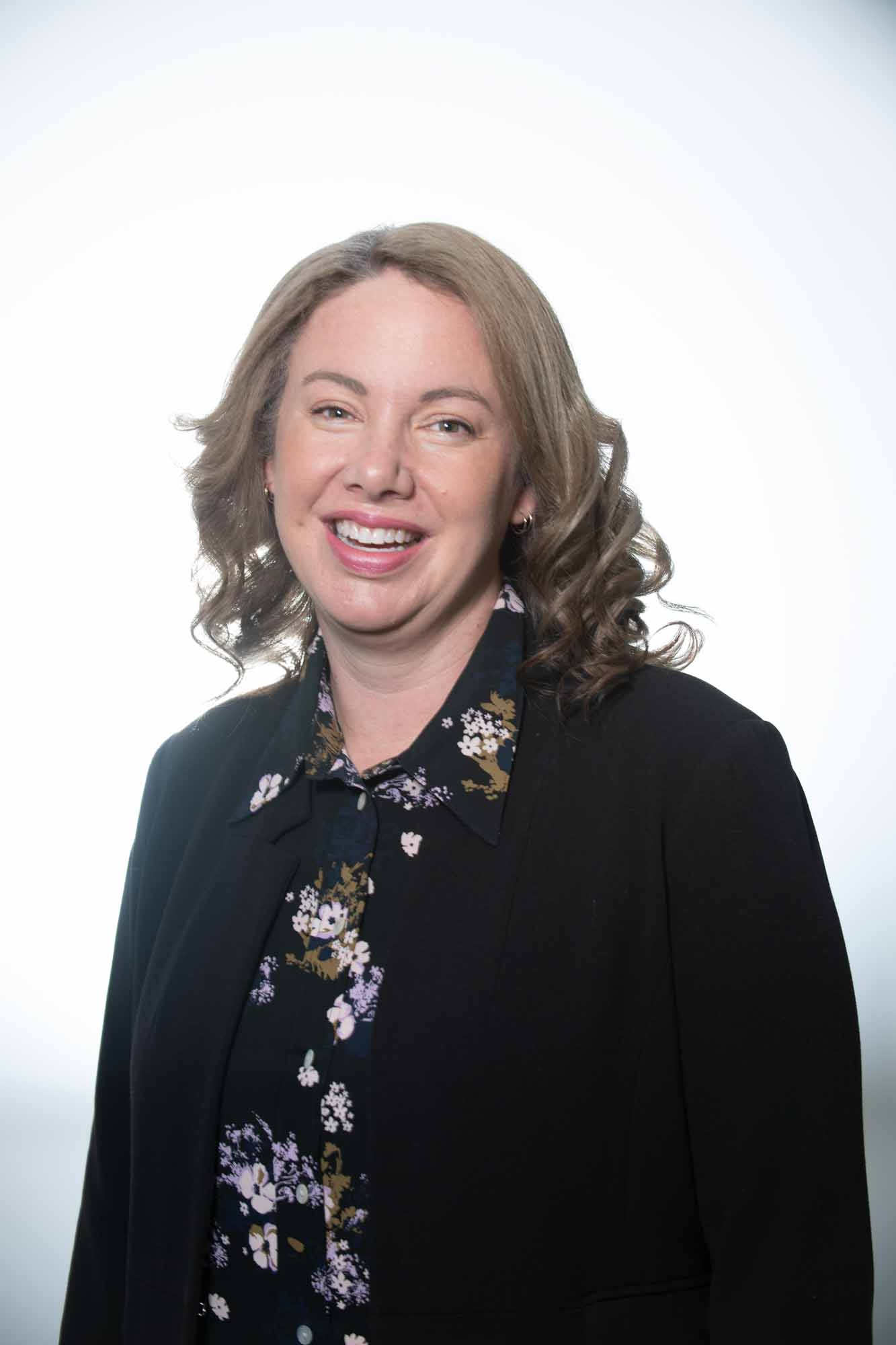
- Emma Vulin in 2024

Member of the Victorian Legislative Assembly for Pakenham
- Incumbent
- Assumed office 26 November 2022

Personal details
- Born: c. 1980 (age 45–46)
- Party: Labor Party

Emma Vulin (born c. 1980) is an Australian politician. She has been a Labor Party member of the Victorian Legislative Assembly since November 2022, representing the seat of Pakenham.

== Early life ==
Prior to entering Parliament, Vulin worked variously in retail, as an electorate officer for state and federal Labor MPs, and as a veterinary nurse. She also volunteered at her local Country Fire Authority brigade.

== Parliamentary career ==
Vulin won the newly created division of Pakenham at the 2022 Victorian state election, winning the seat with a 0.4% margin, after leading on primary votes.

On 30 September 2025, Vulin announced that she would not recontest her seat at the 2026 Victorian state election.

== Personal life ==
In 2016, Vulin suffered a stroke at age 36 and recovered to return to work and run for parliament. In 2024, she announced that she had been diagnosed with early-stage Motor Neurone Disease.

She lives in Pakenham.
