= Hutch Hussein =

Australian politician, feminist, activist and social worker

Hatice "Hutch" Hussein is an Australian feminist, activist, and social worker. She served as the elected State President of the Victorian branch of the Australian Labor Party (ALP) between 2016 and 2019. Upon taking this role, she became the first President in the party's 125-year history to be from an ethnic minority background, from a Muslim background, and from the LGBT community.

Hussein has also co-convened EMILY's List Australia to get progressive Labor women into Parliament and was a Founding Board Member for the Women's Rights Action Network - Australia (WRANA). Hussein has also worked for the Northern Migrant Resource Centre in Melbourne, and as a Ministerial Adviser in Education and Women's Affairs.

In 2019, Hussein called on members of the Victorian Labor to support women who have launched complaints of bullying and sexual harassment within the party.

At the 2022 Victorian state election Hussein ran unsuccessfully as the Labor candidate for the Electoral district of Polwarth, a district represented by conservative parties for over a century. In April 2026, she is again contesting in this electorate.

== Personal life ==
Hussein was born to Turkish Cypriot parents. Her father, Niyazi, was a trained mechanic who fled to Australia from Cyprus in 1970 when the Cyprus conflict escalated. Her mother, Nahide, worked at a television factory upon moving to Australia. Hussein worked in NGO organisations before becoming pre selected for the 2022 Victorian state election.

Hussein regards herself as a "cultural Muslim". She is a mother and a lesbian.
