= Monica Smit =

Australian anti-lockdown protester

Monica Smit (born 1987 or 1988) is an Australian anti-vaccine and anti-lockdown protester. She is the founder of Reignite Democracy Australia (RDA). She gained prominence during the COVID-19 pandemic as a critic of the Victorian Government's response.

In 2021, Smit was charged for attending, and allegedly inciting others to attend anti-lockdown protests and spent 22 days in custody after initially refusing her bail conditions. The incitement charges were withdrawn the following year. In 2024, she and RDA were found guilty of running an unregistered fundraiser for her legal defence. After suing Victoria Police for false imprisonment, the County Court of Victoria awarded her $4,000, though she was ordered to pay about $250,000 in costs.

Following the COVID-19 pandemic, Smit has been involved in organising anti-immigration rallies. She has also sought to register political parties for the 2026 Victorian state election in order to harvest votes for other parties.

== Early life and career ==
Monica Smit was born in 1987 or 1988 (age 38–39). She is the child of immigrant parents. Her mother was raised in Canada, and her father in the Netherlands. In 2017, Smit auditioned for Survivor. She advanced to the second round of casting but did not secure a spot on the show. In her audition video, Smit said that she "didn't hate being the centre of attention". Prior to her audition she worked in sales for a decade.

== Activities ==
=== Early activism and arrest ===
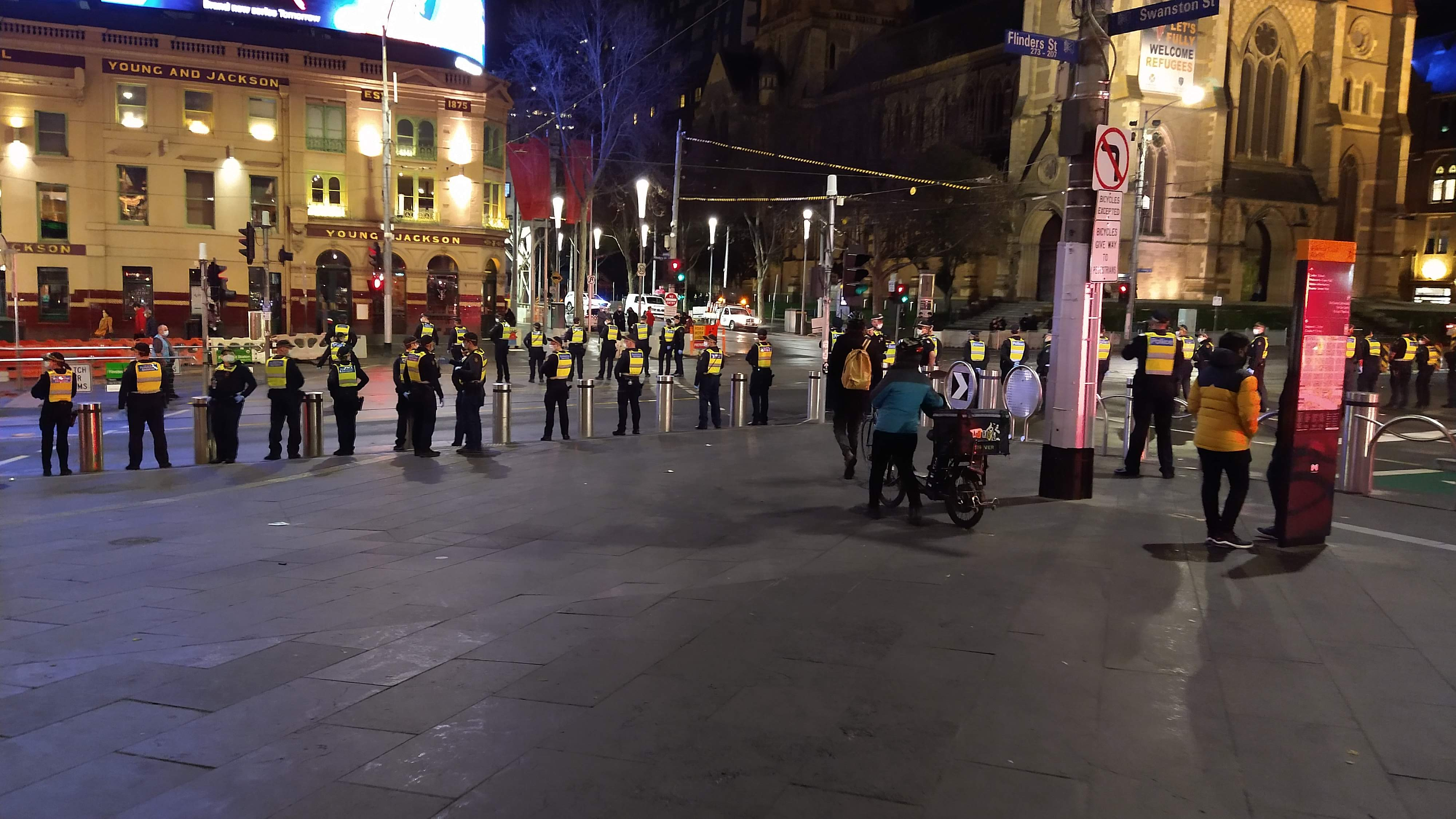
Police presence after an anti-lockdown protest in Melbourne in August 2021

Smit is an anti-vaccine and anti-lockdown protester. She gained prominence during the COVID-19 pandemic as a critic of the Victorian Government's response. In 2020, she founded Reignite Democracy Australia (RDA), a group that campaigned against the Victorian Government's COVID-19 lockdowns and restrictions under Premier Daniel Andrews. The Sydney Morning Herald has described the group as promoting COVID-19 conspiracy theories. RDA used social media platforms to organise protests and encourage public dissent against government-imposed health measures. Smit gained significant attention in October 2020 when she promoted a bus, which drove around Melbourne, calling for the sacking of Andrews.

In August 2021, Smit was arrested and charged with two counts of incitement for allegedly encouraging others to breach public health orders by attending anti-lockdown protests. She was also charged with three counts of breaching the Chief Health Officer's Directions. Smit refused bail conditions that included a curfew and the removal of some of her social media material, resulting in her detention. She spent 22 days in custody until the Supreme Court of Victoria granted her bail on more limited conditions. In July 2022, prosecutors withdrew the incitement charges against Smit.

=== Fundraising and legal consequences ===
Upon Smit's remand in 2021, Morgan Jonas, also a critic of the Victorian government's COVID-19 response, launched a crowdfunding campaign aimed at covering her legal expenses. The campaign raised A$247,000 within five days, despite some of Smit's legal representation being provided pro bono.

In October 2023, Smit and RDA were charged by Consumer Affairs Victoria with failing to register a fundraiser for Smit's legal defence. According to The Australian, the campaign had raised $86,000 between September 2021 and October 2022 for Smit's legal defence. Smit's lawyer argued in court that the campaign did not meet the definition of a fundraiser. In May 2024, the Melbourne Magistrates' Court found both Smit and RDA guilty of running the unregistered fundraiser.

=== Lawsuit against Victoria Police ===
In 2022 Smit told the media that she intended to take legal action against Victoria Police over the 22 days she had spent in custody. Prior to the trial, she turned down a settlement offer of $15,000. In September 2024, in a false imprisonment case over her arrests at a protest in October 2020, Smit was awarded $4,000 by the County Court of Victoria after it ruled that she had been falsely imprisoned on two occasions during a protest on 31 October 2020. However, Smit's decision to reject the pre-trial settlement offer led to the court ordering her to pay about $250,000 for Victoria Police's legal costs.

=== Anti-immigration campaigning ===
Smit organised anti-immigration rallies to be held at the end of November 2025 in Sydney, Melbourne and Brisbane. The Put Australia First rallies followed March for Australia protests in August which were promoted and attended by neo-Nazis. Organisers for the rallies stated that the rallies were not connected and that neo-Nazis would not be welcome. On 29 November 2025, far-right figure Tommy Robinson attended the Sydney protest by dial-in. Northern Territory Senator Jacinta Price was due to attend the Sydney protest; however, she withdrew after her office received media enquiries about Robinson's attendance.

Pauline Hanson spoke at the Put Australia First rally in Melbourne on 30 November 2025, where she blamed "multiculturalism and globalisation" for "dividing us". Smit was at the front of the rally behind a banner.

=== 2026 Victorian state election ===
In 2026, Smit tried to form a party called Save the Environment party for the 2026 Victorian state election. She also registered a party named Climate Action Now. On social media, Smit has said that she was creating "minor parties with catchy names so that uneducated voters see a name they like and put a one next to it, and they have no idea that this is actually just harvesting votes for someone else". The ABC described her use of minor parties with catchy names to direct voters' preferences to other parties as an attempt to trick voters.

== See also ==
- Freedom Party of Victoria
