= Mathew Hilakari =

Australian politician

Mathew Hilakari MP
- Hilakari in 2026

Member of the Victorian Legislative Assembly for Point Cook
- Incumbent
- Assumed office 26 November 2022
- Preceded by: new constituency

Parliamentary Secretary for Education
- Incumbent
- Assumed office 7 August 2026
- Minister: Gabrielle Williams
- Premier: Ben Carroll
- Preceded by: Nina Taylor

Personal details
- Party: Labor
- Education: Monash University
- Occupation: Politician; Writer; Researcher

Mathew Hilakari is an Australian politician who is the current member for Point Cook in the Victorian Legislative Assembly. He is a member of the Labor Party and was elected in the 2022 state election.

== Career ==
Hilakari was the state convener and powerbroker of the Socialist Left faction of the Victorian Labor Party prior to his election. He was preselected to contest Point Cook at the 2022 election, despite living outside the electorate in Seaford in Melbourne's south-eastern suburbs. Hilakari moved into the electorate after winning preselection.

Since February 2023, Hilakari has been a member of the Public Accounts and Estimates Committee and a member (later chair) of the Electoral Matters Committee since June 2026 in the Parliament of Victoria.

On the 7th of August 2026, Hilakari was announced to be the new Parliamentary Secretary for Education due to a cabinet reshuffle as a result of Ben Carroll becoming Premier of Victoria.

== Early life ==
Born in Victoria to Finnish and English immigrant parents, Hilakari grew up in Templestowe Lower. His mother worked as a nurse and his father was a park ranger.

Hilakari attended public schools, graduating from Templestowe College. While completing his schooling, he worked as a cleaner at the Melbourne Cricket Ground. He later earned a double degree from Monash University.

Hilakari's brother, Luke is the Secretary of the Victorian Trades Hall Council.
