= Electoral district of Point Cook =

State electoral district of Victoria, Australia

Point Cook Victoria—Legislative Assembly
- Interactive map of electoral district boundaries from the 2022 state election
- State: Victoria
- Created: 2022
- MP: Mathew Hilakari
- Party: Labor Party
- Namesake: Point Cook, Victoria
- Electors: 48,572
- Area: 88 km^{2} (34.0 sq mi)
- Demographic: Urban

The Electoral district of Point Cook is an electoral district of the Victorian Legislative Assembly in Australia. It was created in the redistribution of electoral boundaries in 2021, and came into effect at the 2022 Victorian state election.

It largely covers the area of the abolished district of Altona, covering south western suburbs of Melbourne. It includes the suburbs of Altona Meadows, Seabrook, Point Cook, and Werribee South.

The abolished seat of Altona was held by Labor MP Jill Hennessy from 2010 to 2022.

== Members for Point Cook ==
Member	Party	Term
Mathew Hilakari	Labor	2022–present

== Election results ==
2022 Victorian state election: Point Cook
Party	Candidate	Votes	%	±%
Labor	Mathew Hilakari	15,657	40.0	−9.5
Liberal	Angela Newhouse	9,651	24.7	+0.5
Independent	Joe Garra	2,717	6.9	+6.9
Greens	Shamsher Khan	2,656	6.8	−1.1
Family First	Carolyn Cronkwright	1,496	3.8	+3.8
Victorian Socialists	Alex McAulay	1,399	3.6	+3.6
Democratic Labour	Daniel Hamman	1,369	3.5	+3.5
Independent	Larry Zhao	814	2.1	+2.1
Animal Justice	Terri Beech	804	2.1	+2.1
Freedom	Adrian Abdulovski	571	1.5	+1.5
Justice	Scott Grimley	514	1.3	+1.3
Independent	Shwetali Sawant	467	1.2	+1.2
Health Australia	Emma Law	383	1.0	+0.9
New Democrats	Rakhi P. Chaudhary	358	0.9	+0.9
Transport Matters	Lisa Jane Gatti	245	0.6	+0.6
Total formal votes		39,099	89.8	−4.8
Informal votes		4,448	10.2	+4.8
Turnout		43,547	87.5	+2.7
Two-party-preferred result
Labor	Mathew Hilakari	22,810	58.3	−4.4
Liberal	Angela Newhouse	16,289	41.7	+4.4
Labor hold		Swing	−4.4	

== See also ==
- Parliaments of the Australian states and territories
- List of members of the Victorian Legislative Assembly
