= Victorian Electoral Commission =

Agency overview
- Formed: 1 January 1989
- Preceding agency: State Electoral Office division, Department of Property and Services
- Jurisdiction: Government of Victoria
- Minister responsible: Ben Carroll, Premier of Victoria
- Agency executive: Sven Bluemmel, Electoral Commissioner
- Website: vec.vic.gov.au
- Agency ID: PROV VA 4196

The Victorian Electoral Commission (VEC), formerly the State Electoral Office, is the statutory body responsible for the running of state, municipal and various non-government elections in Victoria, Australia.

== Independence ==
Between 1855 and its abolition in 1979, the Chief Secretary's Department was responsible for electoral matters in Victoria. The public service head of the department was titled Undersecretary and Chief Electoral Officer until the Electoral Act 1910 established the Chief Electoral Officer as a separate position within the department.

The Chief Electoral Officer was reallocated to the Department of Property and Services in 1979, and the State Electoral Office was established as a division of that department to support them in performing their functions. The Chief Electoral Officer, a public servant, was replaced by the Electoral Commissioner of Victoria, an independent statutory official reporting directly to the state parliament by the Constitution Act Amendment (Electoral Reform) Act 1988. The appointment of the first Electoral Commissioner resulted in the State Electoral Office becoming an independent agency on 1 January 1989. It was renamed as the Victorian Electoral Commission in 1995.

The Victorian Electoral Commission is an independent agency, currently constituted under Victoria's Electoral Act 2002, the VEC falls under the umbrella of the Department of Premier and Cabinet. The VEC head office is located on level 11, 530 Collins Street, Melbourne, although during the state election there may be as many as 88 offices established throughout Victoria.

The VEC is subject to oversight by the Victorian Parliament's Electoral Matters Committee which regularly holds inquiries into the conduct of public elections and associated matters in Victoria. The committee was established under the Parliamentary Committees Act 2003 and has members from both the Legislative Assembly and the Legislative Council.

== Functions ==
=== State elections ===
The primary function of the VEC is to conduct Victorian state elections, the last of which was the 2022 state election which was held on Saturday, 26 November 2022. Prior to 2006, Victorian parliamentary elections could be held any time at the discretion of the government in the last year of their four-year term of office. This has meant that, in practice, the average period between elections had been somewhat less than the maximum four years. From 2006 the Victorian Parliament has fixed terms with the election being held every fourth year on the last Saturday in November.

=== Municipal elections ===
Municipal, or local government, elections are also conducted by the VEC in Victoria. Previously there was a system of competitive tendering between the Australian Electoral Commission (AEC) and the VEC, but the AEC withdrew. The VEC still submits tenders to each council to run the municipal elections. Municipal elections take place in October every four years. The most recent municipal elections took place in October 2024 and the next elections will be in October 2028.

=== Non-government elections ===
Private organisations may hire the VEC to conduct elections for them. These may include board elections.

=== Liquor licensing polls ===
Until December 2021, there were certain "dry areas" in the City of Whitehorse and City of Boroondara which required a poll to be conducted by the VEC before granting a liquor licence in that dry area. If a majority of electors in that area voted against the proposed licence, that licence was not granted and any other liquor licence applications were not allowed to be proposed in that area for 3 years. Following amendments to the Liquor Control Reform Act 1998, these dry areas were abolished so the polls no longer need to be conducted.

=== Electoral enrolment ===
The VEC's Electoral Enrolment Branch maintains the State electoral roll. Only Victoria and Western Australia maintain their own state rolls rather than depending on the Commonwealth rolls maintained by the AEC. The VEC still receives updates from the AEC to ensure that the Commonwealth and Victorian rolls mirror each other.

The VEC conducts several promotional programs to ensure that electors update their information when their enrolment details change.

=== Boundary redistributions ===
The VEC assists the Electoral Boundaries Commission in redistributing state electoral boundaries from time to time. It also performs similar tasks in relation to local government.

== See also ==
- Electoral systems of the Australian states and territories
- Parliaments of the Australian states and territories
- Politics of Victoria
