= Electoral results for the district of Prahran =

This is a list of electoral results for the district of Prahran in Victorian state elections.

== Members for Prahran ==
| Member | Party | Term |
|---|---|---|
| Edward Dixon | Independent | 1889–1894 |
| Frederick Gray | Labor | 1894–1900 |
| Donald Mackinnon | Liberal | 1900–1920 |
| Alexander Parker | Labor | 1920–1921 |
| Richard Fetherston | Nationalist | 1921–1924 |
| Arthur Jackson | Labor | 1924–1932 |
| John Ellis | United Australia | 1932–1945 |
| John Ellis | Liberal | 1945–1945 |
| Bill Quirk | Labor | 1945–1948 |
| Frank Crean | Labor | 1949–1951 |
| Robert Pettiona | Labor | 1951–1955 |
| Sam Loxton | Liberal | 1955–1979 |
| Bob Miller | Labor | 1979–1985 |
| Don Hayward | Liberal | 1985–1996 |
| Leonie Burke | Liberal | 1996–2002 |
| Tony Lupton | Labor | 2002–2010 |
| Clem Newton-Brown | Liberal | 2010–2014 |
| Sam Hibbins | Greens | 2014–2024 |
| Sam Hibbins | Independent | 2024–2024 |
| Rachel Westaway | Liberal | 2025–present |

== Election results ==
=== Elections in the 2020s ===
==== 2025 by-election ====
2025 Prahran state by-election
| Party | Candidate | Votes | % | ±% |
|---|---|---|---|---|
| Liberal | Rachel Westaway | 11,443 | 36.19 | +5.1 |
| Greens | Angelica Di Camillo | 11,442 | 36.19 | −0.2 |
| Independent | Tony Lupton | 4,021 | 12.72 | +12.7 |
| Independent | Nathan Chisholm | 1,672 | 5.29 | +5.3 |
| Animal Justice | Faith Fuhrer | 879 | 2.78 | −0.4 |
| Independent | Janine Hendry | 505 | 1.60 | +1.6 |
| Independent | Buzz Billman | 465 | 1.47 | +1.5 |
| Sustainable Australia | Dennis Bilic | 430 | 1.36 | +1.4 |
| Family First | Geneviève Gilbert | 340 | 1.08 | −0.5 |
| Libertarian | Mark Dessau | 292 | 0.92 | +0.9 |
| Independent | Alan Menadue | 126 | 0.40 | −0.7 |
| Total formal votes | | 31,615 | 96.1 | −0.8 |
| Informal votes | | 1,271 | 3.86 | +0.8 |
| Turnout | | 32,886 | 68.28 | −14.4 |
Two-candidate-preferred result
| Liberal | Rachel Westaway | 16,234 | 51.35 | +13.4 |
| Greens | Angelica Di Camillo | 15,381 | 48.65 | −13.4 |
| Liberal gain from Greens | | Swing | +13.4 | |

==== 2022 ====
2022 Victorian state election: Prahran
| Party | Candidate | Votes | % | ±% |
|---|---|---|---|---|
| Greens | Sam Hibbins | 14,286 | 36.4 | +8.1 |
| Liberal | Matthew Lucas | 12,198 | 31.1 | −1.6 |
| Labor | Wesa Chau | 10,421 | 26.6 | −3.9 |
| Animal Justice | Alice Le Huray | 1,263 | 3.2 | +0.9 |
| Family First | Ronald Emilsen | 626 | 1.6 | +1.6 |
| Independent | Alan Menadue | 449 | 1.1 | +0.8 |
| Total formal votes | | 39,243 | 97.0 | +2.1 |
| Informal votes | | 1,223 | 3.0 | −2.1 |
| Turnout | | 40,466 | 82.7 | −1.6 |
Notional two-party-preferred count
| Labor | Wesa Chau | 23,966 | 61.1 | +2.4 |
| Liberal | Matthew Lucas | 15,277 | 38.9 | –2.4 |
Two-candidate-preferred result
| Greens | Sam Hibbins | 24,334 | 62.0 | +3.0 |
| Liberal | Matthew Lucas | 14,909 | 38.0 | −3.0 |
| Greens hold | | Swing | +3.0 | |

=== Elections in the 2010s ===
==== 2018 ====
2018 Victorian state election: Prahran
| Party | Candidate | Votes | % | ±% |
|---|---|---|---|---|
| Liberal | Katie Allen | 13,956 | 34.53 | −10.29 |
| Labor | Neil Pharaoh | 11,702 | 28.95 | +3.04 |
| Greens | Sam Hibbins | 11,347 | 28.07 | +3.32 |
| Democratic Labour | Leon Kofmansky | 933 | 2.31 | +2.31 |
| Animal Justice | Jennifer Long | 900 | 2.23 | −0.04 |
| Reason | Tom Tomlin | 830 | 2.05 | +2.05 |
| Sustainable Australia | Dennis Bilic | 468 | 1.16 | +1.16 |
| Aussie Battler | Wendy Patterson | 156 | 0.39 | +0.39 |
| Independent | Alan Menadue | 130 | 0.32 | +0.10 |
| Total formal votes | | 40,422 | 94.77 | −0.12 |
| Informal votes | | 2,229 | 5.23 | +0.12 |
| Turnout | | 42,651 | 84.67 | −3.80 |
Two-party-preferred result
| Labor | Neil Pharaoh | 23,263 | 57.55 | +7.58 |
| Liberal | Katie Allen | 17,159 | 42.45 | −7.58 |
Two-candidate-preferred result
| Greens | Sam Hibbins | 23,224 | 57.45 | +7.08 |
| Liberal | Katie Allen | 17,198 | 42.55 | −7.08 |
| Greens hold | | Swing | +7.08 | |

==== 2014 ====
2014 Victorian state election: Prahran
| Party | Candidate | Votes | % | ±% |
|---|---|---|---|---|
| Liberal | Clem Newton-Brown | 16,582 | 44.8 | −2.8 |
| Labor | Neil Pharaoh | 9,586 | 25.9 | −1.5 |
| Greens | Sam Hibbins | 9,160 | 24.8 | +5.0 |
| Animal Justice | Eleonora Gullone | 837 | 2.3 | +2.3 |
| Family First | Alan Walker | 282 | 0.8 | +0.2 |
| Independent | Jason Simon Goldsmith | 247 | 0.7 | +0.7 |
| Independent | Steve Stefanopoulos | 227 | 0.6 | +0.6 |
| Independent | Alan Maxwell Menadue | 82 | 0.2 | +0.2 |
| Total formal votes | | 37,003 | 94.9 | −1.9 |
| Informal votes | | 1,991 | 5.1 | +1.9 |
| Turnout | | 38,994 | 88.5 | +4.4 |
Notional two-party-preferred count
| Liberal | Clem Newton-Brown | 18,580 | 50.03 | −4.6 |
| Labor | Neil Pharaoh | 18,555 | 49.97 | +4.6 |
Two-candidate-preferred result
| Greens | Sam Hibbins | 18,640 | 50.4 | +50.4 |
| Liberal | Clem Newton-Brown | 18,363 | 49.6 | −5.1 |
| Greens gain from Liberal | | Swing | +5.1 | |

==== 2010 ====
2010 Victorian state election: Prahran
| Party | Candidate | Votes | % | ±% |
|---|---|---|---|---|
| Liberal | Clem Newton-Brown | 16,197 | 47.95 | +6.08 |
| Labor | Tony Lupton | 9,384 | 27.78 | −8.94 |
| Greens | Meni Christofakis | 6,685 | 19.79 | −0.34 |
| Sex Party | Christian Vega | 1,073 | 3.18 | +3.18 |
| Independent | Katharine Anderson | 239 | 0.71 | +0.71 |
| Family First | Simon Ronchi | 198 | 0.59 | −0.69 |
| Total formal votes | | 33,776 | 96.77 | +0.46 |
| Informal votes | | 1,128 | 3.23 | −0.46 |
| Turnout | | 34,904 | 88.91 | +3.94 |
Two-party-preferred result
| Liberal | Clem Newton-Brown | 18,460 | 54.80 | +8.33 |
| Labor | Tony Lupton | 15,226 | 45.20 | −8.33 |
| Liberal gain from Labor | | Swing | +8.33 | |

=== Elections in the 2000s ===
==== 2006 ====
2006 Victorian state election: Prahran
| Party | Candidate | Votes | % | ±% |
|---|---|---|---|---|
| Liberal | Clem Newton-Brown | 13,136 | 41.9 | +0.9 |
| Labor | Tony Lupton | 11,518 | 36.7 | −1.3 |
| Greens | Justin Walker | 6,315 | 20.1 | +2.1 |
| Family First | Gary Pinto | 402 | 1.3 | +1.3 |
| Total formal votes | | 31,371 | 96.3 | −0.8 |
| Informal votes | | 1,201 | 3.7 | +0.8 |
| Turnout | | 32,572 | 85.0 | |
Two-party-preferred result
| Labor | Tony Lupton | 16,800 | 53.6 | −0.8 |
| Liberal | Clem Newton-Brown | 14,571 | 46.4 | +0.8 |
| Labor hold | | Swing | −0.8 | |

==== 2002 ====
2002 Victorian state election: Prahran
| Party | Candidate | Votes | % | ±% |
|---|---|---|---|---|
| Liberal | Leonie Burke | 12,713 | 41.0 | −10.7 |
| Labor | Tony Lupton | 11,772 | 38.0 | −1.4 |
| Greens | Dinesh Mathew | 5,591 | 18.0 | +11.4 |
| Democrats | John Gourlay | 504 | 1.6 | +1.6 |
| Independent | Abraham Lincoln | 419 | 1.4 | +1.4 |
| Total formal votes | | 30,999 | 97.1 | −0.2 |
| Informal votes | | 921 | 2.9 | +0.2 |
| Turnout | | 31,920 | 86.6 | |
Two-party-preferred result
| Labor | Tony Lupton | 16,869 | 54.4 | +9.1 |
| Liberal | Leonie Burke | 14,130 | 45.6 | −9.1 |
| Labor gain from Liberal | | Swing | +9.1 | |

=== Elections in the 1990s ===
==== 1999 ====
1999 Victorian state election: Prahran
| Party | Candidate | Votes | % | ±% |
|---|---|---|---|---|
| Liberal | Leonie Burke | 16,789 | 51.0 | −1.8 |
| Labor | Joseph O'Reilly | 13,056 | 39.7 | −3.9 |
| Greens | Wendy Salter | 2,282 | 6.9 | +6.9 |
| Democratic Labor | Frances Murphy | 609 | 1.9 | +1.9 |
| Natural Law | Margaret Dawson | 164 | 0.5 | −3.1 |
| Total formal votes | | 32,900 | 97.3 | −0.4 |
| Informal votes | | 904 | 2.7 | +0.4 |
| Turnout | | 33,804 | 86.5 | |
Two-party-preferred result
| Liberal | Leonie Burke | 17,785 | 54.0 | −0.6 |
| Labor | Joseph O'Reilly | 15,126 | 46.0 | +0.6 |
| Liberal hold | | Swing | −0.6 | |

==== 1996 ====
1996 Victorian state election: Prahran
| Party | Candidate | Votes | % | ±% |
|---|---|---|---|---|
| Liberal | Leonie Burke | 17,135 | 52.8 | −1.9 |
| Labor | Nicky Kepert | 14,133 | 43.6 | +8.1 |
| Natural Law | Jan Allison | 1,157 | 3.6 | +0.0 |
| Total formal votes | | 32,425 | 97.7 | +1.8 |
| Informal votes | | 770 | 2.3 | −1.8 |
| Turnout | | 33,195 | 87.6 | |
Two-party-preferred result
| Liberal | Leonie Burke | 17,673 | 54.6 | −3.2 |
| Labor | Nicky Kepert | 14,697 | 45.4 | +3.2 |
| Liberal hold | | Swing | −3.2 | |

==== 1992 ====
1992 Victorian state election: Prahran
| Party | Candidate | Votes | % | ±% |
|---|---|---|---|---|
| Liberal | Don Hayward | 16,502 | 54.8 | +6.4 |
| Labor | Cynthia Levey | 10,682 | 35.4 | −11.3 |
| Greens | Francesca Davidson | 1,863 | 6.2 | +6.2 |
| Natural Law | Greg Broszczyk | 1,086 | 3.6 | +3.6 |
| Total formal votes | | 30,133 | 95.9 | +0.6 |
| Informal votes | | 1,291 | 4.1 | −0.6 |
| Turnout | | 31,424 | 89.5 | |
Two-party-preferred result
| Liberal | Don Hayward | 17,387 | 57.8 | +7.5 |
| Labor | Cynthia Levey | 12,678 | 42.2 | −7.5 |
| Liberal hold | | Swing | +7.5 | |

=== Elections in the 1980s ===
==== 1988 ====
1988 Victorian state election: Prahran
| Party | Candidate | Votes | % | ±% |
|---|---|---|---|---|
| Liberal | Don Hayward | 13,531 | 56.05 | +2.62 |
| Labor | Roman Jade | 10,020 | 41.50 | +0.28 |
| Call to Australia | Neil Baluch | 592 | 2.45 | +2.45 |
| Total formal votes | | 24,143 | 95.91 | −1.28 |
| Informal votes | | 1,029 | 4.09 | +1.28 |
| Turnout | | 25,172 | 86.46 | −1.80 |
Two-party-preferred result
| Liberal | Don Hayward | 13,864 | 57.42 | +0.48 |
| Labor | Roman Jade | 10,279 | 42.58 | −0.48 |
| Liberal hold | | Swing | +0.48 | |

==== 1985 ====
1985 Victorian state election: Prahran
| Party | Candidate | Votes | % | ±% |
|---|---|---|---|---|
| Liberal | Don Hayward | 14,582 | 53.4 | +3.9 |
| Labor | Hendrik van Leeuwen | 11,250 | 41.2 | −3.4 |
| Independent | Norman Long | 746 | 2.7 | +2.7 |
| Public Transport | Alan Parker | 714 | 2.6 | +2.6 |
| Total formal votes | | 27,292 | 97.2 | |
| Informal votes | | 788 | 2.8 | |
| Turnout | | 28,080 | 88.3 | |
Two-party-preferred result
| Liberal | Don Hayward | 15,502 | 56.8 | +5.1 |
| Labor | Hendrik van Leeuwen | 11,790 | 43.2 | −5.1 |
| Liberal hold | | Swing | +5.1 | |

==== 1982 ====
1982 Victorian state election: Prahran
| Party | Candidate | Votes | % | ±% |
|---|---|---|---|---|
| Labor | Bob Miller | 11,241 | 50.6 | +4.5 |
| Liberal | Peter Thomson | 9,746 | 43.9 | +0.3 |
| Democrats | Pamela Hoobin | 1,038 | 4.7 | −4.3 |
| Socialist | Trevor McCandless | 195 | 0.9 | +0.9 |
| Total formal votes | | 22,220 | 97.6 | +0.9 |
| Informal votes | | 546 | 2.4 | −0.9 |
| Turnout | | 22,766 | 89.1 | +0.9 |
Two-party-preferred result
| Labor | Bob Miller | 11,935 | 53.7 | +2.8 |
| Liberal | Peter Thomson | 10,285 | 46.3 | −2.8 |
| Labor hold | | Swing | +2.8 | |

=== Elections in the 1970s ===
==== 1979 ====
1979 Victorian state election: Prahran
| Party | Candidate | Votes | % | ±% |
|---|---|---|---|---|
| Labor | Bob Miller | 10,517 | 46.1 | +5.6 |
| Liberal | Tony De Domenico | 9,960 | 43.6 | −7.9 |
| Democrats | Peter Bowden | 2,059 | 9.0 | +9.0 |
| Independent | Trevor McCandless | 291 | 1.3 | +1.3 |
| Total formal votes | | 22,827 | 96.7 | −0.3 |
| Informal votes | | 780 | 3.3 | +0.3 |
| Turnout | | 23,607 | 88.2 | +3.9 |
Two-party-preferred result
| Labor | Bob Miller | 11,630 | 50.9 | +6.6 |
| Liberal | Tony De Domenico | 11,197 | 49.1 | −6.6 |
| Labor gain from Liberal | | Swing | +6.6 | |

==== 1976 ====
1976 Victorian state election: Prahran
| Party | Candidate | Votes | % | ±% |
|---|---|---|---|---|
| Liberal | Sam Loxton | 12,414 | 51.5 | +0.3 |
| Labor | Morris Milder | 9,760 | 40.5 | −2.2 |
| Independent | Michael Salvaris | 1,086 | 4.5 | +4.5 |
| Workers | Paul Krutulis | 858 | 3.6 | +3.6 |
| Total formal votes | | 24,118 | 97.0 | |
| Informal votes | | 753 | 3.0 | |
| Turnout | | 24,871 | 84.3 | |
Two-party-preferred result
| Liberal | Sam Loxton | 13,419 | 55.7 | −0.8 |
| Labor | Morris Milder | 10,699 | 44.3 | +0.8 |
| Liberal hold | | Swing | −0.8 | |

==== 1973 ====
1973 Victorian state election: Prahran
| Party | Candidate | Votes | % | ±% |
|---|---|---|---|---|
| Liberal | Sam Loxton | 11,306 | 48.1 | +6.0 |
| Labor | Murray Pearce | 10,305 | 43.9 | +4.1 |
| Democratic Labor | John Johnston | 1,891 | 8.1 | −0.5 |
| Total formal votes | | 23,502 | 96.7 | +1.5 |
| Informal votes | | 795 | 3.3 | −1.5 |
| Turnout | | 24,297 | 87.7 | −1.0 |
Two-party-preferred result
| Liberal | Sam Loxton | 12,955 | 55.1 | +0.1 |
| Labor | Murray Pearce | 10,547 | 44.9 | −0.1 |
| Liberal hold | | Swing | +0.1 | |

==== 1970 ====
1970 Victorian state election: Prahran
| Party | Candidate | Votes | % | ±% |
|---|---|---|---|---|
| Liberal | Sam Loxton | 9,188 | 42.1 | −2.3 |
| Labor | Ivan Trayling | 8,681 | 39.8 | +4.2 |
| Democratic Labor | John Johnston | 1,877 | 8.6 | 0.0 |
| Independent | James Banks | 1,460 | 6.7 | +6.7 |
| Defence of Government Schools | David Tuck | 601 | 2.8 | +2.8 |
| Total formal votes | | 21,807 | 95.2 | +0.2 |
| Informal votes | | 1,092 | 4.8 | −0.2 |
| Turnout | | 22,899 | 88.7 | −0.9 |
Two-party-preferred result
| Liberal | Sam Loxton | 11,983 | 55.0 | +1.2 |
| Labor | Ivan Trayling | 9,824 | 45.0 | −1.2 |
| Liberal hold | | Swing | +1.2 | |

=== Elections in the 1960s ===
==== 1967 ====
1967 Victorian state election: Prahran
| Party | Candidate | Votes | % | ±% |
|---|---|---|---|---|
| Liberal | Sam Loxton | 9,845 | 44.4 | +0.1 |
| Labor | John Dyer | 7,902 | 35.6 | −9.2 |
| Independent | George Gahan | 2,378 | 10.7 | +10.7 |
| Democratic Labor | Gavan Grimes | 1,906 | 8.6 | −2.3 |
| Independent | John Ketelhorn | 148 | 0.7 | +0.7 |
| Total formal votes | | 22,179 | 95.0 | |
| Informal votes | | 1,159 | 5.0 | |
| Turnout | | 23,338 | 89.6 | |
Two-party-preferred result
| Liberal | Sam Loxton | 11,934 | 53.8 | +0.2 |
| Labor | John Dyer | 10,245 | 46.2 | −0.2 |
| Liberal hold | | Swing | +0.2 | |

==== 1964 ====
1964 Victorian state election: Prahran
| Party | Candidate | Votes | % | ±% |
|---|---|---|---|---|
| Liberal and Country | Sam Loxton | 7,464 | 45.8 | +4.1 |
| Labor | Robert Pettiona | 6,709 | 41.1 | −4.2 |
| Democratic Labor | Gordon Haberman | 1,794 | 10.5 | −2.5 |
| Independent | John Amurry | 430 | 2.6 | +2.6 |
| Total formal votes | | 16,307 | 96.6 | −0.5 |
| Informal votes | | 567 | 3.4 | +0.5 |
| Turnout | | 16,874 | 92.3 | 0.0 |
Two-party-preferred result
| Liberal and Country | Sam Loxton | 14,289 | 64.8 | +2.5 |
| Labor | Robert Pettiona | 7,750 | 35.2 | −2.5 |
| Liberal and Country hold | | Swing | +2.5 | |

==== 1961 ====
1961 Victorian state election: Prahran
| Party | Candidate | Votes | % | ±% |
|---|---|---|---|---|
| Labor | George Gahan | 7,430 | 45.3 | +2.0 |
| Liberal and Country | Sam Loxton | 6,839 | 41.7 | −2.0 |
| Democratic Labor | Gordon Haberman | 2,137 | 13.0 | 0.0 |
| Total formal votes | | 16,406 | 97.1 | −0.8 |
| Informal votes | | 486 | 2.9 | +0.8 |
| Turnout | | 16,892 | 92.3 | +0.1 |
Two-party-preferred result
| Liberal and Country | Sam Loxton | 8,648 | 52.7 | −2.2 |
| Labor | George Gahan | 7,758 | 47.3 | +2.2 |
| Liberal and Country hold | | Swing | −2.2 | |

=== Elections in the 1950s ===
==== 1958 ====
1958 Victorian state election: Prahran
| Party | Candidate | Votes | % | ±% |
|---|---|---|---|---|
| Liberal and Country | Sam Loxton | 7,798 | 43.7 | |
| Labor | Robert Pettiona | 7,734 | 43.3 | |
| Democratic Labor | Gordon Haberman | 2,325 | 13.0 | |
| Total formal votes | | 17,857 | 97.9 | |
| Informal votes | | 375 | 2.1 | |
| Turnout | | 18,232 | 92.2 | |
Two-party-preferred result
| Liberal and Country | Sam Loxton | 9,794 | 54.9 | |
| Labor | Robert Pettiona | 8,063 | 45.1 | |
| Liberal and Country hold | | Swing | | |

==== 1955 ====
1955 Victorian state election: Prahran
| Party | Candidate | Votes | % | ±% |
|---|---|---|---|---|
| Labor | Robert Pettiona | 7,738 | 47.3 | |
| Liberal and Country | Sam Loxton | 5,847 | 35.7 | |
| Labor (A-C) | James Johnson | 2,238 | 13.7 | |
| Independent | Leonard Bennett | 553 | 3.4 | |
| Total formal votes | | 16,376 | 96.6 | |
| Informal votes | | 576 | 3.4 | |
| Turnout | | 16,952 | 92.6 | |
Two-party-preferred result
| Liberal and Country | Sam Loxton | 8,195 | 50.04 | |
| Labor | Robert Pettiona | 8,181 | 49.96 | |
| Liberal and Country gain from Labor | | Swing | | |

==== 1952 ====
1952 Victorian state election: Prahran
| Party | Candidate | Votes | % | ±% |
|---|---|---|---|---|
| Labor | Robert Pettiona | 13,009 | 61.6 | +6.0 |
| Liberal and Country | Charles Gawith | 8,114 | 38.4 | −6.0 |
| Total formal votes | | 21,123 | 98.2 | −0.8 |
| Informal votes | | 380 | 1.8 | +0.8 |
| Turnout | | 21,503 | 92.2 | −2.0 |
| Labor hold | | Swing | +6.0 | |

==== 1951 by-election ====
1951 Prahran state by-election
| Party | Candidate | Votes | % | ±% |
|---|---|---|---|---|
| Labor | Robert Pettiona | 10,922 | 52.7 | −2.9 |
| Liberal and Country | Desmond McGinnes | 9,803 | 47.3 | +2.9 |
| Total formal votes | | 20,725 | 99.0 | 0.0 |
| Informal votes | | 207 | 1.0 | 0.0 |
| Turnout | | 20,932 | 84.7 | −9.5 |
| Labor hold | | Swing | −2.9 | |

==== 1950 ====
1950 Victorian state election: Prahran
| Party | Candidate | Votes | % | ±% |
|---|---|---|---|---|
| Labor | Frank Crean | 12,879 | 55.6 | +5.4 |
| Liberal and Country | Charles Barrington | 10,267 | 44.4 | −5.4 |
| Total formal votes | | 23,146 | 99.0 | +0.1 |
| Informal votes | | 223 | 1.0 | −0.1 |
| Turnout | | 23,369 | 94.2 | +3.4 |
| Labor hold | | Swing | +5.4 | |

=== Elections in the 1940s ===
==== 1949 by-election ====
1949 Prahran state by-election
| Party | Candidate | Votes | % | ±% |
|---|---|---|---|---|
| Labor | Frank Crean | 11,379 | 51.2 | +1.0 |
| Liberal | Martin Smith | 10,829 | 48.8 | −1.0 |
| Total formal votes | | 22,208 | 99.1 | +0.2 |
| Informal votes | | 195 | 0.9 | −0.2 |
| Turnout | | 22,403 | 86.9 | −3.9 |
| Labor hold | | Swing | +1.0 | |

==== 1947 ====
1947 Victorian state election: Prahran
| Party | Candidate | Votes | % | ±% |
|---|---|---|---|---|
| Labor | Bill Quirk | 12,329 | 50.2 | −3.2 |
| Liberal | Martin Smith | 12,238 | 49.8 | +9.7 |
| Total formal votes | | 24,567 | 98.9 | +1.1 |
| Informal votes | | 280 | 1.1 | −1.1 |
| Turnout | | 24,847 | 90.8 | +5.2 |
| Labor hold | | Swing | N/A | |

==== 1945 ====
1945 Victorian state election: Prahran
| Party | Candidate | Votes | % | ±% |
|---|---|---|---|---|
| Labor | Bill Quirk | 11,949 | 53.4 | |
| Liberal | Peter Isaacson | 8,977 | 40.1 | |
| Independent Labor | Arthur Jackson | 1,459 | 6.5 | |
| Total formal votes | | 22,385 | 97.8 | |
| Informal votes | | 495 | 2.2 | |
| Turnout | | 22,880 | 85.6 | |
| Labor gain from Liberal | | Swing | | |

- Preferences were not distributed.

==== 1945 by-election ====
1945 Prahran state by-election
| Party | Candidate | Votes | % | ±% |
|---|---|---|---|---|
| Labor | Bill Quirk | 11,143 | 47.3 | +9.2 |
| Liberal | Frank Collins | 9,078 | 38.5 | −10.6 (Note: In March 1945, all parliamentary members of the Victorian branch of the United Australia Party (UAP) joined the newly-formed Liberal Party, and swings are compared with the UAP at the 1943 state election.) |
| Communist | Leslie Sampson | 1,896 | 8.0 | −4.6 |
| Independent | William Harris | 1,457 | 6.2 | +6.2 |
| Total formal votes | | 23,574 | 97.4 | +0.6 |
| Informal votes | | 639 | 2.6 | −0.6 |
| Turnout | | 24,213 | 74.6 | −8.7 |
| Labor | Bill Quirk | 11,803 | 50.1 | |
| Liberal | Frank Collins | 9,731 | 41.3 | |
| Communist | Leslie Sampson | 2,040 | 8.7 | |
| Labor gain from Liberal | | Swing | N/A | |

==== 1943 ====
1943 Victorian state election: Prahran
| Party | Candidate | Votes | % | ±% |
|---|---|---|---|---|
| United Australia | John Ellis | 13,031 | 49.1 | −6.7 |
| Labor | John Ryder | 10,123 | 38.1 | −6.1 |
| Communist | Malcolm Good | 3,406 | 12.8 | +12.8 |
| Total formal votes | | 26,560 | 96.8 | −1.4 |
| Informal votes | | 880 | 3.2 | +1.4 |
| Turnout | | 37,440 | 83.3 | −7.3 |
Two-party-preferred result
| United Australia | John Ellis | 13,994 | 52.7 | −3.1 |
| Labor | John Ryder | 12,566 | 47.4 | +3.1 |
| United Australia hold | | Swing | −3.1 | |

==== 1940 ====
1940 Victorian state election: Prahran
| Party | Candidate | Votes | % | ±% |
|---|---|---|---|---|
| United Australia | John Ellis | 12,878 | 55.8 | +0.3 |
| Labor | Roy Cameron | 10,193 | 44.2 | −0.3 |
| Total formal votes | | 23,071 | 98.2 | −0.7 |
| Informal votes | | 416 | 1.8 | +0.7 |
| Turnout | | 23,487 | 90.6 | −3.6 |
| United Australia hold | | Swing | +0.3 | |

=== Elections in the 1930s ===
==== 1937 ====
1937 Victorian state election: Prahran
| Party | Candidate | Votes | % | ±% |
|---|---|---|---|---|
| United Australia | John Ellis | 13,243 | 55.5 | −1.9 |
| Labor | Archibald Fraser | 10,599 | 44.5 | +1.9 |
| Total formal votes | | 23,842 | 98.9 | +0.3 |
| Informal votes | | 259 | 1.1 | −0.3 |
| Turnout | | 24,101 | 94.2 | +0.6 |
| United Australia hold | | Swing | −1.9 | |

==== 1935 ====
1935 Victorian state election: Prahran
| Party | Candidate | Votes | % | ±% |
|---|---|---|---|---|
| United Australia | John Ellis | 13,478 | 57.4 | −2.1 |
| Labor | Archibald Fraser | 10,016 | 42.6 | +20.4 |
| Total formal votes | | 23,494 | 98.6 | +0.9 |
| Informal votes | | 331 | 1.4 | −0.9 |
| Turnout | | 23,825 | 93.6 | +2.3 |
| United Australia hold | | Swing | −6.7 | |

==== 1932 ====
1932 Victorian state election: Prahran
| Party | Candidate | Votes | % | ±% |
|---|---|---|---|---|
| United Australia | John Ellis | 12,768 | 59.5 | +16.2 |
| Labor | Victor Stout | 4,771 | 22.2 | −34.5 |
| Premiers' Plan Labor | Arthur Jackson | 3,913 | 18.2 | +18.2 |
| Total formal votes | | 21,452 | 97.7 | −1.3 |
| Informal votes | | 502 | 2.3 | +1.3 |
| Turnout | | 21,954 | 91.3 | −4.8 |
Two-party-preferred result
| United Australia | John Ellis | | 64.1 | |
| Labor | Victor Stout | | 35.9 | |
| United Australia gain from Labor | | Swing | N/A | |

=== Elections in the 1920s ===
==== 1929 ====
1929 Victorian state election: Prahran
| Party | Candidate | Votes | % | ±% |
|---|---|---|---|---|
| Labor | Arthur Jackson | 12,516 | 56.7 | +0.2 |
| Nationalist | Alfred Cole | 9,575 | 43.3 | −0.2 |
| Total formal votes | | 22,100 | 98.9 | +0.2 |
| Informal votes | | 254 | 1.1 | −0.2 |
| Turnout | | 22,345 | 92.0 | +0.7 |
| Labor hold | | Swing | +0.2 | |

==== 1927 ====
1927 Victorian state election: Prahran
| Party | Candidate | Votes | % | ±% |
|---|---|---|---|---|
| Labor | Arthur Jackson | 12,772 | 56.5 | +4.9 |
| Nationalist | Thomas White | 9,847 | 43.5 | +11.1 |
| Total formal votes | | 22,619 | 98.7 | |
| Informal votes | | 289 | 1.3 | |
| Turnout | | 22,908 | 91.3 | |
| Labor hold | | Swing | | |

==== 1924 ====
1924 Victorian state election: Prahran
| Party | Candidate | Votes | % | ±% |
|---|---|---|---|---|
| Labor | Arthur Jackson | 6,316 | 51.6 | +2.6 |
| Nationalist | Richard Fetherston | 3,957 | 32.4 | −18.2 |
| Independent Liberal | Alfred Woodfull | 1,850 | 15.1 | +15.1 |
| Independent Labor | Harold Croughnan | 106 | 0.9 | +0.9 |
| Total formal votes | | 12,229 | 97.6 | −1.7 |
| Informal votes | | 307 | 2.4 | +1.7 |
| Turnout | | 12,536 | 64.5 | +9.7 |
Two-party-preferred result
| Labor | Arthur Jackson | | 53.5 | +4.1 |
| Nationalist | Richard Fetherston | | 46.5 | −4.1 |
| Labor gain from Nationalist | | Swing | +4.1 | |

- Two party preferred vote was estimated.

==== 1921 ====
1921 Victorian state election: Prahran
| Party | Candidate | Votes | % | ±% |
|---|---|---|---|---|
| Nationalist | Richard Fetherston | 5,815 | 50.6 | +2.1 |
| Labor | Alexander Parker | 5,668 | 49.4 | −2.1 |
| Total formal votes | | 11,483 | 99.3 | +0.2 |
| Informal votes | | 86 | 0.7 | −0.2 |
| Turnout | | 11,569 | 54.8 | −6.0 |
| Nationalist gain from Labor | | Swing | +2.1 | |

==== 1920 ====
1920 Victorian state election: Prahran
| Party | Candidate | Votes | % | ±% |
|---|---|---|---|---|
| Labor | Alexander Parker | 6,408 | 51.5 | +10.6 |
| Nationalist | Donald Mackinnon | 6,048 | 48.5 | −10.6 |
| Total formal votes | | 12,456 | 99.1 | +2.0 |
| Informal votes | | 118 | 0.9 | −2.0 |
| Turnout | | 12,574 | 60.8 | +15.4 |
| Labor gain from Nationalist | | Swing | +10.6 | |

=== Elections in the 1910s ===
==== 1917 ====
1917 Victorian state election: Prahran
| Party | Candidate | Votes | % | ±% |
|---|---|---|---|---|
| Nationalist | Donald Mackinnon | 5,291 | 59.1 | +6.7 |
| Labor | Harry Smith | 3,659 | 40.9 | −6.7 |
| Total formal votes | | 8,950 | 97.1 | −0.6 |
| Informal votes | | 265 | 2.9 | +0.6 |
| Turnout | | 9,215 | 45.4 | −1.9 |
| Nationalist hold | | Swing | +6.7 | |

==== 1914 ====
1914 Victorian state election: Prahran
| Party | Candidate | Votes | % | ±% |
|---|---|---|---|---|
| Liberal | Donald Mackinnon | 4,913 | 52.4 | −6.3 |
| Labor | Henry Duke | 4,462 | 47.6 | +6.3 |
| Total formal votes | | 9,375 | 97.7 | −1.4 |
| Informal votes | | 228 | 2.3 | +1.4 |
| Turnout | | 9,598 | 47.3 | −5.4 |
| Liberal hold | | Swing | −6.3 | |

==== 1911 ====
1911 Victorian state election: Prahran
| Party | Candidate | Votes | % | ±% |
|---|---|---|---|---|
| Liberal | Donald Mackinnon | 5,472 | 58.7 | −8.8 |
| Labor | Frank Henty | 3,853 | 41.3 | +8.8 |
| Total formal votes | | 9,325 | 99.1 | −0.7 |
| Informal votes | | 88 | 0.9 | +0.7 |
| Turnout | | 9,413 | 52.7 | −0.2 |
| Liberal hold | | Swing | −8.8 | |
