= Members of the Victorian Legislative Assembly, 1943–1945 =

- ←1940–1943 1945–1947→

This is a list of members of the Victorian Legislative Assembly from 1943 to 1945, as elected at the 1943 state election.

On 25 September 1945, a cross-party group of five United Australia members, two Country members and one Independent voted with Labor and two left-wing Independents to defeat the Dunstan Ministry. The end result, on 2 October 1945, was the swearing in of the Macfarlan Ministry and the calling of the 1945 election.

Name	Party	Electorate	Term in office
Albert Allnutt	Country/Min.	Mildura	1927–1945
Hon Henry Bailey	Country	Warrnambool	1914–1932, 1935–1950
Bill Barry	Labor	Carlton	1932–1955
Matthew Bennett	Country	Gippsland West	1929–1950
Richard Brose^{[4]}	Country	Rodney	1944–1964
Fanny Brownbill	Labor	Geelong	1938–1948
John Cain	Labor	Northcote	1917–1957
Finlay Cameron	Country	Kara Kara and Borung	1935–1945
Arthur Cook ^{[6]}	Labor	Bendigo	1924–1945
Frederick Cook	McEwen Country	Benalla	1936–1961
Tom Corrigan	Labor	Port Melbourne	1942–1952
Ted Cotter	Labor	Richmond	1908–1945
Ernest Coyle^{[2]}	Country	Waranga	1927–1943
Bert Cremean^{[7]}	Labor	Clifton Hill	1929–1945
Jack Cremean^{[7]}	Labor	Clifton Hill	1945–1949
William Cumming	United Australia/Min.	Hampden	1935–1945
Patrick Denigan	Labor	Allandale	1936–1945
Lot Diffey	Country	Wangaratta and Ovens	1929–1945
Keith Dodgshun	Country	Ouyen	1938–1955
Hon Albert Dunstan	Country	Korong and Eaglehawk	1920–1950
William Dunstone^{[4]}	Country	Rodney	1936–1944
John Ellis^{[8]}	United Australia/Liberal	Prahran	1932–1945
William Everard	United Australia/Min.	Evelyn	1917–1950
Frank Field	Labor	Dandenong	1937–1947
Bill Fulton	Country	Gippsland North	1942–1945; 1947–1952
Bill Galvin ^{[6]}	Labor	Bendigo	1945–1964
Bob Gray^{[1]}	Labor	Nunawading	1943–1947; 1952–1955
Edward Guye	Country	Polwarth	1940–1958
William Haworth	United Australia/Min.	Albert Park	1937–1945
Tom Hayes	Labor	Melbourne	1924–1955
Harry Hedditch	Country	Port Fairy and Glenelg	1943–1945; 1947–1950
Wollaston Heily^{[2]}	Country	Waranga	1943–1945
Bill Hodson	Labor	Castlemaine and Kyneton	1940–1945
Frederick Holden	Independent/Country	Grant	1932–1950
Jack Holland	Labor	Flemington	1925–1955
Leslie Hollins	Social Credit/Min.	Hawthorn	1940–1945
Thomas Hollway	United Australia/Liberal	Ballarat	1932–1955
Andrew Hughes	Independent Socialist	Caulfield	1943–1945
Col. Wilfrid Kent Hughes	United Australia/Liberal	Kew	1927–1949
Raymond Hyatt	Labor	Warrenheip and Grenville	1943–1947
Hon Herbert Hyland	Country	Gippsland South	1929–1970
Reginald James ^{[5]}	Country	Bulla and Dalhousie	1943–1944
James Jewell	Labor	Brunswick	1910–1949
Alfred Kirton	Country	Mornington	1932–1947
Brig. Sir George Knox	United Australia/Liberal	Upper Yarra	1927–1960
Hamilton Lamb^{[3]}	Country	Lowan	1935–1943
Hon John Lemmon	Labor	Williamstown	1904–1955
Hon Albert Lind	Country	Gippsland East	1920–1961
Alec McDonald	Country	Stawell and Ararat	1935–1945
John McDonald	Country	Goulburn Valley	1936–1955
Ian Macfarlan	United Australia/Min.	Brighton	1928–1945
William McKenzie	Labor	Wonthaggi	1927–1947
Edwin Mackrell	Country/Min.	Upper Goulburn	1920–1945
Thomas Maltby	United Australia/Min.	Barwon	1929–1961
Hon Norman Martin	Country	Gunbower	1934–1945
Samuel Merrifield	Labor	Essendon	1943–1955
Wilfred Mibus^{[3]}	Country	Lowan	1944–1964
Archie Michaelis	United Australia/Min.	St Kilda	1932–1952
William Moncur	Country	Walhalla	1927–1945
Jack Mullens	Labor	Footscray	1937–1945
Charlie Mutton	Ind. Labor	Coburg	1940–1967
Hon Francis Old	Country	Swan Hill	1919–1945
Trevor Oldham	United Australia/Liberal	Boroondara	1933–1953
Roy Paton	Country	Benambra	1932–1947
Bill Quirk^{[8]}	Labor	Prahran	1945–1948
Squire Reid	Labor	Oakleigh	1927–1932; 1937–1947
Hon Bill Slater	Labor	Dundas	1917–1947
Clive Stoneham	Labor	Maryborough and Daylesford	1942–1970
Harold Thonemann	United Australia/Liberal	Toorak	1941–1945
Hon Tom Tunnecliffe	Labor	Collingwood	1903–1904; 1907–1920; 1921–1947
Ivy Weber^{[1]}	Independent	Nunawading	1937–1943
Leslie Webster ^{[5]}	Country	Bulla and Dalhousie	1944–1947
Henry Zwar ^{[9]}	United Australia/Liberal/ Independent Liberal ^{[9]}	Heidelberg	1932–1945

^{1} Independent Nunawading MLA Ivy Weber resigned in July 1943 to contest the Division of Henty at the 1943 federal election. Labor candidate Bob Gray won the resulting by-election in September 1943.
^{2} Country Party Waranga MLA Ernest Coyle died on 31 August 1943. Country Party candidate Wollaston Heily won the resulting by-election in October 1943.
^{3} Country Party Lowan MLA Hamilton Lamb died on 7 December 1943 at a Japanese prisoner of war camp on the Burma Railway in Thailand. Official notification of his death did not reach Australia until 1 September 1944, nearly nine months later. Country candidate Wilfred Mibus won the resulting by-election on 4 November 1944.
^{4} Country Party Rodney MLA William Dunstone died on 12 April 1944. Country Party candidate Richard Brose won the resulting by-election in June 1944.
^{5} Country Party Bulla and Dalhousie MLA Reginald James died on 27 September 1944. Country Party candidate Leslie Webster won the resulting by-election in November.
^{6} Labor Bendigo MLA Arthur Cook died on 10 April 1945. Labor candidate Bill Galvin won the resulting by-election on 26 May 1945.
^{7} Labor Clifton Hill MLA Bert Cremean died on 24 May 1945. Labor candidate Jack Cremean, his brother, won the resulting by-election on 7 July 1945.
^{8} Liberal Prahran MLA John Ellis died on 2 July 1945. Labor candidate Bill Quirk won the resulting by-election on 18 August 1945.
^{9} Heidelberg MLA Henry Zwar announced on 8 October 1945 that he would not be an endorsed Liberal for the upcoming election and did not belong to the Liberal Party.

== Sources ==
- "Find a Member". State Government of Victoria.
