= 1949 Prahran state by-election =

- 22 January 1949

Electoral district of Prahran in the Victorian Legislative Assembly
- Registered: 25,791
- Turnout: 86.9% (▼3.9)
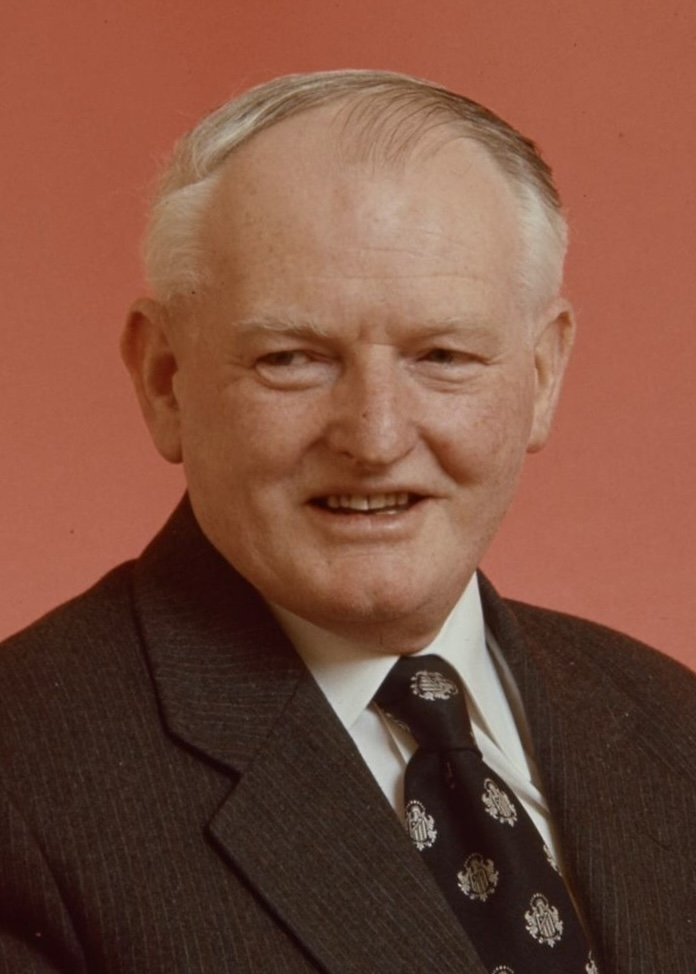

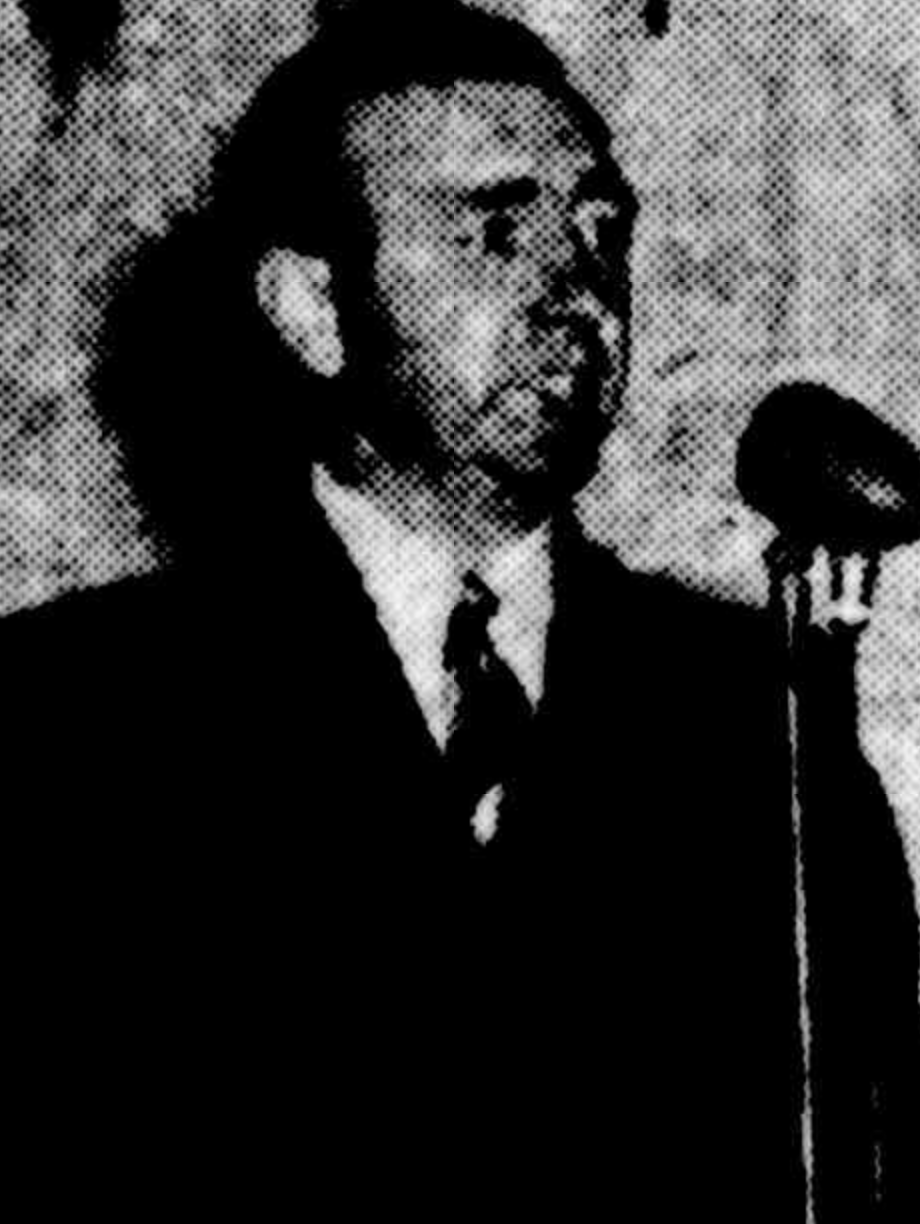
	First party	Second party
Candidate	Frank Crean	Martin Smith
Party	Labor	Liberal
Primary vote	11,379	10,829
Percentage	51.2%	48.8%
Swing	▲1.0	▼1.0
MP before election
Bill Quirk
Labor
Elected MP
Frank Crean
Labor

The 1949 Prahran state by-election was held on 22 January 1949 to elect the member for Prahran in the Victorian Legislative Assembly, following the death of Labor Party MP Bill Quirk.

Frank Crean retained the seat for Labor, gaining a swing of 1% over the Liberal Party, which was serving in government at the time. Crean resigned two years later in 1951 to successfully contest the federal seat of Melbourne Ports, and he later served as Deputy Prime Minister for several months in 1975.

This was the second of three by-elections in Prahran held in a timeframe of six years, with by-elections also held in 1945 (where Quirk was elected) and 1951 (to replace Crean). This was also the final election contested by the original Victorian division of the Liberal Party, as the party ceased to exist in March 1949 when the new Liberal and Country Party (LCP) was formed.

== Key events ==
- 16 November 1948 – Bill Quirk dies
- 25 November 1948 – Liberal preselection closes
- 26 November 1948 – Martin Smith endorsed as Liberal candidate
- 26 November 1948 – Labor preselection closess
- 3 December 1948 – Frank Crean endorsed as Labor candidate
- 15 December 1948 – Writ of election issued by the Speaker of the Legislative Assembly
- 4 January 1949 – Candidate nominations close
- 22 January 1949 – Polling day
- 28 January 1949 – Declaration of result

== Candidates ==
Candidates are listed in the order they appeared on the ballot.

Party	Candidate	Background
Labor	Frank Crean	Member for Albert Park between 1945 and 1947
Liberal	Martin Smith	Former mayor of Prahran and candidate for Prahran in 1947

=== Labor ===
Labor chose Frank Crean, who was elected as the member for Albert Park in 1945 and served until his defeat in 1947, as its candidate. The preselection was also contested by three other candidates – John Bourke (future MP for St Kilda), Thomas Brennan (Labor state executive member and future MLC for Monash) and Robert Pettiona (Federated Rubber and Allied Workers' Union of Australia president and future MP for Prahran) – but all three withdrew in order to allow Crean to win the nomination.

=== Liberal ===
Martin Smith, who served as the mayor of Prahran between 1946 and 1947 and unsuccessfully contested Prahran for the Liberals at the 1947 state election, was again endorsed as the party's candidate. Smith defeated ten other preselection candidates, including Desmond McGinnes, the president of the Liberal Party's Prahran branch.

== Campaign ==
The by-election campaign was largely fought on the issue of price controls, which had been under the control of the state government since September 1948 following a national referendum held in May 1948. Labor leader John Cain claimed that if the Liberals won Prahran, it would immediately begin lifting price controls. The claim was disputed by Liberal leader and premier Thomas Hollway, who described it as "nonsense".

Communism was also a topic throughout the campaign. Hollway promised to fight "socialistic regimentation", with Smith saying he would "destroy communism" if elected. Cain accused the Liberals of having no intention of fighting communism, "because the communists are the greatest assets the Liberals have ever had".

On 3 December 1948, all Country Party ministers resigned from the Hollway ministry and returned to sitting in opposition, ending the coalition between the Liberal Party and the Country Party.

Labor had won Prahran by a margin of only 91 votes in 1947, and the by-election was expected to be close. Predictions were varied, with The Sun News-Pictorial saying a Liberal victory was "expected", while Labor Call (the official newspaper of the Political Labor Council of Victoria) claimed that Crean was indicated to win.

== Results ==
1949 Prahran state by-election
Party	Candidate	Votes	%	±%
Labor	Frank Crean	11,379	51.2	+1.0
Liberal	Martin Smith	10,829	48.8	−1.0
Total formal votes		22,208	99.1	+0.2
Informal votes		195	0.9	−0.2
Turnout		22,403	86.9	−3.9
Labor hold		Swing	+1.0	

== See also ==
- Electoral results for the district of Prahran
- List of Victorian state by-elections
