= 1951 Prahran state by-election =

- 16 June 1951

Electoral district of Prahran in the Victorian Legislative Assembly
- Registered: 24,715
- Turnout: 84.7% (▼9.5)
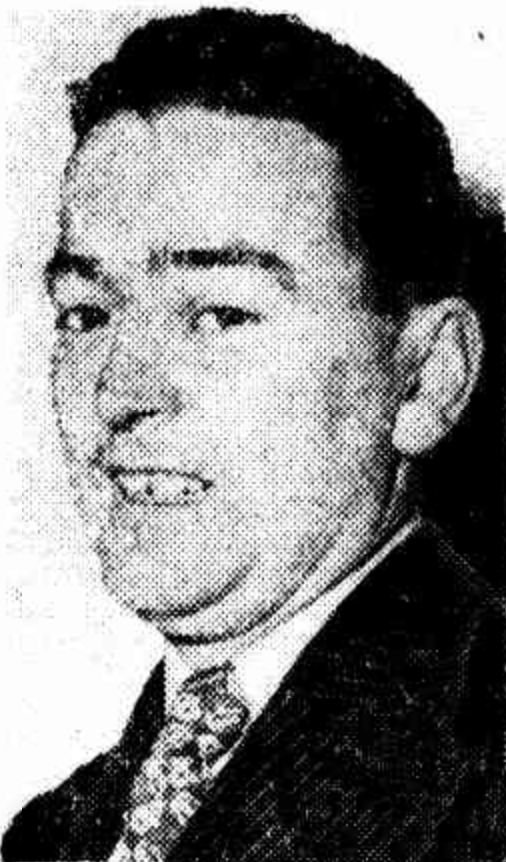

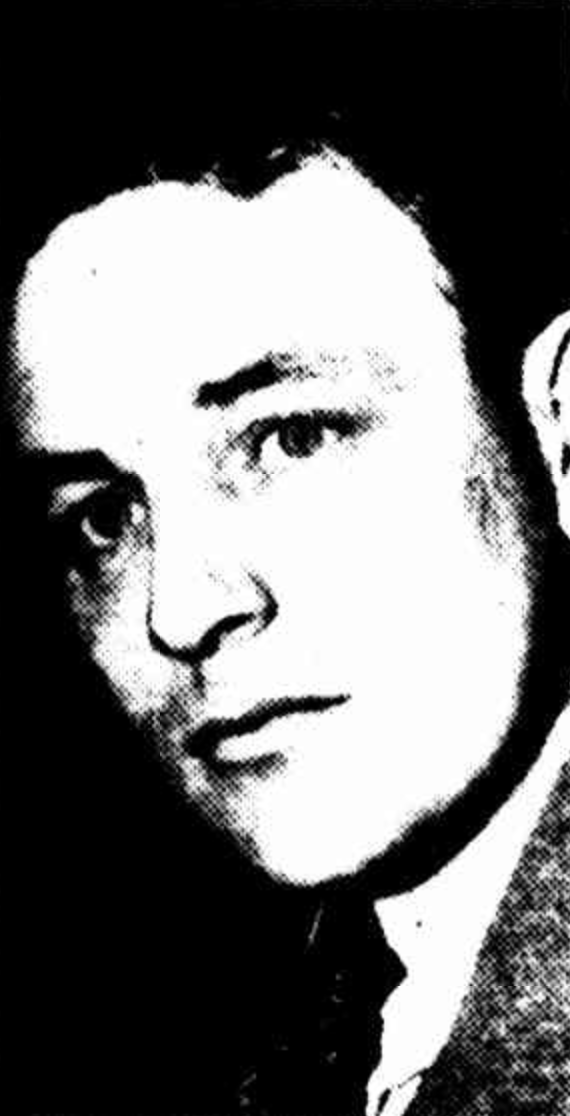
| | First party | Second party |
|---|---|---|
| Candidate | Robert Pettiona | Desmond McGinnes |
| Party | Labor | Liberal and Country |
| Primary vote | 10,922 | 10,829 |
| Percentage | 52.7% | 48.8% |
| Swing | ▼2.9 | ▲2.9 |
MP before election
Frank Crean
Labor
Elected MP
Robert Pettiona
Labor

The 1951 Prahran state by-election was held on 16 June 1951 to elect the member for Prahran in the Victorian Legislative Assembly, following the resignation of Labor Party MP Frank Crean. Crean resigned to contest the federal election on 28 April 1951, where he was elected as the member for Melbourne Ports.

Robert Pettiona retained the seat for Labor despite a swing of 2.9% towards the Liberal and Country Party (LCP). He retained the seat at the 1952 state election but narrowly lost it to the LCP in 1955.

This was the final of three by-elections in Prahran held in a timeframe of six years, with by-elections also held in 1945 and 1949 (where Crean was elected).

== Key events ==
- 17 March 1951 – Frank Crean resigns
- 11 April 1951 – Desmond McGinnes endorsed as LCP candidate
- 12 May 1951 – Robert Pettiona endorsed as Labor candidate
- 28 May 1951 – Candidate nominations close
- 16 June 1951 – Polling day

== Candidates ==
Candidates are listed in the order they appeared on the ballot.

| Party | Candidate | Background |
|---|---|---|
| Liberal and Country | Desmond McGinnes | Candidate for Melbourne at the 1949 federal election |
| Labor | Robert Pettiona | President of the Federated Rubber and Allied Workers' Union of Australia |

=== Labor ===
Robert Pettiona, the president of the Federated Rubber and Allied Workers' Union of Australia and the president of the Labor's Windsor branch, won the party's preselection. He had unsuccessfully ran for Labor preselection at the 1949 Prahran by-election. Pettiona three other candidates – H.E. Clarke (secretary of the Melbourne branch of the Waterside Workers' Federation), N. O'Donnell (public servant and Clerks' Union steward) and L.J. Stewart (Boot Trades Union organiser) – to win preselection.

=== Liberal and Country ===
The LCP chose Desmond McGinnes, a returned soldier, as its candidate. McGinnes had previously sought preselection at the 1949 Prahran by-election while serving as the president of the Prahran branch of the now-defunct Liberal Party. He also contested the 1949 federal election in the seat of Melbourne against Labor's Arthur Calwell.

== Results ==
1951 Prahran state by-election
| Party | Candidate | Votes | % | ±% |
|---|---|---|---|---|
| Labor | Robert Pettiona | 10,922 | 52.7 | −2.9 |
| Liberal and Country | Desmond McGinnes | 9,803 | 47.3 | +2.9 |
| Total formal votes | | 20,725 | 99.0 | 0.0 |
| Informal votes | | 207 | 1.0 | 0.0 |
| Turnout | | 20,932 | 84.7 | −9.5 |
| Labor hold | | Swing | −2.9 | |

== See also ==
- Electoral results for the district of Prahran
- List of Victorian state by-elections
