= 1945 Prahran state by-election =

- 18 August 1945

Electoral district of Prahran in the Victorian Legislative Assembly
- Registered: 32,442
- Turnout: 74.6% (▼8.7)
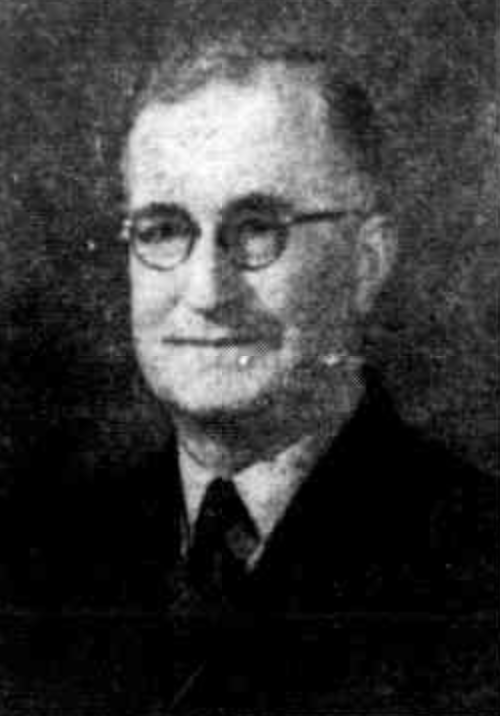

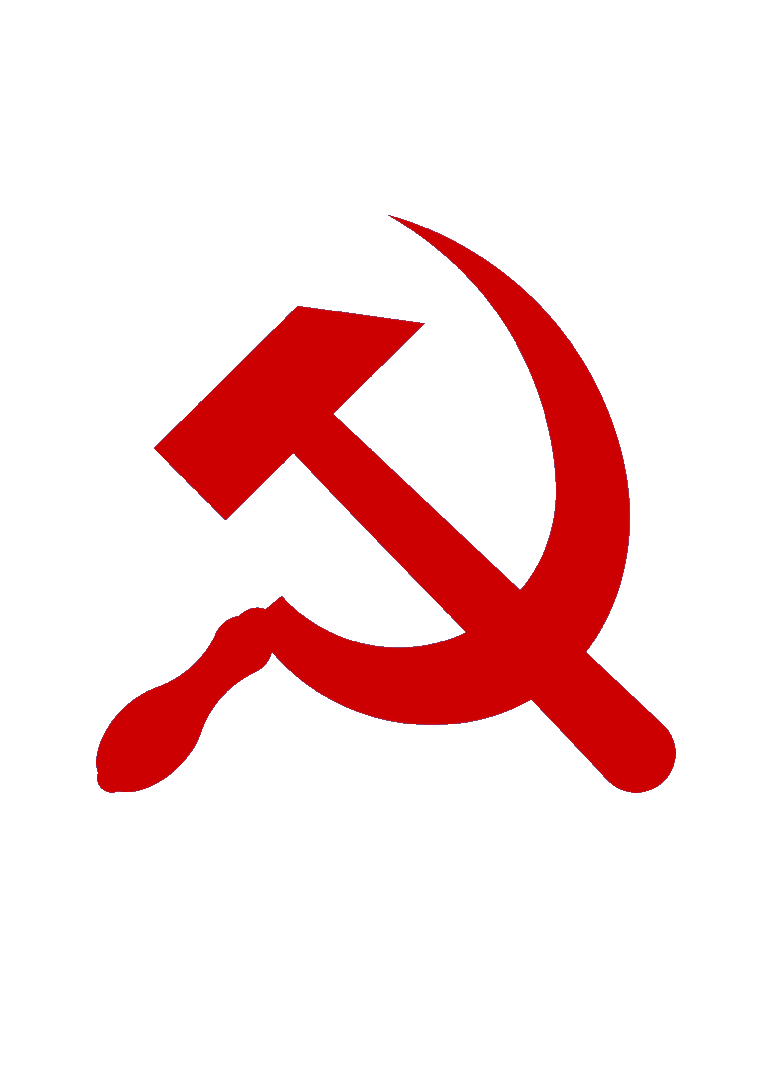
	First party	Second party	Third party
Candidate	Bill Quirk	Frank Collins	Leslie Sampson
Party	Labor	Liberal	Communist
Primary vote	11,143	9,078	1,896
Percentage	47.3%	38.5%	8.0%
Swing	▲9.2	▼10.6 (Note: In March 1945, all parliamentary members of the Victorian branch of the United Australia Party (UAP) joined the newly-formed Liberal Party, and swings are compared with the UAP at the 1943 state election.)	▼4.6
After preferences	50.1%	41.3%	8.7%
MP before election
John Ellis
Liberal
Elected MP
Bill Quirk
Labor

The 1945 Prahran state by-election was held on 18 August 1945 to elect the member for Prahran in the Victorian Legislative Assembly, following the death of Liberal Party MP John Ellis. It was held on the same day as a New South Wales state by-election in Blacktown and a federal by-election in Fremantle.

Labor candidate Bill Quirk gained the seat after a swing of more than 10% away from the Liberals. Quirk retained the seat three months later at the state election in November 1945 and held it again in 1947, serving until his death in 1948.

This was the first of three by-elections in Prahran held in a timeframe of six years, with by-elections also held in 1949 (to replace Quirk) and 1951.

== Key events ==
- 2 July 1945 – John Ellis dies
- 3 August 1945 – Candidate nominations close
- 18 August 1945 – Polling day (8am to 8pm)

== Candidates ==
Candidates are listed in the order they appeared on the ballot.

Party	Candidate	Background
Liberal	Frank Collins	Dairyman
Independent	William Harris	Butcher
Labor	Bill Quirk	Postal technician
Communist	Leslie Sampson	Organiser

== Results ==
1945 Prahran state by-election
Party	Candidate	Votes	%	±%
Labor	Bill Quirk	11,143	47.3	+9.2
Liberal	Frank Collins	9,078	38.5	−10.6
Communist	Leslie Sampson	1,896	8.0	−4.6
Independent	William Harris	1,457	6.2	+6.2
Total formal votes		23,574	97.4	+0.6
Informal votes		639	2.6	−0.6
Turnout		24,213	74.6	−8.7
After distribution of preferences
Labor	Bill Quirk	11,803	50.1	
Liberal	Frank Collins	9,731	41.3	
Communist	Leslie Sampson	2,040	8.7	
Labor gain from Liberal		Swing	N/A	

== See also ==
- Electoral results for the district of Prahran
- List of Victorian state by-elections
