= Tony Lupton =

Australian politician (born 1957)

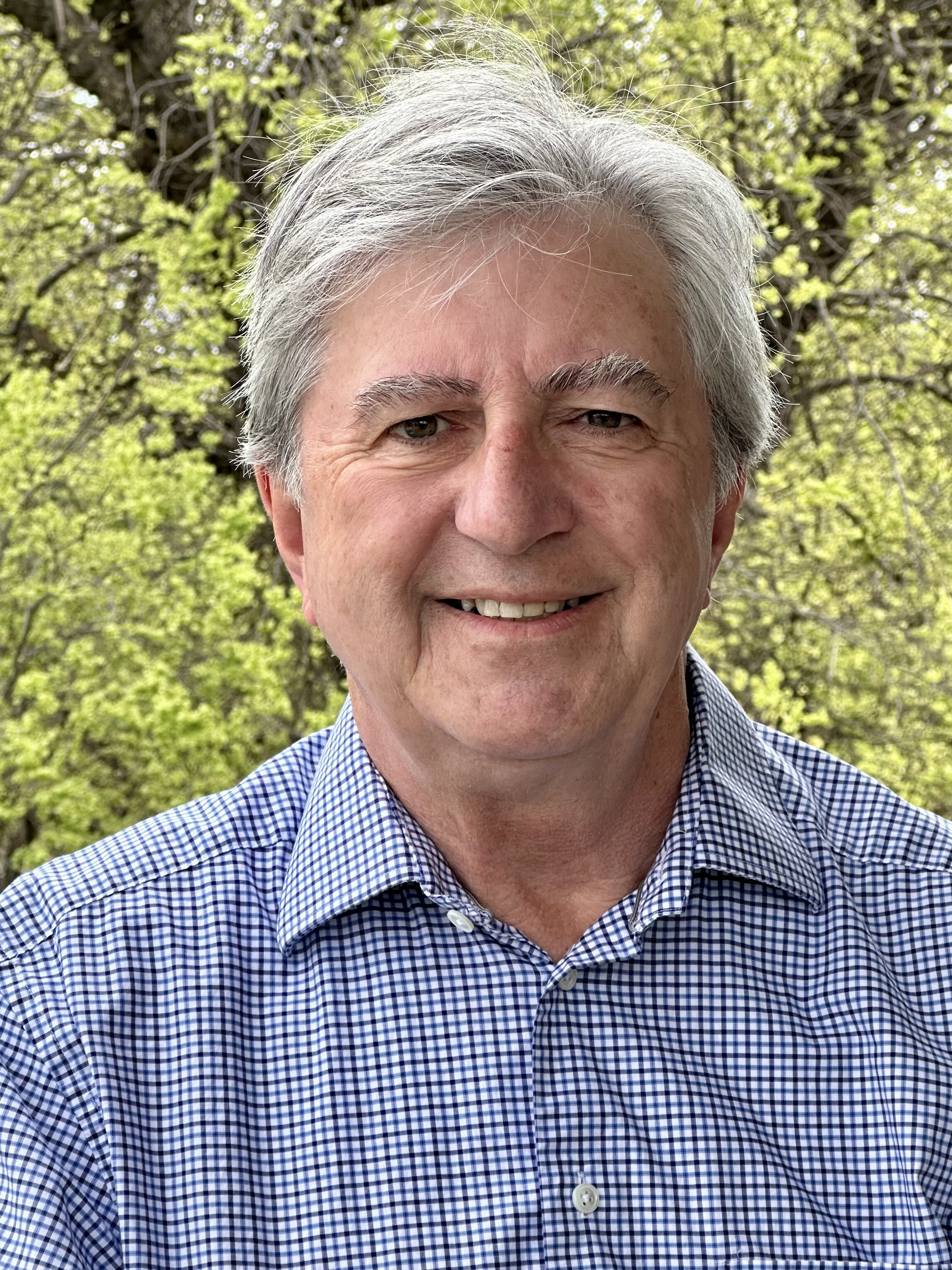
- Lupton in September 2024

Victorian Cabinet Secretary
- In office 3 August 2007 – 2 December 2010
- Premier: John Brumby
- Preceded by: Tony Robinson
- Succeeded by: David Hodgett

Member of the Victorian Legislative Assembly for Prahran
- In office 30 November 2002 – 27 November 2010
- Preceded by: Leonie Burke
- Succeeded by: Clem Newton-Brown

Personal details
- Born: 10 January 1957 (age 69) Melbourne, Victoria, Australia
- Party: Independent (since 2024)
- Other political affiliations: Labor (until 2024)
- Profession: Barrister

Anthony Gerard "Tony" Lupton (born 10 January 1957) is an Australian former politician. He served as the member for Prahran in the Victorian Legislative Assembly from 2002 to 2010, representing the Labor Party.

== Early life ==
Lupton was born in Melbourne and educated at Christian Brothers College in St Kilda. After leaving school, he became an apprentice motor mechanic. In 1978, he returned to school at Caulfield Institute of Technology, successfully completed the Higher School Certificate and gained entrance to an Arts/Law degree course at Monash University.

After graduating he worked as a barrister, specialising in personal injuries cases for injured workers. Lupton joined the Australian Labor Party as a teenager.

== Political career ==
=== Member for Prahran ===
At the 2002 Victorian state election, Lupton was elected as the member for Prahran after defeating sitting Liberal MP Leonie Burke. He was re-elected to a second term in 2006 after defeating Liberal candidate Clem Newton-Brown, and was appointed Parliamentary Secretary for Industry and Innovation following the election. After John Brumby took office as the new premier in 2007, Lupton was appointed Cabinet Secretary.

Lupton lost his seat at the 2010 state election in a rematch with Newton-Brown.

In 2014, Lupton sought Labor preselection but was defeated by Neil Pharaoh.

=== 2025 by-election ===
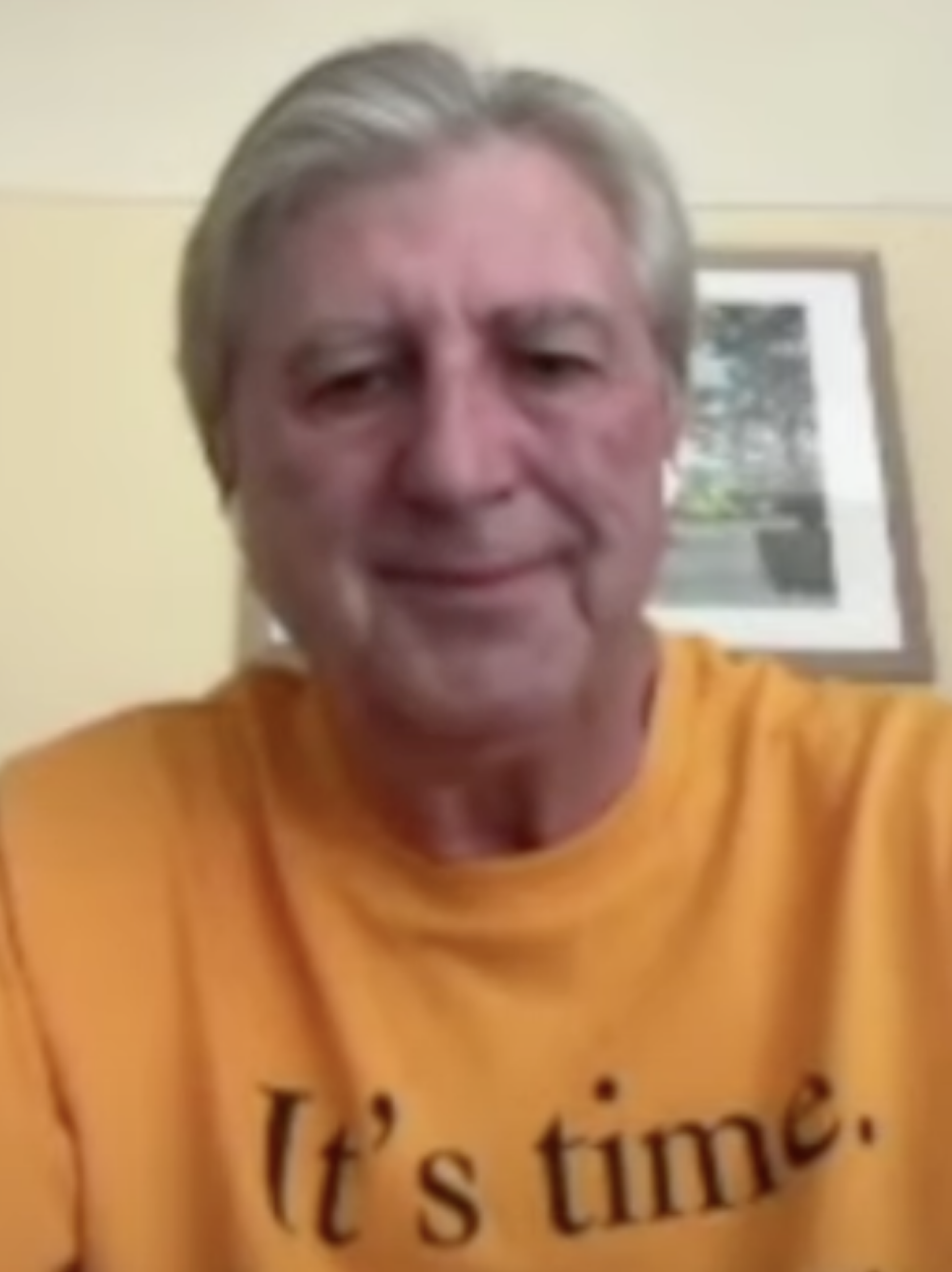
Lupton campaigning with an "It's Time" shirt

In December 2024, Lupton announced he would run as an independent candidate at the 2025 Prahran state by-election, following Labor's decision not to endorse a candidate after the resignation of Greens-turned-independent MP Sam Hibbins. He was endorsed by former Labor premier Steve Bracks.

Lupton attended a campaign meeting with conservative lobby group Advance. On his how-to-vote card, Lupton preferenced Liberal Party candidate Rachel Westaway.

== Political views ==
In an article published in The Australian in October 2024, Lupton said he is a Zionist and is against "identity politics".

== Personal life ==
Lupton is the partner of journalist Julie Szego, and the pair have two daughters. He is a supporter of the Collingwood Football Club in the Australian Football League (AFL).

Victorian Legislative Assembly
Preceded by Leonie Burke	Member for Prahran; 2002–2010	Succeeded by Clem Newton-Brown
