= 1976 Australian Labor Party leadership spill =

1976 Australian Labor Party Leadership spill
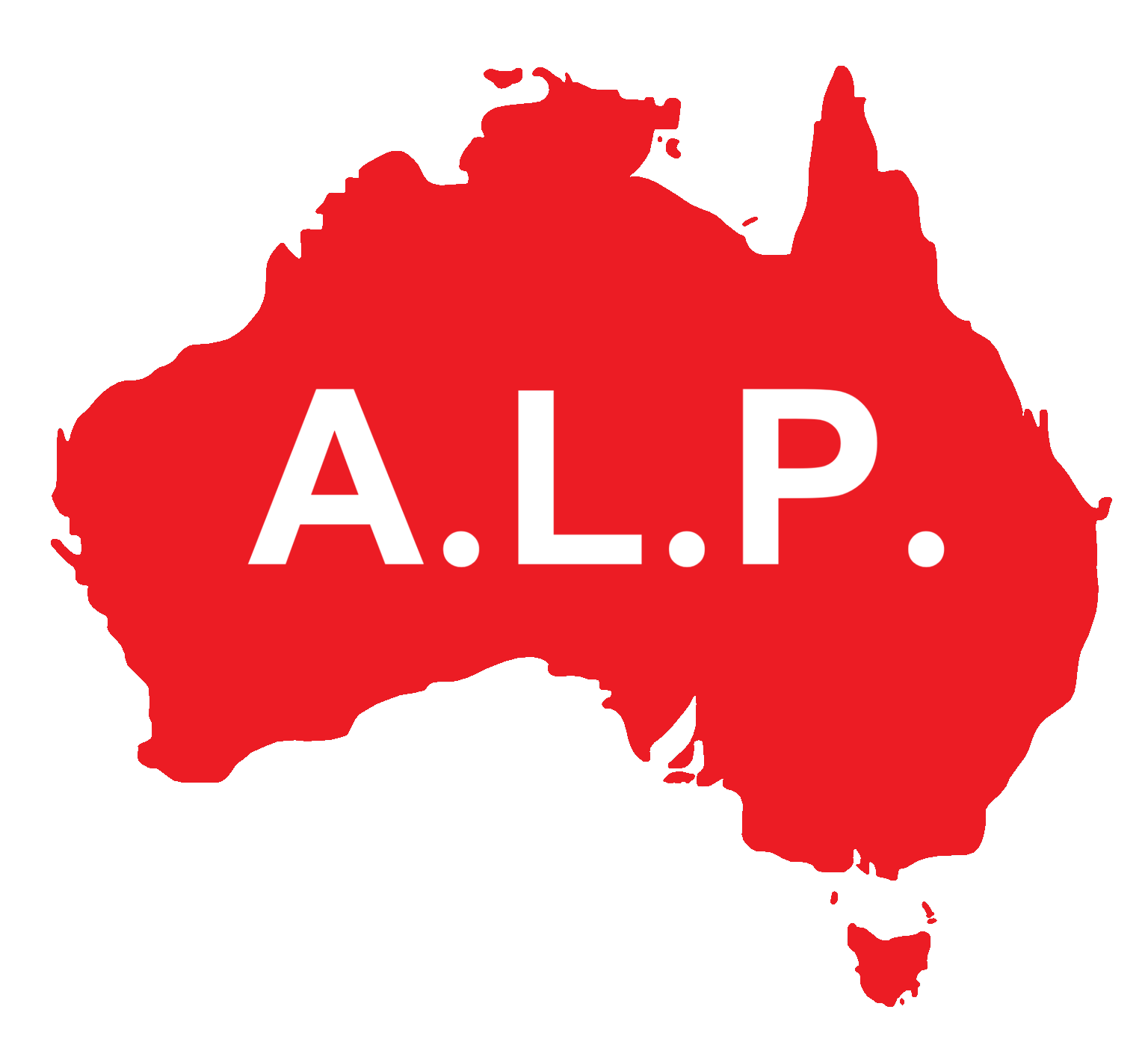
- 27 January 1976
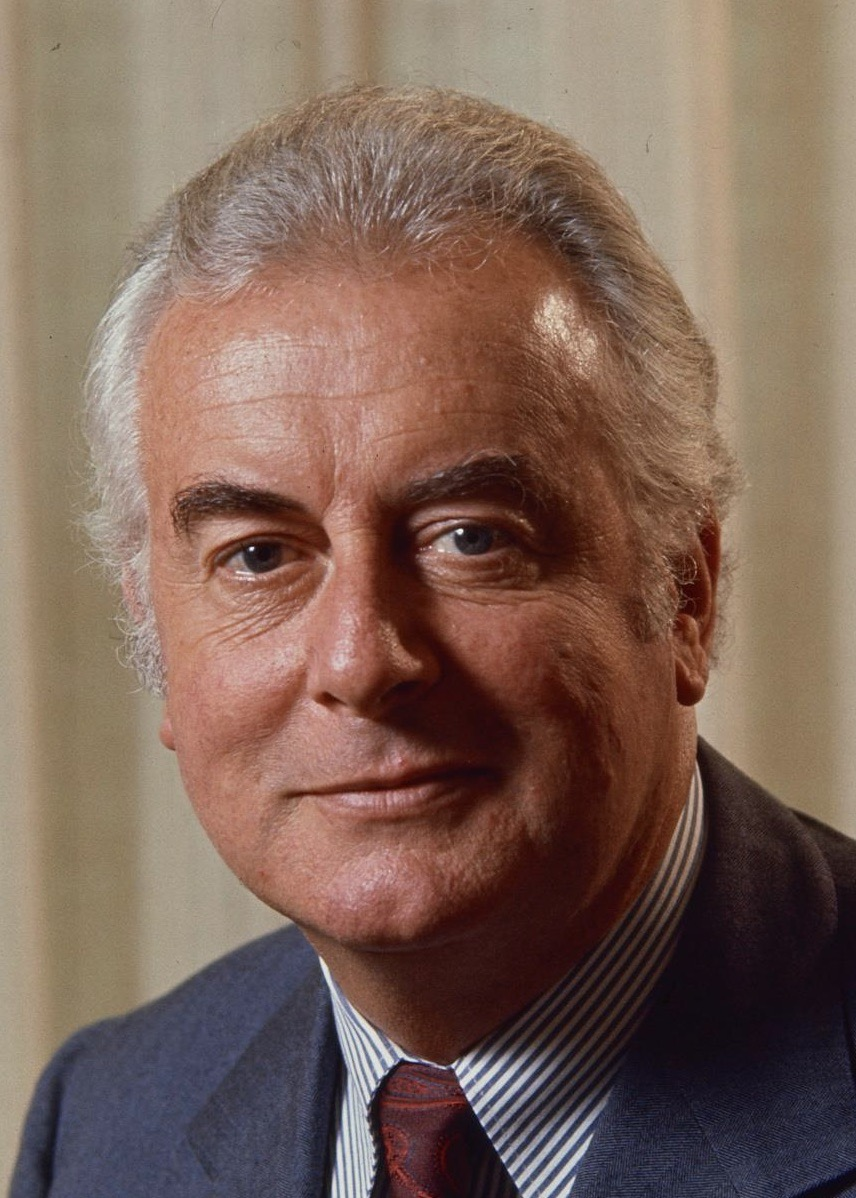

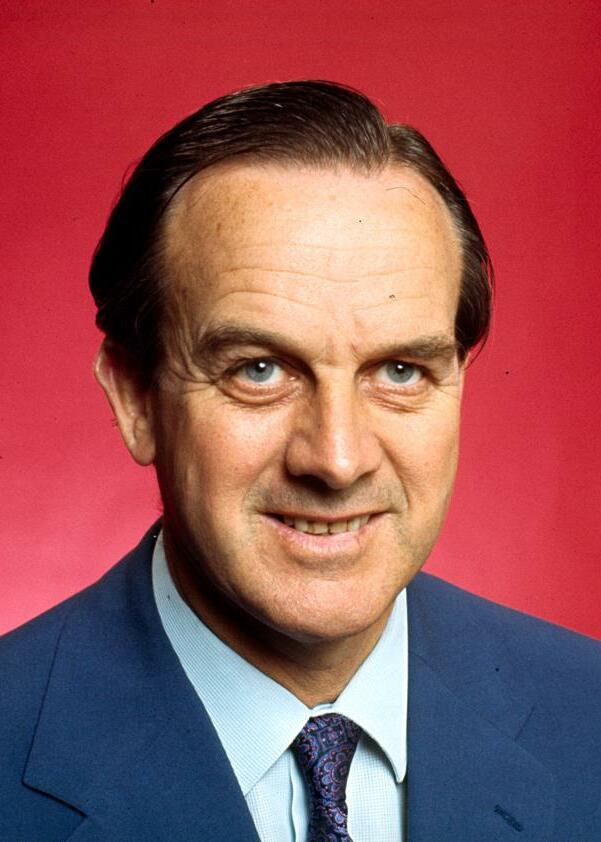

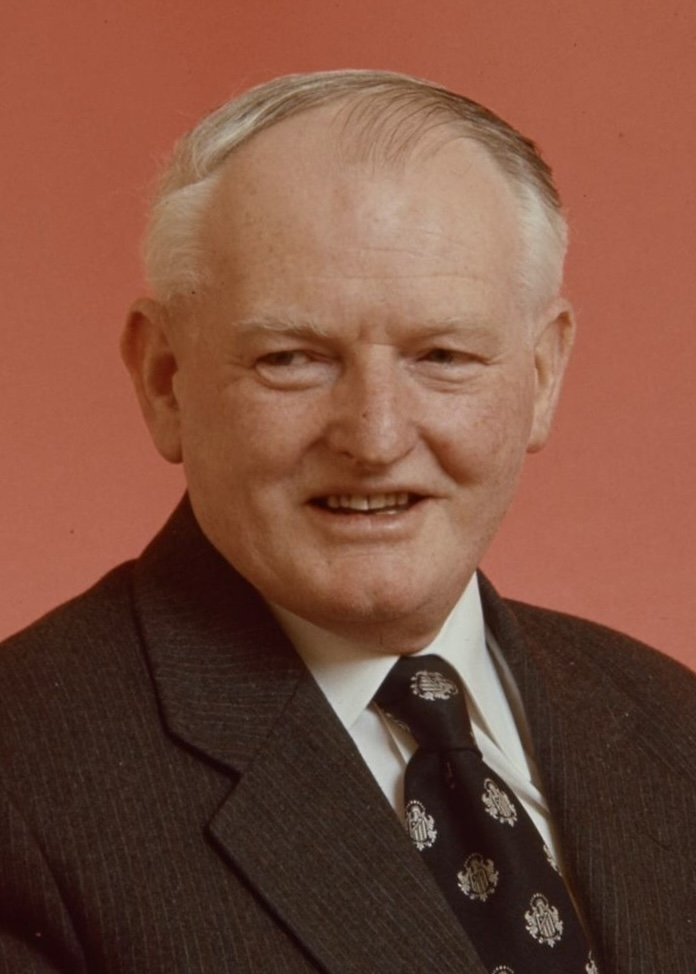
Candidate	Gough Whitlam	Lionel Bowen	Frank Crean
Caucus vote	36 (57.1%)	14 (22.2%)	13 (20.6%)
Leader before election
Gough Whitlam
Elected Leader
Gough Whitlam

A leadership spill in the Australian Labor Party, the party of opposition in the Parliament of Australia, was held on 27 January 1976, the date of the first Caucus meeting following the 1975 election.

Dismissed Prime Minister Gough Whitlam was comfortably re-elected leader of the ALP ahead of senior MPs Lionel Bowen and Frank Crean on the first ballot. A much more extensive series of ballots was required to fill the deputy leadership with eight contenders narrowed down to a final ballot seeing Tom Uren narrowly defeat Paul Keating 33 votes to 30.

To date, this is the last Australian Labor Party leadership spill at the federal level to be contested by more than two candidates.

== Candidates ==
- Lionel Bowen, 53, former minister for manufacturing industry, member for Kingsford Smith
- Frank Crean, 59, incumbent deputy leader, former minister for overseas trade, member for Melbourne Ports
- Gough Whitlam, 59, incumbent leader, member for Werriwa

== Withdrawn candidates ==
- Gordon Bryant, former minister for the Capital Territory, member for Wills

== Potential candidates who declined to run ==
- Bill Hayden, former treasurer, member for Oxley

== Results ==
Australian Labor Party Deputy Leadership spill, 1976
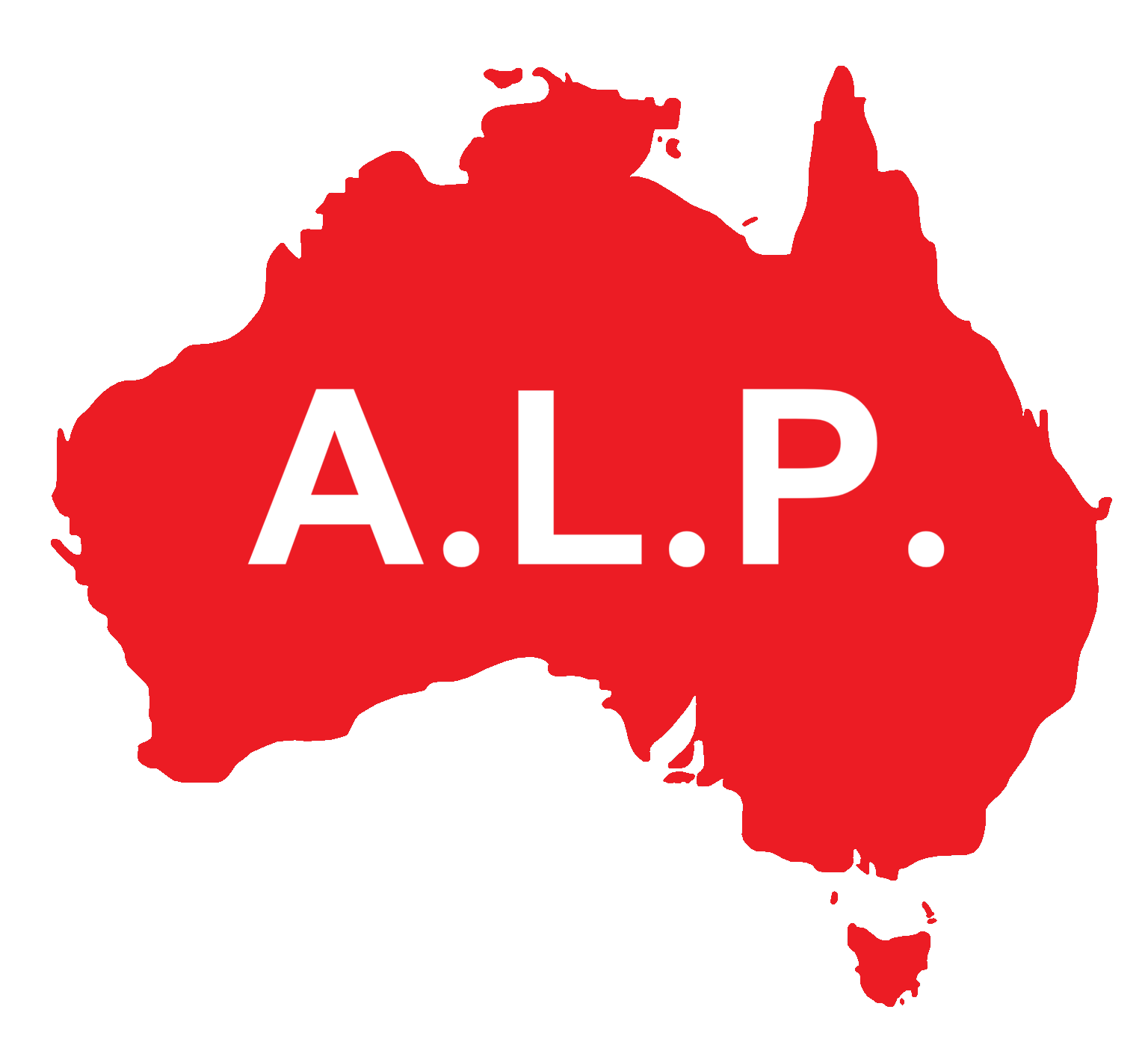

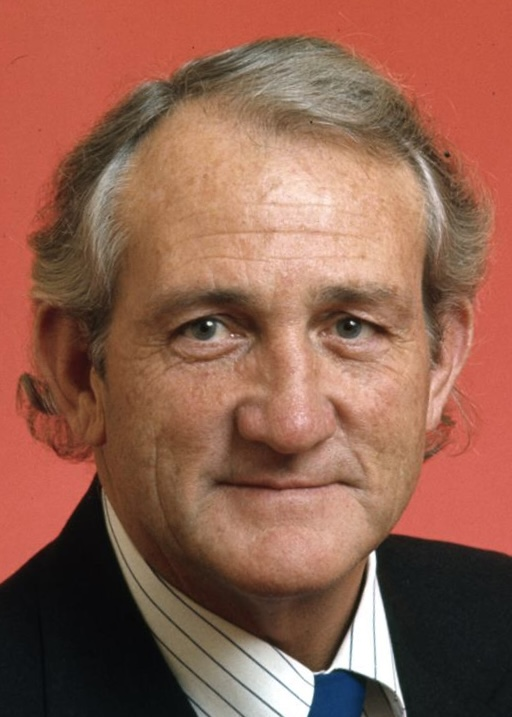

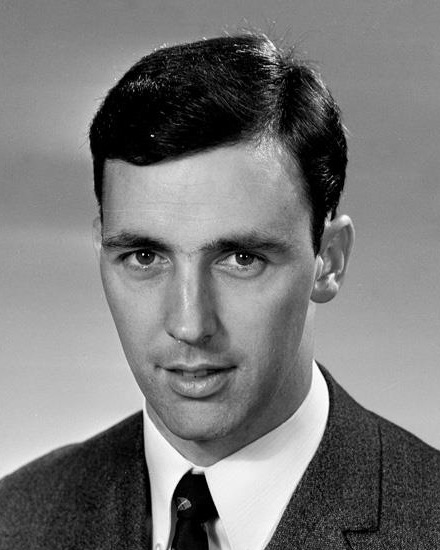
Candidate	Tom Uren	Paul Keating
Third ballot	33 (52.4%)	30 (47.6%)
Deputy Leader before election
Frank Crean
Deputy Leader after election
Tom Uren

=== Leader ===
The following table gives the ballot results:

Name	Votes	Percentage
Gough Whitlam	36	57.14
Lionel Bowen	14	22.22
Frank Crean	13	20.63

=== Deputy leader ===
The following table gives the ballot results:

Candidate	1st ballot	2nd ballot	3rd ballot
Tom Uren	15	26	33
Paul Keating	13	21	30
Mick Young	13	16	Eliminated
Kim Beazley	6	Eliminated	
Gordon Bryant	5	Eliminated	
Gordon Scholes	4	Eliminated	
Moss Cass	4	Eliminated	
Les Johnson	3	Eliminated	

== See also ==
- 1975 Australian federal election
- 1975 Australian constitutional crisis
