= Edward Dixon (politician) =

Australian politician

Edward Dixon MP
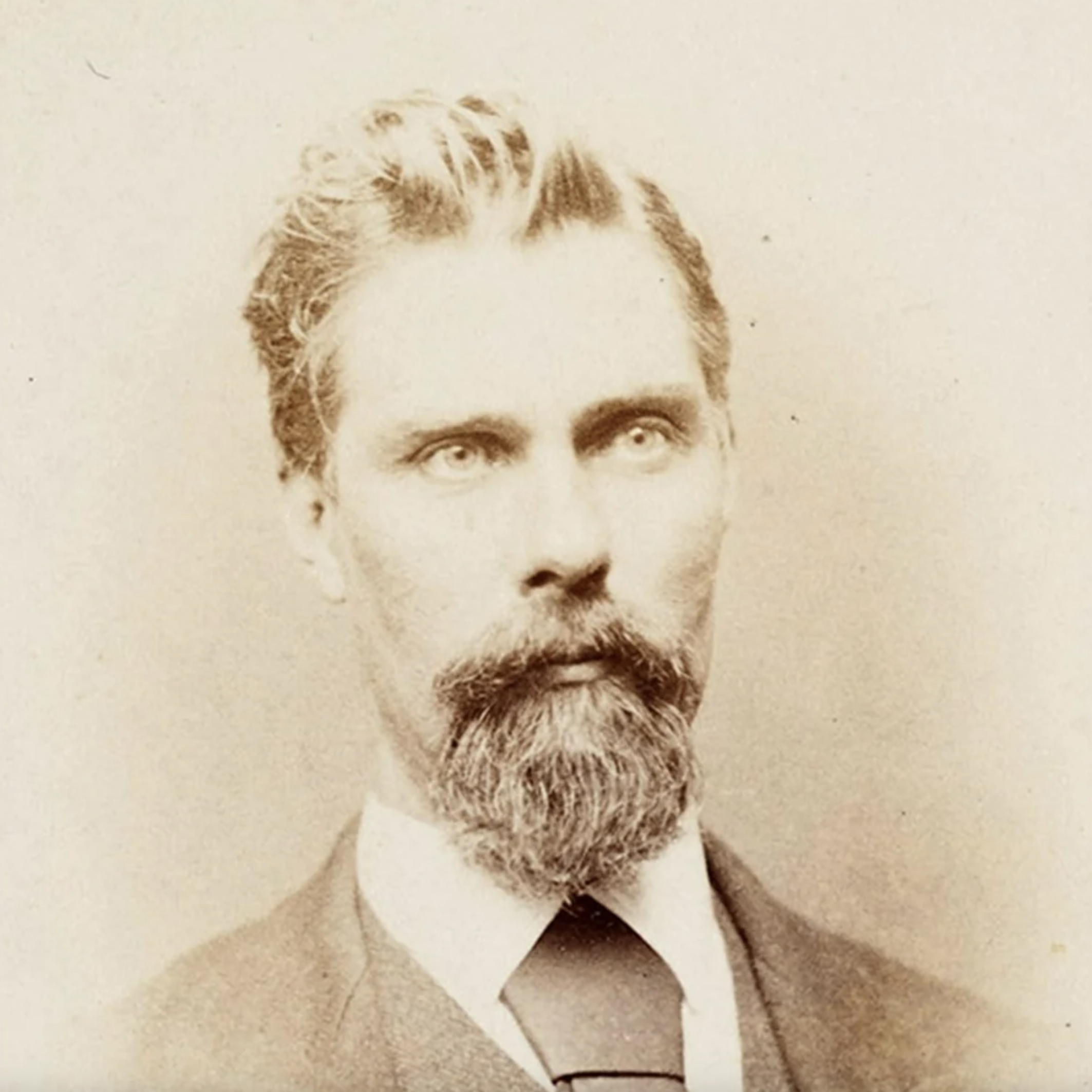

Member of the Victorian Legislative Assembly for St Kilda
- In office 1 May 1874 – 1 February 1880
- Preceded by: James Stephen
- Succeeded by: Joseph Harris

Member of the Victorian Legislative Assembly for Prahran
- In office 1 April 1889 – 1 September 1894
- Preceded by: New seat
- Succeeded by: Frederick Gray

Personal details
- Born: 1833 Lymington, Hampshire
- Died: 5 April 1905 (aged 71–72) Caulfield
- Party: Unaligned
- Spouse: Jean Blackwood
- Occupation: Accountant

Edward John Dixon (1833 – 5 April 1905) was a member of the Victorian Legislative Assembly for St Kilda from 1874 until 1880, and the member for Prahran from 1889 to 1894. The Prahran Chronicle attributed his loss in 1894 to his support of the Patterson government.

Victorian Legislative Assembly
Preceded by James Stephen	Member for St Kilda; 1874–1880	Succeeded by Joseph Harris
New seat	Member for Prahran; 1889–1894	Succeeded by Frederick Gray
