= Stephen Crean =

Australian public servant

Stephen Lamont Crean (12 July 1947 – August 1985) was an Australian public servant, who was the son of Frank Crean and brother of Simon and David Crean, all politicians.

Crean came to national attention in Australia due to his 1985 disappearance while skiing and the scale of the unsuccessful search to find him. He disappeared after skiing out of Charlotte Pass, New South Wales, launching one of the most intensive searches in Australian history. He was declared dead at age 38. His remains were found in 1987.

== Education and adult life ==
Crean was educated at Melbourne High School and studied at Monash University. He completed an arts degree at the Australian National University. He joined the Commonwealth Public Service in April, 1968, as a clerk with the Department of Supply and Transport. In 1972 he moved to the Department of Overseas Trade, and in 1974 joined the Department of Transport.

Crean was married with three children.

For over six years Crean served on the executive of the Scout Association in Canberra.

== Disappearance and search ==
On 6 August 1985, he set off from Charlotte Pass ski village, possibly intending to ski to the nearby Thredbo ski resort. It is believed that, as he travelled, Crean became lost in the falling snow and died of exposure. His disappearance resulted in one of the most intensive searches undertaken in the Australian snowfields, involving at times two helicopters and 50 searchers but the search did not recover his body.

A final, unsuccessful, search was undertaken in November 1985.

== Discovery ==
Seventeen months later in January 1987, a walker found his skeletal remains by chance, only a few kilometres from Charlotte Pass and Thredbo. Police at Khancoban received by mail Crean's wallet and identity papers. Police later arrested Stephen James Forsythe, who had stumbled upon a skeleton while walking in Kosciuszko and had reportedly removed the skull.

== Outcomes ==
Crean's disappearance resulted in an extensive debate about the methodology of searching for missing persons. The police were criticised for failing to utilise local knowledge and experience, the lack of experience of many of the police involved in the search, and poor co-ordination of air support. They were also criticised for being overly optimistic, which possibly resulted in initial complacency at Crean's safe return.

Crean's disappearance, and consequent search for him, is considered a reference event, and is referred to in contemporaneous comment and the reporting of later similar events, and also by members of the public, over the following decades.
