= Clem Newton-Brown =

Australian politician

Clem Newton-Brown OAM

Member of the Victorian Legislative Assembly for Prahran
- In office 27 November 2010 – 29 November 2014
- Preceded by: Tony Lupton
- Succeeded by: Sam Hibbins

Personal details
- Born: 3 September 1967 (age 59) Hawthorn, Victoria
- Party: Liberal Party
- Education: University of Edinburgh, Monash University
- Profession: Barrister

Clement Arundel Newton-Brown OAM (born 3 September 1967) is a former Australian politician and entrepreneur who served as the member for Prahran in the Victorian Legislative Assembly.

== Political career ==
Prior to his election, he worked as a barrister, specializing in planning law as well as running a series of small businesses—including the first Yarra River water taxi service, BBQ Boats and a café on an island under the Southgate footbridge. He was elected the youngest ever Deputy Lord Mayor of Melbourne in 1999 at 32 years of age.

Newton-Brown stood for the seat of Prahran in 2006 but was unsuccessful. At the 2010 Victorian election, he ran a high-profile campaign and defeated two-term Labor Party member, Tony Lupton. He lost the seat at the 2014 Victorian election to the Greens candidate Sam Hibbins. It was only the second Victorian Lower House seat to be won by the Greens.

== Post politics ==
From 2018 onwards, he founded Skyportz, a company working on urban infrastructure for flying taxis. As CEO of Skyportz, he has been actively working with regulators, planning authorities, and property partners to develop vetiport pad designs and prepare for "advanced air mobility".

== Personal life ==
Newton-Brown was born in Hawthorn and is a long-term resident of Prahran. He graduated with a degrees in Law and Arts from Monash University in 1991. In 2019, he was awarded a Medal of the Order of Australia (OAM) for services to the Victorian Parliament and the community of Melbourne.

Clem is married with 3 teenage children.

Victorian Legislative Assembly
Preceded by Tony Lupton	Member for Prahran; 2010–2014	Succeeded by Sam Hibbins
