= Richard Fetherston (politician) =

Australian politician

Richard Herbert Joseph Fetherston
- Born: 2 May 1864; Carlton, Victoria, Australia
- Died: 3 June 1943 (aged 79); St. Kilda, Victoria, Australia
- Occupation: Surgeon
- Spouse: Victoria Amelia Gourlay (m. 1894)
Richard Fetherston
- First Australian Imperial Force
- Allegiance: Australia
- Branch: Medical Services
- Service years: 1914-1919
- Rank: Major-General
- Commands: Medical Services
- Colonial forces of Australia
- Allegiance: British
- Branch: Victorian Militia
- Service years: 1887-1900
- Rank: Lieutenant-colonel

Member of the Victorian Legislative Assembly for Prahran
- In office 1921–1924
- Preceded by: Alexander Parker
- Succeeded by: Arthur Jackson

Personal details
- Party: Nationalist

Richard Herbert Joseph Fetherston (2 May 1864 – 3 June 1943) was an Australian medical doctor and politician.

== Early life ==
He was born in Carlton to medical practitioner Gerald Henry Fetherston and matron Sarah Ellen Harvey. He attended Wesley College and Alma Road Grammar School before travelling to Ireland, where he was a student at the Royal College of Surgeons and Trinity College in Dublin. In 1884 he received the Royal College's Licentiate, and later studied at the University of Edinburgh, receiving his Bachelor of Medicine and Master of Surgery in 1886 and his Doctorate of Medicine in 1888.

== Personal life ==
Fetherston married Victoria Amelia Gourlay on 4 July 1894; they had three children.

== Career ==
Fetherston returned to Melbourne and worked in his father's practice in Prahran. From 1891 he was resident medical officer at the Women's Hospital, and also had a practice of his own. He served on Prahran City Council from 1893 to 1899, and from 1912 ran a specialist practice in Collins Street for obstetrics and gynaecology.

From 1914 to 1919 he served as director-general of the Australian Imperial Force's medical services; he served in the field in Egypt, Gallipoli and England, rose to the rank of major-general and was twice mentioned in dispatches.

He was also the first honorary gynaecologist at the Royal Melbourne Hospital from 1914 to 1924. In 1921 he was elected to the Victorian Legislative Assembly as the Nationalist member for Prahran, but he was defeated in 1924. He returned to medical practice and became a fellow of the Royal Australasian College of Surgeons in 1927.

== Death ==
Fetherston died at St Kilda in 1943.

Victorian Legislative Assembly
| Preceded by Alexander Parker | Member for Prahran; 1921–1924 | Succeeded by Arthur Jackson |
