= Arthur Jackson (Australian politician) =

Australian politician (1874–1957)

Arthur Richard Jackson (7 December 1874 − 12 January 1957) was an English-born Australian politician.

Jackson was born in Stourbridge to wood pattern maker David Jackson and Sarah Dinah Hall. He came to Newcastle, New South Wales, at the age of twelve and worked in the coal mines. He travelled widely around Australia and New Zealand, and around 1895 married Ellen Andrews, with whom he had three children. He settled in Victoria around 1912 and managed a grocery store. He served on Prahran City Council from 1922 to 1924.

Jackson 1924 he was elected to the Victorian Legislative Assembly as the Labor member for Prahran. He left the Labor Party in 1932 after supporting the Premiers' Plan, and was defeated in the election of that year. He then became a draper at Colac, and was readmitted to the Labor Party, contesting Polwarth in 1940 and 1943 and Prahran in 1945. He retired to Melbourne and died at South Yarra in 1957.

Victorian Legislative Assembly
Preceded by Richard Fetherston	Member for Prahran; 1924–1932	Succeeded by John Ellis
