= Alexander Parker (politician) =

Australian politician

Alexander Frederick Parker (born 8 November 1891, date of death unknown) was an Australian politician.

He was born in South Melbourne to labourer William Parker and Mary Ann McCallum. He was a law clerk before serving in the Australian Imperial Force during World War I; he was wounded at Ypres. He held various business interests after the war, and on 15 December 1920 married Frances Alma Narracott, with whom he had one son. In 1920 he was elected to the Victorian Legislative Assembly as the Labor member for Prahran; he had previously contested Barwon in 1914 and the English constituency of Kingswinford in 1917. Although he survived a court challenge on the grounds of undeclared insolvency in 1921, he lost his seat at the election later that year. In 1922 he was convicted of receiving stolen goods and sentenced to twelve months' jail. After his release he was a land salesman and later a lobbyist in Canberra, eventually settling in Sydney in the mid-1950s. Parker's date of death is unknown but believed to be in the mid-1960s.

Victorian Legislative Assembly
Preceded by Donald Mackinnon	Member for Prahran; 1920–1921	Succeeded by Richard Fetherston
