= Rachel Westaway =

Australian politician

Rachel Westaway MP
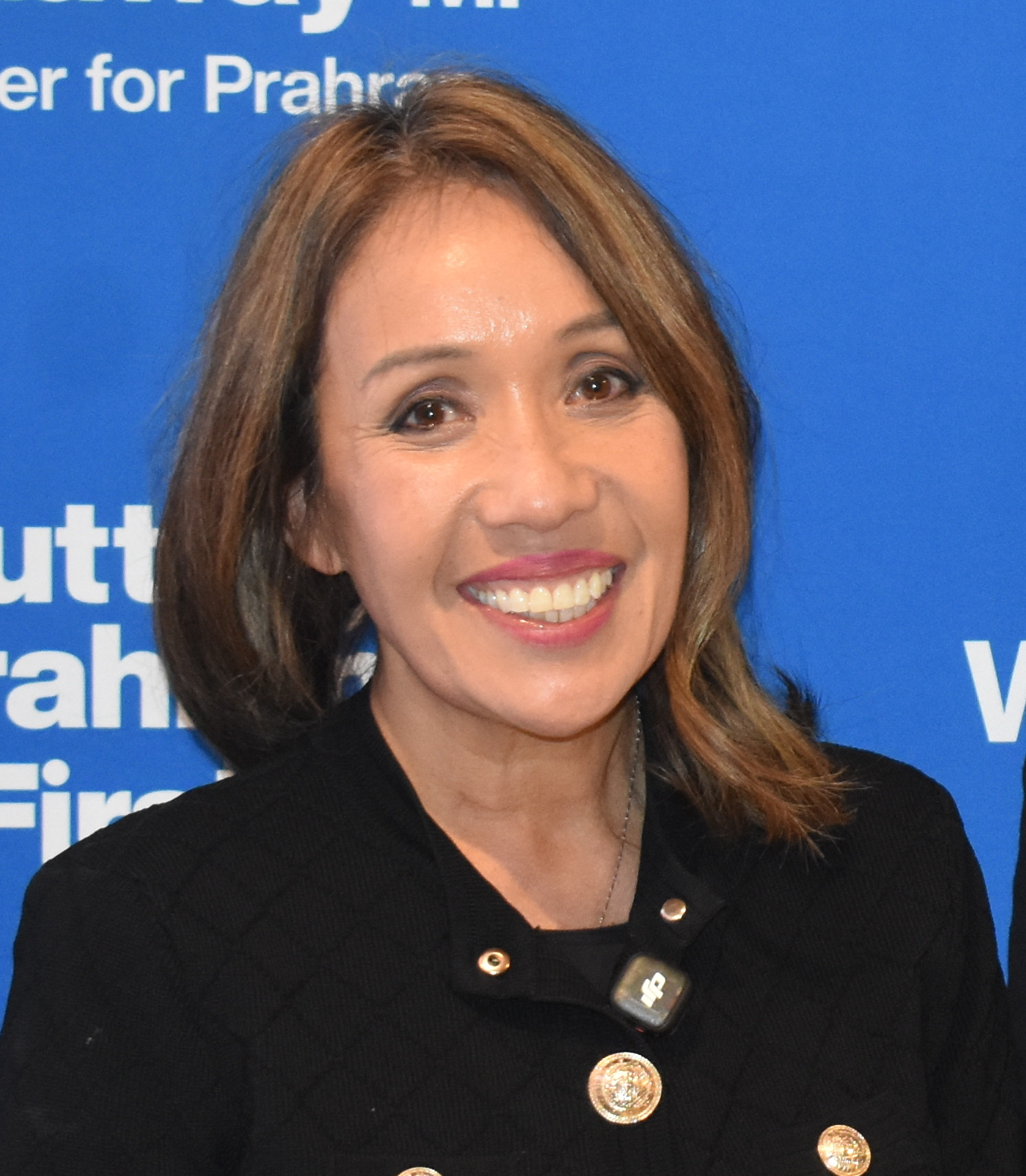
- Westaway in 2026

Member of the Victorian Legislative Assembly for Prahran
- Incumbent
- Assumed office 8 February 2025
- Preceded by: Sam Hibbins

Personal details
- Born: Rachel Eamsophana
- Party: Victorian Liberal Party
- Children: 3
- Website: https://www.rachelwestaway.com.au/

Rachel Westaway (née Eamsophana) is an Australian politician serving as the member for Prahran in the Victorian Legislative Assembly since winning the 2025 Prahran state by-election. She is a member of the Victorian Liberal Party.

== Career ==
Under her previous name Rachel Creek, she was a candidate for the New South Wales Legislative Council in the 2003 New South Wales state election. She was in 10th place on the party list and was not elected.

Westaway served for many years as a senior member of the Administrative Appeals Tribunal, first appointed in 2003 to the MRT and RRT, until the AAT was abolished in October 2024. She is a former Assistant Freedom of Information Commissioner for Victoria after an initial career spanning senior executive marketing positions at Cadbury, The Age Newspaper, SBS and The National Trust. She was also the former Executive Director of Country Press NSW spanning 7 years.

=== Political career ===
At the 2025 Prahran state by-election, Westaway was elected to the Victorian Legislative Assembly with a 13.4% two-party swing in her favour.

The by-election was triggered by the resignation of Greens MP Sam Hibbins following revelations of an extramarital affair with a staffer and allegations of inappropriate behavior toward an intern.

Westaway's campaign was based on addressing "law-and-order" issues, including around the Chapel Street precinct.

At the time of her election, Westaway became the first Liberal candidate for a lower house seat across Australia to recover a seat from the Greens, after Prahran became the first lower house seat the Liberal Party had lost to the Greens, in 2014.

In October 2025, Westaway was appointed Shadow Assistant Minister for Small Business and Shadow Assistant Minister for Hospitality.

Following the change in leadership of the Victorian Liberal Party in November 2025 and subsequent Shadow Cabinet reshuffle, Westaway was appointed Shadow Assistant Minister to the Leader of the Opposition (Metropolitan), Shadow Assistant Minister for Tourism, Sport and Major Events, and Shadow Assistant Minister for Melbourne.

== Personal life ==
Westaway has lived in South Yarra for 20 years. She was born, raised and educated in Melbourne and is of Thai-Chinese descent. She was a former President of the Thai Australian Chamber.

She is married to husband Simon Westaway and they have three teenage children.

Victorian Legislative Assembly
Preceded by Sam Hibbins	Member for Prahran; 2025–present	Incumbent
