= Leonie Burke =

Australian politician

Leonie Therese Burke, née Hemingway (born 27 January 1949) is a former Australian politician. She was the Liberal member for Prahran in the Victorian Legislative Assembly from 1996 to 2002.

Burke was born in Melbourne to Douglas and Marie Hemingway, and was educated at Genazzano Convent (1954–66) and Invergowrie College (1967). Between 1971 and 1986 she held nursing and secretarial positions and also the family directorship. She became a Prahran City Councillor in 1986 and served as Mayor from 1990 to 1992. After leaving the council in 1993, she became Chair of the Local Government Board until her entry into state politics in 1996.

In 1996, Burke was elected to the Victorian Legislative Assembly as the Liberal member for Prahran. She was the Parliamentary Secretary for Planning and Local Government from 1998 until the Kennett Government's defeat in 1999, when she became Shadow Minister for Local Government and Women's Affairs. She was defeated by Labor candidate Tony Lupton in 2002.

Parliament of Victoria
Preceded by Don Hayward	Member for Prahran; 1996–2002	Succeeded by Tony Lupton
