= Frederick Gray (politician) =

Australian politician

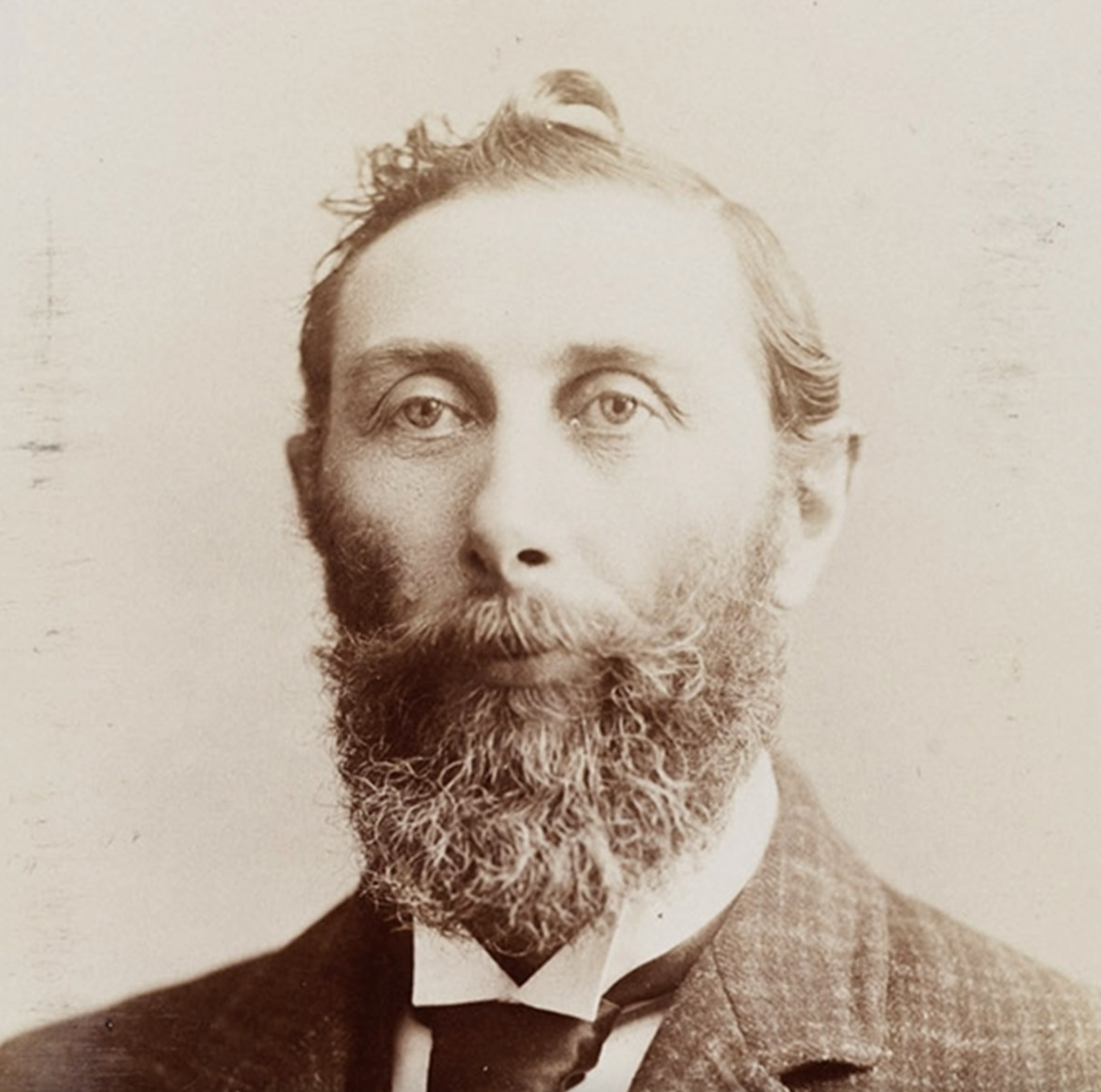
Image of Frederick Gray

Frederick Charles Gray (18 April 1853 – 13 December 1933) was a Labor member of the Legislative Assembly of the Parliament of Victoria for the electoral district of Prahran from 1894 to 1900.
