= Robert Pettiona =

Australian politician

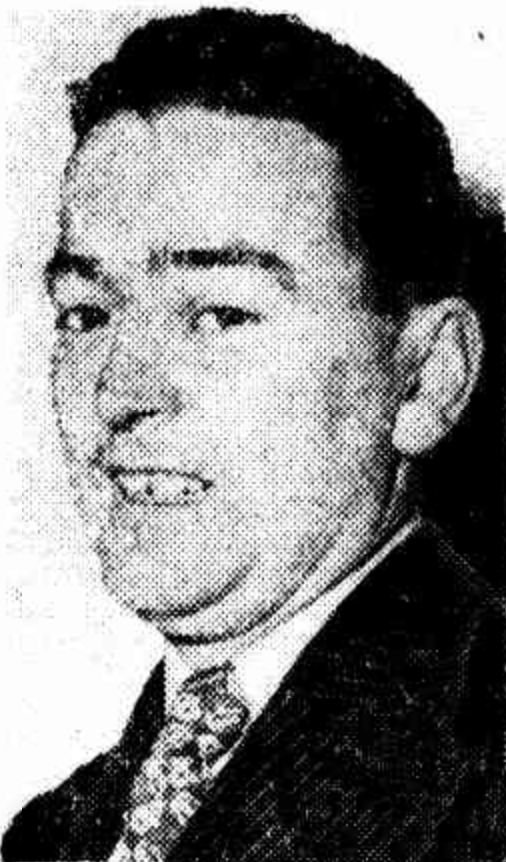
Victorian Labor Party MP Robert Pettiona

Robert Francis Lindsay Pettiona (7 July 1915 – 25 November 1980) was an Australian politician.

He was born in South Melbourne to waterside worker John James Pettiona and Sylvia Conroy. He attended Catholic schools but identified as agnostic in later life. From 1931 he was a rubber worker for Dunlop Tyres. On 24 April 1940 he married Marguerita Wilde, with whom he had three children. He was president of the Federated Rubber and Allied Workers' Union of Australia from 1943 to 1951 and also president and secretary of the Windsor branch of the Labor Party.

In 1951 he won a by-election for the Victorian Legislative Assembly seat of Prahran. He served until his defeat in 1955. From 1955 to 1979 he was federal general secretary of the Federated Rubber and Allied Workers' Union. Pettiona died in South Brisbane in 1980.

Victorian Legislative Assembly
| Preceded by Frank Crean | Member for Prahran; 1951–1955 | Succeeded by Sam Loxton |
