= Sam Hibbins =

Australian politician (born 1982)

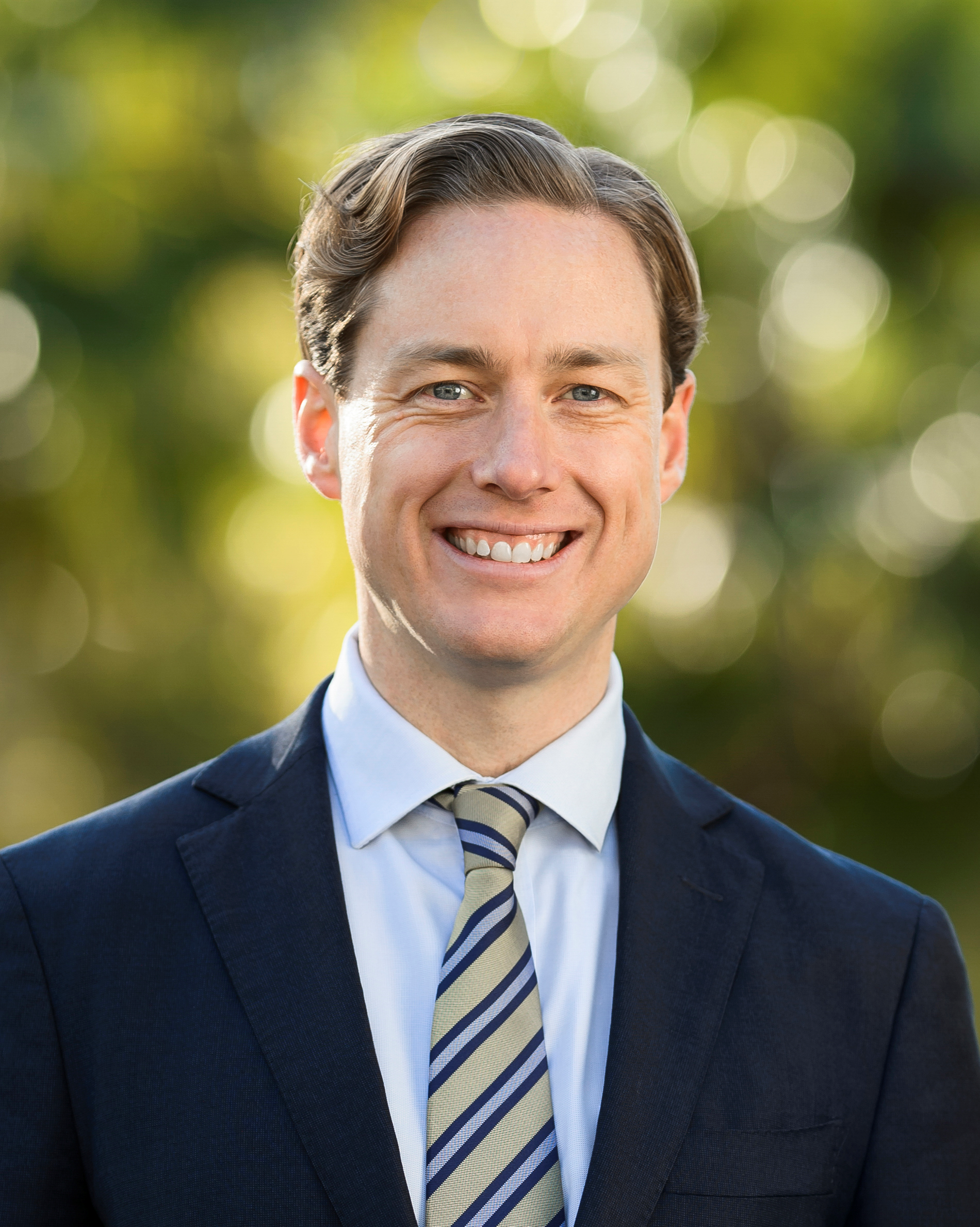
- Hibbins in 2021

Deputy leader of the Victorian Greens
- In office 23 April 2024 – 29 October 2024 Serving with Sarah Mansfield
- Leader: Ellen Sandell
- Preceded by: Ellen Sandell

Member of the Victorian Legislative Assembly for Prahran
- In office 29 November 2014 – 23 November 2024
- Preceded by: Clem Newton-Brown
- Succeeded by: Rachel Westaway

Personal details
- Born: Samuel Peter Hibbins; 18 February 1982 (age 44)
- Party: Independent
- Other political affiliations: Greens (until 2024)
- Education: Australian Catholic University; Macquarie University
- Occupation: Politician
- Website: http://www.samhibbins.com

Samuel Peter Hibbins (born 18 February 1982) is an Australian politician who served as the member for Prahran in the Victorian Legislative Assembly between 2014 and 2024. He served as the co-deputy leader of the Victorian Greens from April 2024 until resigning from the party to sit as an independent in November 2024.

Prior to his election, Hibbins was a councillor on the City of Stonnington from 2012 to 2014. Before that, Hibbins was a youth worker at the Victorian Government's Department of Human Services. He had previously contested the seat of Malvern at the 2010 state election, and the seat of Higgins at the federal election in the same year.

== Political career ==
=== 2014 State Election ===
Hibbins contested the Victorian seat of Prahran, the state's smallest seat, in 2014. The seat was tightly contested, with Hibbins preferred over Labor's Neil Pharaoh by only 31 votes, and defeating incumbent Clem Newtown-Brown on the two-party preferred vote. The Hibbins campaign focus included building a new secondary school and the redevelopment of South Yarra railway station.

=== 2018 State Election ===
Hibbins was re-elected in 2018. He has held the Victorian Greens' portfolios of Spokesperson Major Events, Education and Youth since December 2018. He has also held the portfolios of Spokesperson for Consumer Affairs, Housing, Planning, Local Government, and Industrial Relations since June 2020. In 2021, Hibbins's proposed South Yarra railway station upgrades were completed.

=== Expulsion from Greens party room ===
On 28 October 2024, Hibbins resigned from the Greens party room to sit as an independent, after it emerged that he had been having an extramarital affair with a staff member from his office. Party leader Ellen Sandell had sacked Hibbins as co-deputy leader and from the Greens shadow cabinet on 29 October after being informed of the affair by Parliamentary Services. However, she did not announce it to the press until 1 November because she had not been able to meet with the staffer until 31 October. Saying that Hibbins had lost her trust and the trust of other Greens MPs, Sandell made clear after Hibbins resigned from the party that he would never be allowed to run for the Greens again. Hibbins described the affair as a "human mistake". Hibbins resigned as a member of parliament on 23 November after claiming his office had been ransacked, triggering a by-election in Prahran.

== Personal life ==
Hibbins is married with two children.

Victorian Legislative Assembly
Preceded by Clem Newton-Brown	Member for Prahran; 2014–2024	Succeeded by Rachel Westaway
