= Electoral district of Prahran =

State electoral district of Victoria, Australia

Prahran Victoria—Legislative Assembly
- Interactive map of electoral district boundaries from the 2022 state election
- State: Victoria
- Created: 1889
- MP: Rachel Westaway
- Party: Liberal
- Namesake: Prahran
- Electors: 50,373 (2018)
- Area: 11 km^{2} (4.2 sq mi)
- Demographic: Inner metropolitan

Prahran is an electoral district of the Legislative Assembly in the Australian state of Victoria. It was created by the Electoral Act Amendment Act 1888, taking effect at the 1889 elections. The electorate is the state’s smallest by area, covering a little under 11 km^{2} (4.2 sq mi) in the inner south-east of Melbourne. It includes the suburbs of South Yarra, Prahran and Windsor, as well as parts of Southbank, St Kilda and St Kilda East.

== Overview ==
Prahran has tended to be a marginal seat throughout its existence, repeatedly changing between the Labor Party and its successive conservative rivals. It has not, however, been a bellwether seat, as the changes of party control have often not coincided with changes of government. In the 1980s and 1990s, the electorate became gradually more conservative as a result of increasing gentrification in the inner suburbs, resulting in seventeen years of Liberal control from 1985 until 2002. This trend was broken in the 2002 election, which saw popular local member and shadow minister Leonie Burke defeated by Labor rising star Tony Lupton on an unexpectedly large swing, coinciding with Labor’s massive win that year. The seat has since become increasingly progressive, having been won by either Labor or the Greens in five out of the last six elections while the Liberal Party's primary vote has declined from slightly above the state average to significantly below the state average.

The seat was strongly targeted by the Liberal Party during the 2006 election, with high-profile barrister Clem Newton-Brown narrowly preselected as their candidate after a tight contest. Though Newton-Brown ran a thorough campaign, he was not successful. Following his success in the 2006 election, Tony Lupton was promoted to the position of Parliamentary Secretary for Industry and Innovation. Newton-Brown stood again at the 2010 election and was this time successful. He re-contested the 2014 election but lost to Sam Hibbins of the Greens. Along with the seat of Melbourne it was the first win for the Greens in the Victorian Legislative Assembly.

Hibbins increased his two-candidate-preferred margin to 7.5% at the 2018 election, but only narrowly defeated Labor by 262 votes in the 3-candidate-preferred count. At the 2022 election, a large swing to the Greens saw them take first place on primary votes before comfortably defeating the Liberal Party on a 2-candidate-preferred basis, retaining the seat for a third term with an increased margin of 12%.

Hibbins resigned from the Greens and briefly sat as an independent crossbencher after having an extramarital affair with a staffer. Hibbins subsequently resigned from parliament and a by-election ensued which was a race between the Greens and Liberals, with Labor not contesting. Tony Lupton contested as an independent. The by-election was won narrowly by the Liberals' Rachel Westaway with a swing of 13.4% to the Liberals, the seat returning to conservative hands for the first time since 2014. This was due to numerous factors such as Lupton directing preferences to the Liberals, low voter turnout and John Pesutto's leadership of the Liberals. The seat is currently the third most marginal Liberal held seat in the state.

== Members for Prahran ==
Image	Member	Party	Term	Notes
	Edward Dixon (1833–1905)	Independent	1 April 1889 – 1 September 1894	
	Frederick Gray (1853–1933)	Labour	1 October 1894 – 1 October 1900	
	Donald Mackinnon (1859–1932)	Liberal	1 October 1900 – 21 October 1920	
	Alexander Parker (1891–1970s)	Labor	21 October 1920 – 30 August 1921	
	Richard Fetherston (1964–1943)	Nationalist	30 August 1921 – 26 June 1924	
	Arthur Jackson (1874–1957)	Labor	26 June 1924 – 14 May 1932	
	John Ellis (1872–1945)	United Australia	14 May 1932 – 5 March 1945	Died in office
	John Ellis (1872–1945)	Liberal	5 March 1945 – 2 July 1945	Died in office
	Bill Quirk (1891–1948)	Labor	18 August 1945 – 16 November 1948	Won by-election. Died in office
	Frank Crean (1916–2008)	Labor	22 January 1949 – 17 March 1951	Previously member for Albert Park. Won by-election. Resigned in 1951 to successfully contest federal seat of Melbourne Ports and later served as Deputy Prime Minister
	Robert Pettiona (1915–1980)	Labor	16 June 1951 – 28 May 1955	Won by-election. Lost seat
	Sam Loxton (1921–2011)	Liberal	28 May 1955 – 5 May 1979	
	Bob Miller (1941–)	Labor	5 May 1979 – 2 March 1985	Did not seek re-election in order to unsuccessfully contest Legislative Council seat of Monash
	Don Hayward (1932–)	Liberal	2 March 1985 – 30 March 1996	
	Leonie Burke (1949–)	Liberal	30 March 1996 – 30 November 2002	Lost seat
	Tony Lupton (1957–)	Labor	30 November 2002 – 27 November 2010	Lost seat
	Clem Newton-Brown (1967–)	Liberal	27 November 2010 – 29 November 2014	Lost seat
	Sam Hibbins (1982–)	Greens	29 November 2014 – 1 November 2024	Resigned from Greens after admitting to extramarital affair with staff member. Resigned from parliament
	Sam Hibbins (1982–)	Independent	1 November 2024– 23 November 2024	Resigned from Greens after admitting to extramarital affair with staff member. Resigned from parliament
	Rachel Westaway	Liberal	8 February 2025 – present	Won by-election. Incumbent

== Election results ==
2025 Prahran state by-election
Party	Candidate	Votes	%	±%
Liberal	Rachel Westaway	11,443	36.19	+5.11
Greens	Angelica Di Camillo	11,442	36.19	−0.21
Independent	Tony Lupton	4,021	12.72	+12.72
Independent	Nathan Chisholm	1,672	5.29	+5.29
Animal Justice	Faith Fuhrer	879	2.78	−0.44
Independent	Janine Hendry	505	1.60	+1.60
Independent	Buzz Billman	465	1.47	+1.47
Sustainable Australia	Dennis Bilic	430	1.36	+1.36
Family First	Geneviève Gilbert	340	1.08	−0.52
Libertarian	Mark Dessau	292	0.92	+0.92
Independent	Alan Menadue	126	0.40	−0.74
Total formal votes		31,615	96.14	−0.84
Informal votes		1,271	3.86	+0.84
Turnout		32,886	68.28	−14.42
Two-candidate-preferred result
Liberal	Rachel Westaway	16,234	51.35	+13.36
Greens	Angelica Di Camillo	15,381	48.65	−13.36
Liberal gain from Greens		Swing	+13.36	

Primary vote results in Prahran (Parties that did not get 5% of the vote are omitted)
Liberal
Labor
Greens
View source data.
Two-candidate-preferred results in Prahran View source data.
