= Frank Crean =

Australian politician (1916–2008)

The Honourable Frank Crean
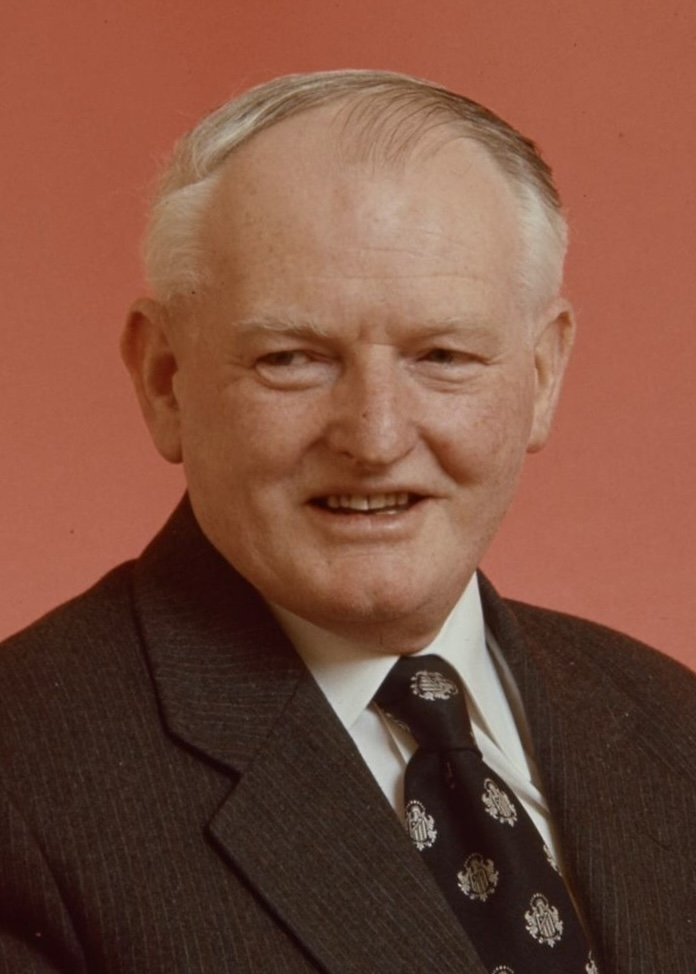
- Official portrait, 1974

Deputy Prime Minister of Australia
- In office 14 July 1975 – 11 November 1975
- Prime Minister: Gough Whitlam
- Preceded by: Jim Cairns
- Succeeded by: Doug Anthony

Minister for Overseas Trade
- In office 11 December 1974 – 11 November 1975
- Prime Minister: Gough Whitlam
- Preceded by: Jim Cairns
- Succeeded by: Doug Anthony

Treasurer of Australia
- In office 19 December 1972 – 11 December 1974
- Prime Minister: Gough Whitlam
- Preceded by: Gough Whitlam
- Succeeded by: Jim Cairns

Deputy Leader of the Labor Party
- In office 2 July 1975 – 27 January 1976
- Leader: Gough Whitlam
- Preceded by: Dr. Jim Cairns
- Succeeded by: Tom Uren

Member of the Australian Parliament for Melbourne Ports
- In office 28 April 1951 – 10 November 1977
- Preceded by: Jack Holloway
- Succeeded by: Clyde Holding

Member of the Victorian Legislative Assembly
- In office 22 January 1949 – 17 March 1951
- Preceded by: William Quirk
- Succeeded by: Robert Pettiona
- Constituency: Prahran
- In office 10 November 1945 – 7 November 1947
- Preceded by: William Haworth
- Succeeded by: Roy Schilling
- Constituency: Albert Park

Personal details
- Born: Francis Daniel Crean; 28 February 1916 Hamilton, Victoria, Australia
- Died: 2 December 2008 (aged 92) Melbourne, Victoria, Australia
- Party: Labor
- Spouse: Mary Findlay (m. 1945)
- Children: Stephen; Simon; David
- Education: Hamilton High School; University of Melbourne

Francis Daniel Crean (28 February 1916 – 2 December 2008) was an Australian politician who served as a member of the House of Representatives from 1951 to 1977, representing the Labor Party. He was a minister in the Whitlam government, including as Treasurer from 1972 to 1974 and the fifth deputy prime minister for a few months in 1975.

Crean was born in Hamilton, Victoria. He attended Melbourne High School and the University of Melbourne, and subsequently worked as a tax accountant. Crean was elected to the Victorian Legislative Assembly in 1945. He lost his seat in 1947 and reclaimed it in 1949, but quit state politics two years later to stand at the 1951 federal election. Crean spent the first 21 years of his career in federal politics in opposition, albeit as a frontbencher for most of that time. He became Treasurer after the 1972 election, but economic uncertainty and factional considerations meant he was replaced by Jim Cairns after two years. He was instead appointed Minister for Overseas Trade. Crean held that position until the government's dismissal in 1975, and for its final six months was also deputy prime minister, replacing Cairns when he became embroiled in the Khemlani affair. He left politics at the 1977 election. His son, Simon Crean, was a Member of Parliament from 1990 to 2013.

== Early life ==
Frank Crean was born in Hamilton, Victoria. His father, of Irish Catholic descent, worked as a bicycle-maker, while his mother was Presbyterian, the faith in which Crean was raised. During his youth, he was known as Francis, but later adopted the name Frank, partly to downplay his Irish Catholic heritage in a politically sensitive era.

He studied at the University of Melbourne, where he earned degrees in arts and commerce, along with a diploma in public administration. Following his studies, he worked as an accountant and tax consultant.

In 1946, Crean married Mary Findlay. The couple had three sons. Their eldest, Stephen Crean, disappeared while skiing near Charlotte Pass, New South Wales in August 1985 and died during a blizzard. Despite a major search operation, his remains were not discovered until over two years later. His second son, Simon Crean, served as federal leader of the Australian Labor Party from 2001 to 2003, and held ministerial positions in the governments of Bob Hawke, Paul Keating, Kevin Rudd, and Julia Gillard. The youngest son, David Crean, was a minister in the state Labor government of Tasmania.

== Politics ==
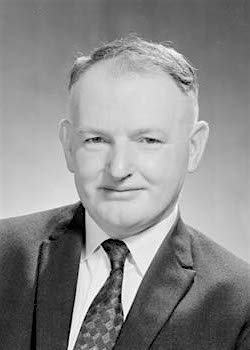
Crean in 1962

In 1945 Crean was elected to the Victorian Legislative Assembly, but was defeated in 1947. He was re-elected in 1949. He quit state politics in 1951, to stand for the safe Labor seat of Melbourne Ports in the House of Representatives. In Canberra, Crean advanced rapidly, since he was one of the few Labor members with formal qualifications in economics. Elected to the Opposition front-bench in 1956, he became, in effect, shadow Treasurer (although Labor did not have a formal shadow ministry until 1969). This position he held for 16 years. During the 1960s Crean was sometimes considered as a possible party leader, but his rather plodding public image meant that he was overtaken by Gough Whitlam, who became leader in 1967. When Whitlam finally led Labor to office at the 1972 election, Crean became Treasurer, although Whitlam had no real confidence in him. Crean's tenure coincided with the onset of high inflation and rising unemployment. He did not trust the orthodox economic advice he was getting from the Treasury, but he lacked the authority to challenge it. The leader of the Labor Left, Jim Cairns, attacked Crean's policies in the Cabinet, and in December 1974 Whitlam gave Cairns the Treasury and moved Crean to the Trade portfolio.

In July 1975 Whitlam sacked Cairns over his involvement in the Loans Affair, and Crean was elected party Deputy Leader and Deputy Prime Minister in his place, defeating Kim Beazley Sr. 47 votes to 31, with Frank Stewart receiving 11 and Kep Enderby 4.

He held this position until the dismissal of the Whitlam government in November 1975. After the election he contested the leadership, polling 13 votes to Lionel Bowen's 14 and Whitlam's 36. He retired from parliament in 1977.

== Later years ==
From 1978 to 2004, Crean was chairman of the New Hope Migrant and Refugee Centre. In July 2006 it was reported that he was too frail to travel interstate for Gough Whitlam's 90th birthday function.

Crean died following a short illness on 2 December 2008, the 36th anniversary of the election of the Whitlam government in 1972.

== See also ==
- Political families of Australia

== Bibliography ==
- Frith, Marion (1995). "Family Politics--Like Father, Like Son." The Age. 24 June.
- Griffiths, Tony (2005). Beautiful Lies: Australia from Menzies to Howard. Wakefield Press. ISBN 978-1-86254-590-8.
- Smyth, Paul (1 January 1994). Australian Social Policy. Sydney: University of New South Wales. ISBN 0-86840-262-1.
- Stewart, Ian (8 October 1974). "Inflation Troubles Australian Labor Party". The New York Times.
- Trumbull, Robert (4 February 1973). "PROBLEMS CLOUD WHITLAM'S IMAGE". The New York Times.

Parliament of Australia
Preceded by Jack Holloway	Member of Parliament for Melbourne Ports; 1951–1977	Succeeded by Clyde Holding
Preceded by Gough Whitlam	Treasurer; 1972–1974	Succeeded by Jim Cairns
Preceded by Jim Cairns	Minister for Overseas Trade; 1974–1975	Succeeded by Doug Anthony
Preceded by Jim Cairns	Deputy Prime Minister; 1975	Succeeded by Doug Anthony
Party political offices
Preceded by Jim Cairns	Deputy Leader of the Australian Labor Party; 1975	Succeeded by Tom Uren
Victorian Legislative Assembly
Preceded by William Haworth	Member for Albert Park; 1945–1947	Succeeded by Roy Schilling
