= Federated Rubber and Allied Workers' Union of Australia =

- Merged into: National Union of Storeworkers, Packers, Rubber and Allied Workers
- Founded: 1909
- Dissolved: 1988
- Headquarters: 55 Johnston Street, Port Melbourne, VIC
- Location: Australia
- Members: 20,000 (1973)
- Affiliations: ALP, ACTU, International Federation of Chemical, Energy, Mine and General Workers' Unions

The Federated Rubber and Allied Workers' Union of Australia was an Australian trade union which existed between 1909 and 1988. The union represented workers employed in manufacturing rubber, plastic, electrical cable, adhesive and abrasive products in Australia.

== History ==
The Federated Rubber and Allied Workers' Union was formed in 1909 and achieved registration in 1911 as the Rubber Workers' Union of Australia. By 1922 the union had a national membership of 2,000. The union's name was changed in 1933 to the Federated Rubber and Allied Workers' Union of Australia. Membership rose during the following decades, reaching 5150, of which 2,750 were employed in New South Wales and 2,400 in Victoria. Female workers made up 36% of the union's membership in 1946, an unusually high proportion for an Australian union at the time.

The union's membership was principally in the footwear and automotive industries, and membership decreased as these industries restructured in the late 20th century. The Federated Rubber and Allied Workers' Union amalgamated with the Federated Storemen and Packers Union in 1988 to form the National Union of Storeworkers, Packers, Rubber and Allied Workers. This body then merged with several other small unions in 1991 to form the National Union of Workers, which continues to provide representation for workers employed in the rubber industry.
