= John Ellis (Australian politician) =

Australian politician (1872–1945)

John McDonald Ellis (8 December 1872 – 2 July 1945) was an Australian politician.

Ellis was born in Bendigo to miner Thomas Ellis and Isabella McLean. He lived in Melbourne from around 1887, running a contracting firm with his brother. On 29 November 1899 he married Alice Rose Saunders, with whom he had three children. From 1926 to 1945 he served on Prahran City Council, and he was mayor from 1930 to 1932 and from 1944 to 1945.

Ellis was elected to the Victorian Legislative Assembly in 1932 as the United Australia Party member for Prahran. He served until his death in East Melbourne on 2 July 1945.

Victorian Legislative Assembly
Preceded by Arthur Jackson	Member for Prahran; 1932–1945	Succeeded by Bill Quirk
