= Bill Quirk (Australian politician) =

Australian politician

William Quirk (5 April 1891 – 16 November 1948) was an Australian politician.

He was born in Burrumbeet to railway platelayer Michael Quirk and Catherine Houlihan. He attended state schools and worked for the railways from 1907 to 1914, then becoming a postal technician. On 19 June 1917 he married Harriette Julia Madden, with whom he had a daughter. He was an active member of the Postal Employees' Union, and served on the Labor Party state executive from 1944 to 1948. In 1945 he won a by-election for the Victorian Legislative Assembly seat of Prahran. Quirk died in 1948 in East Melbourne.

Victorian Legislative Assembly
Preceded by John Ellis	Member for Prahran; 1945–1948	Succeeded by Frank Crean
