= Electoral results for the district of Albert Park =

Victoria, Australia, district election results

This is a list of electoral results for the Electoral district of Albert Park in Victorian state elections from 1889 to the present.

== Members for Albert Park ==
Member	Party	Term
John Nimmo	Liberal	1889–1892
John White	Conservative	1892–1902
George Elmslie	Labour	1902–1918
Joseph Hannan	Labor	1918–1919
Arthur Wallace	Labor	1919–1927
Robert Cuthbertson	Nationalist	1927–1929
Arthur Wallace	Labor	1929–1932
Arthur Wallace	Independent	1929–1932
Harry Drew	United Australia	1932–1937
Harry Drew	Independent	1932–1937
William Haworth	United Australia	1937–1944
William Haworth	Liberal	1944–1945
Frank Crean	Labor	1945–1947
Roy Schilling	Liberal	1947–1950
Keith Sutton	Labor	1950–1970
Val Doube	Labor	1970–1979
Bunna Walsh	Labor	1979–1992
John Thwaites	Labor	1992–2007
Martin Foley	Labor	2007–2022
Nina Taylor	Labor	2022–present

== Election results ==
=== Elections in the 2020s ===
2022 Victorian state election: Albert Park
Party	Candidate	Votes	%	±%
Labor	Nina Taylor	14,254	36.4	−7.0
Liberal	Lauren Sherson	11,659	29.8	−1.6
Greens	Kim Samiotis	8,178	20.9	+4.5
Independent	Georgie Dragwidge	2,294	5.9	+5.9
Animal Justice	Cassandra Westwood	1,207	3.1	−0.9
Liberal Democrats	Lance Smart	534	1.4	+1.4
Freedom	Elizabeth Antunovic	518	1.3	+1.3
Family First	Viorel Bradea	466	1.2	+1.2
Total formal votes		39,110	96.6	+1.4
Informal votes		1,396	3.4	−1.4
Turnout		40,506	83.0	−0.7
Two-party-preferred result
Labor	Nina Taylor	23,916	61.2	−1.9
Liberal	Lauren Sherson	15,194	38.8	+1.9
Labor hold		Swing	−1.9	

=== Elections in the 2010s ===
2018 Victorian state election: Albert Park
Party	Candidate	Votes	%	±%
Labor	Martin Foley	17,287	43.37	+11.04
Liberal	Andrew Bond	12,457	31.25	−10.24
Greens	Ogy Simic	6,601	16.56	−0.21
Animal Justice	Tamasin Ramsay	1,555	3.90	+3.90
Reason	Jarryd Bartle	1,079	2.71	−0.75
Sustainable Australia	Steven Armstrong	597	1.50	+1.50
Independent	Joseph Toscano	282	0.71	+0.71
Total formal votes		39,858	95.23	−0.64
Informal votes		1,997	4.77	+0.64
Turnout		41,855	85.51	−2.94
Two-party-preferred result
Labor	Martin Foley	25,161	63.13	+10.17
Liberal	Andrew Bond	14,696	36.87	−10.17
Labor hold		Swing	+10.17	

2014 Victorian state election: Albert Park
Party	Candidate	Votes	%	±%
Liberal	Shannon Eeles	15,177	41.5	+1.7
Labor	Martin Foley	11,826	32.3	+1.3
Greens	David Collis	6,134	16.8	−0.1
Independent	Tex Perkins	1,614	4.4	+4.4
Sex Party	James Hurley	1,263	3.5	−0.1
Independent	Steven Armstrong	289	0.8	+0.8
Family First	Deborah Geyer	273	0.7	0.0
Total formal votes		36,576	95.9	−0.3
Informal votes		1,575	4.1	+0.3
Turnout		38,151	88.5	
Two-party-preferred result
Labor	Martin Foley	19,370	53.0	+2.1
Liberal	Shannon Eeles	17,206	47.0	−2.1
Labor hold		Swing	+2.1	

2010 Victorian state election: Albert Park
Party	Candidate	Votes	%	±%
Liberal	Mark Lopez	15,234	38.29	+3.65
Labor	Martin Foley	12,012	30.19	−10.86
Greens	Ann Birrell	7,218	18.14	−0.93
Independent	Serge Thomann	3,619	9.10	+9.10
Sex Party	Katie Blakey	1,404	3.53	+3.53
Family First	Josie Young	303	0.76	−0.32
Total formal votes		39,790	96.21	+0.54
Informal votes		1,568	3.79	−0.54
Turnout		41,358	87.72	+2.00
Two-party-preferred result
Labor	Martin Foley	20,713	52.06	−7.63
Liberal	Mark Lopez	19,077	47.94	+7.63
Labor hold		Swing	−7.63	

=== Elections in the 2000s ===
2007 Albert Park state by-election
Party	Candidate	Votes	%	±%
Labor	Martin Foley	13,687	46.83	+5.78
Greens	John Middleton	8,448	28.53	+9.46
Independent	Nigel Strauss	1,702	5.75	+5.75
Democrats	Paul Kavanagh	1,702	5.75	+5.75
Independent	Prodos Marinakis	1,422	4.80	+4.80
Family First	Cameron Eastman	1,306	4.41	+3.33
Democratic Labor	Shane McCarthy	512	1.73	+1.73
Independent	Adrian Jackson	354	1.20	−0.07
Independent	John Dobinson	297	1.00	+1.00
Total formal votes		29,637	92.53	−3.14
Informal votes		2,392	7.47	+3.14
Turnout		32,029	70.67	−15.05
Two-candidate-preferred result
Labor	Martin Foley	17,000	57.07	N/A
Greens	John Middleton	12,788	42.93	N/A
Labor hold		Swing	N/A	

2006 Victorian state election: Albert Park
Party	Candidate	Votes	%	±%
Labor	John Thwaites	14,787	41.05	−7.11
Liberal	Clive Smith	12,479	34.64	+1.83
Greens	John Middleton	6,871	19.07	+1.75
People Power	Stratos Pavlis	771	2.14	+2.14
Independent	Adrian Jackson	458	1.27	+1.27
Family First	Sam Robertson	390	1.08	+1.08
Citizens Electoral Council	David Reece	269	0.75	+0.75
Total formal votes		36,025	95.67	−1.62
Informal votes		1,630	4.33	+1.62
Turnout		37,655	85.72	−2.75
Two-party-preferred result
Labor	John Thwaites	21,145	59.22	−3.28
Liberal	Clive Smith	14,560	40.78	+3.28
Labor hold		Swing	−3.28	

2002 Victorian state election: Albert Park
Party	Candidate	Votes	%	±%
Labor	John Thwaites	16,053	48.16	−8.26
Liberal	Virginia Browne	10,936	32.81	−10.77
Greens	John Middleton	5,774	17.32	+17.32
Independent	Melanie Oke	571	1.71	+1.71
Total formal votes		33,334	97.29	+0.14
Informal votes		928	2.71	−0.14
Turnout		34,262	88.47	+0.43
Two-party-preferred result
Labor	John Thwaites	20,835	62.50	+6.08
Liberal	Virginia Browne	12,499	37.50	−6.08
Labor hold		Swing	+6.08	

=== Elections in the 1990s ===
1999 Victorian state election: Albert Park
Party	Candidate	Votes	%	±%
Labor	John Thwaites	18,997	56.4	−2.4
Liberal	Rob Rushford	14,671	43.6	+2.4
Total formal votes		33,668	97.1	−0.7
Informal votes		989	2.9	+0.7
Turnout		34,657	88.0	
Labor hold		Swing	−2.4	

1996 Victorian state election: Albert Park
Party	Candidate	Votes	%	±%
Labor	John Thwaites	18,789	57.1	+10.7
Liberal	Eacham Curry	12,999	39.5	+0.1
Natural Law	Heath Allison	1,135	3.4	+1.4
Total formal votes		32,923	97.8	+2.0
Informal votes		741	2.2	−2.0
Turnout		33,664	89.8	
Two-party-preferred result
Labor	John Thwaites	19,328	58.8	+3.0
Liberal	Eacham Curry	13,554	41.2	−3.0
Labor hold		Swing	+3.0	

1992 Victorian state election: Albert Park
Party	Candidate	Votes	%	±%
Labor	John Thwaites	13,764	46.3	−6.5
Liberal	Wendy Smith	11,702	39.4	+6.9
Independent	Shane Tonks	1,505	5.1	+5.1
Independent	Anne Fahey	1,358	4.6	−4.4
Independent	Jill Rothwell	772	2.6	+2.6
Natural Law	Caroline Hockley	602	2.0	+2.0
Total formal votes		29,703	95.8	+0.4
Informal votes		1,293	4.2	−0.4
Turnout		30,996	91.7	
Two-party-preferred result
Labor	John Thwaites	16,539	55.8	−4.6
Liberal	Wendy Smith	13,098	44.2	+4.6
Labor hold		Swing	−4.6	

=== Elections in the 1980s ===
1988 Victorian state election: Albert Park
Party	Candidate	Votes	%	±%
Labor	Bunna Walsh	11,939	51.15	−11.04
Liberal	Andrew Lindsay	7,542	32.31	−5.50
Independent	Anne Fahey	2,785	11.93	+11.93
Independent	Kathleen Brown	1,076	4.61	+4.61
Total formal votes		23,342	95.66	−1.07
Informal votes		1,060	4.34	+1.07
Turnout		24,402	85.47	−2.69
Two-party-preferred result
Labor	Bunna Walsh	13,733	58.88	−3.31
Liberal	Andrew Lindsay	9,589	41.12	+3.31
Labor hold		Swing	−3.31	

1985 Victorian state election: Albert Park
Party	Candidate	Votes	%	±%
Labor	Bunna Walsh	15,816	62.2	+0.6
Liberal	Barry Semmens	9,616	37.8	+5.8
Total formal votes		25,432	96.7	
Informal votes		860	3.3	
Turnout		26,292	88.2	
Labor hold		Swing	−3.5	

1982 Victorian state election: Albert Park
Party	Candidate	Votes	%	±%
Labor	Bunna Walsh	15,104	62.6	+2.9
Liberal	Reginald Macey	7,476	31.0	+0.3
Democrats	Ian Dawes	1,546	6.4	−3.2
Total formal votes		24,126	96.8	+0.4
Informal votes		786	3.2	−0.4
Turnout		24,912	89.9	+1.5
Two-party-preferred result
Labor	Bunna Walsh	15,993	66.3	+2.3
Liberal	Reginald Macey	8,133	33.7	−2.3
Labor hold		Swing	+2.3	

=== Elections in the 1970s ===
1979 Victorian state election: Albert Park
Party	Candidate	Votes	%	±%
Labor	Bunna Walsh	14,212	59.7	−3.4
Liberal	Donald Gillies	7,302	30.7	−6.2
Democrats	Marilyn Blair	2,278	9.6	+9.6
Total formal votes		23,792	96.4	+0.3
Informal votes		879	3.6	−0.3
Turnout		24,671	88.4	+2.7
Two-party-preferred result
Labor	Bunna Walsh	15,237	64.0	+0.9
Liberal	Donald Gillies	8,555	36.0	−0.9
Labor hold		Swing	+0.9	

1976 Victorian state election: Albert Park
Party	Candidate	Votes	%	±%
Labor	Val Doube	16,518	63.1	+3.4
Liberal	Timothy Hinchcliffe	9,644	36.9	+4.1
Total formal votes		26,162	96.1	
Informal votes		970	3.9	
Turnout		27,132	85.7	
Labor hold		Swing	+2.5	

1973 Victorian state election: Albert Park
Party	Candidate	Votes	%	±%
Labor	Val Doube	12,920	65.2	+7.4
Liberal	Norman Walker	5,290	26.7	−2.1
Democratic Labor	Monica McGeoch	1,620	8.2	−5.2
Total formal votes		19,830	96.0	+0.6
Informal votes		827	4.0	−0.6
Turnout		20,657	91.2	−1.2
Two-party-preferred result
Labor	Val Doube	13,163	66.4	+6.6
Liberal	Norman Walker	6,667	33.6	−6.6
Labor hold		Swing	+6.6	

1970 Victorian state election: Albert Park
Party	Candidate	Votes	%	±%
Labor	Val Doube	11,583	57.8	−2.1
Liberal	Wallace Cameron	5,768	28.8	+5.9
Democratic Labor	Monica McGeoch	2,692	13.4	−3.8
Total formal votes		20,043	95.4	+0.1
Informal votes		960	4.6	−0.1
Turnout		21,003	92.4	+0.2
Two-party-preferred result
Labor	Val Doube	11,987	59.8	−2.7
Liberal	Wallace Cameron	8,056	40.2	+2.7
Labor hold		Swing	−2.7	

=== Elections in the 1960s ===
1967 Victorian state election: Albert Park
Party	Candidate	Votes	%	±%
Labor	Keith Sutton	12,662	59.9	−1.4
Liberal	Constantine Kondos	4,849	22.9	+1.0
Democratic Labor	Victor Coppens	3,631	17.2	−0.4
Total formal votes		21,142	95.3	
Informal votes		1,053	4.7	
Turnout		22,195	92.2	
Two-party-preferred result
Labor	Keith Sutton	13,206	62.5	−1.3
Liberal	Constantine Kondos	7,936	37.5	+1.3
Labor hold		Swing	−1.3	

1964 Victorian state election: Albert Park
Party	Candidate	Votes	%	±%
Labor	Keith Sutton	8,184	56.8	+0.7
Liberal and Country	Geoffrey Ryan	3,256	22.6	+0.8
Democratic Labor	Albert Jones	2,963	20.6	−1.5
Total formal votes		14,403	96.6	
Informal votes		506	3.4	
Turnout		14,909	91.9	
Two-party-preferred result
Labor	Keith Sutton	8,678	59.9	+0.5
Liberal and Country	Geoffrey Ryan	5,725	40.1	−0.5
Labor hold		Swing	+0.5	

1961 Victorian state election: Albert Park
Party	Candidate	Votes	%	±%
Labor	Keith Sutton	8,736	56.1	+7.2
Democratic Labor	Albert Jones	3,437	22.1	−1.7
Liberal and Country	Thomas Merrett	3,404	21.8	−2.9
Total formal votes		15,577	96.6	−0.8
Informal votes		554	3.4	+0.8
Turnout		16,131	92.6	+0.3
Two-party-preferred result
Labor	Keith Sutton	9,252	59.4	+5.0
Liberal and Country	Thomas Merrett	6,325	40.6	−5.0
Labor hold		Swing	+5.0	

- The two candidate preferred vote was not counted between the Labor and DLP candidates for Albert Park.

=== Elections in the 1950s ===
1958 Victorian state election: Albert Park
Party	Candidate	Votes	%	±%
Labor	Keith Sutton	8,727	48.9	
Liberal and Country	Reginald Schilling	4,411	24.7	
Democratic Labor	Stan Corrigan	4,250	23.8	
Communist	Vida Little	442	2.5	
Total formal votes		17,830	97.4	
Informal votes		480	2.6	
Turnout		18,310	92.3	
Two-party-preferred result
Labor	Keith Sutton	9,703	54.4	
Liberal and Country	Reginald Schilling	8,127	45.6	
Labor hold		Swing		

1955 Victorian state election: Albert Park
Party	Candidate	Votes	%	±%
Labor	Keith Sutton	7,379	47.6	
Liberal and Country	Thomas Merrett	4,542	29.3	
Labor (A-C)	Albert Jones	3,569	23.1	
Total formal votes		15,490	97.7	
Informal votes		363	2.3	
Turnout		15,853	91.1	
Two-party-preferred result
Labor	Keith Sutton	7,867	50.8	
Liberal and Country	Thomas Merrett	7,623	49.2	
Labor hold		Swing		

1952 Victorian state election: Albert Park
Party	Candidate	Votes	%	±%
Labor	Keith Sutton	12,985	65.7	+14.4
Liberal and Country	Desmond Byrne	6,770	34.3	−14.4
Total formal votes		19,755	97.9	−2.0
Informal votes		417	2.1	+2.0
Turnout		20,172	90.5	−0.2
Labor hold		Swing	+14.4	

1950 Victorian state election: Albert Park
Party	Candidate	Votes	%	±%
Labor	Keith Sutton	11,807	51.3	+2.5
Liberal and Country	Roy Schilling	11,230	48.7	−2.5
Total formal votes		23,037	99.1	−0.1
Informal votes		199	0.9	+0.1
Turnout		23,244	90.7	+1.1
Labor gain from Liberal and Country		Swing	+2.5	

=== Elections in the 1940s ===
1947 Victorian state election: Albert Park
Party	Candidate	Votes	%	±%
Liberal	Roy Schilling	12,245	51.2	+33.6
Labor	Frank Crean	11,664	48.8	+13.9
Total formal votes		23,909	99.2	+3.1
Informal votes		199	0.8	−3.1
Turnout		24,108	89.6	+4.8
Liberal gain from Labor		Swing	N/A	

1945 Victorian state election: Albert Park
Party	Candidate	Votes	%	±%
Labor	Frank Crean	7,227	34.9	
Ministerial Liberal	William Haworth	6,333	30.6	
Liberal	John Rasmussen	3,638	17.6	
Independent Socialist	James Coull	3,514	17.0	
Total formal votes		20,712	96.1	
Informal votes		842	3.9	
Turnout		21,554	84.8	
After distribution of preferences
Labor	Frank Crean	10,390	50.2	
Ministerial Liberal	William Haworth	6,574	31.7	
Liberal	John Rasmussen	3,748	18.1	
Labor gain from Liberal		Swing		

- Preferences were not distributed to completion.

1943 Victorian state election: Albert Park
Party	Candidate	Votes	%	±%
United Australia	William Haworth	13,452	57.1	+5.5
Independent Socialist	James Coull	10,105	42.9	+42.9
Total formal votes		23,557	96.6	−1.4
Informal votes		830	3.4	+1.4
Turnout		24,387	84.4	−8.5
United Australia hold		Swing	N/A	

1940 Victorian state election: Albert Park
Party	Candidate	Votes	%	±%
United Australia	William Haworth	11,427	51.6	+18.9
Labor	David Casey	10,707	48.4	+8.3
Total formal votes		22,134	98.0	+1.7
Informal votes		453	2.0	−1.7
Turnout		22,587	92.9	−1.3
United Australia hold		Swing	−1.7	

=== Elections in the 1930s ===
1937 Victorian state election: Albert Park
Party	Candidate	Votes	%	±%
Labor	John Chapple	8,755	40.1	−0.5
United Australia	William Haworth	7,151	32.7	−20.7
Ind. United Australia	Harry Drew	4,117	18.8	+18.8
Independent	Leah Kloot	1,834	8.4	+8.4
Total formal votes		21,857	96.3	−1.1
Informal votes		838	3.7	+1.1
Turnout		22,695	94.2	+1.1
Two-party-preferred result
United Australia	William Haworth	11,641	53.3	−2.6
Labor	John Chapple	10,216	46.7	+2.6
United Australia hold		Swing	−2.6	

1935 Victorian state election: Albert Park
Party	Candidate	Votes	%	±%
United Australia	Harry Drew	11,167	53.4	−10.6
Labor	John Chapple	8,500	40.6	+4.6
Independent	George Brown	1,247	6.0	+6.0
Total formal votes		20,914	97.4	−0.9
Informal votes		564	2.6	+0.9
Turnout		21,478	93.1	+2.0
Two-party-preferred result
United Australia	Harry Drew		55.9	−8.1
Labor	John Chapple		44.1	+8.1
United Australia hold		Swing	−8.1	

- Two party preferred vote was estimated.

1932 Victorian state election: Albert Park
Party	Candidate	Votes	%	±%
United Australia	Harry Drew	12,850	64.0	+17.1
Labor	Joseph Hannan	7,215	36.0	−17.1
Total formal votes		20,065	98.3	−0.7
Informal votes		358	1.7	+0.7
Turnout		20,423	91.1	−0.5
United Australia gain from Labor		Swing	+17.1	

=== Elections in the 1920s ===
1929 Victorian state election: Albert Park
Party	Candidate	Votes	%	±%
Labor	Arthur Wallace	10,994	53.1	+6.6
Nationalist	Robert Cuthbertson	9,704	46.9	+12.8
Total formal votes		20,698	99.0	+1.5
Informal votes		203	1.0	−1.5
Turnout		20,901	91.6	+2.3
Labor gain from Nationalist		Swing	+3.2	

1927 Victorian state election: Albert Park
Party	Candidate	Votes	%	±%
Labor	Arthur Wallace	9,581	46.5	
Nationalist	Robert Cuthbertson	7,044	34.1	
Australian Liberal	Charles Merrett	4,002	19.4	
Total formal votes		20,627	97.5	
Informal votes		541	2.5	
Turnout		21,168	89.3	
Two-party-preferred result
Nationalist	Robert Cuthbertson	10,338	50.1	
Labor	Arthur Wallace	10,289	49.9	
Nationalist gain from Labor		Swing		

1924 Victorian state election: Albert Park
Party	Candidate	Votes	%	±%
Labor	Arthur Wallace	7,262	61.6	+8.3
Nationalist	John Atkinson	2,550	21.6	−25.1
Independent Liberal	Selwyn Neale	1,748	14.8	+14.8
Independent Liberal	Thomas Craine	2,550	1.9	+1.9
Total formal votes		11,788	97.6	−2.1
Informal votes		286	2.4	+2.1
Turnout		12,074	59.1	+5.8
Two-party-preferred result
Labor	Arthur Wallace		63.3	+10.0
Nationalist	John Atkinson		36.7	−10.0
Labor hold		Swing	+10.0	

- Two party preferred vote was estimated.

1921 Victorian state election: Albert Park
Party	Candidate	Votes	%	±%
Labor	Arthur Wallace	5,882	53.3	−3.2
Nationalist	William Hug	5,164	46.7	+46.7
Total formal votes		11,046	99.7	+0.8
Informal votes		30	0.3	−0.8
Turnout		11,076	53.3	−8.2
Labor hold		Swing	N/A	

1920 Victorian state election: Albert Park
Party	Candidate	Votes	%	±%
Labor	Arthur Wallace	7,396	56.5	−0.8
Independent	James Morris	5,705	43.5	+43.5
Total formal votes		13,101	98.9	+2.7
Informal votes		145	1.1	−2.7
Turnout		13,246	61.5	+2.3
Labor hold		Swing	N/A	

=== Elections in the 1910s ===
1919 Albert Park state by-election
Party	Candidate	Votes	%	±%
Labor	Arthur Wallace	4,803	54.1	−3.2
Nationalist	William Cull	4,070	45.9	+3.2
Total formal votes		8,873	98.9	+2.7
Informal votes		103	1.1	−2.7
Turnout		8,976	41.1	−18.1
Labor hold		Swing	−3.2	

1918 Albert Park state by-election
Party	Candidate	Votes	%	±%
Labor	Joseph Hannan	5,995	52.6	−4.7
Nationalist	Robert Cuthbertson	4,154	36.5	−6.2
Independent	Charles Pickett	1,248	10.9	+10.9
Total formal votes		11,397	97.0	+0.8
Informal votes		352	3.0	−0.8
Turnout		11,749	53.9	−5.3
Labor hold		Swing	N/A	

- Preferences were not distributed.

1917 Victorian state election: Albert Park
Party	Candidate	Votes	%	±%
Labor	George Elmslie	6,039	57.3	
Nationalist	John Baragwanath	4,499	42.7	
Total formal votes		10,538	96.2	
Informal votes		412	3.8	
Turnout		10,950	59.2	
Labor hold		Swing	N/A	

1914 Victorian state election: Albert Park
Party	Candidate	Votes	%	±%
Labor	George Elmslie	unopposed		
Labor hold		Swing		

1911 Victorian state election: Albert Park
Party	Candidate	Votes	%	±%
Labor	George Elmslie	5,865	59.2	−2.8
Liberal	Ernest Joske	3,910	39.5	+1.5
Independent	William Gaunson	125	1.3	+1.3
Total formal votes		9,900	98.1	−1.2
Informal votes		194	1.9	+1.2
Turnout		10,094	56.0	+2.8
Two-party-preferred result
Labor	George Elmslie		59.8	−2.2
Liberal	Ernest Joske		40.2	+2.2
Labor hold		Swing	−2.2	

- Two party preferred votes were estimated.
