= Electoral results for the district of St Kilda =

Australian district election results

This is a list of electoral results for the electoral district of St Kilda in Victorian state elections.

== Members for St Kilda ==
Two members initially, one after the redistribution of 1889.

Member 1	Party	Term	Member 2	Party	Term
Thomas Fellows	Unaligned	1856–1858	Frederick James Sargood	Unaligned	1856–1857
John Crews	Unaligned	1858–1859	Henry Chapman	Unaligned	1858–1859
Sir Archibald Michie	Unaligned	1859–1861	James Johnston	Unaligned	1859–1864
Kenric Brodribb	Unaligned	1861–1864	James Johnston	Unaligned	1859–1864
Sir Archibald Michie	Unaligned	1864–1865	John Crews	Unliagned	1864–1865
Joshua Snowball	Unaligned	1866–1867	Brice Bunny	Unaligned	1866–1867
Thomas Fellows	Unaligned	1868–1872	Cole Aspinall	Unaligned	1868–1870
Murray Smith	Unaligned	1873–1877	James Stephen	Unaligned	1870–1874
Godfrey Carter	Unaligned	1877–1883	Edward Dixon	Unaligned	1874–1880
Sir Matthew Davies	Unaligned	1883–1889	Joseph Harris	Unaligned	1880–1889
Sir George Turner	Unaligned	1889–1901			
William Williams	Liberal	1901–1902			
Robert McCutcheon	Ministerialist/ Independent Liberal	1902–1917			
Agar Wynne	Unaligned	1917–1920			
Frederic Eggleston	Nationalist	1920–1927			
Burnett Gray	Liberal	1927–1932			
Sir Archie Michaelis	United Australia Party/ Liberal Party	1932–1952			
John Bourke	Labor Party	1952–1955			
Baron Snider	Liberal Party	1955–1964			
Brian Dixon	Liberal Party	1964–1982			
Andrew McCutcheon	Labor Party	1982–1992			

== Election results ==
=== Elections in the 1980s ===
1988 Victorian state election: St Kilda
Party	Candidate	Votes	%	±%
Labor	Andrew McCutcheon	11,652	49.83	−2.82
Liberal	John Callanan	9,988	42.72	−4.63
Democrats	Geoffrey Brooks	1,742	7.45	+7.45
Total formal votes		23,382	95.33	−1.12
Informal votes		1,146	4.67	+1.12
Turnout		24,528	87.10	−1.81
Two-party-preferred result
Labor	Andrew McCutcheon	12,993	55.57	+2.92
Liberal	John Callanan	10,389	44.43	−2.92
Labor hold		Swing	+2.92	

1985 Victorian state election: St Kilda
Party	Candidate	Votes	%	±%
Labor	Andrew McCutcheon	13,918	52.7	+3.6
Liberal	Richard Stevenson	12,518	47.3	+4.4
Total formal votes		26,436	96.4	
Informal votes		973	3.6	
Turnout		27,409	88.9	
Labor hold		Swing	+0.2	

1982 Victorian state election: St Kilda
Party	Candidate	Votes	%	±%
Labor	Andrew McCutcheon	11,701	50.9	+6.6
Liberal	Brian Dixon	9,406	40.9	−4.0
Democrats	Susanne McDougall	1,022	4.5	−1.4
Democratic Labor	Daniel Condon	703	3.1	−1.9
Australia	Joseph Johnson	143	0.6	+0.6
Total formal votes		22,975	95.9	+0.5
Informal votes		993	4.1	−0.5
Turnout		23,968	90.1	+2.6
Two-party-preferred result
Labor	Andrew McCutcheon	12,431	54.1	+4.3
Liberal	Brian Dixon	10,544	45.9	−4.3
Labor gain from Liberal		Swing	+4.3	

=== Elections in the 1970s ===
1979 Victorian state election: St Kilda
Party	Candidate	Votes	%	±%
Liberal	Brian Dixon	10,112	44.9	−7.7
Labor	David Hardy	9,977	44.3	+5.2
Democrats	Douglas Davidson	1,327	5.9	+5.9
Democratic Labor	John Cotter	1,125	5.0	+5.0
Total formal votes		22,541	95.4	−1.2
Informal votes		1,088	4.6	+1.2
Turnout		23,629	87.5	+1.3
Two-party-preferred result
Liberal	Brian Dixon	11,312	50.2	−5.9
Labor	David Hardy	11,229	49.8	+5.9
Liberal hold		Swing	−5.9	

1976 Victorian state election: St Kilda
Party	Candidate	Votes	%	±%
Liberal	Brian Dixon	13,430	52.6	+6.2
Labor	David Hardy	9,969	39.1	−5.0
Independent	Peter Lake	1,042	4.1	+4.1
Independent	Ronald Petersen	853	3.3	+3.3
Independent	Frederick Gray	217	0.9	+0.9
Total formal votes		25,511	96.6	
Informal votes		908	3.4	
Turnout		26,419	86.2	
Two-party-preferred result
Liberal	Brian Dixon	14,304	56.1	+2.7
Labor	David Hardy	11,207	43.9	−2.7
Liberal hold		Swing	+2.7	

1973 Victorian state election: St Kilda
Party	Candidate	Votes	%	±%
Liberal	Brian Dixon	11,974	50.4	+4.4
Labor	Robin Beaumont	9,627	40.5	+0.2
Democratic Labor	John Hughes	1,220	5.1	−4.4
Australia	Beverley Broadbent	957	4.0	+4.0
Total formal votes		23,778	96.1	+1.1
Informal votes		975	3.9	−1.1
Turnout		24,753	89.6	−2.0
Two-party-preferred result
Liberal	Brian Dixon	13,394	56.3	+0.4
Labor	Robin Beaumont	10,384	43.7	−0.4
Liberal hold		Swing	+0.4	

1970 Victorian state election: St Kilda
Party	Candidate	Votes	%	±%
Liberal	Brian Dixon	10,318	46.0	−5.5
Labor	David Bottomley	9,031	40.3	+4.3
Democratic Labor	John Hughes	2,123	9.5	−2.9
Defence of Government Schools	Lancelot Hutchinson	775	3.5	+3.5
Independent	Neville Penton	180	0.8	+0.8
Total formal votes		22,427	95.0	−0.9
Informal votes		1,177	5.0	+0.9
Turnout		23,604	91.6	+2.2
Two-party-preferred result
Liberal	Brian Dixon	12,541	55.9	−6.2
Labor	David Bottomley	9,886	44.1	+6.2
Liberal hold		Swing	−6.2	

=== Elections in the 1960s ===
1967 Victorian state election: St Kilda
Party	Candidate	Votes	%	±%
Liberal	Brian Dixon	11,906	51.5	+2.2
Labor	Brian Zouch	8,326	36.0	−1.8
Democratic Labor	John Hughes	2,870	12.4	−0.5
Total formal votes		23,102	95.9	
Informal votes		975	4.1	
Turnout		24,077	89.4	
Two-party-preferred result
Liberal	Brian Dixon	14,346	62.1	+1.8
Labor	Brian Zouch	8,756	37.9	−1.8
Liberal hold		Swing	+1.8	

1964 Victorian state election: St Kilda
Party	Candidate	Votes	%	±%
Liberal and Country	Brian Dixon	7,916	48.1	+1.6
Labor	Juliet Dahlitz	6,676	40.5	+1.5
Democratic Labor	John Hughes	1,883	11.4	−3.1
Total formal votes		16,475	96.6	−0.1
Informal votes		571	3.4	+0.1
Turnout		17,046	91.8	+1.5
Two-party-preferred result
Liberal and Country	Brian Dixon	9,626	58.4	0.0
Labor	Juliet Dahlitz	6,849	41.6	0.0
Liberal and Country hold		Swing	0.0	

1961 Victorian state election: St Kilda
Party	Candidate	Votes	%	±%
Liberal and Country	Baron Snider	7,537	46.5	−0.4
Labor	Leslie Atherton	6,329	39.0	−0.1
Democratic Labor	John Hughes	2,348	14.5	+0.5
Total formal votes		16,214	96.7	−0.4
Informal votes		557	3.3	+0.4
Turnout		16,771	90.3	−0.1
Two-party-preferred result
Liberal and Country	Baron Snider	9,466	58.4	+0.6
Labor	Leslie Atherton	6,748	41.6	−0.6
Liberal and Country hold		Swing	+0.6	

=== Elections in the 1950s ===
1958 Victorian state election: St Kilda
Party	Candidate	Votes	%	±%
Liberal and Country	Baron Snider	8,312	46.9	
Labor	Paul Fraser	6,923	39.1	
Democratic Labor	John Hughes	2,484	14.0	
Total formal votes		17,719	97.1	
Informal votes		535	2.9	
Turnout		18,254	90.4	
Two-party-preferred result
Liberal and Country	Baron Snider	10,237	57.8	
Labor	Paul Fraser	7,482	42.2	
Liberal and Country hold		Swing		

1955 Victorian state election: St Kilda
Party	Candidate	Votes	%	±%
Liberal and Country	Baron Snider	7,238	44.1	
Labor	John Bourke	6,967	42.4	
Victorian Liberal	Arnold Blashki	1,755	10.7	
Independent	Maxwell Fisher	454	2.8	
Total formal votes		16,414	96.5	
Informal votes		589	3.5	
Turnout		17,003	91.8	
Two-party-preferred result
Liberal and Country	Baron Snider	8,768	53.4	
Labor	John Bourke	7,646	46.6	
Liberal and Country gain from Labor		Swing		

1952 Victorian state election: St Kilda
Party	Candidate	Votes	%	±%
Labor	John Bourke	10,724	54.5	+6.8
Liberal and Country	Archie Michaelis	5,594	28.4	−23.9
Electoral Reform	Geoffrey Kiddle	3,378	17.1	+17.1
Total formal votes		19,696	97.7	−1.4
Informal votes		469	2.3	+1.4
Turnout		20,165	93.6	+0.3
Two-party-preferred result
Labor	John Bourke	11,062	56.2	+8.5
Liberal and Country	Archie Michaelis	8,634	43.8	−8.5
Labor gain from Liberal and Country		Swing	+8.5	

1950 Victorian state election: St Kilda
Party	Candidate	Votes	%	±%
Liberal and Country	Archie Michaelis	11,477	52.3	+52.3
Labor	John Bourke	10,464	47.7	+5.8
Total formal votes		21,941	99.1	+0.3
Informal votes		192	0.9	−0.3
Turnout		22,133	93.3	+2.1
Liberal and Country gain from Independent		Swing	N/A	

=== Elections in the 1940s ===
1947 Victorian state election: St Kilda
Party	Candidate	Votes	%	±%
Independent Liberal	Archie Michaelis	13,527	58.1	+28.2
Labor	Bill Bourke	9,748	41.9	−2.9
Total formal votes		23,275	98.8	+1.3
Informal votes		277	1.2	−1.3
Turnout		23,552	91.2	+5.2
Independent Liberal hold		Swing	+7.6	

1945 Victorian state election: St Kilda
Party	Candidate	Votes	%	±%
Labor	George Dethbridge	9,326	44.8	
Ministerial Liberal	Archie Michaelis	6,229	29.9	
Liberal	Leslie Lord	5,284	25.3	
Total formal votes		20,839	97.5	
Informal votes		534	2.5	
Turnout		21,373	86.0	
Two-party-preferred result
Ministerial Liberal	Archie Michaelis	10,532	50.5	
Labor	George Dethbridge	10,307	49.5	
Ministerial Liberal gain from Liberal		Swing		

1943 Victorian state election: St Kilda
Party	Candidate	Votes	%	±%
United Australia	Archie Michaelis	15,135	53.9	+0.6
Labor	Marjorie Bennett	10,503	37.4	+37.4
Independent	Ethel Pace	2,428	8.7	+8.7
Total formal votes		28,066	96.6	−1.6
Informal votes		987	3.4	+1.6
Turnout		29,053	86.4	−5.6
United Australia hold		Swing	N/A	

- Preferences were not distributed.

1940 Victorian state election: St Kilda
Party	Candidate	Votes	%	±%
United Australia	Archie Michaelis	14,885	53.3	−13.4
Independent	Francis Dawkins	13,060	46.7	+46.7
Total formal votes		27,945	98.2	0.0
Informal votes		504	1.8	0.0
Turnout		28,449	92.0	−0.5
United Australia hold		Swing	N/A	

=== Elections in the 1930s ===
1937 Victorian state election: St Kilda
Party	Candidate	Votes	%	±%
United Australia	Archie Michaelis	17,559	66.7	+12.1
Labor	Marks Feinberg	8,783	33.3	+33.3
Total formal votes		26,342	98.2	+0.3
Informal votes		476	1.8	−0.3
Turnout		26,818	92.5	−3.8
United Australia hold		Swing	N/A	

1935 Victorian state election: St Kilda
Party	Candidate	Votes	%	±%
United Australia	Archie Michaelis	13,582	54.6	−1.3
Independent	Cyril Nelson	11,317	45.4	+45.4
Total formal votes		24,899	97.9	−1.1
Informal votes		546	2.1	+1.1
Turnout		25,445	96.3	+1.5
United Australia hold		Swing	−1.3	

1932 Victorian state election: St Kilda
Party	Candidate	Votes	%	±%
United Australia	Archie Michaelis	13,662	55.9	+10.5
Ind. United Australia	Burnett Gray	10,780	44.1	−10.5
Total formal votes		24,442	99.0	−0.2
Informal votes		237	1.0	+0.2
Turnout		24,679	94.8	+1.2
United Australia gain from Ind. United Australia		Swing	+10.5	

=== Elections in the 1920s ===
1929 Victorian state election: St Kilda
Party	Candidate	Votes	%	±%
Australian Liberal	Burnett Gray	13,253	54.6	+4.2
Nationalist	Robert Morley	11,035	45.4	+16.4
Total formal votes		24,288	99.2	+2.1
Informal votes		207	0.8	−2.1
Turnout		24,495	93.6	+1.7
Australian Liberal hold		Swing	N/A	

1927 Victorian state election: St Kilda
Party	Candidate	Votes	%	±%
Australian Liberal	Burnett Gray	11,227	50.4	
Nationalist	Frederic Eggleston	6,456	29.0	
Independent	Florence Johnson	4,597	20.6	
Total formal votes		22,280	97.1	
Informal votes		660	2.9	
Turnout		22,940	91.9	
Australian Liberal gain from Nationalist		Swing		

- Preferences were not distributed.

1924 Victorian state election: St Kilda
Party	Candidate	Votes	%	±%
Nationalist	Frederic Eggleston	unopposed		
Nationalist hold		Swing		

1921 Victorian state election: St Kilda
Party	Candidate	Votes	%	±%
Nationalist	Frederic Eggleston	10,104	74.8	+49.1
Labor	Walter Gorman	3,399	25.2	+3.5
Total formal votes		13,503	99.6	+6.5
Informal votes		55	0.4	−6.5
Turnout		13,558	39.8	−15.1
Nationalist hold		Swing	N/A	

1920 Victorian state election: St Kilda
Party	Candidate	Votes	%	±%
Nationalist	Frederic Eggleston	4,472	25.7	
Labor	Walter Gorman	3,782	21.7	−2.5
Nationalist	Alban Morley	3,317	19.0	
Nationalist	Henry Barnet	2,859	16.4	
Nationalist	Albert Sculthorpe	1,621	9.3	
Nationalist	Anthony O'Dwyer	1,371	7.9	
Total formal votes		17,422	93.1	−3.6
Informal votes		1,300	6.9	+3.6
Turnout		18,722	54.9	+6.7
Two-candidate-preferred result
Nationalist	Frederic Eggleston	11,065	63.5	
Nationalist	Alban Morley	6,357	36.5	
Nationalist hold		Swing	N/A	

=== Elections in the 1910s ===
1917 Victorian state election: St Kilda
Party	Candidate	Votes	%	±%
Nationalist	Agar Wynne	5,309	38.0	
Nationalist	John Macfarlan	5,279	37.8	
Labor	George McGowan	3,374	24.2	−11.3
Total formal votes		13,962	96.7	−1.7
Informal votes		470	3.3	+1.7
Turnout		14,432	48.2	+11.0
Two-candidate-preferred result
Nationalist	Agar Wynne	7,126	51.0	
Nationalist	John Macfarlan	6,836	49.0	
Nationalist hold		Swing	N/A	

1914 Victorian state election: St Kilda
Party	Candidate	Votes	%	±%
Liberal	Robert McCutcheon	5,975	64.5	−1.2
Labor	Robert Smart	3,287	35.5	+1.2
Total formal votes		9,262	98.4	+0.3
Informal votes		151	1.6	−0.3
Turnout		9,413	37.2	−13.2
Liberal hold		Swing	−1.2	

1911 Victorian state election: St Kilda
Party	Candidate	Votes	%	±%
Liberal	Robert McCutcheon	6,288	65.7	+3.6
Labor	George Mead	3,285	34.3	+34.3
Total formal votes		9,573	98.1	−1.0
Informal votes		183	1.9	+1.0
Turnout		9,756	50.4	+13.5
Liberal hold		Swing	N/A	
