= Electoral results for the district of Mentone =

Victoria, Australia, district election results

This is a list of electoral results for the electoral district of Mentone in Victorian state elections.

== Members for Mentone ==
| Member | Party | Term |
|---|---|---|
| George White | Labor | 1945 – 1947 |
| Harry Drew | Liberal | 1947 – 1949 |
| Harry Drew | Liberal and Country | 1949 – 1950 |
| George White | Labor | 1950 – 1955 |
| George White | Labor (Anti-Communist) | 1955 |
| Edward Meagher | Liberal and Country | 1955 – 1965 |
| Edward Meagher | Liberal | 1965 – 1967 |
| Bill Templeton | Liberal | 1967 – 1985 |
| Peter Spyker | Labor | 1985 – 1992 |

== Election results ==
=== Elections in the 1980s ===
1988 Victorian state election: Mentone
| Party | Candidate | Votes | % | ±% |
|---|---|---|---|---|
| Labor | Peter Spyker | 12,971 | 48.58 | −3.39 |
| Liberal | Maxwell Read | 11,976 | 44.85 | −3.18 |
| Democrats | Sarah Austin | 1,240 | 4.64 | +4.64 |
| Independent | John Murray | 515 | 1.93 | +1.93 |
| Total formal votes | | 26,702 | 97.00 | −0.43 |
| Informal votes | | 825 | 3.00 | +0.43 |
| Turnout | | 27,527 | 93.02 | −0.66 |
Two-party-preferred result
| Labor | Peter Spyker | 13,989 | 52.40 | +0.43 |
| Liberal | Maxwell Read | 12,707 | 47.60 | −0.43 |
| Labor hold | | Swing | +0.43 | |

1985 Victorian state election: Mentone
| Party | Candidate | Votes | % | ±% |
|---|---|---|---|---|
| Labor | Peter Spyker | 14,406 | 52.0 | +0.1 |
| Liberal | Bill Templeton | 13,315 | 48.0 | −4.9 |
| Total formal votes | | 27,721 | 97.4 | |
| Informal votes | | 731 | 2.6 | |
| Turnout | | 28,452 | 93.7 | |
| Labor gain from Liberal | | Swing | −1.7 | |

- After the redistribution, Mentone became a notional Labor seat. Sitting Liberal member Bill Templeton did not manage to win it back.

1982 Victorian state election: Mentone
| Party | Candidate | Votes | % | ±% |
|---|---|---|---|---|
| Liberal | Bill Templeton | 13,480 | 51.2 | −0.2 |
| Labor | David Tindal | 12,855 | 48.8 | +6.2 |
| Total formal votes | | 26,335 | 97.9 | +0.1 |
| Informal votes | | 557 | 2.1 | −0.1 |
| Turnout | | 26,892 | 94.1 | +1.1 |
| Liberal hold | | Swing | −5.3 | |

=== Elections in the 1970s ===
1979 Victorian state election: Mentone
| Party | Candidate | Votes | % | ±% |
|---|---|---|---|---|
| Liberal | Bill Templeton | 13,491 | 51.4 | −4.5 |
| Labor | Barry Hirt | 11,190 | 42.6 | +4.7 |
| Democratic Labor | Desmond Burke | 1,589 | 6.0 | −0.2 |
| Total formal votes | | 26,270 | 97.8 | −0.4 |
| Informal votes | | 590 | 2.2 | +0.4 |
| Turnout | | 26,860 | 93.0 | +0.6 |
Two-party-preferred result
| Liberal | Bill Templeton | 14,851 | 56.5 | −4.4 |
| Labor | Barry Hirt | 11,419 | 43.5 | +4.4 |
| Liberal hold | | Swing | −4.4 | |

1976 Victorian state election: Mentone
| Party | Candidate | Votes | % | ±% |
|---|---|---|---|---|
| Liberal | Bill Templeton | 14,777 | 55.9 | +6.6 |
| Labor | Barry Hirt | 10,021 | 37.9 | −3.6 |
| Democratic Labor | Desmond Burke | 1,650 | 6.2 | −0.7 |
| Total formal votes | | 26,448 | 98.2 | |
| Informal votes | | 490 | 1.8 | |
| Turnout | | 26,938 | 92.4 | |
Two-party-preferred result
| Liberal | Bill Templeton | 16,097 | 60.9 | +4.8 |
| Labor | Barry Hirt | 10,351 | 39.1 | −4.8 |
| Liberal hold | | Swing | +4.8 | |

1973 Victorian state election: Mentone
| Party | Candidate | Votes | % | ±% |
|---|---|---|---|---|
| Liberal | Bill Templeton | 12,633 | 46.0 | +4.7 |
| Labor | Ian Cathie | 12,189 | 44.4 | +0.8 |
| Democratic Labor | Daniel Condon | 1,699 | 6.2 | −8.9 |
| Defence of Government Schools | Ian Black | 946 | 3.4 | +3.4 |
| Total formal votes | | 27,467 | 97.8 | +0.1 |
| Informal votes | | 621 | 2.2 | −0.1 |
| Turnout | | 28,088 | 92.7 | −1.3 |
Two-party-preferred result
| Liberal | Bill Templeton | 14,345 | 52.2 | −3.0 |
| Labor | Ian Cathie | 13,122 | 47.8 | +3.0 |
| Liberal hold | | Swing | −3.0 | |

1970 Victorian state election: Mentone
| Party | Candidate | Votes | % | ±% |
|---|---|---|---|---|
| Labor | Henry Woodley | 10,772 | 43.6 | +2.0 |
| Liberal | Bill Templeton | 10,207 | 41.3 | −0.6 |
| Democratic Labor | Kathleen Andrews | 3,730 | 15.1 | +1.2 |
| Total formal votes | | 24,709 | 97.7 | +0.4 |
| Informal votes | | 593 | 2.3 | −0.4 |
| Turnout | | 25,302 | 94.0 | −0.7 |
Two-party-preferred result
| Liberal | Bill Templeton | 13,631 | 55.2 | −0.1 |
| Labor | Henry Woodley | 11,078 | 44.8 | +0.1 |
| Liberal hold | | Swing | −0.1 | |

=== Elections in the 1960s ===
1967 Victorian state election: Mentone
| Party | Candidate | Votes | % | ±% |
|---|---|---|---|---|
| Liberal | Bill Templeton | 9,691 | 41.9 | +4.3 |
| Labor | Nola Barber | 9,612 | 41.6 | −6.5 |
| Democratic Labor | George White | 3,212 | 13.9 | −0.4 |
| Independent | Clifford Baragwanath | 612 | 2.7 | +2.7 |
| Total formal votes | | 23,127 | 97.3 | |
| Informal votes | | 635 | 2.7 | |
| Turnout | | 23,762 | 94.7 | |
Two-party-preferred result
| Liberal | Bill Templeton | 12,789 | 55.3 | +4.6 |
| Labor | Nola Barber | 10,338 | 44.7 | −4.6 |
| Liberal hold | | Swing | +4.6 | |

1964 Victorian state election: Mentone
| Party | Candidate | Votes | % | ±% |
|---|---|---|---|---|
| Labor | Harold Blair | 11,643 | 44.8 | +3.4 |
| Liberal and Country | Edward Meagher | 10,689 | 41.2 | −0.1 |
| Democratic Labor | George White | 3,635 | 14.0 | −3.3 |
| Total formal votes | | 25,967 | 98.4 | +0.3 |
| Informal votes | | 430 | 1.6 | −0.3 |
| Turnout | | 26,397 | 94.1 | −0.3 |
Two-party-preferred result
| Liberal and Country | Edward Meagher | 14,006 | 53.9 | −3.4 |
| Labor | Harold Blair | 11,961 | 46.1 | +3.4 |
| Liberal and Country hold | | Swing | −3.4 | |

1961 Victorian state election: Mentone
| Party | Candidate | Votes | % | ±% |
|---|---|---|---|---|
| Labor | Nola Barber | 10,019 | 41.4 | +1.6 |
| Liberal and Country | Edward Meagher | 10,010 | 41.3 | −2.2 |
| Democratic Labor | George White | 4,190 | 17.3 | +0.6 |
| Total formal votes | | 24,219 | 98.1 | −0.3 |
| Informal votes | | 475 | 1.9 | +0.3 |
| Turnout | | 24,694 | 94.4 | −0.5 |
Two-party-preferred result
| Liberal and Country | Edward Meagher | 13,870 | 57.3 | +0.2 |
| Labor | Nola Barber | 10,349 | 42.7 | −0.2 |
| Liberal and Country hold | | Swing | +0.2 | |

=== Elections in the 1950s ===
1958 Victorian state election: Mentone
| Party | Candidate | Votes | % | ±% |
|---|---|---|---|---|
| Liberal and Country | Edward Meagher | 9,596 | 43.5 | |
| Labor | Alfred O'Connor | 8,776 | 39.8 | |
| Democratic Labor | George White | 3,687 | 16.7 | |
| Total formal votes | | 22,059 | 98.4 | |
| Informal votes | | 364 | 1.6 | |
| Turnout | | 22,423 | 94.9 | |
Two-party-preferred result
| Liberal and Country | Edward Meagher | 12,601 | 57.1 | |
| Labor | Alfred O'Connor | 9,458 | 42.9 | |
| Liberal and Country hold | | Swing | | |

1955 Victorian state election: Mentone
| Party | Candidate | Votes | % | ±% |
|---|---|---|---|---|
| Liberal and Country | Edward Meagher | 10,198 | 42.8 | |
| Labor | Alfred O'Connor | 8,259 | 34.7 | |
| Labor (A-C) | George White | 5,356 | 22.5 | |
| Total formal votes | | 23,813 | 98.0 | |
| Informal votes | | 475 | 2.0 | |
| Turnout | | 24,288 | 94.5 | |
Two-party-preferred result
| Liberal and Country | Edward Meagher | 13,982 | 58.7 | |
| Labor | Alfred O'Connor | 9,431 | 41.3 | |
| Liberal and Country gain from Labor | | Swing | | |

1952 Victorian state election: Mentone
| Party | Candidate | Votes | % | ±% |
|---|---|---|---|---|
| Labor | George White | 20,870 | 62.5 | +11.4 |
| Liberal and Country | Charles Bridgford | 12,538 | 37.5 | −11.4 |
| Total formal votes | | 33,408 | 98.6 | −0.7 |
| Informal votes | | 467 | 1.4 | +0.7 |
| Turnout | | 33,875 | 94.0 | −0.5 |
| Labor hold | | Swing | +11.4 | |

1950 Victorian state election: Mentone
| Party | Candidate | Votes | % | ±% |
|---|---|---|---|---|
| Labor | George White | 15,046 | 51.4 | +4.0 |
| Liberal and Country | Harry Drew | 14,231 | 48.6 | −4.0 |
| Total formal votes | | 29,277 | 99.3 | 0.0 |
| Informal votes | | 218 | 0.7 | 0.0 |
| Turnout | | 29,495 | 94.5 | +0.4 |
| Labor gain from Liberal and Country | | Swing | +4.0 | |

=== Elections in the 1940s ===
1947 Victorian state election: Mentone
| Party | Candidate | Votes | % | ±% |
|---|---|---|---|---|
| Liberal | Harry Drew | 13,940 | 52.6 | +16.9 |
| Labor | George White | 12,549 | 47.4 | −2.5 |
| Total formal votes | | 26,489 | 99.3 | +0.9 |
| Informal votes | | 192 | 0.7 | −0.9 |
| Turnout | | 26,681 | 94.1 | +5.3 |
| Liberal gain from Labor | | Swing | +6.5 | |

1945 Victorian state election: Mentone
| Party | Candidate | Votes | % | ±% |
|---|---|---|---|---|
| Labor | George White | 10,768 | 49.9 | |
| Liberal | John Warren | 7,708 | 35.7 | |
| Independent | Robert Roberts | 3,095 | 14.4 | |
| Total formal votes | | 21,571 | 98.4 | |
| Informal votes | | 346 | 1.6 | |
| Turnout | | 21,917 | 88.8 | |
Two-party-preferred result
| Labor | George White | 11,633 | 53.9 | |
| Liberal | John Warren | 9,938 | 46.1 | |
| Labor gain from Liberal | | Swing | | |
