= Electoral results for the Division of Isaacs (1949–1969) =

Australian division election results

This is a list of electoral results for the Division of Isaacs (1949–69) in Australian federal elections from the division's creation in 1949 until its abolition in 1969.

== Members ==
Member	Party	Term
William Haworth	Liberal	1949–1969

== Election results ==
=== Elections in the 1960s ===
==== 1966 ====
1966 Australian federal election: Isaacs
Party	Candidate	Votes	%	±%
Liberal	William Haworth	18,468	54.0	+4.4
Labor	Peter Wilkinson	11,712	34.2	−5.7
Democratic Labor	John Hughes	4,032	11.8	+1.3
Total formal votes		34,212	95.2	
Informal votes		1,742	4.8	
Turnout		35,954	92.0	
Two-party-preferred result
Liberal	William Haworth		64.6	+5.5
Labor	Peter Wilkinson		35.4	−5.5
Liberal hold		Swing	+5.5	

==== 1963 ====
1963 Australian federal election: Isaacs
Party	Candidate	Votes	%	±%
Liberal	William Haworth	17,591	49.6	+2.2
Labor	Paul Court	14,159	39.9	+1.0
Democratic Labor	John Hughes	3,710	10.5	−3.2
Total formal votes		35,460	98.1	
Informal votes		688	1.9	
Turnout		36,148	93.4	
Two-party-preferred result
Liberal	William Haworth	20,953	59.1	−0.5
Labor	Paul Court	14,507	40.9	+0.5
Liberal hold		Swing	−0.5	

==== 1961 ====
1961 Australian federal election: Isaacs
Party	Candidate	Votes	%	±%
Liberal	William Haworth	16,493	47.4	+2.0
Labor	Angus McLean	13,527	38.9	+3.4
Democratic Labor	John Hughes	4,781	13.7	+1.8
Total formal votes		34,801	97.0	
Informal votes		1,058	3.0	
Turnout		35,859	91.6	
Two-party-preferred result
Liberal	William Haworth	20,724	59.6	−1.8
Labor	Angus McLean	14,077	40.4	+1.8
Liberal hold		Swing	−1.8	

=== Elections in the 1950s ===
==== 1958 ====
1958 Australian federal election: Isaacs
Party	Candidate	Votes	%	±%
Liberal	William Haworth	16,534	45.4	−9.1
Labor	Barry Jones	12,933	35.5	+2.2
Democratic Labor	John Hughes	4,316	11.9	−0.3
Independent	Elias Cowan	2,624	7.2	+7.2
Total formal votes		36,407	95.8	
Informal votes		1,581	4.2	
Turnout		37,988	93.4	
Two-party-preferred result
Liberal	William Haworth		61.4	−2.9
Labor	Barry Jones		38.6	+2.9
Liberal hold		Swing	−2.9	

==== 1955 ====
1955 Australian federal election: Isaacs
Party	Candidate	Votes	%	±%
Liberal	William Haworth	20,670	54.5	−1.2
Labor	Barry Jones	12,644	33.3	−11.0
Labor (A-C)	John Hughes	4,610	12.2	+12.2
Total formal votes		37,924	96.5	
Informal votes		1,361	3.5	
Turnout		39,285	92.2	
Two-party-preferred result
Liberal	William Haworth		64.3	+8.6
Labor	Barry Jones		35.7	−8.6
Liberal hold		Swing	+8.6	

==== 1954 ====
1954 Australian federal election: Isaacs
Party	Candidate	Votes	%	±%
Liberal	William Haworth	19,315	55.9	+4.4
Labor	Don MacSween	15,240	44.1	+1.5
Total formal votes		34,555	98.6	
Informal votes		504	1.4	
Turnout		35,059	95.1	
Liberal hold		Swing	+3.8	

==== 1951 ====
1951 Australian federal election: Isaacs
Party	Candidate	Votes	%	±%
Liberal	William Haworth	19,548	51.5	−2.5
Labor	John Bourke	16,165	42.6	−3.4
Independent Labor	Sam Goldbloom	2,224	5.9	+5.9
Total formal votes		37,937	97.9	
Informal votes		818	2.1	
Turnout		38,755	94.6	
Two-party-preferred result
Liberal	William Haworth		52.1	−1.9
Labor	John Bourke		47.9	+1.9
Liberal hold		Swing	−1.9	

=== Elections in the 1940s ===
==== 1949 ====
1949 Australian federal election: Isaacs
Party	Candidate	Votes	%	±%
Liberal	William Haworth	21,260	54.0	+1.7
Labor	John Bourke	18,100	46.0	−1.4
Total formal votes		39,360	98.1	
Informal votes		747	1.9	
Turnout		40,107	94.4	
Liberal notional hold		Swing	+1.6	
