= 2007 Albert Park state by-election =

The 2007 Albert Park state by-election was a by-election held on 15 September 2007 for the Victorian Legislative Assembly seat of Albert Park, immediately to the south of Melbourne's central business district.

The by-election was triggered by the resignation of Labor member and Deputy Premier John Thwaites. Former state secretary of the Australian Services Union Martin Foley held the seat for Labor at the election.

== Results ==
Albert Park state by-election, 2007
Party	Candidate	Votes	%	±%
Labor	Martin Foley	13,687	46.83	+5.78
Greens	John Middleton	8,448	28.53	+9.46
Independent	Nigel Strauss	1,702	5.75	+5.75
Democrats	Paul Kavanagh	1,702	5.75	+5.75
Independent	Prodos Marinakis	1,422	4.80	+4.80
Family First	Cameron Eastman	1,306	4.41	+3.33
Democratic Labor	Shane McCarthy	512	1.73	+1.73
Independent	Adrian Jackson	354	1.20	–0.07
Independent	John Dobinson	297	1.00	+1.00
Total formal votes		29,637	92.53	–3.14
Informal votes		2,392	7.47	+3.14
Turnout		32.029	70.67	−15.05
Two-candidate-preferred result
Labor	Martin Foley	17,000	57.07	N/A
Greens	John Middleton	12,788	42.93	N/A
Labor hold		Swing	N/A	
