= Archie Michaelis =

Australian politician (1889–1975)

Sir Archie Michaelis
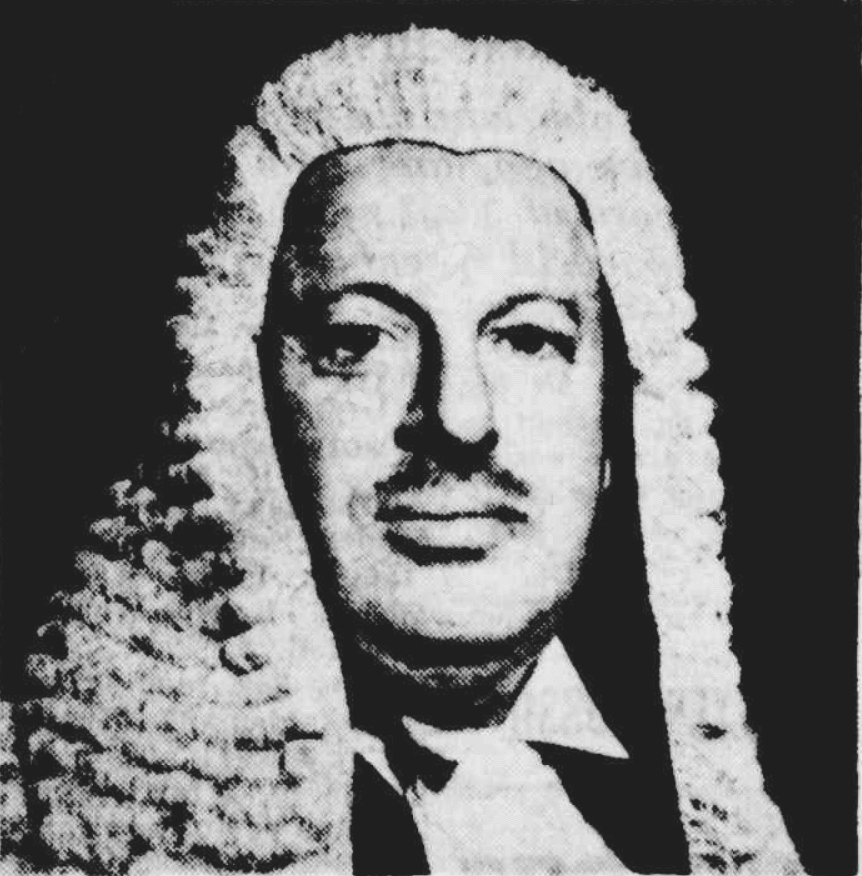

22nd Speaker of the Victorian Legislative Assembly
- In office 20 June 1950 – 31 October 1952
- Preceded by: Thomas Maltby
- Succeeded by: Keith Sutton

Member of the Victorian Legislative Assembly for St Kilda
- In office 14 May 1932 – 31 October 1952
- Preceded by: Burnett Gray
- Succeeded by: John Bourke

Personal details
- Born: Archie Reuben Louis Michaelis; 19 December 1889 St Kilda, Victoria
- Died: 22 April 1975 (aged 85) South Yarra, Victoria, Australia
- Party: United Australia Party; Liberal Party; Liberal and Country Party
- Spouse: Claire Esther Hart (m. 1920)
- Occupation: Company director

Military service
- Allegiance: United Kingdom
- Branch/service: British Army
- Years of service: 1914–1919
- Rank: Lieutenant
- Unit: Royal Field Artillery

Sir Archie Reuben Louis Michaelis (19 December 1889 – 22 April 1975) was an Australian politician. He was a member of the Victorian Legislative Assembly from 1932 to 1952, representing the electorate of St Kilda for the United Australia Party and its successor, the Liberal Party.

== Early life ==
Michaelis was born in St Kilda into a wealthy Jewish family who owned the successful leather tannery Michaelis, Hallenstein & Co. The family home was the historic mansion Linden on Acland Street, now a contemporary arts centre. He attended Wesley College and Cumloden School in St Kilda until 1903, after which his family took him to England to be educated at Harrow School.

In 1908, Michaelis returned to Melbourne, where he began working for the family business and, in 1912, he returned to England to work in the company's London office. He was in England when World War I broke out and immediately enlisted in the British Army, serving with the Honourable Artillery Company in the Middle East. In 1916, was commissioned in the Royal Field Artillery in which he served in Ireland and Greece.

== Political career ==
At the 1932 Victorian election, Michaelis was elected to the Victorian Legislative Assembly representing the seat of St Kilda for the United Australia Party (later to become the Liberal Party). He was made a minister without portfolio in Ian MacFarlan's "stop-gap" ministry from October to November 1945.

In June 1950, Michaelis was elected Speaker of the Victorian Legislative Assembly. He was knighted in the 1952 New Year Honours. In October 1952, he was one of six members of the Victorian parliament who made affidavits to Liberal and Country Party leader Les Norman that they had been offered financial and political incentives by representatives of Thomas Hollway, a disaffected MP and former Premier of Victoria, who needed parliamentary support for a planned motion of no-confidence against the governing Country Party led by John McDonald. Michaelis stated that he had been approached by a man named Raymond Ellinson, who offered him the position of Agent-General, another term as Speaker, and immunity from opposition in the next election. A Royal Commission was established to investigate the charges against Hollway, but it was postponed indefinitely on a legal technicality and never reconvened. In the subsequent state election in December 1952, Michaelis was defeated by the Labor Party candidate John Bourke, and retired from politics.

Victorian Legislative Assembly
Preceded by Burnett Gray	Member for St Kilda; 1932–1952	Succeeded by John Bourke
Political offices
Preceded by Thomas Maltby	Speaker of the Victorian Legislative Assembly; 1950–1952	Succeeded by Keith Sutton
