= Division of Isaacs (1949–1969) =

Former Australian federal electoral division

Isaacs Australian House of Representatives Division
- Created: 1949
- Abolished: 1969
- Namesake: Sir Isaac Isaacs

The Division of Isaacs was an Australian Electoral Division in the state of Victoria. It was located in the inner southern suburbs of Melbourne. It included the suburbs of St Kilda, Ripponlea and part of Caulfield.

The Division was named after Sir Isaac Isaacs, former Chief Justice of Australia and the first Australian-born Governor-General of Australia. It was proclaimed at the redistribution of 11 May 1949, and was first contested at the 1949 Federal election. It was abolished at the redistribution of 21 November 1968 when a separate Division of Isaacs was created in outer Melbourne.

== Members ==
Image	Member	Party	Term	Notes
	William Haworth (1905–1984)	Liberal	10 December 1949 – 29 September 1969	Previously held the Victorian Legislative Assembly seat of Albert Park. Retired after Isaacs was abolished in 1969
