= Electoral district of St Kilda =

Former electoral district of Victoria, Australia

St Kilda Victoria—Legislative Assembly
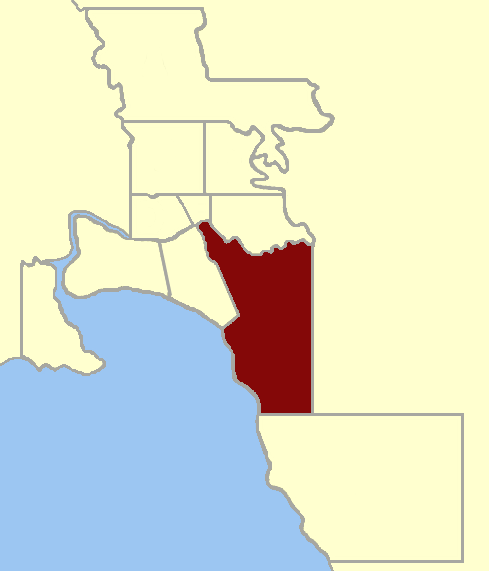
- Location within Greater Melbourne area, 1859
- State: Victoria
- Created: 1856
- Abolished: 1992
- Demographic: Metropolitan
- Coordinates: 37°52′S 144°59′E

The Electoral district of St Kilda was one of the inaugural electoral districts of the Victorian Legislative Assembly, abolished on 2 October 1992.

St Kilda was one of the initial districts created in the first Victorian Legislative Assembly, 1856. It included an area south of the Yarra River and the then villages of St Kilda and Elsternwick.

== Members for St Kilda ==
Two members initially, one after the redistribution of 1889.

Member 1	Party	Term	Member 2	Party	Term
Thomas Fellows	Unaligned	1856–1858	Frederick James Sargood	Unaligned	1856–1857
John Crews	Unaligned	1858–1859	Henry Chapman	Unaligned	1858–1859
Sir Archibald Michie	Unaligned	1859–1861	James Johnston	Unaligned	1859–1864
Kenric Brodribb	Unaligned	1861–1864	James Johnston	Unaligned	1859–1864
Sir Archibald Michie	Unaligned	1864–1865	John Crews	Unliagned	1864–1865
Joshua Snowball	Unaligned	1866–1867	Brice Bunny	Unaligned	1866–1867
Thomas Fellows	Unaligned	1868–1872	Cole Aspinall	Unaligned	1868–1870
Murray Smith	Unaligned	1873–1877	James Stephen	Unaligned	1870–1874
Godfrey Carter	Unaligned	1877–1883	Edward Dixon	Unaligned	1874–1880
Sir Matthew Davies	Unaligned	1883–1889	Joseph Harris	Unaligned	1880–1889
Sir George Turner	Unaligned	1889–1901			
William Williams	Liberal	1901–1902			
Robert McCutcheon	Ministerialist/ Independent Liberal	1902–1917			
Agar Wynne	Unaligned	1917–1920			
Frederic Eggleston	Nationalist	1920–1927			
Burnett Gray	Liberal	1927–1932			
Sir Archie Michaelis	United Australia Party/ Liberal Party	1932–1952			
John Bourke	Labor Party	1952–1955			
Baron Snider	Liberal Party	1955–1964			
Brian Dixon	Liberal Party	1964–1982			
Andrew McCutcheon	Labor Party	1982–1992			

== See also ==
- Parliaments of the Australian states and territories
- List of members of the Victorian Legislative Assembly
