= Nina Taylor =

Australian politician

Nina Taylor MP
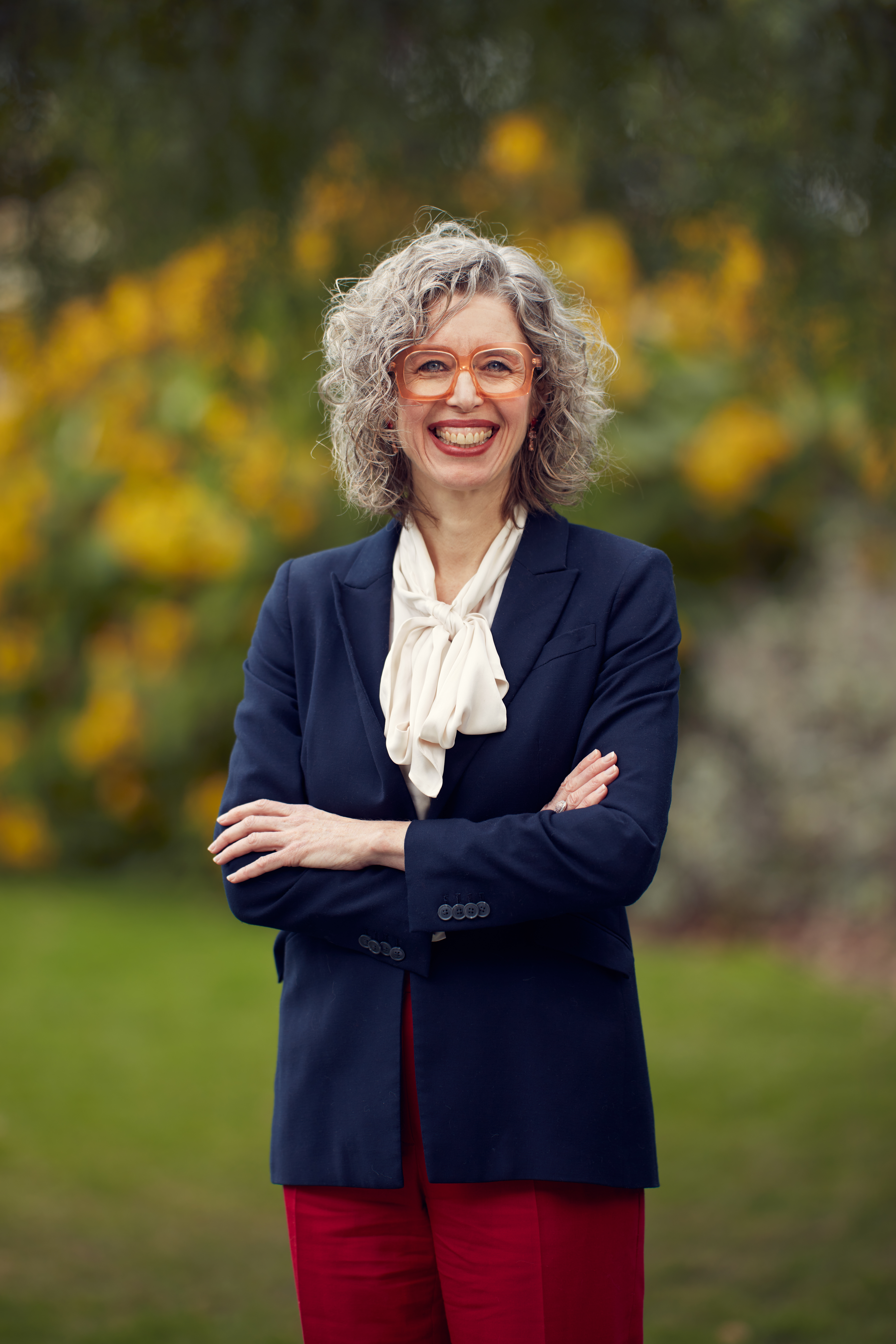
- Taylor in 2022

Cabinet Secretary
- Incumbent
- Assumed office 4 August 2026
- Premier: Ben Carroll
- Preceded by: Tim Richardson

Member of the Victorian Legislative Assembly for Albert Park
- Incumbent
- Assumed office 26 November 2022
- Preceded by: Martin Foley

Government Whip in the Victorian Legislative Council
- In office October 2020 – August 2022
- President: Nazih Elasmar

Member of the Victorian Legislative Council for Southern Metropolitan Region
- In office 24 November 2018 – 26 November 2022

Councillor of the City of Glen Eira for Tucker Ward
- In office 22 October 2016 – 12 December 2018
- Succeeded by: Anne-Marie Cade

Personal details
- Born: Melbourne, Victoria
- Party: Australian Labor Party
- Education: Monash University (BA); University of Queensland (DipEd); University of Melbourne (LLB)
- Occupation: Lawyer; Product manager School teacher
- Website: ninataylormp.com.au

Nina Taylor is an Australian politician who has served as Cabinet Secretary of Victoria since August 2026. She has been an Labor Party member of the Victorian Legislative Assembly since November 2022, representing the district of Albert Park."Nina Taylor". Parliament of Victoria."Statement From The Premier". Premier of Victoria. Government of Victoria. 4 August 2026. Taylor previously served as a member of the Victorian Legislative Council for the Southern Metropolitan Region from 2018 to 2022, including as Government Whip from 2020 to 2022. She was elected to the Legislative Assembly at the 2022 Victorian state election following the retirement of Martin Foley. Before entering state parliament, Taylor served as a councillor of the City of Glen Eira from 2016 to 2018."Glen Eira City Council election results 2016". Victorian Electoral Commission.

== Early life and career before politics ==
Taylor was born in Melbourne, Victoria. She attended Parkdale Primary School and completed her VCE at Firbank Grammar School. She graduated a Bachelor of Arts (BA) at Monash University and attained a Postgraduate Diploma of Education (DipEd) from the University of Queensland. She has also completed a Bachelor of Laws (LLB) at the University of Melbourne. As part of her school teaching education and training, she accomplished the Zertifikat C1 - früher Zentrale Mittelstufenprüfung (Advanced German language and culture) under a scholarship from the Goethe Institut. She is fluent in English, French, and German.

Taylor's first career roles were in secondary school teaching, in education of chronic disease management within the pharmaceutical industry, and in promotion and advocacy in the disability space. She completed articles at Quinert, Rodda and Associates while volunteering at the Melbourne office of the Women's Legal Service, and moved on to become a union organiser in the Community and Public Sector Union prior to her entry into politics.

== Political career ==
Taylor represented Tucker Ward on the Glen Eira City Council from 2016 to 2018, where her advocacy focused on low carbon transport and sustainability measures at the local level.

Taylor was elected at the 2018 Victorian state election as one of two Labor members in the Southern Metropolitan Region in the Legislative Council of the 59th Parliament of Victoria. She was a member of the Legislative Council Environment and Planning Committee, the Public Accounts and Estimates Committee, and the Legislative Council Legal and Social Issues Committee.

In October 2020, Taylor was appointed Government Whip in the Legislative Council and held that role until August 2022. In June 2022, she was appointed a Parliamentary Secretary for Health.

In July 2022, Taylor was pre-selected to contest the 2022 Victorian state election as the Labor candidate for the Legislative Assembly district of Albert Park, triggered by the announcement in June 2022 by the incumbent Labor member, Martin Foley, that he would be retiring from politics. She was successful at the election and was appointed as Parliamentary Secretary for Training and Skills.

In August 2023, Taylor was appointed as Parliamentary Secretary for Justice following a small re-shuffle, where she assisted the Victorian Attorney General Jaclyn Symes, Minister Carbines and Minister Erdogan with a range of priorities and projects across the justice portfolios.

In May 2024, Premier Jacinta Allan announced several changes to Parliamentary Secretary responsibilities, including the reshuffling of Taylor to the Parliamentary Secretary for Education, supporting the Deputy Premier and Minister for Education Ben Carroll with his ministerial responsibilities.

== Personal life ==
Taylor lives in Southbank within her electorate of Albert Park.

Victorian Legislative Assembly
| Preceded by Martin Foley | Member for Albert Park; 2022–present | Incumbent |
