= Agar Wynne =

Australian politician

The Honourable Agar Wynne
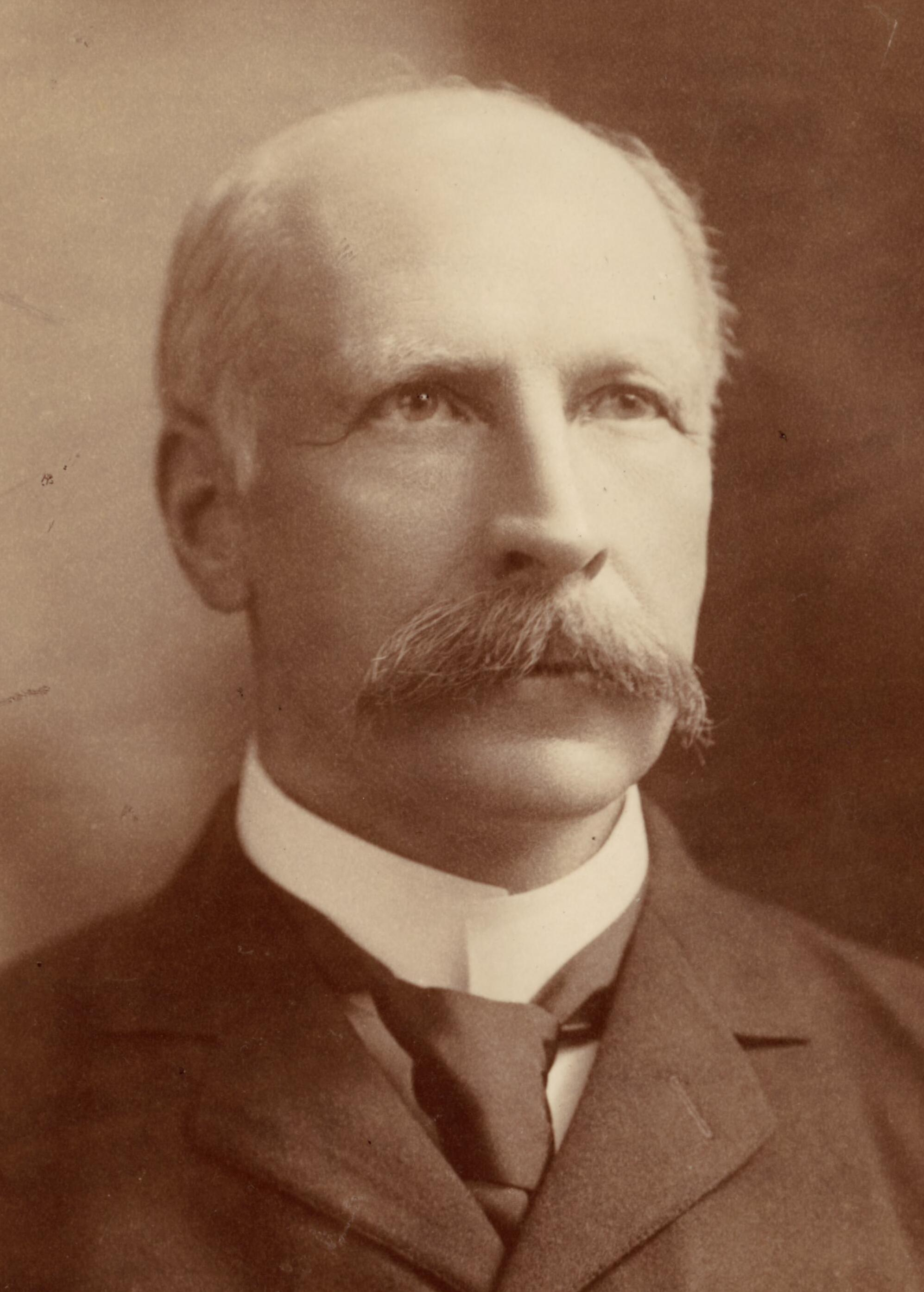

Postmaster-General of Australia
- In office 24 June 1913 – 17 September 1914
- Prime Minister: Joseph Cook
- Preceded by: Charlie Frazer
- Succeeded by: William Spence

Member of the Australian Parliament for Balaclava
- In office 12 December 1906 – 30 July 1914
- Preceded by: George Turner
- Succeeded by: William Watt

Personal details
- Born: 15 July 1850 London, England
- Died: 12 May 1934 (aged 83) Streatham, Victoria, Australia
- Party: Ind Protectionist (1906–09); Liberal (1909–14)
- Spouses: Mary Jane Robertson (m. 1886–1889) Annie Dudgeon (m. 1896)
- Education: University of Melbourne
- Occupation: Attorney

Agar Wynne (15 July 1850 – 12 May 1934) was an Australian lawyer and politician. He began his career in the Victorian Legislative Council and served two terms as Solicitor-General of Victoria. In 1906, he transferred to the federal House of Representatives. He was Postmaster-General of Australia in the Cook Government from 1913 to 1914, but retired from federal politics at the 1914 election. He re-entered Victorian politics and briefly served as Attorney-General of Victoria (1917–1918).

== Early life ==
Wynne was born in London, but his family emigrated to Australia when he was a child. He educated at Melbourne Church of England Grammar School and enrolled in an articled clerk's course at the University of Melbourne and was admitted as an attorney in July 1874. He married Mary Jane Robertson, née Smith, a widow with two children in November 1886. She died in 1889 and in February 1896 he married Annie Dudgeon, née Samuel, a widow with three children.

== Colonial politics ==
In 1888, Wynne won the seat of Western Province in the Victorian Legislative Council which he held until 1903 and was Postmaster-General and Solicitor-General from 1893 to 1894 in Sir James Patterson's government and Solicitor-General from 1900 to 1902 in Sir George Turner's and Sir Alexander Peacock's governments.

== Federal politics ==
Wynne won the seat of Balaclava at the 1906 elections in the Australian House of Representatives as an Independent Protectionist. He joined the Fusion government and served as Postmaster-General in the Cook Ministry from June 1913 to its fall in September 1914, but he did not contest the 1914 elections, apparently because he could not reorganise his department to run on efficient business principles.

== State politics and later life ==
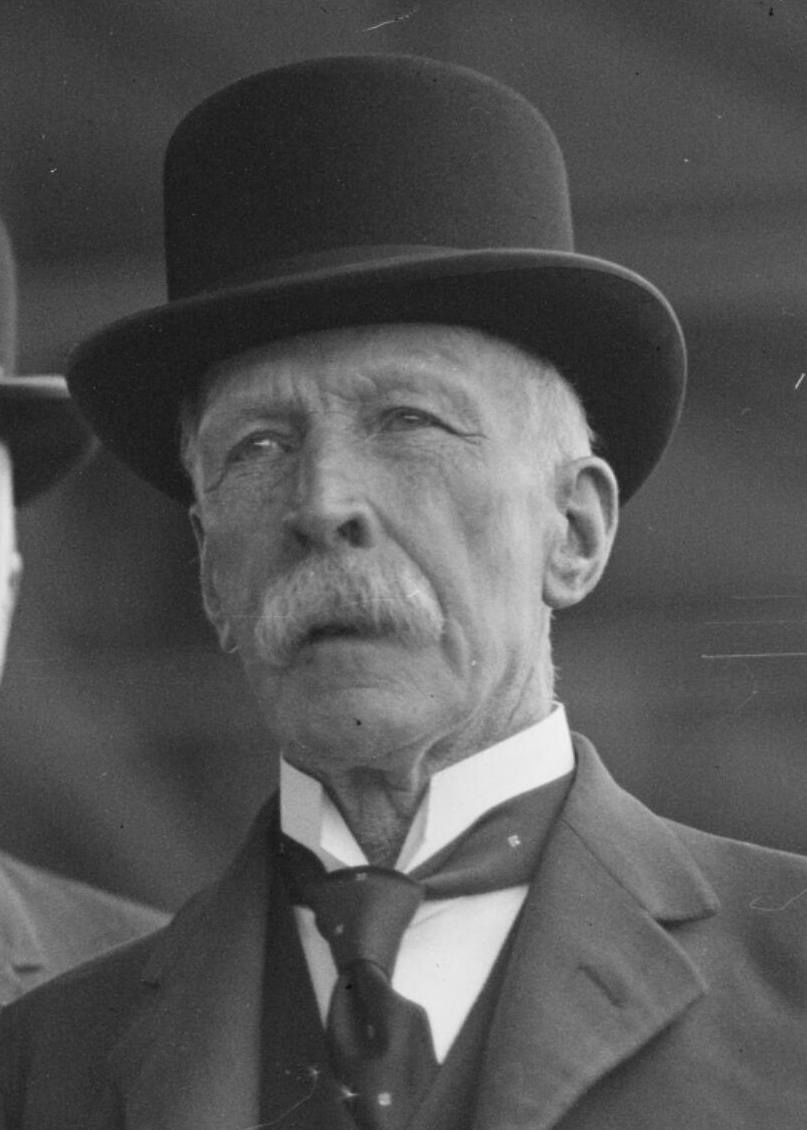
Wynne in 1925

Wynne returned to Victorian politics in 1917, winning the state seat of St Kilda and was Attorney-General, Solicitor-General, Minister of Railways and a Vice-President of the Board of Land and Works from November 1917 to March 1918 in Sir John Bowser's government. He did not stand for re-election in 1920.

== Personal life ==
In 1910, Wynne acquired Nerrin Nerrin, a 7,927-acre (3,208 ha) property near Streatham, Victoria. He ran merino sheep, raised Thoroughbred horses and created a wildlife sanctuary. He also had pastoral interests elsewhere in Victoria and in Queensland.

Wynne was a committee member of the Victoria Racing Club from 1905. He won the Australian Cup twice, with Great Scot in 1903 and Peru in 1908. He also served terms as president of the Melbourne Swimming Club, the St Kilda Yacht Club, the Melbourne Club, and the Athenaeum Club.

A supporter of the war effort, in 1917 Wynne offered £500 to the first member of the proposed Sportsman's Battalion to win the Victoria Cross.

Wynne suffered a series of strokes late in life and died at Nerrin Nerrin on 12 May 1934, aged 83. He was survived by the daughter of his first marriage.

== Sources ==
- Richardson, N. (2016) The Game of their lives, Pan Macmillan: Sydney. ISBN 9781743536667.

Victorian Legislative Council
Preceded by Thomas Cumming	Member for Western Province; 1888–1903; With: 2 others	Succeeded by Alexander MacLeod
Preceded by Isaac Isaacs	Solicitor-General of Victoria; Jun 1893 - Sep 1894	Succeeded by Sir Henry Cuthbert
Preceded by John Davies	Solicitor-General of Victoria; Nov 1900 - Jun 1902	Succeeded by John Davies
Australian House of Representatives
Preceded by George Turner	Member for Balaclava; 1906–1914	Succeeded by William Watt
Preceded by Josiah Thomas	Postmaster-General; 1913–1914	Succeeded by William Spence
Victorian Legislative Assembly
Preceded by Robert McCutcheon	Member for St Kilda; 1917–1920	Succeeded by Frederic Eggleston
Preceded by Harry Lawson	Attorney-General of Victoria & Solicitor-General of Victoria; Nov 1917 - Mar 1918	Succeeded by Harry Lawson as Attorney-General
Preceded by Harry Lawson	Attorney-General of Victoria & Solicitor-General of Victoria; Nov 1917 - Mar 1918	Succeeded by Arthur Robinson as Solicitor-General
