= Arthur Wallace (politician) =

Australian politician

Arthur Knight Wallace (25 December 1879 – 21 August 1952) was an Australian politician.

Wallace was born in Yacka to storekeeper Andrew Wallace and Eliza Hodge and grew up in the Mallee and in Gippsland. He served in the Second Boer War and after his return became a member of the Victorian Socialist Party. On 10 December 1908 he married Elizabeth née Ahern, with whom he had two children. He lived in Adelaide from 1910 to 1916, when he returned to Melbourne as a carpenter. He became president of the Carpenters' Union and served on South Melbourne City Council from 1928 to 1937 (mayor 1933–34). In November 1919 he won a by-election for the Victorian Legislative Assembly seat of Albert Park, representing the Labor Party. He was defeated in March 1927 but re-elected in November 1929. He supported the Premiers' Plan, and so left the Labor Party, retiring in 1932. Wallace died in South Melbourne on 21 August 1952.

Victorian Legislative Assembly
Preceded by Joseph Hannan	Member for Albert Park; 1919–1927	Succeeded by Robert Cuthbertson
Preceded by Robert Cuthbertson	Member for Albert Park; 1929–1932	Succeeded by Harry Drew
