= Edward Meagher =

Australian politician

Edward Raymond Meagher CBE ED (22 November 1908 – 31 May 1988) was an Australian politician.

== Background ==
Meagher was born in Brunswick to storeman Edward Roden Meagher and Florence May Williams. He attended Melbourne Technical College, and from 1933 to 1948 was a municipal officer for Brunswick City Council. On 9 September 1939 he married Winifred Jean Hard; they had one son.

After World War II Meagher briefly ran a newsagency, milk bar and grocery in the Melbourne suburb of Beaumaris, Victoria.

== Army career ==
On 2 May 1940, Meagher was appointed as a captain in the Australian Imperial force. By October of that year he had been promoted to the rank of Major. He served in Syria and Java in World War II before his capture, after which he was a prisoner of war working on the Burma Railway (1942–45). He was appointed a Member of the Order of the British Empire and awarded the Efficiency Decoration for his service.

== Political career ==
In 1955 he was elected to the Victorian Legislative Assembly as the Liberal and Country Party member for Mentone, and transferred to Frankston in 1967. From 1956 to 1958 he was government whip, and from 1958 to 1961, secretary to the cabinet. In 1961, he entered the ministry but was not given a portfolio. He later held the portfolios of Immigration (1962), Transport (1962–67), Housing (1967–72), Forests (1967–73), Aboriginal Affairs (1967–72), and Transport again (1973–76). He retired from politics in 1976, in which year he was appointed Commander of the Order of the British Empire.

== Controversy ==
Meagher, who always positioned himself to the right of the Liberal Party, once famously said: "I didn't get filled full of bullet holes on the Burma Railway to see a bunch of socialists take over this country".

== Death ==
Meagher died in Frankston, Victoria on 31 May 1988. He was survived by his son.

Victorian Legislative Assembly
Preceded by George White	Member for Mentone; 1955–1967	Succeeded by Bill Templeton
New seat	Member for Frankston; 1967–1976	Succeeded by Graeme Weideman
