= Electoral district of Mentone =

Former state electoral district of Victoria, Australia

Mentone Victoria—Legislative Assembly
- State: Victoria
- Created: 1945
- Abolished: 1992
- Namesake: Suburb of Mentone
- Demographic: Metropolitan
- Coordinates: 37°59′S 145°04′E

Mentone was an electoral district of the Legislative Assembly in the Australian state of Victoria from 1945 to 1992. It centred on the south-eastern Melbourne suburb of Mentone.

== Members for Mentone ==
Member	Party	Term
George White	Labor	1945 – 1947
Harry Drew	Liberal	1947 – 1949
Harry Drew	Liberal and Country	1949 – 1950
George White	Labor	1950 – 1955
George White	Labor (Anti-Communist)	1955
Edward Meagher	Liberal and Country	1955 – 1965
Edward Meagher	Liberal	1965 – 1967
Bill Templeton	Liberal	1967 – 1985
Peter Spyker	Labor	1985 – 1992
