= Brice Bunny =

Australian politician

Brice Frederick Bunny (1820 – 2 June 1885) was a judge, Commissioner of Titles and politician in colonial Victoria (Australia).

Bunny was the second son of Jere Brice of Newbury, Berkshire, and Clara, his wife, daughter of Samuel Slocock. He was born at Newbury and was educated at Eton. He entered as a student at Lincoln's Inn in March 1839, and was called to the bar in May 1844.

Bunny emigrated to Victoria in 1852, with the object of making a fortune on the goldfields; but by the advice of his friend, Vice-Chancellor Bacon, took his tools with him in the shape of a law library. After some experience on the Forest Creek diggings, he was admitted to the Victorian bar in October 1853, and commenced practice in Melbourne. Bunny represented St. Kilda in the Victorian Legislative Assembly from February 1866 to December 1867. Bunny acquired a good equity business, and was appointed a County Court Judge in 1873. In October of the next year, however, he exchanged this post for that of Commissioner of Titles, which he held till his death on 2 June 1885. Bunny was survived by his wife, three daughters and three sons.
