= Burnett Gray =

Australian politician

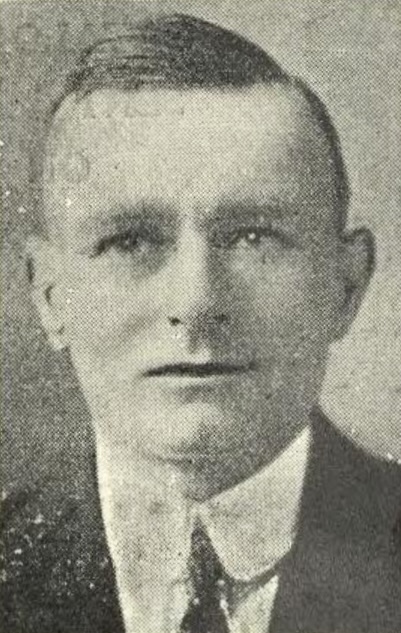
Burnett Gray, 1923

Alfred Charles Burnett Gray (21 August 1884 – 27 May 1968) was an Australian politician and poet.

He was born in Geraldton in Western Australia to merchant Charles Watson Gray and Mary Ann Thomas. From an early age, he wrote poems which were published in The Geraldton Express. Later works appeared in The Bulletin. He worked as a secretary at Melbourne Children's Hospital in 1901 but returned to manage his father's business in Western Australia from 1902 to 1906. He was a gold miner at Bullfinch in 1910 and Ararat in 1911 before becoming a clerk with a Melbourne wool firm in 1912. On 18 March 1910 he married Queenie Hilary Margaret Smith. During World War I he served with the 22nd Battalion and was wounded. He served on St Kilda City Council from 1914 to 1915 and from 1920 to 1948 and was mayor from 1922 to 1923 and from 1926 to 1927; he was the first returned soldier to serve as mayor of any Victorian city. In 1927 he won the seat of St Kilda in the Victorian Legislative Assembly, representing the new Australian Liberal Party. He was re-elected in 1929 but lost his seat in 1932. Gray died in Heidelberg in 1968.

Victorian Legislative Assembly
Preceded by Frederic Eggleston	Member for St Kilda; 1927–1932	Succeeded by Archie Michaelis
