= Keith Sutton (politician) =

Australian politician

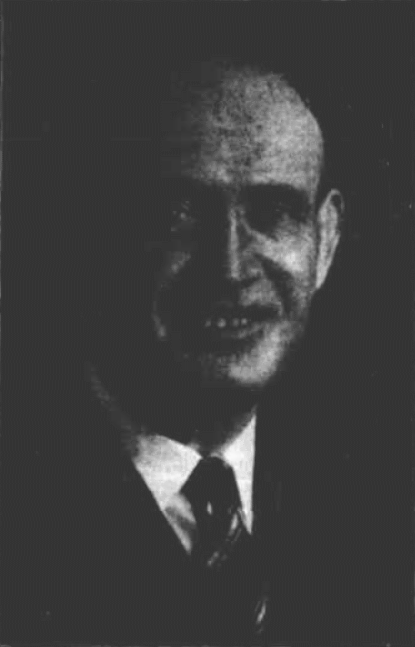
P. K. Sutton.

Patrick Keith Sutton (12 February 1896 – 6 April 1973) was an Australian politician.

Sutton was born at Portland to farmer John Patrick Sutton and Julia Minogue. Educated locally, he was a local journalist and was secretary of the Albert Park branch of the Labor Party from 1938. He married Mary Lucy McIntosh around 1924; they had two sons. From 1939 to 1952 he served on South Melbourne City Council (mayor 1943–44).

On 13 May 1950 Sutton was elected to the Victorian Legislative Assembly for Albert Park. He was elected Speaker in 1952 but lost the position when Labor lost government in 1955. He remained on the backbenches of parliament until 1970, when he retired. Sutton died at Middle Park in 1973.

Victorian Legislative Assembly
Preceded by Sir Archie Michaelis	Speaker of the Victorian Legislative Assembly; 1952–1955	Succeeded by William McDonald
Preceded by Roy Schilling	Member for Albert Park; 1950–1970	Succeeded by Val Doube
