= Robert McCutcheon =

Australian politician

Robert George McCutcheon

Member of the Victorian Legislative Assembly for St Kilda
- In office 1902–1917
- Preceded by: William Williams
- Succeeded by: Agar Wynne

Personal details
- Born: 1841 Omagh, County Tyrone, Ireland
- Died: 20 October 1918 (aged 76–77) St Kilda, Victoria, Australia
- Party: Liberal
- Spouse: Mary Ebblewhite
- Children: 8
- Occupation: Politician, printer, journalist

Robert George McCutcheon (1841 – 20 October 1918) was an Irish-born Australian politician.

He was born in Omagh to John McCutcheon and Margaret Bothwell. His family migrated to Victoria around 1858. McCutcheon spent a year in Calcutta working as a printer before becoming a journalist in Ballarat and Port Fairy. On 13 December 1867, he married Mary Ebblewhite, who was later associated with the Australian Women's National League they had eight children.

In 1873 he moved to Melbourne to take over his brother's position in the printing firm Mason Firth & McCutcheon which he owned outright from 1878. He was elected to the Victorian Legislative Assembly as the member for St Kilda. Although a Liberal he opposed the government of Thomas Bent in 1908. He served as a minister without portfolio from 1915 to 1916, when he resigned. He retired from politics in 1917.

McCutcheon died in St Kilda in 1918.

Victorian Legislative Assembly
Preceded by William Williams	Member for St Kilda; 1902–1917	Succeeded by Agar Wynne
