= George White (Australian politician) =

Australian politician

George Edward White (14 January 1905 – 5 May 1986) was an Australian politician, who was a member of the Victorian Legislative Assembly for the electorate of Mentone, representing the Labor Party, from 1945 to 1947 and 1950 to 1955, and the Australian Labor Party (Anti-Communist) (Democratic Labor Party) from March to April 1955.

Victorian Legislative Assembly
Preceded by new seat	Member for Mentone; 1945–1947	Succeeded by Harry Drew
Preceded by Harry Drew	Member for Mentone; 1950–1955	Succeeded by Edward Meagher
