= Roy Schilling =

Australian politician

Reginald Ernest Roy Schilling (30 August 1896 – 7 May 1979) was an Australian politician.

He was born in Bendigo to blacksmith Frederick William Carl Schilling and Isabella Cameron. He attended state schools and became a law clerk in 1910, studying at night school and Melbourne University before qualifying as a solicitor. He served with the Australian Recruit Depot Battalion in 1918, and in 1925 was called to the bar. Around 1929 he married Iris Gwendoline Colthurst, with whom he had a daughter, Marlene, born in Melbourne in 1934. During World War II he served in the Royal Australian Air Force, and after the war he returned to university, qualifying for his BA and LLB. In 1947 he was elected to the Victorian Legislative Assembly as the Liberal member for Albert Park, but he was defeated in 1950. A supporter of Thomas Hollway, he ran as an Electoral Reform League candidate in 1952, but had returned to the Liberal Party by 1958. Schilling died in Elsternwick in 1979.

Victorian Legislative Assembly
Preceded by Frank Crean	Member for Albert Park; 1947–1950	Succeeded by Keith Sutton
