= Martin Foley (politician) =

Australian Politician

The Honourable Martin Foley MP
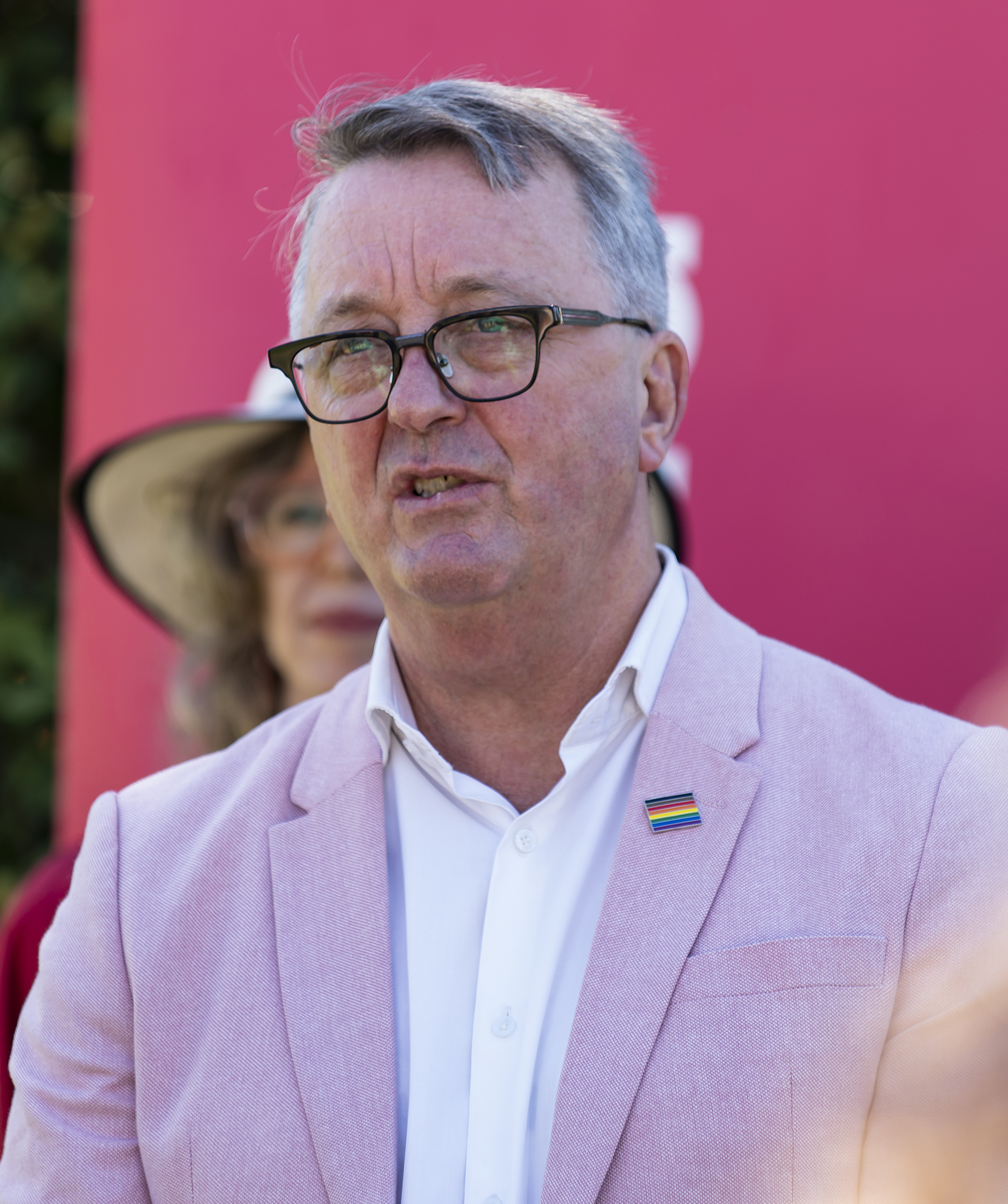
- Foley in 2022

Minister for Health Minister for Ambulance Services
- In office 26 September 2020 – 27 June 2022
- Premier: Daniel Andrews
- Preceded by: Jenny Mikakos
- Succeeded by: Mary-Anne Thomas

Minister for Equality
- In office 4 December 2014 – 27 June 2022
- Premier: Daniel Andrews
- Preceded by: New Ministry
- Succeeded by: Harriet Shing

Minister for Mental Health
- In office 4 December 2014 – 29 September 2020
- Premier: Daniel Andrews
- Preceded by: Mary Wooldridge
- Succeeded by: James Merlino

Minister for Creative Industries
- In office 4 December 2014 – 29 September 2020
- Premier: Daniel Andrews
- Preceded by: New Ministry
- Succeeded by: Danny Pearson

Minister for Housing, Disability and Ageing
- In office 4 December 2014 – 29 November 2018
- Premier: Daniel Andrews
- Preceded by: Wendy Lovell (Housing); Mary Wooldridge (Disability)
- Succeeded by: Richard Wynne (Housing); Luke Donnellan (Disability and Ageing)

Member of the Victorian Legislative Assembly for Albert Park
- In office 15 September 2007 – 26 November 2022
- Preceded by: John Thwaites
- Succeeded by: Nina Taylor

Personal details
- Born: 17 May 1962 (age 64) Mornington, Victoria
- Party: Labor Party
- Education: University of Melbourne; Monash University
- Website: www.martinfoley.com.au

Martin Peter Foley (born 17 May 1962) is a former Australian politician. He was a Labor Party member of the Victorian Legislative Assembly between 2007 and 2022, representing Albert Park. He was the Minister for Equality in the First and Second Andrews Ministry between December 2014 and June 2022 and the Minister for Health and Minister for Ambulance Services between September 2020 and June 2022. He was previously the Minister for Mental Health and Minister for Creative Industries prior to September 2020.

== Early life ==
Foley was born in Mornington. He was awarded a Bachelor of Arts (history and politics) in 1987 from Monash University and received a Master of Commerce in 2000 from the University of Melbourne. From 1988–2003, he worked with the Australian Services Union before becoming chief of staff to the state Minister for Agriculture. In 2006, he became Chief of Staff to the Minister for Police.

== Political career ==
In 2007, Foley was elected to the Legislative Assembly following his preselection as the Labor candidate for the seat of Albert Park in the by-election which resulted from Deputy Premier John Thwaites's resignation. With the defeat of the Brumby Government in December 2010 and the appointment of Daniel Andrews as the new leader of the Labor Party, Foley became a Parliamentary Secretary to various Opposition Shadow Ministers until in late 2013, Foley was appointed as Shadow Minister for Water, Arts & Youth Affairs and Shadow Minister assisting the Leader of the Opposition on Equality.

Following the election of the Andrews Labor Government at the November 2014 election, Foley was appointed to Cabinet as Minister for Housing, Disability and Ageing, Minister for Mental Health, Minister for Equality and Minister for Creative Industries. He lost his housing and disability portfolios following the 2018 state election.

On 26 September 2020, following the resignation of Victorian health minister Jenny Mikakos that morning, Victorian premier Daniel Andrews announced that Foley would be her replacement as health minister. Foley was sworn in as the Minister for Health and Minister for Ambulance Services later that day. His portfolios of creative industries and mental health were taken over by Danny Pearson and James Merlino three days later on 29 September 2020.

In June 2022, Foley announced he would retire at the November state election, wanting to spend more time with his family. He stepped down from his ministerial roles on 27 June 2022.

Victorian Legislative Assembly
Preceded by John Thwaites	Member for Albert Park; 2007–2022	Succeeded by Nina Taylor
Political offices
Preceded by Jenny Mikakos	Minister for Health; 2020–2022	Succeeded by Mary-Anne Thomas
Preceded by Jenny Mikakos	Minister for Ambulance Services; 2020–2022	Succeeded by Mary-Anne Thomas
New title	Minister for Equality; 2014–2022	Succeeded by Harriet Shing
Preceded by Mary Wooldridge	Minister for Mental Health; 2014–2020	Succeeded by James Merlino
New title	Minister for Creative Industries; 2014–2020	Succeeded by Danny Pearson
Preceded by Wendy Lovell as Minister for Housing	Minister for Housing, Disability and Ageing; 2014–2018	Succeeded by Richard Wynne as Minister for Housing
Preceded by Mary Wooldridge as Minister for Disability Services and Reform	Minister for Housing, Disability and Ageing; 2014–2018	Succeeded by Luke Donnellan as Minister for Disability, Ageing & Carers
