= Frederic Eggleston =

Australian politician

Sir Frederic Eggleston
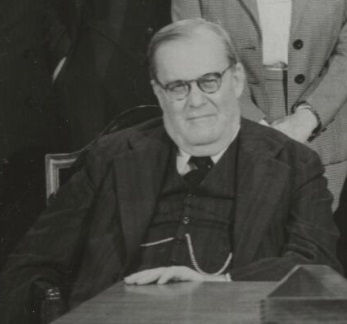
- Born: 17 October 1875; Brunswick, Victoria, Australia
- Died: 12 November 1954 (aged 79)
- Education: University of Melbourne
- Occupations: Diplomat, Lawyer, Author, Politician

Sir Frederic William Eggleston (17 October 1875 – 12 November 1954) was an Australian lawyer, politician, diplomat and writer.

== Early life ==
The eldest son of lawyer John Waterhouse Eggleston and his wife, Emily, his grandfather was the Methodist minister Rev. John Eggleston. His maternal grandparents were also Methodists. His mother died early in his life in 1884 and his father married Ada Crouch in 1887. He read law at Queen's College, Melbourne.

== Career ==
Eggleston was on good terms with John Latham and in 1902 founded a group known as the 'Boobooks' with him. Eggleston was elected to the Victorian Legislative Assembly as the member for Member for St Kilda in 1920 and was appointed Attorney-General of Victoria and Solicitor-General of Victoria (1924–1927) in the government of John Allan.

Frederic Eggleston was appointed Australia's first Ambassador to China in 1941. For his role as Chairman of the Commonwealth Grants Commission, in the 1941 King's Birthday honours he was made a Knight Bachelor. Eggleston met with British biochemist and Sinologist Joseph Needham at chance encounter in a monastery in China. They had lunch with a group that included Chinese monks, three itinerant Tibetan monks, and a "living Buddha".

== Later life ==
At the end of 1952 he published his Reflections of an Australian Liberal (F. W. Cheshire). He died in 1954.

Civic offices
Preceded by	Mayor of Caulfield; 1914 – 1915	Succeeded by
Victorian Legislative Assembly
Preceded by Agar Wynne	Member for St Kilda; 1920–1927	Succeeded by Burnett Gray
Political offices
Preceded by	Minister of Water Supply; 1924	Succeeded by John Gordon
Preceded by Francis Old as Minister of Agriculture and Railways	Minister of Railways; 1924	Succeeded by Edmond Hogan as Minister for Agriculture and Railways
Preceded by Edmond Hogan	Minister of Railways; 1924–1926	Succeeded by John Allan
Preceded by Bill Slater	Attorney-General of Victoria; Solicitor-General of Victoria; 1924–1927	Succeeded by John Allan
Diplomatic posts
New title	Australian Minister to China; 1941–1944	Succeeded by Keith Officer as Chargé d'affaires
Preceded by Owen Dixon	Australian Minister to the United States; 1944–1946	Succeeded by Norman Makin
Preceded by Owen Dixon	Australian Ambassador to the United States; 1946	Succeeded by Norman Makin
