= Bill Templeton =

Australian politician (1927–2005)

Thomas William Templeton OAM (23 December 1927 – 20 May 2005) was an Australian politician.

Templeton was born in Hamilton to Donald Polson Templeton and Thelma Edith Nellie Nunn. He was a pharmaceutical chemist, and owned a business at Mordialloc from 1955 to 1977. A founding member and secretary of the local Young Liberal Party in 1946, he served on Mordialloc City Council from 1964 to 1971, including a period as mayor from 1968 to 1969.

In 1967 Templeton was elected to the Victorian Legislative Assembly as the member for Mentone. He was appointed party whip in 1979 and served until his defeat in 1985. On Australia Day 1987 he was awarded a Medal of the Order of Australia for services to parliament and the community. Templeton died in 2006.

Victorian Legislative Assembly
Preceded by Edward Meagher	Member for Mentone; 1967–1985	Succeeded by Peter Spyker
