= Robert Cuthbertson =

Australian politician

Robert Melville Cuthbertson (18 June 1869 – 4 July 1940) was an Australian politician.

He was born in Bacchus Marsh to builder James Cuthbertson and Jessie Watson. He was educated locally and became an accountant and then an investor. He married Annie Robertson around 1907; they had one son. From 1912 to 1933 he served as a member of South Melbourne City Council, with a period as mayor from 1918 to 1919. He was a founding member of the Nationalist Party and was federal treasurer of the party in 1925. In 1927 he was elected to the Victorian Legislative Assembly for Albert Park. He was appointed Assistant Minister of Public Instruction in 1928, but he lost his seat in 1929. Cuthbertson died in 1940.

Victorian Legislative Assembly
Preceded by Arthur Wallace	Member for Albert Park; 1927–1929	Succeeded by Arthur Wallace
