= Electoral district of Albert Park =

State electoral district of Victoria, Australia

Albert Park Victoria—Legislative Assembly
- Interactive map of electoral district boundaries from the 2022 state election
- State: Victoria
- Created: 1889
- MP: Nina Taylor
- Party: Labor
- Namesake: Suburb of Albert Park
- Electors: 48,949 (2018)
- Area: 21 km^{2} (8.1 sq mi)
- Demographic: Inner metropolitan
- Coordinates: 37°50′S 144°57′E

The electoral district of Albert Park is one of the electoral districts of Victoria, Australia, for the Victorian Legislative Assembly. It covers an area of 21 square kilometres (8.1 sq mi) in inner suburban Melbourne, and includes the suburbs of Albert Park, Middle Park, Port Melbourne, St Kilda West, Southbank, South Melbourne, South Wharf, and parts of St Kilda. It lies within the Southern Metropolitan Region of the upper house, the Legislative Council.

It was first proclaimed in 1889, and has been held by the Labor Party without interruption since the 1950 election.

John Thwaites was the member from 1992 to 2007, serving as deputy leader of Victorian Labor from 1996 to 2007 and as Deputy Premier of Victoria from 1999 to 2007. He and Premier Steve Bracks, the member for neighbouring Williamstown, both resigned on 30 July 2007. A by-election was held on 15 September 2007, which resulted in Martin Foley retaining the seat for Labor.

== Members for Albert Park ==
Member	Party	Term
John Nimmo	Liberal	1889–1892
John White	Conservative	1892–1902
George Elmslie	Labour	1902–1918
Joseph Hannan	Labor	1918–1919
Arthur Wallace	Labor	1919–1927
Robert Cuthbertson	Nationalist	1927–1929
Arthur Wallace	Labor	1929–1932
Arthur Wallace	Independent	1929–1932
Harry Drew	United Australia	1932–1937
Harry Drew	Independent	1932–1937
William Haworth	United Australia	1937–1944
William Haworth	Liberal	1944–1945
Frank Crean	Labor	1945–1947
Roy Schilling	Liberal	1947–1950
Keith Sutton	Labor	1950–1970
Val Doube	Labor	1970–1979
Bunna Walsh	Labor	1979–1992
John Thwaites	Labor	1992–2007
Martin Foley	Labor	2007–2022
Nina Taylor	Labor	2022–present

== Election results ==
2022 Victorian state election: Albert Park
Party	Candidate	Votes	%	±%
Labor	Nina Taylor	14,254	36.4	−7.0
Liberal	Lauren Sherson	11,659	29.8	−1.6
Greens	Kim Samiotis	8,178	20.9	+4.5
Independent	Georgie Dragwidge	2,294	5.9	+5.9
Animal Justice	Cassandra Westwood	1,207	3.1	−0.9
Liberal Democrats	Lance Smart	534	1.4	+1.4
Freedom	Elizabeth Antunovic	518	1.3	+1.3
Family First	Viorel Bradea	466	1.2	+1.2
Total formal votes		39,110	96.6	+1.4
Informal votes		1,396	3.4	−1.4
Turnout		40,506	83.0	−0.7
Two-party-preferred result
Labor	Nina Taylor	23,916	61.2	−1.9
Liberal	Lauren Sherson	15,194	38.8	+1.9
Labor hold		Swing	−1.9	

Two-candidate-preferred vote results in Albert Park since 1940 View source data.
