= John Thwaites (Australian politician) =

Australian politician

The Honourable John Thwaites AM
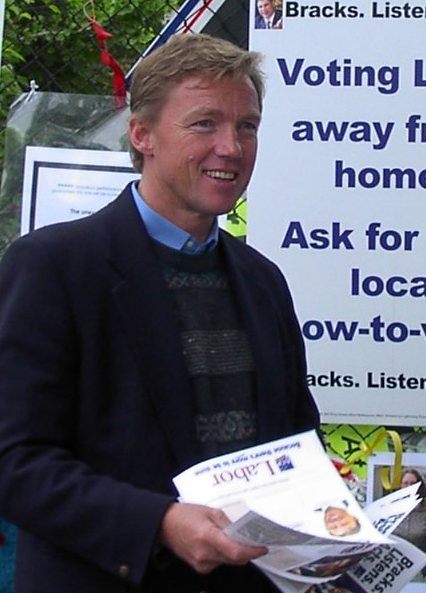
- Thwaites in 2002

25th Deputy Premier of Victoria
- In office 21 October 1999 – 30 July 2007
- Premier: Steve Bracks
- Preceded by: Pat McNamara
- Succeeded by: Rob Hulls

Assembly Member for Albert Park
- In office 3 October 1992 – 6 August 2007
- Preceded by: Bunna Walsh
- Succeeded by: Martin Foley

Personal details
- Born: Oxford, England, United Kingdom
- Party: Labor
- Spouse: Melanie Eagle
- Profession: Barrister

Johnstone William "John" Thwaites AM is an Australian former politician, and served as Deputy Premier of the state of Victoria from 1999 to 2007.

== Early life and education ==
Thwaites was born in Oxford, England, and came to Australia as a child with his family.

He was educated at Melbourne Grammar School and Monash University, Melbourne, where he graduated in science and law. He practised as a barrister before entering politics. He was a ministerial advisor to Labor Party state government ministers Jim Kennan and Andrew McCutcheon before being elected to the Victorian Legislative Assembly for the seat of Albert Park.

== Political career ==
=== Local council and mayor ===
Thwaites was elected to the South Melbourne City Council in 1985 and served until 1993, and was Mayor in 1991–92.

=== State Parliament ===
Thwaites entered Parliament at the 1992 election, as member for the inner city seat of Albert Park. Labor, having been in office for ten years, suffered a landslide defeat at the hands of the Liberal Party under Jeff Kennett. In the last three years of its term, Labor, under Joan Kirner, had presided over a sharp recession and a series of financial disasters including the forced sale of the State Bank of Victoria, and the collapse of Pyramid Building Society. Most commentators expected Labor to be in opposition for many years.

In the greatly reduced Labor Caucus, Thwaites gained rapid promotion. He became Shadow Minister for Health in January 1994, Shadow Minister for Health and Community Services in April 1996, and Deputy Leader of the Opposition in December 1996. Thwaites belonged to neither of the dominant factions of the Victorian Labor Party, the right-wing Labor Unity or the left-wing Socialist Left, and was an acceptable compromise candidate as Deputy to the then Opposition Leader, John Brumby.

Labor was again heavily defeated at the 1996 election, and it became apparent that the party could not recover under Brumby's leadership. Thwaites had been a loyal deputy to Brumby, although in March 1999 he supported moves to have Brumby resign. Thwaites could not become leader himself because he had a small factional base, but instead supported Steve Bracks for the leadership.

As Shadow Minister for Health, Thwaites campaigned against the Kennett Government’s cuts to health and the privatisation of ambulance services. He used Freedom of Information documents to highlight long delays in hospital emergency departments and health budget cuts. (“Austin in patient crisis, says Labor”, The Age, 3 October 1996.) Thwaites also highlighted concerns about privatisation of ambulance dispatching to a private company, Intergraph, which the Auditor General found “at best involved serious mismanagement or, at worst, constituted corrupt activity”. (“State backs Intergraph reports bid”, The Age, 3 September 1999). The Intergraph affair and concerns about hospital privatisation and ambulance services were major issues in the 1999 state election.

=== Deputy Leader ===
In September 1999 Bracks polled surprisingly well in the election, and three rural independent members gave Labor the opportunity to govern as a minority government. As Deputy Leader, Thwaites became Deputy Premier and was given the senior Health portfolio, with a mandate to increase funding to the public health system which had been the subject of cutbacks under the Liberal government. He was also Minister for Planning from 1999 to February 2002. Shortly after taking office, Thwaites cancelled the proposed privatisation of the Austin Hospital and announced plans for the government to rebuild the hospital with public funds. (“Labor to cancel Austin hospital privatisation” The Age 28 October 1999) ("Can the new government fix health? The Age 20 November 1999"). Like all state health ministers, he had only limited success in reducing waiting lists at public hospitals, but did succeed in restoring the numbers of nurses.

One of Thwaites first actions as Health Minister was to ban smoking in restaurants. He later introduced legislation to ban smoking in gaming venues.

As Planning Minister, Thwaites put controls on high-rise development around Port Phillip Bay and introduced a residential planning code, Rescode, to preserve neighbourhood character in planning decisions. He also initiated "Melbourne 2030", a 30-year strategy plan for Melbourne.

After the November 2002 state election, at which Labor was returned with a record majority, Thwaites was appointed Minister for Environment, Water and Victorian Communities. Thwaites' term as Minister for Water coincided with the millennium drought in southeast Australia that put significant pressure on urban and rural water supplies. Premier Steve Bracks and Thwaites led a major water saving campaign commencing in 2003 that by 2006 had reduced water use per head by 22 per cent compared to the 1990s.

Thwaites introduced major reforms to water policy and legislation in Victoria including giving the environment a statutory right to water, reforming irrigation water rights and establishing sustainable water planning strategies. He also oversaw programs to return environmental flows to the Murray, Snowy, and Thomson Rivers.

In 2007, after Victoria had experienced its worst year of drought and the lowest streamflows in the state's history, Premier Steve Bracks and Thwaites announced the "Our Water Our Future" plan which included a new desalination plant at Wonthaggi, modernising Victoria’s irrigation system to save water lost through inefficiencies, expanding a water grid across Victoria and increased recycling and water conservation.

As Minister for Environment, Thwaites introduced measures to lower greenhouse emissions and water consumption. Victoria was the first state to introduce five-star energy efficiency requirements for new homes together with incentives for rainwater tanks and solar hot water.

Thwaites also oversaw a major expansion of Victoria's national park system, including creation of the Great Otway National Park, and removed cattle grazing from the Alpine National Park.

In the second term of the Bracks government, Thwaites led the development of the government's social justice strategy, "A Fairer Victoria", working with other social policy ministers. The strategy committed $788 million in the 2005 state budget and $818 million in the 2006 budget to tackle disadvantage across a range of areas including early childhood development, mental health, disability, and community development. It was described by the head of the Brotherhood of St Laurence as “an unprecedented effort to make Victoria a better place for those who are disadvantaged and vulnerable.”

Thwaites was re-elected at Victorian elections 2006 with a comfortable but slightly reduced majority. While there was some speculation he might be dumped as Deputy Premier, Premier Bracks has supported him continuing in this role. In the cabinet re-shuffle after the election he became minister for climate change but lost the portfolio of Victorian communities.

In June 2007, amid rumours of Bracks resigning as premier, there was a series of leaks from inside government about Mr Thwaites and his family being given free accommodation, lift passes, food and drink at ski resorts over the last five years without declaring it. The family stayed at government-owned apartments at the invitation of the management boards, which he had appointed. Documents obtained under freedom-of-information laws show Thwaites made 17 taxpayer-funded visits to Victoria's snowfields and national parks between 2003 and 2007. He had eight stays at Tidal River on Wilsons Promontory, five trips to Mount Hotham and two each to Mount Buller and Falls Creek in the four years he was environment minister. Expenses for the trips, which each required at least one night's accommodation, totalled more than $17,500.

==== Resignation ====
When Premier Steve Bracks announced his surprise resignation on 27 July 2007, only hours later Thwaites announced he too would resign. He said he had been Deputy Leader of the Parliamentary Labor Party in Victoria for ten years and it was now time "to give someone else a go and bring in some new blood". He officially resigned on 30 July 2007 and from parliament on 6 August 2007.

== After politics ==
After leaving politics, Thwaites became a professor at Monash University and chair of Monash Sustainable Development Institute and ClimateWorks Australia.

He has also been appointed to a number of senior board positions, including president, Australian Centre for the Moving Image (ACMI), chair Australian Building Codes Board, chair the Climate Group, chair Peter Cullen Trust, and director of Green Building Council of Australia and Fair Trade Australia New Zealand. He was also a consultant to Maddocks Solicitors with specialty areas of practice in environment, water and climate change between 2008 and 2015.

In 2011, Thwaites was appointed as chair of the Australian Building Codes Board, the body responsible for developing and managing Australia's building regulations. In 2012, he was appointed as chair of the National Sustainability Council that provides independent advice to the Australian Government on sustainability issues and produces independent reports on sustainability indicators and trends.

Thwaites is currently the chair of Melbourne Water, which manages Melbourne’s water, sewerage, drainage and waterway health, and sits on a number of water advisory bodies.

Thwaites has been appointed to a number of reviews and advisory bodies for the federal and state governments. In 2016, the Victorian Government appointed him with Terry Mulder and Patricia Faulkner to conduct an independent review of retail electricity and gas markets.

The review recommended major reforms to energy pricing for households and small business including a "no frills" electricity price to be regulated by the Essential Services Commission, the end of misleading marketing, and requiring retailers to fix offer prices for 12 months. The Victorian Government has now implemented most of these reforms.

In 2017, amid public concern about flammable cladding on buildings, Thwaites was appointed with former Victorian Premier Ted Baillieu to co-chair the Victorian Cladding Taskforce to oversee the investigation and audit of buildings with dangerous cladding. Following recommendations of the Cladding Taskforce, the Victorian Government conducted a statewide audit of multi-story buildings, boosted enforcement of building regulations and announced a $600 million plan to remove dangerous cladding from buildings.

Since leaving politics, Thwaites has worked with governments, business and academics to promote sustainable development and the United Nations Sustainable Development Goals. In 2012, he was appointed by the Australian Government as chair of the National Sustainability Council to provide independent advice to the government on sustainability issues. The Council produced the Sustainable Australia Report 2013. He currently chairs the National Sustainable Development Council, which in 2018 produced the "Transforming Australia: SDG Progress report" on Australia's progress in implementing the United Nations Sustainable Development Goals (SDGs). He is currently co-chair of the Leadership Council of the UN Sustainable Development Solutions Network (SDSN) launched by the Secretary-General of the United Nations to mobilise universities in support of the SDGs.

In July 2020, Thwaites was appointed to The Lancet Covid-19 Commission, which aims to speed up global and equitable solutions to the pandemic.

== Recognition and awards ==
Thwaites was appointed Member of the Order of Australia for "significant service to the environment, and to the people and Parliament of Victoria" in the 2021 Australia Day Honours.

Victorian Legislative Assembly
Preceded by Bunna Walsh	Member for Albert Park; 1992–2007	Succeeded by Martin Foley
Political offices
Preceded by Pat McNamara	Deputy Premier of Victoria; 1999–2007	Succeeded by Rob Hulls
