= Harry Drew =

Australian politician

Harold Vincent Drew (12 October 1902 – 2 December 1970) was an accountant, Australian politician, company director and the Chief President of the Australian Natives' Association.

== Early years ==
Harry Drew was born in South Melbourne to dairyman Edward Harvey Drew and Charlotte Helen Farnell. He attended University High School and became an accountant, working for E. H. Shackell and Co., Holden, from 1927 to 1931, and Vocalion (A'asia) Ltd from 1931 to 1933. He was also made a director of Vocalion in 1931.

== Australian Natives' Association ==
Drew was a member of Middle Park A.N.A. Branch No.224. He was elected to the A.N.A. Board in 1930. He was elected Chief President at Mildura Annual Conference in 1934. He presided over Queenscliff Annual Conference in 1935. He was also Chairman of the Metropolitan Committee in 1929-1930

Drew was a skilled debater. He had a fluent ready wit and gave attention to detail. The Western Australian Secessionist movement was current during his Chief Presidency and he proposed that their grievances should be addressed though constitutional means, not secession. National health insurance and the development of Northern Australia were significant national issues to which he publicly referred.

== Politics ==
In 1932, Drew was elected to the Victorian Legislative Assembly as the United Australia Party member for Albert Park where he served for five years. He lost endorsement in 1937 and was defeated as an independent candidate.

After return from the armed services in 1947 he was elected to the Victorian Legislative Assembly for Mentone for the Liberal Party, but was defeated in 1950.

== World War II ==
Drew joined the Royal Australian Air Force in 1939 and served as a squadron leader until 1947. He served in Victoria and New South Wales during the war.

== Family ==
On 18 October 1940, Drew married Shirley Doreen Brand, with whom he had two children.

== Later years ==
Drew returned to work part-time as an accountant, but increasingly suffered from ill health. Drew died in Melbourne in 1970.

Victorian Legislative Assembly
Preceded by Arthur Wallace	Member for Albert Park; 1932–1937	Succeeded by William Haworth
Preceded by George White	Member for Mentone; 1947–1950	Succeeded by George White
