= William Haworth =

Australian politician

The Honourable Sir William Haworth
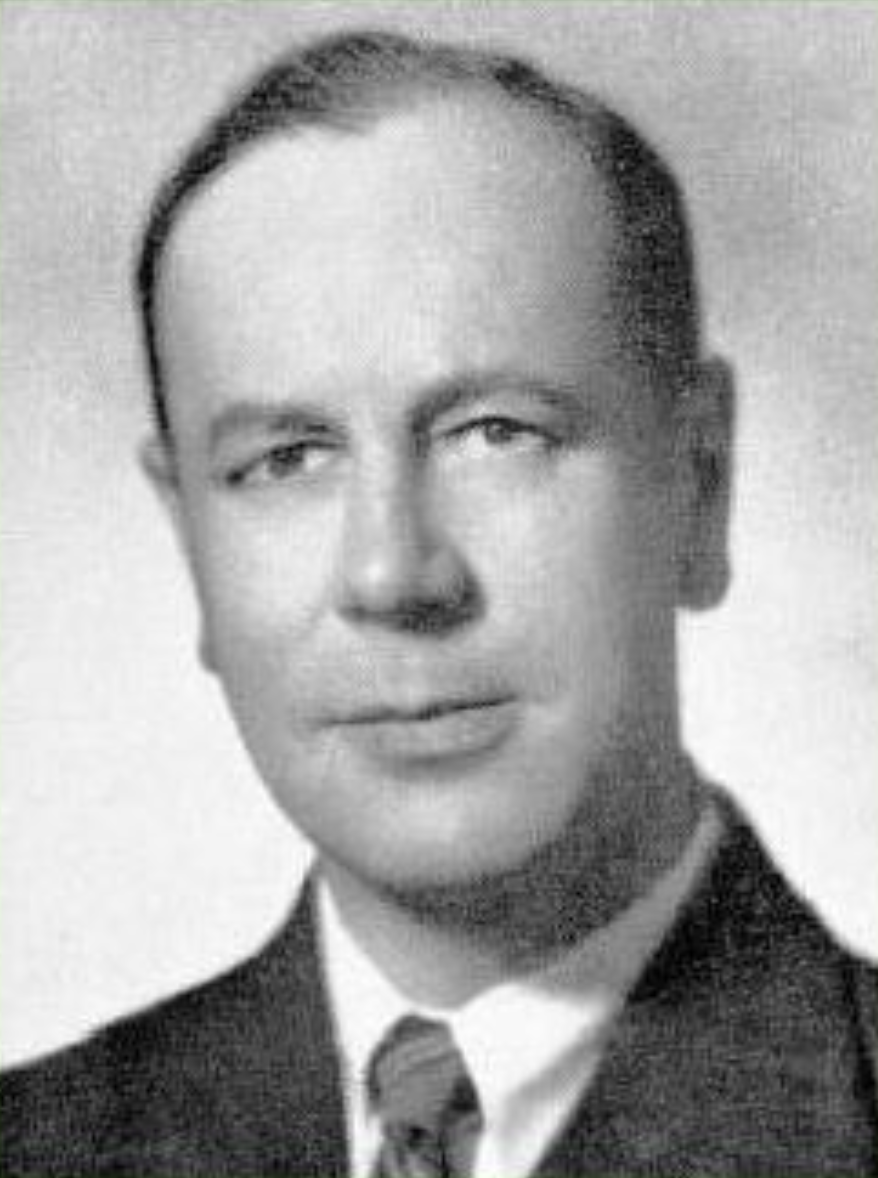

Member of the Australian Parliament for Isaacs
- In office 10 December 1949 – 29 September 1969
- Preceded by: New seat
- Succeeded by: Division abolished

Personal details
- Born: 15 April 1905 Hawthorn, Victoria, Australia
- Died: 1 December 1984 (aged 79) Melbourne, Victoria, Australia
- Party: Liberal
- Spouse: Winifred Senior (m. 1929)
- Education: University of Melbourne
- Occupation: Pharmaceutical chemist

Sir William Crawford Haworth (15 April 1905 – 1 December 1984) was an Australian politician. He was a member of the House of Representatives from 1949 to 1969, representing the seat of Isaacs for the Liberal Party. He was also a member of the Victorian Legislative Assembly from 1937 to 1945 and briefly served as a state government minister. He was a pharmaceutical chemist before entering parliament and served with the Australian Army during World War II.

== Early life ==
Haworth was born on 15 April 1905 in Hawthorn, Victoria. He attended Essendon High School and was a member of the Mercantile Rowing Club, making the Victorian state team in 1929.

Haworth was a pharmaceutical chemist by profession. After serving an apprenticeship with a chemist and druggist in Fitzroy, he took over a shop in Albert Park in 1926. Haworth was active in the Albert Park branches of the Australian Natives' Association and the Young Nationalists. He served on the South Melbourne City Council from 1932 to 1938 and was chairman of the council of the South Melbourne Technical School from 1939 to 1964.

== State politics ==
Haworth was elected to the Victorian Legislative Assembly at the 1937 state election, representing the seat of Albert Park for the United Australia Party (UAP). He joined the new Liberal Party upon its creation in 1945.

Haworth was interested in housing policy, publishing a proposal for slum clearances. In 1938 he moved a no-confidence motion against Albert Dunstan's Country Party over its record on youth unemployment. Haworth was appointed minister for health and minister for housing in Ian Macfarlan's caretaker ministry in October 1945. He was defeated the following month at the 1945 state election.

=== Military service ===
While still serving as an MP, Haworth enlisted in the Citizen Military Force upon the outbreak of the Second World War and transferred to the Australian Imperial Force in July 1940 with the rank of captain. He served with the 2/23rd Battalion in the North African campaign, including at Tobruk and El Alamein. He was discharged in January 1944.

== Federal politics ==
At the 1949 federal election, Haworth was elected to the newly created seat of Isaacs for the Liberal Party. He was re-elected on seven subsequent elections, retiring at the 1969 election after his seat was abolished in a redistribution.

Haworth served on the Joint Standing Committee on Foreign Affairs from 1959 to 1966. In 1962 he moved a successful motion that antisemitism in the Soviet Union be raised by Australia's delegation to the United Nations, which was used by the Liberal Party as a wedge issue when it was opposed by Jewish senator Sam Cohen of the Australian Labor Party. Haworth was a supporter of Melbourne's Jewish organisations and his knighthood in 1969 was said by the Australian Jewish News to have "met with a great deal of satisfaction in the Jewish community".

Haworth was an unsuccessful candidate to replace John McLeay as speaker of the House of Representatives in 1967. He had previously served as acting speaker on a number of occasions.

== Personal life ==
Haworth died in Melbourne on 1 December 1984, aged 79.

Victorian Legislative Assembly
| Preceded by Harry Drew | Member for Albert Park; 1937–1945 | Succeeded by Frank Crean |
Parliament of Australia
| New division | Member for Isaacs; 1949–1969 | Division abolished |
