= John Bourke (Australian politician) =

Australian politician (1901–1970)

John Peter Bourke QC (30 June 1901 – 19 October 1970) was an Australian politician.

== Biography ==
Born in Chiltern to schoolteacher William Richard Bourke and Mary Anne Clancy, he attended Christian Brothers College in East Melbourne before studying law at Melbourne University, working as a journalist to finance his study. He received a Bachelor of Law and a Master of Arts and was called to the bar in 1925. On 4 April 1931 he married Anastasia Maud Mulcahy. He was elected to the Victorian Legislative Assembly as the Labor member for St Kilda in 1952, and was appointed Queen's Counsel in 1954. Following his defeat in 1955 he returned to law and was a County Court judge from 1959 to 1967. He died in 1970 at Fitzroy.
