= Electoral results for the district of Boroondara =

Australian district election results

This is a list of electoral results for the electoral district of Boroondara in Victorian state elections.

== Members for Boroondara ==
Member	Party	Term
George Smith	Unaligned	1877
Robert Smith	Unaligned	1878–1882
William Walker	Unaligned	1882–1889

A new district, Eastern Suburbs, was created in 1889 covering much of the same area as Boroondara.

Boroondara was re-created in 1904.

Member	Party	Term
Sir Frank Madden	Liberal	1904–1917
Edmund Greenwood	Nationalist	1917–1927
Richard Linton	Nationalist	1927–1931
Richard Linton	UAP	1931–1933
Trevor Oldham	UAP	1933–1945

== Election results ==
=== Elections in the 1940s ===
1943 Victorian state election: Boroondara
Party	Candidate	Votes	%	±%
United Australia	Trevor Oldham	19,517	58.4	−12.0
Independent	Lila Monsbourgh	13,881	41.6	+41.6
Total formal votes		33,398	97.9	−0.3
Informal votes		730	2.1	+0.3
Turnout		34,128	86.9	−5.8
United Australia hold		Swing	N/A	

1940 Victorian state election: Boroondara
Party	Candidate	Votes	%	±%
United Australia	Trevor Oldham	21,921	70.4	−29.6
Independent	Reuben Kefford	9,196	29.6	+29.6
Total formal votes		31,117	98.2	
Informal votes		585	1.8	
Turnout		31,702	92.7	
United Australia hold		Swing		

=== Elections in the 1930s ===
1937 Victorian state election: Boroondara
Party	Candidate	Votes	%	±%
United Australia	Trevor Oldham	unopposed		
United Australia hold		Swing		

1935 Victorian state election: Boroondara
Party	Candidate	Votes	%	±%
United Australia	Trevor Oldham	unopposed		
United Australia hold		Swing		

1933 Boroondara state by-election
Party	Candidate	Votes	%	±%
United Australia	Trevor Oldham	8,068	35.8	
Labor	Muriel Heagney	4,632	20.5	
United Australia	James Nettleton	3,271	14.5	
United Australia	Cedric Pullman	2,610	11.6	
United Australia	Danial Berriman	1,732	7.7	
United Australia	Robert Sylvester	1,550	6.9	
United Australia	James Fowler	686	3.0	
Total formal votes		22,549	95.3	
Informal votes		1,101	4.7	
Turnout		23,650	91.6	
After distribution of preferences
United Australia	Trevor Oldham	11,283	50.0	
United Australia	James Nettleton	5,772	25.6	
Labor	Muriel Heagney	5,494	24.4	
United Australia hold		Swing	N/A	

- Preferences were not fully distributed.

1932 Victorian state election: Boroondara
Party	Candidate	Votes	%	±%
United Australia	Richard Linton	unopposed		
United Australia hold		Swing		

=== Elections in the 1920s ===
1929 Victorian state election: Boroondara
Party	Candidate	Votes	%	±%
Nationalist	Richard Linton	13,881	60.3	+20.6
Labor	Robert Dodman	9,152	39.7	+11.2
Total formal votes		23,033	99.1	+3.0
Informal votes		204	0.9	−3.0
Turnout		23,237	93.6	+0.9
Nationalist hold		Swing	−3.1	

1927 Victorian state election: Boroondara
Party	Candidate	Votes	%	±%
Nationalist	Richard Linton	7,712	39.7	
Labor	Robert Dodman	5,542	28.5	
Independent	David Evans	1,644	8.5	
Ind. Nationalist	Robert Sylvester	1,590	8.2	
Australian Liberal	Victor Ginn	1,573	8.1	
Independent	Louis Holmes	1,375	7.1	
Total formal votes		19,436	96.1	
Informal votes		798	3.9	
Turnout		20,234	92.7	
Two-party-preferred result
Nationalist	Richard Linton	12,125	63.4	
Labor	Robert Dodman	7,311	37.6	
Nationalist hold		Swing		

1924 Victorian state election: Boroondara
Party	Candidate	Votes	%	±%
Nationalist	Edmund Greenwood	17,670	63.1	−36.9
Independent Liberal	Philip Jacobs	10,348	36.9	+36.9
Total formal votes		28,018	99.6	
Informal votes		127	0.4	
Turnout		28,145	44.6	
Nationalist hold		Swing	N/A	

1921 Victorian state election: Boroondara
Party	Candidate	Votes	%	±%
Nationalist	Edmund Greenwood	unopposed		
Nationalist hold		Swing		

1920 Victorian state election: Boroondara
Party	Candidate	Votes	%	±%
Nationalist	Edmund Greenwood	16,885	61.5	+18.6
Nationalist	George Palmer	6,721	24.5	+24.5
Labor	William Wilcock	3,858	14.0	+14.0
Total formal votes		27,464	93.6	−3.2
Informal votes		573	6.4	+3.2
Turnout		29,340	60.5	+14.8
Nationalist hold		Swing	N/A	

=== Elections in the 1910s ===
1917 Victorian state election: Boroondara
Party	Candidate	Votes	%	±%
Nationalist	Edmund Greenwood	7,461	42.9	
Nationalist	Frank Madden	4,839	27.8	
Nationalist	Frederick Francis	2,654	15.2	
Nationalist	Walter Hiscock	2,450	14.1	
Total formal votes		17,404	96.8	−1.5
Informal votes		573	3.2	+1.5
Turnout		17,977	45.7	+6.8
Two-candidate-preferred result
Nationalist	Edmund Greenwood	11,258	66.7	
Nationalist	Frank Madden	6,146	33.3	
Nationalist hold		Swing	N/A	

1914 Victorian state election: Boroondara
Party	Candidate	Votes	%	±%
Liberal	Frank Madden	7,929	69.2	+8.8
Labor	Ralph Charrett	3,537	30.8	+30.8
Total formal votes		11,466	98.3	−1.1
Informal votes		204	1.7	+1.1
Turnout		11,670	38.9	−13.3
Liberal hold		Swing	N/A	

1911 Victorian state election: Boroondara
Party	Candidate	Votes	%	±%
Liberal	Frank Madden	6,096	60.4	+10.2
Independent Liberal	Harold Wilkinson	3,993	39.6	+39.6
Total formal votes		10,089	99.4	−0.2
Informal votes		60	0.6	+0.2
Turnout		10,149	52.2	+10.2
Liberal hold		Swing	N/A	
