= Members of the Victorian Legislative Assembly, 1932–1935 =

- ←1929–1932 1935–1937→

This is a list of members of the Victorian Legislative Assembly from 1932 to 1935, as elected at the 1932 state election.

Name	Party	Electorate	Term in office
John Allan	Country	Rodney	1917–1936
Albert Allnutt	Country	Mildura	1927–1945
Hon Henry Angus ^{[8]}	United Australia	Gunbower	1911–1934
Hon Sir Stanley Argyle	United Australia	Toorak	1920–1940
Edward Austin	United Australia	Geelong	1932–1935
Bill Barry ^{[2]}	Labor	Carlton	1932–1955
Henry Beardmore ^{[3]}	United Australia	Benambra	1917–1932
Matthew Bennett	Country	Gippsland West	1929–1950
Hon Maurice Blackburn ^{[10]}	Labor	Clifton Hill	1914–1917; 1927–1934
Ernie Bond	Independent Labor	Port Fairy and Glenelg	1924–1943
Hon Murray Bourchier	Country	Goulburn Valley	1920–1936
William Boyland ^{[9]}	United Australia	Nunawading	1934–1937
Albert Bussau	Country	Ouyen	1932–1938
John Cain	Labor	Northcote	1917–1957
Edward Cleary	Country	Benalla	1927–1936
Arthur Cook	Labor	Bendigo	1924–1945
Athol Cooper ^{[11]}	United Australia	Dundas	1932
Ted Cotter	Labor	Richmond	1908–1945
Ernest Coyle	United Australia/Country	Waranga	1927–1943
Bert Cremean ^{[10]}	Labor	Clifton Hill	1929–1932; 1934–1945
Lot Diffey	Country	Wangaratta and Ovens	1929–1945
James Dillon	United Australia	Essendon	1932–1943
Harry Drew	United Australia	Albert Park	1932–1937; 1947–1950
Hon Albert Dunstan	Country	Korong and Eaglehawk	1920–1950
John Ellis	United Australia	Prahran	1932–1945
William Everard	United Australia	Evelyn	1917–1950
James Fairbairn ^{[6]}	United Australia	Warrnambool	1932–1933
George Frost	Labor	Maryborough and Daylesford	1920–1942
John Austin Gray	United Australia	Hawthorn	1930–1939
Frank Groves	United Australia	Dandenong	1917–1929; 1932–1937
Tom Hayes	Labor	Melbourne	1924–1955
Hon Edmond Hogan	Independent	Warrenheip and Grenville	1913–1943
Frederick Holden	United Australia	Grant	1932–1950
Jack Holland	Labor	Flemington	1925–1955
Thomas Hollway	United Australia	Ballarat	1932–1955
Col. Hon Wilfrid Kent Hughes	United Australia	Kew	1927–1949
Hon Herbert Hyland	Country	Gippsland South	1929–1970
James Jewell	Labor	Brunswick	1910–1949
Frank Keane	Labor	Coburg	1924–1940
Alfred Kirton	United Australia	Mornington	1932–1947
Brig. George Knox	United Australia	Upper Yarra	1927–1960
Hon John Lemmon	Labor	Williamstown	1904–1955
Albert Lind	Country	Gippsland East	1920–1961
Richard Linton ^{[4]}	United Australia	Boroondara	1927–1933
Harold Luxton	United Australia	Caulfield	1930–1935
Allan McDonald ^{[5]}	United Australia	Polwarth	1933–1940
James McDonald ^{[5]}	United Australia	Polwarth	1917–1933
Hon Ian Macfarlan	United Australia	Brighton	1928–1945
Keith McGarvie ^{[6]}	United Australia	Warrnambool	1933–1935
William McKenzie	Labor	Wonthaggi	1927–1947
Hon Edwin Mackrell	Country	Upper Goulburn	1920–1945
James McLachlan	Independent	Gippsland North	1908–1938
Thomas Maltby	United Australia	Barwon	1929–1961
Chester Manifold	United Australia	Hampden	1929–1935
Hon Norman Martin ^{[8]}	Independent Country/Country	Gunbower	1934–1945
Hon Robert Menzies ^{[9]}	United Australia	Nunawading	1929–1934
Archie Michaelis	United Australia	St Kilda	1932–1952
William Moncur	Country	Walhalla	1927–1945
James Murphy	Labor	Port Melbourne	1917–1942
Francis Old	Country	Swan Hill	1919–1945
Trevor Oldham ^{[4]}	United Australia	Boroondara	1933–1953
Roy Paton ^{[3]}	Country	Benambra	1932–1947
Hon Sir Alexander Peacock ^{[7]}	United Australia	Allandale	1889–1933
Lady Millie Peacock ^{[7]}	United Australia	Allandale	1933–1935
Hon John Pennington	United Australia	Kara Kara and Borung	1913–1917; 1918–1935
Hon George Prendergast	Labor	Footscray	1894–1897; 1900–1926; 1927–1937
Hon Dr Clive Shields	United Australia	Castlemaine and Kyneton	1932–1940
Hon Bill Slater ^{[11]}	Labor	Dundas	1917–1947
James Vinton Smith	Independent UAP/ United Australia ^{[1]}	Oakleigh	1932–1937
Robert Solly ^{[2]}	Labor	Carlton	1904–1906; 1908–1932
Richard Toutcher	United Australia	Stawell and Ararat	1897–1935
Hon Tom Tunnecliffe	Labor	Collingwood	1903–1904; 1907–1920; 1921–1947
Marcus Wettenhall	Country	Lowan	1920–1935
Harry White	United Australia	Bulla and Dalhousie	1932–1943
Henry Zwar	United Australia	Heidelberg	1932–1945

== Notes ==
^{1} Oakleigh MLA James Vinton Smith was elected as an unendorsed UAP candidate after being defeated in preselection, but was immediately admitted to the parliamentary party upon his election.
^{2} Carlton Labor MLA Robert Solly died on 5 June 1932. Labor candidate Bill Barry won the resulting by-election on 9 July 1932.
^{3} Benambra UAP MLA Henry Beardmore died on 29 August 1932. Country Party candidate Roy Paton won the resulting by-election on 15 October 1932.
^{4} Boroondara UAP MLA Richard Linton resigned in March 1933 to take up an appointment as Agent-General for Victoria in London. UAP candidate Trevor Oldham won the resulting by-election on 29 April 1933.
^{5} Polwarth UAP MLA James McDonald died on 15 August 1933. His nephew, Allan McDonald, won the resulting by-election on 16 September 1933.
^{6} Warrnambool UAP MLA James Fairbairn resigned in October 1933 to contest the Flinders federal by-election caused by the resignation of Stanley Bruce. UAP candidate Keith McGarvie won the resulting by-election on 11 November 1933.
^{7} Allandale UAP MLA and former Premier of Victoria Alexander Peacock died on 7 October 1933. His widow Millie Peacock won the resulting by-election for the UAP on 11 November 1933, becoming the first ever woman member of the Victorian Legislative Assembly.
^{8} Gunbower UAP MLA Henry Angus died on 2 April 1934. Independent Country candidate Norman Martin won the resulting by-election on 12 May 1934.
^{9} Nunawading UAP MLA Robert Menzies resigned in July 1934 to contest the seat of Kooyong at the 1934 federal election. UAP candidate William Boyland won the resulting by-election on 1 September 1934.
^{10} Clifton Hill Labor MLA and Speaker of the Assembly Maurice Blackburn resigned in July 1934 to contest the seat of Bourke at the 1934 federal election. Labor candidate Bert Cremean was elected unopposed to fill the vacancy at the close of nominations on 21 September.
^{11} Dundas UAP MLA Athol Cooper was defeated when a recount was ordered for his seat in July 1932.

== Sources ==
- "Find a Member". State Government of Victoria.
