= Third Cain ministry =

57th ministry of Government of Victoria, Australia

- 57th ministry of Victoria, Australia
- Date formed: 17 December, 1952
- Date dissolved: 31 March, 1955

People and organisations
- Monarch: Elizabeth II
- Governor: Sir Dallas Brooks
- Premier: John Cain
- Deputy premier: Bill Galvin
- No. of ministers: 14
- Member party: Labor
- Status in legislature: Majority government
- Opposition party: Liberal and Country
- Opposition leader: Trevor Oldham (until 2 May 1953); Henry Bolte (from 3 June 1953)

History
- Election: 1952 state election
- Predecessor: Second McDonald ministry
- Successor: Bolte ministry

The Third Cain Ministry was the 57th ministry of the Government of Victoria (Australia). It was led by the Premier of Victoria, John Cain of the Labor Party. The ministry was sworn in on 17 December 1952, and resigned on 7 June 1955 when it was succeeded by the Bolte Ministry.

Three members of Cain's cabinet—Les Coleman (Minister of Transport), Bill Barry (Minister of Health) and Tom Hayes (Minister-in-Charge of Housing)—were expelled from the Labor Party on 31 March 1955 during the Australian Labor Party split of 1955 and formed the Australian Labor Party (Anti-Communist). They were replaced in their ministerial roles by Don Ferguson, Val Doube and John Sheehan respectively. Frank Scully, a Minister without Portfolio, was also expelled from the party and the cabinet—he was not replaced.

== Portfolios ==
Minister	Portfolios
John Cain, MLA	Premier; Treasurer
Bill Galvin, MLA	Deputy Premier; Chief Secretary
Les Coleman, MLC	Minister of Transport; Vice-president of the Board of Land and Works
Don Ferguson, MLC (from 31 March 1955)	Minister of Transport; Vice-president of the Board of Land and Works
Bill Slater, MLA	Attorney-General; Minister-in-Charge of Prices; Minister-in-Charge of Immigration
Bill Barry, MLA (until 31 March 1955)	Minister of Health
Val Doube, MLA (from 31 March 1955)	Minister of Health
Clive Stoneham, MLA	Minister of Agriculture; Minister of State Development and Decentralization; Minister of Water Supply; Vice-president of the Board of Land and Works
Tom Hayes, MLA (until 31 March 1955)	Minister-in-Charge of Housing; Minister-in-Charge of Materials
John Sheehan, MLA (from 31 March 1955)	Minister-in-Charge of Housing
Archibald Fraser, MLC	Minister of Labour; Minister of Mines
Ernie Shepherd, MLA	Minister of Education
Robert Holt, MLA	Commissioner of Crown Lands and Survey; Minister of Soldier Settlement; Minister for Conservation; President of the Board of Land and Works
Samuel Merrifield, MLA	Commissioner of Public Works; Vice-president of the Board of Land and Works
John Galbally, MLC	Minister-in-Charge of Electrical Undertakings; Minister for Forests
Joseph Smith, MLA	Ministers without Portfolio
Frank Scully, MLA (until 31 March 1955)	Ministers without Portfolio

== See also ==
- First Cain ministry
- Second Cain ministry

Parliament of Victoria
Preceded by Second McDonald Ministry	Third Cain Ministry; 1952–1955	Succeeded by Bolte Ministry
