= First Hollway ministry =

54th ministry of the Government of Victoria

First Hollway Ministry
- 54th ministry of Victoria, Australia
- Date formed: 20 November 1947
- Date dissolved: 27 June 1950

People and organisations
- Monarch: George VI
- Governor: Sir Winston Dugan (until 20 February 1949); Sir Dallas Brooks (from 18 October 1949) (Note: During the time between the end of Sir Dugan's Governorship and the appointment of Sir Brooks, the Governor was Lieutenant-Governor Sir Edmund Herring)
- Premier: Thomas Hollway
- Deputy premier: John McDonald (until 3 December 1948); Wilfrid Kent Hughes (3 December 1948 to 28 October 1949); Trevor Oldham (from 28 October 1949)
- No. of ministers: 15
- Member party: Liberal–Country Coalition (until 3 December 1948); Liberal and Country (from 3 December 1948)
- Status in legislature: Minority government
- Opposition party: Labor (until 7 December 1948); Country (from 7 December 1948)
- Opposition leaders: John Cain (until 7 December 1948); John McDonald (from 7 December 1948)

History
- Elections: 1947 state election 1950 state election
- Predecessor: Second Cain ministry
- Successor: First McDonald ministry

The First Hollway Ministry was the 54th ministry of the Government of Victoria. It was led by the Premier of Victoria, Thomas Hollway, and consisted of members of the Liberal and Country parties. Hollway led a Liberal-Country coalition until the Country Party ministers resigned on 3 December 1948. He then led an interim Liberal ministry until 8 December, when he formed a full Liberal ministry. The ministry were sworn in on 20 November 1947, 3 December 1948, and 8 December 1948.

== 1st Hollway Ministry I (20 November 1947 to 3 December 1948) ==
Party	Minister	Portfolio
Liberal	Thomas Hollway, MLA	Premier; Treasurer
Country	John McDonald, MLA	Deputy Premier; Commissioner of Crown Lands and Survey; President of the Board of Land and Works; Minister of Water Supply; Minister of Soldier Settlement
Liberal	Wilfrid Kent Hughes, MLA	Minister of Transport; Minister of Public Instruction; Vice-President of the Board of Land and Works
Country	Keith Dodgshun, MLA	Chief Secretary
Liberal	Trevor Oldham, MLA	Attorney-General; Solicitor-General
Country	Albert Dunstan, MLA	Minister of Health
Liberal	Alexander Dennett, MLA	Minister of Agriculture; Minister of Forests; Vice-President of the Board of Land and Works
Liberal	James Kennedy, MLC	Commissioner of Public Works; Vice-President of the Board of Land and Works
Country	John Lienhop, MLC	Minister in charge of Electrical Undertakings; Minister of Mines
Country	Herbert Hyland, MLA	Minister of Labour*; Minister in Charge of State Development*
Liberal	Arthur Warner, MLC	Minister in Charge of Materials; Minister in Charge of Housing*
Country	Percy Byrnes, MLC	Minister without portfolio

* Honorary positions

== 1st Hollway Ministry II (3 December 1948 to 8 December 1948) ==
Minister	Portfolio
Thomas Hollway, MLA	Premier; Treasurer; Commissioner of Crown Lands and Survey; President of the Board of Land and Works; Minister of Water Supply; Minister of Soldier Settlement
Wilfrid Kent Hughes, MLA	Deputy Premier; Minister of Transport; Minister of Public Instruction; Vice-President of the Board of Land and Works; Chief Secretary
Trevor Oldham, MLA	Attorney-General; Solicitor-General; Minister of Health
Alexander Dennett, MLA	Minister of Agriculture; Minister of Forests; Vice-President of the Board of Land and Works; Minister of Labour; Minister of Decentralisation
James Kennedy, MLC	Commissioner of Public Works; Vice-President of the Board of Land and Works; Minister in charge of Electrical Undertakings; Minister of Mines
Arthur Warner, MLC	Minister in Charge of Materials*; Minister in Charge of Housing *

*Honorary positions

== 1st Hollway Ministry III (8 December 1948 to 27 June 1950) ==
Minister	Portfolio
Thomas Hollway, MLA	Premier; Treasurer; Minister of Transport (29 October 1949 to 15 December 1949); Minister in charge of Electrical Undertakings (29 October 1949 to 15 December 1949); Vice-President of the Board of Land and Works (29 October 1949 to 15 December 1949)
Wilfrid Kent Hughes, MLA	Deputy Premier (until 28 October 1949); Minister of Transport; Minister in charge of Electrical Undertakings; Vice-President of the Board of Land and Works (until 29 October 1949)
Trevor Oldham, MLA	Deputy Premier (from 28 October 1949); Attorney-General; Solicitor-General; Chief Secretary (from 19 June 1950)
Alexander Dennett, MLA	Minister of Agriculture; Minister of Forests; Vice-President of the Board of Land and Works (until 15 December 1949)
Sir (Note: Kennedy was knighted in January 1950, during this ministry) James Kennedy, MLC	Commissioner of Public Works
Arthur Warner, MLC	Minister in Charge of Housing (until 19 June 1950); Minister in Charge of Materials (until 19 June 1950); Minister of in Charge of State Development (until 15 December 1949); Minister in charge of Electrical Undertakings (15 December 1949 to 19 June 1950)
William W Leggatt, MLA	Chief Secretary (until 19 June 1950); Commissioner of Crown Lands and Survey (from 19 June 1950); President of the Board of Land and Works (from 19 June 1950); Minister of Soldier Settlement (from 19 June 1950)
Raymond W Tovell, MLA	Minister of Public Instruction
Rutherford Guthrie, MLA (until 19 June 1950)	Commissioner of Crown Lands and Survey; President of the Board of Land and Works; Minister of Soldier Settlement
Henry Bolte, MLA	Minister of Water Supply; Minister of Mines (to 19 June 1950); Minister for Conservation (from 15 December 1949)
Charles P Gartside, MLC	Minister of Health*
Allan McDonald, MLC	Minister of Labour; Minister of State Development (from 15 December 1949)*
Edward Guye, MLA	Minister of Transport (from 15 December 1949); Vice-President of the Board of Land and Works (from 15 December 1949)
John Hipworth, MLA	Minister without Portfolio (from 15 December 1949); Vice-President of the Board of Land and Works (from 15 December 1949)
Sir Thomas Maltby, MLA	Minister in charge of Electrical Undertakings (from 19 June 1950); Minister of Mines (from 19 June 1950)
John Don, MLA	Minister without Portfolio (from 19 June 1950)
Leslie G Norman, MLA	Minister without Portfolio (from 19 June 1950)

* Honorary positions

== Notes ==
Parliament of Victoria
Preceded by Second Cain Ministry	First Hollway Ministry; 1947-1950	Succeeded by First McDonald Ministry
