= Second Cain ministry =

53rd ministry of Victoria, Australia

- 53rd ministry of Victoria, Australia
- Date formed: 21 November 1945
- Date dissolved: 20 November 1947

People and organisations
- Monarch: George VI
- Governor: Sir Winston Dugan
- Premier: John Cain
- Deputy premier: Frank Field
- No. of ministers: 12
- Member party: Labor
- Status in legislature: Minority government
- Opposition party: Liberal–United Country Coalition
- Opposition leader: John McDonald

History
- Election: 1945 state election
- Predecessor: Macfarlan ministry
- Successor: First Hollway ministry

The Second Cain ministry was the 53rd ministry of the Government of Victoria (Australia). It was led by the Premier of Victoria, John Cain of the Labor Party. The ministry was sworn in on 21 November 1945.

== Portfolios ==
Minister	Portfolios
John Cain, MLA	Premier; Treasurer
Frank Field, MLA	Deputy Premier; Minister of Public Instruction
Bill Slater, MLA	Chief Secretary; Attorney-General; Solicitor-General
William McKenzie, MLA	Minister of Agriculture; Minister of Mines; Vice-President of the Board of Land and Works
Bill Barry, MLA	Minister of Health; Minister of Housing; Minister of Forests
Clive Stoneham, MLA	Minister of Transport; Minister of State Development and Decentralization; Vice-President of the Board of Land and Works
Bill Galvin, MLA	President of the Board of Land and Works; Commissioner of Crown Lands and Survey; Minister of Water Supply
Percy Clarey, MLC	Minister of Labour; Minister of Employment
Pat Kennelly, MLC	Commissioner of Public Works; Minister in Charge of Electrical Undertakings; Vice-President of the Board of Land and Works
Tom Hayes, MLA	Ministers without Portfolio
Archibald Fraser, MLC	Ministers without Portfolio
Les Coleman, MLC	Ministers without Portfolio

== See also ==
- First Cain ministry
- Third Cain ministry

Parliament of Victoria
Preceded by Macfarlan Ministry	Second Cain Ministry; 1945–1947	Succeeded by First Hollway Ministry
