= Electoral results for the district of Goulburn Valley =

Victoria, Australia, district election results

This is a list of electoral results for the electoral district of Goulburn Valley in Victorian state elections.

== Members for Goulburn Valley ==
Member	Party	Term
George Graham		1904–1914
John Mitchell	Fusion Liberal	1914–1916
John Mitchell	Nationalist	1916–1920
Sir Murray Bourchier	Farmers Union	1920–1922
Sir Murray Bourchier	Country	1922–1936
John McDonald	Country	1936–1945

== Election results ==
=== Elections in the 1940s ===
1943 Victorian state election: Goulburn Valley
Party	Candidate	Votes	%	±%
Country	John McDonald	unopposed		
Country hold		Swing		

1940 Victorian state election: Goulburn Valley
Party	Candidate	Votes	%	±%
Country	John McDonald	unopposed		
Country hold		Swing		

=== Elections in the 1930s ===
1937 Victorian state election: Goulburn Valley
Party	Candidate	Votes	%	±%
Country	John McDonald	unopposed		
Country hold		Swing		

1936 Goulburn Valley state by-election
Party	Candidate	Votes	%	±%
Country	John McDonald	5,526	50.6	−49.4
Country	William Moss	2,666	24.4	+24.4
Country	Patrick O'Hanlon	1,398	12.8	+12.8
Country	Robert Gordon	1,328	12.2	+12.2
Total formal votes		10,918	98.4	
Informal votes		175	1.6	
Turnout		11,093	90.8	
Country hold		Swing	N/A	

- Preferences were not distributed.

1935 Victorian state election: Goulburn Valley
Party	Candidate	Votes	%	±%
Country	Murray Bourchier	unopposed		
Country hold		Swing		

1932 Victorian state election: Goulburn Valley
Party	Candidate	Votes	%	±%
Country	Murray Bourchier	unopposed		
Country hold		Swing		

=== Elections in the 1920s ===
1929 Victorian state election: Goulburn Valley
Party	Candidate	Votes	%	±%
Country	Murray Bourchier	unopposed		
Country hold		Swing		

1927 Victorian state election: Goulburn Valley
Party	Candidate	Votes	%	±%
Country	Murray Bourchier	unopposed		
Country hold		Swing		

1924 Victorian state election: Goulburn Valley
Party	Candidate	Votes	%	±%
Country	Murray Bourchier	unopposed		
Country hold		Swing		

1921 Victorian state election: Goulburn Valley
Party	Candidate	Votes	%	±%
Victorian Farmers	Murray Bourchier	3,482	53.0	+2.5
Nationalist	John Mitchell	3,089	47.0	−2.5
Total formal votes		6,571	99.5	+4.7
Informal votes		33	0.5	−4.7
Turnout		6,604	74.5	+5.2
Victorian Farmers hold		Swing	+2.5	

1920 Victorian state election: Goulburn Valley
Party	Candidate	Votes	%	±%
Victorian Farmers	Murray Bourchier	2,878	50.5	+50.5
Nationalist	John Mitchell	2,818	49.5	−18.3
Total formal votes		5,696	94.8	−0.4
Informal votes		313	5.2	+0.4
Turnout		6,009	69.3	+26.0
Victorian Farmers gain from Nationalist		Swing	N/A	

=== Elections in the 1910s ===
1917 Victorian state election: Goulburn Valley
Party	Candidate	Votes	%	±%
Nationalist	John Mitchell	2,432	67.8	+30.3
Nationalist	Thomas Lyons	1,555	32.2	+11.7
Total formal votes		3,497	95.2	−3.2
Informal votes		181	4.8	+3.2
Turnout		3,768	43.3	−15.6
Nationalist hold		Swing	N/A	

1914 Victorian state election: Goulburn Valley
Party	Candidate	Votes	%	±%
Liberal	John Mitchell	2,001	37.5	
Liberal	Patrick O'Hanlon	1,427	26.7	
Liberal	Thomas Lyons	1,094	20.5	
Liberal	Alexander McClelland	815	15.3	
Total formal votes		5,337	98.4	
Informal votes		86	1.6	
Turnout		5,423	58.9	
Two-candidate-preferred result
Liberal	John Mitchell	3,366	63.1	
Liberal	Patrick O'Hanlon	1,971	36.9	
Liberal hold		Swing	N/A	

1911 Victorian state election: Goulburn Valley
Party	Candidate	Votes	%	±%
Liberal	John Mitchell	unopposed		
Liberal hold		Swing		
