= Second Hollway ministry =

56th ministry of the Government of Victoria, Australia

- 56th ministry of Victoria, Australia
- Date formed: 28 October 1952
- Date dissolved: 31 October 1952

People and organisations
- Monarch: Elizabeth II
- Governor: Sir Dallas Brooks
- Premier: Thomas Hollway
- Deputy premier: Alexander Dennett
- No. of ministers: 8
- Member party: Electoral Reform League
- Status in legislature: Minority government
- Opposition party: Labor
- Opposition leader: John Cain

History
- Predecessor: First McDonald ministry
- Successor: Second McDonald ministry

The Second Hollway Ministry was the 56th ministry of the Government of Victoria. It was led by the Premier of Victoria, Thomas Hollway and Deputy Premier Alexander Dennett. Hollway and the rest of the ministry were not aligned to a political party at the time, although they would later form the Electoral Reform League to contest the December 1952 election, and had been recently expelled from the parliamentary Liberal and Country Party. With the help of two Hollway supporters in the Victorian Legislative Council, the Labor Party blocked supply to John McDonald's Country Party government, and indicated that they would support Hollway as Premier.

The ministry was the shortest-lived ministry in Victoria's political history, lasting only seventy hours. The cabinet was sworn in at noon on 28 October 1952, but was ordered to resign on the morning of 31 October after Hollway's request to the Governor of Victoria for a dissolution of parliament was refused. John McDonald was asked to re-form a government, and an election was called for 6 December.

== Portfolios ==
| Minister | Portfolios |
|---|---|
| Thomas Hollway, MLA | Premier; Treasurer; Attorney-General |
| Alexander Dennett, MLA | Deputy Premier; Chief Secretary; Minister of Forests; Minister for Conservation; Minister-in-Charge of Immigration |
| Charles Gartside, MLC | Commissioner of Public Works; Minister-in-Charge of Prices |
| Raymond Tovell, MLA | Minister of Education; Minister-in-Charge of Electrical Undertakings |
| John Hipworth, MLA | Commissioner of Crown Lands and Survey; President of the Board of Land and Works; Minister of Soldier Settlement; Minister of Water Supply |
| John Don, MLA | Minister of Transport; Minister of Labour; Vice-President of the Board of Land and Works |
| William Dawnay-Mould, MLA | Minister of Health; Minister-in-Charge of Housing; Minister-in-Charge of Materials; Minister of Mines |
| Hugh MacLeod, MLC | Minister of Agriculture; Minister of State Development; Vice-President of the Board of Land and Works |

Parliament of Victoria
| Preceded by First McDonald Ministry | Second Hollway Ministry; 1952 | Succeeded by Second McDonald Ministry |
