= 1936 Goulburn Valley state by-election =

- 19 September 1936

Electoral district of Goulburn Valley in the Victorian Legislative Assembly
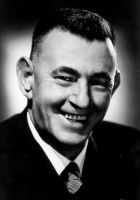

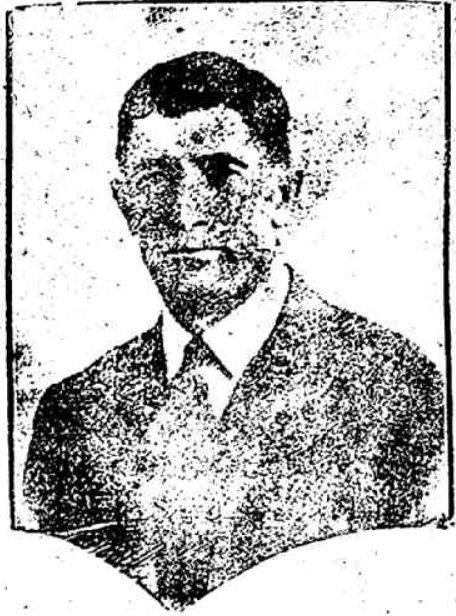

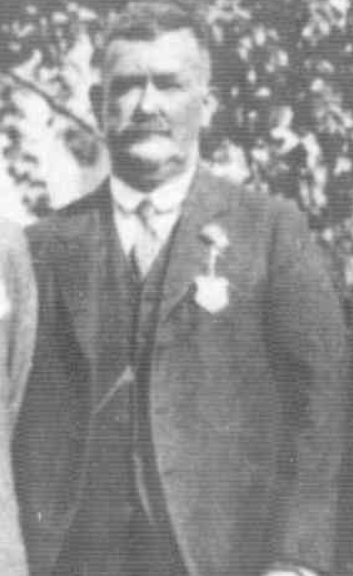

| | First party | Second party | Third party |
|---|---|---|---|
| Candidate | John McDonald | William Moss | Patrick O'Hanlon |
| Party | United Country | United Country | United Country |
| Primary vote | 5,526 | 2,666 | 1,398 |
| Percentage | 50.6% | 24.4% | 12.8% |
| | Fourth party |
| Candidate | Robert Gordon |
| Party | United Country |
| Primary vote | 1,328 |
| Percentage | 12.2% |
MP before election
Murray Bourchier
United Country
Elected MP
John McDonald
United Country

The 1936 Goulburn Valley state by-election was held on 19 September 1936 to elect the member for Goulburn Valley in the Victorian Legislative Assembly, following the appointment of sitting member Murray Bourchier as Agent-General for Victoria in London. Future Premier of Victoria John McDonald was elected.

== Candidates ==
| Party | Candidate | Background |
|---|---|---|
| United Country | John McDonald | Former Councillor of the Shire of Shepparton for West Riding |
| United Country | William Moss | Councillor of the Shire of Numurkah, Vice-president of the Victorian Wheat Growers' Association |
| United Country | Patrick O'Hanlon | President of the Shire of Numurkah |
| United Country | Robert Gordon | Councillor of the Shire of Numurkah |

== Results ==
1936 Goulburn Valley state by-election
| Party | Candidate | Votes | % | ±% |
|---|---|---|---|---|
| Country | John McDonald | 5,526 | 50.6 | −49.4 |
| Country | William Moss | 2,666 | 24.4 | +24.4 |
| Country | Patrick O'Hanlon | 1,398 | 12.8 | +12.8 |
| Country | Robert Gordon | 1,328 | 12.2 | +12.2 |
| Total formal votes | | 10,918 | 98.4 | |
| Informal votes | | 175 | 1.6 | |
| Turnout | | 11,093 | 90.8 | |
| Country hold | | Swing | N/A | |

- Preferences were not distributed.

== See also ==
- List of Victorian state by-elections
- Electoral results for the district of Goulburn Valley
