= First McDonald ministry =

Ministry of the Government of Victoria

- 55th ministry of Victoria, Australia
- Date formed: 27 June 1950
- Date dissolved: 28 October 1952

People and organisations
- Monarch: George VI (until 6 February 1952); Elizabeth II (from 6 February 1952)
- Governor: Sir Dallas Brooks
- Premier: John McDonald
- Deputy premier: Keith Dodgshun
- No. of ministers: 12
- Member party: Country
- Status in legislature: Minority government
- Opposition party: Liberal and Country (until 23 July 1952); Labor (from 23 July 1952)
- Opposition leader: Thomas Hollway (until 5 December 1951); Les Norman (5 December 1951 to 23 July 1952); John Cain (from 23 July 1952)

History
- Predecessor: First Hollway ministry
- Successor: Second Hollway ministry

The First McDonald Ministry was the 55th ministry of the Government of Victoria. It was led by the Premier of Victoria, John McDonald, and consisted of members of the Country Party. The ministry was sworn in on 27 June 1950.

Minister	Portfolio
John McDonald, MLA	Premier; Treasurer
Keith Dodgshun, MLA	Deputy Premier; Chief Secretary; Minister in charge of Electrical Undertakings; Minister in charge of Immigration
Sir Albert E Lind, MLA	Commissioner of Crown Lands and Survey; President of the Board of Land and Works; Minister of Soldier Settlement; Minister of Forests
Sir Herbert Hyland, MLA	Minister of Transport; Minister of State Development; Minister in charge of Prices; Vice-President of the Board of Land and Works
Percy Byrnes, MLC	Commissioner of Public Works; Vice-President of the Board of Land and Works
Percival Inchbold, MLC	Minister of Education
George Moss, MLA	Minister of Agriculture; Minister of Mines; Vice-President of the Board of Land and Works
Richard Brose, MLA	Minister of Water Supply; Minister for Conservation
William Fulton, MLA	Minister of Health
Thomas Mitchell, MLA	Attorney-General; Solicitor-General
Ivan Swinburne, MLC	Minister in Charge of Housing*; Minister in Charge of Materials*
Trevor Harvey, MLC	Minister of Labour*

*Honorary positions until 11 December 1950

Parliament of Victoria
Preceded by First Hollway Ministry	First McDonald Ministry; 1950-1952	Succeeded by Second Hollway Ministry
