= Macdonald ministry =

Macdonald, MacDonald, or McDonald ministry may refer to:

John A. Macdonald's terms as Prime Minister of Canada :

- 1st Canadian Ministry, the Canadian government led by John A. Macdonald from 1867 to 1873
- 3rd Canadian Ministry, the Canadian government led by John A. Macdonald from 1878 to 1891

John Sandfield Macdonald's term as Premier of Ontario :

- John Sandfield Macdonald ministry, the Ontario government led by John Sandfield Macdonald from 1867 to 1871

Ramsay MacDonald's terms as Prime Minister of the United Kingdom :

- First MacDonald ministry, the British minority government led by Ramsay MacDonald from January to November 1924
- Second MacDonald ministry, the British minority government led by Ramsay MacDonald from 1929 to 1931
- Third MacDonald ministry, the British coalition government led by Ramsay MacDonald from August to October 1931
- Fourth MacDonald ministry, the British coalition government led by Ramsay MacDonald from 1931 to 1935

John McDonald's terms as Premier of Victoria :

- First McDonald ministry, the Victoria government led by John McDonald from 1950 to 1952
- Second McDonald ministry, the Victoria government led by John McDonald from October to December 1952

== See also ==
- National Government (United Kingdom)
