= Second McDonald ministry =

58th ministry of the Government of Victoria

- 58th ministry of Victoria, Australia
- Date formed: 31 October 1952
- Date dissolved: 17 December 1952

People and organisations
- Monarch: Elizabeth II
- Governor: Sir Dallas Brooks
- Premier: John McDonald
- Deputy premier: Keith Dodgshun
- No. of ministers: 13
- Member party: Country
- Status in legislature: Minority government
- Opposition party: Labor
- Opposition leader: John Cain

History
- Predecessor: Second Hollway ministry
- Successor: Third Cain ministry

The Second McDonald Ministry was the 58th ministry of the Government of Victoria, which consisted of members of the Country Party. It was led by the Premier of Victoria, John McDonald, and Deputy Premier Keith Dodgshun.

The ministry was formed when the Governor of Victoria, Sir Dallas Brooks, asked McDonald to form an interim government after dismissing the ministry of Thomas Hollway's electoral reform group which had been in government for just seventy hours, and calling an election. McDonald's government was also short-lived, lasting 47 days (31 October to 17 December 1952) until it was defeated at the state election in December by the Labor Party under John Cain.

== Portfolios ==
Minister	Portfolios
John McDonald, MLA	Premier; Treasurer
Keith Dodgshun, MLA	Deputy Premier; Chief Secretary; Minister-in-Charge of Electrical Undertakings; Minister-in-Charge of Immigration
Sir Albert Lind, MLA	Commissioner of Crown Lands and Survey; President of the Board of Land and Works; Minister of Soldier Settlement; Minister of Forests
Sir Herbert Hyland, MLA	Minister of Transport; Minister-in-Charge of Prices; Vice-President of the Board of Land and Works
Percy Byrnes, MLC	Commissioner of Public Works; Vice-President of the Board of Land and Works
Percival Inchbold, MLC	Minister of Education
George Moss, MLA	Minister of Agriculture; Minister of Mines; Vice-President of the Board of Land and Works
Richard Brose, MLA	Minister of Water Supply; Minister of Conservation
Bill Fulton, MLA	Minister of Health
Tom Mitchell, MLA	Attorney-General
Ivan Swinburne, MLC	Minister-in-Charge of Housing; Minister-in-Charge of Materials
Trevor Harvey, MLC	Minister of Labour
Russell White, MLA	Minister of State Development

Parliament of Victoria
Preceded by Second Hollway Ministry	Second McDonald Ministry; 1952	Succeeded by Third Cain Ministry
