= Electoral district of Eastern Suburbs =

Electoral district of Eastern Suburbs may refer to:

- Electoral district of Eastern Suburbs (New South Wales)
- Electoral district of Eastern Suburbs (Victoria)
