= Minister for Transport and Infrastructure =

Minister for Transport and Infrastructure may refer to:

- Minister for Infrastructure and Transport (Australia)
- Minister for Transport and Infrastructure (New South Wales), a former position in the Government of New South Wales, Australia
- Minister for Transport and Infrastructure (Scotland), a former position in the Scottish Government
- Minister for Transport and Infrastructure (Victoria), a position in the Cabinet of Victoria, Australia
- Minister of Infrastructure and Transport (Italy)
- Minister of Transport and Infrastructure (Romania)
