= Minister for Conservation =

Minister for the Conservation of Victoria
- Victorian coat of arms

- Flag of Victoria
- Style: The Honourable
- Member of: Parliament; Executive council
- Reports to: Premier
- Nominator: Premier
- Appointer: Governor on the recommendation of the premier
- Term length: At the governor's pleasure
- Inaugural holder: Henry Bolte MP
- Formation: 15 December 1949
- Final holder: Sherryl Garbutt MP
- Abolished: 5 December 2002
- Succession: Minister for the Environment

The Minister for the Conservation was a minister within the Executive Council of Victoria.

The portfolio's roles have since been taken over by the Minister for the Environment.

== Ministers ==
Order	Minister	Party affiliation	Ministerial title	Term start	Term end	Time in office	Notes
1	Henry Bolte MP	Liberal	Minister for Conservation	15 December 1949	27 June 1950	194 days	
2	Richard Brose MP	Country	Minister for Conservation	27 June 1950	28 October 1952	2 years, 123 days	
3	Alexander Dennett MP	Electoral Reform	Minister for Conservation	28 October 1952	31 October 1952	3 days	
(2)	Richard Brose MP	Country	Minister for Conservation	31 October 1952	17 December 1952	47 days	
4	Robert Holt MP	Labor	Minister for Conservation	17 December 1952	15 December 1953	363 days	
5	Joseph Smith MP	Labor	Minister for Conservation	22 December 1953	7 June 1955	1 year, 167 days	
(1)	Henry Bolte MP	Liberal	Minister for Conservation	7 June 1955	26 July 1961	6 years, 49 days	
6	Keith Turnbull MP	Liberal	Minister for Conservation	26 July 1961	27 June 1964	2 years, 337 days	
7	James Balfour MP	Liberal	Minister for Conservation	27 June 1964	9 May 1967	2 years, 316 days	
8	William McDonald MP	Liberal	Minister for Conservation	9 May 1967	11 June 1970	3 years, 33 days	
9	William Borthwick MP	Liberal	Minister for Conservation	11 June 1970	16 May 1979	8 years, 339 days	
10	Vasey Houghton MLC	Liberal	Minister for Conservation	16 May 1979	8 April 1982	2 years, 327 days	
11	Evan Walker MLC	Labor	Minister for Conservation	8 April 1982	1 September 1983	1 year, 146 days	
12	Rod Mackenzie MLC	Labor	Minister for Conservation, Forests and Lands	1 September 1983	2 May 1985	1 year, 243 days	
13	Joan Kirner MLC	Labor	Minister for Conservation, Forests and Lands	2 May 1985	13 October 1988	3 years, 164 days	
14	Kay Setches MP	Labor	Minister for Conservation, Forests and Lands	13 October 1988	10 August 1990	1 year, 301 days	
15	Steven Crabb MP	Labor	Minister for Conservation and Environment	10 August 1990	28 January 1992	1 year, 171 days	
16	Barry Pullen MLC	Labor	Minister for Conservation and Environment	28 January 1992	6 October 1992	252 days	
17	Mark Birrell MLC	Liberal	Minister for Conservation and Environment	6 October 1992	3 April 1996	3 years, 180 days	
18	Marie Tehan MP	Liberal	Minister for Conservation and Land Management	3 April 1996	20 October 1999	3 years, 200 days	
19	Sherryl Garbutt MP	Labor	Minister for Environment and Conservation	20 October 1999	5 December 2002	3 years, 46 days	
