= Electoral district of Boroondara =

Former state electoral district of Victoria, Australia

Boroondara Victoria—Legislative Assembly
- State: Victoria
- Dates current: 1877–1889, 1904–1945
- Demographic: Metropolitan
- Coordinates: 37°49′00″S 145°03′30″E

Boroondara was an electoral district of the Legislative Assembly in the Australian state of Victoria from 1877 to 1889 and 1904 to 1945. It included the eastern Melbourne suburbs of Kew, Camberwell and Hawthorn.

== Members ==
Member	Party	Term
George Smith	Unaligned	1877
Robert Smith	Unaligned	1878–1882
William Walker	Unaligned	1882–1889

A new district, Eastern Suburbs, was created in 1889 covering much of the same area as Boroondara.

Boroondara was re-created in 1904.

Member	Party	Term
Sir Frank Madden	Liberal	1904–1917
Edmund Greenwood	Nationalist	1917–1927
Richard Linton	Nationalist	1927–1931
Richard Linton	UAP	1931–1933
Trevor Oldham	UAP	1933–1945
