= Edmund Greenwood =

Australian politician

Edmund Wilson Greenwood (21 September 1881 – 7 September 1948) was an Australian politician.

Greenwood was born in Campbelltown in Tasmania to Methodist minister Henry Greenwood and Caroline Jane Tuckfield. The family moved to Victoria around 1890, and Greenwood became an office boy and from 1897 a farm labourer. He suffered an accident in 1902 and returned to Melbourne, becoming a commercial traveller. From 1904 he ran a tent manufacturing firm, which eventually expanded to become a large softgoods warehouse. On 6 February 1906 he married Myra Frances Burchett, with whom he had seven children.

In 1917 Greenwood was elected to the Victorian Legislative Assembly for Boroondara; he was considered a Nationalist, but never sought formal party endorsement. He continued in the Assembly, transferring to Nunawading in April 1927, until he retired to allow Robert Menzies to run for a lower house seat in 1929. Greenwood died in Richmond in 1948.

Victorian Legislative Assembly
Preceded by Sir Frank Madden	Member for Boroondara; 1917–1927	Succeeded by Richard Linton
New seat	Member for Nunawading; 1927–1929	Succeeded by Robert Menzies
