= John Mitchell (Australian politician) =

Australian politician (1869–1943)

John Davidson Mitchell (5 November 1869 – 26 February 1943) was an Australian politician.

He was born near Glenlyon to farmer John Mitchell and Ellen Davidson. He was a farmer at North Mooroopna before becoming a builder in Shepparton. Around 1897 he married Annie Maria Meaklim, with whom he had five children. From 1907 to 1916 he served on Shepparton Shire Council and was president from 1912 to 1913. He was elected to the Victorian Legislative Assembly for Goulburn Valley in 1914 and served as a backbench Liberal and Nationalist until his defeat in 1920. He unsuccessfully contested Goulburn Valley again in 1921, and served on Shepparton Council again from 1927 to 1929. Mitchell died in Shepparton in 1943.

Victorian Legislative Assembly
Preceded by George Graham	Member for Goulburn Valley; 1914–1920	Succeeded by Murray Bourchier
