= Muriel Agnes Heagney =

Australian trade unionist and feminist (1885–1974)

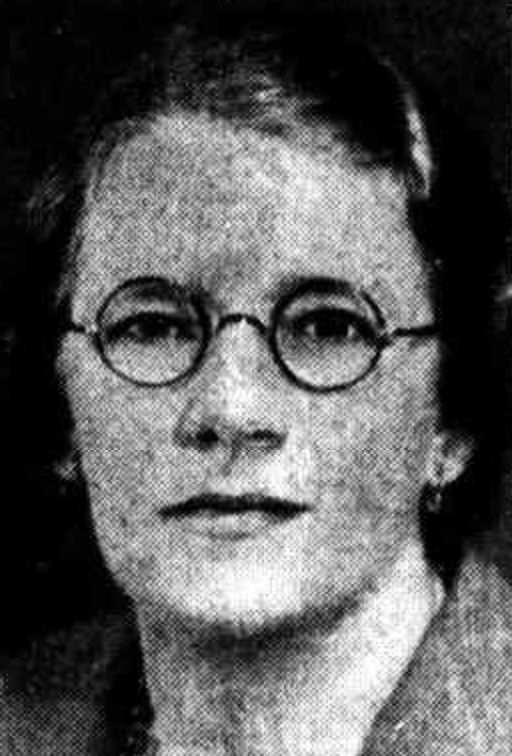
- Muriel Heagney in 1941
- Born: 31 December 1885; Brisbane, Queensland, Australia
- Died: 14 May 1974 (aged 88); St Kilda, Victoria, Australia
- Notable work: Are Women Taking Men's Jobs? (1935)
- Political party: Australian Labor Party
- Movement: Equal Pay

Muriel Agnes Heagney (31 December 1885 – 14 May 1974) was an Australian trade unionist and feminist. For many years she campaigned for equal pay for women. She wrote a number of books on gender equality.

== Early life ==
Heagney was born to Annie Agnes Heagney née Curry, and Patrick Reginal Heagney in Brisbane, Queensland on 31 December 1885. Her family was aligned to the Labor politics, with her maternal grandfather being friends with Peter Lalor, and her father was a member of the Australian Workers' Union, and contributed to The Bulletin, and The Worker, and when the family moved to Victoria, founded the Richmond branch of the Political Labor Council.

Heagney undertook her schooling at a Richmond, and she did her teacher's training to become a primary school teacher.

== Political activism ==
Heagney was a member of the Political Labor Council in Richmond, Victoria and attended the first Victorian Labor Women's Conference in 1909. During World War I she campaigned against conscription and was a committee member of the Workers' Educational Association.

The predominant cause Heagney fought to achieve was equal pay for women.

Between 1921 and 1923 she was the Secretary for the Australian Relief Fund for Stricken Europe and in the following two years visited Russia and worked for a short period in Geneva for the International Labour Organisation. In 1925 she attended the first British Commonwealth Labour Conference in London, representing the Melbourne Trades Hall Council.

Between 1926 and 1927 she was a member of the Australian Labor Party, helping to establish the Labor Guild of Youth, and stood unsuccessfully in the Boroondara by-election in 1933. and a lifetime campaigner for equal pay for women workers.

Heagney began writing a history of the Labor movement. However, her application for the Commonwealth Literary Fund grant was unsuccessful, and she discontinued.

== Death and legacy ==
Heagney died on 14 May 1974 in St Kilda, she was living in poverty.

A week prior to her death, the National Wage Case decision had granted women minimum adult wage equal to men. This result was the culmination of Heagney, and other activists such as Edna Ryan, campaigning for equal pay over many years.

In 1978 a street in the Canberra suburb of Chisholm was named 'Heagney Crescent' in her honour.

In 2001 Heagney was inducted into the Victorian Honour Roll of Women.

Heagney's archives, including drafts and research notes relating to the books she had published, and the books she had planned to write, are held at the State Library Victoria.

== Notable works ==
- Are Women Taking Men's Jobs? (1935)
- Equal Pay for the Sexes (1948)
- Arbitration at the Cross Roads (1954)
