= Electoral district of Eastern Suburbs (Victoria) =

Colonial/state electoral district of Victoria, Australia

Eastern Suburbs Victoria—Legislative Assembly
- State: Victoria
- Created: 1889
- Abolished: 1904
- Demographic: Metropolitan

Electoral district of Eastern Suburbs was an electoral district of the Legislative Assembly in the Australian state of Victoria. It included the eastern Melbourne suburbs of Kew, Camberwell, Balwyn, Hartwell, Caulfield East and Malvern East.

The district was created after the Electoral district of Boroondara, which included some of the same area, was abolished in 1889.

== Members for Eastern Suburbs ==
| Member | Party | Term |
|---|---|---|
| Duncan Gillies | Unaligned | 1889–1894 |
| Sir Frank Madden | Unaligned | 1894–1904 |
