= Murray Bourchier =

Australian politician

Brigadier The Honourable Sir Murray Bourchier CMG, DSO, VD
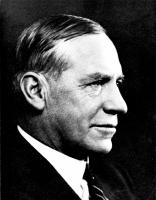

5th Deputy Premier of Victoria
- In office 2 April 1935 – 24 June 1936
- Preceded by: Wilfrid Kent Hughes
- Succeeded by: Francis Old
- Constituency: Goulbourn Valley

Personal details
- Born: 4 April 1881 Pootilla, Bungaree, Victoria
- Died: 16 December 1937 (aged 56) London, England, United Kingdom
- Party: Country Party
- Spouse: Minona Madden
- Children: 3
- Profession: Grazier, soldier

Brigadier Sir Murray William James Bourchier, CMG, DSO, VD (4 April 1881 – 16 December 1937) was an Australian soldier and politician. He was Deputy Premier of Victoria from April 1935 until June 1936.

== Early life ==
Murray was the eldest son of Edward and Francis Bourchier, owners of the Woodland Park property near Strathmerton, Victoria. He was educated privately in Melbourne and afterwards worked at Woodland Park.

== Military career ==
=== World War I ===
Bourchier commanded a CMF light horse troop at Numurkah, Victoria from 1909 to 1914. At the outbreak of World War I he was commissioned into the 4th Light Horse Regiment and left with the first contingent of the First Australian Imperial Force. He served with the regiment in the Gallipoli, Egyptian, Sinai, Palestine and Syrian campaigns.

While on Gallipoli he was appointed temporary captain on 1 July 1915 and adjutant of the 4th Light Horse Regiment on 7 September. He became the acting commander of "A" Squadron on 19 October 1915 and gained his substantive captaincy on 22 November. He was promoted to major on 20 January 1916. The recommendation for promotion noted that "he was always quite cool and collected, and this had a very good effect upon his men". He assumed full command of "A" Squadron on 1 February 1916.

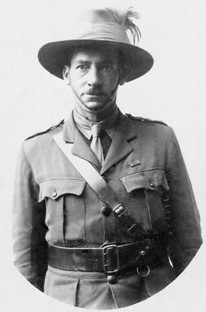
Lieutenant Colonel Murray Bourchier. Official portrait taken in Palestine c.1917

Bourchier was promoted to lieutenant colonel on 15 March 1917 and took command of the 4th Light Horse Regiment. On 31 October 1917 he led the 4th and 12th Regiments in the four-mile charge against Turkish positions at the Battle of Beersheba, capturing 15 of the 17 wells intact and taking over 700 prisoners. In a later report he summed up the effect of the attack:

In commenting on the attack I consider that the success was due to the rapidity with which the movement was carried out. Owing to the volume of fire brought to bear from the enemy's position by Machine Guns and rifles, a dismounted attack would have resulted in a much greater number of casualties. It was noticed also that the morale of the enemy was greatly shaken through our troops galloping over his positions thereby causing his riflemen and machine gunners to lose all control of fire discipline. When the troops came within short range of the trenches the enemy seemed to direct almost all his fire at the horses.

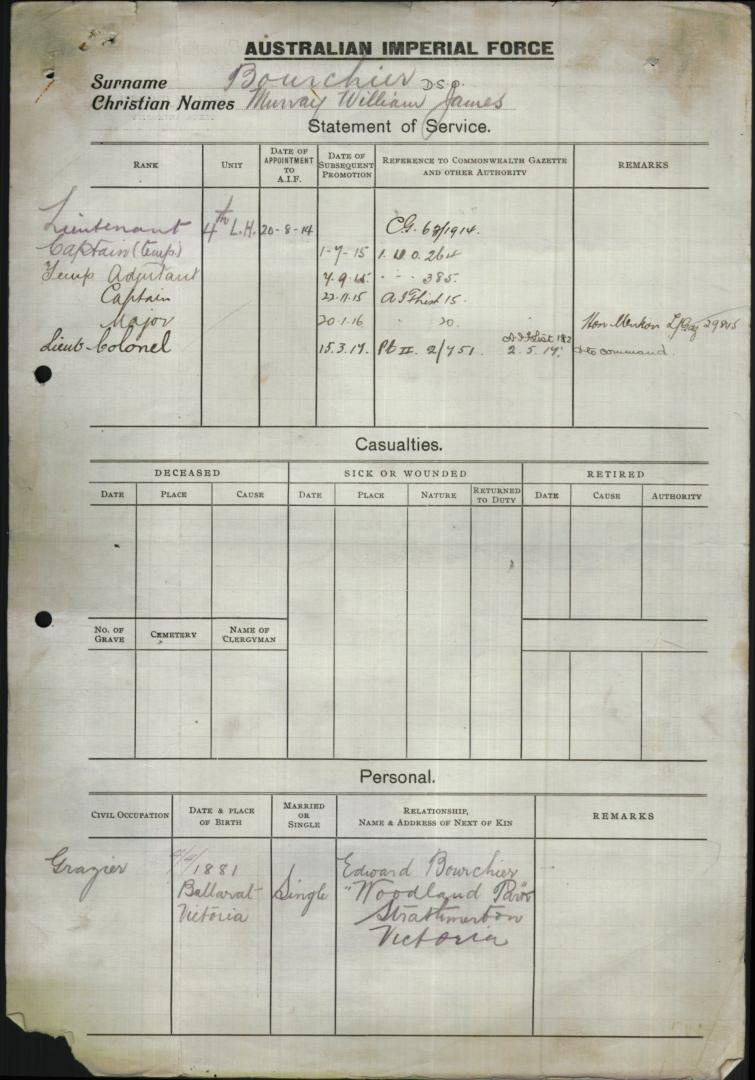
Statement of Service from the National Archives of Australia

He received the Distinguished Service Order on 4 November 1917:

For the gallant and capable manner in which as Commanding Officer of the 4th Australian Light Horse regiment he personally directed his Regiment into action on the attack on BEERSHEBA on 31 October 1917. This officer, by his skilful handling of his Regiment and by his magnificent example of courage and determination, was very largely instrumental in the success of the attack and capture of the town.

In September 1918 Bourchier again commanded a joint force of the 4th and 12th Regiments ("Bourchier's Force") in the final advance on Damascus, capturing 12,000 Turks. He was awarded the Companion of the Order of St Michael and St George on 3 June 1919 for the following recommendation:

In the face of a very heavy fire this officer led his regiment on 27 Sept. across the JORDAN below JISR BENAT YAKUB over a very difficult crossing and thus outflanked the enemy and compelled his to withdraw from the position. On 30 Sept. this officer was in command of the 4th and 12th A.L.H. [Light Horse] Regiments which formed the advanced guard of the [Australian Mounted] Division in its advance from SASA to DAMASCUS. He captured the enemy's position at KAUKAB by a spirited mounted charge of two Regiments without any delay and thus opened the way to DAMASCUS where his troops were the first to enter.

He took temporary command of 4th Light Horse Brigade in November–December 1918 while Brigadier William Grant was in temporary command of the ANZAC Mounted Division. During the war he was mentioned in dispatches three times. The regiment returned to Australia in June 1919.

=== Post war ===
After the war Bourchier returned to his farm near Strathmerton, Victoria. He remained an officer in the Australian Citizens Military Forces, becoming colonel in command of the 5th Cavalry Brigade in 1921 and Brigadier in command of the 2nd Cavalry Division in 1931.

== Political career ==
Bourchier was elected to the Victorian Legislative Assembly in 1920, representing the Victorian Farmers' Union in the electoral district of Goulburn Valley. His maiden speech was an attack on the Lawson government's neglect of ex-servicemen.

He was re-elected as a Country Party candidate in 1921 and re-elected (unopposed) several times until his resignation in 1936. He was deputy leader of the Country Party in 1927–1930, leader in 1933–1935 and deputy leader again in 1935–1936. During his political career he served as Minister of Agriculture and Markets in the Allan government and the Chief Secretary, Minister of Labour and Deputy Premier of Victoria in the early years of the Dunstan government.

He resigned from Parliament in August 1936 and was appointed Victorian Agent-General. While in this position he represented Victoria at the coronation of King George VI and Queen Elizabeth. He died in London from pernicious anaemia and cancer on 16 December 1937. He was knighted posthumously in January 1938.

== Personal life ==
Of Irish Protestant descent, the Bourchier surname is of Anglo-Norman origin. He was also a Freemason. He married Minona Francis Madden, daughter of politician Sir Frank Madden, on 16 June 1921. They had a daughter and two sons.

== Legacy ==
Bourchier Street in Shepparton, Victoria, is named after Lieutenant Colonel Bourchier. Bourchier Street Primary School also recognises the contribution he made with a memorial plaque in its front office. In the 1987 film The Lighthorsemen and a 1993 episode of The Young Indiana Jones Chronicles, both depicting the Battle of Beersheba, Bourchier was portrayed by Tony Bonner.

Victorian Legislative Assembly
| Preceded by John Mitchell | Member for Goulburn Valley; 1920–1936 | Succeeded by John McDonald |
Political offices
| Preceded by Wilfrid Kent Hughes | Deputy Premier of Victoria; 1935–1936 | Succeeded by Francis Old |
Party political offices
| Preceded by John Allan | Leader of the Country Party in Victoria; 1933–1935 | Succeeded by Albert Dunstan |
