= Frank Madden (politician) =

Irish-born Australian politician

Sir Frank Madden
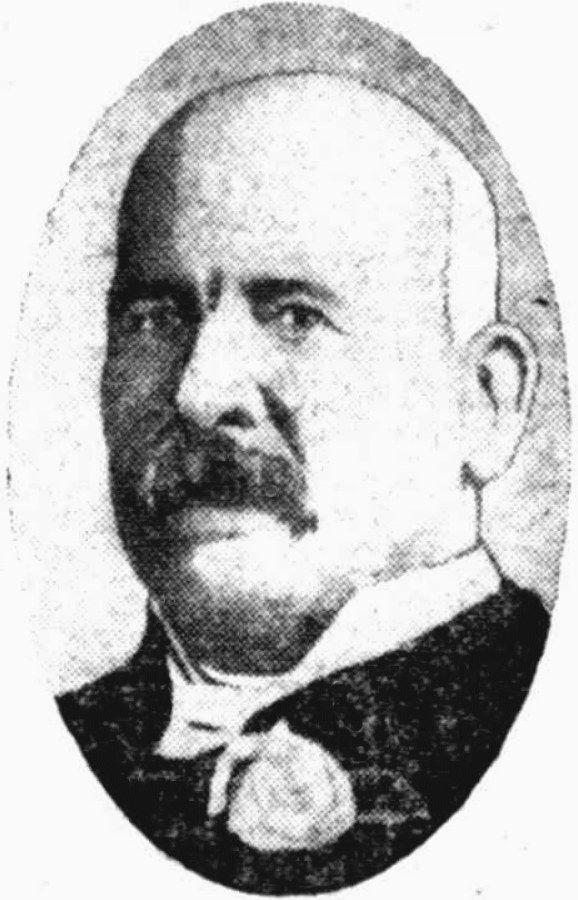

11th Speaker of the Victorian Legislative Assembly
- In office 29 June 1904 – October 1917
- Preceded by: William Beazley
- Succeeded by: John Mackey

Member of the Victorian Legislative Assembly for Eastern Suburbs
- In office 1894–1904
- Preceded by: Duncan Gillies
- Succeeded by: Seat abolished

Member of the Victorian Legislative Assembly for Boroondara
- In office 1904–1917
- Preceded by: Seat established
- Succeeded by: Edmund Greenwood

Personal details
- Born: 29 November 1847 Cork, Ireland
- Died: 17 February 1921 (aged 73) Kew, Victoria, Australia

Sir Frank Madden (29 November 1847 – 17 February 1921) was an Irish-born Australian politician who served as the Speaker of the Victorian Legislative Assembly. Madden was born in Cork to solicitor John Madden and Margaret Macoboy. His family migrated to Melbourne in 1857; Madden subsequently worked as a jackeroo near Skipton before becoming a solicitor. In 1874 he married Annie Eliza Francis, with whom he had seven children. He founded the firm of Madden & Butler and also served as president of the Law Institute from 1886 to 1887.

Madden was elected to the Victorian Legislative Assembly in 1894, representing Eastern Suburbs. He transferred to Boroondara in 1904, and was elected Speaker. He was knighted in 1911, and remained in the Speaker's chair until his defeat in 1917. Madden died in Kew in 1921.

Madden was a close friend of the poet Adam Lindsay Gordon and walked home with Gordon from Melbourne to St Kilda (in the years before public trams were introduced to Melbourne) on the night before Gordon's suicide in June 1870.

Victorian Legislative Assembly
Preceded by William Beazley	Speaker of the Victorian Legislative Assembly; 1904–1917	Succeeded by John Mackey
Preceded by Duncan Gillies	Member for Eastern Suburbs; 1894–1904	Abolished
New seat	Member for Boroondara; 1904–1917	Succeeded by Edmund Greenwood
