= Les Coleman (politician) =

Australian politician (1895–1974)

Patrick Leslie Coleman CBE (21 January 1895 – 6 October 1974), Australian politician, was a member of the Victorian Legislative Council for Melbourne West Province representing the Labor Party from October 1943 until March 1955. He was a member of the Catholic Social Studies Movement ("The Movement") in Victoria, and was expelled from the ministry and the ALP as part of the Australian Labor Party split of 1955. After his expulsion from the ALP in March 1955, he became, with Bill Barry in the Victorian Legislative Assembly, the parliamentary leader of the Australian Labor Party (Anti-Communist), which was briefly referred to in the media as the Coleman-Barry Labor Party. He was a member of that party only until June 1955.

Coleman was educated at the Christian Brothers College in East Melbourne. He qualified as an accountant while working part-time for the Victorian Department of Education, and later owned various hotels. Coleman was a Commissioner of the Melbourne and Metropolitan Board of Works and a Melbourne City Councillor from 1939 to 1960. He was Government Leader in the Legislative Council from 1952 to 1955. He was Assistant Treasurer and Minister of Materials in the second Cain government from 1945 to 1947, and Minister of Transport in the third Cain government from 1952 to 1955.

== Political career ==
Coleman was defeated in seeking re-election for his province in 1955. He unsuccessfully contested DLP preselection for the Australian Senate in 1958, in which he was defeated by Jack Little, Coleman's successor as ALP (Anti-Communist) and subsequently DLP Leader in the Legislative Council.

It has been argued that Little was preferred as a DLP candidate because he was not a Catholic. The DLP was largely a Catholic party, and a non-Catholic candidate had certain electoral attractions, i.e. to show that the DLP was not intentionally sectarian and that members of all religions were welcome. Coleman did not again seek public office.
