= Richard Linton (politician) =

Australian politician

Sir Richard Linton (10 March 1879 – 21 September 1959) was a New Zealand-born Australian politician.

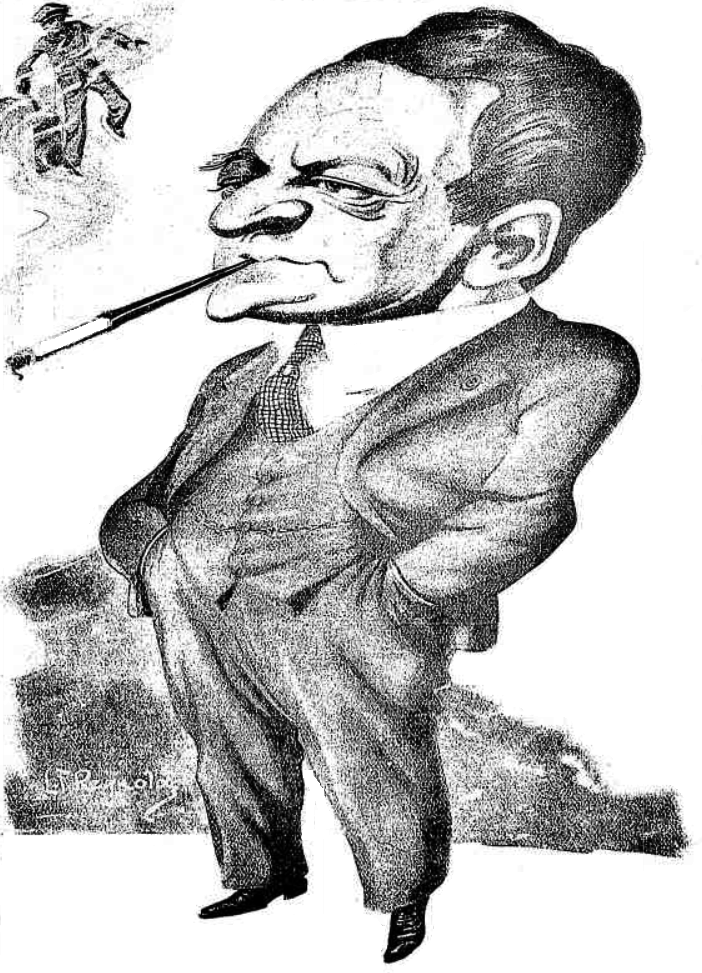
1926 caricature by Reynolds

Linton was born in Palmerston North to land valuer James Linton and Ann née Kibblewhite. He migrated to Australia around 1899 and became a dispatch clerk in Sydney. He moved to Melbourne in 1907 as manager of the Middows Brothers paper and machinery branch there; he would eventually become managing director of the company. On 31 March 1909 he married Ethel Isabel Bannister in Wellington, New Zealand. They had two sons.

In 1924 Linton established the Big Brother Movement, which gave assisted passage to British youths to work on Australian farms. In 1927 he was elected to the Victorian Legislative Assembly as the Nationalist member for Boroondara. He was briefly a minister without portfolio in December 1929, and served as cabinet secretary from 1932 to 1933. In 1933 he resigned from politics to become Agent-General for Victoria in London; he held this position until 1934 and was knighted in 1936. During World War II he was Officer in Charge of the services inquiry and advice bureau. In 1940 and 1948 he unsuccessfully sought pre-selection for the State seat of Toorak. Linton died in East Melbourne in 1959.

Victorian Legislative Assembly
Preceded by Edmund Greenwood	Member for Boroondara; 1927–1933	Succeeded by Trevor Oldham
