= William Moss (Australian politician) =

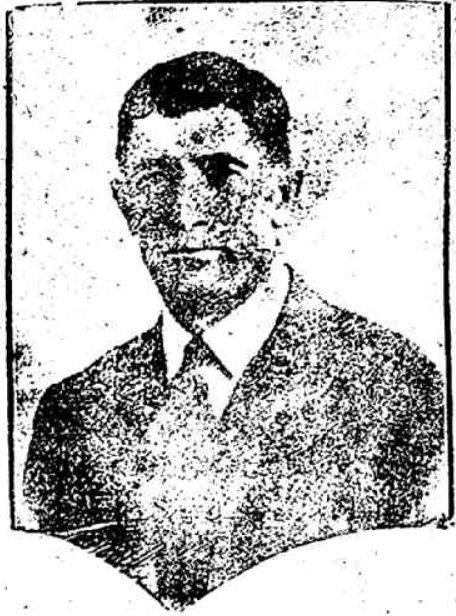
Portrait of William Moss c.1934

William Lionel Moss CBE (9 October 1891 – 4 June 1971) was an Australian grazier who served as federal president of the Australian Country Party from 1962 to 1968.

Moss was born near Numurkah to farmer Frederick George Moss and Isabella, née Spiers. He attended local state schools and helped on his parents' property before enlisting in the Australian Imperial Force on 1 February 1917. He served in the 12th Army Brigade of the Australian Field Artillery as a gunner on the Western Front, but was badly gassed in October 1918 and returned to Australia; he was discharged from the AIF on 19 February 1919.

Returning to Victoria, Moss farmed wheat and wool at Numurkah and joined the Victorian Farmers' Union. In July 1930 he visited Canberra in his capacity as vice-president of the Victorian Wheat Growers' Association as a lobbyist, and joined the Australian Country Party in 1931. Moss opposed the pledge guaranteeing support for party policy instituted by the United Country Party and ran against the UCP's candidate John McEwen for the seat of Echuca in 1934 as the federal party's endorsed candidate. There was another split in 1938, when McEwen accepted office in the Lyons government; this time Moss supported McEwen and joined the breakaway Liberal Country Party. The parties were reunited in 1943 and Moss was involved in drafting the new constitution. He contested the Senate unsuccessfully in 1946.

In 1949 Moss was elected state president of the Victorian Country Party, serving until 1952. He was appointed commissioner of the State Savings Bank of Victoria in 1951 and served as chairman in 1958, 1963 and 1968. He was a councillor of the Shire of Numurkah from 1939 to 1955 (president 1943) and was chairman of the Goulburn Regional Committee from 1944 to 1954. On 17 December 1953, at the age of 62, he married 28-year-old Dorothy Gertrude Hill at the Presbyterian Church in Batesford.

In 1962 Moss was elected federal president of the Country Party, serving until 1968. He regularly contributed to a variety of newspapers, and was chairman of the Enterprise of New Guinea Gold and Petroleum Development company. He was appointed Commander of the Order of the British Empire in 1965. Moss died at Camberwell in 1971 and was buried at Numurkah.

Party political offices
Preceded by Sir Earle Page	Federal President of the Country Party; 1962–1968	Succeeded by Ralph Hunt
