= Bill Barry (politician) =

Australian politician

Minister of Health
- In office 21 November 1945 – 20 November 1947
- Premier: John Cain
- Preceded by: William Haworth
- Succeeded by: Albert Dunstan
- In office 17 December 1952 – 31 March 1955
- Preceded by: Bill Fulton
- Succeeded by: Val Doube

Minister of Housing
- In office 21 November 1945 – 20 November 1947
- Premier: John Cain
- Preceded by: William Haworth
- Succeeded by: Arthur Warner

Minister of Forests
- In office 21 November 1945 – 20 November 1947
- Premier: John Cain
- Preceded by: William Everard
- Succeeded by: Alexander Dennett

Member of the Victorian Legislative Assembly for Carlton
- In office 10 July 1932 – 22 April 1955
- Preceded by: Robert Solly
- Succeeded by: Denis Lovegrove

Personal details
- Born: William Peter Barry; 30 June 1899 Northcote, Victoria
- Died: 21 December 1972 (aged 73) Fitzroy, Victoria, Australia
- Resting place: Melbourne General Cemetery
- Party: Labor Party
- Other political affiliations: Australian Labor Party (Anti-Communist); Democratic Labor Party
- Spouse: Mary Moodie (m. 1926)

William Peter Barry (30 June 1899 – 21 December 1972) was a Member of the Victorian Legislative Assembly for the Electoral district of Carlton from July 1932 until April 1955. Barry was a member of the Labor Party until March 1955, when he was expelled from the party as part of the Australian Labor Party split of 1955. He became, with Les Coleman in the Victorian Legislative Council, joint leader of the Australian Labor Party (Anti-Communist), a party that in 1957 became the Democratic Labor Party.

Barry was educated at St Brigid's School, North Fitzroy, Victoria and at St George's School, Carlton. He was a tobacco worker and union official before entering Parliament, and was considered close to John Wren, the Victorian entrepreneur.

== Political career ==
Barry was elected to the Victorian Legislative Assembly for Carlton in July 1932. The Communist Party opposed Barry at parliamentary elections in the 1940s with some of its leading members, including Ralph Gibson and Dr Gerald O'Dea. Barry was Minister of Transport in the first Cain government in 1943, Minister for Health, for Housing, and for Forests in the second Cain government from 1945 to 1947, and Minister for Health in the third Cain government from 1952 to 1955. He was also a member of the Melbourne City Council from 1939 to 1955.

Barry was expelled from the Labor Party in 1955 and became leader of the Victorian Labor Party (Anti-Communist). He led his group across the floor to support a successful motion of no confidence in John Cain's government. For that perceived act of political treachery, he had thirty pieces of silver thrown at his feet. Noel Counihan's 1955 painting On Parliament Steps, now in the Art Gallery of Ballarat, depicts the incident. Barry was defeated at the election of 1955 by the ALP candidate Denis (Dinny) Lovegrove. As a Democratic Labor Party candidate, Barry unsuccessfully contested the seats of Fitzroy at the 1961 state election, and Greensborough at the 1967 state election.

== Peter Kavanagh ==
Barry's grandson, Peter Kavanagh, was elected to the Victorian Legislative Council for Western Victoria Region at the 2006 state election, representing the Democratic Labor Party, but was defeated at the 2010 state election. Kavanagh was the first DLP candidate to be elected to the Victorian Parliament since 1955, when Frank Scully won the Electoral district of Richmond.

Victorian Legislative Assembly
Preceded by Robert Solly	Member for Carlton; 1932–1955	Succeeded by Denis Lovegrove
Political offices
Preceded by Albert Bussau	Minister of Transport; 1943	Succeeded by James Kennedy
Preceded by William Haworth	Minister of Health; 1945–1947	Succeeded by Albert Dunstan
Preceded by William Haworth	Minister of Housing; 1945–1947	Succeeded by Arthur Warner
Preceded by William Everard	Minister of Forests; 1945–1947	Succeeded by Alexander Dennett
Preceded by Bill Fulton	Minister of Health; 1952–1955	Succeeded by Val Doube
