= Electoral district of Goulburn Valley =

Former state electoral district in Victoria, Australia

Goulburn Valley Victoria—Legislative Assembly
- State: Victoria
- Created: 1904
- Abolished: 1945
- Namesake: Goulburn Valley
- Demographic: Rural
- Coordinates: 36°23′S 144°24′E

The Electoral district of Goulburn Valley was an electoral district of the Victorian Legislative Assembly. The district was replaced by the district of Goulburn in 1945.

== Members for Goulburn Valley ==
Member	Party	Term
George Graham		1904–1914
John Mitchell	Fusion Liberal	1914–1916
John Mitchell	Nationalist	1916–1920
Sir Murray Bourchier	Farmers Union	1920–1922
Sir Murray Bourchier	Country	1922–1936
John McDonald	Country	1936–1945

George Graham represented Numurkah and Nathalia from 1889 to 1904. John Mitchell was a farmer and builder who was an MLA from the 1914 Victorian State election until the 1920 Victorian State election.

== See also ==
- Parliaments of the Australian states and territories
- List of members of the Victorian Legislative Assembly
