= Minister for Health (Victoria) =

Cabinet position in Victoria

Minister for Health of Victoria
- Victorian coat of arms

- Flag of Victoria

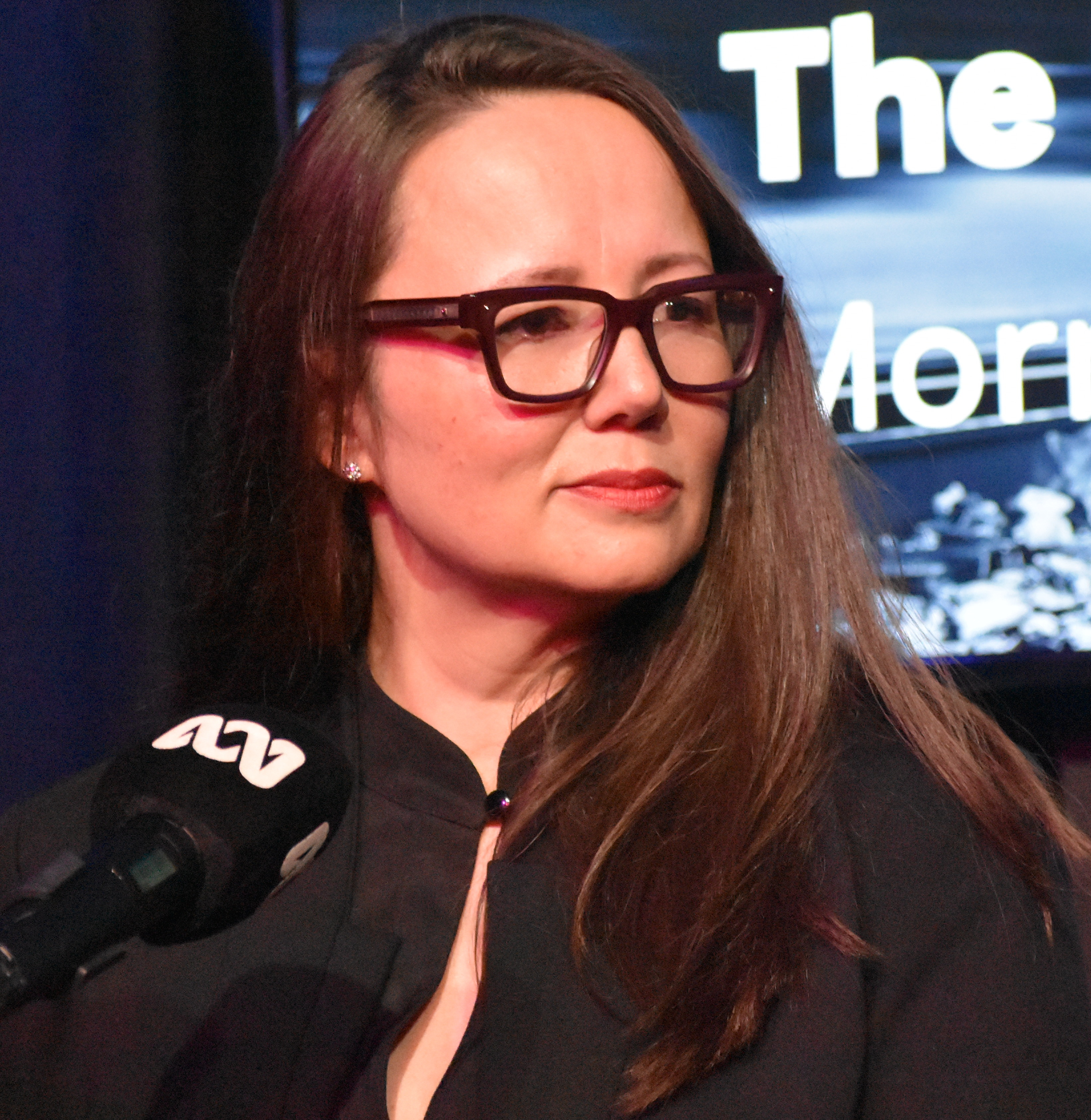
- Incumbent; Harriet Shing MLC since 15 April 2026
- Style: The Honourable
- Member of: Parliament; Cabinet; Executive council
- Reports to: Premier
- Nominator: Premier
- Appointer: Governor on the recommendation of the premier
- Term length: At the governor's pleasure
- Precursor: Minister of Health; Minister of Public Health; Minister for Health Services
- Inaugural holder: Alfred Deakin
- Formation: 19 January 1890 (Minister of Health)

The Minister for Health is a minister within the Executive Council of Victoria tasked with the responsibility of overseeing the Victorian Government's health and hospital laws and initiatives.

Following the 2022 Victorian state election, the Andrews Government created the Minister for Health Infrastructure portfolio alongside the Minister for Health portfolio.

Harriet Shing has been the minister since the most recent cabinet reshuffle in April 2026.

== Ministers for Health ==
Order	MP	Party affiliation	Ministerial title	Term start	Term end	Time in office	Notes
	Alfred Deakin MP		Minister of Health	19 January 1890	5 November 1890	290 days	
	George Langridge MP		Minister of Health	5 November 1890	24 March 1891	139 days	
	John M Davies MLC		Minister of Health	26 March 1891	22 April 1891	27 days	
	George Turner MP		Minister of Health	22 April 1891	23 January 1893	1 year, 276 days	
	Robert Reid MLC		Minister of Health	23 January 1893	27 September 1894	1 year, 247 days	
	Henry Cuthbert MLC		Minister of Health	27 September 1894	14 May 1895	229 days	
	John William Taverner MP		Minister of Health	14 May 1895	16 September 1895	125 days	
	Henry Roberts Williams MP		Minister of Health	16 September 1895	5 December 1899	4 years, 80 days	
	Donald Melville MLC		Minister of Health	5 December 1899	19 November 1900	349 days	
	William McCulloch MLC		Minister of Health	19 November 1900	10 June 1902	1 year, 203 days	
	Robert Reid MLC	Reform	Minister of Health	10 June 1902	6 February 1903	241 days	
	Thomas Bent MP	Reform	Minister of Health	6 February 1903	16 February 1904	1 year, 10 days	
	Ewen Hugh Cameron MP	Reform	Minister of Public Health	16 February 1904	31 October 1908	4 years, 258 days	
	Duncan McBryde MLC	Reform	Minister of Public Health	31 October 1908	8 January 1909	69 days	
	William Baillieu MLC	Commonwealth Liberal	Minister of Public Health	8 January 1909	27 February 1912	3 years, 50 days	
	William Edgar MLC	Commonwealth Liberal	Minister of Public Health	27 February 1912	21 June 1913	1 year, 114 days	
	Frederick Hagelthorn MLC	Commonwealth Liberal	Minister of Public Health	21 June 1913	9 December 1913	171 days	
	William Evans MLC	Labor	Minister of Public Health	9 December 1913	22 December 1913	13 days	
	James Drysdale Brown MLC	Commonwealth Liberal	Minister of Public Health	22 December 1913	9 November 1915	1 year, 322 days	
	Donald McLeod MP	Commonwealth Liberal	Minister of Public Health	9 November 1915	29 November 1917	2 years, 20 days	
	Alfred Downward MP	Nationalist	Minister of Public Health	29 November 1917	21 March 1918	112 days	
	John Bowser MP	Nationalist	Minister of Public Health	21 March 1918	7 July 1919	1 year, 108 days	
	Matthew Baird MP	Nationalist	Minister of Public Health	7 July 1919	7 September 1923	4 years, 62 days	
	Stanley Argyle MP	Nationalist	Minister of Public Health	7 September 1923	18 July 1924	315 days	
	John Percy Jones MLC	Labor	Minister of Public Health	18 July 1924	18 November 1924	123 days	
	Stanley Argyle MP	Country	Minister of Public Health	18 November 1924	20 May 1927	2 years, 183 days	
	William Beckett MLC	Labor	Minister of Public Health	20 May 1927	22 November 1928	1 year, 186 days	
	Stanley Argyle MP	Nationalist	Minister of Public Health	22 November 1928	12 December 1929	1 year, 20 days	
	William Beckett MLC	Labor	Minister of Public Health	12 December 1929	24 June 1931	1 year, 194 days	
	Robert Williams MLC	Labor	Minister of Public Health	24 June 1931	19 May 1932	330 days	
	Stanley Argyle MP	United Australia Party	Minister of Public Health	19 May 1932	2 April 1935	2 years, 318 days	
	John Harris MLC	United Country	Minister of Public Health	2 April 1935	1 January 1942	6 years, 274 days	
	Edwin Mackrell MP	United Country	Minister of Public Health	8 January 1942	14 September 1943	1 year, 249 days	
	Percy Clarey MLC	Labor	Minister of Public Health	14 September 1943	18 September 1943	4 days	
	Ian Macfarlan MP	United Country	Minister of Public Health	18 September 1943	2 October 1945	2 years, 14 days	
	William Haworth MP	Liberal	Minister of Health	2 October 1945	21 November 1945	50 days	
	Bill Barry MP	Labor	Minister of Health	21 November 1945	20 November 1947	1 year, 364 days	
	Albert Dunstan MP	Country	Minister of Health	20 November 1947	3 December 1948	1 year, 13 days	
	Trevor Oldham MP	Liberal	Minister of Health	3 December 1948	8 December 1948	5 days	
	Charles Gartside MLC	Liberal	Minister of Health	8 December 1948	27 June 1950	1 year, 201 days	
	Bill Fulton MP	Country	Minister of Health	27 June 1950	28 October 1952	2 years, 123 days	
	William Dawnay-Mould MP	Electoral Reform League	Minister of Health	28 October 1952	31 October 1952	3 days	
	Bill Fulton MP	Country	Minister of Health	31 October 1952	17 December 1952	47 days	
	Bill Barry MP	Labor	Minister of Health	17 December 1952	31 March 1955	2 years, 104 days	
	Val Doube MP	Labor	Minister of Health	31 March 1955	7 June 1955	68 days	
	Ewen Paul Cameron MLC	Liberal Country Party	Minister of Health	7 June 1955	26 July 1961	6 years, 49 days	
	Ronald Mack MLC	Liberal Country Party	Minister of Health	26 July 1961	14 September 1965	4 years, 50 days	
	Arthur Rylah MP	Liberal Country Party	Minister of Health	15 September 1965	22 September 1965	7 days	
	Pat Dickie MLC	Liberal Country Party	Minister of Health	22 September 1965	11 June 1970	4 years, 262 days	
	John Rossiter MP	Liberal Country Party	Minister of Health	11 June 1970	30 May 1973	2 years, 353 days	
	Alan Scanlan MP	Liberal	Minister of Health	30 May 1973	31 March 1976	2 years, 306 days	
	Vasey Houghton MLC	Liberal	Minister of Health	31 March 1976	16 May 1979	3 years, 46 days	
	Bill Borthwick MP	Liberal	Minister of Health	16 May 1979	8 April 1982	2 years, 327 days	
	Tom Roper MP	Labor	Minister of Health	8 April 1982	2 May 1985	3 years, 24 days	
	David White MLC	Labor	Minister of Health	2 May 1985	7 February 1989	3 years, 281 days	
	Caroline Hogg MLC	Labor	Minister of Health	7 February 1989	18 January 1991	1 year, 345 days	
	Maureen Lyster MLC	Labor	Minister of Health	18 January 1991	6 October 1992	1 year, 262 days	
	Marie Tehan MP	Liberal	Minister for Health Services	6 October 1992	9 November 1992	34 days	
	Marie Tehan MP	Liberal	Minister for Health	9 November 1992	3 April 1996	3 years, 146 days	
	Rob Knowles MLC	Liberal	Minister for Health	3 April 1996	20 October 1999	3 years, 200 days	
	John Thwaites MP	Labor	Minister for Health	20 October 1999	5 December 2002	3 years, 46 days	
	Bronwyn Pike MP	Labor	Minister for Health	5 December 2002	3 August 2007	4 years, 241 days	
	Daniel Andrews MP	Labor	Minister for Health	3 August 2007	2 December 2010	3 years, 121 days	
	David Davis MLC	Liberal	Minister for Health	2 December 2010	4 December 2014	4 years, 2 days	
	Jill Hennessy MP	Labor	Minister for Health	4 December 2014	29 November 2018	3 years, 360 days	
	Jenny Mikakos MLC	Labor	Minister for Health	29 November 2018	26 September 2020	1 year, 302 days	
	Martin Foley MP	Labor	Minister for Health	29 September 2020	27 June 2022	1 year, 271 days	
	Mary-Anne Thomas MP	Labor	Minister for Health	27 June 2022	13 April 2026	3 years, 290 days	
	Harriet Shing MLC	Labor	Minister for Health	15 April 2026	Incumbent	145 days	

== Ministers for Health Infrastructure ==
Order	MP	Party affiliation	Ministerial title	Term start	Term end	Time in office	Notes
1	Mary-Anne Thomas MP	Labor	Minister for Health Infrastructure	5 December 2022	19 December 2024	2 years, 14 days	
2	Melissa Horne MP	Labor	Minister for Health Infrastructure	19 December 2024	Incumbent	1 year, 262 days	
