= Minister for the Environment (Victoria) =

Minister for the Environment of Victoria
- Victorian coat of arms

- Flag of Victoria
- Incumbent; Enver Erdogan MLC since 15 April 2026
- Department of Energy, Environment and Climate Action
- Style: The Honourable
- Member of: Parliament; Executive council
- Reports to: Premier
- Nominator: Premier
- Appointer: Governor on the recommendation of the premier
- Term length: At the governor's pleasure
- Precursor: Minister for Conservation
- Inaugural holder: Evan Walker MLC
- Formation: 1 September 1983

The Minister for the Environment is a minister within the Executive Council of Victoria tasked with the responsibility of overseeing the Victorian Government's laws and initiatives on environment.

Enver Erdogan has been the minister since April 2026.

== Ministers ==
Order	Minister	Party affiliation	Ministerial title	Term start	Term end	Time in office	Notes
1	Evan Walker MLC	Labor	Minister for Planning and Environment	1 September 1983	25 February 1986	2 years, 177 days	
2	Jim Kennan MLC	Labor	Minister for Planning and Environment	25 February 1986	14 December 1987	1 year, 292 days	
3	Thomas Roper MP	Labor	Minister for Planning and Environment	14 December 1987	10 August 1990	2 years, 239 days	
4	Steven Crabb MP	Labor	Minister for Conservation and Environment	10 August 1990	28 January 1992	1 year, 171 days	
5	Barry Pullen MLC	Labor	Minister for Conservation and Environment	28 January 1992	6 October 1992	252 days	
6	Mark Birrell MLC	Liberal	Minister for Conservation and Environment	6 October 1992	3 April 1996	3 years, 180 days	
7	Sherryl Garbutt MP	Labor	Minister for Environment and Conservation	20 October 1999	5 December 2002	3 years, 46 days	
8	John Thwaites MP	Labor	Minister for Water, Environment and Climate Change	5 December 2002	30 July 2007	4 years, 237 days	
9	John Brumby MP	Labor	Minister for Water, Environment and Climate Change	30 July 2007	3 August 2007	4 days	
10	Gavin Jennings MLC	Labor	Minister for Environment and Climate Change	3 August 2007	2 December 2010	3 years, 121 days	
11	Ryan Smith MP	Liberal	Minister for Environment and Climate Change	2 December 2010	4 December 2014	4 years, 2 days	
12	Lisa Neville MP	Labor	Minister for Environment, Climate Change and Water	4 December 2014	23 May 2016	1 year, 171 days	
13	Lily D'Ambrosio MP	Labor	Minister for Energy, Environment and Climate Change	23 May 2016	29 November 2018	2 years, 190 days	
13	Lily D'Ambrosio MP	Labor	Minister for Environment and Climate Action	27 June 2022	5 December 2022	161 days	
14	Ingrid Stitt MLC	Labor	Minister for the Environment	5 December 2022	2 October 2023	301 days	
15	Steve Dimopoulos MP	Labor	Minister for the Environment	2 October 2023	15 April 2026	2 years, 340 days	
16	Enver Erdogan MLC	Labor	Minister for Environment	15 April 2026	INCUMBENT	145 days	

== See also ==
- Minister for the Environment and Water (Australia)
- Minister for Environment (Western Australia)
- Minister for Environment and Natural Resources (Northern Territory)
- Minister for Environment and Heritage
