= Trevor Oldham =

Australian politician (1900–1953)

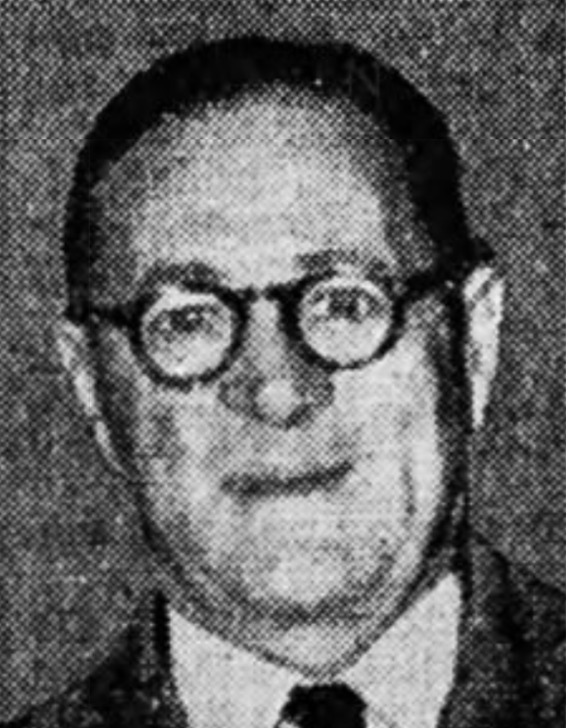

13th Deputy Premier of Victoria
- In office 8 November 1949 – 27 June 1950
- Premier: Thomas Hollway
- Preceded by: Wilfrid Kent Hughes
- Succeeded by: Keith Dodgshun

Attorney-General of Victoria & Solicitor-General of Victoria
- In office 20 November 1947 – 27 June 1950
- Preceded by: Bill Slater
- Succeeded by: Thomas Mitchell

Personal details
- Born: Trevor Donald Oldham; 10 March 1900 St Kilda, Victoria
- Died: 2 May 1953 (aged 53) Jangipara, West Bengal, India
- Party: United Australia Party; Liberal Party; Liberal and Country Party
- Spouse: Kathleen Cooch (m. 1929)
- Education: University of Melbourne
- Profession: Solicitor

Trevor Donald Oldham (10 March 1900 – 2 May 1953) was an Australian politician, who was the leader of the Liberal Party in the state of Victoria from 1952 until his death in 1953. The eldest of three sons born to Arthur and Ethel Oldham, he was educated at Melbourne Church of England Grammar School and the University of Melbourne. He had enlisted in the Australian Imperial Force on 7 November 1918, four days before the Armistice.

He married Kathleen Cooch in 1929.

== Business career ==
Oldham graduated in law at Melbourne University in 1921, and practised as a solicitor until the weight of parliamentary duties limited his time. He was a past president of the Royal Victoria Eye and Ear Hospital and a former deputy chancellor of Melbourne University.

Oldham was a director of Henry Berry & Co., Hoadley Chocolates Ltd, Ruskins Motor Bodys Ltd, and Ensign Dry Cleaners Ltd.

== Political career ==
Oldham entered parliament in 1933 as a member of the United Australia Party. He won the seat of Boroondara and held it until the seat was divided in 1945. When the UAP was re-formed as the Liberal Party in 1945, Oldham won the seat of Malvern. He served as Attorney-General and Solicitor-General of Victoria in Thomas Hollway's first government in 1947, and also served as Deputy Premier of Victoria for eight months before the Liberals lost office to a Country Party and Labor Party alliance in 1950.

In 1951, Les Norman replaced Hollway as Liberal leader, after the party became lukewarm about Hollway's plan of reforming Victoria's malapportioned electoral boundaries. In a provocative move, Hollway contested Norman's urban-based seat of Glen Iris at the 1952 election and won. With their leader having been defeated, the Liberal Party elected Oldham as leader and Henry Bolte as deputy leader.

== Death ==
Oldham and his wife were killed in a plane crash in India on 2 May 1953, on their way to England to attend the coronation of Queen Elizabeth II. The BOAC Comet they were travelling in broke up mid-air a few minutes after leaving Calcutta (now Kolkata), amid severe thunderstorms and torrential rain.

Indian authorities arranged a communal burial in Calcutta of all the victims of the Comet crash. A memorial service was held at St Paul's Cathedral, Melbourne, on 6 May 1953.

The Oldhams were survived by their three children, James 10, Byrony 8 and Kristin 6.

Victorian Legislative Assembly
| Preceded by Richard Linton | Member for Boroondara; 1933–1945 | District abolished |
| District created | Member for Malvern; 1945–1953 | Succeeded by John Bloomfield |
Political offices
| Preceded by Wilfrid Kent Hughes | Deputy Premier of Victoria; 1949–1950 | Succeeded by Keith Dodgshun |
Party political offices
| Preceded by Les Norman | Leader of the Liberal and Country Party in Victoria; 1952–1953 | Succeeded by Henry Bolte |
