= John McDonald (Victorian politician) =

Australian politician (1898–1977)

The Honourable Sir John McDonald
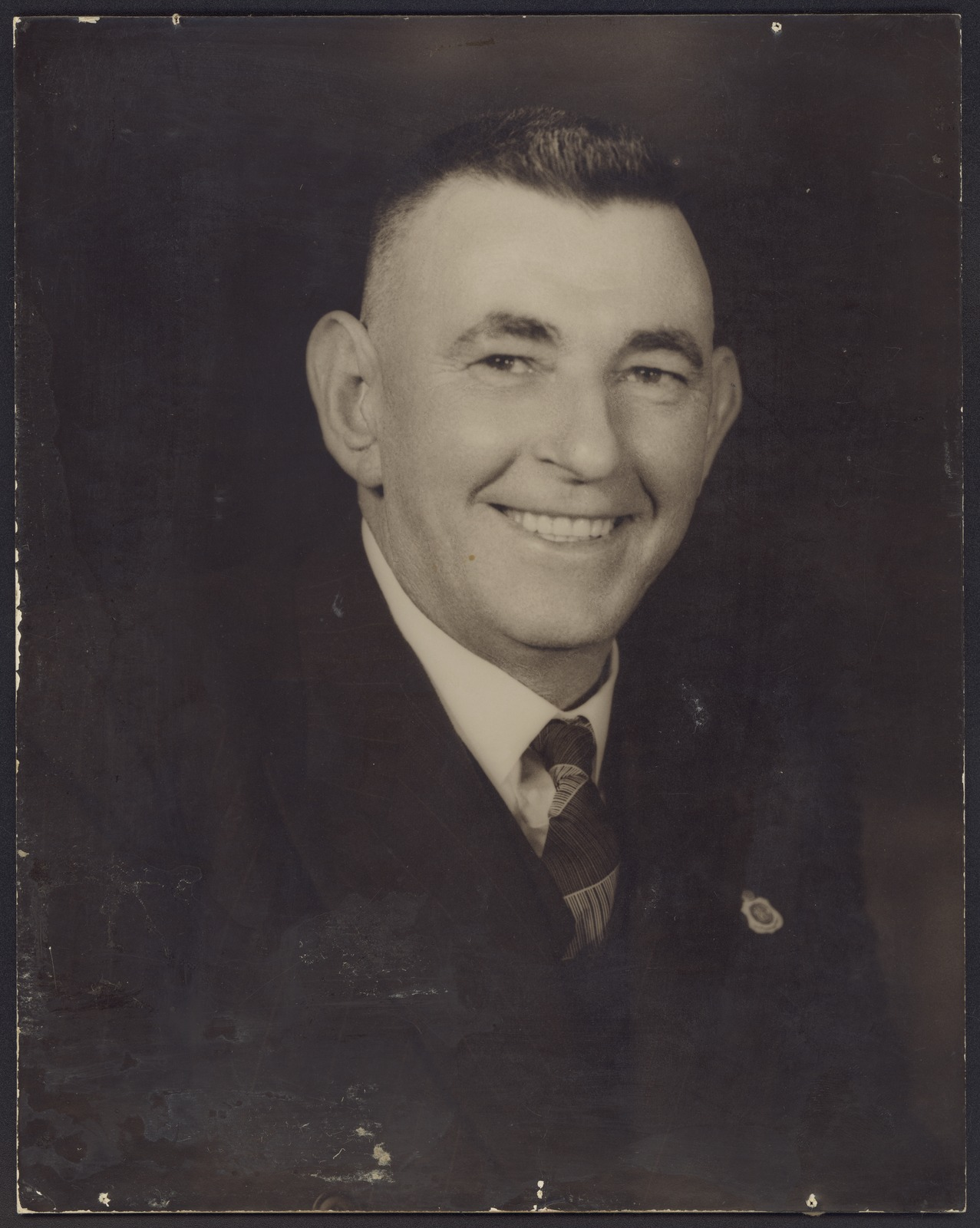

37th Premier of Victoria
- In office 27 June 1950 – 28 October 1952
- Deputy: Keith Dodgshun 1950–1952; Alexander Dennett 1952; Keith Dodgshun 1952
- Preceded by: Thomas Hollway
- Succeeded by: Thomas Hollway
- In office 31 October 1952 – 17 December 1952
- Preceded by: Thomas Hollway
- Succeeded by: John Cain

12th Deputy Premier of Victoria
- In office 20 November 1947 – 3 December 1948
- Premier: Thomas Hollway
- Preceded by: Frank Field
- Succeeded by: Wilfrid Kent Hughes
Other ministerial offices
Treasurer of Victoria
In office 31 October 1952 – 17 December 1952
Premier	Himself
In office 27 June 1950 – 28 October 1952
Minister of Lands
In office 1 November 1947 – 31 December 1948
Premier	Thomas Hollway
Minister of Soldier Settlement
In office 1 November 1947 – 31 December 1948
Premier	Thomas Hollway
Minister of Water Supply
In office 1 November 1947 – 31 December 1948
Premier	Thomas Hollway
In office 18 September 1943 – 2 October 1945
Premier	Albert Dunstan
Minister of Electrical Undertakings
In office 18 September 1943 – 2 October 1945
Premier	Albert Dunstan
Minister without portfolio
In office 1 June 1943 – 30 September 1943
Premier	Albert Dunstan

Member of the Legislative Assembly for Shepparton
- In office 1 November 1945 – 1 April 1955

Member of the Legislative Assembly for Goulburn Valley
- In office 1 September 1936 – 1 October 1945

Councillor of the Shire of Shepparton for West Riding
- In office 1928–1929

Personal details
- Born: John Gladstone Black McDonald; 6 December 1898 Falkirk, Stirlingshire, Scotland, United Kingdom
- Died: 23 April 1977 (aged 78) Mooroopna, Victoria, Australia
- Party: Country Party
- Spouse: Mary Cosser Trotter
- Occupation: Orchardist

Military service
- Allegiance: Australia
- Branch/service: Australian Imperial Force
- Years of service: 1916–1918
- Rank: Private
- Unit: 37th Battalion

Sir John Gladstone Black McDonald (6 December 1898 – 23 April 1977) was an Australian politician who served as the 37th Premier of Victoria, leading a Country Party government from 1950 to 1952. McDonald first attained high office as a minister in the wartime coalition governments led by Albert Dunstan and Thomas Hollway. McDonald became leader of the Country Party and Leader of the Opposition in 1945. Following the 1947 election, he became Deputy Premier in a coalition government led by Hollway, who was the leader of the Liberal Party and served as Acting Premier for much of the term. His tenure as Deputy Premier under Hollway ended in 1948 when the Country Party withdrew from the coalition, accusing the premier of betrayal over the handling of a tramway strike, returning McDonald to the position of Opposition leader.

McDonald first attained the premiership in June 1950 through an agreement between his Country Party and the Australian Labor Party that allowed him to form a minority government. His tenure saw the extension of the adult franchise to the Legislative Council and the establishment of the Mental Hygiene Authority. However, his government was marked by political instability, including open conflict with the federal Liberal government over loan funds and a precarious alliance with Labor, which fractured over the issue of rural electoral weighting. After surviving a no-confidence motion, his government fell in October 1952 when Labor blocked supply in the upper house.

Following a brief and unsuccessful premiership by Hollway, lasting just four days, McDonald was recommissioned as premier and secured a dissolution of parliament. He led the Country Party to the ensuing December 1952 election but was defeated by Labor under John Cain, which won its first majority government in the state. McDonald remained in parliament until 1955, when an electoral redistribution abolished his seat. Knighted in 1957, he spent his later years involved in agricultural and business interests, notably as chairman of the Shepparton Preserving Co. (SPC), from 1965 until 1970.

A staunch anti-communist, he frequently attacked the Cain government for its alleged tolerance of Communist influence in trade unions and its banking policies. As Deputy Premier, he threatened to withdraw the Country Party from the coalition unless the government dealt effectively with Communists and proposed legislation to strip Communists of the right to hold office in trade unions and other organisations. He consistently took a hard line against industrial action and opposed making concessions to striking workers.

== Early life ==
McDonald was born on 6 December 1898 in Falkirk, Scotland, second child of Donald Macdonald, a grocer, and Ann Elizabeth Henry. McDonald was educated at Carmuirs School in Camelon. After the death of his father, McDonald and his family emigrated to Australia in 1912 and settled in Shepparton, Victoria where they ran a dairy farm.

On 4 March 1916, McDonald (who was 17 at the time) lied about his age and enlisted in the Australian Imperial Force during World War I, in which he served with the 37th Battalion on the Western Front. While on the Western Front, he was so seriously wounded that he had a lung removed, something he kept a secret throughout his political career. He returned to Shepparton where he and his brother established an orchard. He was elected as president of the Shepparton Irrigators Association in 1922. On 10 December 1932, he married Mary Cosser Trotter, a 24-year-old schoolteacher, at the Presbyterian Church in Ashfield, Sydney.

McDonald was President of the Goulburn Valley Second Eighteens Football Association from 1927 to 1933.

== Early political career ==
=== Local politics (1928–1929) ===
McDonald was elected to the Shepparton Shire Council in 1928. During his time on the council, he often clashed with other councillors. In July 1929, after only serving twelve months on the council, he announced that he would not seek re-election for a second term in office.

=== Early parliamentary career (1936–1945) ===
The 1936 Goulburn Valley state by-election was held following the appointment of member for Goulburn Valley Murray Bourchier as Agent-General for Victoria in London. McDonald was elected with 50.6% of the primary vote against three other United Country Party (UCP) members.

McDonald delivered his first speech to Parliament in July 1937 during the Address-in-Reply debate. In it, he strongly endorsed the United Country Party government of Premier Albert Dunstan, describing it as "the best this State has had for many years," and praised its record on primary industry, irrigation, forestry, and infrastructure development. The speech set out themes that would define much of his later career, including advocacy for rural roads, hydro-electric power, and expanded state support for agricultural science and irrigation schemes such as the Yarrawonga Weir. McDonald also used his maiden speech to press for changes in several policy areas, including unemployment relief, the pace of irrigation works, and what he described as the long-term neglect of the Department of Agriculture.

He became UCP whip in 1938 following the resignation of Norman Martin. There were four other candidates for the position: Hamilton Lamb, Roy Paton, Albert Allnutt and Finlay Cameron. McDonald was elected in the final round of voting with 15 votes to 13 against Lamb. He was party whip until 1943. On 28 June 1943, McDonald was appointed minister without portfolio in Thomas Hollway's government. On 18 September, he was appointed as Minister of Water Supply and Minister of Electrical Undertakings. Upon his appointment to these portfolios, McDonald stated that he would "bend all of his possible energy" to bring about his personal desire of conserving every drop of water for production, and electricity into every farm.

== Leader of the Opposition (1945–1947) ==
Dunstan resigned as leader of the UCP following the 1945 Victorian state election due to significant gains made by the Labor Party with John Cain forming a minority government. McDonald was elected leader of the UCP on 22 November 1945. This made McDonald the Leader of the Opposition.

In January 1946, McDonald criticised the Cain government's agreement to contribute to a national railway gauge standardisation scheme. He expressed amazement that Victoria had committed to paying £31 million towards the project when the cost of conversion within the state was only £22 million, arguing that the remaining £9 million would effectively subsidise other states. McDonald accused Cain of being "bludgeoned by Canberra dictators" into accepting terms that would "bleed Victorian taxpayers". While stating he was not opposed to uniform gauges in principle, he contended that the project was unaffordable at a time when Victoria faced critical shortages in housing, hospitals, and infrastructure.

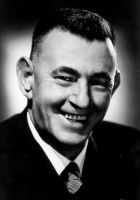
McDonald c.1950s

McDonald led the Country Party into the June 1946 Legislative Council election, in which the party won six of the 17 contested provinces and maintained a total of twelve seats in the upper house.

In July 1946, he accused the government of avoiding parliamentary scrutiny, stating: "Nobody was surprised that the spineless Cain Labour Government had refused an early session of Parliament." McDonald argued that Cain was using the national coal shortage as a pretext to remain in recess, and asserted that practical solutions to the state's problems could be advanced if Parliament were recalled.

In October 1946, during a transport strike, McDonald accused the Cain government of adopting the "weakest and most spineless attitude" by failing to take a firm stand. He argued that the government, as the employer of public instrumentalities, had a "commanding duty" to express its opinion of the strikes and outline its intended course of action. Following a joint meeting of opposition members, McDonald stated that the Opposition would await developments but indicated that an adjournment motion could be moved if the situation deteriorated further.

In November 1946, as industrial action disrupted transport across the state, McDonald moved the adjournment motion in Parliament to attack the Cain government's handling of the crisis. He claimed wheat harvesting was being delayed because machinery remained held up in factories, and accused the government of allowing union leader John Brown to dictate railway policy. He warned that Communist-led unions would become "real rulers" while Parliament was in recess, and that "thousands of Britons and Europeans would be deprived of food because Communists would not let it be harvested." Minister for Agriculture William McKenzie described Opposition members as "jackals" and "squawking kids". When McDonald interjected, McKenzie retorted: "I wonder if this child would be quiet if you gave it a doll." The adjournment motion was defeated 31–26, with Cain dismissing it as a "political stunt".

In the final weeks of the 1946 parliamentary session, McDonald accused the government of rushing through legislation in a "reckless and irresponsible manner," claiming that many bills were neither urgent nor desirable and served only to appease "the extreme and militant elements." He argued that all-night sittings had been used to pass measures that could have been delayed until the next session. Cain responded by appealing for opposition cooperation, stating that the function of an opposition was to assist in the passage of legislation, not to obstruct the workings of the House.

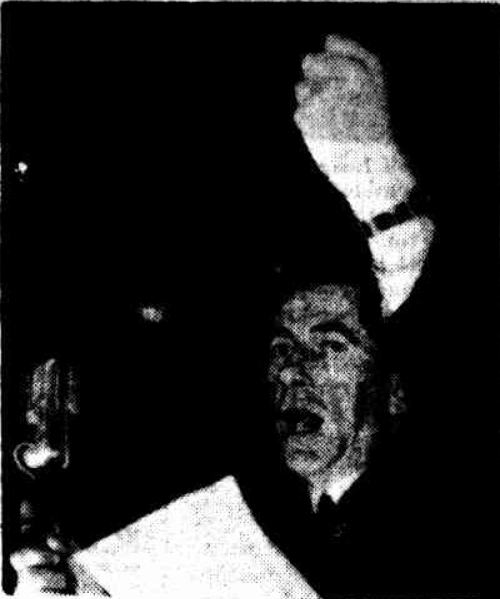
McDonald campaigning in the 1947 Victorian state election

In March 1947, the United Country Party changed its name to simply the "Country Party".

As a transport dispute escalated in April 1947, McDonald called on Cain to proclaim a state of emergency under the Public Safety Preservation Act or resign. Describing the situation as "intolerable", he argued that despite Cain's assurances to Parliament, a state of emergency would exist in Victoria after Monday, and that the government was either unwilling or unable to take action. McDonald declared that the Opposition would "do its utmost to compel the Government to resign" when Parliament resumed. Liberal leader Thomas Hollway echoed the criticism, blaming the government's "lack of leadership and appeasement methods" for leaving it "powerless to deal with the new threat".

Tensions between the Liberal and Country Parties surfaced publicly in June 1947 when Hollway asserted that the Liberal Party was "completely independent" and not a "subsidiary" of the Country Party, responding to suggestions by McDonald that the Liberals had co-operated with Labor's "socialistic programme". The Country Party's general secretary welcomed Hollway's attack, arguing it revealed why non-Labor forces had failed to stop Labor legislation. Premier Cain observed that the "storm had been brewing for some time," claiming that despite losing the Country Party leadership, Albert Dunstan continued to dictate party policy from "backstage."

In August 1947, following Prime Minister Ben Chifley's announcement that the federal government would proceed with legislation to nationalise private banks, McDonald issued a strongly worded statement framing the policy as proof that "the Labour Party is completely Communistic." He argued that the proposed powers would enable the government to "enslave and strangle private enterprise in every shape and form" and gain control over "the private and commercial lives of people." Declaring the moment a "show-down", McDonald warned that there was "no hope for the future of Australia if people allow the Communistic Labour Government to administer the affairs of Australia any longer."

McDonald led the Country Party into the November 1947 state election campaign, with the Party going into the election with 18 seats. McDonald sought to capitalise on voter opposition to the federal Chifley government's proposed banking nationalisation legislation. The campaign was dominated by federal issues, particularly the bank nationalisation proposal, and opposition parties framed the state election as a referendum on the policy. McDonald interpreted the outcome—a landslide defeat for the Labor government of John Cain—as confirmation that "socialism is out for good in Victoria." During the campaign, journalist Edgar Holt wrote that neither McDonald nor Hollway had "the prestige to subdue factionalism" in their parties, and that their failure to unite might cost them votes. The Country Party won 20 seats at the election, an increase of two, winning the seats of Gippsland North, Mildura, Portland and Wonthaggi from Labor, while losing Mernda and Mornington to the Liberal Party. Hollway's Liberal Party won 27 seats while Labor only won 17.

== Deputy premier (1947–1948) ==
The Country Party reluctantly joined Hollway in a coalition government. Following the election defeat of the Cain government, the Governor, Sir Winston Dugan, commissioned Hollway to form a new government. Hollway invited McDonald to join a composite Liberal-Country Party ministry, an offer McDonald accepted subject to ratification by his party's central executive. The central council of the Country Party subsequently approved the formation of a coalition government with an equal allocation of portfolios between the two parties, waiving the party's usual rule that its leader must be Premier in any government of which the Country Party formed a part. The council resolved that in view of the extraordinary conditions prevailing in the state, "stable government should be restored and the fight against socialism and communism fully maintained." Under the agreement, the 12 cabinet portfolios would be divided equally, with the position of Speaker going to the Liberals and the chairmanship of committees to the Country Party. McDonald became Deputy Premier.

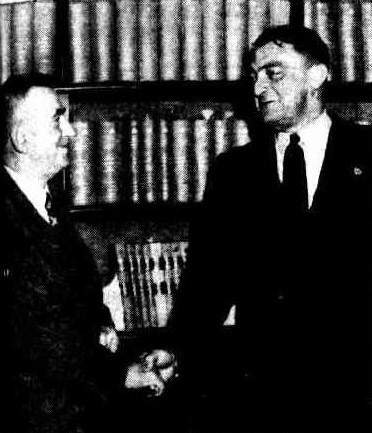
McDonald (left) and Hollway (right) shake hands after reaching a cabinet agreement past midnight on 19 November 1947

The selection of the cabinet involved lengthy and at times bitter negotiations. An initial cabinet list submitted by Hollway was rejected by McDonald and his colleagues, who complained that the Liberals had reserved most senior portfolios for themselves and were using pressure tactics due to their larger numbers in the new parliament. The Country Party also contended that too many portfolios dealing with country interests were being taken by the Liberal Party. After further discussions, the Liberals gave ground on several portfolios, transferring Lands and Soldier Settlement to McDonald. McDonald also insisted on the inclusion of former premier Albert Dunstan as a minister, a demand Hollway strongly resisted before reluctantly agreeing to appoint Dunstan as Minister for Health, a decision Hollway personally resented. The final cabinet was announced after 12 hours of conferences which were completed past midnight on 19 November. The coalition was sworn in on 20 November 1947.

In January 1948, Melbourne's tram network was brought to a halt when approximately 4,000 tram drivers went on strike. McDonald took a hard line, explaining that the government had met the demands of railwaymen because "the railwaymen are working, the tramwaymen are on strike." He stated that the government could not intervene in the tramways dispute because a strike had already been called and the matter was before the Arbitration Court. The strike lasted twelve days and prompted the government to promise legislation requiring a ballot before any future strike.

As Minister of Lands and Water Supply, McDonald toured regional Victoria inspecting infrastructure and addressing local concerns, including a visit to the Kooweerup district in February 1948 to discuss blackberry eradication with shire councils and local residents.

Tensions within the coalition surfaced as early as April 1948, when McDonald threatened that the Country Party might withdraw from the composite government unless the administration dealt "effectively with Communists." Hollway responded that he was "at a loss to understand" McDonald's outburst and offered to discuss a "change of Government" if McDonald believed Victoria could be "better served" by an alternative arrangement. The Liberal Party's annual conference on 21 April also called for a Royal Commission into Communism and a ban on the party if proven to be engaged in subversive activities. At a Country Party rally in May 1948, McDonald outlined his government's plans to introduce severe legislation to control Communists. He claimed that Communist disruption of industry was frustrating production and that the Chifley government was "afraid to deal" with them. McDonald forecast that the proposed law would strip Communists of the right to hold office in "any organisation, even on the committee of a football club," adding that he had been personally threatened by Communists but was "not worried."

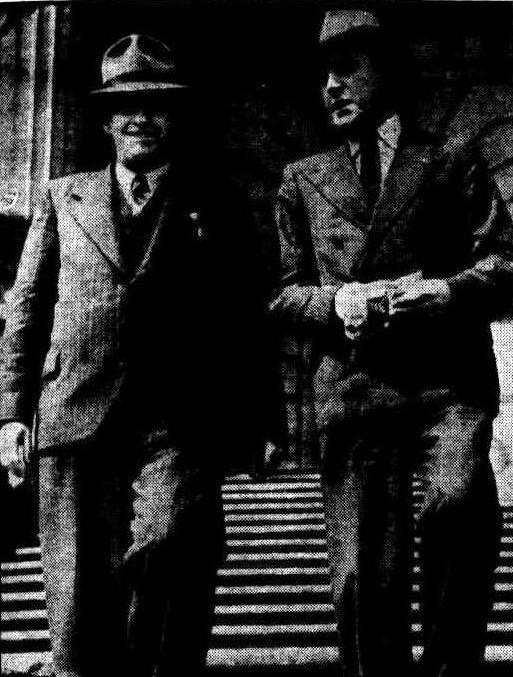
John McDonald (left) and Thomas Hollway (right) on the steps of Victorian Parliament House 10 November 1947

Later in May 1948, McDonald addressed a regional planning conference at Tatura, expressing scepticism about the objectives of regional committees. He questioned whether they sought statutory powers that would eliminate State parliaments and shire councils, or whether they would be content as "glorified welfare associations passing pious resolutions." McDonald claimed that Labor sought "the abolition of all parliaments" in favour of a "supreme economic council." He also argued that flour mills, butter factories, tanneries, abattoirs and canneries should be located close to their sources of production, and asserted that the Shepparton cannery paid up to £34,000 annually in freight charges while its Melbourne competitors paid only £5,000. McDonald warned that the rural population was "getting very old" because young people preferred city amenities.

Hollway fell seriously ill in late June 1948 and was confined to bed in Ballarat from 25 June. McDonald assumed the role of Acting Premier, a position he held throughout July while Hollway recovered. On 17 July, McDonald visited Hollway in hospital in Ballarat and expressed confidence that the Premier would return to deliver the Budget speech in early August. Hollway returned to Melbourne on 4 August, declaring himself "100 per cent better", and resumed his duties in time to present the Budget on 10 August.

As Acting Premier in July 1948, McDonald opposed a proposal by Liberal member Hugh MacLeod to ban the serving of liquor to Aboriginal people of mixed descent. McDonald stated that he doubted such legislation could be effective and that he opposed "interference with the liberties of people with Aboriginal blood." He argued that what was needed instead was "an effort to encourage these people to accept full citizenship in its best form."

In late August 1948, McDonald was once again returned to the position of Acting Premier when Hollway and Cain left for London to attend the Empire Parliamentary Association conference. Later that month, McDonald led the Victorian delegation to the Premiers' Conference in Canberra while Hollway prepared for his overseas trip. McDonald accused Prime Minister Chifley of having "tucked away" money in the national welfare fund, to which Chifley replied that the fund had been created by act of Parliament and suggested that "someone has been misleading you." A heated exchange later broke out when New South Wales Labor Premier Jim McGirr challenged Victoria's right to import coal from England while still receiving NSW coal. When federal minister H. V. Evatt accused Victoria of wanting NSW coal without sharing its overseas supplies, McDonald retorted: "I will share the coal with you if you will share the price." Prime Minister Chifley intervened, stating that Victoria should not to be penalised for coal it brought from overseas.

McDonald met with a deputation from the Housewives' Association in September and promised to consider legislation compelling traders to resume home deliveries, stating that "if it were right for men to have some leisure from their jobs, it was also right for women." Later that month, McDonald accused the Shop Assistants' Federation of attempting to "spike every effort" to restore home deliveries, after the union opposed the use of junior workers for the task. He stated that "provided it did not interfere with schooling, I can see no harm in healthy lads helping with deliveries." McDonald subsequently met with retail traders, acknowledging that home deliveries were "costly and difficult to maintain" but urging them to restore services, stating that "somebody had to start somewhere to restore the idea of service to the community."

In October 1948, McDonald addressed a congregation at Wesley Church, arguing that Australia's reliance on war-ravaged Britain for manufactured goods was "ludicrous and humiliating" and an admission that Australians were becoming "a decrepit, lazy and irresponsible band of people." He blamed "artificial prosperity" for a spirit of "levity and indifference" and warned that shortages were "mostly the result of indolence and sloth."

== Hollway-McDonald coalition collapses ==
On 15 November, McDonald's government proclaimed the Essential Services Act, with McDonald stating that the government believed it was "in the best interests of the community." The Act made strikes in essential services illegal unless approved beforehand by a secret ballot of union members, with union officials facing fines of up to £1000 and participating workers up to £50. In response, the state executives of the Australian Railways Union and the Tramway Employees' Association called a 24-hour statewide stoppage for 17 November, which idled approximately 25,000 railway workers and more than 6,000 tram and bus employees.

The strike caused significant disruption to Melbourne, with thousands of workers travelling on foot or by bicycle and more than 40 ships left idle when work on the waterfront ceased. Cabinet was divided, with a section favouring the use of the full rights of the Act against those who had called the strike. McDonald, who had taken a hard line during the January tram strike, was among those who favoured prosecution. The strike was not extended beyond midnight, and striking workers held a protest meeting against the Act on the banks of the Yarra River before returning to work.

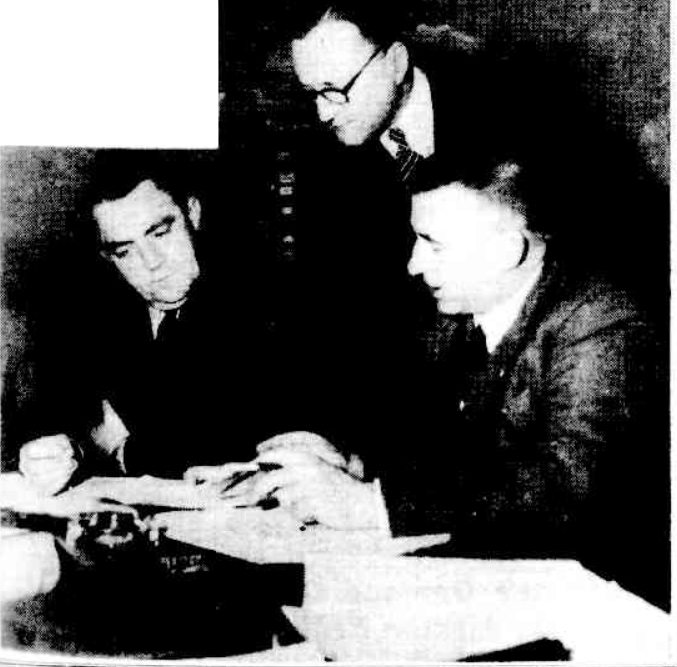
Hollway, McDonald and Oldham draw up list of unionists to be prosecuted

Hollway returned to Melbourne from overseas on 22 November. On the same day, the State Cabinet held day-long conferences before deciding to prosecute members of the state executives of the ARU and the TEA for authorising the 24-hour strike without holding the secret ballot required under the Essential Services Act. About 30 executive members faced prosecution, with summonses to be issued after 72 hours. A sub-committee of three ministers – Hollway, McDonald and Attorney-General Trevor Oldham – drew up the list of those to be prosecuted. The government indicated it might introduce amending legislation to provide for gaol sentences if fines were not paid. The union secretaries, Brown and O'Shea, were not prosecuted at this stage because they were paid officers of their unions rather than unpaid executives. The government also declined to declare a state of emergency under the Act, a step that would have allowed it to compel labour to operate strike-bound essential services.

On 28 November, a settlement was reached between the Hollway government and the Combined Unions Committee. The terms were: the Seamen's Union would lift its coal blockade; the rail and tramways unions would submit any future dispute likely to cause industrial trouble to the Trades Hall Council for consideration, with the government to have an opportunity to seek a settlement; and the government would agree to adjourn the pending prosecutions under the Essential Services Act. Hollway denied that he had undertaken not to use the Act, stating "I gave no undertaking of any sort whatever," but confirmed that the Crown would not oppose adjournment of the court proceedings. A mass meeting of 5,000 people at the Yarra Bank acclaimed the settlement as "a great victory," while Country Party ministers were reported to be dissatisfied with the terms.

Tensions within the coalition reached a breaking point in late November 1948. Country Party members expressed resentment against Premier Hollway for agreeing to a settlement of the Essential Services Act dispute without first consulting full cabinet, move they saw as hurried. They also criticised his ultimatum to Country Party ministers that "if you don't want to agree to my settlement terms, you can leave the Ministry." Country Party ministers contended that they had been treated with "scant courtesy" by the Premier, especially as McDonald had "borne the brunt of the fight against the Communists" while Hollway was overseas. The Parliamentary Liberal Party, by contrast, recorded its entire approval of the Premier's actions.

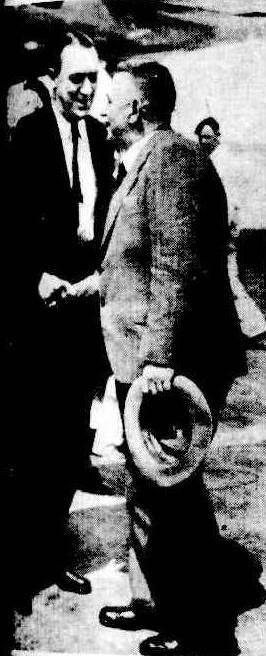
McDonald greets Hollway as he arrives in Melbourne on 22 November 1948

The Country Party met on the morning of 1 December and carried a resolution supporting the stand taken by McDonald and his ministers, declaring that "appeasement methods only strengthen the hands of the Communists and disruptionists and cannot result in permanent industrial peace." A second resolution called for the Essential Services Act to be strengthened through proposed amendments. At midnight, Hollway issued an ultimatum: the Country Party must withdraw its "hostile" resolution, publicly apologise for its criticism of his handling of the dispute, and agree to the removal of Albert Dunstan from the ministry. If not, he declared, the coalition would collapse and an all-Liberal government would be formed.

The Country Party claimed that the Liberals had been inconsistent in their attitude toward prosecutions, noting that while Hollway was overseas the Liberals had recommended prosecution and McDonald had proceeded with it, but upon Hollway's return they had approved of adjourning the charges. Country Party members did not ask their ministers to resign at their meeting, but there was considerable criticism of Hollway. Labor rejected Country Party advances for support, demanding the repeal of the Essential Services Act as the price, which the Country Party would not agree to. Meanwhile, Liberal headquarters in Canberra reportedly pressured Hollway not to create a division between the two parties due to possible repercussions at the next federal election.

On 2 December, Hollway set a deadline of 12:30 p.m. for the Country Party to agree to his ultimatum, after which he would see the Governor, tender the resignation of the ministry, and seek a commission to form an all-Liberal government. In a letter to McDonald, Hollway described Dunstan as "an intriguer, a disruptive force and an embarrassment to the Party ever since it was formed." Dunstan responded that the Country Party was "as solid as a rock" and that if Hollway dropped him from the cabinet, all other Country Party members would walk out as well. McDonald indicated that the composite ministry had split, and Parliament adjourned until the following Tuesday. Liberals held only 28 seats out of 65 in the Legislative Assembly, meaning an all-Liberal government would be vulnerable.

After the deadline expired, Hollway visited the Governor on 3 December, who granted leave to dissolve the old Cabinet and form a new one, which would be an all-Liberal cabinet. McDonald revealed that Hollway had written asking him to join the new Cabinet, but he found the offer "offensive" and declared that unless Hollway withdrew his "offensive remarks," no Country Party member would have anything to do with the new ministry. Federal Country Party deputy leader John McEwen warned that the rift would win the next federal election for Labor, claiming Hollway had been "led up the garden path" by Labor leader John Cain.

On 4 December, Hollway delayed forming a final ministry, giving former Country Party ministers – with the exception of Dunstan – until the night of 6 December to decide whether to join a new Cabinet. An interim ministry of six Liberal ministers was sworn in, with Hollway himself taking over McDonald's portfolios of Water Supply and Soldier Settlement. Hollway issued a public statement acknowledging that "things had been said in the heat of the moment" but left the way open for the Country Party to continue working together, stating that he was still prepared to include the original five Country Party ministers plus one additional minister. McDonald refused to comment from his home in Shepparton, saying only that a Country Party meeting would be held the following day. Hollway also dismissed criticism from McEwen, claiming that McEwen had himself left the Country Party rather than be associated with Dunstan, and called on Dunstan to make a "graceful exit" from politics.

On 6 December, there were indications that a resolution might still be possible. A senior Country Party minister suggested that Dunstan might be induced to retire from the ministry and "take a rest" before contesting the federal seat of Wimmera, in which case a coalition government could be formed again. Some Liberals believed they could persuade at least five Country Party members to cross the floor, naming several former ministers as potential defectors. McDonald and Dunstan held secret talks at McDonald's home in Shepparton over the weekend, but Dunstan claimed that Country Party feeling had not changed, stating that the party was sticking to its original attitude: if one Country Party minister was to leave the cabinet, all would go out. Hollway said he was awaiting the result of the Country Party meeting before making a statement, and that if he had not received a decision by 8 p.m. he would form an all-Liberal government.

On 7 December, Hollway rejected a last-minute proposal from the Country Party for a composite government. A deputation led by McDonald told Hollway that the party was willing to join a coalition if permitted to select its own ministers according to party rules. Hollway replied that he would "under no circumstances" have Sir Albert Dunstan in his government, and rejected the proposal. At midnight, Hollway announced the formation of an all-Liberal ministry.

On 13 December 1948, charges against nine trade union leaders under the Essential Services Act were struck out in the City Court for want of prosecution. The Crown Solicitor and the solicitors for the defendants had agreed that the cases should be struck out, and no counsel appeared. The decision confirmed that the Hollway government had abandoned the prosecutions as part of the compromise negotiated with the Trades Hall Council.

== Leader of the Opposition (1948–1950) ==
Following the collapse of the coalition, McDonald returned to the position of Leader of the Opposition in December 1948. The Country Party decided to go into opposition on McDonald's casting vote.

On 8 December, McDonald addressed the Legislative Assembly, describing Hollway as a "prince of intriguers" and a "king of disruptionists." He claimed that Hollway had told him "to go to hell" after refusing to agree to settlement terms that were not to be disclosed. Dunstan then proclaimed that Hollway was the "weakest Premier who has ever drawn breath."

In January 1949, Hollway alleged that the Country Party would have precipitated "civil war" during the Essential Services Act dispute, claiming that some Country Party ministers had been prepared to say "let us have a box on, let us mow them down; show them who is master." McDonald described the remarks as "deliberate lies" and threatened to reveal the true facts of what had occurred in cabinet if Hollway repeated them. Both leaders indicated they would refuse to serve in a coalition led by the other, and a reunion between the two parties appeared increasingly remote. McDonald continued to blame Hollway for the rift between the two parties.

In late February, Hollway defended his handling of the strike settlement, claiming that the Essential Services Act had been proclaimed "after the strikes were over" and that he had discussed with union leaders how to settle "on an equitable and fair basis." He repeated his claim that his Country Party colleagues had left his office "to go to the races" while he negotiated, adding that they returned "in a pretty snaky sort of a mood." Hollway argued that the Country Party had been unable to "sink its identity and fight a common cause," and framed the political divide as a choice between a "Russian system" and the "British system of Parliamentary government."

Hollway attempted to take over the Country Party in March by renaming the Liberal Party to the "Parliamentary Liberal Country Party". Four Country Party MPs resigned to join the new party. The move failed, but it deepened the hostility between McDonald and Hollway.

At the Country Party annual conference in mid-March, McDonald renewed his calls for severe anti-communist legislation. He demanded that Hollway introduce a bill to strip Communists of the right to hold office in "any organisation, political, business or sporting," and argued that the Communist Party should be declared illegal so that police could "find them" rather than having them "walking around disguised as decent citizens." The conference debate revealed internal party tensions, with one delegate, arguing that Chifley's social policies were doing more to combat Communism by addressing the needs of the working class than any anti-communist law ever could. Other delegates questioned the hostility toward the Liberals, with one asking "Has some madness bitten the people in this hall?"

In June 1949, McDonald indicated that the Country Party would be "prepared to support Labor as the premier party or accept Labor support" to obtain "sound legislation and administration" for Victoria. Cain confirmed that Labor would support Country Party candidates in the upcoming Legislative Council elections, citing McDonald's proposal to extend the franchise as a reason for cooperation. The prospect of a Labor-Country Party alliance drew fierce criticism from Hollway, who called it a "complete repudiation" of everything McDonald had said against Communism and socialism. Hollway claimed there was "no doubt" that a pact existed between the two parties and described it as "party manoeuvring of the lowest order," adding that McDonald could not "run with the hare and hunt with the hounds." Despite the attacks from Hollway, McDonald insisted that the Country Party's attitude towards socialism remained unchanged.

Following the June 1949 Legislative Council election, the Country Party Central Council held a "post-mortem" on the result. Some members believed that accepting Labor support to defeat the Liberals had been the "undoing" of the party in country electorates, with former CP supporters voting Liberal fearing "further socialistic measures." Two questions were raised: whether Dunstan was exercising "undue influence" within the party, and whether McDonald had been "hindering the party by virulent attacks" on Hollway. There was a strong move to stop further personal attacks on Liberals, and the question of remaining in opposition was also raised. McDonald himself interpreted the result differently, stating that "the determined attack by the Liberals and vested interests did not liquidate the Country Party" and that "any other conclusion would be indulging in wishful party propaganda." An editorial in the same week observed that the campaign had been dominated by "intense personal animosities roused by the split in the Hollway-McDonald Cabinet" rather than policy issues.

By mid-1949, pressure was mounting within the Country Party to leave the opposition benches, with some members believing the party was losing ground by remaining in opposition, especially after the result of the Legislative Council election. However, the personal bitterness between McDonald and Hollway was by now so deep that there was "no chance of reconciliation," and the Country Party seemed likely to remain politically isolated. However, at a presessional meeting of the parliamentary caucus of the Country Party on 2 August, it was decided that the party would stay in opposition. McDonald stated that "We will remain where we are. That's definite."

In August 1949, Hollway proposed closing the unprofitable Wonthaggi coal mine and transferring the miners to Morwell. Cain attacked the proposal as "the most fantastic ever made" by the Hollway Government, warning that Wonthaggi would become a "ghost town." McDonald sided with Cain, stating that Labor's attack on the Government was "justified" and that it was "ridiculous to close Wonthaggi while it was still capable of producing coal."

In September 1949, McDonald rejected any suggestion of an alliance with other parties, declaring that the Country Party "refuses to be merely the appendage of any other party" and had "no arrangements or alliances or understandings with any other political party whatsoever." He blamed the parliamentary deadlock, in which Hollway's minority government struggled to pass legislation without Country Party support, on the Premier's "incapacity," claiming that Hollway had "split the non-Labor forces" the previous November and was now trying to divide the Country Party rather than "concentrating on governing Victoria."

In November 1949, Hollway's government put forward an appropriation bill that would have given his government supply until June of the next year. McDonald moved an amendment that "supply not be granted beyond March." The bill eventually passed shortly after 5 a.m. on the morning of 16 November. McDonald and Cain were both critical of the manner in which the bill passed, with McDonald declaring that "The Premier can only have one reason for his action, and that is he does not want to face the people in an election."

There were once again rumors in December that the Country Party would quit opposition and join the government when Parliament was to resume in April of the next year. The Sunraysia Daily reported that deputy leader Keith Dodgshun would be expected to lead the push to get the party out of opposition, and that McDonald and Dunstan would "warmly oppose any change in the party's role." It was also believed that some of Dodgshun's supporters wanted Dodgshun, rather than McDonald to lead the party.

McDonald was involved in a car accident on the Goulburn Valley Highway near Katunga on 5 January 1950. McDonald was in the car with Leonard Green who was interested in buying a property from McDonald. Green was driving. Upon returning, the car skidded on loose gravel, left the road, crashed into a fence, and then into a tree where it was wrecked. Both occupants were injured, with McDonald suffering from a lacerated head and knee, as well as many bruises. He was hospitalised for 15 days in the Mooroopna Base Hospital. While recovering in Mooroopna Hospital, McDonald told a reporter that his beard – grown because he had been unable to shave – was causing him "more concern than the exigencies of politics." He said his wife disliked it and it "scares our three children." He asked that no photograph be taken. He also used the interview to call for legislation to compel the removal of loose gravel from highways, which he blamed for the accident.

By February, the move by certain members of the Country Party parliamentary caucus to move the party out of opposition was made, although this time led by party whip Bill Fulton. Fulton stated on the night of 22 February that he had written to McDonald asking him to immediately call a party meeting to decide the party's role in Parliament. He made the move on behalf of at least five party members.

In his first major public statement since the car accident on 3 March 1950, McDonald demanded an immediate state election, arguing that the people should be given the right to end Hollway's "useless and unworkable" administration. He said the Government had "rightly earned the contempt of the people of Victoria". Cain had also called for an early election. McDonald cited evidence of "dissension and friction" within the Government, including the cancellation of a building permit, a resignation from the Liquor Fact-finding Committee, and recent expulsions from the Liberal and Country Party.

At the Country Party's annual state conference in Bendigo on 29-30 March 1950, McDonald secured a decisive victory when delegates voted to keep the party in opposition.A motion to leave the opposition benches was withdrawn, and the conference carried a motion that all such resolutions be withdrawn by a "comfortable majority." The result was described as a "sweeping victory" for McDonald, backed by Dunstan. The conference also changed the party's rules on composite ministries, requiring future coalition agreements to be approved by two-thirds of the Central Council. The debate revealed internal tensions, with one delegate warning that the party's hostility toward the Liberals was "playing right into the hands of the Communists," while others argued that the party should never again enter a composite ministry. McDonald and Dodgshun confirmed afterwards that there would be "no change in the CP role."

=== 1950 State election ===
On 12 April 1950, Hollway requested a dissolution of the Legislative Assembly from the Governor, Sir Dallas Brooks, after both McDonald and Cain informed the Governor that they could not form a government. Brooks granted the dissolution, and Hollway announced that the election would be held on 13 May 1950. Hollway framed the campaign around the ongoing tram strike, then in its seventh week, accusing the Opposition parties of refusing to condemn the "Communist leaders" of the strike.

Launching the Country Party's election campaign in Shepparton on 21 April 1950, McDonald framed the election as a fight for the party's survival. He claimed that the Liberals wanted to "exterminate" the Country Party and that they had "pushed us out of the Ministry" in 1948. He declared that the Country Party would "never surrender our principles to an organisation whose interests are wholly within the confines of the metropolitan area," and refused to yield to "city domination." The party's policy included the provision of finance to enable "people of limited means to enjoy a better and real standard of living."

The Country Party went into the election on a platform of housing construction, decentralisation and education. McDonald promised to increase housing advances from £1540 to £1760 and reduce interest rates to two per cent, declaring that home ownership was "the one sure counter to Communism." He pledged that no school of more than five pupils would be closed, and that bus services would be provided where schools had to be shut. He also criticised the Liberals for rejecting his 1948 anti-communist legislation, claiming that if they were "sincere in their opposition to Communism" they would have passed it. The Country Party, he argued, would provide stable government, unlike the Hollway administration, which he blamed for the recent tram strike and the State's industrial turmoil. McDonald declared that the Country Party had "not deviated from its stern opposition to Communism" and challenged Hollway to name a single instance where the Country Party had refused to support action against it.

Campaigning in Castlemaine on 6 May, McDonald escalated his attacks, declaring that legislation passed during the last session showed that the Hollway Government was "socialistic."

The election was held on 13 May 1950. The Labor Party won 24 seats, the Liberal and Country Party 27 seats, and the Country Party 13 seats – a loss of three seats from its previous total of 16. No party had an absolute majority. Hollway declared that he would attempt to form a minority government depending on Country Party support, but contemporary observers noted that a coalition was "highly improbable" because of the "long-standing bitterness" between the parties. The Country Party had pledged before the election not to form government with the Liberals, and Labor now replaced the Country Party as the official Opposition.

On 23 June, the Hollway government was defeated on a no-confidence motion moved by McDonald. McDonald spoke for only six and a half minutes before the dinner adjournment. McDonald said during the parliamentary debate that the Government had made the two-party system the main election issue, but the electors had refused to give it the mandate it sought, and the Government had returned with a reduced number of members and could not provide stable government. Later, closing the debate, he declared that he had never misled the electors, insisting that he had always told voters the Country Party would accept support from any party willing to help it enact its policy. He also revealed that an emissary had come to his home on two occasions offering him the position of Agent-General in London, with a five-to-seven-year term and directorships on his return, in an attempt to persuade him to abandon the Country Party. "My mother had borne four children," he said, "and not one of them was a traitor." After a 17-hour debate, the motion was carried 38 votes to 24 at 4 o'clock in the morning, following an alliance between the Country Party and Labor.

Cain agreed to support a minority Country Party government, despite the party being the smallest in the Assembly. In response, Hollway once again advised Brooks to dissolve the Assembly on the grounds that the agreement was a "gross fraud [that was] perpetrated on the electors", although Hollway himself knew that this argument was weak on constitutional grounds. Brooks refused to dissolve the Assembly and instead commissioned McDonald as premier.

== Premier of Victoria (1950–1952) ==
McDonald was commissioned as premier by Brooks on 26 June 1950, with his term beginning the next day. When the Legislative Assembly met the following day, he announced that his government would immediately seek two months' supply and introduce legislation to increase superannuation payments to public servants by 25 per cent. Hollway immediately attempt to move a no-confidence motion against the new government and refused to grant leave for the introduction of an urgent supply bill. The Speaker ruled that Hollway could not move the motion without leave, which McDonald refused. Outside the House, he offered the Labor Party limited support in exchange for legislation to redistribute electoral seats, an offer Cain flatly rejected, stating that "judging by Mr. Hollway's past record, such a promise is not worth the paper it is written on." McDonald responded: "Apparently, what was wrong for the Country Party to do last week is now right for the L.C.P. to do this week." The House then adjourned for a month to allow the new government to prepare its legislative programme.

Victorian Legislative Assembly
Preceded by Murray Bourchier	Member for Goulburn Valley; 1936–1945	Seat abolished
Seat created	Member for Shepparton; 1945–1955	Seat abolished
Political offices
Preceded by Thomas Hollway	Premier of Victoria; 1950–1952	Succeeded by Thomas Hollway
Preceded by Thomas Hollway	Premier of Victoria; 1952	Succeeded by John Cain
Party political offices
Preceded by Albert Dunstan	Leader of the Country Party in Victoria; 1945–1955	Succeeded by Herbert Hyland
