= Minister for Transport Infrastructure =

Portfolio within the Cabinet of Victoria (Australia)

Minister for Transport Infrastructure of Victoria
- Victorian coat of arms

- Flag of Victoria
- Incumbent; Gabrielle Williams MP since 19 December 2024
- Department of Transport and Planning
- Style: The Honourable
- Member of: Parliament; Cabinet; Executive council
- Reports to: Premier
- Nominator: Premier
- Appointer: Governor on the recommendation of the Premier
- Term length: At the governor's pleasure
- Formation: 2 April 1935
- First holder: Albert Bussau MP

The Victorian Minister for Transport Infrastructure is a minister within the Executive Council of Victoria. The minister's area of responsibility includes overseeing transport projects, major road projects, and the Victorian Department of Transport.

A number of acts of parliament give the minister executive powers relevant to the portfolio, these include the Development Victoria Act 2003, Major Transport Projects Facilitation Act 2009, North East Link Act 2020, Transport Integration Act 2010, Victorian Planning Authority Act 2017, and the West Gate Tunnel (Truck Bans and Traffic Management) Act 2019.

== Ministers ==
Order	Minister	Party affiliation	Ministerial title	Term start	Term end	Time in office
1	Albert Bussau MP	United Country	Minister of Transport	2 April 1935	18 April 1938	3 years, 16 days
2	Herbert Hyland MP	United Country	Minister of Transport	27 April 1938	14 September 1943	5 years, 140 days
3	Bill Barry MP	Labor	Minister of Transport	14 September 1943	18 September 1943	4 days
4	James Kennedy MLC	United Country	Minister of Transport	18 September 1943	2 October 1945	2 years, 14 days
5	James Disney MLC	Liberal	Minister of Transport	2 October 1945	21 November 1945	50 days
6	Clive Stoneham MP	Labor	Minister of Transport	21 November 1945	20 November 1947	1 year, 364 days
7	Wilfrid Kent Hughes MP	Liberal	Minister of Transport	20 November 1947	29 October 1949	1 year, 343 days
8	Thomas Hollway MP	Liberal	Minister of Transport	29 October 1949	15 December 1949	47 days
9	Edward Guye MP	Liberal	Minister of Transport	15 December 1949	27 June 1950	194 days
(2)	Herbert Hyland MP	Country	Minister of Transport	27 June 1950	28 October 1952	2 years, 123 days
10	John DonMP	Liberal	Minister of Transport	28 October 1952	31 October 1952	3 days
(2)	Herbert Hyland MP	Country	Minister of Transport	31 October 1952	17 December 1952	47 days
11	Les Coleman MLC	Labor	Minister of Transport	17 December 1952	31 March 1955	2 years, 104 days
12	Don Ferguson MLC	Labor	Minister of Transport	31 March 1955	7 June 1955	68 days
13	Arthur Warner MLC	Liberal	Minister of Transport	7 June 1955	5 September 1962	7 years, 90 days
14	Edward Meagher MP	Liberal	Minister of Transport	5 September 1962	9 May 1967	4 years, 246 days
15	Vernon Wilcox MP	Liberal	Minister of Transport	9 May 1967	30 May 1973	6 years, 21 days
(14)	Edward Meagher MP	Liberal	Minister of Transport	30 May 1973	31 March 1976	2 years, 306 days
16	Joe Rafferty MP	Liberal	Minister of Transport	31 March 1976	18 August 1978	2 years, 140 days
17	Rob Maclellan MP	Liberal	Minister of Transport	18 August 1978	8 April 1982	3 years, 233 days
18	Steve Crabb MP	Labor	Minister of Transport	8 April 1982	2 May 1985	3 years, 24 days
19	Tom Roper MP	Labor	Minister of Transport	2 May 1985	14 December 1987	2 years, 226 days
20	Jim Kennan MLC	Labor	Minister of Transport	14 December 1987	10 August 1990	2 years, 239 days
21	Peter Spyker MP	Labor	Minister of Transport	10 August 1990	6 October 1992	2 years, 57 days
22	Alan Brown MP	Liberal	Minister of Transport	3 April 1996	6 January 1997	278 days
23	Robin Cooper MP	Liberal	Minister of Transport	6 January 1997	20 October 1999	2 years, 287 days
24	Peter Batchelor MP	Labor	Minister of Transport	20 October 1999	1 December 2006	7 years, 42 days
25	Jacinta Allan MP	Labor	Minister for Transport Infrastructure	29 November 2018	5 December 2022	4 years, 6 days
25	Jacinta Allan MP	Labor	Minister for Transport and Infrastructure	5 December 2022	27 September 2023	296 days
26	Danny Pearson MP	Labor	Minister for Transport Infrastructure	2 October 2023	19 December 2024	1 year, 78 days
27	Gabrielle Williams MP	Labor	Minister for Transport Infrastructure	19 December 2024	4 August 2026	1 year, 262 days
28	Vicki Ward MP	Labor	Minister for Public Transport	4 August 2026	Incumbent	34 days
