= Hamer ministry =

59th ministry of the Government of Victoria

Hamer Ministry
- 59th ministry of Victoria, Australia
- Date formed: August 23, 1972
- Date dissolved: June 5, 1981

People and organisations
- Monarch: Elizabeth II
- Governor: Sir Rohan Delacombe (until 31 May 1974); Sir Henry Winneke (from 1 June 1974)
- Premier: Rupert Hamer
- Deputy premier: Lindsay Thompson
- No. of ministers: 19
- Member party: Liberal Party
- Status in legislature: Majority government
- Opposition party: Labor
- Opposition leaders: Clyde Holding (until 29 June 1977); Frank Wilkes (from 29 June 1977)

History
- Elections: 1973 state election 1976 state election 1939 state election
- Predecessor: Bolte ministry
- Successor: Thompson ministry

The Hamer Ministry was the 59th ministry of the Government of Victoria. It was led by the Premier of Victoria, Rupert Hamer, of the Liberal Party. The ministry was sworn in on 24 August 1972.

== Portfolios ==
=== 16 May 1979 - 5 June 1981 ===
Minister	Portfolios
Rupert Hamer, MLA	Premier; Minister for State Development, Decentralization and Tourism (until 3 February 1981, 15 March 1981 to 17 March 1981); Minister for Economic Development (15 March 1981 to 17 March 1981)
Lindsay Thompson, MLA	Deputy Premier; Treasurer; Minister for Police and Emergency Services; Chief Secretary (until 3 September 1980)
Jim Balfour, MLA	Minister for Fuel and Power; Minister of Mines; Minister for Minerals and Energy (until 3 February 1981)
Bill Borthwick, MLA	Minister for Health
Ian Smith, MLA	Minister of Agriculture (until 23 December 1980); Minister for Economic Development (23 December 1980 to 15 March 1981, 17 March 1981 to 25 May 1981); Minister for State Development, Decentralization and Tourism (3 February 1981 to 15 March 1981, 17 March 1981 to 25 May 1981)
Alan Hunt, MLC	Minister for Education
Vasey Houghton, MLC	Minister of Lands; Minister of Soldier Settlement; Minister for Conservation
Brian Dixon, MLA	Minister for Youth, Sport and Recreation; Minister of Housing (until 3 February 1981); Minister for Employment and Training (from 23 December 1980)
Jock Granter, MLC	Minister of Water Supply; Minister of Forests
Digby Crozier, MLC	Minister for Local Government
Rob Maclellan, MLA	Minister of Transport
Walter Jona, MLA	Minister for Community Welfare Services
Haddon Storey, MLC	Attorney-General; Minister for Federal Affairs
Jim Ramsay, MLA	Minister of Consumer Affairs; Minister of Labour and Industry; Minister for Economic Development (from 25 May 1981); Minister for State Development, Decentralization and Tourism (from 25 May 1981)
Tom Austin, MLA	Minister for Public Works (until 23 December 1980); Minister for Property and Services (until 23 December 1980); Minister for Agriculture (from 23 December 1980)
Lou Lieberman, MLA	Minister for Planning; Minister for Minerals and Energy (from 3 February 1981); Minister of Mines (from 3 February 1981)
Alan Wood, MLA	Minister for Immigration and Ethnic Affairs (until 17 February 1981); Minister for Public Works (from 23 December 1980); Minister for Property and Services (from 23 December 1980)
Norman Lacy, MLA	Minister for the Arts; Minister of Educational Services (from 23 December 1980)
Glyn Jenkins, MLC	Parliamentary Secretary of the Cabinet
Jeff Kennett, MLA	Minister for Housing (from 3 February 1981); Minister for Immigration and Ethnic Affairs (from 17 February 1981)

=== 31 March 1976 - 16 May 1979 ===
Minister	Portfolios
Rupert Hamer, MLA	Premier; Treasurer; Minister for the Arts
Lindsay Thompson, MLA	Deputy Premier; Minister for Education
Jim Balfour, MLA	Minister for Fuel and Power; Minister of Mines; Minister for Minerals and Energy (from 1 September 1977)
Pat Dickie, MLC	Chief Secretary (until 16 August 1978)
Bill Borthwick, MLA	Minister of Lands; Minister of Soldier Settlement; Minister for Conservation
Joe Rafferty, MLA	Minister of Transport (until 18 August 1978); Chief Secretary (18 August 1978 to 4 April 1979)
Ian Smith, MLA	Minister for Agruculture
Roberts Dunstan, MLA	Minister for Public Works (until 10 August 1978); Minister for Property and Services (17 May 1978 to 10 August 1978)
Alan Hunt, MLC	Attorney-General (until 6 May 1976); Minister for Local Government; Minister for Federal Affairs (until 18 August 1978); Minister for Planning (from 16 August 1978)
Alan Scanlan, MLA	Minister for Special Education
Vasey Houghton, MLC	Minister for Health
Brian Dixon, MLA	Minister for Youth, Sport and Recreation; Minister for Social Welfare (until 13 February 1979); Minister for Community Welfare Services (from 13 February 1979)
Jock Granter, MLC	Minister of Water Supply; Minister of Forests
Digby Crozier, MLC	Minister for State Development and Decentralization (until 23 May 1978); Minister for Tourism (Victoria) (until 23 May 1978); Minister for State Development, Decentralization and Tourism (from 23 May 1978)
Rob Maclellan, MLA	Minister of Labour and Industry (until 18 August 1978); Minister of Consumer Affairs (until 16 August 1978); Minister for Public Works (10 August 1978 to 16 August 1978); Minister for Property and Services (10 August 1978 to 16 August 1978); Minister of Transport (from 18 August 1978)
Walter Jona, MLA	Minister for Immigration and Ethnic Affairs
Geoff Hayes, MLA	Minister for Housing; Minister for Planning (until 16 August 1978)
Haddon Storey, MLC	Attorney-General (from 6 May 1976); Minister for Federal Affairs (from 18 August 1978); Chief Secretary (from 4 April 1979)
Jim Ramsay, MLA	Minister of Consumer Affairs (from 16 August 1978); Minister of Labour and Industry (from 18 August 1978)
Tom Austin, MLA	Minister for Public Works (from 16 August 1978); Minister for Property and Services (from 16 August 1978)

=== 30 May 1973 - 31 March 1976 ===
Minister	Portfolios
Rupert Hamer, MLA	Premier; Treasurer; Minister for the Arts
Lindsay Thompson, MLA	Deputy Premier; Minister for Education
Edward Meagher, MLA	Minister of Transport; Minister of Forests (until 22 June 1973)
Jim Balfour, MLA	Minister for Fuel and Power; Minister of Mines
John Rossiter, MLA	Chief Secretary
Vernon Wilcox, MLA	Attorney-General
Pat Dickie, MLC	Minister for Housing; Minister for Aboriginal Affairs (until 19 February 1975)
Bill Borthwick, MLA	Minister of Lands; Minister of Soldier Settlement; Minister for Conservation
Joe Rafferty, MLA	Minister of Labour and Industry; Minister of Consumer Affairs; Minister for Federal Affairs (from 18 February 1975)
Murray Byrne, MLC	Minister for State Development and Decentralization; Minister for Tourism (Victoria); Minister of Immigration
Ian Smith, MLA	Minister for Agriculture
Roberts Dunstan, MLA	Minister for Public Works; Minister of Water Supply (until 22 June 1973)
Alan Hunt, MLC	Minister for Local Government; Minister for Planning
Alan Scanlan, MLA	Minister for Health
Vasey Houghton, MLC	Minister for Social Welfare
Brian Dixon, MLA	Minister for Youth, Sport and Recreation
Jock Granter, MLC	Minister of Water Supply (from 22 June 1973); Minister of Forests (from 22 June 1973)

=== 23 August 1972 - 30 May 1973 ===
Minister	Portfolios
Rupert Hamer, MLA	Premier; Treasurer; Minister for the Arts
Lindsay Thompson, MLA	Deputy Premier; Minister for Education
Gilbert Chandler, MLC	Minister for Agriculture
George Reid, MLA	Attorney-General
Edward Meagher, MLA	Chief Secretary; Minister of Forests
Jim Balfour, MLA	Minister for Fuel and Power; Minister of Mines
John Rossiter, MLA	Minister for Health
Vernon Wilcox, MLA	Minister of Transport
Pat Dickie, MLC	Minister for Housing; Minister for Aboriginal Affairs
Bill Borthwick, MLA	Minister of Lands; Minister of Soldier Settlement; Minister for Conservation
Joe Rafferty, MLA	Minister of Labour and Industry
Murray Byrne, MLC	Minister for State Development and Decentralization; Minister for Tourism (Victoria); Minister of Immigration
Ian Smith, MLA	Minister for Social Welfare; Minister for Youth and Recreation
Roberts Dunstan, MLA	Minister of Water Supply; Minister for Public Works
Alan Hunt, MLC	Minister for Local Government
Alan Scanlan, MLA	Minister without Portfolio
Vasey Houghton, MLC	Parliamentary Secretary of the Cabinet

Parliament of Victoria
Preceded by Bolte Ministry	Hamer Ministry; 1972–1981	Succeeded by Thompson Ministry
