= Cain II ministry =

62nd ministry of the Government of Victoria

Cain II Ministry
- 62nd ministry of Victoria, Australia
- Date formed: 8 April 1982
- Date dissolved: 10 August 1990

People and organisations
- Monarch: Elizabeth II
- Governor: Sir Brian Murray (until 3 October 1985); Davis McCaughey (from 3 October 1985)
- Premier: John Cain
- Deputy premier: Robert Fordham
- No. of ministers: 21
- Member party: Labor Party
- Status in legislature: Majority government
- Opposition party: Liberal–National Coalition
- Opposition leaders: Lindsay Thompson (until 5 November 1982); Jeff Kennett (5 November 1982 to 23 May 1989); Alan Brown (from 23 May 1989)

History
- Elections: 1982 state election 1985 state election 1988 state election
- Predecessor: Thompson ministry
- Successor: Kirner ministry

The Cain II Ministry was the 62nd ministry of the Government of Victoria. It was led by the then Premier of Victoria, John Cain Jr., of the Australian Labor Party. The ministry was sworn in on April 8, 1982, and remained a single ministry through three parliaments until on August 10, 1990. The ministry dissolved upon Cain's resignation as Leader of the Labor Party.

== Ministry ==
=== 13 October 1988 – 10 August 1990 ===
Minister	Portfolios
John Cain, MP	Premier
Robert Fordham, MP	Deputy Premier; Minister for Agriculture and Rural Affairs; Minister for the Arts (to 31 January 1989)
Evan Walker, MLC	Minister for Industry, Technology and Resources (to 7 February 1989); Minister for the Arts; Minister for Major Projects; Minister responsible for Post-Secondary Education (from 7 February 1989)
David White, MLC	Minister for Health (to 7 February 1989); Minister for Industry, Technology and Resources; Minister assisting the Treasurer (from 7 February 1989)
Steve Crabb, MP	Minister for Police and Emergency Services, Minister for Tourism
Rob Jolly, MP	Treasurer
Tom Roper, MP	Minister for Planning and Environment; Minister for Consumer Affairs
Neil Trezise, MP	Minister for Sport and Recreation
Peter Spyker, MP	Minister for Community Services; Minister for Prices (from 7 February 1989)
Jim Kennan, MLC	Minister of Transport
Caroline Hogg, MLC	Minister for Ethnic Affairs; Minister assisting the Minister for Education (to 7 February 1989); Minister for Health (from 7 February 1989)
Joan Kirner, MP	Minister for Education; Deputy Premier (from 7 February 1989)
Andrew McCutcheon, MP	Attorney-General; Minister for Local Government (to 7 February 1989); Minister for Ethnic Affairs (from 7 February 1989)
Ronald Walsh, MP	Minister for Property and Services; Minister for Water Resources
Barry Pullen, MLC	Minister for Housing and Construction
Neil Pope, MP	Minister for Labour
Kay Setches, MP	Minister for Conservation; Minister for Forests and Lands
Maureen Lyster, MLC	Parliamentary Secretary of the Cabinet (to 7 February 1989); Minister for Local Government (from 7 February 1989)
Barry Rowe, MP	Minister for Agriculture and Rural Affairs (from 7 February 1989)

=== 14 March – 13 October 1988 ===
At the beginning of this ministry, titles "Minister of" were standardised to "Minister for".

Minister	Portfolios
John Cain, MP	Premier
Robert Fordham, MP	Deputy Premier; Minister for Industry, Technology and Resources
Evan Walker, MLC	Minister for Agriculture and Rural Affairs; Minister for Planning and Environment (to 25 February 1986)
David White, MLC	Minister for Health
Ian Cathie, MP	Minister for Education (to 14 December 1987); Minister for the Arts; Minister assisting the Minister for Education (from 14 December 1987)
Steve Crabb, MP	Minister for Employment and Industrial Affairs (to 8 April 1986); Minister for Labour (from 8 April 1986); Minister for Police and Emergency Services (from 14 December 1987)
Rob Jolly, MP	Treasurer
Race Mathews, MP	Minister for Police and Emergency Services; Minister for the Arts (to 14 December 1987); Minister for Community Services (from 14 December 1987)
Tom Roper, MP	Minister of Transport (to 14 December 1987); Minister for Planning and Environment; Minister for Consumer Affairs (from 14 December 1987)
Jim Simmonds, MP	Minister for Local Government
Neil Trezise, MP	Minister for Sport and Recreation
Frank Wilkes, MP	Minister for Housing (to 14 December 1987); Minister for Water Resources; Minister for Tourism (from 14 December 1987)
Peter Spyker, MP	Minister for Ethnic Affairs; Minister for Consumer Affairs (to 14 December 1987); Minister for Property and Services; Minister assisting the Minister for Labour (from 14 December 1987)
Jim Kennan, MLC	Attorney-General (to 14 December 1987); Minister for Planning and Environment (25 February 1986 to 14 December 1987); Minister of Transport (from 14 December 1987)
Caroline Hogg, MLC	Minister for Community Services (to 14 December 1987); Minister for Education (from 14 December 1987)
Joan Kirner, MLC	Minister for Conservation; Minister for Forests and Lands
Andrew McCutcheon, MP	Minister for Water Resources; Minister for Property and Services (to 14 December 1987); Attorney-General (from 14 December 1987)
Ronald Walsh, MP	Minister for Public Works (to 14 December 1987); Minister assisting the Minister for Employment and Industrial Affairs (to 8 April 1986); Minister assisting the Minister for Labour (8 April 1986 to 14 December 1987); Minister for Housing and Construction (from 14 December 1987)

=== 8 April 1982 – 14 March 1985 ===
Minister	Portfolios
John Cain, MP	Premier; Attorney-General (to 8 September 1983); Minister for Federal Affairs (to 21 December 1982)
Robert Fordham, MP	Deputy Premier; Minister of Education; Minister of Educational Services (to 8 February 1984)
Bill Landeryou, MLC	Minister for Economic Development; Minister for Tourism (to 21 December 1982); Minister for Industrial Affairs; Minister of Labour and Industry (21 December 1982 to 31 August 1983)
Evan Walker, MLC	Minister for Conservation; Minister for Planning (to 1 September 1983); Minister for Planning and Environment (from 1 September 1983); Minister of Public Works (from 8 September 1983)
Ian Cathie, MP	Minister of Housing; Minister for Economic Development (21 December 1982 to 2 November 1983); Minister for Industry, Commerce and technology (from 2 November 1983)
Steve Crabb, MP	Minister of Transport; Minister for Industrial Affairs (from 1 September 1983); Minister of Labour and Industry (1 September 1983 to 8 September 1983)
Jack Ginifer, MP	Minister of Consumer Affairs; Minister of Immigration and Ethnic Affairs (to 10 May 1982)
Rob Jolly, MP	Treasurer; Minister of Labour and Industry (to 21 December 1982)
Eric Kent, MLC	Minister of Agriculture
Rod Mackenzie, MLC	Minister of Forests; Minister of Lands (to 1 September 1983); Minister of Soldier Settlement (to 21 December 1982); Minister for Conservation; Minister of Forests and Lands (from 1 September 1983)
Race Mathews, MP	Minister for Police and Emergency Services; Minister for the Arts
Tom Roper, MP	Minister of Health
Jim Simmonds, MP	Minister for Employment and Training
Jack Simpson, MP	Minister for Property and Services; Minister of Public Works (to 8 September 1983); Minister of Labour and Industry (from 8 September 1983)
Pauline Toner, MP	Minister for Community Welfare Services
Neil Trezise, MP	Minister for Youth, Sport and Recreation
David White, MLC	Minister for Minerals and Energy; Minister of Water Supply
Frank Wilkes, MP	Minister for Local Government
Peter Spyker, MP	Minister of Consumer Affairs; Minister of Immigration and Ethnic Affairs (from 10 May 1982)
Jim Kennan, MLC	Attorney-General (from 8 September 1983)

== Reference list ==
Parliament of Victoria
Preceded by Thompson Ministry	Cain II Ministry; 1982–1990	Succeeded by Kirner Ministry
