= Bolte ministry =

58th ministry of the Government of Victoria

Bolte Ministry
- 58th ministry of Victoria, Australia
- Date formed: June 7, 1955
- Date dissolved: August 23, 1972

People and organisations
- Monarch: Elizabeth II
- Governor: Sir Dallas Brooks (until 7 May 1963); Sir Rohan Delacombe (from 8 May 1963)
- Premier: Sir Henry Bolte
- Deputy premier: Sir Arthur Rylah (until 5 March 1971); Rupert Hamer (from 21 April 1971)
- No. of ministers: 15
- Member party: Liberal Party
- Status in legislature: Majority government
- Opposition party: Labor
- Opposition leaders: John Cain (until 4 August 1957); Ernie Shepherd (20 August 1957 to 12 September 1958); Clive Stoneham (7 October 1958 to 15 May 1967); Clyde Holding (from 15 May 1967)

History
- Elections: 1955 state election 1958 state election 1961 state election 1964 state election 1967 state election 1970 state election
- Predecessor: Third Cain ministry
- Successor: Hamer ministry

The Bolte Ministry was the 58th Ministry of the Government of Victoria, and was led by Liberal Premier Sir Henry Bolte. It succeeded the Cain ministry on 7 June 1955, following the defeat of the Labor government at the 1955 election held ten days earlier. The ministry lasted over 17 years and was followed by the Hamer Ministry on 24 August 1972 after the resignation of Bolte from politics.

== First Ministry ==
On 7 and 8 June 1955, the Governor, Sir Dallas Brooks, appointed the following ministers to the portfolios indicated. Some changes resulted from the departure of William Leggatt, who was appointed Agent-General for Victoria in London in February 1956, the death of Robert Whately the following month, and the appointment of Gordon McArthur as President of the Victorian Legislative Council. However, the ministry was stable from 1956 until its reconstitution after the 1961 election.

The list below is ordered by decreasing seniority within the Cabinet, as indicated by the Government Gazette and the Victorian Year Book.

Minister	Portfolios
Henry Bolte, MLA	Premier; Treasurer; Minister for Conservation
Arthur Rylah, MLA	Deputy Premier; Chief Secretary; Leader of the Government in the Legislative Assembly; Attorney-General
Arthur Warner, MLC	Minister of Transport; Leader of the Government in the Legislative Council
Gilbert Chandler, MLC	Minister for Agriculture; Minister for Forests (21 March 1956 to 10 April 1956); Minister for State Development and Decentralisation (21 March 1956 to 10 April 1956); Minister for Immigration (21 March 1956 to 10 April 1956)
William Leggatt, MLA (until 2 February 1956)	Minister for Education; Minister for Immigration
Sir Thomas Maltby, MLA	Commissioner of Public Works
Sir (Note: Was only knighted during this ministry) Ewen Paul Cameron, MLC	Minister for Health
Wilfred Mibus, MLA	Minister for Water Supply; Minister of Mines
Robert Whately, MLA (until 17 March 1956)	Minister for Forests; Minister for State Development and Decentralisation; Minister for Immigration (from 14 February 1956)
John Bloomfield, MLA	Minister for Labour and Industry (until 14 February 1956); Minister for Electrical Undertakings (until 14 February 1956); Minister for Education (from 14 February 1956)
Horace Petty, MLA	Minister for Housing; Minister for Immigration (from 10 April 1956)
Keith Turnbull, MLA	Minister for Soldier Settlement; Commissioner of Crown Lands and Survey; President of the Board of Land and Works
George Reid, MLA	Minister without portfolio (until 14 February 1956); Minister for Labour and Industry (from 14 February 1956); Minister for Electrical Undertakings (from 14 February 1956)
Gordon McArthur, MLC (until 8 July 1958)	Minister without portfolio (until 10 April 1956); Minister for Forests (from 10 April 1956); Minister for State Development and Decentralisation (from 10 April 1956)
Murray Porter, MLA (from 14 February 1956)	Minister without portfolio (until 16 July 1958); Minister for Forests (16 July 1958 – 21 January 1959); Minister for Local Government (from 16 December 1958)
Alexander Fraser, MLA (from 27 March 1956)	Minister without portfolio (until 21 January 1959); Minister for Forests (from 21 January 1959); Minister for State Development (from 21 January 1959)
Lindsay Thompson, MLC (from 16 July 1958)	Minister without portfolio

== Second Ministry ==
On 28 July 1961, following the 1961 election, the Bolte Ministry was reconstituted. Sir Ewen Cameron became Chairman of Committees in the Legislative Council, whilst Sir Thomas Maltby retired from politics. They were replaced by Ronald Mack and Edward Meagher. The ministry was reconstituted on 8 July 1964 following the 1964 election.

Minister	Portfolios
Henry Bolte, MLA	Premier; Treasurer
Arthur Rylah, MLA	Deputy Premier; Chief Secretary; Leader of the Government in the Legislative Assembly; Attorney-General
Arthur Warner, MLC (until 5 September 1962)	Minister of Transport; Leader of the Government in the Legislative Council
Gilbert Chandler, MLC	Minister for Agriculture; Leader of the Government in the Legislative Council (from 5 September 1962)
Wilfred Mibus, MLA (until 18 April 1964)	Minister for Water Supply; Minister of Mines
John Bloomfield, MLA	Minister for Education
Horace Petty, MLA (until 27 May 1964)	Minister for Immigration (until 9 January 1962); Commissioner of Public Works
Keith Turnbull, MLA	Minister for Conservation; Minister for Soldier Settlement; Commissioner of Crown Lands and Survey; President of the Board of Land and Works
George Reid, MLA	Minister for Labour and Industry; Minister for Electrical Undertakings
Murray Porter, MLA	Minister for Local Government; Commissioner of Public Works (from 27 May 1964)
Alexander Fraser, MLA	Minister for State Development
Lindsay Thompson, MLC	Minister for Housing; Minister for Forests
Ronald Mack, MLC	Minister for Health
Edward Meagher, MLA	Minister without portfolio (until 9 January 1962); Minister for Immigration (9 January – 5 September 1962); Minister of Transport (from 5 September 1962)
Rupert Hamer, MLC	Minister for Immigration (from 5 September 1962)
Jim Balfour, MLA (from 28 April 1964)	Minister for Water Supply; Minister of Mines

== Third Ministry ==
On 8 July 1964, following the 1964 election, the Bolte Ministry was reconstituted.

Minister	Portfolios
Sir Henry Bolte, MLA	Premier; Treasurer; Minister for State Development (until 16 July 1964)
Sir Arthur Rylah, MLA	Deputy Premier; Chief Secretary; Leader of the Government in the Legislative Assembly; Attorney-General; Minister for Health (15–22 September 1965)
Gilbert Chandler, MLC	Minister for Agriculture; Leader of the Government in the Legislative Council
John Bloomfield, MLA	Minister for Education
Sir George Reid, MLA	Minister for Labour and Industry (until 2 December 1965); Minister for Electrical Undertakings (until 2 December 1965); Minister for Fuel and Power (from 2 December 1965)
Murray Porter, MLA	Commissioner of Public Works
Lindsay Thompson, MLC	Minister for Housing; Minister for Forests
Ronald Mack, MLC (until 15 September 1965)	Minister for Health
Edward Meagher, MLA	Minister of Transport
Rupert Hamer, MLC	Minister for Local Government
Jim Balfour, MLA	Minister for Conservation; Minister for Soldier Settlement; Commissioner of Crown Lands and Survey; President of the Board of Land and Works
Thomas Darcy, MLA	Minister for Water Supply; Minister of Mines
John Rossiter, MLA	Minister without portfolio (until 2 December 1965); Minister for Immigration (from 2 December 1965)
Vernon Wilcox, MLA	Minister for Immigration (until 2 December 1965); Minister for Labour and Industry (from 2 December 1965)
Pat Dickie, MLC (from 16 July 1964)	Minister for State Development (until 2 December 1965); Minister for Health (from 22 September 1965)
Jim Manson, MLA (from 22 September 1965)	Minister without portfolio (until 2 December 1965); Minister for State Development (from 2 December 1965)

== Notes ==
Parliament of Victoria
Preceded by Cain Ministry	Bolte Ministry; 1955–1972	Succeeded by Hamer Ministry
