= Thompson ministry =

60th ministry of the Government of Victoria

Thompson Ministry
- 60th ministry of Victoria, Australia
- Date formed: June 5, 1981
- Date dissolved: April 8, 1982

People and organisations
- Monarch: Elizabeth II
- Governor: Sir Henry Winneke (until 28 February 1982); Sir Brian Murray (from 28 February 1982)
- Premier: Lindsay Thompson
- Deputy premier: Bill Borthwick
- No. of ministers: 18
- Member party: Liberal
- Status in legislature: Majority government
- Opposition party: Labor
- Opposition leaders: Frank Wilkes (until 9 September 1981); John Cain (from 9 September 1981)

History
- Predecessor: Hamer ministry
- Successor: Cain II ministry

The Thompson Ministry was the 60th ministry of the Government of Victoria. It was led by the Premier of Victoria, Lindsay Thompson, of the Liberal Party. The ministry was sworn in on 5 June 1981. The ministry was formed when Thompson became Premier following the resignation of Rupert Hamer.

== Portfolios ==
Minister	Portfolios
Lindsay Thompson, MLA	Premier; Treasurer
Bill Borthwick, MLA	Deputy Premier; Minister of Health
Alan Hunt, MLC	Minister of Education
Haddon Storey, MLC	Attorney-General; Minister for Federal Affairs; Minister of Consumer Affairs
Digby Crozier, MLC	Minister for Minerals and Energy
Vasey Houghton, MLC	Minister for Conservation; Minister of Lands; Minister of Soldier Settlement
Brian Dixon, MLA	Minister for Employment and Training; Minister for Youth, Sport and Recreation
Jock Granter, MLC	Minister for Police and Emergency Services
Rob Maclellan, MLA	Minister of Transport
Walter Jona, MLA	Minister for Community Welfare Services
Jim Ramsay, MLA	Minister for Economic Development; Minister of Labour and Industry
Tom Austin, MLA	Minister of Agriculture; Minister of Forests
Lou Lieberman, MLA	Minister for Local Government; Minister for Planning
Alan Wood, MLA	Minister of Public Works; Minister for Property and Services
Norman Lacy, MLA	Minister for the Arts; Minister of Educational Services
Jeff Kennett, MLA	Minister of Housing; Minister of Immigration and Ethnic Affairs
Owen Jenkins, MLC	Minister of Water Supply
Graeme Weideman, MLA	Minister for Tourism; Minister for State Development, Decentralization and Tourism

Parliament of Victoria
Preceded by Hamer Ministry	Thompson Ministry; 1981–1982	Succeeded by Cain Ministry
