= Colony of Victoria =

British colony (1851–1901)

- British Crown Colony
- 1851–1901
- Flag (1877–1901) Coat of arms

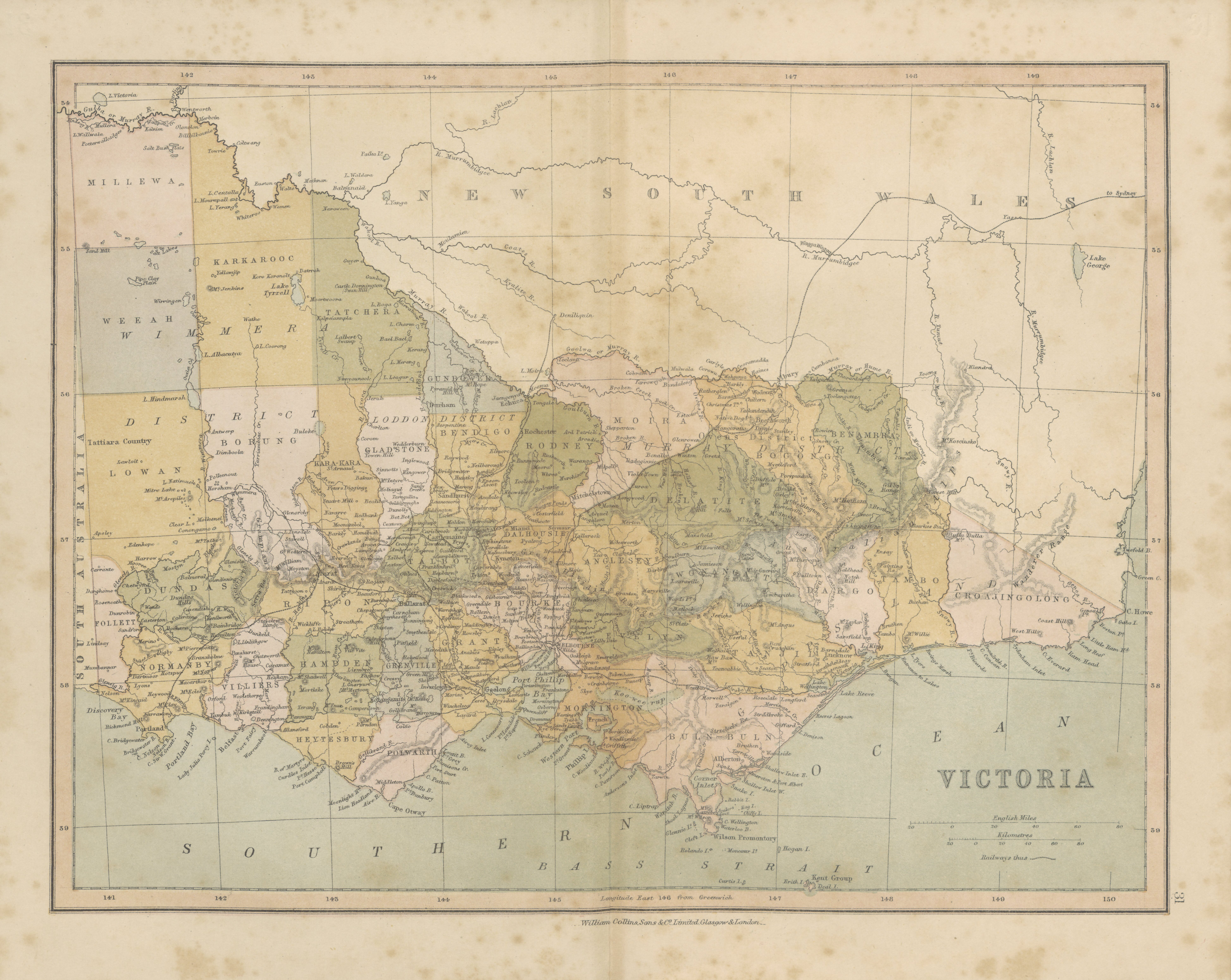
- Map of the colony in 1876

Anthem
- "God Save the Queen"
- Capital: Melbourne
- Government
  - Type: Self-governing colony
- Monarch
  - 1851–1901: Victoria
- Governor
  - 1851–1854: Charles La Trobe (first)
  - 1895–1900: Thomas Brassey (last)
- Legislature: Parliament of Victoria
- History
  - Established: 1 July 1851
  - independence from the Colony of New South Wales: 1 July 1851
  - Responsible self-government: 23 November 1855
  - Federation of Australia: 1 January 1901
Preceded by	Succeeded by
Colony of New South Wales	Victoria (state)
- Today part of: Australia; ∟Victoria

The Colony of Victoria was a historical administrative division in Australia that existed from 1851 until 1901, when it federated with other colonies to form the Commonwealth of Australia.

== History ==
=== Establishment ===
The Colony of Victoria, established in 1851, was carved out of the southeastern part of the Colony of New South Wales, created from the former Port Phillip District of NSW. This separation was motivated by a combination of economic, political, and social factors, such as a burgeoning population and a desire for local governance. The discovery of gold in the region accelerated its development.

=== The Gold Rush era ===
The discovery of gold in 1851 near Ballarat and Bendigo resulted in a gold rush that attracted tens of thousands of immigrants from around the globe, including a significant influx of Chinese miners. This rapid population growth catalysed the development of infrastructure, towns, and cities. Melbourne, the colony's capital, quickly evolved into a thriving metropolis, known for its grand architecture and cultural institutions.

=== Governance and political evolution ===
Victoria's journey towards self-governance began with the establishment of its own legislature in 1851. The Victorian Constitution Act 1855 further solidified its political framework, granting it responsible government. This meant that the colony's executive government was accountable to an elected parliament, bringing it closer towards democratic self-rule.

The Eureka Rebellion of 1854, a miners' uprising against oppressive mining licenses and lack of representation, though swiftly quashed, led to political reforms, including the abolition of the mining license and the introduction of the miner's right, which granted miners voting rights.

=== Economic development ===
Victoria's economy flourished due to the gold rush, which attracted miners and spurred the growth of ancillary industries. Banking, transportation, and manufacturing sectors experienced rapid expansion. The establishment of railways and telegraph lines connected remote mining areas with major cities, facilitating the efficient movement of people and goods.

The fertile lands of the Western District and the Murray River region became prime areas for sheep farming and crop cultivation. The colony's agricultural output met local demands and contributed to exports, further boosting economic growth.

== Demographics ==
The diverse influx of immigrants during the gold rush era contributed to the presence of various cultural practices, cuisines, and traditions. Despite initial tensions and racial discrimination, particularly against Chinese miners, Victoria evolved into a more inclusive society over time.

The University of Melbourne, established in 1853, became a centre for higher learning. Cultural institutions like the Melbourne Public Library (now the State Library of Victoria) and the National Gallery of Victoria, founded in the 1850s, showcased the colony's commitment to intellectual and artistic pursuits.

== Federation ==
By the late 19th century, the idea of unifying the Australian colonies into a single federation gained momentum. Prominent Victorians like Alfred Deakin became major participants in the drafting of the Australian Constitution.

The successful referendum in 1899 led to the establishment of the Commonwealth of Australia on 1 January 1901. Victoria, as one of the founding states, contributed significantly to shaping the newly formed nation. Melbourne served as the temporary federal capital until the parliament moved to Canberra in 1927.

== See also ==
- History of Victoria
- History of Australia (1851–1900)
