= Faraday School kidnapping =

Mass kidnapping committed in Victoria, Australia

On 6 October 1972, at a one-teacher school in the rural town of Faraday in Victoria, Australia, two plasterers, Edwin John Eastwood and Robert Clyde Boland, kidnapped six female pupils and their teacher for a $1,000,000 ransom. The Victorian government claimed it would pay the ransom. The victims escaped and the criminals were captured, tried and convicted. Eastwood escaped and later kidnapped a teacher and nine pupils. He was again captured, convicted and sentenced. While in prison, Eastwood strangled convicted rapist Glen Davies in what was ruled self-defence. He was eventually released, having served his sentence.

== Incident ==
Eastwood and Boland entered the Faraday school armed with a sawn-off shotgun at about 3pm and forced the teacher, 20-year-old Mary Gibbs, and her six pupils (girls aged between 5 and 10) into a red delivery van, leaving a note at the school threatening to kill all of the hostages unless a $1,000,000 cash ransom was paid. They drove off into a remote area in the bush.

That evening, the premier of Victoria, Dick Hamer, announced that the State Government was prepared to pay the ransom. The Victorian education minister, Lindsay Thompson, was driven to the scene by Assistant Commissioner Bill Crowley masquerading as the minister's driver and armed with a trousered derringer pistol. Future Chief Commissioner Mick Miller was concealed under a blanket in the rear of the car with a high-powered rifle. Thompson waited to personally deliver the ransom, but it was never collected. In the early hours of the next morning, the kidnappers told Gibbs they were going to collect the ransom and left her and the pupils.

When they were gone, Gibbs managed to kick out a door panel with her heavy, platform-heeled leather boots and escape with the children in the dark, finding help a few kilometres away. Eastwood and Boland were captured by heavily armed Victoria Police officers after an extensive manhunt.

== Aftermath ==
Eastwood pleaded guilty to seven counts of kidnapping in December 1972 and was sentenced to fifteen years' imprisonment with a non-parole period of ten years; three armed robbery charges against him were taken into consideration in exchange for evidence against Boland.

Boland was convicted by a jury in March 1974 after three trials and was sentenced to seventeen years' imprisonment with a non-parole period of twelve years, although Eastwood has maintained that Boland was innocent and that the real co-kidnapper was related to a man Thompson spoke to at Woodend, who had been detained at the scene but later released. Boland was released in November 1983, having served 11 years of his 17-year term.

On 22 January 1973 Mary Gibbs was awarded a George Medal for her bravery. Lindsay Thompson received a Bronze Medal for Bravery from the Royal Humane Society for his actions.

== Eastwood's escape and second kidnapping ==
On 16 December 1976, Eastwood escaped from Geelong Prison after stealing a car. On 15 February 1977, he kidnapped a teacher and nine pupils from the Wooreen State School in Gippsland, Victoria. While driving off, he collided with a truck and held the driver and his partner hostage. Twenty minutes later, another log truck came along and Eastwood waved it to a stop before taking the driver and passenger hostage. He then commandeered a campervan with two female occupants and also took them hostage.

Finally, with 16 hostages, he demanded a ransom of US$7 million, guns, 100 kilograms of heroin and cocaine, the release of 17 inmates from Pentridge Prison and a fully-fueled late model car. However, one of the hostages, Robin Smith, escaped and notified police, and Eastwood fled with the remaining hostages. After the campervan was disabled by police gunfire at Woodside, he was shot below the right knee and re-captured by police. (Eastwood claimed that he was shot after surrendering to police whilst unarmed.)

Eastwood pleaded guilty to 25 charges, including 16 counts of kidnapping, three counts of theft of a motor vehicle, three counts of using a firearm with intent to avoid lawful apprehension, one count of escaping lawful custody, one count of burglary, and one count of theft, with 10 other charges taken into consideration. He was sentenced on 8 November 1977 to 21 years' imprisonment with a non-parole period of 18 years, with Justice Murray ordering that the sentence be served consecutively with the balance of the sentence from the Faraday kidnapping; thus, the total effective sentence imposed in respect of both kidnappings was 25 years and 11 months' imprisonment with a non-parole period of 22 years and 11 months.

On 30 April 1981, Eastwood strangled convicted rapist Glen Davies in the exercise yard of Pentridge Prison and was charged with murder; he was subsequently acquitted on the grounds of self-defense, having been stabbed 10 times during the incident.

After remissions were abolished, Eastwood's application for a re-determination of his sentence was granted. Allowing for 17 months of remissions forfeited as a result of the 1976 escape, he was re-sentenced to 20 years and four months' imprisonment with a non-parole period of 18 years and four months.

Eastwood was released on parole in 1990. He was soon back in jail after being convicted of a burglary at a factory in Notting Hill. He stole chemicals that when combined would produce cyanide gas. He was eventually released in 1992 after choosing to decline parole offered in 1991 and worked as a truck driver. He was re-arrested in 2001.

== See also ==
- 1976 Chowchilla kidnapping
