= Minister of Forests =

Former ministry within the Cabinet of Victoria

Minister of Forests of Victoria
- Victorian coat of arms

- Flag of Victoria
- Style: The Honourable
- Member of: Parliament; Executive council
- Reports to: Premier
- Nominator: Premier
- Appointer: Governor on the recommendation of the premier
- Term length: At the governor's pleasure
- Inaugural holder: James McColl MP
- Formation: 5 December 1899
- Final holder: Kay Setches MP
- Abolished: 10 August 1990
- Succession: Minister for Conservation, Forests and Lands

The Minister of Forests was a ministry portfolio within the Executive Council of Victoria.

== Ministers ==
Order	MP	Party affiliation	Ministerial title	Term start	Term end	Time in office	Notes
1	James McColl MP		Minister of Forests	5 December 1899	19 November 1900	349 days	
2	Donald McLeod		Minister of Forests	16 February 1904	8 January 1909	4 years, 327 days	.
3	Peter McBride MP	Commonwealth Liberal	Minister of Forests	8 January 1909	19 February 1913	4 years, 42 days	
4	Alfred Billson MP	Commonwealth Liberal	Minister of Forests	19 February 1913	9 December 1913	293 days	
5	Alfred Richard Outtrim MP	Labor	Minister of Forests	9 December 1913	22 December 1913	13 days	
6	James Drysdale Brown MLC	Commonwealth Liberal	Minister of Forests	22 December 1913	9 November 1915	1 year, 322 days	
8	Thomas Livingston MP	Commonwealth Liberal	Minister of Forests	9 November 1915	29 November 1917	2 years, 20 days	
9	Alfred Downward MP	Nationalist	Minister of Forests	29 November 1917	21 March 1918	112 days	
10	William Hutchinson MP	Nationalist	Minister of Forests	21 March 1918	1 November 1920	2 years, 225 days	
11	Alexander Peacock MP	Nationalist	Minister of Forests	4 November 1920	28 April 1924	3 years, 176 days	
12	Richard Toutcher MP	Nationalist	Minister of Forests	28 April 1924	18 July 1924	81 days	
13	Daniel McNamara MLC	Labor	Minister of Forests	18 July 1924	18 November 1924	123 days	
14	Horace Richardson MLC	Nationals	Minister of Forests	18 November 1924	20 May 1927	2 years, 183 days	
15	William Beckett MLC	Labor	Minister of Forests	20 May 1927	22 November 1928	1 year, 186 days	
16	John Pennington MP	Nationalist	Minister of Forests	22 November 1928	12 December 1929	1 year, 20 days	
(15)	William Beckett MLC	Labor	Minister of Forests	12 December 1929	24 June 1931	1 year, 194 days	
17	Robert Williams MLC	Labor	Minister of Forests	24 June 1931	19 May 1932	330 days	
18	Albert Dunstan MP	United Country	Minister of Forests	19 May 1932	20 March 1935	2 years, 305 days	
19	Thomas Maltby MP	United Australia Party	Minister of Forests	20 March 1935	2 April 1935	13 days	
20	Albert Lind MP	United Country	Minister of Forests	2 April 1935	14 September 1943	8 years, 165 days	
(13)	Daniel McNamara MLC	Labor	Minister of Forests	14 September 1943	18 September 1943	4 days	
(20)	Albert Lind MP	United Country	Minister of Forests	18 September 1943	2 October 1945	2 years, 14 days	
21	William Everard MP	Liberal	Minister of Forests	2 October 1945	21 November 1945	50 days	
22	Bill Barry MP	Labor	Minister of Forests	21 November 1945	20 November 1947	1 year, 364 days	
23	Alexander Dennett MP	Liberal	Minister of Forests	20 November 1947	27 June 1950	2 years, 219 days	
(20)	Albert Lind MP	Country	Minister of Forests	27 June 1950	28 October 1952	2 years, 123 days	
(23)	Alexander Dennett MP	Electoral Reform League	Minister of Forests	28 October 1952	31 October 1952	3 days	
(20)	Albert Lind MP	Country	Minister of Forests	31 October 1952	17 December 1952	47 days	
24	John Galbally MLC	Labor	Minister of Forests	17 December 1952	7 July 1954	1 year, 202 days	
24	Don Ferguson MLC	Labor	Minister of Forests	7 July 1954	31 March 1955	267 days	
26	George Tilley MLC	Labor	Minister of Forests	31 March 1955	7 June 1955	68 days	
27	Robert Whately MP	Liberal Country Party	Minister of Forests	7 June 1955	17 March 1956	284 days	
28	Gilbert Chandler MLC	Liberal Country Party	Minister of Forests	21 March 1956	10 April 1956	20 days	
29	Gordon McArthur MLC	Liberal Country Party	Minister of Forests	10 April 1956	8 July 1958	2 years, 89 days	
30	Alexander Fraser MP	Liberal Country Party	Minister of Forests	16 July 1958	20 January 1959	188 days	
31	Murray Porter MP	Liberal Country Party	Minister of Forests	20 January 1959	26 July 1961	2 years, 187 days	
32	Lindsay Thompson MLC	Liberal Country Party	Minister of Forests	26 July 1961	9 May 1967	5 years, 287 days	
33	Edward Meagher MP	Liberal Country Party	Minister of Forests	9 May 1967	22 June 1973	6 years, 44 days	
34	Jock Granter MLC	Liberal	Minister of Forests	22 June 1973	5 June 1981	7 years, 348 days	
35	Tom Austin MP	Liberal	Minister of Forests	5 June 1981	8 April 1982	307 days	
36	Rod Mackenzie MLC	Labor	Minister of Forests	8 April 1982	1 September 1983	1 year, 146 days	
36	Rod Mackenzie MLC	Labor	Minister for Conservation, Forests and Lands From the 1 September 1983 the Forests Act (1958) was administered under an amalgamated Departmental structure. The Minister was still responsible for all the functions of the Act and remained the Minister for Forests for the purposes of legislation.	1 September 1983	2 May 1985	1 year, 243 days	
37	Joan Kirner MLC	Labor	Minister for Conservation, Forests and Lands From the 1 September 1983 the Forests Act (1958) was administered under an amalgamated Departmental structure. The Minister was still responsible for all the functions of the Act and remained the Minister for Forests for the purposes of legislation.	2 May 1985	13 October 1988	3 years, 164 days	
38	Kay Setches MP	Labor	Minister for Conservation, Forests and Lands From the 1 September 1983 the Forests Act (1958) was administered under an amalgamated Departmental structure. The Minister was still responsible for all the functions of the Act and remained the Minister for Forests for the purposes of legislation.	13 October 1988	2 April 1990	1 year, 301 days	
39	Steve Crabb	Labor	Minister for Conservation and Environment	2 April 1990	21 January 1992	1 year, 294 days	
40	Barry Pullen	Liberal	Minister for Conservation and Environment	21 January 1992	6 October 1992	259 days	
41	Mark A Birrell MLC	Liberal	Minister for Conservation and Environment	6 October 1992	23 March 1996	7 years, 2 weeks, 6 days	.
42	Marie T Tehan	Liberal	Minister for Conservation and Land Management	23 March 1996	21 October 1999		.
43	Sherryl M Garbutt	Labor	Minister for Environment and Conservation	21 October 1999	1 December 2006		.
44	Johnstone (John) W Thwaites	Labor	Minister for Water, Environment and Climate Change	1 December 2006	30 July 2007		.
45	Gavin W Jennings MLC	Labor	Minister for Environment and Climate Change	30 July 2007	2 December 2010		.
46	Ryan J Smith	Liberal	Minister for Environment and Climate Change	2 December 2010	November 2014		.
47	Jaala Pulford	Labor	Department of Environment, Land, Water and Planning	November 2014	2016		.
48	Lily D'Ambrosio	Labor	Department of Energy, Environment and Climate Action	2016			.
