= Richard Wynne =

Australian politician (born 1955)

The Honourable Richard Wynne
- Wynne in 2006

Minister for Housing
- In office 29 November 2018 – 27 June 2022
- Premier: Daniel Andrews
- Preceded by: Martin Foley
- Succeeded by: Lizzie Blandthorn
- In office 29 November 2006 – 2 December 2010
- Premier: Steve Bracks; John Brumby
- Preceded by: Candy Broad
- Succeeded by: Jeanette Powell

Minister for Planning
- In office 4 December 2014 – 27 June 2022
- Premier: Daniel Andrews
- Preceded by: Matthew Guy
- Succeeded by: Lizzie Blandthorn

Minister for Multicultural Affairs
- In office 29 November 2018 – 23 March 2020
- Premier: Daniel Andrews
- Preceded by: Robin Scott
- Succeeded by: Ros Spence

Minister for Local Government
- In office 29 November 2006 – 2 December 2010
- Premier: Steve Bracks; John Brumby
- Preceded by: Candy Broad
- Succeeded by: Jeanette Powell

Minister for Aboriginal Affairs
- In office 3 August 2007 – 2 December 2010
- Premier: John Brumby
- Preceded by: Gavin Jennings
- Succeeded by: Jeanette Powell

Member of the Victorian Legislative Assembly for Richmond
- In office 18 September 1999 – 25 November 2022
- Preceded by: Demetri Dollis
- Succeeded by: Gabrielle de Vietri

96th Lord Mayor of Melbourne
- In office 1990–1991
- Preceded by: William Deveney
- Succeeded by: Richard Meldrum

Personal details
- Born: 6 October 1955 (age 71) Melbourne, Victoria, Australia
- Party: Labor Party
- Occupation: Social worker
- Website: www.richardwynne.com.au

Richard William Wynne (born 6 October 1955) is an Australian former politician. He was a Labor Party member of the Victorian Legislative Assembly from 1999 to 2022, representing the electorate of Richmond. He served as the Minister for Planning between December 2014 and June 2022 and the Minister for Housing between November 2018 and June 2022. He also served as Minister for Multicultural Affairs between November 2018 and March 2020.

Wynne previously served as Parliamentary Secretary for Justice (1999–2002), Cabinet Secretary (2002–2006), Minister for Housing (2006–2010), Minister for Local Government (2006–2010) and Minister for Aboriginal Affairs (2007–2010) in the Bracks Ministry and Brumby Ministry. He is a member of the Labor Party and a member of the Socialist Left faction.

Prior to being elected to Parliament, Wynne was a social worker, an electorate officer and a ministerial adviser to state and federal Labor ministers. He was a councillor for the City of Melbourne 1986–1991, including a term as Lord Mayor of Melbourne 1990–1991.

== Childhood, education and early career ==
Richard Wynne grew up in the once working class, inner-city suburb of North Melbourne. He attended St. Joseph's Christian Brothers College in Queensberry Street, North Melbourne (later known as St Joseph's College, Melbourne). He completed his Higher School Certificate (HSC) in 1972.

Richard completed a Diploma in Youth Work in 1977 at Coburg State College, a Bachelor of Social Work in 1982 and a Diploma in Criminology in 1985 at the University of Melbourne. Pursuing a career in social justice, Richard Wynne worked as a Social Worker at the Flemington Community Health Centre from 1982 to 1988.

== Political career ==
=== Melbourne city councillor and Lord Mayor of Melbourne ===
Richard Wynne was elected to the Melbourne City Council representing North Melbourne wards from 1986 to 1991, and was elected as Lord Mayor of Melbourne from 1990 to 1991. During his term as Lord Mayor, he was part of Melbourne's unsuccessful bid for the 1996 Olympic Games (that was won by Atlanta). A keen sports fan, Wynne oversaw plans to rebuild the Great Southern Stand at the Melbourne Cricket Ground (MCG).

=== The Cain and Kirner state labor governments ===
He served as electorate officer (1988–90) to the Honourable Barry Pullen MLC, state member for Melbourne Province, (in the Cain state Labor government), and as ministerial adviser to Pullen when he was Minister for Housing in the succeeding Kirner Labor government 1990–91. He was an adviser to the Hon Andrew McCutcheon, MLA for St Kilda (abolished), Victorian Minister for Planning and Housing, from 1991 to 1992. The Kirner Labor government was defeated by the Liberal Party led by Jeff Kennett at the state election of 1992.

=== Keating federal Labor government ===
Richard served as senior adviser to Hon. Brian Howe MHR, federal member for Batman, Australian Minister for Health, Housing and Community Services, 1993–96. The Keating federal Labor government was defeated by the Liberal Party led by John Howard at the federal general election of 1996. In the years 1996–99 Richard Wynne was a consultant to local councils, preparation for his later career as Minister for Local Government.

=== State member for Richmond, the Bracks and Brumby state Labor governments ===
The state member for Richmond (1988–99), Demitri Dollis, was disendorsed by the Labor Party (Victorian Branch) in August 1999 after an extended stay out of the country, working with the newly elected Panhellenic Socialist Movement (PASOK) government in Greece. Richard Wynne was preselected for the now vacant seat of Richmond.

At the September 1999 Victorian state election, the statewide result was decided by three independents who supported the formation of the minority Bracks State Labor Government. Richard Wynne won the then safe Labor seat of Richmond comfortably. Richard Wynne was elected to the sub-cabinet post of Parliamentary Secretary for Justice after the election and served until the state election in 2002. The role assisting the reformist Attorney General Rob Hulls gave Richard the opportunity to push for law reform in the area of Gay and Lesbian Rights (a strong constituency in his inner-city seat).

The Bracks state Labor government was returned in a landslide result in 2002, but the new phenomenon of the Victorian Greens Party scoring strong results in the inner city seats of Melbourne saw Wynne go to preferences in the once-safe Labor seat. Previously Labor candidates in inner city seats would either win in their own right, or be helped over the line against Liberal candidates by (preferentially eliminated) Greens (and other) preferences. Richard was promoted to Cabinet Secretary in the Bracks state Labor government following the 2002 election, which he held until 2006.

At the 2006 Victorian state election, he achieved a better result than in 2002, after contesting the seat against the Greens and other opponents in a hard-fought campaign.

=== Minister for Housing, Minister for Local Government and Minister for Aboriginal Affairs ===
Following the successful re-election of the Bracks Labor Government in Victoria in November 2006, Richard Wynne was appointed by the Premier Steve Bracks to the twin roles of Minister for Housing (following in the footsteps of his mentor, Barry Pullen) and Minister for Local Government.

One of Wynne's stated goals as Minister for Housing is to solve the current rent crisis sweeping Australia, as investors turn to booming commodities and share markets for better return over the property market. In April 2007, Richard Wynne, as Local Government Minister, was central to the development of the groundbreaking Victorian Statewide Relationship Register as part of his ongoing involvement in Gay and Lesbian law reform.

After the unexpected resignation of Premier Steve Bracks and the subsequent appointing of new Premier John Brumby, Wynne was given a third portfolio as Minister for Aboriginal Affairs, as well as maintaining his previous roles of Minister for Housing and Minister for Local Government in Premier Brumby's new cabinet. He served in these roles until Labor lost the 2010 election.

=== 2014 to 2022 ===
Wynne was appointed Minister for Planning in the First Andrews Ministry in December 2014, and continued to hold the role in the Second Andrews Ministry. He was also appointed Minister for Housing and Minister for Multicultural Affairs in November 2018. He controversially approved apartment towers at Flemington Race Course in 2017. He relinquished the multicultural affairs portfolio in March 2020. In November 2021, Wynne announced he would retire at the 2022 state election. He continued to hold the planning and housing portfolios until stepping down on 27 June 2022.

== Other interests ==
The Victorian Parliament handbook lists Richard Wynne's interests as 'family and reading'. He is a keen supporter of Australian rules football, fencing, and hockey.

== Corkman pub case ==
Carlton Inn - Court case

Wynne started a case in 2016 to prosecute rogue developers that had demolished a heritage-listed pub, the Carlton Inn. Initially, the case saw the developers fined in Victorian Civil and Administrative Tribunal. However, in 2019, before the case was to appear in court, he cut a deal with the developers allowing them to build a 12-storey tower on the site instead of rebuilding the pub, as long as they did it by 2022, with possible financial benefits for the developers from the tower construction. This decision was harshly criticised by parties to the case, and the National Trust. Wynne also received criticism in the media, with Crikey's Guy Rundle saying that Wynne and the Labor government had "pathetically rolled over" to the developers. After the deal was concluded, the state opposition and various groups criticised the decision, with comments that Wynne had effectively "waved the white flag" to developers, possibly encouraging them to knock down further heritage-listed properties for further redevelopment. Both heritage groups and the state opposition demanded that the government compulsory acquire the land under section 172 of the Planning and Environment Act.

Civic offices
Preceded by William Deveney	Lord Mayor of Melbourne; 1990–1991	Succeeded by Richard Meldrum
Political offices
Preceded by Robert Dean	Parliamentary Secretary for Justice; 1999–2002	Succeeded by Jenny Mikakos
Preceded by Gavin Jennings	Cabinet Secretary; 2002–2006	Succeeded by Tony Robinson
Preceded by Candy Broad	Minister for Housing; 2006–2010	Succeeded by Wendy Lovell
Preceded by Candy Broad	Minister for Local Government; 2006–2010	Succeeded by Jeanette Powell
Preceded by Gavin Jennings	Minister for Aboriginal Affairs; 2006–2010	Succeeded by Jeanette Powell
Preceded by Matthew Guy	Minister for Planning; 2014–2022	Succeeded by Lizzie Blandthorn
Preceded by Martin Foley	Minister for Housing; 2018–2022	Succeeded by Danny Pearson
Preceded by Robin Scott	Minister for Multicultural Affairs; 2018–2020	Succeeded by Ros Spence
Victorian Legislative Assembly
Preceded by Demetri Dollis	Member for Richmond; 1999–2022	Succeeded by Gabrielle de Vietri
