= Minister for Tourism (Victoria) =

Australian state ministry portfolio

Minister for Tourism of Victoria
- Victorian coat of arms

- Flag of Victoria

- Incumbent; Natalie Suleyman MP since 15 April 2026
- Style: The Honourable
- Member of: Parliament; Executive council
- Reports to: Premier
- Nominator: Premier
- Appointer: Governor; on the recommendation of the premier
- Term length: At the governor's pleasure
- Inaugural holder: James Manson MP
- Formation: 4 February 1970
- Final holder: Steve Dimopoulos

The Minister for Tourism is a ministry portfolio within the Cabinet of Victoria.

== Ministers ==
Order	MP	Party affiliation	Ministerial title	Term start	Term end	Time in office
1	James Manson MP	Liberal	Minister for Tourism	4 February 1970	11 June 1970	127 days
2	Pat Dickie MLC	Liberal	Minister for Tourism	11 June 1970	23 August 1972	2 years, 73 days
3	Murray Byrne MLC	Liberal	Minister for Tourism	23 August 1972	31 March 1976	3 years, 221 days
4	Digby Crozier MLC	Liberal	Minister for Tourism	31 March 1976	23 May 1978	2 years, 53 days
4	Digby Crozier MLC	Liberal	Minister for State Development, Decentralization and Tourism	23 May 1978	16 May 1979	358 days
5	Rupert Hamer MP	Liberal	Minister for State Development, Decentralization and Tourism	16 May 1979	3 February 1981	1 year, 263 days
6	Ian Smith MP	Liberal	Minister for State Development, Decentralization and Tourism	3 February 1981	15 March 1981	40 days
(5)	Rupert Hamer MP	Liberal	Minister for State Development, Decentralization and Tourism	15 March 1981	17 March 1981	2 days
(6)	Ian Smith MP	Liberal	Minister for State Development, Decentralization and Tourism	17 March 1981	25 May 1981	69 days
7	Jim Ramsay MP	Liberal	Minister for State Development, Decentralization and Tourism	25 May 1981	5 June 1981	11 days
8	Graeme Weideman MP	Liberal	Minister for State Development, Decentralization and Tourism	5 June 1981	1 July 1981	26 days
8	Graeme Weideman MP	Liberal	Minister for Tourism	1 July 1981	8 April 1982	281 days
9	William Landeryou MLC	Labor	Minister for Tourism	8 April 1982	21 December 1982	257 days
10	Frank Wilkes MP	Labor	Minister for Tourism	14 December 1987	13 October 1988	304 days
11	Steve Crabb MP	Labor	Minister for Tourism	13 October 1988	6 October 1992	3 years, 359 days
12	Patrick McNamara MP	Liberal	Minister for Tourism	6 October 1992	3 April 1996	3 years, 180 days
13	Louise Asher MLC	Liberal	Minister for Tourism	3 April 1996	20 October 1999	3 years, 200 days
14	John Pandazopoulos MP	Labor	Minister for Major Projects and Tourism	20 October 1999	12 February 2002	2 years, 115 days
14	John Pandazopoulos MP	Labor	Minister for Tourism	12 February 2002	1 December 2006	4 years, 292 days
15	Tim Holding MP	Labor	Minister for Tourism	1 December 2006	3 August 2007	245 days
15	Tim Holding MP	Labor	Minister for Tourism and Major Events	3 August 2007	2 December 2010	3 years, 121 days
(13)	Louise Asher MP	Liberal	Minister for Tourism and Major Events	2 December 2010	4 December 2014	4 years, 2 days
16	John Eren MP	Labor	Minister for Tourism and Major Events	4 December 2014	29 November 2018	3 years, 360 days
17	Martin Pakula MP	Labor	Minister for Tourism, Sport and Major Events	29 November 2018	27 June 2022	3 years, 210 days
18	Steve Dimopoulos MP	Labor	Minister for Tourism, Sport and Major Events	27 June 2022	27 September 2023	1 year, 92 days
18	Steve Dimopoulos MP	Labor	Minister for Tourism	2 October 2023	15 April 2026	2 years, 195 days
19	Natalie Suleyman MP	Labor	Minister for Tourism	15 April 2026	Incumbent	219 days

== See also ==
- Minister for Tourism (Australia)
  - Minister for Tourism, Major Events, Hospitality and Racing (New South Wales)
  - Minister for Tourism (Western Australia)
