= Barry Pullen =

Australian politician (1939–2024)

Barry Thomas Pullen (1 November 1939 − 26 June 2024) was an Australian politician. He was a minister in the Cain and Kirner Labor Victorian State Governments, and held the Legislative Council seat of Melbourne in the Victorian Parliament from 1982 to 1999.

== Early life ==
Pullen was born in 1939 in Melbourne, Victoria to parents Thomas Pullen, a fibrous plasterer, and Ellen Roderick. He married Margaret Ackerly, and they had three daughters. Pullen attended Moreland State School, Moreland Central School, Coburg High School. He studied at University of Melbourne and RMIT to become a civil engineer.

== Political career ==
Pullen joined the Labor Party in 1968 as a member of the Socialist Left faction.

He was a founding member of the Fitzroy Residents Association and Fitzroy city councillor 1972–1976. He was very active in campaigning against the high rise Housing Commission of Victoria flats being built in the 1950s and 1960s. He was employed as survey assistant, draftsman, technical officer, civil engineer and then Victorian director of Department of Environment, Housing and Community Development, before being elected to the Victorian Parliament in 1982.

Pullen was Minister for Housing and Construction from 1988 to 1990. Additionally, he was appointed Minister for Agriculture and Rural Affairs and Minister for the Arts in 1989. In 1990, he became Minister for Education, then Minister for Education and Training in 1991, as well as Minister for Conservation and Environment in 1992.

After the loss by Labor at the state election of 1992, Pullen became shadow Minister for Natural Resources and Shadow Minister for Conservation and Environment. Later, he served as shadow Minister for Conservation and Resource Management from 1993 to 1994, and shadow Minister for Environment from 1994 to 1996. He retired from Parliament in 1999, but remained active in the local community and the Australian Labor Party.

== Death ==
Pullen died on 26 June 2024, at the age of 84.

Victorian Legislative Council
Preceded by Ivan Trayling	Member for Melbourne Province; 1982–1999	Succeeded by Gavin Jennings
Political offices
Preceded by Ronald "Bunna" Walsh	Minister for Housing and Construction; 1988–1990	Succeeded by Tony Sheehan
Preceded by Robert Fordham	Minister for Agriculture and Rural Affairs; 1989	Succeeded by Barry Rowe
Preceded by Robert Fordham	Minister for the Arts; 1989	Succeeded by Evan Walker
Preceded by Joan Kirner	Minister for Education; 1990–1991	Succeeded by Neil Pope
Preceded by Evan Walker	Minister for Education and Training; 1991–1992	Succeeded by Tom Roper
Preceded by Steve Crabb	Minister for Conservation and Environment; 1992	Succeeded by Mark Birrell
