= Minister for Labour (Victoria) =

Australian state ministry portfolio

Minister for Labour of Victoria
- Victorian coat of arms

- Flag of Victoria
- Style: The Honourable
- Member of: Parliament; Executive council
- Reports to: Premier
- Nominator: Premier
- Appointer: Governor on the recommendation of the premier
- Term length: At the governor's pleasure
- Inaugural holder: Alexander Peacock MP
- Formation: 19 November 1900
- Final holder: Neil Pope MP
- Abolished: 6 October 1992
- Succession: Minister for Industrial Relations

The Minister for Labour was a ministry portfolio within the Executive Council of Victoria. The portfolio was originally held by Alexander Peacock in the Second Turner ministry from 19 November 1900. At the dissolution of the Kirner ministry on 6 October 1992 the position was disestablished. The role was held by the Minister for Industrial Relations from 1999.

== Ministers ==
| Order | MP | Party affiliation | Ministerial title | Term start | Term end | Time in office | Notes |
|---|---|---|---|---|---|---|---|
| 1 | Alexander Peacock MP | Non-Party Liberalism | Minister of Labour | 19 November 1900 | 12 February 1901 | 85 days | |
| 2 | John Murray MP | Reform | Minister of Labour | 10 June 1902 | 19 February 1904 | 1 year, 254 days | |
| 3 | Sir Samuel Gillott MP | Reform | Minister of Labour | 19 February 1904 | 4 December 1906 | 2 years, 288 days | |
| 4 | John Mackey MP | Reform | Minister of Labour | 11 December 1906 | 4 January 1907 | 24 days | |
| 5 | Thomas Langdon MP | Reform | Minister of Labour | 4 January 1907 | 22 February 1907 | 49 days | |
| (1) | Alexander Peacock MP | Reform | Minister of Labour | 22 February 1907 | 20 October 1908 | 1 year, 241 days | |
| (4) | John Mackey MP | Reform | Minister of Labour | 31 October 1908 | 8 January 1909 | 69 days | |
| (2) | John Murray MP | Commonwealth Liberal | Minister of Labour | 8 January 1909 | 19 April 1911 | 2 years, 101 days | |
| 6 | William Watt MP | Commonwealth Liberal | Minister of Labour | 19 April 1911 | 13 October 1911 | 177 days | |
| (2) | John Murray MP | Commonwealth Liberal | Minister of Labour | 13 October 1911 | 19 February 1913 | 1 year, 129 days | |
| (1) | Sir Alexander Peacock MP | Commonwealth Liberal | Minister of Labour | 19 February 1913 | 9 December 1913 | 293 days | |
| 7 | John Lemmon MP | Labor | Minister of Labour | 9 December 1913 | 22 December 1913 | 13 days | |
| (1) | Sir Alexander Peacock MP | Commonwealth Liberal | Minister of Labour | 22 December 1913 | 10 August 1915 | 1 year, 231 days | |
| (2) | John Murray MP | Commonwealth Liberal | Minister of Labour | 10 August 1915 | 9 November 1915 | 91 days | |
| (1) | Sir Alexander Peacock MP | Commonwealth Liberal | Minister of Labour | 9 November 1915 | 29 November 1917 | 2 years, 20 days | |
| (1) | Sir Alexander Peacock MP | Nationalist | Minister of Labour | 9 November 1915 | 29 November 1917 | 2 years, 20 days | |
| 8 | John Bowser MP | Nationalist | Minister of Labour | 29 November 1917 | 21 March 1918 | 112 days | |
| 9 | Harry Lawson MP | Nationalist | Minister of Labour | 21 March 1918 | 7 July 1919 | 1 year, 108 days | |
| 10 | Matthew Baird MP | Nationalist | Minister of Labour | 7 July 1919 | 4 November 1920 | 1 year, 120 days | |
| (1) | Sir Alexander Peacock MP | Nationalist | Minister of Labour | 4 November 1920 | 18 July 1924 | 3 years, 257 days | |
| (7) | John Lemmon MP | Labor | Minister of Labour | 18 July 1924 | 18 November 1924 | 123 days | |
| (1) | Sir Alexander Peacock MP | Nationalist | Minister of Labour | 18 November 1924 | 20 May 1927 | 2 years, 183 days | |
| (7) | John Lemmon MP | Labor | Minister of Labour | 20 May 1927 | 22 November 1928 | 1 year, 186 days | |
| 11 | Frank Groves MP | Nationalist | Minister of Labour | 22 November 1928 | 10 December 1929 | 1 year, 18 days | |
| 12 | Henry Beardmore MP | Nationalist | Minister of Labour | 10 December 1929 | 12 December 1929 | 2 days | |
| (7) | John Lemmon MP | Labor | Minister of Labour | 12 December 1929 | 1 March 1932 | 2 years, 80 days | |
| 13 | Robert Williams MLC | Labor | Minister of Labour | 1 March 1932 | 19 May 1932 | 79 days | |
| 14 | George Goudie MLC | Country | Minister of Labour | 19 May 1932 | 25 July 1934 | 2 years, 67 days | |
| 15 | Wilfrid Kent Hughes MP | United Australia Party | Minister of Labour | 25 July 1934 | 2 April 1935 | 251 days | |
| 16 | Murray Bourchier MP | Country | Minister of Labour | 2 April 1935 | 22 June 1936 | 1 year, 81 days | |
| 17 | Henry Bailey MP | Country | Minister of Labour | 22 June 1936 | 29 July 1936 | 37 days | |
| 18 | Edwin Mackrell MP | Country | Minister of Labour | 29 July 1936 | 14 September 1943 | 7 years, 47 days | |
| 19 | Percy Clarey MLC | Labor | Minister of Labour | 14 September 1943 | 18 September 1943 | 4 days | |
| 20 | Thomas Hollway MP | United Australia Party | Minister of Labour | 18 September 1943 | 2 October 1945 | 2 years, 14 days | |
| 20 | Thomas Hollway MP | Liberal | Minister of Labour | 18 September 1943 | 2 October 1945 | 2 years, 14 days | |
| 21 | Leslie Hollins MP | Independent | Minister of Labour | 2 October 1945 | 21 November 1945 | 50 days | |
| (19) | Percy Clarey MLC | Labor | Minister of Labour | 21 November 1945 | 20 November 1947 | 1 year, 364 days | |
| 22 | Herbert Hyland MP | Country | Minister of Labour | 20 November 1947 | 3 December 1948 | 1 year, 13 days | |
| 23 | Alexander Dennett MP | Liberal | Minister of Labour | 3 December 1948 | 8 December 1948 | 5 days | |
| 24 | Allan McDonald MLC | Liberal | Minister of Labour | 8 December 1948 | 27 June 1950 | 1 year, 201 days | |
| 24 | Allan McDonald MLC | Liberal and Country | Minister of Labour | 8 December 1948 | 27 June 1950 | 1 year, 201 days | |
| 25 | Trevor Harvey MLC | Country | Minister of Labour | 27 June 1950 | 28 October 1952 | 2 years, 123 days | |
| 26 | John Don MP | Electoral Reform League | Minister of Labour | 28 October 1952 | 31 October 1952 | 3 days | |
| (25) | Trevor Harvey MLC | Country | Minister of Labour | 31 October 1952 | 17 December 1952 | −14 days | |
| 27 (Note: Part of these terms were served concurrently) | Archibald Fraser MLC | Labor | Minister of Labour | 17 December 1952 | 21 June 1954 | 1 year, 186 days | |
| 28 | John Galbally MLC | Labor | Minister of Labour and Industry | 7 July 1954 | 7 June 1955 | 335 days | |
| 29 | William Leggatt MP | Liberal and Country | Minister of Labour and Industry | 7 June 1955 | 8 June 1955 | 1 day | |
| 30 | John Bloomfield MP | Liberal and Country | Minister of Labour and Industry | 8 June 1955 | 14 February 1956 | 221 days | |
| 31 | George Reid MP | Liberal and Country | Minister of Labour and Industry | 14 February 1956 | 1 December 1965 | 9 years, 290 days | |
| 31 | George Reid MP | Liberal | Minister of Labour and Industry | 14 February 1956 | 1 December 1965 | 9 years, 290 days | |
| 32 | Vernon Wilcox MP | Liberal | Minister of Labour and Industry | 1 December 1965 | 9 May 1967 | 1 year, 159 days | |
| 33 | John Rossiter MP | Liberal | Minister of Labour and Industry | 9 May 1967 | 11 June 1970 | 3 years, 33 days | |
| 34 | Joe Rafferty MP | Liberal | Minister of Labour and Industry | 11 June 1970 | 31 March 1976 | 5 years, 294 days | |
| 35 | Rob Maclellan MP | Liberal | Minister of Labour and Industry | 31 March 1976 | 18 August 1978 | 2 years, 140 days | |
| 36 | Jim Ramsay MP | Liberal | Minister of Labour and Industry | 18 August 1978 | 8 April 1982 | 3 years, 233 days | |
| 37 | Rob Jolly MP | Labor | Minister of Labour and Industry | 8 April 1982 | 21 December 1982 | 257 days | |
| 38 | Bill Landeryou MLC | Labor | Minister of Labour and Industry | 21 December 1982 | 31 August 1983 | 253 days | |
| 39 | Steve Crabb MP | Labor | Minister of Labour and Industry | 31 August 1983 | 8 September 1983 | 8 days | |
| 40 | Jack Simpson MP | Labor | Minister of Labour and Industry | 8 September 1983 | 2 May 1985 | 1 year, 236 days | |
| (39) | Steve Crabb MP | Labor | Minister for Labour | 8 April 1986 | 13 October 1988 | 2 years, 188 days | |
| 41 | Neil Pope MP | Labor | Minister for Labour | 13 October 1988 | 6 October 1992 | 3 years, 359 days | |
