= Minister for Housing (Victoria) =

Minister for Housing and Building of Victoria
- Victorian coat of arms

- Flag of Victoria

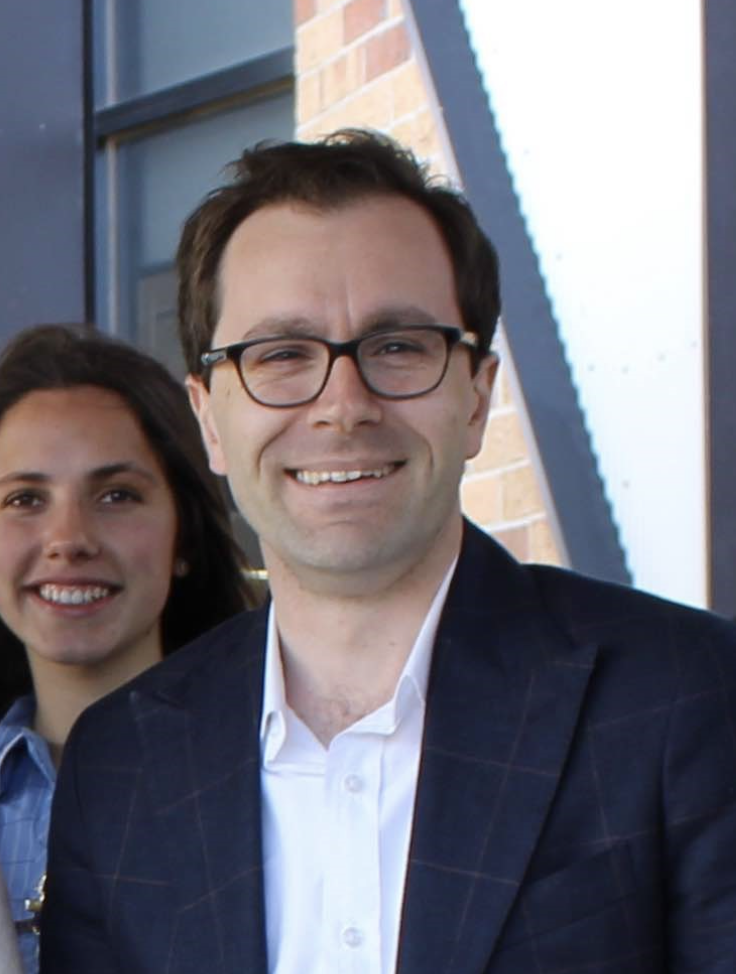
- Incumbent; Nick Staikos since 15 April 2026
- Department of Families, Fairness and Housing
- Style: The Honourable
- Member of: Parliament; Executive council
- Reports to: Premier
- Nominator: Premier
- Appointer: Governor; on the recommendation of the Premier
- Term length: At the governor's pleasure
- Formation: 2 October 1945
- First holder: William Haworth

In the Victorian political system, the State Minister for Housing and Building is a State Government cabinet position responsible for Housing. The Minister for Housing and Building is responsible for the Office of Housing (formerly the Victorian Housing Commission); and is one of six state ministers responsible for the Victorian Department of Families, Fairness and Housing (DFFH).

The Housing Commission of Victoria was established in 1938. Its stated purpose of improving existing housing and to provide adequate housing for people of limited means (public housing). The Commission ceased to exist in 1984, as it became the Office of Housing. Housing Commission remains the common colloquial term for public housing estates and developments in Victoria, particularly the inner city tower estates built in the late 1950s and 1960s by Liberal State Governments.

The Housing Commission towers were planned as a major capital work solution to urban ghettoisation. These 20-storey towers loom over many of the inner suburbs in Melbourne and are usually built in 2–6 tower configurations. Many blocks of occupied terrace and worker cottage style housing were cleared and towers of 10 apartments a floor built, surrounded by gardens and car parks. The future high property value of the former types of housing and the gentrification of inner urban areas was not foreseen. Opponents of these projects claimed that the towers were merely turning the slums upright. One of the more vocal anti-tower campaigners in the 1960s, Barry Pullen, later became a Minister for Housing in the Cain Labor Government. Crime and substance abuse problems on the estates have indeed fluctuated to high levels over the years, as different governments apply policies to renew the residential environments.

The Victorian Minister for Housing was at the centre of the Victorian land scandals of 1973–82.

The Victorian Minister for Housing and Building is also responsible for homelessness and the Residential Tenancies Act (the laws governing domestic renting in Victoria). Today the Office of Housing is Victoria's largest landlord, and is responsible for around 73,000 properties (23,000+ in regional Victorian towns and rural communities, 7,000+ inner city high-rise flats, 40,000+ houses, units and flats across suburban Melbourne, 1,700+ rooming house rooms and 1,800 moveable units).

== Victorian State Ministers for Housing and Building ==
Order	Minister	Party affiliation	Ministerial title	Term start	Term end	Time in office	Notes
1	Sir William Haworth	Liberal	Minister of Housing	2 October 1945	21 November 1945	50 days	
2	Bill Barry	Labor	Minister of Housing	21 November 1945	20 November 1947	1 year, 364 days	
3	Sir Arthur Warner	Liberal Country	Minister in Charge of Housing	20 November 1947	27 June 1950	2 years, 219 days	
4	Ivan Swinburne	Country	Minister in Charge of Housing	27 June 1950	28 October 1952	2 years, 123 days	
5	William Dawnay-Mould	Liberal Country	Minister in Charge of Housing	28 October 1952	31 October 1952	3 days	
(4)	Ivan Swinburne	Country	Minister in Charge of Housing	1 October 1952	17 December 1952	77 days	
6	Tom Hayes	Labor	Minister in Charge of Housing	17 December 1952	31 March 1955	2 years, 104 days	
7	John Sheehan	Labor	Minister in Charge of Housing	31 March 1955	7 June 1955	68 days	
8	Sir Thomas Maltby	Liberal Country	Minister of Housing	7 June 1955	8 June 1955	1 day	
9	Sir Horace Petty	Liberal	Minister of Housing	8 June 1955	26 July 1961	6 years, 48 days	
10	Lindsay Thompson	Liberal	Minister of Housing	26 July 1961	9 May 1967	5 years, 287 days	
11	Edward Meagher	Liberal	Minister of Housing	9 May 1967	23 August 1972	5 years, 106 days	
12	Vance Dickie	Liberal	Minister of Housing	23 August 1972	31 March 1976	3 years, 282 days	
13	Geoff Hayes	Liberal	Minister of Housing	31 March 1976	16 May 1979	3 years, 46 days	
14	Brian Dixon	Liberal	Minister of Housing	16 May 1979	3 February 1981	1 year, 263 days	
15	Jeff Kennett	Liberal	Minister of Housing	3 February 1981	8 April 1982	1 year, 64 days	
16	Ian Cathie	Labor	Minister of Housing	8 April 1982	2 May 1985	3 years, 24 days	
17	Frank Wilkes	Labor	Minister for Housing	2 May 1985	14 December 1987	2 years, 226 days	
18	Bunna Walsh	Labor	Minister for Housing and Construction	14 December 1987	13 October 1988	304 days	
19	Barry Pullen	Labor	Minister for Housing and Construction	13 October 1988	10 August 1990	1 year, 301 days	
20	Tony Sheehan	Labor	Minister for Housing and Construction	10 August 1990	18 January 1991	161 days	
21	Andrew McCutcheon	Labor	Minister for Planning and Housing	18 January 1991	6 October 1992	1 year, 262 days	
22	Rob Knowles	Liberal	Minister for Housing	6 October 1992	3 April 1996	3 years, 180 days	
23	Ann Henderson	Liberal	Minister for Housing	3 April 1996	20 October 1999	3 years, 200 days	
24	Bronwyn Pike	Labor	Minister for Housing	20 October 1999	5 December 2002	3 years, 46 days	
25	Candy Broad	Labor	Minister for Housing	5 December 2002	1 December 2006	3 years, 361 days	
26	Richard Wynne	Labor	Minister for Housing	1 December 2006	2 December 2010	4 years, 0 days	
27	Wendy Lovell	Liberal	Minister for Housing	2 December 2010	4 December 2014	4 years, 2 days	
28	Martin Foley	Labor	Minister for Housing, Disability and Ageing	4 December 2014	29 November 2018	3 years, 360 days	
(26)	Richard Wynne	Labor	Minister for Housing	29 November 2018	27 June 2022	3 years, 210 days	
29	Danny Pearson	Labor	Minister for Housing	27 June 2022	5 December 2022	161 days	
30	Colin Brooks	Labor	Minister for Housing	5 December 2022	2 October 2023	301 days	
31	Harriet Shing	Labor	Minister for Housing and Building	2 October 2023	15 April 2026	2 years, 195 days	
32	Nick Staikos	Labor	Minister for Housing and Building	15 April 2026	Incumbent	205 days	

== See also ==
- Public housing in Australia
- Minister for Housing (Australia)
- Minister for Housing (New South Wales)
- Minister for Housing (Western Australia)
