= Minister for Water (Victoria) =

Minister for Water of Victoria
- Victorian coat of arms

- Flag of Victoria
- Incumbent; Gayle Tierney MLC since 19 December 2024
- Department of Environment and Primary Industries
- Style: The Honourable
- Member of: Parliament; Executive council
- Reports to: Premier
- Nominator: Premier
- Appointer: Governor on the recommendation of the premier
- Term length: At the governor's pleasure
- Inaugural holder: Robert Clark MP
- Formation: 2 April 1880

The Minister for Water is a minister within the Executive Council of Victoria.

== Ministers ==
Order	MP	Party affiliation	Ministerial title	Term start	Term end	Time in office	Notes
1	Robert Clark MP	Colonial Victoria	Commissioner of Water Supply	2 April 1880	3 August 1880	123 days	
2	Charles Young MP	Colonial Victoria	Minister of Water Supply and Agriculture	9 July 1881	8 March 1883	1 year, 242 days	
3	Alfred Deakin MP	Colonial Victoria	Commissioner of Water Supply	8 March 1884	23 April 1884	46 days	
4	Frederick Thomas Sargood MLC	Colonial Victoria	Commissioner of Water Supply	23 April 1884	18 February 1886	1 year, 301 days	
(3)	Alfred Deakin MP	Colonial Victoria	Commissioner of Water Supply	18 February 1886	5 November 1890	4 years, 260 days	
5	George Graham MP	Colonial Victoria	Minister of Water Supply	5 November 1890	23 January 1893	2 years, 79 days	
6	James McColl MP	Colonial Victoria	Minister of Water Supply	23 January 1893	27 September 1894	1 year, 247 days	
7	Henry Foster MP	Colonial Victoria	Minister of Water Supply	28 September 1894	5 December 1899	5 years, 68 days	
8	Alfred Richard Outtrim MP	Colonial Victoria	Minister of Mines and Water Supply	5 December 1899	19 November 1900	349 days	
9	John Burton MP	Colonial Victoria	Minister of Mines and Water Supply	19 November 1900	10 June 1902	1 year, 203 days	
10	Ewen Hugh Cameron MP	Reform	Minister of Mines and Water Supply	10 June 1902	16 February 1904	1 year, 251 days	
11	Donald McLeod MP	Reform	Minister of Water Supply	10 March 1904	26 April 1904	47 days	
12	George Swinburne MP	Reform	Minister of Water Supply	26 April 1904	31 October 1908	4 years, 188 days	
13	Alfred Downward MP	Reform	Minister of Water Supply	31 October 1908	8 January 1909	69 days	
(5)	George Graham MP	Commonwealth Liberal	Minister of Water Supply	8 January 1909	9 December 1913	4 years, 335 days	
14	William Plain MP	Labor	Minister of Water Supply	9 December 1913	22 December 1913	13 days	
15	William Hutchinson MP	Commonwealth Liberal	Minister of Water Supply	22 December 1913	9 November 1915	1 year, 322 days	
16	Hugh McKenzie MP	Commonwealth Liberal	Minister of Water Supply	9 November 1915	29 November 1917	2 years, 20 days	
17	Frank Clarke MLC	Nationalist	Minister of Water Supply	29 November 1917	22 February 1921	3 years, 85 days	
18	Harry Lawson MP	Nationalist	Minister of Water Supply	22 February 1921	27 February 1924	3 years, 5 days	
19	Frederic Eggleston MP	Nationalist	Minister of Water Supply	27 February 1924	19 March 1924	21 days	
20	John Gordon MP	Nationalist	Minister of Water Supply	19 March 1924	18 July 1924	121 days	
21	Henry Bailey MP	Labor	Minister of Water Supply	18 July 1924	18 November 1924	123 days	
22	John Allan MP	Country	Minister of Water Supply	18 November 1924	20 May 1927	2 years, 183 days	
(21)	Henry Bailey MP	Labor	Minister of Water Supply	20 May 1927	22 November 1928	1 year, 186 days	
23	Henry Angus MP	Nationalist	Minister of Water Supply	22 November 1928	12 December 1929	1 year, 20 days	
(21)	Henry Bailey MP	Labor	Minister of Water Supply	12 December 1929	19 May 1932	2 years, 159 days	
24	George Goudie MLC	Country	Minister of Water Supply	19 May 1932	20 March 1935	2 years, 305 days	
25	Henry Cohen MLC	United Australia Party	Minister of Water Supply	20 March 1935	2 April 1935	13 days	
26	Francis Old MP	United Country	Minister of Water Supply	2 April 1935	14 September 1943	8 years, 165 days	
27	Daniel McNamara MLC	Labor	Minister of Water Supply	14 September 1943	18 September 1943	4 days	
28	John McDonald MP	Country	Minister of Water Supply	18 September 1943	2 October 1945	2 years, 14 days	
29	Edwin Mackrell MP	Country	Minister of Water Supply	2 October 1945	21 November 1945	50 days	
30	Bill Galvin MP	Labor	Minister of Water Supply	21 November 1945	20 November 1947	1 year, 364 days	
(28)	John McDonald MP	Country	Minister of Water Supply	20 November 1947	3 December 1948	1 year, 13 days	
31	Thomas Hollway MP	Liberal	Minister of Water Supply	3 December 1948	8 December 1948	5 days	
32	Henry Bolte MP	Liberal	Minister of Water Supply	8 December 1948	27 June 1950	1 year, 201 days	
33	Richard Brose MP	Country	Minister of Water Supply	27 June 1950	28 October 1952	2 years, 123 days	
34	John Hipworth MP	Electoral Reform League	Minister of Water Supply	28 October 1952	31 October 1952	3 days	
(33)	Richard Brose MP	Country	Minister of Water Supply	31 October 1952	17 December 1952	47 days	
35	Clive Stoneham MP	Labor	Minister of Water Supply	17 December 1952	7 June 1955	2 years, 172 days	
36	Wilfred Mibus MP	Liberal Country Party	Minister of Water Supply	7 June 1955	18 April 1964	8 years, 316 days	
(32)	Henry Bolte MP	Liberal Country Party	Minister of Water Supply	22 April 1964	28 April 1964	6 days	
37	Jim Balfour MP	Liberal Country Party	Minister of Water Supply	28 April 1964	27 June 1964	60 days	
38	Tom Darcy MP	Liberal Country Party	Minister of Water Supply	27 June 1964	9 May 1967	2 years, 316 days	
39	Bill Borthwick MP	Liberal Country Party	Minister of Water Supply	9 May 1967	11 June 1970	3 years, 33 days	
40	Ian Smith MP	Liberal Country Party	Minister of Water Supply	11 June 1970	23 August 1972	2 years, 73 days	
41	Roberts Dunstan MP	Liberal	Minister of Water Supply	23 August 1972	22 June 1973	303 days	
42	Jock Granter MLC	Liberal	Minister of Water Supply	22 June 1973	5 June 1981	7 years, 348 days	
43	Glyn Jenkins MLC	Liberal	Minister of Water Supply	5 June 1981	8 April 1982	307 days	
44	David White MLC	Labor	Minister of Water Supply	8 April 1982	2 May 1985	3 years, 24 days	
45	Andrew McCutcheon MP	Labor	Minister for Water Resources	2 May 1985	14 December 1987	2 years, 226 days	
46	Frank Wilkes MP	Labor	Minister for Water Resources	14 December 1987	13 October 1988	304 days	
47	Bunna Walsh MP	Labor	Minister for Water Resources	13 October 1988	10 August 1990	1 year, 301 days	
48	Steven Crabb MP	Labor	Minister for Water Resources	28 January 1992	6 October 1992	252 days	
49	John Thwaites MP	Labor	Minister for Water, Environment and Climate Change	5 December 2002	30 July 2007	4 years, 237 days	
50	John Brumby MP	Labor	Minister for Water, Environment and Climate Change	30 July 2007	3 August 2007	4 days	
51	Tim Holding MP	Labor	Minister for Water	3 August 2007	2 December 2010	3 years, 121 days	
52	Peter Walsh MP	Nationals	Minister for Water	2 December 2010	4 December 2014	4 years, 2 days	
53	Lisa Neville MP	Labor	Minister for Environment, Climate Change and Water	4 December 2014	23 May 2016	1 year, 171 days	
53	Lisa Neville MP	Labor	Minister for Water	23 May 2016	27 June 2022	6 years, 35 days	
54	Harriet Shing MLC	Labor	Minister for Water	27 June 2022	19 December 2024	2 years, 175 days	
55	Gayle Tierney MLC	Labor	Minister for Water	19 December 2024	15 April 2026	1 year, 117 days	
(54)	Harriet Shing MLC	Labor	Minister for Water	15 April 2026	Incumbent	145 days	

== See also ==
- Minister for the Environment and Water (Australia)
  - Minister for Water (Western Australia)
  - Minister for Water (New South Wales)
