= Minister for Creative Industries =

Australian state ministry portfolio in Victoria

Minister for Creative Industries of Victoria
- Victorian coat of arms

- Flag of Victoria
- Incumbent; Colin Brooks MP since 2 October 2023
- Style: The Honourable
- Member of: Parliament; Executive council
- Reports to: Premier
- Nominator: Premier
- Appointer: Governor on the recommendation of the premier
- Term length: At the governor's pleasure
- Precursor: Minister for the Arts; Minister for Arts
- Inaugural holder: Rupert Hamer MP
- Formation: 23 August 1972

The Minister for Creative Industries is a minister within the Executive Council of Victoria, Australia. It was formerly known as the Minister for the Arts up until the Andrews Government.

== Ministers ==
Order	MP	Party affiliation	Ministerial title	Term start	Term end	Time in office	Notes
1	Rupert Hamer MP	Liberal	Minister for the Arts	23 August 1972	16 May 1979	6 years, 266 days	
2	Norman Lacy MP	Liberal	Minister for the Arts	16 May 1979	8 April 1982	2 years, 327 days	
3	Race Mathews MP	Labor	Minister for the Arts	8 April 1982	14 December 1987	5 years, 250 days	
4	Ian Cathie MP	Labor	Minister for the Arts	14 December 1987	13 October 1988	304 days	
5	Robert Fordham MP	Labor	Minister for the Arts	13 October 1988	31 January 1989	110 days	
6	Evan Walker MLC	Labor	Minister for the Arts	7 February 1989	10 August 1990	1 year, 184 days	
7	Jim Kennan MP	Labor	Minister for the Arts	10 August 1990	6 October 1992	2 years, 57 days	
8	Haddon Storey MLC	Liberal	Minister for the Arts	6 October 1992	3 April 1996	3 years, 180 days	
9	Jeffrey Kennett MP	Liberal	Minister for the Arts	3 April 1996	20 October 1999	3 years, 200 days	
10	Mary Delahunty MP	Labor	Minister for Arts	20 October 1999	1 December 2006	7 years, 42 days	
10	Mary Delahunty MP	Labor	Minister for the Arts	20 October 1999	1 December 2006	7 years, 42 days	
11	Lynne Kosky MP	Labor	Minister for the Arts	1 December 2006	20 January 2010	3 years, 50 days	
12	Peter Batchelor MP	Labor	Minister for the Arts	20 January 2010	2 December 2010	316 days	
13	Edward Baillieu MP	Liberal	Minister for the Arts	2 December 2010	6 March 2013	2 years, 94 days	
14	Heidi Victoria MP	Liberal	Minister for the Arts	13 March 2013	4 December 2014	1 year, 266 days	
15	Martin Foley MP	Labor	Minister for Creative Industries	4 December 2014	29 September 2020	5 years, 300 days	
16	Danny Pearson MP	Labor	Minister for Creative Industries	29 September 2020	27 June 2022	1 year, 271 days	
17	Steve Dimopoulos MP	Labor	Minister for Creative Industries	27 June 2022	2 October 2023	1 year, 97 days	
18	Colin Brooks MP	Labor	Minister for Creative Industries	2 October 2023	Incumbent	2 years, 340 days	

== See also ==
- Minister for the Arts (Australia)
  - Minister for the Arts (New South Wales)
  - Minister for the Arts (Northern Territory)
  - Minister for the Arts (Western Australia)
