= Deputy Premier of Victoria =

Government position in Australia

- Victorian coat of arms

- Flag of Victoria

- Incumbent; Gabrielle Williams since 28 July 2026
- Department of Premier and Cabinet
- Style: The Honourable
- Member of: Parliament; Cabinet; Executive Council
- Reports to: Premier of Victoria
- Seat: 1 Treasury Place, Melbourne
- Nominator: Premier of Victoria
- Appointer: Governor of Victoria; on the advice of the premier
- Term length: At the governor's pleasure; contingent on serving as deputy leader of party or coalition commanding a majority of seats in the Legislative Assembly
- Formation: 19 May 1932
- First holder: Robert Menzies
- Salary: AU$395,738 (from 1 July 2022)

The deputy premier of Victoria is the second-most senior officer in the Government of Victoria, Australia. The deputy premier position was created in May 1932, with Robert Menzies being the first person to hold the position. The deputy premier is appointed by the Governor on the advice of the premier. The deputy premier is usually also a minister in the government.

When the Labor Party forms government, the deputy leader of the Labor parliamentary party typically becomes the deputy premier. The same was the case when the Liberal Party formed government on its own. When the Liberal-National coalition is in government, the deputy premier is usually the leader of the junior coalition partner, the Nationals (or its predecessor, the Country Party). The current deputy premier is Gabrielle Williams of the Labor Party, who has held the position since 28 July 2026.

== Duties ==
The duties of the deputy premier are to act on behalf of the premier in his or her absence overseas or on leave. The deputy premier has always been a member of the Cabinet, and has always held at least one substantive portfolio (It would be technically possible for a minister to hold only the portfolio of Deputy Premier, but this has never happened).

If the premier were to die, become incapacitated or resign, the Governor would normally appoint the deputy premier as acting Premier. If the governing or majority party had not yet elected a new leader, that appointment would be on an interim basis. Should a different leader emerge, that person would then be appointed Premier.

== List of deputy premiers of Victoria ==
No.	Portrait	Name Electoral district (Birth–death)	Term of office		Party	Premier
No.	Portrait	Name Electoral district (Birth–death)	Term start	Term end	Party	Premier
1		Robert Menzies; MP for Nunawading (1894–1978)	19 May 1932	31 July 1934	United Australia	Sir Stanley Argyle; United Australia (1932–1935)
2		Ian Macfarlan; MP for Brighton (1881–1964)	31 July 1934	12 March 1935	United Australia	Sir Stanley Argyle; United Australia (1932–1935)
3		Albert Dunstan; MP for Korong and Eaglehawk (1882–1950)	12 March 1935	20 March 1935	Country	Sir Stanley Argyle; United Australia (1932–1935)
4		Wilfrid Kent Hughes; MP for Kew (1895–1970)	20 March 1935	2 April 1935	United Australia	Sir Stanley Argyle; United Australia (1932–1935)
5		Murray Bourchier; MP for Goulbourn Valley (1881–1937)	2 April 1935	24 June 1936	United Country	Albert Dunstan; United Country (1935–1943)
6		Francis Old; MP for Swan Hill (1875–1950)	30 June 1936	14 October 1937	United Country	Albert Dunstan; United Country (1935–1943)
7		Albert Lind; MP for Gippsland East (1878–1964)	14 October 1937	14 September 1943	United Country	Albert Dunstan; United Country (1935–1943)
8		Bert Cremean; MP for Clifton Hill (1900–1945)	14 September 1943	18 September 1943	Labor	John Cain (Sr.); Labor (1943)
9		Thomas Hollway; MP for Ballarat (1906–1971)	18 September 1943	2 October 1945	United Australia (until 1945)	Albert Dunstan; United Country (1943–1945)
9		Thomas Hollway; MP for Ballarat (1906–1971)	18 September 1943	2 October 1945	Liberal (from 1945)	Albert Dunstan; United Country (1943–1945)
10		Thomas Maltby; MP for Ballarat (1890–1976)	2 October 1945	21 November 1945	Liberal	Ian Macfarlan; Liberal (1945)
11		Frank Field; MP for Dandenong (1904–1985)	21 November 1945	20 November 1947	Labor	John Cain (Sr.); Labor (1945–1947)
12		John McDonald; MP for Shepparton (1896–1977)	20 November 1947	3 December 1948	Country	Thomas Hollway; Liberal (until 1949); Liberal and Country (from 1949) (1947–1950)
(4)		Wilfrid Kent Hughes; MP for Kew (1895–1970)	3 December 1948	28 October 1949	Liberal (until 1949)	Thomas Hollway; Liberal (until 1949); Liberal and Country (from 1949) (1947–1950)
(4)		Wilfrid Kent Hughes; MP for Kew (1895–1970)	3 December 1948	28 October 1949	Liberal and Country (from 1949)	Thomas Hollway; Liberal (until 1949); Liberal and Country (from 1949) (1947–1950)
13		Trevor Oldham; MP for Malvern (1900–1953)	8 November 1949	27 June 1950	Liberal and Country	Thomas Hollway; Liberal (until 1949); Liberal and Country (from 1949) (1947–1950)
14		Keith Dodgshun; MP for Rainbow (1893–1971)	27 June 1950	28 October 1952	Country	John McDonald; Country (1950–1952)
15		Alexander Dennett; MP for Caulfield (1894–1956)	28 October 1952	31 October 1952	Electoral Reform	Thomas Hollway; Electoral Reform (1952)
(14)		Keith Dodgshun; MP for Rainbow (1893–1971)	31 October 1952	17 December 1952	Country	John McDonald; Country (1952)
16		Bill Galvin; MP for Bendigo (1903–1966)	17 December 1952	7 June 1955	Labor	John Cain (Sr.); Labor (1952–1955)
17		Sir Arthur Rylah; MP for Kew (1909–1974)	7 June 1955	5 March 1971	Liberal and Country (until 1965)	Sir Henry Bolte; Liberal and Country (until 1965); Liberal (from 1965) (1955–1972)
17		Sir Arthur Rylah; MP for Kew (1909–1974)	7 June 1955	5 March 1971	Liberal (from 1965)	Sir Henry Bolte; Liberal and Country (until 1965); Liberal (from 1965) (1955–1972)
18		Rupert Hamer; MP for Kew (1916–2004)	21 April 1971	23 August 1972	Liberal	Sir Henry Bolte; Liberal and Country (until 1965); Liberal (from 1965) (1955–1972)
19		Lindsay Thompson; MP for Malvern (1923–2008)	23 August 1972	5 June 1981	Liberal	Rupert Hamer; Liberal (1972–1981)
20		Bill Borthwick; MP for Monbulk (1924–2001)	5 June 1981	8 April 1982	Liberal	Lindsay Thompson; Liberal (1981–1982)
21		Robert Fordham; MP for Footscray (born 1942)	8 April 1982	31 January 1989	Labor	John Cain (Jr.); Labor (1982–1990)
22		Joan Kirner; MP for Williamstown (1938–2015)	7 February 1989	10 August 1990	Labor	John Cain (Jr.); Labor (1982–1990)
23		Jim Kennan; MP for Broadmeadows (1946–2010)	10 August 1990	6 October 1992	Labor	Joan Kirner; Labor (1990–1992)
24		Pat McNamara; MP for Benalla (born 1949)	6 October 1992	21 October 1999	National	Jeff Kennett; Liberal (1992–1999)
25		John Thwaites; MP for Albert Park (born 1955)	21 October 1999	30 July 2007	Labor	Steve Bracks; Labor (1999–2007)
26		Rob Hulls; MP for Niddrie (born 1957)	30 July 2007	2 December 2010	Labor	John Brumby; Labor (2007–2010)
27		Peter Ryan; MP for Gippsland South (born 1950)	2 December 2010	4 December 2014	National	Ted Baillieu; Liberal (2010–2013)
27		Peter Ryan; MP for Gippsland South (born 1950)	2 December 2010	4 December 2014	National	Denis Napthine; Liberal (2013–2014)
28		James Merlino; MP for Monbulk (born 1972)	4 December 2014	27 June 2022	Labor	Daniel Andrews; Labor (2014–2023)
29		Jacinta Allan; MP for Bendigo East (born 1973)	27 June 2022	27 September 2023	Labor	Daniel Andrews; Labor (2014–2023)
30		Ben Carroll; MP for Niddrie (born 1975)	2 October 2023	28 July 2026	Labor	Jacinta Allan; Labor (2023–2026)
31		Gabrielle Williams; MP for Dandenong (born 1982)	28 July 2026	Incumbent	Labor	Ben Carroll; Labor (since 2026)

== Notable careers ==
Among the most notable former deputy premiers of Victoria have been Robert Menzies (1932–1934) who went on to become the longest serving prime minister of Australia. One of Menzies' federal ministers was Wilfrid Kent Hughes who like Menzies had served as deputy premier of Victoria prior to switching to federal politics. Others include Albert Dunstan (1935) who subsequently became Premier for a then record of ten years, Rupert Hamer (1971–1972) who later became a long serving premier, Thomas Hollway (1943–1945) who was Premier on three occasions and Joan Kirner became the first female deputy premier in 1989 before becoming the first female premier in 1990.

== See also ==
- Premier of Victoria
- Government of Victoria
