= John Bloomfield (politician) =

Australian politician

Sir John Bloomfield

Member of the Victorian Legislative Assembly for Malvern
- In office 11 July 1953 – 18 May 1970
- Preceded by: Trevor Oldham
- Succeeded by: Lindsay Thompson

Personal details
- Born: 9 October 1901 Toorak, Victoria
- Died: 30 June 1989 (aged 87)
- Party: Liberal and Country Party (until 1965); Liberal Party (from 1965)
- Education: University of Melbourne
- Awards: Knight Bachelor

Military service
- Allegiance: Australia
- Branch/service: Citizen Military Forces; Second Australian Imperial Force
- Years of service: 1934–1945
- Rank: Lieutenant Colonel
- Commands: 2/4th Light Anti-Aircraft Regiment (1944–45)
- Battles/wars: Second World War

Sir John Stoughton Bloomfield QC (9 October 1901 – 30 June 1989) was an Australian politician.

Bloomfield was born in Toorak to accountant Arthur stoughton Bloomfield and Ada Victoria McGuigan. He attended Geelong Grammar School before entering Trinity College in 1921 while studying at Melbourne University, where he received a Bachelor of Law. He practised as a solicitor from 1927, and on 21 March 1931 married Beatrice Madge Taylor, with whom he had two children. During World War II he served in the AIF in the Middle East and New Guinea, rising to the rank of lieutenant-colonel. On his return from the war he was a barrister 1945–1955.

A member of the Liberal and Country Party, Bloomfield was elected to the Victorian Legislative Assembly in 1953 in a by-election for the seat of Malvern. In 1955 he joined the frontbench as Minister of Labour and Industry and of Electrical Undertakings, but he soon moved to the Education portfolio in February 1956, where he remained for eleven years. He took silk in 1965 and was knighted on his retirement from the frontbench in 1967. Bloomfield retired in 1970 and died in 1989.

Victorian Legislative Assembly
Preceded by Trevor Oldham	Member for Malvern; 1953–1970	Succeeded by Lindsay Thompson
