= Minister for Agriculture (Victoria) =

Australian state cabinet office

Minister for Agriculture of Victoria
- Victorian coat of arms

- Flag of Victoria
- Incumbent; Ros Spence MP since 2 October 2023
- Department of Energy, Environment and Climate Action
- Style: The Honourable
- Member of: Parliament; Executive council
- Reports to: Premier
- Nominator: Premier
- Appointer: Governor on the recommendation of the Premier
- Term length: At the governor's pleasure
- Precursor: Minister of Agriculture; Minister of Water Supply and Agriculture; Minister for Agriculture and Rural Affairs; Minister for Food and Agriculture; Minister for Agriculture and Resources; Minister for Agriculture and Food Security
- Inaugural holder: James Casey
- Formation: 19 June 1872
- Website: Department Website

The Minister for Agriculture is a minister within the Executive Council of Victoria tasked with the responsibility of overseeing the Victorian Government's agriculture initiatives. The minister is supported by the Department of Energy, Environment and Climate Action's Agriculture Victoria.

The current minister is Ros Spence since October 2023.

== Ministers ==
Order	Minister	Party affiliation	Ministerial title	Term start	Term end	Time in office	Notes
1	James Casey MP	Independent	Minister of Agriculture	19 June 1872	7 August 1875	3 years, 49 days	
2	Francis Longmore MP	Non-Party Liberalism	Minister of Agriculture	23 August 1875	20 October 1875	58 days	
3	Duncan Gillies MP	Non-Party Conservatism	Minister of Agriculture	25 October 1875	21 May 1877	1 year, 208 days	
(2)	Francis Longmore MP	Non-Party Liberalism	Minister of Agriculture	28 May 1877	5 March 1880	2 years, 282 days	
4	John Duffy MP	Non-Party Liberalism	Minister of Agriculture	19 March 1880	3 August 1880	137 days	
5	Richard Richardson MP	Non-Party Liberalism	Minister of Agriculture	12 August 1880	9 July 1881	331 days	
6	Charles Young MP	Non-Party Liberalism	Minister of Water Supply and Agriculture	9 July 1881	8 March 1883	1 year, 242 days	
7	Jonas Levien MP	Non-Party Liberalism	Non-Party Conservatism	Minister of Agriculture	8 March 1883	18 February 1886	2 years, 347 days
8	John Dow MP	18 February 1886	Non-Party Conservatism	Minister of Agriculture	5 November 1890	4 years, 260 days	
9	Allan McLean MP	Non-Party Liberalism	5 November 1890	Minister of Agriculture	22 April 1891	168 days	
10	George Graham MP	Non-Party Liberalism	22 April 1891	Minister of Agriculture	23 January 1893	1 year, 276 days	
11	William Webb MP	Non-Party Conservatism	23 January 1893	Minister of Agriculture	27 September 1894	1 year, 247 days	
12	John Taverner MP	Non-Party Liberalism	27 September 1894	Minister of Agriculture	5 December 1899	5 years, 69 days	
(10)	George Graham MP	Non-Party Liberalism	5 December 1899	Minister of Agriculture	19 November 1900	349 days	
13	John Morrissey MP	Non-Party Liberalism	19 November 1900	Minister of Agriculture	10 June 1902	1 year, 203 days	
(12)	John Taverner MP	National Citizens' Reform League	10 June 1902	Minister of Agriculture	19 February 1904	1 year, 254 days	
14	John Murray MP	National Citizens' Reform League	19 February 1904	Minister of Agriculture	8 November 1904	263 days	
15	George Swinburne MP	National Citizens' Reform League	8 November 1904	Minister of Agriculture	31 October 1908	3 years, 358 days	
16	Alfred Downward MP	National Citizens' Reform League	31 October 1908	Minister of Agriculture	8 January 1909	69 days	
(10)	George Graham MP	Commonwealth Liberal	8 January 1909	Minister of Agriculture	9 December 1913	4 years, 335 days	
17	William Plain MP	Labor	9 December 1913	Minister of Agriculture	22 December 1913	13 days	
18	William Hutchinson MP	Commonwealth Liberal	22 December 1913	Minister of Agriculture	9 November 1915	1 year, 322 days	
19	Fredrick Hagelthorn MLC	Commonwealth Liberal	9 November 1915	Minister of Agriculture	29 November 1917	2 years, 20 days	
19	Fredrick Hagelthorn MLC	Nationalist	9 November 1915	Minister of Agriculture	29 November 1917	2 years, 20 days	
20	David Oman MP	Nationalist	29 November 1917	Minister of Agriculture	4 November 1920	2 years, 341 days	
21	Harry Lawson MP	Nationalist	4 November 1920	Minister of Agriculture	7 September 1923	2 years, 307 days	
22	Francis Old MP	Country	7 September 1923	Minister of Agriculture	19 March 1924	194 days	
23	John Gordon MP	Nationalist	19 March 1924	Minister of Agriculture	18 July 1924	121 days	
24	Edmond Hogan MP	Labor	18 July 1924	Minister of Agriculture	18 November 1924	123 days	
25	Murray Bourchier MP	Country	18 November 1924	Minister of Agriculture	20 May 1927	2 years, 183 days	
26	Bill Slater MP	Labor	20 May 1927	Minister of Agriculture	22 November 1928	1 year, 186 days	
27	John Pennington MP	Nationalist	22 November 1928	Minister of Agriculture	12 December 1929	1 year, 20 days	
(26)	Bill Slater MP	Labor	12 December 1929	Minister of Agriculture	19 May 1932	2 years, 159 days	
28	John Allan MP	Country	19 May 1932	Minister of Agriculture	20 March 1935	2 years, 305 days	
29	Clive Shields MP	United Australia	20 March 1935	Minister of Agriculture	2 April 1935	13 days	
(25)	Edmond Hogan MP	Country	2 April 1935	Minister of Agriculture	28 June 1943	8 years, 87 days	
30	Norman Martin MP	Country	28 June 1943	Minister of Agriculture	14 September 1943	78 days	
31	William McKenzie MP	Labor	14 September 1943	Minister of Agriculture	18 September 1943	4 days	
(30)	Norman Martin MP	Country	18 September 1943	Minister of Agriculture	2 October 1945	2 years, 14 days	
32	William Cumming MP	Liberal	2 October 1945	Minister of Agriculture	21 November 1945	50 days	
(31)	William McKenzie MP	Labor	21 November 1945	Minister of Agriculture	20 November 1947	1 year, 364 days	
33	Alexander Dennett MP	Liberal	20 November 1947	Minister of Agriculture	27 June 1950	2 years, 219 days	
34	George Moss MP	Country	27 June 1950	Minister of Agriculture	28 October 1952	2 years, 123 days	
35	Hugh MacLeod MLC	Electoral Reform	28 October 1952	Minister of Agriculture	31 October 1952	3 days	
(34)	George Moss MP	Country	31 October 1952	Minister of Agriculture	17 December 1952	47 days	
36	Clive Stoneham MP	Labor	17 December 1952	Minister of Agriculture	7 June 1955	2 years, 172 days	
37	Gilbert Chandler MLC	Liberal	7 June 1955	Minister of Agriculture	30 May 1973	17 years, 357 days	
38	Ian Smith MP	Liberal	30 May 1973	Minister of Agriculture	23 December 1980	7 years, 207 days	
39	Tom Austin MP	Liberal	23 December 1980	Minister of Agriculture	8 April 1982	2 years, 0 days	
40	Eric Kent MLC	Labor	8 April 1982	Minister of Agriculture	2 May 1985	3 years, 24 days	
41	Evan Walker MLC	Labor	Minister for Agriculture and Rural Affairs	2 May 1985	13 October 1988	3 years, 164 days	
42	Robert Fordham MP	Labor	Minister for Agriculture and Rural Affairs	13 October 1988	31 January 1989	110 days	
43	Barry Rowe MP	Labor	Minister for Agriculture and Rural Affairs	7 February 1989	18 January 1991	1 year, 345 days	
44	Ian Baker MP	Labor	Minister for Agriculture	18 January 1991	28 January 1992	1 year, 10 days	
44	Ian Baker MP	Labor	Minister for Food and Agriculture	28 January 1992	6 October 1992	252 days	
45	Pat McNamara MP	Nationals	Minister for Agriculture	6 October 1992	9 November 1992	34 days	
46	Bill McGrath MP	Nationals	Minister for Agriculture	9 November 1992	3 April 1996	3 years, 146 days	
(45)	Pat McNamara MP	Nationals	Minister for Agriculture and Resources	3 April 1996	20 October 1999	3 years, 200 days	
47	Keith Hamilton MP	Labor	Minister for Agriculture	20 October 1999	5 December 2002	3 years, 46 days	
48	Bob Cameron MP	Labor	Minister for Agriculture	5 December 2002	1 December 2006	3 years, 361 days	
49	Joe Helper MP	Labor	Minister for Agriculture	1 December 2006	2 December 2010	4 years, 1 day	
50	Peter Walsh MP	Nationals	Minister for Agriculture and Food Security	2 December 2010	4 December 2014	4 years, 2 days	
51	Jaala Pulford MLC	Labor	Minister for Agriculture	4 December 2014	19 December 2018	4 years, 15 days	
52	Jaclyn Symes MLC	Labor	Minister for Agriculture	29 November 2018	22 December 2020	2 years, 23 days	
53	Mary-Anne Thomas MP	Labor	Minister for Agriculture	22 December 2020	27 June 2022	1 year, 187 days	
54	Gayle Tierney MLC	Labor	Minister for Agriculture	27 June 2022	2 October 2023	1 year, 97 days	
55	Ros Spence MP	Labor	Minister for Agriculture	2 October 2023	Incumbent	2 years, 340 days	
