= Tom Austin (politician) =

Australian politician

Thomas Leslie Austin (24 September 1923 – 1 June 2002) was an Australian politician.

He was born in Melbourne to Leslie Albert Austin, a farmer, and Nora Bradfute Cunningham. After attending Geelong Grammar School, he served in the Royal Australian Navy from 1941 to 1945 as a sub-lieutenant. On his return he was a woolclasser from 1946 to 1947, when he became a sharefarmer. He settled in Darlington in 1950. In 1972 he was elected to the Victorian Legislative Assembly as the Liberal member for Hampden, shifting to Ripon in 1976. He was appointed Minister for Public Works and Minister for Property and Services in 1978, moving to the Agriculture portfolio in 1980. Following the defeat of the Coalition in 1982 he was Opposition Spokesman for Agriculture, becoming Shadow Minister for Sport, Recreation and Racing in 1990; he was also Deputy Leader of the Opposition from 1985 to 1987. He resigned his seat in 1992 and became Chairman of the Victorian Dairy Industry Authority, a position he held until 2000. Austin died in Melbourne in 2002.

Victorian Legislative Assembly
| Preceded by Sir Henry Bolte | Member for Hampden; 1972–1976 | Abolished |
| New seat | Member for Ripon; 1976–1992 | Succeeded by Steve Elder |
