= Lindsay Thompson =

Australian politician (1923–2008)

The Honourable Lindsay Thompson AO, CMG
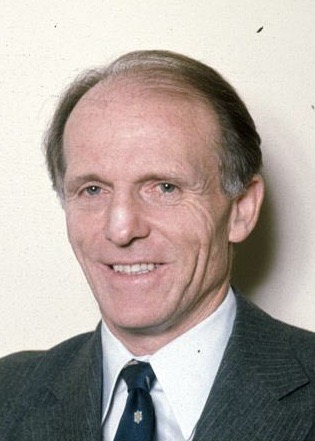
- Thompson in 1975

40th Premier of Victoria
- In office 5 June 1981 – 8 April 1982
- Monarch: Elizabeth II
- Deputy: Bill Borthwick
- Preceded by: Rupert Hamer
- Succeeded by: John Cain Jr.

19th Deputy Premier of Victoria
- In office 23 August 1972 – 5 June 1981
- Premier: Rupert Hamer
- Preceded by: Rupert Hamer
- Succeeded by: Bill Borthwick

Member of Parliament for Malvern
- In office 30 May 1970 – 4 December 1982
- Preceded by: John Bloomfield
- Succeeded by: Geoff Leigh

Personal details
- Born: Lindsay Hamilton Simpson Thompson; 15 October 1923 Warburton, Victoria, Australia
- Died: 16 July 2008 (aged 84) Malvern, Victoria, Australia
- Party: Liberal Party
- Spouse: Joan Margaret Poynder
- Children: Murray Thompson
- Education: University of Melbourne
- Cabinet: Thompson Ministry
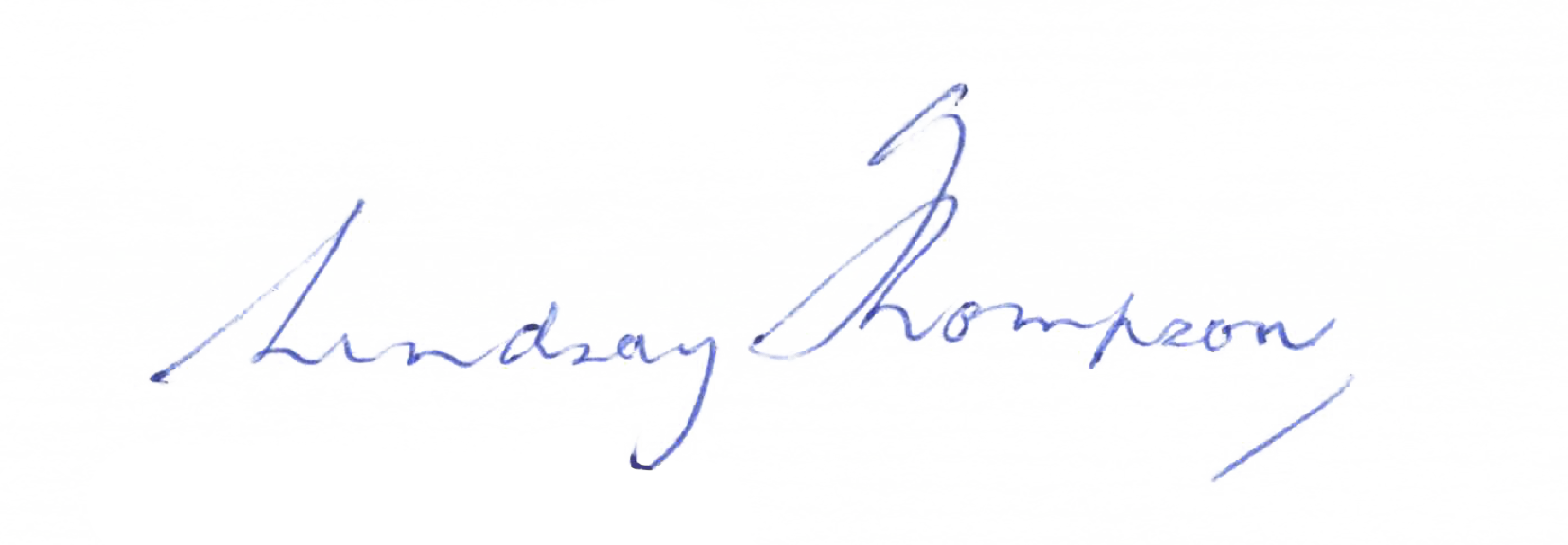
- Signature

Military service
- Allegiance: Australia
- Branch/service: Australian Army
- Years of service: 1942–1945
- Rank: Signalman

Lindsay Hamilton Simpson Thompson (15 October 1923 – 16 July 2008) was an Australian politician and army officer who served as the 40th premier of Victoria and leader of the Victorian Liberal Party from 1981 to 1982. He had previously served as the 19th deputy premier of Victoria from 1972 to 1981 and was the member of the Legislative Council for the district of Malvern from 1970 to 1982.

Thompson was the longest-serving member in Victorian parliamentary history, serving a total of 27 years in the Legislative Council from 1955 to 1970 and the Legislative Assembly from 1970 to 1982. He had held the housing, education, police and treasury portfolios throughout his parliamentary career, and was notable for his actions in the Faraday School kidnapping as education minister.

== Early life ==
The son of Arthur K. Thompson and Ethel May Simpson (1883-1958), one of the four Simpson sisters who founded the Mentone (Girls') High School, later known as Mentone Girls' Grammar School, Lindsay Hamilton Simpson Thompson was born in Warburton, a town north-east of Melbourne on 15 October 1923. His parents were both schoolteachers. His father died when he was two and so he was raised by his mother in difficult circumstances.

He won a scholarship to Caulfield Grammar School and eventually graduated as both school captain and the school dux. The school's new gymnasium was opened as the Lindsay Thompson Centre in 1997.

After service as a signalman in the Australian Army during World War II, he graduated from the University of Melbourne with degrees in arts (honours) and education; while at university, he was a member of the Melbourne University Liberal Club. He became a school teacher, teaching at Malvern Central Primary School and later at Melbourne High School.

== Political career ==
In 1955, he was elected to the Victorian Legislative Council in the Monash and Higginbotham Provinces as a Liberal, where he served until 1970, when he transferred to the Legislative Assembly as MP for Malvern.

In 1958, Thompson was appointed Assistant Chief Secretary in the government of Henry Bolte. He would serve as a minister without interruption until 1982, making him the longest-serving minister in Victoria's history. Of all the federal and state ministers in Australian history, only the South Australian Sir Thomas Playford IV, who served in cabinet without interruption from 1938 to 1965, and Queensland's Joh Bjelke-Petersen, in cabinet without interruption from 1963 to 1987, held ministerial office continuously for longer than Thompson.

Thompson then served as Minister for Housing from 1961 to 1967, when many of Melbourne's controversial public housing towers were built. In 1967, he was appointed Minister for Education and held the post until 1979, a record time. He presided over the major expansion of state education in Victoria.

=== Faraday hero ===
In 1972, a teacher and six school children were kidnapped at a school in the country town of Faraday by a man demanding a $1 million ransom. Thompson, as education minister, went to the prearranged site in Woodend and was ready to deliver the ransom personally, but the teacher and children had escaped from the van in which they were locked before that was necessary.

Thompson received a bravery award for his actions during the kidnapping.

=== Premier of Victoria ===
During the premiership of Rupert Hamer, Thompson was named Deputy Premier. At various times, he served as Chief Secretary, then Treasurer and Minister for Police and Emergency Services. On 5 June 1981, Hamer resigned under pressure from the conservative faction of his own party, and Thompson won a Liberal Party ballot to succeed him as Premier. The Liberals had been in power for 27 years and the new Labor leader, John Cain, was mounting a strong challenge to a government that was increasingly seen as tired and complacent. A year earlier, at the 1980 federal election, the Liberals had lost seven seats in Victoria, over half of a nationwide 12-seat swing that nearly won government for federal Labor.

Knowing that he faced a statutory general election within less than a year, Thompson waited as long as he could, finally calling an election for April 1982. At that election, the Liberals were heavily defeated, suffering a 17-seat swing, the worst that a sitting non-Labor government has ever suffered in Victoria.

Thompson resigned as Liberal leader and from Parliament on 5 November.

Thompson supported keeping the monarchy of Australia.

== Awards ==
Thompson was made a Companion of the Order of St Michael and St George on 14 June 1975 for serving as a minister. He was made an Officer of the Order of Australia on Australia Day in 1990 "for service to government and politics and to the Victorian Parliament" and also received a Centenary Medal in 2001.

Thompson received a Bronze Medal for Bravery from the Royal Humane Society for his actions in the Farraday kidnappings.

Throughout life, Thompson was an ardent fan of the Richmond Football Club, and he frequently travelled to Melbourne Cricket Ground to watch his beloved Tigers play.

He was a Number One ticket holder of the club and was awarded life membership in 1993. Thompson had a long association with the Melbourne Cricket Ground and was a member of the MCG trust for 32 years from 1967 to 1999, taking on the role of chairman between 1987 and 1998. Thompson laid the first stone to mark the construction of the Great Southern Stand at the ground.

== Personal life ==
Thompson married Joan Margaret Poynder (1925-2023) on 18 January 1950. They had three children: Murray, David, and Heather. Their son Murray was a member of the Victorian Legislative Assembly from 1992 until 2018.

== Legacy ==
At the funeral, among other kind words, former Prime Minister John Howard said, "I can honestly say I never heard anyone say a nasty thing about Lindsay Thompson, and I can tell you that has to be a first in Australian politics."

== See also ==
- Faraday School kidnapping
- List of Caulfield Grammar School people

Victorian Legislative Council
Preceded by Sir Arthur Warner	Member for Higinbotham Province; 1955–1967	Succeeded by Baron Snider
Preceded by Thomas William Brennan	Member for Monash Province; 1967–1970	Succeeded by Charles Gawith
Victorian Legislative Assembly
Preceded by Sir John Bloomfield	Member for Malvern; 1970–1982	Succeeded by Geoff Leigh
Political offices
Preceded by Rupert Hamer	Premier of Victoria; 1981–1982	Succeeded by John Cain
Preceded by John Cain	Leader of the Opposition (Victoria); 1982	Succeeded by Jeff Kennett
Party political offices
Preceded by Rupert Hamer	Leader of the Liberal Party in Victoria; 1981–1982	Succeeded by Jeff Kennett
