= Rupert Hamer =

Australian politician (1916–2004)

The Honourable Sir Rupert Hamer AC, KCMG, ED
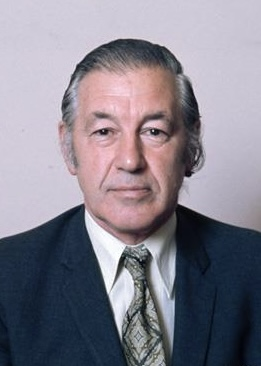
- Hamer in 1974

39th Premier of Victoria
- In office 23 August 1972 – 5 June 1981
- Monarch: Elizabeth II
- Governor: Sir Rohan Delacombe; Sir Henry Winneke
- Deputy: Lindsay Thompson
- Preceded by: Sir Henry Bolte
- Succeeded by: Lindsay Thompson

18th Deputy Premier of Victoria
- In office 21 April 1971 – 23 August 1972
- Premier: Henry Bolte
- Preceded by: Arthur Rylah
- Succeeded by: Lindsay Thompson

Member of the Victorian Parliament for Kew
- In office 17 April 1971 – 17 July 1981
- Preceded by: Arthur Rylah
- Succeeded by: Prue Sibree

Member of the Victorian Legislative Council
- In office 21 June 1958 – 17 March 1971
- Preceded by: Clifden Eager
- Succeeded by: Haddon Storey
- Constituency: East Yarra Province

Personal details
- Born: Rupert James Hamer; 29 July 1916 Kew, Melbourne, Victoria, Australia
- Died: 23 March 2004 (aged 87) Kew, Melbourne, Victoria, Australia
- Party: Liberal Party
- Spouse: April Felicity Mackintosh (m. 1944)

Sir Rupert James "Dick" Hamer, AC, KCMG, ED (29 July 1916 – 23 March 2004) was an Australian politician who served as the 39th premier of Victoria and leader of the Victorian Liberal Party from 1972 to 1981. He had previously served as the 18th deputy premier of Victoria from 1971 to 1972 and was the member of the Legislative Assembly for the district of Kew from 1971 to 1981.

== Early years ==
Hamer was born in Melbourne to Elizabeth Anne McLuckie and Hubert Hamer, a solicitor. His three siblings all achieved success in their fields: his sister was Alison Patrick (1921–2009), an internationally known historian of the French Revolution; his brothers were David Hamer (1923–2002), a federal Liberal politician, and Alan, a Rhodes Scholar, chemist and managing director of ICI Australia.

Hamer was educated at Melbourne Grammar School and Geelong Grammar School and graduated in law from the University of Melbourne, where he was resident at Trinity College from 1936. He was a member, with his brother Alan, of the College First XVIII Australian Rules football team, and was Secretary of the Student Club. He joined the Melbourne University Regiment of the Australian Army in 1935 and served with them until 1939. He was commissioned as an officer in August 1940 in 2nd/43rd Battalion AIF and served at Tobruk, Syria, El Alamein, New Guinea and in Normandy. He was Mentioned in Dispatches in 1945 for "distinguished service in the South-West Pacific". After the war he became a partner in his family's law firm and was active in the Liberal Party. In 1944 he married April Mackintosh, with whom he had five children. He continued his military service and remained active in the Citizens Military Force joining the Victorian Scottish Regiment in 1948, of which he was Commanding Officer from 1954 to 1958.

== Parliamentary career ==
Hamer was elected to the Victorian Legislative Council for East Yarra Province in 1958. He was appointed to the cabinet of the Premier, Henry Bolte, in 1962, becoming Assistant Chief Secretary. He was Minister for Local Government from 1964 to 1971.

After Deputy Premier Arthur Rylah's retirement, Hamer was elected in a by-election for Rylah's Legislative Assembly seat of Kew in eastern Melbourne. He immediately assumed Rylah's portfolios of Deputy Premier and Chief Secretary. Although he was loyal to Bolte, he had a reputation for being much more liberal than his rough-edged conservative leader.

== Premier of Victoria ==
By the 1970s, the Liberal government was losing its appeal to younger, urban voters in Melbourne. Realizing that the Liberals had a year at most to retool their image before a statutory general election, Bolte retired in 1972 and endorsed Hamer as his successor. Despite opposition from the conservative wing of the party, Bolte's support was enough for Hamer to prevail in the ensuing leadership ballot, and he was sworn in as premier on 23 August.

Hamer represented such a sharp change from the Bolte era that he was able to campaign in the 1973 election as a new, reformist leader, despite the fact that the Liberals had been in power for 18 years. Employing the slogan "Hamer Makes It Happen", he won a landslide against the Labor opposition under Clyde Holding, increasing his party's already large majority. He won an even larger victory in 1976, defeating Holding yet again.

Hamer, assisted by key allies such as Planning Minister Alan Hunt, Conservation Minister Bill Borthwick, Attorney-General Haddon Storey, Social Welfare Minister Vasey Houghton, Housing and Youth Sport and Recreation Minister Brian Dixon and Community Welfare Services Minister Walter Jona moved to modernise and liberalise government in Victoria. Environmental protection laws were greatly strengthened, the death penalty was abolished, Aboriginal communities were given ownership of their lands, abortion and homosexuality were decriminalised and anti-discrimination laws were introduced.

Hamer began the modernisation of Melbourne's moribund tramway system (now the world's biggest by route length), ordering 100 new trams immediately with further orders following, and approving the extension of the Burwood tram line from Warrigal Road to Middleborough Road. These were the first new trams and first new tram line since 1956, when Bolte stopped further expansion of the system and cancelled an order for 30 extra W7 class trams.

Restrictions on shop trading hours, and on public entertainment on Sundays, were eased. A major new centre for the performing arts, the Arts Centre Melbourne, was built in the centre of the city. These measures won the support of middle-class voters, and the Melbourne daily The Age, which had been critical of Bolte during his later years in power, strongly supported Hamer's government.

Hamer was instrumental in the introduction of the Historic Buildings Act 1974 and made significant moves in 1977 which guaranteed the protection of several significant buildings including the Windsor Hotel and Regent Theatre in Melbourne and Shamrock Hotel in Bendigo.

By 1979, however, the gloss was wearing off the Hamer image, as Victoria was beset by increasing economic difficulties, rising unemployment, industrial unrest and a decline in Victoria's traditional manufacturing industrial base. At the same time, the Labor Party was mounting a stronger challenge to the Liberals than it had in some time. Frank Wilkes had taken over as ALP leader from Holding in 1977, and took Labor into the 1979 election with a realistic chance of winning government for the first time since 1955. Ultimately, the Liberals suffered an 11-seat swing, losing many seats in eastern Melbourne. Their majority was reduced to only one seat, although they could also count on the support of the rural-based National Country Party.

In spite of the setback, Hamer continued in office. He promoted some new younger ministers such as Lou Lieberman (Planning), Norman Lacy (Educational Services and The Arts) and Jeff Kennett (Housing) who continued to pursue a reformist liberal agenda particularly in human services, education, environment protection, planning and the arts. It reformed the administration of the highly centralised Department of Education in Victoria into a regionalised organisation with devolution of greater control to local schools. It established a Special Assistance Program to address illiteracy and innumeracy in primary schools. It introduced a Health and Human Relations Education curriculum and compulsory Physical Education in government schools. Also, it completed the construction of the Victorian Arts Centre, established the Australian Children's Television Foundation, established the Meat Market Craft Centre, acquired and established the Heide Museum of Modern Art, created Film Victoria and reconstituted the Victorian College of the Arts. These changes were not enough to prevent Labor from taking seven seats off the Coalition in Victoria at the 1980 federal election, over half of its nationwide 12-seat swing.

During this period the conservative wing of the Liberal Party, which had always disliked Hamer's social liberalism, began to undermine his position. The leading conservative, Economic Development Minister Ian Smith, was sacked from Cabinet for disloyalty in March 1981. He was reinstated after pledging loyalty to Hamer, but resigned again in May. It was apparent by this stage that Hamer had lost the support of his party. He resigned in June, and was succeeded by Deputy Premier Lindsay Thompson. The following month he resigned from Parliament, and was knighted, becoming Sir Rupert Hamer. At the ensuing by-election, Prue Sibree retained his seat for the Liberals. At the election the following year the Liberals were defeated after 27 years in power.

Hamer is the last non-elected Victorian Premier to have subsequently been elected in his own right.

== Later career ==
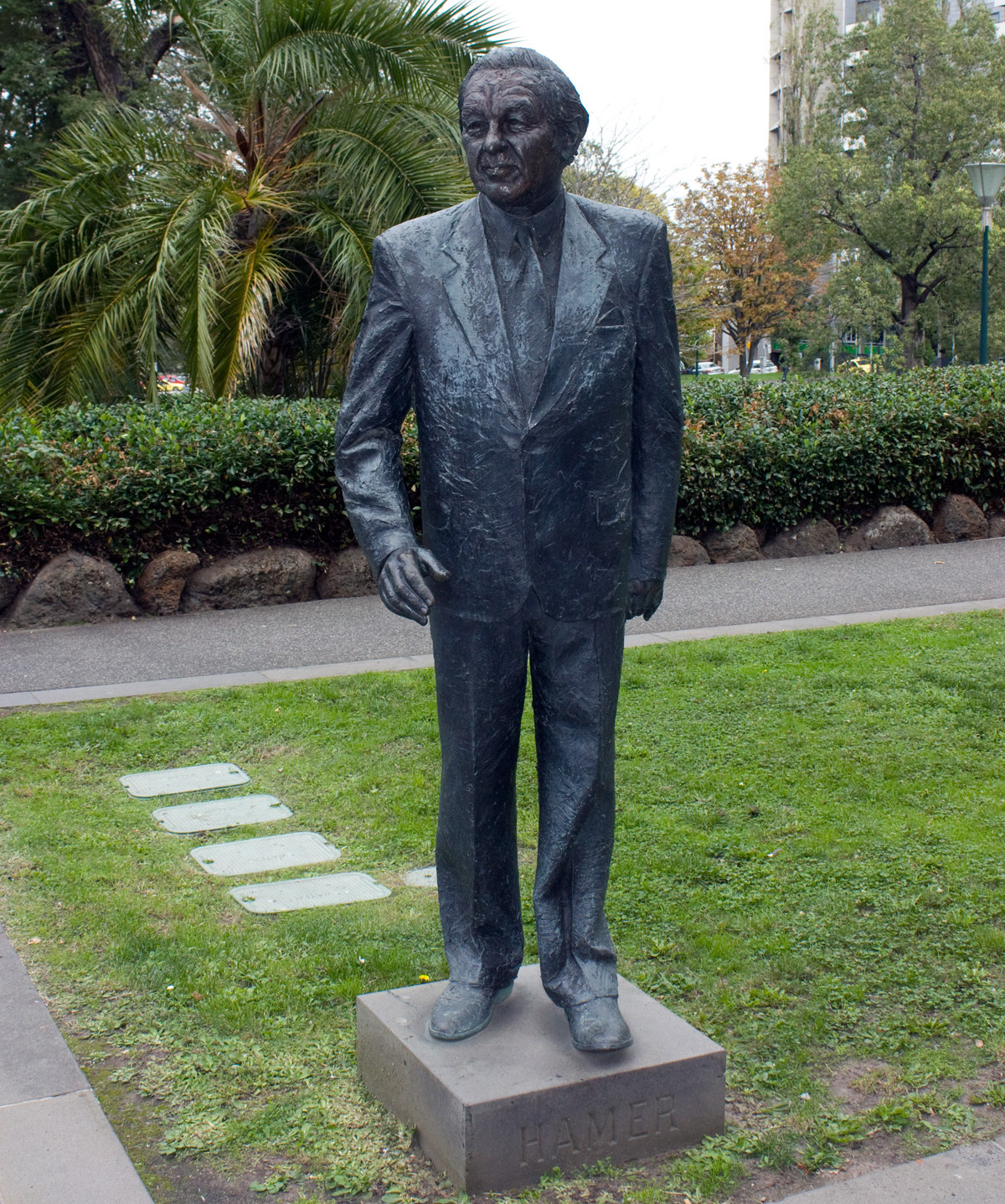
Rupert Hamer's Statue at 1 Treasury Place

Hamer remained active in public and community affairs after his retirement. He was chairman of the Victorian State Opera from 1982 to 1995, president of the Victorian College of the Arts from 1982 to 1996 and a patron of the Public Transport Users Association from 1989. He died of heart failure in his sleep on 23 March 2004, and his family accepted the offer of a state funeral from the Labor Premier, Steve Bracks. Hamer was praised by Victorians of all political views. The former Labor federal president, Barry Jones (and was a member of the Victorian Legislative Assembly between 1972 and 1977 serving alongside then Premier Hamer), called him "the finest flower in the Victorian Deakinite tradition.".

Despite being a knight, Hamer was a staunch republican and a member of the Australian Republican Movement's advisory committee.

=== Hamer Hall ===
Shortly after his death in 2004, the main concert hall of the Melbourne Arts Centre, of which Hamer had played a significant role in its development and the arts in Victoria generally, known as the Melbourne Concert Hall, was renamed the Hamer Hall.

== Family ==
In March 2024, his 31-year-old grand-niece Amelia Hamer was selected as the Liberal candidate for the Division of Kooyong in the 2025 Australian federal election. She lost the election to incumbent MP Monique Ryan.

== Sources ==
- Rodan, Paul (2006). "Rupert "Dick" Hamer: The urbane liberal". In Paul Strangio, Brian Costar (ed.). The Victorian Premiers, 1856–2006: Volume 2. Leichardt: The Federation Press. pp. 294–313. ISBN 978-1-86287-549-4.

Victorian Legislative Council
Preceded by Clifdon Eager	Member for East Yarra Province; 1958–1971	Succeeded by Haddon Storey
Victorian Legislative Assembly
Preceded by Arthur Rylah	Member for Kew; 1971–1981	Succeeded by Prue Sibree
Political offices
Preceded by Sir Arthur Rylah	Deputy Premier of Victoria; 1971–1972	Succeeded by Lindsay Thompson
Preceded by Henry Bolte	Premier of Victoria; 1972–1981	Succeeded by Lindsay Thompson
Preceded by Henry Bolte	Treasurer of Victoria; 1972–1979	Succeeded by Lindsay Thompson
New title	Minister for the Arts; 1972–1979	Succeeded by Norman Lacy
Party political offices
Preceded by Henry Bolte	Leader of the Liberal Party in Victoria; 1972–1981	Succeeded by Lindsay Thompson
