= Coat of arms of Victoria (state) =

Versions
- State badge of Victoria
- Adopted: 6 June 1910; 28 March 1973 (current version)
- Crest: Demi-kangaroo proper, the Crown of St. Edward in its paws (formerly the Tudor Crown)
- Torse: Argent and azure
- Shield: Azure, five stars representing the Southern Cross, argent
- Supporters: Two female figures representing peace and prosperity
- Compartment: Grassy mound with pink heath
- Motto: Peace and Prosperity

The coat of arms of Victoria is the official heraldic symbol of the Australian state of Victoria. Victoria was the second state of Australia to gain arms, granted on 6 June 1910 by royal warrant of King George V. The state had been named in 1851 after his grandmother, who reigned at the time. The current version of the arms was granted 28 March 1978 in the royal warrant issued by Queen Elizabeth II.

== Description ==
The shield of arms shows a blue (azure) field with five argent stars (one of eight points, two of seven points, one of six points and one of five points) arranged to represent the Crux Australis.

The helm facing to the left is situated above the shield and is bearing the torse and originates from the frequent illustrations of early arms incorporating a helmet. This helmet is referred to as a closed or tilting helm, which was used by knights in the Late Medieval and Renaissance eras.

The mantling or lambrequin that surrounds the helmet has two sides, one of colour and the other of a metal. The tinctures are correspondent to the colours of the shield of arms, being azure (blue) and argent (silver).

The crest is a kangaroo holding St Edward's Crown, on a wreath or torse of azure (blue) and silver, which are the official colours of the state. The wreath is situated on top of the helmet, with both the kangaroo and the helmet facing the left side of the shield.

The supporters are derived from their function of supporting the shield on either side. While the supporters of other Australian states' coat of arms are generally animals, they are human figures. The figure on the left, dexter, wears a laurel wreath crown along with a silver gown and an azure stole whilst holding a branch of olive. The action of her carrying an olive branch in her exterior hand, represents "Peace". The figure corresponding, sinister wears a chaplet of corn along with a silver gown and gules stole whist grasping onto a cornucopia. The action of her supporting a cornucopia with her exterior hand represents "Prosperity".

The motto "Peace and Prosperity" is represented by the supporters on both sides of the shield. This motto is also the first to be in English amongst the coats of arms of Australia. With dexter, figure on the left representing "Peace" and sinister, figure on the right representing "Prosperity".

The compartment consists of the pink form of the common heath (Epacris impressa Labill), "pink heath" which is situated on a grassy mound. This provides base for both the supporters and the shield.

=== Blazon ===
The first arms authorised by King George V on 6 June 1910 included a formal description, or blazon of the arms. This was as follows:

- Arms: "Azure, five Stars Argent representing the Constellation of the Southern Cross."
- Crest: "On a Wreath of the Colours, Argent and Azure, a demi-Kangaroo proper holding in the paws an Imperial Crown Or."
- Supporters: "Dexter, a Female Figure (representing Peace) proper vested Argent cloaked Azure wreathed round the temples with a Chaplet and holding in the exterior hand a branch of Olive also proper; and Sinister, a like figure (representing Prosperity) vested Argent cloaked Gules wreathed round the temples with a Chaplet of Corn and supporting with the exterior hand a Cornucopia proper."
- Motto: "Peace and Prosperity"

== Symbolism ==
The Crux Australis, more commonly known as the Southern Cross is considered to be Australia's oldest symbol. Although the Southern Cross has had many different meanings, the symbol has been used since 1823 to represent Australia. The symbol is found on the Australian national flag. One of the designers of the flag, Ivor William Evans at age 14, intended for the Southern Cross to represent the four cardinal values by Dante: prudence, temperance, justice and fortitude. This constellation of five stars can only be seen within the southern hemisphere, uniting Australians under the same sky.

Supposedly deriving from the customs of ancient Greece, the olive branch held upon by Dexter is a symbol of peace. This symbol is coupled by the word "Peace", hence together symbolising peace.

The cornucopia represents the abundance and nourishment that was provided to the ancient Greek god, Zeus, the king of gods during his infant years. This symbol consists of a goat's horn overflowing with an abundant supply of nourishment. Half of the motto, "Prosperity" is represented through Sinister supporting the horn of plenty.

The symbolic languages of flora such as pink heath was originally a reflection of the Enlightenment's interests in astronomy and natural history. During the meeting of representatives of Victorian government departments, societies, and individuals in 1951, it was declared that the pink heath be adopted as the official floral emblem for the state of Victoria. The desire for the flower to represent the state is a part of colonial habit of deference. Governor Dallas Brooks had made the proclamation 12 November 1958.

The Victorian coat of arms is composed of colours that correspond to those used in the Victorian State tartan. Historically, tartans were used as an everyday garb which eventually developed into a symbol of clan kinship. The Victorian State tartan is an emblem that officially represents the state. The tartan was designed after the arms by Betty Johnson in November 1998. The colours of the tartan include blue, white, green, and pink. Each of these colours was designed to represent an element of the arms. Blue represents the colour of the shield. White represents stars on the Southern Cross. Green represents the olive branch and pink represents the pink heath. These colours together represent Victoria.

== Development and change ==
Victoria's official coat of arms between 1910 and 1973

The creation and development request for the Victorian coat of arms to be made begun in late 1909, following the creation of the coat of arms of Australia in 1908. The Victorian Government requested elements of the state badge that was used in Victoria since 1877 to be incorporated into the arms. These elements consisted of a Southern Cross and an Imperial Crown. Without much difficulty all elements of the state badge were implemented, and the design had been approved by the 23rd premier of Victoria, John Murray, by February 1910.

By 6 June 1910, King George V had signed a royal warrant granting the state of Victoria an armorial identification. This version had remained the formal symbol of Victoria until 1973.

The coat of arms of Victoria (Australia) had undergone some reinterpretation and modification before obtaining its finalised version.

The former coat of arms granted by royal warrant of King George V did not include a compartment. It was only until 11 November 1958 when the pink form of the common heath became the proclaimed floral emblem of Victoria, the desire of this flower to be included in the armorial bearing rose.

Meeting the desires of adding the formally proclaimed floral emblem of Victoria, Queen Elizabeth II had issued a royal warrant on 28 March 1973. This royal warrant had added the pink heath along with a grassy mound compartment to provide a base for the supporters and the flower. Although the new armorial bearing had slight modifications, the majority had remained the same. However, with the new armorial bearing being implemented, this had given the opportunity for some elements of the bearing to be reinterpreted.

The depictions of the crown held by the demi-kangaroo have varied throughout the years, in accordance with the different monarchs' that were in reign at the time. Prior to the reign of Elizabeth II in 1953, the Tudor Crown or the Imperial Crown was officially used widely as a symbol in heraldry within the Commonwealth realms and the United Kingdom. However, Elizabeth preferred the St Edward's Crown and this preference was implemented in 1974. The same warrant that added the pink heath and the compartment, had also reinterpreted the previously known Tudor Crown to St Edward's Crown.

== Legal status ==
The Victorian coat of arms is the formal symbol of Victoria, being "the most prestigious branding devices available to the Victorian Government and agencies".

The coat of arms is never to be used without permission, restrictions are in place for their use and reproduction. Commercial use and advertising purposes including the use of the Victorian Government Insignia is not permitted. Victoria is the only state or territory to have specific legislation for its coat of arms which allows action of prosecuting an offender if the coat of arms is used without permission.

The unauthorised use of the arms is subjected to penalty under the Unauthorised Documents Act 1958.

For the use of the arms, formal requests must be submitted, addressing the executive director, Strategic Communication, Engagement and Protocol Branch and Department of Premier and Cabinet through writing. This will only be submitted and emailed to the Department of Premier and Cabinet for processing.

== See also ==
- Flag of Victoria
- Victoria State Government
- Australian heraldry
