= Flag of Victoria (state) =

Victoria
- Use: Civil and state flag
- Proportion: 1:2
- Adopted: 6 March 1870; 156 years ago
- Design: A state badge of a white Southern Cross surmounted by St Edward's Crown, on a defaced British Blue Ensign.

The state flag of Victoria is a British Blue Ensign defaced by the state badge of Victoria in the fly. The badge is the Southern Cross surmounted by St Edward's Crown. The stars of the Southern Cross are white and range from five to eight points with each star having one point pointing to the top of the flag. The flag dates from 1870, with minor variations, the last of which was in 1901. It is the only Australian state flag not to feature the state badge on a round disc.

== History ==
=== 1844 separation flag ===
In 1844, John Harrison, the father of H. C. A. Harrison, designed a flag for the Separation Society, an organisation advocating for the separation of the Port Phillip District (present-day Victoria) from the Colony of New South Wales. The flag, featuring "a white star centred on a crimson ground", was flown at a large open-air meeting on Batman's Hill in June 1844. It was described more fully in the Port Phillip Gazette:

The flag will in size be about seven feet by five, of a deep crimson ground, with a white five pointed star in the middle; on one side the device is a sheep suspended with the words "Squatters, guard your rights," as an inscription, on the counter side are two pillars to represent commerce and agriculture based on the blocks of honor and truth; suspended over and midway between the columns, is a crown supported by a ribbon upon which the word "loyalty" is inscribed; a pair of sheep shears bearing the word "tyranny," cross the ribbon above the crown. The union is pictured in the form of clasped hands between the two pillars, under which is the motto "Keep yourselves and God will keep you." On the point of the pole will he formed gilded kangaroo.

Harrison flew the flag again in 1851 at a meeting of miners on the goldfields at Bendigo.

=== "Crown and Kangaroo" flags ===
Victoria was created as a separate colony in 1851, with responsible government granted in 1855. Prior to the adoption of the southern cross flag in 1870, flags featuring "crown and kangaroo" designs were used for various official purposes, including by HMVS Victoria, the first warship of the Victorian Naval Forces. In 1856, Victorian premier William Clark Haines authorised William Henry Norman, the captain of Victoria, to fly a distinctive red ensign. Exact details of the design are uncertain, but it apparently featured a golden crown and kangaroo. The ensign was also used by the Burke and Wills expedition of 1860, both by the expedition itself and by Victoria on its voyage to the Gulf of Carpentaria to search for the missing party.

In December 1865, the Victoria Government Gazette published a notice requiring boats in the Customs Department to fly a Blue Ensign, in line with the Colonial Naval Defence Act 1865. The "crown and kangaroo" design continued and was adopted by Victoria and other vessels, as shown in contemporary photographs. It was flown in 1867 during the visit of Prince Alfred, Duke of Edinburgh, the first member of the British royal family, and also used on the Duke's ship HMS Galatea where a contemporary source described it as the "Victorian ensign".

=== Previous official flags ===
The first flag of Victoria was adopted in 1870 and was first flown from HMVS Nelson on 9 February 1870. It too was a defaced British Blue Ensign with the Southern Cross located in the fly. The stars of the Southern Cross were white and had 5, 6, 7, 8 and 9 points with only the leftmost and rightmost stars having one point pointing to the top of the flag. The adoption of the flag came about when Victoria became the first Australian colony to acquire a warship, and thus under the British Colonial Naval Defence Act 1865 Victoria needed a flag to distinguish its ships from other British ships. At the same time, the red ensign was incorrectly authorised for use by civil vessels registered in the colony of Victoria. Despite the invalid authorisation, the flag continued to be used, and was flown alongside the Union flag during federation celebrations in 1901. The red ensign did not track changes to the blue ensign, and so no crown was added, nor did the stars rotate to point upwards facing the flag.

Victoria then adopted the current flag in 1877 with the stars of the southern cross from then on having 5, 6, 7, 7 and 8 points. In 1901, the lieutenant-governor advised the secretary of state that henceforth a St Edward's Crown would be used on the now state flag.

== Construction ==
Unlike the national flag, the flag of Victoria is not defined by legislation (either state or federal). As a result, there are no official legal requirements for the construction of the flag of Victoria. However, traditionally the flag has the following elements:

1. the Union Jack occupies the upper quarter next the staff;
2. the fly is wholly blue, in line with the British Blue Ensign;
3. the State Badge is situated with its centre halfway between the edge of the canton and the end of the fly, and to occupy the majority of thereof;
State badge of Victoria

== Gallery ==
Flag of Victoria, 1870–1877

Victorian red ensign, 1870–1877

Flag of Victoria, 1877–1901

Flag of Victoria, 1901–present

== See also ==
- Coat of arms of Victoria
- Standard of the governor of Victoria
- List of Australian flags
- Flags of the governors of the Australian states
