= Electoral results for the district of Kew =

Victoria, Australia, district election results

This is a list of electoral results for the Electoral district of Kew in Victorian state elections.

== Members for Kew ==
Image	Member	Party	Term	Notes
	Wilfrid Kent Hughes (1895–1970)	Nationalist	9 April 1927 – 1931	Served as minister under McPherson and Argyle. Served as Deputy Premier under Argyle and Hollway. Retired. Later held the federal seat of Chisholm and served as minister under Menzies
	Wilfrid Kent Hughes (1895–1970)	United Australia	15 September 1931 – 5 March 1945	Served as minister under McPherson and Argyle. Served as Deputy Premier under Argyle and Hollway. Retired. Later held the federal seat of Chisholm and served as minister under Menzies
	Wilfrid Kent Hughes (1895–1970)	Liberal	5 March 1945 – 22 March 1949	Served as minister under McPherson and Argyle. Served as Deputy Premier under Argyle and Hollway. Retired. Later held the federal seat of Chisholm and served as minister under Menzies
	Wilfrid Kent Hughes (1895–1970)	Liberal and Country	22 March 1949 – 31 October 1949	Served as minister under McPherson and Argyle. Served as Deputy Premier under Argyle and Hollway. Retired. Later held the federal seat of Chisholm and served as minister under Menzies
	Arthur Rylah (1909–1974)	Liberal and Country	17 December 1949 – 1964	Served as Deputy Premier under Bolte. Retired
	Arthur Rylah (1909–1974)	Liberal	1964 – 5 March 1971	Served as Deputy Premier under Bolte. Retired
	Dick Hamer (1916–2004)	Liberal	17 April 1971 – 17 July 1981	Previously a member of the Victorian Legislative Council. Served as minister under Bolte. Served as Premier from 1972 to 1981. Retired
	Prue Sibree (1946–)	Liberal	15 August 1981 – 19 March 1988	Retired
	Jan Wade (1937–)	Liberal	19 March 1988 – 17 September 1999	Served as minister under Kennett. Retired
	Andrew McIntosh (1955–)	Liberal	18 September 1999 – 29 November 2014	Served as minister under Baillieu and Napthine. Resigned
	Tim Smith (1983–)	Liberal	29 November 2014 – 26 November 2022	Retired
	Jess Wilson (1990–)	Liberal	26 November 2022 – present	Incumbent

== Election results ==
=== Elections in the 2020s ===
2022 Victorian state election: Kew
Party	Candidate	Votes	%	±%
Liberal	Jess Wilson	19,321	44.3	−5.0
Labor	Lucy Skelton	9,896	22.7	−8.8
Independent	Sophie Torney	9,200	21.1	+21.1
Greens	Jackie Carter	3,612	8.3	−6.9
Family First	Ann Seeley	751	1.7	+1.7
Animal Justice	Ruby Schofield	507	1.2	−0.9
Independent	Finlay Davis	158	0.4	+0.4
Independent	Kym Sullivan	147	0.3	+0.3
Total formal votes		43,592	97.0	+1.1
Informal votes		1,367	3.0	−1.1
Turnout		44,959	90.1	−2.3
Two-party-preferred result
Liberal	Jess Wilson	23,529	54.0	−0.7
Labor	Lucy Skelton	20,063	46.0	+0.7
Liberal hold		Swing	–0.7	

=== Elections in the 2010s ===
2018 Victorian state election: Kew
Party	Candidate	Votes	%	±%
Liberal	Tim Smith	19,098	49.26	−7.93
Labor	Marg D'Arcy	11,960	30.85	+4.35
Greens	Alex Marks	5,961	15.38	−0.94
Animal Justice	Bronwyn Gardiner	915	2.36	+2.36
Sustainable Australia	Paul Scaturchio	835	2.15	+2.15
Total formal votes		38,769	95.91	+0.02
Informal votes		1,655	4.09	−0.02
Turnout		40,424	91.33	−2.35
Two-party-preferred result
Liberal	Tim Smith	21,231	54.78	−5.87
Labor	Marg D'Arcy	17,528	45.22	+5.87
Liberal hold		Swing	−5.87	

2014 Victorian state election: Kew
Party	Candidate	Votes	%	±%
Liberal	Tim Smith	22,552	57.2	−3.4
Labor	James Gaffey	10,448	26.5	+3.2
Greens	Lynn Frankes	6,433	16.3	+1.9
Total formal votes		39,433	95.9	−0.8
Informal votes		1,691	4.1	+0.8
Turnout		41,124	93.7	+1.1
Two-party-preferred result
Liberal	Tim Smith	23,899	60.6	−5.0
Labor	James Gaffey	15,510	39.4	+5.0
Liberal hold		Swing	−5.0	

2010 Victorian state election: Kew
Party	Candidate	Votes	%	±%
Liberal	Andrew McIntosh	19,878	60.09	+6.35
Labor	Kate Jackson	7,750	23.43	−3.96
Greens	Emma Henley	4,879	14.75	−1.34
Family First	Timothy Hunter	576	1.74	−0.21
Total formal votes		33,083	96.65	−0.64
Informal votes		1,145	3.35	+0.64
Turnout		34,228	92.75	+1.12
Two-party-preferred result
Liberal	Andrew McIntosh	21,560	65.19	+5.63
Labor	Kate Jackson	11,512	34.81	−5.63
Liberal hold		Swing	+5.63	

=== Elections in the 2000s ===
2006 Victorian state election: Kew
Party	Candidate	Votes	%	±%
Liberal	Andrew McIntosh	17,269	53.7	+4.2
Labor	Maree Williams	8,801	27.4	−3.7
Greens	Emma Henley	5,170	16.1	−1.3
Family First	Wallis Pattinsonn	628	2.0	+2.0
Independent	John Dobinson	267	0.8	+0.8
Total formal votes		32,135	97.3	+0.1
Informal votes		896	2.7	−0.1
Turnout		33,031	91.6	
Two-party-preferred result
Liberal	Andrew McIntosh	19,131	59.6	+3.6
Labor	Maree Williams	12,990	40.4	−3.6
Liberal hold		Swing	+3.6	

2002 Victorian state election: Kew
Party	Candidate	Votes	%	±%
Liberal	Andrew McIntosh	15,807	49.5	−12.2
Labor	Maree Williams	9,926	31.1	−2.8
Greens	Cheryl Clark	5,543	17.4	+17.4
Democrats	Mary Dettman	638	2.0	+2.0
Total formal votes		31,914	97.2	−0.4
Informal votes		930	2.8	+0.4
Turnout		32,844	92.6	
Two-party-preferred result
Liberal	Andrew McIntosh	17,865	56.0	−7.8
Labor	Maree Williams	14,049	44.0	+7.8
Liberal hold		Swing	−7.8	

=== Elections in the 1990s ===
1999 Victorian state election: Kew
Party	Candidate	Votes	%	±%
Liberal	Andrew McIntosh	19,594	61.8	−1.9
Labor	Jonathan Lewes	10,751	33.9	+1.1
Hope	Peter Hale	1,380	4.3	+4.3
Total formal votes		31,725	97.6	−0.6
Informal votes		795	2.4	+0.6
Turnout		32,520	91.2	
Two-party-preferred result
Liberal	Andrew McIntosh	20,247	63.8	−1.2
Labor	Jonathan Lewes	11,478	36.2	+1.2
Liberal hold		Swing	−1.2	

1996 Victorian state election: Kew
Party	Candidate	Votes	%	±%
Liberal	Jan Wade	19,946	63.7	−4.2
Labor	Bill Elms	10,275	32.8	+9.2
Natural Law	Gabrielle Dewan	1,101	3.5	+3.5
Total formal votes		31,322	98.2	+1.2
Informal votes		587	1.8	−1.2
Turnout		31,909	93.2	
Two-party-preferred result
Liberal	Jan Wade	20,339	65.0	−6.5
Labor	Bill Elms	10,949	35.0	+6.5
Liberal hold		Swing	−6.5	

1992 Victorian state election: Kew
Party	Candidate	Votes	%	±%
Liberal	Jan Wade	20,484	67.9	+5.6
Labor	Wayne Clarke	7,115	23.6	−14.2
Independent	Jonathan Shepherd	2,570	8.5	+8.5
Total formal votes		30,169	97.0	+0.3
Informal votes		946	3.0	−0.3
Turnout		31,115	94.1	
Two-party-preferred result
Liberal	Jan Wade	21,553	71.5	+9.3
Labor	Wayne Clarke	8,578	28.5	−9.3
Liberal hold		Swing	+9.3	

=== Elections in the 1980s ===
1988 Victorian state election: Kew
Party	Candidate	Votes	%	±%
Liberal	Jan Wade	15,715	61.00	+0.80
Labor	Tim Muffet	10,048	39.00	−0.80
Total formal votes		25,763	96.51	−0.58
Informal votes		932	3.49	+0.58
Turnout		26,695	90.37	−1.54
Liberal hold		Swing	+0.80	

1988 Kew state by-election
Party	Candidate	Votes	%	±%
Liberal	Jan Wade	12,824	54.56	−5.64
Labor	Tim Muffet	4,897	20.84	−18.96
Democrats	Sonia O'Brien	4,607	19.60	+19.60
Democratic Labor	Mark Beshara	798	3.40	+3.40
Independent	Bill Thiele	377	1.60	+1.60
Total formal votes		23,503	97.16	
Informal votes		686	2.84	
Turnout		24,189	81.40	
Two-party-preferred result
Liberal	Jan Wade		65.4	+5.2
Labor	Tim Muffet		34.6	−5.2
Liberal hold		Swing	+5.2	

1985 Victorian state election: Kew
Party	Candidate	Votes	%	±%
Liberal	Prue Sibree	16,403	60.2	+4.4
Labor	Annamaria Dierer	10,843	39.8	+5.8
Total formal votes		27,246	97.1	
Informal votes		818	2.9	
Turnout		28,064	91.9	
Liberal hold		Swing	−0.3	

1982 Victorian state election: Kew
Party	Candidate	Votes	%	±%
Liberal	Prue Sibree	14,123	55.8	+1.4
Labor	George Theodoridis	8,615	34.0	+2.7
Democrats	Veronica Lysaght	2,569	10.2	+2.9
Total formal votes		25,307	98.1	+0.4
Informal votes		499	1.9	−0.4
Turnout		25,806	92.7	+1.5
Two-party-preferred result
Liberal	Prue Sibree	15,215	60.1	−1.1
Labor	George Theodoridis	10,092	39.9	+1.1
Liberal hold		Swing	−1.1	

1981 Kew state by-election
Party	Candidate	Votes	%	±%
Liberal	Prue Sibree	9,877	49.5	−4.9
Labor	Iain Messer	5,998	30.1	−1.2
Democrats	Veronica Lysaght	2,327	11.7	+4.4
Democratic Labor	Daniel Condon	1,277	6.4	−0.7
Independent	Peter Allan	323	1.6	+1.6
Independent	Kevin Tehan	154	0.8	+0.8
Total formal votes		19,956	97.4	−0.3
Informal votes		533	2.6	+0.3
Turnout		20,489	71.2	−20.0
After distribution of preferences
Liberal	Prue Sibree	10,211	51.2	N/A
Labor	Iain Messer	6,145	30.8	N/A
Democrats	Veronica Lysaght	3,600	18.0	N/A
Liberal hold		Swing	N/A	

=== Elections in the 1970s ===
1979 Victorian state election: Kew
Party	Candidate	Votes	%	±%
Liberal	Rupert Hamer	14,096	54.4	−3.3
Labor	Wesley Blackmore	8,102	31.3	+5.1
Democrats	Keith Bruckner	1,894	7.3	+7.3
Democratic Labor	Standish Keon	1,827	7.1	+2.9
Total formal votes		25,919	97.7	−0.4
Informal votes		597	2.3	+0.4
Turnout		26,516	91.2	−0.4
Two-party-preferred result
Liberal	Rupert Hamer	15,875	61.2	−8.8
Labor	Wesley Blackmore	10,044	38.8	+8.8
Liberal hold		Swing	−8.8	

1976 Victorian state election: Kew
Party	Candidate	Votes	%	±%
Liberal	Rupert Hamer	15,379	57.7	−6.0
Labor	Gary Jungwirth	6,997	26.2	−1.7
Independent	Charles Barrington	1,713	6.4	+6.4
Independent	Margaret Tighe	1,455	5.5	+5.5
Democratic Labor	Francis Duffy	1,121	4.2	−4.1
Total formal votes		26,665	98.1	
Informal votes		516	1.9	
Turnout		27,181	91.6	
Two-party-preferred result
Liberal	Rupert Hamer	18,670	70.0	−1.1
Labor	Gary Jungwirth	7,995	30.0	+1.1
Liberal hold		Swing	−1.1	

1973 Victorian state election: Kew
Party	Candidate	Votes	%	±%
Liberal	Rupert Hamer	16,018	64.7	+23.0
Labor	James Hilson	6,603	26.7	+0.9
Democratic Labor	Francis Duffy	2,148	8.7	−5.1
Total formal votes		24,769	98.0	+1.2
Informal votes		494	2.0	−1.2
Turnout		25,263	90.3	−2.7
Two-party-preferred result
Liberal	Rupert Hamer	17,844	72.0	+12.6
Labor	James Hilson	6,925	28.0	−12.6
Liberal hold		Swing	+12.6	

1971 Kew state by-election
Party	Candidate	Votes	%	±%
Liberal	Rupert Hamer	13,422	64.8	+23.1
Labor	Rosslyn Ives	6,325	30.5	+4.7
Independent	L R Hull	968	4.7	+4.7
Total formal votes		20,715	97.7	+0.5
Informal votes		497	2.3	−0.5
Turnout		21,212	82.8	−10.2
Liberal hold		Swing	N/A	

- Preferences were not distributed as Hamer won with an absolute majority of votes (50% of votes).

1970 Victorian state election: Kew
Party	Candidate	Votes	%	±%
Liberal	Arthur Rylah	9,692	41.7	−12.9
Labor	Rosslyn Ives	5,987	25.8	−1.1
Democratic Labor	Francis Duffy	3,212	13.8	−4.7
Independent	Bertram Wainer	2,624	11.3	+11.3
Independent	Dorothy Buchanan	1,727	7.4	+7.4
Total formal votes		23,242	96.8	−0.4
Informal votes		756	3.2	+0.4
Turnout		23,998	93.0	−0.4
Two-party-preferred result
Liberal	Arthur Rylah	13,808	59.4	−10.9
Labor	Rosslyn Ives	9,434	40.6	+10.9
Liberal hold		Swing	−10.9	

=== Elections in the 1960s ===
1967 Victorian state election: Kew
Party	Candidate	Votes	%	±%
Liberal	Arthur Rylah	12,712	54.6	−3.3
Labor	Eric Sibly	6,261	26.9	+0.6
Democratic Labor	Francis Duffy	4,305	18.5	+2.7
Total formal votes		23,278	97.2	
Informal votes		664	2.8	
Turnout		23,942	93.4	
Two-party-preferred result
Liberal	Arthur Rylah	16,372	70.3	−1.1
Labor	Eric Sibly	6,906	29.7	+1.1
Liberal hold		Swing	−1.1	

1964 Victorian state election: Kew
Party	Candidate	Votes	%	±%
Liberal and Country	Arthur Rylah	11,319	59.3	−0.2
Labor	William Cooper	4,785	25.1	+2.3
Democratic Labor	Francis Duffy	2,991	15.7	−0.2
Total formal votes		19,095	98.1	+0.5
Informal votes		378	1.9	−0.5
Turnout		19,473	91.0	−0.9
Two-party-preferred result
Liberal and Country	Arthur Rylah	13,861	72.6	−0.6
Labor	William Cooper	5,234	27.4	+0.6
Liberal and Country hold		Swing	−0.6	

1961 Victorian state election: Kew
Party	Candidate	Votes	%	±%
Liberal and Country	Arthur Rylah	11,452	59.5	−3.1
Labor	William Cooper	4,384	22.8	+3.3
Democratic Labor	Francis Duffy	3,068	15.9	+0.2
Communist	Eric Thornton	357	1.8	−0.4
Total formal votes		19,261	97.6	−0.5
Informal votes		466	2.4	+0.5
Turnout		19,727	91.9	−0.2
Two-party-preferred result
Liberal and Country	Arthur Rylah	14,096	73.2	−3.0
Labor	William Cooper	5,165	26.8	+3.0
Liberal and Country hold		Swing	−3.0	

=== Elections in the 1950s ===
1958 Victorian state election: Kew
Party	Candidate	Votes	%	±%
Liberal and Country	Arthur Rylah	12,375	62.6	
Labor	Kevin Lynch	3,845	19.5	
Democratic Labor	John Buchanan	3,108	15.7	
Communist	Ralph Gibson	425	2.2	
Total formal votes		19,753	98.1	
Informal votes		372	1.9	
Turnout		20,125	92.1	
Two-party-preferred result
Liberal and Country	Arthur Rylah	15,058	76.2	
Labor	Kevin Lynch	4,695	23.8	
Liberal and Country hold		Swing		

1955 Victorian state election: Kew
Party	Candidate	Votes	%	±%
Liberal and Country	Arthur Rylah	14,152	71.6	
Labor	Norman Williams	4,883	24.7	
Communist	Ralph Gibson	731	3.7	
Total formal votes		19,766	98.0	
Informal votes		401	2.0	
Turnout		20,167	91.4	
Two-party-preferred result
Liberal and Country	Arthur Rylah	14,225	72.0	
Labor	Norman Williams	5,541	28.0	
Liberal and Country hold		Swing		

1952 Victorian state election: Kew
Party	Candidate	Votes	%	±%
Liberal and Country	Arthur Rylah	7,780	37.4	−62.6
Labor	Norman Williams	6,696	32.2	+32.2
Electoral Reform	John Eddy	6,303	30.3	+30.3
Total formal votes		20,779	98.0	
Informal votes		418	2.0	
Turnout		21,197	93.3	
Two-party-preferred result
Liberal and Country	Arthur Rylah	13,076	62.9	−37.1
Labor	Norman Williams	7,703	37.1	+37.1
Liberal and Country hold		Swing	N/A	

1950 Victorian state election: Kew
Party	Candidate	Votes	%	±%
Liberal and Country	Arthur Rylah	unopposed		
Liberal and Country hold		Swing		

=== Elections in the 1940s ===
1949 Kew state by-election
Party	Candidate	Votes	%	±%
Liberal and Country	Arthur Rylah	14,480	74.8	+3.7
Independent	Thomas Fynmore	4,888	25.2	+25.2
Total formal votes		19,368	95.5	−3.6
Informal votes		912	4.5	+3.6
Turnout		20,280	83.6	−6.4
Liberal and Country hold		Swing	N/A	

1947 Victorian state election: Kew
Party	Candidate	Votes	%	±%
Liberal	Wilfrid Kent Hughes	16,528	71.2	−28.8
Labor	Rupert Purchase	6,694	28.8	+28.8
Total formal votes		23,222	99.1	
Informal votes		204	0.9	
Turnout		23,426	90.0	
Liberal hold		Swing	N/A	

1945 Victorian state election: Kew
Party	Candidate	Votes	%	±%
Liberal	Wilfrid Kent Hughes	unopposed		
Liberal hold		Swing		

1943 Victorian state election: Kew
Party	Candidate	Votes	%	±%
United Australia	Wilfrid Kent Hughes	unopposed		
United Australia hold		Swing		

1940 Victorian state election: Kew
Party	Candidate	Votes	%	±%
United Australia	Wilfrid Hughes	18,496	68.0	−0.1
Labor	Arthur Kyle	8,716	32.0	+0.1
Total formal votes		27,212	98.8	0.0
Informal votes		321	1.2	0.0
Turnout		27,533	92.8	+0.8
United Australia hold		Swing	−0.1	

=== Elections in the 1930s ===
1937 Victorian state election: Kew
Party	Candidate	Votes	%	±%
United Australia	Wilfrid Hughes	17,053	68.1	+2.2
Labor	Arthur Kyle	8,002	31.9	−2.2
Total formal votes		25,055	98.8	+0.1
Informal votes		315	1.2	−0.1
Turnout		25,370	92.0	−1.5
United Australia hold		Swing	+2.2	

1935 Victorian state election: Kew
Party	Candidate	Votes	%	±%
United Australia	Wilfrid Hughes	15,641	65.9	−11.4
Labor	Thomas Botsman	8,090	34.1	+11.4
Total formal votes		23,731	98.7	−0.2
Informal votes		305	1.3	+0.2
Turnout		24,036	93.5	+1.4
United Australia hold		Swing	−11.4	

1932 Victorian state election: Kew
Party	Candidate	Votes	%	±%
United Australia	Kent Hughes	17,566	77.3	+15.3
Labor	Thomas Mottram	5,148	22.7	−8.8
Total formal votes		22,714	98.9	+0.3
Informal votes		263	1.1	−0.3
Turnout		22,977	92.1	−1.2
United Australia hold		Swing	+11.6	

=== Elections in the 1920s ===
1929 Victorian state election: Kew
Party	Candidate	Votes	%	±%
Nationalist	Kent Hughes	13,551	62.0	+29.7
Labor	Cyril Murphy	6,889	31.5	+6.7
Independent	Constantine Crowley	1,399	6.4	+6.4
Total formal votes		21,839	98.6	+1.0
Informal votes		304	1.4	−1.0
Turnout		22,143	93.3	+0.2
Two-party-preferred result
Nationalist	Kent Hughes		65.7	+21.5
Labor	Cyril Murphy		34.3	+34.3
Nationalist gain from Ind. Nationalist		Swing	N/A	

- Two party preferred vote was estimated.

1927 Victorian state election: Kew
Party	Candidate	Votes	%	±%
Nationalist	Edward Reynolds	6,346	32.3	
Labor	Frederick Riley	4,877	24.8	
Independent	Wilfred Hughes	4,727	24.1	
Australian Liberal	William Clark	3,696	18.8	
Total formal votes		19,646	97.6	
Informal votes		475	2.4	
Turnout		20,121	93.1	
Two-candidate-preferred result
Independent	Wilfred Hughes	10,964	55.8	
Nationalist	Edward Reynolds	8,682	44.2	
Independent gain from Nationalist		Swing		
