= Electoral results for the district of Kororoit =

Victoria, Australia, district election results

This is a list of electoral results for the Electoral district of Kororoit in Victorian state elections.

== Members for Kororoit ==
Member	Party	Term
Andre Haermeyer	Labor	2002–2008
Marlene Kairouz	Labor	2008–2022
Luba Grigorovitch	Labor	2022–present

== Election results ==
=== Elections in the 2020s ===
2022 Victorian state election: Kororoit
Party	Candidate	Votes	%	±%
Labor	Luba Grigorovitch	17,468	43.3	−20.1
Liberal	John Fletcher	9,801	24.3	+3.5
Victorian Socialists	Belle Gibson	2,768	6.9	+6.9
Greens	Ben Chester	2,650	6.6	−1.7
Democratic Labour	Zuzanna Brown	2,517	6.2	+6.2
Family First	Melanie Milutinovic	2,326	5.8	+5.8
Animal Justice	Katherine Divita	1,242	3.1	−4.5
Independent	Joh Bauch	978	2.4	+2.4
New Democrats	Jaz Chandok	623	1.5	+1.5
Total formal votes		40,373	91.6	–1.2
Informal votes		3,683	8.4	+1.2
Turnout		44,056	86.3	+3.5
Two-party-preferred result
Labor	Luba Grigorovitch	26,047	64.5	−10.8
Liberal	John Fletcher	14,326	35.5	+10.8
Labor hold		Swing	−10.8	

=== Elections in the 2010s ===
2018 Victorian state election: Kororoit
Party	Candidate	Votes	%	±%
Labor	Marlene Kairouz	26,769	63.51	+3.21
Liberal	Golam Haque	8,584	20.37	−1.55
Greens	Rohan Waring	3,615	8.58	+1.21
Animal Justice	Katherine Divita	3,180	7.54	+7.54
Total formal votes		42,148	92.82	−0.49
Informal votes		3,262	7.18	+0.49
Turnout		45,410	88.76	−3.29
Two-party-preferred result
Labor	Marlene Kairouz	31,719	75.65	+5.67
Liberal	Golam Haque	10,212	24.35	−5.67
Labor hold		Swing	+5.67	

2014 Victorian state election: Kororoit
Party	Candidate	Votes	%	±%
Labor	Marlene Kairouz	23,913	60.3	+6.7
Liberal	Goran Kesic	8,690	21.9	−2.9
Greens	Philip Hill	2,921	7.4	−3.7
Independent	Margaret Giudice	2,918	7.4	+7.4
Voice for the West	Shashi Turner	1,215	3.1	+3.1
Total formal votes		39,657	93.3	+1.0
Informal votes		2,843	6.7	−1.0
Turnout		42,500	92.0	+3.4
Two-party-preferred result
Labor	Marlene Kairouz	27,791	70.0	+2.5
Liberal	Goran Kesic	11,922	30.0	−2.5
Labor hold		Swing	+2.5	

2010 Victorian state election: Kororoit
Party	Candidate	Votes	%	±%
Labor	Marlene Kairouz	19,891	55.82	+7.82
Liberal	Goran Kesic	8,912	25.01	+3.98
Greens	Anastasia Smietanka	3,513	9.86	+5.23
Independent	Kathy Majdlik	1,888	5.30	+5.30
Family First	Glenn Rozec	1,432	4.02	+4.02
Total formal votes		35,636	92.05	−1.64
Informal votes		3,076	7.95	+1.64
Turnout		38,712	91.09	+7.78
Two-party-preferred result
Labor	Marlene Kairouz	24,453	68.58	+9.62
Liberal	Goran Kesic	11,203	31.42	+31.42
Labor hold		Swing	+9.62	

=== Elections in the 2000s ===
2008 Kororoit state by-election
Party	Candidate	Votes	%	±%
Labor	Marlene Kairouz	15,339	48.50	−13.12
Liberal	Jenny Matic	6,650	21.03	+5.06
Independent	Les Twentyman	6,451	20.40	+20.40
Greens	Marcus Power	1,465	4.63	−2.61
Independent	Tania Walters	1,292	4.08	+4.08
Citizens Electoral Council	Andre Kozlowski	432	1.37	−0.80
Total formal votes		31,629	93.69	−1.50
Informal votes		2,129	6.31	+1.50
Turnout		33,758	83.31	−8.96
Two-candidate-preferred result
Labor	Marlene Kairouz	18,738	58.96	−16.60
Independent	Les Twentyman	13,044	41.04	+41.04
Labor hold		Swing	−16.60	

2006 Victorian state election: Kororoit
Party	Candidate	Votes	%	±%
Labor	Andre Haermeyer	19,978	61.6	−7.2
Liberal	Mick Alexander	5,177	16.0	−1.9
Family First	Tania Walters	4,218	13.0	+13.0
Greens	Marcus Power	2,346	7.2	+7.2
Citizens Electoral Council	Andre Kozlowski	702	2.2	+2.2
Total formal votes		32,421	92.2	−1.9
Informal votes		2,745	7.8	+1.9
Turnout		35,166	92.1	
Two-party-preferred result
Labor	Andre Haermeyer	24,482	75.6	−1.5
Liberal	Mick Alexander	7,920	24.4	+1.5
Labor hold		Swing	−1.5	

2002 Victorian state election: Kororoit
Party	Candidate	Votes	%	±%
Labor	Andre Haermeyer	20,894	68.8	+0.8
Liberal	Joe Fenech	5,439	17.9	−8.6
Independent	Amanda George	2,384	7.8	+7.8
Independent	Bernard Reilly	1,673	5.5	+5.5
Total formal votes		30,390	94.0	−0.3
Informal votes		1,924	6.0	+0.3
Turnout		32,314	91.7	
Two-party-preferred result
Labor	Andre Haermeyer	23,415	77.1	+6.3
Liberal	Joe Fenech	6,973	22.9	−6.3
Labor hold		Swing	+6.3	
