= Electoral results for the district of Yan Yean =

Victoria, Australia, district election results

This is a list of electoral results for the district of Yan Yean in Victorian state elections.

== Members for Yan Yean ==
Image	Member	Party	Term	Notes
	Andre Haermeyer (1956–)	Labor	3 October 1992 – 30 November 2002	Moved to district of Kororoit
	Danielle Green (1963–)	Labor	30 November 2002 – 26 November 2022	Retired
	Lauren Kathage	Labor	26 November 2022 – present	Incumbent

== Election results ==
=== Elections in the 2020s ===
==== 2022 ====
2022 Victorian state election: Yan Yean
Party	Candidate	Votes	%	±%
Labor	Lauren Kathage	16,328	41.4	−14.5
Liberal	Richard Welch	13,361	33.9	+6.2
Greens	Samantha Mason	2,537	6.4	+1.1
Democratic Labour	Jack Wooldridge	2,028	5.1	+1.6
Family First	James Hall	1,284	3.3	+3.3
Animal Justice	Ruth Parramore	1,043	2.7	+2.4
Shooters, Fishers, Farmers	Alexandar Krstic	1,024	2.6	−1.1
Freedom	Con Bouroutzis	1,021	2.6	+2.6
Justice	Mandy Anne Grimley	793	2.0	+2.0
Total formal votes		39,415	94.1	+1.4
Informal votes		2,475	5.9	−1.4
Turnout		41,890	88.5	+8.7
Two-party-preferred result
Labor	Lauren Kathage	21,390	54.3	−12.7
Liberal	Richard Welch	18,025	45.7	+12.7
Labor hold		Swing	−12.7	

=== Elections in the 2010s ===
==== 2018 ====
2018 Victorian state election: Yan Yean
Party	Candidate	Votes	%	±%
Labor	Danielle Green	26,717	54.30	+11.29
Liberal	Meralyn Klein	13,324	27.08	−14.77
Greens	Hugh McKinnon	3,354	6.82	−0.42
Shooters, Fishers, Farmers	David Snelling	2,244	4.56	+4.56
Democratic Labour	Arthur Bablis	1,845	3.75	+3.75
Liberty Alliance	Siobhann Brown	1,232	2.50	+2.50
Independent	Yassin Albarri	254	0.52	+0.52
Independent	Munish Bansal	234	0.48	+0.48
Total formal votes		49,204	92.50	−2.39
Informal votes		3,987	7.50	+2.39
Turnout		53,191	91.46	−3.90
Two-party-preferred result
Labor	Danielle Green	32,999	67.03	+13.37
Liberal	Meralyn Klein	16,234	32.97	−13.37
Labor hold		Swing	+13.37	

==== 2014 ====
2014 Victorian state election: Yan Yean
Party	Candidate	Votes	%	±%
Labor	Danielle Green	17,499	43.0	+3.6
Liberal	Sam Ozturk	17,030	41.9	−2.5
Greens	Daniel Sacchero	2,945	7.2	−2.0
Family First	Rodney Baker	1,157	2.8	−0.4
Shooters and Fishers	Rob Clark	1,111	2.7	+2.7
Country Alliance	Bruce Stevens	715	1.8	+1.1
Rise Up Australia	Geraldine Roelink	232	0.6	+0.6
Total formal votes		40,689	94.9	−0.0
Informal votes		2,188	5.1	+0.0
Turnout		42,877	95.4	+10.9
Two-party-preferred result
Labor	Danielle Green	21,831	53.7	+3.7
Liberal	Sam Ozturk	18,858	46.3	−3.7
Labor gain from Liberal		Swing	+3.7	

==== 2010 ====
2010 Victorian state election: Yan Yean
Party	Candidate	Votes	%	±%
Labor	Danielle Green	20,990	42.90	−4.53
Liberal	Jack Gange	19,612	40.08	+5.45
Greens	Karin Geradts	4,916	10.05	+0.47
Democratic Labor	Patrick Shea	1,728	3.53	+3.53
Family First	Andrew McPherson	1,684	3.44	−0.02
Total formal votes		48,930	95.09	−1.11
Informal votes		2,527	4.91	+1.11
Turnout		51,457	95.05	+0.35
Two-party-preferred result
Labor	Danielle Green	26,498	54.07	−3.92
Liberal	Jack Gange	22,506	45.93	+3.92
Labor hold		Swing	−3.92	

=== Elections in the 2000s ===
==== 2006 ====
2006 Victorian state election: Yan Yean
Party	Candidate	Votes	%	±%
Labor	Danielle Green	17,751	47.4	−2.1
Liberal	Aneta Ivanovski	12,963	34.6	−3.8
Greens	Karin Geradts	3,586	9.6	−1.3
Family First	Matthew Field	1,295	3.5	+3.5
Independent	Belinda Clarkson	1,119	3.0	+3.0
People Power	Brian Mawhinney	714	1.9	+1.9
Total formal votes		37,428	96.2	−0.9
Informal votes		1,479	3.8	+0.9
Turnout		38,907	94.7	
Two-party-preferred result
Labor	Danielle Green	21,675	57.9	−1.6
Liberal	Aneta Ivanovski	15,753	42.1	+1.6
Labor hold		Swing	−1.6	

==== 2002 ====
2002 Victorian state election: Yan Yean
Party	Candidate	Votes	%	±%
Labor	Danielle Green	15,980	49.5	+4.0
Liberal	Matthew Guy	12,396	38.4	−9.9
Greens	Patrick Vaughan	3,503	10.9	+9.5
Citizens Electoral Council	Simon Steer	380	1.2	+1.2
Total formal votes		32,259	97.1	−0.3
Informal votes		952	2.9	+0.3
Turnout		33,211	95.2	
Two-party-preferred result
Labor	Danielle Green	19,204	59.5	+10.2
Liberal	Matthew Guy	13,055	40.5	−10.2
Labor gain from Liberal		Swing	+10.2	

=== Elections in the 1990s ===
==== 1999 ====
1999 Victorian state election: Yan Yean
Party	Candidate	Votes	%	±%
Labor	Andre Haermeyer	18,265	51.6	+1.4
Liberal	Heather Tivendale	15,397	43.5	−3.7
Independent	Lynlee Smith	1,371	3.9	+3.9
Natural Law	Byron Rigby	341	1.0	−1.5
Total formal votes		35,374	97.1	−0.6
Informal votes		1,048	2.9	+0.6
Turnout		36,422	95.1	
Two-party-preferred result
Labor	Andre Haermeyer	19,170	54.2	+2.6
Liberal	Heather Tivendale	16,204	45.8	−2.6
Labor hold		Swing	+2.6	

==== 1996 ====
1996 Victorian state election: Yan Yean
Party	Candidate	Votes	%	±%
Labor	Andre Haermeyer	16,264	50.3	+7.8
Liberal	Barb Jones	15,291	47.3	+3.2
Natural Law	David Snowman	796	2.5	−2.9
Total formal votes		32,351	97.7	+2.3
Informal votes		760	2.3	−2.3
Turnout		33,111	95.5	
Two-party-preferred result
Labor	Andre Haermeyer	16,700	51.6	−0.3
Liberal	Barb Jones	15,635	48.4	+0.3
Labor hold		Swing	−0.3	

==== 1992 ====
1992 Victorian state election: Yan Yean
Party	Candidate	Votes	%	±%
Liberal	Bill Willis	12,567	44.1	+1.6
Labor	Andre Haermeyer	12,113	42.5	−14.9
Natural Law	Julie Nihill	1,515	5.3	+5.3
Independent	Nazio Mancini	1,411	5.0	+5.0
Independent	Eleonora Cichello	430	1.5	+1.5
Independent	Trevor Goodwin	257	0.9	+0.9
Independent	Peter Brambilla	210	0.7	+0.7
Total formal votes		28,503	95.4	−0.6
Informal votes		1,359	4.6	+0.6
Turnout		29,862	96.5	
Two-party-preferred result
Labor	Andre Haermeyer	14,754	51.9	−5.5
Liberal	Bill Willis	13,665	48.1	+5.5
Labor hold		Swing	−5.5	
