= Kennett ministry =

64th ministry of the Government of Victoria

Kennett Ministry
- 64th ministry of Victoria, Australia
- Date formed: October 6, 1992
- Date dissolved: October 20, 1999

People and organisations
- Monarch: Elizabeth II
- Governor: Richard McGarvie
- Premier: Jeff Kennett
- Deputy premier: Pat McNamara
- No. of ministers: 18
- Member party: Liberal–National Coalition
- Status in legislature: Coalition majority government
- Opposition party: Labor
- Opposition leaders: Joan Kirner (until 22 March 1993); Jim Kennan (22 March 1993 to 29 June 1993); John Brumby (29 June 1993 to 22 March 1999); Steve Bracks (22 March 1999 to 20 October 1999)

History
- Elections: 1992 state election 1996 state election
- Predecessor: Kirner ministry
- Successor: Bracks ministry

The Kennett Ministry was the 64th ministry of the Government of Victoria. It was led by the Premier of Victoria, Jeff Kennett, of the Liberal Party. The ministry was sworn in on October 6, 1992, and remained a single ministry through two parliaments until on October 20, 1999.

== Ministry ==
=== 3 April 1996 - 20 October 1999 ===
Party	Minister	Portfolios
Liberal	Jeff Kennett, MP	Premier; Minister for Multicultural Affairs; Minister for the Arts
National	Pat McNamara, MP	Deputy Premier; Minister for Agriculture and Resources
Liberal	Denis Napthine, MP	Treasurer (from 7 October 1999); Minister for Youth and Community Services
Liberal	Phil Gude, MP	Minister for Education
Liberal	Mark Birrell, MLC	Minister for Industry, Science and Technology; Minister for Information Technology and Multimedia (from 7 October 1999)
Liberal	Rob Knowles, MLC	Minister for Health; Minister for Aged Care
National	Bill McGrath, MP	Minister for Police and Emergency Services; Minister for Corrections
Liberal	Alan Stockdale, MP	Treasurer (to 7 October 1999); Minister for Multimedia (to 6 January 1997); Minister for Information Technology and Multimedia (6 January 1997 to 7 October 1999)
Liberal	Rob Maclellan, MP	Minister for Planning and Local Government
Liberal	Marie Tehan, MP	Minister for Conservation and Land Management
Liberal	Alan Brown, MP	Minister of Transport (to 6 January 1997)
Liberal	Jan Wade, MP	Attorney-General; Minister for Fair Trading; Minister for Women's Affairs
National	Roger Hallam, MLC	Minister for Finance; Minister for Gaming
Liberal	Tom Reynolds, MP	Minister for Sport; Minister for Rural Development
Liberal	Louise Asher, MLC	Minister for Small Business; Minister for Tourism
Liberal	Geoff Craige, MLC	Minister for Roads and Ports
Liberal	Ann Handerson, MP	Minister for Housing; Minister responsible for Aboriginal Affairs
Liberal	Phil Honeywood, MP	Minister for Tertiary Education and Training; Minister assisting the Premier on Multicultural Affairs
Liberal	Rosemary Varty, MLC	Parliamentary Secretary of the Cabinet
Liberal	Robin Cooper, MP	Minister of Transport (from 6 January 1997)

=== 6 October 1992 - 3 April 1996 ===
Party	Minister	Portfolios
Liberal	Jeff Kennett, MP	Premier; Minister for Ethnic Affairs; Minister for Finance (1 June 1995 to 13 June 1995)
National	Pat McNamara, MP	Deputy Premier; Minister for Police and Emergency Services; Minister for Corrections; Minister for Tourism; Minister for Agriculture (until 9 November 1992)
Liberal	Alan Stockdale, MP	Treasurer
Liberal	Phil Gude, MP	Minister for Industry and Employment; Minister for Industry Services; Minister for Small Business; Minister for Youth Affairs (until 9 November 1992); Minister for Regional Development (from 13 June 1995)
Liberal	Mark Birrell, MLC	Minister for Major Projects; Minister for Conservation and Environment
Liberal	Haddon Storey, MLC	Minister for Tertiary Education and Training; Minister for the Arts; Minister for Gaming
National	Bill Baxter, MLC	Minister for Roads and Ports
Liberal	Rob Maclellan, MP	Minister for Planning
Liberal	Ian Smith, MP	Minister for Finance (until 30 May 1995)
Liberal	Jim Plowman, MP	Minister for Energy and Minerals; Minister Assisting the Treasurer on State Owned Enterprises
Liberal	Marie Tehan, MP	Minister for Health Services(until 9 November 1992); Minister for Health (from 9 November 1992); Minister for Community Services; Minister for Aboriginal Affairs (until 9 November 1992)
Liberal	Alan Brown, MP	Minister for Public Transport
Liberal	Rob Knowles, MLC	Minister for Housing; Minister for Aged Care
Liberal	Don Hayward, MP	Minister for Education
Liberal	Jan Wade, MP	Attorney-General; Minister for Fair Trading; Minister for Women's Affairs
National	Roger Hallam, MLC	Minister for Local Government; Minister for Workcare (until 22 December 1992); Minister for Regional Development (until 13 June 1995); Minister for Finance (from 13 June 1995)
Liberal	Geoff Coleman, MP	Minister for Natural Resources
Liberal	Tom Reynolds, MP	Minister for Sport, Recreation and Racing
Liberal	Rosemary Varty, MLC	Parliamentary Secretary of the Cabinet
Liberal	Vin Heffernan, MP	Minister for Small Business; Minister responsible for Youth Affairs (from 9 November 1992)
Liberal	Michael John, MP	Minister for Community Services; Minister responsible for Aboriginal Affairs (from 9 November 1992)
National	Bill McGrath, MP	Minister for Agriculture (from 9 November 1992)
Liberal	Roger Pescott, MP	Minister for Industry Services (from 9 November 1992)

Parliament of Victoria
Preceded by Kirner Ministry (1990–1992)	Kennett Ministry; 1992–1999	Succeeded by Bracks Ministry (1999-2007)
