= Minister for Consumer Affairs, Gaming and Liquor Regulation =

Minister for Consumer Affairs, Gaming and Liquor Regulation may refer to:

- Minister for Casino, Gaming and Liquor Regulation, (Victoria)
- Minister for Consumer Affairs (Victoria)
