= Minister for Consumer Affairs =

Consumer Affairs may refer to:

- Minister for Consumer Affairs (Victoria)
- Minister for Fair Trading, New South Wales
- Minister for Consumer Affairs (United Kingdom), a former post in the Cabinet of the United Kingdom under Margaret Thatcher and John Major
