= Cecile Storey =

Australian teacher

Cecile Storey AM
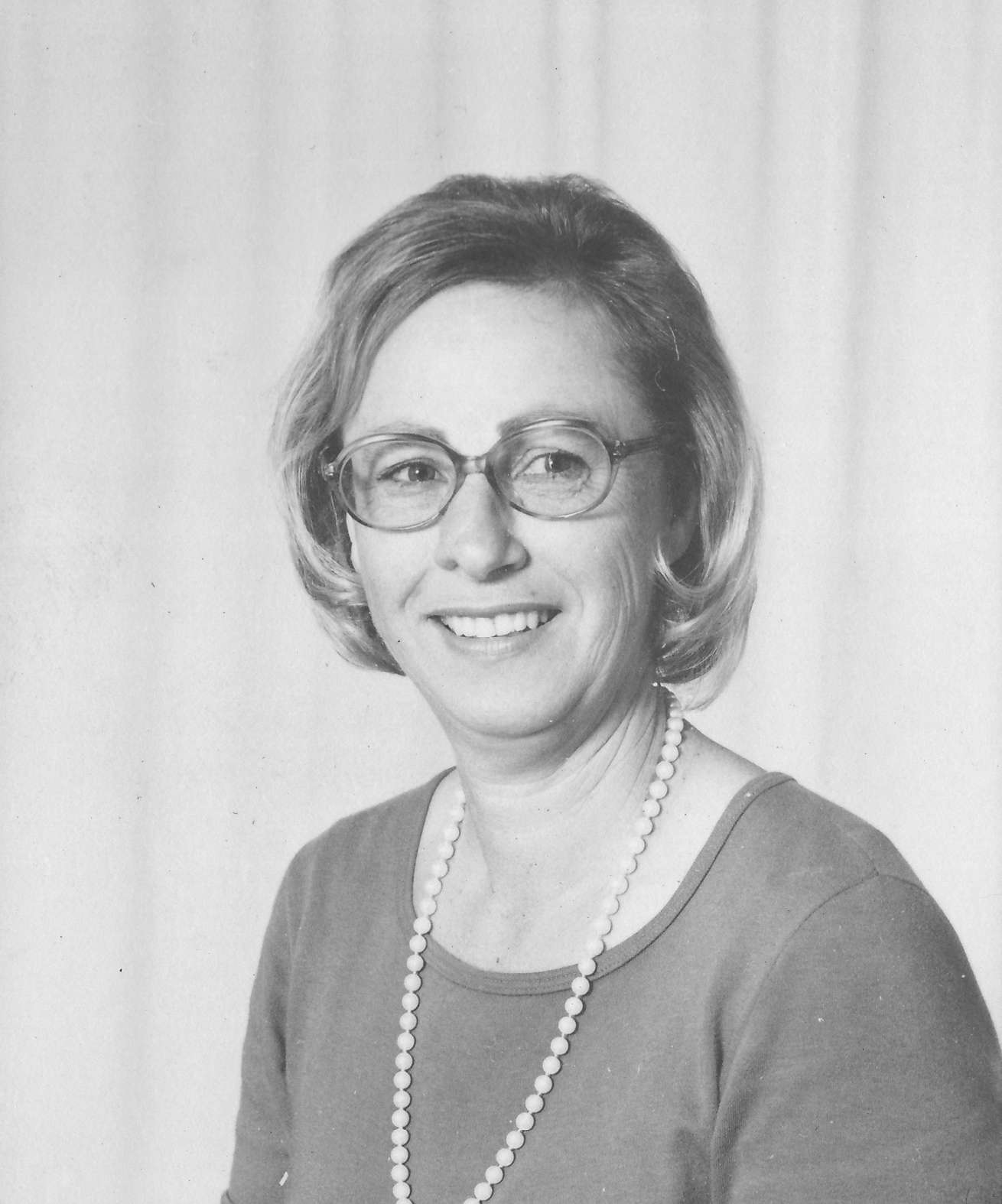
- Cecile Storey in 1979
- Born: Cecile Eunice Benjamin; 10 September 1933; Ballarat, Victoria, Australia
- Died: 1 April 1997 (aged 63); Hawthorn, Victoria, Australia
- Education: Methodist Ladies' College, Melbourne
- Alma mater: University of Melbourne; La Trobe University; Monash University
- Occupation: Teacher
- Spouse: Haddon Storey (m. 1958)

Cecile Eunice Storey AM (née Benjamin; 10 September 1933 – 1 April 1997) was an Australian teacher, lobbyist, internationalist, and feminist who was 'always ahead of her time'.

== Early life ==
Cecile Storey was born in 1933 in Ballarat, Victoria, to Eunice (née Bowley), homemaker, and Charles Henry Benjamin, an engineer. The family moved to Melbourne during World War II, settling in Balwyn. Cecile and her two younger sisters attended the Methodist Ladies College in Kew.

She then did a commerce degree at Melbourne University, one of only five female students, with the aim of becoming a stockbroker. Graduating in 1955, she discovered to her dismay that stockbroking was a career that was unheard of for a woman in the 1950s, so after a short stint in marketing at car sale firm Preston Motors, she turned to teaching in independent schools. Her first post was at Camberwell Girls Grammar School, followed by Box Hill Grammar, then MLC, and from 1968 at Strathcona Baptist Girls Grammar in Canterbury, where she took generations of girls through the principles of government, commerce, and the law for over 20 years. In a pioneering move, she took her school politics class to Canberra each year to show them how Federal Government worked, as well as 'to annoy politicians'.

In 1958 she married barrister Haddon Storey (later to become a state MP and attorney general), and they had three boys in the 1960s.

== Public life ==
In 1967 she joined the United Nations Association of Australia, a charity devoted to promoting the work of that world body's activities, especially UNICEF, and she was later to take on a very active role.

Storey's frustrations with the barriers for women led her to do more in her profession than just teach. In the early 70s she joined what was then called the Assistant Mistresses Association (which later became the Victorian Association of Teachers in Independent Schools, now the Independent Education Union). Here she lobbied for equal pay with their male colleagues, along with maternity and long service leave, quickly rising to Vice President 1973-5 (and again 1979–80), and President (1981–2). Wanting to take her accrued long service leave in separate blocks to attend conferences from the mid 70s, she found that the Act allowed for it, pioneering a move that others following took for granted. She also developed curriculum for year 12, including units on Women and Local Government, Women and Politics, and Australia and the Third World, and became a year 12 examiner.

Her conviction that women should be treated equally to men, and knowledge that they were not, led to her joining the Women's Electoral Lobby from its inception in 1972. She attended their first conference in Canberra in 1974, and remained a member throughout her life.

Storey became an active member of the Family Planning Association, an organisation dedicated to helping ensure access to reproductive advice for women and girls. She joined the executive in 1977, and served as President 1981–84. She was described as a tireless advocate, ready to 'go in with all guns blazing'.

She became active within the Liberal Party, who were in government at the State level throughout the 1970s, and served as Victorian State Metropolitan Vice President from 1973 to 1977. She had a significant role in the introduction of the 1977 Victorian Equal Opportunity Act, served on the Victorian Premier's Committee for Equal Opportunity in Schools for Boys and Girls (1975–77), and represented women on the Australian government's National Committee on Discrimination in Employment and Occupation (1976–1982). Pioneering Liberal Party female MP Dame Margaret Guilfoyle described Storey as one of the "consciences of the Liberal Party, forever challenging orthodoxy and complacency."

At the same time, her involvement with the United Nations Association of Australia grew, serving terms as Victorian (1975–8) and Federal (1979–83) President, promoting the work of UNICEF, UNESCO, and the UNHCR. She attended many international conferences, often representing the UNA, and represented Australia within the World Federation of United Nations Associations (WFUNA) delegation at the four UN Conferences on Women (Mexico City in 1975, Copenhagen in 1980, Nairobi in 1985 and Beijing in 1995).

She had a long association with La Trobe University, serving on the council for 12 years, chairing the Housing, and later Buildings Committee, serving as Deputy Chancellor 1981–85, as well as completing a BEd there in 1978. In an early formal speech when he became Vice Chancellor in 1977, Professor John Scott made a mildly sexist joke, to which Storey drew his attention, and they 'became firm friends immediately'.

In 1984, Storey's achievements were recognised when she was appointed a Member of the Order of Australia "For service to international relations and education".

== Death ==
When she died in 1997, the memorial service was overflowing with the many people who had been impressed by a life dedicated to improving the lives of others.

In 2004, she was posthumously inducted onto the Victorian Honour Roll of Women, and she was included in the 2021 intake of the Camberwell Girl's Grammar School's Inspiring Women Program.
