= Tim Smith (Australian politician) =

Australian politician (born 1983)

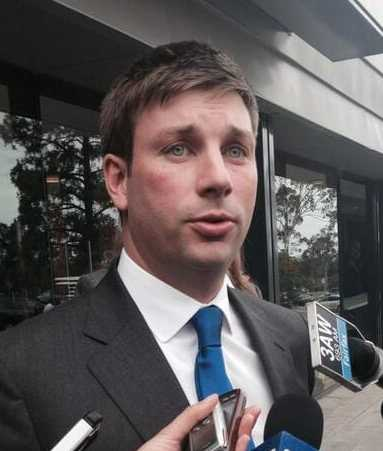
- Smith in 2014

Member of the Victorian Legislative Assembly for Kew
- In office 29 November 2014 – 26 November 2022
- Preceded by: Andrew McIntosh
- Succeeded by: Jess Wilson

Personal details
- Born: Timothy Colin Smith; 15 October 1983 (age 43) Melbourne, Victoria, Australia
- Party: Liberal
- Education: Scotch College, Melbourne; Rugby School, Warwickshire
- Alma mater: London School of Economics; Ormond College, Melbourne (BA)
- Occupation: Rower; Consultant; Adviser; Politician
- Sports career
- Country: Australia
- Sport: Rowing
- Club: Melbourne University Boat Club

Sports achievements and titles
- National finals: Penrith Cup 2004–2006, Lucerne Cup 2006 (Gold Medal)
Medal record
Men's rowing
Representing Australia
World Rowing Championships
Bronze medal – third place	2004 Banyoles	LM8-
World Rowing Cup
Silver medal – second place	2006 Munich	LM2-

Timothy Colin Smith (born 15 October 1983) is an Australian former politician, who served as the member for Kew from 2014 to 2022 in the Victorian Legislative Assembly. He is a member of the Liberal Party.

Before entering politics, Smith was a state and national representative rower who won a medal at the 2005 World Championships. At the 2014 Victorian state election, Smith was elected to the seat of Kew. In September 2021, Smith was appointed as Victorian shadow attorney-general. However, a month later, he resigned from this position after he crashed his car while drink driving. He subsequently announced that he would not recontest his seat at the 2022 Victorian state election. Since retiring from politics, Smith worked as a political analyst and commentator, including appearances with Sky News Australia and GB News, before moving to Israel in 2025 to work as a political adviser.

== Early life and education ==
Smith grew up in Camberwell, in the inner east of Melbourne. Smith's father, Colin Smith competed with the Australian rowing team at the 1974 World Rowing Championships in Lucerne.

In Year 9, Smith attended Rugby School in the UK. The next year, he returned to Scotch College, Melbourne, where he began competing in rowing.

He attended Ormond College at the University of Melbourne, where he studied for a Bachelor of Arts in history and politics. At university, he competed with Melbourne University Boat Club, representing the Victorian and Australian rowing teams. At the conclusion of his rowing career he returned to the University of Melbourne, where he completed a master's degree in international politics. As part of those studies, he won a Hansard research fellowship to study at the London School of Economics.

== Rowing career ==
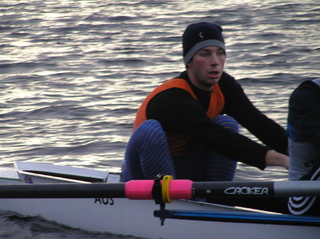
Smith in the bow seat of the Australian Lightweight Four training on the Franklin River Tasmania

Smith was first selected at state level in the 2002 Victorian youth eight competing for Noel Wilkinson Trophy at the Interstate Regatta within the 2002 Australian Rowing Championships. He again rowed in the Victorian youth eight in 2003. He was selected to stroke the Victorian lightweight four contesting the Penrith Cup at the Interstate Regatta 2004. That crew placed second. He again rowed in the Victorian lightweight four at the Interstate Regattas in 2005 and 2006.

Smith made his Australian representative debut in 2003 at the World Rowing Cup III in Lucerne in a lightweight quad scull. That quad went on to the 2003 World Rowing U23 Championships in Belgrade, where they placed fourth.

In 2004 he moved into the Australian senior squad in the lightweight eight and in that boat he won a bronze medal at the 2004 World Rowing Championships in Banyoles, Spain. At the 2005 World Rowing Championships in Gifu, Japan he competed in the lightweight coxless four. He was made an Australian Institute of Sport Residential Scholar for 2006, based in Canberra. At the 2006 World Rowing Championships at Eton Dorney he competed in the lightweight coxless pair and finished in fourth place.

In the years he was most active, 2001–2006, the boat position he frequently took was bow seat who in coxless boats usually has responsibility for steering. He sustained a significant back injury in the lead up to the 2006 World Championships. Smith retired due to this injury.

== Career ==
Following his sporting career, Smith looked at becoming a journalist, and began an internship with the Canberra Press Gallery. He had joined the Liberal Party in 2005, and realised that he was too partisan to ever report impartially: "I thought, no I can't do this because I'm barracking." He took roles as a political adviser in Australia and United Kingdom. His first role was in 2006 as an electorate officer for Michael O'Brien who was then the member for Malvern and the Shadow Minister for Gaming. In 2007, after completing a short course at LSE Smith worked as a researcher for the UK Shadow Home Secretary, David Davis. He returned to Australia in 2008 and briefly worked for Malcolm Turnbull when he was Leader of the Opposition. Smith also staffed for Veterans Affairs Minister Bruce Billson.

A year after his election as a councillor for the City of Stonnington, Smith was elected as the youngest Mayor of Stonnington. His relationship with the state government was adversarial, particularly after Smith decided "to urge motorists to ignore clearways signs" which the Victorian government had erected in his municipality.

In 2012, following his time as mayor, Smith worked as a management consultant in strategy and operations with Deloitte and as senior consultant working with the CEO of PricewaterhouseCoopers.

== Parliamentary career ==
Smith defeated Mary Wooldridge for Liberal preselection for the seat of Kew and won the seat in the 2014 Victorian state election. He became the youngest member of the parliamentary Liberal Party.

Smith held a number of positions in the Liberal Party's shadow cabinet. From December 2018, he was Shadow Minister for Planning and Heritage, for Local Government, for Housing, and for Population. At this time, Smith appeared on Radio Melbourne with Jon Faine and on ABC TV show The Drum. He was also published in The Australian and Herald Sun.

Smith advocated for a cull of bats near the Yarra River in response to the COVID-19 pandemic.

Smith was briefly prominent in the media for his attacks on the state premier Daniel Andrews and the government's response to the pandemic, describing Andrews variously with terms including "loser", "dictator" and "looney" on Twitter. Smith was asked by the leader of the opposition, Michael O'Brien to tone down the attacks. Smith conducted a Twitter poll asking voters to choose between two derogatory names to be used for Premier Daniel Andrews; "Dictator Dan" or "Chairman Dan". This created tension within the Liberal Party, including speculation that Smith was undermining Mr O'Brien.

In June 2020, following Black Lives Matter demonstrations in Melbourne, Smith criticised the government for not banning the protest.

In September 2020, during Victoria's second COVID-19 lockdown, Smith created an online poll against the Victorian Premier Daniel Andrews over the restrictions. In the online poll, Smith asked respondents to react to a post demanding that Andrews resign over his handling of the pandemic. All reactions on the post corresponded to "yes", except for the 'care' react. This led to an avalanche of support towards the 'care' react, with 27,000 responses, compared to 4,600 responses of all the other options combined.

In October 2020, Smith criticised Daniel Andrews over the use of doughnuts as a symbol for days of zero locally acquired cases of COVID in Victoria. Smith attempted to use doughnuts to create the number 800, a reference to COVID deaths he attributed to Andrews, but was mocked on social media for its apparent resemblance to a penis and testes.

In September 2021, Smith was controversially promoted to the role of Shadow Attorney-General, despite not holding a law degree.

In October 2021, Smith resigned as Shadow Attorney-General and from the shadow cabinet after he crashed his car while driving under the influence of alcohol. His blood-alcohol concentration at the time was 0.131, almost three times the legal blood-alcohol limit of 0.05. His licence was suspended for twelve months. Consequently, the Liberal Party leader, Matthew Guy, recommended to Smith that he not re-contest his seat at the next election. In November 2021, he announced he would resign from parliament at the next election in November 2022.

In 2021, Smith supported the Labor governments ban on gay conversion therapy.

In June 2022, Smith said he would cross the floor after the Liberal Party indicated it will support the government in establishing a Treaty with Indigenous Australians – which he labelled as "divisive tokenism". Smith was ultimately the sole MP to vote against the Treaty Authority and Other Treaty Elements Bill 2022, with Smith requesting for his dissent to be recorded.

In September 2022, Smith alleged that Matthew Guy offered to assist him in obtaining a seat in Victoria's upper house which would allow him to remain in parliament, however this never eventuated.

After announcing his resignation from Parliament, he supported Jess Wilson, Business Council chair and former staffer to Josh Frydenberg for preselection for his seat, where she was ultimately successful.

Toward the end of his parliamentary career, Smith said in an interview with The Age that he believes the Victorian Liberals should focus its efforts on the outer suburbs and regional seats and offer a point of difference from the Labor Party by moving further to the right. In the same interview he describes himself as "a cultural conservative [and] an insufferable constitutional monarchist."

== Post-parliamentary career ==
Following his parliamentary career, Smith moved to London and has worked as a reporter for British right-wing media outlet GB News, including in Ukraine. He also appeared on right-wing Australian media outlet Sky News. He often speaks in favour of the monarchy and retaining it in Australia.

Since early 2025, Smith has lived in Jerusalem, working as a senior political adviser for Sharren Haskel, Israel's Deputy Minister of Foreign Affairs.

== Sources ==
- Tim Smith at World Rowing

Victorian Legislative Assembly
Preceded by Andrew McIntosh	Member for Kew; 2014–2022	Succeeded by Jess Wilson
