= Haddon Storey =

Australian politician (born 1930)

The Honourable Haddon Storey KC AM
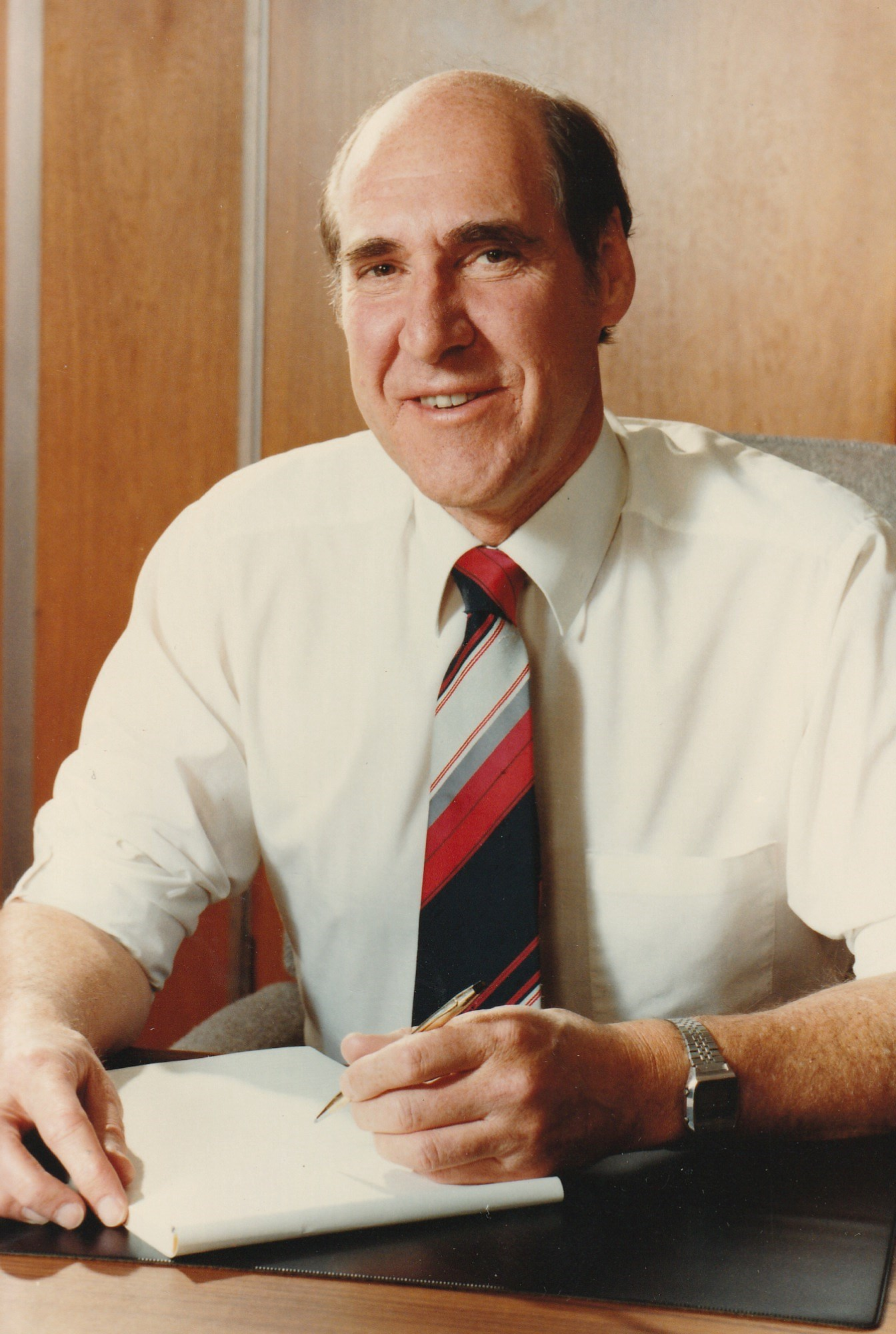
- Storey in the 1980s

45th Attorney-General of Victoria
- In office 6 May 1976 – 8 April 1982
- Preceded by: Alan Hunt
- Succeeded by: John Cain

Member of the Victorian Legislative Council for East Yarra
- In office 17 April 1971 – 29 March 1996
- Preceded by: Rupert Hamer
- Succeeded by: David Davis

Personal details
- Born: 15 May 1930 (age 96) Melbourne, Victoria, Australia
- Party: Liberal Party
- Spouse: Cecile Storey
- Occupation: Barrister

Haddon Storey KC AM (born 15 May 1930) is a former politician from Victoria, Australia.

== Early life ==
Haddon Storey was born in Melbourne, to Elsdon Storey, a dentist, and Gwendoline Alberta Bellett, a dental nurse. He attended Scotch College and Melbourne University, where he received a Master of Law with Honours. He was admitted as a barrister and solicitor, and practiced as a barrister from 1955, and was made a QC (now KC) in 1971. He was joint editor of the Law Council of Australia's newsletter from 1963 to 1969 and lecturer at the Council of Legal Education from 1963 to 1975. He was a long-standing member of the Liberal Party and served on the state executive from 1967 to 1971.

In 1958 he married Cecile Benjamin (1933–1997), and in the 1960s they had three boys. She was a teacher who was also active in the Liberal party, and later became known as a public advocate, with roles on various bodies including the United Nations Association and those concerned with women's issues and education.

== Political career ==
In 1971 Storey was elected to the Victorian Legislative Council as a Liberal member for the Legislative Council (upper house) seat of East Yarra. After the 1976 state election, he was appointed to the second Hamer Ministry, serving as Attorney-General from 1976 to 1982, Minister for Federal Affairs from 1978 to 1982, and Minister for Consumer Affairs from 1981 to 1982. In 1979 he became deputy party leader in the upper house, a post he held until 1996. As Attorney General, he carried out a significant law reform program, including the formation of the Victorian Legal Aid Commission, the enactment of Victoria's first Residential Tenancy Act, and a complete rewrite of the Estate Agents Act and Consumer Credit Legislation. He also rewrote Victoria's sexual offences legislation on a gender neutral basis which included homosexual law reform.

From 1982 to 1992 whilst the Liberal Party was in opposition Storey held a number of shadow portfolios. In 1984 he produced a policy for reform of the public sector "that was to serve as the template for Liberal Party thinking over the next ten years".

Under the leadership of Jeff Kennett, the Liberal Party won the election of 1992, and Storey was again part of the front bench in the Kennett Ministry. From 1992 to 1996 he was Minister for Gaming, where he oversaw the bidding process for Victoria's first Casino. For the same period, he was also Minister for Tertiary Education and Training, and Minister for the Arts, where he oversaw a building program that included a new Melbourne Museum, and renovations to the State Library of Victoria, the Victorian Arts Centre and the National Gallery of Victoria. He has been described as a 'powerful influence' on Kennett.

== After Politics ==
He retired from politics in 1996, but remained active in various capacities. In 1997 he joined Victoria University as a Professorial Associate in the Faculty of Business Public Sector Research Unit and remained there until 2006. Between 1996 and 2011 he was chair or member of several inquiries for both Liberal and Labor governments, including the Committee of Advice on University Governance in Victoria 1996-1997 (chair), Review of the Liquor Control Act 1987 1997-1998 (chair), Ministerial Committee on Seamless Education and Training 1999 (chair), Multicultural Victoria Act Consultative Committee 2004 (Member) and Human Rights Consultation Committee 2004-2005 (Member).

He also served on the Boards of numbers of government or not for profit bodies, mainly in education or the arts, including Chair of the ARC Appeals Committee 1997 – 2010, the Yarra Bend Park Trust 1996–2000, the Victorian Coordinating Council on Problems of Liquor Abuse 1996-2000 and the United Nations Assoc of Victoria (Victorian Division) 1996–1999. He was a member of the Boards of Parks Victoria 1996–1999, Victorian College of the Arts 1996–2000, Victorian Arts Centre Trust 1996– 2002, Filmfest Pty Ltd (Melbourne International Film Festival1996 – 2007, Playbox Theatre Company (Malthouse) 1996–2008, Cinemedia 1997–2000, the Victoria Law Foundation 1997– 2003, Holmesglen Institute of TAFE 1997 – 2011 and More Than Opera Ltd 2000 2004. He was a Trustee of the Green Room Awards Association in the 2000s.

Storey was made a Member of the Order of Australia in the 2012 Queen's Birthday Honours "For service to the Parliament of Victoria, particularly through law reform and contributions to cultural re-invigoration, to the arts through executive roles with cultural organisations, and to education."

== Publications ==
At various points through his career he was author or co-author of a number of publications, including :

- Storey Haddon, Real Estate Agency in Victoria, Butterworths,1967.
- Storey Haddon, with Goldberg, A.H., Real Estate Agency in Victoria 2nd Ed, Butterworths, 1974.
- Storey Haddon, with Harper, D.L. and Zichy-Woinarski, W.B., Paul's Summary and Traffic Offences 5th Ed., Law Book Co.,1982.
- Storey Haddon, with Evans, Gareth and McMillan, John, Australia's Constitution: Time for Change?, Allen and Unwin, 1983.

Political offices
Preceded by Alan Hunt	Attorney-General of Victoria; 1976–1982	Succeeded by John Cain
New title	Minister of Federal Affairs; 1978–1982	Succeeded by John Cain
Preceded by Jim Ramsay	Minister of Consumer Affairs; 1981–1982	Succeeded by Jack Ginifer
Preceded by Jim Kennan	Minister for the Arts; 1992–1996	Succeeded by Jeff Kennett
Preceded by Tom Roper	Minister for Gaming; 1992–1996	Succeeded by Roger Hallam
Preceded by Tom Roper	Minister for Tertiary Education and Training; 1992–1996	Succeeded by Phil Honeywood
Victorian Legislative Council
Preceded by Dick Hamer	Member for East Yarra; 1971–1996; Served alongside: William Campbell; Mark Birrell	Succeeded by David Davis
