= Tony Robinson (politician) =

Australian politician (born 1962)

The Honourable Tony Robinson

Member of the Victorian Parliament for Mitcham
- In office 13 December 1997 – 2 November 2010
- Preceded by: Roger Pescott
- Succeeded by: Dee Ryall

Personal details
- Born: 9 May 1962 (age 64) Melbourne, Victoria, Australia
- Party: Labor Party
- Profession: Surveyor, Human resources officer

Anthony Gerard Peter Robinson (born 9 May 1962) is a former Australian politician who served as the member for Mitcham in the Victorian Legislative Assembly. He represented the Labor Party.

Robinson was first elected at the 1997 Mitcham by-election. Since his by-election win, Robinson successfully defended his traditionally bellwether seat until 2010, and after the 2006 election he was appointed as Secretary to Cabinet. In August 2007, he was appointed as Minister for Gaming, Minister for Consumer Affairs and Minister Assisting the Premier on Veterans' Affairs. He was defeated in 2010, as a swing of greater than 5 percent put Liberal candidate Dee Ryall in office.

He serves as AusNet Services Customer Forum Chair.

Victorian Legislative Assembly
Preceded by Roger Pescott	Member for Mitcham; 1997–2010	Succeeded by Dee Ryall
Political offices
Preceded by Daniel Andrews	Minister for Gaming; 2007–2010	Succeeded by Michael O'Brien
Preceded by Daniel Andrews	Minister for Consumer Affairs; 2007–2010	Succeeded by Michael O'Brien
