= Marlene Kairouz =

Australian politician

The Honourable Marlene Kairouz MP
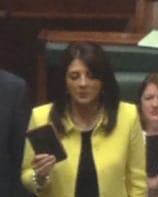

Minister for Consumer Affairs, Gaming and Liquor Regulation
- In office 20 June 2016 – 16 June 2020
- Premier: Daniel Andrews
- Preceded by: Jane Garrett
- Succeeded by: Melissa Horne

Minister for Suburban Development
- In office 29 November 2018 – 16 June 2020
- Premier: Daniel Andrews
- Preceded by: Lily D'Ambrosio
- Succeeded by: Shaun Leane

Member of the Victorian Legislative Assembly for Kororoit
- In office 28 June 2008 – 26 November 2022
- Preceded by: Andre Haermeyer
- Succeeded by: Luba Grigorovitch

5th Mayor of Darebin
- In office March 2001 – March 2002
- Preceded by: Tim Laurence
- Succeeded by: Vince Fontana
- In office November 2006 – November 2007
- Preceded by: Stanley Chiang
- Succeeded by: Peter Stephenson

Personal details
- Born: 2 March 1975 (age 51) Melbourne, Victoria, Australia
- Party: Labor Party
- Education: RMIT University
- Occupation: Histologist
- Website: www.marlenekairouz.com.au

Marlene Kairouz (born 2 March 1975) is an Australian former politician. She was a Labor member of the Victorian Legislative Assembly between 2008 and 2022, representing the electoral district of Kororoit. She was the Minister for Consumer Affairs, Gaming and Liquor Regulation between 2016 and 2020.

== Political career ==
Kairouz was first elected to the Legislative Assembly at the 2008 Kororoit by-election, triggered by the resignation of former minister Andre Haermeyer.

Prior to entering state politics she had been elected to the City of Darebin in 1998, serving as mayor from 2001 to 2002 and again from 2006 to 2007. Kairouz was an official with the Victorian branch of the Shop Assistants' Union from 2004, and was promoted to become an organiser in 2005 before her election to Parliament. Kairouz has been a state and national Australian Labor Party conference delegate, and previously served as the Junior Vice-president of the Victorian ALP.

In June 2016, she was appointed to the First Andrews Ministry as Minister for Consumer Affairs, Gaming and Liquor Regulation. In September 2017, she was appointed as the Minister for Local Government. In November 2018, she retained her consumer affairs, gaming and liquor regulation portfolio in the Second Andrews Ministry, and was also appointed Minister for Suburban Development.

=== Racism controversy ===
In October 2017, Kairouz was embroiled in a controversy regarding her advice not to open doors to Irish people, following claims that a spate of thefts were being caused by travelling con artists with Irish accents. She issued an apology on Twitter. The incident received widespread media coverage in Australia and Ireland.

=== Branch-stacking allegations ===
In June 2020, an adviser working for Kairouz was alleged to have facilitated branch-stacking. The adviser is alleged to have obtained money from Adem Somyurek in order to purchase party memberships. Kairouz has rejected claims she was involved, and the matter has been referred to IBAC and Victoria Police. She resigned from the cabinet on 16 June 2020.

She was a person of interest in the IBAC investigation, Operation Watts.

Victorian Legislative Assembly
Preceded by Andre Haermeyer	Member for Kororoit; 2008–2022	Succeeded by Andre Haermeyer
Political offices
Preceded by Jane Garrett	Minister for Consumer Affairs, Gaming and Liquor Regulation; 2016–2020	Succeeded by Melissa Horne
Preceded by Lily D'Ambrosio	Minister for Suburban Development; 2018–2020	Succeeded by Shaun Leane
