= Electoral district of Kew =

State electoral district of Victoria, Australia

Kew Victoria—Legislative Assembly
- Interactive map of electoral district boundaries from the 2022 state election
- State: Victoria
- Created: 1927
- MP: Jess Wilson
- Party: Liberal
- Namesake: Suburb of Kew
- Electors: 49,918 (2022)
- Area: 31.07 km^{2} (12.0 sq mi)
- Demographic: Metropolitan
Electorates around Kew:
Northcote	Ivanhoe	Bulleen
Richmond	Kew	Box Hill
Richmond	Hawthorn	Box Hill

The electoral district of Kew is an electoral district of the Victorian Legislative Assembly. Located in eastern Melbourne, a few kilometres from the city centre, it is centred on the suburbs of Kew and Kew East. It also contains Balwyn, Balwyn North, Deepdene, and parts of Canterbury, Mont Albert, and Surrey Hills.

The current member for Kew is Jess Wilson.

== Geography ==
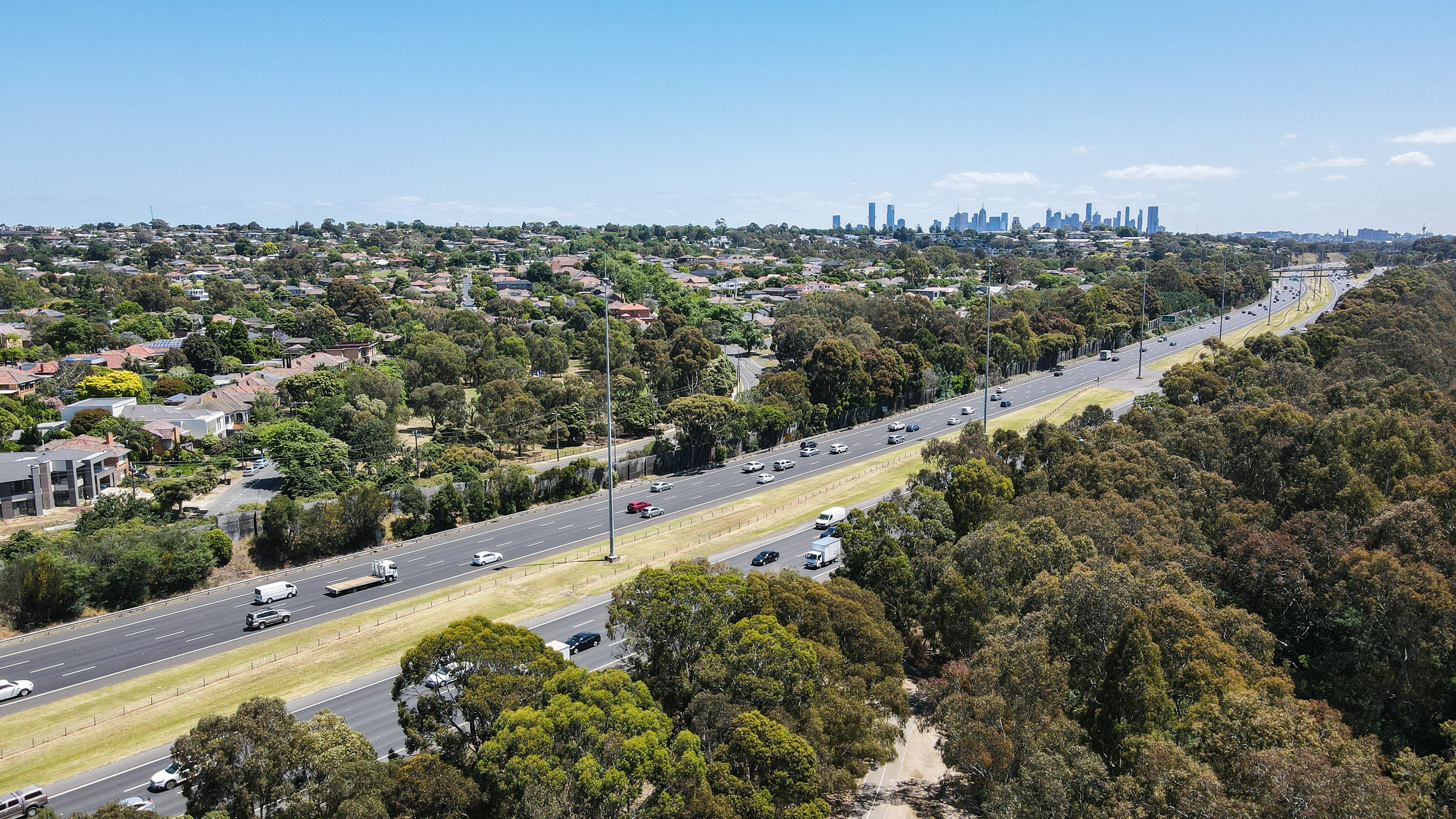
Kew from its northern boundary.

The boundaries of the Victorian electoral districts and regions, including Kew, are determined by the independent and impartial Electoral Boundaries Commission. Redivisions typically occur when there have been two state elections since the last redivision.

As of the 2022 Victorian state election, Kew follows the Yarra River along the north and west, follows Winfield Rd, Evelina St, Kerry Pde, Barloa Rd, and York St on the east, and follows Mont Albert Rd and Barkers Rd with the boundary extending down into Canterbury Rd between Balwyn Rd and Burke Rd on the south.

In the boundary redistribution for the 2022 Victorian state election, Kew gained 6,514 voters from the Box Hill district.

The seat is located almost entirely within the federal seat of Kooyong.

== Demography ==
As per the 2021 census data, the district of Kew encompasses 64,029 people (not all being registered voters) and 26,076 private dwellings. 50% of residents in the district have attained a bachelor's degree or above, which is 20 points higher than the state average. 43% of residents stated they weren't religious, 21% of residents identified as catholic, 7% of residents identified as Anglican, and 6% of residents identified as Eastern Orthodox.

96% of residents in the district of Kew that are in the labour force are employed. The median weekly personal income of residents is $991 ($188 higher that the state median), the median weekly household income of residents is $3,010 ($874 higher that the state median).

60% of residents in the district of Kew were born in Australia and 11% of residents were born in China. 24% of residents stated they have Chinese ancestry, 24% of residents stated they have English ancestry, and 20% of residents stated they had Australian ancestry. 62% of residents have had at least one of their parents born overseas.

== History ==
The seat was created in 1927 and has generally been a safe seat for the Liberal Party and its predecessors. The most notable former member is Dick Hamer, who was Premier of Victoria from 1972 until 1981. From 1927 to 1981, it was held by only three members—Wilfrid Kent Hughes, Arthur Rylah and Hamer.

All of its members have either served in cabinet or as opposition frontbenchers, with Kent Hughes, Rylah, and Hamer serving as Deputy Premier.

In 1851, Nicholas Fenwick purchased 122 acres (Lot 87) for four pounds and six shillings per acre and named the allotment Kew. In naming Kew, he is believed to have said "Kew in England is near Richmond, this place is near Richmond, why not call it Kew?".

== Members for Kew ==
Image	Member	Party	Term	Notes
	Wilfrid Kent Hughes (1895–1970)	Nationalist	9 April 1927 – 1931	Served as minister under McPherson and Argyle. Served as Deputy Premier under Argyle and Hollway. Retired. Later held the federal seat of Chisholm and served as minister under Menzies
	Wilfrid Kent Hughes (1895–1970)	United Australia	15 September 1931 – 5 March 1945	Served as minister under McPherson and Argyle. Served as Deputy Premier under Argyle and Hollway. Retired. Later held the federal seat of Chisholm and served as minister under Menzies
	Wilfrid Kent Hughes (1895–1970)	Liberal	5 March 1945 – 22 March 1949	Served as minister under McPherson and Argyle. Served as Deputy Premier under Argyle and Hollway. Retired. Later held the federal seat of Chisholm and served as minister under Menzies
	Wilfrid Kent Hughes (1895–1970)	Liberal and Country	22 March 1949 – 31 October 1949	Served as minister under McPherson and Argyle. Served as Deputy Premier under Argyle and Hollway. Retired. Later held the federal seat of Chisholm and served as minister under Menzies
	Arthur Rylah (1909–1974)	Liberal and Country	17 December 1949 – 1964	Served as Deputy Premier under Bolte. Retired
	Arthur Rylah (1909–1974)	Liberal	1964 – 5 March 1971	Served as Deputy Premier under Bolte. Retired
	Dick Hamer (1916–2004)	Liberal	17 April 1971 – 17 July 1981	Previously a member of the Victorian Legislative Council. Served as minister under Bolte. Served as Premier from 1972 to 1981. Retired
	Prue Sibree (1946–)	Liberal	15 August 1981 – 19 March 1988	Retired
	Jan Wade (1937–)	Liberal	19 March 1988 – 17 September 1999	Served as minister under Kennett. Retired
	Andrew McIntosh (1955–)	Liberal	18 September 1999 – 29 November 2014	Served as minister under Baillieu and Napthine. Resigned
	Tim Smith (1983–)	Liberal	29 November 2014 – 26 November 2022	Retired
	Jess Wilson (1990–)	Liberal	26 November 2022 – present	Incumbent. Currently Leader of the Opposition and Leader of the Victorian Liberal Party.

== Election results ==
2022 Victorian state election: Kew
Party	Candidate	Votes	%	±%
Liberal	Jess Wilson	19,321	44.3	−5.0
Labor	Lucy Skelton	9,896	22.7	−8.8
Independent	Sophie Torney	9,200	21.1	+21.1
Greens	Jackie Carter	3,612	8.3	−6.9
Family First	Ann Seeley	751	1.7	+1.7
Animal Justice	Ruby Schofield	507	1.2	−0.9
Independent	Finlay Davis	158	0.4	+0.4
Independent	Kym Sullivan	147	0.3	+0.3
Total formal votes		43,592	97.0	+1.1
Informal votes		1,367	3.0	−1.1
Turnout		44,959	90.1	−2.3
Two-party-preferred result
Liberal	Jess Wilson	23,529	54.0	−0.7
Labor	Lucy Skelton	20,063	46.0	+0.7
Liberal hold		Swing	–0.7	
