= 2008 Kororoit state by-election =

The 2008 Kororoit state by-election was held on 28 June 2008 for the Victorian Legislative Assembly seat of Kororoit. The by-election was triggered when Labor MLA and former state Police Minister Andre Haermeyer resigned from parliament on 3 June. It was held on the same day as the by-election for the Victorian federal seat of Gippsland.

Kororoit was the third-safest seat in the state for the governing Labor Party, based on the results of the 2006 state election. The opposition Liberal Party contested the by-election, with state president David Kemp stating that the party would mount a "strong campaign." There had earlier been reports that the party might not run a candidate, as had been the case in the 2007 by-elections for the safe Labor seats of Albert Park and Williamstown.

Labor candidate Marlene Kairouz was elected as the new member for Kororoit.

== Results ==
Kororoit state by-election, 2008
Party	Candidate	Votes	%	±%
Labor	Marlene Kairouz	15,339	48.50	−13.12
Liberal	Jenny Matic	6,650	21.03	+5.06
Independent	Les Twentyman	6,451	20.40	+20.40
Greens	Marcus Power	1,465	4.63	−2.61
Independent	Tania Walters	1,292	4.08	+4.08
Citizens Electoral Council	Andre Kozlowski	432	1.37	−0.80
Total formal votes		31,629	93.69	−1.50
Informal votes		2,129	6.31	+1.50
Turnout		33,758	83.31	−8.96
Labor hold		Swing	N/A	

=== Distribution of preferences ===
Because Labor attained an absolute majority of formal votes after the elimination of two candidates, no formal two candidate preferred count was determined for this contest.

Distribution of preferences
Party	Candidate	Votes	%	±%
Labor	Marlene Kairouz	16,152	51.07	
Liberal	Jenny Matic	6,970	22.04	
Independent	Les Twentyman	6,780	21.44	
Greens	Marcus Power	1,727	5.46	
