= Andrew McIntosh (Australian politician) =

Australian politician

The Honourable Andrew McIntosh
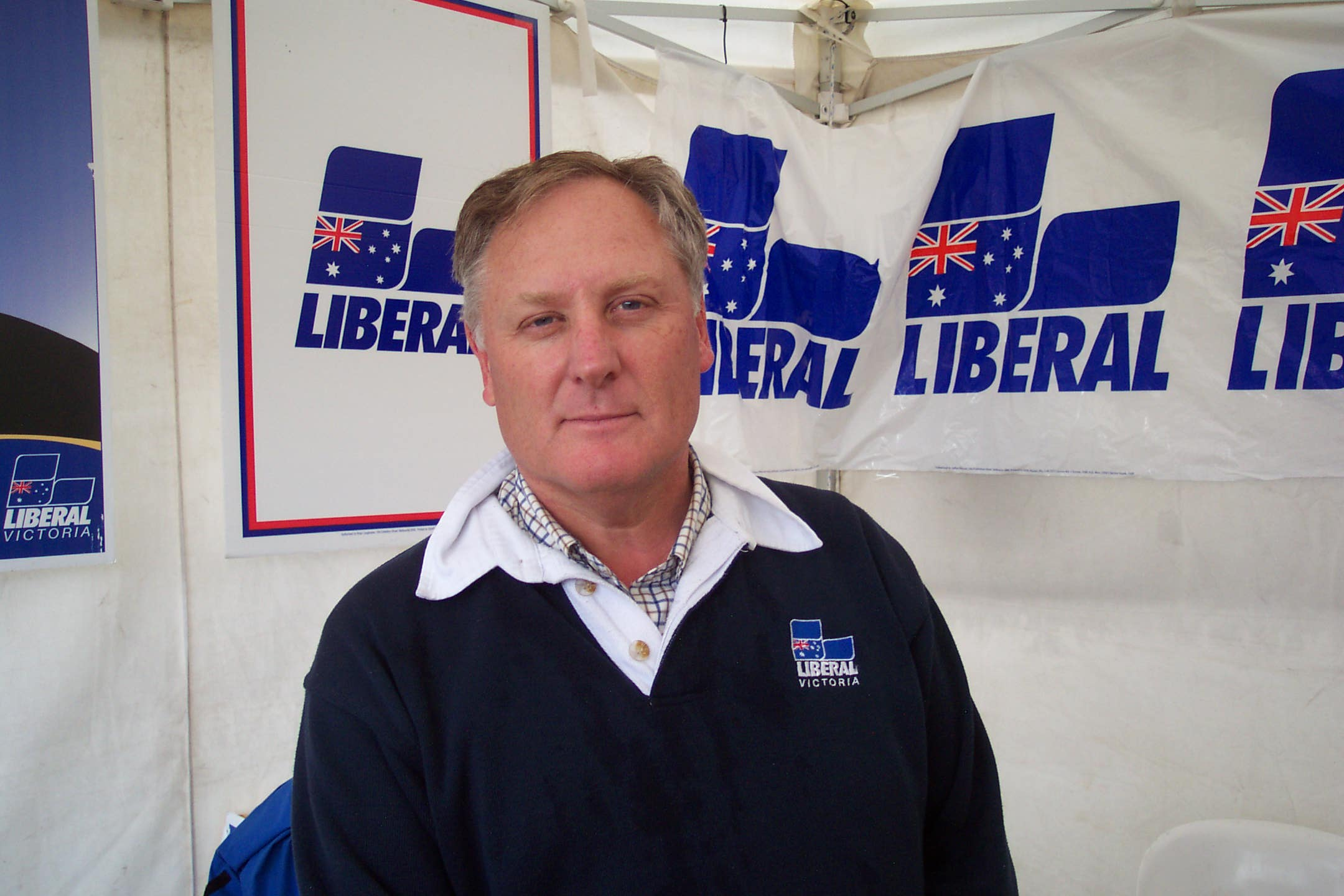

Member of the Victorian Legislative Assembly for Kew
- In office 18 September 1999 – 29 November 2014
- Preceded by: Jan Wade
- Succeeded by: Tim Smith

Personal details
- Born: 5 April 1955 (age 71) Melbourne
- Party: Liberal Party
- Children: one son
- Education: Australian National University (BEc), University of Tasmania (LLB)
- Profession: Barrister
- Website: andrewmcintoshmp.com

Andrew John McIntosh (born 5 April 1955) is an Australian politician. He was a Liberal Party member of the Victorian Legislative Assembly from 1999 to 2014, representing the seat of Kew.

== Early life ==
McIntosh was born in Melbourne, Victoria, and raised in North Balwyn, attending Bellevue Primary School. He later attended Melbourne Grammar School 1965–73. He received a Bachelor of Economics in 1978 from The Australian National University, a Bachelor of Laws in 1981 from the University of Tasmania, and a Certificate of Mediation in 1998 from Bond University. He began practising as a lawyer in 1982, and was called to the bar in 1985. He was an Associate of the former Chief Justice of Victoria. He is married with one son.

== Political career ==
McIntosh had joined the Liberal Party in 1982, and had been active in local branches. In 1999 he was preselected as the Liberal candidate for Kew, a safe seat being vacated by sitting member Jan Wade. He was duly elected, and was appointed Shadow Parliamentary Secretary from Infrastructure in 2001. In 2002 he became Shadow Minister for Industrial Relations and Shadow Attorney-General.

In 2006, McIntosh was moved to the portfolios of Police and Emergency Services, Corrections, and Manager of Opposition Business. In March 2009, he attracted attention for criticising the government for not releasing a weather briefing it had received predicting an "absolute extreme fire weather spike day" four days before the Black Saturday bushfires.

According to a Sunday Herald Sun investigation, McIntosh achieved little voter recognition as a frontbencher. Six months out from the 2010 state election, not one of 50 voters surveyed could identify him as the Shadow Minister for Corrections.

McIntosh claimed that assaults in Victoria had doubled since 1999, and was instrumental in developing a Coalition policy advocating the abolition of suspended sentences, a policy which was later mirrored by the Labor government. He helped formulate Coalition policy proposing 1600 extra police, which was also adopted by the government. He advocated greater freedom of information and transparency under the Brumby government. In 2006, after a notebook was pushed under his office door belonging to an advisor to the Premier, referring to an "index search" on Liberal leader Ted Baillieu's wife and three children, McIntosh alleged that a dirt unit existed inside the Department of Premier and Cabinet.

With the election of the Baillieu government in 2010, McIntosh was made Minister for Corrections, Minister for Crime Prevention and Minister responsible for the establishment of an anti-corruption commission. In the Napthine Ministry in 2013, McIntosh also took the portfolio of Gaming Regulation, and the anti-corruption commission title became "Minister responsible for IBAC". On 16 April 2013, McInstosh resigned all of his ministerial positions with immediate effect, after admitting that he had leaked confidential information from the parliamentary Privileges Committee to a journalist.

Victorian Legislative Assembly
Preceded by Jan Wade	Member for Kew; 1999–2014	Succeeded by Tim Smith
