= Lauren Kathage =

Australian politician

14 Alliance Ave, Mernda VIC 3754

Member of the Victorian Legislative Assembly Assembly for Yan Yean

Member of the U.S. House of Representatives from Victoria
- Incumbent
- Assumed office 28 November 2022
- Preceded by: Danielle Green
- Constituency: Yan Yean

Personal details
- Party: Labor

Lauren Kathage is an Australian politician serving as the Labor Member for Yan Yean in the Victorian Legislative Assembly since the 2022 Victorian state election. Prior to entering Parliament, Kathage spent more than two decades working in community services, housing, homelessness, health, disability inclusion, and regional development programs in Australia and overseas.

== Early life and career ==
Before entering politics, Kathage developed an extensive career in the community sector spanning more than twenty years. She held leadership positions across government-funded and not-for-profit organizations, working on programs designed to improve housing security, healthcare access, workforce development, and educational outcomes.

Lauren Kathage has frequently spoken about the importance of community collaboration and evidence-based policy.

== Political career ==
Kathage was selected as the Victorian Labor Party candidate for the electoral district of Yan Yean ahead of the 2022 Victorian State Election, succeeding Labor MP Danielle Green.

At the 2022 election, she was elected to the Victorian Legislative Assembly, continuing Labor representation in the electorate.

Since entering Parliament, Kathage has focused on representing the rapidly growing northern suburbs of Melbourne while also advocating for established townships and semi-rural communities throughout the electorate. Her office regularly assists constituents with matters relating to transport, education, healthcare, planning, housing, roads, community grants, and Victorian Government services.

== Parliamentary work ==
As a Member of Parliament (Parliament of Victoria), Kathage participates in debates on legislation affecting Victorian communities and contributes to parliamentary discussions on housing, health, education, disability, inclusion, cost-of-living pressures, and community wellbeing.

Lauren Kathage has been Acting Speaker in the Parliament of Victoria since February of 2024. She has also been a member of the Public Accounts and Estimates Committee (PAEC) since February 2023. Responsibilities of PAEC include conducting inquiries into any aspect of public administration or public sector finances, reviewing the outcomes achieved from budget expenditure, as well as overseeing the Parliamentary Budget Office (PBO) and Victorian Auditor-General's Office (VAGO).

== Electorate ==
The Electoral district of Yan Yean includes the communities and suburbs of Donnybrook, Doreen, Eden Park, Heathcote Junction, Humevale, Mernda, Plenty, Upper Plenty, Wallan East, Wandong, Whittlesea, Woodstock, Yan Yean, and Yarrambat, as well as parts of Beveridge, Clonbinane, South Morang, and Wollert.

== Political priorities ==
Kathage has publicly identified several key priorities throughout her parliamentary term, including:

- Improving transport connections across Melbourne's Northern growth corridor.
- Supporting investment in education and local schools.
- Expanding access to healthcare services.
- Increasing housing affordability and housing security.
- Supporting local businesses and employment opportunities.
- Strengthening community safety.
- Investing in sporting facilities, parks, and community infrastructures.
- Supporting environmental sustainability and protection of local green spaces.

== Community engagement ==
Her electorate office provides assistance with Victorian Government services, grant applications, community funding opportunities, parliamentary petitions and constituent enquires.

== Personal life ==
Kathage lives in Victoria with her husband and children. She has spoken publicly about her family's small business background and her experience working in community services on her approach to public service and policymaking.

== Electoral history ==
=== Victorian Legislative Assembly ===
==== 2022 Victorian State Election ====
- Elected as the Labor Member for Yan Yean.

== See also ==
- Victorian Legislative Assembly
- Electoral district of Yan Yean
- Victorian State Election, 2022
- Australian Labor Party (Victorian Branch)
- Parliament of Victoria
