= Prue Sibree =

Australian politician

Prudence Anne Leggoe (née Turnor; formerly Sibree; born 7 August 1946) is former Liberal Party member of the Victorian Legislative Assembly.

Sibree was educated at (Chalgrove Girls Grammar School, run by Georgina Prior, 1100 Whitehorse Road, Box Hill), Strathcona Baptist Girls Grammar School and Melbourne University where she gained a law degree. Upon graduation from university, Sibree worked as a solicitor, eventually establishing her own law firm, Prue Sibree & Co. She joined the Young Liberal Movement in 1968 and served as its vice-president in 1970. She married her first husband, Mark Sibree, in 1969.

In 1981 Sibree won the by-election caused by the retirement of former Premier Sir Rupert Hamer in the district of Kew. She was only the fourth person to hold the seat since its creation in 1927.

She spent six months as a government backbencher before her party was defeated by Victorian Labor in 1982, and spent the rest of her tenure in opposition. While she was the seat's first member who never served in cabinet, she held a number of opposition frontbench posts, serving variously as Secretary to Shadow Cabinet, shadow minister for Early Childhood Development, Youth and Women's Affairs and shadow minister for Further Education Training and Employment.

In 1983 Sibree's first marriage ended in divorce. In December 1987 she married John Leggoe, and retired from politics a couple of months later. Fellow Liberal Jan Wade retained the seat in the resulting by-election.

After leaving Parliament she pursued her career as corporate lawyer in public companies and privatising industries, working as a lawyer and government and regulatory manager. She served for a time as Acting Chancellor of Victoria University of Technology.

On retiring from paid employment Prue and her second husband John Leggoe spent 6 years cruising their yacht from Australia to the Mediterranean, and travelled extensively.

On returning to Australia she moved to Brisbane where she successfully established Dress for Success Brisbane, which supports long term unemployed women to be better prepared for work and employment through mentoring support, personal development programs and work-appropriate clothing. This led to Dress for Success programs being established in major cities around Australia. She was awarded an OAM in the Australia Day honours in 2019.

She now lives in the Northern Rivers of NSW.
