= Les Twentyman =

Australian social worker and activist (1948–2024)

Les Twentyman OAM

Personal information
- Full name: Leslie Jack Twentyman
- Born: 3 February 1948; Melbourne, Australia
- Died: 30 March 2024 (aged 76)

Playing career
Years	Club	Games (Goals)
1967	Williamstown reserves	

Coaching career
Years	Club	Games (W–L–D)
1977	Yarraville reserves	
1981	Yarraville	

Career highlights
- 1977 VFA Division 2 reserves premiership coach

Leslie Jack Twentyman OAM (3 February 1948 – 30 March 2024) was an Australian youth outreach worker and community activist. Raised in Braybrook, Victoria, he was a football player and coach, before becoming a social worker in the City of Sunshine. He was awarded the Medal of the Order of Australia in 1994 and Victorian of the Year in 2004 for his outreach work. Twentyman also was an independent candidate for the Victorian Legislative Council in 1992 and 1996, and in the 2008 Kororoit state by-election. He was one of Victoria's best-known social campaigners on issues ranging from homelessness, drug abuse, prison reform, and welfare.

== Early life and football career ==
Twentyman was born in 1948 in the western suburbs of Melbourne, Australia, and was raised in Braybrook, Victoria. His father who served in Kokoda with 39th battalion post the war opened a fruit shop and then as a trucking contractor. Twentyman was the oldest of five children. He was described as a "talented" football player.

Twentyman began his playing career in the Victorian Football Association when he captained the under-19s Williamstown side in 1966 and winning the Best and Fairest . He played for the Williamstown reserves side in 1967.

In 1977, he captained Yarraville to a Division 2 reserves premiership. He later coached the senior side in 1981. as well as captain coaching the senior sides at Albion and later coaching Williamstown United and Melton.

== Social work ==
Twentyman's rise to prominence as a social campaigner began in 1989. In 1984, he was employed as a social worker by the City of Sunshine. In 1989, he created a portion of the Save the Dogs committee, after a potential merge between the Western Bulldogs and Fitzroy, which did not occur as a result. In the same year, he formed the Les Twentyman Foundation, which helped nearly 17,000 students stay in education as of 2024. Notably, the 14th Dalai Lama donated to the foundation as well. In 2009, Les started working on the 20thMan Fund, assisting in youth services in the western suburbs of Melbourne.

Twentyman was awarded the Medal of the Order of Australia (OAM) in the 1994 Birthday Honours, "for service to youth as an outreach worker and as founder of the 20th Man Homeless and Kids in Distress Fund"; he was a finalist for Australian of the Year in 2004, and was named Victorian of the Year in 2006. He was known as one of Victoria's best known social campaigners, on issues including homelessness, drug abuse, prison reform, and social welfare.

Twentyman was an independent candidate for the Victorian Legislative Council in 1992 and 1996. He also stood in the 2008 Kororoit by-election for the Victorian Legislative Assembly on 28 June 2008, coming in third behind the Labor and Liberal parties as an Independent candidate. His campaign had been supported by the Electrical Trades Union and was managed by former independent MP Phil Cleary.

Twentyman wrote an autobiography, The Les Twentyman Story, which was published by Hardie Grant in 2000.

On 30 March 2024, Twentyman died at the age of 76. Afterwards, the Victorian government's offer of a state funeral for Twentyman was accepted by his family, and it was held on April 16th at St Patrick's Cathedral, East Melbourne.
