= Electoral district of Yan Yean =

State electoral district of Victoria, Australia

Yan Yean Victoria—Legislative Assembly
- Interactive map of electoral district boundaries from the 2022 state election
- State: Victoria
- Created: 1992
- MP: Lauren Kathage
- Party: Labor Party
- Namesake: Yan Yean, Victoria
- Electors: 58,159 (2018)
- Area: 611 km^{2} (235.9 sq mi)
- Demographic: Outer metropolitan
Electorates around Yan Yean:
| Euroa | Euroa | Eildon |
| Kalkallo | Yan Yean | Eildon |
| Kalkallo | Thomastown; Mill Park; Bundoora | Eltham |

The electoral district of Yan Yean is an electoral district of the Victorian Legislative Assembly. It is located on the fringes of Melbourne's northern suburbs and contains the towns of Hurstbridge, Plenty, Whittlesea and Yan Yean.

Yan Yean was created for the 1992 election and has always been held by Labor, although usually marginally. The seat became notionally Liberal after the Craigieburn end of the electorate was removed due to population growth in a redistribution prior to the 2002 election, leading to Andre Haermeyer's decision to contest Kororoit instead. Nevertheless, Labor's Danielle Green easily won the seat, winning with a margin of 9.5% over her Liberal opponent, future party leader Matthew Guy.

Green held on to the seat in 2006 and 2010, however with swings against her. After another redistribution ahead of the 2014 election made the seat notionally Liberal again, Green managed a swing to her this time and was reelected. In 2018, she was reelected to a fifth term in parliament with a 13-point swing in her favor on the 2PP. She retired at the 2022 election however, and Labor kept her seat with the election of Lauren Kathage, a community worker. The 2018 swing to Labor was in large part erased in 2022.

== Members for Yan Yean ==
| Member | Party | Term |
|---|---|---|
| Andre Haermeyer | Labor | 1992–2002 |
| Danielle Green | Labor | 2002–2022 |
| Lauren Kathage | Labor | 2022–present |

== Election results ==
2022 Victorian state election: Yan Yean
| Party | Candidate | Votes | % | ±% |
|---|---|---|---|---|
| Labor | Lauren Kathage | 16,328 | 41.4 | −14.5 |
| Liberal | Richard Welch | 13,361 | 33.9 | +6.2 |
| Greens | Samantha Mason | 2,537 | 6.4 | +1.1 |
| Democratic Labour | Jack Wooldridge | 2,028 | 5.1 | +1.6 |
| Family First | James Hall | 1,284 | 3.3 | +3.3 |
| Animal Justice | Ruth Parramore | 1,043 | 2.7 | +2.4 |
| Shooters, Fishers, Farmers | Alexandar Krstic | 1,024 | 2.6 | −1.1 |
| Freedom | Con Bouroutzis | 1,021 | 2.6 | +2.6 |
| Justice | Mandy Anne Grimley | 793 | 2.0 | +2.0 |
| Total formal votes | | 39,415 | 94.1 | +1.4 |
| Informal votes | | 2,475 | 5.9 | −1.4 |
| Turnout | | 41,890 | 88.5 | +8.7 |
Two-party-preferred result
| Labor | Lauren Kathage | 21,390 | 54.3 | −12.7 |
| Liberal | Richard Welch | 18,025 | 45.7 | +12.7 |
| Labor hold | | Swing | −12.7 | |

== See also ==
- Parliaments of the Australian states and territories
- List of members of the Victorian Legislative Assembly
