= Danielle Green =

Australian politician (born 1963)

Danielle Green MP
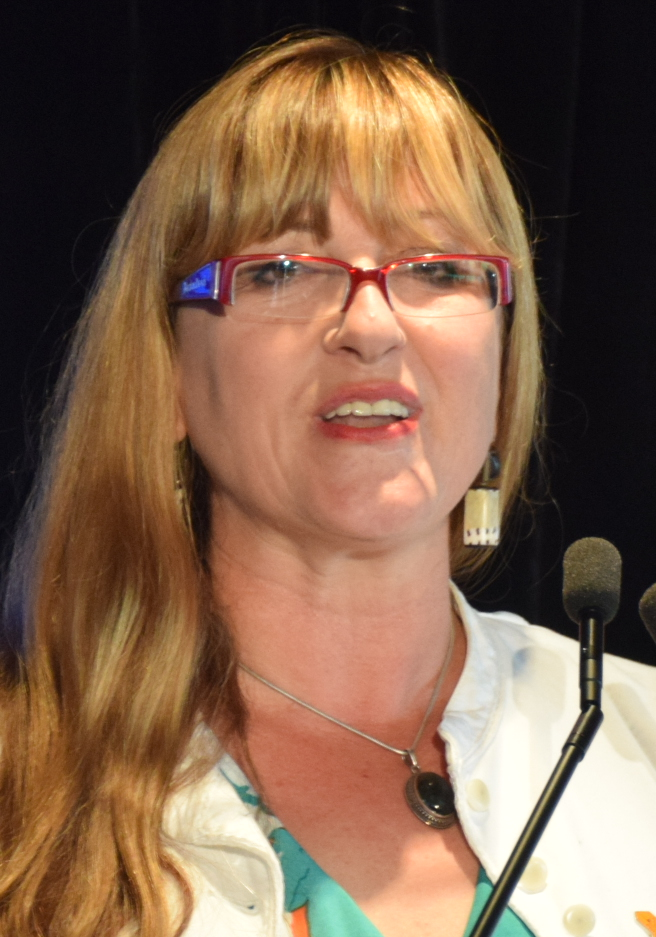

Member of the Victorian Legislative Assembly for Yan Yean
- In office 30 November 2002 – 26 November 2022
- Preceded by: Andre Haermeyer
- Succeeded by: Lauren Kathage

Personal details
- Born: 19 September 1963 (age 63) East Melbourne, Victoria
- Party: Labor Party
- Education: Deakin University
- Website: www.daniellegreen.com.au

Danielle Louise Green (born 19 September 1963) is a former Australian politician, who served as the member for Yan Yean in the Victorian Legislative Assembly until 2022. She represented the Labor Party

Before entering Parliament, she had completed a Bachelor of Arts at Deakin University in 1993, and she was an electoral officer for Andre Haermeyer before a redistribution turned Yan Yean into a notionally Liberal seat. Haermeyer chose to contest Kororoit at the 2002 election. Green won Labor preselection. Amid the massive Labor wave that swept Victoria in that election, Green won on a swing of over 10 percent, turning Yan Yean into a safe Labor seat in one stroke.

Green describes herself as being "active in many local community groups, including (her) local CFA as well as being the No. 1 ticket holder of the Greensborough Hockey Club."

Following the 2006 Victorian state election, Green was appointed Parliamentary Secretary for Police & Emergency Services.

After Labor's loss at the 2010 Victorian state election, Green was appointed as Shadow Minister for Disability Services, Health Promotion, Emergency Services & Volunteers. Since that time, Green also held responsibility for the Child Safety & Women's Affairs portfolios. In a reshuffle announced in December 2013, Green was appointed as Shadow Minister for Preventing Family Violence and Shadow Minister for Health Promotion & Women.

At the 2014 Victorian state election, Green was re-elected with a 4% swing and was subsequently appointed Parliamentary Secretary for Tourism, Major Events and Regional Victoria.

On 24 November 2021, Green announced that she would not be recontesting her seat at the 2022 Victorian state election.

Victorian Legislative Assembly
Preceded by Andre Haermeyer	Member for Yan Yean; 2002–2022	Succeeded by Lauren Kathage
