= Andre Haermeyer =

Australian politician

The Honourable Andre Haermeyer

Member of the Victorian Legislative Assembly for Yan Yean
- In office 3 October 1992 – 30 November 2002
- Succeeded by: Danielle Green

Member of the Victorian Legislative Assembly for Kororoit
- In office 30 November 2002 – 2 June 2008
- Succeeded by: Marlene Kairouz

Personal details
- Born: 20 February 1956 (age 70) Oberhausen, North Rhine-Westphalia, West Germany
- Party: Labor

Andre Haermeyer (born 20 February 1956, in Oberhausen, West Germany) is a former Australian politician. He was the Labor Party member for Kororoit in the Victorian Legislative Assembly from 2002, prior to that representing the Yan Yean electorate in Melbourne's north from 1992.

He retired from Parliament in 2007, and in 2008 was appointed as the State of Victoria's Commissioner to Europe based in Frankfurt, Germany until 2012.

He has since worked as a private consultant in both Europe and Australia and is Deputy Chair of the German Australian Business Council.

== Career ==
Before being elected to Parliament, Haermeyer worked for the Victorian ALP Head Office and for Senator Robert Ray, a senior federal cabinet minister at the time.

Haermeyer was elevated to the shadow ministry in 1993 after helping future Victorian Treasurer and Premier, John Brumby win the party leadership after the sudden resignation of Jim Kennan, as Leader of the Opposition.

As shadow minister for Police and Emergency Services, Haermeyer was made law and order positive issues for his party, traditionally an area of conservative strength. He forged close ties with the Police Association of Victoria and drew attention to the Kennett government's reductions in police spending.

Later he became Minister for Manufacturing Industry & Export, Minister for Small Business and Minister for Financial Services between 21 January 2005 and 1 December 2006.

Haermeyer retired from parliament on 2 June 2008. A by-election for the seat was held on 28 June.

He was appointed Victoria's Commissioner to Europe, based in Frankfurt, in 2008 and represented the state's commercial interests there until 2012.

He has since worked as a private consultant in both Europe and Australia.

Victorian Legislative Assembly
Preceded by Seat created	Member for Yan Yean; 1992–2002	Succeeded by Danielle Green
Preceded by Seat created	Member for Kororoit; 2002–2008	Succeeded by Marlene Kairouz
