= Daniel Andrews =

Premier of Victoria from 2014 to 2023

The Honourable Daniel Andrews AC
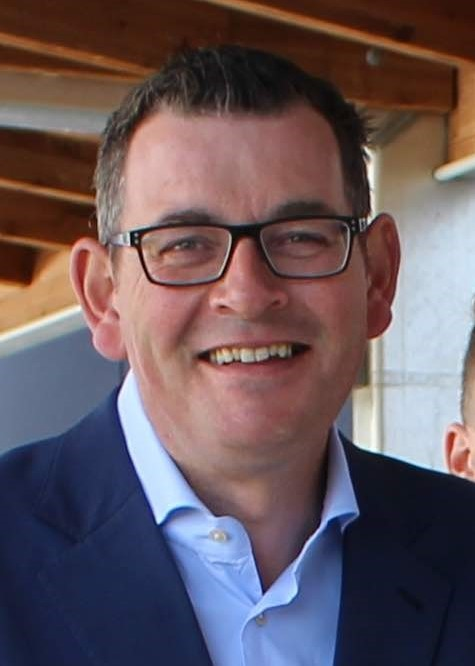
- Andrews in 2018

48th Premier of Victoria
- In office 4 December 2014 – 27 September 2023
- Monarchs: Elizabeth II; Charles III
- Governor: Alex Chernov; Linda Dessau; Margaret Gardner
- Deputy: James Merlino; Jacinta Allan
- Preceded by: Denis Napthine
- Succeeded by: Jacinta Allan

17th Leader of the Victorian Labor Party
- In office 3 December 2010 – 27 September 2023
- Deputy: Rob Hulls; James Merlino; Jacinta Allan
- Preceded by: John Brumby
- Succeeded by: Jacinta Allan

Leader of the Opposition in Victoria
- In office 3 December 2010 – 4 December 2014
- Premier: Ted Baillieu; Denis Napthine
- Deputy: Rob Hulls; James Merlino
- Preceded by: Ted Baillieu
- Succeeded by: Matthew Guy

Minister for Health
- In office 3 August 2007 – 2 December 2010
- Premier: John Brumby
- Preceded by: Bronwyn Pike
- Succeeded by: David Davis

Minister for Gaming
- In office 1 December 2006 – 3 August 2007
- Premier: Steve Bracks
- Preceded by: John Pandazopoulos
- Succeeded by: Tony Robinson

Minister for Consumer Affairs
- In office 1 December 2006 – 3 August 2007
- Premier: Steve Bracks
- Preceded by: Marsha Thomson
- Succeeded by: Tony Robinson

Member of the Victorian Parliament for Mulgrave
- In office 20 November 2002 – 27 September 2023
- Preceded by: District created
- Succeeded by: Eden Foster

Personal details
- Born: Daniel Michael Andrews; 6 July 1972 (age 54) Melbourne, Victoria, Australia
- Party: Labor
- Spouse: Catherine Kesik (m. 1998)
- Children: 3
- Education: Monash University (BA)
- Website: www.danandrews.com.au

Daniel Michael Andrews (born 6 July 1972) is an Australian former politician who served as the 48th premier of Victoria from 2014 to 2023 and the leader of the Victorian Labor Party from 2010 to 2023. He was the member of the Legislative Assembly (MP) for the district of Mulgrave from 2002 to 2023. Andrews is the longest-serving Labor premier and the fourth-longest-serving premier in Victorian state history.

Andrews entered the Bracks Ministry in 2006, serving as the Minister for Consumer Affairs. The following year, he was later appointed Minister for Health in the Brumby Ministry until the defeat of the government at the 2010 election by Ted Baillieu. Whilst in opposition, Andrews was elected Leader of the Labor Party in Victoria, and became Leader of the Opposition.

After one term in opposition, Andrews led Labor to victory in the 2014 election. He was sworn in Premier in December of that year. He led his party to an increased majority of eight seats in the lower house during the 2018 election, and to a third landslide victory at the 2022 election again increasing the party's majority in the house. Significant historical events during Andrews's time as premier included the 2019–20 Australian bushfire season and the COVID-19 pandemic.

Andrews has been described as "the dominant political figure of his generation in Victoria, with considerable influence nationally". Major accomplishments of his government included the Big Build infrastructure projects, rental law reforms, voluntary assisted dying, legalisation of medicinal cannabis, adoption reforms, sex work decriminalisation, first nations treaties, safe injection rooms, compensation reform for victims of institutionalised child-sex abuse, and the introduction of exclusion zones for protests outside abortion clinics. Issues raised during his leadership include the heavy handed response to the pandemic, where the lockdown of public housing towers occurred.

== Early life and education ==
Andrews was born 6 July 1972 in Williamstown Hospital, in south-western Melbourne. His parents, Bob and Jan Andrews, were both bank workers who lived in and later owned a milk bar in Glenroy. Andrews has a younger sister, Cynthia. Both Andrews and his sister were raised as devout Catholics and attended church every Sunday.

After an explosion in a neighbouring shop gutted the family business, Bob started working for Don Smallgoods as a delivery driver. In 1983, the family moved to Wangaratta in north-eastern Victoria, where Bob was offered a delivery round by Don and where Jan went back to work for a bank. In Wangaratta, Andrews was educated at the Marist Brothers' Galen Catholic College.

Andrews moved back to Melbourne in the 1990s to attend Monash University, where he was a resident of Mannix College. He supported his studies by selling hotdogs near a nightclub. While at university Andrews joined the Labor Party and became a part of the Socialist Left faction. Andrews graduated with a Bachelor of Arts degree in politics and classics in 1996. In 1995, Andrews became an electorate officer for federal Labor MP Alan Griffin. He worked at the party's head office from 1999 to 2002, initially as an organiser, and then as assistant state secretary.

== Early political career ==
=== Bracks Government (2002–2007) ===
Upon his election to parliament in the Legislative Assembly seat of Mulgrave at the 2002 election, Andrews was appointed Parliamentary Secretary for Health in the Steve Bracks Labor government. Following the 2006 election, Andrews was appointed to the Cabinet, becoming Minister for Gaming, Minister for Consumer Affairs and Multicultural Affairs. In her biography on Andrews, Sumeyya Ilanbey writes that Labor figures have stated that during his time as Gaming Minister "Andrews' enduring relationship with influential businesspeople began".

=== Brumby Government (2007–2010) ===
In 2007, Andrews became Minister for Health in the John Brumby Labor government. In 2008, Andrews voted in favour of abortion law reform in Victoria. As Health Minister during the passing of the Abortion Law Reform Act 2008, Andrews sought counsel from senior church clergy who advised him that the act was contrary to Church teaching. Andrews replied that he "did not intend to be a Catholic health minister. It was my intention to be a Victorian health minister."

=== Opposition (2010–2014) ===
Brumby resigned as leader of the Victorian Labor Party following the Labor defeat at the 2010 election, after 11 years of Labor governments. On 3 December 2010, Andrews was elected Victorian Labor Party leader, becoming Leader of the Opposition in Victoria, with former Deputy Premier Rob Hulls staying on as his deputy. Hulls resigned in early 2012 and was replaced as deputy by James Merlino. Labor took the lead in the polls in mid-2012 and held it for all but a few months until the election, though Andrews consistently trailed his Liberal counterparts, Ted Baillieu (2010–2013) and Denis Napthine (2013–2014) as preferred premier.

== Premier of Victoria (2014–2023) ==
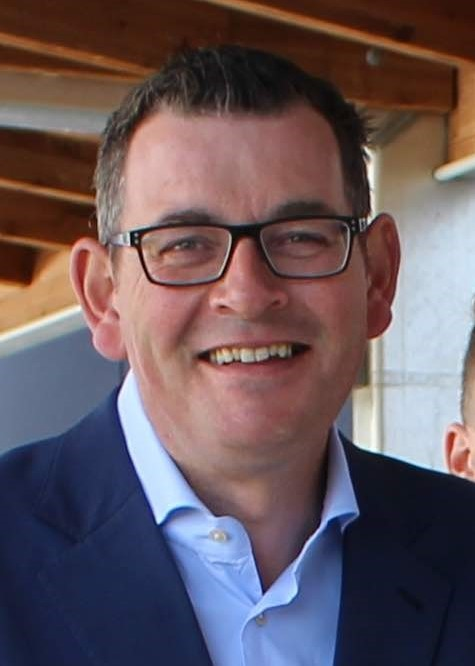
- Premiership of Daniel Andrews; 4 December 2014 – 27 September 2023
- Premier: Daniel Andrews
- Governor: Alex Chernov; Linda Dessau; Margaret Gardner
- Cabinet: Andrews I Andrews II; Andrews III
- Party: Victorian Labor
- Election: 2014 · 2018 · 2022
- Appointed by: Governor Alex Chernov
- Seat: 1 Treasury Place
- Coat of arms of Victoria

=== 2014 state election ===
Labor held 43 seats at dissolution but notionally held 40 after the redistribution of electoral boundaries. It thus needed a net gain of five seats to form government. At the election, Labor gained seven seats for a total of 47, a majority of two. The election was the first time since 1955 that an incumbent government was removed from office after a single term. In his victory speech, Andrews declared, "The people of Victoria have today given to us the greatest of gifts, entrusted to us the greatest of responsibilities, and bestowed upon us the greatest of honours. We will not let them down!" He started as premier on 4 December 2014.

=== First term (2014–2018) ===
On winning office, Andrews government cancelled the East West Link project and initiated the Level Crossing Removal Project and the Melbourne Metro Rail Project. On 24 May 2016, Andrews made an official apology in parliament for gay men in Victoria punished during the time homosexuality was a crime in the state. It was decriminalised in 1981. In August 2018, Andrews announced plans to build the Suburban Rail Loop, connecting all major rail lines via Melbourne Airport.

==== Ending ambulance dispute ====
Shortly after his taking office in 2014, Daniel Andrews ended the pay dispute with ambulance paramedics, which had started with the previous government. During the dispute, paramedics had protested by covering their ambulances with colourful slogans. The slogans were removed after Andrews promised to end the dispute.

==== China ====
As Premier, Andrews priortised relations between with China and ministers were directed to visit in their official capacity.

His government signed a memorandum of understanding (MoU) with the Chinese government under the Belt and Road Initiative in October 2018, but kept its details secret until he released it five weeks later. The MoU involved cooperation on facilities connectivity, unimpeded trade, finance, people-to-people bonds, and the "Digital Silkroad". Cooperation was to be in the form of "dialogue, joint research, pilot programs, knowledge sharing, and capacity building". Andrews said at the time that the MoU "does not bind Victoria to be involved in any specific project or initiative" and "the government will consider both the Victorian and national interest before agreeing to be involved in any specific activity".

On 21 April 2021, the Commonwealth Government used its veto powers to cancel the agreements made between Victoria and China under the Belt and Road Initiative.

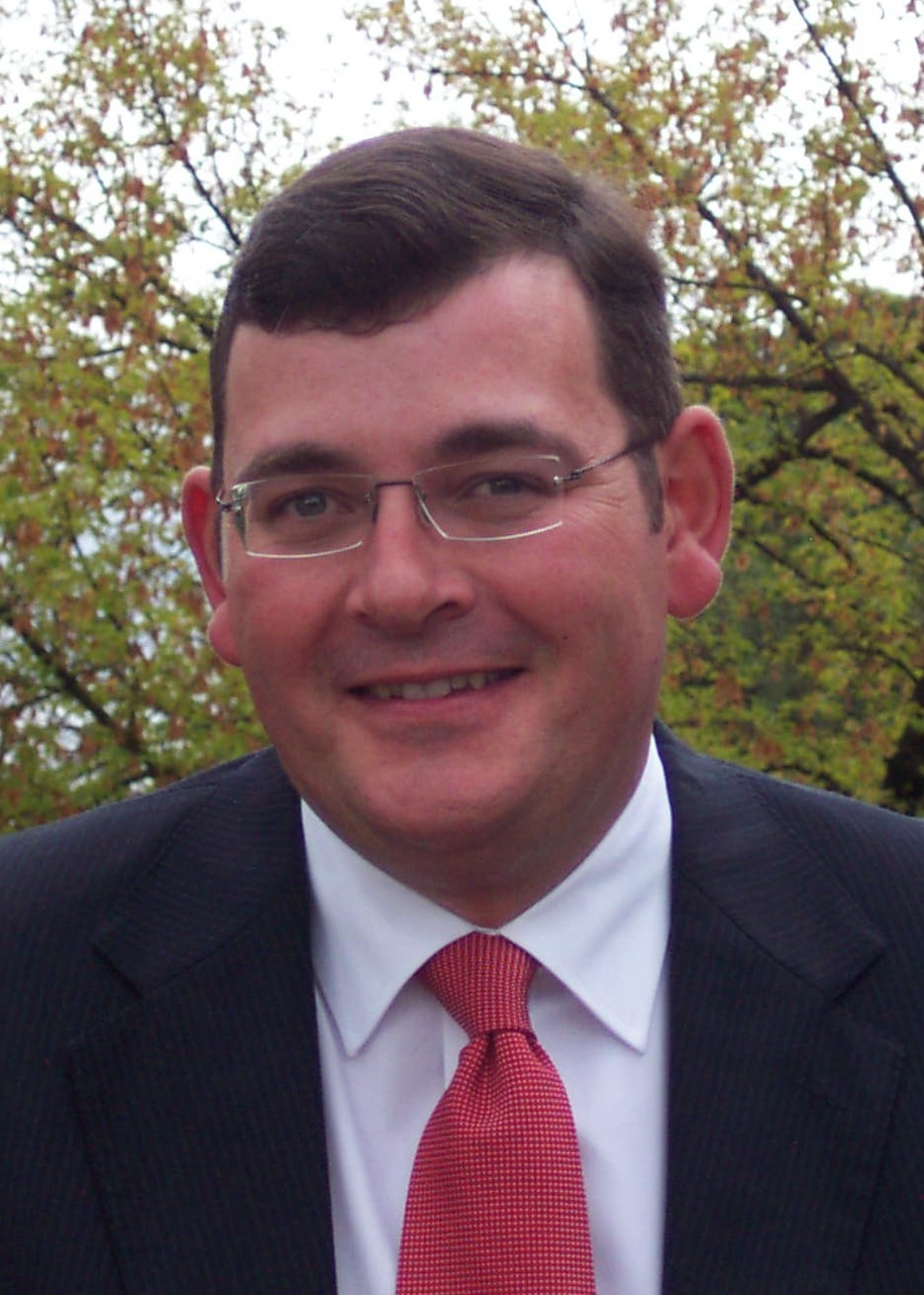
Andrews at the Kew Festival in 2009

==== Port of Melbourne lease ====
In September 2016, the Andrews Government privatised the Port of Melbourne for a term of 50 years in return for more than $9.7 billion.

==== Euthanasia ====
On 20 September 2017, the Voluntary Assisted Dying Bill 2017 was introduced into the Legislative Assembly of the Victorian Parliament by the Andrews Labor Government. The bill is modelled on the recommendations of an expert panel chaired by former Australian Medical Association president Professor Brian Owler. The proposed legislation was said by proponents to be the most conservative in the world and contain 68 safeguards including measures designed to protect vulnerable people from coercion and abuse, as well as a board to review each case. Labor and Coalition MPs were allowed a conscience vote on the Bill.

The bill was debated in the lower house over three sitting days, passing the Assembly without amendment on 20 October 2017 after an emotional and tense debate which lasted more than 24 hours. The bill was passed by 47 votes to 37. The Bill finally passed through parliament, with amendments made in the Victorian Legislative Council, on 29 November 2017.

In passing the bill, Victoria became the first state to legislate for voluntary assisted dying. The law received royal assent on 5 December 2017, and came into effect on 19 June 2019.

=== 2018 state election ===
At the November 2018 state election, Labor won a comprehensive victory, picking up an eight-seat swing for a total of 55 seats, tying Labor's second-best seat count in Victoria. The party recorded substantial swings in Melbourne's politically volatile eastern suburbs, which usually decide elections in Victoria.

As the ABC's election analyst Antony Green put it, eastern Melbourne was swept up in a "band of red," exceeding the most optimistic projections. Labor also took a number of seats in areas considered Liberal heartland, including Baillieu's former seat of Hawthorn. It is only the fifth time that a Labor government has been reelected in Victoria.

=== Second term (2018–2022) ===
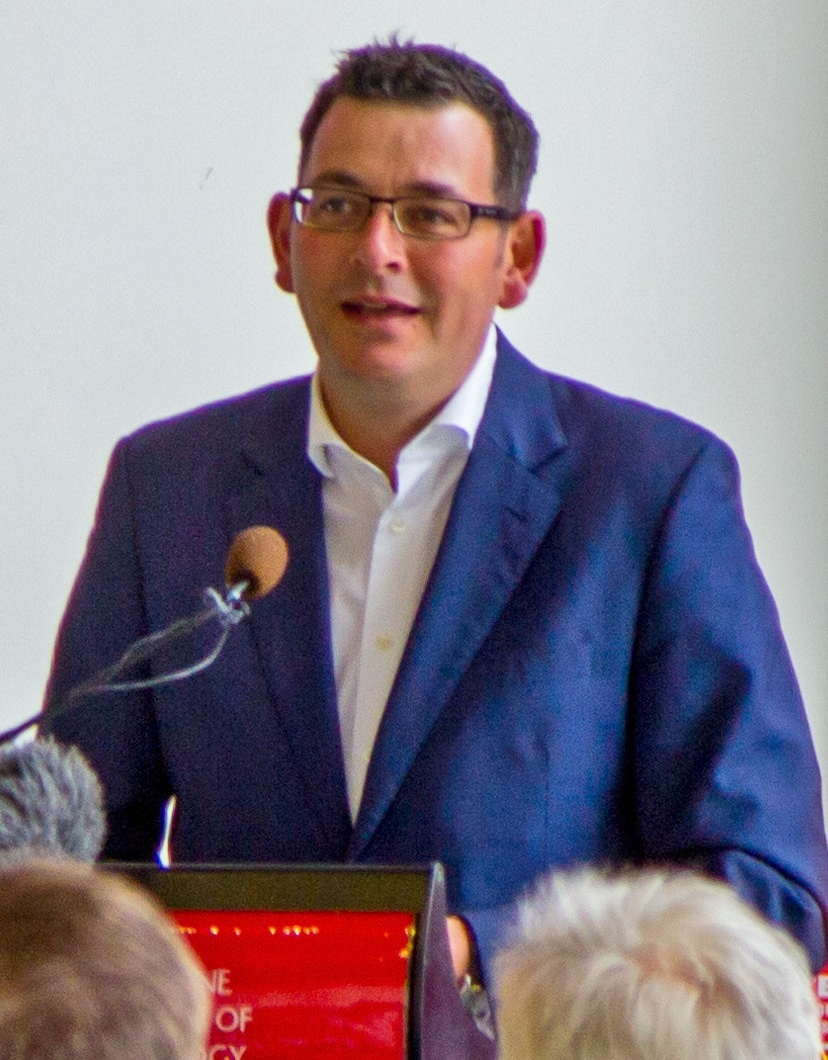
Andrews speaking at the launch of Melbourne International Games Week 2015

In 2019, an independent tribunal granted Andrews an 11.8% salary increase, giving him a total salary of $441,000 and making him the highest-paid state premier in the country.

Andrews received praise for his leadership during the 2019–20 Victorian bushfires.

Andrews faced criticism and praise from various groups for his response to the COVID-19 pandemic in Victoria. Andrews visited China again on a trade mission in 2023.

==== Privatisation ====
In 2018, the Andrews government oversaw the privatisation of the land titles and registry office for $2.8 billion. In 2022, the Andrews government oversaw the privatisation of the operation of the registration and licensing part of VicRoads.

==== COVID-19 pandemic ====
During his second term, Andrews led the State's response to the COVID-19 pandemic. In late June 2020, cases began to rise primarily originating from breaches in hotel quarantine. On 20 June, with the state recording 25 cases, Andrews mostly delayed the planned easing of restrictions and reinstated stricter home gathering rules. On 30 June, with the state recording 64 new infections, Andrews announced stage 3 restrictions for 10 postcodes within metropolitan Melbourne, suspended international flights and announced a judicial inquiry into the state's hotel quarantine program. Andrews announced a further two postcodes would return to stage 3 restrictions and a 'hard lockdown' of public housing towers in North Melbourne and Kensington on 4 July. The Ombudsman later criticised the timing and conduct of the lockdown as potentially violating the residents' rights to humane treatment. On 7 July, Andrews announced the reimposition of stage 3 restrictions for metropolitan Melbourne and Mitchell Shire as the state recorded 191 new cases. Under these restrictions, residents in the affected area could only leave the home for exercise, obtaining supplies, work if it couldn't be done from home and to provide care and compassion.

In early August 2020, following a spike in COVID-19 infections in Victoria with up to 750 new infections detected per day, Andrews declared a State of Disaster and announced Stage 4 lockdown rules for 31 metropolitan Melbourne municipalities and Stage 3 rules for regional parts of the state. The Stage 4 rules for Melbourne included compulsory face masks, all but essential businesses closed, residents only being allowed to leave their homes once a day to shop for essential items only, and once a day to exercise for a maximum of one hour. Both these activities were restricted to within five kilometres of home. All schooling was to be done remotely using electronic communication. A nightly curfew from 8 pm to 5 am was introduced. Exemptions existed for workers deemed essential.

The restrictions correlated with a reduction in the rate of infections, such that by mid-September 2020 the 14-day case average was 44.4 rather than 63 predicted by the modelling done when they were introduced. Restrictions began to ease from that time. On 26 October 2020, Victoria recorded no new cases and no new deaths, its first day of no cases since early June. The achievement was called "Donut Day". In 2021, further COVID-19 outbreaks in Victoria led to lockdowns being reinstated a further four times, with restrictions including a 9:00 pm–5:00 am curfew and 5 km travel limit reinstated for residents of metropolitan Melbourne. In October 2021, Andrews was fined $400 for breaching face mask rules on two occasions, in both cases he walked through a car park at Parliament House to his press conference without wearing a mask.

==== Public opinion ====
In April 2020, 77% approved of Andrews' handling of the coronavirus pandemic; this was the third highest figure out of all of Australia's premiers. A September 2020 Roy Morgan Research poll showed that 70% approved of the way Andrews was handling his job as Premier of Victoria, and a September 2020 Newspoll showed that 62% agreed that Andrews handled Victoria's COVID-19 response well. In November 2020, a Roy Morgan Research showed that Andrews' approval rating had increased by 9%, with 71% of Victorian electors approving of his handling of his job. By the time of the 2022 state election, Andrews' approval ratings had declined, but still remained relatively high, and he consistently led Opposition Leader Matthew Guy in opinion polling throughout his term.

==== Media coverage ====
During the early years of the COVID-19 pandemic, conservative commentators criticised the Andrews' government for its introduction of vaccination mandates, prolonged lockdowns and failures in hotel quarantine in 2020. Conservative-leaning media outlets, in particular those owned by News Corp Australia, gave Andrews the label "Dictator Dan" because of the strict measures his government took to suppress the spread of COVID-19. His popularity remained high and the daily media conferences he gave to explain his position and reasoning were a television ratings hit. Several media outlets and commentators have accused News Corp of biased reporting against Andrews, including former prime minister Kevin Rudd.

=== 2022 state election ===
Andrews led the Victorian Labor Party to a third term in a further emphatic victory over the Coalition at the 2022 election. Despite heavy swings against the party in some Northern and Western suburb electorates, the party increased its majority with a net gain of 1 seat, according to ABC News. Labor picked up swings in Eastern suburbs seats which were unexpectedly won in the 2018 landslide result, and also gained the electoral districts of Glen Waverley, Hastings and Ripon from incumbent Liberal MPs. Labor also retained the electoral districts of Bayswater and Bass, which became notionally Liberal after the redistribution. Andrews also easily withstood an Independent challenger, Ian Cook, in his electorate of Mulgrave, winning more than 50% of the primary votes in the electorate. Following his election win, he has been described as "the dominant political figure of his generation in Victoria, with considerable influence nationally".

=== Third term (2022–2023) ===
In April 2023, Andrews became the longest-serving Labor Premier in Victoria's history, overtaking John Cain Jr., who served from 1982 to 1990. Having served more than 3,000 days as Victorian Premier as of February 2023, he became entitled to a statue in his likeness outside 1 Treasury Place.

Andrews pledged to re-establish the state-owned State Electricity Commission, remove a total of 110 Level Crossings, establish free kindergarten and commence construction on the Suburban Rail Loop (SRL) and SRL Airport Line during his third term.

On 18 July 2023, Andrews and Deputy Premier Jacinta Allan announced the state government intended to cancel the 2026 Commonwealth Games. Fifteen months after agreeing to host the Games, he said the cost had escalated to an estimated $6–7 billion, double the estimated benefits, and the government could not justify the expense. A later Victorian Auditor-General report found the abandoned games cost Victoria more than $589 million and that the government's estimated cost had been overstated. Andrews also set up a process that continued under his successor, Jacinta Allan, to formulate a treaty for First Nations peoples in Victoria.

==== Resignation ====
At a media conference on 26 September 2023, Andrews announced his resignation as premier, leader of the Victorian Labor Party, and member for Mulgrave, to take effect the following day at 5:00 pm. He cited thoughts of life following his premiership, which he felt meant "it is time to go". Prime minister Anthony Albanese said he was "surprised by the date of the resignation" and praised Andrews's career and character. Other current and former state premiers congratulated Andrews on his premiership. Andrews was succeeded as premier and party leader by his deputy Jacinta Allan after she was elected unopposed by the Labor caucus.

== Post-political career ==
On 18 October 2024, Andrews was appointed as the chair of Orygen, a youth mental health foundation. On 3 September 2025, Andrews attended the 2025 China Victory Day Parade among other current and former world leaders. This attendance drew criticism from the Australian media and some senior Labor figures for attending the parade, questioning the appropriateness of his involvement. Andrew's successor as Victorian premier, Jacinta Allan, expressed support and said that it is important to maintain Victoria's positive relations with China. Since his retirement from politics, Andrews has been establishing a consultant business with links to China, including working for Fortescue Metals.

=== 'Bike Boy' conspiracy theory ===
At 1:30 pm on 7 January 2013, Andrews was in a car being driven by his wife when there was a collision with a bicycle being ridden by 15-year-old Ryan Meuleman. Police closed an investigation with a finding that there was no driver error, and a later anti-corruption investigation into the police cleared them of any wrongdoing. During the COVID-19 pandemic, conspiracy theorists, far-right activists, pandemic lockdown opponents, conservative commentators from the Herald Sun, and political opponents from the Victorian Liberal Party alleged that Andrews or his family were at fault and that there has been a cover-up.

In November 2024, audio from the phone call Andrews made to triple-zero was released following a request under parliamentary privilege by Libertarian MLC David Limbrick. In November 2025, Meuleman initiated a lawsuit against Andrews in the Federal Court.

== Political positions ==
Andrews has been a member of the Labor Left faction since he joined the party in 1993. Having been an advocate for environmentalism and action to combat climate change, he supported the pledge for net zero emissions by 2050, and has started plans to renationalise the state electricity grid following the 2022 state election. Andrews has furthermore been a long time republican, and supports abolishing Australia's constitutional monarchy in favour of a federal republic.

Andrews has voiced support throughout his career for same sex marriage, the protection and expansion of LGBT rights and the promotion of awareness and respect for transgender and transitioning people, particularly amongst young Victorians. On 24 May 2016, Andrews issued a formal apology on behalf of the Victorian Government, to the LGBT community, and specifically members of the community who had been charged with homosexual offences and crimes in the state prior to the decriminalisation of homosexuality in 1981. Premier Andrews said in a speech to the Victorian Parliament:

"On behalf of the parliament, the government and the people of Victoria: for the laws we passed, and the lives we ruined, and the standards we set, we are so sorry; humbly, deeply, sorry."

Andrews, who is Catholic himself, has also been an outspoken critic of the Catholic Church in Australia, for their failure to adequately respond to extensive issues relating to child sexual abuse. On the death of Australia's most senior Catholic, Cardinal George Pell, Andrews remarked that his government would make no offer for a state funeral and instead made the following statement:

"For victim-survivors, [I want] to send the clearest possible message: We see you, we believe you, we support you and you're at the centre of not only our thoughts, not only our words, but our actions."

Andrews has somewhat conservative views towards illicit drugs, being against the decriminalisation of recreational marijuana, and also against pill testing at music festivals.

== Personal life ==
Andrews met Catherin Kesik—a lawyer's daughter from Mornington, who had been educated at Catholic schools—at Mannix College in 1991 and they married on New Year's Eve 1998. They have three children, the first of whom was born in 2002. Andrews had a Roman Catholic upbringing, although he rarely attends church. Andrews is a supporter of the Essendon Football Club.

On the morning of 9 March 2021, Andrews slipped and fell on wet steps while on holiday on the Mornington Peninsula. He was taken to hospital where he was placed under intensive care. He suffered several broken ribs and a broken vertebra from the fall. Deputy Premier James Merlino was the Acting Premier until Andrews returned on 28 June 2021. Andrews contracted COVID-19 in March 2022. He continued to carry out his duties from isolation, and made a full recovery. In December 2025, he was admitted to hospital for an unknown medical issue which he said was "minor".

== Honours ==
As part of the 2024 King's Birthday Honours, Andrews was appointed a Companion of the Order of Australia for "eminent service to the people and Parliament of Victoria, to public health, to policy and regulatory reform, and to infrastructure development."

Victorian Legislative Assembly
District re-established	Member of the Legislative Assembly for Mulgrave; 2002–2023	Succeeded by Eden Foster
Political offices
Preceded by Marsha Thomson	Minister for Consumer Affairs; 2006–2007	Succeeded by Tony Robinson
Preceded by John Pandazopoulos	Minister for Gaming; 2006–2007	Succeeded by James Merlino
Preceded by John Thwaites	Minister for Health; 2007–2010	Succeeded by David Davis
Preceded by Ted Baillieu	Leader of the Opposition of Victoria; 2010–2014	Succeeded by Matthew Guy
Preceded by Denis Napthine	Premier of Victoria; 2014–2023	Succeeded by Jacinta Allan
Party political offices
Preceded by John Brumby	Leader of the Labor Party in Victoria; 2010–2023	Succeeded by Jacinta Allan
