= Jan Wade =

Australian politician

The Honourable Jan Wade

Attorney-General of Victoria
- In office 6 October 1992 – 21 October 1999
- Premier: Jeff Kennett
- Preceded by: Jim Kennan
- Succeeded by: Rob Hulls

Minister for Fair Trading
- In office 6 October 1992 – 21 October 1999
- Preceded by: Theo Theophanous
- Succeeded by: Marsha Thomson

Minister for Women's Affairs
- In office 6 October 1992 – 21 October 1999
- Preceded by: Joan Kirner
- Succeeded by: Sherryl Garbutt

Member of the Victorian Legislative Assembly for Kew
- In office 19 March 1988 – 17 September 1999
- Preceded by: Prue Sibree
- Succeeded by: Andrew McIntosh

Personal details
- Born: Jan Louise Murray Noone; 8 July 1937 (age 89) Sydney, New South Wales, Australia
- Party: Liberal
- Spouse: Peter Brian Wade (m. 1978)
- Education: University of Melbourne
- Occupation: Teacher • university tutor • visiting professor
- Profession: Solicitor

Jan Louise Murray Wade (née Noone; born 8 July 1937) is an Australian former politician.

She was born in Sydney to John Murray Noone and Lillian, née Knight. She attended Sydney High School and Firbank Girls' Grammar School in Melbourne, and graduated from the University of Melbourne in 1959 with a Bachelor of Law. She later attained a Bachelor of Arts in 1979.

She married Francis Bannatyne Lewis, with whom she had four children. From 1960 to 1961 she worked in London as a schoolteacher before returning to Australia as a law tutor at the University of Melbourne from 1963 to 1964. A solicitor from 1964 to 1967, she joined the Parliamentary Counsel's office in 1967, becoming Assistant Chief Parliamentary Counsel in 1978. Also in 1978, she married Peter Brian Wade, and, in so doing, acquired a step-daughter. In 1979, she was appointed Commissioner for Corporate Affairs and, in 1985, President of the Equal Opportunity Board.

In 1988, she successfully contested a by-election in the Victorian Legislative Assembly seat of Kew, for the Liberal Party. After her election she was appointed Shadow Attorney-General. She moved to Women's Affairs in 1989 but resumed her previous role in 1990. Following the Coalition victory at the 1992 state election she became Attorney-General, Minister for Fair Trading, and Minister for Women's Affairs.

She retired from politics in 1999, after which she was a visiting professor at Victoria University and a writer of an occasional column in the Australian Financial Review.

Victorian Legislative Assembly
Preceded by Prue Sibree	Member for Kew; 1988–1999	Succeeded by Andrew McIntosh
Political offices
Preceded by Jim Kennan	Attorney-General of Victoria; 1992–1999	Succeeded by Rob Hulls
Preceded by Theo Theophanous as Minister for Consumer Affairs	Minister for Fair Trading; 1992–1999	Succeeded by Marsha Thomson as Minister for Consumer Affairs
Preceded by Joan Kirner	Minister for Women's Affairs; 1992–1999	Succeeded by Sherryl Garbutt
