= Minister for Consumer Affairs (Victoria) =

Australian state ministry portfolio

Minister for Consumer Affairs of Victoria
- Victorian coat of arms

- Flag of Victoria
- Incumbent; Paul Edbrooke MP since 13 April 2026
- Consumer Affairs Victoria
- Style: The Honourable
- Member of: Parliament; Executive council
- Reports to: Premier
- Nominator: Premier
- Appointer: Governor on the recommendation of the premier
- Term length: At the governor's pleasure
- Inaugural holder: Joe Rafferty MP
- Formation: 30 May 1973

The Minister for Consumer Affairs is a ministry portfolio within the Executive Council of Victoria.

== Ministers ==
Order	MP	Party affiliation	Ministerial title	Term start	Term end	Time in office	Notes
1	Joe Rafferty MP	Liberal	Minister of Consumer Affairs	30 May 1973	31 March 1976	2 years, 306 days	
2	Rob Maclellan MP	Liberal	Minister of Consumer Affairs	31 March 1976	16 August 1978	2 years, 138 days	
3	Jim Ramsay MP	Liberal	Minister of Consumer Affairs	16 August 1978	5 June 1981	2 years, 293 days	
4	Haddon Storey MLC	Liberal	Minister of Consumer Affairs	5 June 1981	8 April 1982	307 days	
5	Jack Ginifer MP	Labor	Minister of Consumer Affairs	8 April 1982	10 May 1982	32 days	
6	Peter Spyker MP	Labor	Minister of Consumer Affairs	10 May 1982	14 December 1987	5 years, 218 days	
7	Tom Roper MP	Labor	Minister for Consumer Affairs	14 December 1987	10 August 1990	2 years, 239 days	
8	Brian Mier MLC	Labor	Minister for Consumer Affairs	10 August 1990	15 August 1991	1 year, 5 days	
9	Theo Theophanous MLC	Labor	Minister for Consumer Affairs	15 August 1991	6 October 1992	1 year, 52 days	
10	Jan Wade MP	Liberal	Minister for Fair Trading	6 October 1992	20 October 1999	7 years, 14 days	
11	Marsha Thomson MLC	Labor	Minister for Consumer Affairs	20 October 1999	12 February 2002	2 years, 115 days	
12	Christine Campbell MP	Labor	Minister for Consumer Affairs	12 February 2002	5 December 2002	296 days	
13	John Lenders MLC	Labor	Minister for Consumer Affairs	5 December 2002	25 January 2005	2 years, 51 days	
(11)	Marsha Thomson MLC	Labor	Minister for Consumer Affairs	25 January 2005	1 December 2006	1 year, 310 days	
14	Daniel Andrews MP	Labor	Minister for Consumer Affairs	1 December 2006	3 August 2007	245 days	
15	Tony Robinson MP	Labor	Minister for Consumer Affairs	3 August 2007	2 December 2010	3 years, 121 days	
16	Michael O'Brien MP	Liberal	Minister for Consumer Affairs	2 December 2010	13 March 2013	2 years, 101 days	
17	Heidi Victoria MP	Liberal	Minister for Consumer Affairs	13 March 2013	4 December 2014	1 year, 266 days	
18	Jane Garrett MP	Labor	Minister for Consumer Affairs, Gaming and Liquor Regulation	4 December 2014	10 June 2016	1 year, 189 days	
19	Marlene Kairouz MP	Labor	Minister for Consumer Affairs, Gaming and Liquor Regulation	20 June 2016	16 June 2020	3 years, 362 days	
20	Melissa Horne MP	Labor	Minister for Consumer Affairs, Gaming and Liquor Regulation	22 June 2020	5 December 2022	2 years, 166 days	
21	Danny Pearson MP	Labor	Minister for Consumer Affairs	5 December 2022	2 October 2023	301 days	
22	Gabrielle Williams MP	Labor	Minister for Consumer Affairs	2 October 2023	19 December 2024	1 year, 78 days	
23	Nick Staikos MP	Labor	Minister for Consumer Affairs	19 December 2024	13 April 2026	1 year, 262 days	
24	Paul Edbrooke MP	Labor	Minister for Consumer Affairs	13 April 2026	Incumbent	147 days	
