= Minister for Casino, Gaming and Liquor Regulation =

Australian state ministry portfolio in Victoria

Minister for Casino, Gaming and Liquor Regulation of Victoria
- Victorian coat of arms

- Flag of Victoria
- Incumbent; Enver Erdogan MLC since 19 December 2024
- Style: The Honourable
- Member of: Parliament; Executive council
- Reports to: Premier
- Nominator: Premier
- Appointer: Governor on the recommendation of the premier
- Term length: At the governor's pleasure
- Precursor: Minister for Gaming; Minister for Gaming Regulation; Minister for Minister for Consumer Affairs, Gaming and Liquor Regulation
- Inaugural holder: David White MLC
- Formation: 15 August 1991

The Minister for Casino, Gaming and Liquor Regulation is a ministry portfolio within the Executive Council of Victoria, Australia.

== Ministers ==
Order	MP	Party affiliation	Ministerial title	Term start	Term end	Time in office	Notes
1	David White MLC	Labor	Minister for Gaming	15 August 1991	28 January 1992	166 days	
2	Tom Roper MP	Labor	Minister for Gaming	28 January 1992	6 October 1992	252 days	
3	Haddon Storey MLC	Liberal	Minister for Gaming	6 October 1992	3 April 1996	3 years, 180 days	
4	Roger Hallam MLC	Nationals	Minister for Gaming	3 April 1996	20 October 1999	3 years, 200 days	
5	John Pandazopoulos MP	Labor	Minister for Gaming	20 October 1999	1 December 2006	7 years, 42 days	
6	Daniel Andrews MP	Labor	Minister for Gaming	1 December 2006	3 August 2007	245 days	
7	Tony Robinson MP	Labor	Minister for Gaming	3 August 2007	2 December 2010	3 years, 121 days	
8	Michael O'Brien MP	Liberal	Minister for Gaming	2 December 2010	13 March 2013	2 years, 101 days	
9	Andrew McIntosh MP	Liberal	Minister for Gaming Regulation	13 March 2013	16 April 2013	34 days	
10	Edward O'Donohue MLC	Liberal	Minister for Liquor and Gaming Regulation	22 April 2013	4 December 2014	1 year, 226 days	
11	Jane Garrett MP	Labor	Minister for Consumer Affairs, Gaming and Liquor Regulation	4 December 2014	10 June 2016	1 year, 189 days	
12	Marlene Kairouz MP	Labor	Minister for Consumer Affairs, Gaming and Liquor Regulation	20 June 2016	16 June 2020	3 years, 362 days	
13	Melissa Horne MP	Labor	Minister for Consumer Affairs, Gaming and Liquor Regulation	22 June 2020	5 December 2022	2 years, 166 days	
13	Melissa Horne MP	Labor	Minister for Casino, Gaming and Liquor Regulation	5 December 2022	19 December 2024	2 years, 14 days	
14	Enver Erdogan MLC	Labor	Minister for Casino, Gaming and Liquor Regulation	19 December 2024	Incumbent	1 year, 262 days	
