= List of premiers of Victoria =

Heads of government of Australian state

The premier of Victoria is the head of government of the Australian state of Victoria. The premier leads the Cabinet of Victoria and selects its ministers. The premier is appointed by the governor of Victoria and must be a member of the Victorian Legislative Assembly. To be appointed, the premier must command confidence in the Legislative Assembly, meaning that they must have the support of a majority of Legislative Assembly members. In practice, this is typically the leader of the political party who holds the support of a majority of lower house members.

Each premier since 1933, apart from Ian Macfarlan, who only served for 51 days, has had a portrait commissioned for the Victorian Parliament's portrait collection. The tradition was initiated by Legislative Council President Fred Grimwade. Premiers who hold the office for 3,000 days are granted a statue as a commemoration of their legacy. Five premiers, Daniel Andrews, Henry Bolte, John Cain Jr, Albert Dunstan, and Rupert Hamer, have achieved this milestone and four have their statues near the premier's office at 1 Treasury Place. James McCulloch also served for over 3,000 days but he did so across four separate terms between 1863 and 1877 and has not been honoured with a statue; the prior five achieved 3,000 in a single term (Dunstan then served a second, shorter, term).

The longest-serving premier was Henry Bolte, who served from 7 June 1955 to 23 August 1972 for a total of 17 years, and 77 days in office. He was a member of the Liberal Party. By contrast, the shortest-serving premier was George Elmslie, who served from 9 December 1913 to 22 December 1913 for a total of 13 days in office. He was also the first premier from the Labor Party. The current premier is Ben Carroll of the Labor Party, who assumed the office on 28 July 2026 following the resignation of Jacinta Allan.

== List of premiers of Victoria ==
Political parties

Independent
Reform
Commonwealth Liberal
Labor
Nationalist
Country
United Australia
Liberal

List of premiers of Victoria
No.	Portrait	Premier	Election	Term of office			Political party/ alignment	Ministry	Monarch	Governor	Notes
No.	Portrait	Premier	Election	Took office	Left office	Time in office	Political party/ alignment	Ministry	Monarch	Governor	Notes
1		William Haines (1810–1866); MP for South Grant	1856	28 November 1855	11 March 1857	1 year, 104 days	Independent	Haines I	Victoria	Charles Hotham	
1		William Haines (1810–1866); MP for South Grant	1856	28 November 1855	11 March 1857	1 year, 104 days	Independent	Haines I	Victoria	Henry Barkly	
2		John O'Shanassy (1818–1883); MP for Kilmore	—	11 March 1857	29 April 1857	50 days	Independent	O'Shanassy I	Victoria	Henry Barkly	
(1)		William Haines (1810–1866); MP for South Grant	—	29 April 1857	10 March 1858	316 days	Independent	Haines II	Victoria	Henry Barkly	
(2)		John O'Shanassy (1818–1883); MP for Kilmore	—	10 March 1858	27 October 1859	1 year, 232 days	Independent	O'Shanassy II	Victoria	Henry Barkly	
3		William Nicholson (1816–1865); MP for Sandridge	1859	27 October 1859	26 November 1860	1 year, 31 days	Independent	Nicholson	Victoria	Henry Barkly	
4		Richard Heales (1822–1864); MP for East Bourke Boroughs	1861	26 November 1860	14 November 1861	354 days	Independent	Heales	Victoria	Henry Barkly	
(2)		John O'Shanassy (1818–1883); MP for Kilmore	—	14 November 1861	27 June 1863	1 year, 226 days	Independent	O'Shanassy III	Victoria	Henry Barkly	
5		James McCulloch (1819–1893); MP for Mornington	1864; 1866; 1868	27 June 1863	6 May 1868	4 years, 315 days	Independent	McCulloch I	Victoria	Henry Barkly	
5		James McCulloch (1819–1893); MP for Mornington	1864; 1866; 1868	27 June 1863	6 May 1868	4 years, 315 days	Independent	McCulloch I	Victoria	Charles Darling	
5		James McCulloch (1819–1893); MP for Mornington	1864; 1866; 1868	27 June 1863	6 May 1868	4 years, 315 days	Independent	McCulloch I	Victoria	Lord Canterbury	
6		Charles Sladen (1816–1884); MP for Western Province	—	6 May 1868	11 July 1868	67 days	Independent	Sladen	Victoria	Lord Canterbury	
(5)		James McCulloch (1819–1893); MP for Mornington	—	11 July 1868	20 September 1869	1 year, 72 days	Independent	McCulloch II	Victoria	Lord Canterbury	
7		John Alexander MacPherson (1833–1894); MP for Dundas	—	20 September 1869	9 April 1870	202 days	Independent	MacPherson	Victoria	Lord Canterbury	
(5)		James McCulloch (1819–1893); MP for Mornington	1871	9 April 1870	19 June 1871	1 year, 72 days	Independent	McCulloch III	Victoria	Lord Canterbury	
8		Charles Gavan Duffy (1816–1903); MP for Dalhousie	—	19 June 1871	10 June 1872	358 days	Independent	Duffy	Victoria	Lord Canterbury	
9		James Francis (1819–1884); MP for Richmond	1874	10 June 1872	31 July 1874	2 years, 52 days	Independent	Francis	Victoria	Lord Canterbury	
9		James Francis (1819–1884); MP for Richmond	1874	10 June 1872	31 July 1874	2 years, 52 days	Independent	Francis	Victoria	George Bowen	
10		George Kerferd (1831–1889); MP for Ovens	—	31 July 1874	7 August 1875	1 year, 8 days	Independent	Kerferd	Victoria	George Bowen	
11		Graham Berry (1822–1904); MP for Geelong West	—	7 August 1875	20 October 1875	75 days	Non-Party Liberalism	Berry I	Victoria	George Bowen	
(5)		James McCulloch (1819–1893); MP for Warrnambool	—	20 October 1875	21 May 1877	1 year, 214 days	Non-Party Conservatism	McCulloch IV	Victoria	George Bowen	
(11)		Graham Berry (1822–1904); MP for Geelong	1877	21 May 1877	5 March 1880	2 years, 290 days	Non-Party Liberalism	Berry II	Victoria	George Bowen	
(11)		Graham Berry (1822–1904); MP for Geelong	1877	21 May 1877	5 March 1880	2 years, 290 days	Non-Party Liberalism	Berry II	Victoria	Lord Normanby	
12		James Service (1823–1899); MP for Maldon	Feb. 1880	5 March 1880	3 August 1880	152 days	Non-Party Conservatism	Service I	Victoria	Lord Normanby	
(11)		Graham Berry (1822–1904); MP for Geelong	Jul. 1880	3 August 1880	9 July 1881	341 days	Non-Party Liberalism	Berry III	Victoria	Lord Normanby	
13		Bryan O'Loghlen (1828–1905); MP for West Bourke	—	9 July 1881	8 March 1883	1 year, 243 days	Non-Party Liberalism	O'Loghlen	Victoria	Lord Normanby	
(12)		James Service (1823–1899); MP for Castlemaine	1883	8 March 1883	18 February 1886	2 years, 348 days	Non-Party Conservatism	Service II	Victoria	Lord Normanby	
(12)		James Service (1823–1899); MP for Castlemaine	1883	8 March 1883	18 February 1886	2 years, 348 days	Non-Party Conservatism	Service II	Victoria	Henry Loch	
14		Duncan Gillies (1834–1903); MP for Rodney and Eastern Suburbs	1886; 1889	18 February 1886	5 November 1890	4 years, 261 days	Non-Party Conservatism	Gillies	Victoria	Henry Loch	
14		Duncan Gillies (1834–1903); MP for Rodney and Eastern Suburbs	1886; 1889	18 February 1886	5 November 1890	4 years, 261 days	Non-Party Conservatism	Gillies	Victoria	Lord Hopetoun	
15		James Munro (1832–1908); MP for Geelong	—	5 November 1890	16 February 1892	1 year, 104 days	Non-Party Liberalism	Munro	Victoria	Lord Hopetoun	
16		William Shiels (1848–1904); MP for Normanby	1892	16 February 1892	23 January 1893	343 days	Non-Party Liberalism	Shiels	Victoria	Lord Hopetoun	
17		James Patterson (1833–1895); MP for Castlemaine	—	23 January 1893	27 September 1894	1 year, 248 days	Non-Party Conservatism	Patterson	Victoria	Lord Hopetoun	
18		George Turner (1851–1916); MP for St Kilda	1894; 1897	27 September 1894	5 December 1899	5 years, 70 days	Protectionist and Liberal	Turner I	Victoria	Lord Hopetoun	
18		George Turner (1851–1916); MP for St Kilda	1894; 1897	27 September 1894	5 December 1899	5 years, 70 days	Protectionist and Liberal	Turner I	Victoria	Lord Brassey	
19		Allan McLean (1840–1911); MP for Gippsland North	—	5 December 1899	19 November 1900	350 days	Non-Party Liberalism	McLean	Victoria	Lord Brassey	
(18)		George Turner (1851–1916); MP for St Kilda	1900	19 November 1900	12 February 1901	86 days	Non-Party Liberalism	Turner II	Victoria	vacant	
(18)		George Turner (1851–1916); MP for St Kilda	1900	19 November 1900	12 February 1901	86 days	Non-Party Liberalism	Turner II	Edward VII	vacant	
20		Alexander Peacock (1861–1933); MP for Clunes and Allandale	—	12 February 1901	10 June 1902	1 year, 119 days	Non-Party Liberalism	Peacock I	Edward VII	George Clarke	
21		William Irvine (1858–1943); MP for Lowan	1902	10 June 1902	16 February 1904	1 year, 252 days	Reform	Irvine	Edward VII	George Clarke	
22		Thomas Bent (1838–1909); MP for Brighton	1904; 1907; 1908	16 February 1904	8 January 1909	4 years, 328 days	Reform	Bent	Edward VII	Reginald Talbot	
22		Thomas Bent (1838–1909); MP for Brighton	1904; 1907; 1908	16 February 1904	8 January 1909	4 years, 328 days	Reform	Bent	Edward VII	Thomas Gibson-Carmichael	
23		John Murray (1851–1916); MP for Warrnambool	1911	8 January 1909	18 May 1912	3 years, 132 days	Commonwealth Liberal	Murray	Edward VII	Thomas Gibson-Carmichael	
23		John Murray (1851–1916); MP for Warrnambool	1911	8 January 1909	18 May 1912	3 years, 132 days	Commonwealth Liberal	Murray	George V	Thomas Gibson-Carmichael	
23		John Murray (1851–1916); MP for Warrnambool	1911	8 January 1909	18 May 1912	3 years, 132 days	Commonwealth Liberal	Murray	George V	John Fuller	
24		William Watt (1871–1946); MP for Essendon	—	18 May 1912	9 December 1913	1 year, 206 days	Commonwealth Liberal	Watt I	George V	John Fuller	
25		George Elmslie (1861–1918); MP for Albert Park	—	9 December 1913	22 December 1913	14 days	Labor	Elmslie	George V	vacant	
(24)		William Watt (1871–1946); MP for Essendon	—	22 December 1913	18 June 1914	179 days	Commonwealth Liberal	Watt II	George V	Arthur Stanley	
(20)		Alexander Peacock (1861–1933); MP for Allandale	1914	18 June 1914	29 November 1917	3 years, 165 days	Commonwealth Liberal	Peacock II	George V	Arthur Stanley	
26		John Bowser (1858–1936); MP for Wangaratta	1917	29 November 1917	21 March 1918	144 days	Nationalist	Bowser	George V	Arthur Stanley	
27		Harry Lawson (1875–1952); MP for Castlemaine and Maldon	1920; 1921	21 March 1918	28 April 1924	6 years, 39 days	Nationalist	Lawson I Lawson II; Lawson III	George V	Arthur Stanley	
27		Harry Lawson (1875–1952); MP for Castlemaine and Maldon	1920; 1921	21 March 1918	28 April 1924	6 years, 39 days	Nationalist	Lawson I Lawson II; Lawson III	George V	Lord Stradbroke	
(20)		Alexander Peacock (1861–1933); MP for Allandale	—	28 April 1924	18 July 1924	82 days	Nationalist	Peacock III	George V	Lord Stradbroke	
28		George Prendergast (1854–1937); MP for North Melbourne	1924	18 July 1924	18 November 1924	124 days	Labor	Prendergast	George V	Lord Stradbroke	
29		John Allan (1866–1936); MP for Rodney	—	18 November 1924	20 May 1927	2 years, 184 days	Country	John Allan	George V	Lord Stradbroke	
29		John Allan (1866–1936); MP for Rodney	—	18 November 1924	20 May 1927	2 years, 184 days	Country	John Allan	George V	Lord Somers	
30		Edmond Hogan (1883–1964); MP for Warrenheip and Grenville	1927	20 May 1927	22 November 1928	1 year, 187 days	Labor	Hogan I	George V	Lord Somers	
31		William McPherson (1865–1932); MP for Hawthorn	—	22 November 1928	12 December 1929	1 year, 21 days	Nationalist	McPherson	George V	Lord Somers	
(30)		Edmond Hogan (1883–1964); MP for Warrenheip and Grenville	1929	12 December 1929	19 May 1932	2 years, 160 days	Labor	Hogan II	George V	Lord Somers	
32		Stanley Argyle (1867–1940); MP for Toorak	1932; 1935	19 May 1932	2 April 1935	2 years, 319 days	United Australia	Argyle I Argyle II	George V	Lord Huntingfield	
33		Albert Dunstan (1882–1950); MP for Korong and Eaglehawk	1937; 1940; 1943	2 April 1935	14 September 1943	8 years, 166 days	United Country	Dunstan I	George V	Lord Huntingfield	
33		Albert Dunstan (1882–1950); MP for Korong and Eaglehawk	1937; 1940; 1943	2 April 1935	14 September 1943	8 years, 166 days	United Country	Dunstan I	Edward VIII	Lord Huntingfield	
33		Albert Dunstan (1882–1950); MP for Korong and Eaglehawk	1937; 1940; 1943	2 April 1935	14 September 1943	8 years, 166 days	United Country	Dunstan I	George VI	Lord Huntingfield	
33		Albert Dunstan (1882–1950); MP for Korong and Eaglehawk	1937; 1940; 1943	2 April 1935	14 September 1943	8 years, 166 days	United Country	Dunstan I	George VI	Lord Dugan	
34		John Cain Sr. (1882–1957); MP for Northcote	—	14 September 1943	18 September 1943	5 days	Labor	Cain Sr. I	George VI	Lord Dugan	
(33)		Albert Dunstan (1882–1950); MP for Korong and Eaglehawk	—	18 September 1943	2 October 1945	2 years, 15 days	United Country	Dunstan II	George VI	Lord Dugan	
35		Ian Macfarlan (1881–1964); MP for Brighton	—	2 October 1945	21 November 1945	51 days	Liberal	Macfarlan	George VI	Lord Dugan	
(34)		John Cain Sr. (1882–1957); MP for Northcote	1945	21 November 1945	20 November 1947	2 years, 0 days	Labor	Cain Sr. II	George VI	Lord Dugan	
36		Thomas Hollway (1906–1971); MP for Ballarat	1947; 1950	20 November 1947	27 June 1950	2 years, 220 days	Liberal; Liberal and Country	Hollway I/I; Hollway I/II; Hollway I/III	George VI	Lord Dugan	
36		Thomas Hollway (1906–1971); MP for Ballarat	1947; 1950	20 November 1947	27 June 1950	2 years, 220 days	Liberal; Liberal and Country	Hollway I/I; Hollway I/II; Hollway I/III	George VI	Dallas Brooks	
37		John McDonald (1896–1977); MP for Shepparton	—	27 June 1950	28 October 1952	2 years, 124 days	Country	McDonald I	George VI	Dallas Brooks	
37		John McDonald (1896–1977); MP for Shepparton	—	27 June 1950	28 October 1952	2 years, 124 days	Country	McDonald I	Elizabeth II	Dallas Brooks	
(36)		Thomas Hollway (1906–1971); MP for Ballarat	—	28 October 1952	31 October 1952	4 days	Electoral Reform	Hollway II	Elizabeth II	Dallas Brooks	
(37)		John McDonald (1896–1977); MP for Shepparton	—	31 October 1952	17 December 1952	48 days	Country	McDonald II	Elizabeth II	Dallas Brooks	
(34)		John Cain Sr. (1882–1957); MP for Northcote	1952	17 December 1952	7 June 1955	2 years, 173 days	Labor	Cain Sr. III	Elizabeth II	Dallas Brooks	
38		Henry Bolte (1908–1990); MP for Hampden	1955; 1958; 1961; 1964; 1967; 1970	7 June 1955	23 August 1972	17 years, 78 days	Liberal and Country; Liberal	Bolte I Bolte II; Bolte III; Bolte IV; Bolte V Bolte VI	Elizabeth II	Dallas Brooks	
38		Henry Bolte (1908–1990); MP for Hampden	1955; 1958; 1961; 1964; 1967; 1970	7 June 1955	23 August 1972	17 years, 78 days	Liberal and Country; Liberal	Bolte I Bolte II; Bolte III; Bolte IV; Bolte V Bolte VI	Elizabeth II	Rohan Delacombe	
39		Rupert Hamer (1916–2004); MP for Kew	1973; 1976; 1979	23 August 1972	5 June 1981	8 years, 287 days	Liberal	Hamer I Hamer II; Hamer III; Hamer IV	Elizabeth II	Rohan Delacombe	
39		Rupert Hamer (1916–2004); MP for Kew	1973; 1976; 1979	23 August 1972	5 June 1981	8 years, 287 days	Liberal	Hamer I Hamer II; Hamer III; Hamer IV	Elizabeth II	Henry Winneke	
40		Lindsay Thompson (1923–2008); MP for Malvern	—	5 June 1981	8 April 1982	308 days	Liberal	Thompson	Elizabeth II	Henry Winneke	
40		Lindsay Thompson (1923–2008); MP for Malvern	—	5 June 1981	8 April 1982	308 days	Liberal	Thompson	Elizabeth II	Brian Murray	
41		John Cain Jr. (1931–2019); MP for Bundoora	1982; 1985; 1988	8 April 1982	10 August 1990	8 years, 125 days	Labor	Cain Jr.	Elizabeth II	Brian Murray	
41		John Cain Jr. (1931–2019); MP for Bundoora	1982; 1985; 1988	8 April 1982	10 August 1990	8 years, 125 days	Labor	Cain Jr.	Elizabeth II	Davis McCaughey	
42		Joan Kirner (1938–2015); MP for Williamstown	—	10 August 1990	6 October 1992	2 years, 58 days	Labor	Kirner	Elizabeth II	Davis McCaughey	
42		Joan Kirner (1938–2015); MP for Williamstown	—	10 August 1990	6 October 1992	2 years, 58 days	Labor	Kirner	Elizabeth II	Richard McGarvie	
43		Jeff Kennett (b. 1948); MP for Burwood	1992; 1996	6 October 1992	20 October 1999	7 years, 15 days	Liberal	Kennett I Kennett II	Elizabeth II	Richard McGarvie	
43		Jeff Kennett (b. 1948); MP for Burwood	1992; 1996	6 October 1992	20 October 1999	7 years, 15 days	Liberal	Kennett I Kennett II	Elizabeth II	James Gobbo	
44		Steve Bracks (b. 1954); MP for Williamstown	1999; 2002; 2006	20 October 1999	30 July 2007	7 years, 284 days	Labor	Bracks I Bracks II; Bracks III	Elizabeth II	James Gobbo	
44		Steve Bracks (b. 1954); MP for Williamstown	1999; 2002; 2006	20 October 1999	30 July 2007	7 years, 284 days	Labor	Bracks I Bracks II; Bracks III	Elizabeth II	John Landy	
44		Steve Bracks (b. 1954); MP for Williamstown	1999; 2002; 2006	20 October 1999	30 July 2007	7 years, 284 days	Labor	Bracks I Bracks II; Bracks III	Elizabeth II	David de Kretser	
45		John Brumby (b. 1953); MP for Broadmeadows	—	30 July 2007	2 December 2010	3 years, 126 days	Labor	Brumby	Elizabeth II	David de Kretser	
46		Ted Baillieu (b. 1953); MP for Hawthorn	2010	2 December 2010	6 March 2013	2 years, 95 days	Liberal	Baillieu	Elizabeth II	David de Kretser	
46		Ted Baillieu (b. 1953); MP for Hawthorn	2010	2 December 2010	6 March 2013	2 years, 95 days	Liberal	Baillieu	Elizabeth II	Alex Chernov	
47		Denis Napthine (b. 1952); MP for South-West Coast	—	6 March 2013	4 December 2014	1 year, 274 days	Liberal	Napthine	Elizabeth II	Alex Chernov	
48		Daniel Andrews (b. 1972); MP for Mulgrave	2014; 2018; 2022	4 December 2014	27 September 2023	8 years, 298 days	Labor	Andrews I Andrews II; Andrews III	Elizabeth II	Alex Chernov	
48		Daniel Andrews (b. 1972); MP for Mulgrave	2014; 2018; 2022	4 December 2014	27 September 2023	8 years, 298 days	Labor	Andrews I Andrews II; Andrews III	Elizabeth II	Linda Dessau	
48		Daniel Andrews (b. 1972); MP for Mulgrave	2014; 2018; 2022	4 December 2014	27 September 2023	8 years, 298 days	Labor	Andrews I Andrews II; Andrews III	Charles III	Linda Dessau	
48		Daniel Andrews (b. 1972); MP for Mulgrave	2014; 2018; 2022	4 December 2014	27 September 2023	8 years, 298 days	Labor	Andrews I Andrews II; Andrews III	Charles III	Margaret Gardner	
49		Jacinta Allan (b. 1973); MP for Bendigo East	—	27 September 2023	28 July 2026	2 years, 305 days	Labor	Allan	Charles III	Margaret Gardner	
50		Ben Carroll (b. 1975); MP for Niddrie	—	28 July 2026	Incumbent	113 days	Labor	Carroll	Charles III	Margaret Gardner	

== See also ==
- Department of Premier and Cabinet, Victoria
- Deputy Premier of Victoria
- List of premiers of Victoria by time in office
- Longest-serving members of the Parliament of Victoria

== Sources ==
- Costar, Brian J.; Strangio, Paul (2006). The Victorian Premiers, 1856–2006. Federation Press. ISBN 1-86287-601-0. Archived from the original on 9 October 2023.
