= Lawson ministry =

41st ministry of the Government of Victoria

- 41st ministry of Victoria, Australia
- Date formed: 21 March 1918
- Date dissolved: 28 April 1924

People and organisations
- Monarch: George V
- Governor: Sir Arthur Stanley (until 30 January 1920) (Note: During the time between the end of Sir Standley's Governorship and the beginning of Lord Stradbroke's Governorship, the Acting Governor was Sir William Irvine); Lord Stradbroke (from 24 February 1921)
- Premier: Harry Lawson
- No. of ministers: 12
- Member party: Nationalist; Nationalist-Country Coalition (7 September 1923 until 19 March 1924)
- Status in legislature: Minority government
- Opposition party: Labor
- Opposition leader: George Elmslie (until 11 May 1918); George Prendergast (from 18 June 1918)

History
- Elections: 1920 state election 1921 state election
- Predecessor: Bowser ministry
- Successor: Third Peacock ministry

The Lawson Ministry was the 41st ministry of the Government of Victoria. It was led by the Premier of Victoria, Harry Lawson, and consisted of members of the Nationalist Party. The ministry was sworn in on 21 March 1918 following the resignation of John Bowser's short lived ministry. In September 1923 Lawson formed a coalition government with the Country Party. However, this coalition only lasted until March 1924, after which Lawson formed a minority Nationalist government. Shortly afterward in 1924, Lawson's government was defeated and succeeded by new Nationalist Leader Sir Alexander Peacock's government.

== Composition ==
=== 19 March 1924 - 28 April 1924 ===
Minister	Portfolio
Harry Lawson, MLA	Premier; Treasurer
Arthur Robinson, MLC	Attorney-General; Solicitor-General
Sir Alexander Peacock, MLA	Minister of Public Instruction; Minister of Labour; Minister of Forests; Vice-President of the Board of Land and Works
Stanley Argyle, MLA	Chief Secretary; Minister of Public Health
David Oman, MLA	Commissioner of Crown Lands and Survey; President of the Board of Land and Works; Minister of Immigration; Minister in charge of the Wheat Scheme
Frederic Eggleston, MLA	Minister of Railways; Vice-President of the Board of Land and Works
Henry Cohen, MLC	Commissioner of Public Works; Vice-President of the Board of Land and Works
John Gordon, MLA	Minister of Agriculture; Minister of Water Supply; Vice-President of the Board of Land and Works
Frederick Brawn, MLC	Minister without portfolio
Martin McGregor, MLC	Minister without portfolio
Frank Groves, MLA	Minister without portfolio
Henry Beardmore, MLA	Minister without portfolio

=== 7 September 1923 - 19 March 1924 ===
Party	Minister	Portfolio
Nationalist	Harry Lawson, MLA	Premier; Minister of Water Supply (until 27 February 1924); Minister in charge of the Wheat Scheme; Treasurer (from 27 February 1924)
Country	John Allan, MLA	Commissioner of Crown Lands and Survey; President of the Board of Land and Works; Minister of Immigration
Nationalist	William McPherson, MLA (until 20 November 1923)	Treasurer
Nationalist	Arthur Robinson, MLC	Attorney-General; Solicitor-General
Nationalist	Sir Alexander Peacock, MLA	Minister of Public Instruction; Minister of Labour; Minister of Forests; Vice-President of the Board of Land and Works
Nationalist	Stanley Argyle, MLA	Chief Secretary; Minister of Public Health
Country	Francis Old, MLA	Minister of Agriculture; Minister of Railways; Vice-President of the Board of Land and Works
Country	George Goudie, MLC	Commissioner of Public Works; Minister of Mines; Vice-President of the Board of Land and Works
Nationalist	Frederic Eggleston, MLA	Minister of Water Supply
Nationalist	Henry Cohen, MLC	Minister without portfolio
Nationalist	John Gordon, MLA	Minister without portfolio
Nationalist	Marcus Wettenhall, MLA	Minister without portfolio
Country	William Corckett, MLC	Minister without portfolio

=== 21 March 1918 - 7 September 1923 ===
Minister	Portfolio
Harry Lawson, MLA	Premier; Minister of Labour (until 7 July 1919); Attorney-General (until 21 October 1919); Commissioner of Crown Lands and Survey (21 October 1919 until 4 November 1920); President of the Board of Land and Works (21 October 1919 until 4 November 1920); Solicitor-General (20 January 1920 until 20 September 1920); Minister of Agriculture (from 4 November 1920); Minister of Water Supply (from 22 February 1921)
John Bowser, MLA (until 7 July 1919)	Chief Secretary; Minister of Public Health
William McPherson, MLA	Treasurer
Arthur Robinson, MLC	Solicitor-General (until 20 January 1920; from 20 September 1920); Commissioner of Public Works (until 21 October 1921); Vice-President of the Board of Land and Works (until 21 October 1921); Attorney-General (from 21 October 1921)
William Hutchinson, MLA (until 1 November 1920)	Minister of Public Instruction; Minister of Forests; Vice-President of the Board of Land and Works
Frank Clarke, MLC	Commissioner of Crown Lands and Survey (until 21 October 1919); President of the Board of Land and Works (until 21 October 1919); Minister of Water Supply (until 22 February 1921); Commissioner of Public Works (from 21 October 1919); Vice-President of the Board of Land and Works (from 21 October 1919)
Samuel Barnes, MLA	Minister of Railways; Minister of Mines; Vice-President of the Board of Land and Works
David Oman, MLA	Minister of Agriculture (until 4 November 1920); Commissioner of Crown Lands and Survey (from 4 November 1920); President of the Board of Land and Works (from 4 November 1920); Minister of Immigration (from 8 May 1923)
Matthew Baird, MLA (from 7 July 1919)	Chief Secretary; Minister of Public Health; Minister of Labour (until 4 November 1920
Sir Alexander Peacock, MLA (from 4 November 1920)	Minister of Public Instruction; Minister of Labour; Minister of Forests; Vice-President of the Board of Land and Works
Andrew Robertson, MLA (until 14 April 1919)	Minister without portfolio
John McWhae, MLC	Minister without portfolio
William Kendell, MLC (until 18 May 1920)	Minister without portfolio
Hugh Campbell, MLA (until 4 November 1920)	Minister without portfolio
Henry Angus, MLA (from 4 November 1920)	Minister without portfolio
John Pennington, MLA (from 4 November 1920)	Minister without portfolio
James Merritt, MLC (from 17 January 1922)	Minister without portfolio
George Davis, MLC (from 17 January 1922)	Minister without portfolio

== Notes ==
Parliament of Victoria
Preceded by Bowser ministry	Lawson Ministry; 1918-1924	Succeeded by Third Peacock ministry
