= Third Peacock ministry =

42nd ministry of the Government of Victoria

- 42nd ministry of Victoria, Australia
- Date formed: 28 April 1924
- Date dissolved: 18 July 1924

People and organisations
- Monarch: George V
- Governor: Lord Stradbroke
- Premier: Sir Alexander Peacock
- No. of ministers: 10
- Member party: Nationalist
- Status in legislature: Minority government
- Opposition party: Labor
- Opposition leader: George Prendergast

History
- Predecessor: Lawson ministry
- Successor: Prendergast ministry

The Third Peacock Ministry was the 42nd ministry of the Government of Victoria. It was led by the Premier of Victoria, Sir Alexander Peacock, and consisted of members of the Nationalist Party. The ministry was sworn in on 28 April 1924 following Peacock becoming leader of the Nationalist Party after the collapse of the Nationalist-Country Coalition government led by Harry Lawson. The ministry dissolved following the Nationalist Party's loss at the 1924 state election and was succeeded by George Prendergast's Labor government.

Minister	Portfolio
Sir Alexander Peacock, MLA	Premier; Treasurer; Minister of Labour
Arthur Robinson, MLC (to 11 July 1924)	Attorney-General; Solicitor-General
Stanley Argyle, MLA	Chief Secretary; Minister of Public Health
David Oman, MLA	Commissioner of Crown Lands and Survey; President of the Board of Land and Works; Minister of Immigration; Minister in charge of the Wheat Scheme
Frederic Eggleston, MLA	Minister of Railways; Vice-President of the Board of Land and Works
Henry Cohen, MLC	Commissioner of Public Works; Minister of Mines; Vice-President of the Board of Land and Works; Attorney-General (from 11 July 1924); Solicitor-General (from 11 July 1924)
John Gordon, MLA	Minister of Agriculture; Minister of Water Supply; Vice-President of the Board of Land and Works
Richard Toutcher, MLA	Minister of Public Instruction; Minister of Forests; Vice-President of the Board of Land and Works
Martin McGregor, MLC	Minister without portfolio
Frank Groves, MLA	Minister without portfolio
Henry Beardmore, MLA	Minister without portfolio

Parliament of Victoria
Preceded by Lawson Ministry	Third Peacock Ministry; 1924-1924	Succeeded by Prendergast Ministry
