= Second Peacock ministry =

39th ministry of the Government of Victoria

- 39th ministry of Victoria, Australia
- Date formed: 18 June 1914
- Date dissolved: 29 November 1917

People and organisations
- Monarch: George V
- Governor: Sir Arthur Stanley
- Premier: Sir Alexander Peacock
- No. of ministers: 11
- Member party: Commonwealth Liberal Party (until 1917); Nationalist (from 1917)
- Status in legislature: Majority government
- Opposition party: Labor
- Opposition leader: George Elmslie

History
- Election: 1914 state election
- Predecessor: Second Watt ministry
- Successor: Bowser ministry

The Second Peacock Ministry was the 39th ministry of the Government of Victoria. It was led by the premier of Victoria, Alexander Peacock, and consisted of members of the Commonwealth Liberal Party, later known as the Nationalist Party. The ministry was sworn in on 18 June 1914 following the resignation of Premier William Watt to contest the 1914 federal election. The government was defeated at the 1917 state election by the anti-Peacock faction of the Nationalist party and succeeded by the Bowser ministry.

== Composition ==
Minister	Portfolio
Sir Alexander Peacock, MLA	Premier; Treasurer; Minister for Labour (except 10 Aug to 9 Nov 1915)
John Murray, MLA (until 9 Nov 1915)	Chief Secretary (until 9 Nov 1915); Minister for Labour (10 Aug to 9 Nov 1915)
Donald Mackinnon, MLA (until 9 Nov 1915)	Attorney-General (until 9 Nov 1915); Solicitor-General (until 9 Nov 1915); Minister of Railways (until 9 Nov 1915); Vice-President of the Board of Land and Works (until 9 Nov 1915)
James Drysdale Brown, MLC (until 9 Nov 1915)	Minister of Mines (until 9 Nov 1915); Minister of Forests (until 9 Nov 1915); Minister of Public Health (until 9 Nov 1915); Vice-President of the Board of Land and Works (until 9 Nov 1915)
Frederick Hagelthorn, MLC	Commissioner of Public Works; Vice-President of the Board of Land and Works
Harry Lawson, MLA	Commissioner of Crown Lands and Survey (until 9 Nov 1915); President of the Board of Land and Works (until 9 Nov 1915); Attorney-General (from 9 Nov 1915); Solicitor-General (from 9 Nov 1915); Minister of Public Instruction (from 9 Nov 1915)
William Hutchinson, MLA	Minister of Water Supply (until 9 Nov 1915); Minister for Agriculture (until 9 Nov 1915); Commissioner of Crown Lands and Survey (from 9 Nov 1915); President of the Board of Land and Works (from 9 Nov 1915)
Thomas Livingston, MLA	Minister of Public Instruction (until 9 Nov 1915); Minister of Mines (from 9 Nov 1915); Minister of Forests (from 9 Nov 1915); Vice-President of the Board of Land and Works (from 9 Nov 1915)
Hugh McKenzie, MLA (from 9 Nov 1915)	Minister of Railways (from 9 Nov 1915); Vice-President of the Board of Land and Works (from 9 Nov 1915); Minister of Water Supply (from 9 Nov 1915)
Donald McLeod, MLA (from 9 Nov 1915)	Chief Secretary (from 9 Nov 1915); Minister of Public Health (from 9 Nov 1915)
John Gray, MLA	Minister without office
Robert McCutcheon, MLA (9 Nov 1915 - 10 Nov 1916)	Minister without office
James Membrey, MLA (from 9 Nov 1915)	Minister without office
Arthur Robinson, MLC (from 9 Nov 1915)	Minister without office
Samuel Barnes, MLA (from 18 Sep 1917)	Minister without office

Parliament of Victoria
Preceded by Second Watt ministry	Second Peacock Ministry; 1914-1917	Succeeded by Bowser ministry
