= Prendergast ministry =

43rd ministry of Victoria, Australia

- 43rd ministry of Victoria, Australia
- Date formed: 18 July 1924
- Date dissolved: 12 November 1924

People and organisations
- Monarch: George V
- Governor: Lord Stradbroke
- Premier: George Prendergast
- No. of ministers: 11
- Member party: Labor
- Status in legislature: Minority government
- Opposition party: Nationalist
- Opposition leader: Alexander Peacock

History
- Election: 1924 state election
- Predecessor: Third Peacock ministry
- Successor: Allan ministry

The Prendergast Ministry was the 43rd ministry of the Government of Victoria. It was led by the Premier of Victoria, George Prendergast, of the Labor Party. The ministry was sworn in on 18 July 1924. On 12 November 1924, a motion of no-confidence in the Prendergast government was proposed in the Legislative Assembly by John Allan, leader of the Country Party—the motion was carried 34 votes to 28, defeating the government. Allan and his ministry were sworn in on 18 November.

== Portfolios ==
Minister	Portfolios
George Prendergast, MLA	Premier; Treasurer
Tom Tunnecliffe, MLA	Chief Secretary
John Lemmon, MLA	Minister of Education; Minister of Labour
Edmond Hogan, MLA	Minister of Agriculture; Minister of Railways; Vice-President of the Board of Land and Works
Henry Bailey, MLA	President of the Board of Land and Works; Commissioner of Crown Lands and Survey; Minister of Water Supply; Minister of Markets (from 28 July 1924)
William Slater, MLA	Attorney-General; Solicitor-General
John Jones, MLC	Commissioner of Public Works; Minister of Public Health; Minister in Charge of Immigration; Vice-President of the Board of Land and Works
Daniel McNamara, MLC	Minister of Mines; Minister of Forests; Vice-President of the Board of Land and Works
James Disney, MLC	Ministers without Portfolio
John Cain, MLA	Ministers without Portfolio
Gordon Webber, MLA	Ministers without Portfolio
William Beckett, MLC	Ministers without Portfolio

Parliament of Victoria
Preceded by Third Peacock Ministry	Prendergast Ministry; 1924	Succeeded by Allan ministry
