= John Allan ministry =

44th ministry of Victoria, Australia

Allan ministry
- 44th ministry of Victoria, Australia
- Date formed: 18 November 1924
- Date dissolved: 20 May 1927

People and organisations
- Monarch: George V
- Governor: Lord Stradbroke (until 7 April 1926); Lord Somers (from 28 June 1926) (Note: During the time between Lord Stradbroke's governorship ending and Lord Somers being appointed, the Governor was Lieutenant-Governor William Irvine)
- Premier: John Allan
- No. of ministers: 10
- Member party: Country-Nationalist Coalition
- Status in legislature: Minority government
- Opposition party: Labor
- Opposition leader: George Prendergast (until 14 April 1926); Edmond Hogan (from 14 April 1926)

History
- Predecessor: Prendergast ministry
- Successor: First Hogan ministry

The Allan Ministry was the 44th ministry of the Government of Victoria. It was led by the Premier of Victoria, John Allan, and was formed by a coalition of the Country and Nationalist parties. The ministry was sworn in on 18 November 1924.

== Portfolios ==
Party	Minister	Portfolios
Country	John Allan, MLA	Premier; Attorney-General (from 28 April 1927); Solicitor-General (from 28 April 1927)
Country	Sir Alexander Peacock, MLA	Treasurer; Minister of Public Instruction; Minister for Labour
Nationalist	Stanley Argyle, MLA	Chief Secretary; Minister of Public Health
Nationalist	Frederic Eggleston, MLA	Attorney-General (until 28 April 1927); Solicitor-General (until 28 April 1927); Minister for Railways; Vice-President of the Board of Land and Works
Country	Alfred Downward, MLA	Commissioner of Crown Lands and Survey; President of the Board of Land and Works; Minister of Immigration
Nationalist	Horace Richardson, MLC	Minister of Forests; Vice-President of the Board of Land and Works
Country	George Goudie, MLC	Commissioner of Public Works; Minister of Mines; Vice-President of the Board of Land and Works
Country	Murray Bourchier, MLA	Minister for Agriculture; Minister of Markets
Nationalist	James McDonald, MLA	Ministers without Portfolio
Country	William Crockett, MLC	Ministers without Portfolio
Nationalist	Martin McGregor, MLC	Ministers without Portfolio
Country	Edwin Mackrell, MLA	Ministers without Portfolio

== Notes ==
Parliament of Victoria
Preceded by Prendergast Ministry	Allan-Peacock Ministry; 1924–1927	Succeeded by First Hogan Ministry
