= Bowser ministry (Victoria) =

40th ministry of the Government of Victoria

- 40th ministry of Victoria, Australia
- Date formed: 29 November 1917
- Date dissolved: 21 March 1918

People and organisations
- Monarch: George V
- Governor: Sir Arthur Stanley
- Premier: John Bowser
- No. of ministers: 12
- Member party: Nationalist
- Status in legislature: Majority government
- Opposition party: Labor
- Opposition leader: George Elmslie

History
- Election: 1917 state election
- Predecessor: Second Peacock ministry
- Successor: Lawson ministry

The Bowser Ministry was the 40th ministry of the Government of Victoria. It was led by the premier of Victoria, John Bowser, and consisted of members of the Nationalist Party. The ministry was sworn in on 29 November 1917 following the party's victory in the 1917 state election. The Bowser government was defeated in 1918 and succeeded by the Lawson ministry in which Bowser held cabinet positions.

== Composition ==
Minister	Portfolio
John Bowser, MLA	Premier; Chief Secretary; Minister for Labour
Agar Wynne, MLA	Attorney-General; Solicitor-General; Minister of Railways; Vice-President of the Board of Land and Works
William McPherson, MLA	Treasurer
Alfred Downward, MLA	Minister of Mines; Minister of Forests; Minister of Public Health; Vice-President of the Board of Land and Works
Frank Clarke, MLC	Commissioner of Crown Lands and Survey; President of the Board of Land and Works; Minister of Water Supply
Matthew Baird, MLA	Minister of Public Instruction
John McWhae, MLC	Commissioner of Public Works; Vice-President of the Board of Land and Works
David Oman, MLA	Minister for Agriculture
William Kendell, MLC	Minister without office
Horace Richardson, MLC	Minister without office
Henry Angus, MLA	Minister without office
John Carlisle, MLA	Minister without office

Parliament of Victoria
Preceded by Second Peacock ministry	Bowser Ministry; 1917-1918	Succeeded by Lawson ministry
