= First Hogan ministry =

45th ministry of Victoria, Australia

First Cain ministry
- 45th ministry of Victoria, Australia
- Date formed: 20 May 1927
- Date dissolved: 22 November 1928

People and organisations
- Monarch: George V
- Governor: Lord Somers
- Premier: Edmond Hogan
- No. of ministers: 12
- Member party: Labor
- Status in legislature: Minority government
- Opposition party: Nationalist
- Opposition leader: Sir William McPherson

History
- Election: 1927 state election
- Predecessor: Allan ministry
- Successor: McPherson ministry

The First Hogan Ministry was the 45th ministry of the Government of Victoria. It was led by the Premier of Victoria, Edmond Hogan, and consisted of members of the Labor Party. The ministry was sworn in on 20 May 1927.

== Portfolios ==
Minister	Portfolios
Edmond Hogan, MLA	Premier; Treasurer; Minister of Markets
Tom Tunnecliffe, MLA	Minister of Railways; Minister in Charge of Electrical Undertakings; Vice-President of the Board of Land and Works
John Lemmon, MLA	Minister of Public Instruction; Minister of Labour
Henry Bailey, MLA	President of the Board of Land and Works; Commissioner of Crown Lands and Survey; Minister of Water Supply
George Prendergast, MLA	Chief Secretary
Bill Slater, MLA	Attorney-General; Solicitor-General; Minister for Agriculture
John Jones, MLC	Commissioner of Public Works; Minister of Mines; Minister in Charge of Immigration; Vice-President of the Board of Land and Works
William Beckett, MLC	Minister of Forests; Minister of Public Health; Vice-President of the Board of Land and Works
James Disney, MLC	Ministers without Portfolio
Robert Williams, MLC	Ministers without Portfolio
John Cain, MLA	Ministers without Portfolio
Gordon Webber, MLA	Ministers without Portfolio

Parliament of Victoria
Preceded by Allan ministry	First Hogan Ministry; 1927–1928	Succeeded by McPherson Ministry
