= McPherson ministry =

46th ministry of Victoria, Australia

- 46th ministry of Victoria, Australia
- Date formed: 22 November 1928
- Date dissolved: 12 December 1929

People and organisations
- Monarch: George V
- Governor: Lord Somers
- Premier: Sir William McPherson
- No. of ministers: 14
- Member party: Nationalist
- Status in legislature: Minority government
- Opposition party: Labor
- Opposition leader: Edmond Hogan

History
- Predecessor: First Hogan ministry
- Successor: Second Hogan ministry

The McPherson Ministry was the 46th ministry of the Government of Victoria. It was led by the Premier of Victoria, Sir William McPherson, and consisted of members of the Nationalist Party. The ministry was sworn in on 27 November 1928.

Minister	Portfolio
Sir William McPherson, MLA	Premier; Treasurer
Stanley Argyle, MLA	Chief Secretary; Minister of Public Health
Harold Cohen, MLC	Minister of Public Instruction
Henry Angus, MLA	President of the Board of Land and Works; Commissioner of Crown Lands and Survey; Minister of Water Supply.
John Pennington, MLA	Minister of Forests; Minister of Agriculture; Minister of Markets and Immigration; Vice-President of the Board of Land and Works
Frank Groves, MLA (until 10 December 1929)	Minister of Railways; Minister in Charge of Electrical Undertakings; Minister of Labour; Vice-President of the Board of Land and Works
Alfred Chandler, MLC	Commissioner of Public Works; Minister of Mines; Vice-President of the Board of Land and Works
Ian Macfarlan, MLA	Attorney-General; Solicitor-General
Henry Beardmore, MLA (from 18 June 1929)	Minister without Portfolio (until 10 December 1929); Minister of Railways (from 10 December 1929); Minister in Charge of Electrical Undertakings (from 10 December 1929); Minister of Labour (from 10 December 1929); Vice-President of the Board of Land and Works (from 10 December 1929)
Marcus Saltau, MLC	Ministers without Portfolio
Robert Menzies, MLC	Ministers without Portfolio
Edward Morley, MLA	Ministers without Portfolio
Robert Cuthbertson, MLA	Ministers without Portfolio
Frederick Brawn, MLC (from 3 July 1929)	Ministers without Portfolio
Henry Currie, MLC (from 3 July 1929)	Ministers without Portfolio

Parliament of Victoria
Preceded by First Hogan Ministry	McPherson Ministry; 1928-1929	Succeeded by Second Hogan Ministry
