= Second Hogan ministry =

47th ministry of Victoria, Australia

- 47th ministry of Victoria, Australia
- Date formed: 12 December 1929
- Date dissolved: 19 May 1932

People and organisations
- Monarch: George V
- Governor: Lord Somers (until 23 June 1931) (Note: After this date the Acting Governor was Lieutenant-Governor Sir William Irvine)
- Premier: Edmond Hogan
- No. of ministers: 11
- Member party: Labor
- Status in legislature: Minority government
- Opposition party: Nationalist (until April 1931); United Australia (from April 1931) (Note: In April 1931, the Nationalist Party became the United Australia Party)
- Opposition leader: William McPerson (until 3 September 1930); Stanley Argyle (from 3 September 1930)

History
- Election: 1929 state election
- Predecessor: McPherson ministry
- Successor: Argyle ministry

The Second Hogan Ministry was the 47th ministry of the Government of Victoria. It was led by the Premier of Victoria, Edmond Hogan, and consisted of members of the Labor Party. The ministry was sworn in on 12 December 1929.

Minister	Portfolio
Edmond Hogan, MLA	Premier; Treasurer; Minister of Markets
Thomas Tunneclife, MLA	Chief Secretary
John Lemmon, MLA	Minister of Public Instruction; Minister of Labour (until 1 March 1932)
Henry Bailey, MLA	President of the Board of Land and Works; Commissioner of Crown Lands and Survey; Mininster of Water Supply
William Slater, MLA	Minister of Agriculture; Attorney-General; Solicitor-General
John Cain, MLA	Minister of Railways; Minister in Charge of Electrical Undertakings; Vice-President of the Board of Land and Works
John Jones, MLC (until 26 April 1932)	Commissioner of Public Works; Minister of Mines; Minister in Charge of Immigration; Vice-President of the Board of Land and Works
William Beckett, MLC (until 24 June 1931)	Minister of Forests; Minister of Public Health; Vice-President of the Board of Land and Works
Robert Williams, MLC	Minister without Portfolio (until 24 June 1931); Minister of Forests (from 24 June 1931); Minister of Public Health (from 24 June 1931); Vice-President of the Board of Land and Works (from 24 June 1931); Minister of Labour (from 1 March 1932); Commissioner of Public Works (from 26 April 1932); Minister of Mines (from 26 April 1932); Minister in Charge of Immigration (from 26 April 1932)
Esmond Kiernan, MLC	Ministers without Portfolio
Gordon Webber, MLA	Ministers without Portfolio
Reginald Polland, MLA	Ministers without Portfolio
Daniel McNamara, MLC	Ministers without Portfolio

== Notes ==
Parliament of Victoria
Preceded by McPherson Ministry	Second Hogan Ministry; 1929-1932	Succeeded by Argyle Ministry
