= George Elmslie =

George Elmslie may refer to:

- George Grant Elmslie (1869–1952), Scottish-born American architect
- George Elmslie (politician) (1861–1918), Australian politician
