= John McIntyre (politician) =

Australian politician

Sir John McIntyre
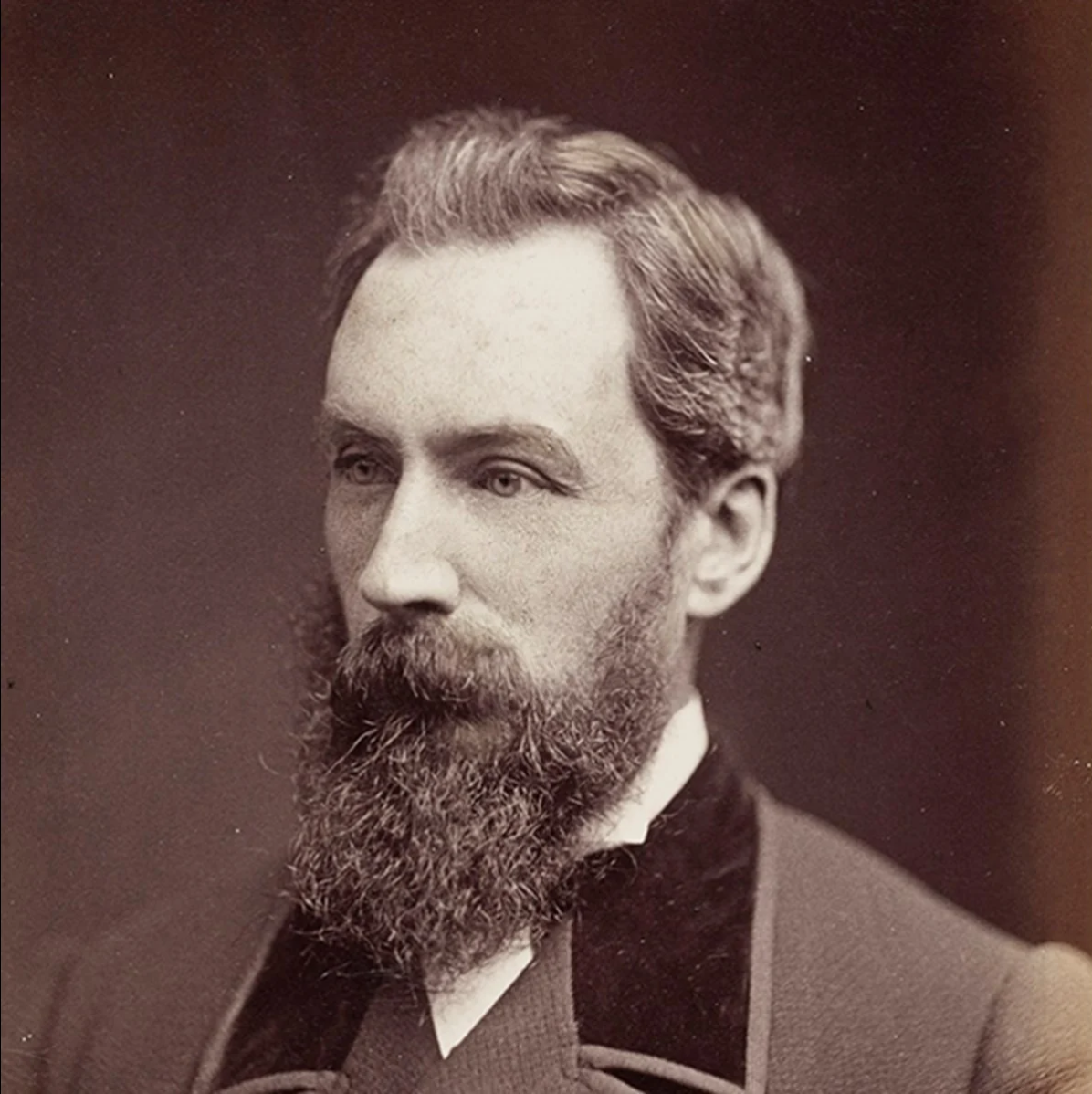

Chairman of the Sandhurst Municipal Council
- In office 1863–1868
- Preceded by: Robert Burrowes
- Succeeded by: John Holmes

Commissioner of Crown Lands and Survey
- In office 23 January 1893 – 27 September 1894
- Preceded by: Allan McLean
- Succeeded by: Robert Best

Member of the Victorian Legislative Assembly for Maldon
- In office 1 March 1881 – 1 September 1902
- Preceded by: James Service
- Succeeded by: William Wallace

Member of the Victorian Legislative Assembly for Sandhurst
- In office 1 May 1877 – 1 June 1880

Personal details
- Born: John McIntyre; 24 April 1832 Glasgow, Lanarkshire, Scotland
- Died: 18 January 1904 (aged 71) Brighton, Victoria, Australia
- Occupation: Politician, businessman

Sir John McIntyre (24 April 1832 – 18 January 1904) was a Scottish-born Australian politician and businessman. After emigrating to Australia during the Victorian gold rush, McIntyre became heavily involved in the mining industry around Bendigo in Victoria. Later as he began to rise in prominence he became involved in local politics, eventually becoming the first mayor of Bendigo, a post he held for five years before resigning. In the years following he became heavily involved in community work, serving as a territorial magistrate and children's guardian for the Bendigo district. In 1877 he was elected to the Victorian Parliament as the Member for Sandhurst. Although he later lost this seat in 1880, he re-entered parliament in 1881 after winning the seat of Maldon in a by-election. He held this seat until 1902, serving as a minister during James Patterson's premiership and as Leader of the Opposition from 1895 to 1898. In December 1903 he stood for the Australian Senate but narrowly failed to win a seat. Suffering from ill health, he died shortly afterwards.

== Early and personal life ==
McIntyre was born in Glasgow, Lanarkshire, Scotland on 24 April 1832. He was the son of Malcolm McIntyre and his wife, Euphemia McGuinness. Educated at South End Academy, he began a medical course at the University of Glasgow but did not complete it, deciding instead to emigrate to Australia in 1852. In 1853 he married Jeanne Grant, sister-in-law of Dr James Eadie, his business partner. She died in 1861, leaving three sons—Alexander, John and James. In 1875 McIntyre married Jeanne's sister, Isabella, who died in 1902.

== Mining and business interests in Victoria ==
McIntyre came to Australia after reports of significant gold discoveries and in 1852 he arrived at Portland, Victoria aboard the Runnymede. He travelled to the Bendigo fields by foot and after some early success on some mining claims he settled at Bendigo where, in 1855, he set up a business partnership with Dr James Eadie (a colleague from Glasgow) involving an apothecary and other business pursuits. His ongoing involvement in mining led to McIntyre becoming involved in advocacy of miners' rights and he was a supporter of the Red Ribbon Rebellion.

In 1856 he was elected to the Sandhurst Court which dealt with mining matters and in 1858 to its successor, the mining board of which he became chairman. His success in mining led him to pursue investment of foreign capital for Victorian mines. In 1887 he formed a company in London in order to introduce British capital into the Maldon mines.

== Political career ==
In 1859 McIntyre was elected to the Sandhurst Municipal Council. This start in politics did not eventuate as he travelled to Europe with his family. He returned in 1862 and rejoined the council, becoming chairman in 1863 and then, when Sandhurst became Bendigo, its first mayor, resigning in 1868.

McIntyre tried several times to enter the Parliament of Victoria, unsuccessfully contesting Mandurang in 1866 and Sandhurst in 1871 and 1874. In 1877 he stood again and won the seat of Sandhurst. As a noted free trader, he actively opposed Protectionism which contributed to loss of his seat in June 1880, but early in 1881 he won Maldon in the by-election following James Service's resignation from the seat.

During 1893–94 McIntyre served as President of the Board of Lands and Works and Commissioner of Crown Lands and Survey in the government of Sir James Brown Patterson. He also served as a member of the royal commissions on tariffs in 1881 and gold-mining in 1889 and was a member of the railway standing committee in 1890. Following the death of Patterson, he was elected Leader of the Opposition at a meeting on 7 November 1895, a position he held until resigning on 31 August 1898 when the position passed to Duncan Gillies. He represented the Victorian Parliament at the opening of Federal Parliament on 9 May 1901 and was presented with a Gold Commonwealth medal. In September 1902, however, he lost his seat.

McIntyre made one campaign for election as a Victorian Free Trade Party Senate candidate to the Parliament of Australia in December 1903, but he was not successful, missing out on a seat under by 600 votes.

== Community service ==
In Bendigo, McIntyre took a special interest in the local hospital, serving as honorary secretary and later as a trustee. He also served as a territorial magistrate and a children's guardian for the Bendigo district.

McIntyre involved himself in many aspects of the expatriate Scot. He held the position of President of the Royal Caledonian Society of Melbourne from 1896–98. He was a founder and honorary colonel of the Victorian Scottish Regiment.

McIntyre's health broke down after his exhausting but ultimately unsuccessful Senate campaign. However, in this period, he still found time for involvement in "things Scottish", playing the role of Bailie Nicol Jarvie in the Royal Caledonian Society's October 1903 production of "Rob Roy". He died on 18 January 1904 and was buried at the Back Creek cemetery in Bendigo.

John McIntyre was Knighted in 1895.
