= James Sullivan (Victorian politician) =

Australian politician in Victoria (1817–1876)

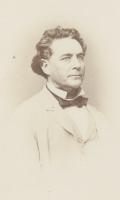
Portrait of James Forester Sullivan

James Forester Sullivan (1817–1876) was born in Ireland and served as a member of the Victorian Legislative Assembly in Australia. He was the member for Collingwood between 1 May 1874 and 1 February 1876 then the member for Mandurang between 1 May 1861 1 January 1871.

In parliament he served as Commissioner of Roads and Railways, Commissioner of Trade and Customs, Minister of Mines, and Vice-President of the Board of Land and Works.

Sullivan died in Melbourne on 3 February 1876.
