= Commissioner of Crown Lands and Survey =

Former cabinet position in Victoria, Australia

Commissioner of Crown Lands and Survey of Victoria
- Victorian coat of arms

- Flag of Victoria
- Department of Crown Lands and Survey
- Style: The Honourable
- Member of: Parliament; Cabinet
- Reports to: Premier
- Nominator: Premier
- Appointer: Governor on the recommendation of the premier
- Term length: At the governor's pleasure
- Inaugural holder: George Horne MP
- Formation: 11 March 1857
- Final holder: Keith Turnbull MP
- Abolished: 27 June 1964

The Commissioner of Crown Lands and Survey was a ministerial portfolio in Victoria, Australia.

== History ==
In 1857 the Board of Land and Works was established because it was considered that the administration of public lands and public works would be more effectually and economically managed if it were consolidated and placed under one head. By Letters Patent of 28 April 1857, the positions of Commissioner of Crown Lands and Survey (previously Surveyor-General) and Commissioner of Public Works were abolished and the powers previously exercised by the Commissioners were vested in the Board of Land and Works . The departments of the Civil Service previously under the Commissioners' control effectively became sub-departments of the Board. While there was clearly an intent to achieve consolidation, the extent to which the sub-departments were administratively integrated following the establishment of the Board in 1857 is uncertain and from late 1858 and the reappointment of a Commissioner of Crown Lands and Survey and a Commissioner of Public Works, the sub-departments were clearly administratively separate.

Although a Commissioner of Crown Lands and Survey had been reappointed to the Ministry in 1858, statutory authority for lands matters continued to be vested in the Board until its abolition in 1964.

=== Surveying ===
By 1855, the Geological Survey had been associated with the administration of public lands and in 1857, following the establishment of the Board of Land and Works, this arrangement continued. By 1858 however responsibility for the geological survey had been transferred to the Chief Secretary's Department where it remained until 1861, despite the recommendation of the Civil Service Commission of 1859-60 that it be transferred to the department of the Commissioner of Crown Lands and Survey. In 1861 responsibility for the geological survey was assumed by the Commissioner of Mines and the newly established Department of Mines.

=== Immigration ===
Assisted immigration was frequently associated with land settlement in Victoria and by 1906 the Commissioner of Crown Lands and Survey had become responsible for immigration in connection with land settlement and the augmenting of the labour force. By 1912 an Immigration and Labour Bureau had been established within the Department of Crown Lands and Survey.

=== Cemeteries ===
By 1864 and until August 1873, the Commissioner of Public Works and the Public Works Department were responsible for the administration of cemeteries including the appointment of trustees and approval of regulations and fees. From 1873 until 1888 the Commissioner of Crown Lands and Survey and the Department of Crown Lands and Survey were responsible and in 1888 the Chief Secretary and the Chief Secretary's Department assumed responsibility. The Public Works Department however continued to be responsible for the allocation of fencing grants.

=== Abolition ===
In 1983 the Department of Conservation, Forests and Lands was established. The establishment of this Department reflected the Government's intention to consolidate the administration of all public lands matters in the one Department; to co-ordinate the use of land resources; to rationalise the many different local land management systems and authorities and to better co-ordinate the management of public lands with conservation requirements.

The new department assumed responsibility for all matters relating to survey and mapping, crown lands administration and the Royal Botanic Gardens and National Herbarium from the Department of Crown Lands and Survey.

== Commissioners ==
Order	MP	Party affiliation	Term start	Term end	Time in office	Notes
	George Horne MP		11 March 1857	29 April 1857	49 days	
	Charles Gavan Duffy MP		21 December 1858	22 March 1859	91 days	
	George Evans MP		22 March 1859	27 October 1859	219 days	
	James Service MP		27 October 1859	3 September 1860	312 days	
	Vincent Pyke MP		3 September 1860	24 September 1860	21 days	
	Augustus Greeves MP		24 September 1860	26 November 1860	63 days	
	John Henry Brooke MP		26 November 1860	14 November 1861	353 days	
	Charles Gavan Duffy MP		14 November 1861	27 June 1863	1 year, 225 days	
	Richard Heales MP		27 June 1863	19 June 1864	358 days	
	James Macpherson Grant MP		5 September 1864	6 May 1868	3 years, 244 days	
	Duncan Gillies MP		6 May 1868	11 July 1868	66 days	
	James Macpherson Grant MP		11 July 1868	20 September 1869	1 year, 71 days	
	James McKean MP		20 September 1869	9 April 1870	201 days	
	John Alexander MacPherson MP		9 April 1870	19 June 1871	1 year, 71 days	
	James Macpherson Grant MLC		19 June 1871	10 June 1872	357 days	
	James Casey MP		10 June 1872	7 August 1875	3 years, 58 days	
	Duncan Gillies MP		20 October 1875	21 May 1877	1 year, 213 days	
	John Gavan Duffy MP		5 March 1880	3 August 1880	151 days	
	Richard Richardson MP		3 August 1880	9 July 1881	340 days	
	David Gaunson MP		9 July 1881	2 August 1881	24 days	
	Walter Madden MP		19 August 1881	8 March 1883	1 year, 201 days	
	Albert Tucker MP		8 March 1883	18 February 1886	2 years, 347 days	
	John Dow MP		18 February 1886	5 November 1890	4 years, 260 days	
	Allan McLean MP		5 November 1890	23 January 1893	2 years, 79 days	
	John McIntyre MP		23 January 1893	27 September 1894	1 year, 247 days	
	Robert Best MP		27 September 1894	5 December 1899	5 years, 69 days	
	James McColl MP		5 December 1899	19 November 1900	349 days	
	Daniel Joseph Duggan MP		19 November 1900	10 June 1902	1 year, 203 days	
	Malcolm McKenzie MP	Reform	10 June 1902	28 January 1903	232 days	
	John William Taverner MP	Reform	6 February 1903	19 February 1904	1 year, 13 days	
	John Murray MP	Reform	19 February 1904	15 August 1906	2 years, 177 days	
	John Mackey MP	Reform	15 August 1906	31 October 1908	2 years, 77 days	
	Thomas Hunt MP	Reform	31 October 1908	8 January 1909	69 days	
	Hugh McKenzie MP	Liberal	8 January 1909	9 December 1913	4 years, 335 days	
	William Plain MP	Labor	9 December 1913	22 December 1913	13 days	
	Harry Lawson MP	Liberal	22 December 1913	9 November 1915	1 year, 322 days	
	William Hutchinson MP	Liberal	9 November 1915	29 November 1917	2 years, 20 days	
	Frank Clarke MLC	Nationalist	29 November 1917	21 October 1919	1 year, 326 days	
	Harry Lawson MP	Nationalist	21 October 1919	4 November 1920	1 year, 14 days	
	David Oman MP	Nationalist	4 November 1920	7 September 1923	2 years, 307 days	
	John Allan MP	Nationalist	7 September 1923	19 March 1924	194 days	
	David Oman MP	Nationalist	19 March 1924	18 July 1924	121 days	
	Henry Bailey MP	Labor	18 July 1924	18 November 1924	123 days	
	Alfred Downward MP	Country	18 November 1924	20 May 1927	2 years, 183 days	
	Henry Bailey MP	Labor	20 May 1927	22 November 1928	1 year, 186 days	
	Henry Angus MP	Nationalist	22 November 1928	12 December 1929	1 year, 20 days	
	Henry Bailey MP	Labor	12 December 1929	19 May 1932	2 years, 159 days	
	Albert Dunstan MP	United Australia	19 May 1932	20 March 1935	2 years, 305 days	
	Thomas Maltby MP	United Australia	20 March 1935	2 April 1935	13 days	
	Albert Lind MP	United Country	2 April 1935	1 January 1942	6 years, 274 days	
	George Tuckett MLC	United Country	8 January 1942	14 September 1943	1 year, 249 days	
	Daniel McNamara MLC	Labor	14 September 1943	18 September 1943	4 days	
	Albert Lind MP	United Country	18 September 1943	2 October 1945	2 years, 14 days	
	Bill Galvin MP	Labor	21 November 1945	20 November 1947	1 year, 364 days	
	John McDonald MP	Liberal	20 November 1947	3 December 1948	1 year, 13 days	
	Thomas Hollway MP	Liberal	3 December 1948	8 December 1948	5 days	
	Rutherford Guthrie MP	Liberal	8 December 1948	19 June 1950	1 year, 193 days	
	William Leggatt MP	Liberal	19 June 1950	27 June 1950	8 days	
	Albert Lind MP	Country	27 June 1950	28 October 1952	2 years, 123 days	
	John Hipworth MP	Liberal	28 October 1952	31 October 1952	3 days	
	Albert Lind MP	Country	31 October 1952	17 December 1952	47 days	
	Robert Holt MP	Labor	17 December 1952	15 December 1953	363 days	
	Joseph Smith MP	Labor	22 December 1953	7 June 1955	1 year, 167 days	
	Henry Bolte MP	Liberal	7 June 1955	8 June 1955	1 day	
	Keith Turnbull MP	Liberal	8 June 1955	27 June 1964	9 years, 19 days	

== Sources ==
This article incorporates text from a free content work. Licensed under CC BY 4.0 (license statement/permission). Text taken from Department of Crown Lands and Survey, Public Record Office Victoria.
