= Peter McBride (politician) =

Australian politician

Sir Peter McBride (9 February 1867 – 3 March 1923) was a politician in the Australian colony and State of Victoria. He was subsequently appointed Victoria's agent-general in London.

== Biography ==
Caricature by David Low

McBride was born in Dunnolly, Victoria, son of a hardware merchant and educated at Wesley College. He was elected to the Legislative Assembly seat of Kara Kara in May 1897 and held it until February 1913, when he resigned and was succeeded by John Pennington. During his parliamentary career he held the portfolios of Minister of Mines and Forests, and Minister for Railways from May 1912 to March 1913. He also served as vice-president of the Board of Lands and Works from January 1909 to March 1913 and in 1911 was acting Chief Secretary.

He was appointed Agent-general for Victoria in 1913, serving in that position with distinction through the war years, and resigned in 1921 due to steadily declining health. He was replaced in 1922 by John McWhae. He died at Cannes and his remains were buried in the Cannes cemetery.

== Recognition ==
McBride was knighted in 1915. He also received the decorations of the Serbian Order of St Sava and the Belgian Order of the Crown.

== Family ==
On 26 October 1892 McBride married his cousin Mary Isabella Lawson. Their eldest son, Peter McBride enlisted with the York and Lancaster Regiment and was killed at The Somme in 1910. Their second son, Alan McBride was a commissioned officer in the Royal Field Artillery. He married Kathleen Twomey of Penshurst, Victoria on 15 March 1922.
