= Duncan Gillies =

Australian politician (1834–1903)

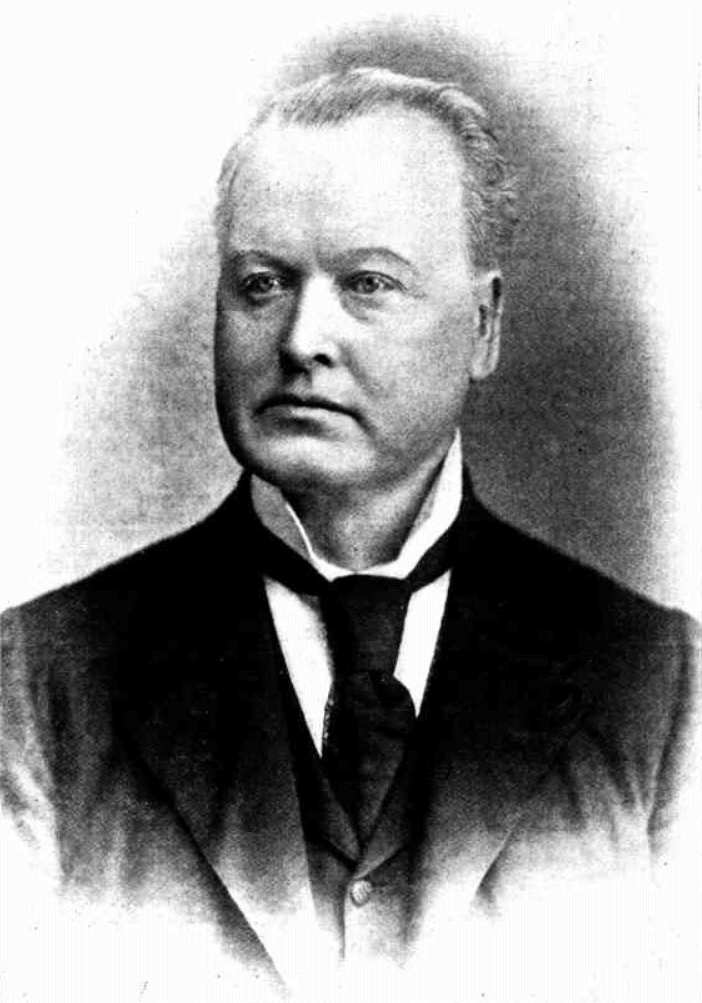

14th Premier of Victoria
- In office 18 February 1886 – 5 November 1890
- Preceded by: James Service
- Succeeded by: James Munro

9th Speaker of the Victorian Legislative Assembly
- In office 14 October 1902 – 12 September 1903
- Preceded by: Francis Mason
- Succeeded by: William Beazley

Personal details
- Born: 14 January 1834 Overnewton, Glasgow, Scotland
- Died: 12 September 1903 (aged 69) Carlton, Victoria, Australia
- Resting place: Melbourne General Cemetery
- Spouse: Harriett Turquand Fillan (m. 1897)

Duncan Gillies (14 January 1834 – 12 September 1903), was an Australian colonial politician who served as the 14th Premier of Victoria.

== Biography ==
Gillies was born at Overnewton near Glasgow, Scotland. In 1852, he arrived in Melbourne and travelled to the goldfields at Ballarat, where he worked first as a miner and later as a businessman and company director.

Gillies was elected to the Victorian Legislative Assembly for Ballarat West in 1861, holding that seat until 1868. A conservative, he was President of the Board of Lands and Works in the short-lived government of Charles Sladen in 1868, which cost him his seat at Ballarat, a strongly liberal constituency. He was elected for Maryborough 1870–77, Rodney 1877–89, Eastern Suburbs 1889–94 and Toorak 1897–1903. He was Commissioner for Railways and Roads in the ministries of James Francis and George Kerferd from 1872 to 1875, and Agriculture Minister in the third government of Sir James McCulloch in 1875–77.

In both the first (1880) and second (1883–86) governments of Service, Gillies was Commissioner for Railways and Vice-President of the Board of Land and Works. He was also Minister of Public Instruction 1884–86. As Railways Minister, he proved to be amenable to lobbying from members of parliament and others, initiating the 1884 Railway Construction Act (nicknamed the Octopus Act) which extravagantly authorised the building of 59 new rail lines. He also assisted the passage of a bill to allow the Melbourne Tramway and Omnibus Company monopoly rights to operate a cable tram network in the city and suburbs.

Service retired before the 1886 elections and Gillies succeeded him as Premier, forming a coalition government with the liberal leader Alfred Deakin, and winning a comfortable majority over a divided opposition at the elections. The Gillies ministry presided over the climax of the long economic boom which Victoria had enjoyed since the gold rushes of the 1850s. The great Victorian Land Boom took off in late 1880s and reached a climax in 1890. There was no regulation of the banking and finance industries at that time, and no expectation that governments could or should protect investors against unsound or unscrupulous financial schemes. More than 50 million pounds of speculative capital from Britain flowed into the colony, much of which was spent buying land in suburban Melbourne at hugely inflated prices. Gillies was not himself responsible for that, although his government did nothing to prevent it.

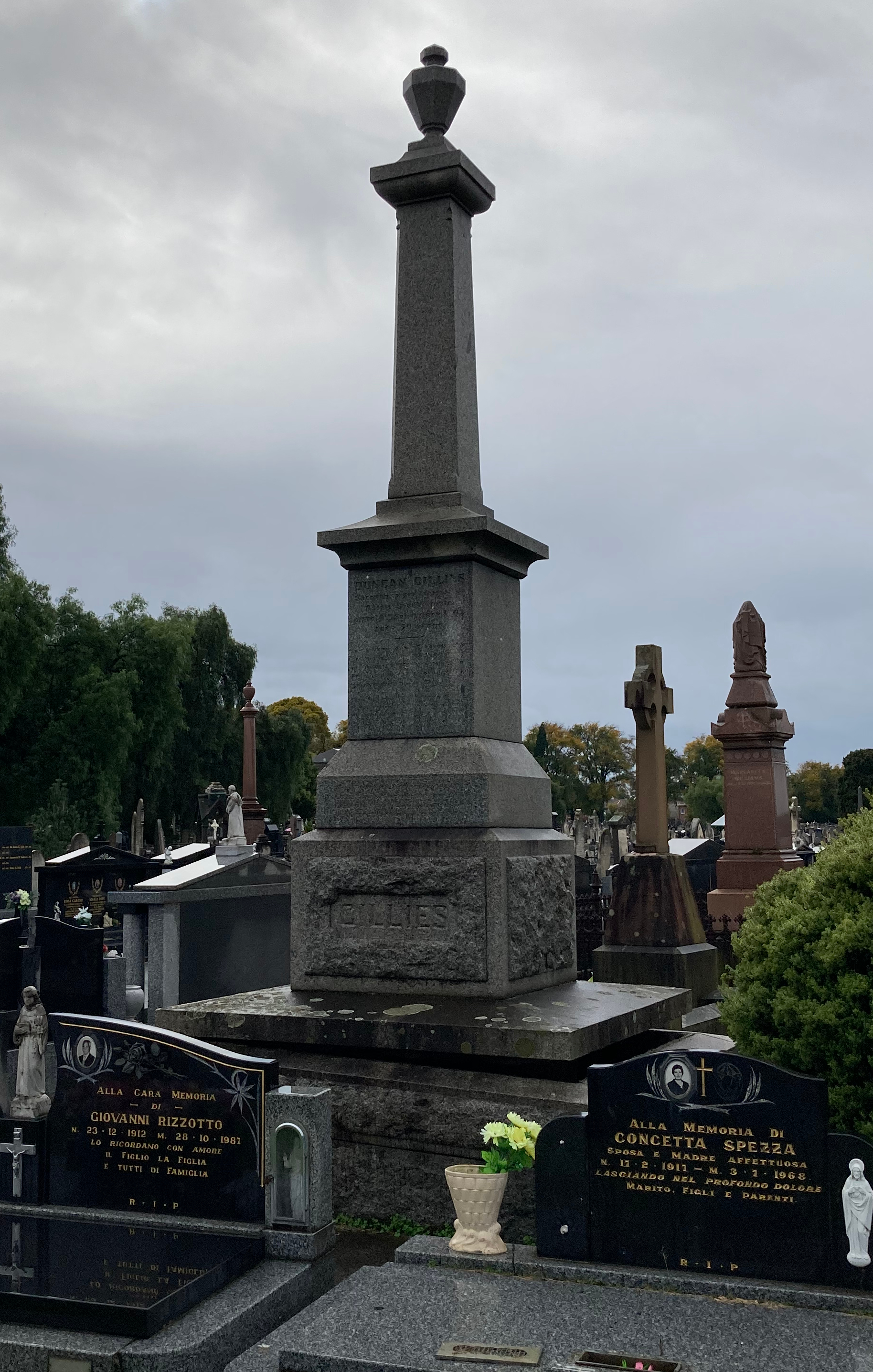
Gillies' grave at Melbourne General Cemetery

The Gillies government was easily re-elected in 1889, but the Boom collapsed after 1890 and a sharp recession followed. In October, Gillies was defeated in a confidence motion when a section of his own followers led by James Munro turned against him. In 1891, the recession turned into a depression, and Gillies was among the many speculators and shareholders who were wiped out in the crash.

In 1893, Gillies withdrew from active politics, reluctantly accepting the post of agent-general in London. On his return to Victoria, he successfully contested the seat of Toorak in 1897. In 1902, he was elected Speaker, a post he held until his death the following year. He had married Harriett Turquand Fillan (née Theobald), a widow of 37, while in London. She had been persuaded by Gillies' friends to return to her nursing in Johannesburg without announcing herself to Melbourne society. He had declined the offer of a K.C.M.G. in 1887.

Gillies was buried at Melbourne General Cemetery.

A portrait of Gillies by Josephine Muntz-Adams hangs in Parliament House Victoria.

== Bibliography ==
- Geoff Browne, A Biographical Register of the Victorian Parliament, 1900-84, Government Printer, Melbourne, 1985
- Don Garden, Victoria: A History, Thomas Nelson, Melbourne, 1984
- Kathleen Thompson and Geoffrey Serle, A Biographical Register of the Victorian Parliament, 1856-1900, Australian National University Press, Canberra, 1972
- Raymond Wright, A People's Counsel. A History of the Parliament of Victoria, 1856-1990, Oxford University Press, Melbourne, 1992
- Serle, Percival (1949). "Gillies, Duncan". Dictionary of Australian Biography. Sydney: Angus & Robertson.
- Margot Beever, 'Gillies, Duncan (1834 - 1903)', Australian Dictionary of Biography, Volume 4, MUP, 1972, pp. 250–252.

Political offices
Preceded by James Service	Premier of Victoria; 1886–1890	Succeeded by James Munro
