= John McWhae =

Australian politician

Sir John McWhae (22 June 1858 – 17 September 1927) was an Australian politician.

He was born in Ballarat to miner Peter McWhae and Grace Wilson. His father found success on the Ballarat goldfields and the family returned to Scotland for a time, returning to Victoria in 1871. McWhae worked as a bank clerk before becoming a sharebroker and a member of the Ballarat Stock Exchange. From around 1890 he worked on the Melbourne Stock Exchange, and he secured his own fortune speculating on the Kalgoorlie boom in 1899 (after early successes at Broken Hill and a setback at Coolgardie. In 1910 he was elected to the Victorian Legislative Council for Melbourne Province. He was associated with the Economy Party in 1917 and was appointed Minister of Public Works; in 1918 he became a minister without portfolio focusing on combating the 1918 influenza epidemic. In 1921 he resigned from Parliament to accept an appointment as Victorian Agent-General, succeeding Peter McBride. He held this position until 1924, and was knighted on his retirement. McWhae died in Yokohama in Japan in 1927.

Victorian Legislative Council
Preceded by William Cain	Member for Melbourne; 1910–1921; Served alongside: John Davies; Henry Weedon; Henry Cohen	Succeeded by Herbert Smith
