= Board of Land and Works =

- Victorian coat of arms

- Flag of Victoria

Statutory authority overview
- Formed: 29 April 1857
- Dissolved: 27 June 1964

The Board of Land and Works was a government authority in Victoria, Australia. It was established by an act of parliament in 1857, with the aim of consolidating and coordinating the administration of public lands and public works. Consequently, the two positions of Commissioner of Public Works and Surveyor General or Commissioner of Crown Lands and Survey were abolished.

Throughout its existence, the Board of Land and Works was responsible for matters involving public works and public lands. At various stages, it also had responsibility for railways from 1857 to 1884, for railway construction from 1892 to 1964, for main roads and bridges from 1858 until 1913, for sewage and water supply in Melbourne from 1859 to 1890, for rural water supply from c.1860 until 1910, for Aboriginal welfare from 1857 until 1860, and for local government from 1857 to 1958. Carrying out those functions was delegated to sub-departments of the board, many of which became departments of the state government after the abolition of the board in 1964.

In its first report to parliament in 1891, the Parliamentary Standing Committee on Railways recommended that the construction of new railway lines be separated from the management of railway traffic and maintenance. As a result, the Railway Construction Branch of the Board of Land and Works was set up. The Minister for Railways (the Minister for Transport after 1934) was made, ex officio, one of the vice-presidents of the Board, which was a return to the situation which had existed prior to the transfer of the management of the railways to the Victorian Railways Commissioners in 1883-1884.

== Presidents of the Board of Land and Works ==
Order	MP	Party affiliation	Term start	Term end	Time in office	Notes
	David Moore MP	Independent	29 April 1857	10 March 1858	315 days	
	Charles Gavan Duffy MP	Independent	10 March 1858	22 March 1859	1 year, 12 days	
	George Evans MP	Independent	22 March 1859	27 October 1859	219 days	
	James Service MP	Independent	27 October 1859	3 September 1860	312 days	
	Vincent Pyke MP	Independent	3 September 1860	24 September 1860	21 days	
	Augustus Greeves MP	Independent	24 September 1860	26 November 1860	63 days	
	John Henry Brooke MP	Independent	26 November 1860	14 November 1861	353 days	
	Charles Gavan Duffy (Australian politician) MP	Independent	14 November 1861	27 June 1863	1 year, 225 days	
	Richard Heales MP	Independent	27 June 1863	19 June 1864	358 days	
	James M Grant MP	Independent	5 September 1864	6 May 1868	3 years, 244 days	
	Duncan Gillies MP	Independent	6 May 1868	11 July 1868	66 days	
	James M Grant MP	Independent	11 July 1868	20 September 1869	1 year, 71 days	
	James McKean MP	Independent	20 September 1869	9 April 1870	201 days	
	John A Macpherson MP	Independent	9 April 1870	19 June 1871	1 year, 71 days	
	James M Grant MLC	Independent	19 June 1871	10 June 1872	357 days	
	James Casey MP	Independent	19 June 1872	7 August 1875	3 years, 49 days	
	Francis Longmore MP	Independent	7 August 1875	20 October 1875	74 days	
	Duncan Gillies MP	Independent	20 October 1875	21 May 1877	1 year, 213 days	
	Francis Longmore MP	Independent	21 May 1877	5 March 1880	2 years, 289 days	
	John Gavan Duffy MP	Independent	5 March 1880	3 August 1880	151 days	
	Richard Richardson MP	Independent	3 August 1880	9 July 1881	340 days	
	David Gaunson MP	Independent	9 July 1881	2 August 1881	24 days	
	Walter Madden MP	Independent	19 August 1881	8 March 1883	1 year, 201 days	
	Albert Tucker MP	Independent	8 March 1883	18 February 1886	2 years, 347 days	
	John Dow MP	Independent	18 February 1886	5 November 1890	4 years, 260 days	
	Allan McLean MP	Independent	5 November 1890	23 January 1893	2 years, 79 days	
	John McIntyre MP	Independent	23 January 1893	27 September 1894	1 year, 247 days	
	Robert Best MP	Independent	27 September 1894	5 December 1899	5 years, 69 days	
	James McColl MP	Independent	5 December 1899	19 November 1900	349 days	
	Daniel Joseph Duggan MP	Independent	19 November 1900	10 June 1902	1 year, 203 days	
	Malcolm McKenzie MP	Reform	10 June 1902	28 January 1903	232 days	
	John William Taverner MP	Reform	6 February 1903	16 February 1904	1 year, 10 days	
	John Murray MP	Reform	16 February 1904	15 August 1906	2 years, 180 days	
	John Mackey MP	Reform	15 August 1906	31 October 1908	2 years, 77 days	
	Thomas Hunt MP	Reform	31 October 1908	8 January 1909	69 days	
	Hugh McKenzie MP	Commonwealth Liberal	8 January 1909	9 December 1913	4 years, 335 days	
	William Plain MP	Labor	9 December 1913	22 December 1913	13 days	
	Harry Lawson MP	Commonwealth Liberal	22 December 1913	9 November 1915	1 year, 322 days	
	William Hutchinson MP	Commonwealth Liberal	9 November 1915	29 November 1917	2 years, 20 days	
	Frank Clarke MLC	Nationalist	29 November 1917	21 October 1919	1 year, 326 days	
	Harry Lawson MP	Nationalist	21 October 1919	4 November 1920	1 year, 14 days	
	David Oman MP	Nationalist	4 November 1920	7 September 1923	2 years, 307 days	
	John Allan MP	Nationalist	7 September 1923	19 March 1924	194 days	
	David Oman MP	Nationalist	19 March 1924	18 July 1924	121 days	
	Henry Bailey MP	Labor	18 July 1924	18 November 1924	123 days	
	Alfred Downward MP	Country	18 November 1924	20 May 1927	2 years, 183 days	
	Henry Bailey MP	Labor	20 May 1927	22 November 1928	1 year, 186 days	
	Henry Angus MP	Nationalist	22 November 1928	12 December 1929	1 year, 20 days	
	Henry Bailey MP	Labor	12 December 1929	19 May 1932	2 years, 159 days	
	Albert Dunstan MP	United Australia Party	19 May 1932	20 March 1935	2 years, 305 days	
	Thomas Maltby MP	United Australia Party	20 March 1935	2 April 1935	13 days	
	Albert Lind MP	United Country	2 April 1935	1 January 1942	6 years, 274 days	
	George Tuckett MLC	United Country	8 January 1942	14 September 1943	1 year, 249 days	
	Daniel McNamara MLC	Labor	14 September 1943	18 September 1943	4 days	
	Albert Lind MP	United Country	18 September 1943	2 October 1945	2 years, 14 days	
	Bill Galvin MP	Labor	21 November 1945	20 November 1947	1 year, 364 days	
	John McDonald MP	Country	20 November 1947	3 December 1948	1 year, 13 days	
	Thomas Hollway MP	Liberal	3 December 1948	8 December 1948	5 days	
	Rutherford Guthrie MP	Liberal	8 December 1948	19 June 1950	1 year, 193 days	
	William Leggatt MP	Liberal	19 June 1950	27 June 1950	8 days	
	Albert Lind MP	Country	27 June 1950	28 October 1952	2 years, 123 days	
	John Hipworth MP	Electoral Reform League	28 October 1952	31 October 1952	3 days	
	Albert Lind MP	Country	31 October 1952	17 December 1952	47 days	
	Robert Holt MP	Labor	17 December 1952	15 December 1953	363 days	
	Joseph Smith MP	Labor	22 December 1953	7 June 1955	1 year, 167 days	
	Henry Bolte MP	Liberal Country Party	7 June 1955	8 June 1955	1 day	
	Keith Turnbull MP	Liberal Country Party	8 June 1955	27 June 1964	9 years, 19 days	

== Vice-Presidents of the Board of Land and Works ==
Vice-President of the Board of Land and Works of Victoria
- Victorian coat of arms

- Flag of Victoria
- Member of: Parliament; Executive council
- Nominator: Premier
- Appointer: Governor on the recommendation of the premier
- Term length: At the governor's pleasure
- Inaugural holder: John Charles King
- Formation: 27 October 1859
- Final holder: Gilbert Chandler
- Abolished: 27 June 1964

Note: Position may be held concurrently with other MPs.

Order	MP	Party affiliation	Term start	Term end	Time in office	Notes
	John Charles King MP	Independent	27 October 1859	25 November 1859	29 days	
	James Francis MP	Independent	25 November 1859	3 September 1860	283 days	
	John Bailey MP	Independent	3 September 1860	2 October 1860	29 days	
	Vincent Pyke MP	Independent	2 October 1860	26 November 1860	55 days	
	James Johnston MP	Independent	26 November 1860	20 February 1861	86 days	
	James M Grant MP	Independent	20 February 1861	14 November 1861	267 days	
	James Johnston MP	Independent	14 November 1861	27 June 1863	1 year, 225 days	
	Matthew Hervey MLC	Independent	27 June 1863	22 July 1865	2 years, 25 days	
	James M Grant MP	Independent	27 June 1863	5 September 1864	1 year, 70 days	
	Henry Miller MLC	Independent	18 July 1866	16 January 1867	182 days	
	William Vale MP	Independent	18 July 1866	6 May 1868	1 year, 293 days	
	John MacGregor MP	Independent	21 January 1867	4 March 1867	42 days	
	James Sullivan MP	Independent	4 March 1867	6 May 1868	1 year, 63 days	
	Michael O'Grady MP	Independent	6 May 1868	11 July 1868	66 days	
	George Kerferd MP	Independent	8 May 1868	11 July 1868	64 days	
	George Higinbotham MP	Independent	11 July 1868	25 May 1869	318 days	
	Charles Jones MP	Independent	3 August 1868	9 March 1869	218 days	
	James Sullivan MP	Independent	1 February 1869	20 September 1869	231 days	
	William Bates MP	Independent	9 April 1870	12 April 1870	3 days	
	Michael O'Grady MP	Independent	19 June 1871	10 June 1872	357 days	
	Francis Longmore MP	Independent	19 June 1871	10 June 1872	357 days	
	Duncan Gillies MP	Independent	10 June 1872	7 August 1875	3 years, 58 days	
	Alexander Fraser MLC	Independent	14 June 1872	4 May 1874	1 year, 324 days	
	Robert Stirling Hore Anderson MLC	Independent	4 May 1874	7 August 1875	1 year, 95 days	
	John Woods MP	Independent	23 August 1875	20 October 1875	58 days	
	James Patterson MP	Independent	23 August 1875	20 October 1875	58 days	
	Joseph Jones MP	Independent	20 October 1875	21 May 1877	1 year, 213 days	
	James Patterson MP	Independent	28 May 1877	5 March 1880	2 years, 282 days	
	John Woods MP	Independent	11 June 1877	5 March 1880	2 years, 268 days	
	Duncan Gillies MP	Independent	16 March 1880	3 August 1880	140 days	
	Thomas Bent MP	Independent	16 March 1880	3 August 1880	140 days	
	George D Langridge MP	Independent	12 August 1880	9 July 1881	331 days	
	James Patterson MP	Independent	12 August 1880	9 July 1881	331 days	
	Thomas Bent MP	Independent	9 July 1881	8 March 1883	1 year, 242 days	
	Charles Young MP	Independent	19 August 1881	8 March 1883	1 year, 201 days	
	Duncan Gillies MP	Independent	12 March 1883	18 February 1886	2 years, 343 days	
	Alfred Deakin MP	Independent	12 March 1883	18 February 1886	2 years, 343 days	
	John Nimmo MP	Independent	23 February 1886	1 June 1889	3 years, 98 days	
	David Davies MP	Independent	1 June 1889	17 June 1889	16 days	
	James Patterson MP	Independent	17 June 1889	2 September 1890	1 year, 77 days	
	William Anderson MP	Independent	2 September 1890	5 November 1890	64 days	
	James Wheeler MP	Independent	26 March 1891	22 April 1891	27 days	
	Alfred Richard Outtrim MP	Independent	28 April 1891	23 January 1893	1 year, 270 days	
	George Graham MP	Independent	16 February 1892	23 January 1893	342 days	
	Richard Baker MP	Independent	23 January 1893	27 September 1894	1 year, 247 days	
	William Webb MP	Independent	23 January 1893	27 September 1894	1 year, 247 days	
	Frederick Thomas Sargood MLC	Independent	27 September 1894	20 December 1894	84 days	
	John William Taverner MP	Independent	27 September 1894	5 December 1899	5 years, 69 days	
	George Turner MP	Independent	20 December 1894	13 February 1895	55 days	
	William McCulloch MLC	Independent	13 February 1895	5 December 1899	4 years, 295 days	
	Alfred Richard Outtrim MP	Independent	5 December 1899	19 November 1900	349 days	
	George Graham MP	Independent	5 December 1899	19 November 1900	349 days	
	Donald Melville MLC	Independent	5 December 1899	19 November 1900	349 days	
	William McCulloch MLC	Independent	19 November 1900	12 February 1901	85 days	
	William Trenwith MP	Independent	19 November 1900	10 June 1902	1 year, 203 days	
	William McCulloch MLC	Independent	12 February 1901	10 June 1902	1 year, 118 days	
	Robert McGregor MP	Independent	12 February 1901	10 June 1902	1 year, 118 days	
	Thomas Bent MP	Reform	10 June 1902	21 July 1903	1 year, 41 days	
	John William Taverner MP	Reform	10 June 1902	6 February 1903	241 days	
	Arthur Sachse MLC	Reform	24 June 1902	16 February 1904	1 year, 237 days	
	Thomas Bent MP	Reform	16 February 1904	8 January 1909	4 years, 327 days	
	Arthur Sachse MLC	Reform	16 February 1904	31 October 1908	4 years, 258 days	
	Ewen Hugh Cameron MP	Reform	16 February 1904	31 October 1908	4 years, 258 days	
	Donald McLeod MP	Reform	16 February 1904	8 January 1909	4 years, 327 days	
	John Bowser MP	Reform	31 October 1908	8 January 1909	69 days	
	Duncan McBryde MLC	Reform	31 October 1908	8 January 1909	69 days	
	Peter McBride MP	Commonwealth Liberal	8 January 1909	31 May 1910	1 year, 143 days	
	Alfred Billson MP	Commonwealth Liberal	8 January 1909	18 May 1912	3 years, 131 days	
	William Baillieu MLC	Commonwealth Liberal	8 January 1909	15 June 1909	158 days	
	James Cameron MP	Commonwealth Liberal	15 June 1909	25 October 1909	132 days	
	William Baillieu MLC	Commonwealth Liberal	25 October 1909	14 February 1911	1 year, 112 days	
	Peter McBride MP	Commonwealth Liberal	31 May 1910	18 May 1912	1 year, 353 days	
	William Watt MP	Commonwealth Liberal	31 May 1910	30 November 1910	183 days	
	William Edgar MLC	Commonwealth Liberal	14 February 1911	18 May 1912	1 year, 94 days	
	Alfred Billson MP	Commonwealth Liberal	18 May 1912	9 December 1913	1 year, 205 days	
	Peter McBride MP	Commonwealth Liberal	18 May 1912	19 February 1913	277 days	
	William Edgar MLC	Commonwealth Liberal	18 May 1912	21 June 1913	1 year, 34 days	
	Alexander Peacock MP	Commonwealth Liberal	19 February 1913	9 December 1913	293 days	
	Frederick Hagelthorn MLC	Commonwealth Liberal	21 June 1913	9 December 1913	171 days	
	Alfred Richard Outtrim MP	Labor	9 December 1913	22 December 1913	13 days	
	John Billson MP	Labor	9 December 1913	22 December 1913	13 days	
	Adam McLellan MLC	Labor	9 December 1913	22 December 1913	13 days	
	Frederick Hagelthorn MLC	Commonwealth Liberal	22 December 1913	18 June 1914	178 days	
	Donald Mackinnon MP	Commonwealth Liberal	22 December 1913	18 June 1914	178 days	
	James Drysdale Brown MLC	Commonwealth Liberal	22 December 1913	18 June 1914	178 days	
	Frederick Hagelthorn MLC	Commonwealth Liberal	18 June 1914	29 November 1917	3 years, 164 days	
	James Drysdale Brown MLC	Commonwealth Liberal	18 June 1914	29 November 1917	3 years, 164 days	
	Donald Mackinnon MP	Commonwealth Liberal	18 June 1914	9 November 1915	1 year, 144 days	
	Thomas Livingston MP	Commonwealth Liberal	9 November 1915	29 November 1917	2 years, 20 days	
	Hugh McKenzie MP	Commonwealth Liberal	9 November 1915	29 November 1917	2 years, 20 days	
	Agar Wynne MP	Nationalist	29 November 1917	21 March 1918	112 days	
	Alfred Downward MP	Nationalist	29 November 1917	21 March 1918	112 days	
	John McWhae MLC	Nationalist	29 November 1917	21 March 1918	112 days	
	William Hutchinson MP	Nationalist	21 March 1918	1 November 1920	2 years, 225 days	
	Samuel Barnes MP	Nationalist	21 March 1918	7 September 1923	5 years, 170 days	
	Arthur Robinson MLC	Nationalist	21 March 1918	21 October 1919	1 year, 214 days	
	Frank Clarke MLC	Nationalist	21 October 1919	7 September 1923	3 years, 321 days	
	Alexander Peacock MP	Nationalist	4 November 1920	19 March 1924	3 years, 136 days	
	Francis Old MP	Nationalist	7 September 1923	19 March 1924	194 days	
	George Goudie MLC	Nationalist	7 September 1923	19 March 1924	194 days	
	Alexander Peacock MP	Nationalist	19 March 1924	28 April 1924	40 days	
	John Gordon MP	Nationalist	19 March 1924	18 July 1924	121 days	
	Frederic Eggleston MP	Nationalist	19 March 1924	18 July 1924	121 days	
	Henry Cohen MLC	Nationalist	19 March 1924	18 July 1924	121 days	
	Richard Toutcher MP	Nationalist	28 April 1924	18 July 1924	81 days	
	Edmond Hogan MP	Labor	18 July 1924	18 November 1924	123 days	
	John Percy Jones MLC	Labor	18 July 1924	18 November 1924	123 days	
	Daniel McNamara MLC	Labor	18 July 1924	18 November 1924	123 days	
	Horace Richardson MLC	Country	18 November 1924	20 May 1927	2 years, 183 days	
	Frederic Eggleston MP	Country	18 November 1924	20 May 1927	2 years, 183 days	
	George Goudie MLC	Country	18 November 1924	20 May 1927	2 years, 183 days	
	Thomas Tunnecliffe MP	Labor	20 May 1927	22 November 1928	1 year, 186 days	
	John Percy Jones MLC	Labor	20 May 1927	22 November 1928	1 year, 186 days	
	William Beckett MLC	Labor	20 May 1927	22 November 1928	1 year, 186 days	
	Frank Groves MP	Nationalist	22 November 1928	10 December 1929	1 year, 18 days	
	John Pennington MP	Nationalist	22 November 1928	12 December 1929	1 year, 20 days	
	Alfred Chandler MLC	Nationalist	22 November 1928	12 December 1929	1 year, 20 days	
	Henry Beardmore MP	Nationalist	10 December 1929	12 December 1929	2 days	
	John Cain MP	Labor	12 December 1929	19 May 1932	2 years, 159 days	
	John Percy Jones MLC	Labor	12 December 1929	26 April 1932	2 years, 136 days	
	William Beckett MLC	Labor	12 December 1929	24 June 1931	1 year, 194 days	
	Robert Williams MLC	Labor	24 June 1931	19 May 1932	330 days	
	George Goudie MLC	United Australia Party	19 May 1932	20 March 1935	2 years, 305 days	
	John Allan MP	United Australia Party	19 May 1932	20 March 1935	2 years, 305 days	
	John Percy Jones MLC	United Australia Party	19 May 1932	20 March 1935	2 years, 305 days	
	Wilfrid Kent Hughes MP	United Australia Party	25 July 1934	2 April 1935	251 days	
	Clive Shields MP	United Australia Party	20 March 1935	2 April 1935	13 days	
	John Percy Jones MLC	United Australia Party	20 March 1935	2 April 1935	13 days	
	Edmond Hogan MP	United Country	2 April 1935	28 June 1943	8 years, 87 days	
	George Goudie MLC	United Country	2 April 1935	14 September 1943	8 years, 165 days	
	Herbert Hyland MP	United Country	27 April 1938	14 September 1943	5 years, 140 days	
	Norman Martin MP	United Country	28 June 1943	14 September 1943	78 days	
	Frank Field MP	Labor	14 September 1943	18 September 1943	4 days	
	William McKenzie MP	Labor	14 September 1943	18 September 1943	4 days	
	Bill Barry MP	Labor	14 September 1943	18 September 1943	4 days	
	Norman Martin MP	United Country	18 September 1943	2 October 1945	2 years, 14 days	
	John Lienhop MLC	United Country	18 September 1943	2 October 1945	2 years, 14 days	
	James Kennedy MLC	United Australia Party	18 September 1943	2 October 1945	2 years, 14 days	
	William Cumming MP	Liberal	2 October 1945	21 November 1945	50 days	
	Likely McBrien MLC	Independent	2 October 1945	21 November 1945	50 days	
	William Everard MP	Liberal	2 October 1945	21 November 1945	50 days	
	James Disney MLC	Liberal	2 October 1945	21 November 1945	50 days	
	William McKenzie MP	Labor	21 November 1945	20 November 1947	1 year, 364 days	
	Pat Kennelly MLC	Labor	21 November 1945	19 August 1947	1 year, 271 days	
	Thomas Hayes MP	Labor	19 August 1947	20 November 1947	93 days	
	James Kennedy MLC	Liberal	20 November 1947	8 December 1948	1 year, 18 days	
	Wilfrid Kent Hughes MP	Liberal	20 November 1947	29 October 1949	1 year, 343 days	
	Alexander Dennett MP	Liberal	20 November 1947	15 December 1949	2 years, 25 days	
	Thomas Hollway MP	Liberal	29 October 1949	15 December 1949	47 days	
	Edward Guye MP	Liberal	15 December 1949	27 June 1950	194 days	
	John Hipworth MP	Liberal	15 December 1949	27 June 1950	194 days	
	Percy Byrnes MLC	Country	27 June 1950	28 October 1952	2 years, 123 days	
	Herbert Hyland MP	Country	27 June 1950	28 October 1952	2 years, 123 days	
	George Moss MP	Country	27 June 1950	28 October 1952	2 years, 123 days	
	John Don MP	Electoral Reform League	28 October 1952	31 October 1952	3 days	
	Charles Gartside MLC	Electoral Reform League	28 October 1952	31 October 1952	3 days	
	Hugh MacLeod MLC	Electoral Reform League	28 October 1952	31 October 1952	3 days	
	Percy Byrnes MLC	Country	31 October 1952	17 December 1952	47 days	
	Herbert Hyland MP	Country	31 October 1952	17 December 1952	47 days	
	George Moss MP	Country	31 October 1952	17 December 1952	47 days	
	Clive Stoneham MP	Labor	17 December 1952	7 June 1955	2 years, 172 days	
	Samuel Merrifield MP	Labor	17 December 1952	7 June 1955	2 years, 172 days	
	Les Coleman MLC	Labor	17 December 1952	31 March 1955	2 years, 104 days	
	Don Ferguson MLC	Labor	31 March 1955	7 June 1955	68 days	
	Thomas Maltby MP	Liberal Country Party	7 June 1955	26 July 1961	6 years, 49 days	
	Arthur Warner MLC	Liberal Country Party	7 June 1955	5 September 1962	7 years, 90 days	
	Gilbert Chandler MLC	Liberal Country Party	7 June 1955	27 June 1964	9 years, 20 days	
	Edward Meagher MP	Liberal Country Party	26 July 1961	5 September 1962	1 year, 41 days	
	Horace Petty MP	Liberal Country Party	26 July 1961	27 May 1964	2 years, 306 days	
