= Hugh McKenzie (Australian politician) =

Australian politician

Hugh McKenzie (13 December 1853 – 4 August 1942) was an Australian politician.

Caricature by David Low

He was born in Sutherlandshire to station manager John McKenzie and Elizabeth Clark, but migrated to Victoria as a child around 1857. He attended Scotch College and became a station overseer at Kyabram. From 1874 he ran a store at Undera. On 15 January 1878 he married Margaret Jane Mitchell, with whom he had four children. He became a successful businessman, partnering with John Chanter in a stock and station agency and from 1894 running his own Echuca-based firm. From 1882 to 1924 he served on Echuca Borough Council, with two terms as mayor from 1886 to 1887 and from 1903 to 1904. In 1904 he was elected to the Victorian Legislative Assembly for Rodney. A Liberal, he was Minister of Lands from 1909 to 1913 and Minister of Railways and Water Supply from 1915 to 1917, when he lost his seat. McKenzie died in Echuca in 1942.

Victorian Legislative Assembly
Preceded by Samuel Lancaster	Member for Rodney; 1904–1917	Succeeded by John Allan
