= George Elmslie (politician) =

Australian politician

The Honourable George Elmslie
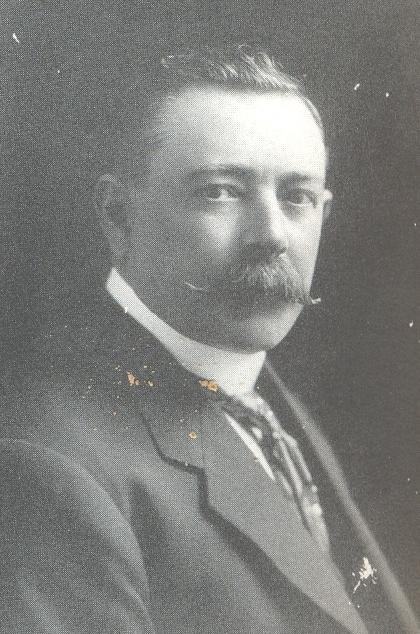

25th Premier of Victoria
- In office 9 December 1913 – 22 December 1913
- Monarch: George V
- Preceded by: William Watt
- Succeeded by: William Watt

Leader of the Opposition of Victoria
- In office 22 December 1913 – 11 May 1918
- Premier: William Watt; Sir Alexander Peacock; John Bowser; Harry Lawson
- Preceded by: William Watt
- Succeeded by: George Prendergast
- In office 17 September 1913 – 9 December 1913
- Premier: William Watt
- Preceded by: George Prendergast
- Succeeded by: William Watt

Leader of the Labor Party in Victoria
- In office 17 September 1913 – 11 May 1918
- Deputy: John Billson
- Preceded by: George Prendergast
- Succeeded by: George Prendergast

Member of the Victorian Legislative Assembly for Albert Park
- In office 1 October 1902 – 11 May 1918
- Preceded by: John White
- Succeeded by: Joseph Hannan

Personal details
- Born: George Alexander Elmslie; 21 February 1861 Lethbridge, Victoria, British Empire
- Died: 11 May 1918 (aged 57) Albert Park, Melbourne, Victoria, Australia
- Spouse: Clara Ellen Williams (m. 1887)
- Children: 2
- Profession: Stonemason

George Alexander Elmslie (21 February 1861 – 11 May 1918) was an Australian politician who served as the 25th and shortest serving Premier of Victoria, and the first Labor Premier.

== Biography ==
Elmslie was born in Lethbridge, near Geelong, and although he had a secondary education, he followed his father's trade as a stonemason. He was employed on the first Wilson Hall at Melbourne University and on St Patrick's Cathedral. From 1888 he was an official of the Operative Stonemason's Society, and a delegate to the Melbourne Trades Hall. He was also President of the South Melbourne Football Club, ancestor of the Sydney Swans.

== Career ==
In 1898, Elmslie was one of the founders of the Victorian Labour Federation, which had as its object "the unification of the workers in one all-comprehensive and extensive union."

In 1902, he was elected to the Victorian Legislative Assembly as Labor member for Albert Park. Labor in Victoria in the early federal period was much weaker than in the other states, partly because of the continuing attraction of Deakinite liberalism for many voters, partly because Victoria did not have the huge pastoral and mining areas that the other mainland states had. The Parliamentary Labor Party remained small and contained limited talent. Elmslie became deputy leader in 1912 and leader in 1913.

At the 1911 election, Labor won only 20 seats to the various factions of the Liberal Party's 43. But in December 1913 the Liberal Premier, William Watt resigned after a dispute with the rural faction of his own party. The acting Governor, Sir John Madden, surprised the Liberals by sending for Elmslie, who on 9 December formed Victoria's first Labor government.

Elmslie had no chance of a long tenure, or even of meeting the House as Premier, since under the law of the time ministers had to resign their seats and contest by-elections before they could take their seats. The Liberal factions re-united, and Watt moved a no-confidence motion in Elmslie, which Elmslie had to watch from the gallery since he was technically not a member. Elmslie was duly voted out and Watt resumed office on 22 December. Elmslie's premiership lasted just 13 days.

Elmslie remained as Labor leader until shortly before his death in 1918, although his health had broken down in 1916, requiring a long break. During World War I Elmslie supported the Allied cause but opposed conscription for overseas service. He died at his home in Albert Park and was given a state funeral.

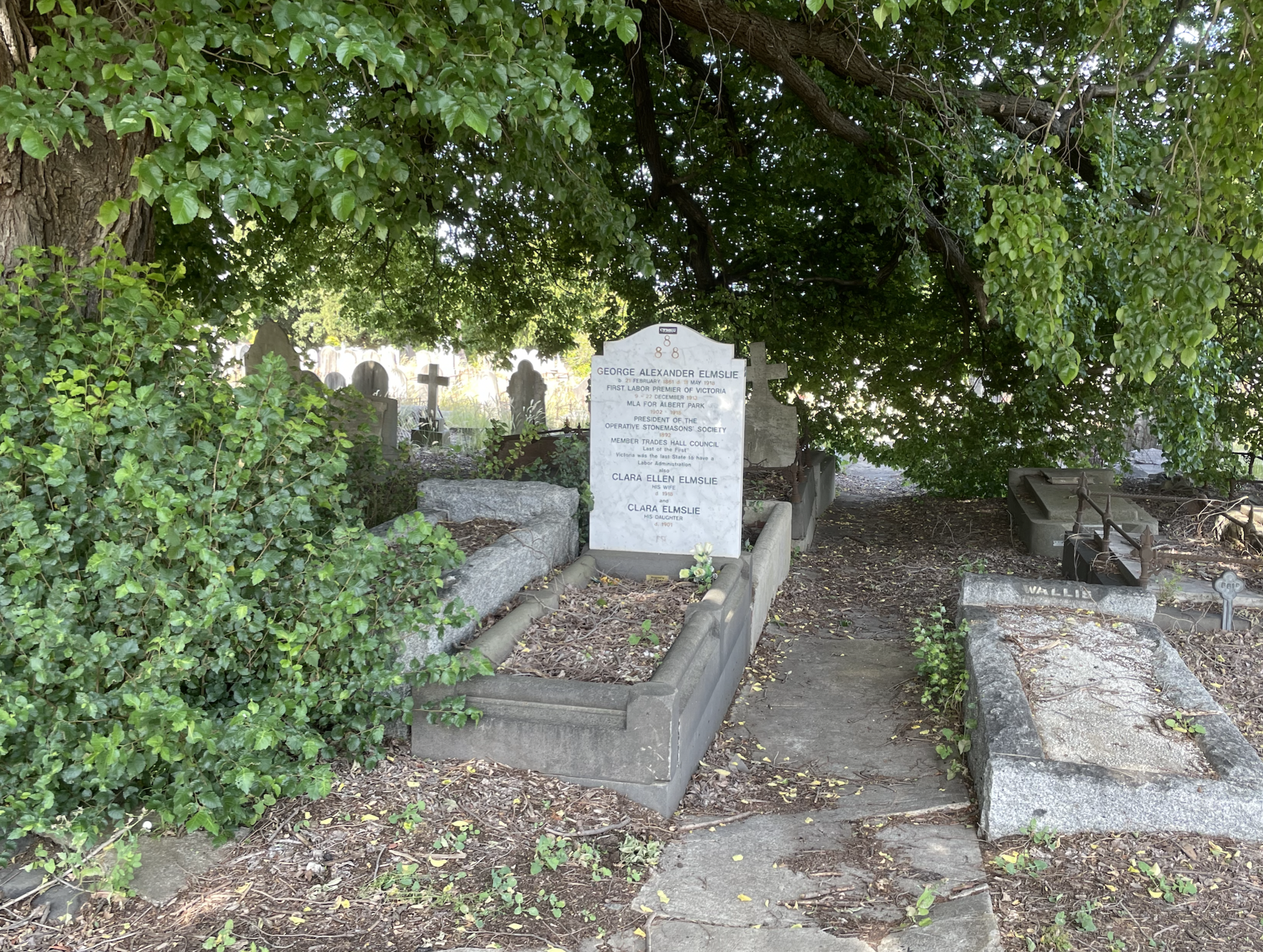
Grave of George Elmslie, first Labor Premier of Victoria. Melbourne General Cemetery.

Elmslie was largely forgotten until members of the Labor Historical Graves Committee discovered his neglected grave in the Melbourne General Cemetery in the 1990s. A new memorial headstone over his grave was unveiled by Steve Bracks, Labor Premier of Victoria, on 9 March 2001.

== Sources ==
- Geoff Browne, A Biographical Register of the Victorian Parliament, 1900–84, Government Printer, Melbourne, 1985
- Don Garden, Victoria: A History, Thomas Nelson, Melbourne, 1984
- Kathleen Thompson and Geoffrey Serle, A Biographical Register of the Victorian Parliament, 1856–1900, Australian National University Press, Canberra, 1972
- Raymond Wright, A People's Counsel. A History of the Parliament of Victoria, 1856–1990, Oxford University Press, Melbourne, 1992

Political offices
Preceded by William Watt	Premier of Victoria; 1913	Succeeded by William Watt
