= George Prendergast =

Australian politician

The Honourable George Prendergast
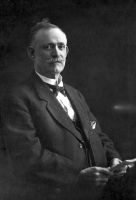

28th Premier of Victoria
- In office 18 July 1924 – 18 November 1924
- Monarch: George V
- Governor: Earl of Stradbroke
- Preceded by: Sir Alexander Peacock
- Succeeded by: John Allan

Leader of the Opposition of Victoria
- In office 18 November 1924 – 14 April 1926
- Premier: John Allan
- Preceded by: Sir Alexander Peacock
- Succeeded by: Edmond Hogan
- In office 18 June 1918 – 18 July 1924
- Premier: Harry Lawson; Sir Alexander Peacock
- Preceded by: George Elmslie
- Succeeded by: Sir Alexander Peacock
- In office 7 June 1904 – 17 September 1913
- Premier: (Sir) Thomas Bent; John Murray; William Watt
- Preceded by: Donald Mackinnon
- Succeeded by: George Elmslie

Leader of the Labor Party in Victoria
- In office 18 June 1918 – 14 April 1926
- Deputy: John Billson; Edmond Hogan
- Preceded by: George Elmslie
- Succeeded by: Edmond Hogan
- In office 7 June 1904 – 17 September 1913
- Deputy: George Elmslie
- Preceded by: Frederick Bromley
- Succeeded by: George Elmslie

Member of the Victorian Legislative Assembly for Footscray
- In office 9 April 1927 – 28 August 1937
- Preceded by: Seat created
- Succeeded by: Jack Mullens

Member of the Victorian Legislative Assembly for North Melbourne
- In office 1 November 1900 – 4 March 1927
- Preceded by: William Watt
- Succeeded by: Seat abolished
- In office 20 September 1894 – 14 October 1897
- Preceded by: Sylvanus Reynolds
- Succeeded by: William Watt

Personal details
- Born: George Michael Prendergast; 20 May 1854 Adelaide, South Australia
- Died: 28 August 1937 (aged 83) Melbourne, Victoria, Australia
- Spouse: Mary Eliza Larrad (m. 1876)
- Children: 3
- Profession: Printer
- Nickname: Mick Prendergast

George Michael "Mick" Prendergast (20 May 1854 – 28 August 1937) was an Australian politician who served as the 28th Premier of Victoria. He was born to Irish emigrant parents in Adelaide, but he grew up in Stawell, Victoria. He was apprenticed as a printer, and worked as a compositor in Ballarat, Sydney and Narrandera before settling in Melbourne in 1887. A member of the Typographical Association, he represented that union at the Melbourne Trades Hall, of which he was President in 1893.

== Career ==
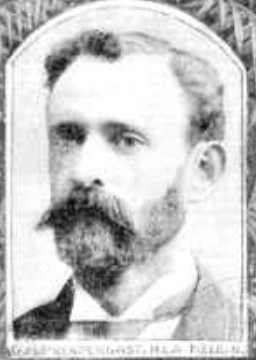
Prendergast early in his parliamentary career.

Prendergast was one of the first Labor members of the Victorian Legislative Assembly, being elected for North Melbourne in 1894. In September 1897, Prendergast was arrested and charged with obstructing a footpath on Bourke Street, Melbourne, after he refused to move when instructed to by a police officer—the case was dismissed by the court. At the 1897 election, Prendergast was defeated by William Watt (another future Premier), but regained the seat in 1900, and held it until it was abolished in 1927. He then shifted to the electorate of Footscray, which he represented until his death. In all he was an MP for 40 years, but was noted more for his fiery stump oratory than any real ability: the historian Kate White calls him "mediocre."

In 1904 Prendergast became the first leader of the Parliamentary Labor Party. He resigned this position through ill-health in 1913, allowing George Elmslie to become the first Labor Premier, and was Chief Secretary in Elmslie's 14-day government. He returned to the Labor leadership in 1918. He was the President of the North Melbourne Football Club for some time.

Victoria was Labor's weakest state throughout the 1920s, due to the gross over-representation of rural areas in the Legislative Assembly, and the strength of the Country Party in rural areas and the Nationalist Party in middle-class Melbourne seats. Labor's parliamentary representation was confined to the industrial areas of Melbourne and a few provincial towns. There was little talent in the Parliamentary Labor Party and few regarded Prendergast as likely ever to win a state election.

In April 1924, however, the Country Party withdrew its support from the Nationalist government of Alexander Peacock when he tried to pass a bill reducing rural representation. Peacock called an election in June, at which Labor won 27 seats, the Nationalists 20 and the Country Party 13.

Labor offered a series of policy concessions to the Country Party, and the party agreed to support a minority Labor government. Prendergast thus became Premier at the age of 70 – the oldest man ever to take the office for the first time. The only real talents in his government were Edmond Hogan as Minister for Agriculture and Railways and William Slater as Attorney-General. John Cain was an Assistant Minister.

Prendergast's government was the first Labor government in Victoria able actually to govern (Elmslie's government had had no chance to do anything before being defeated). Action was taken to provide shelter for jobless Victorians, while the government set up royal commissions into the causes of a police strike and the prices of bread and flour. Increased expenditure was made available for rural roads, while reductions were made on rail freights and fares.

With the support of the Country Party, he was able to pass several bills assisting farmers, but the Country Party would not support anything which benefited Labor's urban working-class base. This was a frustrating situation for Labor ministers, and several urged Prendergast to call another election in the hope of improving their position, but Prendergast was too timid to run this risk.

In November the Country Party patched up its differences with the Nationalists, and the two parties joined forces to defeat Prendergast in the Assembly. The Country Party leader, John Allan, succeeded him as Premier.

== Last years ==
Prendergast resigned as Labor Leader in 1926 and was succeeded by Hogan. In Hogan's first minority government (1927–28) he was again Chief Secretary. He died in 1937, still an MP, aged 83. Prendergast's granddaughter Kathleen Prendergast was a paleontologist and physician who became the first woman appointed as a Regimental Medical Officer in the Royal Army Medical Corps. In the army she was known affectionately as "Mick" Prendergast.

Political offices
Preceded by Alexander Peacock	Premier of Victoria; 1924	Succeeded by John Allan

== See also ==
Prendergast Ministry
