= John Allan (Australian politician) =

Australian politician

29th Premier of Victoria
- In office 18 November 1924 – 20 May 1927
- Preceded by: George Prendergast
- Succeeded by: Edmond Hogan

Personal details
- Born: 27 March 1866 Chintin, Lancefield, Victoria
- Died: 22 February 1936 (aged 69) Wyuna South, Victoria, Australia
- Spouse: Annie Stewart
- Cabinet: Allan Ministry

John Allan (27 March 1866 – 22 February 1936) was an Australian politician who served as the 29th Premier of Victoria. He was born near Lancefield, where his father was a farmer of Scottish origin, and educated at state schools. He took up wheat and dairy farming at Wyuna and was director of a butter factory at Kyabram. In 1892 he married Annie Stewart, with whom he had six children.

Northern Victoria was a centre of the movement of militant small farmers who founded first the Victorian Farmers Union (VFU) and later the Country Party as an outlet for their grievances. In 1917 Allan was elected to the Victorian Legislative Assembly as VFU member for Rodney, a district centred on Echuca. In 1919 he became a founding member of the Country Party and its first parliamentary leader, and was a member of its Victorian Central Council. Although the Country Party was highly critical of the ruling Nationalist Party, it was a conservative party and disliked the Labor Party even more, so it usually found itself in an uneasy alliance with the Nationalists.

In 1921 Allan withdrew his support from the Nationalist government of Harry Lawson, over the issue of abolishing the state-run wheat-marketing system which had been introduced during World War I, and which benefited small farmers by keeping wheat prices high. The result was a bitter state election in which the Nationalists won 31 seats, Labor 21 and the Country Party 12. The Country Party then split over the issue of whether to support Lawson or Labor, with Allan in favour of Lawson and a faction led Albert Dunstan favouring an alliance with Labor.

Allan's faction propped up Lawson's government until 1923, when a new coalition government was formed with Lawson as Premier and Allan as Minister for Lands and Immigration. This was the first Nationalist-Country coalition state government. In March 1924 the coalition broke down and the Country Party ministers left the government, and Alexander Peacock formed a minority Nationalist government, which fell in April when the Country Party voted against it. George Prendergast then formed a minority Labor government. This in turn fell in November when the Nationalists and Country Party came to a new agreement.

Under the new coalition agreement, Allan became Australia's first Country Party Premier, with Peacock as his deputy. Dunstan's faction seceded from the party and formed the Country Progressive Party. Allan's government passed some legislation of benefit to farmers, but since a substantial majority of Victorians by this time lived in Melbourne, the government became increasingly unpopular with urban voters. Attempts by both Labor and Nationalists to reduce the over-representation of country areas were resisted by Allan and blocked by the Legislative Council.

As a result, the April 1927 state election saw a big swing to Labor, which won 28 seats to the Nationalists' 15, the Country Party's 10, the Country Progressives four and independents eight. Allan briefly added Attorney-General and Solicitor-General to his portfolios. The election was Labor's best result yet, and enough that two months later the Labor leader Edmond Hogan formed a minority government with Progressive support. Allan resigned in May, and the Country Party stayed in opposition until 1935. In 1930 Dunstan led his followers back into a united party. When Stanley Argyle formed a United Australia Party-Country Party coalition government in 1932, Allan became Minister of Agriculture, but in 1935 Dunstan put Argyle out and formed a government with Labor support. Allan refused to serve in this government, and remained on the backbench until his death in 1936.

A 1928 oil portrait of Allan by artist Aileen Dent hangs in the Victorian Parliament House.

Victorian Legislative Assembly
Preceded by Hugh McKenzie	Member for Rodney; 1917–1936	Succeeded by William Dunstone
Political offices
Preceded by George Prendergast	Premier of Victoria; 1924–1927	Succeeded by Edmond Hogan
