= David Oman =

Australian politician

David Swan Oman (9 November 1866 – 10 April 1930) was an Australian politician.

Oman was born in Lismore, Victoria, to farmer William Oman and Jane Swan. He was educated locally and worked on his father's properties before acquiring property of his own at Highton in partnership with his brother. On 14 August 1895 he married Mary Seymour, with whom he had four children. He served on Hampden Shire Council from 1890 to 1930, with six separate terms as council president.

In 1900 Oman was elected to the Victorian Legislative Assembly as the member for Ripon and Hampden, transferring to Hampden in 1904. Eventually a Nationalist, he was Minister of Agriculture from 1917 to 1920, Minister of Lands from 1920 to 1923 and from March to July 1924, Minister of Immigration from May to September 1923 and March to July 1924, and Minister in charge of the Wheat Scheme from March to July 1924. Although involved with the Victorian Farmers' Union, he never joined the Country Party. Oman was defeated in 1927 and died in Lismore in 1930.

Victorian Legislative Assembly
Preceded by Edwin Austin	Member for Ripon and Hampden; 1900–1904	Abolished
New seat	Member for Hampden; 1904–1927	Succeeded by Arthur Hughes
