= John Murray (Victorian politician) =

Australian politician, 23rd Premier of Victoria

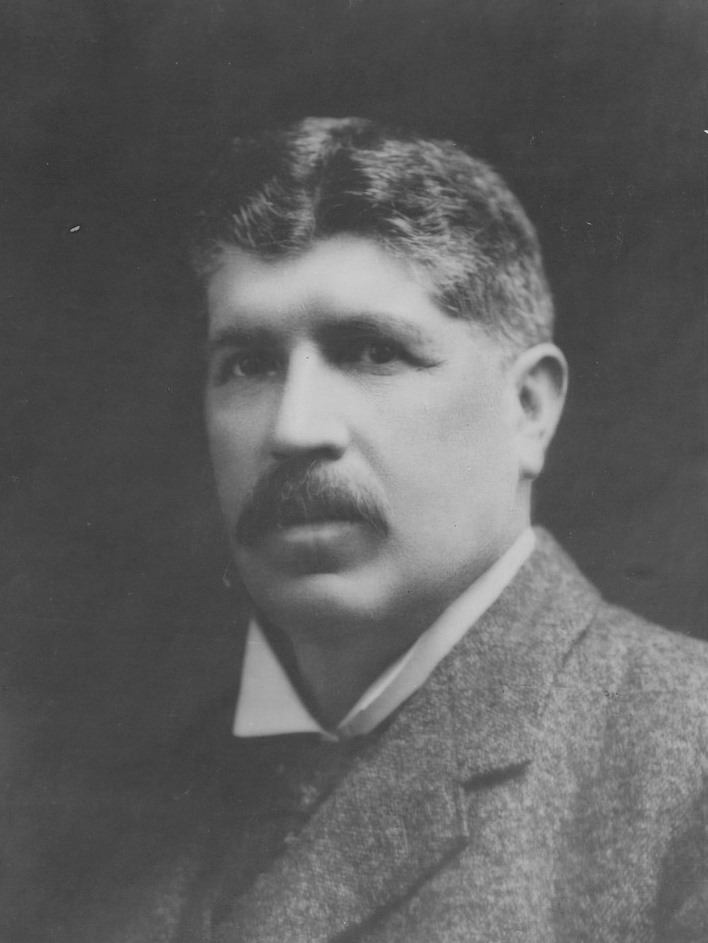

23rd Premier of Victoria
- In office 8 January 1909 – 18 May 1912
- Preceded by: Thomas Bent
- Succeeded by: William Watt

Personal details
- Born: 8 July 1851 Koroit, Victoria, British Empire
- Died: 4 May 1916 (aged 64) Warrnambool, Victoria, Australia
- Spouse: Alice Bateman

John (Jack) Murray (8 July 1851 – 4 May 1916) was an Australian politician who was the 23rd premier of Victoria from 1909 to 1912.

== Biography ==
Murray was born near Koroit, Victoria, the son of James Murray (died 1885) and his wife Isabella (née Gordon), both Scottish immigrants. When Murray was a child his parents settled on a farm, Glenample station, at Port Campbell in the Western District of Victoria. Murray attended Allansford National School and, from 1868, Henry Kemmis's Warrnambool Grammar School. Murray inherited the farm and lived there all his life. On 4 April 1888 Murray married Alice Jane Bateman at Warrnambool, eventually having six children.

A typical rural conservative, he was Chief Secretary and Minister for Labour in the government of William Irvine from 1902 to 1904, and President of the Board of Land and Works and Commissioner of Crown Lands in the government of Thomas Bent from 1904 to 1906. After 1907, however, Murray emerged as the leader of a country faction of Bent's Liberal Party which opposed his free-spending policies. In January 1909 he successfully moved a motion of no-confidence in Bent's government and succeeded him as Premier, also becoming Chief Secretary and Minister for Labour.

Murray was chief secretary in 1902-04 and from 1909 formal chairman of the Board for the Protection of Aborigines.

Although the Labor Party won the 1910 federal elections, it remained much weaker in Victoria than in other states, and at the 1911 state elections Murray's Liberals were re-elected with 43 seats to Labor's 20. But conflict between rural and urban factions of the Liberal Party remained chronic, with the urban leader William Watt undermining Murray just as Murray had undermined Bent. By May 1912 Murray had had enough and resigned. He then accepted office as Chief Secretary in Watt's government from 1912 to 1913 and again from 1913 to 1915. Murray died in Warrnambool on 4 May 1916 after his trap-pony had bolted.

Victorian Legislative Assembly
Preceded by James Francis	Member for Warrnambool; 1884–1916	Succeeded by James Deany
Political offices
Preceded by Thomas Bent	Premier of Victoria; 1909–1912	Succeeded by William Watt
