= Minister of Railways (Victoria) =

Australian state ministry portfolio

Minister of Railways of Victoria
- Victorian coat of arms

- Flag of Victoria
- Style: The Honourable
- Member of: Parliament; Executive council
- Reports to: Premier
- Nominator: Premier
- Appointer: Governor on the recommendation of the premier
- Term length: At the governor's pleasure
- Precursor: Commissioner of Railways and Roads; Commissioner of Roads and Railways; Commissioner of Railways
- Inaugural holder: Thomas Loader MP
- Formation: 26 November 1860
- Final holder: Wilfrid Kent Hughes MP
- Abolished: 2 April 1935
- Succession: Minister for Roads and Road Safety

The Minister of Railways, formerly Commissioner of Railways, was a minister within the Executive Council of Victoria, Australia.

== Commissioners ==
Order	MP	Ministerial title	Term start	Term end	Time in office	Notes
1	Thomas Loader MP	Commissioner of Railways	26 November 1860	4 December 1860	8 days	
2	William Henry Fancourt Mitchell MLC	Commissioner of Railways and Roads	30 December 1861	27 June 1863	1 year, 179 days	
3	James M Grant MP	Commissioner of Railways and Roads	27 June 1863	5 September 1864	1 year, 70 days	
4	Henry Miller MLC	Commissioner of Railways and Roads	18 July 1866	16 January 1867	182 days	
5	John MacGregor MP	Commissioner of Railways and Roads	21 January 1867	4 March 1867	42 days	
6	James Sullivan MP	Commissioner of Railways and Roads	4 March 1867	6 May 1868	1 year, 63 days	
7	Charles Jones MP	Commissioner of Roads and Railways	11 July 1868	9 March 1869	241 days	
(6)	James Sullivan MP	Commissioner of Roads and Railways	12 April 1869	2 September 1869	143 days	
8	William Wilson MP	Commissioner of Railways and Roads	2 September 1869	20 September 1869	18 days	
9	Francis Longmore MP	Commissioner of Railways and Roads	20 September 1869	9 April 1870	201 days	
(8)	William Wilson MP	Commissioner of Railways and Roads	9 April 1870	19 June 1871	1 year, 71 days	
(9)	Francis Longmore MP	Commissioner of Railways and Roads	19 June 1871	10 June 1872	357 days	
10	Duncan Gillies MP	Commissioner of Roads and Railways	10 June 1872	7 August 1875	3 years, 58 days	
11	John Woods MP	Commissioner of Roads and Railways	7 August 1875	20 October 1875	74 days	
12	Joseph Jones MP	Commissioner of Roads and Railways	20 October 1875	21 May 1877	1 year, 213 days	
(11)	John Woods MP	Commissioner of Roads and Railways	22 May 1877	5 March 1880	2 years, 288 days	
(10)	Duncan Gillies MP	Commissioner of Railways	5 March 1880	3 August 1880	151 days	
13	James Patterson MP	Commissioner of Railways	3 August 1880	9 July 1881	340 days	
14	Thomas Bent MP	Commissioner of Railways	9 July 1881	8 March 1883	1 year, 242 days	
(10)	Duncan Gillies MP	Commissioner of Railways	8 March 1883	18 February 1886	2 years, 347 days	

== Ministers ==
Order	MP	Party affiliation	Ministerial title	Term start	Term end	Time in office	Notes
	Duncan Gillies MP		Minister of Railways	18 February 1886	5 November 1890	4 years, 260 days	
	William Shiels MP		Minister of Railways	5 November 1890	16 February 1892	1 year, 103 days	
	James Wheeler MP		Minister of Railways	16 February 1892	23 January 1893	342 days	
	James Patterson MP		Minister of Railways	23 January 1893	14 August 1893	203 days	
	Richard Richardson MP		Minister of Railways	14 August 1893	27 September 1894	1 year, 44 days	
	Henry Roberts Williams MP		Minister of Railways	27 September 1894	5 December 1899	5 years, 69 days	
	Alfred Richard Outtrim MP		Minister of Railways	5 December 1899	19 November 1900	349 days	
	William Trenwith MP		Minister of Railways	19 November 1900	10 June 1902	1 year, 203 days	
	William Shiels MP	Reform	Minister of Railways	10 June 1902	21 July 1903	1 year, 41 days	
	Thomas Bent MP	Reform	Minister of Railways	21 July 1903	8 January 1909	5 years, 171 days	
	Alfred Billson MP	Commonwealth Liberal	Minister of Railways	8 January 1909	18 May 1912	3 years, 131 days	
	Peter McBride MP	Commonwealth Liberal	Minister of Railways	18 May 1912	19 February 1913	277 days	
	Alfred Billson MP	Commonwealth Liberal	Minister of Railways	19 February 1913	9 December 1913	293 days	
	John Billson MP	Labor	Minister of Railways	9 December 1913	22 December 1913	13 days	
	Donald Mackinnon MP	Commonwealth Liberal	Minister of Railways	22 December 1913	9 November 1915	1 year, 322 days	
	Hugh McKenzie MP	Commonwealth Liberal	Minister of Railways	9 November 1915	29 November 1917	2 years, 20 days	
	Agar Wynne MP	Nationalist	Minister of Railways	29 November 1917	21 March 1918	112 days	
	Samuel Barnes MP	Nationalist	Minister of Railways	21 March 1918	7 September 1923	5 years, 170 days	
	Francis Old MP	Country	Minister of Railways	7 September 1923	19 March 1924	194 days	
	Frederic Eggleston MP	Nationalist	Minister of Railways	19 March 1924	18 July 1924	121 days	
	Edmond Hogan MP	Labor	Minister of Railways	18 July 1924	18 November 1924	123 days	
	Frederic Eggleston MP	Nationals	Minister of Railways	18 November 1924	20 May 1927	2 years, 183 days	
	Thomas Tunnecliffe MP	Labor	Minister of Railways	20 May 1927	22 November 1928	1 year, 186 days	
	Frank Groves MP	Nationalist	Minister of Railways	22 November 1928	10 December 1929	1 year, 18 days	
	Henry Beardmore MP	Nationalist	Minister of Railways	10 December 1929	12 December 1929	2 days	
	John Cain MP	Labor	Minister of Railways	12 December 1929	19 May 1932	2 years, 159 days	
	Robert Menzies MP	United Australia Party	Minister of Railways	19 May 1932	25 July 1934	2 years, 67 days	
	Wilfrid Kent Hughes MP	United Australia Party	Minister of Railways	25 July 1934	2 April 1935	251 days	
