= Minister of Immigration (Victoria) =

Australian state ministry portfolio

Minister of Immigration of Victoria
- Victorian coat of arms

- Flag of Victoria
- Style: The Honourable
- Member of: Parliament; Executive council
- Reports to: Premier
- Nominator: Premier
- Appointer: Governor on the recommendation of the premier
- Term length: At the governor's pleasure
- Inaugural holder: David Oman MP
- Formation: 8 May 1923
- Final holder: Peter Spyker MP
- Abolished: 2 May 1985

The Minister of Immigration was a ministry portfolio within the Executive Council of Victoria. It was later known as the Minister of Immigration and Ethnic Affairs.

== Ministers ==
Order	MP	Party affiliation	Ministerial title	Term start	Term end	Time in office	Notes
1	David Oman MP	Nationalist	Minister of Immigration	8 May 1923	7 September 1923	122 days	
2	John Allan MP	Country	Minister of Immigration	7 September 1923	19 March 1924	194 days	
(1)	David Oman MP	Nationalist	Minister of Immigration	19 March 1924	18 July 1924	121 days	
3	John Jones MLC	Labor	Minister in charge of Immigration	18 July 1924	18 November 1924	123 days	
4	Alfred Downward MP	Country	Minister of Immigration	18 November 1924	20 May 1927	2 years, 183 days	
(3)	John Jones MLC	Labor	Minister in charge of Immigration	20 May 1927	22 November 1928	1 year, 186 days	
5	John Pennington MP	Nationalist	Minister of Markets and Immigration	22 November 1928	12 December 1929	1 year, 20 days	
(3)	John Jones MLC	Labor	Minister in charge of Immigration	12 December 1929	26 April 1932	2 years, 136 days	
6	Robert Williams MLC	Labor	Minister in charge of Immigration	26 April 1932	19 May 1932	23 days	
(3)	John Jones MLC	United Australia	Minister in charge of Immigration	19 May 1932	2 April 1935	2 years, 318 days	
7	George Goudie MLC	Country	Minister in charge of Immigration	2 April 1935	14 September 1943	8 years, 165 days	
8	Keith Dodgshun MP	Country	Minister in charge of Immigration	27 June 1950	28 October 1952	2 years, 123 days	
9	Alexander Dennett MP	Electoral Reform	Minister in charge of Immigration	28 October 1952	31 October 1952	3 days	
(8)	Keith Dodgshun MP	Country	Minister in charge of Immigration	31 October 1952	17 December 1952	47 days	
10	William Slater MLC	Labor	Minister in charge of Immigration	17 December 1952	7 June 1955	2 years, 172 days	
11	William Leggatt MP	Liberal and Country	Minister of Immigration	7 June 1955	14 February 1956	252 days	
12	Robert Whately MP	Liberal and Country	Minister of Immigration	14 February 1956	17 March 1956	32 days	
13	Gilbert Chandler MLC	Liberal and Country	Minister of Immigration	21 March 1956	10 April 1956	20 days	
14	Horace Petty MP	Liberal and Country	Minister of Immigration	10 April 1956	9 January 1962	5 years, 274 days	
15	Edward Meagher MP	Liberal and Country	Minister of Immigration	9 January 1962	5 September 1962	239 days	
16	Rupert Hamer MLC	Liberal and Country	Minister of Immigration	5 September 1962	27 June 1964	1 year, 296 days	
17	Vernon Wilcox MP	Liberal and Country	Minister of Immigration	27 June 1964	1 December 1965	1 year, 157 days	
18	George Reid MP	Liberal	Minister of Immigration	9 May 1967	15 December 1970	3 years, 220 days	
19	Pat Dickie MLC	Liberal	Minister of Immigration	15 December 1970	23 August 1972	1 year, 252 days	
20	Murray Byrne MLC	Liberal	Minister of Immigration	23 August 1972	31 March 1976	3 years, 221 days	
21	Walter Jona MP	Liberal	Minister of Immigration and Ethnic Affairs	31 March 1976	16 May 1979	3 years, 46 days	
22	Alan Wood MP	Liberal	Minister of Immigration and Ethnic Affairs	16 May 1979	17 February 1981	1 year, 277 days	
23	Jeff Kennett MP	Liberal	Minister of Immigration and Ethnic Affairs	17 February 1981	8 April 1982	1 year, 50 days	
24	Jack Ginifer MP	Labor	Minister of Immigration and Ethnic Affairs	8 April 1982	10 May 1982	32 days	
25	Peter Spyker MP	Labor	Minister of Immigration and Ethnic Affairs	10 May 1982	2 May 1985	2 years, 357 days	
