= Chief Secretary of Victoria =

- Victorian coat of arms

- Flag of Victoria
- Style: The Honourable
- Member of: Parliament; Executive council
- Reports to: Premier
- Nominator: Premier
- Appointer: Governor; on the recommendation of the premier
- Term length: At the governor's pleasure
- Inaugural holder: William Lonsdale
- Formation: 1851
- Final holder: Lindsay Thompson
- Abolished: 1980

The Chief Secretary was a minister within the Executive Council of Victoria responsible for a various areas.

The position was created in 1851, prior to the granting of self-government, under the title Colonial Secretary. The position was abolished in 1980.

== Ministers ==
Order	Minister	Party affiliation	Ministerial title	Term start	Term end	Time in office	Notes
	William Lonsdale	Independent	Colonial Secretary	15 July 1851	20 July 1853	2 years, 5 days	
	John Foster	Independent	Colonial Secretary	20 July 1853	4 December 1854	1 year, 137 days	
	William Haines MP	Independent	Colonial Secretary	12 December 1854	28 November 1855	2 years, 89 days	
	William Haines MP	Independent	Chief Secretary	28 November 1855	11 March 1857	2 years, 89 days	
	John O'Shanassy MP	Independent	Chief Secretary	11 March 1857	29 April 1857	49 days	
	William Haines MP	Independent	Chief Secretary	29 April 1857	10 March 1858	315 days	
	John O'Shanassy MP	Independent	Chief Secretary	10 March 1858	27 October 1859	1 year, 231 days	
	William Nicholson MP	Independent	Chief Secretary	27 October 1859	26 November 1860	1 year, 30 days	
	Richard Heales MP	Independent	Chief Secretary	26 November 1860	14 November 1861	353 days	
	John O'Shanassy MP	Independent	Chief Secretary	14 November 1861	27 June 1863	1 year, 225 days	
	James McCulloch MP	Independent	Chief Secretary	27 June 1863	6 May 1868	4 years, 314 days	
	Charles Sladen MLC	Independent	Chief Secretary	6 May 1868	11 July 1868	66 days	
	James McCulloch MP	Independent	Chief Secretary	11 July 1868	20 September 1869	1 year, 71 days	
	John A Macpherson MP	Independent	Chief Secretary	20 September 1869	9 April 1870	201 days	
	James McCulloch MP	Independent	Chief Secretary	9 April 1870	19 June 1871	1 year, 71 days	
	Charles Gavan Duffy MP	Independent	Chief Secretary	19 June 1871	10 June 1872	357 days	
	James G Francis MP	Independent	Chief Secretary	10 June 1872	31 July 1874	2 years, 51 days	
	Graham Berry MP	Independent	Chief Secretary	10 August 1875	20 October 1875	71 days	
	John A Macpherson MP	Independent	Chief Secretary	20 October 1875	21 May 1877	1 year, 213 days	
	Graham Berry MP	Independent	Chief Secretary	21 May 1877	5 March 1880	2 years, 289 days	
	Robert Ramsay MP	Independent	Chief Secretary	5 March 1880	3 August 1880	151 days	
	Graham Berry MP	Independent	Chief Secretary	3 August 1880	9 July 1881	340 days	
	James M Grant MP	Independent	Chief Secretary	9 July 1881	8 March 1883	1 year, 242 days	
	Graham Berry MP	Independent	Chief Secretary	8 March 1883	16 February 1886	2 years, 345 days	
	Alfred Deakin MP	Independent	Chief Secretary	18 February 1886	5 November 1890	4 years, 260 days	
	George D Langridge MP	Independent	Chief Secretary	5 November 1890	24 March 1891	139 days	
	John M Davies MLC	Independent	Chief Secretary	24 March 1891	11 April 1891	18 days	
	Allan McLean MP	Independent	Chief Secretary	11 April 1891	23 January 1893	1 year, 287 days	
	James Patterson MP	Independent	Chief Secretary	23 January 1893	27 September 1894	1 year, 247 days	
	Alexander Peacock MP	Independent	Chief Secretary	27 September 1894	5 December 1899	5 years, 69 days	
	Allan McLean MP	Independent	Chief Secretary	5 December 1899	19 November 1900	349 days	
	Alexander Peacock MP	Independent	Chief Secretary	19 November 1900	12 February 1901	85 days	
	William Trenwith MP	Independent	Chief Secretary	4 June 1901	10 June 1902	1 year, 6 days	
	John Murray MP	Reform	Chief Secretary	10 June 1902	19 February 1904	1 year, 254 days	
	Samuel Gillott MP	Reform	Chief Secretary	19 February 1904	4 December 1906	2 years, 288 days	
	John Mackey MP	Reform	Chief Secretary	11 December 1906	4 January 1907	24 days	
	Thomas Langdon MP	Reform	Chief Secretary	4 January 1907	22 February 1907	49 days	
	Alexander Peacock MP	Reform	Chief Secretary	22 February 1907	20 October 1908	1 year, 241 days	
	John Mackey MP	Reform	Chief Secretary	31 October 1908	8 January 1909	69 days	
	John Murray MP	Commonwealth Liberal	Chief Secretary	8 January 1909	9 December 1913	4 years, 335 days	
	George Prendergast MP	Labor	Chief Secretary	9 December 1913	22 December 1913	13 days	
	John Murray MP	Commonwealth Liberal	Chief Secretary	22 December 1913	9 November 1915	1 year, 322 days	
	Donald McLeod MP	Commonwealth Liberal	Chief Secretary	9 November 1915	29 November 1917	2 years, 20 days	
	John Bowser MP	Nationalist	Chief Secretary	29 November 1917	7 July 1919	1 year, 220 days	
	Matthew Baird MP	Nationalist	Chief Secretary	7 July 1919	7 September 1923	4 years, 62 days	
	Stanley Argyle MP	Nationalist	Chief Secretary	7 September 1923	18 July 1924	315 days	
	Thomas Tunnecliffe MP	Labor	Chief Secretary	18 July 1924	18 November 1924	123 days	
	Stanley Argyle MP	Nationalist	Chief Secretary	18 November 1924	20 May 1927	2 years, 183 days	
	George Prendergast MP	Labor	Chief Secretary	20 May 1927	22 November 1928	1 year, 186 days	
	Stanley Argyle MP	Nationalist	Chief Secretary	22 November 1928	12 December 1929	1 year, 20 days	
	Thomas Tunnecliffe MP	Labor	Chief Secretary	12 December 1929	19 May 1932	2 years, 159 days	
	Ian Macfarlan MP	United Australia Party	Chief Secretary	19 May 1932	2 April 1935	2 years, 318 days	
	Murray Bourchier MP	United Country	Chief Secretary	2 April 1935	22 June 1936	1 year, 81 days	
	Henry Bailey MP	United Country	Chief Secretary	22 June 1936	14 September 1943	7 years, 84 days	
	Herbert Cremean MP	Labor	Chief Secretary	14 September 1943	18 September 1943	4 days	
	Herbert Hyland MP	United Country	Chief Secretary	18 September 1943	2 October 1945	2 years, 14 days	
	Thomas Maltby MP	Liberal	Chief Secretary	2 October 1945	21 November 1945	50 days	
	Bill Slater MP	Labor	Chief Secretary	21 November 1945	20 November 1947	1 year, 364 days	
	Keith Dodgshun MP	United Country	Chief Secretary	20 November 1947	3 December 1948	1 year, 13 days	
	Wilfrid Kent Hughes MP	Liberal	Chief Secretary	3 December 1948	8 December 1948	5 days	
	William Leggatt MP	Liberal	Chief Secretary	8 December 1948	19 June 1950	1 year, 193 days	
	Trevor Oldham MP	Liberal	Chief Secretary	19 June 1950	27 June 1950	8 days	
	Keith Dodgshun MP	Country	Chief Secretary	27 June 1950	28 October 1952	2 years, 123 days	
	Alexander Dennett MP	Electoral Reform League	Chief Secretary	28 October 1952	31 October 1952	3 days	
	Keith Dodgshun MP	Country	Chief Secretary	31 October 1952	17 December 1952	47 days	
	Bill Galvin MP	Labor	Chief Secretary	17 December 1952	7 June 1955	2 years, 172 days	
	Arthur Rylah MP	Liberal Country Party	Chief Secretary	7 June 1955	5 March 1971	15 years, 271 days	
	George Reid MP	Liberal Country Party	Chief Secretary	5 March 1971	29 April 1971	55 days	
	Rupert Hamer MLC	Liberal Country Party	Chief Secretary	29 April 1971	23 August 1972	1 year, 116 days	
	Edward Meagher MP	Liberal	Chief Secretary	23 August 1972	30 May 1973	280 days	
	John Rossiter MP	Liberal	Chief Secretary	30 May 1973	31 March 1976	2 years, 306 days	
	Pat Dickie MLC	Liberal	Chief Secretary	31 March 1976	16 August 1978	2 years, 138 days	
	Joe Rafferty MP	Liberal	Chief Secretary	18 August 1978	4 April 1979	229 days	
	Haddon Storey MLC	Liberal	Chief Secretary	4 April 1979	16 May 1979	42 days	
	Lindsay Thompson MP	Liberal	Chief Secretary	16 May 1979	3 September 1980	1 year, 110 days	
