= Bracks ministry =

Bracks Ministry
- 65th ministry of Victoria, Australia
- Date formed: 20 October 1999
- Date dissolved: 3 August 2007

People and organisations
- Monarch: Queen Elizabeth II
- Governor: Sir James Gobbo (until 31 December 2000); John Landy (1 January 2001 to 7 April 2006); David de Kretser (since 7 April 2006)
- Premier: Steve Bracks
- Deputy premier: John Thwaites
- No. of ministers: 20
- Member party: Labor
- Status in legislature: Minority government (until 2002 state election); Majority government (since 2002 state election)
- Opposition party: Liberal–National Coalition
- Opposition leader: Denis Napthine (until 20 August 2002); Robert Doyle (20 August 2002 to 8 May 2006); Ted Baillieu (since 8 May 2006)

History
- Elections: 1999 state election 2002 state election 2006 state election
- Predecessor: Kennett ministry
- Successor: Brumby ministry

The Bracks Ministry was the 65th ministry of the Government of Victoria. It was led by the Premier of Victoria, Steve Bracks, and Deputy Premier, John Thwaites. It succeeded the Kennett Ministry on 20 October 1999, following the defeat of Jeff Kennett's Liberal government in the 1999 state election. The ministry dissolved as a result of the retirement of Bracks and Thwaites and was replaced by the Brumby ministry led by new Labor leader John Brumby.

There were three reshuffles within the Bracks Ministry. The first took place on 12 February 2002.

== Cabinet ==
Minister	Portfolios
Steve Bracks, MLA/MP	Premier; Treasurer (until 11 February 2002); Minister for Multicultural Affairs; Minister for Veterans' Affairs (from 1 December 2006)
John Thwaites, MLA/MP	Deputy Premier; Minister for Health (until 1 December 2006); Minister for Planning (until 11 February 2002); Minister for Water, Environment and Climate Change (from 1 December 2006)
Monica Gould, MLC	Leader in the Legislative Council; Minister for Industrial Relations (until 11 February 2002); Minister assisting the Minister for WorkCover (until 11 February 2002); Minister for Education Services and Youth Affairs (12 February 2002 to 25 January 2005)
Jacinta Allan, MLA/MP	Minister for Education Services and Youth Affairs (from 5 December 2002 until 1 December 2006); Minister for Skills, Education Services and Employment (from 1 December 2006); Minister for Women's Affairs (from 1 December 2006)
Peter Batchelor, MLA/MP	Minister of Transport (until 1 December 2006); Minister for Major Projects (12 February 2002 to 1 December 2006); Minister for Victorian Communities (from 1 December 2006); Minister for Energy and Resources (from 1 December 2006)
Candy Broad, MLC	Minister for Energy and Resources (until 1 December 2006); Minister for Ports (until 1 December 2006); Minister assisting the Minister for State and Regional Development (until 11 February 2002)
John Brumby, MLA/MP	Treasurer (from 12 February 2002); Minister for State and Regional Development (until 1 December 2006); Minister for Finance (until 1 December 2006); Minister for Innovation (from 12 February 2002); Minister for Regional and Rural Development (from 1 December 2006); Assistant Treasurer (until 11 February 2002)
Bob Cameron, MLA/MP	Minister for Local Government (until 1 December 2006); Minister for WorkCover (until 5 December 2002); Minister assisting the Minister of Transport regarding Roads (until 11 February 2002); Minister for Police and Emergency Services (from 1 December 2006); Minister for Corrections (from 1 December 2006)
Christine Campbell, MLA/MP	Minister for Community Development (until 1 December 2006); Minister for Senior Victorians (12 February 2002 to 5 December 2002)
Mary Delahunty, MLA/MP	Minister for Education (until 1 December 2006); Minister for Arts (until 1 December 2006); Minister for Planning (12 February 2002 to 25 January 2005); Minister for Women's Affairs (12 February 2002) to 1 December 2006); Minister for the Arts (25 January 2005 to 1 December 2006)
Sherryl Garbutt, MLA/MP	Minister for Environment and Conservation (until 1 December 2006); Minister for Women's Affairs (until 11 February 2002)
Andre Haermeyer, MLA/MP	Minister for Police and Emergency Services (until 25 January 2005); Minister for Corrections (until 25 January 2005); Minister for Small Business (from 25 January 2005); Minister for Manufacturing and Export (from 25 January 2005); Minister for Financial Services (from 25 January 2005)
Keith Hamilton, MLA/MP	Minister for Agriculture (until 1 December 2006); Minister for Aboriginal Affairs (until 1 December 2006)
Rob Hulls, MLA/MP	Attorney-General; Minister for Manufacturing Industry (until 5 December 2002); Minister for Racing; Minister for WorkCover (5 December 2002 to 25 January 2005); Minister for Planning (25 January 2005 to 1 December 2006); Minister for Industrial Relations (from 1 December 2006)
Lynne Kosky, MLA/MP	Minister for Post Compulsory Education, Training and Employment (until 1 December 2006); Minister for Public Transport (from 1 December 2006); Minister for the Arts (from 1 December 2006)
John Lenders, MLA/MP	Minister for Finance (12 February 2002 to 1 December 2006); Minister for Industrial Relations (12 February 2002 to 1 December 2006); Minister for Consumer Affairs (5 December 2002 to 25 January 2005); Minister for Major Projects (25 January 2005 to 1 December 2006); Minister for WorkCover (25 January 2005 to 1 December 2006); Minister for Education (from 1 December 2006)
Justin Madden, MLC	Minister for Sport and Recreation (until 1 December 2006); Minister for Commonwealth Games (12 February 2002 to 1 December 2006); Minister for Youth Affairs (until 11 February 2002); Minister assisting the Minister for Planning (until 11 February 2002); Minister for Planning (from 1 December 2006)
John Pandazopoulos, MLA/MP	Minister for Gaming (until 1 December 2006); Minister for Major Projects (until 11 February 2002) and Tourism; Minister assisting the Premier on Multicultural Affairs (until 1 December 2006)
Bronwyn Pike, MLA/MP	Minister for Housing (until 1 December 2006); Minister for Community Services (12 February 2002 to 1 December 2006); Minister for Aged Care (11 February 2002 to 1 December 2006); Minister assisting the Minister for Health (until 11 February 2002); Minister Assisting the Premier on Community Building (from 12 February 2002); Minister for Health (from 1 December 2006)
Marsha Thomson, MLC	Minister for Small Business (until 25 January 2005); Minister for Information and Communication Technology (12 February 2002 to 1 December 2006); Minister for Consumer Affairs (until 11 February 2002; 25 January 2005 to 1 December 2006)
Tim Holding, MLA/MP	Minister for Manufacturing and Export (5 December 2002 to 25 January 2005); Minister for Financial Services Industry (5 December 2002 to 25 January 2005); Minister for Police and Emergency Services (25 January 2005 to 1 December 2006); Minister for Corrections (25 January 2005 to 1 December 2006); Minister for Finance (from 1 December 2006); Minister for WorkCover and the Transport Accident Commission (from 1 December 2006); Minister for Tourism (from 1 December 2006); Minister for Information and Communication Technology (from 1 December 2006)
Daniel Andrews, MLA/MP	Minister for Gaming (from 1 December 2006); Minister for Consumer Affairs (from 1 December 2006); Minister for assisting the Premier on Multicultural Affairs (from 1 December 2006)
Joe Helper, MLP/MP	Minister for Agriculture (from 1 December 2006)
Gavin Jennings, MLA/MP	Minister for Community Services (from 1 December 2006); Minister for Aboriginal Affairs (from 1 December 2006); Minister for Aged Care (from 5 December 2002)
James Merlino, MLA/MP	Minister for Sport, Recreation and Youth Affairs (from 1 December 2006)
Lisa Neville, MLA/MP	Minister for Mental Health (from 1 December 2006); Minister for Children (from 1 December 2006); Minister for Aged Care (from 1 December 2006)
Tim Pallas, MLA/MP	Minister for Roads and Ports (from 1 December 2006)
Theo Theophanous, MLA/MP	Minister for Industry and State Development (from 1 December 2006); Minister for Major Projects (from 1 December 2006); Minister for Small Business (from 1 December 2006)
Richard Wynne, MLA/MP	Minister for Housing (from 1 December 2006); Minister for Local Government (from 1 December 2006)

Parliament of Victoria
Preceded by Kennett Ministry	Bracks Ministry; 1999–2007	Succeeded by Brumby Ministry
