= Baillieu ministry =

67th ministry of Victoria, Australia

Baillieu Ministry
- 67th ministry of Victoria, Australia
- Date formed: 2 December 2010
- Date dissolved: 6 March 2013

People and organisations
- Monarch: Elizabeth II
- Governor: David de Kretser (until 7 April 2011); Alex Chernov (since 7 April 2011)
- Premier: Ted Baillieu
- Deputy premier: Peter Ryan
- No. of ministers: 23
- Member party: Liberal–National Coalition
- Status in legislature: Majority government
- Opposition party: Labor
- Opposition leader: Daniel Andrews

History
- Election: 2010 state election
- Predecessor: Brumby ministry
- Successor: Napthine ministry

The Baillieu Ministry was the 67th ministry of the Government of Victoria. It was a Liberal–National Coalition Government led by the Premier of Victoria, Ted Baillieu, and Deputy Premier, Peter Ryan. It succeeded the Brumby Ministry on 2 December 2010, following the defeat of the Labor government at the 2010 state election, at which the Coalition won 45 Legislative Assembly seats to Labor's 43.

The Baillieu Ministry comprised 23 members, 6 of which were members of the Victorian Legislative Council and 17 were members of the Victorian Legislative Assembly. Five were members of the National Party and four were women.

On 6 March 2013, Baillieu resigned as Liberal leader and therefore as Premier. Denis Napthine was voted the new leader of the party and became Premier.

== Ministry ==
Blue entries indicate members of the Liberal Party, and green entries indicate members of the National Party.

Party	Minister	Portfolios
Liberal	Ted Baillieu MP	Premier; Minister for the Arts
National	Peter Ryan, MP	Deputy Premier; Minister for Police and Emergency Services; Minister for Rural and Regional Development; Minister for Bushfire Response
Liberal	Kim Wells, MP	Treasurer
Liberal	Louise Asher, MP	Minister for Tourism and Major Events; Minister for Innovation, Services and Small Business
Liberal	Robert Clark, MP	Attorney-General; Minister for Finance
Liberal	Richard Dalla-Riva, MLC	Minister for Employment and Industrial Relations; Minister for Manufacturing, Exports and Trade
Liberal	David Davis, MLC	Minister for Health; Minister for Ageing
National	Hugh Delahunty, MP	Minister for Sport and Recreation; Minister for Veterans' Affairs
Liberal	Martin Dixon, MP	Minister for Education
Liberal	Matthew Guy, MLC	Minister for Planning
National	Peter Hall, MLC	Minister for Higher Education and Skills; Minister Responsible for the Teaching Profession
Liberal	Nicholas Kotsiras, MLC	Minister for Multicultural Affairs and Citizenship
Liberal	Wendy Lovell, MLC	Minister for Housing; Minister for Children and Early Childhood Development
Liberal	Andrew McIntosh, MP	Minister for Corrections; Minister for Crime Prevention; Minister responsible for the establishment of an anti-corruption commission
Liberal	Terry Mulder, MP	Minister for Roads; Minister for Public Transport
Liberal	Denis Napthine, MP	Minister for Ports; Minister for Regional Cities; Minister for Racing; Minister for Major Projects
Liberal	Michael O'Brien, MP	Minister for Gaming; Minister for Consumer Affairs; Minister for Energy and Resources
National	Jeanette Powell, MP	Minister for Local Government; Minister for Aboriginal Affairs
Liberal	Gordon Rich-Phillips, MLC	Assistant Treasurer; Minister for Technology; Minister responsible for the Aviation Industry
Liberal	Ryan Smith, MP	Minister for Environment and Climate Change; Minister for Youth Affairs
National	Peter Walsh, MP	Minister for Agriculture and Food Security; Minister for Water (Victoria)
Liberal	Mary Wooldridge, MP	Minister for Mental Health; Minister for Women's Affairs; Minister for Community Services

Parliament of Victoria
Preceded by Brumby Ministry	Baillieu Ministry; 2010–2013	Succeeded by Napthine Ministry
