= Napthine ministry =

68th ministry of Victoria, Australia

Napthine Ministry
- 68th ministry of Victoria, Australia
- Date formed: 6 March 2013
- Date dissolved: 4 December 2014

People and organisations
- Monarch: Elizabeth II
- Governor: Alex Chernov
- Premier: Denis Napthine
- Deputy premier: Peter Ryan
- No. of ministers: 22
- Member party: Liberal–National Coalition
- Status in legislature: Majority government
- Opposition party: Labor
- Opposition leader: Daniel Andrews

History
- Predecessor: Baillieu ministry
- Successor: First Andrews ministry

The Napthine Ministry was the 68th ministry of the Government of Victoria. It was a Liberal–National Coalition Government, led by the Premier of Victoria, Denis Napthine, and Deputy Premier, Peter Ryan. It succeeded the Baillieu Ministry on 6 March 2013, following the resignation of Ted Baillieu from the Liberal Party leadership, and the election of Denis Napthine as Liberal Party leader and Premier. The Napthine Ministry consisted of 22 Ministers, most of which held multiple portfolios.

Napthine reshuffled his cabinet on 17 March 2014, after the announced retirements of Jeanette Powell, Hugh Delahunty, Nicholas Kotsiras and Peter Hall. After the defeat of the Napthine government at the 2014 state election, Daniel Andrews of the Australian Labor Party formed the First Andrews Ministry on 4 December 2014.

== Ministry ==
Party	Minister	Portfolio
Liberal	Denis Napthine MP	Premier; Minister for the Arts (until 13 March 2013); Minister for Ports (until 13 March 2013); Minister for Major Projects (until 13 March 2013); Minister for Regional Cities; Minister for Racing
National	Peter Ryan MP	Deputy Premier; Minister for Rural and Regional Development; Minister for State Development (from 13 March 2013); Minister for Police and Emergency Services (until 13 March 2013); Minister for Bushfire Response (until 13 March 2013)
Liberal	Kim Wells MP	Minister for Police and Emergency Services (from 13 March 2013); Minister for Bushfire Response (from 13 March 2013); Treasurer (until 13 March 2013)
Liberal	Louise Asher MP	Minister for Tourism and Major Events; Minister for Innovation, Services and Small Business (until 17 March 2014); Minister for Innovation (from 17 March 2014); Minister for Employment and Trade (from 13 March 2013)
Liberal	Robert Clark MP	Attorney-General; Minister for Finance; Minister for Industrial Relations (from 13 March 2013)
Liberal	Richard Dalla-Riva MLC (until 13 March 2013)	Minister for Employment and Industrial Relations; Minister for Manufacturing, Exports and Trade
Liberal	David Davis MLC	Minister for Health; Minister for Ageing
National	Hugh Delahunty MP (until 17 March 2014)	Minister for Sport and Recreation; Minister for Veterans' Affairs
Liberal	Martin Dixon MP	Minister for Education
Liberal	Matthew Guy MLC	Minister for Planning; Minister for Multicultural Affairs and Citizenship (from 17 March 2014)
National	Peter Hall MLC (until 17 March 2014)	Minister for Higher Education and Skills; Minister Responsible for the Teaching Profession
Liberal	Nicholas Kotsiras MLC (until 17 March 2014)	Minister for Multicultural Affairs and Citizenship; Minister for Energy and Resources (from 13 March 2013)
Liberal	Wendy Lovell MLC	Minister for Housing; Minister for Children and Early Childhood Development
Liberal	Andrew McIntosh MP (until 16 April 2013)	Minister for Corrections; Minister for Crime Prevention; Minister responsible for the establishment of an anti-corruption commission (until 13 March 2013); Minister responsible for IBAC (from 13 March 2013); Minister for Gaming Regulation
Liberal	Edward O'Donohue MLC (from 22 April 2013)	Minister for Liquor and Gaming Regulation; Minister for Corrections; Minister for Crime Prevention
Liberal	Terry Mulder MP	Minister for Roads; Minister for Public Transport
Liberal	Michael O'Brien MP	Treasurer (from 13 March 2013); Minister for Gaming (until 13 March 2013); Minister for Consumer Affairs (until 13 March 2013); Minister for Energy and Resources (until 13 March 2013)
National	Jeanette Powell MP (until 17 March 2014)	Minister for Local Government; Minister for Aboriginal Affairs
Liberal	Gordon Rich-Phillips MLC	Assistant Treasurer; Minister for Technology; Minister responsible for the Aviation Industry
Liberal	Ryan Smith MP	Minister for Environment and Climate Change; Minister for Youth Affairs
National	Peter Walsh MP	Minister for Agriculture and Food Security; Minister for Water (Victoria)
Liberal	Mary Wooldridge MP	Minister for Mental Health; Minister for Community Services; Minister for Women's Affairs (until 13 March 2013); Minister for Disability Services and Reform (from 13 March 2013)
Liberal	David Hodgett MP (from 13 March 2013)	Minister for Ports; Minister for Manufacturing; Minister for Major Projects
Liberal	Heidi Victoria MP (from 13 March 2013)	Minister for the Arts; Minister for Women's Affairs; Minister for Consumer Affairs
National	Tim Bull MP (from 17 March 2014)	Minister for Local Government; Minister for Aboriginal Affairs
National	Damian Drum MLC (from 17 March 2014)	Minister for Sport and Recreation; Minister for Veterans' Affairs
National	Russell Northe MP (from 17 March 2014)	Minister for Energy and Resources; Minister for Small Business
Liberal	Nick Wakeling MP (from 17 March 2014)	Minister for Higher Education and Skills

Parliament of Victoria
Preceded by Baillieu Ministry	Napthine Ministry; 2013–2014	Succeeded by First Andrews Ministry
