= Brumby ministry =

66th ministry of Victoria, Australia

Brumby Ministry
- 66th ministry of Victoria, Australia
- Date formed: 3 August 2007
- Date dissolved: 2 December 2010

People and organisations
- Monarch: Elizabeth II
- Governor: David de Kretser
- Premier: John Brumby
- Deputy premier: Rob Hulls
- No. of ministers: 20
- Member party: Labor
- Status in legislature: Majority government
- Opposition party: Liberal–National Coalition
- Opposition leader: Ted Baillieu

History
- Predecessor: Bracks ministry
- Successor: Baillieu ministry

The Brumby Ministry was the 66th ministry of the Government of Victoria. It was led by the Premier of Victoria, John Brumby, and Deputy Premier, Rob Hulls. It succeeded the Bracks Ministry on 3 August 2007, following the retirement of former Premier Steve Bracks and his deputy John Thwaites. Brumby had been sworn as Premier three days earlier on 30 July; he had temporarily been sworn into Bracks' and Thwaites' portfolios until a reshuffle could be arranged.

The ministry underwent three reshuffles since 2007. The first occurred in December 2008, triggered by the resignation of Theo Theophanous: Martin Pakula was appointed to the resulting vacancy. The second reshuffle occurred on 20 January 2010 after Lynne Kosky's resignation. A new position of Minister for the Respect Agenda was created. Pakula took on Kosky's role as Minister for Public Transport, with Peter Bachelor given the Arts portfolio. Lily D'Ambrosio joined the Cabinet as Minister for Community Development. The third occurred when Bob Cameron resigned on 7 October 2010. James Merlino became Minister for Police and Minister for Corrections in his place, although Cameron retained the Emergency Services portfolio until the November state election in order to finalise key bushfire reforms.

== Portfolios ==
Minister	Office
John Brumby, MP	Premier; Minister for Veterans' Affairs; Minister for Multicultural Affairs
Rob Hulls, MP	Deputy Premier; Attorney-General; Minister for Racing; Minister for Industrial Relations (until 28 December 2008)
John Lenders, MLC	Treasurer; Minister for Information and Communication Technology (from 29 December 2008); Minister for Financial Services (from 29 December 2008)
Jacinta Allan, MP	Minister for Regional and Rural Development; Minister for Industry and Trade (from 20 January 2010)
Daniel Andrews, MP	Minister for Health
Peter Batchelor, MP	Minister for Energy and Resources; Minister for the Arts (from 20 January 2010); Minister for Community Development (until 19 January 2010)
Bob Cameron, MP	Minister for Police and Emergency Services (until 11 October); Minister for Corrections (until 11 October); Minister for Emergency Services (from 11 October)
Lily D'Ambrosio, MP	Minister for Community Development (from 20 January 2010)
Joe Helper, MP	Minister for Agriculture; Minister for Small Business
Tim Holding, MP	Minister for Finance, WorkCover and the Transport Accident Commission; Minister for Water (Victoria); Minister for Tourism and Major Events
Gavin Jennings, MLC	Minister for Environment and Climate Change; Minister for Innovation
Justin Madden, MLC	Minister for Planning; Minister for the Respect Agenda (from 20 January 2010)
James Merlino, MP	Minister for Police (from 11 October); Minister for Corrections (from 11 October); Minister for Sport, Recreation and Youth Affairs; Minister Assisting the Premier on Multicultural Affairs
Maxine Morand, MP	Minister for Children and Early Childhood Development; Minister for Women's Affairs
Lisa Neville, MP	Minister for Mental Health; Minister for Community Services; Minister for Senior Victorians
Martin Pakula, MLC (29 December 2008 to 20 January 2010)	Minister for Public Transport (from 20 January 2010); Minister for Industrial Relations; Minister for Industry and Trade
Tim Pallas, MP	Minister for Roads and Ports; Minister for Major Projects (from 29 October 2008)
Bronwyn Pike, MP	Minister for Education; Minister for Skills and Workforce Participation (from 20 January 2010)
Tony Robinson, MP	Minister for Gaming; Minister for Consumer Affairs; Minister Assisting the Premier on Veterans' Affairs
Richard Wynne, MP	Minister for Housing; Minister for Local Government; Minister for Aboriginal Affairs
Tony Lupton, MP	Cabinet Secretary
Theo Theophanous, MLC (until 28 December 2008)	Minister for Industry and Trade; Minister for Information and Communication Technology; Minister for Major Projects
Lynne Kosky, MP (until 18 January 2010)	Minister for Public Transport; Minister for the Arts

Parliament of Victoria
Preceded by Bracks Ministry	Brumby Ministry; 2007–2010	Succeeded by Baillieu Ministry
