= Kirner ministry =

63rd ministry of the Government of Victoria, Australia

Kirner Ministry
- 63rd ministry of Victoria, Australia
- Date formed: 10 August 1990
- Date dissolved: 6 October 1992

People and organisations
- Monarch: Elizabeth II
- Governor: Davis McCaughey
- Premier: Joan Kirner
- Deputy premier: Jim Kennan
- No. of ministers: 20
- Member party: Labor
- Status in legislature: Majority government
- Opposition party: Liberal–National Coalition
- Opposition leader: Alan Brown (until 23 April 1991); Jeff Kennett (since 23 April 1991)

History
- Predecessor: Cain II ministry
- Successor: Kennett ministry

The Kirner Ministry was the 63rd ministry of the Government of Victoria. It was led by the Premier of Victoria, Joan Kirner, of the Labor Party. The ministry was sworn in on 10 August 1990. The ministry was formed when John Cain resigned from the leadership of the Labor Party and was replaced by Kirner as leader and Premier.

== Ministry ==
Minister	Portfolios
Joan Kirner, MP	Premier; Minister for Ethnic Affairs (until 18 January 1991)
Jim Kennan, MP	Deputy Premier; Attorney-General; Minister for the Arts; Minister for Major Projects (from 18 January 1991)
Ian Baker, MP	Minister for Property and Services (until 18 January 1991); Minister for Agriculture (18 January 1991 to 21 January 1992); Minister for Food and Agriculture (from 21 January 1992)
Steve Crabb, MP	Minister for Tourism; Minister for Conservation and Environment (until 21 January 1992); Minister for Water Resources (from 21 January 1992)
Caroline Hogg, MLC	Minister for Health (until 18 January 1991); Minister for Ethnic, Municipal and Community Affairs (from 18 January 1991)
Maureen Lyster, MLC	Minister for Local Government (until 18 January 1991); Minister for Health (from 18 January 1991)
Andrew McCutcheon, MP	Minister for Planning and Urban Growth (until 18 January 1991); Minister for Planning and Housing (from 18 January 1991)
Brian Mier, MLC	Minister for Consumer Affairs; Minister for Prices (until 18 January 1991); Minister for Aboriginal Affairs (until 15 August 1991)
Neil Pope, MP	Minister for Labour; Minister for Education (from 21 January 1992)
Barry Pullen, MLC	Minister for Education (until 18 January 1991); Minister for Education and Training (18 January 1991 to 21 January 1992); Minister for Conservation and Environment (from 21 January 1992)
Tom Roper, MP	Treasurer (until 21 January 1992); Minister of Aboriginal Affairs (from 15 August 1991); Minister for Post-Secondary Education and Training (from 21 January 1992); Minister for Gaming (from 21 January 1992)
Barry Rowe, MP	Minister for Agriculture and Rural Affairs (until 18 January 1991); Minister for Small Business (18 January 1991 to 16 April 1991)
Mal Sandon, MP	Minister for Police and Emergency Services; Minister for Corrections
Kay Setches, MP	Minister for Community Services
Tony Sheehan, MP	Minister for Housing and Construction (until 18 January 1991); Minister for Finance (18 January 1991 to 21 January 1992); Treasurer (from 21 January 1992)
Peter Spyker, MP	Minister of Transport
Neil Trezise, MP	Minister for Sport and Recreation
David White, MLC	Minister for Industry and Economic Planning (until 18 December 1990); Minister for Major Projects (until 18 January 1991); Minister for Manufacturing and Industry (from 18 January 1991); Minister for Gaming (9 April 1991 to 21 January 1992)
John Harrowfield, MP	Minister for Small Business (16 April 1991 to 21 January 1992); Minister for Finance (from 21 January 1992); Minister Assisting the Minister for Labour on WorkCare (from 21 January 1992)
Theo Theophanous, MLC	Minister for Consumer Affairs (from 15 August 1991); Minister Assisting the Minister for Manufacturing and Industry Development on Major Public Authorities (15 August 1991 to 21 January 1992); Minister for Small Business (from 21 January 1992); Minister Assisting the Minister for Manufacturing and Industry Development on Corporatisation (from 21 January 1992)

Parliament of Victoria
Preceded by Cain Ministry (1982–1990)	Kirner Ministry; 1990–1992	Succeeded by Kennett Ministry
