= Department of Premier and Cabinet (Victoria) =

Department of the government of the State of Victoria, Australia

Department overview
- Jurisdiction: Victorian Government
- Headquarters: 1 Treasury Place, Melbourne
- Ministers responsible: Ben Carroll, Premier; Gabrielle Williams, Deputy Premier, Minister for First Peoples; Paul Edbrooke, Minister for Multicultural Affairs; Ingrid Stitt, Special Minister of State
- Department executive: Chris Barrett, Secretary
- Website: www.dpc.vic.gov.au

The Department of Premier and Cabinet (DPC) is a government department in Victoria, Australia. The department is located at 1 Treasury Place, Melbourne, Victoria, with branch offices in Ballarat and Bendigo.

Similar to other executive offices such as the federal Department of the Prime Minister and Cabinet or the British Cabinet Office, the DPC provides support to the Premier and the public service, and is responsible for a number of miscellaneous matters not handled by other departments.

== Ministers ==
As of August 2026, the DPC supports four ministers in the following portfolios:

Name	Party	Portfolio
Ben Carroll	Labor	Premier
Gabrielle Williams	Labor	Deputy Premier; Minister for First Peoples
Paul Edbrooke	Labor	Minister for Multicultural Affairs
Ingrid Stitt	Labor	Special Minister of State

== Functions ==
The DPC has responsibility over the following policy areas:

- Government administration
- Public service
- Aboriginal affairs
- Equalities
- Government communication
- Liaison with Governor
- Veterans' affairs
- Youth affairs
- Electoral affairs
- Government integrity and anti-corruption
- Multicultural affairs

== Agencies ==
Agencies under the DPC's portfolios include:

- Electoral Boundaries Commission
- Family Violence Reform Implementation Monitor
- Independent Broad-based Anti-corruption Commission
- Infrastructure Victoria
- Local Government Inspectorate
- Office of the Chief Parliamentary Counsel
- Office of the Governor
- Public Interest Monitor
- Office of the Victorian Government Architect
- Office of the Victorian Information Commissioner
- Public Record Office Victoria
- Shrine of Remembrance
- Victorian Aboriginal Heritage Council
- Victorian Electoral Commission
- Victorian Inspectorate
- Victorian Interpreting and Translating Service
- Victorian Multicultural Commission
- Victorian Ombudsman
- Victorian Public Sector Commission
- Victorian Treaty Advancement Commission
- Victorian Veterans' Council

== See also ==
- List of Victorian government agencies
- Premiers of the Australian states
