= Electoral results for the district of Sydenham =

Victoria, Australia, district election results

This is a list of electoral results for the Electoral district of Sydenham in Victorian state elections.

== Members for Sydenham ==
Member	Party	Term
Natalie Hutchins	Labor	2014–present

== Election results ==
=== Elections in the 2020s ===
2022 Victorian state election: Sydenham
Party	Candidate	Votes	%	±%
Labor	Natalie Hutchins	18,978	43.5	−17.8
Liberal	Joseph Cullia	12,661	29.0	+0.9
Family First	Marvet Tawadros	2,818	6.5	+6.5
Greens	Maggie Ralph	2,547	5.8	−0.6
Victorian Socialists	Hajar Chlihi	1,977	4.5	+4.5
Democratic Labour	Jakueline Radovani	1,916	4.4	+4.4
Freedom	Alejandro Ramos	1,672	3.8	+3.8
Animal Justice	Karina Leung	1,095	2.5	+2.5
Total formal votes		43,664	92.4	–0.4
Informal votes		3,591	7.6	+0.4
Turnout		47,255	89.0	
Two-party-preferred result
Labor	Natalie Hutchins	25,744	58.7	−9.0
Liberal	Joseph Cullia	18,093	41.3	+9.0
Labor hold		Swing	−9.0	

=== Elections in the 2010s ===
2018 Victorian state election: Sydenham
Party	Candidate	Votes	%	±%
Labor	Natalie Hutchins	26,264	60.94	+3.57
Liberal	Maria Kerr	12,303	28.54	+0.53
Greens	Clinton Hare	2,754	6.39	−0.71
Independent	Ramanjit Singh	1,780	4.13	+4.13
Total formal votes		43,101	92.83	−0.55
Informal votes		3,329	7.17	+0.55
Turnout		46,430	91.32	−2.42
Two-party-preferred result
Labor	Natalie Hutchins	29,018	67.86	+1.60
Liberal	Maria Kerr	13,743	32.14	−1.60
Labor hold		Swing	+1.60	

2014 Victorian state election: Sydenham
Party	Candidate	Votes	%	±%
Labor	Natalie Hutchins	22,752	57.4	+6.9
Liberal	John Varano	11,112	28.0	−1.6
Greens	Alex Schlotzer	2,814	7.1	−0.7
Voice for the West	Shaun McKerral	1,757	4.4	+4.4
Christians	Nadia Christofidis	1,225	3.1	+3.1
Total formal votes		39,660	93.4	+0.4
Informal votes		2,810	6.6	−0.4
Turnout		42,470	93.8	+3.1
Two-party-preferred result
Labor	Natalie Hutchins	26,301	66.3	+4.7
Liberal	John Varano	13,394	33.7	−4.7
Labor hold		Swing	+4.7	
