= Department of Justice and Community Safety =

Government department of Victoria, Australia

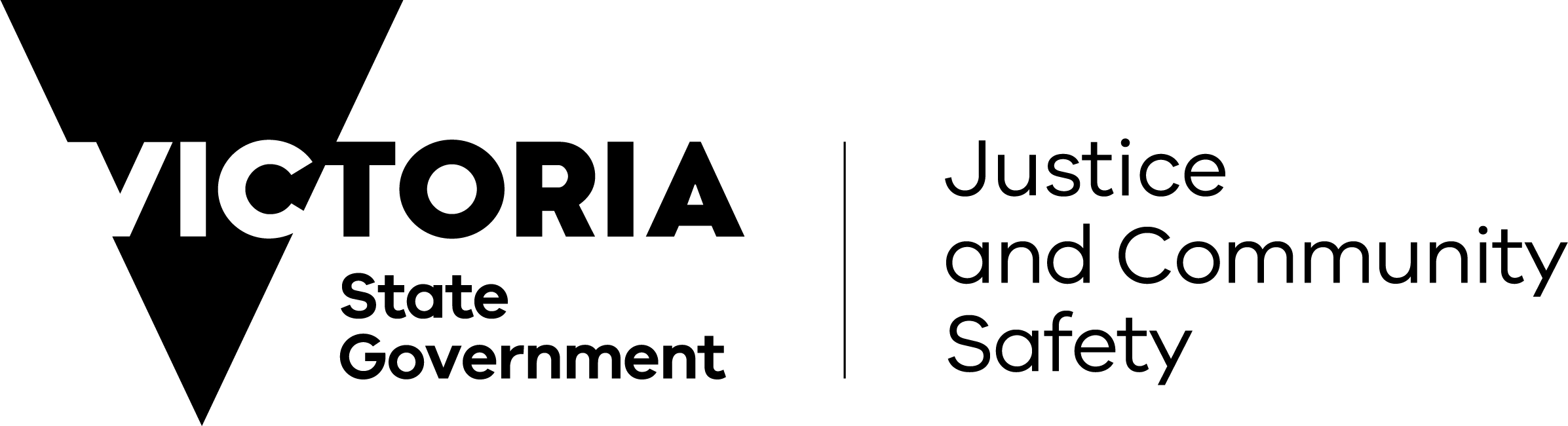

Department overview
- Formed: 1 January 2019
- Preceding Department: Department of Justice and Regulation
- Jurisdiction: Victoria, Australia
- Headquarters: Southern Cross Tower; 121 Exhibition Street, Melbourne
- Employees: 10,201 (June 2020)
- Annual budget: $8.5 billion (FY 19–20)
- Ministers responsible: Sonya Kilkenny, Attorney-General; Anthony Carbines, Minister for Police, Minister for Community Safety, Minister for Victims and Minister for Racing; Enver Erdogan, Minister for Casino, Gaming and Liquor Regulation; Paul Hamer, Minister for Corrections and Minister for Youth Justice; Vicki Ward, Minister for Emergency Services and Minister for Natural Disaster Recovery
- Department executive: Emma Cassar, Secretary
- Website: justice.vic.gov.au
- Agency ID: PROV VA 5038

The Department of Justice and Community Safety (DJCS) is one of ten government departments in the state of Victoria, Australia.

Known as the Department of Justice and Regulation until January 2019, it manages and provides government services relating to Victoria's justice system.

== Ministers ==
As of July 2026, the DJCS supports five ministers in the following portfolios:

Name	Party	Portfolio
Sonia Kilkenny	Labor	Attorney-General
Anthony Carbines	Labor	Minister for Police; Minister for Community Safety; Minister for Victims; Minister for Racing
Enver Erdogan	Labor	Minister for Casino, Gaming and Liquor Regulation
Paul Hamer	Labor	Minister for Corrections; Minister for Youth Justice
Vicki Ward	Labor	Minister for Emergency Services; Minister for Natural Disaster Recovery

== Functions ==
The DJCS has responsibility for the following policy areas:

- Legal system
- Courts and tribunals
- Policing
- Business licensing
- Corrections, prisons and parole
- Human rights and anti-discrimination law
- Emergency services
- Births, deaths and marriages
- Emergency management
- Consumer affairs
- Workplace safety
- Gambling and alcohol regulation

== Agencies ==
Agencies under the DJCS portfolios include:

- Office of Public Prosecutions
- Court Services Victoria
- Legal Services Board
- Sentencing Advisory Council
- Victims of Crime Commissioner
- Victorian Equal Opportunity & Human Rights Commission
- Victorian Law Foundation
- Victorian Law Reform Commission
- Victoria Legal Aid
- Victorian Legal Admissions Board
- Youth Parole Board
- Adult Parole Board
- Corrections Victoria
- Emergency Management Victoria
- State Emergency Service
- Victoria Police
- Fire Rescue Victoria
- Country Fire Authority
- Victorian Legal Services Board and Commissioner
- Victorian Commission for Gambling and Liquor Regulation
- Victorian Registry of Births, Deaths and Marriages
- Consumer Affairs Victoria
