= Minister for Planning and Environment =

Minister for Planning and Environment may refer to:

- Minister for Planning (Victoria)
- Minister for the Environment (Victoria)
