= Minister for Corrections =

Minister for Corrections may refer to:

- Minister for Corrections (Victoria), a ministry position in the Victoria State Government.
- Minister for Corrections (New South Wales), a ministry position in the Government of New South Wales.
