= Minister for Multicultural Affairs =

Minister for Multicultural Affairs may refer to:

- Minister for Multicultural Affairs (Australia), a federal cabinet position
- Minister for Multicultural Affairs (Victoria), a Victorian cabinet position
- Minister for Multiculturalism, a New South Wales cabinet position
