= Minister for Racing =

Minister for Racing may refer to:

- Minister for Racing (New Zealand), a ministry position in the New Zealand Government
- Minister for Racing (Victoria), a ministry position in the Victoria (Australia) State Government
