= Minister for Planning and Local Government =

Minister for Planning and Local Government may refer to:

- Minister for Planning (Victoria), formerly known as the Minister for Planning and Local Government
- Parliamentary Under-Secretary of State for Housing, United Kingdom, formerly known as the Minister for Planning and Local Government)
