= Natalie Hutchins =

Australian politician

The Honourable Natalie Hutchins MP
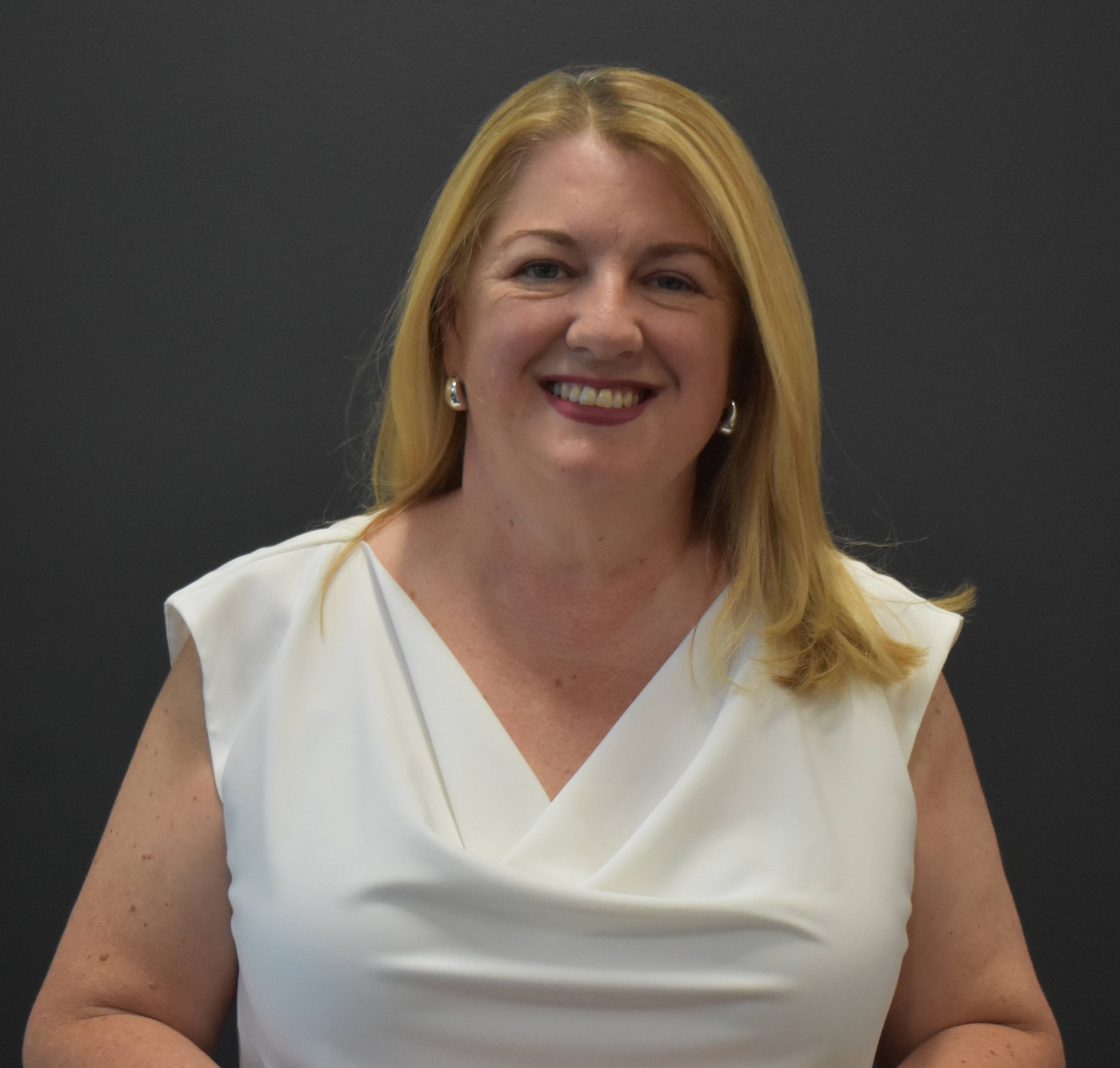
- Hutchins in 2026

Minister for Government Services
- In office 19 December 2024 – 18 December 2025
- Premier: Jacinta Allan
- Preceded by: Danny Pearson
- Succeeded by: Danny Pearson

Minister for Prevention of Family Violence
- In office 19 December 2024 – 18 December 2025
- Premier: Jacinta Allan
- Preceded by: Vicki Ward
- Succeeded by: Ingrid Stitt
- In office 13 September 2017 – 29 November 2018
- Premier: Daniel Andrews
- Preceded by: Fiona Richardson
- Succeeded by: Gabrielle Williams

Minister for Women
- In office 27 June 2022 – 18 December 2025
- Premier: Daniel Andrews; Jacinta Allan
- Preceded by: Gabrielle Williams
- Succeeded by: Mary-Anne Thomas
- In office 13 September 2017 – 29 November 2018
- Premier: Daniel Andrews
- Preceded by: Fiona Richardson
- Succeeded by: Gabrielle Williams

Minister for Treaty and First Peoples (2014–2018: Minister for Aboriginal Affairs)
- In office 2 October 2023 – 18 December 2025
- Premier: Jacinta Allan
- Preceded by: Gabrielle Williams
- Succeeded by: Ros Spence
- In office 4 December 2014 – 29 November 2018
- Premier: Daniel Andrews
- Preceded by: Tim Bull
- Succeeded by: Gavin Jennings

Minister for Jobs and Industry
- In office 2 October 2023 – 19 December 2024
- Premier: Jacinta Allan
- Preceded by: Ben Carroll (as Minister for Industry and Innovation)
- Succeeded by: Danny Pearson (as Minister for Economic Growth and Jobs); Colin Brooks (as Minister for Industry and Advanced Manufacturing)

Minister for Education
- In office 27 June 2022 – 2 October 2023
- Premier: Daniel Andrews
- Preceded by: James Merlino
- Succeeded by: Ben Carroll

Minister for Corrections Minister for Youth Justice Minister for Victim Support
- In office 22 June 2020 – 27 June 2022
- Premier: Daniel Andrews
- Preceded by: Ben Carroll
- Succeeded by: Sonya Kilkenny

Minister for Crime Prevention
- In office 22 June 2020 – 27 June 2022
- Premier: Daniel Andrews
- Preceded by: Ben Carroll
- Succeeded by: Anthony Carbines

Minister for Industrial Relations
- In office 4 December 2014 – 29 November 2018
- Premier: Daniel Andrews
- Preceded by: Robert Clark
- Succeeded by: Tim Pallas

Minister for Local Government
- In office 4 December 2014 – 13 September 2017
- Premier: Daniel Andrews
- Preceded by: Tim Bull
- Succeeded by: Marlene Kairouz

Member of the Victorian Legislative Assembly for Sydenham
- Incumbent
- Assumed office 29 November 2014
- Preceded by: New seat

Member of the Victorian Legislative Assembly for Keilor
- In office 27 November 2010 – 29 November 2014
- Preceded by: George Seitz
- Succeeded by: Seat abolished

Personal details
- Born: 9 March 1972 (age 54) Melbourne
- Party: Labor Party
- Spouse: Steve Hutchins
- Website: www.nataliehutchins.com.au

Natalie Maree Hutchins (née Sykes, born 9 March 1972), also known as Natalie Sykes-Hutchins, is an Australian politician. She has been a Labor Party member of the Victorian Legislative Assembly since 2010, representing the electorates of Keilor (2010–2014) and Sydenham (2014–present).

Hutchins was the Minister for Local Government, Minister for Aboriginal Affairs and Minister for Industrial Relations in the First Andrews Ministry from December 2014 to December 2018. In June 2020, she rejoined the cabinet as Minister for Victim Support and Minister for Corrections, Youth Justice and Crime Prevention. In June 2022, she was appointed as Minister for Education and Minister for Women.

A former union organiser, Hutchins was first woman to be elected Assistant Secretary of the Victorian Trades Hall Council (VTHC). She was a senior advisor to the former Premier of Victoria, Steve Bracks, Chief of Staff to the former Victorian Minister of Education, Mary Delahunty, and was a founding partner in the research and strategy company Global Workplace Solutions. Hutchins, a member of Labor's Unity faction, is a member of the Australian Labor Party National Executive.

The widow of Steve Hutchins, a former Senator for New South Wales, she has one child and five step-children.

== Early life and background ==
Educated at public schools in the north-western suburbs of Melbourne including St Albans North Primary School and Buckley Park High School. She completed a Bachelor of Arts at La Trobe University, where she was the president of the La Trobe University Labor Club and the Victorian President of the National Union of Students. While in high school and studying for her degree she worked variously as a waitress, a dance teacher and a printer's assistant.

Her great-great-grandfather, Hughie Sykes, was one of the first members of the Waterside Workers' Federation of Australia.

== Career ==
Following her graduation, Hutchins became an organiser and industrial officer at the National Union of Workers. In 1996 she was the first woman to be elected as the assistant secretary of the Victorian Trades Hall Council, in the organisation's 137-year history. During her time at the VTHC, Hutchins was one of the police negotiators for the union movement during the 1998 waterfront dispute, coordinated the WorkCover campaign and was instrumental in obtaining legislative changes to stop trainee and apprentice bullying in the workplace. In 1999, shortly after the 1999 election of the Bracks Labor Government, Hutchins resigned her position at the VTHC citing "leadership tensions".

In 2001, Hutchins was employed as a senior organiser with the Transport Workers Union of Australia (TWU) where she negotiated national wages agreements in the airlines, car carrying and road transport industries. A key event during her time with the TWU was the collapse and closure of airline Ansett Australia.

Hutchins started a business partnership in 2007, called Globe Workplace, which focused on workplace research and strategy across Australia. Globe Workplace staff have completed major research projects for both state and federal governments into workforce skills shortages in the transport, logistics manufacturing industries.

Hutchins is a member of the Australian Workers Union component of the Victorian Labor Right.

=== Political career ===
Hutchins was a senior advisor to the former Premier of Victoria, Steve Bracks and Chief of Staff and to the former Minister of Education, Mary Delahunty. Long considered by Labor as a future Member of Parliament, Hutchins' name was proposed in June 2000 for preselection for the Victorian Federal Seat of Isaacs following the death of the sitting member Greg Wilton. In 2006, her name was briefly mentioned as a preselection candidate for the NSW state seat of Blue Mountains following the move of Bob Debus to the Federal Parliament.

In 2009, following the retirement of George Seitz, who had held the seat for Labor since 1982, Hutchins was endorsed by Labor's National Executive as the candidate for Keilor in the 2010 Victorian state election. Hutchins was subsequently elected and was appointed as Shadow Parliamentary Secretary for Public Transport in a February 2012 reshuffle. On 19 February 2013, she was promoted to the Shadow Cabinet as Shadow Minister for Industrial Relations, Ports, Freight & Logistics.

After Labor's win in the 2014 state election, Hutchins was appointed as Minister for Local Government, Industrial Relations and Aboriginal Affairs. After Fiona Richardson died in August 2017, Hutchins took over Richardson's roles as Minister for Women and the Prevention of Family Violence in September 2017, but relinquished the local government portfolio.

After the 2018 state election, Hutchins asked not to be reappointed to the ministry, so that she could spend more time with her children following the recent death of her husband and former Senator Steve Hutchins. Hutchins returned to the ministry in June 2020 when she was appointed as Minister for Corrections, Youth Justice, Crime Prevention and Victim Support.

In June 2022, Hutchins was appointed as Minister for Education and for the second time, as Minister for Women.

On 16 October 2025, Hutchins announced that she would not recontest her seat at the 2026 Victorian state election.

Victorian Legislative Assembly
| Preceded by George Seitz | Member for Keilor; 2010–2014 | Abolished |
| New seat | Member for Sydenham; 2014–present | Incumbent |
Political offices
| Preceded by Tim Bull | Minister for Local Government; 2014–2017 | Succeeded by Marlene Kairouz |
| Preceded by Tim Bull | Minister for Aboriginal Affairs; 2014–2018 | Succeeded by Gavin Jennings |
| Preceded by Robert Clark | Minister for Industrial Relations; 2014–2018 | Succeeded by Tim Pallas |
| Preceded by Fiona Richardson | Minister for Prevention of Family Violence; 2017–2018 | Succeeded by Gabrielle Williams |
| Preceded by Fiona Richardson | Minister for Women; 2017–2018 | Succeeded by Gabrielle Williams |
| Preceded by Ben Carroll | Minister for Corrections; Minister for Youth Justice; Minister for Victim Support; 2020–2022 | Succeeded by Sonya Kilkenny |
| Preceded by Ben Carroll | Minister for Crime Prevention; 2020–2022 | Succeeded by Anthony Carbines |
| Preceded by James Merlino | Minister for Education; 2022–present | Incumbent |
| Preceded by Gabrielle Williams | Minister for Women; 2022–present | Incumbent |
