= Robin Scott (Victorian politician) =

Australian politician

The Honourable Robin Scott MP
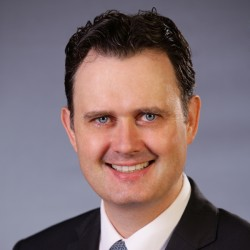

Assistant Treasurer
- In office 29 November 2018 – 15 June 2020
- Premier: Daniel Andrews
- Preceded by: Gordon Rich-Phillips (2010-2014)
- Succeeded by: Danny Pearson

Minister for Finance
- In office 4 December 2014 – 29 November 2018
- Premier: Daniel Andrews
- Preceded by: Robert Clark
- Succeeded by: Office abolished

Minister for Multicultural Affairs
- In office 4 December 2014 – 29 November 2018
- Premier: Daniel Andrews
- Preceded by: Matthew Guy
- Succeeded by: Richard Wynne

Member of the Victorian Legislative Assembly for Preston
- In office 25 November 2006 – 26 November 2022
- Preceded by: Michael Leighton
- Succeeded by: Nathan Lambert
- Majority: 20.70%

Personal details
- Born: 23 January 1973 (age 53) Melbourne, Victoria, Australia
- Party: Labor
- Spouse: Shaojie Scott
- Education: La Trobe University (BA)

Robin David Scott (born 23 January 1973) is a former Australian politician. He was a Labor Party member of the Victorian Legislative Assembly between 2006 and 2022, representing the seat of Preston.

== Early life ==
Scott was born in Melbourne, Victoria, and received a Bachelor of Arts majoring in politics from La Trobe University.

Scott was later hired in 1996 as an electorate officer, with Scott becoming secretary of the party's Preston branch.

== Political career ==
In 2006, Robin Scott was selected as the Labor candidate for Preston, a safe seat being vacated by sitting member Michael Leighton. Scott has represented the seat since. Scott served as Victorian Labor's Shadow Minister for Finance and WorkCover after their loss at the 2010 state election. On 4 December 2014 he was sworn in as Minister for Finance and Minister for Multicultural Affairs in the first Andrews Ministry. Following the 2018 state election, Scott became Assistant Treasurer and Minister for Veterans in the second Andrews Ministry. He resigned from his ministerial positions on 15 June 2020 following a hearing before the Independent Broad-based Anti-corruption Commission (IBAC) into political expenses and branch stacking.

In May 2022, Scott lost preselection for the 2022 state election and retired at the election.

Victorian Legislative Assembly
| Preceded by Michael Leighton | Member for Preston; 2006–2022 | Succeeded by Nathan Lambert |
Political offices
| Preceded by Robert Clark | Minister for Finance; 2014–2018 | Position abolished |
| Preceded by Matthew Guy | Minister for Multicultural Affairs; 2014–2018 | Succeeded by Richard Wynne |
| Preceded by John Eren | Minister for Veterans; 2018–2020 | Succeeded by Shaun Leane |
