= Gabrielle Williams =

Australian politician

The Honourable Gabrielle Williams MP
- Williams in 2026

31st Deputy Premier of Victoria
- Incumbent
- Assumed office 28 July 2026
- Premier: Ben Carroll
- Preceded by: Ben Carroll

Deputy Leader of the Victorian Labor Party
- Incumbent
- Assumed office 28 July 2026
- Leader: Ben Carroll
- Preceded by: Ben Carroll

Minister for Education
- Incumbent
- Assumed office 4 August 2026
- Premier: Ben Carroll
- Preceded by: Ben Carroll

Minister for Women and Gender Equality (Note: Minister for Women and Girls before 4 August 2026)
- Incumbent
- Assumed office 15 April 2026
- Premier: Jacinta Allan; Ben Carroll
- Preceded by: Mary-Anne Thomas (as Minister for Women)

Minister for Skills and Training
- Incumbent
- Assumed office 4 August 2026
- Premier: Ben Carroll
- Preceded by: Colin Brooks (as Minister for Skills and TAFE)

Minister for First Peoples (Note: Minister for Treaty and First Peoples until 4 August 2026; Minister for Aboriginal Affairs before 27 June 2022)
- Incumbent
- Assumed office 4 August 2026
- Premier: Ben Carroll
- Preceded by: Ros Spence
- In office 23 March 2020 – 2 October 2023
- Premier: Daniel Andrews
- Preceded by: Gavin Jennings (as Minister for Aboriginal Affairs)
- Succeeded by: Natalie Hutchins
Past ministerial offices
Minister for Transport and Infrastructure
In office 19 December 2024 – 4 August 2026
Premier	Jacinta Allan; Ben Carroll
Preceded by	Danny Pearson
Succeeded by	Paul Hamer (as Minister for Roads and Road Safery)
Minister for Public and Active Transport
In office 2 October 2023 – 4 August 2026
Premier	Jacinta Allan; Ben Carroll
Preceded by	Ben Carroll (as Minister for Public Transport)
Succeeded by	Vicki Ward (as Minister for Public Transport)
Minister for Government Services
In office 2 October 2023 – 19 December 2024
Premier	Jacinta Allan
Preceded by	Danny Pearson
Succeeded by	Natalie Hutchins
Minister for Consumer Affairs
In office 2 October 2023 – 19 December 2024
Premier	Jacinta Allan
Preceded by	Danny Pearson
Succeeded by	Nick Staikos
Minister for Ambulance Services
In office 5 December 2022 – 2 October 2023
Premier	Daniel Andrews; Jacinta Allan
Preceded by	Mary-Anne Thomas
Succeeded by	Mary-Anne Thomas
Minister for Mental Health
In office 27 June 2022 – 2 October 2023
Premier	Daniel Andrews
Preceded by	James Merlino
Succeeded by	Ingrid Stitt
Minister for Women
In office 29 November 2018 – 27 June 2022
Premier	Daniel Andrews
Preceded by	Natalie Hutchins
Succeeded by	Natalie Hutchins
Minister for the Prevention of Family Violence
In office 29 November 2018 – 27 June 2022
Premier	Daniel Andrews
Preceded by	Natalie Hutchins
Succeeded by	Ros Spence
Minister for Youth
In office 29 November 2018 – 23 March 2020
Premier	Daniel Andrews
Preceded by	Jenny Mikakos (as Minister for Youth Affairs)
Succeeded by	Ros Spence

Personal details
- Born: Gabrielle Leigh Williams; 27 October 1982 (age 43) Melbourne, Victoria, Australia
- Party: Labor
- Children: 1
- Education: Monash University
- Profession: Lawyer
- Website: www.gabriellewilliams.com.au

Gabrielle Leigh Williams (born 27 October 1982) is an Australian politician and lawyer who has served as the deputy premier of Victoria since July 2026, holding office as the deputy leader of the Victorian Labor Party. She has been the member of parliament (MP) for the district of Dandenong since 2014.

Williams was born in Melbourne, attending Emmaus College and studying law and arts at Monash University. She joined the Labor Party as a student and later worked as a political adviser to ministers Peter Batchelor and Lily D'Ambrosio, before becoming a solicitor at law firm Baker McKenzie. Williams was elected to the Legislative Assembly for the district of Dandenong in the 2014 state election.

She was appointed to the Andrews ministry in 2018, where she held various cabinet portfolios across infrastructure, government services and human rights. She has served as the Minister for Education, Minister for Women and Gender Equality, Minister for Skills and Training, and Minister for First Peoples since August 2026. Williams became the deputy premier of Victoria and deputy leader of the Victorian Labor Party in July 2026, following the resignation of premier Jacinta Allan.

== Background and early career ==
Gabrielle Leigh Williams was born on 27 October 1982 in Melbourne, Victoria, the youngest of four girls. Her father worked as an electronics technician and for most of her life, her parents ran a small business repairing household electrical goods. She attended Emmaus College and graduated in 2000 before attaining a Bachelor of Laws and a Bachelor of Arts from Monash University, with Honours.

Williams worked as a Ministerial Adviser to Minister for Energy and Community Development, Peter Batchelor and later, Minister for Community Development, Lily D'Ambrosio. She also worked as an Electorate Officer for Federal Member for Bruce, Alan Griffin. After completing her university studies Williams worked as solicitor at Baker McKenzie. While working as a solicitor, Gabrielle became the director of not-for-profit disability health organisation, Disability Sport and Recreation. Most recently before becoming an MP, Gabrielle worked as a Project Manager in the Office of the Vice Chancellor at The University of Melbourne.

== Political career ==
Williams ran for the seat of Dandenong at the 2014 Victorian State Election, successfully retaining the seat after the retirement of long-standing MP John Pandazopoulos. In December 2014, Williams was appointed as Parliamentary Secretary for Carers and Volunteers. In July 2016, she became the Parliamentary Secretary for Industry, Employment and Volunteers. In November 2016, following a further reshuffle, Williams was appointed Parliamentary Secretary for Health and Parliamentary Secretary for Carers and Volunteers.

Upon the return of the Andrews Labor Government at the 2018 Victorian State Election, Williams entered the Ministry as the Minister for Women, Minister for Youth and the Minister for Prevention of Family Violence. Following the retirement of Gavin Jennings in March 2020, Williams was additionally appointed as Minister for Aboriginal Affairs but relinquished her role as Minister for Youth. In June 2022, Williams was appointed as Minister for Mental Health and Minister for Treaty and First Peoples. Ambulance Services was also added to her Ministerial portfolio in December 2022.

With the resignation of Andrews as premier on 26 September 2023 and the subsequent cabinet reshuffle, Williams was appointed the Minister for Public and Active Transport, the Minister for Consumer Affairs, and the Minister for Government Services in the Jacinta Allan Labor government.

Williams is a member of the Australian Republic Movement and has voiced her support for the 'Yes' campaign in the 2023 Australian Indigenous Voice referendum.

Williams became deputy leader of the Victorian Labor Party and Deputy Premier during the 2026 Victorian Labor Party leadership election. Williams was also briefly elected as interim leader of the Victorian Labor Party and interim Premier after Attorney-General Sonya Kilkenny of the left faction was nominated for the leadership. She ultimately relinquished those positions when Kilkenny withdrew allowing then-Deputy Premier Ben Carroll to assume those positions unopposed.

== Personal life ==
Williams has one son and has been open about her IVF journey and life as a solo mother by choice. She is a joint number one ticket holder for the Melbourne Storm, a supporter of the Collingwood AFL and AFLW teams, and number one ticket holder for the Southside Flyers WNBL team.

== Notes ==
Victorian Legislative Assembly
Preceded by John Pandazopoulos	Member for Dandenong; 2014–present	Incumbent
Political offices
Preceded by Jenny Mikakos as Minister for Youth Affairs	Minister for Youth; 2018–2020	Succeeded by Ros Spence
Preceded by Natalie Hutchins	Minister for Prevention of Family Violence; 2018–2022	Succeeded by Ros Spence
Preceded by Natalie Hutchins	Minister for Women; 2018–2022	Succeeded by Natalie Hutchins
Preceded by Jacinta Allan	Premier of Victoria; Interim; 2026	Succeeded by Ben Carroll
Preceded by Gavin Jennings	Minister for Aboriginal Affairs (2020–2022); Minister for Treaty and First Peoples (2022–present); 2020–present	Incumbent
Preceded by James Merlino	Minister for Mental Health; 2022–present	Incumbent
Preceded by Ben Carroll	Deputy Premier of Victoria; 2026–present	Incumbent
Party political offices
Preceded by Jacinta Allan	Leader of the Victorian Labor Party; Interim; 2026	Succeeded by Ben Carroll
Preceded by Ben Carroll	Deputy Leader of the Victorian Labor Party; 2026–present	Incumbent
