= Electoral district of Sydenham =

State electoral district of Victoria, Australia

Sydenham Victoria—Legislative Assembly
- Interactive map of electoral district boundaries from the 2022 state election
- State: Victoria
- Created: 2014
- MP: Natalie Hutchins
- Party: Labor
- Namesake: Sydenham
- Electors: 50,841 (2018)
- Area: 96 km^{2} (37.1 sq mi)
- Demographic: Metropolitan

The electoral district of Sydenham is an electoral district of the Victorian Legislative Assembly in Australia. It was created in the redistribution of electoral boundaries in 2013, and came into effect at the 2014 state election.

It largely covers the area of the abolished district of Keilor, covering outer northwestern suburbs of Melbourne. It includes the suburbs of Sydenham, Taylors Hill, Delahey, Taylors Lakes and Hillside.

The abolished district of Keilor was held by Labor MP Natalie Hutchins, who retained the new seat at the 2014 election.

== Members ==
Member	Party	Term
Natalie Hutchins	Labor	2014–2026

== Election results ==
2022 Victorian state election: Sydenham
Party	Candidate	Votes	%	±%
Labor	Natalie Hutchins	18,978	43.5	−17.8
Liberal	Joseph Cullia	12,661	29.0	+0.9
Family First	Marvet Tawadros	2,818	6.5	+6.5
Greens	Maggie Ralph	2,547	5.8	−0.6
Victorian Socialists	Hajar Chlihi	1,977	4.5	+4.5
Democratic Labour	Jakueline Radovani	1,916	4.4	+4.4
Freedom	Alejandro Ramos	1,672	3.8	+3.8
Animal Justice	Karina Leung	1,095	2.5	+2.5
Total formal votes		43,662	92.4	–0.5
Informal votes		3,594	7.6	+0.5
Turnout		47,256	89.0	+1.9
Two-party-preferred result
Labor	Natalie Hutchins	25,657	58.8	−8.9
Liberal	Joseph Cullia	18,005	41.2	+8.9
Labor hold		Swing	−8.9	
