= John Pandazopoulos =

Australian politician

Member of the Victorian Legislative Assembly for Dandenong
- In office 3 October 1992 – 29 November 2014
- Preceded by: Terry Norris
- Succeeded by: Gabrielle Williams

Personal details
- Born: 21 July 1963 (age 62)
- Party: Labor Party

John Pandazopoulos (born 21 July 1963) is a Victorian politician. He was a Member of the Victorian Legislative Assembly, representing the electorate of Dandenong for the Labor Party. During the Bracks Government, he was a member of Cabinet, serving as Minister for Major Projects, Employment, Tourism, Gaming and Racing. He was also Minister assisting the Premier on Multicultural Affairs.

== Early life ==
Pandazopoulos was born in Melbourne in 1963. He grew up in the outer suburb of Doveton, where he attended Doveton High School. He gained admission to Monash University in 1982, where he obtained a Bachelor of Arts. While at university, he was active in student politics, serving as Secretary of the Monash Student Association as well as having an active role in NUGAS. One of his contemporaries in student politics was John Lenders, who was Treasurer of Victoria.

Upon graduating, Pandazopoulos began work as an organiser with the Finance Sector Union. He was elected to the City of Berwick Council in 1987, and was Mayor from 1990–1991.

== Political career ==
At age 29, Pandazopoulos was elected to the Victorian Parliament as Member for Dandenong. While the Labor Party was in Opposition from 1992–1999, he was appointed to a number of key roles, such as Shadow Minister for Freedom of Information and Tourism. When the Bracks Government was elected in 1999, Pandazopoulos became a member of the Victorian Cabinet as Minister for Major Projects, as well as Minister for Gaming and Minister assisting the Premier on Multicultural Affairs. He was dropped from Cabinet after the 2006 Victorian election, and has since served as Chair of the Environment and Natural Resources Committee.

On 26 November 2013, Pandazopoulos announced he would not contest the 2014 state election, and would be retiring from politics.

Victorian Legislative Assembly
Preceded by Terry Norris	Member for Dandenong; 1992–2014	Succeeded by Gabrielle Williams
