= Ingrid Stitt =

Australian politician

The Honourable Ingrid Stitt MLC
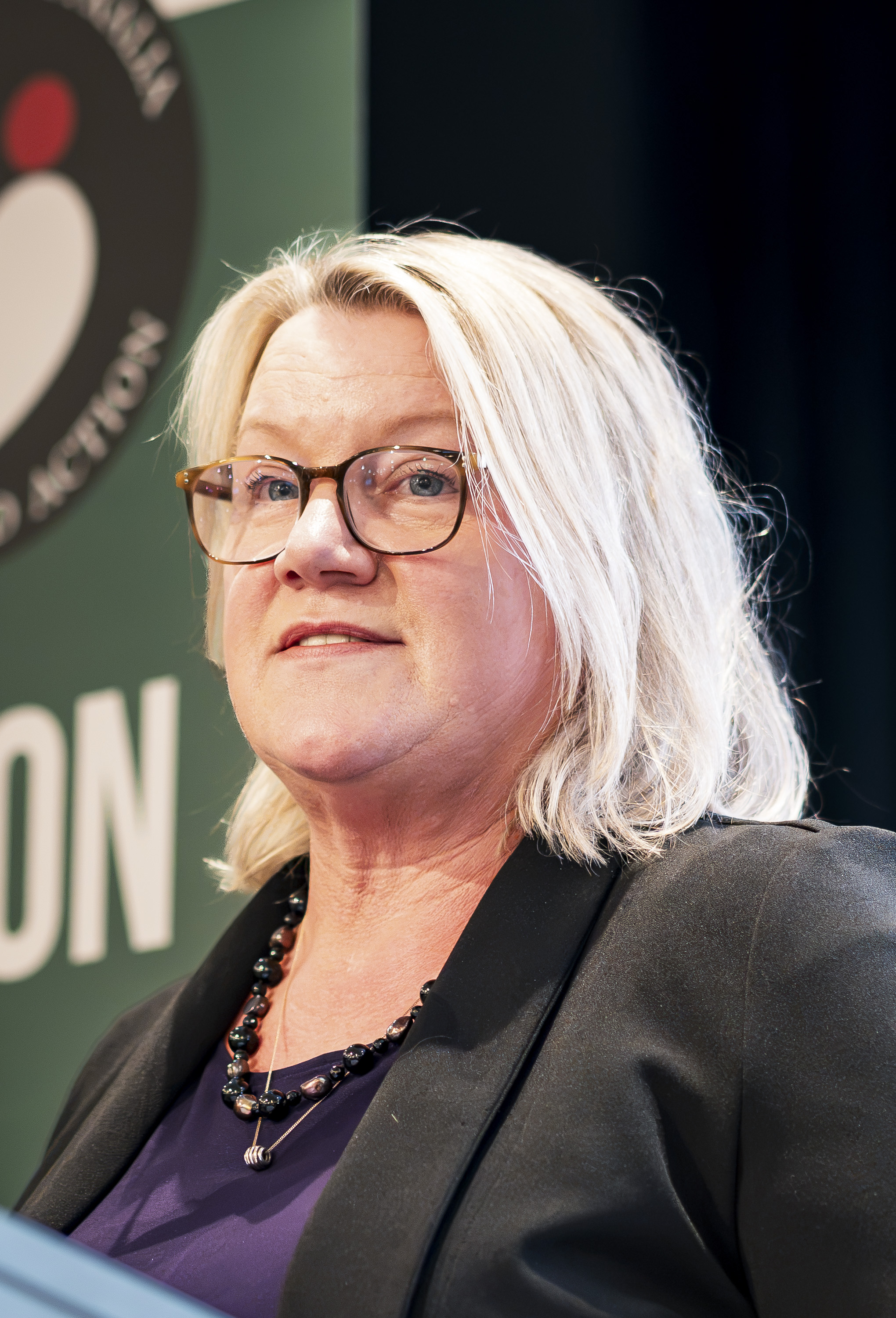

Minister for Health
- Incumbent
- Assumed office 4 August 2026
- Premier: Ben Carroll
- Preceded by: Harriet Shing

Minister for Mental Health
- Incumbent
- Assumed office 2 October 2023
- Premier: Jacinta Allan; Ben Carroll
- Preceded by: Gabrielle Williams

Minister for Ambulance Services
- Incumbent
- Assumed office 4 August 2026
- Premier: Ben Carroll
- Preceded by: Harriet Shing

Special Minister of State
- Incumbent
- Assumed office 15 April 2026
- Premier: Jacinta Allan; Ben Carroll
- Preceded by: Position established
Other ministerial offices
Minister for Government Services
In office 15 April 2026 – 4 August 2026
Premier	Jacinta Allan
Preceded by	Danny Pearson
Succeeded by	Enver Erdogan
Minister for Multicultural and Multifaith Victoria
In office 15 April 2026 – 4 August 2026
Premier	Jacinta Allan
Preceded by	Herself (as Minister for Multicultural Affairs)
Succeeded by	Paul Edbrooke (as Minister for Multicultural Affairs)
Minister for Ageing
In office 2 October 2023 – 4 August 2026
Premier	Jacinta Allan
Preceded by	Lizzie Blandthorn (as Minister for Disability, Ageing and Carers)
Succeeded by	Nick Staikos (as Minister for Seniors)
Minister for Prevention of Family Violence
In office 18 December 2025 – 15 April 2026
Premier	Jacinta Allan
Preceded by	Vicki Ward
Succeeded by	Melissa Horne
Minister for Multicultural Affairs
In office 2 October 2023 – 15 April 2026
Premier	Jacinta Allan
Preceded by	Colin Brooks
Succeeded by	Herself (as Minister for Multicultural and Multifaith Victoria)
Minister for the Environment
In office 5 December 2022 – 2 October 2023
Premier	Daniel AndrewsJacinta Allan
Preceded by	Lily D'Ambrosio (as Minister for Environment and Climate Action)
Succeeded by	Steve Dimopoulos
Minister for Early Childhood and Pre-Prep
In office 27 June 2022 – 2 October 2023
Premier	Daniel AndrewsJacinta Allan
Preceded by	Herself (as Minister for Early Childhood)
Succeeded by	Position abolished
Minister for Workplace Safety
In office 29 September 2020 – 5 December 2022
Premier	Daniel Andrews
Preceded by	Jill Hennessy
Succeeded by	Danny Pearson (as Minister for WorkSafe and the TAC)
Minister for Early Childhood
In office 29 September 2020 – 27 June 2022
Premier	Daniel Andrews
Preceded by	Position established
Succeeded by	Herself (as Minister for Early Childhood and Pre-Prep)

Member of the Legislative Council for Western Metropolitan Region
- Incumbent
- Assumed office 24 November 2018

Personal details
- Born: United Kingdom
- Party: Australian Labor Party

Ingrid Stitt (born 1965/1966) is an Australian politician and former trade union official who has served as the Victorian Minister for Health and Minister for Ambulance Services since August 2026. She has served as Minister for Mental Health since October 2023 and Special Minister of State since April 2026. Stitt has been an Labor Party member of the Victorian Legislative Council since 2018, representing the Western Metropolitan Region.

== Early and political career ==
Before entering parliament, Stitt served as secretary of the Victorian branch of the Australian Services Union from 2004 to 2018. She entered the ministry in September 2020 as Minister for Workplace Safety and Minister for Early Childhood.

Stitt is a member of the Labor Left faction of the Labor Party.

== Personal life ==
Stitt was born in the United Kingdom to artists Peter and Daphne Stitt. In 1974, when Ingrid was 8, the Stitts moved to Australia when Peter took up a lecturing job at the Prahran College of the Arts in Melbourne.
