= Minister for Energy and Resources =

Australian state ministry portfolio in Victoria

Minister for Energy of Resources of Victoria of Victoria
- Victorian coat of arms

- Flag of Victoria
- Incumbent; Lily D'Ambrosio MP since 4 December 2014
- Department of Energy, Environment and Climate Action
- Style: The Honourable
- Member of: Parliament; Executive council
- Reports to: Premier
- Nominator: Premier
- Appointer: Governor on the recommendation of the premier
- Term length: At the governor's pleasure
- Inaugural holder: Jim Balfour MP
- Formation: 1 September 1977

The Minister for Energy and Resources is a ministry portfolio within the Executive Council of Victoria.

== Ministers ==
| Order | MP | Party affiliation | Ministerial title | Term start | Term end | Time in office | Notes |
|---|---|---|---|---|---|---|---|
| 1 | Jim Balfour MP | Liberal | Minister for Minerals and Energy | 1 September 1977 | 3 February 1981 | 3 years, 155 days | |
| 2 | Lou Lieberman MP | Liberal | Minister for Minerals and Energy | 3 February 1981 | 5 June 1981 | 122 days | |
| 3 | Digby Crozier MLC | Liberal | Minister for Minerals and Energy | 5 June 1981 | 8 April 1982 | 307 days | |
| 4 | David White MLC | Labor | Minister for Minerals and Energy | 8 April 1982 | 2 May 1985 | 3 years, 24 days | |
| 5 | Robert Fordham MP | Labor | Minister for Industry, Technology and Resources | 2 May 1985 | 13 October 1988 | 3 years, 164 days | |
| 6 | Evan Walker MLC | Labor | Minister for Industry, Technology and Resources | 13 October 1988 | 7 February 1989 | 117 days | |
| (4) | David White MLC | Labor | Minister for Industry, Technology and Resources | 7 February 1989 | 10 August 1990 | 1 year, 184 days | |
| 7 | Jim Plowman MP | Liberal | Minister for Energy and Minerals | 6 October 1992 | 3 April 1996 | 3 years, 180 days | |
| 8 | Candy Broad MLC | Labor | Minister for Energy and Resources | 20 October 1999 | 5 December 2002 | 3 years, 46 days | |
| 9 | Theo Theophanous MLC | Labor | Minister for Energy Industries; Minister for Resources | 5 December 2002 | 1 December 2006 | 3 years, 361 days | |
| 10 | Peter Batchelor MP | Labor | Minister for Energy and Resources | 1 December 2006 | 2 December 2010 | 4 years, 1 day | |
| 11 | Michael O'Brien MP | Liberal | Minister for Energy and Resources | 2 December 2010 | 13 March 2013 | 2 years, 101 days | |
| 12 | Nicholas Kotsiras MP | Liberal | Minister for Energy and Resources | 13 March 2013 | 17 March 2014 | 1 year, 4 days | |
| 13 | Russell Northe MP | Nationals | Minister for Energy and Resources | 17 March 2014 | 4 December 2014 | 262 days | |
| 14 | Lily D'Ambrosio MP | Labor | Minister for Energy and Resources | 4 December 2014 | 23 May 2016 | 1 year, 171 days | |
| 14 | Lily D'Ambrosio MP | Labor | Ministry for Energy, Environment and Climate Change | 23 May 2016 | 27 June 2022 | 6 years, 35 days | |
| 14 | Lily D'Ambrosio MP | Labor | Minister for Energy | 27 June 2022 | 5 December 2022 | 161 days | |
| 14 | Lily D'Ambrosio MP | Labor | Minister for Energy and Resources | 5 December 2022 | Incumbent | 3 years, 276 days | |
