= Minister for Mental Health (Victoria) =

Australian state ministry portfolio

Minister for Mental Health of Victoria
- Victorian coat of arms

- Flag of Victoria
- Incumbent; Ingrid Stitt MLC since 2 October 2023
- Style: The Honourable
- Member of: Parliament; Executive council
- Reports to: Premier
- Nominator: Premier
- Appointer: Governor on the recommendation of the premier
- Term length: At the governor's pleasure
- Inaugural holder: Lisa Neville MP
- Formation: 1 December 2006

The Minister for Mental Health is a ministry portfolio within the Executive Council of Victoria.

== Ministers ==
Order	MP	Party affiliation	Term start	Term end	Time in office	Notes
1	Lisa Neville MP	Labor	1 December 2006	2 December 2010	4 years, 1 day	
2	Mary Wooldridge MP	Liberal	2 December 2010	4 December 2014	4 years, 2 days	
3	Martin Foley MP	Labor	4 December 2014	29 September 2020	5 years, 300 days	
4	James Merlino MP	Labor	29 September 2020	27 June 2022	1 year, 271 days	
5	Gabrielle Williams MP	Labor	27 June 2022	2 October 2023	1 year, 97 days	
6	Ingrid Stitt MLC	Labor	2 October 2023	Incumbent	2 years, 340 days	

== See also ==
- Minister for Mental Health and Ageing (Australia)
  - Minister for Mental Health (New South Wales)
  - Minister for Mental Health (Western Australia)
