= Evan Walker (politician) =

The Honourable Evan Walker AO

Victorian Legislative Council
- In office 5 May 1979 – 2 October 1992

Member of the Victorian Parliament for Member for Melbourne, Victorian Legislative Council

Personal details
- Born: 11 October 1935 Melbourne
- Died: 16 February 2015 (aged 79) Melbourne
- Party: Australian Labor Party
- Spouse: Judith Walker
- Children: 3
- Education: University of Melbourne, Bachelor of Architecture 1959; University of Toronto, Master of Architecture, 1962
- Profession: Architect, Politician

Evan Herbert Walker AO (11 October 1935 – 16 February 2015) was an Australian architect and politician.

== Early life, education and architecture career ==
Evan Walker was born in Melbourne to Charles Fitzroy Walker, the headmaster of Box Hill Grammar School, and Ethel Ingamells. He attended his father's school and then Melbourne High School, graduating with a Bachelor of Architecture in 1959 from the University of Melbourne. He studied at the University of Toronto on a Commonwealth scholarship, receiving a Master of Architecture in 1962. He practised in Australia from 1963, but returned to Canada from 1965 to 1969, where he also tutored at Toronto University.

In 1965 he established the architectural practice Jackson Walker in East Melbourne. In 1970, 1972, 1974 and 1976 they were awarded Bronze Medals by the Victorian Chapter of the Australian Institute of Architects for three different schools and the City Edge housing development in South Melbourne.

In 1971, he worked on the Elliston Estate in Rosanna.

== Political career ==
In 1969 Walker joined the Labor Party. He was elected to the Victorian Legislative Council for Melbourne in 1979, immediately becoming Deputy Opposition Leader in the upper house. Following Labor's victory in 1982, he became Deputy Leader of the Government in the Legislative Council, as well as Minister for Conservation and Planning. In 1983 he added Public Works, and in 1985, he shifted to Agriculture and Rural Affairs. He was Industry Minister from 1988 to 1989 and Major Projects and Arts Minister from 1989 to 1990.

Walker retired from politics in 1992, remaining active in University of Melbourne's architecture faculty until 2000. Walker died in February 2015, aged 79.

== Recognition ==
In the 1996 Australia Day Honours he was made an Officer of the Order of Australia for "service to architecture, town planning and the Victorian Parliament". He was awarded the Centenary Medal on 1 January 2001 for "service to planning and urban design in Victoria.

The Southbank Pedestrian Bridge was subsequently renamed Evan Walker Bridge, recognising the late Professor Walker’s role in creating the Southbank precinct.

Victorian Legislative Council
Preceded by Doug Elliot	Member for Melbourne; 1979–1992; Served alongside: Ivan Trayling; Barry Pullen	Succeeded by Doug Walpole
