= Assistant Treasurer of Victoria =

Australian state ministry portfolio

- Victorian coat of arms

- Flag of Victoria
- Incumbent; Danny Pearson MP since 22 June 2020
- Department of Treasury and Finance
- Style: The Honourable
- Member of: Parliament; Executive council
- Reports to: Premier
- Nominator: Premier
- Appointer: Governor on the recommendation of the premier
- Term length: At the governor's pleasure
- Inaugural holder: John Brumby MP
- Formation: 20 October 1999

The Assistant Treasurer is a ministry portfolio within the Executive Council of Victoria assisting the Victorian Treasurer.

== Ministers ==
Order	MP	Party affiliation	Ministerial title	Term start	Term end	Time in office	Notes
1	John Brumby MP	Labor	Assistant Treasurer	20 October 1999	22 May 2000	215 days	
2	Gordon Rich-Phillips MLC	Liberal	Assistant Treasurer	2 December 2010	4 December 2014	4 years, 2 days	
3	Robin Scott MP	Labor	Assistant Treasurer	29 November 2018	15 June 2020	1 year, 199 days	
4	Danny Pearson MP	Labor	Assistant Treasurer	22 June 2020	Incumbent	6 years, 76 days	
