= Minister for Education (Victoria) =

Australian state ministry portfolio

Minister for Education of Victoria
- Victorian coat of arms

- Flag of Victoria

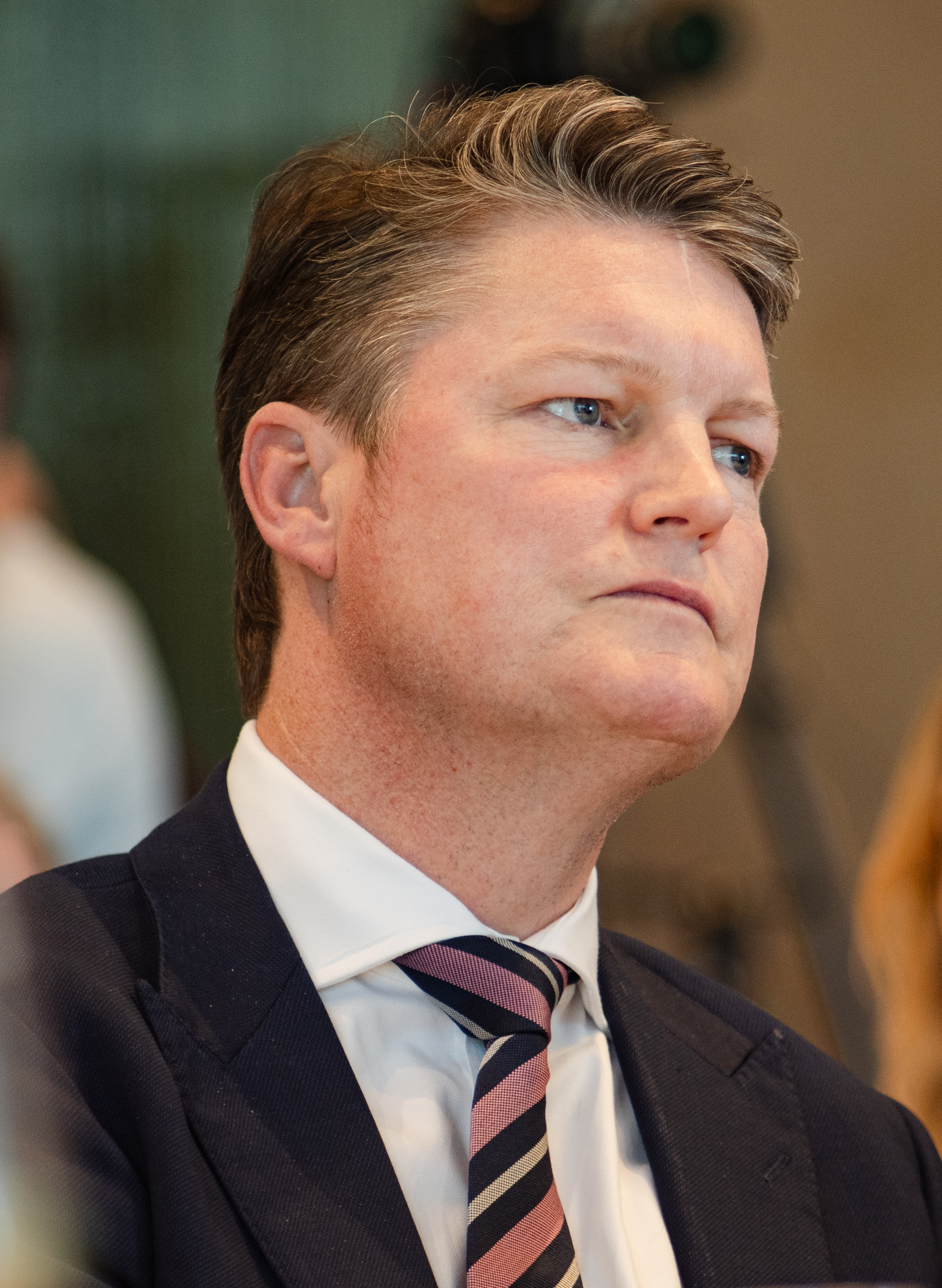
- Incumbent; Ben Carroll MP since 2 October 2023
- Department of Education
- Style: The Honourable
- Member of: Parliament; Cabinet; Executive council
- Reports to: Premier
- Nominator: Premier
- Appointer: Governor on the recommendation of the premier
- Term length: At the governor's pleasure
- Precursor: Minister of Public Instruction; Minister of Education; Minister for Education and Training; Minister for School Education
- Inaugural holder: James Stephen MP
- Formation: 2 January 1873

The Minister for Education is a minister within the Executive Council of Victoria, Australia.

== Ministers for Education ==
Order	MP	Party affiliation	Ministerial title	Term start	Term end	Time in office	Notes
1	James Stephen MP	Independent	Minister of Public Instruction	2 January 1873	1 May 1874	1 year, 119 days	
2	James Munro MP	Non-Party Liberalism	Minister of Public Instruction	7 August 1875	20 October 1875	74 days	
3	Robert Ramsay MP	Non-Party Conservatism	Minister of Public Instruction	20 October 1875	21 May 1877	1 year, 213 days	
4	William Smith MP	Non-Party Liberalism	Minister of Public Instruction	21 May 1877	5 March 1880	2 years, 289 days	
(3)	Robert Ramsay MP	Non-Party Conservatism	Minister of Education	5 March 1880	3 August 1880	151 days	
(4)	William Smith MP	Non-Party Liberalism	Minister of Public Instruction	3 August 1880	9 July 1881	340 days	
5	James Grant MP	Non-Party Liberalism	Minister of Public Instruction	9 July 1881	8 March 1883	1 year, 242 days	
6	James Service MP	Non-Party Conservatism	Minister of Public Instruction	8 March 1883	10 April 1884	1 year, 33 days	
7	Duncan Gillies MP	Non-Party Conservatism	Minister of Public Instruction	10 April 1884	18 February 1886	1 year, 314 days	
8	Dr Charles Pearson MP	Non-Party Conservatism	Minister of Public Instruction	18 February 1886	5 November 1890	4 years, 260 days	
9	Sir Frederick Sargood MLC	Non-Party Liberalism	Minister of Public Instruction	5 November 1890	16 February 1892	1 year, 103 days	
10	Alexander Peacock MP	Non-Party Liberalism	Minister of Public Instruction	16 February 1892	23 January 1893	342 days	
11	James Campbell MP	Non-Party Conservatism	Minister of Public Instruction	23 January 1893	16 September 1893	236 days	
12	Richard Baker MP	Non-Party Conservatism	Minister of Public Instruction	16 September 1893	27 September 1894	1 year, 11 days	
(10)	Alexander Peacock MP	Protectionist and Liberal	Minister of Public Instruction	27 September 1894	5 December 1899	5 years, 69 days	
13	James McCay MP	Non-Party Liberalism	Minister of Public Instruction	5 December 1899	29 December 1899	24 days	
14	Dr Charles Salmon MP	Non-Party Liberalism	Minister of Public Instruction	29 December 1899	19 November 1900	355 days	
15	William Gurr MP	Non-Party Liberalism	Minister of Public Instruction	19 November 1900	10 June 1902	1 year, 173 days	
16	Robert Reid MLC	Reform	Minister of Public Instruction	10 June 1902	3 February 1903	238 days	
17	John Davies MLC	Reform	Minister of Public Instruction	6 February 1903	7 September 1903	213 days	
18	Arthur Sachse MLC	Reform	Minister of Public Instruction	7 September 1903	31 October 1908	5 years, 54 days	
19	John Bowser MP	Reform	Minister of Public Instruction	31 October 1908	8 January 1909	69 days	
20	Alfred Billson MP	Commonwealth Liberal	Minister of Public Instruction	8 January 1909	19 February 1913	4 years, 42 days	
(10)	Sir Alexander Peacock MP	Commonwealth Liberal	Minister of Public Instruction	19 February 1913	9 December 1913	293 days	
21	John Lemmon MP	Labor	Minister of Public Instruction	9 December 1913	22 December 1913	13 days	
(10)	Sir Alexander Peacock MP	Commonwealth Liberal	Minister of Public Instruction	22 December 1913	18 June 1914	178 days	
22	Thomas Livingston MP	Commonwealth Liberal	Minister of Public Instruction	18 June 1914	9 November 1915	1 year, 144 days	
23	Harry Lawson MP	Commonwealth Liberal	Minister of Public Instruction	9 November 1915	29 November 1917	2 years, 20 days	
23	Harry Lawson MP	Nationalist	Minister of Public Instruction	9 November 1915	29 November 1917	2 years, 20 days	
24	Matthew Baird MP	Nationalist	Minister of Public Instruction	29 November 1917	21 March 1918	112 days	
25	William Hutchinson MP	Nationalist	Minister of Public Instruction	21 March 1918	1 November 1920	2 years, 225 days	
(10)	Sir Alexander Peacock MP	Nationalist	Minister of Public Instruction	4 November 1920	28 April 1924	3 years, 176 days	
26	Richard Toutcher MP	Nationalist	Minister of Public Instruction	28 April 1924	18 July 1924	51 days	
(21)	John Lemmon MP	Labor	Minister of Education	18 July 1924	18 November 1924	123 days	
(10)	Sir Alexander Peacock MP	Nationalist	Minister of Public Instruction	18 November 1924	20 May 1927	2 years, 183 days	
(21)	John Lemmon MP	Labor	Minister of Public Instruction	20 May 1927	22 November 1928	1 year, 186 days	
27	Henry Cohen MLC	Nationalist	Minister of Public Instruction	22 November 1928	12 December 1929	1 year, 20 days	
(21)	John Lemmon MP	Labor	Minister of Public Instruction	12 December 1929	19 May 1932	2 years, 159 days	
28	John Pennington MP	United Australia Party	Minister of Public Instruction	19 May 1932	20 March 1935	2 years, 305 days	
29	Harold Cohen MLC	United Australia Party	Minister of Public Instruction	20 March 1935	2 April 1935	13 days	
30	Dr John Harris MLC	United Country	Minister of Public Instruction	2 April 1935	1 January 1942	6 years, 274 days	
31	Albert Lind MP	United Country	Minister of Public Instruction	8 January 1942	14 September 1943	1 year, 249 days	
32	Francis Field MP	Labor	Minister of Public Instruction	14 September 1943	18 September 1943	4 days	
33	Thomas Hollway MP	United Australia Party	Minister of Public Instruction	18 September 1943	2 October 1945	2 years, 14 days	
33	Thomas Hollway MP	Liberal	Minister of Public Instruction	18 September 1943	2 October 1945	2 years, 14 days	
34	Leslie Hollins MP	Independent	Minister of Public Instruction	2 October 1945	21 November 1945	50 days	
(32)	Francis Field MP	Labor	Minister of Public Instruction	21 November 1945	20 November 1947	1 year, 364 days	
35	Wilfrid Kent Hughes MP	Liberal	Minister of Public Instruction	20 November 1947	8 December 1948	1 year, 18 days	
36	Ray Tovell MP	Liberal	Minister of Public Instruction	8 December 1948	27 June 1950	1 year, 201 days	
37	Percival Inchbold MLC	Country	Minister of Education	27 June 1950	28 October 1952	2 years, 123 days	
(36)	Ray Tovell MP	Electoral Reform League	Minister of Education	28 October 1952	31 October 1952	3 days	
(37)	Percival Inchbold MLC	Country	Minister of Education	31 October 1952	17 December 1952	47 days	
38	Ernie Shepherd MP	Labor	Minister of Education	17 December 1952	7 June 1955	2 years, 172 days	
39	Arthur Rylah MP	Liberal Country Party	Minister of Education	7 June 1955	8 June 1955	1 day	
40	William Leggatt MP	Liberal Country Party	Minister of Education	8 June 1955	14 February 1956	251 days	
41	John Bloomfield MP	Liberal Country Party	Minister of Education	14 February 1956	9 May 1967	11 years, 84 days	
42	Lindsay Thompson MLC	Liberal Country Party	Minister of Education	9 May 1967	16 May 1979	12 years, 7 days	
43	Alan Hunt MLC	Liberal	Minister of Education	16 May 1979	8 April 1982	2 years, 327 days	
44	Robert Fordham MP	Labor	Minister of Education	8 April 1982	2 May 1985	3 years, 24 days	
45	Ian Cathie MP	Labor	Minister for Education	2 May 1985	14 December 1987	2 years, 226 days	
46	Caroline Hogg MLC	Labor	Minister for Education	14 December 1987	13 October 1988	304 days	
47	Joan Kirner MP	Labor	Minister for Education	13 October 1988	10 August 1990	1 year, 301 days	
48	Barry Pullen MLC	Labor	Minister for Education	10 August 1990	18 January 1991	161 days	
48	Barry Pullen MLC	Labor	Minister for Education and Training	18 January 1991	28 January 1992	1 year, 10 days	
49	Neil Pope MP	Labor	Minister for School Education	28 January 1992	6 October 1992	252 days	
50	Don Hayward MP	Liberal	Minister for Education	6 October 1992	3 April 1996	3 years, 180 days	
51	Phil Gude MP	Liberal	Minister for Education	3 April 1996	20 October 1999	3 years, 200 days	
52	Mary Delahunty MP	Labor	Minister for Education	20 October 1999	5 December 2002	3 years, 46 days	
53	Lynne Kosky MP	Labor	Minister for Education and Training	5 December 2002	1 December 2006	3 years, 361 days	
54	John Lenders MLC	Labor	Minister for Education	1 December 2006	3 August 2007	245 days	
55	Bronwyn Pike MP	Labor	Minister for Education	3 August 2007	2 December 2010	3 years, 121 days	
56	Martin Dixon MP	Liberal	Minister for Education	2 December 2010	4 December 2014	4 years, 2 days	
57	James Merlino MP	Labor	Minister for Education	4 December 2014	27 June 2022	7 years, 205 days	
58	Natalie Hutchins MP	Labor	Minister for Education	27 June 2022	2 October 2023	1 year, 97 days	
59	Ben Carroll MP	Labor	Minister for Education	2 October 2023	Incumbent	2 years, 340 days	

== Ministers for Skills and TAFE ==
Order	MP	Party affiliation	Ministerial title	Term start	Term end	Time in office	Notes
1	Steve Herbert MLC	Labor	Minister for Training and Skills	4 December 2014	9 November 2016	1 year, 341 days	
2	Gayle Tierney MLC	Labor	Minister for Training and Skills	9 November 2016	2 October 2023	9 years, 302 days	
2	Gayle Tierney MLC	Labor	Minister for Skills and TAFE	2 October 2023	Incumbent	9 years, 302 days	

== Ministers for Higher Education ==
Order	MP	Party affiliation	Ministerial title	Term start	Term end	Time in office	Notes
1	Evan Walker MLC	Labor	Minister responsible for Post-Secondary Education	7 February 1989	10 August 1990	1 year, 184 days	
2	Tom Roper MP	Labor	Minister for Post-Secondary Education and Training	28 January 1992	6 October 1992	252 days	
3	Haddon Storey MLC	Liberal	Minister for Tertiary Education and Training	6 October 1992	3 April 1996	3 years, 180 days	
4	Phil Honeywood MP	Liberal	Minister for Tertiary Education and Training	3 April 1996	20 October 1999	3 years, 200 days	
5	Lynne Kosky MP	Labor	Minister for Post Compulsory Education, Training and Employment	20 October 1999	5 December 2002	3 years, 46 days	
6	Peter Hall MLC	Nationals	Minister for Higher Education and Skills	2 December 2010	17 March 2014	3 years, 105 days	
7	Nick Wakeling MP	Liberal	Minister for Higher Education and Skills	17 March 2014	4 December 2014	262 days	
8	Gayle Tierney MLC	Labor	Minister for Higher Education	29 November 2018	2 October 2023	4 years, 307 days	

== Ministers for Education Services ==
Order	MP	Party affiliation	Ministerial title	Term start	Term end	Time in office	Notes
1	Norman Lacy MP	Liberal	Minister of Educational Services	23 December 1980	8 April 1982	1 year, 106 days	
2	Robert Fordham MP	Labor	Minister of Educational Services	8 April 1982	8 February 1984	1 year, 306 days	
3	Monica Gould MLC	Labor	Minister for Education Services	12 February 2002	1 December 2006	4 years, 292 days	
4	Jacinta Allan MP	Labor	Minister for Skills, Education Services and Employment	1 December 2006	3 August 2007	245 days	

== Ministers for Skills and Workforce Participation ==
Order	MP	Party affiliation	Ministerial title	Term start	Term end	Time in office	Notes
1	Jacinta Allan MP	Labor	Minister for Skills and Workforce Participation	3 August 2007	20 January 2010	2 years, 170 days	
2	Bronwyn Pike MP	Labor	Minister for Skills and Workforce Participation	20 January 2010	2 December 2010	316 days	

== Minister for Special Education ==
Order	MP	Party affiliation	Ministerial title	Term start	Term end	Time in office	Notes
1	Alan Scanlan MP	Liberal	Minister for Special Education	31 March 1976	16 May 1979	3 years, 46 days	

== Minister for International Education ==
Order	MP	Party affiliation	Ministerial title	Term start	Term end	Time in office	Notes
1	Steve Herbert MLC	Labor	Minister for International Education	23 May 2016	9 November 2016	170 days	

== Minister responsible for the Teaching Profession ==
Order	MP	Party affiliation	Ministerial title	Term start	Term end	Time in office	Notes
1	Peter Hall MLC	Nationals	Minister responsible for the Teaching Profession	2 December 2010	17 March 2014	3 years, 105 days	

== See also ==
- Minister for Education (Australia)
- Minister for Children (Victoria)
- Minister for Employment (Victoria)
