= Minister for Women and Gender Equality (Victoria) =

Minister for Women of Victoria
- Victorian coat of arms

- Flag of Victoria
- Incumbent; Gabrielle Williams MP since 15 April 2026
- Style: The Honourable
- Member of: Parliament; Executive council
- Reports to: Premier
- Nominator: Premier
- Appointer: Governor on the recommendation of the premier
- Term length: At the governor's pleasure
- Precursor: Minister responsible for Women's Affairs; Minister for Women's Affairs

The Minister for Women and Gender Equality is a minister within the Executive Council of Victoria tasked with the responsibility of overseeing the Victorian Government's laws and initiatives regarding women, and women's rights.

Gabrielle Williams has been the minister since April 2026.

== Ministers ==
Order	Minister	Party affiliation	Ministerial title	Term start	Term end	Time in office	Notes
	John Cain MP	Labor	Minister responsible for Women's Affairs	1986			
	Joan Kirner MP	Labor	Minister responsible for Women's Affairs	1990	1992		
	Jan Wade MP	Liberal	Minister for Women's Affairs	6 October 1992	20 October 1999	7 years, 14 days	
	Sherryl Garbutt MP	Labor	Minister for Women's Affairs	20 October 1999	12 February 2002	2 years, 115 days	
	Mary Delahunty MP	Labor	Minister for Women's Affairs	12 February 2002	1 December 2006	4 years, 292 days	
	Jacinta Allan MP	Labor	Minister for Women's Affairs	1 December 2006	3 August 2007	245 days	
	Maxine Morand MP	Labor	Minister for Women's Affairs	3 August 2007	2 December 2010	3 years, 121 days	
	Mary Wooldridge MP	Liberal	Minister for Women's Affairs	2 December 2010	13 March 2013	2 years, 101 days	
	Heidi Victoria MP	Liberal	Minister for Women's Affairs	13 March 2013	4 December 2014	1 year, 266 days	
	Fiona Richardson MP	Labor	Minister for Women	4 December 2014	23 August 2017	2 years, 262 days	
	Natalie Hutchins MP	Labor	Minister for Women	13 September 2017	29 November 2018	1 year, 77 days	
	Gabrielle Williams MP	Labor	Minister for Women	29 November 2018	27 June 2022	3 years, 210 days	
	Natalie Hutchins MP	Labor	Minister for Women	27 June 2022	Incumbent	4 years, 72 days	
