= Minister for Police (Victoria) =

Government minister in Victoria, Australia

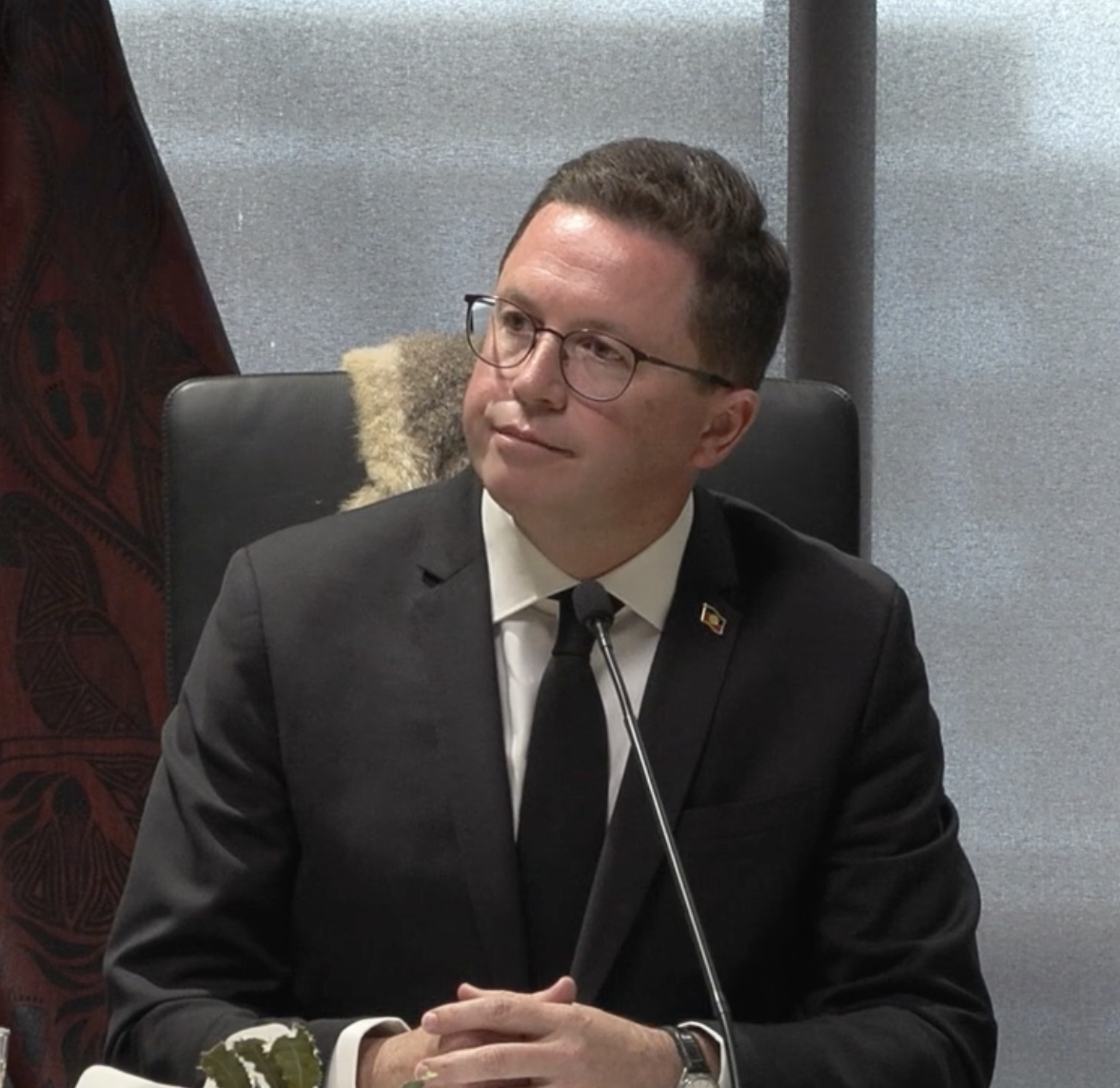
- Incumbent; Anthony Carbines since 27 June 2022
- Department of Justice and Community Safety
- Style: The Honourable
- Appointer: Governor of Victoria

Minister for Emergency Services
- Incumbent; Vicki Ward since 19 December 2024
- Department of Justice and Community Safety
- Style: The Honourable
- Appointer: Governor of Victoria

Minister for Ambulance Services
- Incumbent; Gabrielle Williams since 5 December 2022
- Department of Health
- Style: The Honourable
- Appointer: Governor of Victoria

The Victorian Minister for Police, the Minister for Emergency Services, and the Minister for Ambulance Services, are ministers in the Government of Victoria who have responsibilities which includes conduct and regulation of all police and services agencies and personnel and also deals with operational and event planning issues, and for fire and rescue services, and all ambulance services in Victoria, Australia.

The current Minister for Police, since 27 June 2022, is Anthony Carbines; the current Minister for Emergency Services, since 23 August 2021, is Jaclyn Symes; and the current Minister for Ambulance Services, since 27 June 2022, is Mary-Anne Thomas.

The ministers undertake their work through Victoria Police, the Victorian Office of Police Integrity, the State Emergency Service, Fire Rescue Victoria, the Country Fire Authority, and Ambulance Victoria.

== List of ministers ==
=== Police ===
| Order | Minister | Party affiliation | Ministerial title | Term start | Term end | Time in office | Notes |
|---|---|---|---|---|---|---|---|
| | Andre Haermeyer | Labor | Minister for Police and Emergency Services | 20 October 1999 | 25 January 2005 | 5 years, 97 days | |
| | Tim Holding | Labor | Minister for Police and Emergency Services | 25 January 2005 | 1 December 2006 | 1 year, 310 days | |
| | Bob Cameron | Labor | Minister for Police and Emergency Services | 1 December 2006 | 11 October 2010 | 3 years, 314 days | |
| | James Merlino | Labor | Minister for Police | 11 October 2010 | 2 December 2010 | 52 days | |
| | Peter Ryan | National | Minister for Police and Emergency Services; Minister for Bushfire Response | 2 December 2010 | 13 March 2013 | 2 years, 101 days | |
| | Kim Wells | Liberal | Minister for Police and Emergency Services; Minister for Bushfire Response | 13 March 2013 | 4 December 2014 | 1 year, 266 days | |
| | Wade Noonan | Labor | Minister for Police | 4 December 2014 | 23 May 2016 | 1 year, 171 days | |
| | Lisa Neville | Labor | Minister for Police | 23 May 2016 | 29 November 2018 | 6 years, 35 days | |
| | Lisa Neville | Labor | Minister for Police and Emergency Services | 29 November 2018 | 23 August 2021 | 6 years, 35 days | |
| | Lisa Neville | Labor | Minister for Police | 23 August 2021 | 27 June 2022 | 6 years, 35 days | |
| | Anthony Carbines | Labor | Minister for Police | 27 June 2022 | incumbent | 4 years, 72 days | |

=== Emergency Services ===
| Order | Minister | Party affiliation | Ministerial title | Term start | Term end | Time in office | Notes |
|---|---|---|---|---|---|---|---|
| | Andre Haermeyer | Labor | Minister for Police and Emergency Services | 20 October 1999 | 25 January 2005 | 5 years, 97 days | |
| | Tim Holding | Labor | Minister for Police and Emergency Services | 25 January 2005 | 1 December 2006 | 1 year, 310 days | |
| | Bob Cameron | Labor | Minister for Police and Emergency Services | 1 December 2006 | 11 October 2010 | 4 years, 1 day | |
| | Bob Cameron | Labor | Minister for Emergency Services | 11 October 2010 | 2 December 2010 | 4 years, 1 day | |
| | Peter Ryan | National | Minister for Police and Emergency Services; Minister for Bushfire Response | 2 December 2010 | 13 March 2013 | 2 years, 101 days | |
| | Kim Wells | Liberal | Minister for Police and Emergency Services; Minister for Bushfire Response | 13 March 2013 | 4 December 2014 | 1 year, 266 days | |
| | Jane Garrett | Labor | Minister for Emergency Services | 4 December 2014 | 10 June 2016 | 1 year, 189 days | |
| | James Merlino | Labor | Minister for Emergency Services | 10 June 2016 | 29 November 2018 | 2 years, 172 days | |
| | Lisa Neville | Labor | Minister for Police and Emergency Services | 29 November 2018 | 23 August 2021 | 2 years, 267 days | |
| | Jaclyn Symes | Labor | Minister for Emergency Services | 23 August 2021 | 19 December 2024 | 3 years, 118 days | |
| | Vicki Ward | Labor | Minister for Emergency Services | 19 December 2024 | incumbent | 1 year, 262 days | |

=== Ambulance Services ===
| Order | Minister | Party affiliation | Ministerial title | Term start | Term end | Time in office | Notes |
|---|---|---|---|---|---|---|---|
| | Jill Hennessy | Labor | Minister for Ambulance Services | 4 December 2014 | 29 November 2018 | 3 years, 360 days | |
| | Jenny Mikakos | Labor | Minister for Ambulance Services | 29 November 2018 | 26 September 2020 | 1 year, 302 days | |
| | Martin Foley | Labor | Minister for Ambulance Services | 26 September 2020 | 27 June 2022 | 1 year, 274 days | |
| | Mary-Anne Thomas | Labor | Minister for Ambulance Services | 27 June 2022 | 5 December 2022 | 161 days | |
| | Gabrielle Williams | Labor | Minister for Ambulance Services | 5 December 2022 | 2 October 2023 | 301 days | |
| | Mary-Anne Thomas | Labor | Minister for Ambulance Services | 2 October 2023 | Incumbent | 2 years, 340 days | |
