= Minister for Veterans (Victoria) =

Minister for Veterans of Victoria
- Victorian coat of arms

- Flag of Victoria

- Incumbent; Natalie Suleyman MP since 5 December 2022
- Style: The Honourable
- Member of: Parliament; Executive council
- Reports to: Premier
- Nominator: Premier
- Appointer: Governor; on the recommendation of the premier
- Term length: At the governor's pleasure
- Precursor: Minister for Veterans' Affairs
- Inaugural holder: Stephen Bracks MP
- Formation: 5 December 2002

The Minister for Veterans is a minister within the Executive Council of Victoria, Australia.

== Ministers ==
Order	MP	Party affiliation	Ministerial title	Term start	Term end	Time in office	Notes
1	Stephen Bracks MP	Labor	Minister for Veterans' Affairs	5 December 2002	30 July 2007	4 years, 237 days	
2	John Brumby MP	Labor	Minister for Veterans' Affairs	30 July 2007	2 December 2010	3 years, 125 days	
3	Hugh Delahunty MP	Nationals	Minister for Veterans' Affairs	2 December 2010	17 March 2014	3 years, 105 days	
4	Damian Drum MLC	Nationals	Minister for Veterans' Affairs	17 March 2014	4 December 2014	262 days	
5	John Eren MP	Labor	Minister for Veterans' Affairs	4 December 2014	29 November 2018	3 years, 360 days	
6	Robin Scott MP	Labor	Minister for Veterans	29 November 2018	15 June 2020	1 year, 199 days	
7	Shaun Leane MLC	Labor	Minister for Veterans	22 June 2020	5 December 2022	2 years, 166 days	
8	Natalie Suleyman MP	Labor	Minister for Veterans	5 December 2022	Incumbent	3 years, 350 days	

== See also ==
- Minister for Veterans' Affairs (Australia)
  - Minister for Veterans (New South Wales)
  - Minister for Veterans (Western Australia)
