= Minister for Industrial Relations (Victoria) =

Australian state ministry portfolio

Minister for Industrial Relations of Victoria
- Victorian coat of arms

- Flag of Victoria
- Incumbent; Jaclyn Symes MLC since 19 December 2024
- Style: The Honourable
- Member of: Parliament; Executive council
- Reports to: Premier
- Nominator: Premier
- Appointer: Governor on the recommendation of the premier
- Term length: At the governor's pleasure
- Precursor: Minister for Labour
- Inaugural holder: Monica Gould MLC
- Formation: 20 October 1999

The Minister for Industrial Relations is a ministry portfolio within the Executive Council of Victoria. The portfolio was previously the Minister for Labour.

== Ministers ==
Order	MP	Party affiliation	Ministerial title	Term start	Term end	Time in office	Notes
1	Monica Gould MLC	Labor	Minister for Industrial Relations	20 October 1999	12 February 2002	2 years, 115 days	
2	John Lenders MP	Labor	Minister for Industrial Relations	12 February 2002	1 December 2006	4 years, 292 days	
3	Rob Hulls MP	Labor	Minister for Industrial Relations	1 December 2006	29 December 2008	2 years, 28 days	
4	Martin Pakula MLC	Labor	Minister for Industrial Relations	29 December 2008	2 December 2010	1 year, 338 days	
5	Richard Dalla-Riva MLC	Liberal	Minister for Employment and Industrial Relations	2 December 2010	13 March 2013	2 years, 101 days	
6	Robert Clark MP	Liberal	Minister for Industrial Relations	13 March 2013	4 December 2014	1 year, 266 days	
7	Natalie Hutchins MP	Labor	Minister for Industrial Relations	4 December 2014	29 November 2018	3 years, 360 days	
8	Tim Pallas MP	Labor	Minister for Industrial Relations	29 November 2018	19 December 2024	6 years, 20 days	
9	Jaclyn Symes MLC	Labor	Minister for Industrial Relations	19 December 2024	Incumbent	1 year, 262 days	

== See also ==
- Minister for Employment and Workplace Relations
  - Minister for Industrial Relations (New South Wales)
