= Minister for Public and Active Transport =

State government minister in Victoria, Australia

Minister for Public and Active Transport of Victoria
- Victorian coat of arms

- Flag of Victoria
- Incumbent; Gabrielle Williams MP since 2 October 2023
- Department of Transport and Planning
- Style: The Honourable
- Member of: Parliament; Executive council
- Reports to: Premier
- Nominator: Premier
- Appointer: Governor on the recommendation of the premier
- Term length: At the governor's pleasure
- Inaugural holder: Alan Brown MP
- Formation: 6 October 1992

The Minister for Public and Active Transport is a minister within the Executive Council of Victoria.

== Ministers ==
Order	MP	Party affiliation	Ministerial title	Term start	Term end	Time in office	Notes
1	Alan Brown MP	Liberal	Minister for Public Transport	6 October 1992	3 April 1996	3 years, 180 days	
2	Lynne Kosky MP	Labor	Minister for Public Transport	1 December 2006	20 January 2010	3 years, 50 days	
3	Martin Pakula MLC	Labor	Minister for Public Transport	20 January 2010	2 December 2010	316 days	
4	Terry Mulder MP	Liberal	Minister for Public Transport	2 December 2010	4 December 2014	4 years, 2 days	
5	Jacinta Allan MP	Labor	Minister for Public Transport	4 December 2014	29 November 2018	3 years, 360 days	
6	Melissa Horne MP	Labor	Minister for Public Transport	29 November 2018	22 June 2020	1 year, 206 days	
7	Ben Carroll MP	Labor	Minister for Public Transport	22 June 2020	2 October 2023	3 years, 102 days	
8	Gabrielle Williams MP	Labor	Minister for Public and Active Transport	2 October 2023	Incumbent	2 years, 340 days	
