= Minister for Local Government (Victoria) =

Minister for Local Government of Victoria
- Victorian coat of arms

- Flag of Victoria

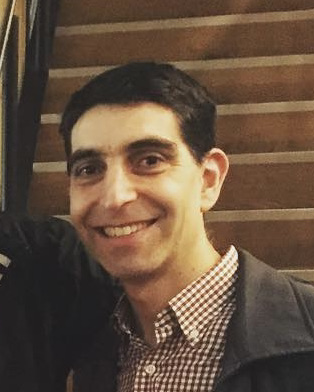
- Incumbent; Paul Hamer since 19 December 2024
- Department of Government Services
- Style: The Honourable
- Member of: Parliament; Executive council
- Reports to: Premier
- Nominator: Premier
- Appointer: Governor; on the recommendation of the Premier
- Term length: At the governor's pleasure
- Formation: 16 July 1958
- First holder: Murray Porter

The Minister for Local Government in the government of the Australian state of Victoria is the minister responsible for supervising the activities of local government councils in the state, recommending allocation of grants to local governments for projects, assessing processes for redistributing municipal boundaries according to population, overseeing tendering processes for council services, airing any concerns of local governments at Cabinet meetings and co-ordinating council community and infrastructure work at a state level. The minister achieves the government's objectives through oversight of Local Government Victoria of the Department of Government Services.

All ministers responsible for local government since 1964 have been known as the Minister for Local Government, apart from Caroline Hogg (1991-1992), whose title was Minister for Ethnic, Municipal and Community Affairs.

== List of ministers for local government ==
Order	Minister	Party affiliation	Ministerial title	Term start	Term end	Time in office	Notes
1	Murray Porter MLA	Liberal Country	Minister for Local Government	16 July 1958	27 June 1964	5 years, 347 days	
2	Rupert Hamer MLC	Liberal	Minister for Local Government	27 June 1964	29 April 1971	6 years, 306 days	
3	Alan Hunt MLC	Liberal	Minister for Local Government	29 April 1971	16 May 1979	8 years, 17 days	
4	Digby Crozier MLC	Liberal	Minister for Local Government	16 May 1979	5 June 1981	2 years, 20 days	
5	Lou Lieberman MLA	Liberal	Minister for Local Government	5 June 1981	8 April 1982	307 days	
6	Frank Wilkes MLA	Labor	Minister for Local Government	8 April 1982	2 May 1985	3 years, 24 days	
7	Jim Simmonds MLA	Labor	Minister for Local Government	2 May 1985	13 October 1988	3 years, 164 days	
8	Andrew McCutcheon MLA	Labor	Minister for Local Government	13 October 1988	7 February 1989	117 days	
9	Maureen Lyster MLC	Labor	Minister for Local Government	7 February 1989	18 January 1991	1 year, 345 days	
10	Caroline Hogg MLC	Labor	Minister for Ethnic, Municipal and Community Affairs	18 January 1991	6 October 1992	1 year, 262 days	
11	Roger Hallam MLC	National	Minister for Local Government	6 October 1992	3 April 1996	3 years, 180 days	
12	Rob Maclellan MP	Liberal	Minister for Local Government	3 April 1996	20 October 1999	3 years, 200 days	
13	Bob Cameron MP	Labor	Minister for Local Government	20 October 1999	5 December 2002	3 years, 46 days	
14	Candy Broad MLC	Labor	Minister for Local Government	5 December 2002	1 December 2006	3 years, 361 days	
15	Richard Wynne MP	Labor	Minister for Local Government	1 December 2006	2 December 2010	4 years, 1 day	
16	Jeanette Powell MLC	National	Minister for Local Government	2 December 2010	17 March 2014	3 years, 166 days	
17	Tim Bull MP	National	Minister for Local Government	17 March 2014	4 December 2014	262 days	
18	Natalie Hutchins MP	Labor	Minister for Local Government	4 December 2014	13 September 2017	2 years, 283 days	
19	Marlene Kairouz MP	Labor	Minister for Local Government	13 September 2017	29 November 2018	1 year, 77 days	
20	Adem Somyurek MLC	Labor	Minister for Local Government	29 November 2018	15 June 2020	1 year, 168 days	
21	Shaun Leane MLC	Labor	Minister for Local Government	15 June 2020	27 June 2022	2 years, 12 days	
22	Melissa Horne MP	Labor	Minister for Local Government	27 June 2022	19 December 2024	2 years, 206 days	
23	Nick Staikos MP	Labor	Minister for Local Government	19 December 2024	15 April 2026	1 year, 117 days	
24	Paul Hamer MP	Labor	Minister for Local Government	15 April 2026	Incumbent	211 days	
