= Minister for Racing (Victoria) =

Minister within the Cabinet of Victoria

Minister for Racing of Victoria
- Victorian coat of arms

- Flag of Victoria

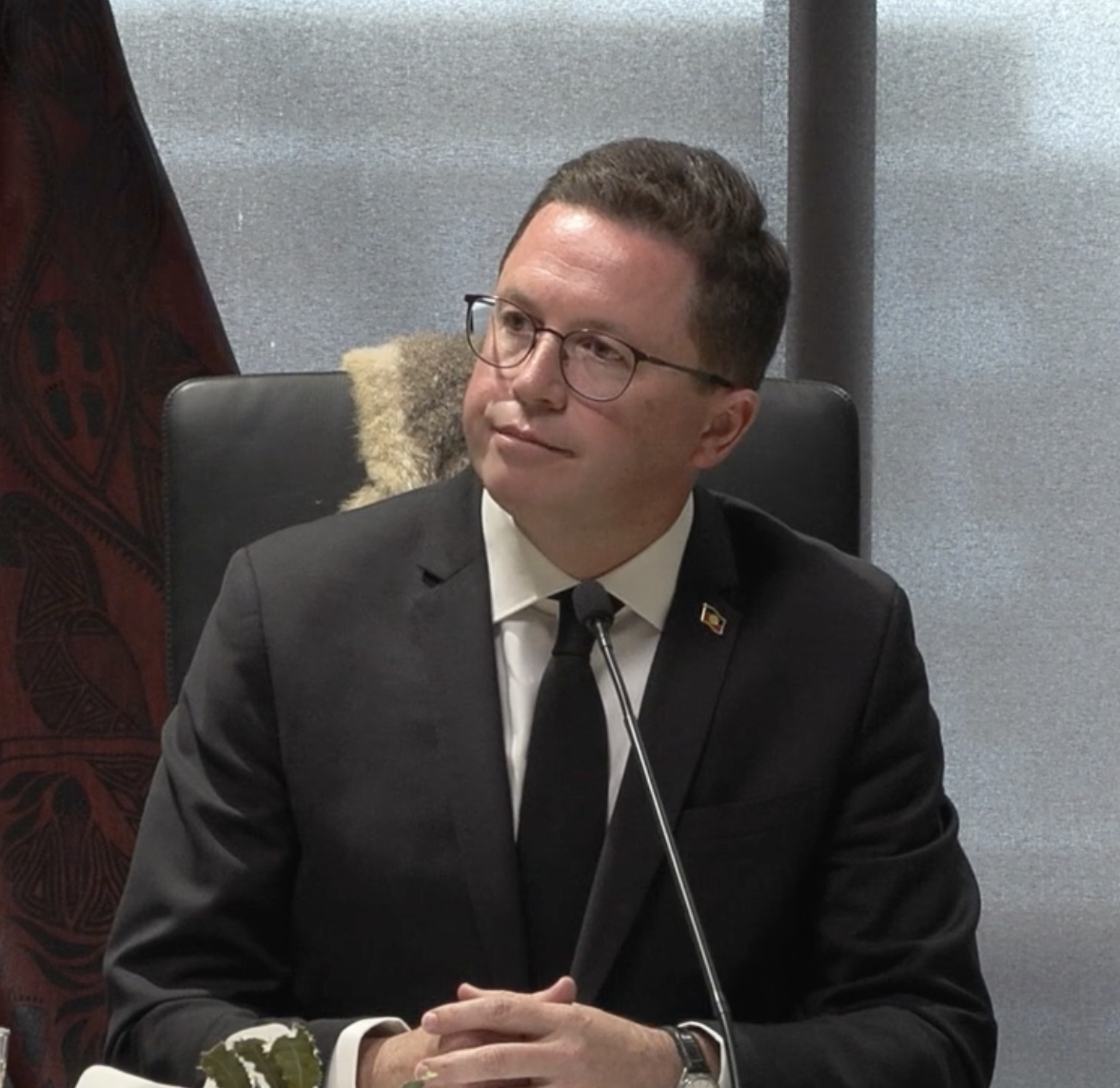
- Incumbent; Anthony Carbines MP since 5 December 2022
- Style: The Honourable
- Member of: Parliament; Executive council
- Reports to: Premier
- Nominator: Premier
- Appointer: Governor on the recommendation of the premier
- Term length: At the governor's pleasure
- Precursor: Minister for Sport, Recreation and Racing
- Inaugural holder: Tom Reynolds
- Formation: 6 October 1992

The Minister for Racing is a minister within the Executive Council of Victoria.

== Ministers for Racing ==
| Order | MP | Party affiliation | Ministerial title | Term start | Term end | Time in office | Notes |
|---|---|---|---|---|---|---|---|
| 1 | Tom Reynolds MP | Liberal | Minister for Sport, Recreation and Racing | 6 October 1992 | 3 April 1996 | 3 years, 180 days | |
| 2 | Rob Hulls MP | Labor | Minister for Racing | 20 October 1999 | 5 December 2002 | 3 years, 46 days | |
| 3 | John Pandazopoulos MP | Labor | Minister for Racing | 5 December 2002 | 1 December 2006 | 3 years, 361 days | |
| (2) | Rob Hulls MP | Labor | Minister for Racing | 1 December 2006 | 2 December 2010 | 4 years, 1 day | |
| 4 | Denis Napthine MP | Liberal | Minister for Racing | 2 December 2010 | 4 December 2014 | 4 years, 2 days | |
| 5 | Martin Pakula MP | Labor | Minister for Racing | 4 December 2014 | 22 June 2020 | 5 years, 201 days | |
| 6 | Anthony Carbines MP | Labor | Minister for Racing | 27 June 2022 | Incumbent | 4 years, 72 days | |
