= Minister for Finance (Victoria) =

Australian state ministry portfolio

Minister for Finance of Victoria
- Victorian coat of arms

- Flag of Victoria
- Style: The Honourable
- Member of: Parliament; Executive council
- Reports to: Premier
- Nominator: Premier
- Appointer: Governor; on the recommendation of the premier
- Term length: At the governor's pleasure
- Precursor: Minister for Financial Services; Minister for Finance, WorkCover and the Transport Accident Commission
- Inaugural holder: Tony Sheehan MP
- Formation: 18 January 1991

The Minister for Finance is a ministry portfolio within the Executive Council of Victoria, Australia.

The position was discontinued in Daniel Andrews' second ministry, but was reformed in Jacinta Allan's first ministry.

== Ministers for Finance ==
Order	MP	Party affiliation	Ministerial title	Term start	Term end	Time in office	Notes
1	Tony Sheehan MP	Labor	Minister for Finance	18 January 1991	28 January 1992	1 year, 10 days	
2	John Harrowfield MP	Labor	Minister for Finance	28 January 1992	6 October 1992	252 days	
3	Ian Smith MP	Liberal	Minister for Finance	6 October 1992	30 May 1995	2 years, 236 days	
4	Jeffrey Kennett MP	Liberal	Minister for Finance	1 June 1995	13 June 1995	12 days	
5	Roger Hallam MLC	Nationals	Minister for Finance	13 June 1995	20 October 1999	4 years, 129 days	
6	John Brumby MP	Labor	Minister for Finance	20 October 1999	22 May 2000	215 days	
7	Lynne Kosky MP	Labor	Minister for Finance	22 May 2000	12 February 2002	1 year, 266 days	
8	John Lenders MLC	Labor	Minister for Finance	12 February 2002	1 December 2006	4 years, 9 months, 19 days	
9	Tim Holding MP	Labor	Minister for Finance, WorkCover and the Transport Accident Commission	1 December 2006	2 December 2010	4 years, 1 day	
10	Robert Clark MP	Liberal	Minister for Finance	2 December 2010	4 December 2014	4 years, 2 days	
11	Robin Scott MP	Labor	Minister for Finance	4 December 2014	29 November 2018	3 years, 360 days	
12	Danny Pearson MP	Labor	Minister for Finance	19 December 2024	Incumbent	3 years, 35 days	

== Ministers for Financial Services ==
Order	MP	Party affiliation	Ministerial title	Term start	Term end	Time in office	Notes
1	Andre Haermeyer MP	Labor	Minister for Financial Services	25 January 2005	1 December 2006	1 year, 310 days	
2	John Lenders MLC	Labor	Minister for Financial Services	29 December 2008	2 December 2010	1 year, 338 days	

== Ministers for Financial Services Industry ==
Order	MP	Party affiliation	Ministerial title	Term start	Term end	Time in office	Notes
1	Tim Holding MP	Labor	Minister for Financial Services Industry	5 December 2002	1 December 2006	3 years, 361 days	

== See also ==
- Ministry of Finance
- Minister for Finance (Australia)
- Minister for Finance (New South Wales)
