= Minister for Treaty and First Peoples =

Ministerial position in the government of Victoria, Australia

- Victorian coat of arms

- Flag of Victoria
- Incumbent; Ros Spence MP since 18 December 2025
- Style: The Honourable (formal); Minister (spoken)
- Member of: Parliament; Executive council
- Reports to: Premier
- Seat: Melbourne
- Nominator: Premier
- Appointer: Governor on the recommendation of the Premier
- Term length: At the governor's pleasure
- Formation: 5 December 1967
- First holder: Edward Meagher MP

The Minister for Treaty and First Peoples, previously the Minister for Aboriginal Affairs, is the Victorian Government minister with responsibility for the administration and development of health, education, justice, and social services for Indigenous communities. The individual who holds this office achieves the Government's objectives through oversight of the Indigenous branch of the Department of Premier and Cabinet and other government ministries and agencies. The current Minister for Treaty and First Peoples is Natalie Hutchins, a representative of the Labor Party, who has held the position since October 2023.

== List of ministers ==
Order	MP	Party affiliation	Ministerial title	Term start	Term end	Time in office	Notes
1	Edward Meagher MP	Liberal	Minister for Aboriginal Affairs	5 December 1967	23 August 1972	4 years, 262 days	
2	Pat Dickie MLC	Liberal	Minister for Aboriginal Affairs	23 August 1972	19 February 1975	2 years, 180 days	
3	Brian Mier MLC	Labor	Minister for Aboriginal Affairs	10 August 1990	15 August 1991	1 year, 5 days	
4	Tom Roper MP	Labor	Minister for Aboriginal Affairs	15 August 1991	6 October 1992	1 year, 52 days	
5	Marie Tehan MP	Liberal	Minister for Aboriginal Affairs	6 October 1992	9 November 1992	34 days	
6	Michael John MP	Liberal	Minister responsible for Aboriginal Affairs	9 November 1992	3 April 1996	3 years, 146 days	
7	Ann Henderson MP	Liberal	Minister responsible for Aboriginal Affairs	3 April 1996	20 October 1999	3 years, 200 days	
8	Keith Hamilton MP	Labor	Minister for Aboriginal Affairs	20 October 1999	5 December 2002	3 years, 46 days	
9	Gavin Jennings MLC	Labor	Minister for Aboriginal Affairs	5 December 2002	3 August 2007	4 years, 241 days	
10	Richard Wynne MP	Labor	Minister for Aboriginal Affairs	3 August 2007	2 December 2010	3 years, 121 days	
11	Jeanette Powell MLC	National	Minister for Aboriginal Affairs	2 December 2010	17 March 2014	3 years, 105 days	
12	Tim Bull MP	National	Minister for Aboriginal Affairs	17 March 2014	4 December 2014	262 days	
13	Natalie Hutchins MP	Labor	Minister for Aboriginal Affairs	4 December 2014	29 November 2018	3 years, 360 days	
(9)	Gavin Jennings MLC	Labor	Minister for Aboriginal Affairs	29 November 2018	23 March 2020	1 year, 115 days	
14	Gabrielle Williams MP	Labor	Minister for Aboriginal Affairs	23 March 2020	27 June 2022	2 years, 96 days	
14	Gabrielle Williams MP	Labor	Minister for Treaty and First Peoples	27 June 2022	27 September 2023	1 year, 92 days	
(13)	Natalie Hutchins MP	Labor	Minister for Treaty and First Peoples	2 October 2023	18 December 2025	2 years, 77 days	
15	Ros Spence MP	Labor	Minister for Treaty and First Peoples	18 December 2025	Incumbent	263 days	
