= Minister for Children (Victoria) =

Australian state ministry portfolio

Minister for Children of Victoria
- Victorian coat of arms

- Flag of Victoria
- Incumbent; Lizzie Blandthorn MLC since 2 October 2023
- Style: The Honourable
- Member of: Parliament; Cabinet; Executive council
- Reports to: Premier
- Nominator: Premier
- Appointer: Governor on the recommendation of the premier
- Term length: At the governor's pleasure
- Inaugural holder: Lisa Neville MP
- Formation: 1 December 2006

The Minister for Children is a ministry portfolio within the Executive Council of Victoria.

== Ministers ==
Order	MP	Party affiliation	Ministerial title	Term start	Term end	Time in office	Notes
1	Lisa Neville MP	Labor	Minister for Children	1 December 2006	3 August 2007	245 days	
2	Maxine Morand MP	Labor	Minister for Children and Early Childhood Development	3 August 2007	2 December 2010	3 years, 121 days	
3	Wendy Lovell MLC	Liberal	Minister for Children and Early Childhood Development	2 December 2010	4 December 2014	4 years, 2 days	
4	Jenny Mikakos MLC	Labor	Minister for Families and Children	4 December 2014	29 November 2018	3 years, 360 days	
5	Lizzie Blandthorn MLC	Labor	Minister for Children	2 October 2023	Incumbent	2 years, 340 days	
