= Minister for Sport (Victoria) =

Former ministry within the Cabinet of Victoria

Minister for Sport of Victoria
- Victorian coat of arms

- Flag of Victoria
- Style: The Honourable
- Member of: Parliament; Executive council
- Reports to: Premier
- Nominator: Premier
- Appointer: Governor on the recommendation of the premier
- Term length: At the governor's pleasure
- Inaugural holder: Brian Dixon MP
- Formation: 30 May 1973
- Succession: Minister for Tourism, Sport and Major Events

The Minister for Sport was a ministry portfolio within the Executive Council of Victoria.

In November 2018, under the Second Andrews ministry, the portfolio, along with portfolios for Tourism and Major Events, were amalgamated into one called the Minister for Tourism, Sport and Major Events.

== Ministers for Sport ==
Order	MP	Party affiliation	Ministerial title	Term start	Term end	Time in office	Notes
1	Brian Dixon MP	Liberal	Minister for Youth, Sport and Recreation	30 May 1973	8 April 1982	8 years, 313 days	
2	Neil Trezise MP	Labor	Minister for Youth, Sport and Recreation	8 April 1982	6 October 1992	10 years, 181 days	
3	Tom Reynolds MP	Liberal	Minister for Sport, Recreation and Racing	6 October 1992	3 April 1996	3 years, 180 days	
3	Tom Reynolds MP	Liberal	Minister for Sport	3 April 1996	20 October 1999	3 years, 200 days	
4	Justin Madden MLC	Labor	Minister for Sport and Recreation	20 October 1999	1 December 2006	7 years, 42 days	
5	James Merlino MP	Labor	Minister for Sport, Recreation and Youth Affairs	1 December 2006	2 December 2010	4 years, 1 day	
6	Hugh Delahunty MP	Nationals	Minister for Sport and Recreation	2 December 2010	17 March 2014	3 years, 105 days	
7	Damian Drum MLC	Nationals	Minister for Sport and Recreation	17 March 2014	4 December 2014	262 days	
8	John Eren MP	Labor	Minister for Sport	4 December 2014	29 November 2018	3 years, 360 days	
9	Martin Pakula MP	Labor	Minister for Tourism, Sport and Major Events	29 November 2018	27 June 2022	3 years, 210 days	
10	Steve Dimopoulos MP	Labor	Minister for Tourism, Sport and Major Events	27 June 2022	Incumbent	4 years, 72 days	

== Ministers for Community Sport ==
Ministers for Community Sport of Victoria
- Incumbent; Ros Spence MP since 23 March 2020
- Style: The Honourable
- Member of: Parliament; Executive council
- Reports to: Premier
- Nominator: Premier
- Appointer: Governor on the recommendation of the premier
- Term length: At the governor's pleasure
- Inaugural holder: Ros Spence MP
- Formation: 23 March 2020

Order	MP	Party affiliation	Ministerial title	Term start	Term end	Time in office	Notes
1	Ros Spence MP	Labor	Minister for Community Sport	23 March 2020	Incumbent	6 years, 168 days	

== See also ==
- Minister for Sport (Australia)
  - Minister for Sport (New South Wales)
  - Minister for Sport and Recreation (Northern Territory)
  - Minister for Sport and Recreation (Western Australia)
