= Minister for Major Projects (Victoria) =

Australian state ministry portfolio

Minister for Major Projects of Victoria
- Victorian coat of arms

- Flag of Victoria
- Style: The Honourable
- Member of: Parliament; Executive Council
- Reports to: Premier
- Nominator: Premier
- Appointer: Governor on the recommendation of the premier
- Term length: At the governor's pleasure
- Inaugural holder: Evan Walker MLC
- Formation: 7 February 1989
- Final holder: Jacinta Allan MP
- Abolished: 29 November 2018

The Minister for Major Projects was a minister within the Executive Council of Victoria.

== Ministers ==
Order	MP	Party affiliation	Ministerial title	Term start	Term end	Time in office	Notes
1	Evan Walker MLC	Labor	Minister for Major Projects	7 February 1989	10 August 1990	1 year, 184 days	
2	David White MLC	Labor	Minister for Major Projects	10 August 1990	18 January 1991	161 days	
3	Jim Kennan MP	Labor	Minister for Major Projects	18 January 1991	6 October 1992	1 year, 262 days	
4	Mark Birrell MLC	Liberal	Minister for Major Projects	6 October 1992	3 April 1996	3 years, 180 days	
5	John Pandazopoulos MP	Labor	Minister for Major Projects and Tourism	20 October 1999	12 February 2002	2 years, 115 days	
6	Peter Batchelor MP	Labor	Minister for Major Projects	12 February 2002	25 January 2005	2 years, 348 days	
7	John Lenders MLC	Labor	Minister for Major Projects	25 January 2005	1 December 2006	1 year, 310 days	
8	Theo Theophanous MLC	Labor	Minister for Major Projects	1 December 2006	29 December 2008	2 years, 28 days	
9	Tim Pallas MP	Labor	Minister for Major Projects	29 December 2008	2 December 2010	1 year, 338 days	
10	Denis Napthine MP	Liberal	Minister for Major Projects	2 December 2010	13 March 2013	2 years, 101 days	
11	David Hodgett MP	Liberal	Minister for Major Projects	13 March 2013	4 December 2014	1 year, 266 days	
12	Jacinta Allan MP	Labor	Minister for Major Projects	23 May 2016	29 November 2018	2 years, 190 days	
