= Minister for Planning (Victoria) =

Australian state ministry portfolio

Minister for Planning of Victoria
- Victorian coat of arms

- Flag of Victoria

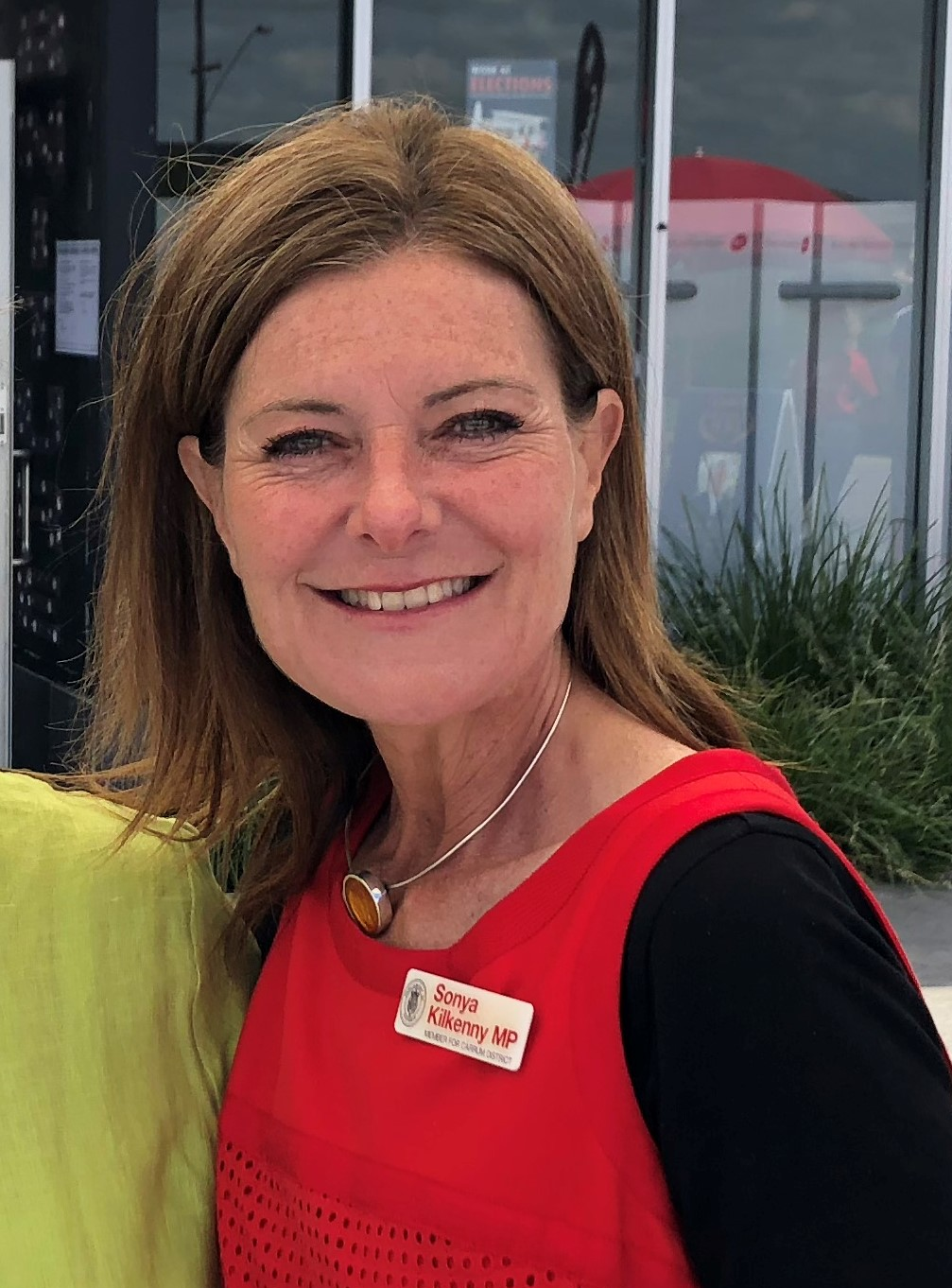
- Incumbent; Sonya Kilkenny MP since 5 December 2022
- Style: The Honourable
- Member of: Parliament; Executive council
- Reports to: Premier
- Nominator: Premier
- Appointer: Governor on the recommendation of the premier
- Term length: At the governor's pleasure
- Precursor: Minister for Planning and Environment; Minister for Planning and Urban Growth; Minister for Planning and Housing; Minister for Planning and Local Government
- Inaugural holder: Alan Hunt MLC
- Formation: 30 May 1973

The Minister for Planning is a ministry portfolio within the Executive Council of Victoria.

== Ministers ==
Order	MP	Party affiliation	Ministerial title	Term start	Term end	Time in office	Notes
1	Alan Hunt MLC	Liberal	Minister for Planning	30 May 1973	31 March 1976	2 years, 306 days	
2	Geoff Hayes MP	Liberal	Minister for Planning	31 March 1976	16 August 1978	2 years, 138 days	
(1)	Alan Hunt MLC	Liberal	Minister for Planning	16 August 1978	16 March 1979	273 days	
3	Lou Lieberman MP	Liberal	Minister for Planning	16 March 1979	5 June 1981	2 years, 20 days	
4	Evan Walker MLC	Labor	Minister for Planning	8 April 1982	1 September 1983	1 year, 146 days	
4	Evan Walker MLC	Labor	Minister for Planning and Environment	1 September 1983	25 February 1986	2 years, 177 days	
5	Jim Kennan MLC	Labor	Minister for Planning and Environment	25 February 1986	14 December 1987	1 year, 292 days	
6	Tom Roper MP	Labor	Minister for Planning and Environment	14 December 1987	13 October 1988	304 days	
7	Andrew McCutcheon MP	Labor	Minister for Planning and Urban Growth	10 August 1990	18 January 1991	161 days	
7	Andrew McCutcheon MP	Labor	Minister for Planning and Housing	18 January 1991	6 October 1992	1 year, 262 days	
8	Robert R C MacLellan MP	Liberal	Minister for Planning	6 October 1992	3 April 1996	3 years, 180 days	
8	Robert R C MacLellan MP	Liberal	Minister for Planning and Local Government	3 April 1996	20 October 1999	3 years, 200 days	
9	John Thwaites MP	Labor	Minister for Planning	20 October 1999	12 February 2002	2 years, 115 days	
10	Mary Delahunty MP	Labor	Minister for Planning	12 February 2002	25 January 2005	2 years, 348 days	
11	Rob Hulls MP	Labor	Minister for Planning	25 January 2005	1 December 2006	1 year, 310 days	
12	Justin Madden MLC	Labor	Minister for Planning	1 December 2006	2 December 2010	4 years, 1 day	
13	Matthew Guy MLC	Liberal	Minister for Planning	2 December 2010	4 December 2014	4 years, 2 days	
14	Richard Wynne MP	Labor	Minister for Planning	4 December 2014	27 June 2022	7 years, 205 days	
15	Lizzie Blandthorn MP	Labor	Minister for Planning	27 June 2022	5 December 2022	161 days	
16	Sonya Kilkenny MP	Labor	Minister for Planning	5 December 2022	Incumbent	3 years, 276 days	

== See also ==
- Minister for Planning (New South Wales)
- Minister for Planning (Western Australia)
