= Minister for Multicultural Affairs (Victoria) =

Australian state ministry portfolio

Minister for Multicultural Affairs of Victoria
- Victorian coat of arms

- Flag of Victoria
- Incumbent; Ingrid Stitt MLC since 2 October 2023
- Style: The Honourable
- Member of: Parliament; Executive council
- Reports to: Premier
- Nominator: Premier
- Appointer: Governor on the recommendation of the premier
- Term length: At the governor's pleasure
- Precursor: Minister for Multicultural Affairs and Citizenship
- Inaugural holder: Jeff Kennett
- Formation: 3 April 1996

The Minister for Multicultural Affairs is a minister within the Executive Council of Victoria.

== Ministers for Multicultural Affairs ==
Order	MP	Party affiliation	Ministerial title	Term start	Term end	Time in office	Notes
1	Jeffrey Kennett MP	Liberal	Minister for Multicultural Affairs	3 April 1996	20 October 1999	3 years, 200 days	
2	Stephen Bracks MP	Labor	Minister for Multicultural Affairs	20 October 1999	30 July 2007	7 years, 283 days	
3	John Brumby MP	Labor	Minister for Multicultural Affairs	30 July 2007	2 December 2010	3 years, 125 days	
4	Nicholas Kotsiras MP	Liberal	Minister for Multicultural Affairs and Citizenship	2 December 2010	17 March 2014	3 years, 105 days	
5	Matthew Guy MLC	Liberal	Minister for Multicultural Affairs and Citizenship	17 March 2014	4 December 2014	262 days	
6	Robin Scott MP	Labor	Minister for Multicultural Affairs	4 December 2014	29 November 2018	3 years, 360 days	
7	Richard Wynne MP	Labor	Minister for Multicultural Affairs	29 November 2018	23 March 2020	1 year, 115 days	
8	Ros Spence MP	Labor	Minister for Multicultural Affairs	23 March 2020	5 December 2022	2 years, 257 days	
9	Colin Brooks MP	Labor	Minister for Multicultural Affairs	5 December 2022	2 October 2023	301 days	
10	Ingrid Stitt MLC	Labor	Minister for Multicultural Affairs	2 October 2023	Incumbent	2 years, 340 days	
