= Minister for Corrections (Victoria) =

Australian state ministry portfolio

Minister for Corrections of Victoria
- Victorian coat of arms

- Flag of Victoria
- Incumbent; Enver Erdogan MLC since 5 December 2022
- Style: The Honourable
- Member of: Parliament; Executive council
- Reports to: Premier
- Nominator: Premier
- Appointer: Governor on the recommendation of the premier
- Term length: At the governor's pleasure
- Precursor: Minister of Justice
- Inaugural holder: John Wood MP
- Formation: 14 November 1861

The Minister for Corrections is a minister within the Executive Council of Victoria.

== Ministers ==
| Order | MP | Party affiliation | Ministerial title | Term start | Term end | Time in office | Notes |
|---|---|---|---|---|---|---|---|
| | John Wood MP | | Minister of Justice | 14 November 1861 | 27 June 1863 | 1 year, 225 days | |
| | Archibald Michie MP | | Minister of Justice | 14 July 1863 | 18 July 1866 | 3 years, 4 days | |
| | Samuel Bindon MP | | Minister of Justice | 18 July 1866 | 6 May 1868 | 1 year, 293 days | |
| | Thomas Fellows MLC | | Minister of Justice | 6 May 1868 | 11 July 1868 | 66 days | |
| | James Casey MP | | Minister of Justice | 11 July 1868 | 20 September 1869 | 1 year, 71 days | |
| | James M Grant MP | | Minister of Justice | 9 August 1875 | 20 October 1875 | 72 days | |
| | John Madden MP | | Minister of Justice | 20 October 1875 | 21 May 1877 | 1 year, 213 days | |
| | James M Grant MP | | Minister of Justice | 22 May 1877 | 5 March 1880 | 2 years, 288 days | |
| | John Madden MP | | Minister of Justice | 5 March 1880 | 3 August 1880 | 151 days | |
| | William Vale MP | | Minister of Justice | 3 August 1880 | 9 July 1881 | 340 days | |
| | Robert Stirling Hore Anderson MLC | | Minister of Justice | 8 March 1883 | 26 October 1883 | 232 days | |
| | Henry Cuthbert MLC | | Minister of Justice | 18 February 1886 | 5 November 1890 | 4 years, 260 days | |
| | John M Davies MLC | | Minister of Justice | 5 November 1890 | 16 February 1892 | 1 year, 103 days | |
| | Mal Sandon MP | Labor | Minister for Corrections | 10 August 1990 | 6 October 1992 | 2 years, 57 days | |
| | Pat McNamara MP | Nationals | Minister for Corrections | 6 October 1992 | 3 April 1996 | 3 years, 180 days | |
| | Bill McGrath MP | Nationals | Minister for Corrections | 3 April 1996 | 20 October 1999 | 3 years, 200 days | |
| | Andre Haermeyer MP | Labor | Minister for Corrections | 20 October 1999 | 25 January 2005 | 5 years, 97 days | |
| | Tim Holding MP | Labor | Minister for Corrections | 25 January 2005 | 1 December 2006 | 1 year, 310 days | |
| | Bob Cameron MP | Labor | Minister for Corrections | 1 December 2006 | 2 December 2010 | 4 years, 1 day | |
| | Andrew McIntosh MP | Liberal | Minister for Corrections | 2 December 2010 | 16 April 2013 | 2 years, 135 days | |
| | Edward O'Donohue MLC | Liberal | Minister for Corrections | 22 April 2013 | 4 December 2014 | 1 year, 226 days | |
| | Wade Noonan MP | Labor | Minister for Corrections | 4 December 2014 | 23 May 2016 | 1 year, 171 days | |
| | Gayle Tierney MLC | Labor | Minister for Corrections | 9 November 2016 | 29 November 2018 | 2 years, 20 days | |
| | Ben Carroll MP | Labor | Minister for Corrections | 29 November 2018 | 22 June 2020 | 1 year, 206 days | |
| | Natalie Hutchins MP | Labor | Minister for Corrections | 22 June 2020 | 27 June 2022 | 2 years, 5 days | |
| | Sonya Kilkenny MP | Labor | Minister for Corrections | 4 July 2022 | 5 December 2022 | 154 days | |
| | Enver Erdogan MLC | Labor | Minister for Corrections | 5 December 2022 | Incumbent | 3 years, 276 days | |

== See also ==
- Minister for Corrections (New South Wales)
