= Third Andrews ministry =

71st ministry of Victoria, Australia

- 71st ministry of Victoria, Australia
- Date formed: 5 December 2022
- Date dissolved: 27 September 2023

People and organisations
- Monarch: Charles III
- Governor: Linda Dessau (until 30 June 2023); Margaret Gardner (since 9 August 2023)
- Premier: Daniel Andrews
- Deputy premier: Jacinta Allan
- No. of ministers: 22
- Member party: Labor
- Status in legislature: Majority government
- Opposition cabinet: Pesutto Shadow Cabinet
- Opposition party: Liberal–National Coalition
- Opposition leader: John Pesutto (Liberal)

History
- Election: 2022 state election
- Predecessor: Second Andrews ministry
- Successor: Allan ministry

The Third Andrews ministry was the 71st ministry of the Government of Victoria. The Labor government, led by Premier Daniel Andrews and Deputy Premier Jacinta Allan, was officially sworn in on 5 December 2022, following the party's third consecutive victory at the 2022 state election, which was held on 26 November 2022.

At the time of its formation the ministry consisted of 22 ministers, fourteen of whom were women.

The Third Andrews ministry succeeded the Second Andrews ministry. It dissolved upon the resignation of Daniel Andrews as premier on 27 September 2023 and was succeeded by the Allan ministry.

== Composition ==
The cabinet composition of the first arrangement of the Third Andrews Ministry was first announced on 2 December 2022. As a result of the defection of seven MPs from the Labor Right to Andrew's Labor Left faction, Shaun Leane from the previous ministry was removed from cabinet by the caucus. In compensation, Leane would be nominated as the President of the Legislative Council in the upcoming parliament. Jaala Pulford from the previous ministry retired at the 2022 election, creating a vacancy in the cabinet. In their places, Enver Erdogan and Natalie Suleyman were promoted to the cabinet.

The ministerial portfolios were then announced on 5 December 2022, with ministers (except Harriet Shing) sworn in that day. Shing was sworn in on 14 December when her re-election to the Legislative Council was declared and finalised, with Andrews holding on to her portfolios in the interim.

The composition lasted until the resignation of Andrews on 27 September 2023. During this period, only the portfolios of the Minister for Commonwealth Games Delivery (held by Jacinta Allan) and the Minister for Commonwealth Games Legacy (held by Harriet Shing) were abolished on 20 July 2023 due to the cancellation of the 2026 Commonwealth Games earlier in the month.

Minister	Portfolio	Image
Daniel Andrews, MP	Premier	
Jacinta Allan, MP	Deputy Premier; Minister for Transport and Infrastructure; Minister for the Suburban Rail Loop; Minister for Commonwealth Games Delivery (until 20 July 2023)	
Jaclyn Symes, MLC	Leader of the Government in the Legislative Council; Attorney-General; Minister for Emergency Services	
Gayle Tierney, MLC	Minister for Training and Skills; Minister for Higher Education; Minister for Agriculture	
Tim Pallas, MP	Treasurer; Minister for Industrial Relations; Minister for Trade and Investment	
Lizzie Blandthorn, MLC	Deputy Leader of the Government in the Legislative Council; Minister for Disability, Ageing and Carers; Minister for Child Protection and Family Services	
Colin Brooks, MP	Minister for Housing; Minister for Multicultural Affairs	
Anthony Carbines, MP	Minister for Police; Minister for Crime Prevention; Minister for Racing	
Ben Carroll, MP	Minister for Industry and Innovation; Minister for Manufacturing Sovereignty; Minister for Employment; Minister for Public Transport	
Lily D'Ambrosio, MP	Minister for Climate Action; Minister for Energy and Resources; Minister for the State Electricity Commission	
Steve Dimopoulos, MP	Minister for Tourism, Sport and Major Events; Minister for Creative Industries	
Melissa Horne, MP	Minister for Casino, Gaming and Liquor Regulation; Minister for Local Government; Minister for Ports and Freight; Minister for Roads and Road Safety	
Natalie Hutchins, MP	Minister for Education; Minister for Women	
Sonya Kilkenny, MP	Minister for Planning; Minister for Outdoor Recreation	
Danny Pearson, MP	Minister for Government Services; Assistant Treasurer; Minister for WorkSafe and the TAC; Minister for Consumer Affairs	
Harriet Shing, MLC	Minister for Water; Minister for Regional Development; Minister for Equality; Minister for Commonwealth Games Legacy (until 20 July 2023)	
Ros Spence, MP	Minister for Prevention of Family Violence; Minister for Community Sport; Minister for Suburban Development	
Ingrid Stitt, MLC	Minister for Early Childhood and Pre-Prep; Minister for the Environment	
Mary-Anne Thomas, MP	Leader of the House; Minister for Health; Minister for Health Infrastructure; Minister for Medical Research	
Gabrielle Williams, MP	Minister for Mental Health; Minister for Ambulance Services; Minister for Treaty and First Peoples	
Enver Erdogan, MLC	Minister for Corrections; Minister for Youth Justice (Victoria); Minister for Victim Support	
Natalie Suleyman, MP	Minister for Veterans; Minister for Small Business; Minister for Youth	

=== Parliamentary Secretaries ===
Minister	Portfolio	Image
Nick Staikos, MP	Parliamentary Secretary to the Premier	
Josh Bull, MP	Parliamentary Secretary for Level Crossing Removals; Parliamentary Secretary for Transport	
Darren Cheeseman, MP	Parliamentary Secretary for the Commonwealth Games	
Christine Couzens, MP	Parliamentary Secretary for First Peoples	
Paul Edbrooke, MP	Parliamentary Secretary to the Treasurer	
Bronwyn Halfpenny, MP	Parliamentary Secretary for Jobs	
Katie Hall, MP	Parliamentary Secretary for Creative Industries; Parliamentary Secretary for Early Childhood	
Nathan Lambert, MP	Parliamentary Secretary for Multicultural Affairs	
Tim Richardson, MP	Parliamentary Secretary for Health Infrastructure; Parliamentary Secretary for Mental Health and Suicide Prevention	
Michaela Settle, MP	Parliamentary Secretary for Regional Development; Parliamentary Secretary for Agriculture	
Nina Taylor, MP	Parliamentary Secretary for Training and Skills	
Kat Theophanous, MP	Parliamentary Secretary for Women's Health	
Vicki Ward, MP	Parliamentary Secretary for Education	
Sheena Watt, MLC	Parliamentary Secretary for Housing; Parliamentary Secretary for Volunteers	

== See also ==
- Opposition Shadow ministry of John Pesutto (2022-2023)

Parliament of Victoria
Preceded by Second Andrews ministry	Third Andrews ministry 2022–2023	Succeeded by Allan ministry
