= Jacinta Allan ministry =

72nd ministry of Victoria, Australia

Allan ministry
- 72nd ministry of Victoria, Australia
- Date formed: 27 September 2023
- Date dissolved: 28 July 2026

People and organisations
- Monarch: Charles III
- Governor: Margaret Gardner
- Premier: Jacinta Allan
- Deputy premier: Ben Carroll
- No. of ministers: 22
- Member party: Labor
- Status in legislature: Majority government
- Opposition cabinet: Pesutto Shadow Cabinet (until December 2024); Battin Shadow Cabinet (Until November 2025) Jess Wilson (from November 2025)
- Opposition party: Liberal–National Coalition
- Opposition leader: John Pesutto (Liberal) (until December 2024); Brad Battin (Liberal) (until November 2025); Jess Wilson (Liberal) (from November 2025)

History
- Predecessor: Third Andrews ministry
- Successor: Carroll ministry

The Allan ministry was the 72nd ministry of the Government of Victoria. The Labor government, led by Premier Jacinta Allan and Deputy Premier Ben Carroll, was officially sworn in following the resignation of Daniel Andrews and dissolution of the Third Andrews ministry.

On 27 September 2023, only Allan was sworn in as Premier.

The full ministry was sworn in on 2 October 2023. At this time, the ministry consisted of 22 ministers, fifteen of whom are women.

The cabinet was dissolved upon Allan's resignation on 28 July 2026 and Carroll's election as Premier on the same day

== Background ==
The formation of the ministry can be traced back to the aftermath of the 2023 Victorian Labor Party leadership election, during which Jacinta Allan emerged as the uncontested leader of the party and subsequently ascended to the position of Premier of Victoria. Allan's ascent to leadership resulted from intricate negotiations between the factions within the party, namely the Labor Right and Labor Left, who had reached an impasse concerning the deputy leadership. Initially, the left faction had endorsed Treasurer of Victoria Tim Pallas as their preferred candidate, while the right faction had intended to nominate Ben Carroll for the leadership, with Anthony Carbines as his deputy.

However, these factional disagreements ultimately gave way to a consensus, leading to Ben Carroll being elected unopposed as the deputy, thereby averting the need for an extended rank-and-file election.

== Composition ==
=== Current Composition (April to July 2026) ===
The reshuffle was triggered by the retirement of former Minister for Women Natalie Hutchins, former Health Minister Mary-Anne Thomas, former Finance Minister Danny Pearson and former Water Minister Gayle Tierney's announcements that they would not contest the state election in November and subsequent resignation from the Ministry.

Ministers
| Portrait | Minister | Portfolio | Took office | Duration of tenure | Electorate |
|---|---|---|---|---|---|
| | Jacinta Allan | Premier | 27 September 2023 | 3 years, 54 days | Bendigo East |
| | Ben Carroll | Deputy Premier; Minister for Education; Minister for WorkSafe and TAC; Minister for Medical Research | 2 October 2023 | 3 years, 49 days | Niddrie |
| | Jaclyn Symes | Leader of the Government in the Legislative Council; Treasurer; Minister for Industrial Relations; Minister for Development Victoria and Precincts | 22 December 2020 | 5 years, 333 days | MLC for Northern Victoria Region |
| | Lizzie Blandthorn | Deputy Leader of the Government in the Legislative Council; Minister for Children; Minister for Disability | 2 October 2023 | 3 years, 49 days | MLC for Western Metropolitan Region |
| | Colin Brooks | Minister for Industry and Advanced Manufacturing; Minister for Defence Industry; Minister for Skills and TAFE | 2 October 2023 | 3 years, 49 days | Bundoora |
| | Anthony Carbines | Leader of the House; Minister for Police; Minister for Community Safety; Minister for Victims; Minister for Racing | 27 June 2022 | 4 years, 146 days | Ivanhoe |
| | Lily D'Ambrosio | Minister for Climate Action; Minister for Energy and Resources; Minister for the State Electricity Commission | 4 December 2014 | 11 years, 351 days | Mill Park |
| | Steve Dimopoulos | Minister for Economic Growth and Jobs; Minister for Tourism, Sport and Major Events | 27 June 2022 | 4 years, 146 days | Oakleigh |
| | Enver Erdogan | Minister for Environment; Minister for Outdoor Recreation; Minister for Casino, Gaming and Liquor Regulation | 5 December 2022 | 3 years, 350 days | MLC for Southern Metropolitan Region |
| | Melissa Horne | Minister for Ports and Freight; Minister for Health Infrastructure; Minister for Prevention of Family Violence | 29 November 2018 | 7 years, 356 days | Williamstown |
| | Paul Hamer | Minister for Local Government; Minister for Youth Justice; Minister for Corrections | 15 April 2026 | 219 days | Box Hill |
| | Luba Grigorovitch | Minister for Carers and Volunteers; Minister for Youth | 15 April 2026 | 219 days | Kororoit |
| | Sonya Kilkenny | Attorney-General; Minister for Planning; Minister for Violence Reduction; Minister for Finance | 4 July 2022 | 4 years, 139 days | Carrum |
| | Harriet Shing | Minister for Health; Minister for Ambulance Services; Minister for Water | 27 June 2022 | 4 years, 146 days | MLC for Eastern Victoria Region |
| | Ros Spence | Minister for Roads and Road Safety; Minister for First Peoples; Minister for Community Sport | 23 March 2020 | 6 years, 242 days | Kalkallo |
| | Ingrid Stitt | Special Minister of State; Minister for Government Services; Minister for Mental Health; Minister for Ageing; Minister for Multicultural and Multifaith Victoria | 29 September 2020 | 6 years, 52 days | MLC for Western Metropolitan Region |
| | Natalie Suleyman | Minister for Tourism; Minister for Small and Family Business; Minister for Employment; Minister for Veterans | 5 December 2022 | 3 years, 350 days | St Albans |
| | Vicki Ward | Minister for Emergency Services; Minister for Natural Disaster Recovery; Minister for Equality; Minister for Creative Industries | 2 October 2023 | 3 years, 49 days | Eltham |
| | Gabrielle Williams | Minister for Transport Infrastructure; Minister for Public and Active Transport; Minister for Women and Girls | 29 November 2018 | 7 years, 356 days | Dandenong |
| | Nick Staikos | Minister for Housing and Building; Minister for the Suburban Rail Loop | 19 December 2024 | 1 year, 336 days | Bentleigh |
| | Paul Edbrooke | Minister for Cost of Living; Minister for Renters; Minister for Men and Boys; Minister for Consumer Affairs | 15 April 2026 | 219 days | Frankston |
| | Michaela Settle | Minister for Regional Development; Minister for Agriculture | 15 April 2026 | 219 days | Eureka |

=== Composition (December 2024 to December 2025) ===
Ministers
| Portrait | Minister | Portfolio | Took office | Duration of tenure | Electorate |
|---|---|---|---|---|---|
| | Jacinta Allan | Premier | 27 September 2023 | 3 years, 54 days | Bendigo East |
| | Ben Carroll | Deputy Premier; Minister for Education; Minister for WorkSafe and the TAC | 2 October 2023 | 3 years, 49 days | Niddrie |
| | Jaclyn Symes | Leader of the Government in the Legislative Council; Treasurer; Minister for Regional Development | 22 December 2020 | 5 years, 333 days | MLC for Northern Victoria Region |
| | Lizzie Blandthorn | Deputy Leader of the Government in the Legislative Council; Minister for Children; Minister for Disability | 2 October 2023 | 3 years, 49 days | MLC for Western Metropolitan Region |
| | Colin Brooks | Minister for Industry and Advanced Manufacturing; Minister for Creative Industries | 2 October 2023 | 3 years, 49 days | Bundoora |
| | Anthony Carbines | Minister for Police; Minister for Community Safety; Minister for Victims; Minister for Racing | 27 June 2022 | 4 years, 146 days | Ivanhoe |
| | Lily D'Ambrosio | Minister for Climate Action; Minister for Energy and Resources; Minister for the State Electricity Commission | 4 December 2014 | 11 years, 351 days | Mill Park |
| | Steve Dimopoulos | Minister for the Environment; Minister for Tourism, Sport and Major Events; Minister for Outdoor Recreation | 27 June 2022 | 4 years, 146 days | Oakleigh |
| | Enver Erdogan | Minister for Casino, Gaming and Liquor Regulation; Minister for Corrections; Minister for Youth Justice | 5 December 2022 | 3 years, 350 days | MLC for Southern Metropolitan Region |
| | Melissa Horne | Minister for Health Infrastructure; Minister for Ports and Freight; Minister for Roads and Road Safety | 29 November 2018 | 7 years, 356 days | Williamstown |
| | Natalie Hutchins | Minister for Government Services; Minister for Treaty and First Peoples; Minister for Prevention of Family Violence; Minister for Women | 4 December 2014 | 11 years, 351 days | Sydenham |
| | Sonya Kilkenny | Attorney-General; Minister for Planning | 4 July 2022 | 4 years, 139 days | Carrum |
| | Danny Pearson | Minister for Economic Growth and Jobs; Minister for Finance | 22 June 2020 | 6 years, 151 days | Essendon |
| | Harriet Shing | Minister for the Suburban Rail Loop; Minister for Housing and Building; Minister for Development Victoria and Precincts | 27 June 2022 | 4 years, 146 days | MLC for Eastern Victoria Region |
| | Ros Spence | Minister for Agriculture; Minister for Community Sport; Minister for Carers and Volunteers | 23 March 2020 | 6 years, 242 days | Kalkallo |
| | Nick Staikos | Minister for Consumer Affairs; Minister for Local Government | 19 December 2024 | 1 year, 336 days | Bentleigh |
| | Ingrid Stitt | Minister for Mental Health; Minister for Ageing; Minister for Multicultural Affairs | 29 September 2020 | 6 years, 52 days | MLC for Western Metropolitan Region |
| | Natalie Suleyman | Minister for Veterans; Minister for Small Business and Employment; Minister for Youth | 5 December 2022 | 3 years, 350 days | St Albans |
| | Mary-Anne Thomas | Leader of the House; Minister for Health; Minister for Ambulance services | 5 December 2022 | 3 years, 350 days | Macdeon |
| | Gayle Tierney | Minister for Skills and TAFE; Minister for Water | 9 November 2016 | 10 years, 11 days | MLC for Western Victoria Region |
| | Vicki Ward | Minister for Emergency Services; Minister for Natural Disaster Recovery; Minister for Equality | 2 October 2023 | 3 years, 49 days | Eltham |
| | Gabrielle Williams | Minister for Transport Infrastructure; Minister for Public and Active Transport | 29 November 2018 | 7 years, 356 days | Dandenong |

=== Composition (September 2023–December 2024) ===
Ministers
| Minister | Portfolio | Took office | Duration of tenure | Electorate |
|---|---|---|---|---|
| Jacinta Allan | Premier | 27 September 2023 | 3 years, 54 days | Bendigo East |
| Ben Carroll | Deputy Premier; Minister for Education; Minister for Medical Research | 2 October 2023 | 3 years, 49 days | Niddrie |
| Jaclyn Symes | Leader of the Government in the Legislative Council; Attorney-General; Minister for Emergency Services | 22 December 2020 | 5 years, 333 days | MLC for Northern Victoria Region |
| Tim Pallas | Treasurer; Minister for Industrial Relations; Minister for Economic Growth | 4 December 2014 | 11 years, 351 days | Werribee |
| Lizzie Blandthorn | Deputy Leader of the Government in the Legislative Council; Minister for Children; Minister for Disability | 2 October 2023 | 3 years, 49 days | MLC for Western Metropolitan Region |
| Colin Brooks | Minister for Development Victoria; Minister for Precincts; Minister for Creative Industries | 2 October 2023 | 3 years, 49 days | Bundoora |
| Anthony Carbines | Minister for Police; Minister for Crime Prevention; Minister for Racing | 27 June 2022 | 4 years, 146 days | Ivanhoe |
| Lily D'Ambrosio | Minister for Climate Action; Minister for Energy and Resources; Minister for the State Electricity Commission | 4 December 2014 | 11 years, 351 days | Mill Park |
| Steve Dimopoulos | Minister for the Environment; Minister for Tourism, Sport and Major Events; Minister for Outdoor Recreation | 27 June 2022 | 4 years, 146 days | Oakleigh |
| Enver Erdogan | Minister for Corrections; Minister for Youth Justice; Minister for Victim Support | 5 December 2022 | 3 years, 350 days | MLC for Southern Metropolitan Region |
| Melissa Horne | Minister for Casino, Gaming and Liquor Regulation; Minister for Local Government; Minister for Ports and Freight; Minister for Roads and Road Safety | 29 November 2018 | 7 years, 356 days | Williamstown |
| Natalie Hutchins | Minister for Jobs and Industry; Minister for Treaty and First Peoples; Minister for Women | 4 December 2014 | 11 years, 351 days | Sydenham |
| Sonya Kilkenny | Minister for Planning; Minister for the Suburbs | 4 July 2022 | 4 years, 139 days | Carrum |
| Danny Pearson | Minister for Transport Infrastructure; Minister for the Suburban Rail Loop; Assistant Treasurer; Minister for WorkSafe and the TAC | 22 June 2020 | 6 years, 151 days | Essendon |
| Harriet Shing | Minister for Housing; Minister for Water; Minister for Equality | 27 June 2022 | 4 years, 146 days | MLC for Eastern Victoria Region |
| Ros Spence | Minister for Agriculture; Minister for Community Sport; Minister for Carers and Volunteers | 23 March 2020 | 6 years, 242 days | Kalkallo |
| Ingrid Stitt | Minister for Mental Health; Minister for Ageing; Minister for Multicultural Affairs | 29 September 2020 | 6 years, 52 days | MLC for Western Metropolitan Region |
| Natalie Suleyman | Minister for Veterans; Minister for Small Business; Minister for Youth | 5 December 2022 | 3 years, 350 days | St Albans |
| Mary-Anne Thomas | Leader of the House; Minister for Health; Minister for Health Infrastructure | 5 December 2022 | 3 years, 350 days | Macdeon |
| Gayle Tierney | Minister for Skills and TAFE; Minister for Regional Development | 9 November 2016 | 10 years, 11 days | MLC for Western Victoria Region |
| Vicki Ward | Minister for Prevention of Family Violence; Minister for Employment | 2 October 2023 | 3 years, 49 days | Eltham |
| Gabrielle Williams | Minister for Government Services; Minister for Consumer Affairs; Minister for Public and Active Transport | 29 November 2018 | 7 years, 356 days | Dandenong |

=== Interim composition ===
When Allan was sworn in on 27 September 2023, ministerial portfolios of the Third Andrews ministry have been retained in the interim until 2 October 2023, when the full ministry was sworn in.

| Minister | Portfolio |
|---|---|
| Jacinta Allan, MP | Premier; Minister for Transport and Infrastructure; Minister for the Suburban Rail Loop |
| Ben Carroll, MP | Minister for Industry and Innovation; Minister for Manufacturing Sovereignty; Minister for Employment; Minister for Public Transport |
| Jaclyn Symes, MLC | Leader of the Government in the Legislative Council; Attorney-General; Minister for Emergency Services |
| Gayle Tierney, MLC | Minister for Training and Skills; Minister for Higher Education; Minister for Agriculture |
| Tim Pallas, MP | Treasurer; Minister for Industrial Relations; Minister for Trade and Investment |
| Lizzie Blandthorn, MLC | Deputy Leader of the Government in the Legislative Council; Minister for Disability, Ageing and Carers; Minister for Child Protection and Family Services |
| Colin Brooks, MP | Minister for Housing; Minister for Multicultural Affairs |
| Anthony Carbines, MP | Minister for Police; Minister for Crime Prevention; Minister for Racing |
| Lily D'Ambrosio, MP | Minister for Climate Action; Minister for Energy and Resources; Minister for the State Electricity Commission |
| Steve Dimopoulos, MP | Minister for Tourism, Sport and Major Events; Minister for Creative Industries |
| Melissa Horne, MP | Minister for Casino, Gaming and Liquor Regulation; Minister for Local Government; Minister for Ports and Freight; Minister for Roads and Road Safety |
| Natalie Hutchins, MP | Minister for Education; Minister for Women |
| Sonya Kilkenny, MP | Minister for Planning; Minister for Outdoor Recreation |
| Danny Pearson, MP | Minister for Government Services; Assistant Treasurer; Minister for WorkSafe and the TAC; Minister for Consumer Affairs |
| Harriet Shing, MLC | Minister for Water; Minister for Regional Development; Minister for Equality; Minister for Commonwealth Games Legacy |
| Ros Spence, MP | Minister for Prevention of Family Violence; Minister for Community Sport; Minister for Suburban Development |
| Ingrid Stitt, MLC | Minister for Early Childhood and Pre-Prep; Minister for the Environment |
| Mary-Anne Thomas, MP | Leader of the House; Minister for Health; Minister for Health Infrastructure; Minister for Medical Research |
| Gabrielle Williams, MP | Minister for Mental Health; Minister for Ambulance Services; Minister for Treaty and First Peoples |
| Enver Erdogan, MLC | Minister for Corrections; Minister for Youth Justice; Minister for Victim Support |
| Natalie Suleyman, MP | Minister for Veterans; Minister for Small Business; Minister for Youth |

== Parliamentary secretaries ==
Parliamentary Secretaries
| Portrait | Parliamentary Secretary | Portfolio | Took office | Duration of tenure | Electorate |
|---|---|---|---|---|---|
| | Tim Richardson | Parliamentary Secretary to the Premier; Parliamentary Secretary for Men's Behaviour Changes | 2 October 2023 | 3 years, 49 days | Mordialloc |
| | Josh Bull | Parliamentary Secretary for Level Crossing Removals; Parliamentary Secretary for Transport | 2 October 2023 | 3 years, 49 days | Sunbury |
| | Christine Couzens | Parliamentary Secretary for First Peoples | 2 October 2023 | 3 years, 49 days | Geelong |
| | Paul Edbrooke | Parliamentary Secretary to the Treasurer; Parliamentary Secretary for Mental Health and Suicide Prevention | 2 October 2023 | 3 years, 49 days | Frankston |
| | Luba Grigorovitch | Parliamentary Secretary for Outdoor Recreation | 19 December 2024 | 1 year, 336 days | Kororoit |
| | Bronwyn Halfpenny | Parliamentary Secretary for Roads | 2 October 2023 | 3 years, 49 days | Thomastown |
| | Katie Hall | Parliamentary Secretary for Homes; Parliamentary Secretary for Creative Industries | 2 October 2023 | 3 years, 49 days | Footscray |
| | Nathan Lambert | Parliamentary Secretary for Children | 2 October 2023 | 3 years, 49 days | Preston |
| | Michaela Settle | Parliamentary Secretary for Regional Victoria; Parliamentary Secretary for Community Sport | 2 October 2023 | 3 years, 49 days | Eureka |
| | Nina Taylor | Parliamentary Secretary for Education | 2 October 2023 | 3 years, 49 days | Albert Park |
| | Paul Hamer | Parliamentary Secretary for Jobs | 19 December 2024 | 1 year, 336 days | Box Hill |
| | Kat Theophanous | Parliamentary Secretary for Women's Health; Parliamentary Secretary for Renters | 2 October 2023 | 3 years, 49 days | Northcote |
| | Sheena Watt | Parliament Secretary for Climate Action; Parliament Secretary for Emergency Services | 2 October 2023 | 3 years, 49 days | MLC for Northern Metropolitan Region |
| | Iwan Walters | Parliamentary Secretary for Multicultural Affairs | 19 December 2024 | 1 year, 336 days | Greenvale |

== See also ==
- Opposition Shadow ministry of John Pesutto (2023-2024)
- Opposition Shadow Ministry of Brad Battin (since 2024)

Parliament of Victoria
| Preceded by Third Andrews ministry | Allan ministry 2023–2026 | Succeeded by Carroll ministry |
