= Carroll ministry =

73rd ministry of Victoria, Australia

- 73rd ministry of Victoria, Australia
- Date formed: 28 July 2026

People and organisations
- Monarch: Charles III
- Governor: Margaret Gardner
- Premier: Ben Carroll
- Deputy premier: Gabrielle Williams
- No. of ministers: 20
- Member party: Labor
- Status in legislature: Majority government
- Opposition cabinet: Wilson Shadow Cabinet
- Opposition party: Liberal–National Coalition
- Opposition leader: Jess Wilson (Liberal)

History
- Predecessor: Allan ministry

The Carroll ministry is the 73rd ministry of the Government of Victoria. The Labor government is led by Premier Ben Carroll, with Gabrielle Williams serving as Deputy Premier.

Carroll and Williams were sworn in as premier and deputy premier respectively on 28 July 2026, following the resignation of Jacinta Allan. Carroll became Victoria's 50th premier.

== Background ==
On 27 July 2026, a delegation of Labor ministers and members of parliament met with Allan and informed her that she had lost the support of a majority of the parliamentary caucus. Carroll, who had served as deputy premier since September 2023, subsequently announced that he would nominate for the leadership of the Victorian Labor Party.

Allan initially stated that she would contest a leadership ballot. On the morning of 28 July, however, she announced her resignation as Labor leader and premier, saying that an extended ballot involving party members would consume valuable time and resources ahead of the 2026 Victorian state election.

Attorney-General Sonya Kilkenny nominated for the leadership during the subsequent caucus meeting. Williams was elected deputy leader and briefly appointed interim Labor leader while the leadership contest remained unresolved. Kilkenny later withdrew her nomination, allowing Carroll to be elected leader without a party membership ballot.

Carroll and Williams were sworn in at Government House later that day. The ceremony was conducted by Lieutenant-Governor James Angus in the absence of Governor Margaret Gardner.

== Ministry ==
=== Current composition ===
As of 4 August 2026, the ministry consists of 20 ministers, with Nina Taylor also attending Cabinet in her capacity as Cabinet Secretary.

Portrait	Minister	Portfolio	Took office (Note: The primary date shown reflects the commencement of the minister's most recently assumed current office or portfolio. Where a minister has served continuously in Cabinet since an earlier date, that date is shown beneath.)	Duration of tenure	Electorate
	Ben Carroll MP	Premier	28 July 2026; Cabinet since 16 October 2017	115 days; Cabinet: 9 years, 35 days	Niddrie
	Gabrielle Williams MP	Deputy Premier; Minister for Education; Minister for Skills and Training; Minister for First Peoples; Minister for Women and Gender Equality	4 August 2026; Cabinet since 19 December 2018	108 days; Cabinet: 7 years, 336 days	Dandenong
	Jaclyn Symes MLC	Leader of the Government in the Legislative Council; Minister for Energy and Resources; Minister for Climate Action; Minister for Environment; Minister for State Electricity Commission	4 August 2026; Cabinet since 19 December 2018	108 days; Cabinet: 7 years, 336 days	Northern Victoria Region
	Lizzie Blandthorn MLC	Deputy Leader of the Government in the Legislative Council; Minister for Children; Minister for Disability	5 December 2022; Cabinet since 27 June 2022	3 years, 350 days; Cabinet: 4 years, 146 days	Western Metropolitan Region
	Colin Brooks MP	Treasurer; Minister for Industrial Relations	4 August 2026; Cabinet since 27 June 2022	108 days; Cabinet: 4 years, 146 days	Bundoora
	Anthony Carbines MP	Leader of the House; Minister for Artificial Intelligence and Digital Economy; Minister for Major Events; Minister for Medical Research; Minister for Racing; Minister for Economic Development	4 August 2026; Cabinet since 6 December 2021	108 days; Cabinet: 4 years, 349 days	Ivanhoe
	Steve Dimopoulos MP	Minister for Sport; Minister for WorkSafe and TAC; Minister for Equality	4 August 2026; Cabinet since 27 June 2022	108 days; Cabinet: 4 years, 146 days	Oakleigh
	Paul Edbrooke MP	Minister for Police; Minister for Emergency Services; Minister for Multicultural Affairs; Minister for Crime Prevention	4 August 2026; Cabinet since 15 April 2026	108 days; Cabinet: 219 days	Frankston
	Enver Erdogan MLC	Minister for Finance; Minister for Government Services; Minister for Casino, Gaming and Liquor Regulation	4 August 2026; Cabinet since 5 December 2022	108 days; Cabinet: 3 years, 350 days	Northern Metropolitan Region
	Luba Grigorovitch MP	Minister for Youth; Minister for Carers and Volunteers	15 April 2026	219 days	Kororoit
	Paul Hamer MP	Minister for Roads and Road Safety	4 August 2026; Cabinet since 15 April 2026	108 days; Cabinet: 219 days	Box Hill
	Melissa Horne MP	Minister for Ports and Freight; Minister for Jobs; Minister for Industry and Advanced Manufacturing; Minister for Defence Industry	4 August 2026; Cabinet since 19 December 2018	108 days; Cabinet: 7 years, 336 days	Williamstown
	Sonya Kilkenny MP	Attorney-General; Minister for Planning; Minister for Prevention of Family Violence	4 August 2026; Cabinet since 4 July 2022	108 days; Cabinet: 4 years, 139 days	Carrum
	Tim Richardson MP	Minister for Local Government; Minister for Consumer Affairs; Minister for Renters	4 August 2026	108 days	Mordialloc
	Michaela Settle MP	Minister for Rural and Regional Development; Minister for Agriculture; Minister for Water	4 August 2026; Cabinet since 15 April 2026	108 days; Cabinet: 219 days	Eureka
	Ros Spence MP	Minister for Youth Justice; Minister for Corrections; Minister for Victims Support; Minister for Community Sport	4 August 2026; Cabinet since 23 March 2020	108 days; Cabinet: 6 years, 242 days	Kalkallo
	Nick Staikos MP	Minister for Housing, Building and Precincts; Minister for Homelessness; Minister for Seniors	4 August 2026; Cabinet since 19 December 2024	108 days; Cabinet: 1 year, 336 days	Bentleigh
	Ingrid Stitt MLC	Minister for Health; Minister for Mental Health; Minister for Ambulance Services; Special Minister of State	4 August 2026; Cabinet since 29 September 2020	108 days; Cabinet: 6 years, 52 days	Western Metropolitan Region
	Natalie Suleyman MP	Minister for Small and Family Business; Minister for Trade, Tourism and Investment; Minister for Veterans	4 August 2026; Cabinet since 5 December 2022	108 days; Cabinet: 3 years, 350 days	St Albans
	Vicki Ward MP	Minister for Public Transport; Minister for Creative Industries	4 August 2026; Cabinet since 2 October 2023	108 days; Cabinet: 3 years, 49 days	Eltham
Also attending Cabinet
	Nina Taylor MP	Cabinet Secretary	4 August 2026	108 days	Albert Park

== See also ==
- Premiership of Ben Carroll
- Allan ministry
- Shadow ministry of Jess Wilson
- 2026 Victorian Labor Party leadership election

== Notes ==
Parliament of Victoria
Preceded by Allan ministry	Carroll ministry 2026–present	Incumbent
