= Premiership of Ben Carroll =

Government of Victoria since 2026

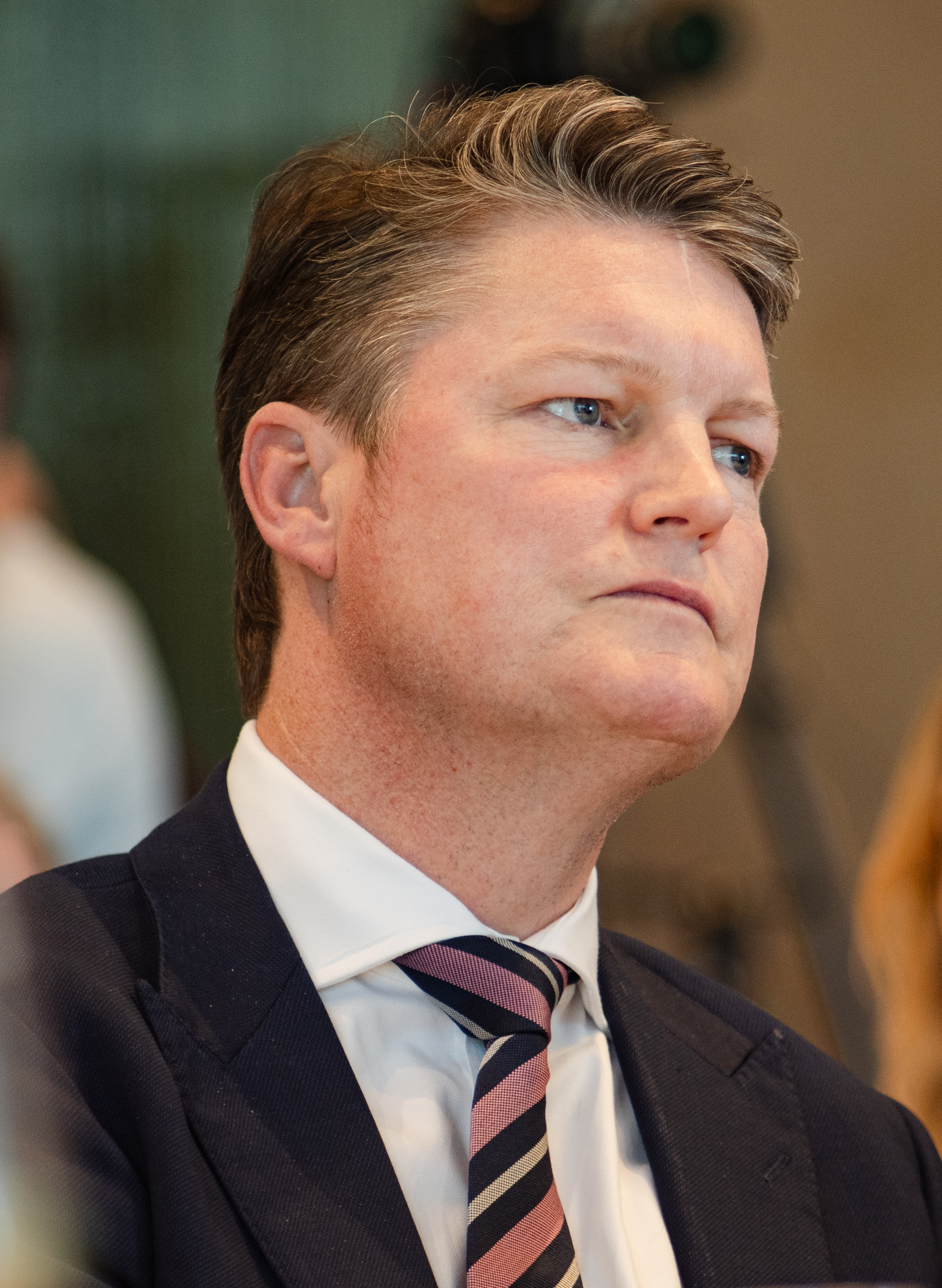
- Premiership of Ben Carroll; 28 July 2026 – present
- Governor: Margaret Gardner
- Cabinet: Carroll
- Party: Labor
- Election: 2026
- Appointed by: Governor Margaret Gardner
- Seat: 1 Treasury Place
- Victoria

The premiership of Ben Carroll has been the state-level executive government of the Australian state of Victoria since 28 July 2026. Carroll, a member of the Victorian Labor Party, was appointed by the Lieutenant Governor James Angus in absence of Governor Margaret Gardner as premier of Victoria following the 2026 Victorian Labor Party leadership election and the resignation of his predecessor Jacinta Allan.

A centrist member of Labor's Right faction, Carroll has acted to differentiate himself from his Left predecessors Jacinta Allan and Daniel Andrews. Since becoming premier, Carroll has reversed the position of the Allan government by announcing the creation of a Royal commission into the construction industry following allegations of corruption and violence in relation to Victoria's Big Build program.

Carroll is expected to lead Victorian Labor's ticket in the 2026 Victorian state election, alongside his deputy premier Gabrielle Williams.

== Electoral history ==
=== Party ===
On 27 July 2026, Carroll, then deputy premier, was approached by a delegation of Labor members who sought for him to nominate in a leadership election against Jacinta Allan. In a leadership spill the following day, Carroll was elected unopposed as Labor leader and ex officio premier after his only opponent Sonya Kilkenny dropped out of the election. He was appointed as premier of Victoria later that day, with Gabrielle Williams as deputy premier.

=== State ===
Carroll will lead Victorian Labor into the 2026 state election in an attempt to win the party a fourth consecutive four-year term of government.

== State affairs ==
=== Royal Commission into the Construction Sector ===
On 28 July 2026, Carroll announced that:

- A royal commission into the construction sector would be held;
- A special prosecutor would be appointed to work in parallel with the royal commission; and
- The Independent Broad-based Anti-corruption Commission would be given 'follow the money powers'.

=== Employment ===
Carroll has stated he intends to consult further with the business community and make amendments to a bill supported by his predecessor Jacinta Allan that would guarantee Victorian employees the right to work 2 days a week from home.

=== Transport ===
Carroll has indicated his intention to have cabinet further scrutinise the Suburban Rail Loop.

== Appointments ==
=== Cabinet ===
On 4 August 2026, the cabinet was unveiled. A ministry for Artificial Intelligence and Digital Economy was created, led by Anthony Carbines. The new ministry removed the ministries of Transport Infrastructure and the ministry of the Suburban Rail Loop.
