= Allan ministry =

Allan ministry may refer to

- the John Allan ministry, the government of Victoria, Australia, from 1924 to 1927, or
- the Jacinta Allan ministry, the current government of Victoria, Australia, since 2023.
