= Minister for Equality =

Minister for Equality may refer to:

- Minister for Equality (Victoria), Australia
- Minister for Women and Equalities, UK parliament
