= Ro Allen =

Australian LGBTIQ advocate

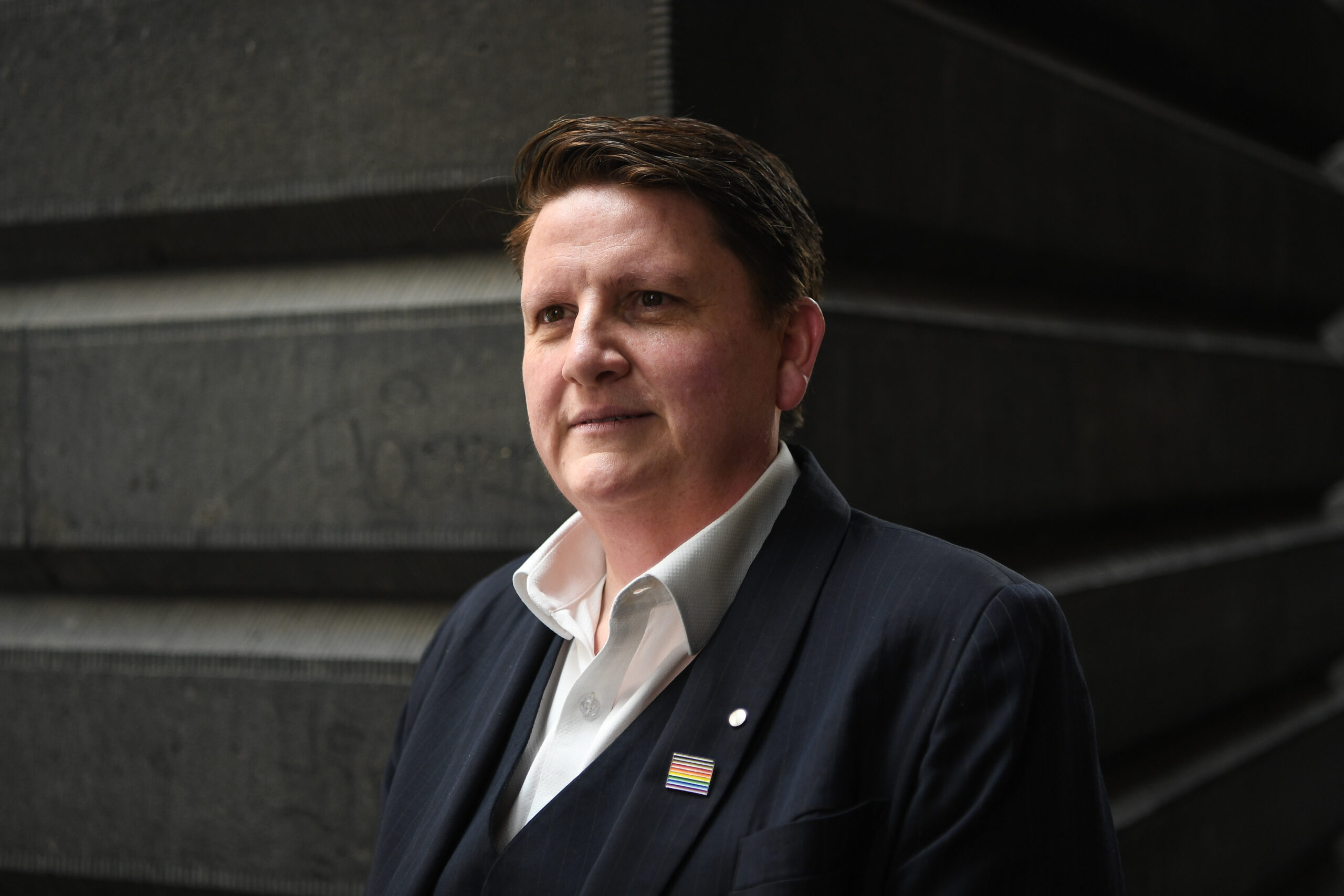
- Allen in 2019

Commissioner for LGBTIQ+ Communities
- In office July 2015 – September 2021

Ro Allen is an Australian LGBTIQ advocate and, since 2021, the Victorian Equal Opportunity and Human Rights Commissioner. In 2015, Allen was the first person appointed to the position of Commissioner for LGBTIQ+ Communities (formerly the Victorian Gender and Sexuality Commissioner) in the state of Victoria.

== Career ==
Prior to their appointment as Victoria's gender and sexuality commissioner, Allen held executive positions with numerous organisations, including chairperson of the Victorian Adult, Community and Further Education Board, commissioner of the Victorian Skills Commission, commissioner of the Youth Affairs Council of Victoria, deputy chairperson of the Hume Regional Development Australia Committee, chairperson of Communities for Children in Shepparton, and chairperson of the National Working Party for GLBTI Social Reform in the early 2010s. Allen was also the founding chief executive officer of UnitingCare Australia's Cutting Edge community services agency in the Goulburn Valley.

== Gender and Sexuality Commissioner ==
Victoria was the first Australian state to establish an Equality portfolio and a commissioner for gender and sexuality within this department. The establishment of these positions are among a number of high-profile initiatives by the Andrews government to improve the visibility and inclusion of LGBTIQ+ Victorians. The position of Gender and Sexuality Commissioner was renamed to the Commissioner for LGBTIQ+ Communities during Allen's tenure. Allen was announced as the Commissioner in July 2015 by then Minister for Equality, Martin Foley.

Following Allen's appointment in 2015, they held various events in regional Victorian communities to promote the inclusion and reduce the discrimination of LGBTIQ people in non-metropolitan areas.

Allen is credited with helping coordinate the first Australian Football League-sanctioned Pride Game, which occurred in Round 21 of the 2016 AFL season. They also hosted the first national retreat for trans and gender diverse Aboriginal people, held in November 2016. The event was held in Brunswick and incorporated workshops, celebrations and networking opportunities.

In 2017, Allen was a proponent of the "Yes" vote for the Australian Marriage Law Postal Survey. That same year, they promoted the introduction of T-screen, a joint initiative by Breast Screen Victoria and Transgender Victoria to make breast screenings for trans and gender diverse people more inclusive by educating medical staff on how to be more respectful during screenings. Todd Fernando was appointed their successor as Commissioner for LGBTIQ+ Communities in September 2021.

== Victorian Equal Opportunity and Human Rights Commissioner ==
Allen was appointed to the position of Victorian Equal Opportunity and Human Rights Commissioner in May 2021, commencing in this role in June of the same year.

== Personal life ==
Allen identifies as gender diverse. Allen has said that they are comfortable when people address them using male pronouns, as they are "very relaxed" about how people gender them.

Allen is a member of the Uniting Church. They came out at a Christian youth convention at the age of 20. While they were publicly praised their mentor for being supportive and telling them they didn't need to choose between their faith and their sexuality, Allen has criticised an earlier experience at a friend's Pentecostal Church where ministers attempted conversion therapy. Allen has described such therapy as "unbelievably dangerous".

Upon their appointment as Victoria's Gender and Sexuality Commissioner, Allen discussed past incidents of assault and occasions they have received hate mail, including an elderly woman hitting them with a handbag in a women's toilet after mistaking Allen for a man, a man assaulting them in the street, and receiving a card containing cut-out letters spelling "devil child" following the birth of their child. Allen has said such experiences have made them stronger and more determined in their work to ensure others don't have to experience such bigotry.

Allen resided in Violet Town before they moved to Melbourne in 2016. They have also lived in Shepparton and Glen Waverley. Allen and their partner took part in a public commitment ceremony at a rally calling for equal rights for gay people in Shepparton in 2014, prior to the legalisation of same-sex marriage in Australia in 2017. In October 2017, Allen attended a marriage equality rally in Melbourne to promote the "Yes" campaign for the Australian Marriage Law Postal Survey.

== Politics ==
Allen stood as the Australian Labor Party candidate in the electorate of Benalla at the 2010 Victorian election. Allen said their motivation to stand as the ALP candidate for Benalla was due to the frustration of seeing basic infrastructure and community services for the electorate being overlooked in favour of more marginal seats. After preferences, Allen was defeated by the National Party of Australia's candidate Bill Sykes who attracted 73.1% of the vote, with a 5.6% swing in his favour.

2010 Victorian state election: Benalla
Party	Candidate	Votes	%	±%
National	Bill Sykes	21,072	63.28	+21.15
Labor	Ro Allen	6,124	18.39	−6.81
Greens	Kammy Cordner Hunt	2,756	8.28	+1.18
Country Alliance	Rochelle Hunt	2,546	7.65	+7.65
Independent	Nicholas Williams	804	2.41	+2.41
Total formal votes		33,302	95.97	−0.50
Informal votes		1,398	4.03	+0.50
Turnout		34,700	93.82	+0.67
Two-party-preferred result
National	Bill Sykes	24,354	73.06	+5.55
Labor	Ro Allen	8,978	26.94	−5.55
National hold		Swing	+5.55	

== Honours ==
Allen was added to the Victorian Honour Roll of Women in 2009.
