= Minister for Climate Action =

Australian state ministry portfolio in Victoria

Minister for Climate Action of Victoria
- Victorian coat of arms

- Flag of Victoria
- Incumbent; Lily D'Ambrosio MP since 5 December 2022
- Department of Energy, Environment and Climate Action
- Style: The Honourable
- Member of: Parliament; Cabinet; Executive council
- Reports to: Premier
- Nominator: Premier
- Appointer: Governor on the recommendation of the premier
- Term length: At the governor's pleasure
- Inaugural holder: John Thwaites MP
- Formation: 5 December 2002

The Minister for Climate Action is a ministry portfolio within the Executive Council of Victoria. The position was renamed "Minister for Climate Action" in the Third Andrews ministry. The portfolio was formerly known as the "Minister for Climate Change" and was held concurrently by the Minister for the Environment.

== Ministers ==
Order	MP	Party affiliation	Ministerial title	Term start	Term end	Time in office	Notes
1	John Thwaites MP	Labor	Minister for Water, Environment and Climate Change	5 December 2002	30 July 2007	4 years, 237 days	
2	John Brumby MP	Labor	Minister for Water, Environment and Climate Change	30 July 2007	3 August 2007	4 days	
3	Gavin Jennings MLC	Labor	Minister for Environment and Climate Change	3 August 2007	2 December 2010	3 years, 121 days	
4	Ryan Smith MP	Liberal	Minister for Environment and Climate Change	2 December 2010	4 December 2014	4 years, 2 days	
5	Lisa Neville MP	Labor	Minister for Environment, Climate Change and Water	4 December 2014	23 May 2016	1 year, 171 days	
6	Lily D'Ambrosio MP	Labor	Minister for Energy, Environment and Climate Change	23 May 2016	27 June 2022	6 years, 35 days	
6	Lily D'Ambrosio MP	Labor	Minister for Environment and Climate Action	27 June 2022	5 December 2022	161 days	
6	Lily D'Ambrosio MP	Labor	Minister for Climate Action	5 December 2022	Incumbent	3 years, 276 days	
