= Robert Le Poer Trench =

Australian politician

Robert Le Poer Trench (c.1811 – 8 February 1895) was a judge and an Attorney-General of Victoria.

Trench was the third son of Ven. Charles Le Poer Trench, D.D., of Ballinasloe, County Galway, Archdeacon of Ardagh, and grandson of the first Earl of Clancarty. He entered as a student of the Middle Temple in May 1839, and was called to the Bar in June 1842. Having emigrated to Victoria, he was clerk of petty sessions at Kilmore, Victoria and afterwards at Ballarat. In 1855 he was admitted to the Victorian Bar, and quickly obtained a large practice, especially in mining cases. Though he never entered parliament he was Attorney-General in the first Graham Berry Government from August to October 1875, and in Berry's second Administration, from May 1877 to March 1878, when he was appointed a Commissioner of Land Tax, and a County Court Judge in April 1880. Mr. Trench, who was appointed Q.C. in 1878, subsequently retired on a pension.
