= Minister for Equality (Victoria) =

Australian state ministry portfolio

Minister for Equality of Victoria
- Victorian coat of arms

- Flag of Victoria
- Incumbent; Vicki Ward MP since 19 December 2024
- Style: The Honourable
- Member of: Parliament; Executive council
- Reports to: Premier
- Nominator: Premier
- Appointer: Governor on the recommendation of the premier
- Term length: At the governor's pleasure
- Inaugural holder: Martin Foley MP
- Formation: 4 December 2014

The Minister for Equality is a minister within the Executive Council of Victoria. The position is currently held by Vicki Ward, and has been since December of 2024. The Minister is charged with leading the equality portfolio, alongside the Commissioner for LGBTIQA+ Communities, and is assisted by both a Ministerial Taskforce, and the Equality Unit within the Department of Families, Fairness and Housing. The aim of the Minister and the portfolio they oversee is to "remov[e] discrimination from Victorian laws, services and society...", and to "promot[e] inclusion and celebrat[e] diversity" of LGBTIQA+ peoples. The position was created at the same time as the First Andrews ministry following the 2014 state election, with the inaugural leader being Martin Foley. It is the first position of its kind in any Australian state or territory.

== History ==
Ahead of the 2014 Victorian state election, then Opposition Leader Daniel Andrews promised to establish a Minister for LGBTI+ peoples, a Commissioner for gender and sexuality, and a Ministerial Advisory Committee.

The position of Minister for Equality was established as one of the new ministries established as a part of the First Andrews ministry on the 4th of December 2014. On the same day Martin Foley became the first person to hold the role. In July 2015, Martin Foley announced that Ro Allen would become the first Commissioner for LGBTIQ+ Communities, then the Commissioner for Gender and Sexuality.

In June 2022, Martin Foley announced his decision not to recontest his electorate of Albert Park at the 2022 Victorian State election, and to step down from his portfolio positions, including as Minister for Equality. As a result, Harriet Shing took over as Minister on the 27th of June 2022, becoming one of the two of the state's first openly queer Ministers, and the state's first openly Lesbian minister.

As a part of the December 2024 reshuffle of the Allan Ministry, the position of Minister for Equality was transferred from Harriet Shing to Vicki Ward.

== List of Ministers ==
Order	Image	Minister	Party affiliation	Ministerial title	Term start	Term end	Time in office	Premier
1		Martin Foley MP	Labor	Minister for Equality	4 December 2014	27 June 2022	7 years, 205 days	Daniel Andrews
2		Harriet Shing MLC	Labor	Minister for Equality	27 June 2022	19 December 2024	2 years, 175 days	Daniel Andrews
2		Harriet Shing MLC	Labor	Minister for Equality	27 June 2022	19 December 2024	2 years, 175 days	Jacinta Allan
3		Vicki Ward MP	Labor	Minister for Equality	19 December 2024	Incumbent	1 year, 262 days	Jacinta Allan
