= LGBTQ rights in Victoria =

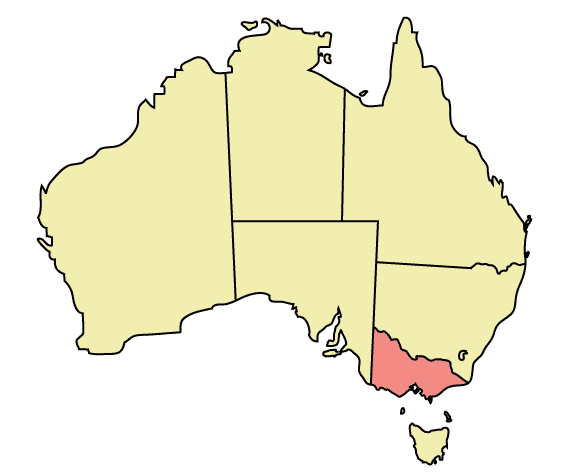
- Victoria, Australia
- Legal status: Always legal for women; Decriminalised for men in 1981; Equal age of consent since 1991
- Gender identity: By self-determination legally since 2020
- Discrimination protections: Yes (both state and federal law)

Family rights
- Recognition of relationships: Same-sex marriage legally recognised since 2017; Domestic partnership registries since 2008
- Adoption: Adoption is legal for all same-sex couples

The Australian state of Victoria is regarded as one of the country's most progressive jurisdictions with respect to the rights of lesbian, gay, bisexual, and transgender (LGBTQ) people. Victoria is the only state in Australia that has implemented a LGBTIQA+ Commissioner. In November 2025, Victoria became the first jurisdiction within Australia to allow a change of sex on a birth certificate for an individual without any fee or cost.

== Laws regarding homosexuality ==
Buggery was a crime in Victoria from 1958 until December 1980, when the Hamer Liberal government repealed the state's sodomy laws, with the death penalty being on the books for sodomy in Victoria until 1949.

The law passed 72–7, and went into effect in March 1981. The age of consent for both heterosexual and homosexual acts was set at 18, with some exceptions. However, a loosely worded "soliciting for immoral purposes" clause, inserted by dissident Liberals, saw police continue to harass homosexual men until the late 1980s.

Homosexual activism in Australia, mainly for gay men, was founded in Victoria. This is particularly prominent in Melbourne. The Melbourne-based Daughters of Bilitis (Australia), inspired by the American Daughters of Bilitis group, was Australia's first openly homosexual political organisation, although it was short-lived. It was followed by the gay rights organisation Society Five, which formed in 1971. Additional rights organisations followed, including the Homosexual Law Reform Coalition in 1975 and the Gay Teachers Group in the late 1970s, both of which were also based in Melbourne.

The Victorian LGBT community monitored events in South Australia surrounding the decriminalisation of homosexuality which took place between 1972 and 1975. In 1976, The Age reported that police had used entrapment to make mass arrests at Victoria's Black Rock Beach which angered the LGBT community and gave the issue wide public attention across Australia. Amidst the storm of protest and debate, widespread support for the decriminalisation of male homosexual acts surfaced within the political mainstream.

The general age of consent for sexual acts was lowered from 18 to 16 in 1991 by the Crimes (Sexual Offences) Act 1991.

Implemented by royal assent on and since 1 March 2022 (now an Act) – any remaining draconian legislation banning sex between consenting adults in private within Victoria were finally removed and repealed. In May 2022, the recently implemented legislation went into effect.

=== HIV transmission law repeal ===
In April 2015, the Andrews Government announced it would repeal Section 19A of the Crimes Act, a law which singled out intentional HIV transmission for harsher penalties of up to 25 years imprisonment, in contrast to the maximum penalty for manslaughter which was 20 years. As a result of the reform, intentional infection of HIV is now considered under existing criminal offences such as "causing serious injury". The Crimes Amendment (Repeal of Section 19A) Act 2015 passed the Parliament on 28 May 2015 and received royal assent on 2 June 2015, before immediately going into effect.

In April 2022, a bill passed both houses of the Parliament and the Governor of Victoria granted royal assent became an Act – that repeals all HIV legislation within Victoria on mandatory public health disease notifications, blood donations and also human tissue services. The law goes into effect from 15 February 2023, or by proclamation sooner.

=== Historical convictions expungement ===
Victoria was the first state in the nation to pass legislation creating an expungement scheme for historical homosexual sexual offences that were no longer a criminal offence. The legislation was one of the final Acts of the Napthine Government, and passed the Parliament with bipartisan support on 15 October 2014. The scheme came into effect on 1 September 2015, and since that date an individual or an appropriate representative of a deceased person can apply to expunge historical convictions for homosexual sexual activity, that is no longer a criminal offence.

Applications to expunge a conviction can be made to the Secretary of the Department of Justice & Regulation. After a conviction is expunged the individual can claim not to have been convicted or found guilty of that offence, ensuring they will not be required to disclose such information and that the conviction does not show up on a police records check. Without the law, men who were convicted have had to deal with consequences, including restrictions on travel and applying for some jobs.

Schemes of this nature now exist in all other jurisdictions of Australia.

On 24 May 2016, the Victorian Government issued a formal apology, delivered in Parliament, to the LGBT community, specifically men, who had been charged with homosexual offences in the state prior to its decriminalisation in 1981. Premier Daniel Andrews said in a speech to the Victorian Parliament:

"On behalf of the parliament, the government and the people of Victoria: for the laws we passed, and the lives we ruined, and the standards we set, we are so sorry; humbly, deeply, sorry."

Opposition leader Matthew Guy said the following:

Australia post-war was a very, very intolerant place towards gay people, particularly gay men, and today we're going to apologise for that.

== Recognition of same-sex relationships ==
=== Same-sex marriage ===
Same-sex marriage became legal in Victoria, and in the rest of Australia, in December 2017, after the Federal Parliament passed a law legalising same-sex marriage.

=== Municipal relationship registers ===
In April 2007, the City of Melbourne set up a Relationship Declaration Register for all relationships and carers, and the City of Yarra launched its Relationship Declaration Register the following month. Under the programs two people may declare that they are partners and have this declaration recorded in the Relationship Declaration Register. Though the register does not confer legal rights in the way traditional marriage does, it may be used to demonstrate the existence of a de facto relationship in relation to the Property Laws Act 1958, the Administration and Probate Act 1958 and other legislation involving domestic partnerships. Both local governments discontinued the registers in 2018, after the federal legalisation of same-sex marriage.

=== Domestic partnerships ===
Since 2008, Victoria has allowed same-sex couples to register their relationships as a domestic partnership, referred to specifically in the legislation as a "domestic relationship". The Relationships Act passed the Parliament on 10 April 2008 and received royal assent five days later. The law, introduced by the Bracks Government, allowed same-sex couples to register their relationship with the Registry of Births, Deaths and Marriages and amended 69 other pieces of legislation, ensuring equal treatment for registered relationships in most areas of Victorian law. The legislation was subject to a conscience vote in both houses of parliament; it passed the Legislative Assembly on 12 March 2008 by a vote of 54 to 24 before passing the Legislative Council by a vote of 29 to 9 on 10 April 2008. The law came into effect on 1 December 2008.

In October 2015, the Andrews Government announced it intended to make Victoria the fourth state in the nation to recognise the marriages and civil partnerships of same-sex couples performed overseas, in the state's relationships register. The government introduced the Relationships Amendment Bill to the Parliament on 6 October, before it was passed by the Legislative Assembly on 12 November 2015. The bill passed the Legislative Council on 10 December 2015, with a key amendment attached creating a provision for the register to "conduct a ceremony in connection with the registration of a relationship". The Assembly re-worded the amendment, though retained the ability for the register to conduct a ceremony in connection with a registered relationship, and the bill formally passed the Parliament on 16 February 2016. The bill received royal assent on 16 February 2016 and became the Relationships Amendment Act 2016. Portions of the law that; provided for immediate recognition of a domestic relationship for unions entered into in different jurisdictions, removed the previous 12-month living requirement for couples, and recognised de facto relationships, overseas same-sex marriages and civil unions on death certificates, went into effect on 1 July 2016. Under the commencement provisions of the legislation, the entirety of law went into effect on 1 October 2016.

=== De facto relationship recognition legislation ===
In August 2001, the Statute Law Amendment (Relationships) Act 2001 and the Statute Law Further Amendment (Relationships) Act 2001 amended 60 Acts in Victoria to give same-sex couples, called domestic partners, some rights equal to those enjoyed by de facto couples, including hospital access, medical decision making, superannuation, inheritance rights, property tax, landlord/tenancy rights, mental health treatment, and victims of crime procedures.

=== Civil union proposal ===
In March 2006, openly gay independent Victorian MP Andrew Olexander proposed a private member's bill to allow civil partnerships in the state, but the Bracks state government did not support it and did not allow it to be drafted by the parliamentary counsel.

== Adoption and parenting rights ==
=== Adoption ===
Victorian law has allowed same-sex adoption since 1 September 2016. In May 2014, the state conference of the Victorian Labor Party unanimously approved a change in the party's platform, in support of full adoption rights for same-sex couples. After Labor won government at the November 2014 state election, the newly appointed Equality Minister Martin Foley promised to amend the Adoption Act 1984 to allow for adoptions by same-sex couples. Foley said Labor would also tackle other inequalities, including the inability of a step-parent to adopt their partner's child and the inability of a gay couple to jointly adopt a child conceived through IVF. A review of Victoria's adoption laws, commissioned by former chief parliamentary counsel Eamonn Moran QC, handed a final report to the Minister on 8 May 2015.

A bill to give same-sex couples adoption rights was introduced to Parliament on 6 October 2015. The bill, subject to a conscience vote for the Liberal/ National opposition, was passed by the Legislative Assembly by 54 votes to 26, with 7 abstentions. No Liberal MP voted in favour of the bill, however six of the eight National MPs supported the legislation. The bill proceeded to the Legislative Council. On 12 November 2018, the Council passed the bill by a margin of 31 to 8. Despite passage, the government failed to attract sufficient support for a clause in the bill which prevented faith-based organisations from being able to refuse adoption orders for same-sex couples, as conservative Liberal/National and minor party councillors voted against it. Only one adoption agency (Catholic Care Victoria) had reportedly threatened to cease providing adoption services if it was compelled to assist adoptions to same-sex couples. The amended bill returned to the Legislative Assembly on 9 December 2015, where it was promptly passed. The bill received royal assent on 15 December 2015 and came into effect on 1 September 2016.

Prior to that reform, same-sex couples could only be appointed as foster parents or guardians in Victoria, and they did not have the right to adopt a child together, even if that child had been in their care for years. In response to a 2007 Victorian Law Reform Commission report into assisted reproduction, surrogacy and adoption, the Brumby Government stopped short of granting same-sex couples full adoption rights.

A Supreme Court of Victoria decision in 2010 concerning the Charter of Human Rights and Responsibilities Act 2006 granted individual gay men and lesbian women some adoption rights by concluding that the state's Adoption Act 1984 "permits one person in a same-sex couple to adopt", opening the door to step-parent adoption for some couples. The Liberal Government of 2010–14 briefly examined the issue of same-sex adoption in the later stages of its term in office, though despite Premier Denis Napthine expressing an openness to reform, the issue was never substantially tackled by the Government.

Between 2017 and March 2023, only five same-sex couples within Victoria had been formally approved to adopt children. The convenor of support group Gay Dads attributes the low number to the long drawn-out bureaucratic process involved in adopting children (by anyone) in Victoria. Also, research has shown that for various reasons there has also been a national trend away from adoption, and permanent care is more common than adoption.

=== Assisted reproduction and surrogacy ===
In May 1988, Victoria became the first state in Australia in which a child was born by use of IVF surrogacy. In July 1988, sections 11, 12, and 13 of the Infertility (Medical Procedures) Act 1984 were commenced to prevent a repetition of IVF surrogacy in Victoria, by prohibiting the use of IVF technology on women who have not been diagnosed as infertile and rendering commercial and altruistic surrogacy arrangements void. In addition, only women who were married were allowed to access IVF treatment. Then in 1997, women in de facto relationships with men were allowed access to IVF treatment under the Infertility Treatment (Amendment) Act 1997.

On 28 July 2000, re McBain v State of Victoria, Justice Sundberg of the Federal Court of Australia concluded that the Victorian legislation infringed the prohibition on discrimination found in section 22 of the Sex Discrimination Act. This eliminated any marriage requirement, but did not clearly address the medical needs requirement. This legal decision opened the door for lesbian couples to use IVF procedures.

In June 2007, the Victorian Law Reform Commission released its final report recommending that the laws be modified to allow more people to use assisted reproductive technologies and to allow same-sex couples to adopt and be recognised as parents to their partner's children. The proposed changes would also mean drastic reforms to surrogacy which, while technically legal, was practically impossible in Victoria; a woman would no longer have to be clinically infertile to be a surrogate mother. In addition, parents who have children through surrogacy would be able to go to the County Court and apply for a substitute parentage order for legal recognition. Birth certificates could use the word parent instead of mother and father.

Victoria adopted most of the 202 recommendations of the Victorian Law Reform Commission in legislation which was introduced to Parliament in September 2008. This made IVF legal for all women (except sex offenders), and gave parents of surrogate children, including female same-sex partners, greater parenting rights. Altruistic surrogacy would become legal, while commercial surrogacy would remain illegal.

The lower house voted 47–34 in favour of the Assisted Reproductive Treatment Bill 2008, with all Coalition members voting against it. After passing the upper house by just two votes, the bill was amended and forced back for another vote in the lower house, where it passed. The bill subsequently received Royal Assent on 4 December 2008 and became effective from 1 January 2010.

In July 2021, a loophole in Victorian legislation was discovered and used recently to legally "withdraw consent contracts of their sperm donation and embryos to certain recipients or groups (e.g. singles and same-sex couples)". Victoria is the only jurisdiction within Australia to legally do this. In September 2021, the Assisted Reproductive Treatment Amendment Bill 2021 was introduced and passed in the lower house in the same month to remove this loophole. It passed the upper house with an amendment in October 2021. The ARTA bill went straight back to the lower house for another vote passed again a week later, due to an amendment. The bill eventually passed both houses and received royal assent by the Governor of Victoria in the same month. The legislation went into legal effect on 15 August 2022.

=== Rainbow birth certificates ===
In July 2020, it was reported by the Australian media Star Observer that "rainbow" birth certificates became available for same-sex parents since March 2020 – due to the 10th anniversary of the Victoria government passing laws on IVF and surrogacy equality back in January 2010. Victoria has made changes to their rules to allow a child's birth registration to recognise both parents as "mother" or "father" or "parent". The new rules came into force earlier this year in March 2020. The rules will also allow families to correct previously issued birth certificates. Since March 2022, NSW also has a similar schedule where rainbow birth certificates are available.

== Vilification laws ==
In November 2024, an extensive and comprehensive "anti-vilification bill" - that explicitly includes sexual orientation, sex, sex characteristics and gender identity has been formally introduced within Victoria as printed. Victoria had no anti-vilification legislation, however does have "inciting violence towards individuals within Victoria" – as an explicit serious criminal offence listed under the Crimes Act 1958. Then in April 2025, both houses of the Parliament of Victoria passed a comprehensive and detailed long bill to ban vilification based on sex, sex characteristics, sexual orientation, and gender identity with a maximum of 5 years imprisonment. On 8 April 2025, the Governor royal assent the bill into law and will go into effect in 1 year and 2 months. The legislation once enacted and effective from and on 30 June 2026, will have various provisions and exemptions on political, religious, academic - and plus a "Sam Kerr" clause in case of unintended consequences for the repercussions of the legislation. It was reported by the media in April 2025, that Victorian state funding and budget cuts within towards the Victorian Equal Opportunity and Human Rights Commission (a statutory government body established in 1975) would potentially "create a system backlog of cases for years".

== Terrorism legislation ==
As of the 1 November 2024, Terrorism legislation still explicitly singles and points out "same-sex partner" (definition of family members) under Victorian laws. All other states and territories just lists "spouse or partners" within their Terrorism legislation.

== Discrimination protections ==
=== Overview of laws ===
Since 2000, Victoria prohibits discrimination based on sexual orientation and gender identity under the Equal Opportunity (Gender Identity and Sexual Orientation) Act 2000 – which amended the Equal Opportunity Act 1995.

Since 2010, the Equal Opportunity Act 1995 has been repealed and replaced with the Equal Opportunity Act 2010 – that still includes both sexual orientation and gender identity. Since 2021, new laws implemented went into effect that explicitly added "sex characteristics" to the Act – alongside sexual orientation and gender identity. In September 2022, the "Justice Legislation Amendment (Police and Other Matters) Bill 2022" was formally passed by both houses within the Victoria Parliament – that explicitly legally protects Victoria Police officers serving on duty, from discrimination on the basis of both sexual orientation and gender identity. The bill became an Act on assent and went into effect immediately within the same month.

Federal law also protects LGBT and Intersex people in Victoria in the form of the Sex Discrimination Amendment (Sexual Orientation, Gender Identity and Intersex Status) Act 2013.

=== Attempts to remove religious exemptions from employee protections ===
In December 2014, the Labor Government promised to rewrite equal opportunity laws to make it harder for faith-based organisations, such as schools, to discriminate against certain employees because of their sexual orientation and religious beliefs. On 31 August 2016, the government introduced the Opportunity Amendment (Religious Exceptions) Bill 2016 to the Legislative Assembly. The bill amended the Equal Opportunity Act 2010 and sought to reinstate an "inherent requirements test", which would mandate that a religious body or school could only discriminate against employees in circumstances related to the employment of a person where "conformity with the body or school's religious doctrines, beliefs or principles is an inherent requirement of the job, and, because of a particular personal attribute, the person does not meet that inherent requirement". The bill passed the assembly by 44 votes to 36, with the Coalition Opposition voting against the bill. The bill then proceeded to the Legislative Council, where the second reading stage began on 11 October. The bill was rejected by the council on 6 December 2016, the vote tied at 19 votes-all.

In August 2020, the media Star Observer reported that discrimination is the top LGBTIQ+ legal issue within Victoria.

In September 2021, the government announced it would introduce legislation to remove the exemption for religious schools and organisations "discriminate against an employee because of their sexual orientation, gender identity, marital status or other protected attribute". Furthermore, government-funded religious bodies will also be prohibited from refusing services to people based on their sexual orientation or gender. Schools and organisations will be allowed to make employment decisions based on an employee's religious beliefs where it is critical to the job, such as hiring a religious studies teacher. In October 2021, the Equal Opportunity (Religious Exceptions) Amendment Bill 2021 was formally introduced to the lower house. The Greens attempted to amend the bill to prevent privately funded religious organisations from being able to discriminate against LGBT staff, clients and students, and to limit faith-based schools ability to discriminate against students on the grounds of religious belief or affiliation to only at first enrollment, but failed when the Labor party and coalition voted to defeat the amendment. In December 2021, the bill passed both houses of the Parliament of Victoria. The Liberal party, the National party, the Liberal Democratic party, the Shooters, Fishers and Farmers party, and the independent MLC Catherine Cumming voted against the bill. The bill became an Act on royal assent by the Governor of Victoria in the same month and formally went into legal effect since 15 June 2022. In February 2022, it was announced that if the federal government implements it's religious discrimination laws that would override state and territory equal opportunity law – a lawsuit to challenge the federal government would be conducted by the Victorian government. Despite the bill passing the House of Representatives with the support of the coalition and the Labor party, the government withdrew the bill over disagreements within the party on protections for transgender students in faith-based schools.

=== Commissioner for LGBTIQ+ Communities ===
In July 2015, Minister for Equality Martin Foley announced the appointment of the inaugural Gender and Sexuality Commissioner, Ro Allen. The Commissioner has a broad role aimed at integrating the advocacy of LGBTI rights within the Government; some of these initiatives included streamlining federal and state laws to ensure passports and birth certificates align with a person's affirmed gender, and strengthening anti-discrimination protections in the workplace for transgender workers. The role of Gender and Sexuality Commissioner was later renamed the Commissioner for LGBTIQ+ Communities.

=== Victorian conversion therapy law ===
In February 2016, the government announced it would promptly introduce legislation to "crack down" on gay conversion therapists in the state. On 9 February 2016, the Health Complaints Bill 2016 was introduced to the lower house of the Victorian Parliament. The bill creates a Health Complaints Commissioner with increased powers to take action against such groups; these powers ranging from issuing public warnings to banning them from practicing in Victoria. The bill passed the lower house on 25 February 2016, passed the upper house on 14 April 2016 with minor amendments and passed the lower house with the attached amendments on 27 April 2016. Royal assent was granted on 5 May 2016. The law went into effect on 1 February 2017. The law creates a new health watchdog in the state, which provides the Commissioner with powers to issue temporary or permanent bans on health providers who aren't registered under law such as those providing 'gay conversion therapy'. A specific and targeted investigation was launched by the watchdog into the practice in May 2018, raising the spectre of financial punishment and criminal prosecution for rogue operators.

In February 2019, the newly re-elected Labor Government announced it would introduce legislation at a later date that would clearly and unequivocally denounce conversion practices and prohibit them in law – following a recommendation issued by the Health Complaints Commissioner.

On 11 November 2020 state premier Daniel Andrews and the Australian Labor party announced the Change or Suppression (Conversion) Practices Prohibition Bill denouncing conversion practices as cruel, harmful and deceptive. The introduced legislation will outlaw the 'therapy' with fines up to approximately $200,000 (AUD) or up to 10 years jail time. Along with the introduction of this legislation the government will provide increased support for those who have already been forced to experience the harmful practices. The Victorian bill to ban conversion therapy was introduced and printed in November 2020. In December 2020, the Victoria lower house passed the bill by a vote of 55-0 (with the Liberal opposition leaving the chamber).

On 5 February 2021 – by a two-thirds supermajority vote of 27–9, the bill passed the Victoria Legislative Council. The 9 votes against were from the Sustainable Australia party, the Liberal Democrats, the Justice Party, the Shooters, Fishers and Farmers Party, the independent MLC Catherine Cumming, and two Liberal Party MLCs. It goes into effect 1 year from the date of royal assent (February 2022). The bill was debated for 12 straight hours within the committee of the whole and passed the third reading, beginning around 11am. This bill was reported to be the most comprehensive conversion therapy bill passed at that time.

It was reported that the Presbyterian Church of Australia has come out and said and quoted it would "ignore this law" that passed in Victoria.

In September 2021, the center-right Liberal party (as the opposition) made a formal announcement by promising to repeal the conversion therapy law – if they win government in November 2022 (at the Victoria state election). In October 2021, the Liberal party again reversed their position regarding the issue on the conversion therapy law – by not repealing the current law.

=== Anti-vilification protections ===
In March 2025, the Victorian parliament passed the Justice Legislation Amendment (Anti-vilification and Social Cohesion) Bill, expanding existing anti-vilification laws on the basis of race and religion to include disability, gender identity, sex, sex characteristics, sexual orientations and personal association with individuals possessing these attributes. The laws come into effect on 30 June 2026. The laws were passed with support from the Labor Party, the Greens, the Legalise Cannabis party, and the Animal Justice party. The Liberal party, the National party, One Nation, the Libertarian party, and the Shooters, fishers and farmers party voted against the bill.

== Transgender rights ==
Since November 2025, all fees and costs were removed to individuals making an application to change sex on a birth certificate within Victoria under updated regulations.

Birth certificates and drivers licenses (which have no gender marker recorded) are within the jurisdiction of the states, whereas marriage and passports are matters for the Commonwealth. Victoria legally recognizes a person's gender transition. In the past it has required the person first undergo sexual reassignment surgery and divorce if married. In August 2024, the Supreme Court of Victoria upheld the ruling allowing puberty blockers on transgender children with stress and anxiety.

=== Protections ===
Gender identity is a recognized and protected attribute under Victorian anti-discrimination law, meaning a transgender person cannot be discriminated against in employment and in other areas of life. However, exemptions in the Equal Opportunity Act (2010) allow religious organisations, such as adoption/fostering agencies and charities, that do not receive government funding to discriminate against and reject LGBT employees and clients.

=== Birth certificates ===
Birth certificates are issued by the state Registry of Births, Deaths and Marriages. For many years, Victorian law required a person be unmarried in order to change the sex recorded on their certificate. The requirement was set to lapse in December 2018 following the federal legalisation of same-sex marriage in 2017, however the Victorian Parliament amended state law to this effect in May 2018.

==== 2016 failed reform effort ====
In August 2016, the Andrews Labor Government sought to pass legislation removing the unmarried requirement and also the requirement for transgender people to undergo sex reassignment surgery before amending their birth certificate. If passed, the legislation would have allowed parents to alter the gender descriptor of their child, with the child's informed consent and would also have simplified the existing administrative corrections for intersex people. The Births, Deaths and Marriages Registration Amendment Bill 2016 was introduced to the parliament on 18 August 2016 and passed the Legislative Assembly by 45 votes to 35 on 18 September 2016. The bill proceeded to the Legislative Council though was rejected by the council on 6 December 2016, following a 19-19 tied vote.

==== Removal of unmarried requirement ====
In March 2018, the government sought to address the unmarried requirement. It introduced the Justice Legislation Amendment (Access to Justice) Bill 2018 on 27 March 2018, which removed the unmarried requirement from state law. The sexual reassignment surgery requirement remained unaffected. The bill passed the Parliament on 22 May 2018. The bill received royal assent on 29 May 2018 and the portion of the law relating to birth certificates went into effect on 12 October 2018.

==== 2019 legislation ====
After returning to office at the November 2018 election, the government re-introduced legislation abolishing the sexual reassignment surgery requirement. The legislation allows applicants to self-nominate the sex listed on their birth registration as male, female, or any other gender diverse or non-binary descriptor of their choice. Children are also able to apply to alter the sex on their certificate, but only with the backing of their parents and a supporting statement from a doctor, psychologist or another prescribed person. An approval process, similar for offenders changing their name, whereby a supervising authority needs to consider the reasonableness of the application, and security and welfare issues associated with it, is incorporated in the bill.

The legislation was introduced to the Parliament on 18 June and passed the Assembly by 56 votes to 27 on 15 August 2019. The bill moved to the Legislative Council, where it passed by 26 votes to 14 on 27 August 2019. The legislation received royal assent on 3 September 2019 and went into effect on 1 May 2020. The bill was debated along partisan lines in the Parliament. The Labor Party, the Greens and some crossbenchers were supportive, though Liberal/National members voted against the legislation, citing alleged concerns regarding the safety of women in single-sex spaces and the potential for applicants to abuse the system.

==== University of Melbourne speech policy ====
In June 2021, a new speech policy has been implemented to protect transgender individuals within the University of Melbourne.

== LGBTIQ+ infrastructure and security ==
The Victorian Pride Centre opened in July 2021 in St Kilda, providing several facilities for LGBTIQ+ Victorian organisations. The LGBTIQ+ organizations is housed at the centre include the Victorian Pride Lobby, Thorne Harbour Health, Q+Law, Minus18, Australian GLBTIQ Multicultural Council, Australian Queer Archives, JOY94.9, Transgender Victoria, and the Melbourne Queer Film Festival.

In September 2020, an aged care facility just for LGBTIQ+ clients and residents was fast-tracked for construction within Prahran.

In August 2025, an established “LGBTIQ+ helpline switchboard” for dating on online apps such as Grindr - due to increased violence and hostility towards the LGBTIQ+ community recently within Victoria.

== Intersex rights ==
In December 2025, an extensive and broad bill was introduced to the Parliament of Victoria that legally protects intersex individuals from non-consenting, outdated and/or inappropriate medical procedures. In February 2026, the bill passed both houses of the Parliament of Victoria and was approved by the Governor with Royal Assent.

In June 2016, Organisation Intersex International Australia pointed to contradictory statements by the Victorian and other Australian governments, suggesting that the dignity and rights of LGBT and intersex people are recognised while, at the same time, harmful practices on intersex children continue.

In March 2017, representatives of Androgen Insensitivity Syndrome Support Group Australia and Organisation Intersex International Australia participated in an Australian and Aotearoa/New Zealand consensus "Darlington Statement" by intersex community organisations and others. The statement calls for legal reform, including the criminalisation of deferrable intersex medical interventions on children, an end to legal classification of sex, and improved access to peer support.

In October 2021, both the Star Observer and the ABC reported that the Victorian government plans to legally ban intersex surgery on babies and infants. No bill has been formally introduced yet.

== Gender-neutral bathrooms ==
In April 2021, all workplaces within Victoria under an order-in-council are legally required to have policies of gender-neutral bathrooms access to be provided for any individual – regardless of sex or gender identity.

In September 2021, the Victoria Youth Parliament passed a bill to implement gender-neutral bathrooms and toilets. The Victorian Youth Minister and MP Ros Spence has the final say on whether it becomes officially and formally Victoria legislation.

== Victoria police trust ==
In November 2021, it was reported and revealed that 80% or 4-in-5 individuals of the LGBTIQ community do not trust the Victorian police within surveys.

== Grants funding ==
In May 2024, the Victorian Government announced 800k grants funding to several LGBTIQ community organizations and charities within Victoria.

== Summary table ==
Same-sex sexual activity legal	Yes (Since 1981 for men; always for women)
Equal age of consent	Yes
Equal opportunity laws explicitly covering all areas and explicitly includes sexual orientation, sex characteristics and gender identity – religious exemptions repealed since 2022	Yes
Gender-neutral bathroom law implemented	Yes
Intersex minors protected from invasive surgical procedures	Yes
Hate crime laws explicitly covering both sexual orientation & gender identity or expression	Yes
Explicit anti-LGBTIQ vilification and hate speech laws	Yes
Historical gay sex criminal records expunged plus gay panic defense abolished	Yes
LGBTIQA+ Community Commissioner for Victoria	Yes (First jurisdiction in Australia to do so)
Recognition in state law of same-sex couples as domestic partners	Yes
Full joint/step adoption as well as full parentage from both IVF and altruistic surrogacy procedures for same-sex couples	Yes
Same-sex marriage implemented	Yes (Since 2017)
Conversion therapy legally banned	Yes (Since 2022)
Implemented birth certificate law reforms without impediments and costs	Yes
MSMs allowed to donate blood	Yes (Since 2026, for monogamous gay and bi men)

== See also ==
- Transgender rights in Australia
- Intersex rights in Australia
- LGBTQ rights in Australia
- LGBTQ rights in Queensland
- LGBTQ rights in New South Wales
- LGBTQ rights in Tasmania
- Australian Marriage Law Postal Survey
- Same-sex marriage in Australia
