= Minister for Health Infrastructure =

Minister for Health Infrastructure of Victoria
- Victorian coat of arms

- Flag of Victoria
- Incumbent; Melissa Horne MP since 19 December 2024
- Style: The Honourable
- Member of: Parliament; Cabinet
- Reports to: Premier
- Nominator: Premier
- Appointer: Governor on the recommendation of the premier
- Term length: At the governor's pleasure
- Inaugural holder: Mary-Anne Thomas MP
- Formation: 27 June 2022

The Minister for Health Infrastructure is a minister within the Cabinet of Victoria tasked with the responsibility of overseeing the Victorian Government's health and hospital laws and initiatives.

It was created in December 2022 following the 2022 Victorian state election, the Andrews Government and the portfolio was initially held alongside the Minister for Health portfolio.

Mary-Anne Thomas was the inaugural minister and the current minister is Melissa Horne.

== Ministers for Health Infrastructure ==
Order	MP	Party affiliation	Ministerial title	Term start	Term end	Time in office	Notes
1	Mary-Anne Thomas MP	Labor	Minister for Health Infrastructure	5 December 2022	19 December 2024	2 years, 14 days	
2	Melissa Horne MP	Labor	Minister for Health Infrastructure	19 December 2024	Incumbent	1 year, 262 days	
