= Minister for the Suburban Rail Loop =

Australian state ministry portfolio in Victoria

Minister for the Suburban Rail Loop of Victoria
- Victorian coat of arms

- Flag of Victoria
- Department of Transport and Planning and Suburban Rail Loop Authority
- Style: The Honourable
- Member of: Parliament; Executive council
- Reports to: Premier
- Nominator: Premier
- Appointer: Governor; on the recommendation of the Premier
- Term length: At the governor's pleasure
- First holder: Jacinta Allan
- Final holder: Nick Staikos
- Abolished: 4 August 2026

The Minister for the Suburban Rail Loop was a minister within the Executive Council of Victoria tasked with overseeing the construction of the Suburban Rail Loop, and the operations of the Suburban Rail Loop Authority.

A number of acts of parliament give the minister executive powers relevant to the portfolio, these include the Development Victoria Act 2003, Suburban Rail Loop Act 2021, and the Victorian Planning Authority Act 2017.

== Ministers ==
| Order | Minister | Party affiliation | Ministerial title | Term start | Term end | Time in office | Notes |
|---|---|---|---|---|---|---|---|
| 1 | Jacinta Allan MP | Labor | Minister for the Suburban Rail Loop | 22 June 2020 | 2 October 2023 | 3 years, 102 days | |
| 2 | Danny Pearson MP | Labor | Minister for the Suburban Rail Loop | 2 October 2023 | 19 December 2024 | 1 year, 78 days | |
| 3 | Harriet Shing MLC | Labor | Minister for the Suburban Rail Loop | 19 December 2024 | 15 April 2026 | 1 year, 117 days | |
| 4 | Nick Staikos MP | Labor | Minister for the Suburban Rail Loop | 15 April 2026 | 4 August 2026 | 111 days | |
