= Minister for Youth Justice (Victoria) =

Australian state ministry portfolio

Minister for Youth Justice of Victoria
- Victorian coat of arms

- Flag of Victoria
- Incumbent; Enver Erdogan MLC since 5 December 2022
- Style: The Honourable
- Member of: Parliament; Executive council
- Reports to: Premier
- Nominator: Premier
- Appointer: Governor on the recommendation of the premier
- Term length: At the governor's pleasure
- Inaugural holder: Ben Carroll MP
- Formation: 29 November 2018

The Minister for Youth Justice is a minister within the Executive Council of Victoria.

== Ministers ==
Order	MP	Party affiliation	Term start	Term end	Time in office	Notes
1	Ben Carroll MP	Labor	29 November 2018	22 June 2020	1 year, 206 days	
2	Natalie Hutchins MP	Labor	22 June 2020	27 June 2022	2 years, 5 days	
3	Sonya Kilkenny MP	Labor	4 July 2022	5 December 2022	154 days	
4	Enver Erdogan MLC	Labor	5 December 2022	Incumbent	3 years, 276 days	
