= Minister for Crime Prevention =

Australian state ministry portfolio in Victoria

Minister for Crime Prevention of Victoria
- Victorian coat of arms

- Flag of Victoria

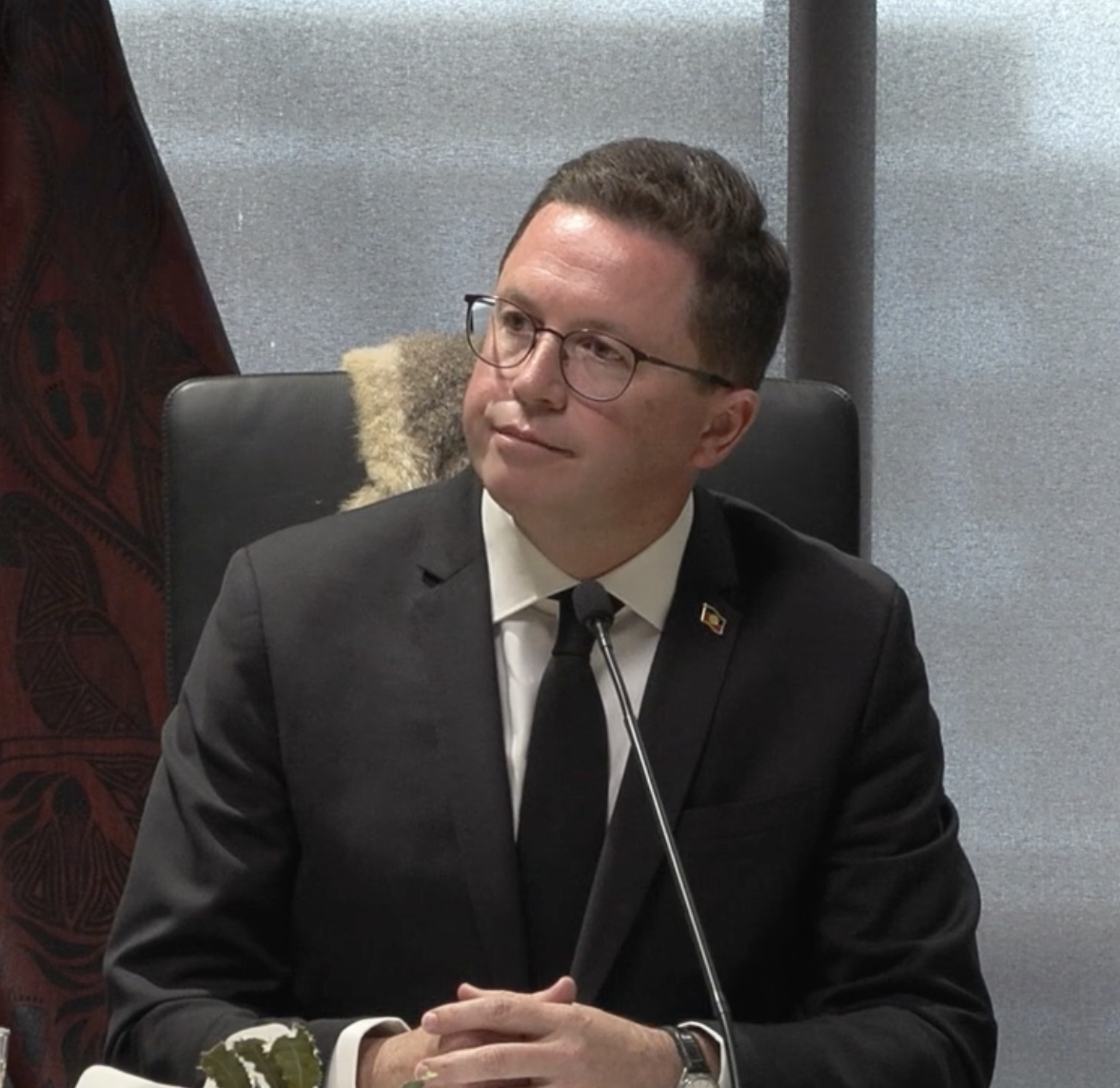
- Incumbent; Anthony Carbines MP since 27 June 2022
- Style: The Honourable
- Member of: Parliament; Executive council
- Reports to: Premier
- Nominator: Premier
- Appointer: Governor on the recommendation of the premier
- Term length: At the governor's pleasure
- Inaugural holder: Andrew McIntosh MP (Lib)
- Formation: 2 December 2010

The Minister for Crime Prevention is a ministry portfolio within the Executive Council of Victoria.

== Ministers ==
Order	MP	Party affiliation	Term start	Term end	Time in office	Notes
1	Andrew McIntosh MP	Liberal	2 December 2010	16 April 2013	2 years, 135 days	
2	Edward O'Donohue MLC	Liberal	22 April 2013	4 December 2014	1 year, 226 days	
3	Ben Carroll MP	Labor	29 November 2018	22 June 2020	1 year, 206 days	
4	Natalie Hutchins MP	Labor	22 June 2020	27 June 2022	2 years, 5 days	
5	Anthony Carbines MP	Labor	27 June 2022	Incumbent	4 years, 72 days	
