= Minister for Prevention of Family Violence (Victoria) =

Australian state ministry portfolio

Minister for Prevention of Family Violence of Victoria
- Victorian coat of arms

- Flag of Victoria
- Incumbent; Vicki Ward MP since 2 October 2023
- Style: The Honourable
- Member of: Parliament; Executive council
- Reports to: Premier
- Nominator: Premier
- Appointer: Governor on the recommendation of the premier
- Term length: At the governor's pleasure
- Inaugural holder: Fiona Richardson MLC
- Formation: 4 December 2014

The Minister for Prevention of Family Violence is a ministry portfolio within the Executive Council of Victoria.

== Ministers ==
Order	MP	Party affiliation	Ministerial title	Term start	Term end	Time in office	Notes
1	Fiona Richardson MP	Labor	Minister for Prevention of Family Violence	4 December 2014	23 August 2017	2 years, 262 days	
2	Natalie Hutchins MP	Labor	Minister for Prevention of Family Violence	13 September 2017	29 November 2018	1 year, 77 days	
3	Gabrielle Williams MP	Labor	Minister for Prevention of Family Violence	29 November 2018	27 June 2022	3 years, 210 days	
4	Ros Spence MP	Labor	Minister for Prevention of Family Violence	27 June 2022	2 October 2023	1 year, 97 days	
5	Vicki Ward MP	Labor	Minister for Prevention of Family Violence	2 October 2023	Incumbent	2 years, 340 days	
