= Transgender Victoria =

Australian transgender rights organization

- Abbreviation: TGV
- Formation: 2000
- Type: NGO
- Purpose: Promotion of transgender human rights and health
- Region served: Victoria, Australia
- CEO: Dr. Son Vivienne
- Website: tgv.org.au

Transgender Victoria (TGV) is a transgender rights organization operating in Victoria, Australia. In December 2014, Transgender Victoria won the Community Organisation Award, from the Australian Human Rights Commission.

== Origins and management ==
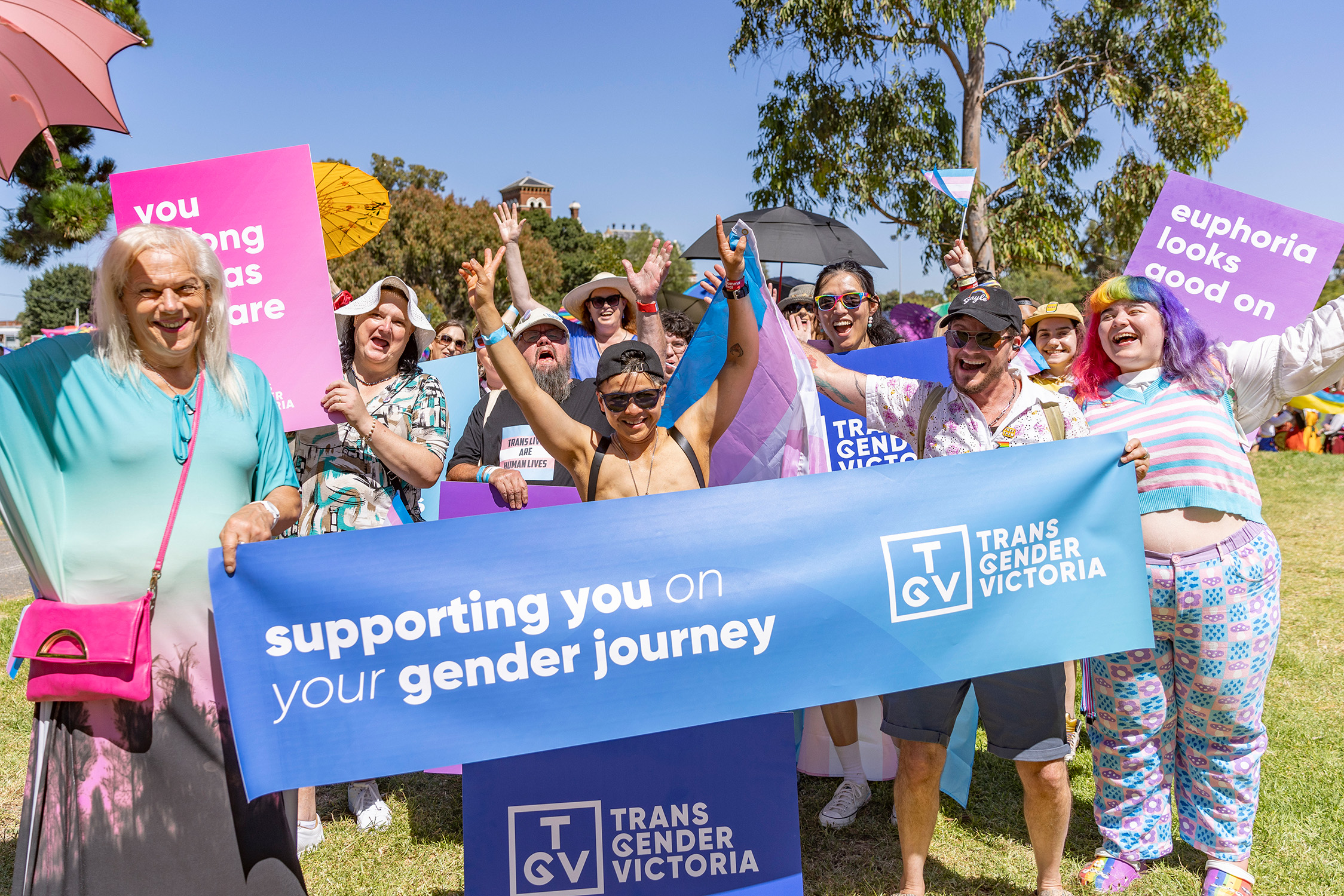
A group of Transgender Victoria volunteers marched in the 2024 Midsumma Pride March

Transgender Victoria was co-founded by Kayleen White and Sally Goldner, in the late 1990s. Current board members include Jax Brown, Michelle McNamara, Fidan Senova, Sophie Shrimpton and Dr. Son Vivienne.

== Activism ==
Transgender Victoria presents on transgender and gender diverse issues to universities and medical students, media organisations and many others. A "What makes an Ally" project in partnership with Ygender promotes acceptance of transgender and gender diverse people. TGV also provides peer support, in particular on anxiety and depression issues. TGV also provides LGBT and intersex cultural competency training in aged care.

TGV works on advocacy issues in partnership with many other organizations, including on anti-discrimination protections. On 25 June 2013, the Commonwealth Sex Discrimination Amendment (Sexual Orientation, Gender Identity and Intersex Status) Act passed following collaborative advocacy work, and with cross-party support. It became law on 1 August 2013.

== Awards and recognition ==
Transgender Victoria received the Australian Human Rights Commission's 2014 "Community Award - Organisation" in December 2014. TGV was shortlisted "for its dedication to achieving justice, equity and quality health and community services for transgender people, their partners, families and friends".

== Affiliations ==
TGV is a member of LGBTIQ+ Health Australia.

== See also ==
- Transgender rights in Australia
- Georgie Stone
