= Enver Erdogan =

Australian politician

The Honourable Enver Erdogan MLC
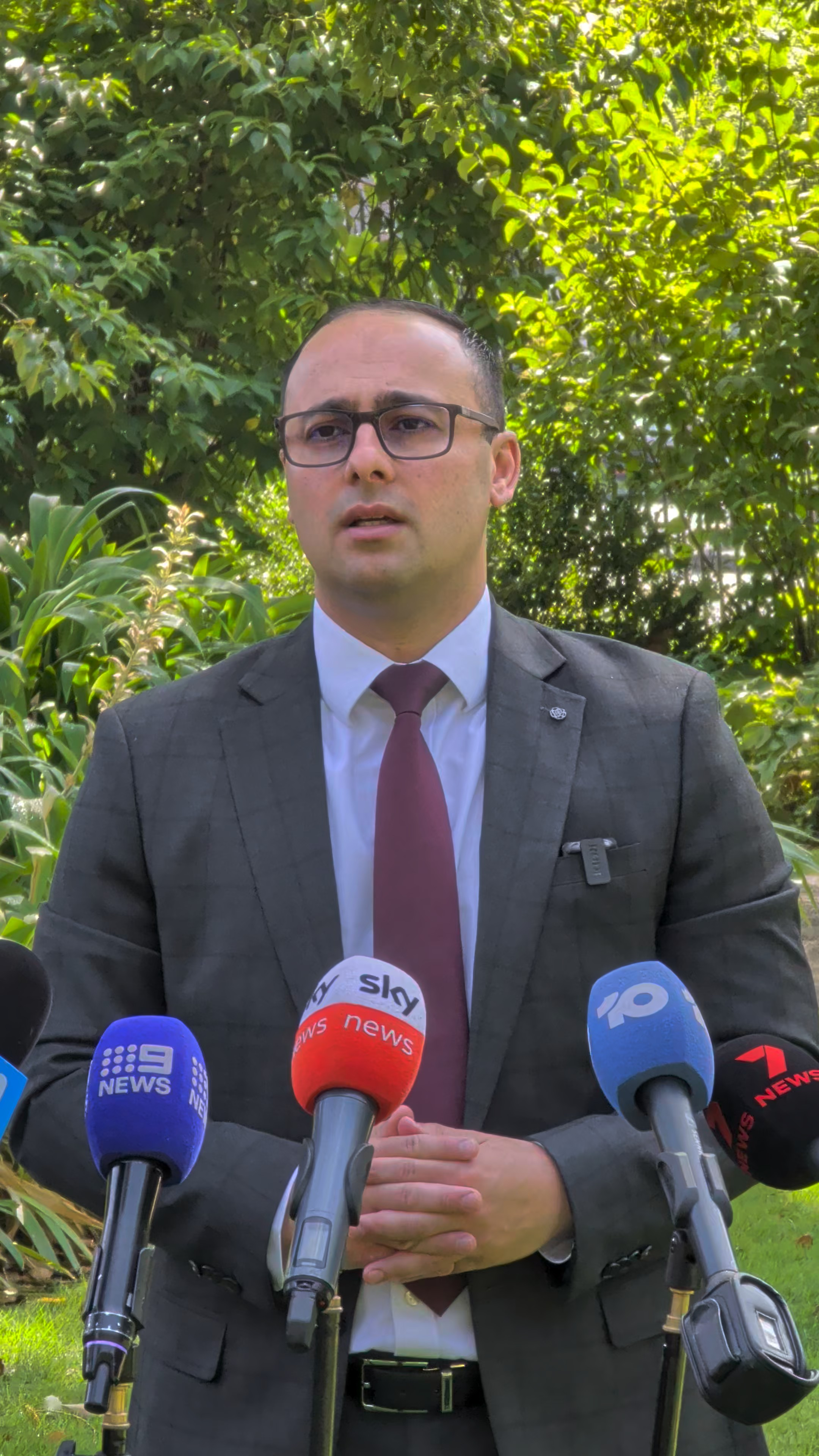

Minister for Finance
- Incumbent
- Assumed office 4 August 2026
- Premier: Ben Carroll
- Preceded by: Sonya Kilkenny

Minister for Government Services
- Incumbent
- Assumed office 4 August 2026
- Premier: Ben Carroll
- Preceded by: Ingrid Stitt

Minister for Casino, Gaming and Liquor Regulation
- Incumbent
- Assumed office 19 December 2024
- Premier: Jacinta AllanBen Carroll
- Preceded by: Melissa Horne
Other ministerial offices
Minister for the Environment
In office 15 April 2026 – 4 August 2026
Premier	Jacinta Allan
Preceded by	Steve Dimopoulos
Succeeded by	Jaclyn Symes
Minister for Outdoor Recreation
In office 15 April 2026 – 4 August 2026
Premier	Jacinta Allan
Preceded by	Steve Dimopoulos
Succeeded by	Position abolished
Minister for Corrections
In office 5 December 2022 – 15 April 2026
Premier	Daniel AndrewsJacinta Allan
Preceded by	Sonya Kilkenny
Succeeded by	Paul Hamer
Minister for Youth Justice
In office 5 December 2022 – 15 April 2026
Premier	Daniel AndrewsJacinta Allan
Preceded by	Sonya Kilkenny
Succeeded by	Paul Hamer
Minister for Victim Support
In office 5 December 2022 – 19 December 2024
Premier	Daniel AndrewsJacinta Allan
Preceded by	Sonya Kilkenny
Succeeded by	Anthony Carbines (as Minister for Victims)

Member of the Victorian Legislative Council
- Incumbent
- Assumed office 15 August 2019
- Preceded by: Philip Dalidakis
- Constituency: Northern Metropolitan Region (2022–present); Southern Metropolitan Region (2019–2022)

Councillor of the City of Moreland
- In office 2008–2012
- Ward: North-West

Personal details
- Party: Labor
- Education: La Trobe University

Enver Erdogan is an Australian politician and lawyer who has served as a Minister in the Victorian Government since 2022. A member of the Australian Labor Party, he represents the Northern Metropolitan Region in the Victorian Legislative Council. Erdogan currently serves as Minister for Finance, Minister for Government Services, and Minister for Casino, Gaming and Liquor Regulation.

== Early life and education ==
Erdogan studied at La Trobe University, obtaining a Bachelor of Economics and a Bachelor of Laws. He later completed a Graduate Diploma in Legal Practice at the Leo Cussen Centre for Law and was admitted to the Supreme Court of Victoria in 2011. He is also a Graduate of the Australian Institute of Company Directors (GAICD).

Before his parliamentary career, Erdogan worked as an Associate at the law firm Maurice Blackburn, specialising in representing injured workers. He was elected to the City of Moreland (now the City of Merri-bek) in 2008 and served until 2012. He also sat on the Board of the Municipal Association of Victoria, the peak body representing local councils in the state.

== Political career ==
=== Entry to Parliament ===
Erdogan entered the Parliament of Victoria in August 2019 when he was appointed to the Legislative Council to fill a vacancy created by the resignation of Philip Dalidakis. He represented the Southern Metropolitan Region until the 2022 Victorian state election when he was elected to represent the Northern Metropolitan Region.

=== Parliamentary roles ===
From February 2020 to August 2022, Erdogan chaired the Legislative Council's Economy and Infrastructure Committee. As Committee Chair, he presided over inquiries into Expanding Melbourne's Free Tram Zone, Increase in Victoria's Road Toll, Use of School Buses in Rural and Regional Victoria, the Impact of the COVID-19 pandemic on the tourism and events sectors, Victoria's Multi Purpose Taxi Program, and the Closure of the Hazelwood and Yallourn Power Stations.

In June 2022, he was appointed Parliamentary Secretary to the Attorney-General, serving until December that year.

=== Ministerial career ===
Erdogan was sworn in as a minister in the Third Andrews Ministry on 5 December 2022, taking on the portfolios of Corrections, Youth Justice, and Victim Support. He retained these portfolios when Jacinta Allan became Premier in September 2023, and was appointed to his current portfolios after a reshuffle in December 2024.

In the Corrections portfolio, Erdogan has overseen the expansion of prison capacity in response to changes in Victoria's bail laws, including the opening of the Western Plains Correctional Centre, and investment into education and employment programs to reduce recidivism. As Minister for Youth Justice, he has been responsible for the implementation of the Youth Justice Act 2024 and reforms aimed at diversion and rehabilitation. As Minister for Casino, Gaming and Liquor Regulation, he has managed reforms to liquor licensing, gambling regulation, and the establishment of a tobacco licensing scheme intended to combat illicit sales and organised crime.

== Political views ==
Erdogan has identified access to education, affordable and safe transport, and fair wages as key priorities. His broader policy interests include economic development, industrial relations, manufacturing, and law reforms.

== Personal life ==
Erdogan is married and has two daughters. He is passionate about both Australian rules football and soccer, and is a lifelong supporter of the Collingwood Football Club. His personal interests include history and international affairs, and he is the first Member of Parliament of Kurdish descent in Australia.
