= Steve Dimopoulos =

Australian politician (born 1972)

The Honourable Steve Dimopoulos MP
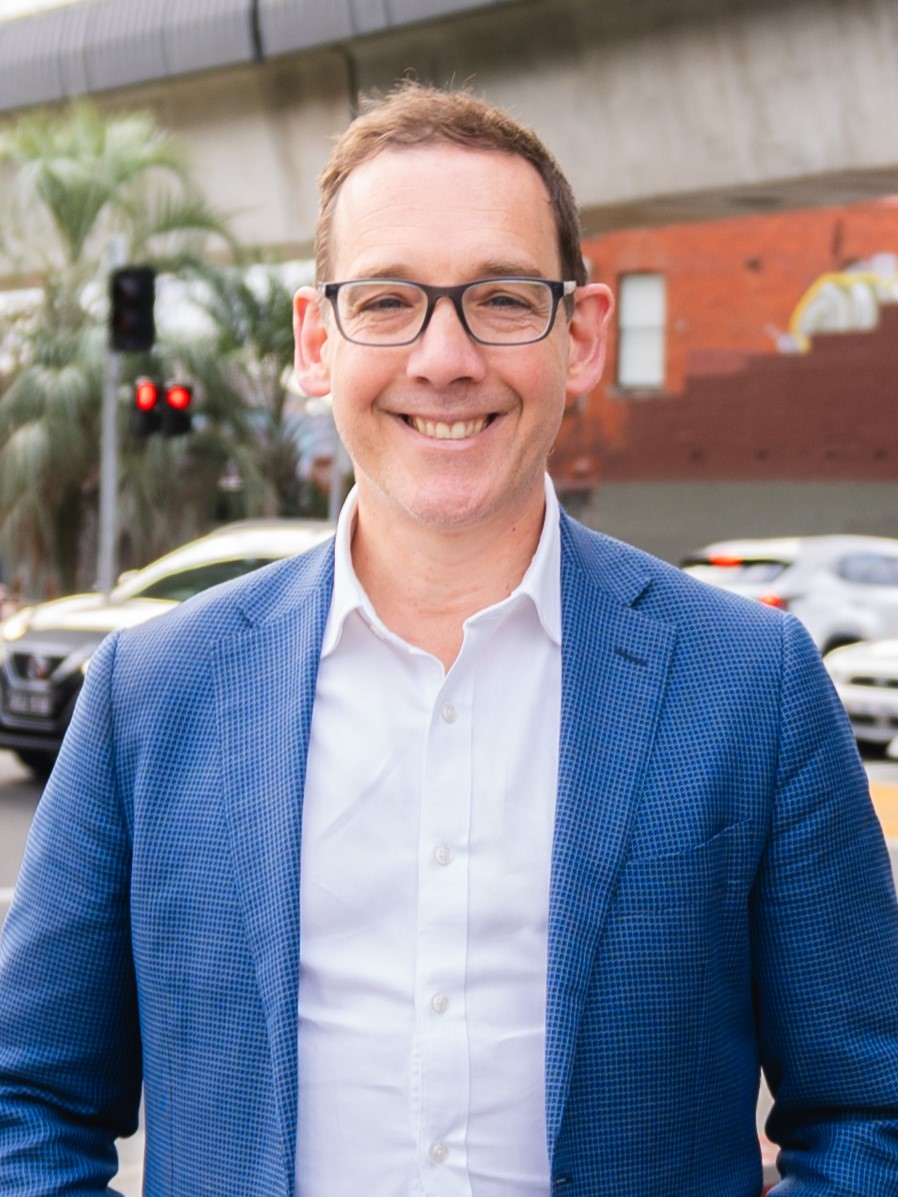
- Dimopoulos in 2025

Minister for WorkSafe and the TAC
- Incumbent
- Assumed office 4 August 2026
- Premier: Ben Carroll
- Preceded by: Ben Carroll

Minister for Equality
- Incumbent
- Assumed office 4 August 2026
- Premier: Ben Carroll
- Preceded by: Vicki Ward

Minister for Sport
- Incumbent
- Assumed office 4 August 2026
- Premier: Ben Carroll
- Preceded by: Himself (as Minister forSport and Major Events)
Other ministerial positions
Minister for Economic Growth and Jobs
In office 15 April 2026 – 4 August 2026
Premier	Jacinta Allan
Preceded by	Danny Pearson
Succeeded by	Anthony Carbines
Minister for Sport and Major Events
In office 15 April 2026 – 4 August 2026
Premier	Jacinta Allan
Preceded by	Himself (as Minister for Tourism, Sport and Major Events)
Succeeded by	Anthony Carbines (as Minister for Major Events)
Minister for the Environment
In office 2 October 2023 – 15 April 2026
Premier	Jacinta Allan
Preceded by	Ingrid Stitt
Succeeded by	Enver Erdogan
Minister for Tourism, Sport and Major Events
In office 27 June 2022 – 15 April 2026
Premier	Jacinta Allan; Daniel Andrews
Preceded by	Martin Pakula
Succeeded by	Natalie Suleyman (as Minister for Tourism); Himself (as Minister for Sport and Major Events)
Minister for Outdoor Recreation
In office 2 October 2023 – 15 April 2026
Premier	Jacinta Allan
Preceded by	Sonya Kilkenny
Succeeded by	Enver Erdogan
Minister for Creative Industries
In office 27 June 2022 – 2 October 2023
Premier	Daniel Andrews
Preceded by	Danny Pearson
Succeeded by	Colin Brooks

Member of the Victorian Legislative Assembly for Oakleigh
- Incumbent
- Assumed office 29 November 2014
- Preceded by: Ann Barker

Personal details
- Born: 1972 (age 53–54) Australia
- Party: Labor
- Spouse: John Cardona
- Education: Monash University
- Website: stevedimopoulos.com.au

Steve Dimopoulos (born 1972) is an Australian politician. He has been a Labor Party member of the Victorian Legislative Assembly since 2014 representing the electoral district of Oakleigh. He served as the Minister for Tourism, Sport and Major Events and the Minister for Creative Industries in the Second Andrews Ministry from June 2022 to September 2023. He continued as Minister for Tourism, Sport and Major Events, Minister for the Environment (until April 2026), and Minister for Outdoor Recreation (until April 2026) in the Allan Labor Ministry.

== Early life ==
Dimopoulos was raised in the working-class suburb of Hughesdale. Dimopoulos was publicly educated at Hughesdale Primary School and later attended Chadstone High School. During his time at Hughesdale Primary School, it was threatened with closure by then Kennett Liberal Government with due to demographic changes, but ultimately avoided closing.

Dimopoulos later studied at Monash University, Clayton Campus where he studied a Bachelor of Arts with Honours, majoring in Politics and History. During this time Dimopoulos worked as an Electorate Officer for the late Member for Hotham, Simon Crean AC.

In 1994, Dimopoulos would go on to earn a Graduate Diploma in Industrial Relations and Resource Management from the University of Melbourne.

== Early career ==
In 2002, Dimopoulos opened his own small business, called Cosmic Bear, a cafe which was located along Atherton Road in Oakleigh. Dimopoulos parted ways with the business in 2005, following his election as Mayor of the City of Monash.

While operating Cosmic Bear Cafe, Dimopoulos worked at the Victorian Multicultural Commission as Manager in Policy and Programs, in August 2003 until December 2010. In January 2011, Dimopoulos worked as the assistant director of the Department of Justice and Regulation.

== Political career ==
=== Monash City Council (2003-2014) ===
Steve was elected as a Municipal Councillor to the City of Monash in 2003, representing Huntingdale Ward. He was subsequently elected Mayor of the City of Monash in 2005. Following, a restructuring of Wards in the council to transition from Single-member Wards to Multiple-member, Dimopoulos was reelected to council in 2005, 2008, and 2012, representing Oakleigh ward.

=== First Andrews Labor Government (2014-2018) ===
Dimopoulos was elected in 2014 to represent the electorate of Oakleigh, succeeding former Labor MP Ann Barker. Dimopoulos became the first MP of Greek Descent to represent the electorate in 87 years. In December 2014, Dimopoulous was appointed to the Scrutiny of Acts and Regulations Committee and was later appointed to the Public Accounts and Estimates Committee in April 2018.

==== Level Crossing Removal Project (LXRP) ====
Dimopoulos was a vocal advocate for the Level Crossing Removal Project, which removed 6 level crossing in the Oakleigh Electorate between 2014 and 2018. Between the Carnegie and Clayton portion of the Cranbourne-Pakenham Line. This project also created the Djerring Trail, a 17 km stretch of urban green space, which connected the north and south of the line for the first time in decades.

=== Second Andrews Labor Government (2018-2022) ===
Following reelection in 2018, Dimopoulos was promoted to Parliamentary Secretary to the Treasurer. He then served as Parliamentary Secretary to the Premier, and Parliamentary Secretary for Mental Health from 2020.

On the 27th of June 2022, Dimopoulos was promoted and sworn in as Minister for Tourism, Sport and Major Events and Minister for Creative Industries on 27 June 2022.

=== Third Andrews Labor Government (2022-2023) ===
Originally a member of Labor Action, Dimopoulos moved across to Labor Left along with six of his colleagues shortly after the 2022 Victorian state election; the move of his colleagues and himself meant that Labor Left constituted a majority of the state Labor caucus.

=== Allan Labor Government (2023-2026) ===
Following the resignation of Premier Daniel Andrews in 2023, Dimopoulos was promoted to Minister for the Environment and Minister for Outdoor Recreation in the Allan Ministry, and retained his role as Minister for Tourism, Sports and Major Events.

=== Electoral history ===
Electoral history of Steve Dimopoulos in the Parliament of Victoria
Year	Electorate	Party	First Preference Result				Two Candidate Result			
Year	Electorate	Party	Votes	%	+%	Position	Votes	%	+%	Result
2014	Oakleigh	Labor	15,903	45.8	+4.3	1st	20,224	58.2	+3.1	Elected
2018	Oakleigh	Labor	19,202	53.57	+7.82	1st	23,587	65.78	+7.60	Elected
2022	Oakleigh	Labor	19,778	45.0	−8.3	1st	27,876	63.5	−2.6	Elected

== Personal life ==
Dimopoulos is of Greek descent. He and Harriet Shing are the first openly gay frontbenchers in the Parliament of Victoria.

Dimopoulos is a support of local clubs and is the joint Number One ticket holder, with Clare O'Neil, for the Oakleigh Amateur Football Club.

Dimopoulos also holds membership with a number of community groups such as the Rotary Club of Oakleigh Clayton Huntingdale Inc., Monash Glen Eira Historical Society, and Thalassaemia and Sickle Cell Australia.

Victorian Legislative Assembly
Preceded by Ann Barker	Member for Oakleigh; 2014–present	Incumbent
Political offices
Preceded by Martin Pakula	Minister for Tourism, Sport and Major Events; 2022–present	Incumbent
Preceded by Danny Pearson	Minister for Creative Industries; 2022–2023	Succeeded by Colin Brooks
