= Attorney-General of Victoria =

Chief law officer for the state of Victoria, Australia

- Victorian coat of arms

- Flag of Victoria
- Incumbent; Sonya Kilkenny since 19 December 2024
- Department of Justice and Community Safety
- Style: The Honourable
- Member of: Parliament; Cabinet; Executive Council
- Reports to: Premier of Victoria
- Seat: Level 26, 121 Exhibition Street, Melbourne
- Nominator: Premier of Victoria
- Appointer: Governor of Victoria on the advice of the premier
- Term length: At the governor's pleasure
- Formation: 15 Jul 1851
- First holder: Sir William Stawell
- Deputy: Solicitor-General
- Website: www.justice.vic.gov.au

The Attorney-General of Victoria, in formal contexts also Attorney-General or Attorney General for Victoria, is a minister in the Government of Victoria, Australia. The Attorney-General is a senior minister in the state government and the First Law Officer of the State.

The current Attorney-General of Victoria has, since December 2024, been Sonya Kilkenny of the Australian Labor Party. The Attorney-General is one of the ministers who administer parts of the Victorian Department of Justice and Community Safety, with responsibility for the state's courts and tribunals.

Bill Slater served as Attorney-General of Victoria 6 separate times and Arthur Rylah holds the record for the longest term of 11 years and 334 days.

== Colonial Victoria ==
Order	MP	Term start	Term end	Time in office	Notes
1	William Stawell MP	15 July 1851	25 February 1857	5 years, 225 days	
2	Thomas Fellows MP	25 February 1857	11 March 1857	14 days	
3	Henry Samuel Chapman	11 March 1857	29 April 1857	49 days	
4	Archibald Michie MP	29 April 1857	10 March 1858	315 days	
(3)	Henry Samuel Chapman MP	10 March 1858	27 October 1859	1 year, 231 days	
5	John Wood MP	27 October 1859	26 November 1860	1 year, 30 days	
6	Richard Davies Ireland MP	26 November 1860	29 July 1861	245 days	
7	Butler Cole Aspinall MP	29 July 1861	14 November 1861	108 days	
(6)	Richard Davies Ireland MP	14 November 1861	27 June 1863	1 year, 225 days	
8	George Higinbotham MP	27 June 1863	6 May 1868	4 years, 314 days	
9	Morgan McDonnell MP	6 May 1868	11 July 1868	66 days	
10	George Paton Smith MP	11 July 1868	20 September 1869	1 year, 71 days	
(9)	Morgan McDonnell MP	20 September 1869	9 April 1870	201 days	
(4)	Archibald Michie MP	9 April 1870	19 June 1871	1 year, 71 days	
11	Robert Walsh MP	5 July 1871	10 June 1872	341 days	
12	James Stephen MP	10 June 1872	1 May 1874	1 year, 325 days	
13	George Kerferd MP	2 May 1874	7 August 1875	1 year, 97 days	
14	Robert Le Poer Trench	9 August 1875	20 October 1875	72 days	
(13)	George Kerferd MP	20 October 1875	21 May 1877	1 year, 213 days	
(14)	Robert Le Poer Trench	22 May 1877	27 March 1878	309 days	
15	Bryan O'Loghlen MP	27 March 1878	5 March 1880	1 year, 344 days	
(13)	George Kerferd MP	5 March 1880	3 August 1880	151 days	
16	William Vale MP	3 August 1880	9 July 1881	340 days	
(15)	Bryan O'Loghlen MP	9 July 1881	8 March 1883	1 year, 242 days	
(13)	George Kerferd MP	8 March 1883	1 January 1886	2 years, 299 days	
17	Henry Wrixon MP	18 February 1886	5 November 1890	4 years, 260 days	
18	William Shiels MP	5 November 1890	16 February 1892	1 year, 103 days	
19	John Gavan Duffy MP	16 February 1892	28 April 1892	72 days	
(18)	William Shiels MP	28 April 1892	23 January 1893	270 days	
(15)	Bryan O'Loghlen MP	23 January 1893	27 September 1894	1 year, 247 days	
20	Isaac Isaacs MP	27 September 1894	5 December 1899	5 years, 69 days	
21	William Irvine MP	5 December 1899	19 November 1900	349 days	
(20)	Isaac Isaacs MP	19 November 1900	4 June 1901	197 days	
22	Samuel Gillott MP	4 June 1901	10 June 1902	1 year, 6 days	

== Post-federation ==
Order	MP	Party affiliation	Term start	Term end	Time in office	Notes
(21)	William Irvine MP	Reform	10 June 1902	7 September 1903	1 year, 89 days	
23	John Mark Davies MLC	Reform	7 September 1903	8 January 1909	5 years, 123 days	
24	James Drysdale Brown MLC	Commonwealth Liberal	8 January 1909	9 December 1913	4 years, 335 days	
25	William Evans MLC	Labor	9 December 1913	22 December 1913	13 days	
26	Donald Mackinnon MP	Commonwealth Liberal	22 December 1913	9 November 1915	1 year, 322 days	
27	Harry Lawson MP	Commonwealth Liberal	9 November 1915	29 November 1917	2 years, 20 days	
28	Agar Wynne MP	Nationalist	29 November 1917	21 March 1918	112 days	
(27)	Harry Lawson MP	Nationalist	21 March 1918	21 October 1919	1 year, 214 days	
29	Arthur Robinson MLC	Nationalist	21 October 1919	11 July 1924	4 years, 264 days	
30	Henry Cohen MLC	Nationalist	11 July 1924	18 July 1924	7 days	
31	Bill Slater MP	Labor	18 July 1924	18 November 1924	123 days	
32	Frederic Eggleston MP	Nationalist	18 November 1924	28 April 1927	2 years, 161 days	
33	John Allan MP	Country	28 April 1927	20 May 1927	22 days	
(31)	Bill Slater MP	Labor	20 May 1927	22 November 1928	1 year, 186 days	
34	Ian Macfarlan MP	Nationalist	22 November 1928	12 December 1929	1 year, 20 days	
(31)	Bill Slater MP	Labor	12 December 1929	19 May 1932	2 years, 159 days	
35	Robert Menzies MP	United Australia Party	19 May 1932	25 July 1934	2 years, 67 days	
(34)	Ian Macfarlan MP	United Australia Party	25 July 1934	2 April 1935	251 days	
36	Albert Bussau MP	United Country	2 April 1935	18 April 1938	3 years, 16 days	
37	Henry Bailey MP	United Country	26 April 1938	14 September 1943	5 years, 141 days	
(31)	Bill Slater MP	Labor	14 September 1943	18 September 1943	4 days	
(34)	Ian Macfarlan MP	United Australia Party	18 September 1943	21 November 1945	2 years, 64 days	
(31)	Bill Slater MP	Labor	21 November 1945	20 November 1947	1 year, 364 days	
38	Trevor Oldham MP	Liberal	20 November 1947	27 June 1950	2 years, 219 days	
39	Tom Mitchell MP	Country	27 June 1950	28 October 1952	2 years, 123 days	
40	Thomas Hollway MP	Electoral Reform League	28 October 1952	31 October 1952	3 days	
(39)	Tom Mitchell MP	Country	31 October 1952	17 December 1952	47 days	
(31)	Bill Slater MLC	Labor	17 December 1952	7 June 1955	2 years, 172 days	
41	William Leggatt MP	Liberal Country Party	7 June 1955	8 June 1955	1 day	
42	Arthur Rylah MP	Liberal Country Party	8 June 1955	9 May 1967	11 years, 335 days	
43	George Reid MP	Liberal Country Party	9 May 1967	30 May 1973	6 years, 21 days	
44	Vernon Wilcox MP	Liberal	30 May 1973	31 March 1976	2 years, 306 days	
45	Alan Hunt MLC	Liberal	31 March 1976	6 May 1976	36 days	
46	Haddon Storey MLC	Liberal	6 May 1976	8 April 1982	5 years, 337 days	
47	John Cain MP	Labor	8 April 1982	8 September 1983	1 year, 153 days	
48	Jim Kennan MLC	Labor	8 September 1983	14 December 1987	4 years, 97 days	
49	Andrew McCutcheon MP	Labor	14 December 1987	2 April 1990	2 years, 109 days	
(48)	Jim Kennan MP	Labor	2 April 1990	6 October 1992	2 years, 187 days	
50	Jan Wade MP	Liberal	6 October 1992	20 October 1999	7 years, 14 days	
51	Rob Hulls MP	Labor	20 October 1999	2 December 2010	11 years, 43 days	
52	Robert Clark MP	Liberal	2 December 2010	4 December 2014	4 years, 2 days	
53	Martin Pakula MP	Labor	4 December 2014	29 November 2018	3 years, 360 days	
54	Jill Hennessy MP	Labor	29 November 2018	16 December 2020	2 years, 17 days	
55	Jaclyn Symes MLC	Labor	22 December 2020	19 December 2024	3 years, 363 days	
56	Sonya Kilkenny MP	Labor	19 December 2024	Incumbent	1 year, 262 days	

== See also ==
- Justice ministry
- Politics of Victoria
