= Vicki Ward =

Australian politician (born 1969)

The Honourable Vicki Ward MP

Minister for Public Transport
- Incumbent
- Assumed office 4 August 2026
- Premier: Ben Carroll
- Preceded by: Gabrielle Williams (as Minister for Public and Active Transport)

Minister for Creative Industries
- Incumbent
- Assumed office 21 April 2026
- Premier: Jacinta Allan; Ben Carroll
- Preceded by: Colin Brooks
Other ministerial offices
Minister for Equality
In office 19 December 2024 – 4 August 2026
Premier	Jacinta Allan
Preceded by	Harriet Shing
Succeeded by	Steve Dimopoulos
Minister for Natural Disaster Recovery
In office 19 December 2024 – 4 August 2026
Premier	Jacinta Allan
Preceded by	Position established
Succeeded by	Position abolished
Minister for Emergency Services
In office 19 December 2024 – 4 August 2026
Premier	Jacinta Allan
Preceded by	Jaclyn Symes
Succeeded by	Paul Edbrooke
Minister for Prevention of Family Violence
In office 2 October 2023 – 19 December 2024
Premier	Jacinta Allan
Preceded by	Ros Spence
Succeeded by	Natalie Hutchins
Minister for Employment
In office 2 October 2023 – 19 December 2024
Premier	Jacinta Allan
Preceded by	Ben Carroll
Succeeded by	Natalie Suleyman (as Minister for Small Business and Employment)
Parliamentary secretary roles
Parliamentary Secretary for Education
In office 5 December 2022 – 2 October 2023
Minister	Natalie Hutchins
Premier	Daniel AndrewsJacinta Allan
Preceded by	Tim Richardson (as Parliamentary Secretary for Schools)
Succeeded by	Darren Cheeseman
Parliamentary Secretary for Transport
In office 27 June 2022 – 5 December 2022
Minister	Jacinta Allan
Premier	Daniel Andrews
Preceded by	Herself (as Parliamentary Secretary for Public Transport and Infrastructure)
Succeeded by	Josh Bull

Member of the Victorian Legislative Assembly for Eltham
- Incumbent
- Assumed office 29 November 2014
- Preceded by: Steve Herbert

Personal details
- Born: 30 June 1969 (age 57) Melbourne, Victoria, Australia
- Party: Labor Party
- Education: La Trobe University
- Occupation: Politician
- Website: www.vickiward.com.au

Vicki Ward (born 30 June 1969) is an Australian politician. She has been a Labor Party member of the Victorian Legislative Assembly since November 2014, representing the Legislative Assembly seat of Eltham. She was Minister for Natural Disaster Recovery, Minister for Emergency Services, and Minister for Equality from December 2024 until August 2026. She has been Minister for Creative Industries since April 2026 and Minister for Public Transport since August 2026.

From 1998 to 2014, she was an advisor and electorate officer to federal Labor MP Jenny Macklin.

Victorian Legislative Assembly
Preceded by Steve Herbert	Member for Eltham; 2014–present	Incumbent
