= Sonya Kilkenny =

Australian politician

The Honourable Sonya Kilkenny MP
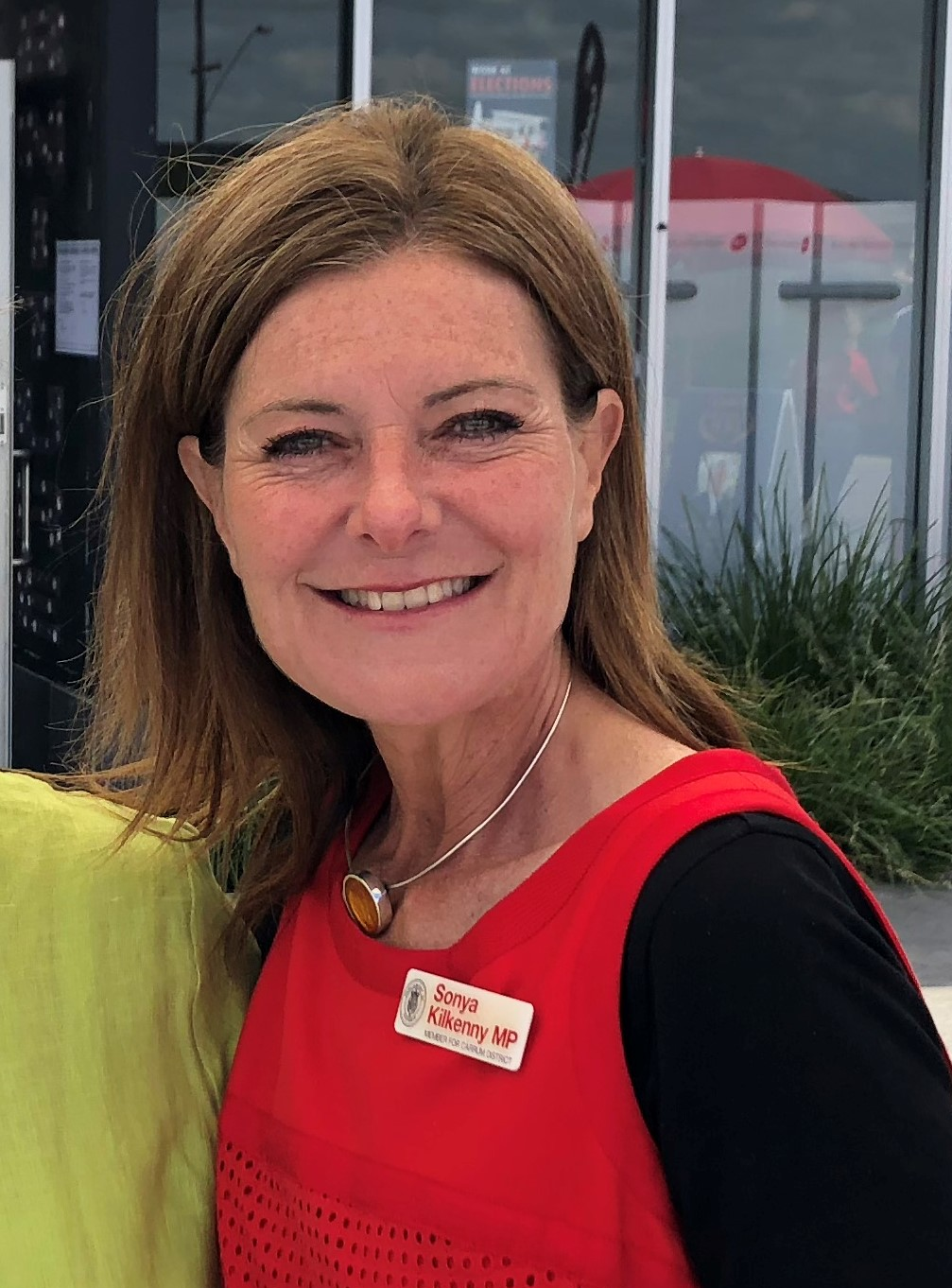
- Kilkenny in 2018

56th Attorney-General of Victoria
- Incumbent
- Assumed office 19 December 2024
- Premier: Jacinta Allan; Ben Carroll
- Preceded by: Jaclyn Symes

Minister for Planning
- Incumbent
- Assumed office 5 December 2022
- Premier: Daniel Andrews; Jacinta Allan; Ben Carroll
- Preceded by: Lizzie Blandthorn

Minister for Prevention of Family Violence
- Incumbent
- Assumed office 4 August 2026
- Premier: Ben Carroll
- Preceded by: Melissa Horne
Other ministerial offices
Minister for Finance
In office 15 April 2026 – 4 August 2026
Premier	Jacinta Allan
Preceded by	Danny Pearson
Succeeded by	Enver Erdogan
Minister for Violence Reduction
In office 15 April 2026 – 4 August 2026
Premier	Jacinta Allan
Preceded by	Position established
Succeeded by	Position abolished
Minister for the Suburbs
In office 2 October 2023 – 19 December 2024
Premier	Jacinta Allan
Preceded by	Ros Spence (as Minister for Suburban Development)
Succeeded by	Position abolished
Minister for Outdoor Recreation
In office 5 December 2022 – 2 October 2023
Premier	Daniel Andrews; Jacinta Allan
Preceded by	Herself (as Minister for Fishing and Boating)
Succeeded by	Steve Dimopoulos
Minister for Youth JusticeMinister for CorrectionsMinister for Victim Support
In office 4 July 2022 – 5 December 2022
Premier	Daniel Andrews
Preceded by	Natalie Hutchins
Succeeded by	Enver Erdogan
Minister for Fishing and Boating
In office 4 July 2022 – 5 December 2022
Premier	Daniel Andrews
Preceded by	Melissa Horne
Succeeded by	Herself (as Minister for Outdoor Recreation)

Member of the Victorian Legislative Assembly for Carrum
- Incumbent
- Assumed office 29 November 2014
- Preceded by: Donna Bauer

Personal details
- Born: 15 May 1969 (age 57) Sydney, Australia
- Party: Labor
- Children: 1
- Education: University of New South Wales; University of Melbourne
- Profession: Commercial lawyer

Sonya Kilkenny (born 15 May 1969) is an Australian politician. She has been a Labor Party member of the Victorian Legislative Assembly since November 2014, representing the Electoral district of Carrum.

== Early life and legal career ==
Kilkenny was born in Sydney, and attended schools in Hong Kong and the United States before returning to Australia. She graduated from the University of New South Wales with a Bachelor of Arts and Bachelor of Laws, and later with a Master of Laws from the University of Melbourne. She has worked as a legal officer or lawyer for organisations such as the Kimberley Land Council and the Australian Children's Television Foundation, and served on the boards of the Back to Back Theatre company and the National Theatre in St Kilda. Just prior to her election, she was head of the legal dispute resolution team at the ANZ Banking Group.

Kilkenny lives in her electorate of Carrum.

== Politics ==
Kilkenny contested the federal Division of Dunkley for Labor at the 2013 federal election, losing to incumbent Liberal Member Bruce Billson.

Kilkenny first entered parliament at the 2014 Victorian state election when she narrowly won the seat off the Liberal incumbent, before holding the seat at the 2018 Victorian state election with an 11.2 per cent swing, one of the biggest swings in the election.

Kilkenny served on the Scrutiny of Acts and Regulations Committee and was an Acting Speaker in the Legislative Assembly.

On 29 November 2018, Kilkenny was appointed Parliamentary Secretary for Early Childhood Education and in 2020 appointed Cabinet Secretary.

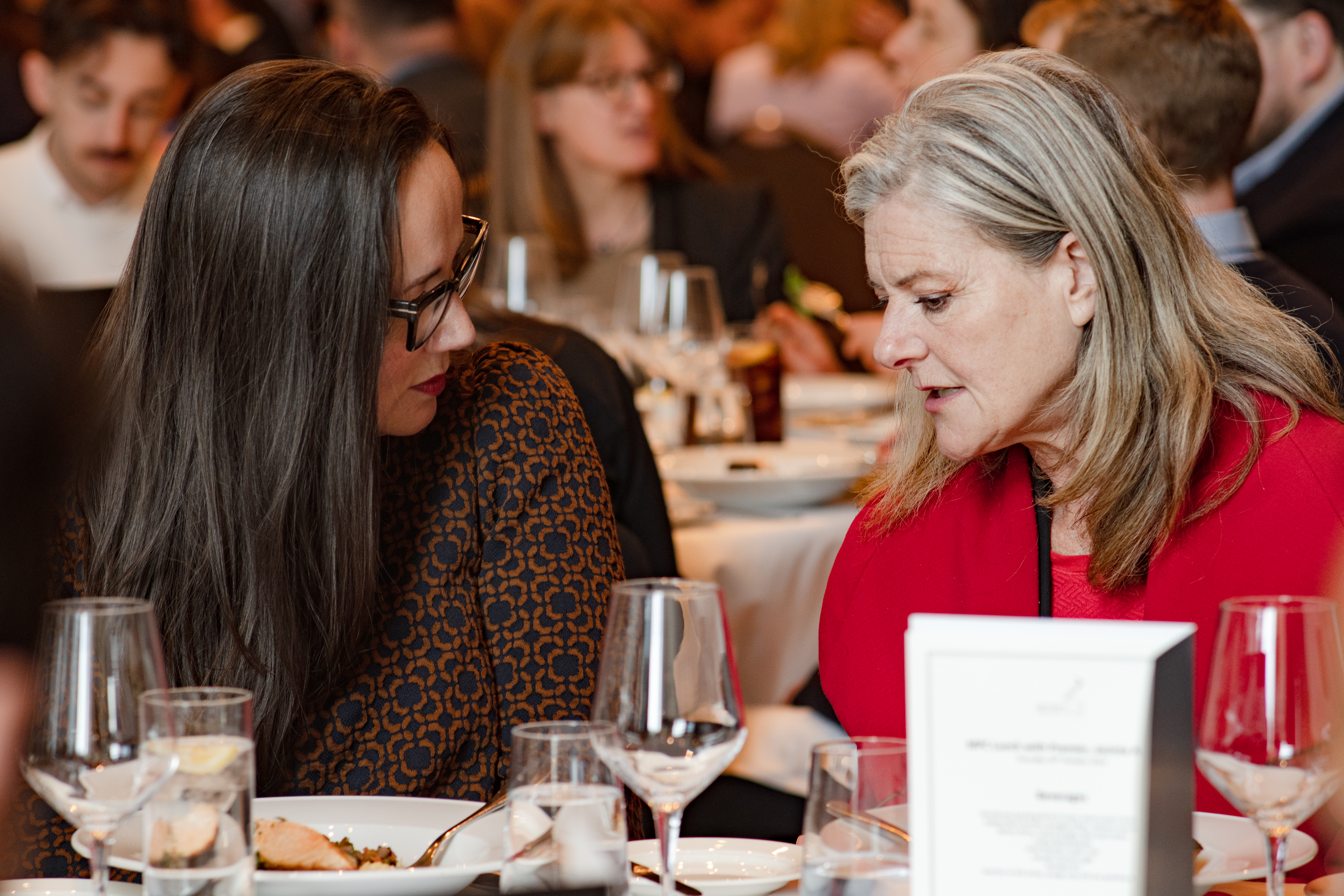
Kilkenny (right) talks with Minister for Housing Harriet Shing at a Melbourne Press Club event in October 2024

Kilkenny was appointed as Minister for Corrections, Minister for Youth Justice, Minister for Victim Support and Minister for Fishing and Boating as part of a June 2022 cabinet reshuffle. She was sworn in on 4 July, a week after the rest of the cabinet, due to isolating after contracting COVID-19.

After holding her seat at the 2022 Victorian state election Kilkenny was sworn in as the Minister for Planning and the Minister for Outdoor Recreation in December 2022.

In October 2023, Kilkenny was appointed as Minister for the Suburbs, in addition to continuing as Planning Minister.

In December 2024, Kilkenny was sworn in as the 56th Attorney-General of Victoria, in addition to continuing as Minister for Planning.

Victorian Legislative Assembly
Preceded by Donna Bauer	Member for Carrum; 2014–present	Incumbent
Political offices
Preceded by Natalie Hutchins	Minister for Corrections; Minister for Youth Justice; Minister for Victim Support; 2022–present	Incumbent
Preceded by Melissa Horne	Minister for Fishing and Boating; 2022–present	Incumbent
