= List of Victorian government agencies =

The agencies of the Government of Victoria in Australia are collectively described as the Victorian public sector. By convention, and similarly to other jurisdictions with Westminster systems of government, the public sector is organised into the public service and public entities. The public sector is also collectively known as the machinery of government. In Victoria, the public sector is defined by the Public Administration Act 2004.

The Victorian public service is composed of ten departments, the head of each being a secretary. Each department can consist of a number of portfolios, each of which is the direct responsibility of a minister, who collectively form the ministry. A number of other bodies perform specific roles within the public service. For example, the Victorian Public Sector Commission oversees and reports on the public sector as a whole; Administrative Offices are established in relation to departments and undertake clearly defined tasks while reporting directly to the secretary and the responsible Minister; and various other bodies which are described in legislation as public service employers.

Public entities are formed in various ways: they may be statutory authorities, formed by legislative instruments which define their role and purpose; state-owned enterprises with a commercial purpose; or other advisory bodies performing a public function. Public entities are granted varying degrees of autonomy but are ultimately responsible to the relevant minister. For that purpose, each is assigned to the portfolio of the department supporting the minister. Departments, therefore, are responsible for both the public service bodies and public entities which fall within their purview.

Transfers of responsibility between public sector bodies, and the creation or abolition of these bodies, are known as machinery of government changes. The Public Administration Act provides the mechanisms by which such changes are made.

== Education ==
- Department of Education

=== Public entities ===
- Centre for Adult Education
- Victorian Institute of Teaching
- The over 1,500 councils of schools in the state school system are considered individual public entities responsible to the department. Similarly, permanent and casual relief teachers in state schools are employed by the Teaching Service, which although a component of the department is not a public service employer.

== Energy, Environment and Climate Action ==
- Department of Energy, Environment and Climate Action

=== Public service ===
- Office of the Commissioner for Environmental Sustainability
- Sustainability Victoria
- VicGrid

=== Public entities ===
- Agriculture Victoria Services Pty Ltd
- Alpine Resorts Victoria
- Barwon Asset Solutions Pty Ltd
- Dairy Food Safety Victoria
- Energy Safe Victoria (Victorian Energy Safety Commission)
- Environment Protection Authority
- Great Ocean Road Coast and Parks Authority
- Melbourne Market Authority
- Parks Victoria
- Phillip Island Nature Park Board of Management
- PrimeSafe
- Royal Botanic Gardens Board
- State Electricity Commission
- Trust for Nature (Victoria)
- Veterinary Practitioners Registration Board
- Victorian Environmental Water Holder
- Working Heritage Incorporated
- Zoological Parks and Gardens Board
- Catchment management authorities
  - Corangamite Catchment Management Authority
  - East Gippsland Catchment Management Authority
  - Glenelg Hopkins Catchment Management Authority
  - Goulburn Broken Catchment Management Authority
  - Mallee Catchment Management Authority
  - North Central Catchment Management Authority
  - North East Catchment Management Authority
  - West Gippsland Catchment Management Authority
  - Wimmera Catchment Management Authority
- Coastal management committees
  - Barwon Coast Committee of Management
  - Bellarine Bayside Foreshore Committee of Management Inc
  - Capel Sound Foreshore Committee of Management Inc
  - Point Leo Foreshore and Public Parks Reserves Committee of Management Inc
- Water corporations
  - Barwon Region Water Corporation
  - Central Gippsland Region Water Corporation
  - Central Highlands Region Water Corporation
  - Coliban Region Water Corporation
  - East Gippsland Region Water Corporation
  - Gippsland and Southern Rural Water Corporation
  - Goulburn Valley Region Water Corporation
  - Goulburn–Murray Rural Water Corporation
  - Grampians Wimmera Mallee Water Corporation
  - Greater Western Water
  - Lower Murray Urban and Rural Water Corporation
  - Melbourne Water Corporation
  - North East Region Water Corporation
  - South East Water Corporation
  - South Gippsland Region Water Corporation
  - Wannon Region Water Corporation
  - Westernport Region Water Corporation
  - Yarra Valley Water Corporation

== Families, Fairness and Housing ==
- Department of Families, Fairness and Housing

=== Public service ===
- Commission for Children and Young People
- Family Safety Victoria
- Victorian Disability Worker Commission

=== Public entities ===
- Family Violence Prevention Agency (Respect Victoria)
- Office of the Social Services Regulator
- Queen Victoria Women's Centre Trust
- Shrine of Remembrance Trust

== Government Services ==
- Department of Government Services

=== Public service ===
- Public Record Office Victoria

=== Public entities ===
- CenITex

== Health ==
- Department of Health

=== Public service ===
- Mental Health and Wellbeing Commission
- Safer Care Victoria
- Victorian Agency for Health Information

=== Public entities ===
All public hospitals in Victoria are operated by boards responsible to the Department of Health. For a list of hospitals, see List of hospitals in Australia § Victoria

- Ambulance Victoria
- Ballarat General Cemeteries Trust
- BreastScreen Victoria
- Geelong Cemeteries Trust
- Greater Metropolitan Cemeteries Trust
- Health Purchasing Victoria
- Remembrance Park Central Victoria
- Southern Metropolitan Cemeteries Trust
- Victorian Assisted Reproductive Treatment Authority
- Victorian Collaborative Centre for Mental Health and Wellbeing
- Victorian Health Promotion Foundation (VicHealth)
- Victorian Institute of Forensic Mental Health
- Victorian Pharmacy Authority

== Jobs, Skills, Industry and Regions ==
- Department of Jobs, Skills, Industry and Regions

=== Public service ===
- Victorian Skills Authority

=== Public entities ===
- AMES Australia
- Australian Centre for the Moving Image
- Australian Grand Prix Corporation
- Bendigo Kangan Institute
- Box Hill Institute
- Breakthrough Victoria Pty Ltd
- Chisholm Institute
- Docklands Studios Melbourne
- Federation Square Pty Ltd
- Film Victoria
- Game Management Authority
- Geelong Performing Arts Centre Trust
- Gippsland Institute of TAFE
- Gordon Institute of TAFE
- Goulburn Ovens Institute of TAFE
- Holmesglen Institute
- Kardinia Park Stadium Trust
- Launch Victoria
- Melbourne and Olympic Parks Trust
- Melbourne Arts Precinct Corporation
- Melbourne Convention Bureau
- Melbourne Polytechnic
- Melbourne Recital Centre
- Museum Victoria
- National Gallery of Victoria
- Puffing Billy Railway Board
- South West Institute of TAFE
- State Library of Victoria
- State Sport Centres Trust
- Sunraysia Institute of TAFE
- The Wheeler Centre
- VET Development Centre
- Victorian Arts Centre Trust
- Victorian Convention and Event Trust
- Victorian Fisheries Authority
- Victorian Institute of Sport
- Visit Victoria
- William Angliss Institute of TAFE
- Wodonga Institute of TAFE

== Justice and Community Safety ==
- Department of Justice and Community Safety

=== Public service ===
- Births, Deaths and Marriages (Victorian Registry of)
- Court Services Victoria
- Local Government Inspectorate
- Office of Public Prosecutions
- Office of the Legal Services Commissioner
- Office of the Road Safety Camera Commissioner
- Office of the Victorian Information Commissioner
- Victoria Police (support staff only)
- Victorian Equal Opportunity and Human Rights Commission (excluding Commissioner)
- Victorian Gambling and Casino Control Commission (excluding CEO)
- Victorian Government Solicitor's Office
- Victorian Liquor Commission (Liquor Control Victoria)

=== Public entities ===
- Country Fire Authority
- Fire Rescue Victoria
- Greyhound Racing Victoria
- Harness Racing Victoria
- Legal Practitioners Liability Committee
- Triple Zero Victoria
- Victoria Legal Aid
- Victoria Police (sworn police and protective services officers)
- Victoria State Emergency Service
- Victorian Institute of Forensic Medicine
- Victorian Law Foundation

== Premier and Cabinet ==
- Department of Premier and Cabinet

=== Public service ===
- Office of the Chief Parliamentary Counsel
- Office of the Governor
- Office of the Victorian Electoral Commission
- Victorian Public Sector Commission

=== Public entities ===
- VITS LanguageLink

== Transport and Planning ==
- Department of Transport and Planning

=== Public service ===
- Chief Investigator, Transport Safety
- Cladding Safety Victoria
- Office of the Victorian Government Architect
- Safe Transport Victoria
- Suburban Rail Loop Authority
- Victorian Infrastructure Delivery Authority
  - Level Crossing Removal Project
  - Major Road Projects Victoria
    - North East Link Project
    - West Gate Tunnel Project
  - Metro Tunnel Project
  - Victorian Health Building Authority
- Victorian Planning Authority

=== Public entities ===
- Architects Registration Board of Victoria
- Building and Plumbing Commission (Victorian Building Authority)
- Development Victoria
- Gippsland Ports Committee of Management
- North East Link State Tolling Corporation
- Port of Hastings Corporation
- Ports Victoria
- V/Line Corporation
- Victorian Rail Track Corporation

== Treasury and Finance ==
- Department of Treasury and Finance

=== Public service ===
- Commission for Better Regulation
- Emergency Services Superannuation Board
- Essential Services Commission
- Infrastructure Victoria
- Labour Hire Licensing Authority
- Portable Long Service Benefits Authority
- Office of Projects Victoria
- State Revenue Office
- Wage Inspectorate Victoria

=== Public entities ===
- Accident Compensation Conciliation Service (Workplace Injury Commission)
- Old Treasury Building Reserve Committee
- State Trustees Limited
- Transport Accident Commission
- Treasury Corporation of Victoria
- Victorian Asbestos Eradication Agency
- Victorian Funds Management Corporation
- Victorian Managed Insurance Authority
- Victorian WorkCover Authority (WorkSafe)

== Non-executive agencies ==
A small number of agencies are constitutionally or statutorily independent of the government and are directly responsible to the Parliament of Victoria and its officers.

- Departments of the Parliament
  - Department of Parliamentary Services
  - Department of the Legislative Council
  - Department of the Legislative Assembly
- Independent Broad-based Anti-corruption Commission
- Integrity Oversight Victoria
- Office of the Ombudsman Victoria
- Parliamentary Workplace Standards and Integrity Commission
- Parliamentary Budget Office of Victoria
- Victorian Auditor-General's Office
- Sentencing Advisory Council
