= Emergency Management Victoria =

Agency overview
- Formed: 1 July 2014
- Type: Statutory authority
- Jurisdiction: Victoria, Australia
- Headquarters: 8 Nicholson Street, East Melbourne, Victoria
- Minister responsible: Vicki Ward, Minister for Emergency Services.
- Agency executives: Tim Wiebusch ESM, Emergency Management Commissioner; Jenni Rigby, Chief Executive
- Parent department: Department of Justice and Community Safety
- Website: www.emv.vic.gov.au

Emergency Management Victoria (EMV) is a state government statutory authority responsible for leading emergency management in Victoria, Australia by working with communities, government, agencies and business to strengthen their capacity to withstand, plan for, respond to and recover from emergencies.

Established in July 2014, Emergency Management Victoria plays a key role in implementing the Victorian Government’s emergency management agenda.

== Role and responsibilities ==
Emergency Management Victoria's role and responsibilities include:

- maximising the ability of the emergency management sector to work together and achieve joined up outcomes that are community focused
- facilitating key initiatives focused on system-wide reform with integrated policy, strategy, planning, investment and procurement
- ensuring a stronger emphasis on shared responsibility, community resilience, consequence management and post emergency recovery activities
- embedding emergency management across government, agencies and business
- leading and coordinating emergency preparedness, response and recovery with the emergency management sector and community

EMV supports the Emergency Management Commissioner, who has overall responsibility for coordination before, during and after major emergencies including management of consequences of an emergency.

EMV is an integral part of the emergency management sector and shares responsibility with a range of agencies, organisations and departments for ensuring the system of emergency management in Victoria is sustainable, effective and community focussed. Other government departments and agencies involved with emergency management include the Department of Energy, Environment and Climate Action, the Department of Premier and Cabinet, Health and Human Services, Ambulance Victoria and Victoria Police.

== Management and reporting ==
The Emergency Management Commissioner is Tim Wiebusch ESM.

The Chief Executive responsible for the day-to-day management of Emergency Management Victoria is Jenni Rigby.

The Minister responsible is Vicki Ward, Minister for Emergency Services.

=== Commissioners ===
The following individuals have served as Emergency Management Commissioners:

Ordinal	Name	Title	Term start	Term end	Time in office	Notes
1	Craig Lapsley	Commissioner	1 July 2014	7 August 2018	4 years, 37 days	
2	Andrew Crisp AM APM	Commissioner	13 August 2018	4 August 2023	7 years, 360 days	
3	Rick Nugent APM	Commissioner	11 September 2023	18 February 2025	2 years, 331 days	
4	Tim Wiebusch ESM	Commissioner	17 June 2025	incumbent	1 year, 52 days	

== Facilities ==
EMV operates out of several locations including the Southern Cross Tower, State Control Centre (SCC), and the Victorian Emergency Management Institute (VEMI).

There are also eight Victorian Emergency Management Training Centres (VEMTC) around Victoria that carry EMV branding, however these are operated by the Country Fire Authority.

A ninth VEMTC existed in Craigieburn and was managed by the now abolished Metropolitan Fire Brigade, however this was rebranded as the Fire Rescue Victoria Training Academy with the formation of Fire Rescue Victoria in 2020, and EMV branding was removed.
