= Department of Government Services =

Department of Government Services may refer to:

- Department of Government Services (New Brunswick)
- Department of Government Services (Victoria)
