= Dudley Mansion =

Dudley Mansion may refer to:

- Dudley Mansion, the Wilmington home of Edward Bishop Dudley, 28th Governor of North Carolina
- Dudley mansion, an improvised shack in the Dudley Flats locality, Melbourne, Australia
