= Victorian Emergency Management Training Centre =

The Victorian Emergency Management Training Centres are multi-agency training grounds located in Victoria. They are primarily used for training emergency service personnel.

== Locations ==
There are eight centres, generally located in regional areas. Currently all centres are owned by the Victorian Government and operated by the Country Fire Authority (CFA), however are available for all emergency services to utilise. They are cobranded as CFA and Emergency Management Victoria (EMV) sites.

Victorian Emergency Management Training Centres are located at:

- Bangholme
- Central Highlands
- Huntly
- Longerenong
- Penshurst
- Sunrasia
- Wangaratta
- West Sale

A ninth centre existed in Craigieburn and was managed by the now abolished Metropolitan Fire Brigade, however this was rebranded as the Fire Rescue Victoria Training Academy with the formation of Fire Rescue Victoria in 2020.

== Training ==
Each centre offers a range of training facilities.

List of training facilities by location
	Bangholme	Central Highlands	Huntly	Longerenong	Penshurst	Sunrasia	Wangaratta	West Sale
Aircraft fire				✓	✓	✓		
Breathing apparatus		✓	✓			✓	✓	
Bushfire			✓			✓		
Car fire			✓		✓	✓	✓	✓
Confined space rescue	✓		✓		✓			
Mine			✓					
Domestic apartment	✓							
Draughting pit	✓	✓		✓	✓			
Fire extinguishers	✓			✓	✓	✓	✓	✓
Fire attack building	✓		✓		✓	✓		
Fire investigations			✓					
Flammable liquid	✓	✓	✓	✓	✓			
Forcable entry	✓	✓	✓	✓	✓	✓	✓	✓
Gas / LPG	✓	✓	✓	✓	✓	✓	✓	✓
HAZMAT	✓	✓	✓	✓	✓	✓	✓	✓
Lightning Strike				✓			✓	
Low voltage fuse removal	✓	✓	✓	✓		✓	✓	✓
Marine fire					✓			
Off-road driving		✓	✓	✓				✓
On road driving		✓						
Pole top fire		✓		✓	✓	✓	✓	
Road crash rescue	✓		✓	✓	✓		✓	✓
Salvage				✓			✓	
Search and rescue		✓				✓		✓
Service station fire		✓		✓	✓	✓		
Shed fire			✓			✓		✓
Skip fire				✓	✓	✓	✓	✓
Solar panel fire		✓		✓	✓	✓		
Structure collapse					✓			
Safe working at heights	✓	✓	✓	✓	✓	✓		✓
Trench rescue	✓							
Truck fire						✓		✓
Tunnels			✓				✓	
Urban search and rescue	✓							
Ventilation							✓	
