= Frank Heath =

Frank Heath may refer to:

- Sir Frank Heath (educationist) (1863–1946), British educationist and civil servant
- Frank Heath (architect) (1907–1980), Australian architect and town planner
