= Park Towers (South Melbourne) =

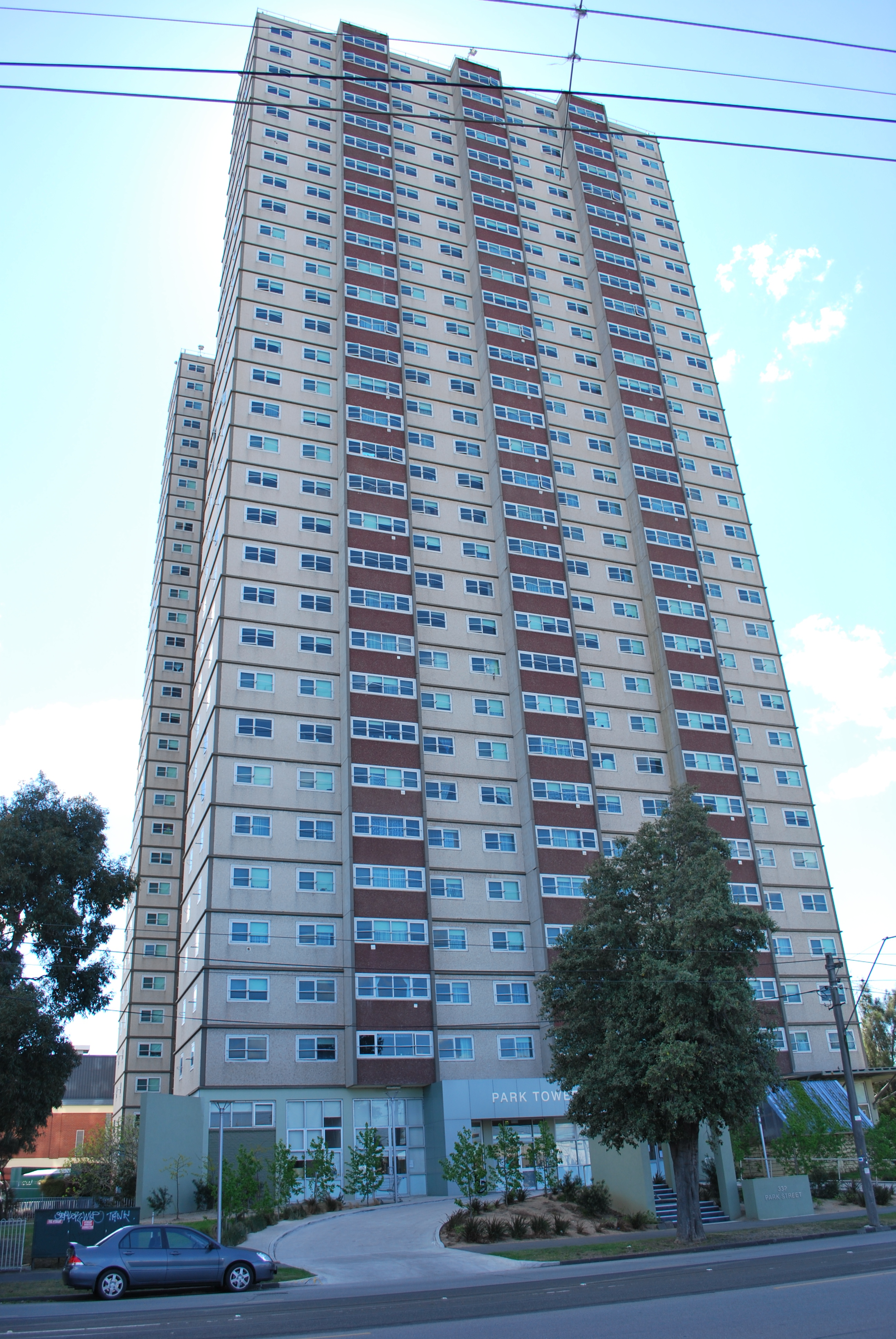
- Park Towers in 2011
- Interactive map of the Park Towers area

General information
- Status: Completed
- Type: Residential
- Location: South Melbourne, 332 Park St, Melbourne, Australia
- Coordinates: 37.8357°S 144.9577°E
- Construction started: 1967
- Completed: 1969
- Demolished: By 2051 (Proposed)
- Cost: $4,900,000 AUD
- Owner: Homes Victoria
- Affiliation: Department of Families, Fairness and Housing

Height
- Height: 92 m (302 ft)

Technical details
- Floor count: 31
- Lifts/elevators: 3

Design and construction
- Architect: Roy Prentice
- Architecture firm: Housing Commission of Victoria

Other information
- Number of units: 299

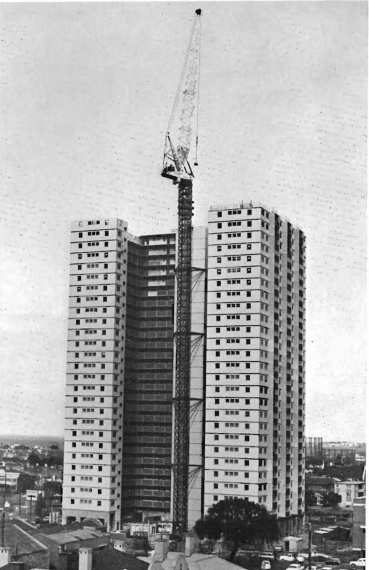
Park Towers in South Melbourne being built in 1967-68

Park Towers is a 31-storey public housing tower in South Melbourne, Victoria built 1967–69. It is historically and architecturally the most significant of the 47 public housing towers in Victoria. At the time of its completion in 1969, the building was believed to be the tallest pre-cast load-bearing wall building in the world and had more storeys than any other building in Melbourne. It attracted international attention from architects in America, Italy, England and the USSR, and was published in several overseas sources including the RIBA Journal in January 1971. The City of South Melbourne also gave it a special award, as the best residential building erected in the municipality that year.

Park Towers has 299 properties and is entirely owned and managed by Homes Victoria, a government agency that sits within Department of Families, Fairness and Housing. In recent times, residents of the building have raised concerns with the increase in crime and drug use within the building as well as poor maintenance. Park Towers is one of Melbourne's 44 Public Housing Towers scheduled to be demolished by 2051.

== History and Construction ==
Park Towers was designed by Housing Commission of Victoria Chief Architect, Roy Prentice in 1967 and built by its construction division, the Concrete House Project at the Holmesglen Housing Factory in Malvern East. The buildings colours, red and white, reflected the suburb's local football team the South Melbourne Swans.
