= Department of Jobs, Skills, Industry and Regions =

Victorian government department 2023-

Department overview
- Formed: 1 January 2023
- Preceding agencies: Department of Jobs, Precincts and Regions; Department of Education and Training
- Jurisdiction: Victoria, Australia
- Minister responsible: See Ministers list below
- Department executive: Matt Carrick, Secretary
- Website: djsir.vic.gov.au

The Department of Jobs, Skills, Industry and Regions (DJSIR) is a department in the state of Victoria, Australia. Commencing operation on 1 January 2023, it was created in machinery of government changes following the return of the Labor government led by Premier Daniel Andrews at the 2022 state election, in which the department was renamed from the Department of Jobs, Precincts and Regions.

The DJSIR supports nine ministers across 15 portfolios, broadly related to economic development. It has the same responsibilities as the previous Department of Jobs, Precincts and Regions, with the exception of resources and agriculture which were transferred to the Department of Energy, Environment and Climate Action and local government which was transferred to Department of Government Services. Responsibilities for TAFE, skills, training and higher education were also transferred from the Department of Education and Training to the new department.

== Ministers ==
As of October 2023, the DJSIR supports nine ministers in the following portfolios:

Name	Party	Portfolio
Ben Carroll	Labor	Minister for Medical Research
Gayle Tierney	Labor	Minister for Skills and TAFE; Minister for Regional Development
Tim Pallas	Labor	Minister for Economic Growth
Steve Dimopoulos	Labor	Minister for Tourism, Sport and Major Events; Minister for Outdoor Recreation
Ros Spence	Labor	Minister for Community Sport
Colin Brooks	Labor	Minister for Creative Industries
Vicki Ward	Labor	Minister for Employment
Natalie Suleyman	Labor	Minister for Small Business
Natalie Hutchins	Labor	Minister for Jobs and Industry; DJSIR Coordinating Minister

== Structure ==
The DJSIR is divided into seven streams:

- Industry and innovation
- Employment and small business
- Regional and suburban development
- Training, skills and higher education
- Sport, tourism and events
- Strategy and priority events
- Corporate services

== Functions ==
The DJSIR has responsibility for the following policy areas:

- Economic development
- Industry
- Creative industries
- Employment
- Major events and tourism
- Industrial relations
- Regional development
- Small business
- Racing
- Sport and recreation
- Suburban development
- Trade and investment
- Vocational education and training
- Higher education
- Provider registration and qualifications
