= Garden City, Victoria =

Garden City Melbourne, Victoria
- Coordinates: 37.8362°S 144.9199°E
- Postcode(s): 3207
- Location: 5 km (3 mi) from Melbourne
- LGA(s): City of Port Phillip

Garden City is a residential area of Melbourne located in the most westerly part of Port Melbourne, 5km south-west of the Melbourne CBD, generally bounded by what is now Williamstown Road, Howe Parade, and Walter Street. It was the first housing estate created by a public authority in Victoria, developed in stages by the State Bank of Victoria between 1926 and 1948.

The name is sometimes also applied to the adjacent estate built by the Housing Commission of Victoria in 1938-1942, one of their first projects.

The area, between the bay and the lower reach of the Yarra River, originally consisted of low lying marshy undeveloped land. As early as the 1850s some fisherman lived in huts near the river, and the area became known as Fishermen's Bend. When the river was regularised by the construction of the Coode Canal in 1884-6, the excavated silt was used for land reclamation in this area. The northern part later hosted various industries and shipping functions, while the southern part beyond Princes Pier remained undeveloped.

As part of a growing concern with overcrowded 'slum' housing stock in older suburbs before WWI, the State Government encouraged local Councils to build social housing, and in 1912, the former City of Port Melbourne planned a scheme in the Montague district, which never eventuated. After WWI they then lobbied the State Government to provide social housing on the unused land at Fishermen's Bend, but the Melbourne Harbor Trust resisted. The state government controlled State Savings Bank then took up the Council proposal, and purchased 10 acres in 1926, another 20 acres in 1927, and a further 14 acres in 1928, bounded by Williamstown Road, Howe Parade, and Walter Street.

This was to be the first housing estate created by a public authority in Victoria, intended to provide higher standard housing at affordable prices for families from deprived areas. The entire project was managed by the Bank, which laid out the estate, built the houses, and provided loans, with purchasers expected to pay them off within about 20 years, and not allowed to sell for the first two.

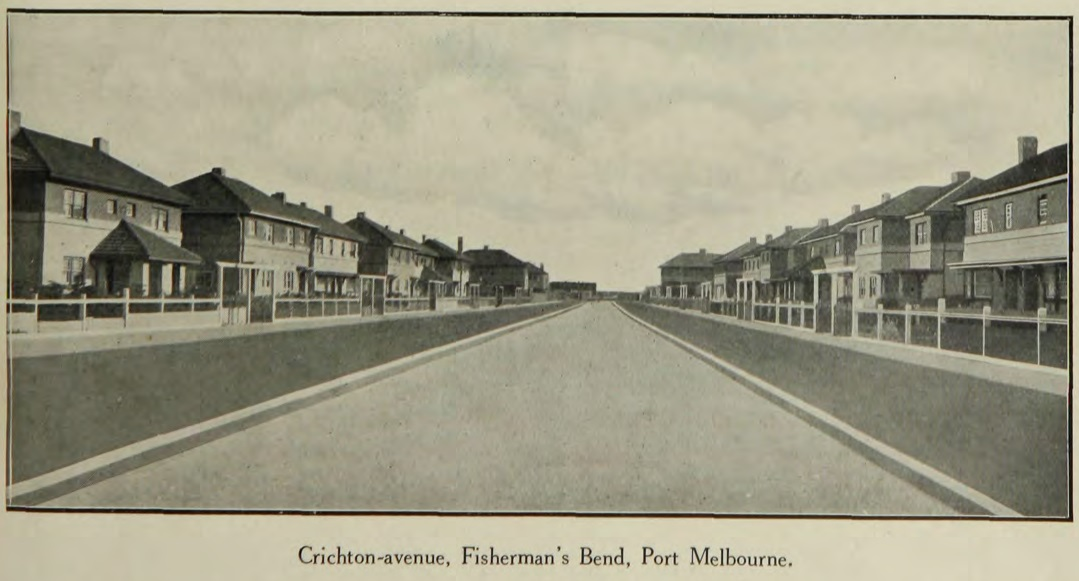
Crighton Avenue, Garden City, 1929

Though named in 1929 after the early 20th century British Garden City movement, the planning of this first stage was more directly influenced by the British Manual on the Preparation of State-Aided Housing Schemes (1919), which recommended curving rather than grid iron streets, in a suburban format with front and rear gardens, and reserves. The Manual also recommend the use of semi-detached two-storey houses, a format that became very popular across Britain in the interwar period, used here extensively for the first time. The State Bank houses, designed by locals Henderson and Haddow, closely followed the simple styling and cubic form of the Manual, creating homes with efficient layouts on relatively small plots compared to typical suburban housing in Melbourne in the 1920s. They were built of 'cindcrete' concrete blocks covered in roughcast, in a boxy unadorned format with six slight variations, giving the estate a very British character. The first stage east of Tucker Avenue was completed by 1929, with the remainder to the west not commenced until 1937, and the last of the 322 houses not completed until 1948.

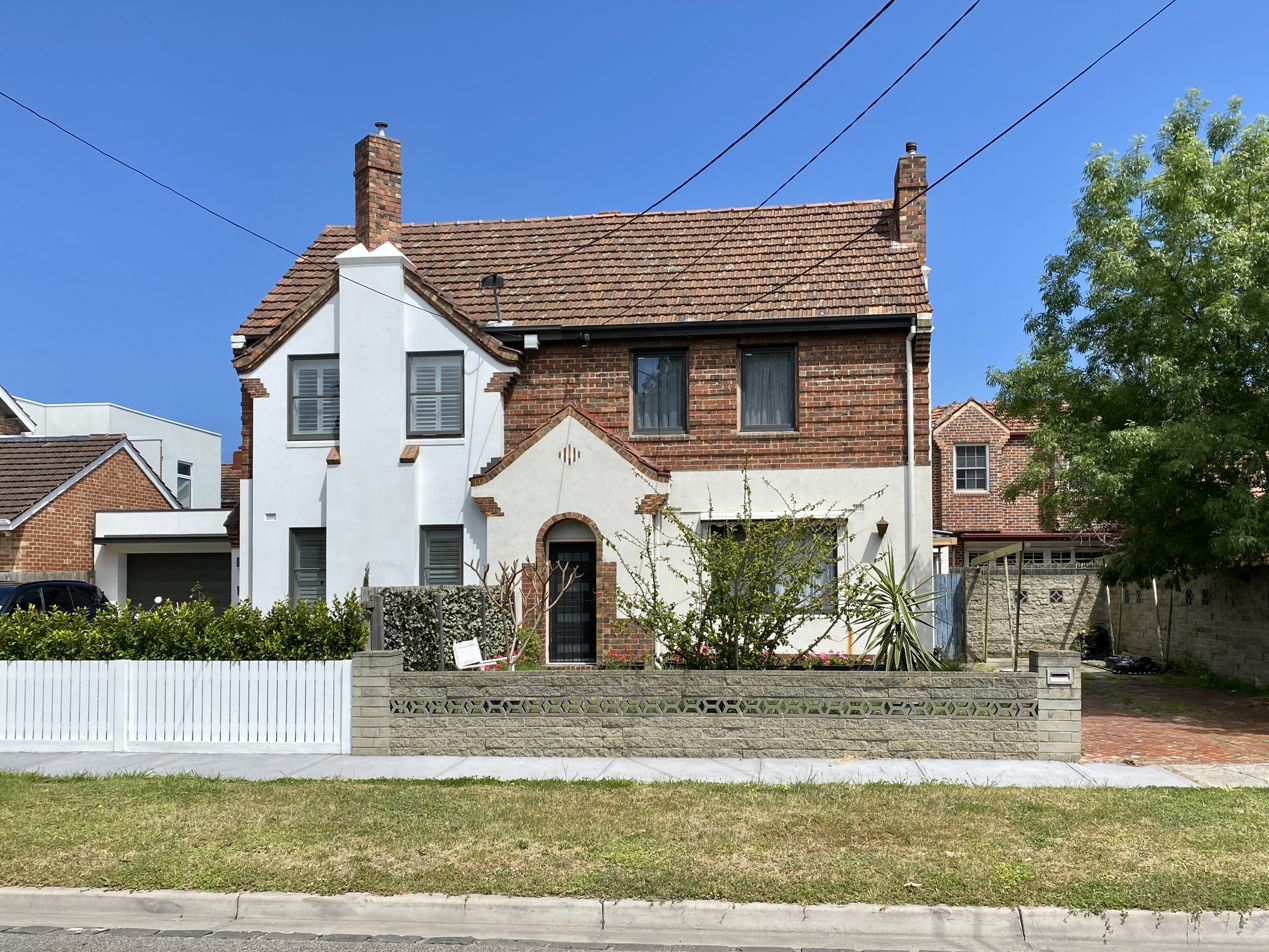
Dunstan Estate, Old English style, 2024

While the Garden City 'Bank Estate' was underway, two more estates were built next door by other government agencies, and are sometimes also said to be Garden City houses.

In 1936 the State Government directly undertook the construction of a small estate of 46 houses to be rented to families at moderate rates, completed in early 1937. They were laid out on two new small streets, Griffin Crescent and Southward Avenue, just to the east of the Bank Estate houses. They were again semi-detached, but in a range of styles, such as Tudor and Georgian, all designed by Percy Everett, Chief Architect of the Public Works Department, and are mostly set on an angle to the street to further avoid any monotony. This is now called the Dunstan Estate after the Premier of the day Albert Dunstan who initiated the project, and represents the first Government built social housing in Victoria.

The Housing Commission of Victoria (HCV) was established in 1938 in order to build large numbers of government housing for rent to lower income families, and immediately acquired a further 22 hectares to the west and south of the Bank estate, when the area was still known as Fishermen's Bend. A competition was held for the design of the houses and for the layout, but rather than employ the winners, in May 1939 a panel comprising architects John Scarborough as Chairman, Arthur Leith, Frank Heath and Best Overend were appointed who developed a range of standard dwelling types, and a final layout; this was based on the winning plan by Saxil Tuxen, which was more inspired by garden city principals than the Bank Estate, with a formal, central avenue and crescent around a public reserve, cul-de-sacs and two more reserves.

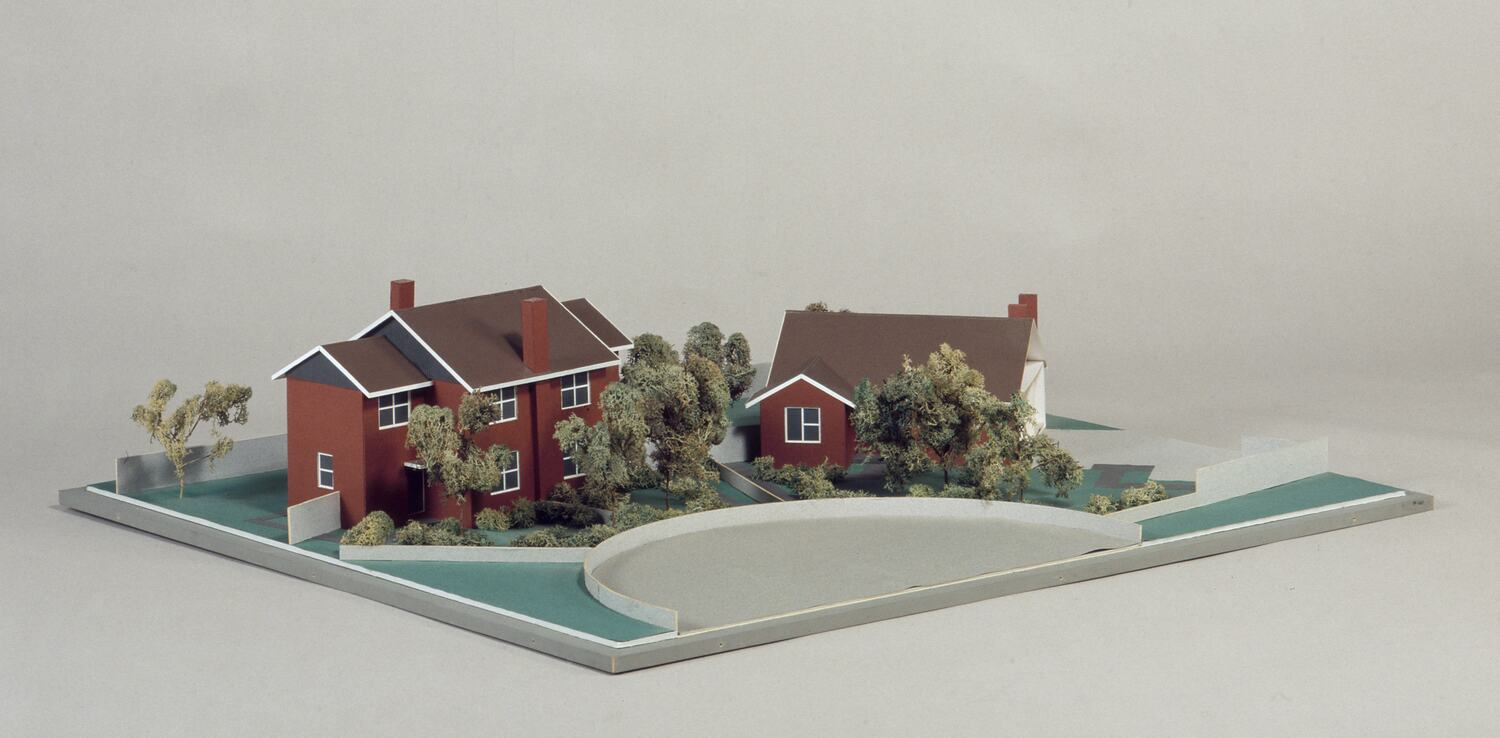
Fishermen's Bend Estate houses, model created c1989

The houses were again semi-detached, but mostly single storey, with two storey blocks at the corners, in very simple style, mostly in red brick, all with tiled roofs. Sixty houses were built of prefabricated concrete panels, an experimental approach at the time, and used again extensively by the HCV after WW2. The first pair had flat roofs, and are now listed by Heritage Victoria, while the rest had tiled hipped roofs; many of them have since been overlaid with brick or masonry exterior walls to improve their thermal performance. The estate was largely complete by 1942, including a small row of shops in Centre Avenue, where a post office opened in 1945. In 1942 Ada Mary A'Beckett began raising funds to build a kindergarten on the estate, which opened in 1949 in the central reserve (the building has since been replaced).

The Bank estate reportedly later became known 'nobs hill', a reference to relative wealth of their occupants compared to the HCV housing, known as 'Little Baghdad'.

Little change took place for decades, with the area remaining an out of the way pocket of Melbourne, the far westernmost suburb along the bay beaches, more or less surrounded by wharves, docks and light industry. In 1981 the HCV built one of their last estate of flats here, between Beacon and Barak Roads (these were demolished in 2023 pending a redevelopment).

The 1979 Port Melbourne council conservation study identified the Garden City estate as "... a unique example of residential town planning, with a substantial part remaining intact", but it was not until 1998 that all the estates became heritage precincts protected by the City of Port Phillip.

Specific guidelines have been published by the City to ensure alterations to the houses do not overly affect their heritage value. Though the estates officially have different names, the three of them as a whole are sometimes known as Garden City, while Fishermans Bend now generally refers to the area north of Williamstown Road up to the river, which in the 2010 was declared a priority redevelopment area.

Starting in the 1990s many of the Fishermen's Bend and Dunstan Estate houses were sold, and this former working class social housing, built to alleviate the worst impacts of the depression, quickly became sought-after inner city property. Many of the Fishermen's Bend HCV houses were altered and with large extensions added, and in some cases replaced. The State Bank houses by contrast have remained largely intact, even though they were always privately owned, perhaps because they were already two storey, and in an attractive style. By the mid 2020s real estate websites were quoting State Bank houses at about $2,500,000, and waterfront HVC houses at a similar price.
