= HPV (disambiguation) =

HPV is human papillomavirus, a virus which causes human papillomavirus infection (HPV infection).

HPV may also refer to:

== Biology and medicine ==
- Hepatic portal vein, a blood vessel
- Hepatopancreatic parvovirus, a virus
- Hypoxic pulmonary vasoconstriction, a physiological phenomenon of the lungs
- Hydrogen peroxide vapor, an antimicrobial vapor
- Health Purchasing Victoria, an Australian public authority

== Other uses ==
- Human-powered vehicle, a land, water or air vehicle powered by humans
- High production volume chemicals (HPV chemicals), produced or imported into the US in large quantities

== See also ==
- HP5 (disambiguation)
