= Craig Lapsley =

Emergency Management Commissioner, Emergency Management Victoria
- In office July 1, 2014 – August 7, 2018
- Succeeded by: Andrew Crisp

Craig Lapsley is a former senior public servant in Australia who provided active service to the Victorian Country Fire Authority, the New South Wales Fire Brigades, the Victoria State Emergency Service, and Emergency Management Victoria. Lapsley served as the inaugural Emergency Management Commissioner of Emergency Management Victoria between July 2014 until August 2018, with overall responsibility for coordination before, during and after major emergencies including management of consequences of an emergency.

== Career ==
Lapsley served approximately 30-years in Australian emergency management, mostly with the Victorian Country Fire Authority (CFA) including service as a volunteer firefighter. Lapsley finished his employment with CFA in August 2007, ranked as Deputy Chief Officer. During his service with the CFA, in 1996 Lapsley was seconded to NSW Fire Brigades in the position of Manager State Operations for two years. He was also seconded to Victoria State Emergency Service (SES) in 2005 to transform the SES from a government department to a newly formed statutory authority.

In 2007, he was appointed Director Emergency Management, Health and Human Services and was responsible for the health sector emergency response to major incidents including mass casualty, pre-hospital (ambulance) and hospital surge capability. This extended to the state coordination and management of recovery arrangements for all emergencies, including recovery efforts after the 2009 Black Saturday bushfires.

In 2010, Lapsley was appointed as Victoria's first and only Fire Services Commissioner.

As Victoria’s first Emergency Management Commissioner, appointed under the Emergency Management Act 2013, Lapsley worked on the shift to an “all communities, all emergencies” approach to emergency management will ensure a systematic and coordinated approach before, during and after major emergencies. He was also focussed on opportunities for the alignment of strategy, planning and investment across multiple agencies, to champion unified information systems, a culture of information sharing, and a sharp and deliberate focus on better decision making with the community as a central partner in emergency management.

In 2018, Lapsley stepped down as Victoria's Emergency Management Commissioner. He was succeeded by Andrew Crisp, from Victoria Police.

== Patronage and other activities ==
- Chief Patron of Road Rescue Association Victoria
- Committee member of National Emergency Services Advisory Committee of the Australian Red Cross
- Director with the Victorian Emergency Services Foundation
- Bushfire and Natural Hazards Cooperative Research Centre (CRC)
- Patron of SARDA (Search and Rescue Dog Association), the Bendigo Football Netball League and the Central Victorian Fire Preservation Society

Public service appointments
New title	Emergency Management Commissioner, Emergency Management Victoria; 2014 – 2018	Succeeded by Andrew Crisp
Fire appointments
New title	Fire Services Commissioner; 2010 – 2014	Position abolished
