= Frederick Oswald Barnett =

Australian social reformer

Frederick Oswald Barnett (1883–1972) was an Australian social reformer. He was responsible for raising public awareness of inner-city poverty and leading the campaign for improved housing conditions.

== Early life ==
Born on 28 September 1883 in Brunswick, a suburb of Melbourne in Victoria, Australia, Barnett was the son of working-class parents. He attended the Albert Street Primary School until 1898 when he joined the Education Department, initially as monitor, and eventually as student-teacher. He resigned in 1902, to become a clerk in the civil service. By 1920 he had qualified as a public accountant and established his own practice.

On 6 January 1909 he married Elizabeth Hyett, with whom he was to have four daughters and a son.

== Career ==
Throughout his life, Barnett was influenced by the Christian socialist tradition of the Methodist Church. In 1923, shocked after a visit to a slum mission, he joined with a group of other young Methodists which resulted in the foundation of the Methodist Babies Home in South Yarra in 1929. In 1928 he had graduated a Bachelor of Commerce from Melbourne University; in 1931 he completed a master's degree with the thesis “The Economics of the Slums” in which he correlated the physical condition of housing with the social condition of its residents. In 1934 he formed a study group of about 40 members comprising the lawyer Oswald Burt, several notable architects and a surveyor/town planner, Fr Tucker of the Brotherhood of St Lawrence and representatives of other church and charitable institutions. The group held weekly meetings to receive and discuss papers about housing reform and soon attracted the attention of the major evening newspaper, The Herald.

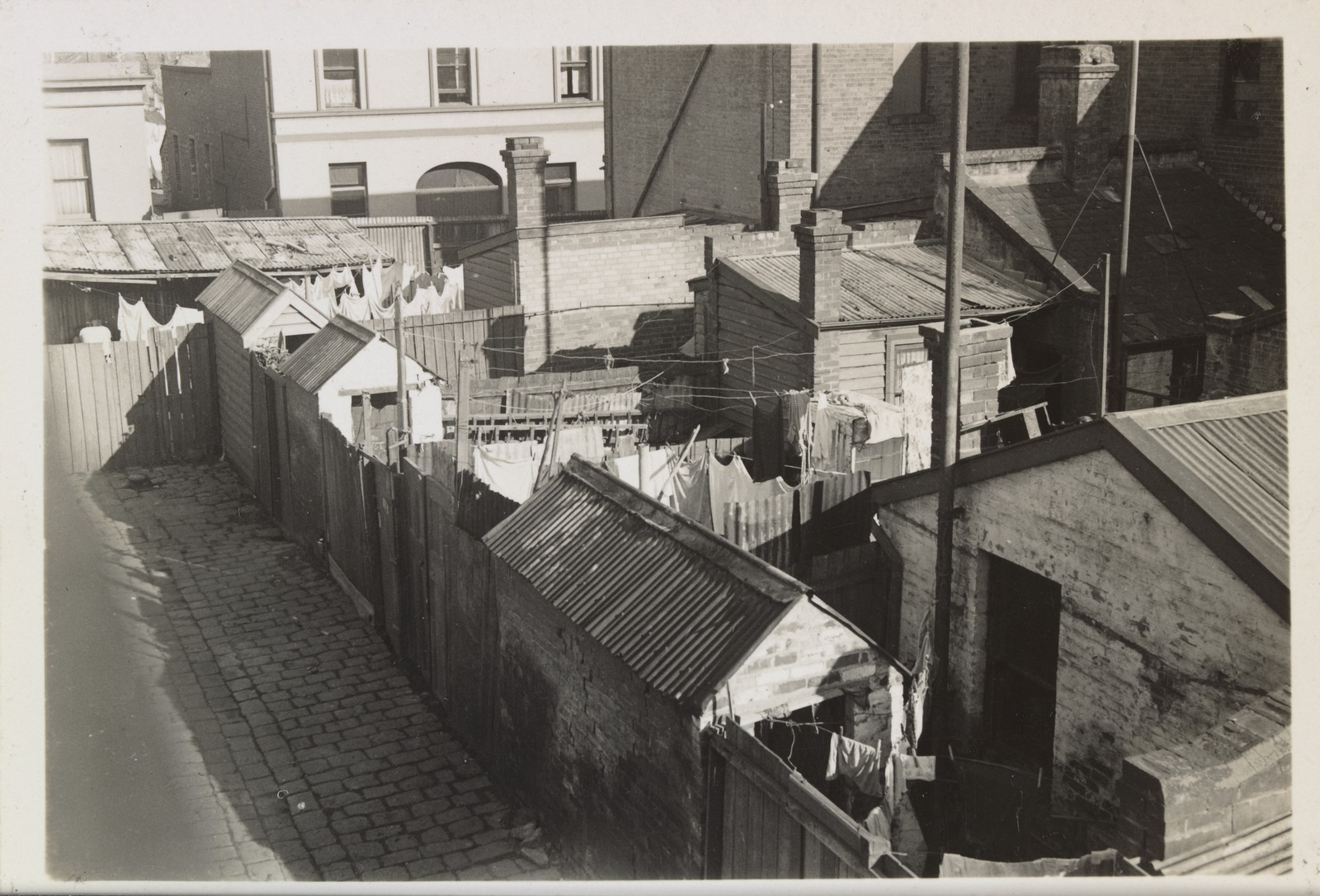
Fitzroy. Back yards of five houses. State Library Victoria

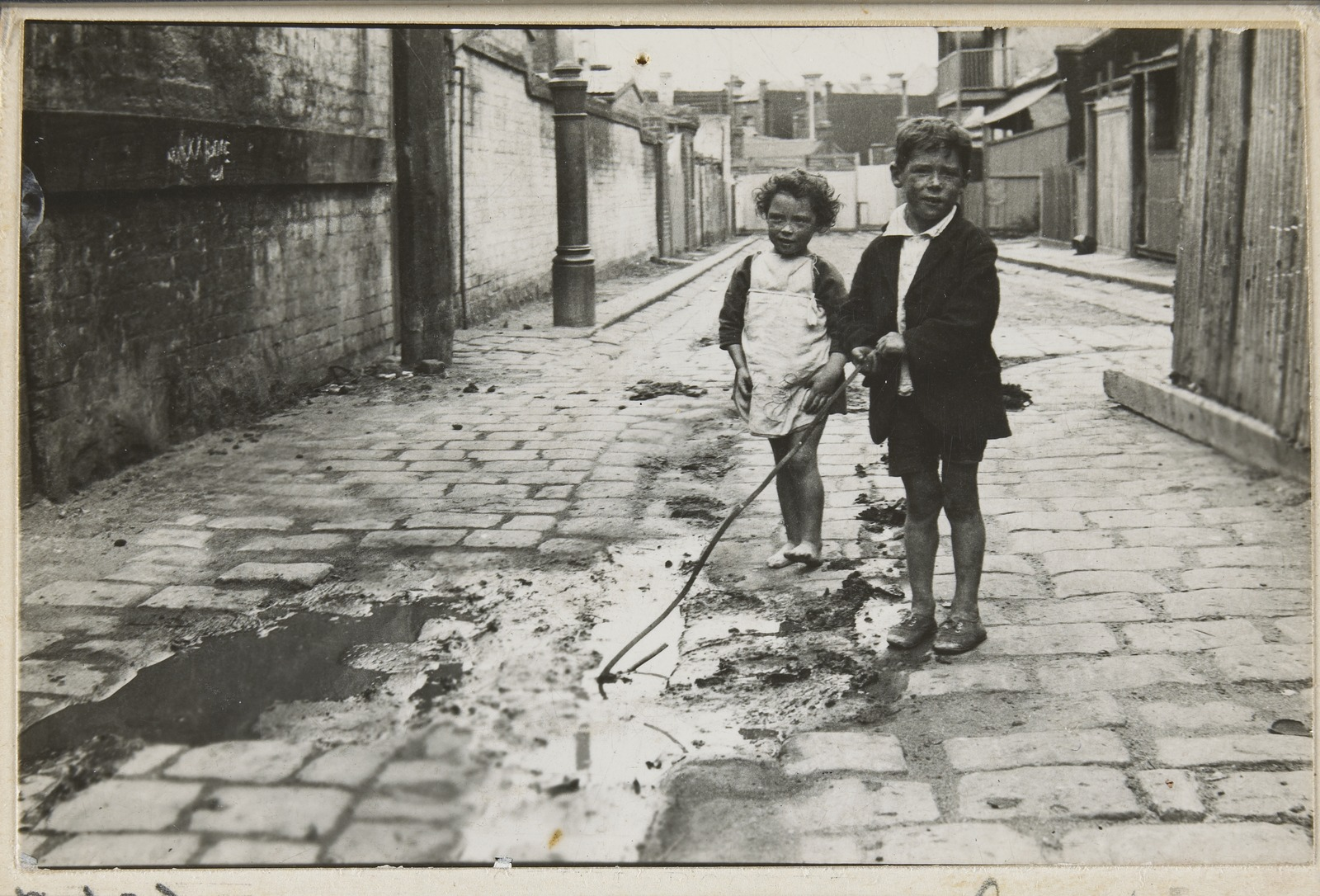
Carlton. Entrance to slum pocket. State Library Victoria

In 1935, a new government was elected, led by Albert Dunstan of the Country Party, with the support of the Australian Labor Party. Heavily influenced by Barnett's study group, the new government appointed a Slum Abolition Committee (SAC). At the same time, Barnett and his group formed their own Housing Reform Council, which went on to become the Slum Abolition and Better Housing League. In 1936 the SAC became the Housing Investigation and Slum Abolition Board (HISAB); Barnett was its deputy chairman and other members of his group, including Burt, were prominent on it. The Board initially embarked on two initiatives: Firstly, to conduct a survey of housing within a five-mile radius of the GPO and secondly to make recommendations to the government on rehousing persons displaced by slum reclamation schemes. In the course of the survey, Barnett came to the realisation that slums were a result of poverty, rather than social condition and that such people would not be suitable for a house purchase scheme, but rather should be given rented accommodation at subsidized rates. In 1937 the board reported to the government; amongst other things, the report contained a list of slum landlords, causing a storm of protest. The report was subsequently criticized for concentrating on housing conditions, rather than issues of poverty, housing shortage and excessively high rents. Nevertheless, the government was pressured into passing the Housing Act of 1937 which enabled the constitution of the Housing Commission of Victoria (HCV).

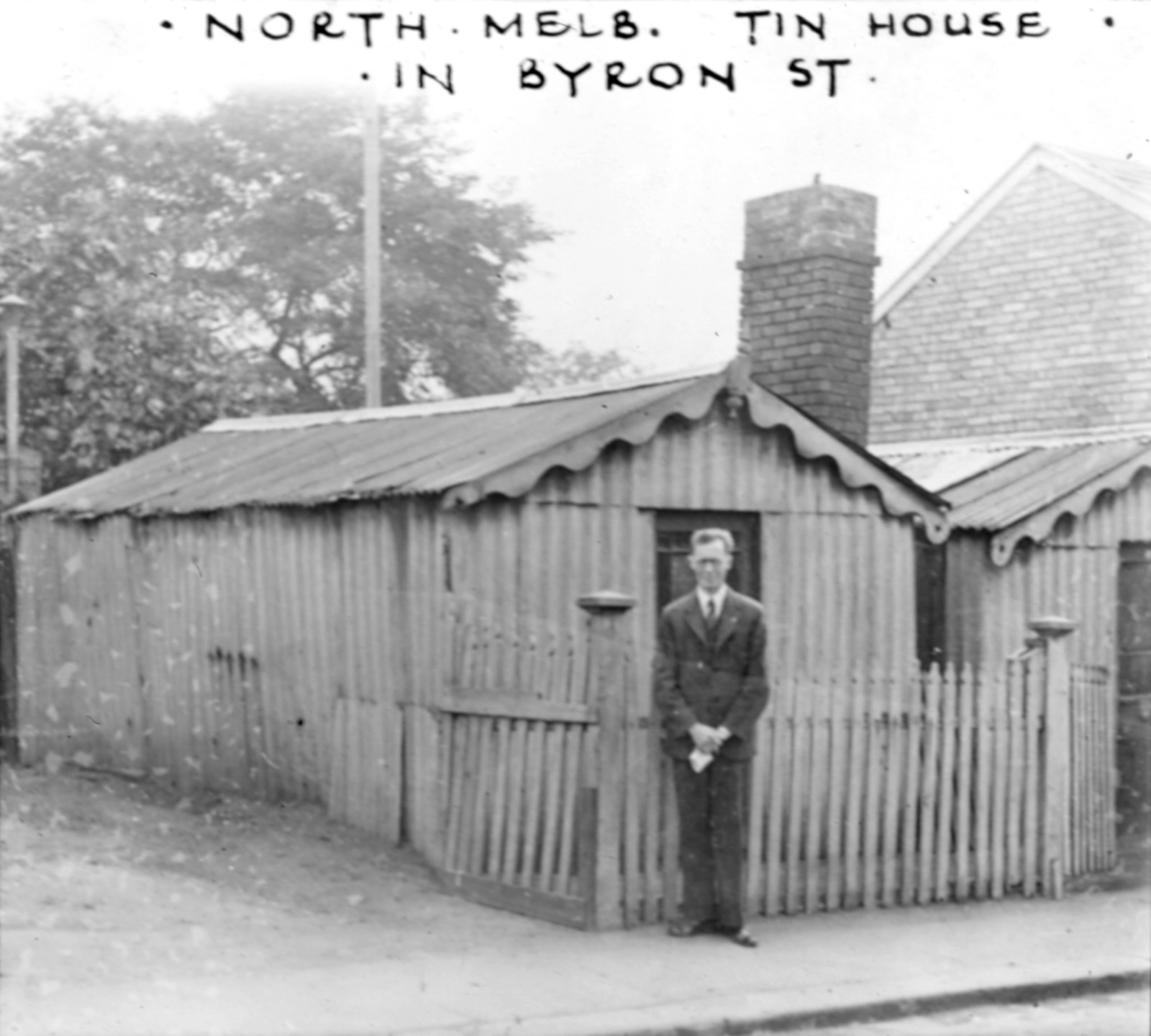
North Melb. Tin house in Byron Street. State Library Victoria

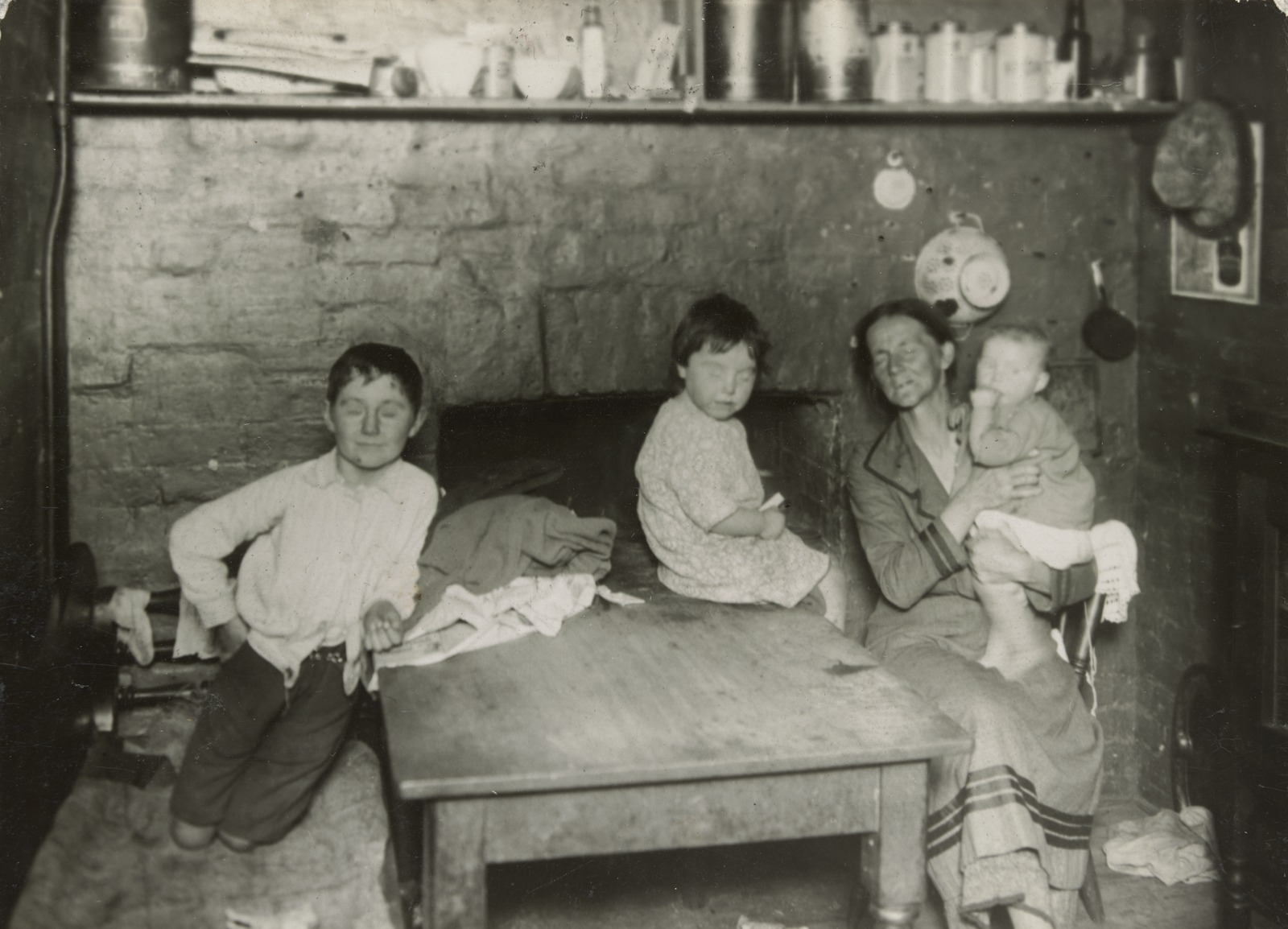
Carlton (Kitchen interior with woman and three children). State Library Victoria

The new Housing Commission was required to (i) Improve existing housing conditions; (ii) provide adequate and suitable houses for letting or leasing to people displaced from reclamation areas, people living under unsatisfactory housing conditions, and other eligible people; (iii) sell houses to eligible persons and make advances to eligible persons to enable them to become the owners of their own homes; (iv) Develop land for housing and related purposes. The commission, with a full-time Chairman, John O’Connor and three part-time commissioners, Barnett and Burt from HISAB and a social worker, Frances Pennington, met for the first time on 1 March 1938. The HCV proceeded to purchase land and develop low-cost (low-rental) housing for the poor, with the first projects constructed in Port Melbourne and Carlton. The early years of the HCV were marked by the conflict of the reformers’ desires with the social, economic and political realities. Some HCV proposals were later constrained by the passing of the Town and Country Planning Act of 1944 which stipulated minimum house block sizes. In February 1948, after repeatedly clashing with the Minister for Housing, B. Barry, both Barnett and Burt declined reappointment to the HCV. Barnett became a vocal opponent of the new HCV multi-storey housing tower schemes.

== Later life ==
For the remainder of his life, Oswald Barnett retained a strong interest in social reform. He remained an important figure in the Methodist Church, as a lay preacher and author of religious tracts. He also wrote several volumes of poetry and a book of revised nursery rhymes. In 1959 Barnett married Florence Fowles, his first wife having died in 1956. He formally retired from his accountancy firm in 1962, and died at Box Hill on 3 May 1972.

An annual oration has been instituted in memory of him. The first F. Oswald Barnett Oration was delivered by Associate Professor Renate Howe of Deakin University at St Kilda on 21 October 1994. The oration seeks to acknowledge the contribution Barnett made to eliminating poor housing conditions and is organised by Housing Choices Australia, a national not-for-profit housing provider who creates safe, quality, affordable housing for people who are struggling to find a home in Australia's challenging private rental market. Prior to Housing Choices Australia, it was jointly sponsored by Ecumenical Housing, (a commission of the Victorian Council of Churches) and Copelen Child and Family Services (formerly Methodist Babies’ Home).

== Publications ==
Articles and treatises

- ‘The Economics of the Slums’, M Comm thesis, University of Melbourne, 1931.
- The Unsuspected Slums, The Herald and Weekly Times, Melbourne, 1933.
- Housing Investigation and Slum Abolition Board, 1936–37. First Progress Report, Victoria, Parliamentary Papers, 1937 (with WO Burt, M Barlow et al.).
- The Making of a Criminal, Melbourne, 1940.
- The New Testament Basis of Pacifism, Melbourne, 1940.
- Housing the Australian Nation, Left Book Club Research Group, Melbourne, 1942 (with WO Burt).
- Housing and the Church, Christian Social Order Movement, Sydney, 1944 (Ecumenical Housing Collection).
- The Poverty of the People in Australia, Good Companions’ Christian Social Order Group, Melbourne, 1944 (with AG Pearson).
- We Must Go On: A Study of Planned Reconstruction and Housing, Melbourne, 1944 (with WO Burt and FN Heath).
- ‘The Flesh and Blood Aspects of Planning’, Twentieth Century: An Australian Quarterly Review, March, 1948.
- Is it Safe to Adopt a Baby? A Social Study, Melbourne, 1949, Ministry of Planning and Housing Library.
- The Divinity of Christ from a Layman's Point of View, The Book Depot, Melbourne, 1949 (Ecumenical Housing Collection).
- I Remember. Reminiscences, typescript, Ministry of Planning and Housing Library,(1964).

Poetry

- Prayers Before I Sleep, 1945.
- Prayers When I Awake, 1945.
- I Hear the Tramp of Millions, 1945.
- Happy Endings to Old Nursery Rhymes - Rhymes by F. Oswald Barnett Pictures by Dorothy Dibdin, The Book Depot Melbourne 1945.
- Prayers for Those Who Cannot Sleep, 1946.
- How Lovely is This World and other Poems, NH Seward Pty, Melbourne, 1961

== See also ==
- Dudley Flats
- Public housing in Australia
- Housing Commission of Victoria
- Slums of Melbourne
