= Housing Commission of Victoria =

Government body in Australia

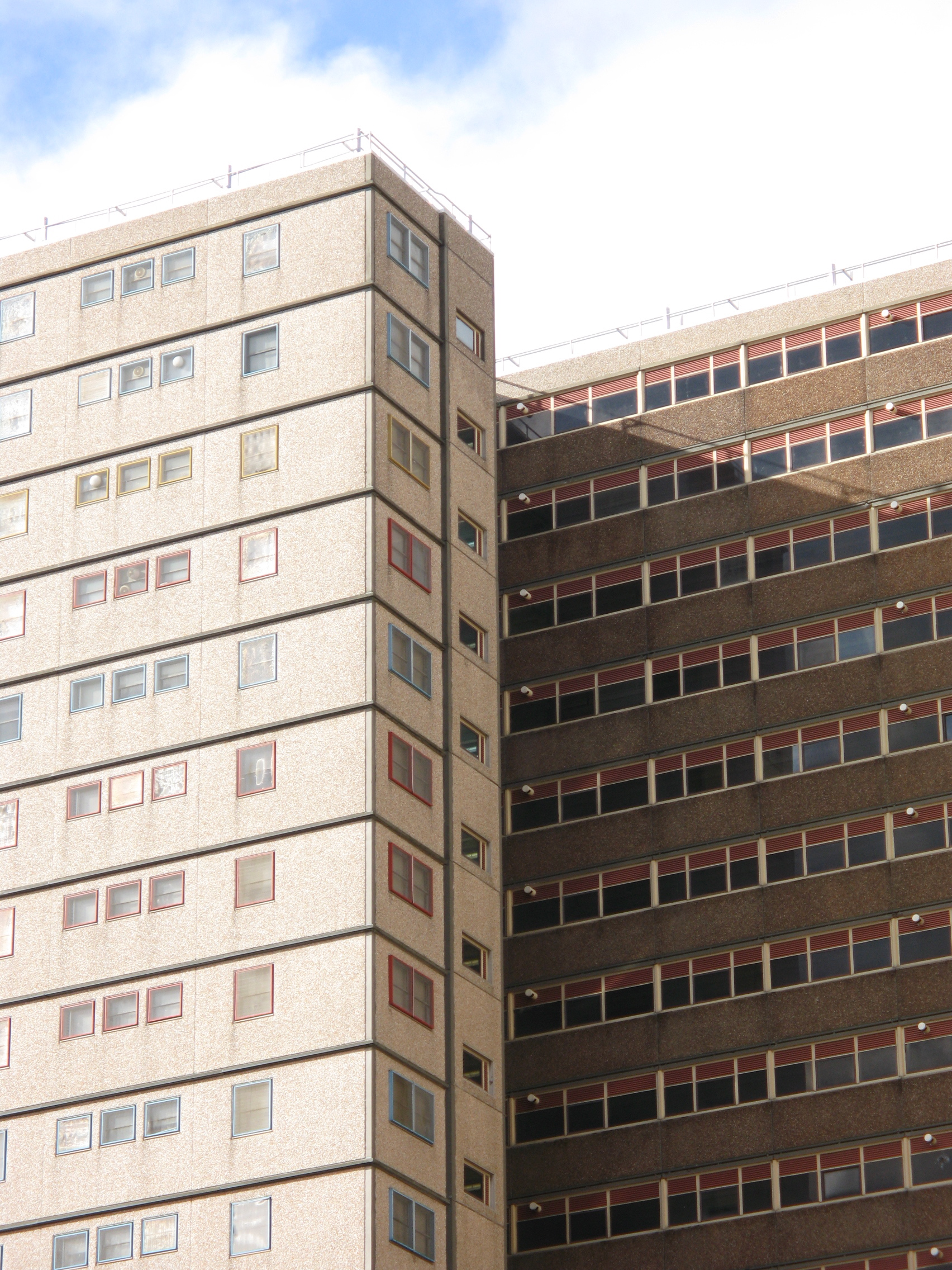
Part of the Wellington Street, Collingwood Housing Commission building built 1971. 47 of these template designed steel framed concrete towers consisting of pre-cast slabs covered in exposed aggregate, some as tall as 20 to 30 storeys, were constructed across inner Melbourne during the 1960s and early 1970s.

The Housing Commission of Victoria (often shortened to Housing Commission, especially colloquially) was a Government of Victoria body responsible for public housing in Victoria, Australia. It was established in 1938, and was abolished in 1984.

The main activity of the commission was the construction tens of thousands of houses and flats in Melbourne and many country towns between the late 1940s and the early 70s, providing low rent housing for low income families. The most visible legacy of the commission is the 44 high-rise apartment towers in inner Melbourne, all built using the same pre-cast concrete panel technology as part of a major urban renewal. Many of the larger estates such as: Atherton Gardens (Fitzroy), Debney Estate (Flemington), Horace Petty Estate (South Yarra), Collingwood and Richmond Estates were modelled on the Towers in the park design philosophy popular in large cities around the world such as New York and London. Others such as Park Towers were maximised for height in already built up areas. Archive footage exists of construction and life within Melbourne's Housing Commission towers of the 1960s such as this Video on YouTube.

In 2023, the Government of Victoria announced it intended to demolish all the remaining high rise towers which house more than 5,800 families and redevelop the sites under a Public–private partnership model. This has stimulated significant public debate over their heritage significance and possible protection and also their role in alleviating Melbourne's housing crisis and possible refurbishment.

== History ==
=== Establishment ===
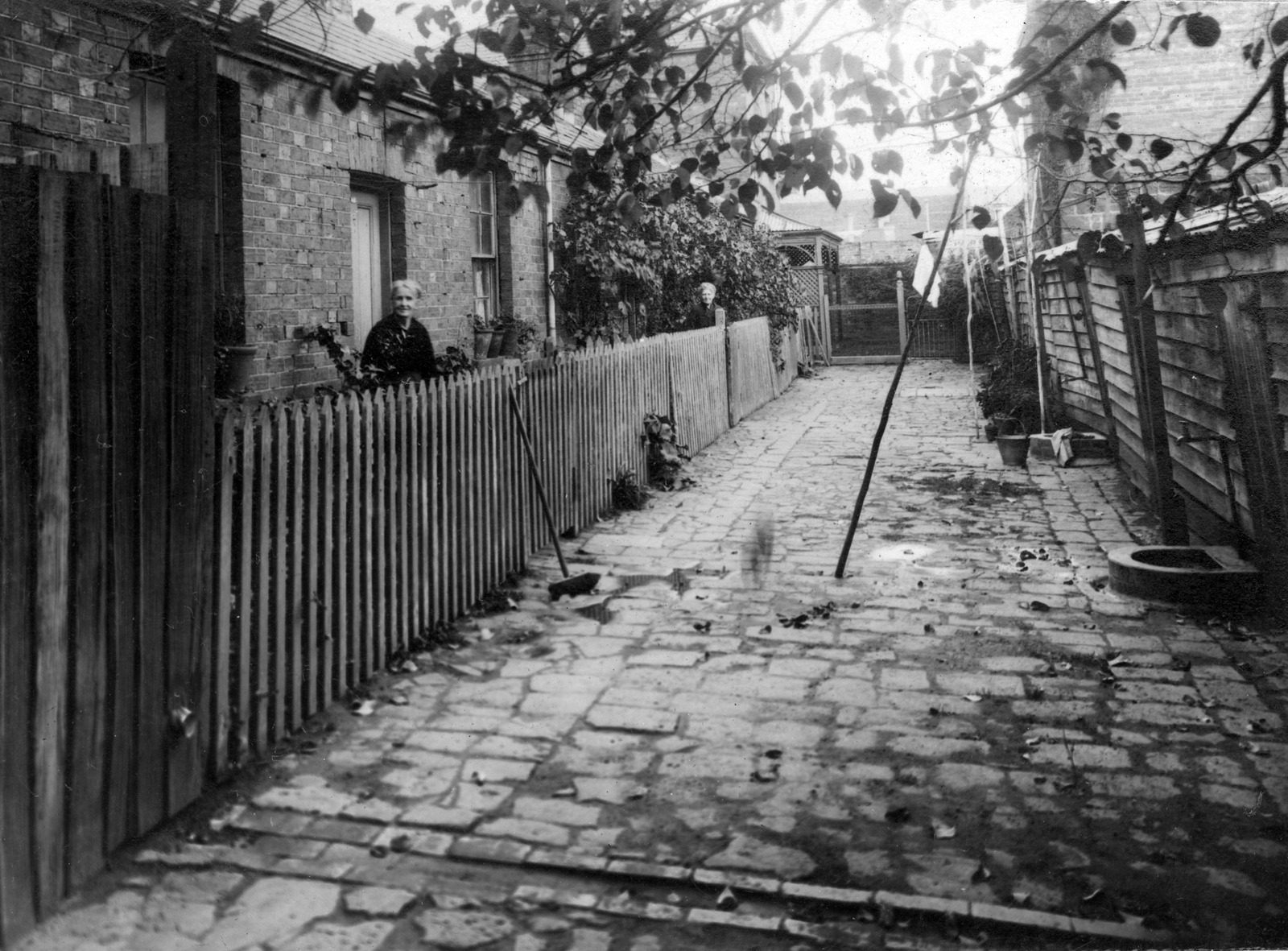
Carlton. Slum pocket. ca. 1930

Through the 1920s and early 1930s, a campaign highlighting the dreadful conditions and moral dangers of the "slums" of inner city Melbourne was led by social reformer F. Oswald Barnett. During the Great Depression, Barnett wrote a thesis, submitted to the University of Melbourne, entitled The Unsuspected Slums, exploring the slum problem in Melbourne. Barnett received high praise for his thesis, which was later published by the Melbourne Herald and consolidated his status as the leading anti-slum campaigner in Melbourne.

Run-down housing in the inner city areas had deteriorated during the Great Depression, creating a "housing crisis". During the Depression, little new housing was built, which also led to rental housing being a "seller's market".

Barnett's campaigning against slums led to the establishment the Housing Investigation and Slum Abolition Board (HISAB) in July 1936. The proponents advocated using unemployment relief funds for the rehousing of slum occupants to rentals based on social rather than economic conditions. The Board's 1937 report found 3,000 houses "unfit for habitation" and recommended the establishment of a housing commission. Famously, at the same time, Barnett invited Premier Albert Dunstan to join him on a personal tour of the slums. The Dunstan government established the Housing Commission of Victoria shortly thereafter. John O’Connor was the commission's first chairman, while Oswald Barnett, Oswald Burt and Frances Pennington were appointed as part-time commissioners.

The Housing Act 1937 established the Housing Commission of Victoria with the responsibility to improve existing housing conditions and to provide adequate housing for people of limited means. The Slum Reclamation Act 1938 and the Reclamation and Housing (Financial) Act 1938 provided the framework for the commission's work. On the passing of the legislation, Premier Dunstan declared the beginning of the commission's activities as a "war on slums", but also recognised the magnitude of the task before it.

The legislation not only gave the Commission powers to construct and improve housing, it made it a "planning authority in its own right". The Commission's chief concerns, however, were the "slum pockets" which required "excision" for the "common good". It developed a plan of action in March 1938, concentrating its attention on 1,240 houses in lanes, rights-of-way and slum pockets, referred to in HISAB's earlier report. Slums were to be reclaimed and people rehoused.

To house the people moved from the slum areas, the commission needed to provide new homes. Its first estate was an extension to the Garden City Estate in Port Melbourne, where pre-cast concrete technologies were employed for the first time to build 370 homes. Next was the development of flats at Pigdon Street, Carlton, though the original proposal for three-storey flats was reduced to two storeys after local opposition. The commission then began to acquire cheap land in the northern suburbs of Coburg, Brunswick, Preston and Northcote as well as in inner suburban areas such as North Melbourne, Fitzroy and Richmond. The few estates built by the Commission before World War II comprised modestly scaled suburban style housing, in simple brick construction, mostly as duplexes, such as the Racecourse Estate in Richmond, and the Railton Grove Precinct in Preston.

The Commission's acquisition plans were ambitious and it was bound to come across difficulties. The synchronisation of the 'demolition program' was proving difficult and by June 1940, only 53 families had moved into new houses while only 99 houses had been ordered for demolition. The commission also had difficulties dealing with local municipalities, in acquiring properties in the North Melbourne reclamation area as well as with the labour movement, who believed that the government should subsidise loans to enable workers to buy homes rather than rent them. The rehousing of those from the slums was a difficult task.

As a landlord, the commission also experienced problems. Tenants were initially reluctant to move, while rents on the estates were more expensive than in their former accommodation. At Fishermans Bend, there was tension between tenants of the commission's estate and those who had bought homes under an earlier housing program; vandalism was also a problem, both at Fishermans Bend and in the West Brunswick estate. Frances Penington, who was also a social worker, advocated for community facilities to be built at the estates to alleviate some of these problems, these were built after protracted debate by others on the commission. Transportation costs from the new estates to places of employment were also an issue. Despite these issues, residents 'adjusted to their new homes and locations' and appreciated the 'better home environment'.

By 1942, building had halted as the commission shifted its focus to post-war planning. It continued to acquire land though, taking advantage of low prices by purchasing land in industrial areas in the western suburbs as well as in the middle class eastern and southern suburbs. The commission, in its planning authority capacity had also drawn up plans for the future development of Melbourne but by 1944, it was lacking resources to deal with backlogs of council plans. The commission recruited Frank Heath from its advisory Architects Panel to deal with these problems but it was stripped of its town planning powers later in the same year. The commission's 1944 report found that housing was required in 'large numbers as quickly as possible to house those recently returned to civilian life and catch up on the lag of construction over the war years'. The end of the slum abolitionism was in part due to the ambiguity surrounding what constituted a slum. Slum abolitionists were left disappointed because the sensationalism carried by the slum problem were communicated to the mainstream community over messages such as social inequity and social reform.

While the commission was planning for the future, so were its commissioners. Barnett and Burt published Housing the Australian Nation, reviewing the slum reclamation, but also putting forward their plans for a national housing policy. Barnett, Burt and Heath published We Must Go On calling for a fairer society and centralised planning. By now, housing for growing numbers was the main concern.

=== Addressing the postwar housing shortage ===
After World War II, with greater funding and a severe housing shortage, the Commission's activities greatly expanded through the late 1940s into the 1950s. They began to build larger and larger estates of housing in the suburban fringes, as well as country towns, of both single homes and duplexes, from stylish Old English style double brick to simple unadorned prefabricated weatherboard. The compulsory purchase and demolition of blocks of 'slums' in the inner and middle ring suburbs also gathered pace, usually replaced by apartment buildings of various designs, from long two storey blocks of prefabricated construction placed diagonally on the blocks in a garden setting to concentrated blocks of concrete and brick four storey walk-ups. Despite the offer of attractive accommodation many residents in 1953 resisted compulsory acquisition, objecting to the affordability of proposed new units. The new housing was too expensive for low income earners and aiming it at middle income earners was regarded by some as dooming the project to fail.

The Commission was keen to produce the largest number of houses at the lowest cost, and in an era when prefabrication was widely regarded as the most efficient construction method, the Commission continued its pre-war development of precast concrete houses. In 1946 it leased the former Commonwealth Tank factory building in suburban Holmesglen, transforming it into a 'Housing Factory' for the production of prefabricated concrete houses and flats. The entire operation became a production line process and by 1948, 1,000 houses had been produced. In the middle 1950s, the factory was producing two to four storey walk up flats, and by 1964 the Concrete House Project was turning out pre-cast walls for villas as well as walk-ups and would soon be producing the components for high rise towers.

=== 1960s high rises ===
Approximately 27 precast concrete 20 to 30 storey height buildings were constructed around Melbourne in the 1960s, until the type of development fell into disrepute. By 1970 nearly 4000 privately owned dwellings had been compulsory acquired and replaced by nearly 7000 high rise flats.

In the period of the 1960s-70s large scale redevelopment by the Housing Commission of Victoria caused the displacement of low-income residents. Few former residents residing in the inner-city areas whose houses were demolished by the Commission were resettled in the inner city.

In the early 1970s with the towers out of favour, the Commission turned back to building large suburban estates, including the creation of satellite towns in Pakenham, Sunbury and Melton. The purchase of the land however was poorly handled, the Commission spending $11 million on land, some of which was not suitable for housing, and handing handsome profits to speculators. This 'land scandal' led to a Royal Commission in 1979 which found no evidence of corruption.

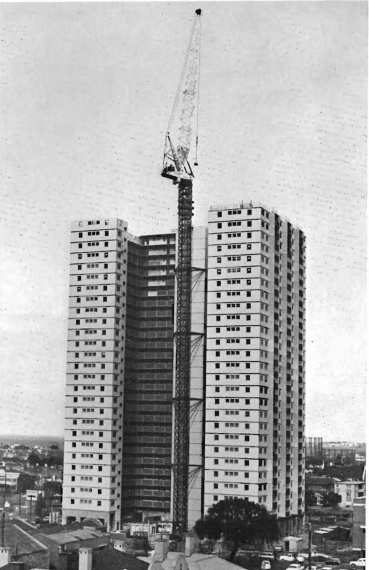
Park Towers in South Melbourne being built in 1967-68

There are 28 sites, spread across 19 suburbs in inner Melbourne that contain around 44 high rises in total (some already demolished and all to be demolished and replaced by 2051). The largest sites contain four towers each as well as a numerous walk-up flats (many replaced in the 2010s); Elizabeth Street, Richmond, Atherton Gardens, Fitzroy, Lygon Street Carlton and Racecourse Road, Flemington. Other large sites contain three buildings; Boundary Road, North Melbourne and Malvern Road, South Yarra. The towers vary between 20 and 30 storeys in height and come in a variety of plan forms; S, T, Y, I, L and C-shape, the most common being the S-shape. The high-rises have become somewhat iconic, the instantly recognisable image of the Melbourne 'Housing Commission Tower Block' has been used in artworks, film and TV, and as a graphics on T-shirts, bags and the like.

=== Sites ===
The height of the towers is proportional to the number of storeys with each storey at 2.6 metres of height resulting in a typical height for a 20 storey tower being 52 metres.

Image	Suburb	Location	Original Name	Constructed	Buildings (Shape)	Max Height (storeys)	Units	Notes / ref
	Albert Park	150 Victoria Avenue (Corner of Reed Street)	Layfield Court	1966	1 (I-Shaped)	12	78-97	Earmarked for demolition
	Brunswick	351 Barkly Street (Corner of McKay Street)	Barkly Street Estate		1 (S-Shaped)	12	216	
	Carlton	20 Elgin Street (Corner of Nicholson Street)	Elgin Estate	1968	2 (I-Shaped)	18	96-98	Distinctive red brick design. Demolished 2024-2026
	Carlton	480 & 510 Lygon Street & 140 Neill Street	Lygon Estate	1965-67	4 (2 S-Shaped, 1 Y-Shaped, 1 T-Shaped)	20	503 (178 + 177 + 148)	
	Collingwood	229 & 253 Hoddle Street (Between Perry & Vere Streets); 240 Wellington Street (Between Perry & Vere Streets)	Collingwood Estate	1968-71	3 (S-Shaped)	20	560 (180 + 180 + 200)	
	Fitzroy	Brunswick Street & Napier Street (Between Gertrude & Condell Streets)	Atherton Gardens Estate	1969-71	4 (S-Shaped) 1 Low Rise	20	824 (200 + 200 + 200 + 200 +24)	95 Napier (1970); 90 Brunswick (1971); 140 Brunswick (1971); 125 Napier (1971) 100 Napier 24 (1971)
	Flemington	120 Racecourse Road, 1 building (S-Shaped), 126 Racecourse Road, 1 building (S-Shaped), 130 Racecourse Road, 1 building (S-Shaped), 12 Holland Court, 1 building (S-Shaped)	Debney Meadows (Debney Park) Estate	1962-65	4 (S-Shaped)	20	527 (174 + 173 + 180)	12 Holland Court and 120 Raccourse Road will be demolished in 2025-26
	Flemington	29 Crown Street	Crown Street Estate	1962	1 (I-Shaped)	12	145	Earmarked for demolition
	Footscray	127 Gordon Street (Corner of Shepherd Street)	Gaskin Gardens	1972	1 (T-Shaped)	12	168	
	Kensington	56 Derby Street (L-Shaped); 72 Derby Street (L-Shaped); 94 Ormond Street (I-Shaped)	Holland Estate	1963	2 (L-Shaped), 1 (I-Shaped)	12	200 (105 Derby + 95 Ormond)	72 Derby Street was Demolished in 1999, the first and only public housing tower to be demolished in Melbourne until 2024. 94 Ormond Street is earmarked for demolition
	North Melbourne	33 Alfred Street, 3 buildings (1 Y-Shaped); 12 Sutton Street (1 S-Shaped, 1 T-Shaped); 76 Canning Street (Corner of Boundary Road), 1 building (I-Shaped)	Hotham Estate	1963-66	1 (T-Shaped)	12 & 20	483 (179 + 149 + 155)	33 Alfred Street will be demolished in 2025-26, 159 Melrose Street is earmarked for demolition
	Northcote	1 Holmes Street (Off Heidelberg Road near Merri Creek)	Frank Wilkes Court (Northcote Estate)	1971	1 building (S-Shaped)	12	139	
	Port Melbourne	Corner Evans, Raglan and Ross Street		Mid 1950s	2 (Linear)	5		
	Prahran	25 & 27 King Street	King Street Estate	1974-75	2 (T-Shaped)	12	192	Earmarked for demolition
	Richmond	106, 108, 110 and 112 Elizabeth Street	Richmond Estate	1969-1970	4 (S-Shaped)	20	795 (197 + 198 + 199 + 201)	
	Richmond	139 Highett Street (Corner of Lennox Street)	Lennox Street Estate	1969	1 (S-Shaped)	20	200	This tower will be demolished in 2027-28
	St Kilda	150 Inkerman Street (Corner of Henryville Street)	Inkerman Heights	1966	1 (T-Shaped)	12	140	Earmarked for demolition
	South Melbourne	332 Park Street. Corner of Park & Cecil Streets	Park Towers	1967-69	1 (E or C-Shaped)	30	297	Tallest Public Housing Tower in Melbourne. Proposed for heritage protection
	South Melbourne	200 Dorcas Street (Emerald Hill Court - 1 building 2 conjoined rectangular towers); Moray Coventry & Dorcas Street: 4 x 5 storey (linear)	Emerald Hill Estate	1960-1962	1 (Conjoined Rectangular)	17	119	First public housing high rise to be built in Melbourne
	South Yarra	Bounded by Malvern Road, Simmons, Surrey. Essex Street and Little Chapel Street	Horace Petty Estate	1963 (walk up flats), 1967 (towers)	3 (2 Y-Shaped, 1 S-Shaped 3 Linear)	12	624	259 Malvern Road will be demolished in 2026-27
	Williamstown	63 Hamner Street (Corner of Thompson & Hanmer Street)	Floyd Lodge	1967	1 (I-Shaped)	12	117	
	Williamstown North	235 Nelson Place (Corner of Nelson Place & Pasco Street)	Nelson Heights	1963	1 (S-Shaped)	12	98	
	Windsor	49 Union Street	Loxton Lodge	1966	1 (S-Shaped)	12		

==== Gallery ====
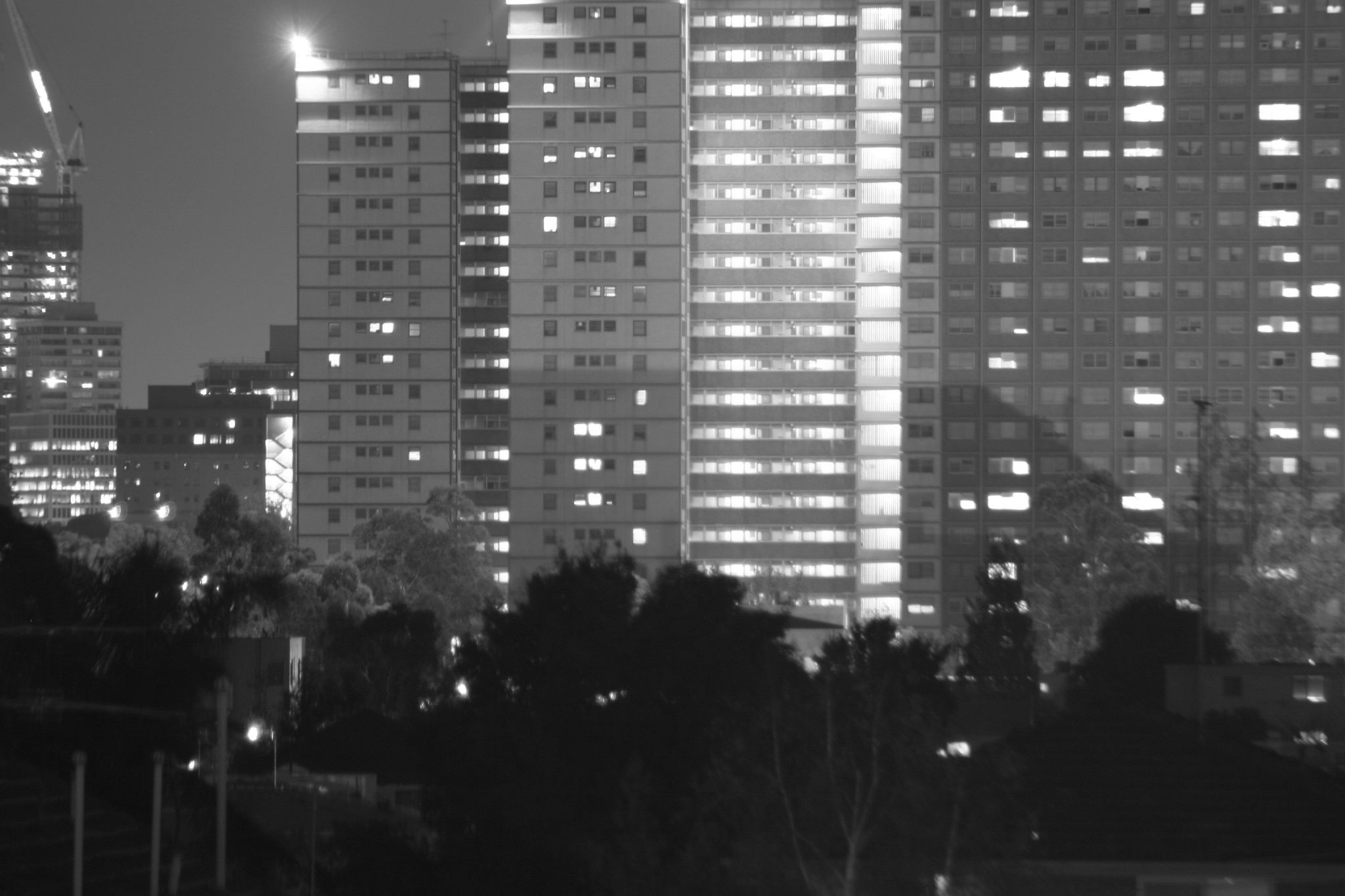
View of the North Richmond Estate, Richmond at night in 2005

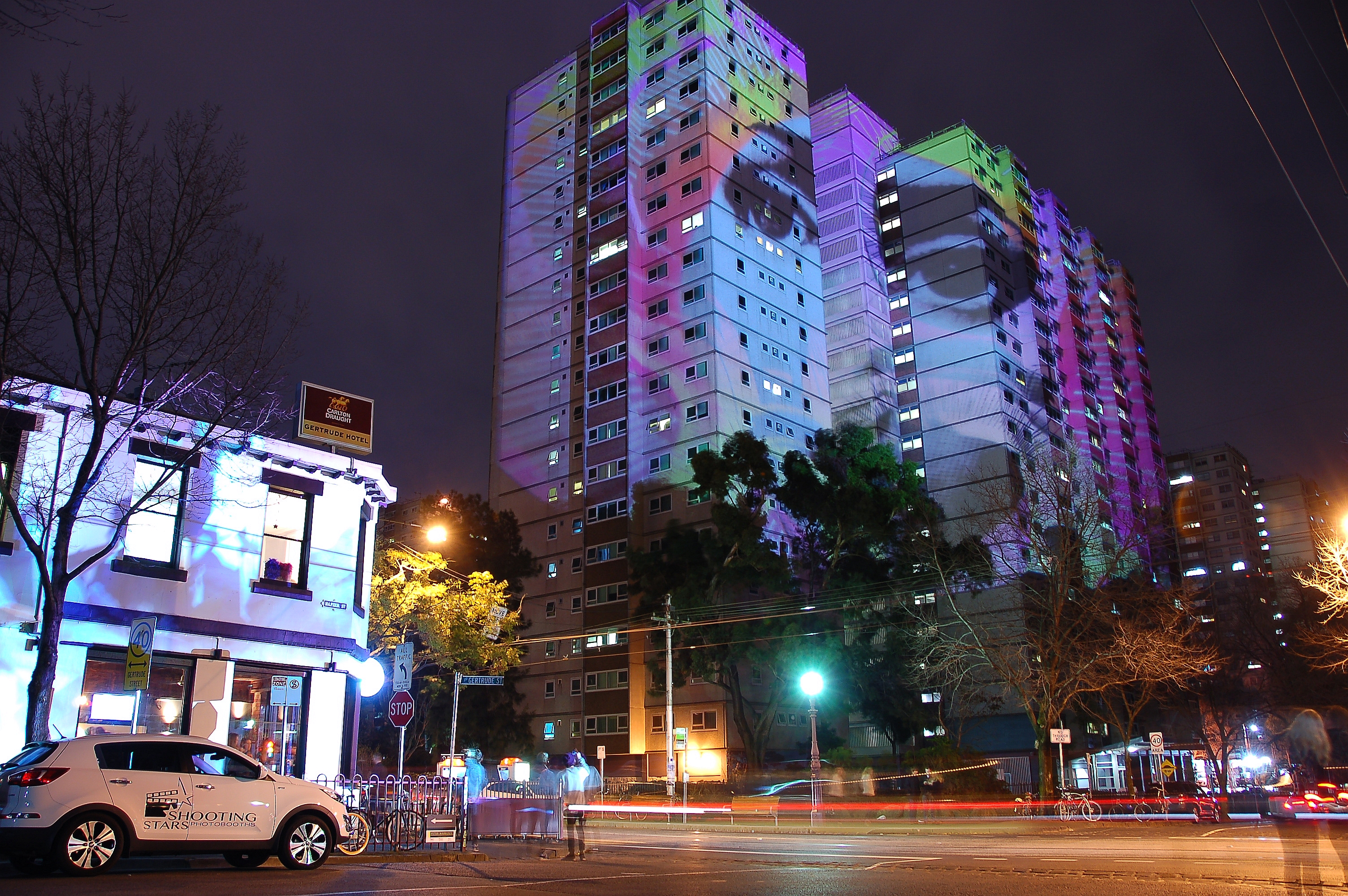
Atherton Gardens towers during the Gertrude Street Projection festival

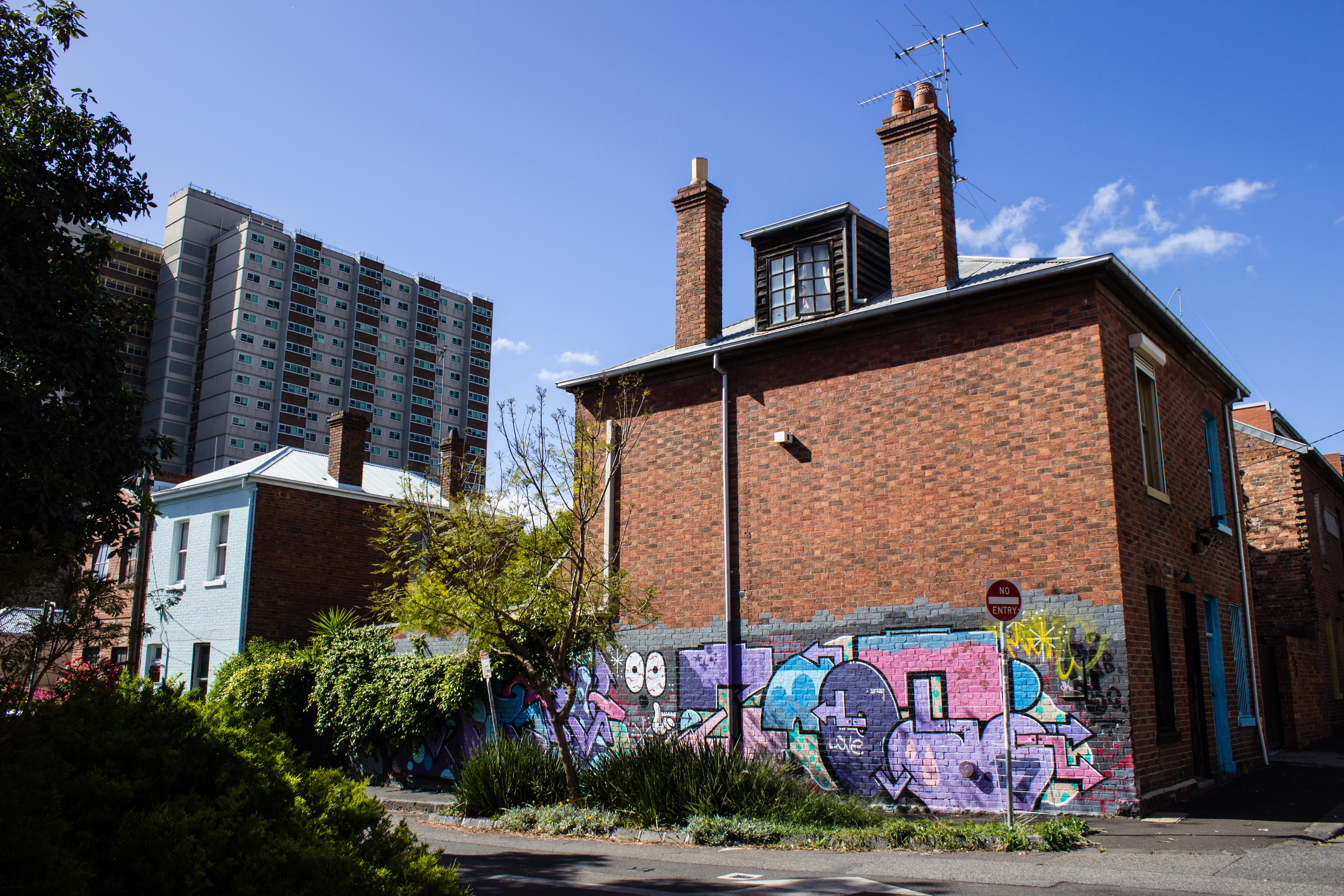
The Atherton Estate towers over nearby heritage buildings in Fitzroy.

=== Post high-rise infill housing period and abolition ===
In 1973 due to mounting criticism of its high-rise program, the Housing Commission announced it would no longer build towers, instead switching to medium density infill (or townhouses) which ironically modelled on the Victorian terraces which were the subject of the original slum clearances of the 1950s. This mode had undergone a revival and was thought more favourable in the long term than the high-rise model. Properties built in this style between 1981 and 1983 in Carlton were awarded the Royal Australian Institute of Architects (Victoria) Enduring Architecture award in 2010 and later recognised with local heritage status.

Production moved to low rise walk-up and single dwelling units, with about 10,000 homes using locally engineered design and erection methods constructed using the technology. Public housing was also built in regional Victorian cities, such as Wangaratta, Wodonga and Geelong.

The Commission became part of a new Ministry of Housing in 1973, and in 1984 the commission structure was abolished in favour of an Office of Housing within the Ministry of Housing and subsequent similar Ministries. In 2023, Public housing is administered by the Department of Families, Fairness and Housing.

== Legacy and Demolition program ==
In September 2023, premier Daniel Andrews announced that all of the 44 1960s public housing towers will be demolished and rebuilt by 2051, with the first 5 to be pulled down by 2031, these being: 2 towers in Flemington (12 Holland Court & 120 Racecourse Road), 1 tower in North Melbourne (33 Alfred Street) and 2 towers in Carlton (20 Elgin Street and 141 Nicholson Street). As of September 2024, the second phase of the high rise redevelopment was Announced with 1 tower in Richmond (139 Highett Street) and 1 tower in South Yarra (259 Malvern Road) will be demolished by 2032. In January 2026, seven towers were announced to be pulled down and those towers are for the elderly located in Flemington, St Kilda, Prahran, North Melbourne and Albert Park and Kensington.

== Victorian Public Tenants Association ==
Victoria is the only State which has a peak body to represent people who live in public housing, and people on the waiting list. The Victorian Public Tenants Association was first formed in 2000 as a peak body for Tenant Groups. The organisation now represents people who live in public housing individually, as well as those who have applications on the joint public and community housing waitlist, the Victorian Housing Register.

They operate a free telephone advice line, as well as advocate directly for system wide improvements to policies and procedures, urgent construction of more public housing and on other social justice issues that impact on people who are homeless, insecurely housed or living in public housing.

== COVID-19 lockdowns and class action ==
During the COVID-19 pandemic, from July 4 to July 18 2020, the Victorian government locked down 9 housing commission towers in the Hotham (North Melbourne) and Debney (Flemington) estates due to an outbreak there which rapidly spread through those communities. The tower at 33 Alfred Street, North Melbourne in particular was subject to a "hard lockdown" due to more than 11% of residents being found to be positive. The harsh detention sparked an investigation into treatment of the residents; following the arrival of police, residents there were not able to source food or essential medicines for 14 days. This resulted in a $5 million class action involving 3,000 residents. The government refused to apologise for its actions despite the ombudsman ruling that it was a human rights violation.

== See also ==
- Public housing in Australia
- HomeGround Services
- Bendigo street housing campaign
