= Department of Jobs, Precincts and Regions =

Government department in Victoria, Australia

Department overview
- Formed: 1 January 2019
- Preceding department: Department of Economic Development, Jobs, Transport and Resources
- Dissolved: 31 December 2022
- Superseding agencies: Department of Jobs, Skills, Industry and Regions; Department of Energy, Environment and Climate Action
- Jurisdiction: Victoria, Australia
- Ministers responsible: Martin Pakula, Minister for Business Precincts, Minister for Industry Support and Recovery, Minister for Racing, Minister for Trade, Minister for Tourism, Sport and Major Events; Jaala Pulford, Minister for Employment, Minister for Innovation, Medical Research and the Digital Economy, Minister for Small Business; Mary-Anne Thomas, Minister for Agriculture, Minister for Regional Development; Jaclyn Symes, Minister for Resources; Danny Pearson, Minister for Creative Industries; Shaun Leane, Minister for Local Government, Minister for Suburban Development; Ros Spence, Minister for Community Sport
- Department executive: Simon Phemister, Secretary

The Department of Jobs, Precincts and Regions (DJPR) was a department in Victoria, Australia. Commencing operation on 1 January 2019, the DJPR supported six ministers across 10 portfolios, broadly related to economic development.

Along with the Department of Transport (DoT), DJPR was created in machinery of government changes following the return of the Labor government led by Premier Daniel Andrews at the 2018 state election, in which the Department of Economic Development, Jobs, Transport and Resources (DEDJTR) was divided into two new departments. Following the resignation of Richard Bolt as Secretary of DEDJTR, Simon Phemister was appointed Acting Secretary, and continued as permanent Secretary of the new department.

In addition to the non-transport functions of DEDJTR, DJPR also took on responsibility for suburban development from the Department of Environment, Land, Water and Planning; racing from the Department of Justice and Regulation (itself renamed to the Department of Justice and Community Safety); and Sport and Recreation Victoria from the Department of Health and Human Services.

The department was replaced by the Department of Jobs, Skills, Industry and Regions on 1 January 2023, with the latter taking over almost all responsibilities except resources and agriculture, which were transferred to the Department of Energy, Environment and Climate Action and local government, which was transferred to the Department of Government Services. The new department also took over responsibilities for skills, training and higher education from the Department of Education and Training.

== Ministers ==
As of June 2022, the DJPR supports seven ministers in the following portfolios:

Name	Party	Portfolio
Martin Pakula	Labor	Minister for Business Precincts; Minister for Industry Support and Recovery; Minister for Racing; Minister for Trade; Minister for Tourism, Sport and Major Events
Jaala Pulford	Labor	Minister for Employment; Minister for Innovation, Medical Research and the Digital Economy; Minister for Small Business
Mary-Anne Thomas	Labor	Minister for Agriculture; Minister for Regional Development
Jaclyn Symes	Labor	Minister for Resources
Shaun Leane	Labor	Minister for Local Government; Minister for Suburban Development
Danny Pearson	Labor	Minister for Creative Industries
Ros Spence	Labor	Minister for Community Sport

== Functions ==
The DJPR had responsibility for the following policy areas:

- Economic development
- Industry
- Agriculture
- Creative industries
- Employment
- Major events and tourism
- Industrial relations
- Mining and resources
- Regional development
- Small business
- Racing
- Sport and recreation
- Suburban development
- Trade and investment
- Local government
