= Andrew Crisp =

Australian police officer

Andrew Crisp AM APM

Emergency Management Commissioner, Emergency Management Victoria
- In office 13 August 2018 – 4 August 2023
- Preceded by: Craig Lapsley

Personal details
- Occupation: Senior public servant; Police officer

Andrew Crisp AM APM is a senior public servant and former police officer in Australia who has provided active service to United Nations, Victoria Police and Emergency Management Victoria. Crisp has served as the Emergency Management Commissioner for Victoria from 13 August 2018 to 4 August 2023. Rick Nugent commenced as Commissioner following Crisp's retirement from the role.

Crisp previously held the position of Deputy Commissioner of Regional Operations of Victoria Police, appointed to this position by Chief Commissioner Graham Ashton in November 2015, after having served Victoria Police for 37 years. Prior to serving as Deputy Commissioner, Crisp served as Assistant Commissioner of State Emergencies and Security Command.

In May 2025, Crisp was appointed the chair of the Ambulance Victoria Board commencing in July 2025. Crisp had earlier been on the board as a director commencing in June 2024, and stepped down to act as an interim Chief Executive Officer of Ambulance Victoria from 21 August 2024 to 30 June 2025.

Crisp is a Returned Peacekeeping Veteran, having served in East Timor with the Australian Federal Police. Crisp also served in a capacity building mission to PNG.

Crisp was awarded the Australian Police Medal in the 2012 Australia Day Honours. In 2022, Crisp was appointed Member of the Order of Australia in the 2022 Queen's Birthday Honours for "significant service to the emergency management sector in Victoria".

Public service appointments
Preceded by Craig Lapsley	Emergency Management Commissioner, Emergency Management Victoria; 2018 – present	Incumbent
Police appointments
Preceded by	Deputy Commissioner of Regional Operations, Victoria Police; 2015 – 2018	Succeeded by
