= Department of Health (Victoria) =

Department of the government of Victoria, Australia

Department overview
- Formed: 1 February 2021
- Preceding Department: Department of Health and Human Services
- Employees: 4,342 (June 2021)
- Annual budget: $26.5 billion (FY 2020-21)
- Ministers responsible: Mary-Anne Thomas, Minister for Health, Minister for Health Infrastructure, Minister for Medical Research; Gabrielle Williams, Minister for Mental Health, Minister for Ambulance Services; Lizzie Blandthorn, Minister for Disability, Ageing and Carers
- Department executive: Secretary, Euan Wallace
- Website: www.health.vic.gov.au

The Department of Health (DH) is a department of the Government of Victoria. It was formed from the splitting of Department of Health and Human Services into the DH and the Department of Families, Fairness and Housing, in response to the COVID-19 pandemic. The DH is focused on delivery of health and wellbeing services throughout Victoria.

The department commenced operations on 1 February 2021 with Euan Wallace, previously acting secretary of DHHS, as its inaugural secretary, and Martin Foley as the coordinating minister at the time.

== Ministers ==
As of January 2023, the department supports three ministers in the following portfolio areas:

Name	Party	Portfolio
Mary-Anne Thomas	Labor	Minister for Health; Minister for Health Infrastructure; Minister for Medical Research
Gabrielle Williams	Labor	Minister for Mental Health; Minister for Ambulance Services
Lizzie Blandthorn	Labor	Minister for Disability, Ageing and Carers
