= Frank Heath (architect) =

Australian architect and planner (1907–1980)

Frank Heath (1907–1980) was a prominent Australian architect and planner of the mid twentieth century. Heath is notable for his contributions to the planning of Victoria through his work with the Housing Commission of Victoria, his private practice, publications and work with the Town and Country Planning Association of Victoria.
