= Department of Health and Human Services (Victoria) =

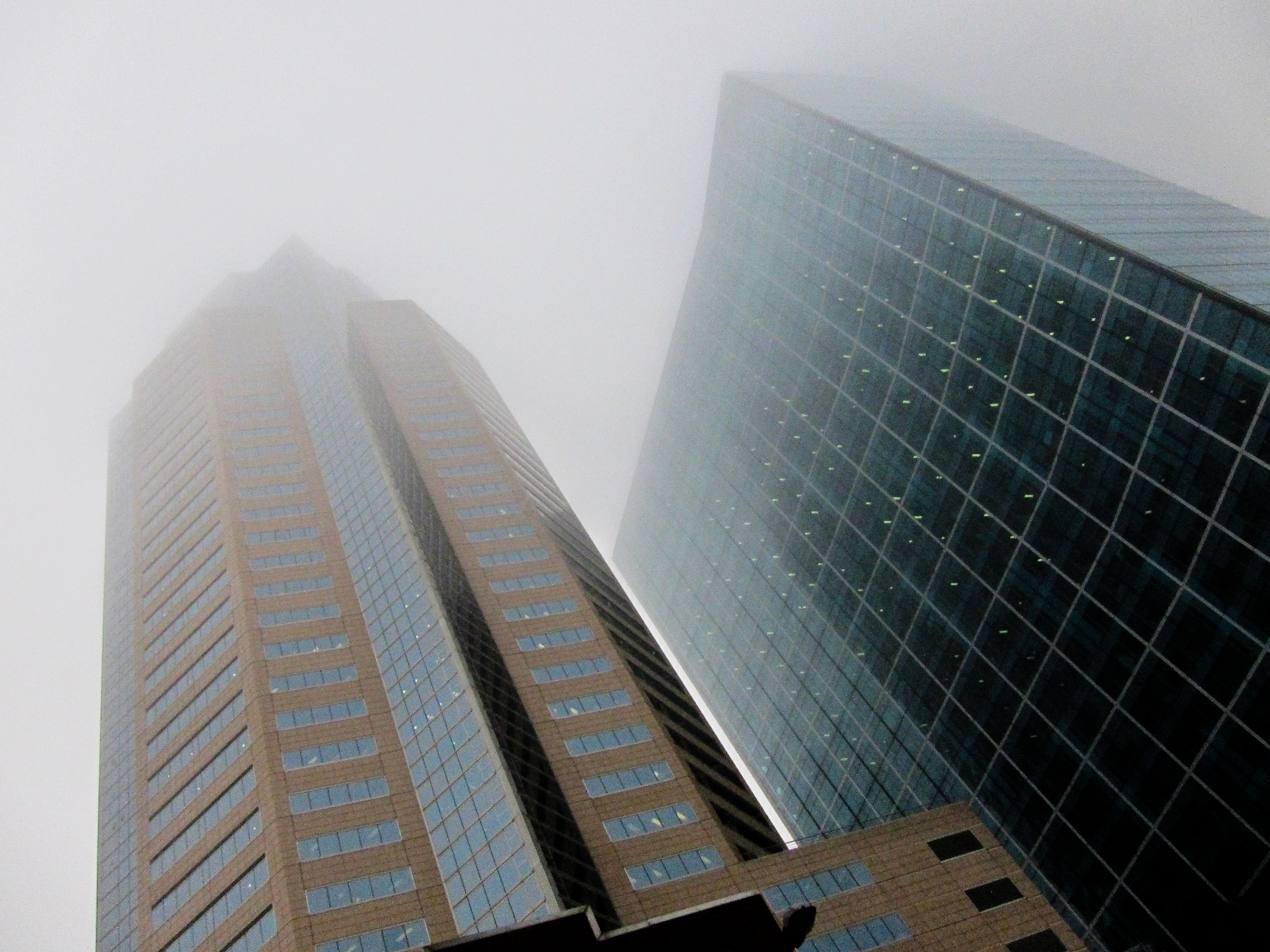

Department overview
- Formed: 1 January 2015
- Preceding agencies: Department of Health III; Department of Human Services
- Dissolved: 1 February 2021
- Superseding agencies: Department of Health IV; Department of Families, Fairness and Housing
- Jurisdiction: Victoria, Australia
- Headquarters: 50 Lonsdale Street, Melbourne, Victoria 3000
- Employees: 8,732 (June 2020)
- Annual budget: $22.0 billion (FY 2019–20)
- Ministers responsible: Martin Foley, Minister for Health & Minister for Ambulance Services; James Merlino, Minister for Mental Health; Richard Wynne, Minister for Housing; Luke Donnellan, Minister for Child Protection & Minister for Disability, Ageing and Carers; Gabrielle Williams, Minister for the Prevention of Family Violence
- Department executive: Professor Euan Wallace AM, Secretary
- Website: dhhs.vic.gov.au

The Department of Health and Human Services (DHHS) was a government department in Victoria, Australia. Commencing operation on 1 January 2015, it was responsible for the state's health system, as well as various other aspects of social policy.

The DHHS was formed following machinery of government changes in the aftermath of the 2014 state election, assuming the functions of the previous Department of Health and Department of Human Services, respectively.

After further re-structures in January 2019, the department's responsibilities relating to sport and recreation were instead transferred to the newly created Department of Jobs, Precincts and Regions.

On 30 November 2020, the Premier announced that Health and Human Services functions would be separated into a new Department of Health (DoH) and the Department of Families, Fairness and Housing (DFFH). The new DoH would oversee public health, aging, mental health and ambulance service portfolios while DFFH would hold responsibility for child protection, housing and disability. As part of this change, DFFH would gain a number of functions that currently reside with The Department of Premier and Cabinet. The split took effect on 1 February 2021.

== Ministers ==
Until its dissolution, the DHHS supported five ministers in the following portfolio areas:

Name	Party	Portfolio
Martin Foley	Labor	Minister for Health; Minister for Ambulance Services
James Merlino	Labor	Minister for Mental Health
Richard Wynne	Labor	Minister for Housing
Luke Donnellan	Labor	Minister for Child Protection; Minister for Disability, Ageing and Carers
Gabrielle Williams	Labor	Minister for the Prevention of Family Violence

== Functions ==
The DHHS has responsibility for the following policy areas:

- Public health
- Ambulance services
- Housing
- Mental health
- Child protection
- Family services
- Disability services
- Ageing
- Family violence
- Community health
