= Health Purchasing Victoria =

Health Purchasing Victoria is an Australian public authority established in 2001 by an amendment to the Victorian Health Services Act 1988, and has a responsibility to facilitate reform of the procurement system for Victorian hospitals and health services. It is an independent statutory authority responsible to the Minister of Health.

Public hospitals and health services in the state of Victoria have a differing legal status to their counterparts in all other Australian States. In Victoria, "public" hospitals and health services, that is, primary, secondary and tertiary health care centres funded predominantly by government grants, are separate legal entities. For this reason, the Victorian State Government enacted legislation to create an entity that has the ability to enter into collective commercial contracts for goods and services on best value terms on behalf of public hospitals and health services.
