= Fire Rescue Victoria Training Academy =

Training facility for emergency services personnel in Melbourne, Australia

Coordinates: 37.6184°S 144.9496°E

The Fire Rescue Victoria Training Academy (formerly known as the Victorian Emergency Management Training Centre (VEMTC)) is a training facility for Fire Rescue Victoria professional firefighters. The center is located in Melbourne, Australia's north in Craigieburn.

== History ==
=== 2014 ===
The training center was completed in June 2014 for $109 million and designed by Woods Bagot and HAAGEN. It was built for Metropolitan Fire Brigade (MFB) after 2 years of planning.

=== 2015 ===
It is the primary training center for Metropolitan Fire Brigade (MFB) and their recruit courses and promotional courses.

Following the closure of CFA Fiskville training ground due to health and safety reasons, the centre became the primary training facility for CFA new career fire fighters.

=== 2023 ===
VEMTC is renamed The Fire Rescue Victoria Training Academy.

== Key features ==
The 10 hectare facility has a focus on urban emergency incidents with scenarios for the following settings:

- road
- rail
- tunnel
- marine
- Urban Search and Rescue (USAR)
- High Angle Rescue Team (HART)

There is a large seven-story building or prop which includes a carpark and numerous other types of environments including an atrium, prison and hospital themes.
