= Department of Energy, Environment and Climate Action =

Government department in Victoria, Australia

Department overview
- Formed: 1 January 2023
- Preceding agencies: Department of Environment, Land, Water and Planning; Department of Jobs, Precincts and Regions
- Jurisdiction: Victoria, Australia
- Headquarters: 8 Nicholson Street, East Melbourne, Victoria 3002
- Ministers responsible: Lily D'Ambrosio, Minister for Climate Action Minister for Energy and Resources Minister for the State Electricity Commission; Steve Dimopoulos, Minister for Environment; Harriet Shing, Minister for Water; Ros Spence, Minister for Agriculture
- Department executive: John Bradley, Secretary
- Child Department: State Electricity Commission of Victoria
- Website: deeca.vic.gov.au

The Department of Energy, Environment and Climate Action (DEECA) is a government department in Victoria, Australia. It is responsible for various matters related to the environment, energy and climate change.

The department was renamed from the Department of Environment, Land, Water and Planning on 1 January 2023. It was created in the aftermath of the 2022 state election, with Premier Daniel Andrews announcing that several portfolios would be changing. Responsibilities such as urban planning were ceded to the new Department of Transport and Planning, while other responsibilities from other agencies such as agriculture, resources and energy programs were transferred from the Department of Jobs, Precincts and Regions to the DEECA.

== Ministers ==
As of October 2023, the DEECA supports four ministers in the following portfolio areas:

Name	Party	Portfolio
Lily D'Ambrosio	Labor	Minister for Climate Action; Minister for Energy and Resources; Minister for the State Electricity Commission
Steve Dimopoulos	Labor	Minister for Environment
Harriet Shing	Labor	Minister for Water
Ros Spence	Labor	Minister for Agriculture

== Responsibilities ==
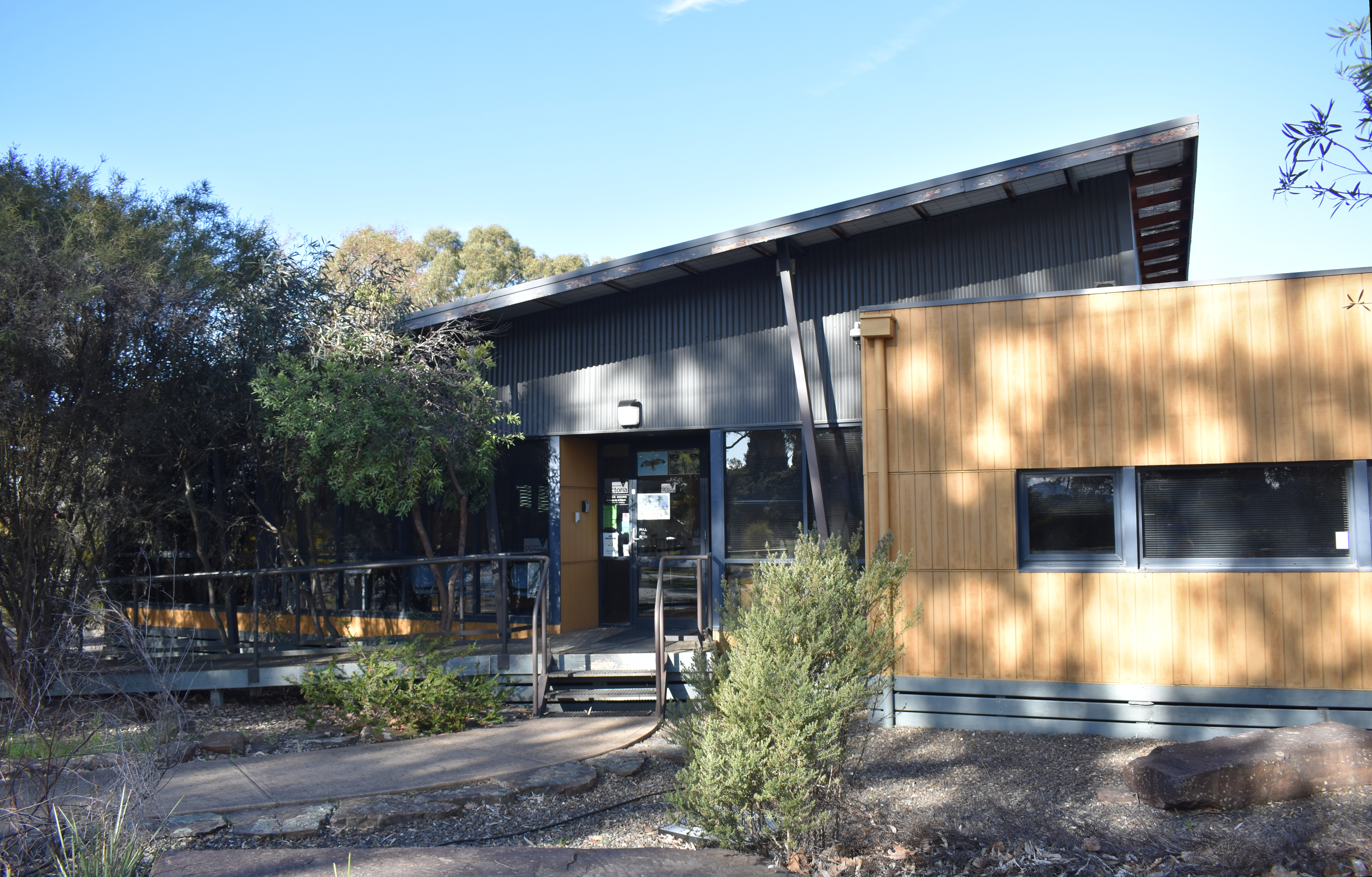
Offices of DEECA in Mansfield

DEECA has responsibility for the following policy areas:

- Environment
- Energy
- Wildlife
- Heritage
- Climate change
- Waste and resource recovery
- Mining and resources
- Agriculture
- Marine and coasts
- Water and catchments
- Forest Fire Management Victoria (an agency for Bush firefighting)
- Reestablishment of the State Electricity Commission of Victoria
