= Department of Government Services (Victoria) =

State government department in Australia

Department overview
- Formed: 1 January 2023
- Jurisdiction: Victoria
- Ministers responsible: Enver Erdogan, Minister for Government Services; Tim Richardson, Minister for Local Government, Minister for Consumer Affairs, Minister for Renters
- Department executive: Jo de Morton, Secretary
- Child department: Consumer Affairs Victoria
- Website: www.vic.gov.au/department-government-services

The Department of Government Services (DGS) is a government department in Victoria, Australia. It was formed on 1 January 2023 as a result of a cabinet reshuffle by Premier of Victoria Daniel Andrews.

Upon establishment, the department took over the responsibilities for local government from the Department of Jobs, Precincts and Regions.

== Ministers ==
As of August 2026, the department supports two ministers in the following portfolios:

Name	Party	Portfolio
Enver Erdogan	Labor	Minister for Government Services
Tim Richardson	Labor	Minister for Local Government; Minister for Consumer Affairs; Minister for Renters

== Responsibilities ==
The department encompasses various functions such as consumer affairs, municipal government and administration for the public service such as grants management.
