= Department of Families, Fairness and Housing =

State government department of Victoria, Australia

Agency overview
- Formed: 1 February 2021
- Preceding agency: Department of Health and Human Services
- Ministers responsible: Lizzie Blandthorn, Minister for Children (Coordinating Minister) Minister for Disability; Natalie Suleyman, Minister for Veterans Minister for Small Business Minister for Youth; Ros Spence, Minister for Agriculture Minister for Community Sport Minister for Carers and Volunteers; Natalie Hutchins, Minister for Jobs and Industry Minister for Treaty and First Peoples Minister for Women; Harriet Shing, Minister for Housing Minister for Water Minister for Equality; Vicki Ward, Minister for Prevention of Family Violence Minister for Employment; Ingrid Stitt, Minister for Mental Health Minister for Ageing Minister for Multicultural Affairs
- Agency executive: Peta McCammon, Secretary
- Website: www.dffh.vic.gov.au vic.gov.au/department-families-fairness-and-housing

The Department of Families, Fairness and Housing (DFFH) is a department of the Government of Victoria. Formed from the splitting of Department of Health and Human Services in the ongoing response to the COVID-19 pandemic, DFFH holds responsibility for child protection, housing and disability. It also incorporates functions formerly performed by the Department of Premier and Cabinet. These functions included veterans affairs, women and youth, multicultural affairs and LGBTQI+ equality.

DFFH commenced operations on 1 February 2021 with Sandy Pitcher as Secretary of the Department and Richard Wynne as the coordinating minister at the time.

== Ministers ==
As of October 2023, the DFFH supports seven ministers in the following portfolio areas:

Name	Party	Portfolio
Lizzie Blandthorn	Labor	Minister for Children (Coordinating Minister); Minister for Disability
Harriet Shing	Labor	Minister for Housing; Minister for Water; Minister for Equality
Natalie Suleyman	Labor	Minister for Veterans; Minister for Small Business; Minister for Youth
Vicki Ward	Labor	Minister for Prevention of Family Violence; Minister for Employment
Natalie Hutchins	Labor	Minister for Jobs and Industry; Minister for Treaty and First Peoples; Minister for Women
Ingrid Stitt	Labor	Minister for Mental Health; Minister for Ageing; Minister for Multicultural Affairs
Ros Spence	Labor	Minister for Agriculture; Minister for Community Sport; Minister for Carers and Volunteers
