= Financial Reform Division =

Government body in Victoria, Australia

The Financial Reform Division was part of the Department of Treasury and Finance, of the Government of Victoria, in the state of Victoria, Australia. The Financial Reform Division ceased to exist in 2009.

The Financial Reform Division leads and coordinates reforms to financial management approaches and systems to ensure Victoria remains at the forefront of public sector financial management. Current reform initiatives relate to

- operational frameworks for finance and resource management,
- legislation governing the management of public resources, and
- systems to support government decision-making through the collection and production of information and advice.

The Financial Reform Division's deputy secretary is Dean Yates.

== A History of Public Finance in Victoria ==
Program budgeting in Victoria (as well as in other states and countries) initially focused on inputs (such as the number of pens used, the number of phone calls made, etcetera) rather than outputs.

The 1980s and 1990s was a period of reflection about the effectiveness of the public service in carrying out its core functions. Reforms of this period aimed to make the public service more flexible, efficient, and responsive to government direction.

Modern public service became characterised by a stronger focus on objectives with performance being assessed on the basis of results. Private sector management and employment practices were commonly adopted in the public sector.

As of 2009, Victorian public finance still focused on outputs while many other jurisdictions were starting to focus on outcomes. The Victorian model's focus on delivering outputs instead of outcomes was part of a deliberate incremental strategy to emphasise outcomes once the output management framework was in place.

While Victorian public finance legislation does not require the specification of outcomes, in 2001 the Victorian Government released Growing Victoria Together, which sets out its long-term goals (or outcomes), including performance measures for social, environmental, and economic progress. Progress against these performance measures is reported annually in the Growing Victoria Together Progress Report published in the budget papers.

== The Public Finance Bill Project ==
In October 2008, the Financial Reform Division released a discussion paper detailing its intended reform of financial management in Victoria. The reforms will see

- a focus on outcomes rather than outputs,
- a move to simplify the definition of entities, and
- an attempt to strengthen the relationship between the citizen and the state by increasing transparency and accountability.
