= Spring Street, Melbourne =

Street in Melbourne, Victoria

Spring Street Victoria
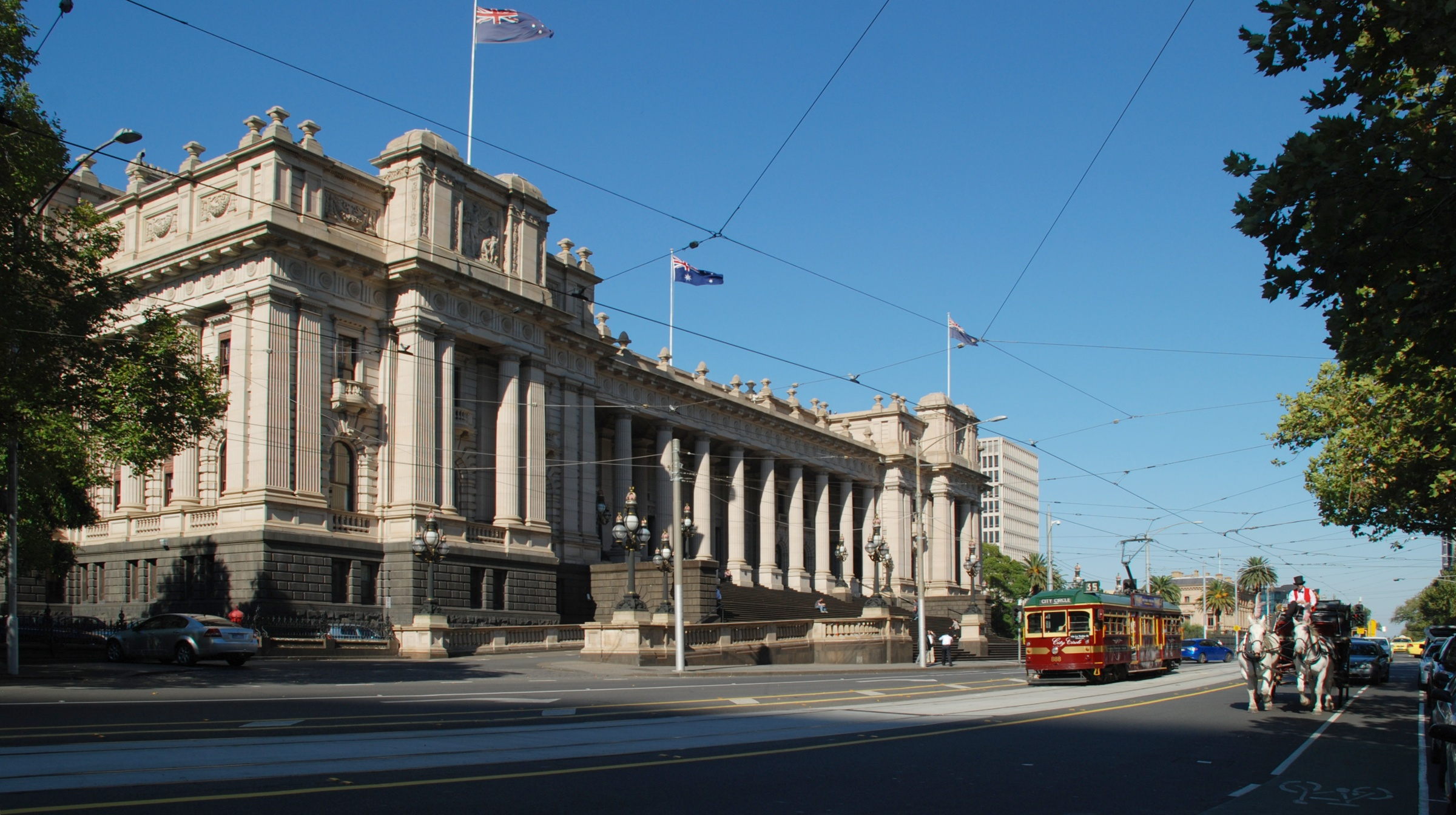
- Parliament House on Spring Street, looking east
- Coordinates: 37.8116°S 144.9732°E

General information
- Type: Street
- Length: 850 m (0.5 mi)
- Opened: 1837

Major junctions
- North end: Nicholson Street; Fitzroy, Melbourne
- Lonsdale Street; Bourke Street; Macarthur Street; Collins Street
- South end: Flinders Street; Melbourne CBD

Location(s)
- LGA(s): City of Melbourne
- Suburb(s): FitzroyMelbourne CBD

Spring Street is a major street in the Melbourne central business district, Australia. It runs roughly north-south and is the easternmost street in the original 1837 Hoddle Grid.

Spring Street is known as the traditional seat of the Government of Victoria, as well as being central to many of the state's major cultural institutions. The street's name is frequently used as a metonym to refer to the state's bureaucracy. Spring Street is also notable for its impressive Victorian architecture, including Parliament House, the Old Treasury Building, the Windsor Hotel (also known as Duchess of Spring Street) and the Princess Theatre.

There are multiple theories regarding the etymology of the street's name. Some think it is named after Baron Thomas Spring Rice, Chancellor of the Exchequer under Lord Melbourne. Another theory is that the name is due to the golden wattle trees being in full bloom during Richard Bourke's visit. The most plausible reason for the name is more simple than that. Spring is a relatively common street name in English-speaking countries and usually chosen for a street due to its proximity to water, or having a slope or rise in terrain.

== Geography ==
The street runs from Flinders Street in the south to Victoria Street and the Carlton Gardens in the north. Nicholson Street branches off from Spring Street, slightly south of its intersection with Lonsdale Street.

== Notable buildings ==
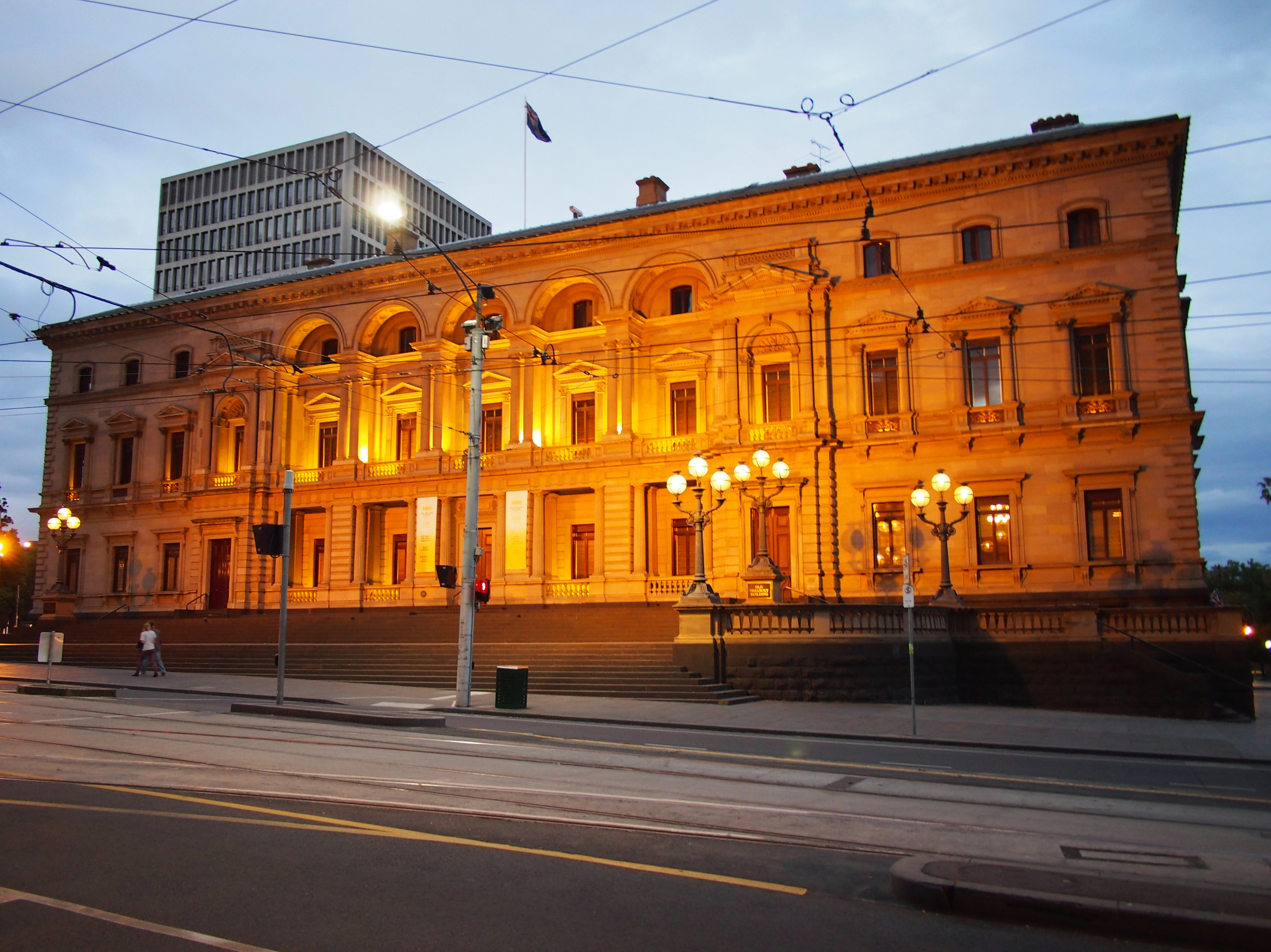
The Old Treasury Building at dusk

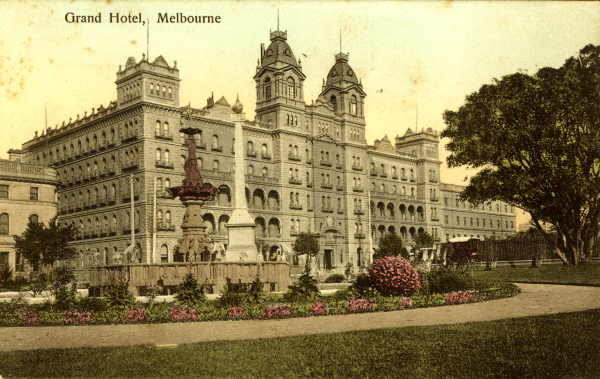
Hotel Windsor viewed from Treasury Place

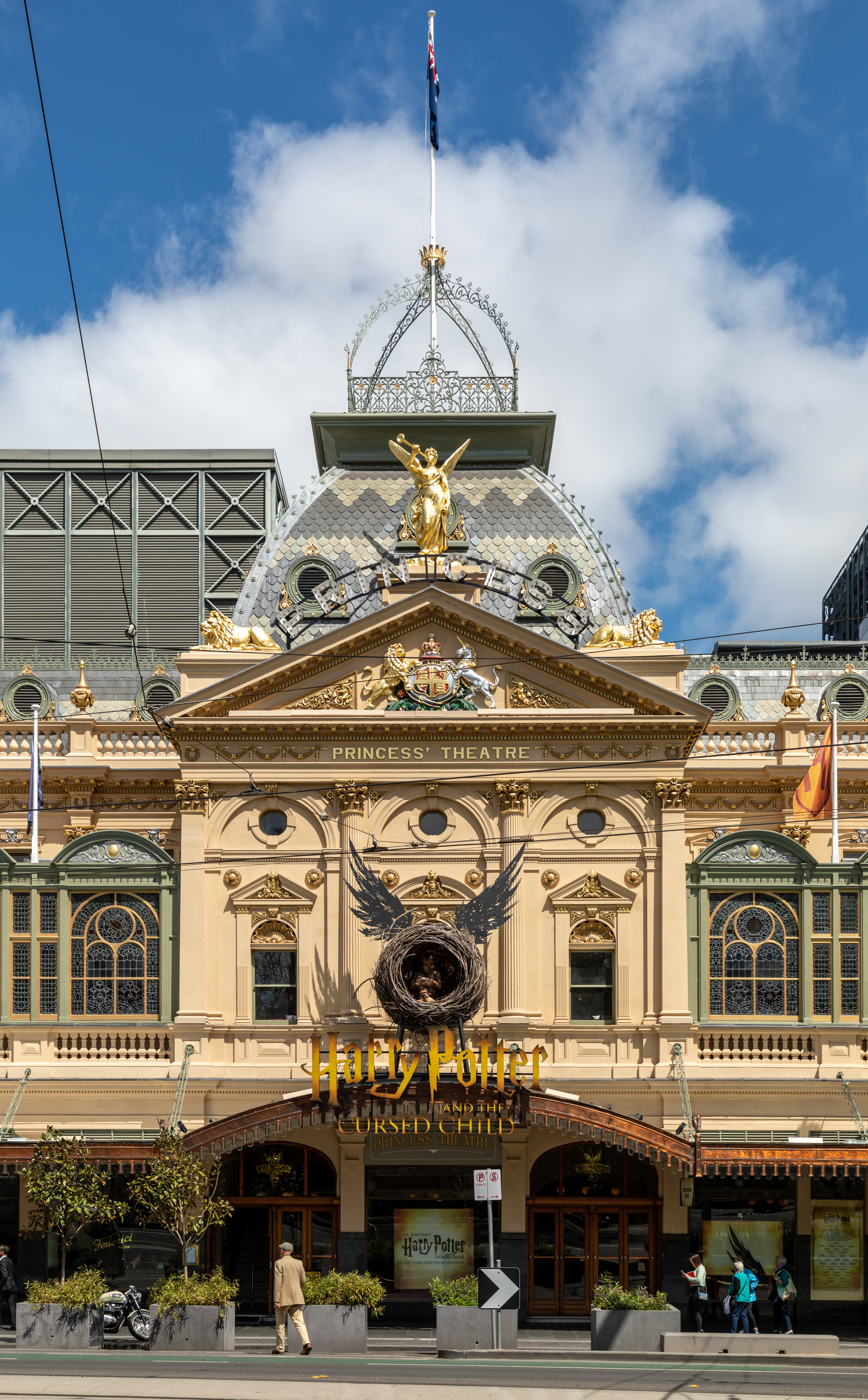
The Princess Theatre

Spring Street has a number of architecturally notable buildings in the style of Renaissance Revival architecture, with many featuring on the Victorian Heritage Register and/or National Trust of Australia. These include:

=== Victorian Heritage Register ===
- Parliament House (1856)*
- Old Treasury Building (1862)*
- Treasury Gardens (1867)*
- Gordon Reserve (1870)*
- Hotel Windsor (1885)*
- Princess Theatre (1886)*
- Alcaston House (1929) an early apartment building designed by A&K Henderson in the palazzo style to complement the wider area
- Royal Australasian College of Surgeons (1935)*
- Shell House

*Also classified by the National Trust

=== National Trust ===
- Holy Name Sisters (1913)

=== Other prominent structures ===
- Parliament railway station (1983) an underground railway station built for the City Loop
- 1 Collins Street (1985) a post-modern tower by Denton Corker Marshall amongst the city's first to incorporate heritage buildings
- Casselden Place (1992) a tall office building which is home to government offices
- Shell House (1988) at the corner of Spring and Flinders Street is a notable granite clad office tower designed by Harry Seidler in a similar style to his buildings in Sydney and Brisbane. The building's floor plates are in the shape of a shell as it was the Australian Head Office of Shell.
- 271 Spring St is a 16-storey tower anchoring the corner of Little Lonsdale and Spring Streets. The modern architecturally-designed office building crafts two existing heritage structures - the Church of England’s Mission Hall and the Elms Hotel, both date back to the early 1900s are preserved and celebrated.

=== Construction underway ===
A 33-storey tower has been approved for construction on the site of 1 Spring st. It will occupy part of the existing northern plaza of Shell House on Flinders Lane and would require the partial demolition the existing Shell House.

== Parks and gardens ==
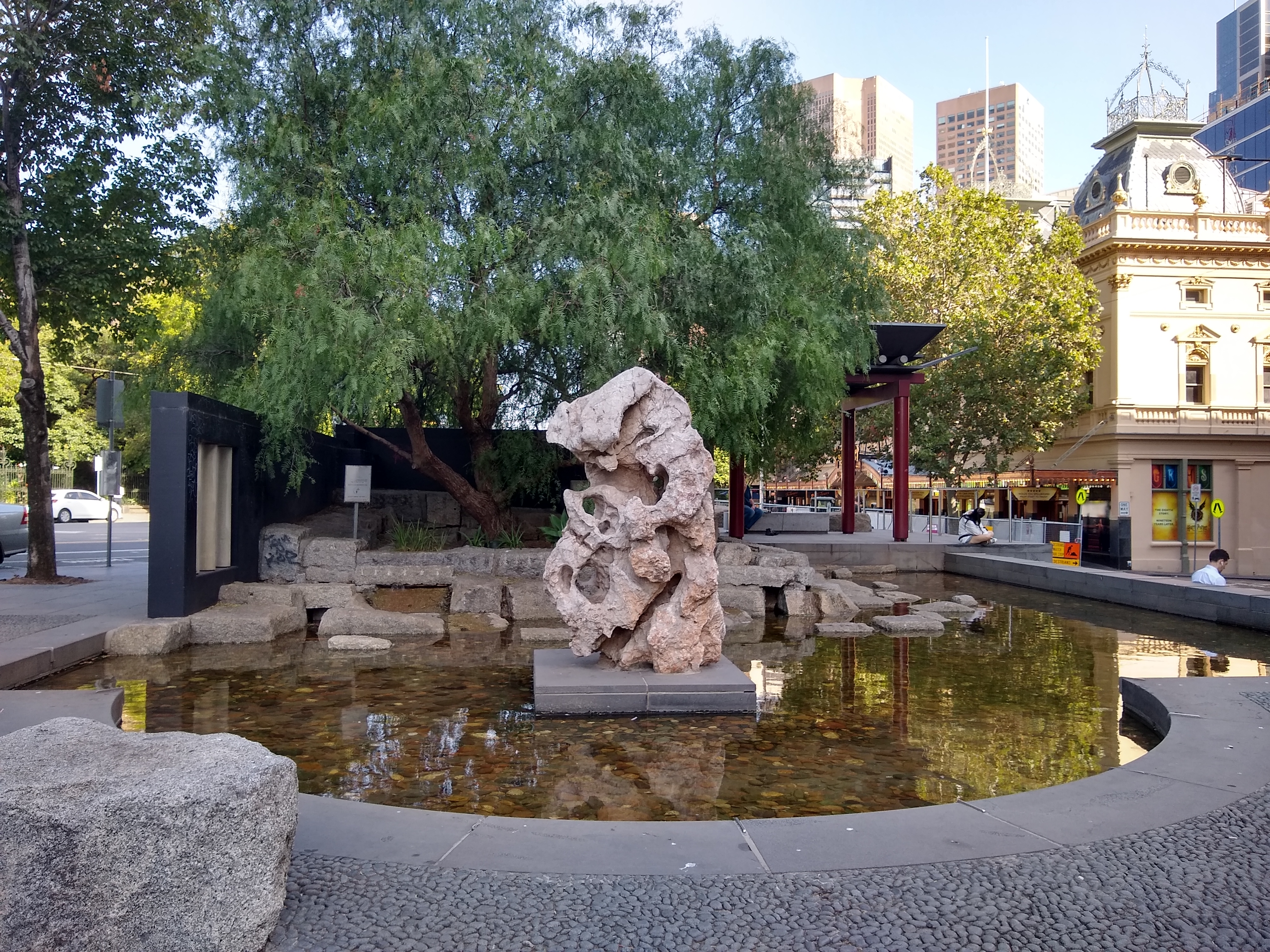
The Tianjin Garden on Spring Street

Spring Street forms the western border of the Treasury Gardens and features multiple gardens and reserves. Gordon Reserve, a small triangle of parkland created in 1863 features heritage listed statues and a fountain which was built and designed by a Pentridge prisoner.

A small Chinese garden, known as the Tianjin Garden, is located at the northern end of Spring Street. It is a symbol of Melbourne's close friendship with its sister city, Tianjin, China. The Tianjin Garden is designed in the classical Chinese style, Tianjin Gardens features two pairs of carved lions, rocks, water, and trees.

The Royal Australasian College of Surgeons also has small public garden in front of iconic the building, complementing the other green spaces in the vicinity of Parliament station.

== Statues and monuments ==
There are several statues of historical figures on Spring Street, such as the Sir Thomas Blamey Statue, in front of the Old Treasury Building, a memorial to Sir William Clarke in the Treasury Gardens, and the Burke and Wills Monument, also in the Treasury Gardens.

== Transport ==
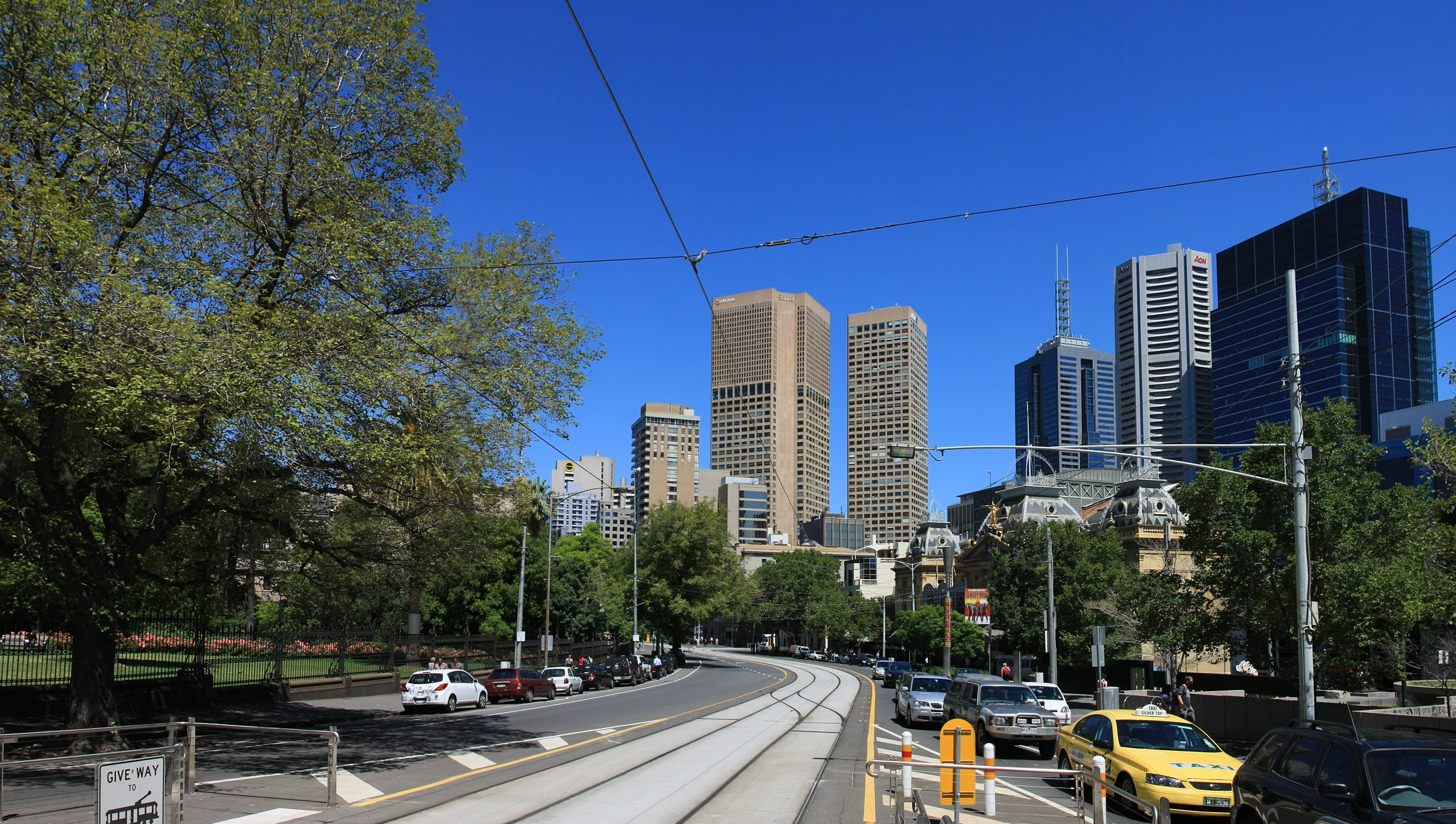
Tram tracks, taxis and cars on Spring Street

A number of tram routes run along Spring Street for all or part of its length, including route 35, route 48, route 86 and route 96.

Parliament railway station, connecting to most suburban Melbourne train lines as part of the underground City Loop, lies directly beneath and parallel to Spring Street.
