= Department of Treasury and Finance (Victoria) =

Victorian state government department

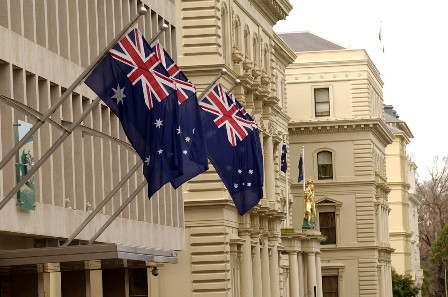
- 1 Treasury Place front entrance

Department overview
- Formed: 31 March 1995
- Preceding agencies: Department of the Treasury; Department of Finance
- Jurisdiction: Victoria, Australia
- Headquarters: 1 Treasury Place, Melbourne
- Ministers responsible: Colin Brooks, Treasurer and Minister for Industrial Relations; Enver Erdogan, Minister for Finance; Steve Dimopoulos, Minister for WorkSafe and the TAC
- Department executive: Camille Kingston, Secretary
- Website: www.dtf.vic.gov.au
- Agency ID: PROV VA 3745

The Department of Treasury and Finance (DTF), often informally referred to as the Treasury, is a government department in Victoria, Australia.

One of Victoria's oldest public institutions, the Treasury has existed in various forms throughout Victorian history. It is currently responsible for the state's economic and fiscal policy, taxation and delivery of the budget.

== History ==
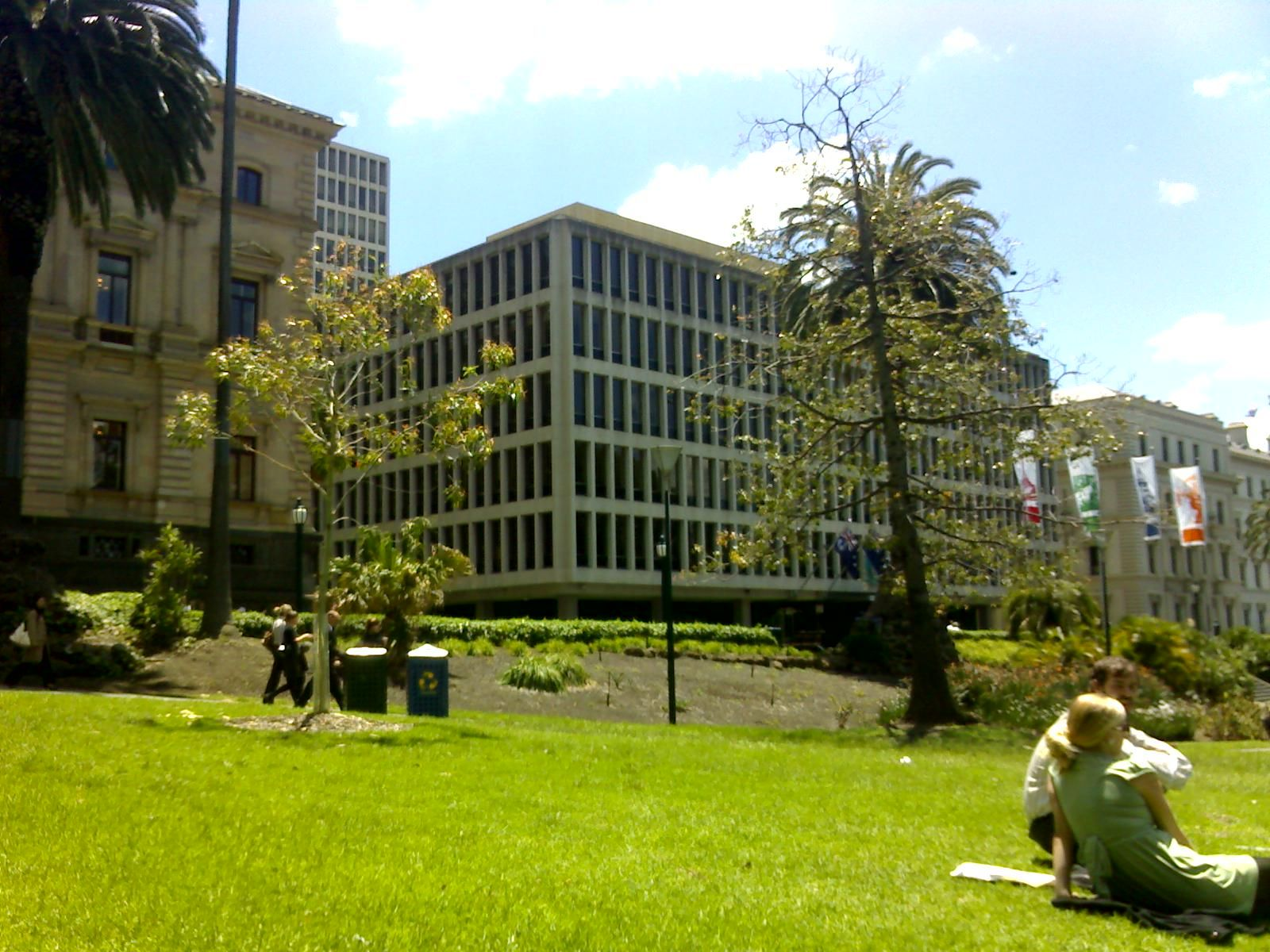
1 Treasury Place from Treasury Gardens

The Department of Treasury and Finance can trace its origins to the earliest days of the settlement that became the State of Victoria. The department is one of Victoria’s oldest institutions, predating the Parliament of Victoria by more than a decade.

As well as being involved in collecting revenue from land sales and customs duty, the treasury became the principal agency responsible for the sale and safe storage of gold extracted from Victoria’s mines in the second half of the nineteenth century (see Victorian Gold Rush).

The building of the treasury (now known as 'the old treasury building'), along with other civic offices like the Parliament, Customs House, and Post Office, was a reaction by authorities who wanted to display state power in Melbourne because of fears of public disorder following the gold rush.

== Buildings ==
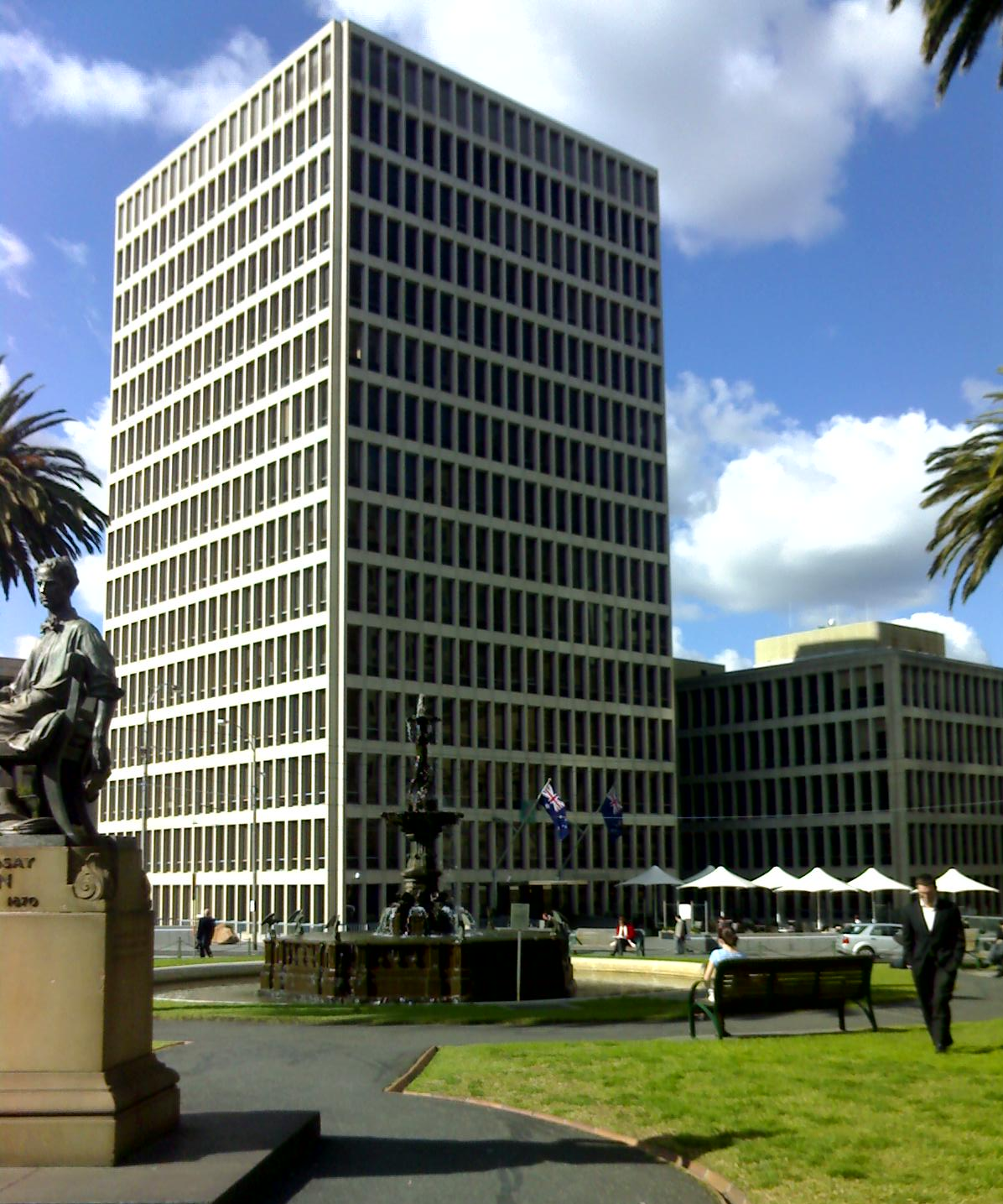
1 Macarthur Street

The Department of Treasury and Finance performs its operations in two main buildings:

- 1 Treasury Place
- 1 Macarthur Street

Barry Patten designed 1 Treasury Place and built it in the 1960s according to the Internationalist style of architecture. The building is also on the Victorian Heritage Register. Since a skyway connects 1 Treasury Place to 1 Macarthur Street, both are often considered to be part of the same building. The whole area linking Parliament House, St Patrick's Cathedral, Fitzroy Gardens, and Treasury Gardens is called the Treasury Reserve, a heritage-listed precinct.

Before 1878, the Victorian Treasury was situated at the corner of Spring Street and Macarthur Street. When the state treasurer and his officers moved to Treasury Place, the old building was renamed the Old Treasury. Old Treasury was widely regarded as the finest 19th century public building in Australia. Upstairs in the building, Treasury officials kept the colony’s accounts. Below, in the basement, were bluestone vaults for storing the gold sent by government escort from the goldmining fields.

== Ministers ==
As of August 2026, the DTF supports three ministers in the following portfolio areas:

Name	Party	Portfolio
Colin Brooks	Labor	Treasurer; Minister for Industrial Relations
Enver Erdogan	Labor	Minister for Finance
Steve Dimopoulos	Labor	Minister for WorkSafe and the TAC

== Naming and functions ==
Name	Details	Dates
The Department of Treasury		1990 – 1995
The Department of the Treasury and Finance	Merging of: The Department of Treasury and the Department of Finance	31 March 1995 – 6 June 1995
The Department of Treasury and Finance	Slight title change from The Department of the Treasury and Finance	6 June 1995 – present (as of December 2025)

The DTF has responsibility for the following policy areas:

- Economic policy
- Fiscal policy
- Revenue policy, including stamp duty, payroll tax and land tax
- Appropriations and budget delivery
- State borrowing, investment and financial arrangements
- Financial reporting and accountability
