= Treasury Gardens =

Public gardens in Melbourne, Australia

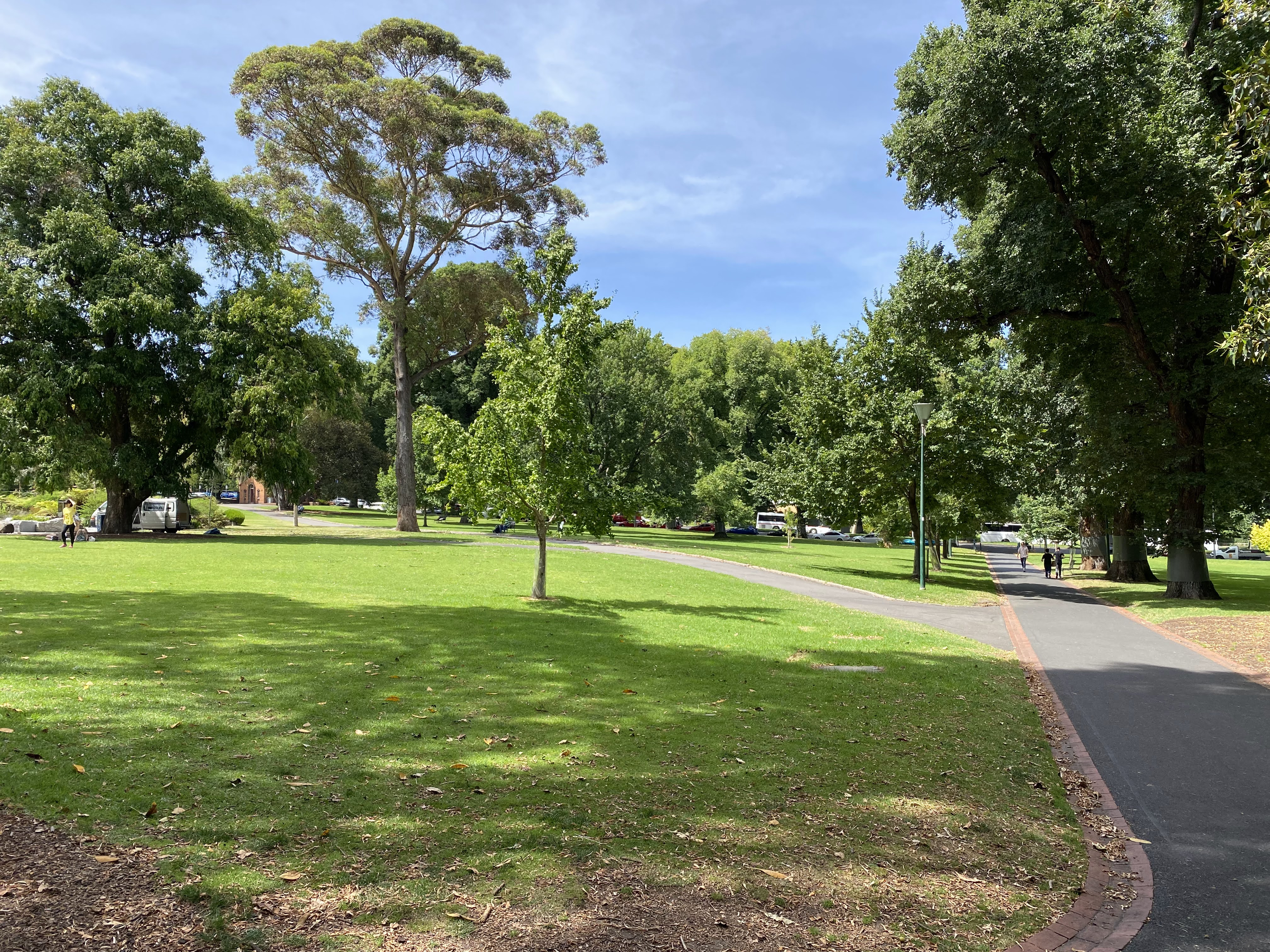
- The gardens during summer, 2023

- Location within Melbourne
- Interactive map of Treasury Gardens
- Type: Urban park
- Location: East Melbourne, Victoria
- Coordinates: 37°48′51″S 144°58′34″E
- Area: 5.8 ha (14 acres)
- Established: 1867; 159 years ago
- Founder: Charles La Trobe
- Designer: Clement Hodgkinson; John Guilfoyle; William Guilfoyle
- Etymology: Old Treasury Building
- Operator: City of Melbourne (since 1929)
- Open: All year
- Status: Open
- Paths: Sealed
- Terrain: Flat
- Vegetation: Australian native; lawns; European gardens
- Public transit: – Parliament; –, – bus
- Landmark memorials: William John Clarke (by Bertram Mackennal, 1902); Robert Burns (by G. A. Lawson, 1904); John F. Kennedy (by Raymond B. Ewers, 1965); Emergency Service (by Rush Wright Associates)
- Facilities: Toilets; drinking fountains; seating
- Website: melbourne.vic.gov.au

Victorian Heritage Register
- Type: Registered place
- Designated: 11 December 2003
- Reference no.: H1887
- Heritage Overlay no.: HO917
- Category: Public art

Register of the National Estate
- Type: Defunct register
- Designated: 21 October 1980
- Reference no.: 100641

The Treasury Gardens is a 5.8-hectare (14-acre) urban park located on the south-eastern side of the Melbourne central business district, in East Melbourne, Victoria, Australia. The gardens are bounded by Wellington Parade, Spring Street, Treasury Place, and by the Fitzroy Gardens across Lansdowne street to the west. The Treasury Gardens form part of a network of city gardens including the Fitzroy, Carlton, and Flagstaff gardens and the Kings Domain.

The Gardens were added to the Victorian Heritage Register in 2003 for their historical, archaeological, social, "aesthetic and scientific (horticultural) importance for its outstanding nineteenth century design, path layout and planting". Together with Fitzroy Gardens, the Treasury Gardens are "… the finest examples of … garden designs in Victoria." The Gardens were also added to a non-statutory heritage list by the Victorian branch of the National Trust; and were listed on the now defunct Register of the National Estate in 1980.

== Description ==
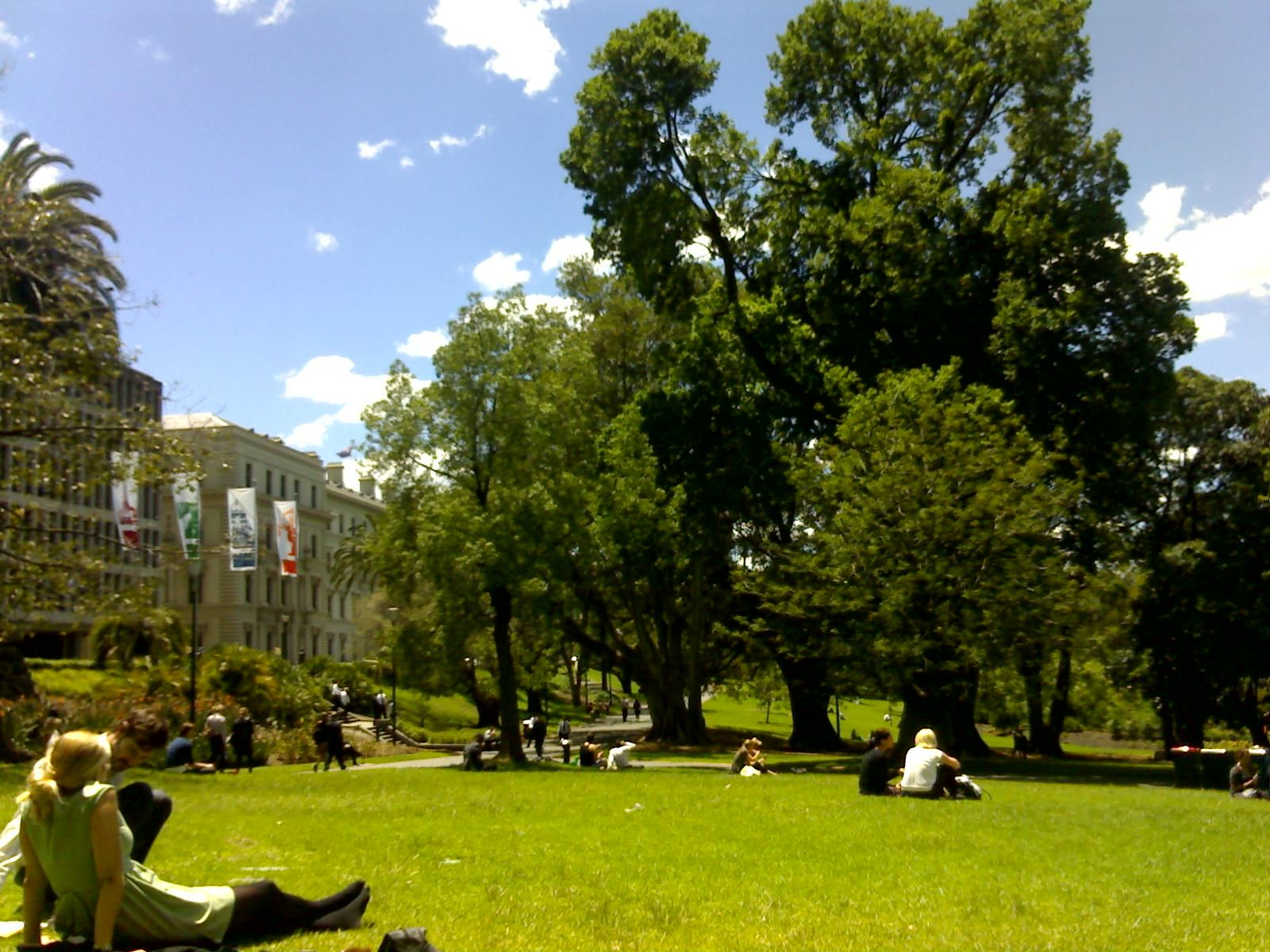
Treasury Gardens is a popular destination for lunch

The Gardens are a short walk from Victoria’s Parliament House and are overlooked by the Old Treasury Building and State Offices. They create a landscaped setting for people to enjoy during lunch with large areas of lawn and walking paths lined with mature trees. Due to their central location in the city, they are a popular spot as the starting or ending point for political rallies, demonstrations and festivals.

Mature tree species include Moreton Bay fig (Ficus macrophylla), deodar cedar (Cedrus deodara), English elm (Ulmus procera), white poplar (Populus alba), Dutch elm (Ulmus x hollandica), Dutch elm (small-leaved form), Port Jackson fig (Ficus rubiginosa), Platanus × hispanica, pedunculate oak (Quercus robur), Agonis flexuosa, Phoenix canariensis, Washingtonia filifera var. robusta, Butia capitata, Chamaerops humilis, river red gum (Eucalyptus camaldulensis), Norfolk Island pine (Araucaria heterophylla), Brachychiton x roseus, and grevillea (Grevillea hilliana). Along the embankment of Treasury Place there are hydrangeas, ivy and flax. The gardens are highly populated with native common brushtail possums that are popular with visitors at night. Other nocturnal native animals include grey-headed flying foxes and insect eating bats. Pacific black ducks, red wattle birds, and silver gulls also are frequently seen.

The gardens contain an ornamental pond and a number of memorials, including:

- Sir William John Clarke Memorial – marble bust, designed by Bertram Mackennal and located by the Treasury building; erected by public subscription and unveiled by the Governor of Victoria on 22 July 1902.
- Robert Burns Memorial – bronze replica sculpture by George Anderson Lawson of an original erected in the poet's birthplace of Alloway in Scotland; commissioned by the Caledonian Society in Melbourne, and first erected on St Kilda Road in 1904, and moved to the Treasury Gardens in 1970 due to roadworks.
- John F. Kennedy Memorial – bronze bas-relief by sculptor Raymond B. Ewers; erected in 1965 and located beside the specially landscaped pond and water fountain.
- Victorian Emergency Service Memorial – completed in 2022 to honour fallen members from Country Fire Authority, Fire Rescue Victoria, VICSES, Forest Fire Management Victoria, Ambulance Victoria, Life Saving Victoria and Marine Search and Rescue (Victoria); designed by Rush Wright Associates.

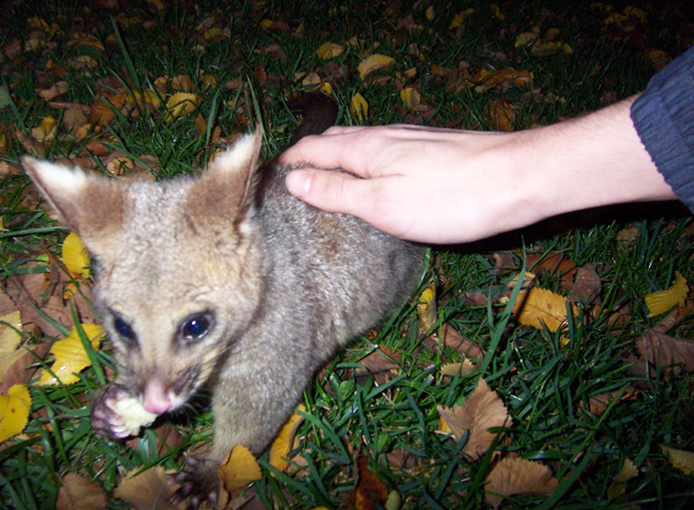
A tame possum in the Treasury Gardens

== History ==
Originally, the area of the Gardens was left as open space after failure to sell allotments due to the swampy nature of the land and it was set aside as a public reserve in 1851 by Charles La Trobe. The Gardens were formally proclaimed in 1867, designed by Clement Hodgkinson in a pattern of diagonally crossing paths lined with trees, creating a cathedral-like effect. Hodgkinson chose trees for practicality rather than style, resulting in an Italian Renaissance-styled garden. His designs also incorporated the planting of willow trees around an ornamental pond. He ceased as curator in 1874.

John Guilfoyle served as curator of the Gardens between 1891 and 1909. He was a brother of William Guilfoyle, the director of the Royal Botanic Gardens, Melbourne. As curator, Guilfoyle was attributed with the expansion of the nursery, increasing the production of shrubs and foliage plants. He initiated removal of an iron railing that fenced the lawns and flower beds, he constructed flower beds in various shapes, eg. a map of Australia, and he initiated with ribbon planting and carpet bedding. His brother, William, transformed the ornamental pond into a Japanese Garden — demolished after World War II.

Managed by the Lands Department up until 1929, management of the Gardens was transferred to the City of Melbourne. The Gardens were a focal point for celebration of the 1934 Centenary of Melbourne and the 1939 construction of a toilet block was acknowledged as being of "architectural importance for its uncommon art deco design, decorative pattern brick and tile construction and extensive use of wrought iron detailing, including grills, gates, lamps, signs and brick planter, exhibiting outstanding craftsmanship."

A horse hitching post was installed in the Gardens in 1971; relocated from 85 Spring Street; dated from c. 1900.

The City of Melbourne adopted a Master Plan for both the Fitzroy and Treasury Gardens in 1996.

Approximately 100,000 people gathered in the Treasury Gardens for the Global Climate Strike in 1999.

== Events ==
The Share the Spirit Festival, created by Songlines Aboriginal Music in 2003, is held on Australia Day (26 January) each year. It features a wide variety of music by Indigenous Australian musicians, and is supported by the City of Melbourne, the Department of Justice, Creative Victoria, and other partners.

== Gallery ==
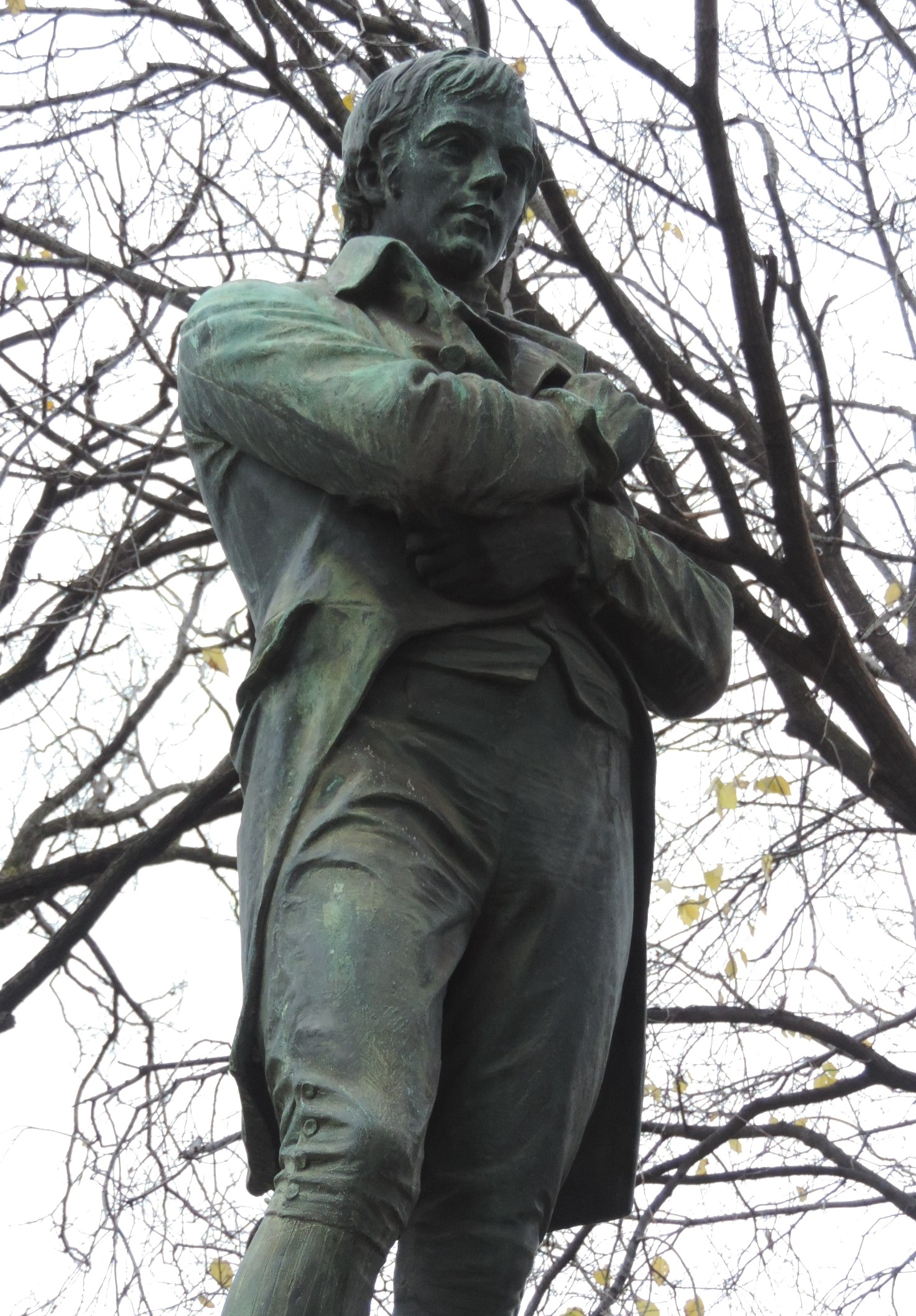
Robert Burns statue

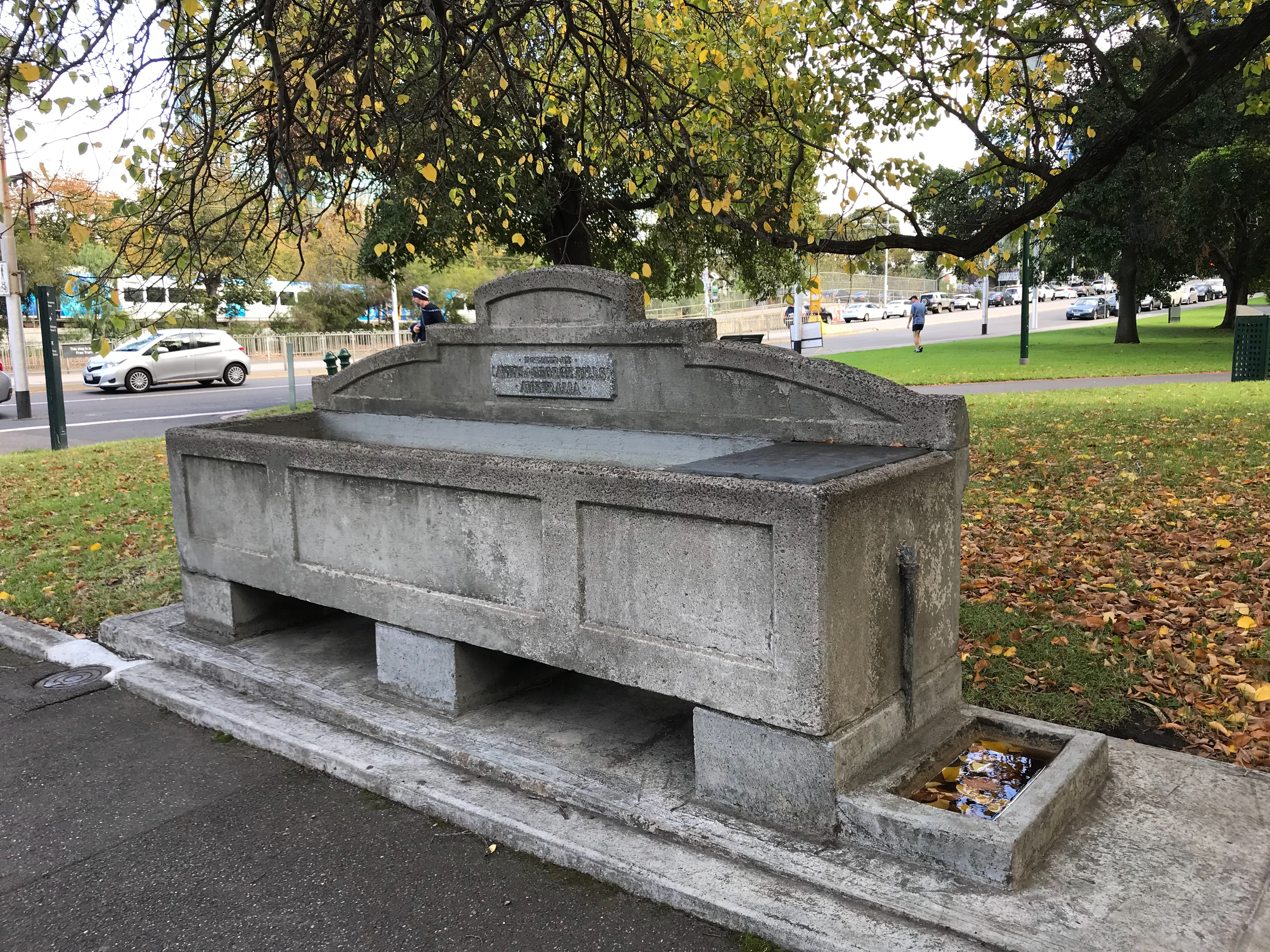
Bills Horse Trough

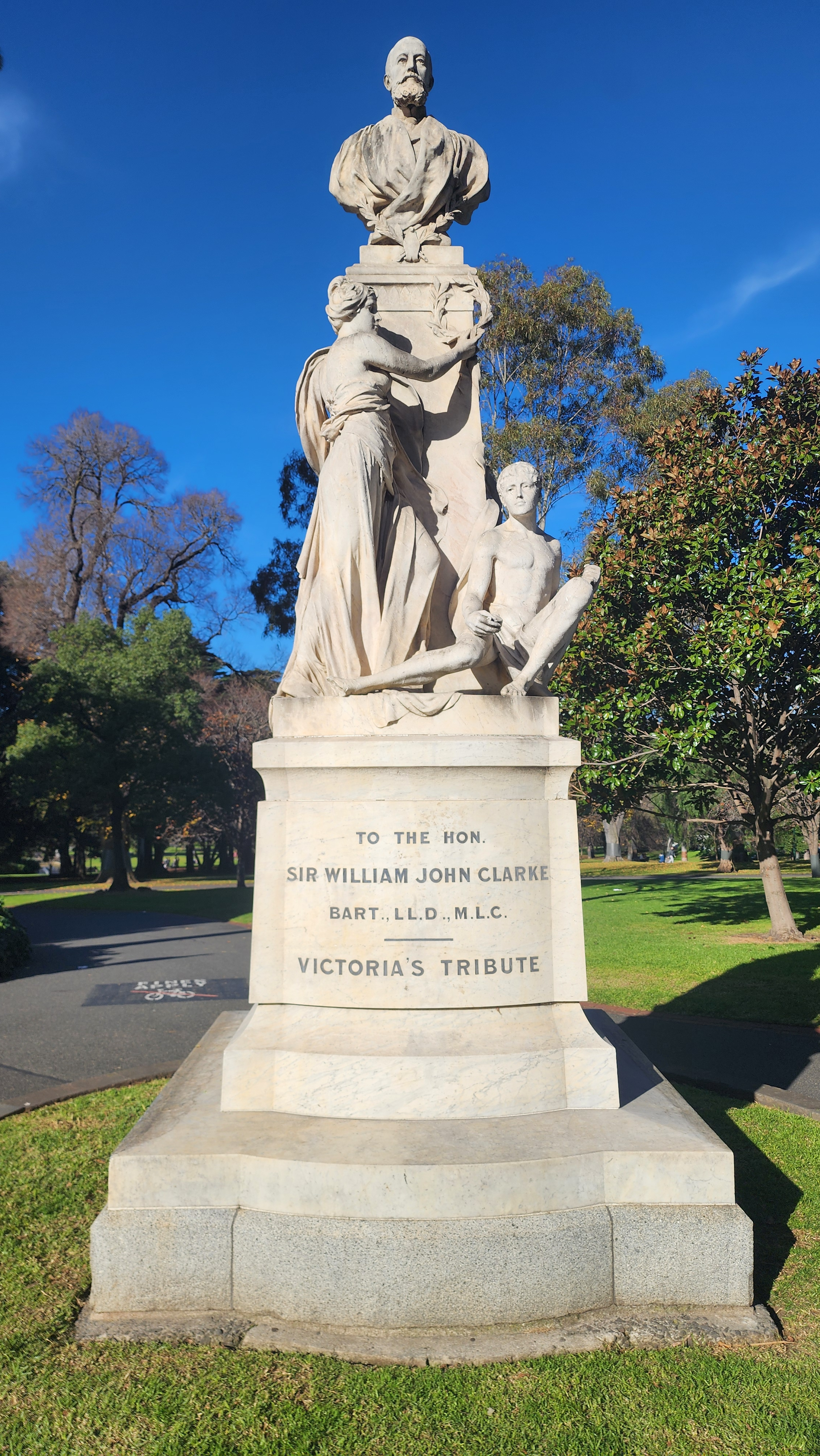
William John Clarke statue

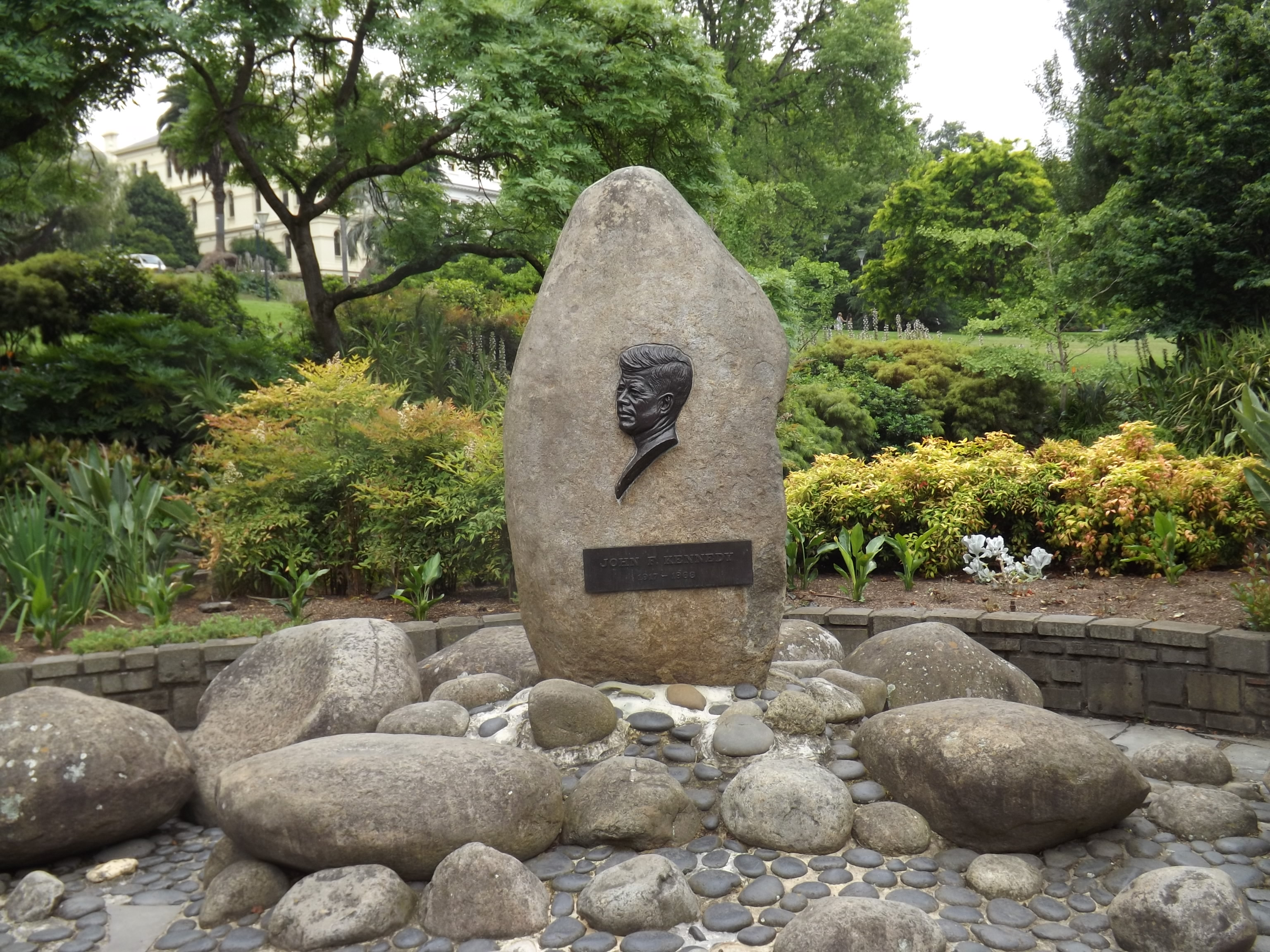
President John F. Kennedy Memorial

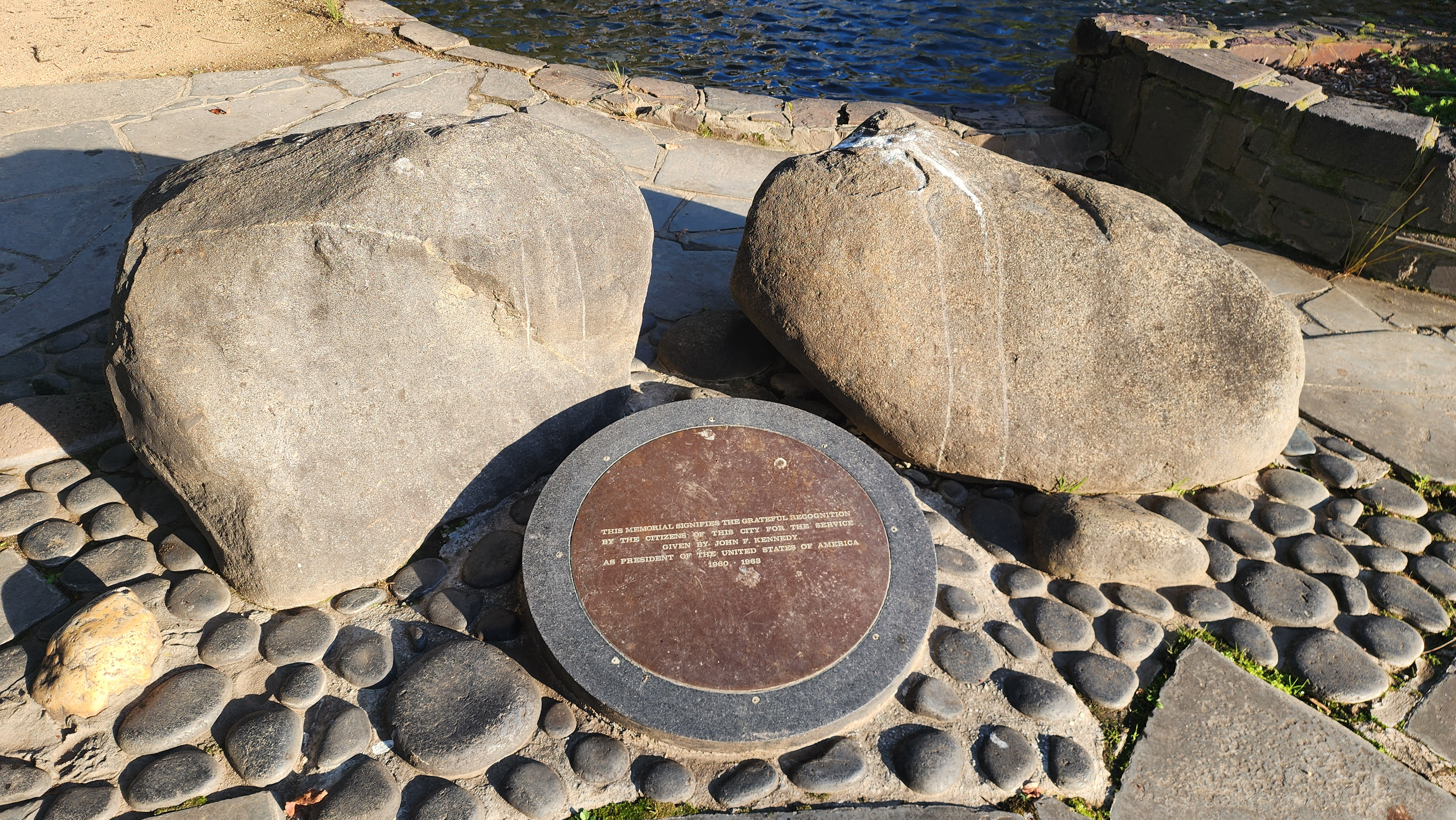
John F. Kennedy memorial plaque

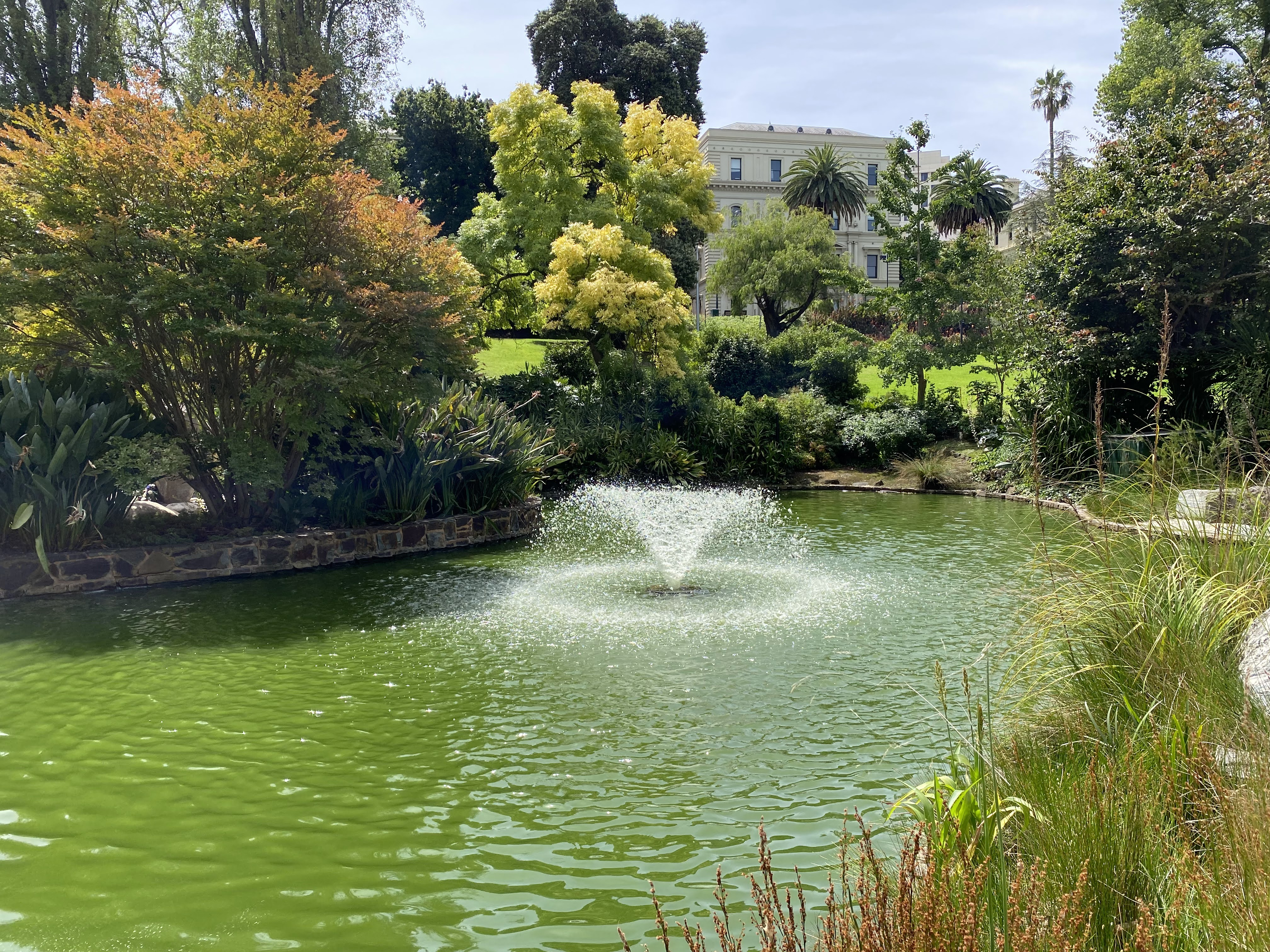
John F. Kennedy Pool

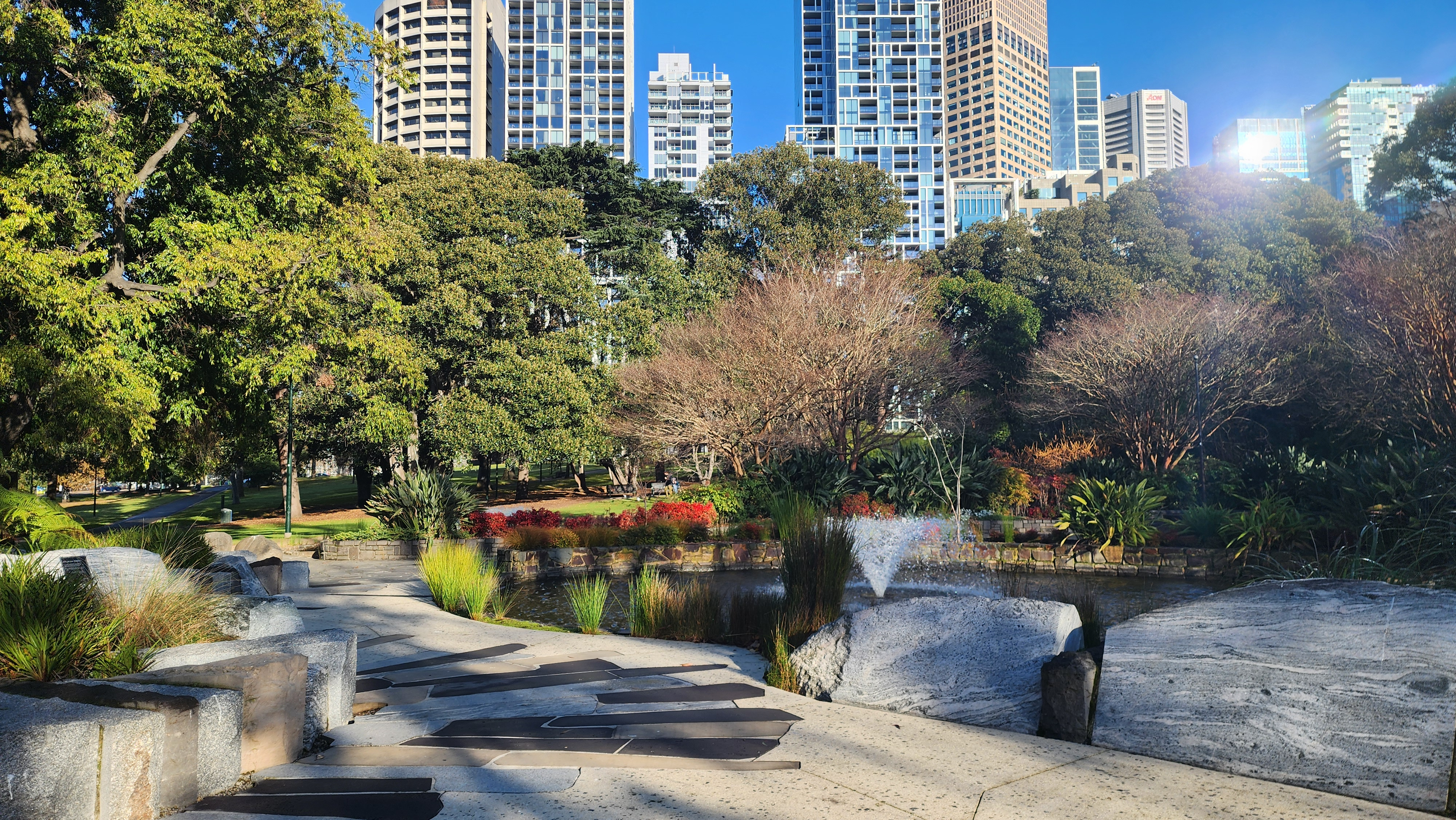
Victorian Emergency Services Memorial and John F. Kennedy Pool

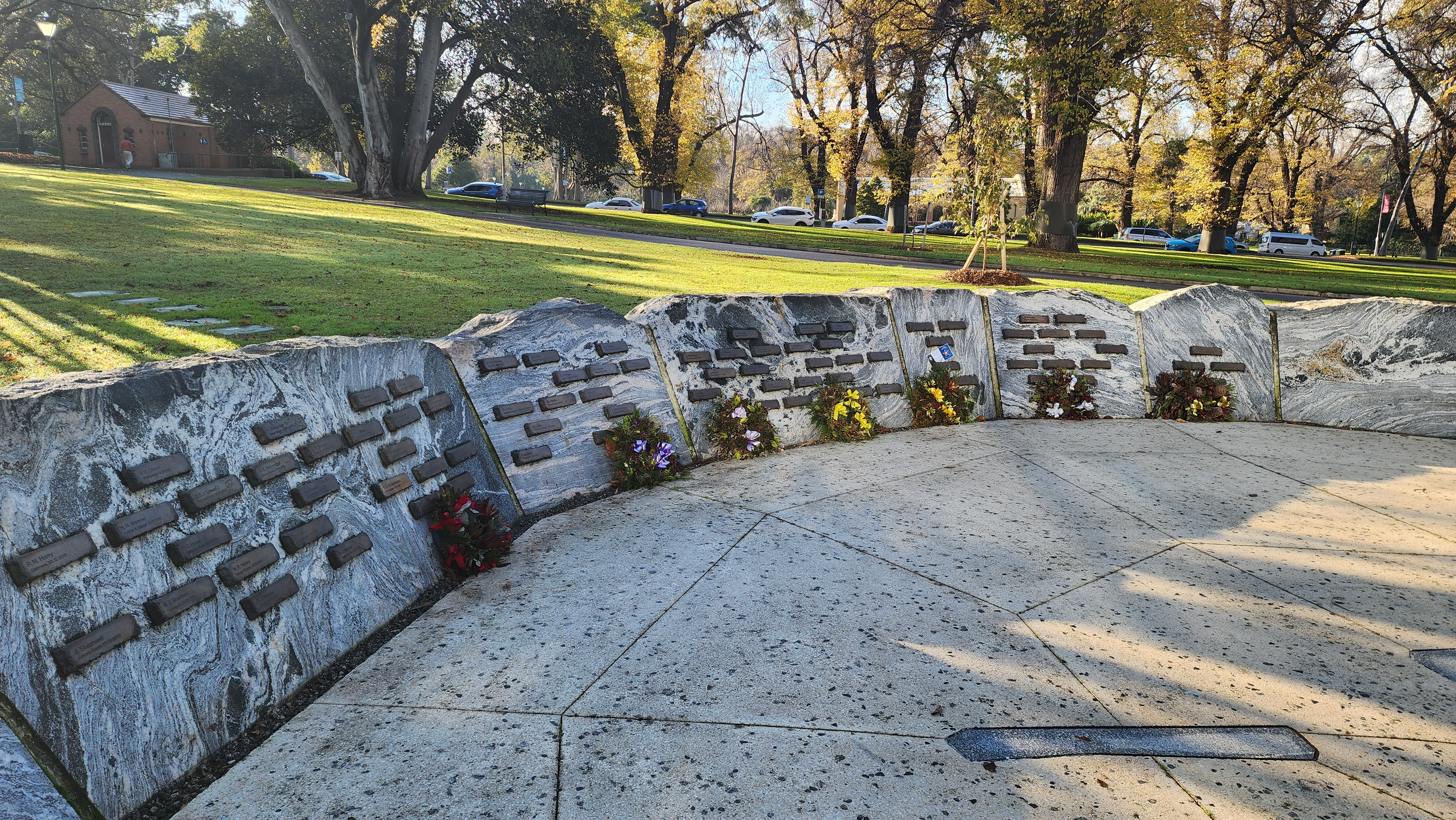
Victorian Emergency Services Memorial

== See also ==
- Parks and gardens of Melbourne
- Heritage gardens in Australia
- List of heritage-listed buildings in Melbourne
