= Premier of Victoria =

Head of government of Victoria

- Victorian coat of arms

- Flag of Victoria

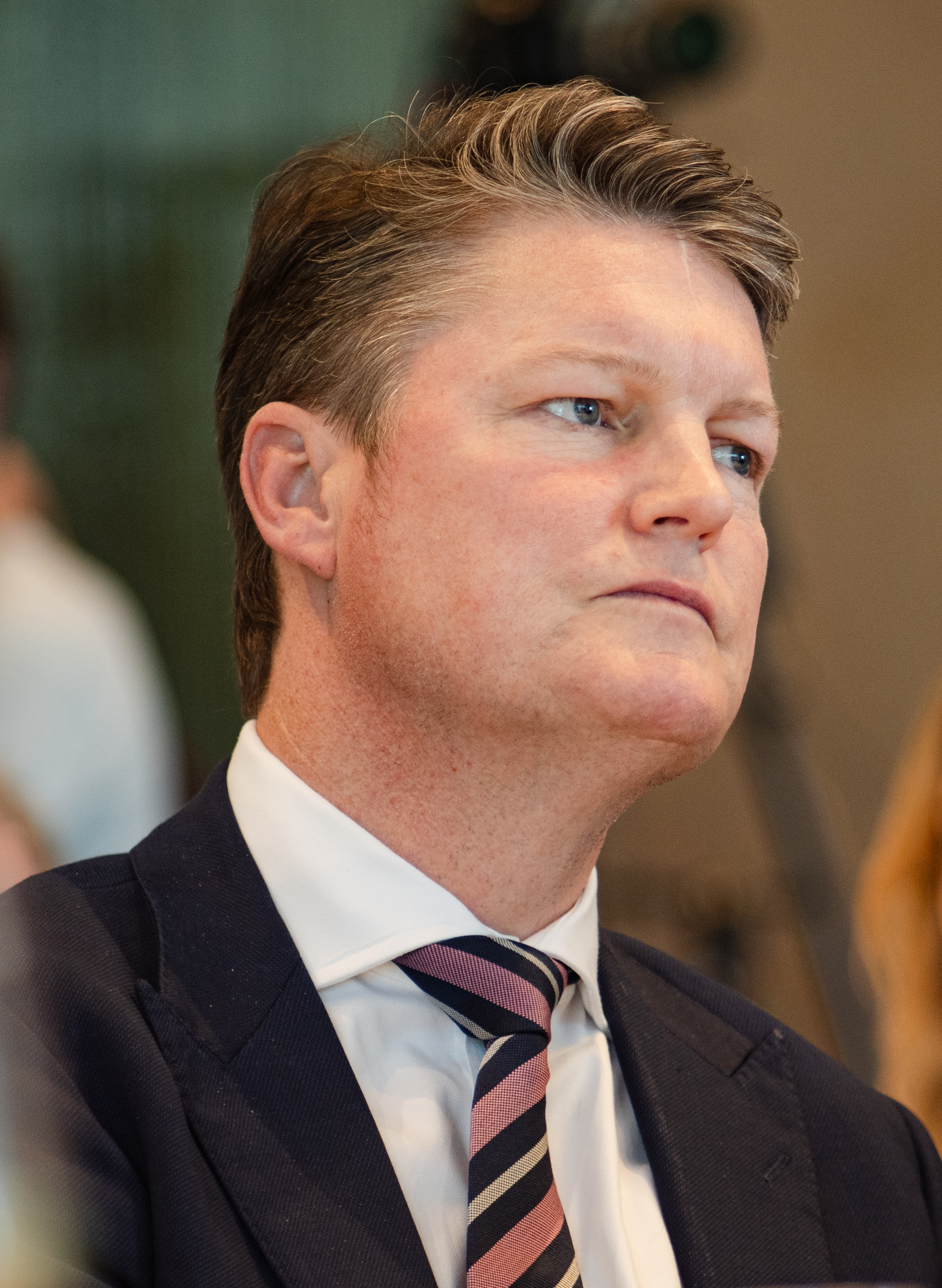
- Incumbent; Ben Carroll since 28 July 2026
- Department of Premier and Cabinet
- Style: The Honourable (formal); Premier (informal)
- Status: Head of government
- Member of: Parliament; National Cabinet; Cabinet; Executive Council
- Reports to: Parliament
- Seat: 1 Treasury Place, Melbourne
- Appointer: Governor of Victoria
- Term length: At the governor's pleasure; by convention, based on appointee's ability to command confidence in the Legislative Assembly
- Constituting instrument: None (constitutional convention)
- Formation: 28 November 1855
- First holder: William Haines
- Deputy: Deputy premier of Victoria
- Salary: A$481,190
- Website: www.premier.vic.gov.au

The premier of Victoria is the head of government of the state of Victoria in Australia. The premier leads the Cabinet of Victoria and selects its ministers. The premier is appointed by the governor of Victoria, must be a member of the Victorian Legislative Assembly, and command confidence in the lower house of the Parliament of Victoria. The premier is usually the leader of the political party that holds a majority of lower house members.

Each premier since 1933, apart from short-serving Premier Ian Macfarlan, has had a portrait commissioned for the Victorian Parliament's portrait collection. The tradition was initiated by Legislative Council President Fred Grimwade. Premiers who have served for over 3,000 days have a statue created in their honor. As of 2024, six premiers have achieved this milestone and four have their statues near the premier's office at 1 Treasury Place.

The longest-serving premier is Henry Bolte of the Liberal Party, who served for over 17 years. The shortest-serving premier is George Elmslie, first premier from the Labor Party, who served for 13 days. The current premier is Ben Carroll of the Labor Party, who assumed the office on 28 July 2026 following the resignation of Jacinta Allan.

== History ==
=== Before federation ===
The first meeting of the Legislative Council was on 11 November 1851, at St Patrick's Hall, Bourke Street West, with its primary focus the drafting of a constitution, for the Parliament of the United Kingdom's approval, to separate the Port Phillip District from New South Wales. Responsible government was established in 1855, when the constitution was passed by the British Parliament and received royal assent. This allowed Victoria to become its own colony, named after the reigning monarch, Queen Victoria. Governor Charles Hotham appointed William Haines to be Victoria's first premier on 28 November 1855, with the first election, provided for by the Electoral Act 1856, organised the following year.

Victoria's first election saw Haines re-appointed as premier, and the election also marked the beginning of Victoria's bicameral system. The first sitting of parliament was on 25 November 1856, taking place in Parliament House, Melbourne.

Initially, formal political parties did not exist. Every member of parliament (MP) was an independent, making it difficult for an MP to command the confidence of the Legislative Assembly. Between 1855 and 1863, there were seven changes of government, and eleven instances where Governor Henry Barkly was unable to find neither an MP who would be willing to serve as premier, nor an MP who could form a ministry.

=== Post federation ===
From Australia's federation in 1901 until the 1950s, Victorian political history was marked by instability, with 24 changes in government during that time. Henry Bolte, then leader of the Liberal Party, won the 1955 election, and went on to serve as premier for 17 years and 83 days becoming the longest serving premier to date. Following Bolte, two more Liberal Party leaders, Rupert Hamer and Lindsay Thompson, would serve as premier, before the Labor Party won government in 1982 with John Cain, whose father had also served as Premier. Cain resigned from the office of premier in 1990 and was succeeded by Joan Kirner, Victoria's first female premier. Between 2014 and 2023, Daniel Andrews served as premier, winning three elections before resigning in favour of Jacinta Allan.

== Appointment and succession ==
A premier must hold a seat in the Legislative Assembly and have the support of a majority of lower house members. This is usually the leader of the political party or coalition with the majority of lower house seats. In the event of a minority government, where the government does not hold a majority of seats, the government is formed by a party and the support of crossbenchers, usually through commitments of confidence and supply to the party they wish to form government.

Following a premier's resignation or an election loss, the governor of Victoria appoints a new premier by swearing them in. If a government loses an election, the existing premier and ministers continue on a caretaker basis by convention until a new government is appointed, ensuring Victoria always has a government. An outgoing premier will typically advise the governor to request they call on the Leader of the Opposition to form a government and to tender their and their ministers' resignation. The governor then accepts the resignations and appoints a new government. When a premier loses an election, the Leader of the Opposition must assure the governor that they have majority support in the Legislative Assembly. The governor then commissions them to form a government, and the new premier and parliamentarians nominated as ministers are then sworn in as Ministers of the Crown. Elections are held every four years, on the last Saturday of November, with the next election set for 28 November 2026. There are no term limits imposed on a premier.

== Powers and role ==
The role of the premier includes leading parliament, serving as the Chief Minister and Chair of Cabinet, choosing ministers and assigning portfolios, handling portfolio responsibilities, and communicating between the Victorian Government, the Governor and Cabinet, other state and territory governments, the Commonwealth Government, and overseas governments.

The premier represents Victoria as a member of the National Cabinet. The National Cabinet was established on 13 March 2020 in response to the COVID-19 pandemic and replaced the Council of Australian Governments of which the premier was a member.

== Amenities of office ==
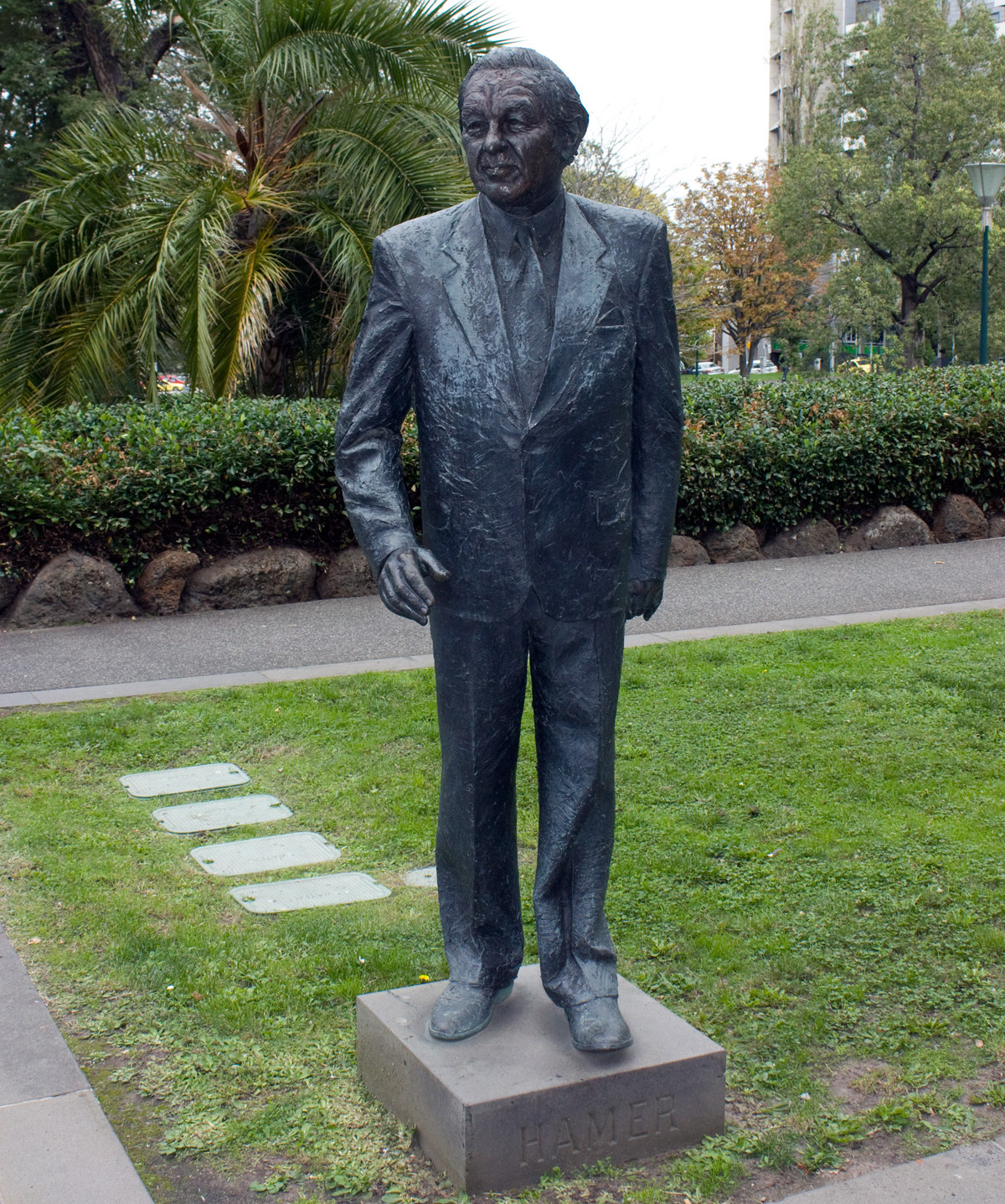
Rupert Hamer's statue at 1 Treasury Place

=== Salary ===
As of 1 July 2023, the premier is paid a total salary of A$481,190. This is made up of the basic salary received by all members of parliament ($198,839), an additional salary for the role of premier ($221,871), and an expense allowance of $60,480. Changes to the premier's salary are determined by the Victorian Independent Remuneration Tribunal.

=== Portrait ===
Each premier since 1933, apart from Ian Macfarlan, who served for only 51 days, has had a portrait commissioned for the Victorian Parliament's portrait collection. The tradition was initiated by Legislative Council President Fred Grimwade. Deceased premiers have their portraits painted from images and living former premiers have their portrait painted in person.

=== Statue ===
Premiers who hold the office for 3,000 days (8 years and 88 days) have a statue made in their likeness as a commemoration of their legacy. Six premiers, Daniel Andrews, Henry Bolte, John Cain Jr, Albert Dunstan, Rupert Hamer, and James McCulloch have done so, but four have had their statues completed. Daniel Andrews' statue is pending completion and James McCulloch, despite serving for over 3,000 days, did not get a statue. Historians Paul Strangio and Brian J. Costar have suggested that this is likely due to McCulloch serving his terms before federation and/or non-consecutively. The statues, sculpted in bronze by Peter Corlett, were installed in September 1999 after premier Jeff Kennett instituted the policy. The statues are located near the premier's office at 1 Treasury Place.

=== Retirement ===
Once retired, former premiers get an office in the Old Treasury Building, Melbourne.

== Lists relating to the premiers of Victoria ==
The longest-serving premier was Henry Bolte, who served from 7 June 1955 to 23 August 1972 for a total of 17 years and 77 days. He was a member of the Liberal Party. The shortest-serving premier was George Elmslie, who served from 9 December 1913 to 22 December 1913, for a total of 13 days in office. He was also the first premier from the Labor Party.

Lists of people who have been premier:

- List of premiers of Victoria
- List of premiers of Victoria by time in office

== See also ==
- Deputy Premier of Victoria
- List of Victorian government agencies

== Sources ==
- Costar, Brian J; Strangio, Paul (2006). The Victorian Premiers, 1856–2006. Federation Press. ISBN 1-86287-601-0. Archived from the original on 9 October 2023.
