= 1 Treasury Place =

Government building in Melbourne, Australia

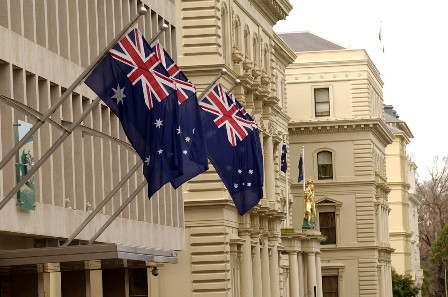

General information
- Status: Completed
- Architectural style: Internationalist style
- Location: 1 Treasury Place; Melbourne, Victoria, Australia
- Coordinates: 37°48′47″S 144°58′30″E

Design and construction
- Architect: Barry Patten

1 Treasury Place (also known as the State Government Office) is a government office complex in Melbourne, Victoria, Australia. The building is the official location of the Office of the Premier of Victoria, currently headed by Ben Carroll, and other integral government departments. The complex was constructed in the mid-1960s and comprises five levels of office accommodation. The building was designed by architect Barry Patten of Yuncken Freeman Architects Pty Ltd. according to the internationalist style of architecture.

The building is home to the Victorian Government Department of Premier and Cabinet (DPC) and Department of Treasury and Finance (DTF). The building is also home to the office of the Secretary of DTF (currently Camille Kingston), the office of the Premier of Victoria (currently Ben Carroll), and the office of the Treasurer of Victoria (currently Colin Brooks).

== History ==
Prior to the planning and construction of 1 Treasury Place, the undeveloped landscape was a large paddock with a caretaker as its sole resident. The land was selected to be used as a site for an architectural competition to design a series of government owned and operated buildings which resides within the Treasury .

The Treasury Precinct holds significant historic value as for the past 150 years it has resided at the centre of the Victorian government administration in Melbourne. The government's position in the precinct was established before the separation of government departments and included buildings such as the Government Printer's Office, Old and New Treasury Building and Department of Agriculture Building. These buildings along with the buildings built in the 1960s under Yuncken Freeman Architects Pty. Ltd. portray the work that the government has done over the past 150 years while operating in the Precinct. Commonly known as the State public offices 1 Treasury Place is one of several buildings in the urban surroundings that was influenced by the internationalist style of architecture. A number of these buildings were designed by Barry Patten and other architects from Yucken Freeman architects. During the time 1 Treasury Place was under construction two other structures were also undergoing work on the same site. Using the same facade as 1 Treasury Place these additional buildings were also designed by Yuncken Freeman Architects in response to the architectural competition. One building located directly behind the old treasury building was designed to accommodate the premier and other ministers. The other structure which was built to the East of 1 Treasury Place was to house the State Chemical Laboratories. All 3 government buildings were designed by Yuncken Freeman Architects Pty. Ltd. as a response to the brief that outlined the competition.

== Description ==
The state government offices are strictly modernist buildings that express "soaring wonderment" as per the guidelines of the competition that was held in 1962. The form of the building (1 treasury place) is rectangular and horizontal with a centralised square tower in the centre surrounded by void space consisting of walkways leading to the tower from the outer shell of the building. Its use of off grey precast concrete walls results in the facade of the building being expressed as a repeating grid made from the tall sections of precast panels and the chamfered rectangular window cutouts that complete the grid pattern. The grid like formation of the windows are in close relation to that of the window formation of the old treasury building. The whole building appears to be elevated off the ground and is supported by a row of repeating square concrete columns on the ground floor. A much taller rectilinear building of the same aesthetic is joined onto this building via a walkway. The overall ensemble of structures taking on the form of a monument.

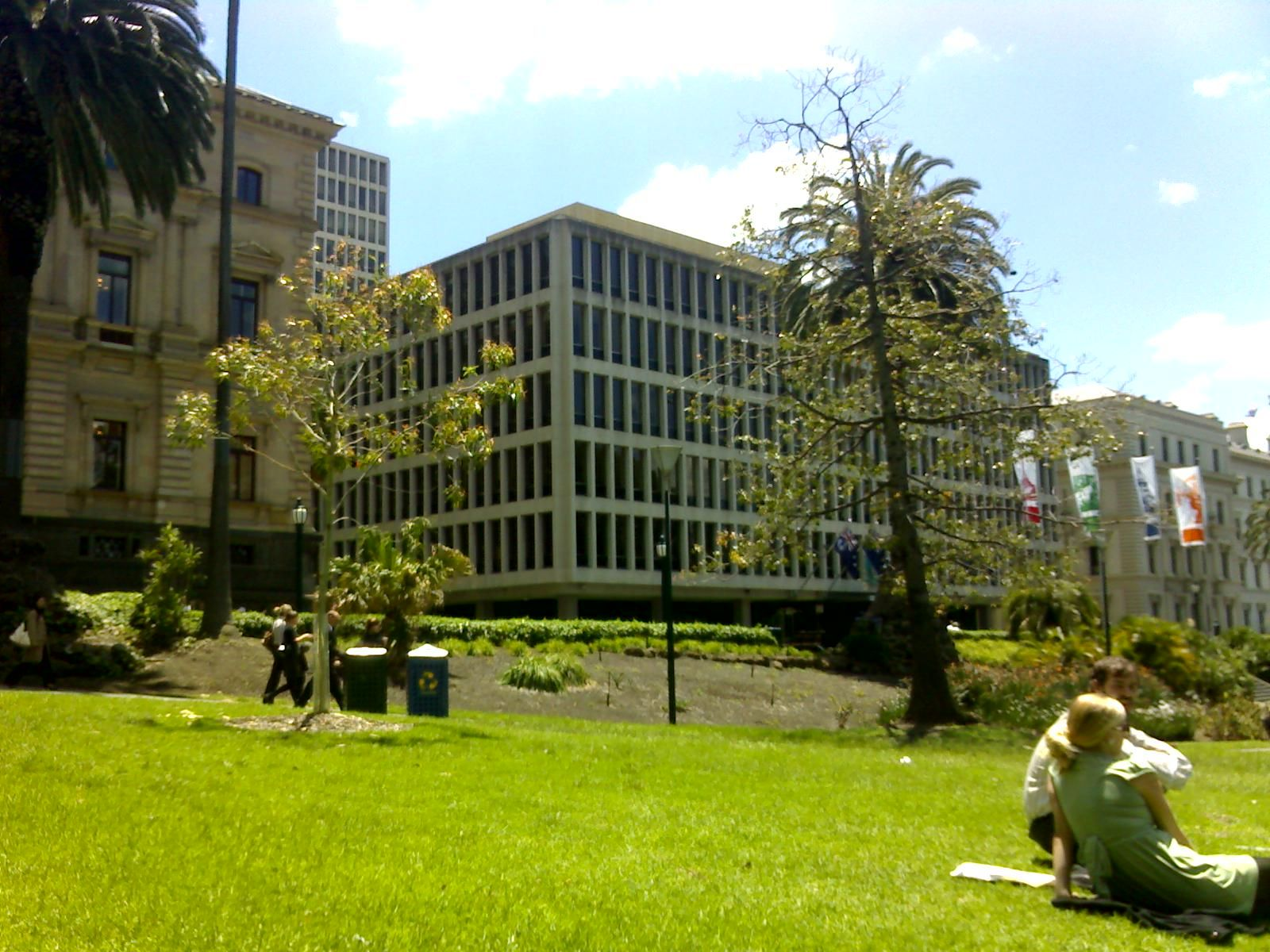
1 Treasury Place

== Key influences and design approach ==
In 1962 the government conducted an architectural competition amongst twelve competing firms to design and submit plans for the existing site. One of the requirements for a successful entry was to showcase one or more buildings with an aesthetic quality described as "soaring wonderment". Ultimately the winning proposal was submitted by Barry Patten of Yuncken Freeman Architects; it differed from the majority of other proposals offered, in that it rejected a tower-like construction in order to minimise impact of views from the top of Collins Street, and would include two infill buildings of similar scale to the Old Treasury Building and 2 Treasury Place, with the taller building to face Macarthur Street.

Originally known as the State Public Offices, this building, along with the two others, is architecturally important as it represents a unique modernist 'urban ensemble'. This is an austere ensemble of high modernist concrete buildings which emphasise their grid structure. They are co-ordinated in a pleasing arrangement of contrasting scales and levels, softened by a treed walkway. Despite their severity, they relate well to the formal classicism of the adjoining 19th-century building. Their rigid, contemporary and austere design was intended to contrast with the surrounding buildings in the treasury precinct. The building's exterior, constructed primarily of masonry, with small classically proportioned window openings as well as the location of the tower to one side (1 Macarthur Street) of Old Treasury Building was an unusually sensitive response to the urban context. These buildings are important for their innovative use of pre-cast panelling incorporated as load bearing elements. The key influence for these 3 buildings was the urban context in which they were constructed, as well as somewhat continuing the design approach of the existing buildings in its area, all of which follow the same design principals and architecture. A key element in their design was the functions of what the buildings still perform today, the buildings currently house the Department of Premier and Cabinet, the Department of Treasury and Finance as well as ministerial officer of the Premier, Deputy Premier and Treasurer.

== Awards ==
In 1970, 1 Treasury Place was 'Building of the Year', awarded by the Royal Australian Institute of Architects, and Yuncken Freeman Architects was one of the most highly regarded firms of their time.
