= Victoria State Government =

Executive government of the state of Victoria, Australia

- State government
- Logo used since 2015

Overview
- Established: 1 July 1851; 175 years ago as a responsible colonial government; 1 January 1901; 125 years ago as an Australian state
- State: Victoria
- Country: Australia
- Leader: Premier of Victoria (Ben Carroll)
- Appointed by: Governor of Victoria (Margaret Gardner) on the advice of the premier
- Main organ: Executive Council of Victoria (de jure); Cabinet of Victoria (de facto)
- Ministries: 10 government departments
- Responsible to: Parliament of Victoria
- Annual budget: $111.7 billion (2023–2024)
- Headquarters: 1 Treasury Place
- Website: vic.gov.au

The Victoria State Government, also referred to as the Victorian Government, is the executive government of the Australian state of Victoria.

== History ==
The first government of Victoria was formed on 1 July 1851 when the Port Phillip District separated from the colony of New South Wales, becoming a separate colony, the colony of Victoria. The first Legislative Council of the new government met on 11 November 1851, and proceeded to draft a Constitution of Victoria, approve the world's first secret ballot for elections, and build Parliament House in Melbourne. After the Constitution was approved by Queen Victoria, responsible self-government in Victoria began on 23 November 1855. On 1 January 1901 Victoria became a state in the newly formed Commonwealth of Australia, and responsibilities were divided between the Commonwealth (federal) government and the state government. National services such as defence, telephone, and postal services came under the federal government, while the Victorian Parliament remained responsible for police and education.

== Structure and functions ==
The Constitution of Australia regulates the relationship between the Victorian Government and the Commonwealth level of government, and cedes legislative and judicial supremacy to the federal government on conflicting matters.

The Victoria State Government enforces acts passed by the parliament through government departments, statutory authorities, and other public agencies. Legislation is introduced, debated, an passed or amended in the democratically-elected Parliament of Victoria, which comprises the Victorian Legislative Council (upper house) and Victorian Legislative Assembly (lower house).

The government is formally presided over by the Governor of Victoria, who exercises executive authority granted by the state's constitution through the Executive Council, a body consisting of senior cabinet ministers. In reality, both the governor and the Executive Council are largely ceremonial, with the premier and ministers having control over policy, appointments, and other executive orders made by the governor.

The Government of Victoria operates under the principles of the Westminster system as adapted in the Australian Constitution and of responsible government. Both systems and principles of governance have developed out of the United Kingdom, to which Victoria was previously a colony.

== See also ==
- Carroll ministry, the current Cabinet formation
- List of premiers of Victoria
- First Peoples' Assembly of Victoria, an independent elected body for negotiating treaties between the State and First Nations of Victoria
- List of Victorian government agencies
- Local government areas of Victoria
- Victorian Charter of Human Rights and Responsibilities (2006)
