= Hitching post =

A hitching post is a post to which a horse (or other animal) may be tethered to prevent it from straying. The term can also refer to:

- The "hitching post", a contentious punishment in the case of Hope v. Pelzer
- The Hitching Post, a steakhouse restaurant
- The Hitching Post, a pub in Ballycogley
- The Hitching Post, a student publication of Wilson High School (Los Angeles, California)
- The Hitching Post, a student publication of Marlboro High School
- Hitching Post Plaza in Perinton, New York
- Hitching Post Hill (Hyattsville, Maryland), a historic building in Hyattsville, Prince George's County, Maryland
- Hitchin' Posts, a lost 1920 drama film directed by John Ford

== See also ==
- Hitchin
