= Old Treasury Building, Melbourne =

Public building and museum in Melbourne, Australia

Old Treasury Building
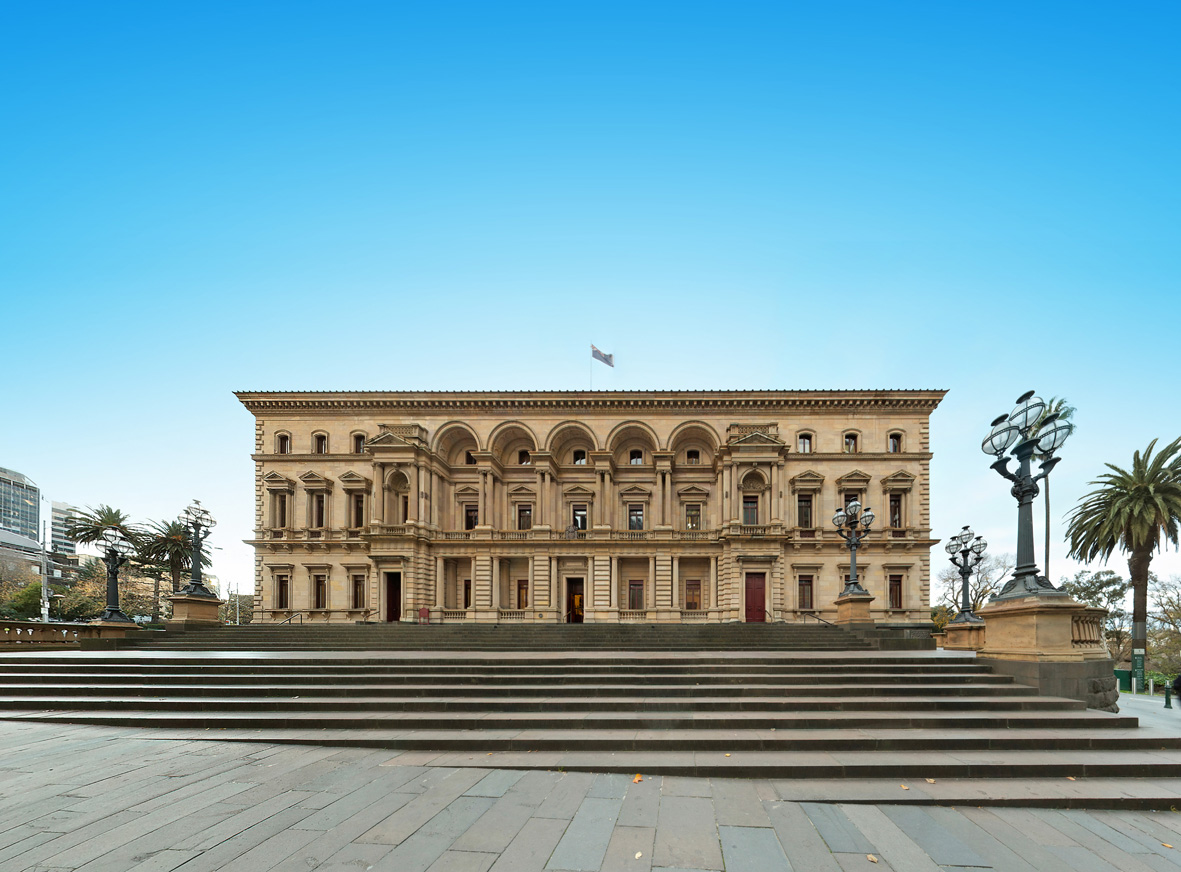
- Old Treasury Building

- Location within Melbourne

General information
- Status: Completed
- Type: Government building
- Architectural style: Renaissance Revival
- Location: East Melbourne, Victoria, Australia, 20 Spring Street
- Coordinates: 37°48′47″S 144°58′27″E
- Construction started: 1858
- Completed: 1862; 164 years ago
- Owner: Government of Victoria

Design and construction
- Architect: John James Clark

Other information
- Public transit: – Parliament; –; –

Website
- oldtreasurybuilding.org.au

Victorian Heritage Register
- Official name: Treasury Reserve Precinct
- Type: State Registered Place
- Designated: 20 August 1982
- Reference no.: H1526
- Heritage Overlay no.: HO174

Register of the National Estate
- Official name: Old Treasury Building
- Type: Historic
- Designated: 21 March 1978
- Reference no.: 5210

The Old Treasury Building is a former government building, now history museum, located on Spring Street in the city centre of Melbourne, in Victoria, Australia. Built between 1858 and 1862 in the grand Renaissance Revival style, the building was designed to accommodate the Treasury Department, various government officials' offices including the Governor In Council, and basement vaults intended to house gold from the Victorian gold rush. It now houses a range of functions, including a museum of Melbourne's history, known as the Old Treasury Building Museum.

The building was added to the Victorian Heritage Register on 20 August 1982; and to the now defunct Register of the National Estate on 21 March 1978.

== History ==
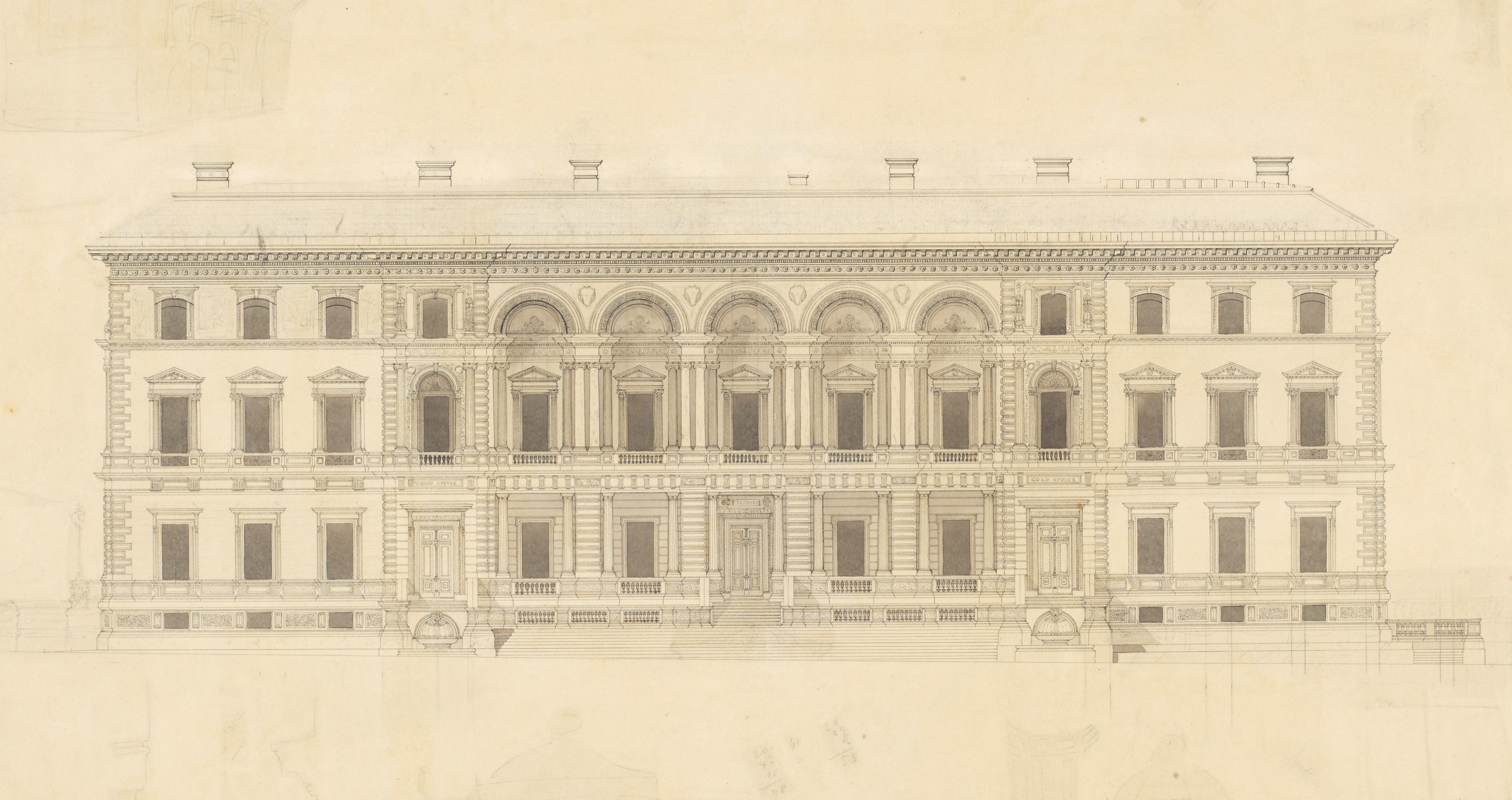
Main facade of the Old Treasury Building, original drawing by JJ Clark

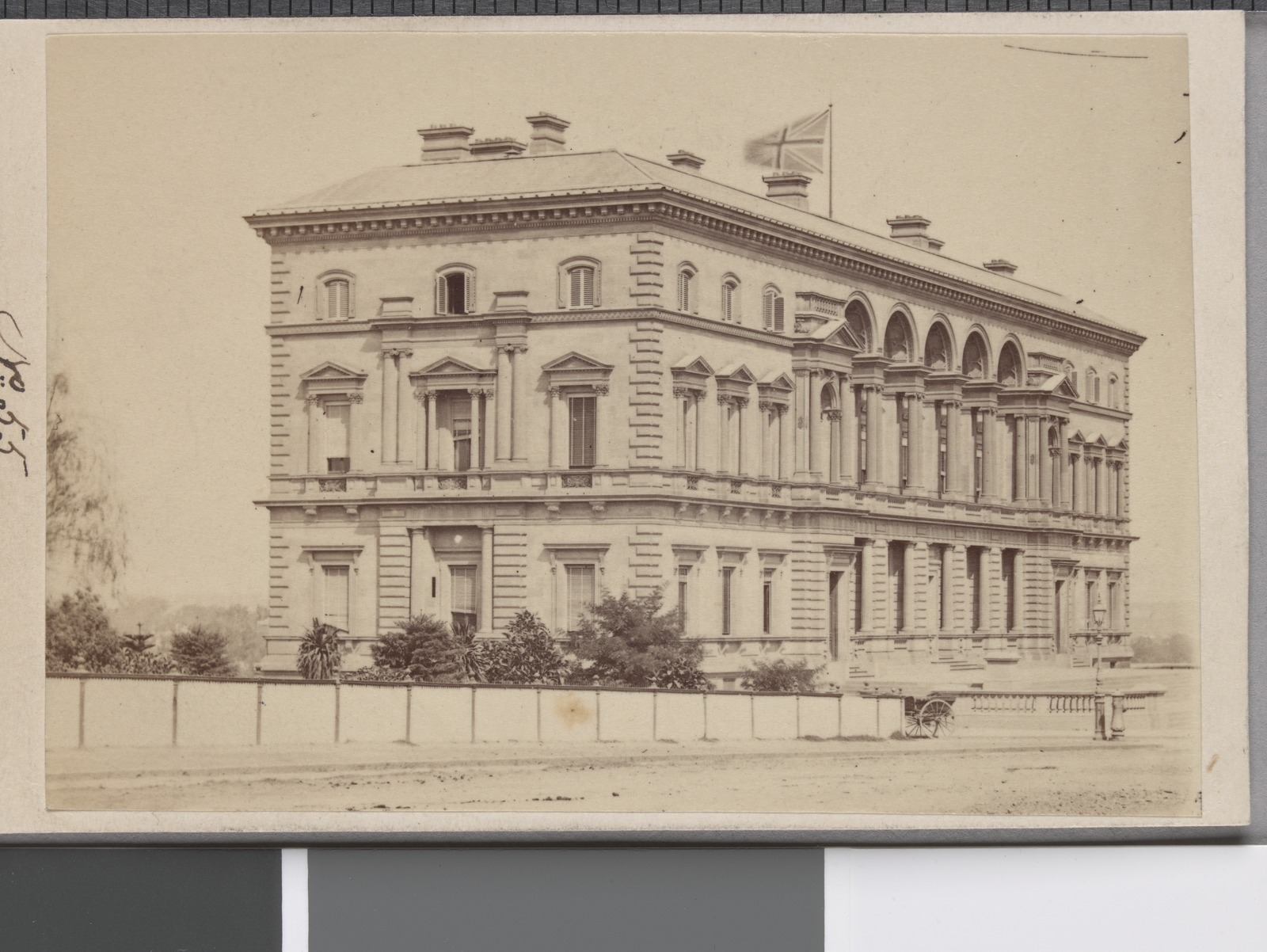
Treasury Building 1870. Photo by Charles Nettleton

The Treasury Building was constructed between 1858–62, and is considered one of Australia's finest Renaissance Revival buildings. One original purpose was to house some of the bullion from the gold rush in the 'gold vaults' in the basement, but by the time it was finished the rush was over, and they were used to store government documents instead. The main purpose was to house offices for the Treasury Department, along with rooms for the Chief Secretary, the Treasurer, the Registrar-General, the Registrar of the Supreme Court, and the Auditor General, as well as one for the Governor of Victoria when he was on government business.

The building was designed by young architect J. J. Clark who was aged 19 years in 1857. Construction of the basement and ground floor began in 1858, when he took seven months leave to tour Europe and the United Kingdom. On his return he completed the design, possibly changing that of the second floor, and removing the fourth level attic of the central section in favour of a continuous eave. Many of J J Clark's drawings are currently on display throughout the building. Architectural historian Miles Lewis once described The Old Treasury as the "finest public building exterior in Australia". Clark had already designed a few government buildings, including the Printing Office located behind the Treasury building, and later went on to design many government buildings both in Victoria and elsewhere, notably the Old Mint in Melbourne, considered to be another fine example in a classical style, and the grand Brisbane Treasury in Queensland.

While the building itself was finally completed in 1862, there was long delay in completing the forecourt, with individual timber staircases leading to the three main front doors for some time. In 1868 these were replaced with the grand forecourt and cast iron lamps still standing today, also designed by Clark.

It is the cornerstone of the Treasury Reserve government precinct adjacent to the Treasury Gardens and creates an important vista terminating Collins Street, the financial spine of the city.

When the official treasury offices were moved next door to 2 Treasury Place in 1877-78, the building was nicknamed the 'Old Treasury'.

As a leading public building in Melbourne, located in a prominent position with open space around it, the Old Treasury has been the focus for many celebrations and major public events. The arrivals and departures of the Governors of Victoria were occasions for expressions of loyalty to the Crown and sometimes for political statements. In recent years it has been the destination for the Grand Final parade of AFL footballers.

The building is also notable for its role when Melbourne was the temporary capital city of Australia after Federation, with the National Executive Council meeting there. In February 1899, a "secret" Premiers' conference was convened, when it was decided Melbourne's Parliament House would be the temporary capital until the location of the Australian National Capital was officially decided.

== Establishment of a museum ==
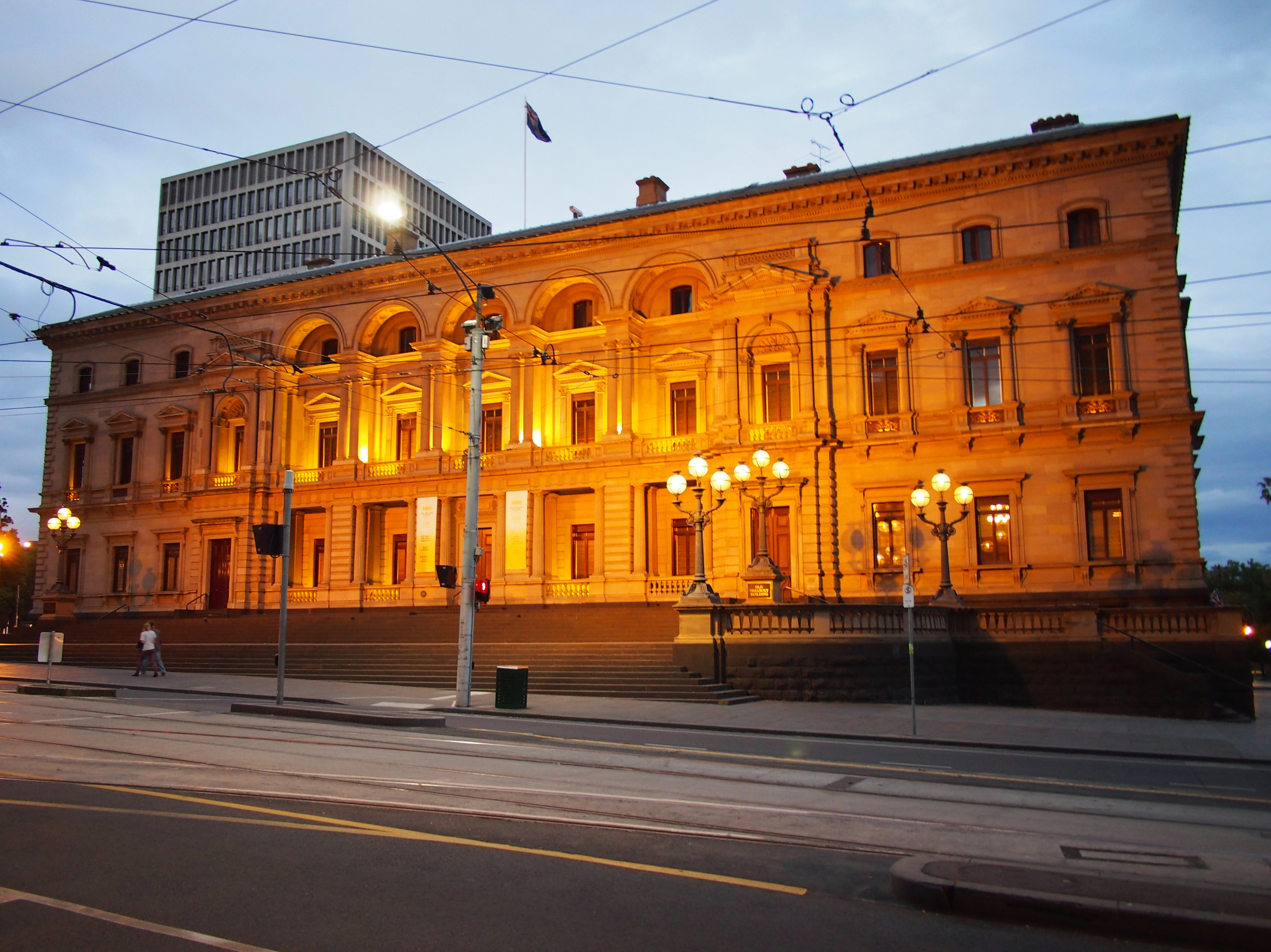
The Old Treasury Building at dusk in 2012

During the 1970s, the Hamer Government was developing policy for museums in Victoria. In 1981, Norman Lacy, as Minister for the Arts, established a Museums Development Committee to develop a comprehensive museums policy for Victoria. Lacy also proposed to the Executive Committee of Victoria's 150th Anniversary Celebrations in 1984 that a new Museum of Social and Political History be established at the Old Treasury Building.

Finally in 1994 after restoration of the building, the Old Treasury Building Museum was opened with exhibitions detailing the history of Melbourne, the Victorian gold rush, and the history of the building. Operations of the buildings and the museum are vested in an Old Treasury Building Reserve Committee of Management, and is a registered charity. The Museum has changed name a number of times, becoming the Gold Treasury Museum, the City Museum at Old Treasury and then the Old Treasury Building Museum again. Since 2011 it has presented programs in partnership with Public Record Office Victoria.

== In the media ==
The Old Treasury Building has been used as a filming location. It features in the climactic sequence of the film Knowing (2009), a film set in Boston, Massachusetts. Melbourne and Boston are officially recognised as being sister cities.

== Occupants ==
The Old Treasury was built to house the Treasury Department and store gold, but also provided offices for the leaders of the young colony, including the Governor, the Premier (at the time called Chief Secretary), the Treasurer, the Registrar-General, the Registrar of the Supreme Court and the Auditor General. Since its construction in 1862, it has also held the office of the Governor of Victoria, who still holds weekly meetings of the Executive Council, consisting of the Governor and at least two Ministers of the Crown, that is, the leaders of the governing party. The Governor in Council as this meeting is called, is the formal enacting of legislation when the Governor's signature and the Great Seal of Victoria is put in place on the bill. Various other appointments and other regulations are also formally made at this weekly meeting, upon the advice of the Premier and Parliament of Victoria.

In addition to the museum, the Old Treasury Building is now home to the Office of the Victorian Government Architect, the Victorian Marriage Registry, and offices for most living former Premiers of Victoria.

== See also ==
- Architecture of Melbourne
- List of heritage-listed buildings in Melbourne
- Victorian architecture
