= Second Andrews ministry =

70th ministry of Victoria, Australia

- 70th ministry of Victoria, Australia
- Date formed: 29 November 2018
- Date dissolved: 5 December 2022

People and organisations
- Monarch: Elizabeth II (until 8 September 2022); Charles III (since 8 September 2022)
- Governor: Linda Dessau
- Premier: Daniel Andrews
- Deputy premier: James Merlino (until 27 June 2022); Jacinta Allan (since 27 June 2022)
- No. of ministers: 22
- Member party: Labor
- Status in legislature: Majority government
- Opposition cabinet: O'Brien Shadow Cabinet (until 7 September 2021); Second Guy Shadow Cabinet (since 7 September 2021)
- Opposition party: Liberal–National Coalition
- Opposition leader: Michael O'Brien (Liberal) (until 7 September 2021); Matthew Guy (Liberal) (since 7 September 2021)

History
- Election: 2018 state election
- Predecessor: First Andrews ministry
- Successor: Third Andrews ministry

The Second Andrews ministry was the 70th ministry of the Government of Victoria. The Labor government, led by Premier Daniel Andrews and Deputy Premier James Merlino, was officially sworn in on 29 November 2018, following the party's second consecutive victory at the 2018 state election, which was held on 24 November 2018.

At the time of its formation, the ministry consisted of 22 ministers, eleven of whom were women, making it the first cabinet in Victoria's history to reach gender parity. To accommodate this change Philip Dalidakis was removed from his cabinet position. However, his work as a minister was praised by Andrews. Following the resignation of Gavin Jennings and the appointment of Ros Spence on 23 March 2020, the Cabinet became majority female.

The Second Andrews ministry succeeded the First Andrews ministry, and was succeeded by the Third Andrews ministry.

== Second Andrews ministry, 2018–2022 ==
=== June 2022–October 2022 ===
A cabinet reshuffle was undertaken in June 2022 after five cabinet ministers had announced their upcoming retirement at the November state election: James Merlino, Martin Foley, Lisa Neville, Martin Pakula and Richard Wynne.

Lizzie Blandthorn, Colin Brooks, Steve Dimopoulos, Sonya Kilkenny and Harriet Shing were appointed to the ministry to replace the retiring ministers. The rearranged ministry was sworn in on 27 June. Kilkenny was sworn in a week later on 4 July as she had contracted COVID-19 and had to isolate prior to the original swearing-in ceremony.

Two new ministerial roles were also created to oversee the 2026 Commonwealth Games to be held in the state.

Minister	Portfolio
Daniel Andrews, MP	Premier
Jacinta Allan, MP	Deputy Premier; Minister for Transport Infrastructure; Minister for the Suburban Rail Loop; Minister for Commonwealth Games Delivery
Jaclyn Symes, MLC	Leader of the Government in the Legislative Council; Attorney-General; Minister for Emergency Services
Gayle Tierney, MLC	Deputy Leader of the Government in the Legislative Council; Minister for Training and Skills; Minister for Higher Education; Minister for Agriculture
Tim Pallas, MP	Treasurer; Minister for Industrial Relations; Minister for Economic Development; Minister for Trade
Lizzie Blandthorn, MP	Leader of the House; Minister for Planning
Colin Brooks, MP	Minister for Child Protection and Family Services; Minister for Disability, Ageing and Carers
Anthony Carbines, MP	Minister for Police; Minister for Crime Prevention; Minister for Racing
Ben Carroll, MP	Minister for Industry Support and Recovery; Minister for Business Precincts; Minister for Public Transport; Minister for Roads and Road Safety
Lily D'Ambrosio, MP	Minister for Energy; Minister for Environment and Climate Action; Minister for Solar Homes
Steve Dimopoulos, MP	Minister For Tourism, Sport And Major Events; Minister For Creative Industries
Melissa Horne, MP	Minister for Consumer Affairs, Gaming and Liquor Regulation; Minister for Ports and Freight; Minister for Local Government; Minister for Suburban Development
Natalie Hutchins, MP	Minister for Education; Minister for Women
Sonya Kilkenny, MP	Minister for Corrections (from 4 July 2022); Minister for Youth Justice (Victoria) (from 4 July 2022); Minister for Victim Support (from 4 July 2022); Minister for Fishing and Boating (from 4 July 2022)
Shaun Leane, MLC	Minister for Commonwealth Games Legacy; Minister for Veterans
Danny Pearson, MP	Minister for Housing; Assistant Treasurer; Minister for Government Services; Minister for Regulatory Reform
Jaala Pulford, MLC	Minister for Employment; Minister for Innovation, Medical Research and the Digital Economy; Minister for Resources; Minister for Small Business
Harriet Shing, MLC	Minister for Water; Minister for Regional Development; Minister for Equality
Ros Spence, MP	Minister for Prevention of Family Violence; Minister for Multicultural Affairs; Minister for Community Sport; Minister for Youth
Ingrid Stitt, MLC	Minister for Early Childhood and Pre-Prep; Minister for Workplace Safety
Mary-Anne Thomas, MP	Minister for Health; Minister for Ambulance Services
Gabrielle Williams, MP	Minister for Mental Health; Minister for Treaty And First Peoples

=== June 2020–June 2022 ===
On 15 June 2020, Adem Somyurek was dismissed from the ministry due to alleged misconduct, with Robin Scott and Marlene Kairouz also resigning the next day. A reshuffle took place on 22 June 2020, bringing Shaun Leane, Danny Pearson and Natalie Hutchins into cabinet and reassigning several portfolios. Hutchins was previously a minister in the First Andrews Ministry.

On 26 September 2020, health minister Jenny Mikakos resigned as minister, following Premier Daniel Andrews stating in the board of inquiry into the hotel quarantine program that he regarded Mikakos "accountable" for the program. Minister for Mental Health Martin Foley was sworn in as the new health and ambulance services minister later that day. A further reshuffle three days later on 29 September 2020 added Ingrid Stitt into the cabinet and the reassignment of some portfolios.

On 16 December 2020, Jill Hennessy announced she would step down from the role of Attorney-General effective immediately to spend more time with her family but would stay in Parliament and recontest her seat at the 2022 election. She was replaced as Attorney-General by Jaclyn Symes. Mary-Anne Thomas was added to the cabinet and was appointed Minister for Regional Development and Minister for Agriculture.

In February 2021, Lisa Neville was admitted to hospital and was forced to take leave due to Crohn's disease. She returned to work in August 2021. The nature of her emergency services portfolio required regular travel to remote parts of the state at short notice, which was unsuitable for her medical condition. Therefore, Neville relinquished the portfolio to Attorney-General Jaclyn Symes. Symes relinquished her resources portfolio to Jaala Pulford.

On 11 October 2021, Luke Donnellan resigned as minister, following the first day of the IBAC investigation Operation Watts. Donnellan claims he never misused public funds but had previously breached party rules as Minister. He was replaced by Anthony Carbines on 6 December 2021.

Minister	Portfolio
Daniel Andrews, MP	Premier
James Merlino, MP	Deputy Premier; Minister for Education; Minister for Mental Health (from 29 September 2020); Minister for Disability, Ageing and Carers (acting, from 11 October 2021 until 6 December 2021)
Tim Pallas, MP	Treasurer; Minister for Economic Development; Minister for Industrial Relations
Jacinta Allan, MP	Minister for Transport Infrastructure; Minister for the Suburban Rail Loop
Martin Foley, MP	Minister for Health (from 26 September 2020); Minister for Ambulance Services (from 26 September 2020); Minister for Equality; Minister for Mental Health (until 29 September 2020); Minister for Creative Industries (until 29 September 2020)
Richard Wynne, MP	Minister for Planning; Minister for Housing; Minister for Child Protection (acting, from 11 October 2021 until 6 December 2021)
Jaclyn Symes, MLC	Leader of the Government in the Legislative Council; Attorney-General (from 22 December 2020); Minister for Emergency Services (from 23 August 2021); Minister for Resources (until 23 August 2021); Minister for Regional Development (until 22 December 2020); Minister for Agriculture (until 22 December 2020)
Martin Pakula, MP	Minister for Industry Support and Recovery; Minister for Trade; Minister for Business Precincts; Minister for Tourism, Sport and Major Events; Minister for Racing
Lisa Neville, MP	Minister for Police (from 23 August 2021); Minister for Water; Minister for Police and Emergency Services (until 23 August 2021)
Gabrielle Williams, MP	Minister for Women; Minister for Prevention of Family Violence; Minister for Aboriginal Affairs
Lily D'Ambrosio, MP	Minister for Energy, Environment and Climate Change; Minister for Solar Homes
Jaala Pulford, MLC	Minister for Employment; Minister for Innovation, Medical Research and the Digital Economy; Minister for Small Business; Minister for Resources (since 23 August 2021)
Mary-Anne Thomas, MP	Minister for Regional Development (from 22 December 2020); Minister for Agriculture (from 22 December 2020)
Ben Carroll, MP	Minister for Public Transport; Minister for Roads and Road Safety
Gayle Tierney, MLC	Deputy Leader of the Government in the Legislative Council (from 29 September 2020); Minister for Training and Skills; Minister for Higher Education
Melissa Horne, MP	Minister for Ports and Freight; Minister for Consumer Affairs, Gaming and Liquor Regulation; Minister for Fishing and Boating
Ros Spence, MP	Minister for Multicultural Affairs; Minister for Community Sport; Minister for Youth
Shaun Leane, MLC	Minister for Suburban Development; Minister for Local Government; Minister for Veterans
Natalie Hutchins, MP	Minister for Crime Prevention; Minister for Corrections; Minister for Youth Justice (Victoria); Minister for Victim Support
Danny Pearson, MP	Assistant Treasurer; Minister for Regulatory Reform; Minister for Government Services; Minister for Creative Industries (from 29 September 2020)
Ingrid Stitt, MLC	Minister for Workplace Safety (from 29 September 2020); Minister for Early Childhood (from 29 September 2020)
Anthony Carbines, MP	Minister for Child Protection and Family Services (from 6 December 2021); Minister for Disability, Ageing and Carers (from 6 December 2021)
Former Ministers
Luke Donnellan, MP	Minister for Child Protection (until 11 October 2021); Minister for Disability, Ageing and Carers (until 11 October 2021)
Jill Hennessy, MP	Attorney-General (until 16 December 2020); Minister for Workplace Safety (until 29 September 2020)
Jenny Mikakos, MLC	Deputy Leader of the Government in the Legislative Council (23 March to 26 September 2020); Minister for Health (until 26 September 2020); Minister for Ambulance Services (until 26 September 2020)

=== November 2018–June 2020 ===
The first arrangement of the Second Andrews ministry was sworn in on 29 November 2018.

Gavin Jennings resigned from Parliament and the ministry on 23 March 2020. He was replaced in cabinet by Ros Spence.

Minister	Portfolio
Daniel Andrews, MP	Premier
James Merlino, MP	Deputy Premier; Minister for Education
Tim Pallas, MP	Treasurer; Minister for Economic Development; Minister for Industrial Relations
Jill Hennessy, MP	Attorney-General; Minister for Workplace Safety
Jacinta Allan, MP	Minister for Transport Infrastructure; Minister for Priority Precincts (from 23 March 2020)
Jenny Mikakos, MLC	Deputy Leader of the Government in the Legislative Council (from 23 March 2020); Minister for Health; Minister for Ambulance Services
Martin Foley, MP	Minister for Mental Health; Minister for Equality; Minister for Creative Industries
Richard Wynne, MP	Minister for Planning; Minister for Housing; Minister for Multicultural Affairs (until 23 March 2020)
Jaclyn Symes, MLC	Leader of the Government in the Legislative Council (from 23 March 2020); Minister for Regional Development; Minister for Agriculture; Minister for Resources; Deputy Leader of the Government in the Legislative Council (until 23 March 2020)
Martin Pakula, MP	Minister for Jobs, Innovation and Trade; Minister for Tourism, Sport and Major Events; Minister for Racing
Lisa Neville, MP	Minister for Police and Emergency Services; Minister for Water
Robin Scott, MP	Assistant Treasurer; Minister for Veterans
Gabrielle Williams, MP	Minister for Women; Minister for Prevention of Family Violence; Minister for Aboriginal Affairs (from 23 March 2020); Minister for Youth (until 23 March 2020)
Lily D'Ambrosio, MP	Minister for Energy, Environment and Climate Change; Minister for Solar Homes
Jaala Pulford, MLC	Minister for Roads; Minister for Road Safety and the TAC; Minister for Fishing and Boating
Luke Donnellan, MP	Minister for Child Protection; Minister for Disability, Ageing and Carers
Ben Carroll, MP	Minister for Crime Prevention; Minister for Corrections; Minister for Youth Justice (Victoria); Minister for Victim Support
Adem Somyurek, MLC	Minister for Local Government; Minister for Small Business
Marlene Kairouz, MP	Minister for Consumer Affairs, Gaming and Liquor Regulation; Minister for Suburban Development
Gayle Tierney, MLC	Minister for Training and Skills; Minister for Higher Education
Melissa Horne, MP	Minister for Public Transport; Minister for Ports and Freight
Ros Spence, MP	Minister for Multicultural Affairs (from 23 March 2020); Minister for Community Sport (from 23 March 2020); Minister for Youth (from 23 March 2020)
Former Ministers
Gavin Jennings, MLC	Leader of the Government in the Legislative Council (until 23 March 2020); Special Minister of State (until 23 March 2020); Minister for Priority Precincts (until 23 March 2020); Minister for Aboriginal Affairs (until 23 March 2020)

== Crisis Council of Cabinet ==
The Crisis Council of Cabinet was established on 3 April 2020 as a response to the COVID-19 pandemic. It consists of the premier and seven ministers who were all sworn in via video conference. The Crisis Council of Cabinet and its positions were abolished in November that year.

Minister	Portfolio
Daniel Andrews, MP	Premier; Chair – Crisis Council of Cabinet
James Merlino, MP	Deputy Premier; Minister for the Coordination of Education and Training – COVID-19
Tim Pallas, MP	Treasurer; Minister for the Coordination of Treasury and Finance – COVID-19
Jill Hennessy, MP	Attorney-General; Minister for the Coordination of Justice and Community Safety – COVID-19
Jacinta Allan, MP	Minister for the Coordination of Transport – COVID-19
Martin Foley, MP	Minister for the Coordination of Health and Human Services – COVID-19 (from 26 September 2020)
Martin Pakula, MP	Minister for the Coordination of Jobs, Precincts and Regions – COVID 19
Lisa Neville, MP	Minister for the Coordination of Environment, Land, Water and Planning – COVID-19
Former Ministers
Jenny Mikakos, MLC	Minister for the Coordination of Health and Human Services – COVID-19 (until 26 September 2020)

== See also ==
- Opposition Shadow ministry of Michael O'Brien (2018-2021)
- Opposition Second shadow ministry of Matthew Guy (2021-2022)

Parliament of Victoria
Preceded by First Andrews ministry	Second Andrews ministry 2018–2022	Succeeded by Third Andrews ministry
