= First Andrews ministry =

69th ministry of the Government of Victoria, Australia

- 69th ministry of Victoria, Australia
- Date formed: 4 December 2014
- Date dissolved: 29 November 2018

People and organisations
- Monarch: Elizabeth II
- Governor: Alex Chernov (until 30 June 2015); Linda Dessau (since 30 June 2015)
- Premier: Daniel Andrews
- Deputy premier: James Merlino
- No. of ministers: 22
- Member party: Labor
- Status in legislature: Majority government
- Opposition party: Liberal–National Coalition
- Opposition leader: Matthew Guy (Liberal)

History
- Election: 2014 state election
- Predecessor: Napthine ministry
- Successor: Second Andrews ministry

The First Andrews ministry was the 69th ministry of the Government of Victoria. The Labor Government, led by the Premier, Daniel Andrews, and Deputy Premier, James Merlino, was officially sworn in on 4 December 2014, following the 2014 state election, which was held on 29 November 2014. At the time of its formation, the Ministry comprised 22 ministers, five of which were members of the Victorian Legislative Council and 17 who were members of the Victorian Legislative Assembly. At the time, nine ministers were women.

The First Andrews ministry succeeded the Napthine Ministry. It was replaced by the Second Andrews ministry.

== First Andrews ministry, 2014-2018 ==
Minister	Portfolio
Daniel Andrews, MP	Premier
James Merlino, MP	Deputy Premier; Minister for Education; Minister for Emergency Services (from 10 June 2016)
Tim Pallas, MP	Treasurer; Minister for Resources (from 16 October 2017)
Martin Pakula, MP	Attorney-General; Minister for Racing
Gavin Jennings, MLC	Special Minister of State; Leader of the Government in the Legislative Council
Jacinta Allan, MP	Minister for Public Transport; Minister for Major Projects (from 23 May 2016); Minister for Employment (until 23 May 2016)
Jill Hennessy, MP	Minister for Health; Minister for Ambulance Services
Martin Foley, MP	Minister for Housing, Disability and Ageing; Minister for Mental Health; Minister for Equality; Minister for Creative Industries
Richard Wynne, MP	Minister for Planning
Jaala Pulford, MLC	Deputy Leader of the Government in the Legislative Council; Minister for Agriculture; Minister for Regional Development
John Eren, MP	Minister for Tourism and Major Events; Minister for Sport; Minister for Veterans' Affairs
Lisa Neville, MP	Minister for Police (from 23 May 2016); Minister for Water (from 23 May 2016); Minister for Environment, Climate Change and Water (until 23 May 2016)
Robin Scott, MP	Minister for Finance; Minister for Multicultural Affairs
Natalie Hutchins, MP	Minister for Women (from 13 September 2017); Minister for Prevention of Family Violence (from 13 September 2017); Minister for Aboriginal Affairs; Minister for Industrial Relations; Minister for Local Government (until 13 September 2017)
Lily D'Ambrosio, MP	Minister for Energy, Environment and Climate Change (from 23 May 2016); Minister for Suburban Development (from 23 May 2016); Minister for Industry (until 23 May 2016); Minister for Energy and Resources (until 23 May 2016)
Luke Donnellan, MP	Minister for Roads and Road Safety; Minister for Ports
Jenny Mikakos, MLC	Minister for Families and Children; Minister for Youth Affairs; Minister for Early Childhood Education (from 16 October 2017)
Philip Dalidakis, MLC	Minister for Small Business (from 16 October 2017); Minister for Trade and Investment (from 16 October 2017); Minister for Innovation and the Digital Economy (from 16 October 2017); Minister for Small Business, Innovation and Trade (31 July 2015 – 16 October 2017)
Marlene Kairouz, MP	Minister for Local Government (from 13 September 2017); Minister for Consumer Affairs, Gaming and Liquor Regulation (from 20 June 2016)
Gayle Tierney, MLC	Minister for Training and Skills (from 9 November 2016); Minister for Corrections (from 9 November 2016)
Ben Carroll, MP	Minister for Industry and Employment (from 16 October 2017)
Former Ministers
Wade Noonan, MP	Minister for Industry and Employment (23 May 2016 – 15 October 2017); Minister for Resources (23 May 2016 – 15 October 2017); Minister for Police (until 23 May 2016); Minister for Corrections (until 23 May 2016)
Fiona Richardson, MP	Minister for Women (until 23 August 2017); Minister for Prevention of Family Violence (until 23 August 2017)
Steve Herbert, MLC	Minister for Training and Skills (until 9 November 2016); Minister for International Education (23 May – 9 November 2016 ); Minister for Corrections (23 May – 9 November 2016)
Jane Garrett, MP	Minister for Consumer Affairs, Gaming and Liquor Regulation (until 10 June 2016); Minister for Emergency Services (until 10 June 2016)
Adem Somyurek, MLC	Minister for Small Business, Innovation and Trade (until 29 July 2015)

== Reshuffles ==
Adem Somyurek stood down from his ministerial role in May 2015, and resigned as minister on 28 July 2015. He was succeeded in the ministry by Philip Dalidakis on 31 July 2015.

A reshuffle in May 2016 saw a change in responsibilities for several ministers.

On 10 June 2016, Jane Garrett, the Minister for Emergency Services, quit the Ministry, and Marlene Kairouz was brought into the Ministry on 20 June.

On 9 November 2016, Steve Herbert, the Minister for Corrections, Training and Skills and International Education, resigned from the Ministry. Gayle Tierney was appointed to the ministry and took over the corrections, training and skills portfolios. The portfolio of international education was not replaced.

On 23 August 2017, Fiona Richardson died. Natalie Hutchins took over Richardson's roles as Minister for Women and Minister for Prevention of Family Violence, but relinquished her role as Minister for Local Government to Marlene Kairouz.

On 15 October 2017, Wade Noonan resigned from the ministry. On 16 October, Ben Carroll was elevated to the ministry and took over as Minister for Industry and Employment, while Tim Pallas took over as Minister for Resources. Other ministral adjustments were also undertaken.

Parliament of Victoria
Preceded by Napthine Ministry	First Andrews ministry 2014–2018	Succeeded by Second Andrews ministry
