= Minister for Employment =

Minister for Employment may refer to:

- Minister for Employment (Victoria), Australia
- Minister for Employment and Workplace Relations, Australia
- Department for Work and Pensions, United Kingdom
