= Minister for Innovation (Victoria) =

Australian state ministry portfolio

Minister for Innovation of Victoria
- Victorian coat of arms

- Flag of Victoria
- Style: The Honourable
- Member of: Parliament; Executive Council
- Reports to: Premier
- Nominator: Premier
- Appointer: Governor on the recommendation of the premier
- Term length: At the governor's pleasure
- Inaugural holder: John Brumby MP
- Formation: 12 February 2002
- Final holder: Ben Carroll MP
- Abolished: 2 October 2023

The Minister for Innovation was a minister within the Executive Council of Victoria.

== Ministers ==
Order	MP	Party affiliation	Ministerial title	Term start	Term end	Time in office	Notes
1	John Brumby MP	Labor	Minister for Innovation	12 February 2002	3 August 2007	5 years, 172 days	
2	Gavin Jennings MLC	Labor	Minister for Innovation	3 August 2007	2 December 2010	3 years, 121 days	
3	Louise Asher MP	Liberal	Minister for Innovation, Services and Small Business	2 December 2010	17 March 2014	3 years, 105 days	
3	Louise Asher MP	Liberal	Minister for Innovation	17 March 2014	4 December 2014	262 days	
4	Adem Somyurek MLC	Labor	Minister for Small Business, Innovation and Trade	4 December 2014	28 July 2015	236 days	
5	Philip Dalidakis MLC	Labor	Minister for Small Business, Innovation and Trade	31 July 2015	29 November 2018	3 years, 121 days	
6	Jaala Pulford MLC	Labor	Minister for Innovation, Medical Research and the Digital Economy	22 June 2020	5 December 2022	2 years, 166 days	
7	Martin Pakula MP	Labor	Minister for Jobs, Innovation and Trade	29 November 2018	22 June 2020	1 year, 206 days	
8	Ben Carroll MP	Labor	Minister for Industry and Innovation	5 December 2022	2 October 2023	301 days	
