= Minister for Medical Research =

Minister for Medical Research may refer to:

- Minister for Medical Research (Victoria)
- Minister for Medical Research (New South Wales)
