= Jacinta Allan =

Premier of Victoria from 2023 to 2026

The Honourable Jacinta Allan MP
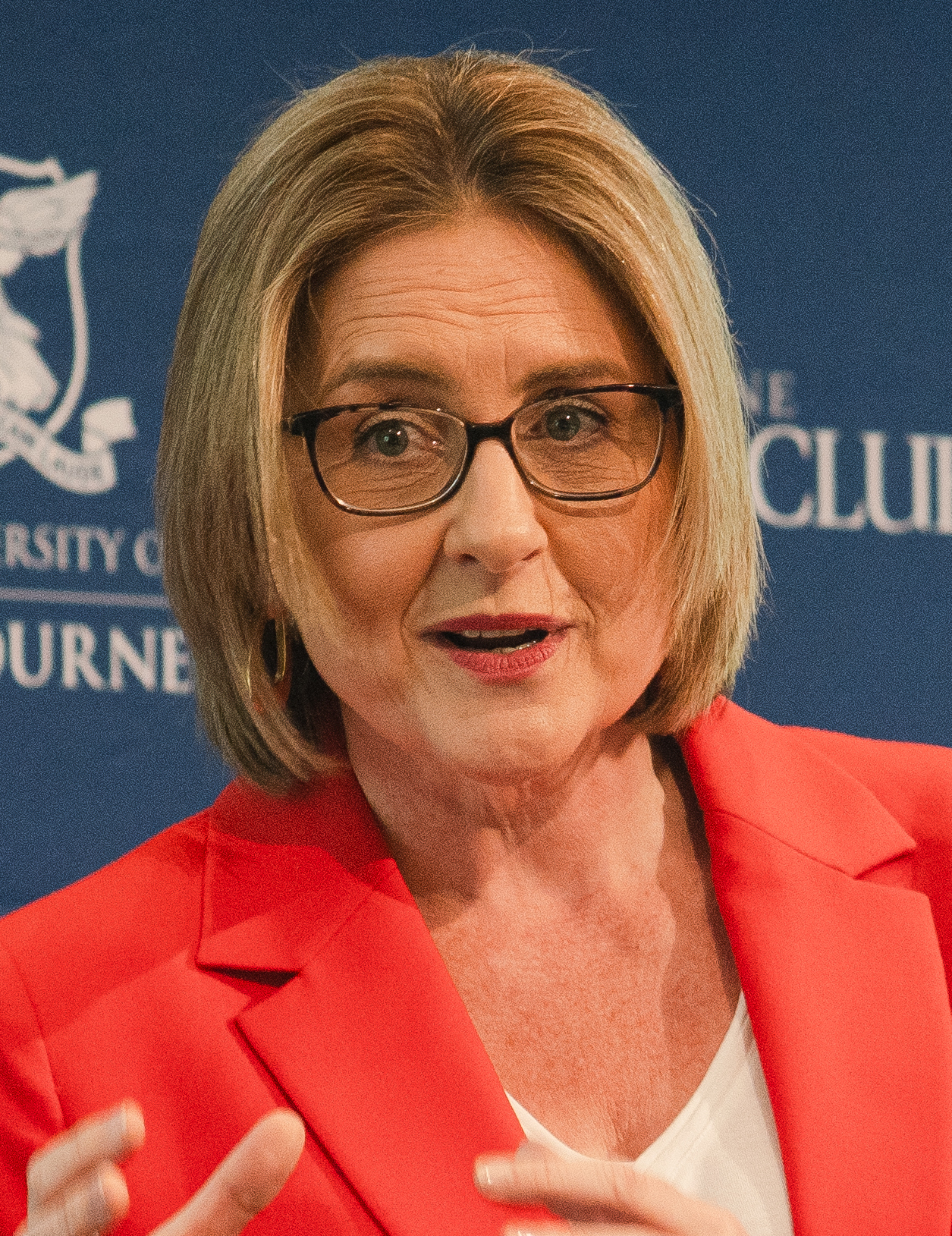
- Allan in 2024

49th Premier of Victoria
- In office 27 September 2023 – 28 July 2026
- Monarch: Charles III
- Governor: Margaret Gardner
- Deputy: Ben Carroll
- Preceded by: Daniel Andrews
- Succeeded by: Ben Carroll

18th Leader of the Victorian Labor Party
- In office 27 September 2023 – 28 July 2026
- Deputy: Ben Carroll
- Preceded by: Daniel Andrews
- Succeeded by: Gabrielle Williams (interim); Ben Carroll
Other offices held
Deputy Premier of Victoria
In office 27 June 2022 – 27 September 2023
Premier	Daniel Andrews
Preceded by	James Merlino
Succeeded by	Ben Carroll
Deputy Leader of the Victorian Labor Party
In office 25 June 2022 – 27 September 2023
Leader	Daniel Andrews
Preceded by	James Merlino
Succeeded by	Ben Carroll
Minister for Commonwealth Games Delivery
In office 5 December 2022 – 20 July 2023
Premier	Daniel Andrews
Preceded by	Justin Madden (2002–2006)
Succeeded by	Office abolished
Minister for the Suburban Rail Loop
In office 22 June 2020 – 2 October 2023
Premier	Daniel Andrews
Preceded by	Office established
Succeeded by	Danny Pearson
Minister for Transport and Infrastructure
In office 4 December 2014 – 2 October 2023
Premier	Daniel Andrews
Preceded by	Terry Mulder (as Minister for Public Transport and Minister for Roads)
Succeeded by	Danny Pearson
Leader of the House
In office 4 December 2014 – 27 June 2022
Premier	Daniel Andrews
Preceded by	Louise Asher
Succeeded by	Lizzie Blandthorn

Member of the Victorian Parliament for Bendigo East
- Incumbent
- Assumed office 18 September 1999
- Preceded by: Michael John

Personal details
- Born: Jacinta Marie Allan; 19 September 1973 (age 53) Bendigo, Victoria, Australia
- Party: Labor
- Spouses: Ben Davis (m. 2004–2008) Yorick Piper (m. 2012)
- Children: 2
- Education: La Trobe University (BA)
- Profession: Politician
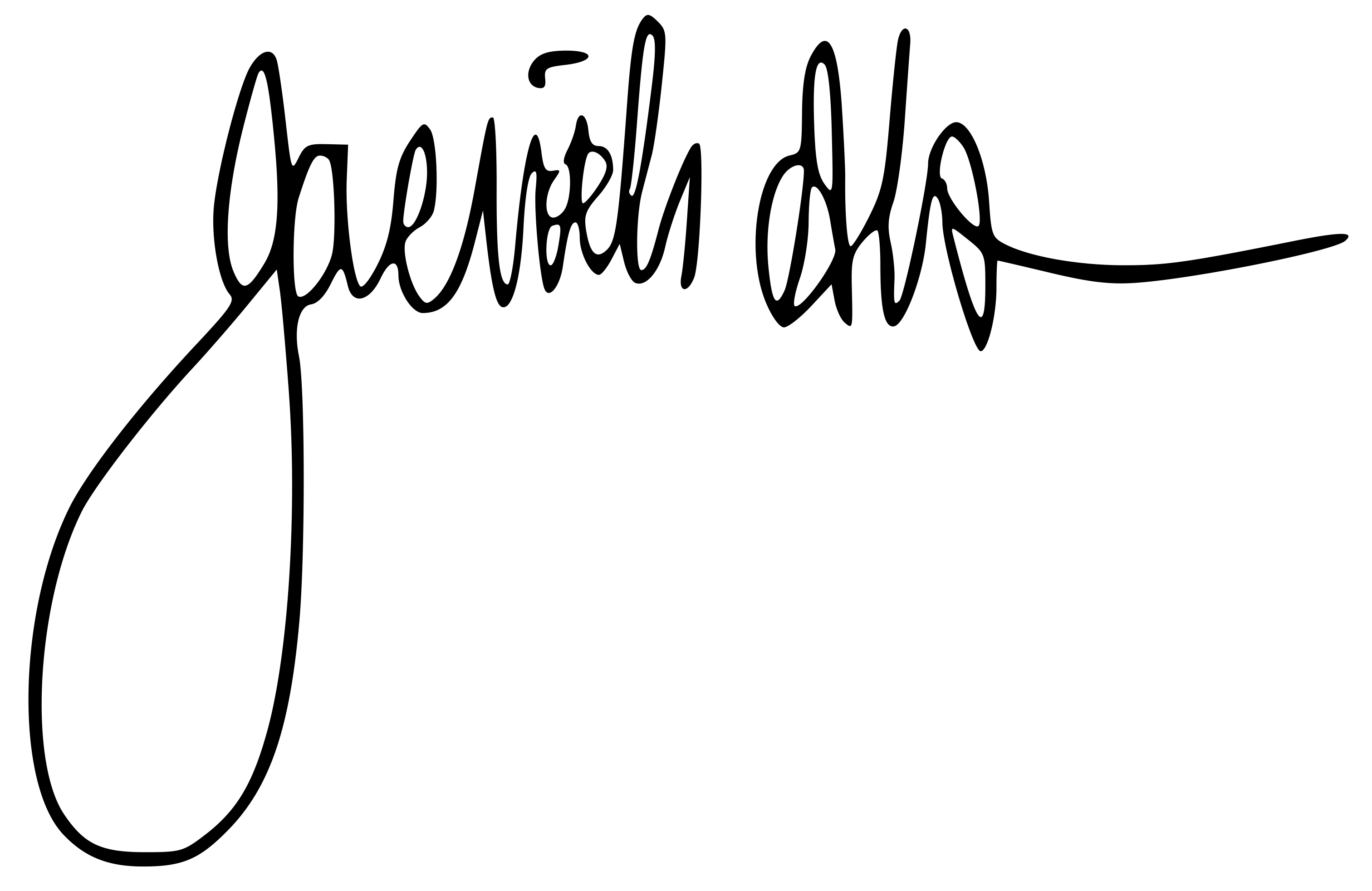
- Signature
- Website: Government website Personal website

Jacinta Marie Allan (born 19 September 1973) is an Australian politician who served as the 49th premier of Victoria and leader of the Victorian Labor Party from 2023 to 2026. She has been the member of the Legislative Assembly (MP) for the district of Bendigo East since 1999.

Born in Bendigo, Allan was elected to the Legislative Assembly at the 1999 state election at the age of 25, becoming the youngest female parliamentarian in Victorian history. She entered the ministry in 2002, serving in a range of portfolios including education, skills, and regional development under premiers Steve Bracks and John Brumby. During this period she oversaw initiatives to address teacher shortages, initiated a review of school governance, and faced criticism over school funding and infrastructure.

Following Labor's defeat at the 2010 state election, Allan served in the opposition shadow ministry under Daniel Andrews. When Labor returned to government in 2014, she was appointed Minister for Public Transport and later Minister for Transport and Infrastructure, overseeing major infrastructure projects including the Suburban Rail Loop, Metro Tunnel, and Melbourne Airport Rail. Allan was appointed as the 29th deputy premier in June 2022 following the resignation of James Merlino, a promotion widely interpreted as positioning her as Andrews' eventual successor.

Allan became premier on 27 September 2023 after Andrews' resignation, the second woman to hold the position after Joan Kirner. As premier, Allan pursued a program of housing and planning reform, including overhauling planning laws to reduce approval times and rezone areas near transport hubs for higher-density development. Her government oversaw the completion of the Metro Tunnel and West Gate Tunnel projects, and enacted Australia's first treaty with First Peoples. Her premiership was also marked by challenges including a corruption scandal involving the Construction, Forestry and Maritime Employees Union (CFMEU) and declining approval ratings. Her government's plan to demolish and rebuild public housing towers faced sustained opposition from tenants and advocacy groups.

In the lead up to the 2026 state election, Allan faced declining approval ratings and growing frustration within her party and amongst the broader Victorian public. Ahead of an expected leadership challenge, she announced her resignation as premier and leader of the Labor Party on 28 July 2026, and was succeeded by her deputy premier, Ben Carroll. On 14 August 2026, Allan announced she would retire from politics at the 2026 Victorian state election.

== Early life ==
Allan was born on 19 September 1973 in Bendigo, Victoria. A member of a prominent Bendigo political family, she is the granddaughter of William Allan who was the president of the Bendigo Trades Hall Council. William Allan declined an offer of Labor Party preselection for the federal seat of Bendigo in 1960, instead recommending Noel Beaton as a candidate. Her father, Peter Allan, played for South Melbourne in the VFL under-19s in 1963 and was a State Electricity Commission worker as well as a member of the Electrical Trades Union. She described her father as an "avid Labor man".

Allan was educated at St Joseph's Primary School in Quarry Hill and at Catholic College Bendigo. Allan described herself as an "average student" in high school. She completed the degree of Bachelor of Arts (Hons) at La Trobe University. While at university she worked part-time as a grocery bagger at Coles.

== Early political career ==
Allan joined the ALP at the age of 19. At age 20, she was a delegate to the Young Labor Conference. She became secretary of the Bendigo South branch of the ALP at 21, and by 24 was secretary of the Bendigo Federal Electoral Assembly. She interned for federal MP Lindsay Tanner during her honours year at university and subsequently worked as a political staffer for Steve Gibbons, the member for Bendigo and Neil O'Keefe, the member for Burke. In 1997, she was one of the leaders of a campaign to prevent a lap dancing bar from opening in Bendigo.

Allan was first elected at the 1999 state election at the age of 25, making her the youngest ever elected female parliamentarian in Victoria. She was approached by Gibbons to contest the seat of Bendigo East against incumbent Liberal minister Michael John, who had held the seat since 1985. The task was considered by many within the Labor Party, including Allan herself, to be unlikely to succeed. Despite the Kennett government losing support in regional areas, a swing of over five per cent was required for Allan to win. According to her friend and colleague Bob Cameron, Gibbons viewed the candidacy as an opportunity for Allan to "gain some experience for another day."

Allan was preselected a year before the election, and door-knocked approximately 10,000 homes across two-thirds of the electorate, wearing through two pairs of shoes in the process. Ultimately, she defeated John with an 8.1% swing, winning 48.4% of the primary vote and 53.1% of the two-party-preferred vote. Her victory was part of a large swing to Labor in regional Victoria which helped Labor form a minority government with the support of three independents.

In her maiden speech to Parliament, Allan criticised the previous Kennett government's policies, arguing they had left country Victorians as "prime losers" under a regime of "economic rationalism" that resulted in job losses, school closures, and the privatisation of public assets.

=== Bracks/Brumby governments (2002–2010) ===
Allan retained her seat at the 2002 election winning 56.4% of the primary vote and 63.0% of the two-party-preferred vote—a 10.1% swing toward her. She entered the ministry after the election, serving as Minister for Education Services and Minister for Employment and Youth Affairs from 5 December 2002. She was the youngest Victorian government minister since Alfred Deakin in the 1880s. Reflecting on her promotion, former premier Steve Bracks later described Allan as "talented, skilled and articulate", noting that he believed both she and fellow rising star Tim Holding had the potential to become premier and that he wanted to "give [Allan] a go."

In January 2004, as Minister for Education Services, Allan announced a series of initiatives to address teacher shortages in rural and hard-to-staff schools. These included the Career Change program to recruit professionals from other fields into teaching, and a Rural Retraining program to help existing teachers gain qualifications in subject areas with high demand.

In April 2004, Allan faced criticism following the leak of a Department of Education briefing note. The document, written by the department's general manager of communications, requested that staff quickly submit ideas for a "comprehensive plan" of media events for the minister. The leak led to criticism that public resources were being used to raise Allan's personal profile. Allan defended the practice, stating it was normal procedure for departments to organise media opportunities and that the incident had been overstated.

In March 2005, Allan initiated a public review of governance arrangements for government schools, aimed at clarifying the roles and responsibilities of school councils.

In 2005 Allan's portfolio attracted controversy following a proposal to change funding arrangements for new students with disabilities attending specialist or mainstream schools. The proposed structure would have reduced funding for some students, prompting criticism from parents and advocacy groups. The government subsequently announced additional funding for the program. The physical condition of Victoria's schools was also criticised during her tenure as Minister. The Shadow Minister for Education Victor Perton described them as being in a "third world" condition, as well as Brian Caldwell, a former dean of education at the University of Melbourne stated that they were "deplorable". Allan dismissed the concerns, saying that the cause was neglect from the previous Kennett government.

At the 2006 election in November, Allan suffered a 7.6% swing against her although retained the seat with 55.35% of the two-party-preferred vote. The Labor Party as a whole lost 7 seats to the Liberal and National parties at this election. Following a post-election cabinet reshuffle in December, Allan's responsibilities were altered slightly, losing Youth Affairs in exchange for Women's Affairs. In March 2007 she presided over a ban of YouTube in Victorian government schools, in response to incidents of cyber-bullying on the platform.

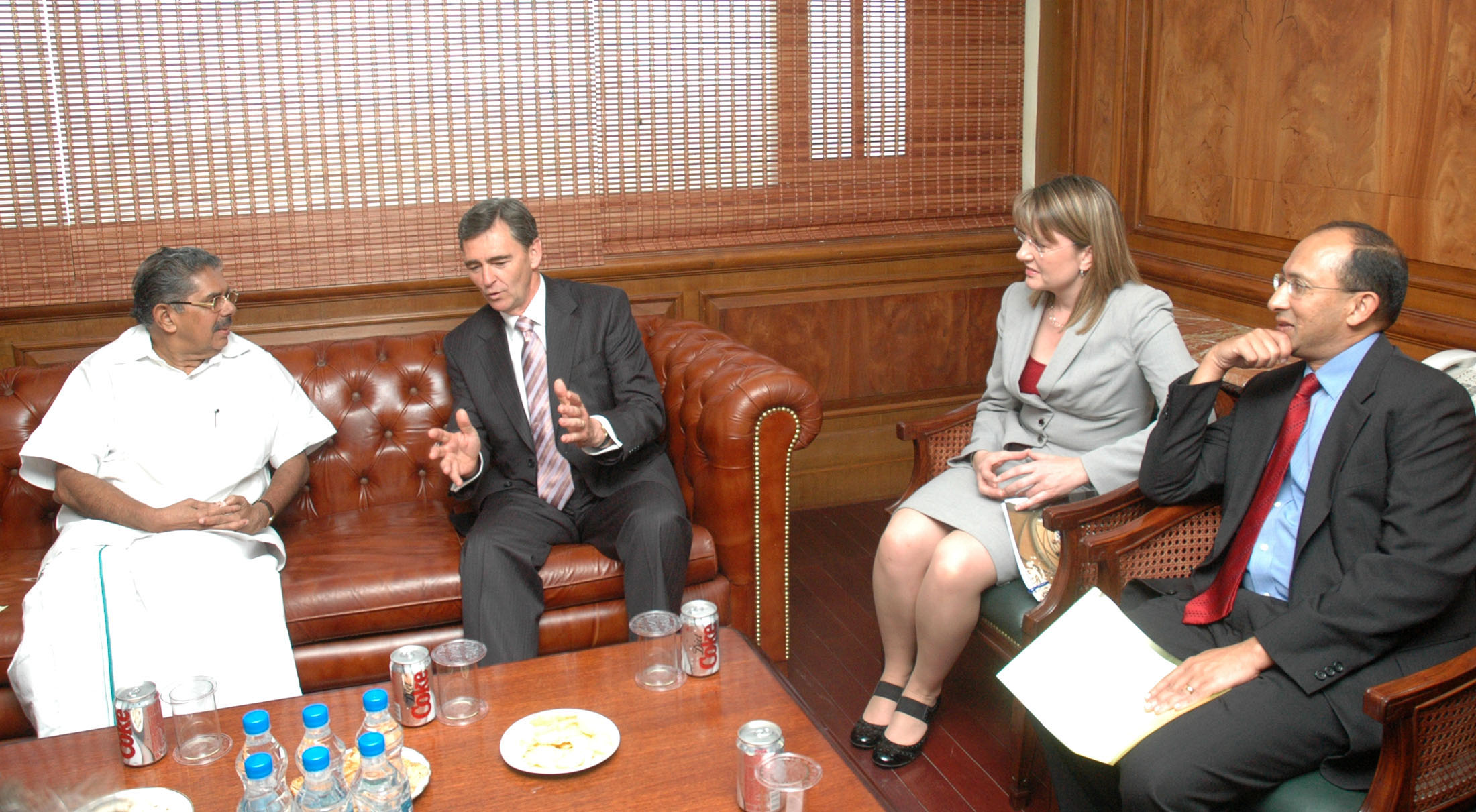
Allan and Brumby meeting with Minister of Overseas Indian Affairs, Vayalar Ravi, in New Delhi, 2009

She was promoted in August 2007, in a reshuffle sparked by the accession of John Brumby to the premiership where she received the portfolios of Skills and Workforce Participation and Regional and Rural Development. Brumby, who had held the regional development portfolio himself before becoming premier, had represented the federal seat of Bendigo from 1983 to 1990 and maintained a farm near the city.

In September 2009, Allan accompanied Brumby on a trade mission to India aimed at reassuring Indian students and their families following a series of attacks on Indian students in Melbourne, and announced a $2.7 million support package for international students.

In 2010, she became Minister for Industry and Trade. Allan was targeted by Right to Life organisations during her election campaign in 2010, having voted for abortion reform in parliament during 2008.

In the lead-up to the 2010 state election, Allan's seat of Bendigo East was considered vulnerable. The government directed significant resources to the electorate, a strategy some Labor figures privately dubbed the "Save Jacinta Project". On state budget day in May 2010, Brumby travelled to Bendigo to announce $473 million in funding for a new hospital, described as the largest single investment in a regional hospital in Victoria's history. Allan's personal connections to Brumby drew attention during this period. Her partner, Yorick Piper, worked as a senior political adviser to the Premier, and Brumby's sister-in-law was employed in Allan's electorate office. Brumby rejected suggestions the regional spending was politically motivated, describing it as sound policy building on the government's record in regional Victoria.

While Allan retained her seat at the election, albeit with a 1.5% swing against her, Labor lost the election, winning 43 of 88 seats in the Legislative Assembly, two short of the 45 needed for a majority. Allan won 43.8% of the primary vote and 53.8% of the two-party-preferred vote in Bendigo East.

=== Opposition (2010–2014) ===
After the defeat of the Brumby government in November 2010, Daniel Andrews was elected as leader of the Labor Party. In an interview Allan said that "[Andrews] will not only survive the next four years, but we'll be running this as a very, very strong Opposition." Allan became manager of opposition business in the Legislative Assembly, as well as opposition spokeswoman for Roads, Regional and Rural Development and Bushfire Response. Allan also served as police and emergency services spokesperson.

In a reshuffle announced in December 2013, Allan became Shadow Minister for Agriculture, Regional Cities and Regional & Rural Development, in addition to her responsibilities as Manager of Opposition Business.

== Andrews government (2014–2023) ==
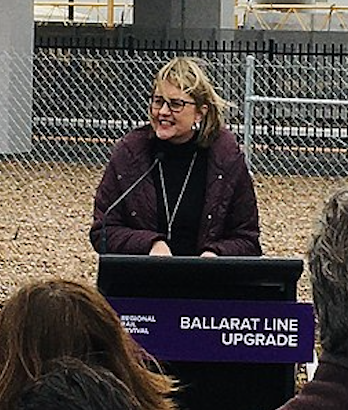
Allan in 2019

After the 2014 state election, Allan was appointed Minister for Public Transport and Minister for Employment in the First Andrews Ministry.

In May 2018, under parliamentary privilege, Allan accused the Liberal Party of inciting violence against her family during a parliamentary committee hearing into compensation for taxi licence holders affected by the rise of ride-sharing services such as Uber. She told the committee she had received death threats and that there had been references to her children and husband on social media, including comments expressing surprise that she had "not been killed by now." Liberal MP Tim Smith stated that he had never endorsed any such posts and rejected the accusation as an "outrageous slur". Opposition spokesperson David Davis stated that "all people in public life have been victims of online abuse".

In August 2018, Allan directed Metro Trains to stop playing Sky News on television screens at railway stations in Melbourne after they aired an interview with Neo-Nazi Blair Cottrell. Allan stated that "Hatred and racism have no place on our screens or in our community." Sky News later admitted that it was wrong to air the interview. The decision drew criticism from opposition leader Matthew Guy said that the decision was an "over-reaction". Sky News political editor David Speers was highly critical of the decision, noting that the network had confirmed the Cottrell interview had not actually aired on the railway station screens and suggested that the Andrews government was motivated by frustration over its coverage on Sky News and in the Herald Sun, both owned by News Corp. Allan denied that the decision was censorship.

Following Labor's victory in the 2018 state election, Allan was appointed Minister for Transport and Infrastructure in the Second Andrews Ministry. The portfolio included a large package of projects such as the Suburban Rail Loop, Metro Tunnel, and Melbourne Airport Rail. During her tenure as Minister, some Labor MPs were reportedly critical of her performance in the infrastructure portfolio, particularly regarding delays to projects such as the Airport Rail link.

In September 2022, the government released the business case for the Airport Rail project, with Allan advocating for an above-ground station at the airport, a design she stated would be quicker to build, less disruptive, and save up to $1 billion compared to an underground option. The same day, an auditor-general's report was critical of the project's planning, finding the business case was delivered "too late to inform key government decisions" and that the consideration of alternatives was insufficient. By April 2023, Allan confirmed that the original 2029 completion date for the Airport Rail would not be met. She attributed the delay to what she described as "challenging" and "frustrating" negotiations with Melbourne Airport over construction logistics, stating the pace of talks had been "slower than I would have liked." Melbourne Airport responded that it supported the project but was awaiting clarification on the completion date, reiterating its preference for an underground station.

During the Victorian Government's response to the COVID-19 health emergency, Allan became a member of the Crisis Council of Cabinet, serving as the Minister for the Coordination of Transport – COVID-19. In this role, she became responsible for leading all COVID-19 response activities across the transport portfolio.

In June 2022, following the resignation of six ministers from the Andrews government, Allan was appointed Deputy Premier of Victoria, succeeding James Merlino. The appointment was unanimously endorsed by the Victorian Labor caucus. Her promotion contradicted Labor convention, as both Andrews and Allan are members of the party's Left faction, whereas the two jobs were traditionally shared between the left and right factions. However, Andrews disputed the existence of any such convention, pointing to previous Labor governments where the leadership team was not factionally balanced. Her elevation to the deputy leadership, alongside her existing role overseeing Victoria's major transport projects, positioned her as the presumed successor to Andrews. Political observers noted at the time that the reshuffle had effectively designated Allan as "premier-in-waiting". Andrews, however, denied that he had talked to Allan about a leadership handover.

== Premier of Victoria (2023–2026) ==
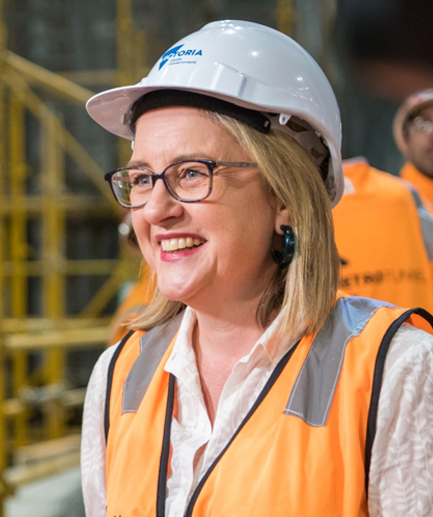
Allan in 2023

Following the resignation of Daniel Andrews on 26 September 2023, a party caucus was held the following day. Allan was elected as Leader of the Labor Party and consequently the 49th Premier of Victoria unopposed after negotiations within party factions. She is the second woman, after Joan Kirner, to lead the state.

Andrews had planned extensively for Allan's succession. In the years prior to his resignation, he had grown their shared Left faction to significantly outnumber the Right, ensuring Allan could fend off any leadership challenge. Two months before his resignation, he announced the cancellation of the 2026 Commonwealth Games, and a week before departing released a landmark housing statement, giving Allan policy initiatives to promote in her early weeks as premier.

Despite these preparations, Allan's first week in office was turbulent. Before Andrews' resignation had formally taken effect, the Labor Right faction threatened a leadership challenge, forcing Allan to install Ben Carroll as her deputy. The episode was interpreted by some commentators as indicating she did not hold the same level of internal authority as her predecessor. Allan responded by allowing Carroll to choose his portfolio but excluding him from the powerful expenditure review committee, which remained composed of her allies: Treasurer Tim Pallas, Assistant Treasurer Danny Pearson, and Attorney-General Jaclyn Symes.

On 8 February 2024, Allan delivered an apology to Victorians who experienced historical abuse and neglect as children in institutional care.

On 19 May 2024, while attending the Labor State Conference, Allan was impacted by a protest in opposition to Labor policies regarding the ongoing Israel Hamas conflict. Security and police found themselves outnumbered by the rally, and Allan and the Australian prime minister were temporarily detained within the venue. Allan later spoke against the protesters, accusing them of bringing violence, antisemitism and homophobia to the event, which she said disgusted her. A statement from Trade Unionists for Palestine said it had support from numerous unions for the demonstration, as well as other pro-Palestinian groups such as Mums for Palestine. "ALP in both state and federal government is aiding and abetting the genocide of Palestinian people and must be called out and condemned at every opportunity," the statement said.

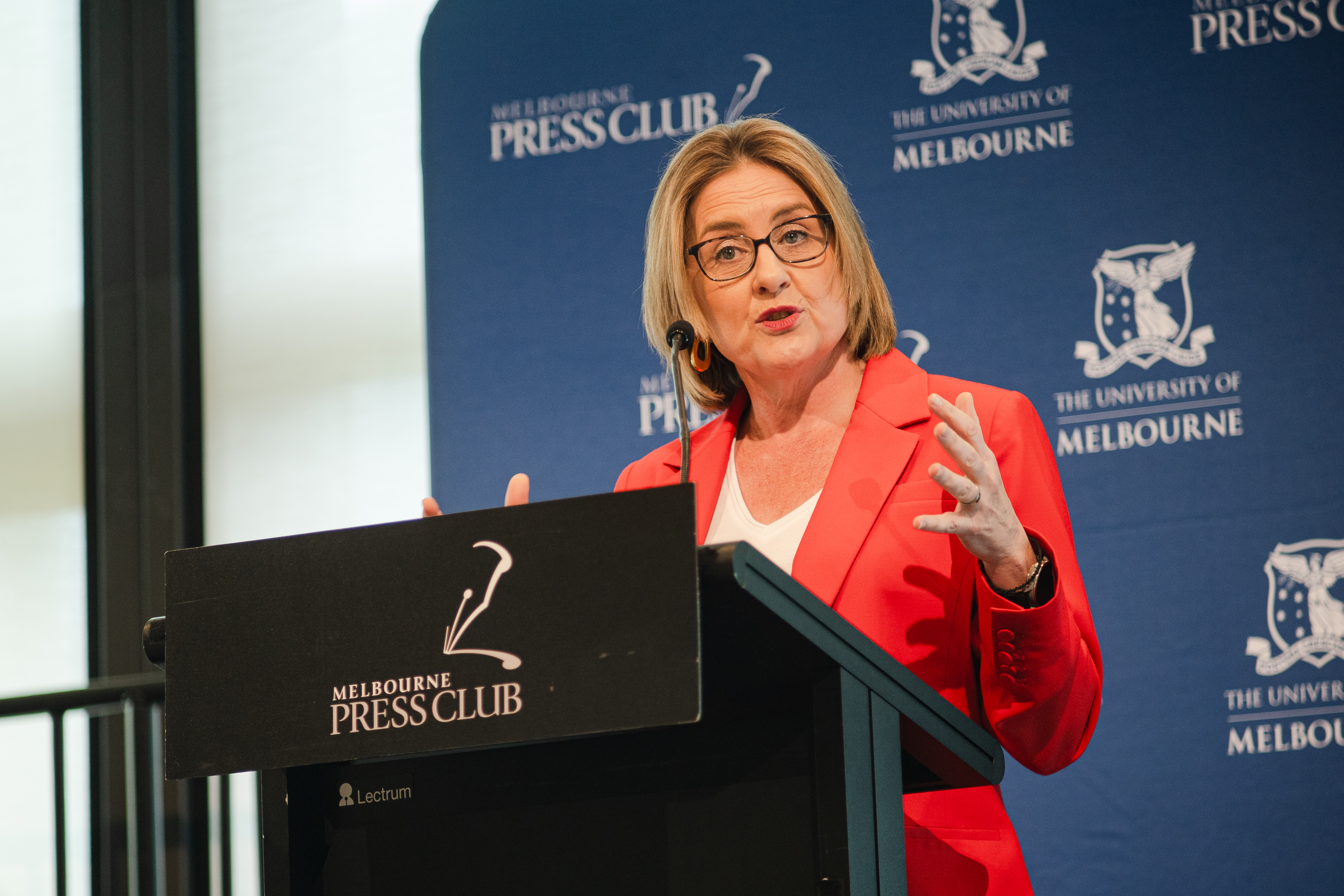
Allan addressing at the Melbourne Press Club, October 2024

In December 2024, Allan's Treasurer Tim Pallas resigned from the position, as well as from his seat of Werribee. This triggered a by-election which was held on 8 February 2025. Werribee, a traditionally safe seat for Labor that was held on a two-party-preferred vote of 60.9% at the 2022 election, saw Labor's primary vote collapse to 28.6% and its two-party-preferred result reduced to 50.82%. Although Labor candidate John Lister held onto the seat, the result was interpreted as a major loss for the government. Allan later acknowledged the government needed to do more to address voters' concerns, with the deputy premier, Ben Carroll, stating that the party had heard voters "loud and clear".

In April 2025, polling showed Allan's net satisfaction rating had fallen to minus 35, the lowest of any political leader in Australia at the time. The same poll indicated Labor's primary vote had fallen to 29% while the Coalition had risen to 41% Political commentators noted that Allan's unpopularity risked damaging federal Labor's prospects in the upcoming May federal election, with several marginal Victorian seats seen as vulnerable. When asked if she would stand aside at the request of her colleagues, Allan responded that she was a "fighter" and focused on "those things that Labor governments focus on for Victorians" Despite these pre-election concerns that Allan's unpopularity would damage federal Labor's prospects in Victoria, the party achieved significant swings in several key seats across the state, including the previously Liberal-held seats of Menzies and Deakin. The polling led to speculation among political commentators about a potential leadership challenge following the upcoming federal election, with Carroll as well as transport minister Gabrielle Williams mentioned as possible successors.

In March 2025, the Allan government announced that machetes would be classified as prohibited weapons from September 2025, requiring a police commissioner's approval for possession. The timeline was expedited following a brawl involving machetes at Northland Shopping Centre in Melbourne's north in June 2025, with Allan announcing an immediate ban on sales effective within days. The government established a 90-day amnesty period allowing people to surrender machetes at disposal bins located at police stations. After the amnesty window ended in November 2025, those found carrying machetes faced penalties of up to two years' imprisonment or fines exceeding $47,000. Allan stated in September 2025 that more than 5,000 weapons had been handed in during the amnesty, arguing the ban was "working" and that Victoria was "getting more of these dangerous weapons off our streets than any other state". Critics questioned the effectiveness of the ban, noting machetes remained readily available online and raising concerns about whether the measure addressed underlying causes of youth violence. Then opposition leader, Brad Battin, described the government's response as "a decision born of political panic, not public safety".

The May 2025 state budget, the second delivered under Allan's premiership and the first by her new treasurer, Jaclyn Symes, projected net debt to reach $194 billion by 2028–29, with cash deficits forecast to continue throughout the budget period. The budget also forecast a modest operating surplus of $1.6 billion for 2025–26, Victoria's first since before the COVID-19 pandemic, though economists noted this figure excluded the state's substantial infrastructure spending. The government announced cost-of-living measures including free public transport for children and seniors, while later seeking to attract private investment from superannuation funds for infrastructure projects. Economists warned that without structural changes to rein in operating costs, the state's interest bill—forecast to reach $10.6 billion annually by 2028–29—would exceed total spending on some social services.

In September 2025, Allan introduced the Statewide Treaty Bill 2025 in the Legislative Assembly, making Victoria the first Australian state to legislate a treaty with Indigenous peoples. The bill passed both houses of parliament and was signed into law in November 2025, following nearly a decade of advocacy and negotiation that began under the Andrews government in 2016. The legislation establishes a permanent representative body, Gellung Warl, comprising three arms: the elected First Peoples' Assembly, a truth-telling body to continue the work of the Yoorrook Justice Commission, and an accountability mechanism to monitor government progress on Closing the Gap. Allan described the signing as marking a "new chapter" in the state's history, "founded on truth, guided by respect and carried forward through partnership". The opposition Coalition voted against the legislation, with Brad Battin stating that a Liberal Nationals government would repeal the treaty if elected.

In August 2025, Allan announced plans to introduce legislation enshrining the right for Victorian workers to work from home at least two days per week. The proposal was formally detailed in March 2026, with the government confirming the laws would take effect from 1 September 2026, covering all employees who could "reasonably" perform their duties remotely, with a delayed commencement of 1 July 2027 for workplaces with fewer than 15 employees. Disputes would be handled by the Victorian Equal Opportunity and Human Rights Commission and, if unresolved, by the Victorian Civil and Administrative Tribunal. Allan framed the policy as a response to workers being denied reasonable requests, stating that "bosses who think being seen at a desk is more important than a parent getting home for dinner with their kids" would know where her government stood. The Committee for Melbourne criticised the plan as a "complete overreach" that would make Victoria "too hard to do business", while the Opposition Leader Brad Battin indicated possible support, stating his party would review any legislation to ensure it supported "flexibility, productivity and personal choice".

In September 2025, Allan visited China on a trip aimed at boosting tourism. She also launched a campaign to sell more Victorian products to Chinese consumers.

In late March 2026, Allan announced that public transport would be made free for April of that year due to the 2026 Iran war and the resulting fuel crisis.

=== Housing ===
Allan has made increasing housing supply a central focus of her premiership. In 2024, she announced a proposal to overhaul planning rules to allow taller buildings and increased housing density near train and tram stations in Melbourne.

In October 2024, Allan announced a review into making it easier to subdivide or build multiple houses on a block, stating that she wanted Victoria to be the "townhouse capital of Australia." The streamlined rules took effect in October 2025, reducing approval times for subdivisions and second dwellings from more than 60 days to 10 business days under the expanded VicSmart process.

In September 2025, the government released draft maps for 25 of the 50 proposed centres, showing maximum building heights of up to 16 storeys in suburbs including Hampton, Oakleigh, Kew, Auburn, Hawthorn, and along Sydney Road in Coburg and Brunswick. The proposal attracted criticism from some local residents and the opposition, with Liberal MP James Newbury accusing the government of "trying to turn Bayside into the Gold Coast".

In October 2025, Allan announced the most significant overhaul of Victoria's planning laws in a decade, describing the existing system as "old-fashioned Nimby-type laws" that needed to be replaced with a planning system that "says 'yes'" to new housing. The reforms proposed three new planning streams to reduce permit approval times: 10 days for stand-alone homes and duplexes, 30 days for townhouses and low-rise developments, and 60 days for larger developments, compared to the existing average of 140 days. The amendments would also limit third-party appeal rights—which allow anyone to object to a planning permit—restricting objections to directly affected neighbours for higher density apartments and scrapping them entirely for homes, duplexes and townhouses. Planning Minister Sonya Kilkenny stated the changes would bring Victoria "in line with all other states and territories", while Allan argued that "people who live a long way from where the project is being built shouldn't have the opportunity to stop those projects". The Property Council of Australia welcomed the reforms, stating they would "help reduce red tape, improve efficiency, and restore confidence in our planning framework", though the Municipal Association of Victoria criticised the lack of consultation with local government.

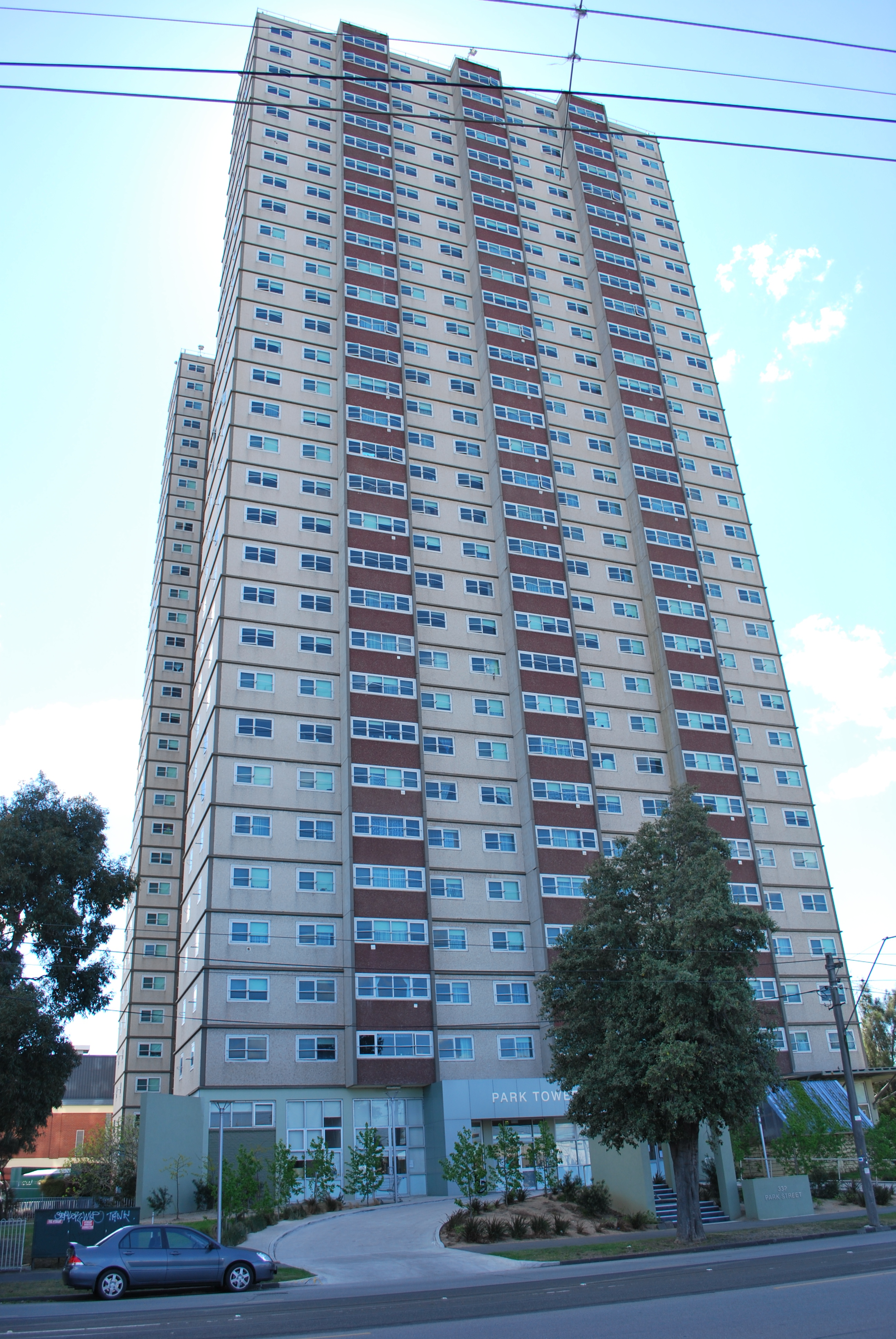
Public housing tower in South Melbourne

In September 2023, one of Daniel Andrews' final acts as premier was to announce a plan to demolish and redevelop all 44 of Victoria's public housing towers by 2051, in a project described as "Australia's biggest ever urban renewal project". The government argued the towers were outdated, unsafe and energy-inefficient, and promised to replace them with modern homes while increasing the number of residents from 10,000 to 30,000 through a mix of public, community and affordable housing. However, the announcement was made without prior consultation with residents, many of whom learned of the plan through leaflets distributed on the same day as Andrews' press conference.

The demolition has faced sustained opposition from tenants and advocacy groups with parties such as the Victorian Greens and Victorian Socialists opposing the demolition. In October 2024, a class action lawsuit on behalf of 479 households from three towers in Flemington and North Melbourne proceeded to the Supreme Court, arguing the government failed to properly consider residents' human rights and had not adequately explored alternatives such as retrofitting. During the proceedings, Allan described the plaintiffs as "a small number of people ... backed by the Greens political party, who have demonstrated that they don't want particularly vulnerable Victorians to have the dignity of a new modern home." Lead plaintiff Barry Berih described Allan's comments as "shameful". The Renters and Housing Union (RAHU) condemned Allan's comments, stating they portrayed a "diverse community as rubes" and attempted to "remove agency from the people who are actively being impacted by the Labor government's decisions".

A parliamentary inquiry into the redevelopment began in June 2025, hearing evidence from residents who described the plan as "reckless, arrogant, foolish, undermining and insulting." Housing Minister Harriet Shing defended the plan, stating that "these ageing towers will not stand the test of time" and accused the Greens and Victorian Socialists of "spreading misinformation". In January 2026, the government announced the next seven towers to be demolished, located in Albert Park, Flemington, Kensington, North Melbourne, Prahran and St Kilda. Advocacy groups expressed concern for elderly residents, with the Housing for the Aged Action Group stating that many had expected to live in the towers for the remainder of their lives. Relocations were scheduled to begin in July 2026 and conclude by February 2028.

Critics of the demolition approach have pointed to alternative proposals. An RMIT University-led report on the Barkly Street tower in Brunswick found that upgrading the existing building and adding new homes on the site would deliver social, economic and environmental benefits comparable to demolition, while reducing emissions by up to 44.5% and avoiding the disruption of relocating elderly residents. The researchers called for the government to independently test and publish site-by-site evidence on renewal options before committing to demolition.

=== Big Build CFMEU corruption scandal ===
In February 2026, the Allan government faced criticism following the release of a report by Geoffrey Watson SC into corruption within the Victorian branch of the Construction, Forestry and Maritime Employees Union (CFMEU). The report, commissioned by the federal government and tendered to a Queensland inquiry, alleged that under former boss John Setka the union had descended from a trade union into a "violent, hateful and greedy rabble" that "cultivated the company of underworld figures" and bikie gangs. Watson described the Setka-era CFMEU as "no longer a trade union, it was a crime syndicate", and alleged that government construction sites had been used as "drug distribution centres" with strippers performing on night shifts and bribes and extortion commonplace. Watson estimated the union's conduct had cost Victorian taxpayers approximately $15 billion on the Big Build, much of it "poured directly into the hands of criminals and organised crime gangs". He also alleged the Victorian government "knew and had a duty to know" about the corruption but did "nothing about it". The report's administrator initially removed two chapters containing these claims, stating he was "not satisfied that they were well-founded or properly tested", however they were later released.

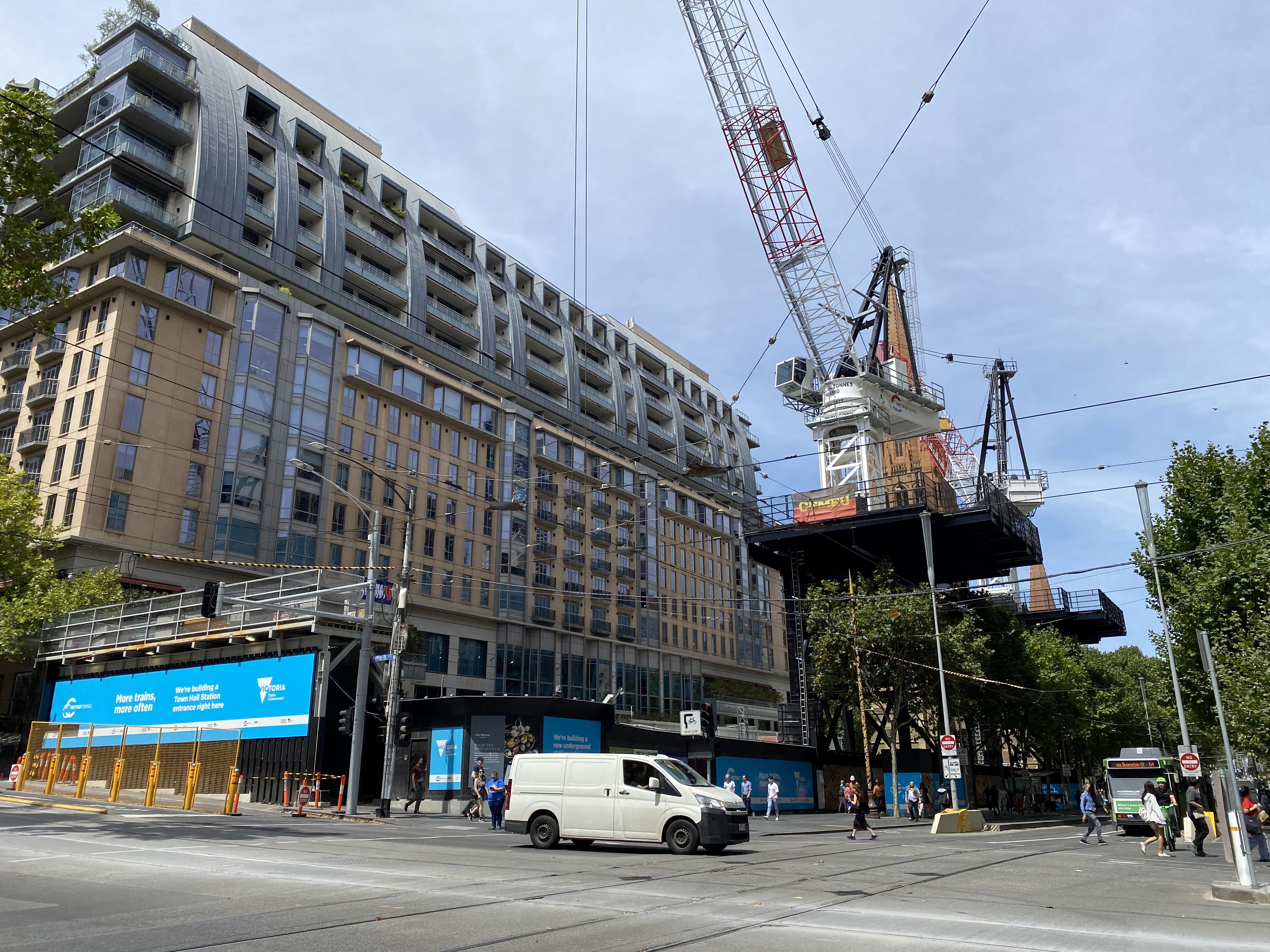
Town Hall railway station construction site in 2023, a CFMEU banner can be seen

The allegations placed pressure on Allan, who had served as Minister for Transport and Infrastructure under Daniel Andrews during the period when much of the alleged corruption occurred. Multiple government MPs, including ministers, privately called for Allan to establish a royal commission or inquiry, concerned that refusing to do so made the government appear guilty. Despite these concerns, Allan rejected calls for a royal commission, stating that "there has already been a royal commission that failed" and that the opposition's motivation was "to claw back members' wages". She dismissed internal concerns as "anonymous gossip".

The government's handling of the scandal led to tense exchanges. At a press conference in February 2026, Allan threatened to stop answering questions after a reporter suggested she looked "disinterested" in the matter, demanding the comment be retracted before proceeding. Police Minister Anthony Carbines launched personal attacks on Watson, describing his evidence as "florid ramblings" and calling him a "headline chaser". The Attorney-General and Minister for Planning, Sonya Kilkenny, also questioned Watson's credibility, stating that "the line between fact and allegation has now been blurred". Watson responded that it "seems that they want to attack me personally, challenge my integrity but they won't deal with the problem".

In February 2026, it was revealed that the Independent Broad-based Anti-corruption Commission (IBAC) had told Allan's office in 2024 that it did not have jurisdiction to investigate CFMEU matters. The Greens and opposition attempted to amend government legislation to give IBAC "follow-the-money" powers to trace public funds through major projects, prompting the government to delay a parliamentary vote. Allan resisted the push, stating the government had already taken "strong action" including referring matters to Victoria Police, which had laid 70 charges, and cancelling 126 construction licences. She described the proposed amendments as a "political stunt".

Later that month, Kilkenny was referred to a parliamentary privileges committee after admitting she had misspoken when claiming she had referred allegations from an Indigenous labour hire firm to police. Kilkenny acknowledged that she had instead spoken to a government relations adviser and had not followed up, stating that "in hindsight, we can always look at things and think things could have been done differently". Opposition Leader Jess Wilson accused Allan of a "failure of leadership" for not publicly addressing the allegations, noting that as the minister responsible for infrastructure during the Big Build, Allan had "overseen corruption that is costing every Victorian household more than $5,000."

On 28 June 2026, 60 Minutes broadcast a story, and the The Sunday Age also published a newspaper article, on the Big Build, with both the former Victorian ombudsman, Deborah Glass, and the former IBAC commissioner, Robert Redlich, calling for a royal commission to be held to inquire into corruption on the Big Build. On 30 June 2026, The Age newspaper published an article that senior Victoria Police detectives from Taskforce Hawk, established in June 2024 to investigate the construction sector, have said that "there is "no doubt" organised criminals have infiltrated" the Big Build and that they do not have the legislative power to investigate "grey corruption".

On 3 July 2026, The Age newspaper published an opinion piece written by Allan in which she said "There was violence, intimidation and organised criminal behaviour" on Build Big sites and that she was "deeply sorry that it happened on projects funded by the Victorian people".

=== Resignation ===
In late July 2026 the deputy premier, Ben Carroll, confirmed he would nominate for the leadership of the Victorian Labor Party in the event of a spill, following a cross-factional delegation of ministers and MPs who visited Allan to urge her to stand down. The delegation told Allan she had lost majority support within caucus. Allan responded by asking the ministers in the delegation to resign, a request they refused. Carroll subsequently met with the premier to inform her of his intention to run and later issued a public statement declaring that "the stakes at the upcoming election are simply too high" and warning of the risk of a Liberal–One Nation government. Earlier that morning, Allan wrote to the party's state secretary to indicate she would contest any leadership ballot. A ballot, if triggered, would involve a weeks-long process where both the parliamentary caucus and rank-and-file Labor members would vote, with the result determined by a 50–50 split between MPs and party members. On 28 July 2026, Allan announced her resignation as premier and leader of the Victorian Labor Party.

On 14 August 2026, Allan announced her resignation from Parliament at the next state election after weeks of speculation since resigning as premier.

== Political positions ==
Allan is a member of the Labor Party's Left faction.

=== Abortion ===
Allan supports abortion rights. During a 2008 parliamentary debate on the decriminalisation of abortion in Victoria, she revealed that she and her staff had been subjected to abusive emails, phone calls, and a picket of her electorate office by anti-abortion campaigners. In October 2024, Allan stated that conservative forces posed "real and genuine threats to the protections women have fought for and won", citing debates in South Australia and Queensland and the overturning of Roe v. Wade in the United States. She acknowledged that access to services remained a challenge for regional women. Her government established 20 sexual and reproductive health hubs across the state and expanded the authority of endorsed midwives to prescribe medical abortions.

=== Drugs ===
During a parliamentary debate Allan admitted to using cannabis recreationally. The debate addressed a private member's bill introduced by Legalise Cannabis to regulate adult use of cannabis. While the government did not support the bill, Allan stated it was "important that we object a sense of honesty into our contributions on this" and that the issue was best approached with a "harm-minimisation approach". She stressed that the government had no plans to decriminalise adult use of cannabis, but was open to discussing the topic with experts and the crossbench. Allan has stated she was previously not in favour of pill testing, but changed her position after meeting with parents of children affected by drugs. In April 2024, Allan's government scrapped plans for a second supervised injecting room in Melbourne, citing the inability to find a suitable location despite a report recommending the trial.

=== Israel–Palestine conflict ===
In February 2026, Allan received Israeli President Isaac Herzog in Melbourne. The visit drew criticism from advocacy groups, who noted that a September 2025 United Nations commission report had found Israel responsible for acts of genocide in Gaza and had specifically identified Herzog among Israeli officials who engaged in "direct and public incitement to commit genocide". Protests were held in Melbourne during his visit.

=== Parliamentary prayer ===
In January 2024, Allan indicated support for reviewing the tradition of reciting the Lord's Prayer at the start of each parliamentary sitting day, a practice dating back to 1918. Allan stated that Victoria's growing cultural diversity meant it was important to "look at reflecting that in our parliamentary practices", while noting that any change would be a matter for cross-party discussion rather than government decree. The comments followed two Labor MPs choosing to abstain from the prayer in protest at Pope Francis's remarks on surrogacy. Despite the government having committed to "workshopping a replacement model" if re-elected in 2022, by July 2024 the Attorney-General confirmed there was no active proposal to remove the prayer, following a petition and campaign by faith groups to retain it.

== Personal life ==
Allan is married to Yorick Piper, a former ministerial advisor and a former CFMEU official, with whom she has two children. She lives in Bendigo East with her family. In December 2025, Piper lost his driver licence and was fined after being caught drink driving.

== Electoral history ==
Electoral history of Jacinta Allan in the Parliament of Victoria
Year	Electorate	Party	First Preference Result				Two Candidate Result			
Year	Electorate	Party	Votes	%	+%	Position	Votes	%	+%	Result
1999	Bendigo East	Labor	15,478	48.4	+6.6	1st	16,977	53.1	+8.1	Elected
2002	Bendigo East	Labor	18,639	56.4	+8.0	1st	20,795	63.0	+10.1	Elected
2006	Bendigo East	Labor	16,038	46.88	−9.55	1st	19,008	55.35	−7.61	Elected
2010	Bendigo East	Labor	16,079	43.85	−3.03	1st	19,797	53.82	−1.53	Elected
2014	Bendigo East	Labor	18,651	46.3	+3.1	1st	22,187	55.0	+1.9	Elected
2018	Bendigo East	Labor	21,693	50.35	+4.07	1st	26,776	62.11	+7.12	Elected
2022	Bendigo East	Labor	22,010	48.3	−2.0	1st	27,727	60.8	−1.3	Elected

Victorian Legislative Assembly
Preceded by Michael John	Member for Bendigo East; 1999–present	Incumbent
Political offices
Preceded by Louise Asher as Minister for Employment and Trade	Minister for Employment; 2014–2016	Succeeded by Wade Noonan as Minister for Industry and Employment
Preceded by Terry Mulder	Minister for Public Transport; 2014–2018	Succeeded by Melissa Horne
New title	Minister for Transport Infrastructure; 2018–2023	Succeeded by Danny Pearson
Preceded by Gavin Jennings	Minister for Priority Precincts; 2020–2023	Succeeded by Colin Brooks
Preceded by James Merlino	Deputy Premier of Victoria; 2022–2023	Succeeded by Ben Carroll
Preceded by Daniel Andrews	Premier of Victoria; 2023–2026	Succeeded by Ben Carroll
Party political offices
Preceded by James Merlino	Deputy Leader of the Labor Party in Victoria; 2022–2023	Succeeded by Ben Carroll
Preceded by Daniel Andrews	Leader of the Labor Party in Victoria; 2023–2026	Succeeded by Gabrielle Williams; Interim
