= Adem Somyurek =

Australian politician

The Honourable Adem Somyurek MLC
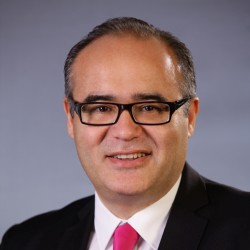
- Somyurek in 2015

Member of the Victorian Legislative Council
- Incumbent
- Assumed office 30 November 2002
- Constituency: Northern Metropolitan Region (2022–present); South-Eastern Metropolitan Region (2006–2022); Eumemmerring Province (2002–2006)

Minister for Local Government
- In office 29 November 2018 – 15 June 2020
- Premier: Daniel Andrews
- Preceded by: Marlene Kairouz
- Succeeded by: Danny Pearson

Minister for Small Business
- In office 29 November 2018 – 15 June 2020
- Premier: Daniel Andrews
- Preceded by: Philip Dalidakis

Minister for Small Business, Innovation and Trade
- In office 3 December 2014 – 27 July 2015
- Premier: Daniel Andrews
- Preceded by: Louise Asher
- Succeeded by: Philip Dalidakis

Personal details
- Born: Adem Kubilay Somyurek; 25 September 1967 (age 59) İzmir, Turkey
- Party: Independent (2020–2022, 2024–present)
- Other political affiliations: Labor (1996–2020); Democratic Labour (2022–2024)
- Education: Deakin University (MPol&Policy); Monash University (BA); Chisholm (CertBus(Acc)
- Profession: Politician
- Website: Personal Twitter Facebook

Adem Kubilay Somyurek (born 25 September 1967) is an Australian politician. He has served as a member of the Victorian Legislative Council currently representing the Northern Metropolitan Region.

Somyurek was a member of the Australian Labor Party (ALP) until 2020, when he resigned and subsequently served as an independent. He served twice as a government minister. He was Minister for Small Business, Innovation and Trade in the First Andrews Ministry from 2014 to 2015. He then served as Minister for Local Government and Minister for Small Business in the Second Andrews Ministry from 2018 to 2020.

In June 2020, Somyurek became the subject of major corruption allegations including branch stacking during the 48th Victorian Parliament.

== Personal life ==
Born in 1967 in İzmir, Turkey, Somyurek moved to Australia with his parents when he was 18 months old. Prior to entering the Victorian Parliament, Somyurek worked as a taxi driver, as a staffer for Labor Senator Jacinta Collins in 1996 and later in the office of federal MP Anthony Byrne.

Somyurek holds a Master of Arts in Policy and Politics, a Bachelor of Arts in Politics and Sociology and an Associate Diploma in Business Studies (Accounting).

== Political career ==
Somyurek first entered parliament after winning the Legislative Council province of Eumemmerring at the 2002 election. Somyurek made his inaugural speech to the Victorian Legislative Council as the new member for Eumemmerring on 27 February 2003. After the reforms that introduced proportional representation into the Legislative Council, Somyurek won a safe spot on the Labor ticket for the South Eastern Metropolitan Region and was easily re-elected at the 2006 election. Somyurek was elected in the 2010 and 2014 state elections.

In his first term (2002–2006) Somyurek served on the Outer Suburban and Interface Committee, and the Public Accounts and Estimates Committee. In his second term (2006–2010) Somyurek was elected the first chair of the newly constituted Electoral Matters Committee but lost the position in December 2009 as a result of being convicted for driving while disqualified.

In his third term (2010–2014) Somyurek was promoted into the Shadow Ministry of the Daniel Andrews-led Labor opposition. Upon election to his fourth term (2014–2018) and the election of the Labor Party in Victoria, Somyurek was sworn in as Minister for Small Business, Innovation, and Trade.

Somyurek stood down from his ministerial role in May 2015 following allegations from his chief of staff, Dimity Paul, of bullying, and later resigned on 28 July 2015 after an investigation by the Secretary of the Department of Premier and Cabinet made adverse findings against him. Somyurek disputed these claims.

At the 2018 Victorian election Somyurek was returned to his seat in the Upper House. On 27 November 2018 Premier Daniel Andrews announced that Somyurek would be rejoining the Cabinet in the new Andrews Ministry. On 29 November 2018 it was revealed that Somyurek was to handle the portfolios of Local Government and Small Business within the re-elected Andrews Government. When Local Government Minister, Somyurek legislated "single-member" wards on local councils to take full effect in municipal elections in 2024. Somyurek rose to the National Executive, the chief administrative authority of the ALP.

=== The Age/Nine recordings ===
On 14 June 2020, The Age and Nine Network published covert recordings purporting to show Somyurek organising branch stacking. In its investigation, Somyurek is alleged to have registered local party members with false details, taking funds from an ATM to pay for party membership fees, and directing his staff relating to party activities.

Included in the numerous covert recordings, are several sections where Somyurek is heard making derogatory comments towards MPs Gabrielle Williams and ministerial staffers.

"This is going to be relentless; we're just going to go fuck them. We're just going to go to town. This is fucking war. We've got fucking massive numbers, we've got about thirty going in every week..."

—, Covert audio recording of Somyurek

Following the release of the recordings, on 15 June 2020, Premier Andrews sacked Somyurek from his cabinet and referred Somyurek's conduct to Victoria Police and the Independent Broad-based Anti-corruption Commission for further investigation. Andrews also wrote to the ALP National Executive to seek the termination of Somyurek's party membership. Later that day, the Labor Party's national president, Wayne Swan, confirmed that Somyurek had resigned his membership before he was to be expelled.

=== IBAC investigation ===
Somyurek was a target of Operation Watts, an investigation by Victoria's Independent Broad-based Anti-corruption Commission (IBAC) and the Victorian Ombudsman. Operation Watts examined allegations of "serious corrupt conduct" made against Victorian public officers and Members of Parliament, and examined the 'branch stacking' aired in media reports in 2020. Public hearings were held in October and November 2021.

On the first day of hearing on 11 October 2021, federal Labor MP and former ally of Somyurek Anthony Byrne claimed that Somyurek "had been coercing staff for at least two years and had threatened to 'take people out' of pre-selections."

The findings of the investigation were released in July 2022. The report found that Somyurek had misused publicly funded staff, including by engaging them in branch stacking. The report recommended making it "unlawful for ministers to allow a person to perform party political work while employed in a publicly funded role," which was not the case at the time of the allegations made against Somyurek.

=== Re-election ===
In November 2022, Somyurek announced he had joined the Democratic Labour Party, and ran as a candidate for that party in the Northern Metropolitan Region for the Legislative Council. Somyurek subsequently won a seat, defeating MP Fiona Patten.

Somyurek left the Democratic Labour Party in 2024.

Victorian Legislative Council
Preceded by Fiona Patten	Member for Northern Metropolitan Region; 2022–present	Incumbent
Region created	Member for South Eastern Metropolitan Region; 2006–2022	Succeeded by Rachel Payne
Preceded by Neil Lucas	Member for Eumemmerring Province; 2002–2006	Province abolished
Political offices
Preceded by Louise Asher as Minister for Innovation and Trade	Minister for Small Business, Innovation and Trade; 2014–2015	Succeeded by Philip Dalidakis
Preceded by Marlene Kairouz	Minister for Local Government; 2018–2020	Succeeded by Danny Pearson
Preceded by Philip Dalidakis	Minister for Small Business; 2018–2020	Succeeded by Danny Pearson
