= Jaala Pulford =

Australian politician (born 1974)

The Honourable Jaala Pulford MLC
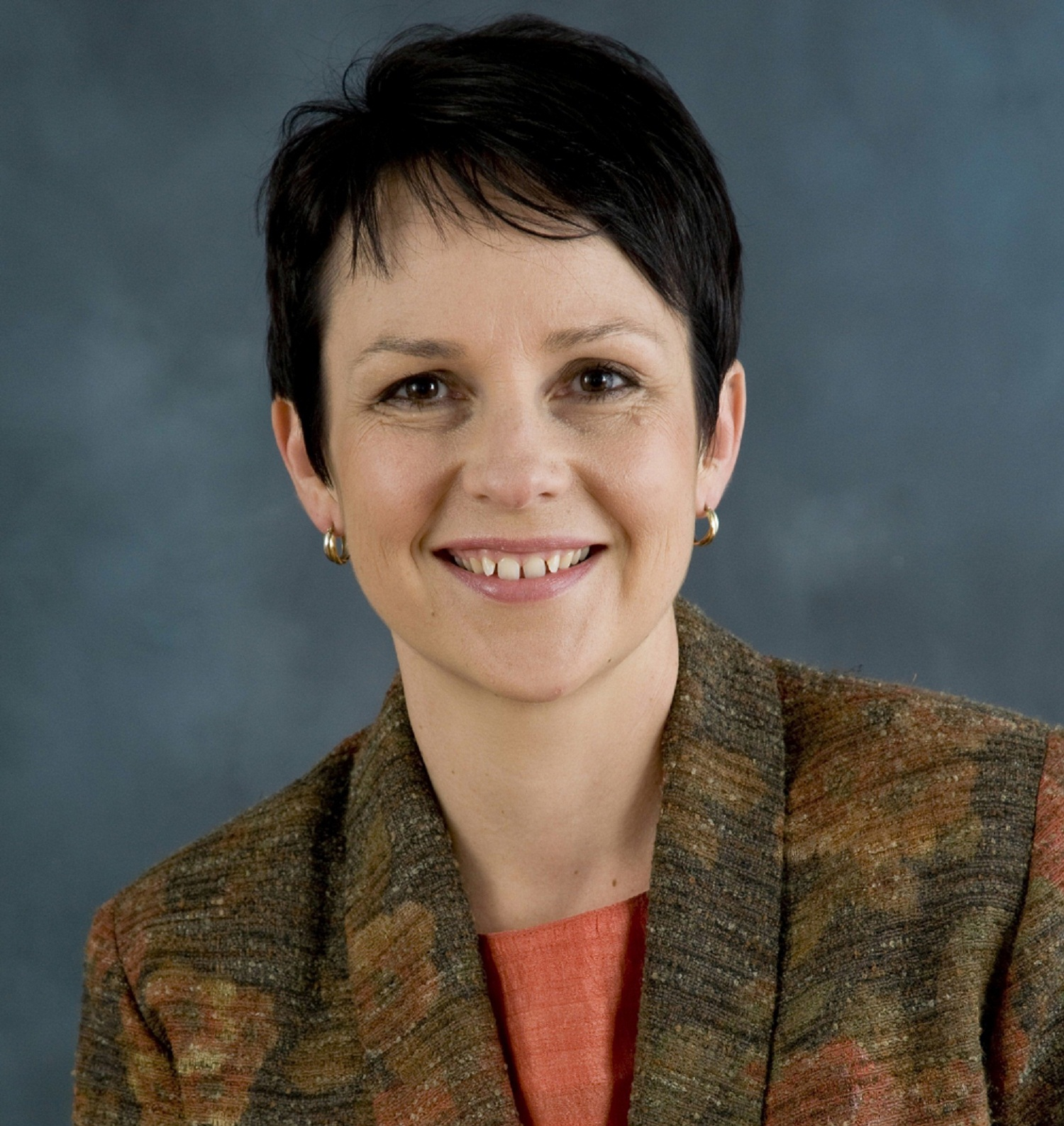
- Pulford in 2022

Minister for Resources
- In office 23 August 2021 – December 2022
- Preceded by: Jaclyn Symes
- Succeeded by: Lily D'Ambrosio (Note: As Minister for Energy and Resources.)

Minister for Employment
- In office 22 June 2020 – December 2022
- Preceded by: Portfolio created
- Succeeded by: Ben Carroll

Minister for Innovation, Medical Research and the Digital Economy
- In office 22 June 2020 – December 2022
- Preceded by: Portfolio created
- Succeeded by: Martin Pakula (Note: As Minister for Innovation.); Mary-Anne Thomas (Note: As Minister for Medical Research.)

Minister for Small Business
- In office 22 June 2020 – December 2022
- Preceded by: Adem Somyurek
- Succeeded by: Natalie Suleyman (Note: As Minister for Small Business and Employment.)

Minister for Roads
- In office 30 November 2018 – 22 June 2020
- Preceded by: Luke Donnellan
- Succeeded by: Ben Carroll

Minister for Agriculture
- In office 4 December 2014 – 30 November 2018
- Preceded by: Peter Walsh
- Succeeded by: Jaclyn Symes

Minister for Regional Development
- In office 4 December 2014 – 30 November 2018
- Preceded by: Peter Ryan
- Succeeded by: Jaclyn Symes

Deputy Leader of the Government in the Legislative Council
- In office 4 December 2014 – 30 November 2018
- Preceded by: Wendy Lovell
- Succeeded by: Jaclyn Symes

Member of the Victorian Legislative Council
- In office 25 November 2006 – 26 November 2022
- Constituency: Western Victoria Region

Personal details
- Born: 14 February 1974 (age 52) Melbourne, Victoria, Australia
- Party: Labor Party
- Education: Deakin University
- Website: www.jaalapulford.com.au

Jaala Pulford (born 14 February 1974) is a former Australian politician. She was a Labor Party member of the Victorian Legislative Council between 2006 and 2022, representing the Western Victoria Region.

Pulford was Minister for Agriculture, Minister for Regional Development and Deputy Leader of the Government in the Legislative Council between 4 December 2014 and 30 November 2018 following the election of the Andrews Labor Government. She was appointed Minister for Roads, Road Safety and the TAC, and Fishing and Boating on 30 November 2018. In June 2020, Pulford was appointed Minister for Small Business; Minister for Employment; and Minister for Innovation, Medical Research and the Digital Economy and in August 2021, she was additionally appointed Minister for Resources.

== Early life ==
Pulford grew up in Castlemaine and attended Bendigo Senior Secondary College. She worked as an Organiser for the National Union of Workers Victorian Branch between 1994 and 2006.

Pulford has a Bachelor of Applied Management from University of Ballarat and has since completed a Masters of Public Policy at Deakin University.

== Political career ==
Pulford has held a number of roles within the ALP, including State and National Conference delegate, Junior Vice-president of the Victorian Branch, National Labor Women's Network secretary, and President of the ALP Women's Policy Committee.

In November 2006, she was elected, at the age of 32, as a member of the Victorian Legislative Council, representing the Western Victoria Region. As a member of the Brumby Government, she served as Parliamentary Secretary for Industrial Relations (August 2007 – January 2010) and Parliamentary Secretary for Regional and Rural Development, Industry and Trade (January – November 2010).

Following the Labor government's loss at the 2010 state election, Pulford was appointed Shadow Parliamentary Secretary to the Leader of the Opposition (Legislative Council) and Shadow Parliamentary Secretary for Regional and Rural Development.

On 4 December 2014, Pulford was appointed Minister for Agriculture, Minister for Regional Development and Deputy Leader of the Government in the Legislative Council as part of the Labor Government led by Daniel Andrews. She was Victoria's first female Agriculture Minister, and oversaw significant reform, including the establishment of Regional Partnerships and a medicinal cannabis industry, the mandatory electronic tagging of sheep, Victoria's first digital agriculture program, greater animal welfare protection, and attracting recreational fishers to Victoria.

On 30 November 2018, Pulford was appointed Minister for Roads, Road Safety and the TAC, and Fishing and Boating in the re-elected Andrews Government.

On 22 June 2020, Pulford was appointed Minister for Small Business; Minister for Employment; and Minister for Innovation, Medical Research and the Digital Economy.

On 23 August 2021, Pulford was appointed Minister for Resources.

On 28 October 2022, Pulford announced she would not recontest her seat at the 2022 State election.

== Personal life ==
Pulford is married with a son and lives in Ballarat. Her daughter Sinead died of cancer in 2014, aged 13.

== Notes ==
Political offices
Preceded by Peter Walsh as Minister for Agriculture and Food Security	Minister for Agriculture; 2014–2018	Succeeded by Jaclyn Symes
Preceded by Peter Ryan as Minister for Rural and Regional Development	Minister for Regional Development; 2014–2018	Succeeded by Jaclyn Symes
Preceded by Luke Donnellan	Minister for Roads, Road Safety and the TAC; 2018–2020	Succeeded by Ben Carroll as Minister for Roads and Road Safety
Ministry created	Minister for Fishing and Boating; 2018–2020	Succeeded by Melissa Horne
Ministry created	Minister for Employment; 2020–2022	Succeeded by TBD
Ministry created	Minister for Innovation, Medical Research and the Digital Economy; 2020–2022	Succeeded by TBD
Preceded by Adem Somyurek	Minister for Small Business; 2020–2022	Succeeded by TBD
Preceded by Jaclyn Symes	Minister for Resources; 2021–2022	Succeeded by TBD
