= 2023 Victorian Labor Party leadership election =

Australian political party election

- 27 September 2023
- Leadership election
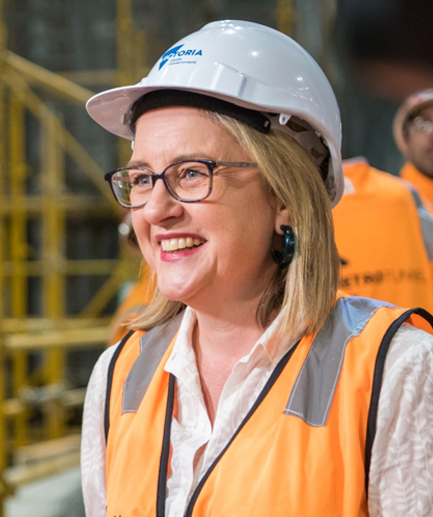
Candidate	Jacinta Allan
Caucus vote	Unopposed
Seat	Bendigo East
Faction	Left
Leader before election
Daniel Andrews
Elected Leader
Jacinta Allan
- Deputy leadership election
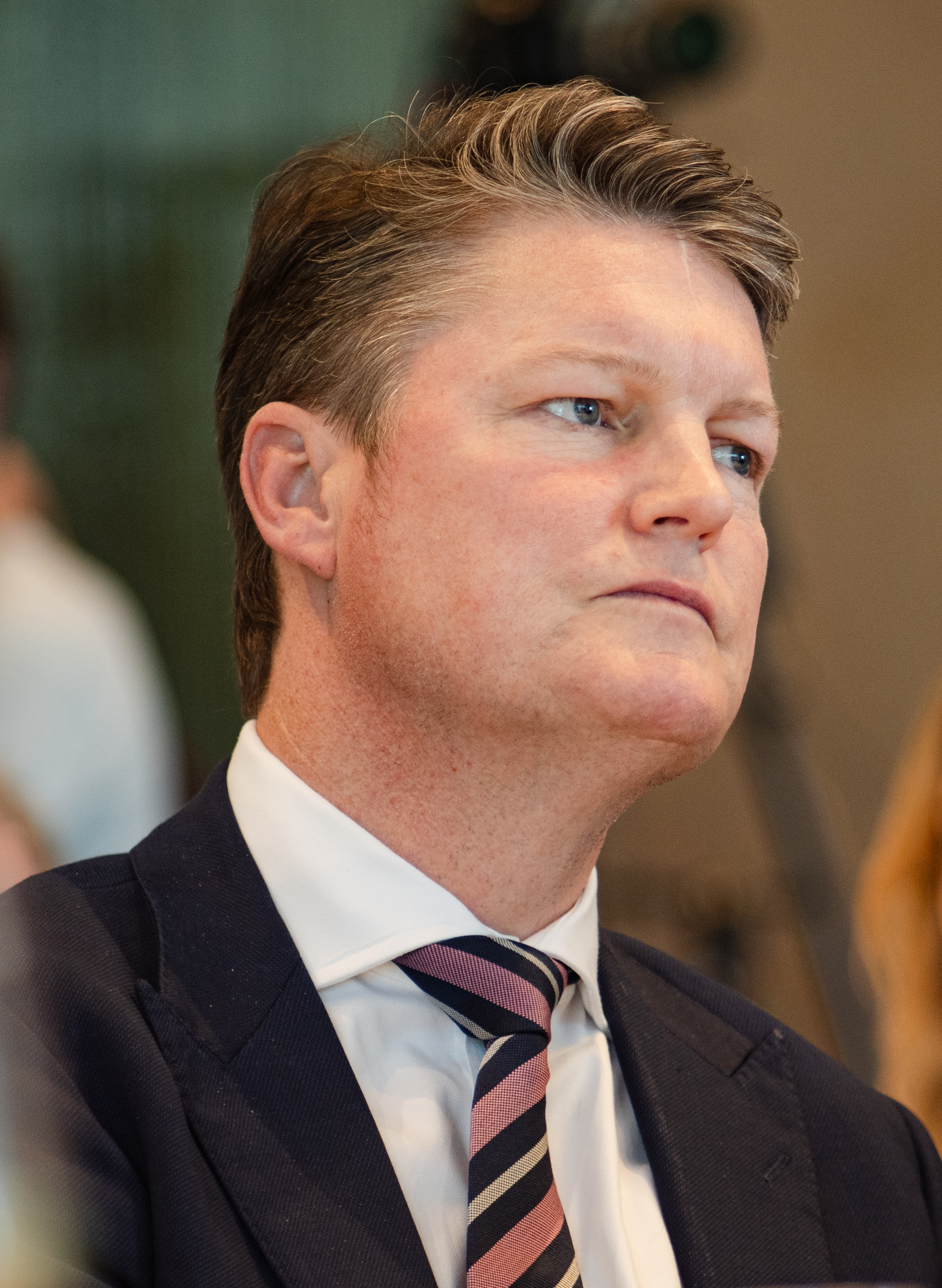
Candidate	Ben Carroll
Caucus vote	Unopposed
Seat	Niddrie
Faction	Right
Deputy Leader before election
Jacinta Allan
Elected Deputy Leader
Ben Carroll

The 2023 Victorian Labor Party leadership election was held on 27 September 2023 to elect a new leader of the Victorian Labor Party, who would also become the Premier of Victoria. Incumbent leader since 2010 and premier since 2014, Daniel Andrews, announced his intention to resign on 26 September. Jacinta Allan, Andrews' deputy, was elected unopposed as leader, being sworn in as premier at 5pm on 27 September. A brief challenge from Ben Carroll for the leadership position was withdrawn, and Carroll was ultimately acclaimed as Allan's deputy.

== Background ==
Daniel Andrews, who had served as Premier of Victoria since the 2014 Victorian state election and leader of the Victorian Labor Party since 2010, announced his resignation on 26 September 2023. Andrews stated he would step down both as premier and as member of the Legislative Assembly for Mulgrave effective 5pm on 27 September. He additionally stated that he would not vote in the election of the next leader of the Labor Party. While Andrews had previously promised to serve a full third term as premier after winning the 2022 election, he stated upon his resignation that he had decided otherwise since, and that the role of premier had taken its toll.

His resignation came after the release of a housing statement from the Victorian Government, which Andrews labeled his "last big reform". Andrews' premiership was noted for investments in infrastructure and public transport projects, such as the Level Crossing Removal Project and the Metro Tunnel. His tenure was also remembered for his handling of the COVID-19 pandemic, during which the state capital of Melbourne was placed under one of the world's longest lockdowns.

== Candidates ==
=== Leader ===
==== Declared ====
- Jacinta Allan, deputy premier since 2022, MP for Bendigo East since 1999

==== Withdrew ====
- Ben Carroll, public transport minister since 2020, MP for Niddrie since 2012

=== Deputy leader ===
==== Declared ====
- Ben Carroll, public transport minister since 2020, MP for Niddrie since 2012

==== Withdrew ====
- Tim Pallas, treasurer since 2014, MP (Note: Pallas has represented both the Tarneit and Werribee districts in his time in the Legislative Assembly.) since 2006
- Anthony Carbines, police minister since 2022

==== Speculated ====
The following members were speculated as potential candidates by media sources but did not contest for any position.

- Mary-Anne Thomas, health minister since 2022
- Gabrielle Williams, mental health minister since 2022

== Results ==
Following the resignation of Daniel Andrews on the afternoon of 26 September 2023, a meeting of the Labor caucus was scheduled for midday on 27 September. Jacinta Allan, of the Left faction, was expected to be anointed as Andrews' successor. However, it was reported on the day of the meeting that Ben Carroll intended to challenge Allan for the leadership, as the candidate of the Right faction. Both Allan and Carroll initially nominated for leader when the caucus meeting began. As negotiations continued between the Left and Right factions, Labor MPs could be heard singing the club song of the Brisbane Lions, which is set to the tune of La Marseillaise. Andrews spoke at the meeting at 1:13pm, saying to Labor MPs that he did not want the party to become like the Victorian Liberals, and asking Carroll to address the party room and say what he ought to. When Carroll began to explain the reasons behind his leadership bid, Andrews again insisted that Carroll needed to say what he ought to. In response, Carroll announced that he supported Allan, and would withdraw his nomination for leader of Victorian Labor. The party room meeting ultimately elected Allan as leader and Carroll as her deputy, both unopposed. Allan was sworn in as Victorian premier at 5pm later that day.

== See also ==
- 2023 Mulgrave state by-election
- 2023 Western Australian Labor Party leadership election (June 2023)
- 2023 Queensland Labor Party leadership election (December 2023)
- 2023 Territory Labor Party leadership election (December 2023)
