= Ben Carroll =

Premier of Victoria since 2026

The Honourable Ben Carroll MP
- Carroll in 2026

50th Premier of Victoria
- Incumbent
- Assumed office 28 July 2026
- Monarch: Charles III
- Governor: Margaret Gardner
- Deputy: Gabrielle Williams
- Preceded by: Jacinta Allan

Leader of the Victorian Labor Party
- Incumbent
- Assumed office 28 July 2026
- Deputy: Gabrielle Williams
- Preceded by: Jacinta Allan
Other offices held
30th Deputy Premier of Victoria
In office 27 September 2023 – 28 July 2026
Premier	Jacinta Allan
Preceded by	Jacinta Allan
Succeeded by	Gabrielle Williams
19th Deputy Leader of the Victorian Labor Party
In office 27 September 2023 – 28 July 2026
Leader	Jacinta Allan
Preceded by	Jacinta Allan
Succeeded by	Gabrielle Williams
Minister for Education
In office 2 October 2023 – 4 August 2026
Premier	Jacinta Allan
Preceded by	Natalie Hutchins
Succeeded by	Gabrielle Williams
Minister for Medical Research
In office 15 April 2026 – 4 August 2026
Premier	Jacinta Allan
Preceded by	Position established
Succeeded by	Anthony Carbines
Minister for WorkSafe and the TAC
In office 19 December 2024 – 4 August 2026
Premier	Jacinta Allan
Preceded by	Danny Pearson
Succeeded by	Steve Dimopoulos
Minister for Public Transport
In office 22 June 2020 – 2 October 2023
Premier	Daniel Andrews; Jacinta Allan
Preceded by	Melissa Horne
Succeeded by	Gabrielle Williams (as Minister for Public and Active Transport)
Minister for Industry and Innovation
In office 5 December 2022 – 2 October 2023
Premier	Daniel Andrews; Jacinta Allan
Preceded by	Martin Pakula (as Minister for Jobs, Innovation and Trade)
Succeeded by	Natalie Hutchins (as Minister for Jobs and Industry)
Minister for Manufacturing Sovereignty
In office 5 December 2022 – 2 October 2023
Premier	Daniel Andrews; Jacinta Allan
Preceded by	Position established
Succeeded by	Position abolished
Minister for Employment
In office 5 December 2022 – 2 October 2023
Premier	Daniel Andrews; Jacinta Allan
Preceded by	Jaala Pulford
Succeeded by	Vicki Ward
Minister for Roads and Road Safety
In office 22 June 2020 – 5 December 2022
Premier	Daniel Andrews
Preceded by	Jaala Pulford
Succeeded by	Melissa Horne
Minister for Corrections, Youth Justice and Crime Prevention
In office 29 November 2018 – 22 June 2020
Premier	Daniel Andrews
Preceded by	Gayle Tierney
Succeeded by	Natalie Hutchins
Minister for Victim Support
In office 29 November 2018 – 22 June 2020
Premier	Daniel Andrews
Preceded by	Position established
Succeeded by	Natalie Hutchins
Minister for Industry and Employment
In office 16 October 2017 – 29 November 2018
Premier	Daniel Andrews
Preceded by	Wade Noonan
Succeeded by	Position abolished

Member of the Victorian Legislative Assembly for Niddrie
- Incumbent
- Assumed office 24 March 2012
- Preceded by: Rob Hulls

Personal details
- Born: Benjamin Alan Carroll; 12 July 1975 (age 51) Melbourne, Victoria, Australia
- Party: Labor
- Spouse: Fiona Rothville (m. 2015)
- Children: 1
- Education: La Trobe University (LL.M.)
- Website: bencarroll.com.au

Benjamin Alan Carroll (born 12 July 1975) is an Australian politician and lawyer who has served as the 50th premier of Victoria and leader of the Victorian Labor Party since July 2026. He has been the member of the Legislative Assembly (MP) for the district of Niddrie since 2012.

Carroll was born in Melbourne, attending St. Bernard's College and studying law at La Trobe University, where he joined the Labor Party. Prior to entering politics, he worked in vehicle insurance and was later admitted as a solicitor. He was as a political adviser to premier Steve Bracks from 2000 to 2004. Carroll was elected to the Legislative Assembly for the district of Niddrie in the 2012 by-election, after the resignation of Rob Hulls.

He joined the first Andrews ministry as Parliamentary Secretary for Justice in 2014, and was appointed to the cabinet in 2017, serving as Minister for Industry and Employment. During the second and third Andrews ministry, he held a range of cabinet portfolios that spanned infrastructure, industry and justice. Carroll was appointed as the deputy premier of Victoria in 2023, following the resignation of premier Daniel Andrews. He also served as Minister for Education, Minister for Medical Research and Minister for WorkSafe and the TAC in the Allan ministry, where he faced large disputes over public school funding and teacher salaries.

Carroll became the premier of Victoria and leader of the Victorian Labor Party on 28 July 2026, after Jacinta Allan's resignation. Upon taking office, he has announced a royal commission into the construction sector, a cabinet review of the Suburban Rail Loop project and new worker protection laws.

== Early years and education ==
Benjamin Alan Carroll was born on 12 July 1975 in Melbourne, Victoria and raised in the suburb of Airport West. His father was an electrician, and his mother worked as a business manager at Glenroy West Primary School. Carroll attended St Christopher's Primary School and completed his secondary education at St Bernard's College in Essendon. From his teenage years into his early twenties, he worked as a sales assistant at Kmart in Airport West, where he first became involved with the Shop, Distributive and Allied Employees Association.

Carroll studied law at La Trobe University, graduating with honours in 2000. He joined the Labor Party while at university and was admitted as a solicitor in 2010. He later earned a Master of Laws from La Trobe University, completing the degree following his election to parliament in 2012.

Prior to entering politics, Carroll worked in the motor vehicles division of insurance firm AAMI, and was admitted as a lawyer in April 2010 after completing a legal traineeship at the Victorian Government Solicitor's Office between 2009 and 2010.

== Political career ==
Carroll worked as a political adviser to former Victorian premier Steve Bracks from 2000 to 2004.

In March 2012, Carroll was elected to the Victorian Legislative Assembly for the seat of Niddrie in a by-election triggered by the resignation of former deputy premier Rob Hulls. He was subsequently re-elected at the 2014, 2018, and 2022 state elections.

In December 2014, Carroll was appointed as Parliamentary Secretary for Justice in the first Andrews ministry. In October 2017, he entered the cabinet as Minister for Industry and Employment following the resignation of Wade Noonan. In the second Andrews ministry, he served as Minister for Victim Support and Minister for Corrections, Youth Justice and Crime Prevention from 2018 to 2020, then as Minister for Roads and Road Safety from 2020 to 2022 and Minister for Public Transport from 2020 to 2023. In the third Andrews ministry, he briefly held the portfolios of Minister for Industry and Innovation, Minister for Manufacturing Sovereignty and Minister for Employment from 2022 to 2023.

In 2022, Carroll as Minister for Roads announced plans for the Aboriginal flag to permanently fly atop Melbourne's West Gate Bridge alongside the Australian flag. The Victorian Liberal Opposition Leader Matthew Guy supported the plans. Since July 2022, the flag has flown over the bridge.

In September 2023, Carroll was elected as the deputy leader of the Victorian Labor Party and the deputy premier of Victoria following the resignation of Daniel Andrews and the ascension of Jacinta Allan to the premiership. He has also served as Minister for Medical Research since April 2026 and Minister for WorkSafe and the TAC since 2024, in the Allan ministry.

=== Minister for Education ===
Upon becoming Deputy Premier in October 2023, Carroll assumed the role of Minister for Education. His tenure has been marked by significant industrial disputes with the Australian Education Union (AEU) Victorian Branch regarding public school funding, teacher salaries, and classroom workloads. In March 2026, thousands of Victorian public school teachers, principals, and education support staff participated in a 24-hour statewide strike—the first such action in Victoria in over 13 years—marching to the State Parliament to demand improved compensation and working conditions.

Following months of negotiations, the government presented a revised $6 billion agreement offering a 28.2 percent pay increase over four years, which Carroll described as a landmark offer while urging the union to cease industrial action. In July 2026, AEU members narrowly rejected the offer, with 51.18 percent voting against the deal. Despite Carroll appealing to educators that "students should be in classrooms and parents shouldn't be left scrambling for childcare or losing a day's pay", a second 24-hour statewide stop-work stoppage and rally proceeded on 23 July 2026. In addition to the statewide walkouts, rank-and-file teachers and union splinter groups staged targeted demonstrations outside Carroll's electorate office in Niddrie.

=== Premier of Victoria ===
In late July 2026, Carroll confirmed he would nominate for the leadership of the Victorian Labor Party in the event of a spill, after a cross-factional delegation of ministers and MPs visited Premier Jacinta Allan to urge her to stand down. The delegation told Allan she had lost majority support within caucus, then met with Carroll and urged him to step forward as a contender. Allan responded by asking the ministers in the delegation to resign, a request they refused. Carroll subsequently met with the premier to inform her of his intention to run, and later issued a public statement declaring that "the stakes at the upcoming election are simply too high" and warning of the risk of a Liberal-One Nation government. Earlier that morning, Allan wrote to the party's state secretary to indicate she would contest any leadership ballot. That ballot, if triggered, would involve a weeks-long process where both the parliamentary caucus and rank-and-file Labor members would vote, with the result determined by a 50-50 split between MPs and party members. The move to challenge Allan came after factional conveners from Labor's left and right met days earlier and agreed she no longer had the support of a majority of the caucus, just four months before the state election.

On 28 July 2026, Allan resigned as premier, stating that while she believed she would have won a leadership ballot, stepping aside was "the right thing" to do for Labor and Victorians with the election just four months away. Allan announced her resignation ahead of the caucus meeting and expressed that should Carroll emerge as the next leader, he would have her congratulations and "unqualified support". During the subsequent caucus meeting, Carroll faced a surprise leadership challenge from Planning Minister Sonya Kilkenny, who earned the support of 15 MPs including Allan herself, but Carroll secured the support of more than two-thirds of caucus and was declared unanimously elected. Carroll was officially sworn in as Victoria's 50th premier on the same day.

== Political views ==
Carroll is a member of the Labor Right faction, and was associated with the Shop, Distributive and Allied Employees Association (SDA) union in his early career. He is a member of former federal Senator's Stephen Conroy's faction known as the "Cons", with Carroll considering Conroy a political mentor.

=== Economics ===
He has been characterised as more economically liberal and pro-business in comparison to his Labor Left predecessors Jacinta Allan and Daniel Andrews, and has cited former US President Bill Clinton as an inspiration.

=== Foreign policy ===
He was the only sitting Labor MP to publicly criticise Andrews after he attended China's 2025 Victory Day Parade.

== Personal life ==
Carroll and his wife Fiona have a daughter. He is a supporter of the North Melbourne Football Club.

== Electoral history ==
Electoral history of Ben Carroll in the Parliament of Victoria
Year	Electorate	Party	First Preference Result				Two Candidate Result			
Year	Electorate	Party	Votes	%	+%	Position	Votes	%	+%	Result
2012	Niddrie	Labor	12,941	46.8	+1.1	1st	18,565	67.2	+10.2	Elected
2014	Niddrie	Labor	17,342	46.2	+2.8	1st	21,686	57.7	+3.2	Elected
2018	Niddrie	Labor	21,042	54.79	+8.64	1st	24,021	62.59	+4.88	Elected
2022	Niddrie	Labor	18,567	43.9	−10.9	1st	23,949	56.7	−5.8	Elected

Victorian Legislative Assembly
Preceded by Rob Hulls	Member for Niddrie; 2012–present	Incumbent
Political offices
Preceded by Wade Noonan	Minister for Industry and Employment; 2017–2018	Ministry abolished
Preceded by Gayle Tierney	Minister for Corrections, Youth Justice and Crime Prevention; 2018–2020	Succeeded by Natalie Hutchins
Ministry created	Minister for Victim Support; 2018–2020	Succeeded by Natalie Hutchins
Preceded by Jaala Pulford	Minister for Roads and Road Safety; 2020–2023	Succeeded by Melissa Horne
Preceded by Melissa Horne	Minister for Public Transport; 2020–2023	Succeeded by Gabrielle Williams
Preceded by Jacinta Allan	Deputy Premier of Victoria; 2023–2026	Succeeded by Gabrielle Williams
Preceded by Mary-Anne Thomas	Minister for Medical Research; 2023–present	Incumbent
Preceded by Natalie Hutchins	Minister for Education; 2023–present	Incumbent
Preceded by Jacinta Allan	Premier of Victoria; 2026–present	Incumbent
Party political offices
Preceded by Jacinta Allan	Deputy Leader of the Victorian Labor Party; 2023–2026	Succeeded by Gabrielle Williams
Preceded by Jacinta Allan	Leader of the Victorian Labor Party; 2026–present	Incumbent
