= Phil Gude =

Australian politician

Phillip Archibald Gude (born 2 June 1941) is a former Victorian politician. From 1991 to 1999 he was deputy leader of the Victorian Liberal Party.

== Business career ==
Gude was born in Geelong to Archibald Gilby, small business owner, and Mavis Murfett. His education was at Geelong High School and the Gordon Institute of TAFE.

His business career commenced in 1960 with the Shell Oil Company as a trainee 1960–53, and proceeded to Blakistons Ltd as an accountant 1963–64, and the Ford Motor Company as an industrial relations officer 1964–67. He was executive director of the Bread Manufactures Association Victoria, the Master Pastrycooks Association Victoria and the Geelong Chamber of Commerce 1974–1976.

== Politics ==
Gude was elected to the Victorian Legislative Assembly as Member for Geelong East in March 1976. He was defeated at the next election in March 1979.

He returned to business life, becoming assistant director of the Victorian Chamber of Manufactures 1979–1981, and executive director of the Melbourne Chamber of Commerce 1982–85.

In April 1985 he was returned to parliament, as the Member for Hawthorn.

He held various shadow ministries in opposition and in 1991 he was elected deputy Liberal leader when Kennett made his leadership comeback.

On the election of the Kennett government in 1992 he held ministerial portfolios such as Industry and Employment (1992–96) and Education (1996–99).

On 12 October 1995 he spoke under privilege in parliament about Julia Gillard's connection to the AWU affair. Gude alleged that Gillard's Senate candidature "may not be the only reason she is no longer working for Slater & Gordon" and that she may have indirectly received a financial benefit through the association, and may therefore have been a recipient of fraudulently obtained funds. In particular, it was alleged that part of her home renovations were paid for out of the fund without Gillard's knowledge, although Gillard has repeatedly denied that this occurred, and no evidence that disproves her account has been produced. Julia Gillard became Prime Minister of Australia in June 2010. The matter referred to by Phil Gude in 1995 was revived in the context of a re-examination of the issues in 2012.

Gude retired before the 1999 election.

== Ministerial portfolios ==
- 1990–92: Shadow Minister for Youth Affairs, Shadow Minister for Consumer Affairs and Shadow Minister for Employment and Industrial Relations
- 1992 (Oct–Nov): Minister for Small Business, Minister for Youth Affairs and Minister for Industry Services
- 1992–96: Minister for Industry and Employment
- 1995–96: Minister for Regional Development
- 1996–99: Minister for Education

== Personal ==
On 28 November 1964 Gude married Carole Lorraine Hosking; they have two sons.
