= Minister for Commonwealth Games Delivery (Victoria) =

- Victorian coat of arms

- Flag of Victoria
- Style: The Honourable (formal); Minister (spoken)
- Member of: Parliament; Executive council
- Reports to: Premier
- Seat: Melbourne
- Nominator: Premier
- Appointer: Governor on the recommendation of the Premier
- Term length: At the governor's pleasure
- Formation: 12 February 2002
- First holder: Justin Madden
- Final holder: Jacinta Allan
- Abolished: 20 July 2023
- Salary: $395,738 (AUD)
- Website: https://m.vic.gov.au/contactsandservices/directory/?ea0_lfz149_120.&roleWithSubordinates&173b6f8d-41be-4b06-941b-aff6894cd9a6

The Minister for Commonwealth Games Delivery was the minister responsible for the organisation, implementation, and the delivery of the 2006 Commonwealth Games and later the 2026 Commonwealth Games for the Victorian Government. The individual who holds this office directed the government's approach to delivering the 2006 Commonwealth Games and the now canceled 2026 Commonwealth Games through the organising committee, Commonwealth Games Australia, and other government agencies. Since the introduction of the Ministry by the Andrews government in June 2022, the position has been held by Jacinta Allan.

Since the announcement of the 2026 games' cancelation, Dan Andrews withdrew the position from his ministry.

== Purpose ==
The ministerial position was formed in February 2002 after the successful bid by the Victorian Government to host the 2006 Commonwealth Games.

The ministerial position was reformed in June 2022 after the successful bid by the Victorian Government to host the 2026 Commonwealth Games. The position was formed to "lead the delivery of the Commonwealth Games in regional Victoria, and to manage venues, services, logistics, partnerships, media, broadcasting, and communications."

== List of ministers for Commonwealth Games delivery ==
Order	Minister	Party affiliation	Ministerial title	Term start	Term end	Time in office	Notes
1	Justin Madden	Labor	Minister for Commonwealth Games	12 February 2002	1 December 2006	4 years, 292 days	
2	Jacinta Allan	Labor	Minister for Commonwealth Games Delivery	24 June 2022	20 July 2023	1 year, 26 days	
