= Minister for Ports and Freight =

Australian state ministry portfolio in Victoria

Minister for Ports and Freight of Victoria
- Victorian coat of arms

- Flag of Victoria
- Incumbent; Melissa Horne MP since 29 November 2018
- Department of Transport and Planning
- Style: The Honourable
- Member of: Parliament; Executive council
- Reports to: Premier
- Nominator: Premier
- Appointer: Governor on the recommendation of the premier
- Term length: At the governor's pleasure
- Inaugural holder: Bill Baxter MLC
- Formation: 6 October 1992

The Minister for Ports and Freight is a ministry portfolio within the Executive Council of Victoria.

== Ministers ==
Order	MP	Party affiliation	Ministerial title	Term start	Term end	Time in office	Notes
1	Bill Baxter MLC	Nationals	Minister for Roads and Ports	6 October 1992	3 April 1996	3 years, 180 days	
2	Geoff Craige MLC	Liberal	Minister for Roads and Ports	3 April 1996	20 October 1999	3 years, 200 days	
3	Candy Broad MLC	Labor	Minister for Ports	20 October 1999	5 December 2002	3 years, 46 days	
4	Tim Pallas MP	Labor	Minister for Roads and Ports	1 December 2006	2 December 2010	13 years, 1 day	
5	Denis Napthine MP	Liberal	Minister for Ports	2 December 2010	13 March 2013	2 years, 101 days	
6	David Hodgett MP	Liberal	Minister for Ports	13 March 2013	4 December 2014	1 year, 266 days	
7	Luke Donnellan MP	Labor	Minister for Ports	4 December 2014	29 November 2018	3 years, 360 days	
8	Melissa Horne MP	Labor	Minister for Ports and Freight	29 November 2018	Incumbent	7 years, 282 days	
