= Louise Asher =

Australian politician

The Honourable Louise Asher AM
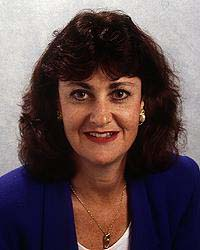

Minister for Tourism and Major Events Minister for Innovation, Services and Small Business
- In office 2 December 2010 – 29 November 2014
- Premier: Ted Baillieu (2010–2013); Denis Napthine (2013–2014)
- Preceded by: Tim Holding

Member of the Victorian Parliament for Brighton
- In office 18 September 1999 – 24 November 2018
- Preceded by: Alan Stockdale
- Succeeded by: James Newbury

Personal details
- Born: 26 June 1956 (age 70) Melbourne, Australia
- Party: Liberal Party
- Education: University of Melbourne; Monash University
- Profession: Teacher
- Website: Parliament web page Party web page

Louise Marjorie Asher AM (born 26 June 1956) is a retired Australian politician. She was a Liberal Party member of the Victorian Legislative Assembly from 1999 to 2018, representing the electorate of Brighton; she previously served in the Victorian Legislative Council from 1992 to 1999 as member for Monash Province. Asher was the second longest-serving Deputy Leader of the Victorian Liberal Party after Sir Arthur Rylah, and served from 1999 to 2002, and again from 2006 to 2014. She also served as a minister in the Kennett, Baillieu and Napthine governments.

== Early life ==
Asher joined the Young Liberal Movement in 1976 and served as state president in 1982. Asher also studied at both Melbourne and Monash University completing a Master of Arts and a Bachelor of Education and was a secondary teacher during the 1980s before becoming an advisor to New South Wales minister Peter Collins.

== Political career ==
At the 1992 state election Asher was elected to the Victorian Legislative Council as the member for Monash Province. After the 1996 election she served as Minister for Small Business and Minister for Tourism. An ally of Premier Jeff Kennett, Asher had the opportunity to transfer into the Legislative Assembly in her local district of Brighton after the retirement of Alan Stockdale. However she faced a bruising pre-selection against future Senator Mitch Fifield but she prevailed 33 votes to 18.

Louise Asher was involved in arrangements for the inaugural Melbourne Formula One race in 1996.

While Asher did enter the Legislative Assembly as the member for Brighton at the 1999 election the Liberal Party unexpectedly lost government. However Asher successfully contested the deputy leadership and also served as Shadow Treasurer. However, with the Liberals trailing badly in the polls in 2002 she and party leader Denis Napthine, who was also allied to Jeff Kennett, were replaced by Robert Doyle and Phil Honeywood as leader and deputy leader respectively. After the Liberals devastating defeat at the 2002 election continued to serve on the opposition frontbench, serving as Shadow minister for Manufacturing and Exports and later as Shadow Minister for Industry and Employment and Shadow Minister for Major Projects.

In March 2006 Honeywood announced his retirement from politics and resigned his position as Deputy Leader. In order to restore party unity and stabilise his own leadership, Doyle offered Asher the deputy leadership, which she accepted. However this move was not enough for Doyle to save his own leadership, and the following month he resigned and was replaced by Kennett supporter Ted Baillieu.

Asher was Minister for Tourism and Major Events as well as Minister for Innovation, Services and Small Business since 2 December 2010 in the Baillieu and Napthine Ministries. She resigned as deputy leader following the 2014 state election and was replaced by David Hodgett.

Asher married former National Party MLC Ron Best on 10 February 2001.

Asher retired from Parliament at the Victorian state election in 2018. She was appointed a Member of the Order of Australia (AM) in the 2022 Queen's Birthday Honours.

Victorian Legislative Council
Preceded by Reg Macey	Member for Monash Province; 1992–1999	Succeeded by Andrea Coote
Victorian Legislative Assembly
Preceded by Alan Stockdale	Member for Brighton; 1999–2018	Succeeded by James Newbury
Political offices
Preceded by Vin Heffernan	Minister for Small Business; 1996–1999	Succeeded by Marsha Thomson
Preceded by Pat McNamara	Minister for Tourism; 1996–1999	Succeeded by John Pandazopoulos
Preceded by Joe Helper as Minister for Small Business	Minister for Innovation, Services and Small Business; 2010–2014	Succeeded by Philip Dalidakis
Preceded by Gavin Jennings as Minister for Innovation	Minister for Innovation, Services and Small Business; 2010–2014	Succeeded by Philip Dalidakis
Preceded by Tim Holding	Minister for Tourism and Major Events; 2010–2014	Succeeded by John Eren
Party political offices
Preceded by Phil Honeywood	Deputy Leader of the Liberal Party in Victoria; 2006–2014	Succeeded by David Hodgett
