= Minister for Youth (Victoria) =

Australian state ministry portfolio

Minister for Youth of Victoria
- Victorian coat of arms

- Flag of Victoria

- Incumbent; Natalie Suleyman MP since 5 December 2022
- Style: The Honourable
- Member of: Parliament; Executive council
- Reports to: Premier
- Nominator: Premier
- Appointer: Governor; on the recommendation of the premier
- Term length: At the governor's pleasure
- Inaugural holder: Ian Smith MP
- Formation: 23 August 1972

The Minister for Youth is a ministry portfolio within the Executive Council of Victoria.

== Ministers ==
Order	MP	Party affiliation	Ministerial title	Term start	Term end	Time in office	Notes
1	Ian Smith MP	Liberal	Minister for Youth and Recreation	23 August 1972	30 May 1973	280 days	
2	Brian Dixon MP	Liberal	Minister for Youth, Sport and Recreation	30 May 1973	8 April 1982	8 years, 313 days	
3	Neil Trezise MP	Labor	Minister for Youth, Sport and Recreation	8 April 1982	2 May 1985	3 years, 24 days	
4	Phil Gude MP	Liberal	Minister for Youth Affairs	6 October 1992	9 November 1992	34 days	
5	Vin Heffernan MP	Liberal	Minister Responsible for Youth Affairs	9 November 1992	3 April 1996	3 years, 146 days	
6	Denis Napthine MP	Liberal	Minister for Youth and Community Services	3 April 1996	20 October 1999	3 years, 200 days	
7	Justin Madden MLC	Labor	Minister for Youth Affairs	20 October 1999	12 February 2002	2 years, 115 days	
8	Monica Gould MLC	Labor	Minister for Youth Affairs	12 February 2002	5 December 2002	296 days	
9	Jacinta Allan MP	Labor	Minister for Employment and Youth Affairs	5 December 2002	1 December 2006	3 years, 361 days	
10	James Merlino MP	Labor	Minister for Sport, Recreation and Youth Affairs	1 December 2006	2 December 2010	4 years, 1 day	
11	Ryan Smith MP	Liberal	Minister for Youth Affairs	2 December 2010	4 December 2014	4 years, 2 days	
12	Jenny Mikakos MLC	Labor	Minister for Youth Affairs	4 December 2014	29 November 2018	3 years, 360 days	
13	Gabrielle Williams MP	Labor	Minister for Youth	29 November 2018	23 March 2020	1 year, 115 days	
14	Ros Spence MP	Labor	Minister for Youth	23 March 2020	5 December 2022	2 years, 257 days	
15	Natalie Suleyman MP	Labor	Minister for Youth	5 December 2022	Incumbent	3 years, 350 days	

== See also ==
- Minister for Youth (Australia)
  - Minister for Youth (Western Australia)
  - Minister for Youth (New South Wales)
