= Wade Noonan =

Australian politician

The Honourable Wade Noonan

Member of the Victorian Legislative Assembly for Williamstown
- In office 15 September 2007 – 24 November 2018
- Preceded by: Steve Bracks
- Succeeded by: Melissa Horne

Minister for Police
- In office 4 December 2014 – 23 May 2016
- Preceded by: Kim Wells (Police and Emergency Services)
- Succeeded by: Lisa Neville

Personal details
- Born: 7 April 1971 (age 55)
- Party: Labor
- Education: Swinburne University of Technology

Wade Mathew Noonan (born 7 April 1971) is an Australian former politician. He was a Labor Party member of the Victorian Legislative Assembly from 2007 to 2018, representing the electorate of Williamstown. He was a minister in the Andrews Ministry from December 2014; initially as Minister for Police and Minister for Corrections (2014–2016), and from May 2016 as Minister for Industry and Employment and Minister for Resources.

== Education and early career ==
Noonan studied at Parade College and the Swinburne University of Technology. He worked as a travel manager for STA Travel from 1990 to 1996, before becoming involved in the union movement. He worked as an organiser for the Shop, Distributive and Allied Employees Association from 1996 to 2002, before shifting to the Transport Workers Union of Australia, where he became federal assistant secretary and federal organising and training officer. He remained in this role until his election to parliament. Noonan's father, Bill Noonan, is a long-time TWU official and Victorian state secretary.

== Political career ==
In July 2007, Steve Bracks, the then Premier of Victoria and member for the safe Labor seat of Williamstown, suddenly announced his intention to retire from politics. Noonan emerged as an early favourite to win Labor preselection for the resulting by-election, and won the nomination after a deal to install television presenter Angela Pippos in the seat fell through. He was elected on 15 September 2007, defeating Greens candidate, former City of Maribyrnong mayor and future Senator Janet Rice.

On 8 February 2016, Noonan announced he would be taking a three-month leave of absence from his ministerial and parliamentary positions to undergo counselling due to exposure to traumatic incidents in his work as police minister. In May 2016, he shifted ministries as a result, changing to Minister for Industry and Employment and Minister for Resources. On 4 October 2017, Noonan announced he was resigning from cabinet and would retire from politics at the next election. He resigned on 15 October 2017.

== Post political career ==
Noonan was appointed the Executive Director of the West of Melbourne Economic Development Alliance (WoMEDA) from 2018 to 2021, and then Deputy Vice-Chancellor, External Relations and Partnerships at Victoria University from 2021.

Victorian Legislative Assembly
Preceded by Steve Bracks	Member for Williamstown; 2007–2018	Succeeded by Melissa Horne
Political offices
Preceded by Kim Wells as Minister for Police and Emergency Services	Minister for Police; 2014–2016	Succeeded by Lisa Neville
Preceded by Edward O'Donohue	Minister for Corrections; 2014–2016	Succeeded by Steve Herbert
Preceded by Lily D'Ambrosio as Minister for Industry	Minister for Industry and Employment; 2016–2017	Succeeded by Ben Carroll
Preceded by Lily D'Ambrosio as Minister for Energy and Resources	Minister for Resources; 2016–2017	Succeeded by Tim Pallas
