= Melissa Horne =

Australian politician

The Honourable Melissa Horne MP

Minister for Ports and Freight
- Incumbent
- Assumed office 29 November 2018
- Premier: Daniel Andrews; Jacinta Allan; Ben Carroll
- Preceded by: Luke Donnellan

Minister for Jobs
- Incumbent
- Assumed office 4 August 2026
- Premier: Ben Carroll
- Preceded by: Natalie Suleyman (as Minister for Employment)

Minister for Industry and Advanced Manufacturing
- Incumbent
- Assumed office 4 August 2026
- Premier: Ben Carroll
- Preceded by: Colin Brooks (as Minister for Industry, Advanced Manufacturing and Innovation)

Minister for Defence Industry
- Incumbent
- Assumed office 4 August 2026
- Premier: Ben Carroll
- Preceded by: Colin Brooks
Other ministerial offices
Minister for Health Infrastructure
In office 19 December 2024 – 4 August 2026
Premier	Jacinta Allan
Preceded by	Mary-Anne Thomas
Succeeded by	Position abolished
Minister for Prevention of Family Violence
In office 15 April 2026 – 4 August 2026
Premier	Jacinta Allan
Preceded by	Ingrid Stitt
Succeeded by	Sonya Kilkenny
Minister for Casino, Gaming and Liquor Regulation
In office 22 June 2020 – 19 December 2024
Premier	Daniel AndrewsJacinta Allan
Preceded by	Marlene Kairouz
Succeeded by	Enver Erdogan
Minister for Local GovernmentMinister for Suburban Development
In office 27 June 2022 – 19 December 2024
Premier	Daniel Andrews; Jacinta Allan
Preceded by	Shaun Leane
Succeeded by	Nick Staikos (Local Government) Position abolished (Suburban Development)
Minister for Roads and Road Safety
In office 5 December 2022 – 15 April 2026
Premier	Daniel Andrews; Jacinta Allan
Preceded by	Ben Carroll
Succeeded by	Ros Spence
Minister for Fishing and Boating
In office 22 June 2020 – 27 June 2022
Premier	Daniel Andrews
Preceded by	Jaala Pulford
Succeeded by	Sonya Kilkenny
Minister for Public Transport
In office 29 November 2018 – 22 June 2020
Premier	Daniel Andrews
Preceded by	Jacinta Allan
Succeeded by	Ben Carroll

Member of the Victorian Legislative Assembly for Williamstown
- Incumbent
- Assumed office 24 November 2018
- Preceded by: Wade Noonan

Personal details
- Party: Labor Party
- Relations: Bob Horne (father)
- Children: 2
- Website: melissahornemp.com.au

Melissa Margaret Horne is an Australian politician. She has been a Labor Party member of the Victorian Legislative Assembly since November 2018, representing the seat of Williamstown.

After being elected to parliament, Horne was immediately appointed the Minister for Public Transport and Minister for Ports and Freight in the second Andrews Ministry. In June 2020, she became the Minister for Consumer Affairs, Gaming and Liquor Regulation and Minister for Fishing and Boating, while losing her public transport portfolio. From 27 June 2022 to 19 December 2024, she served as the Minister for Local Government and Minister for Suburban Development but losing her fishing and boating portfolio.

She is the daughter of former federal MP Bob Horne. Before her election, she worked as a communications director of the Level Crossing Removal Authority.

== Electoral history ==
Electoral history of Melissa Horne in the Parliament of Victoria
Year	Electorate	Party	First Preference Result				Two Candidate Result			
Year	Electorate	Party	Votes	%	+%	Position	Votes	%	+%	Result
2018	Williamstown	Labor	21,839	50.36	+5.72	1st	31,273	72.07	+5.53	Elected
2022	Williamstown	Labor	16,173	41.5	−8.2	1st	24,726	63.4	−6.5	Elected

Political offices
Preceded by Shaun Leane	Minister for Local Government; 2022–present	Incumbent
Preceded by Shaun Leane	Minister for Suburban Development; 2022–present	Incumbent
Preceded by Luke Donnellan as Minister for Ports	Minister for Ports & Freight; 2018–present	Incumbent
Preceded by Marlene Kairouz	Minister for Consumer Affairs, Gaming and Liquor Regulation; 2020–present	Incumbent
Preceded by Jaala Pulford	Minister for Fishing and Boating; 2020–2022	Succeeded by Sonya Kilkenny
Preceded by Jacinta Allan	Minister for Public Transport; 2018–2020	Succeeded by Ben Carroll
Parliament of Victoria
Preceded by Wade Noonan	Member for Williamstown; 2018–present	Incumbent
