= Minister for Roads and Road Safety =

Australian state ministry portfolio in Victoria

Minister for Roads and Road Safety of Victoria
- Victorian coat of arms

- Flag of Victoria
- Incumbent; Melissa Horne MP since 5 December 2022
- Style: The Honourable
- Member of: Parliament; Executive council
- Reports to: Premier
- Nominator: Premier
- Appointer: Governor on the recommendation of the premier
- Term length: At the governor's pleasure
- Precursor: Commissioner of Roads and Railways
- Inaugural holder: Bill Baxter MLC
- Formation: 6 October 1992

The Minister for Roads and Road Safety is a ministry portfolio within the Executive Council of Victoria.

== Ministers ==
Order	MP	Party affiliation	Ministerial title	Term start	Term end	Time in office	Notes
1	Bill Baxter MLC	Nationals	Minister for Roads and Ports	6 October 1992	3 April 1996	3 years, 180 days	
2	Geoff Craige MLC	Liberal	Minister for Roads and Ports	3 April 1996	20 October 1999	3 years, 200 days	
3	Tim Pallas MP	Labor	Minister for Roads and Ports	1 December 2006	2 December 2010	4 years, 1 day	
4	Terry Mulder MP	Liberal	Minister for Roads	2 December 2010	4 December 2014	4 years, 2 days	
5	Luke Donnellan MP	Labor	Minister for Roads and Road Safety	4 December 2014	29 November 2018	3 years, 360 days	
6	Jaala Pulford MLC	Labor	Minister for Roads Minister for Road Safety and the TAC	29 November 2018	22 June 2020	1 year, 206 days	
7	Ben Carroll MP	Labor	Minister for Roads and Road Safety	22 June 2020	5 December 2022	2 years, 166 days	
8	Melissa Horne MP	Labor	Minister for Roads and Road Safety	5 December 2022	Incumbent	3 years, 276 days	
