= Minister for Regional Development (Victoria) =

Australian state ministry portfolio

Minister for Regional Development of Victoria
- Victorian coat of arms

- Flag of Victoria
- Incumbent; Jaclyn Symes MLC since 19 December 2024
- Style: The Honourable
- Member of: Parliament; Executive council
- Reports to: Premier
- Nominator: Premier
- Appointer: Governor on the recommendation of the premier
- Term length: At the governor's pleasure
- Inaugural holder: Roger Hallam MLC
- Formation: 6 October 1992

The Minister for Regional Development is a ministry portfolio within the Executive Council of Victoria.

== Ministers ==
Order	MP	Party affiliation	Ministerial title	Term start	Term end	Time in office	Notes
1	Roger Hallam MLC	Nationals	Minister for Regional Development	6 October 1992	13 June 1995	2 years, 250 days	
2	Phil Gude MP	Liberal	Minister for Regional Development	13 June 1995	3 April 1996	295 days	
3	Tom Reynolds MP	Liberal	Minister for Rural Development	3 April 1996	20 October 1999	3 years, 200 days	
4	John Brumby MP	Labor	Minister for State and Regional Development	20 October 1999	1 December 2006	7 years, 42 days	
4	John Brumby MP	Labor	Minister for Regional and Rural Development	1 December 2006	3 August 2007	245 days	
5	Jacinta Allan MP	Labor	Minister for Regional and Rural Development	3 August 2007	2 December 2010	3 years, 121 days	
6	Peter Ryan MP	Nationals	Minister for Regional and Rural Development	2 December 2010	13 March 2013	2 years, 101 days	
7	Jaala Pulford MLC	Labor	Minister for Regional Development	4 December 2014	29 November 2018	3 years, 360 days	
8	Jaclyn Symes MLC	Labor	Minister for Regional Development	29 November 2018	22 December 2020	2 years, 23 days	
9	Mary-Anne Thomas MP	Labor	Minister for Regional Development	22 December 2020	27 June 2022	1 year, 187 days	
10	Harriet Shing MLC	Labor	Minister for Regional Development	27 June 2022	2 October 2023	1 year, 97 days	
11	Gayle Tierney MLC	Labor	Minister for Regional Development	2 October 2023	19 December 2024	1 year, 78 days	
(8)	Jaclyn Symes MLC	Labor	Minister for Regional Development	19 December 2024	Incumbent	1 year, 262 days	
