= Minister for Medical Research (Victoria) =

Australian state ministry portfolio

Minister for Medical Research of Victoria
- Victorian coat of arms

- Flag of Victoria
- Style: The Honourable
- Member of: Parliament; Executive council
- Reports to: Premier
- Nominator: Premier
- Appointer: Governor on the recommendation of the premier
- Term length: At the governor's pleasure
- Inaugural holder: Jaala Pulford MLC
- Formation: 22 June 2020
- Final holder: Ben Carroll MP
- Abolished: 19 December 2024

The Minister for Medical Research was a ministry portfolio within the Executive Council of Victoria.

The position was discontinued in Jacinta Allan's first ministry.

== Ministers ==
Order	MP	Party affiliation	Ministerial title	Term start	Term end	Time in office	Notes
1	Jaala Pulford MLC	Labor	Minister for Innovation, Medical Research and the Digital Economy	22 June 2020	5 December 2022	2 years, 166 days	
2	Mary-Anne Thomas MP	Labor	Minister for Medical Research	5 December 2022	2 October 2023	301 days	
3	Ben Carroll MP	Labor	Minister for Medical Research	2 October 2023	19 December 2024	1 year, 78 days	

== See also ==
- Minister for Medical Research (New South Wales)
