= Philip Dalidakis =

Australian politician (born 1976)

The Honourable Philip Dalidakis

Member of the Victorian Legislative Council for Southern Metropolitan Region
- In office 29 November 2014 – 17 June 2019
- Succeeded by: Enver Erdogan

Personal details
- Born: 25 February 1976 (age 50) Melbourne, Victoria, Australia
- Party: Labor Party

Philip Dalidakis (born 25 February 1976) is an Australian former politician. He was a Labor member of the Victorian Legislative Council, representing Southern Metropolitan Region from 2014 until 2019.

Dalidakis was born in Melbourne. His father was born in Greece and his mother is Jewish. His maternal grandparents escaped from Germany to Shanghai in 1939, and Dalidakis's mother was born there, later migrating to Australia. He is married with three children. Before entering Parliament he was executive officer of the Victorian Association of Forest Industries, and later deputy chief of staff to Senator Stephen Conroy.

On 31 July 2015, Dalidakis was appointed as Minister for Small Business, Innovation and Trade in the Andrews Ministry.

In August 2018, it was reported that Home Affairs Minister Peter Dutton was going to sue Dalidakis after he on Twitter accused Dutton of supporting the White Australia policy and of race baiting.

Dalidakis was not returned to Cabinet upon the re-election of the Andrews Labor Government; his portfolios of Small Business, Innovation and Trade going to former Small Business Minister Adem Somyurek and former Attorney-General Martin Pakula, respectively.

On 17 June 2019, Dalidakis resigned from parliament, in order to take up a senior position with Australia Post. Enver Erdogan was appointed to fill the vacancy caused by Dalidakis' resignation.

Political offices
Preceded by Adem Somyurek	Minister for Small Business, Innovation and Trade (2015–2017); Minister for Small Business (2017–2018); Minister for Innovation and the Digital Economy (2017–2018); Minister for Trade and Investment (2017–2018); 2015–2018	Succeeded by Adem Somyurek as Minister for Small Business
Preceded by Adem Somyurek	Minister for Small Business, Innovation and Trade (2015–2017); Minister for Small Business (2017–2018); Minister for Innovation and the Digital Economy (2017–2018); Minister for Trade and Investment (2017–2018); 2015–2018	Succeeded by Martin Pakula as Minister for Jobs, Innovation & Trade
