= Minister for Small Business (Victoria) =

Australian state ministry portfolio

Minister for Small Business of Victoria
- Victorian coat of arms

- Flag of Victoria
- Incumbent; Natalie Suleyman MP since 5 December 2022
- Style: The Honourable
- Member of: Parliament; Executive council
- Reports to: Premier
- Nominator: Premier
- Appointer: Governor on the recommendation of the premier
- Term length: At the governor's pleasure
- Precursor: Minister for Innovation, Services and Small Business; Minister for Small Business, Innovation and Trade
- Inaugural holder: Barry Rowe MP
- Formation: 18 January 1991

The Minister for Small Business is a minister within the Executive Council of Victoria.

== Ministers for Small Business ==
Order	MP	Party affiliation	Ministerial title	Term start	Term end	Time in office	Notes
1	Barry Rowe MP	Labor	Minister for Small Business	18 January 1991	16 April 1991	88 days	
2	John Harrowfield MP	Labor	Minister for Small Business	16 April 1991	28 January 1992	287 days	
3	Theo Theophanous MLC	Labor	Minister for Small Business	28 January 1992	6 October 1992	252 days	
4	Phil Gude MP	Liberal	Minister for Small Business	6 October 1992	9 November 1992	34 days	
5	Vin Heffernan MP	Liberal	Minister for Small Business	9 November 1992	3 April 1996	3 years, 146 days	
6	Louise Asher MLC	Liberal	Minister for Small Business	3 April 1996	20 October 1999	3 years, 200 days	
7	Marsha Thomson MLC	Labor	Minister for Small Business	20 October 1999	25 January 2005	5 years, 97 days	
8	Andre Haermeyer MP	Labor	Minister for Small Business	25 January 2005	1 December 2006	1 year, 310 days	
(3)	Theo Theophanous MLC	Labor	Minister for Small Business	1 December 2006	3 August 2007	245 days	
9	Joe Helper MP	Labor	Minister for Small Business	3 August 2007	2 December 2010	3 years, 121 days	
(6)	Louise Asher MP	Liberal	Minister for Innovation, Services and Small Business	2 December 2010	17 March 2014	3 years, 105 days	
10	Russell Northe MP	Nationals	Minister for Small Business	17 March 2014	4 December 2014	262 days	
11	Adem Somyurek MLC	Labor	Minister for Small Business, Innovation and Trade	4 December 2014	28 July 2015	236 days	
12	Philip Dalidakis MLC	Labor	Minister for Small Business, Innovation and Trade	31 July 2015	29 November 2018	3 years, 121 days	
(11)	Adem Somyurek MLC	Labor	Minister for Small Business	29 November 2018	15 June 2020	1 year, 199 days	
13	Jaala Pulford MLC	Labor	Minister for Small Business	22 June 2020	5 December 2022	2 years, 166 days	
14	Natalie Suleyman MP	Labor	Minister for Small Business	5 December 2022	Incumbent	3 years, 276 days	
14	Natalie Suleyman MP	Labor	Minister for Small Business and Employment	5 December 2022	Incumbent	3 years, 276 days	

== See also ==
- Minister for Small Business (Australia)
