= Minister for Employment (Victoria) =

Australian state ministry portfolio

Minister for Employment of Victoria
- Victorian coat of arms

- Flag of Victoria
- Incumbent; Natalie Suleyman MP since 2 October 2023
- Style: The Honourable
- Member of: Parliament; Executive council
- Reports to: Premier
- Nominator: Premier
- Appointer: Governor on the recommendation of the premier
- Term length: At the governor's pleasure
- Inaugural holder: Percy Clarey MLC
- Formation: 21 November 1945

The Minister for Employment is a ministry portfolio within the Executive Council of Victoria.

== Ministers ==
Order	MP	Party affiliation	Ministerial title	Term start	Term end	Time in office	Notes
1	Percy Clarey MLC	Labor	Minister of Employment	21 November 1945	20 November 1947	1 year, 364 days	
2	Brian Dixon MP	Liberal	Minister for Employment and Training	23 December 1980	8 April 1982	1 year, 106 days	
3	Jim Simmonds MP	Labor	Minister for Employment and Training	8 April 1982	2 May 1985	3 years, 24 days	
4	Steven Crabb MP	Labor	Minister for Employment and Industrial Affairs	2 May 1985	8 April 1986	341 days	
5	Phil Gude MP	Liberal	Minister for Industry and Employment	6 October 1992	3 April 1996	3 years, 180 days	
6*	Lynne Kosky MP	Labor	Minister for Post Compulsory Education, Training and Employment	20 October 1999	5 December 2002	3 years, 46 days	
7*	John Pandazopoulos MP	Labor	Minister for Employment	12 February 2002	5 December 2002	296 days	
8	Jacinta Allan MP	Labor	Minister for Employment and Youth Affairs	5 December 2002	1 December 2006	3 years, 361 days	
8	Jacinta Allan MP	Labor	Minister for Skills, Education Services and Employment	1 December 2006	3 August 2007	245 days	
9	Louise Asher MP	Liberal	Minister for Employment and Trade	13 March 2013	4 December 2014	1 year, 266 days	
(8)	Jacinta Allan MP	Labor	Minister for Employment	4 December 2014	23 May 2016	1 year, 171 days	
10	Wade Noonan MP	Labor	Minister for Industry and Employment	23 May 2016	4 October 2017	1 year, 134 days	
11	Ben Carroll MP	Labor	Minister for Industry and Employment	16 October 2017	29 November 2018	1 year, 44 days	
12	Jaala Pulford MLC	Labor	Minister for Employment	22 June 2020	5 December 2022	2 years, 166 days	
(11)	Ben Carroll MP	Labor	Minister for Employment	5 December 2022	2 October 2023	301 days	
13	Vicki Ward MP	Labor	Minister for Employment	2 October 2023	19 December 2024	1 year, 78 days	
14	Natalie Suleyman MP	Labor	Minister for Small Business and Employment	19 December 2024	Incumbent	1 year, 262 days	

*terms served concurrently

== See also ==
- Minister for Employment and Workplace Relations
