= Results of the 2022 Victorian state election (Legislative Assembly) =

Australian state election results

This is a list of electoral district results for the 2022 Victorian state election for the Legislative Assembly.

Victorian state election, 26 November 2022 Legislative Assembly << 2018–2026 >>
Enrolled voters	4,394,465				
Votes cast	3,868,615		Turnout	88.03	−2.13
Informal votes	214,410		Informal	5.54	–0.29
Summary of votes by party
Party	Primary votes	%	Swing	Seats	Change
Labor	1,339,496	36.66	–6.20	56	+1
Liberal	1,087,413	29.76	−0.67	19	–2
Greens	420,201	11.50	+0.79	4	+1
National	172,687	4.73	−0.04	9	+3
Family First	111,478	3.05	+3.05	0	±0
Animal Justice	91,646	2.51	+0.69	0	±0
Freedom	64,066	1.75	+1.75	0	±0
Victorian Socialists	48,865	1.34	+0.90	0	±0
Democratic Labour	45,026	1.23	+0.54	0	±0
Liberal Democrats	14,116	0.39	+0.27	0	±0
Shooters, Fishers, Farmers	11,588	0.32	–0.37	0	±0
Reason	10,907	0.30	–0.06	0	±0
One Nation	10,323	0.28	+0.28	0	±0
Justice	7,927	0.22	–0.04	0	±0
Legalise Cannabis	5,838	0.16	+0.16	0	±0
New Democrats	4,874	0.13	+0.13	0	±0
Angry Victorians	3,037	0.08	+0.08	0	±0
Health Australia	862	0.02	+0.02	0	±0
Transport Matters	605	0.02	–0.27	0	±0
Companions and Pets	526	0.01	+0.01	0	±0
Independent	202,724	5.55	–0.52	0	–3
Total	3,654,205			88	
Two-party-preferred
Labor	1,989,350	55.00	–2.30		
Liberal/National	1,627,650	45.00	+2.30		

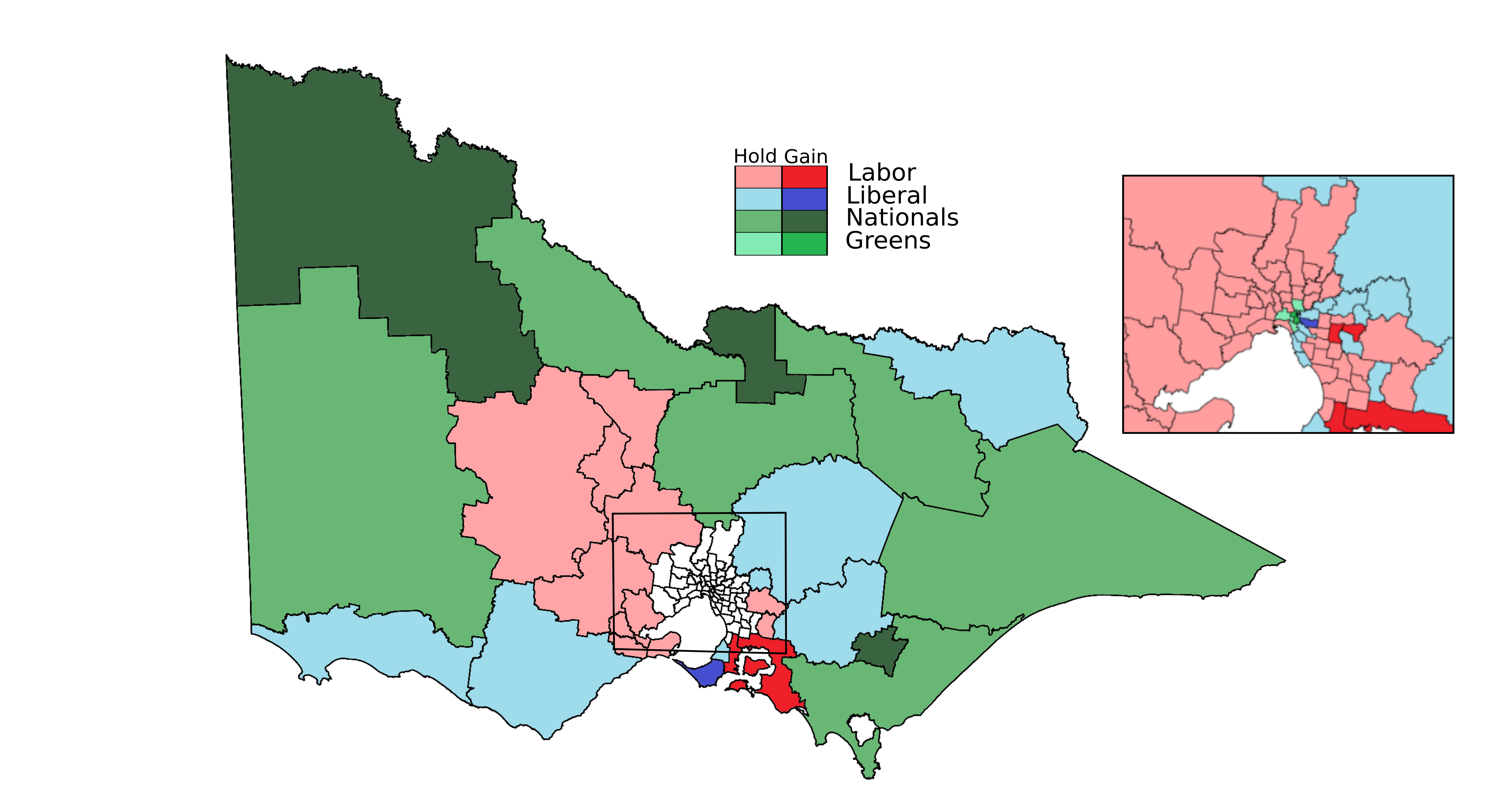
Results of the 2022 election with held and gained seats

== Results by electoral district ==
=== Albert Park ===
2022 Victorian state election: Albert Park
Party	Candidate	Votes	%	±%
Labor	Nina Taylor	14,254	36.4	−7.0
Liberal	Lauren Sherson	11,659	29.8	−1.6
Greens	Kim Samiotis	8,178	20.9	+4.5
Independent	Georgie Dragwidge	2,294	5.9	+5.9
Animal Justice	Cassandra Westwood	1,207	3.1	−0.9
Liberal Democrats	Lance Smart	534	1.4	+1.4
Freedom	Elizabeth Antunovic	518	1.3	+1.3
Family First	Viorel Bradea	466	1.2	+1.2
Total formal votes		39,110	96.6	+1.4
Informal votes		1,396	3.4	−1.4
Turnout		40,506	83.0	−0.7
Two-party-preferred result
Labor	Nina Taylor	23,916	61.2	−1.9
Liberal	Lauren Sherson	15,194	38.8	+1.9
Labor hold		Swing	−1.9	

=== Ashwood ===
2022 Victorian state election: Ashwood
Party	Candidate	Votes	%	±%
Labor	Matt Fregon	18,014	40.3	−0.1
Liberal	Asher Judah	16,618	37.2	−7.1
Greens	Peter Morgan	6,612	14.8	+2.7
Animal Justice	Milton Griffiths	880	2.0	+0.5
Family First	Keith Geyer	847	1.9	+1.9
Independent	Lynnette Saloumi	704	1.6	+1.6
Freedom	Norman F. Baker	568	1.3	+1.3
Independent	Michael Doyle	467	1.0	+1.0
Total formal votes		44,710	96.6	+0.7
Informal votes		1,565	3.4	−0.7
Turnout		46,275	90.4	–0.0
Two-party-preferred result
Labor	Matt Fregon	25,106	56.2	+4.2
Liberal	Asher Judah	19,604	43.8	−4.2
Labor hold		Swing	+4.2	

=== Bass ===
2022 Victorian state election: Bass
Party	Candidate	Votes	%	±%
Labor	Jordan Crugnale	13,478	32.6	−4.1
Liberal	Aaron Brown	12,482	30.1	−13.4
National	Brett Tessari	5,506	13.3	+13.3
Greens	Callum Bugbird	3,369	8.1	+1.9
Democratic Labour	Mark O'Neill	1,465	3.5	+1.7
Family First	Martin Verhagen	1,164	2.8	+2.8
Animal Justice	Elly Mousellis	1,085	2.6	+1.4
Freedom	Marcus Munday	1,013	2.4	+2.4
Independent	Jeni Jobe	970	2.3	+2.3
Independent	Meg Edwards	872	2.1	+2.1
Total formal votes		41,404	93.0	–0.6
Informal votes		3,135	7.0	+0.6
Turnout		44,539	89.1	+4.5
Two-party-preferred result
Labor	Jordan Crugnale	20,803	50.2	+0.9
Liberal	Aaron Brown	20,601	49.8	−0.9
Labor notional gain from Liberal		Swing	+0.9	

=== Bayswater ===
2022 Victorian state election: Bayswater
Party	Candidate	Votes	%	±%
Labor	Jackson Taylor	17,609	41.3	+0.5
Liberal	Nick Wakeling	15,174	35.6	−12.1
Greens	Nadia Sirninger Rankin	3,151	7.4	−1.4
Legalise Cannabis	Ashley Heap	1,653	3.9	+3.9
Family First	Gary Coombes	1,397	3.3	+3.3
Democratic Labour	Thomas Dolan	948	2.2	+2.2
Freedom	Chris Field	937	2.2	+2.2
Independent	Chloe Mackallah	890	2.1	+2.1
Animal Justice	Alyssa Wormald	840	2.0	−0.6
Total formal votes		42,599	94.4	+0.0
Informal votes		2,512	5.6	−0.0
Turnout		45,111	90.8	−0.4
Two-party-preferred result
Labor	Jackson Taylor	23,101	54.2	+4.8
Liberal	Nick Wakeling	19,498	45.8	−4.8
Labor notional gain from Liberal		Swing	+4.8	

=== Bellarine ===
2022 Victorian state election: Bellarine
Party	Candidate	Votes	%	±%
Labor	Alison Marchant	20,103	42.6	−7.1
Liberal	Donnie Grigau	15,617	33.1	−2.5
Greens	Rachel Semmens	5,537	11.7	+2.6
Independent	Sarah Fenton	2,158	4.6	+4.6
Animal Justice	Adam Cardilini	1,088	2.3	−2.2
Family First	Guy Manuell	1,033	2.2	+2.2
Justice	Brett Anthony Ritchie	770	1.6	+1.6
Freedom	Kylee Muse	458	1.0	+1.0
Angry Victorians	Brendan Taylor	389	0.8	+0.8
Total formal votes		47,153	95.6	–0.4
Informal votes		2,156	4.4	+0.4
Turnout		49,309	89.6	+3.3
Two-party-preferred result
Labor	Alison Marchant	27,567	58.5	−3.0
Liberal	Donnie Grigau	19,586	41.5	+3.0
Labor hold		Swing	−3.0	

=== Benambra ===
2022 Victorian state election: Benambra
Party	Candidate	Votes	%	±%
Liberal	Bill Tilley	17,658	42.9	+2.8
Independent	Jacqui Hawkins	13,038	31.7	+15.6
Labor	Mark Tait	5,375	13.1	−4.6
Greens	Luke Brady	1,592	3.9	+0.4
Animal Justice	Mike Fuery	1,170	2.8	+2.8
Family First	Janelle Stratton	815	2.0	+2.0
Liberal Democrats	Dean Rossiter	804	2.0	+2.0
Freedom	Adrian James O'Brien	683	1.7	+1.7
Total formal votes		41,135	95.1	+0.5
Informal votes		2,099	4.9	−0.5
Turnout		43,234	86.4	+0.5
Notional two-party-preferred count
Liberal	Bill Tilley	26,021	63.3	+4.0
Labor	Mark Tait	15,114	36.7	−4.0
Two-candidate-preferred result
Liberal	Bill Tilley	20,956	50.9	−1.6
Independent	Jacqui Hawkins	20,179	49.1	+1.6
Liberal hold		Swing	−1.6	

=== Bendigo East ===
2022 Victorian state election: Bendigo East
Party	Candidate	Votes	%	±%
Labor	Jacinta Allan	22,010	48.3	−2.0
Liberal	Darin Schade	12,478	27.4	+6.5
Greens	Michael Tolhurst	3,944	8.7	+0.7
One Nation	Ben Mihail	2,597	5.7	+5.7
Ind. (Australia One)	James Laurie	1,603	3.5	+3.5
Animal Justice	Vyonne McLelland-Howe	1,574	3.5	+3.5
Family First	Evelyn Keetelaar	1,362	3.0	+3.0
Total formal votes		45,568	95.4	−0.2
Informal votes		2,184	4.6	+0.2
Turnout		47,752	89.9	−2.3
Two-party-preferred result
Labor	Jacinta Allan	27,727	60.8	−1.3
Liberal	Darin Schade	17,841	39.2	+1.3
Labor hold		Swing	−1.3	

=== Bendigo West ===
2022 Victorian state election: Bendigo West
Party	Candidate	Votes	%	±%
Labor	Maree Edwards	18,704	46.5	−7.0
Liberal	Ken Price	10,057	25.0	−2.1
Greens	James Searle	4,634	11.5	−1.5
Legalise Cannabis	Wayne Taylor	2,175	5.4	+5.4
Family First	Steve Serpell	1,704	4.2	+4.2
Animal Justice	Victoria Maxwell	1,040	2.6	−3.8
Independent	Matt Bansemer	979	2.4	+2.4
Freedom	Richard James Woolley	606	1.5	+1.5
Independent	Marilyn Nuske	349	0.9	+0.9
Total formal votes		40,248	94.4	−0.7
Informal votes		2,401	5.6	+0.7
Turnout		42,649	89.2	−2.0
Two-party-preferred result
Labor	Maree Edwards	25,999	64.6	−4.0
Liberal	Ken Price	14,249	35.4	+4.0
Labor hold		Swing	−4.0	

=== Bentleigh ===
2022 Victorian state election: Bentleigh
Party	Candidate	Votes	%	±%
Labor	Nick Staikos	20,656	45.8	−3.9
Liberal	Debbie Taylor-Haynes	16,401	36.3	+3.0
Greens	Alana Galli-McRostie	4,845	10.7	+2.5
Family First	Paul Ryan	1,331	2.9	+2.9
Animal Justice	David Harris	1,098	2.4	+0.7
Ind. (Fusion)	Simon Gnieslaw	789	1.7	+1.7
Total formal votes		45,120	97.0	+3.2
Informal votes		1,408	3.0	−3.2
Turnout		46,528	90.5	−0.5
Two-party-preferred result
Labor	Nick Staikos	26,153	58.0	−3.4
Liberal	Debbie Taylor-Haynes	18,972	42.0	+3.4
Labor hold		Swing	−3.4	

=== Berwick ===
2022 Victorian state election: Berwick
Party	Candidate	Votes	%	±%
Liberal	Brad Battin	20,031	45.2	−2.6
Labor	Malik Zaveer	15,874	35.8	−6.6
Greens	Hayley Perry	4,297	9.7	+2.4
Freedom	Kerry Haupt	1,570	3.5	+3.5
Family First	Joel van der Horst	1,488	3.4	+3.4
Animal Justice	Katherine Dolheguy	1,029	2.3	+2.3
Total formal votes		44,288	95.9	+1.7
Informal votes		1,876	4.1	−1.7
Turnout		46,164	88.9	+0.2
Two-party-preferred result
Liberal	Brad Battin	24,230	54.7	+3.4
Labor	Malik Zaveer	20,058	45.3	−3.4
Liberal hold		Swing	+3.4	

=== Box Hill ===
2022 Victorian state election: Box Hill
Party	Candidate	Votes	%	±%
Labor	Paul Hamer	18,340	41.3	+0.4
Liberal	Nicole Werner	15,593	35.2	−8.9
Greens	Joanne Shan	6,267	14.1	+0.7
Democratic Labour	Paul Dean	1,083	2.4	+2.4
Animal Justice	Sebastian Folloni	824	1.9	+1.2
Family First	Gary Ong	809	1.8	+1.8
Freedom	Alicia Riera	541	1.2	+1.2
Independent	Wayne Tseng	464	1.0	+1.0
Independent	Cameron Liston	436	1.0	+1.0
Total formal votes		44,357	96.4	+0.8
Informal votes		1,635	3.6	−0.8
Turnout		45,992	90.5	+2.3
Two-party-preferred result
Labor	Paul Hamer	25,383	57.2	+4.1
Liberal	Nicole Werner	18,973	42.8	−4.1
Labor hold		Swing	+4.1	

=== Brighton ===
2022 Victorian state election: Brighton
Party	Candidate	Votes	%	±%
Liberal	James Newbury	18,791	45.6	+0.8
Labor	Louise Crawford	10,164	24.7	−7.4
Greens	Sarah Dekiere	5,680	13.8	−1.1
Independent	Felicity Frederico	3,749	9.1	+9.1
Independent	Sally Gibson	941	2.3	+2.3
Animal Justice	Alicia Walker	851	2.1	−2.8
Family First	Nick Sciola	558	1.4	+1.4
Ind. (Protector)	John Tiger Casley	251	0.6	−0.2
Independent	Allan L. Timms	211	0.5	+0.5
Total formal votes		41,196	95.8	+0.1
Informal votes		1,786	4.2	−0.1
Turnout		42,982	89.1	+1.5
Two-party-preferred result
Liberal	James Newbury	22,710	55.1	+4.6
Labor	Louise Crawford	18,486	44.9	−4.6
Liberal hold		Swing	+4.6	

=== Broadmeadows ===
2022 Victorian state election: Broadmeadows
Party	Candidate	Votes	%	±%
Labor	Kathleen Matthews-Ward	15,899	45.7	−10.8
Liberal	Baris Duzova	8,044	23.1	+8.0
Greens	Joe Aguilus	2,908	8.4	+0.5
Victorian Socialists	Omar Hassan	2,795	8.0	+3.2
Family First	Bienne Tam	1,611	4.6	+4.6
Independent	Mohamad Elmustapha	1,316	3.8	+3.8
Animal Justice	Candace Feild	1,030	3.0	+2.3
Reason	Ben Sutter	815	2.3	+2.3
Ind. (Socialist Alliance)	Arie Huybregts	362	1.0	+1.0
Total formal votes		34,780	89.2	−1.5
Informal votes		4,198	10.8	+1.5
Turnout		38,978	80.5	−3.5
Two-party-preferred result
Labor	Kathleen Matthews-Ward	22,781	65.5	−9.7
Liberal	Baris Duzova	11,999	34.5	+9.7
Labor hold		Swing	−9.7	

=== Brunswick ===
2022 Victorian state election: Brunswick
Party	Candidate	Votes	%	±%
Greens	Tim Read	18,959	43.6	+1.2
Labor	Mike Williams	12,392	28.5	−9.4
Liberal	Minh Quan Nguyen	4,723	10.9	+2.6
Victorian Socialists	Nahui Jimenez	3,506	8.1	+8.1
Reason	Shea Evans	1,933	4.4	−0.3
Animal Justice	Rachel Lamarche-Beauchesne	699	1.6	−0.5
Independent	Anthony Helou	551	1.3	+1.3
Family First	Lilian Sabry Shaker	529	1.2	+1.2
Independent	Kenneth Charles Taylor	153	0.4	+0.4
Total formal votes		43,445	96.2	+2.0
Informal votes		1,733	3.8	−2.0
Turnout		45,178	86.4	−0.9
Notional two-party-preferred count
Labor	Mike Williams	36,518	84.1	−0.5
Liberal	Minh Quan Nguyen	6,927	15.9	+0.5
Two-candidate-preferred result
Greens	Tim Read	27,664	63.7	+11.7
Labor	Mike Williams	15,781	36.3	−11.7
Greens hold		Swing	+11.7	

=== Bulleen ===
2022 Victorian state election: Bulleen
Party	Candidate	Votes	%	±%
Liberal	Matthew Guy	20,645	48.1	−3.6
Labor	Ian Rogers	14,052	32.7	−4.1
Greens	Kellie Stafford	4,576	10.7	−0.3
Freedom	Voula Patrikios	1,172	2.7	+2.7
Family First	Jason Stokes	1,014	2.4	+2.4
Animal Justice	Elnaz Jafari	867	2.0	+1.6
Independent	Sanjeev Sabhlok	419	1.0	+1.0
Independent	David Vincent	214	0.5	+0.5
Total formal votes		42,959	94.9	+1.4
Informal votes		2,326	5.1	−1.4
Turnout		45,285	89.7	+0.6
Two-party-preferred result
Liberal	Matthew Guy	24,030	55.9	+0.4
Labor	Ian Rogers	18,929	44.1	−0.4
Liberal hold		Swing	+0.4	

=== Bundoora ===
2022 Victorian state election: Bundoora
Party	Candidate	Votes	%	±%
Labor	Colin Brooks	19,288	47.8	−7.7
Liberal	Sahil Tomar	11,167	27.7	−1.8
Greens	Julie O'Brien	5,311	13.2	+5.1
Freedom	Andrew Lu	1,637	4.1	+4.1
Family First	Ethan Jones	1,294	3.2	+3.2
Animal Justice	Bella Holgate	1,231	3.1	+0.6
Ind. (Child Protection)	Eric Koelmeyer	408	1.0	+1.0
Total formal votes		40,336	94.8	+0.5
Informal votes		2,209	5.2	−0.5
Turnout		42,545	89.9	−0.3
Two-party-preferred result
Labor	Colin Brooks	25,288	62.7	−3.6
Liberal	Sahil Tomar	15,048	37.3	+3.6
Labor hold		Swing	−3.6	

=== Carrum ===
2022 Victorian state election: Carrum
Party	Candidate	Votes	%	±%
Labor	Sonya Kilkenny	21,586	49.9	−3.1
Liberal	Bec Buchanan	13,141	30.3	−2.3
Greens	Jayde Lillico	3,282	7.6	+2.1
Freedom	Georgia Erevnidis	1,750	4.0	+4.0
Family First	Jeremy Cameron	1,354	3.1	+3.1
Animal Justice	Taylor Macgregor Owen	1,201	2.8	+2.8
Independent	Damian Willis	986	2.3	+2.3
Total formal votes		43,294	95.2	+1.1
Informal votes		2,183	4.8	−1.1
Turnout		45,477	88.7	−1.7
Two-party-preferred result
Labor	Sonya Kilkenny	25,871	59.8	−2.2
Liberal	Bec Buchanan	17,423	40.2	+2.2
Labor hold		Swing	−2.2	

=== Caulfield ===
2022 Victorian state election: Caulfield
Party	Candidate	Votes	%	±%
Liberal	David Southwick	18,088	44.5	−1.6
Labor	Lior Harel	11,301	27.8	−6.2
Greens	Rachel Iampolski	6,447	15.8	+1.1
Independent	Nomi Kaltmann	2,643	6.5	+6.5
Animal Justice	Asher Myerson	908	2.2	−0.8
Liberal Democrats	Michael Abelman	739	1.8	+1.8
Family First	Lynne Edwell	557	1.4	+1.4
Total formal votes		40,683	96.7	+1.1
Informal votes		1,374	3.3	−1.1
Turnout		42,057	86.7	−1.4
Two-party-preferred result
Liberal	David Southwick	21,183	52.1	+2.0
Labor	Lior Harel	19,500	47.9	−2.0
Liberal hold		Swing	+2.0	

=== Clarinda ===
2022 Victorian state election: Clarinda
Party	Candidate	Votes	%	±%
Labor	Meng Heang Tak	18,441	45.5	−9.1
Liberal	Anthony Richardson	11,593	28.6	+1.0
Greens	Jessamine Moffett	3,227	7.9	+0.9
Independent	Caroline White	3,167	7.8	+7.8
Family First	Karen Hastings	1,215	3.0	+3.0
Independent	Hung Vo	1,122	2.8	+0.0
Animal Justice	Sue Litchfield	1,005	2.5	+0.3
Freedom	Steve Wolfe	794	1.9	+1.9
Total formal votes		40,564	94.2	+0.8
Informal votes		2,477	5.8	−0.8
Turnout		43,041	88.8	−0.6
Two-party-preferred result
Labor	Meng Heang Tak	24,416	60.2	−4.7
Liberal	Anthony Richardson	16,148	39.8	+4.7
Labor hold		Swing	−4.7	

=== Cranbourne ===
2022 Victorian state election: Cranbourne
Party	Candidate	Votes	%	±%
Labor	Pauline Richards	18,853	46.2	−2.5
Liberal	Jagdeep Singh	11,230	27.5	−6.9
Greens	Kiran Vempati	2,282	5.6	+1.6
Family First	Bradley Harvey	2,249	5.5	+5.5
Democratic Labour	Chris Norton	2,044	5.0	+3.4
Freedom	Gerardine Frances Hansen	1,790	4.4	+4.4
Justice	Peter Bernard Philpott	1,126	2.7	−1.9
Animal Justice	Gwynne Brennan	1,006	2.5	+2.5
Independent	Ravi Ragupathy	242	0.6	+0.6
Total formal votes		40,822	92.7	+0.4
Informal votes		3,234	7.3	−0.4
Turnout		44,056	86.1	+6.2
Two-party-preferred result
Labor	Pauline Richards	24,073	59.0	−0.3
Liberal	Jagdeep Singh	16,749	41.0	+0.3
Labor hold		Swing	−0.3	

=== Croydon ===
2022 Victorian state election: Croydon
Party	Candidate	Votes	%	±%
Liberal	David Hodgett	19,605	43.0	−3.4
Labor	Sorina Grasso	15,564	34.1	−5.5
Greens	Brendan Powell	4,940	10.8	+1.9
Family First	Dan Nebauer	2,051	4.5	+4.5
Democratic Labour	Sophia De Wit	1,978	4.3	+4.3
Animal Justice	Harley McDonald-Eckersall	1,501	3.3	−1.2
Total formal votes		45,639	95.7	+0.9
Informal votes		2,054	4.3	−0.9
Turnout		47,693	90.8	+0.8
Two-party-preferred result
Liberal	David Hodgett	23,446	51.4	+0.4
Labor	Sorina Grasso	22,193	48.6	−0.4
Liberal hold		Swing	+0.4	

=== Dandenong ===
2022 Victorian state election: Dandenong
Party	Candidate	Votes	%	±%
Labor	Gabrielle Williams	21,677	54.9	−9.6
Liberal	Karen Broadley	8,475	21.5	−1.2
Greens	Matthew Kirwan	3,215	8.1	+1.1
Family First	Audrey Harmse	2,719	6.9	+6.9
Freedom	Anthony Levchenko	1,478	3.7	+3.7
Animal Justice	Andrew Klop	982	2.5	+1.6
Liberal Democrats	Tham Turner	961	2.4	+2.4
Total formal votes		39,505	92.5	+1.2
Informal votes		3,195	7.5	−1.2
Turnout		42,700	84.0	−2.3
Two-party-preferred result
Labor	Gabrielle Williams	26,970	68.3	−4.8
Liberal	Karen Broadley	12,535	31.7	+4.8
Labor hold		Swing	−4.8	

=== Eildon ===
2022 Victorian state election: Eildon
Party	Candidate	Votes	%	±%
Liberal	Cindy McLeish	20,119	47.4	+0.7
Labor	Jane Judd	12,284	29.0	−7.9
Greens	Wil Mikelsons	4,753	11.2	+0.4
Family First	Tim Lacey	1,437	3.4	+3.4
Freedom	Joshua Rusic	1,426	3.4	+3.4
Animal Justice	Chloe Bond	1,340	3.2	+3.2
Ind. (Fusion)	Kammy Cordner Hunt	581	1.4	+1.4
Ind. (Aligned Australia)	Robert Thornton	459	1.1	+1.1
Total formal votes		42,399	94.8	+0.1
Informal votes		2,343	5.2	−0.1
Turnout		44,742	89.3	−1.8
Two-party-preferred result
Liberal	Cindy McLeish	24,162	57.0	+5.9
Labor	Jane Judd	18,237	43.0	−5.9
Liberal hold		Swing	+5.9	

=== Eltham ===
2022 Victorian state election: Eltham
Party	Candidate	Votes	%	±%
Labor	Vicki Ward	19,509	44.5	−5.3
Liberal	Jason McClintock	15,615	35.6	−1.2
Greens	Alex Grimes	5,897	13.5	+3.0
Family First	Hugh Stubley	1,118	2.5	+2.5
Animal Justice	Catriona Marshall	995	2.3	+2.3
Democratic Labour	Leila Karimi	710	1.6	−0.2
Total formal votes		43,844	96.7	+1.1
Informal votes		1,507	3.3	−1.1
Turnout		45,351	92.7	−1.5
Two-party-preferred result
Labor	Vicki Ward	25,870	59.0	−1.5
Liberal	Jason McClintock	17,974	41.0	+1.5
Labor hold		Swing	−1.5	

=== Essendon ===
2022 Victorian state election: Essendon
Party	Candidate	Votes	%	±%
Labor	Danny Pearson	17,196	41.1	−5.1
Liberal	Angelo Baronessa	12,331	29.5	+1.9
Greens	Jared Prentis	6,344	15.1	−1.7
Victorian Socialists	Daniel Nair Dadich	1,951	4.7	+4.7
Animal Justice	Gayle Williams	1,173	2.8	+2.8
Reason	Nicholas Hope	1,018	2.4	+2.4
Freedom	David Wright	1,006	2.4	+2.4
Family First	Margaret Muir	848	2.0	+2.0
Total formal votes		41,867	96.0	+0.7
Informal votes		1,761	4.0	−0.7
Turnout		43,628	88.1	+0.1
Two-party-preferred result
Labor	Danny Pearson	26,146	62.5	−3.4
Liberal	Angelo Baronessa	15,721	37.5	+3.4
Labor hold		Swing	−3.4	

=== Eureka ===
2022 Victorian state election: Eureka
Party	Candidate	Votes	%	±%
Labor	Michaela Settle	18,531	41.0	−3.6
Liberal	Paul Tatchell	14,320	31.6	+0.7
Greens	Sam McColl	4,887	10.8	+1.7
Democratic Labour	Tabitha Rickard	1,821	4.0	+3.4
Animal Justice	Wendy Morrison	1,519	3.4	−0.5
Family First	Adrian Garcia	1,233	2.7	+2.7
Independent	Nicola Reid	1,083	2.4	+2.4
Freedom	Anthony Joseph Giampaolo	967	2.1	+2.1
Independent	Michael Ray	666	1.5	+1.5
Independent	Mark William Banwell	220	0.5	+0.5
Total formal votes		45,247	93.2	+1.0
Informal votes		3,297	6.8	−1.0
Turnout		48,544	89.1	−18
Two-party-preferred result
Labor	Michaela Settle	25,869	57.2	−2.4
Liberal	Paul Tatchell	19,378	42.8	+2.4
Labor hold		Swing	−2.4	

=== Euroa ===
2022 Victorian state election: Euroa
Party	Candidate	Votes	%	±%
National	Annabelle Cleeland	13,496	32.0	−27.4
Labor	Angela Tough	12,840	30.4	+2.3
Liberal	Brad Hearn	9,227	21.8	+21.8
Greens	James Bennett	2,245	5.3	+0.1
Freedom	Raymond Mark Rowbotham	1,770	4.2	+4.2
Family First	Paul Bachelor	1,494	3.5	+3.5
Animal Justice	Elaine Haddock	1,170	2.8	+2.8
Total formal votes		42,242	94.6	+0.0
Informal votes		2,431	5.4	−0.0
Turnout		44,673	88.2	+0.6
Two-party-preferred result
National	Annabelle Cleeland	25,316	59.9	−5.4
Labor	Angela Tough	16,926	40.1	+5.4
National hold		Swing	−5.4	

=== Evelyn ===
2022 Victorian state election: Evelyn
Party	Candidate	Votes	%	±%
Liberal	Bridget Vallence	20,385	46.7	−1.8
Labor	Lorna Dent	14,277	32.7	−8.0
Greens	Andrew Henley	4,052	9.3	−0.4
Family First	Jeanette Dobson	2,318	5.3	+5.3
Animal Justice	Jan Heald	1,819	4.2	+4.2
Independent	Nat De Francesco	448	1.0	+1.0
Independent	Rosalie De Francesco	366	0.8	+0.8
Total formal votes		43,664	95.1	+0.8
Informal votes		2,255	4.9	−0.8
Turnout		45,919	91.5	+2.6
Two-party-preferred result
Liberal	Bridget Vallence	24,190	55.4	+3.6
Labor	Lorna Dent	19,474	44.6	−3.6
Liberal hold		Swing	+3.6	

=== Footscray ===
2022 Victorian state election: Footscray
Party	Candidate	Votes	%	±%
Labor	Katie Hall	17,387	43.1	−11.8
Greens	Elena Pereyra	9,045	22.4	+2.2
Liberal	Emete Joesika	7,214	17.9	+0.8
Victorian Socialists	Jorge Jorquera	3,769	9.3	+9.3
Democratic Labour	Alan Williams	1,098	2.7	+2.7
Animal Justice	Shohre Mansouri Jajaee	989	2.5	−3.5
Family First	Russell Muir	838	2.1	+2.1
Total formal votes		40,340	96.1	+1.5
Informal votes		1,654	3.9	−1.5
Turnout		41,994	86.0	+0.4
Notional two-party-preferred count
Labor	Katie Hall	30,523	75.7	−3.0
Liberal	Emete Joesika	9,817	24.3	+3.0
Two-candidate-preferred result
Labor	Katie Hall	21,880	54.2	−13.9
Greens	Elena Pereyra	18,460	45.8	+13.9
Labor hold		Swing	−13.9	

=== Frankston ===
2022 Victorian state election: Frankston
Party	Candidate	Votes	%	±%
Labor	Paul Edbrooke	16,595	41.6	−4.8
Liberal	Michael O'Reilly	11,762	29.4	−2.9
Greens	Emily Green	5,060	12.7	+5.0
Freedom	Dragan Suric	1,443	3.6	+3.6
Liberal Democrats	Chrysten Abraham	1,420	3.6	+3.6
Animal Justice	Elizabeth Johnston	1,365	3.4	+0.6
Family First	Richard Brown	1,083	2.7	+2.7
Ind. (Australia One)	Darren Paul Bergwerf	844	2.1	+2.1
Independent	Henry Kelsall	369	0.9	–1.0
Total formal votes		39,941	95.3	+0.6
Informal votes		2,323	5.5	−0.6
Turnout		42,264	86.0	−1.4
Two-party-preferred result
Labor	Paul Edbrooke	23,429	58.7	−1.5
Liberal	Michael O'Reilly	16,512	41.3	+1.5
Labor hold		Swing	−1.5	

=== Geelong ===
2022 Victorian state election: Geelong
Party	Candidate	Votes	%	±%
Labor	Christine Couzens	20,754	46.4	+4.5
Liberal	James Bennett-Hullin	12,194	27.2	+5.3
Greens	Aleisha Smith	6,849	15.3	+6.3
Family First	Madeleine Parker-Hill	2,051	4.6	+4.6
Animal Justice	Bob Motta	1,465	3.3	+0.2
Ind. (Socialist Alliance)	Angela Carr	994	2.2	+2.2
Independent	Stephen Juhasz	455	1.0	+1.0
Total formal votes		44,762	95.9	+0.4
Informal votes		1,918	4.1	−0.4
Turnout		46,680	89.1	−1.1
Two-party-preferred result
Labor	Christine Couzens	28,965	64.7	+4.4
Liberal	James Bennett-Hullin	15,797	35.3	−4.4
Labor hold		Swing	+4.4	

=== Gippsland East ===
2022 Victorian state election: Gippsland East
Party	Candidate	Votes	%	±%
National	Tim Bull	26,737	63.3	+6.6
Labor	Stephen Richardson	7,191	17.0	−4.7
Greens	Nissa Ling	2,691	6.4	+0.2
Shooters, Fishers, Farmers	Ricky Muir	2,460	5.8	+5.8
Freedom	Ed Barnes	1,340	3.2	+3.2
Family First	Carl John Fechner	1,068	2.5	+2.5
Animal Justice	Sally Court	725	1.7	+1.7
Total formal votes		42,209	95.5	+1.2
Informal votes		1,995	4.5	−1.2
Turnout		44,204	89.0	+1.3
Two-party-preferred result
National	Tim Bull	31,475	74.6	+7.0
Labor	Stephen Richardson	10,734	25.4	−7.0
National hold		Swing	+7.0	

=== Gippsland South ===
2022 Victorian state election: Gippsland South
Party	Candidate	Votes	%	±%
National	Danny O'Brien	22,566	53.3	−5.3
Labor	Denise Ryan	9,920	23.4	−4.8
Greens	Jay Tiziani-Simpson	3,538	8.3	−0.9
Independent	Clay Esler	2,414	5.7	+5.7
Freedom	Angela Newnham	1,357	3.2	+3.2
Animal Justice	Helen Jeges	1,350	3.2	+3.2
Family First	Paul Furlong	1,218	2.9	+2.9
Total formal votes		42,351	94.7	+0.4
Informal votes		2,363	5.3	−0.4
Turnout		44,714	90.0	+0.7
Two-party-preferred result
National	Danny O'Brien	27,763	65.6	+1.6
Labor	Denise Ryan	14,588	34.4	−1.6
National hold		Swing	+1.6	

=== Glen Waverley ===
2022 Victorian state election: Glen Waverley
Party	Candidate	Votes	%	±%
Labor	John Mullahy	18,153	40.6	−1.5
Liberal	Neil Angus	17,941	40.2	−8.0
Greens	Steph Partridge	4,270	9.6	+1.3
Democratic Labour	Scott Marsh	1,856	4.1	+3.9
Family First	Kristeen Huisman	972	2.2	+2.2
Animal Justice	Maddy Hance	802	1.8	+1.8
Freedom	Joyce Maree Harris	664	1.5	+1.5
Total formal votes		44,667	96.7	+1.5
Informal votes		1,529	3.3	−1.5
Turnout		46,196	90.9	−3.0
Two-party-preferred result
Labor	John Mullahy	23,809	53.3	+4.2
Liberal	Neil Angus	20,858	46.7	−4.2
Labor notional gain from Liberal		Swing	+4.2	

=== Greenvale ===
2022 Victorian state election: Greenvale
Party	Candidate	Votes	%	±%
Labor	Iwan Walters	15,628	41.5	−18.6
Liberal	Usman Ghani	9,568	25.4	+1.1
Family First	Maria Bengtsson	2,778	7.4	+7.4
Victorian Socialists	Mutullah Can Yolbulan	2,582	6.9	+2.0
Independent	Fatma Erciyas	2,416	6.4	+6.4
Greens	Cristina Santa-Isabel	2,194	5.8	−1.1
Animal Justice	Rosanna Furina	1,295	3.4	+3.4
Freedom	Lauren Styles	1,225	3.2	+3.2
Total formal votes		37,686	91.9	−1.8
Informal votes		3,952	9.5	+1.8
Turnout		41,638	83.5	+3.2
Two-party-preferred result
Labor	Iwan Walters	21,506	57.1	−14.9
Liberal	Usman Ghani	16,180	42.9	+14.9
Labor hold		Swing	−14.9	

=== Hastings ===
2022 Victorian state election: Hastings
Party	Candidate	Votes	%	±%
Liberal	Briony Hutton	16,415	39.8	−5.0
Labor	Paul Mercurio	15,361	37.3	−1.4
Greens	Paul Saunders	4,118	10.0	−0.2
Animal Justice	Tyson Jack	1,736	4.2	−1.9
Freedom	Janet Felicity Benson	1,235	3.0	+3.0
Family First	Tom Sabo	1,001	2.4	+2.4
Democratic Labour	Camille De Wit	833	2.0	+2.0
Independent	Robert Whitehill	533	1.3	+1.3
Total formal votes		41,232	94.6	+0.2
Informal votes		2,369	5.4	−0.2
Turnout		43,601	89.6	+1.7
Two-party-preferred result
Labor	Paul Mercurio	21,174	51.4	+1.3
Liberal	Briony Hutton	20,058	48.6	−1.3
Labor notional hold		Swing	+1.3	

=== Hawthorn ===
2022 Victorian state election: Hawthorn
Party	Candidate	Votes	%	±%
Liberal	John Pesutto	18,728	42.3	−1.8
Labor	John Kennedy	9,799	22.1	−10.9
Independent	Melissa Lowe	8,851	20.0	+20.0
Greens	Nick Savage	4,927	11.1	−6.4
Animal Justice	Faith Fuhrer	660	1.5	−0.7
Liberal Democrats	Richard Peppard	583	1.3	+1.3
Family First	Ken Triantafillis	408	0.9	+0.9
Democratic Labour	Stratton Bell	354	0.8	+0.8
Total formal votes		44,310	97.4	+1.0
Informal votes		1,178	2.6	−1.0
Turnout		45,488	90.8	+1.2
Two-party-preferred result
Liberal	John Pesutto	22,927	51.7	+2.3
Labor	John Kennedy	21,383	48.3	–2.3
Liberal gain from Labor		Swing	+2.3	

=== Ivanhoe ===
2022 Victorian state election: Ivanhoe
Party	Candidate	Votes	%	±%
Labor	Anthony Carbines	17,333	42.7	−3.7
Liberal	Bernadette Khoury	12,566	31.0	−1.4
Greens	Emily Bieber	7,808	19.2	+4.5
Family First	Sarah Hayward	1,216	3.0	+3.0
Animal Justice	Sonja Ristevski	937	2.3	+2.3
Independent	Craig Langdon	739	1.8	–3.1
Total formal votes		40,599	96.3	+1.1
Informal votes		1,536	3.7	−1.1
Turnout		42,135	89.7	+0.3
Two-party-preferred result
Labor	Anthony Carbines	25,476	62.8	+0.4
Liberal	Bernadette Khoury	15,123	37.2	−0.4
Labor hold		Swing	+0.4	

=== Kalkallo ===
2022 Victorian state election: Kalkallo
Party	Candidate	Votes	%	±%
Labor	Ros Spence	21,531	53.9	−5.7
Liberal	Bikram Singh	9,154	22.9	−2.4
Family First	Das Sayer	2,457	6.1	+6.1
Greens	Muhammad Nisar Ul Murtaza	2,116	5.3	−0.6
Victorian Socialists	Sergio Monsalve Tobon	1,938	4.8	+2.4
Animal Justice	Frances Lowe	1,466	3.7	+3.7
Independent	Jimmy George Parel	610	1.5	+1.5
New Democrats	Smiley Sandhu	409	1.0	+1.0
Independent	Callum John French	299	0.8	+0.8
Total formal votes		39,970	92.0	–0.6
Informal votes		3,504	8.0	+0.6
Turnout		43,474	83.3	+7.2
Two-party-preferred result
Labor	Ros Spence	26,561	66.5	−4.4
Liberal	Bikram Singh	13,409	33.5	+4.4
Labor hold		Swing	−4.4	

=== Kew ===
2022 Victorian state election: Kew
Party	Candidate	Votes	%	±%
Liberal	Jess Wilson	19,321	44.3	−5.0
Labor	Lucy Skelton	9,896	22.7	−8.8
Independent	Sophie Torney	9,200	21.1	+21.1
Greens	Jackie Carter	3,612	8.3	−6.9
Family First	Ann Seeley	751	1.7	+1.7
Animal Justice	Ruby Schofield	507	1.2	−0.9
Independent	Finlay Davis	158	0.4	+0.4
Independent	Kym Sullivan	147	0.3	+0.3
Total formal votes		43,592	97.0	+1.1
Informal votes		1,367	3.0	−1.1
Turnout		44,959	90.1	−2.3
Two-party-preferred result
Liberal	Jess Wilson	23,529	54.0	−0.7
Labor	Lucy Skelton	20,063	46.0	+0.7
Liberal hold		Swing	–0.7	

=== Kororoit ===
2022 Victorian state election: Kororoit
Party	Candidate	Votes	%	±%
Labor	Luba Grigorovitch	17,468	43.3	−20.1
Liberal	John Fletcher	9,801	24.3	+3.5
Victorian Socialists	Belle Gibson	2,768	6.9	+6.9
Greens	Ben Chester	2,650	6.6	−1.7
Democratic Labour	Zuzanna Brown	2,517	6.2	+6.2
Family First	Melanie Milutinovic	2,326	5.8	+5.8
Animal Justice	Katherine Divita	1,242	3.1	−4.5
Independent	Joh Bauch	978	2.4	+2.4
New Democrats	Jaz Chandok	623	1.5	+1.5
Total formal votes		40,373	91.6	–1.2
Informal votes		3,683	8.4	+1.2
Turnout		44,056	86.3	+3.5
Two-party-preferred result
Labor	Luba Grigorovitch	26,047	64.5	−10.8
Liberal	John Fletcher	14,326	35.5	+10.8
Labor hold		Swing	−10.8	

=== Lara ===
2022 Victorian state election: Lara
Party	Candidate	Votes	%	±%
Labor	Ella George	19,635	49.7	−8.2
Liberal	Ralph Krein	8,460	21.4	−2.7
Greens	Courtney Gardner	4,473	11.3	+3.8
Family First	Steve Rankine	1,775	4.5	+4.5
Liberal Democrats	Max Payne	1,688	4.3	+4.3
Animal Justice	Peter Kelly	1,502	3.8	−3.1
Ind. (Socialist Alliance)	Sarah Hathway	1,050	2.6	+2.6
Angry Victorians	Ash Taylor	938	2.4	+2.4
Total formal votes		39,512	93.7	–0.4
Informal votes		2,677	6.3	+0.4
Turnout		42,189	86.2	–1.5
Two-party-preferred result
Labor	Ella George	26,027	65.9	−3.3
Liberal	Ralph Krein	13,485	34.1	+3.3
Labor hold		Swing	−3.3	

=== Laverton ===
2022 Victorian state election: Laverton
Party	Candidate	Votes	%	±%
Labor	Sarah Connolly	17,026	45.9	−11.6
Liberal	Raja Reddy	8,233	22.2	+1.9
Greens	Braishna Durzada	3,496	9.4	−2.5
Victorian Socialists	Catherine Robertson	2,206	5.9	+5.9
Democratic Labour	Michael Wirth	2,051	5.5	+5.5
Family First	David Fry	1,353	3.6	+3.6
New Democrats	Gurneet Soni	1,082	2.9	+2.9
Animal Justice	Pouya Bagheri	694	1.9	−2.0
Freedom	Trent Raymond	641	1.7	+1.7
Independent	Rufo Paredes	355	1.0	+1.0
Total formal votes		37,132	92.2	−1.1
Informal votes		3,149	7.8	+1.1
Turnout		40,281	83.0	+5.8
Two-party-preferred result
Labor	Sarah Connolly	25,393	68.4	−5.0
Liberal	Raja Reddy	11,739	31.6	+5.0
Labor hold		Swing	−5.0	

=== Lowan ===
2022 Victorian state election: Lowan
Party	Candidate	Votes	%	±%
National	Emma Kealy	25,482	59.0	–0.7
Labor	Mick Monaghan	8,454	19.6	−1.8
Greens	Richard Lane	2,575	6.0	+0.6
Independent	Amanda Mead	2,384	5.5	+5.5
Angry Victorians	Richard Etherton	1,710	3.9	+3.9
Family First	Robert Coleman	1,573	3.6	+3.6
Animal Justice	Tamasin Ramsay	1,019	2.4	+2.1
Total formal votes		43,240	94.3	−0.5
Informal votes		2,622	5.7	+0.5
Turnout		45,862	89.7	+1.1
Two-party-preferred result
National	Emma Kealy	30,941	71.6	+0.5
Labor	Mick Monaghan	12,299	28.4	−0.1
National hold		Swing	+0.5	

=== Macedon ===
2022 Victorian state election: Macedon
Party	Candidate	Votes	%	±%
Labor	Mary-Anne Thomas	17,234	41.4	−6.6
Liberal	Dominic Bonanno	12,463	30.0	−1.9
Greens	Marley McRae McLeod	5,214	12.5	+2.6
Independent	Huntly Barton	2,250	5.4	+5.4
One Nation	Amanda Evezard	1,511	3.6	+3.6
Animal Justice	Iris Bergmann	1,356	3.3	−0.7
Family First	Chris McCormack	791	1.9	+1.9
Freedom	Kerryn P. Sedgman	770	1.9	+1.9
Total formal votes		41,589	95.5	+0.2
Informal votes		1,974	4.5	−0.2
Turnout		43,563	90.7	+1.2
Two-party-preferred result
Labor	Mary-Anne Thomas	24,762	59.5	−3.8
Liberal	Dominic Bonanno	16,827	40.5	+3.8
Labor hold		Swing	−3.8	

=== Malvern ===
2022 Victorian state election: Malvern
Party	Candidate	Votes	%	±%
Liberal	Michael O'Brien	20,768	52.8	+1.5
Labor	Darren Natale	10,266	26.1	−3.4
Greens	Mitchell Fuller	6,137	15.6	+2.5
Animal Justice	Amelia Natoli	960	2.5	−0.4
Independent	Steve Stefanopoulos	602	1.5	+1.5
Family First	Judy Schmidt	601	1.5	+1.5
Total formal votes		40,791	97.3	+1.3
Informal votes		1,146	2.7	−1.3
Turnout		41,937	89.5	+0.5
Two-party-preferred result
Liberal	Michael O'Brien	23,685	58.1	+2.0
Labor	Darren Natale	17,106	41.9	−2.0
Liberal hold		Swing	+2.0	

=== Melbourne ===
2022 Victorian state election: Melbourne
Party	Candidate	Votes	%	±%
Greens	Ellen Sandell	15,855	37.3	−1.3
Labor	Rebecca Thistleton	13,033	30.6	−5.1
Liberal	George Palackalody	7,522	17.7	+0.3
Victorian Socialists	Colleen Bolger	2,323	5.5	+5.5
Reason	Nicola Foxworthy	1,601	3.8	0.0
Animal Justice	Rabin Bangaar	701	1.6	−0.3
Family First	Michael Janson	535	1.3	+1.3
Freedom	Steven J. Smith	521	1.2	+1.2
Ind. (Indigenous)	Laylah Al-Saimary	428	1.0	+1.0
Total formal votes		42,519	96.6	+1.3
Informal votes		1,485	3.4	−1.3
Turnout		44,004	80.7	+0.1
Notional two-party-preferred count
Labor	Rebecca Thistleton	31,895	75.0	+0.6
Liberal	George Palackalody	10,624	25.0	−0.6
Two-candidate-preferred result
Greens	Ellen Sandell	25,593	60.2	+8.5
Labor	Rebecca Thistleton	16,926	39.8	−8.5
Greens hold		Swing	+8.5	

=== Melton ===
2022 Victorian state election: Melton
Party	Candidate	Votes	%	±%
Labor	Steve McGhie	14,193	37.7	+3.3
Liberal	Graham Watt	9,155	24.3	+7.9
Independent	Ian Birchall	3,403	9.1	−4.2
Independent	Jarrod James Bingham	2,186	5.8	+0.8
Greens	Praise Morris	1,711	4.6	0.0
Shooters, Fishers, Farmers	Paul Blackborrow	1,682	4.5	+4.5
Democratic Labour	Ashley Alp	1,629	4.3	+1.5
Family First	Richard Brunt	946	2.5	+2.5
Animal Justice	Fiona Adin-James	743	2.0	−0.8
Freedom	Tony Dobran	717	1.9	+1.9
Justice	Samantha Jane Donald	663	1.8	+1.8
New Democrats	Jasleen Kaur	242	0.6	+0.6
Health Australia	Lucienne Ciappara	219	0.6	+0.6
Independent	Jason Spencer Perera	130	0.3	+0.3
Total formal votes		37,619	88.9	–1.1
Informal votes		4,716	11.1	+1.1
Turnout		42,335	84.4	+7.2
Two-party-preferred result
Labor	Steve McGhie	20,538	54.6	−0.4
Liberal	Graham Watt	17,081	45.4	+0.4
Labor hold		Swing	−0.4	

=== Mildura ===
2022 Victorian state election: Mildura
Party	Candidate	Votes	%	±%
Independent	Ali Cupper	12,913	33.9	+2.9
National	Jade Benham	9,868	25.9	−11.4
Liberal	Paul Matheson	7,291	19.1	+16.1
Labor	Stella Zigouras	2,483	6.5	−11.1
Independent	Glenn Milne	1,716	4.5	+4.5
Ind. (Australia One)	Sonia Brymer	1,080	2.8	+2.8
Greens	Katie Clements	894	2.3	−1.4
Democratic Labour	Felicity Sharpe	586	1.5	+1.4
Family First	Brad Stratton	560	1.5	+1.5
Freedom	Philippe John Brougham	416	1.1	+1.1
Animal Justice	Angylina Zayn	333	0.9	+0.8
Total formal votes		38,140	92.5	−2.3
Informal votes		3,096	7.5	+2.3
Turnout		41,236	86.0	−1.9
Notional two-party-preferred count
National	Jade Benham	24,454	64.1	+8.0
Labor	Stella Zigouras	13,686	35.9	−8.0
Two-candidate-preferred result
National	Jade Benham	19,520	51.2	+0.9
Independent	Ali Cupper	18,620	48.8	−0.9
National gain from Independent		Swing	+0.9	

=== Mill Park ===
2022 Victorian state election: Mill Park
Party	Candidate	Votes	%	±%
Labor	Lily D'Ambrosio	18,857	49.9	−12.8
Liberal	Paige Yap	9,797	25.9	+4.6
Greens	Chris Kearney	2,761	7.3	+2.0
Freedom	Andrew Filippopoulos	2,658	7.0	+7.0
Family First	Craig Anderson	1,891	5.0	+5.0
Animal Justice	Marcia Simons	1,833	4.9	−1.9
Total formal votes		37,793	93.8	+0.6
Informal votes		2,515	6.2	−0.5
Turnout		40,308	87.8	−0.8
Two-party-preferred result
Labor	Lily D'Ambrosio	23,274	61.6	–13.3
Liberal	Paige Yap	14,519	38.4	+13.3
Labor hold		Swing	–13.3	

=== Monbulk ===
2022 Victorian state election: Monbulk
Party	Candidate	Votes	%	±%
Labor	Daniela De Martino	15,071	36.1	−6.0
Liberal	Gareth Ward	12,327	29.5	−8.1
Greens	Michael Ormsby	6,255	15.0	−1.2
Independent	Johanna Skelton	2,229	5.3	+5.3
Ind. (Australia One)	Craig Cole	2,069	5.0	+5.0
Animal Justice	Leah Folloni	1,739	4.2	+4.0
Family First	David Higgins	1,197	2.9	+2.9
Freedom	Veronica Barnes	910	2.2	+2.2
Total formal votes		41,797	95.3	+0.3
Informal votes		2,063	4.7	−0.3
Turnout		43,860	90.4	−4.1
Two-party-preferred result
Labor	Daniela De Martino	24,056	57.6	+0.5
Liberal	Gareth Ward	17,741	42.4	–0.5
Labor hold		Swing	+0.5	

=== Mordialloc ===
2022 Victorian state election: Mordialloc
Party	Candidate	Votes	%	±%
Labor	Tim Richardson	19,398	44.0	−6.8
Liberal	Phillip Pease	13,829	31.4	+0.4
Greens	Daniel Lessa	4,526	10.3	+2.7
Independent	Sarah O'Donnell	3,240	7.4	+7.4
Animal Justice	Chi Vo	1,070	2.4	−0.7
Freedom	Deborah Albrecht	955	2.2	+2.2
Family First	Patrick Lum	887	2.0	+2.0
Independent	Phil Reid	154	0.3	+0.3
Total formal votes		44,059	95.6	+1.6
Informal votes		2,035	4.4	−1.6
Turnout		46,094	91.0	+3.5
Two-party-preferred result
Labor	Tim Richardson	25,640	58.2	−5.2
Liberal	Phillip Pease	18,419	41.8	+5.2
Labor hold		Swing	−5.2	

=== Mornington ===
2022 Victorian state election: Mornington
Party	Candidate	Votes	%	±%
Liberal	Chris Crewther	17,910	42.58	−8.01
Independent	Kate Lardner	9,432	22.42	+22.42
Labor	Georgia Fowler	9,246	21.98	−12.30
Greens	Harry Sinclair	2,677	6.38	−3.42
Freedom	Paul Pettitt	1,041	2.47	+2.47
Animal Justice	Leonie Schween	740	1.76	−3.57
Independent	Jane Agirtan	641	1.52	+1.52
Family First	Ross Hayward	375	0.89	+0.89
Total formal votes		42,062	95.85	+0.38
Informal votes		1,823	4.15	−0.38
Turnout		43,885	91.34	−0.64
Notional two-party-preferred count
Liberal	Chris Crewther	24,514	58.28	+3.28
Labor	Georgia Fowler	17,548	41.72	−3.28
Two-candidate-preferred result
Liberal	Chris Crewther	21,326	50.70	−4.30
Independent	Kate Lardner	20,736	49.30	+49.30
Liberal hold		Swing	N/A	

=== Morwell ===
2022 Victorian state election: Morwell
Party	Candidate	Votes	%	±%
Labor	Kate Maxfield	13,601	31.5	−6.8
National	Martin Cameron	9,902	22.9	+14.1
Liberal	Dale Harriman	6,710	15.5	+0.3
One Nation	Allan Hicken	2,648	6.1	+6.1
Independent	Sharon Gibson	2,515	5.8	+5.8
Shooters, Fishers, Farmers	David Snelling	2044	4.7	−1.1
Greens	Rochelle Hine	1,830	4.2	+0.5
Independent	Tracie Lund	1,206	2.8	+1.0
Freedom	Alex Maidana	900	2.1	+2.1
Family First	Brendan Clarke	749	1.7	+1.7
Animal Justice	Jessica McAuliffe	687	1.6	+1.6
Independent	Lisa Proctor	469	1.1	+1.1
Total formal votes		43,261	92.5	+0.1
Informal votes		3,526	7.5	−0.1
Turnout		46,787	87.0	−1.7
Two-party-preferred result
National	Martin Cameron	23,541	54.4	+8.4
Labor	Kate Maxfield	19,720	45.6	−8.4
National notional gain from Labor		Swing	+8.4	

=== Mulgrave ===
2022 Victorian state election: Mulgrave
Party	Candidate	Votes	%	±%
Labor	Daniel Andrews	19,365	51.0	−8.5
Independent	Ian Cook	6,838	18.0	+18.0
Liberal	Michael Piastrino	6,528	17.2	−11.0
Greens	Robert Lim	1,930	5.1	−1.3
Freedom	Aidan McLindon	824	2.2	+2.2
Family First	Jane Foreman	749	2.0	+2.0
Animal Justice	David Mould	419	1.1	+0.9
Democratic Labour	Maree Wood	327	0.9	−1.3
Independent	Fotini Theodossopoulou	305	0.8	+0.8
Independent	Andrew King	173	0.4	+0.4
Ind. (PIBCI)	Joseph Toscano	155	0.4	+0.4
Independent	Anne Moody	146	0.4	+0.4
Independent	Howard Lee	120	0.3	+0.3
Independent	Ezra J. D. Isma	92	0.2	+0.2
Total formal votes		37,924	91.2	−2.7
Informal votes		3,650	8.7	+2.7
Turnout		41,574	88.4	+3.3
Notional two-party-preferred count
Labor	Daniel Andrews	22,976	60.2	−5.6
Liberal	Michael Piastrino	15,191	39.8	+5.6
Two-candidate-preferred result
Labor	Daniel Andrews	23,070	60.8	−5.0
Independent	Ian Cook	14,854	39.2	+39.2
Labor hold		Swing	−5.0	

=== Murray Plains ===
2022 Victorian state election: Murray Plains
Party	Candidate	Votes	%	±%
National	Peter Walsh	24,831	61.8	+1.4
Labor	Damien Hurrell	7,543	18.8	−0.6
Family First	Cameron Macpherson	2,575	6.4	+6.4
Freedom	Katia Bish	1,752	4.4	+4.4
Greens	John Brownstein	1,560	3.9	−0.4
Ind. (Fusion)	Andrea Otto	1,022	2.5	+2.5
Animal Justice	Glenys Leung	908	2.3	+2.3
Total formal votes		40,181	93.8	−0.7
Informal votes		2,647	6.2	+0.7
Turnout		42,828	88.1	−2.4
Two-party-preferred result
National	Peter Walsh	29,483	73.4	−0.5
Labor	Damien Hurrell	10,698	26.6	+0.5
National hold		Swing	−0.5	

=== Narracan ===
The original election on 26 November 2022 for this seat was declared failed due to the death of the National Party candidate on 21 November. The supplementary election was held on 28 January 2023.

Narracan supplementary election: 28 January 2023
Party	Candidate	Votes	%	±%
Liberal	Wayne Farnham	16,741	45.0	−10.6
Greens	Alyssa Weaver	4,132	11.1	+5.1
Independent	Tony Wolfe	4,110	11.0	+11.0
Democratic Labour	Sophia Camille De Wit	2,641	7.1	+7.1
Freedom	Leonie Blackwell	2,254	6.1	+6.1
One Nation	Casey Murphy	2,246	6.0	+6.0
Independent	Annemarie McCabe	1,437	3.9	+3.9
Liberal Democrats	Michael Abelman	1,325	3.6	+3.6
Family First	Brendan Clarke	1,089	2.9	+2.9
Animal Justice	Austin Cram	849	2.3	+2.3
Independent	Ian Honey	381	1.0	+1.0
Total formal votes		37,205	93.4	–1.4
Informal votes		2,619	6.6	+1.4
Turnout		39,824	78.9	−5.9
Two-party-preferred result
Liberal	Wayne Farnham	23,448	63.0	+3.0
Independent	Tony Wolfe	13,757	37.0	+37.0
Liberal hold		Swing	+3.0	

=== Narre Warren North ===
2022 Victorian state election: Narre Warren North
Party	Candidate	Votes	%	±%
Labor	Belinda Wilson	19,350	46.8	−4.4
Liberal	Timothy Dragan	11,291	27.3	−8.1
Greens	Laura McLean	2,809	6.8	+0.6
Family First	Christine Elkins	1,530	3.7	+3.7
Liberal Democrats	Stephen Matulec	1,325	3.2	+3.2
Freedom	Craig Parker	1,218	2.9	+2.9
Democratic Labour	Andrew Zmegac	1,191	2.9	−1.1
Animal Justice	Sheree Gardner	978	2.4	+2.4
Independent	Stephen Capon	906	2.2	+2.2
Shooters, Fishers, Farmers	Monique Ruyter	772	1.9	+1.9
Total formal votes		41,370	92.0	−1.1
Informal votes		3,602	8.0	+1.1
Turnout		44,972	86.7	−1.7
Two-party-preferred result
Labor	Belinda Wilson	24,302	58.7	−1.7
Liberal	Timothy Dragan	17,068	41.3	+1.7
Labor hold		Swing	−1.7	

=== Narre Warren South ===
2022 Victorian state election: Narre Warren South
Party	Candidate	Votes	%	±%
Labor	Gary Maas	20,562	48.0	−4.1
Liberal	Annette Samuel	12,280	28.7	−4.5
Greens	Susanna Moore	2,836	6.6	+0.9
Family First	Jacqueline Harvey	2,495	5.8	+5.8
Freedom	Geoff Hansen	2,136	5.0	+5.0
Liberal Democrats	Christine Skrobo	1,212	2.8	+2.8
Animal Justice	Michael Gallagher	1,048	2.4	+2.4
Independent	Tylere Baker-Pearce	290	0.7	+0.7
Total formal votes		42,859	92.7	–0.2
Informal votes		3,349	7.3	+0.2
Turnout		46,208	86.5	+3.4
Two-party-preferred result
Labor	Gary Maas	24,994	58.3	−2.1
Liberal	Annette Samuel	17,865	41.7	+2.1
Labor hold		Swing	−2.1	

=== Nepean ===
2022 Victorian state election: Nepean
Party	Candidate	Votes	%	±%
Liberal	Sam Groth	19,614	48.1	+4.0
Labor	Chris Brayne	13,308	32.6	−5.3
Greens	Esther Gleixner	3,576	8.8	−2.2
Freedom	Hank Leine	980	2.4	+2.4
Animal Justice	Pamela Engelander	720	1.8	+1.8
Family First	Janny Dijkman	638	1.6	+1.6
Companions and Pets	Jay Miller	526	1.3	+1.3
Independent	Elizabeth Woolcock	495	1.2	+1.2
Independent	Charelle Ainslie	449	1.1	+1.1
Democratic Labour	Cynthia Skruzny	369	0.9	+0.9
Independent	Steve Anger	91	0.2	+0.2
Total formal votes		40,766	93.7	−0.9
Informal votes		2,753	6.3	+0.9
Turnout		43,519	88.9	+3.9
Two-party-preferred result
Liberal	Sam Groth	22,986	56.4	+7.1
Labor	Chris Brayne	17,780	43.6	−7.1
Liberal gain from Labor		Swing	+7.1	

=== Niddrie ===
2022 Victorian state election: Niddrie
Party	Candidate	Votes	%	±%
Labor	Ben Carroll	18,567	43.9	−10.9
Liberal	Alan Youhana	14,344	34.0	−0.3
Greens	Declan McGinness	3,117	7.4	+0.5
Freedom	Frank Maugeri	1,899	4.5	+4.5
Democratic Labour	Holly Kruse	1,172	2.8	+2.8
Family First	Joanne Garcia	1,096	2.6	+2.6
Victorian Socialists	Brad Reich	966	2.3	+2.3
Animal Justice	Shannon Meilak	812	1.9	−1.9
New Democrats	Georgia Grammenos	269	0.6	+0.6
Total formal votes		42,242	93.9	–0.4
Informal votes		2,763	6.1	+0.4
Turnout		45,005	90.0	–0.1
Two-party-preferred result
Labor	Ben Carroll	23,949	56.7	−5.8
Liberal	Alan Youhana	18,293	43.3	+5.8
Labor hold		Swing	−5.8	

=== Northcote ===
2022 Victorian state election: Northcote
Party	Candidate	Votes	%	±%
Labor	Kat Theophanous	17,303	40.6	−1.1
Greens	Campbell Gome	12,797	30.0	−9.5
Liberal	Stewart Todhunter	5,205	12.2	+1.5
Victorian Socialists	Kath Larkin	2,776	6.5	+6.5
Reason	April Clarke	1,539	3.6	+0.2
Animal Justice	Tim Oseckas	757	1.8	−0.7
Freedom	Anastacia Ntouni	729	1.7	+1.7
Liberal Democrats	Anthony Cave	530	1.2	+0.1
Independent	Adrian Whitehead	518	1.2	+1.2
Family First	Kathrine Ashton	408	0.9	+0.9
Independent	Ashish Verma	80	0.2	+0.2
Total formal votes		42,642	94.5	−1.1
Informal votes		2,445	5.4	+1.1
Turnout		45,087	89.5	+0.4
Notional two-party-preferred count
Labor	Kat Theophanous	34,840	81.7	−1.5
Liberal	Stewart Todhunter	7,802	18.3	+1.5
Two-candidate-preferred result
Labor	Kat Theophanous	21,413	50.2	−1.5
Greens	Campbell Gome	21,229	49.8	+1.5
Labor hold		Swing	−1.5	

=== Oakleigh ===
2022 Victorian state election: Oakleigh
Party	Candidate	Votes	%	±%
Labor	Steve Dimopoulos	19,778	45.0	−8.3
Liberal	Jim Grivokostopoulos	12,848	29.3	−0.5
Greens	Hsiang-Han Hsieh	7,278	16.6	+5.2
Ind. (Australia One)	Dominique Murphy	1,084	2.5	+2.5
Animal Justice	Loraine Fabb	1,014	2.3	+0.3
Family First	Edward Sok	904	2.1	+2.1
Freedom	Anthony Charles Jacobs	770	1.7	+1.7
Independent	Parashos Kioupelis	234	0.5	+0.5
Total formal votes		43,910	95.6	+0.4
Informal votes		2,000	4.4	−0.4
Turnout		45,910	88.4	+0.6
Two-party-preferred result
Labor	Steve Dimopoulos	27,876	63.5	−2.6
Liberal	Jim Grivokostopoulos	16,034	36.5	+2.6
Labor hold		Swing	−2.6	

=== Ovens Valley ===
2022 Victorian state election: Ovens Valley
Party	Candidate	Votes	%	±%
National	Tim McCurdy	21,057	52.1	+10.4
Labor	Zuvele Leschen	8,369	20.7	+0.0
Greens	Zoe Kromar	3,625	9.0	+4.3
Liberal Democrats	Julian Fidge	2,995	7.4	+7.4
Freedom	Mark Bugge	1,932	4.8	+4.8
Family First	Anna Wise	1,403	3.5	+3.5
Animal Justice	Aisha Slater	1,009	2.5	+2.5
Total formal votes		40,382	95.1	+0.4
Informal votes		2,114	4.9	−0.4
Turnout		42,496	88.3	−2.1
Two-party-preferred result
National	Tim McCurdy	27,395	67.8	+5.7
Labor	Zuvele Leschen	12,987	32.2	−5.7
National hold		Swing	+5.7	

=== Pakenham ===
2022 Victorian state election: Pakenham
Party	Candidate	Votes	%	±%
Labor	Emma Vulin	13,151	33.8	−11.5
Liberal	David Farrelly	12,605	32.4	−9.8
Independent	Brett Owen	3,157	8.1	+8.1
Greens	Michelle Maibaum	2,571	6.6	−0.8
Legalise Cannabis	Elissa Smith	2,010	5.2	+5.2
One Nation	Angela Siladji	1,321	3.4	+3.4
Family First	Christopher Gore	1,218	3.1	+3.1
Animal Justice	Hannah Pledger-Firth	978	2.5	+2.5
Freedom	Sammi Clarke	956	2.5	+2.5
Democratic Labour	Sarasadat Sarkeshik	666	1.7	+0.1
Independent	Rajvir Singh Sagoo	234	0.6	+0.6
Total formal votes		38,867	92.6	−1.1
Informal votes		3.089	7.4	+1.1
Turnout		41,956	87.4	+14.9
Two-party-preferred result
Labor	Emma Vulin	19,587	50.4	−1.8
Liberal	David Farrelly	19,280	49.6	+1.8
Labor hold		Swing	–1.8	

=== Pascoe Vale ===
2022 Victorian state election: Pascoe Vale
Party	Candidate	Votes	%	±%
Labor	Anthony Cianflone	15,611	38.8	+0.5
Greens	Angelica Panopoulos	9,034	22.4	+1.9
Liberal	Tom Wright	8,461	21.0	+9.4
Victorian Socialists	Madaleine Hah	2,228	5.5	+3.2
Ind. (Socialist Alliance)	Sue Bolton	1,689	4.2	+4.2
Reason	Margee Glover	1,281	3.2	+1.9
Family First	Richard Cimbaro	1,080	2.7	+2.7
Animal Justice	Elizabeth Adams	889	2.2	+0.1
Total formal votes		40,273	94.7	+1.6
Informal votes		2,249	5.3	−1.6
Turnout		42,522	87.5	+2.5
Notional two-party-preferred count
Labor	Anthony Cianflone	29,096	72.2	+0.0
Liberal	Tom Wright	11,177	27.8	−0.0
Two-candidate-preferred result
Labor	Anthony Cianflone	20,950	52.0	−20.2
Greens	Angelica Panopoulos	19,323	48.0	+48.0
Labor hold		Swing	N/A	

=== Point Cook ===
2022 Victorian state election: Point Cook
Party	Candidate	Votes	%	±%
Labor	Mathew Hilakari	15,657	40.0	−9.5
Liberal	Angela Newhouse	9,651	24.7	+0.5
Independent	Joe Garra	2,717	6.9	+6.9
Greens	Shamsher Khan	2,656	6.8	−1.1
Family First	Carolyn Cronkwright	1,496	3.8	+3.8
Victorian Socialists	Alex McAulay	1,399	3.6	+3.6
Democratic Labour	Daniel Hamman	1,369	3.5	+3.5
Independent	Larry Zhao	814	2.1	+2.1
Animal Justice	Terri Beech	804	2.1	+2.1
Freedom	Adrian Abdulovski	571	1.5	+1.5
Justice	Scott Grimley	514	1.3	+1.3
Independent	Shwetali Sawant	467	1.2	+1.2
Health Australia	Emma Law	383	1.0	+0.9
New Democrats	Rakhi P. Chaudhary	358	0.9	+0.9
Transport Matters	Lisa Jane Gatti	245	0.6	+0.6
Total formal votes		39,099	89.8	−4.8
Informal votes		4,448	10.2	+4.8
Turnout		43,547	87.5	+2.7
Two-party-preferred result
Labor	Mathew Hilakari	22,810	58.3	−4.4
Liberal	Angela Newhouse	16,289	41.7	+4.4
Labor hold		Swing	−4.4	

=== Polwarth ===
2022 Victorian state election: Polwarth
Party	Candidate	Votes	%	±%
Liberal	Richard Riordan	19,540	42.5	−3.3
Labor	Hutch Hussein	13,484	29.3	−1.4
Greens	Hilary McAllister	7,661	16.7	+6.0
Ind. (Australia One)	Denes C. Borsos	2,017	4.4	+4.4
Family First	Hollie Hunter	1,166	2.5	+2.5
Animal Justice	Elisha Atchison	1,101	2.4	−1.3
Justice	Joseph Vincent Remenyi	1,033	2.3	+2.3
Total formal votes		46,002	95.8	+0.7
Informal votes		1,949	4.1	−0.7
Turnout		47,951	90.4	+8.3
Two-party-preferred result
Liberal	Richard Riordan	23,823	51.8	−0.2
Labor	Hutch Hussein	22,179	48.2	+0.2
Liberal hold		Swing	−0.2	

=== Prahran ===
2022 Victorian state election: Prahran
Party	Candidate	Votes	%	±%
Greens	Sam Hibbins	14,286	36.4	+8.1
Liberal	Matthew Lucas	12,198	31.1	−1.6
Labor	Wesa Chau	10,421	26.6	−3.9
Animal Justice	Alice Le Huray	1,263	3.2	+0.9
Family First	Ronald Emilsen	626	1.6	+1.6
Independent	Alan Menadue	449	1.1	+0.8
Total formal votes		39,243	97.0	+2.1
Informal votes		1,223	3.0	−2.1
Turnout		40,466	82.7	−1.6
Notional two-party-preferred count
Labor	Wesa Chau	23,966	61.1	+2.4
Liberal	Matthew Lucas	15,277	38.9	–2.4
Two-candidate-preferred result
Greens	Sam Hibbins	24,334	62.0	+3.0
Liberal	Matthew Lucas	14,909	38.0	−3.0
Greens hold		Swing	+3.0	

=== Preston ===
2022 Victorian state election: Preston
Party	Candidate	Votes	%	±%
Labor	Nathan Lambert	14,999	37.6	−14.7
Liberal	Amanda Paliouras	6,883	17.3	+0.6
Greens	Patchouli Paterson	6,027	15.1	+0.5
Independent	Gaetano Greco	5,473	13.7	+7.2
Victorian Socialists	Steph Price	2,458	6.2	+2.4
Freedom	Angelique Matias	1,150	2.9	+2.9
Reason	Carmen Lahiff-Jenkins	890	2.2	−0.7
Family First	Raouf Soliman	885	2.2	+2.2
Animal Justice	Rachel Unicomb	822	2.1	−0.8
Independent	Brian Sanaghan	270	0.7	+0.7
Total formal votes		39,857	92.2	−0.5
Informal votes		3,392	7.8	+0.5
Turnout		43,249	85.9	+0.3
Notional two-party-preferred count
Labor	Nathan Lambert	27,769	69.7	–8.6
Liberal	Amanda Paliouras	12,088	30.3	+8.6
Two-candidate-preferred result
Labor	Nathan Lambert	20,761	52.1	−19.2
Greens	Patchouli Paterson	19,096	47.9	+19.2
Labor hold		Swing	–19.2	

=== Richmond ===
2022 Victorian state election: Richmond
Party	Candidate	Votes	%	±%
Greens	Gabrielle de Vietri	13,771	34.7	+1.2
Labor	Lauren O'Dwyer	13,037	32.8	−11.6
Liberal	Lucas Moon	7,456	18.8	+18.8
Reason	Jeremy Cowen	1,830	4.6	−2.0
Victorian Socialists	Roz Ward	1,828	4.6	+4.6
Animal Justice	Lis Viggers	934	2.3	−0.5
Family First	Markus Freiverts	458	1.2	+1.2
Independent	Meca Ho	417	1.0	+1.0
Total formal votes		39,731	96.6	+2.5
Informal votes		1,381	3.4	−2.5
Turnout		41,112	85.1	−0.4
Notional two-party-preferred count
Labor	Lauren O'Dwyer	29,451	74.1	−7.1
Liberal	Lucas Moon	10,280	25.9	+7.1
Two-candidate-preferred result
Greens	Gabrielle de Vietri	22,771	57.2	+14.1
Labor	Lauren O'Dwyer	17,012	42.8	−14.1
Greens gain from Labor		Swing	+14.1	

=== Ringwood ===
2022 Victorian state election: Ringwood
Party	Candidate	Votes	%	±%
Labor	Will Fowles	17,851	39.0	−3.3
Liberal	Cynthia Watson	15,467	33.8	−9.9
Greens	Reuben Steen	7,105	15.5	+2.1
Democratic Labour	Gary Ryan	1,684	3.7	+3.7
Family First	Richard Griffith-Jones	1,396	3.1	+3.1
Animal Justice	Nick Rowe	1,212	2.6	+2.2
Freedom	Robyn M. Siemer	1,038	2.3	+2.3
Total formal votes		45,753	96.5	+1.7
Informal votes		1,676	3.5	−1.7
Turnout		47,429	91.1	−0.2
Two-party-preferred result
Labor	Will Fowles	26,322	57.5	+4.3
Liberal	Cynthia Watson	19,431	42.5	−4.3
Labor hold		Swing	+4.3	

=== Ripon ===
2022 Victorian state election: Ripon
Party	Candidate	Votes	%	±%
Labor	Martha Haylett	16,321	38.5	−2.5
Liberal	Louise Staley	15,305	36.2	–0.6
Shooters, Fishers, Farmers	Luke Smith	3,606	8.5	+3.1
Greens	Earl James	2,524	6.0	+1.3
Family First	Craig George	1,316	3.1	+3.1
Animal Justice	Holly Sitters	1,145	2.7	+0.3
Justice	Wren Louise Wilson	940	2.2	−1.8
Independent	Wayne Rigg	872	2.1	+2.1
Independent	Bernard Quince	312	0.7	+0.7
Total formal votes		42,341	93.2	+1.4
Informal votes		3,111	6.8	−1.4
Turnout		45,452	89.5	−3.7
Two-party-preferred result
Labor	Martha Haylett	22,438	53.0	+0.2
Liberal	Louise Staley	19,903	47.0	–0.2
Labor notional hold		Swing	+0.2	

=== Rowville ===
2022 Victorian state election: Rowville
Party	Candidate	Votes	%	±%
Liberal	Kim Wells	17,600	40.6	−10.3
Labor	Mannie Kaur Verma	14,283	32.9	−2.8
Independent	Nicole Seymour	5,231	12.1	+12.1
Greens	Angelica Di Camillo	3,055	7.0	−2.4
Family First	Stephen Burgess	1,433	3.3	+3.3
Freedom	Peterine Elizabeth Smulders	908	2.1	+2.1
Animal Justice	Diane Glenane	859	2.0	+2.0
Total formal votes		43,369	95.4	+1.3
Informal votes		2,070	4.6	−1.3
Turnout		45,439	91.4	−1.2
Two-party-preferred result
Liberal	Kim Wells	23,274	53.7	−1.8
Labor	Mannie Kaur Verma	20,095	46.3	+1.8
Liberal hold		Swing	−1.8	

=== Sandringham ===
2022 Victorian state election: Sandringham
Party	Candidate	Votes	%	±%
Liberal	Brad Rowswell	18,783	46.4	+3.8
Labor	Bettina Prescott	10,426	25.7	−7.4
Greens	Alysia Regan	5,949	14.7	+6.5
Independent	Clarke Martin	2,800	6.9	−1.6
Animal Justice	Barbara Eppingstall	976	2.4	−0.8
Democratic Labour	Karla Zmegac	749	1.9	−1.0
Family First	Jill Chalmers	714	1.8	+1.8
Independent	Rodney Campbell	115	0.3	+0.3
Total formal votes		40,510	96.0	+0.8
Informal votes		1,701	4.0	−0.8
Turnout		42,211	91.2	+2.2
Two-party-preferred result
Liberal	Brad Rowswell	22,294	55.0	+4.6
Labor	Bettina Prescott	18,216	45.0	−4.6
Liberal hold		Swing	+4.6	

=== Shepparton ===
2022 Victorian state election: Shepparton
Party	Candidate	Votes	%	±%
National	Kim O'Keeffe	13,242	32.06	+19.03
Independent	Suzanna Sheed	12,146	29.41	−8.99
Liberal	Cheryl Hammer	8,491	20.56	−6.00
Labor	Liam Cowan	3,285	7.95	−3.61
Greens	Ian Christoe	1,056	2.56	+0.14
Democratic Labour	Sueie McGrath	882	2.14	+2.14
Family First	Alison White	877	2.12	+2.12
Freedom	Diane M. Teasdale	807	1.95	+1.95
Animal Justice	Katherine Taylor	515	1.25	+1.25
Total formal votes		41,301	93.94	−0.58
Informal votes		2,663	6.06	+0.58
Turnout		43,964	86.21	−3.37
Notional two-party-preferred count
National	Kim O'Keeffe	30,704	74.34	+12.62
Labor	Liam Cowan	10,597	25.66	−12.62
Two-candidate-preferred result
National	Kim O'Keeffe	23,455	56.79	+12.09
Independent	Suzanna Sheed	17,846	43.21	−12.09
National gain from Independent		Swing	N/A	

=== South Barwon ===
2022 Victorian state election: South Barwon
Party	Candidate	Votes	%	±%
Labor	Darren Cheeseman	19,969	44.2	+5.6
Liberal	Andrew Katos	14,516	32.1	−6.5
Greens	Genevieve Frances Dawson-Scott	5,719	12.6	+4.2
Family First	Alan Barron	1,338	3.0	+3.0
Democratic Labour	Leone Bates	1,099	2.4	−0.6
Animal Justice	Naomi Adams	1,076	2.4	−0.7
Justice	Jeynelle Marie Dean	891	2.0	+2.0
Freedom	Simone Tomlinson	576	1.3	+1.3
Total formal votes		45,184	96.5	+1.0
Informal votes		1,637	3.5	−1.0
Turnout		46,821	90.8	+1.9
Two-party-preferred result
Labor	Darren Cheeseman	27,020	59.8	+6.8
Liberal	Andrew Katos	18,164	40.2	−6.8
Labor hold		Swing	+6.8	

=== South-West Coast ===
2022 Victorian state election: South-West Coast
Party	Candidate	Votes	%	±%
Liberal	Roma Britnell	19,517	42.9	+8.5
Labor	Kylie Gaston	9,640	21.2	−3.4
Independent	Carol Altmann	6,564	14.4	+14.4
Independent	James Purcell	2,737	6.0	–9.4
Greens	Thomas Campbell	2,457	5.4	−0.8
Independent	Jim Doukas	1,865	4.1	+4.1
Family First	Chris Brunt	924	2.0	+2.0
Animal Justice	Jacinta Anderson	688	1.5	+1.3
Independent	Michael McCluskey	616	1.4	+0.5
Justice	James Brash Grimley	488	1.1	+1.1
Total formal votes		45,496	94.3	+0.9
Informal votes		2,723	5.7	−0.9
Turnout		48,219	90.8	+0.3
Two-party-preferred result
Liberal	Roma Britnell	26,410	58.0	+4.8
Labor	Kylie Gaston	19,086	42.0	−4.8
Liberal hold		Swing	+4.8	

=== St Albans ===
2022 Victorian state election: St Albans
Party	Candidate	Votes	%	±%
Labor	Natalie Suleyman	15,094	42.3	−18.4
Liberal	Maria Kerr	9,066	25.4	+1.4
Democratic Labour	Mark Hobart	2,735	7.7	+7.7
Greens	Joel Bentley	2,416	6.8	−4.5
Victorian Socialists	Van Thanh Rudd	2,367	6.6	+6.6
Independent	Virginia Tachos	1,152	3.2	+3.2
Family First	Russell Walton	1,038	2.9	+2.9
Freedom	Kim J. Cullen	874	2.4	+2.4
Animal Justice	Jason Caracassis	782	2.2	+1.2
New Democrats	Zaffer Mannan	192	0.5	+0.5
Total formal votes		35,716	90.8	−1.9
Informal votes		3,638	9.2	+1.9
Turnout		39,354	84.7	−1.6
Two-party-preferred result
Labor	Natalie Suleyman	21,274	59.6	−12.4
Liberal	Maria Kerr	14,442	40.4	+12.4
Labor hold		Swing	−12.4	

=== Sunbury ===
2022 Victorian state election: Sunbury
Party	Candidate	Votes	%	±%
Labor	Josh Bull	16,253	43.1	−15.5
Liberal	Simmone Cottom	11,895	31.6	−2.1
Greens	Richard Burke	2,459	6.5	−1.2
Animal Justice	Rohanna Mohr	1,537	4.1	+4.1
Family First	Charles Pace	1,445	3.8	+3.8
Independent	Laurence Pincini	1,432	3.8	+3.8
Democratic Labour	Peter Bayliss	1,317	3.5	+3.5
Victorian Socialists	James Gallagher	1,164	3.1	+3.1
New Democrats	Rushi Vijaykumar Patel	204	0.5	+0.5
Total formal votes		37,706	93.5	–0.5
Informal votes		2,620	6.5	+0.5
Turnout		40,326	88.5	+0.8
Two-party-preferred result
Labor	Josh Bull	21,271	56.4	−8.1
Liberal	Simmone Cottom	16,435	43.6	+8.1
Labor hold		Swing	−8.1	

=== Sydenham ===
2022 Victorian state election: Sydenham
Party	Candidate	Votes	%	±%
Labor	Natalie Hutchins	18,978	43.5	−17.8
Liberal	Joseph Cullia	12,661	29.0	+0.9
Family First	Marvet Tawadros	2,818	6.5	+6.5
Greens	Maggie Ralph	2,547	5.8	−0.6
Victorian Socialists	Hajar Chlihi	1,977	4.5	+4.5
Democratic Labour	Jakueline Radovani	1,916	4.4	+4.4
Freedom	Alejandro Ramos	1,672	3.8	+3.8
Animal Justice	Karina Leung	1,095	2.5	+2.5
Total formal votes		43,662	92.4	–0.5
Informal votes		3,594	7.6	+0.5
Turnout		47,256	89.0	+1.9
Two-party-preferred result
Labor	Natalie Hutchins	25,657	58.8	−8.9
Liberal	Joseph Cullia	18,005	41.2	+8.9
Labor hold		Swing	−8.9	

=== Tarneit ===
2022 Victorian state election: Tarneit
Party	Candidate	Votes	%	±%
Labor	Dylan Wight	18,173	46.6	−9.8
Liberal	Preet Singh	10,438	26.8	+0.9
Greens	Clare Miller	2,883	7.4	−0.3
Victorian Socialists	Claudio Uribe	2,072	5.3	+5.3
Family First	Thomas Jeffrey	1,977	5.1	+5.1
New Democrats	Jaydeep Patel	1,176	3.0	+3.0
Freedom	Erum Maqsood	882	2.3	+2.3
Animal Justice	Maurita Rahn	843	2.2	+2.2
Ind. (United People's)	Aijaz Moinuddin	534	1.4	+1.4
Total formal votes		38,977	93.0	+0.2
Informal votes		2,947	7.0	−0.2
Turnout		41,924	85.9	+0.4
Two-party-preferred result
Labor	Dylan Wight	24,276	62.3	−5.6
Liberal	Preet Singh	14,701	37.7	+5.6
Labor hold		Swing	−5.6	

=== Thomastown ===
2022 Victorian state election: Thomastown
Party	Candidate	Votes	%	±%
Labor	Bronwyn Halfpenny	19,396	51.7	−10.1
Liberal	Gurdawar Singh	9,003	24.0	+8.8
Victorian Socialists	Kelly Cvetkova	2,873	7.7	+4.8
Family First	Colleen McNamara	2,571	6.9	+6.9
Greens	Matt Sinapi	2,557	6.8	+2.7
Animal Justice	Evie Levens	1,076	2.9	+0.4
Total formal votes		37,429	92.2	+4.2
Informal votes		3,151	7.8	−4.2
Turnout		40,580	85.2	+1.6
Two-party-preferred result
Labor	Bronwyn Halfpenny	24,628	65.8	−11.6
Liberal	Gurdawar Singh	12,801	34.2	+11.6
Labor hold		Swing	−11.6	

=== Warrandyte ===
2022 Victorian state election: Warrandyte
Party	Candidate	Votes	%	±%
Liberal	Ryan Smith	21,344	47.3	−2.8
Labor	Naomi Oakley	14,946	33.2	−2.3
Greens	Deepak Joshi	5,283	11.7	+1.1
Family First	Richard Vernay	1,823	4.0	+4.0
Animal Justice	Nicola Rae	1,020	2.3	−1.5
Independent	Cynthia Pilli	659	1.5	+1.5
Total formal votes		45,075	96.6	+1.5
Informal votes		1,582	3.4	−1.5
Turnout		46,657	91.6	+1.1
Two-party-preferred result
Liberal	Ryan Smith	24,482	54.3	+0.5
Labor	Naomi Oakley	20,593	45.7	−0.5
Liberal hold		Swing	+0.5	

=== Wendouree ===
2022 Victorian state election: Wendouree
Party	Candidate	Votes	%	±%
Labor	Juliana Addison	20,059	47.6	−3.1
Liberal	Samantha McIntosh	12,548	29.7	−4.1
Greens	Ellen Burns	4,386	10.4	+1.4
Family First	Ian Harkness	1,616	3.8	+3.8
Animal Justice	Bryn Hills	1,602	3.8	+0.2
Democratic Labour	Dianne Colbert	1,509	3.6	+3.6
Independent	Bren Eckel	455	1.1	+0.9
Total formal votes		42,172	95.2	+0.5
Informal votes		2,399	5.4	−0.5
Turnout		44,571	88.3	+1.8
Two-party-preferred result
Labor	Juliana Addison	26,109	61.9	+0.9
Liberal	Samantha McIntosh	16,063	38.1	−0.9
Labor hold		Swing	+0.9	

=== Werribee ===
2022 Victorian state election: Werribee
Party	Candidate	Votes	%	±%
Labor	Tim Pallas	17,512	45.4	−0.6
Liberal	Mia Shaw	9,779	25.3	+8.7
Greens	Jack Boddeke	2,613	6.8	+0.3
Independent	Paul Hopper	2,278	5.9	+5.9
Victorian Socialists	Sue Munro	1,391	3.6	+3.6
Family First	Matthew Emerson	964	2.5	+2.5
Democratic Labour	Kathryn Breakwell	767	2.0	−1.2
Animal Justice	Josh Segrave	730	1.9	+1.9
Justice	Patricia Anne Wicks	709	1.8	+1.8
Freedom	Mark Strother	663	1.7	+1.7
Transport Matters	Trevor Russell Collins	360	0.9	+0.9
New Democrats	Prashant Tandon	319	0.8	+0.8
Health Australia	Karen Hogan	260	0.7	+0.7
Independent	Patrizia Barcatta	213	0.6	+0.6
Independent	Heni Cazlynn Kwan	45	0.1	+0.1
Total formal votes		38,603	90.3	−2.9
Informal votes		4,156	9.7	+2.9
Turnout		42,759	85.6	+4.5
Two-party-preferred result
Labor	Tim Pallas	23,517	60.9	−2.4
Liberal	Mia Shaw	15,086	39.1	+2.4
Labor hold		Swing	−2.4	

=== Williamstown ===
2022 Victorian state election: Williamstown
Party	Candidate	Votes	%	±%
Labor	Melissa Horne	16,173	41.5	−8.2
Liberal	Daria Kellander	10,928	28.0	+7.7
Greens	Suzette Rodoreda	6,013	15.4	+2.1
Democratic Labour	Rochelle Fisher	1,632	4.2	+4.2
Victorian Socialists	Julien Q. Macandili	1,528	3.9	+3.9
Animal Justice	Patricia Mackevicius	1,049	2.7	+0.5
Freedom	Alexander Ansalone	976	2.5	+2.5
Family First	Joshua Mosely	675	1.7	+1.7
Total formal votes		38,974	95.4	+0.3
Informal votes		1,878	4.6	−0.3
Turnout		40,852	88.9	+2.7
Two-party-preferred result
Labor	Melissa Horne	24,726	63.4	−6.5
Liberal	Daria Kellander	14,248	36.6	+6.5
Labor hold		Swing	−6.5	

=== Yan Yean ===
2022 Victorian state election: Yan Yean
Party	Candidate	Votes	%	±%
Labor	Lauren Kathage	16,328	41.4	−14.5
Liberal	Richard Welch	13,361	33.9	+6.2
Greens	Samantha Mason	2,537	6.4	+1.1
Democratic Labour	Jack Wooldridge	2,028	5.1	+1.6
Family First	James Hall	1,284	3.3	+3.3
Animal Justice	Ruth Parramore	1,043	2.7	+2.4
Shooters, Fishers, Farmers	Alexandar Krstic	1,024	2.6	−1.1
Freedom	Con Bouroutzis	1,021	2.6	+2.6
Justice	Mandy Anne Grimley	793	2.0	+2.0
Total formal votes		39,415	94.1	+1.4
Informal votes		2,475	5.9	−1.4
Turnout		41,890	88.5	+8.7
Two-party-preferred result
Labor	Lauren Kathage	21,390	54.3	−12.7
Liberal	Richard Welch	18,025	45.7	+12.7
Labor hold		Swing	−12.7	
