= Electoral results for the district of Pascoe Vale =

Victoria, Australia, district election results

This is a list of electoral results for the Electoral district of Pascoe Vale in Victorian state elections.

== Members for Pascoe Vale ==
First incarnation (1955–1958)
Member	Party	Term
Arthur Drakeford Jr	Labor	1955–1958
Second incarnation (1985–present)
Member	Party	Term
Tom Edmunds	Labor	1985–1988
Kelvin Thomson	Labor	1988–1996
Christine Campbell	Labor	1996–2014
Lizzie Blandthorn	Labor	2014–2022
Anthony Cianflone	Labor	2022–present

== Election results ==
=== Elections in the 2020s ===
2022 Victorian state election: Pascoe Vale
Party	Candidate	Votes	%	±%
Labor	Anthony Cianflone	15,611	38.8	+0.5
Greens	Angelica Panopoulos	9,034	22.4	+1.9
Liberal	Tom Wright	8,461	21.0	+9.4
Victorian Socialists	Madaleine Hah	2,228	5.5	+3.2
Independent Socialist Alliance	Sue Bolton	1,689	4.2	+4.2
Reason	Margee Glover	1,281	3.2	+1.9
Family First	Richard Cimbaro	1,080	2.7	+2.7
Animal Justice	Elizabeth Adams	889	2.2	+0.1
Total formal votes		40,273	94.7	+1.6
Informal votes		2,249	5.3	−1.6
Turnout		42,522	87.5	+2.5
Notional two-party-preferred count
Labor	Anthony Cianflone	29,096	72.3	+0.2
Liberal	Tom Wright	11,177	27.7	−0.2
Two-candidate-preferred result
Labor	Anthony Cianflone	20,950	52.0	−19.1
Greens	Angelica Panopoulos	19,323	48.0	+48.0
Labor hold		Swing	N/A	

=== Elections in the 2010s ===
2018 Victorian state election: Pascoe Vale
Party	Candidate	Votes	%	±%
Labor	Lizzie Blandthorn	15,904	37.74	−9.96
Independent	Oscar Yildiz	9,908	23.51	+23.51
Greens	Phil Jackson	5,451	12.94	−3.34
Liberal	Genevieve Hamilton	4,812	11.42	−15.18
Independent	John Kavanagh	3,242	7.69	+7.69
Victorian Socialists	Gerry Beaton	1,277	3.03	−0.19
Animal Justice	Graeme Linsell	839	1.99	+1.99
Independent	Francesco Timpano	707	1.68	−1.62
Total formal votes		42,140	92.90	−0.73
Informal votes		3,220	7.10	+0.73
Turnout		45,360	88.66	−2.49
Notional two-party-preferred count
Labor	Lizzie Blandthorn	28,790	68.32	+1.55
Liberal	Genevieve Hamilton	13,350	31.68	−1.55
Two-candidate-preferred result
Labor	Lizzie Blandthorn	24,684	58.58	−8.20
Independent	Oscar Yildiz	17,456	41.42	+41.42
Labor hold		Swing	N/A	

2014 Victorian state election: Pascoe Vale
Party	Candidate	Votes	%	±%
Labor	Lizzie Blandthorn	18,679	47.7	−6.9
Liberal	Jacqueline Khoo	10,416	26.6	−0.7
Greens	Liam Farrelly	6,372	16.3	+0.4
Independent	Francesco Timpano	1,282	3.3	+3.3
Socialist Alliance	Sean Brocklehurst	1,260	3.2	+3.2
Family First	Thomas Ha	1,148	2.9	+2.9
Total formal votes		39,157	93.6	−0.1
Informal votes		2,663	6.4	+0.1
Turnout		41,820	91.2	+1.4
Two-party-preferred result
Labor	Lizzie Blandthorn	26,240	66.8	−1.7
Liberal	Jacqueline Khoo	13,060	33.2	+1.7
Labor hold		Swing	−1.7	

2010 Victorian state election: Pascoe Vale
Party	Candidate	Votes	%	±%
Labor	Christine Campbell	18,795	53.73	−6.53
Liberal	Claude Tomisich	9,823	28.08	+4.63
Greens	Liam Farrelly	5,683	16.25	+4.03
Independent	Alf Hickey	679	1.94	+1.94
Total formal votes		34,980	94.01	+0.50
Informal votes		2,227	5.99	−0.50
Turnout		37,207	91.28	+0.53
Two-party-preferred result
Labor	Christine Campbell	23,738	67.80	−4.98
Liberal	Claude Tomisich	11,272	32.20	+4.98
Labor hold		Swing	−4.98	

=== Elections in the 2000s ===
2006 Victorian state election: Pascoe Vale
Party	Candidate	Votes	%	±%
Labor	Christine Campbell	19,733	60.3	−6.7
Liberal	Claude Tomisich	7,679	23.4	+0.9
Greens	David Collis	4,003	12.2	+3.4
Family First	Stefan Pittari	1,104	3.4	+3.4
Citizens Electoral Council	Noelene Isherwood	229	0.7	−0.9
Total formal votes		32,748	93.5	−1.7
Informal votes		2,272	6.5	+1.7
Turnout		35,020	90.7	
Two-party-preferred result
Labor	Christine Campbell	23,828	72.8	−1.4
Liberal	Claude Tomisisch	8,912	27.2	+1.4
Labor hold		Swing	−1.4	

2002 Victorian state election: Pascoe Vale
Party	Candidate	Votes	%	±%
Labor	Christine Campbell	21,989	67.0	+1.5
Liberal	Steve Clancy	7,400	22.5	−10.0
Greens	Peter Elgood	2,905	8.8	+7.2
Citizens Electoral Council	Craig Isherwood	538	1.6	+1.6
Total formal votes		32,832	95.2	−0.8
Informal votes		1,665	4.8	+0.8
Turnout		34,497	91.7	
Two-party-preferred result
Labor	Christine Campbell	24,359	74.2	+7.3
Liberal	Steve Clancy	8,468	25.8	−7.3
Labor hold		Swing	+7.3	

=== Elections in the 1990s ===
1999 Victorian state election: Pascoe Vale
Party	Candidate	Votes	%	±%
Labor	Christine Campbell	17,725	64.9	+4.9
Liberal	Valentine Aghajani	9,569	35.1	−2.9
Total formal votes		27,294	96.1	−0.9
Informal votes		1,098	3.9	+0.9
Turnout		28,392	91.5	
Labor hold		Swing	+3.8	

1996 Victorian state election: Pascoe Vale
Party	Candidate	Votes	%	±%
Labor	Christine Campbell	16,672	60.0	+8.3
Liberal	Ross Lazzaro	10,544	38.0	+0.5
Natural Law	Gerard Sanders	562	2.0	+2.0
Total formal votes		27,778	97.1	+1.3
Informal votes		844	2.9	−1.3
Turnout		28,622	92.8	
Two-party-preferred result
Labor	Christine Campbell	16,954	61.1	+3.1
Liberal	Ross Lazzaro	10,810	38.9	−3.1
Labor hold		Swing	+3.1	

1992 Victorian state election: Pascoe Vale
Party	Candidate	Votes	%	±%
Labor	Kelvin Thomson	14,332	51.7	−2.2
Liberal	Con Karavitis	10,374	37.4	+6.7
Independent	Cath Price	1,979	7.1	+0.7
Independent	Anne Petrou	1,031	3.7	+3.7
Total formal votes		27,716	95.8	+0.4
Informal votes		1,224	4.2	−0.4
Turnout		28,940	93.7	
Two-party-preferred result
Labor	Kelvin Thomson	16,054	58.0	−0.1
Liberal	Con Karavitis	11,605	42.0	+0.1
Labor hold		Swing	−0.1	

=== Elections in the 1980s ===
1988 Victorian state election: Pascoe Vale
Party	Candidate	Votes	%	±%
Labor	Kelvin Thomson	12,846	50.64	−10.71
Liberal	Geoff Lutz	9,013	35.53	−3.12
Independent	Cath Price	2,251	8.87	+8.87
Democratic Labor	Mark Beshara	1,255	4.95	+4.95
Total formal votes		25,365	96.08	−0.36
Informal votes		1,035	3.92	+0.36
Turnout		26,400	92.10	−2.16
Two-party-preferred result
Labor	Kelvin Thomson	13,803	54.44	−6.91
Liberal	Geoff Lutz	11,551	45.56	+6.91
Labor hold		Swing	−6.91	

1985 Victorian state election: Pascoe Vale
Party	Candidate	Votes	%	±%
Labor	Tom Edmunds	16,783	61.4	+1.3
Liberal	Vincenzo D'Aquino	10,571	38.6	+2.3
Total formal votes		27,354	96.4	
Informal votes		1,011	3.6	
Turnout		28,365	94.3	
Labor hold		Swing	0.0	

=== Elections in the 1950s ===
1955 Victorian state election: Pascoe Vale
Party	Candidate	Votes	%	±%
Labor	Arthur Drakeford	9,032	42.7	
Liberal and Country	Rudolph Reid	7,085	33.5	
Labor (A-C)	George Fewster	4,173	19.7	
Independent	Colin Portway	486	2.3	
Independent	Lancelot Hutchinson	397	1.9	
Total formal votes		21,173	2.4	
Informal votes		515	2.4	
Turnout		21,688	95.4	
Two-party-preferred result
Labor	Arthur Drakeford	12,680	59.9	
Liberal	Rudolph Reid	8,493	40.1	
Labor hold		Swing		
