= Minister for Ageing =

Minister for Ageing may refer to:

- Minister for Ageing (Australia)
  - Minister for Ageing (Victoria)
  - Minister for Ageing (New South Wales)
