= Luke Donnellan =

Australian politician

The Honourable Luke Donnellan MP
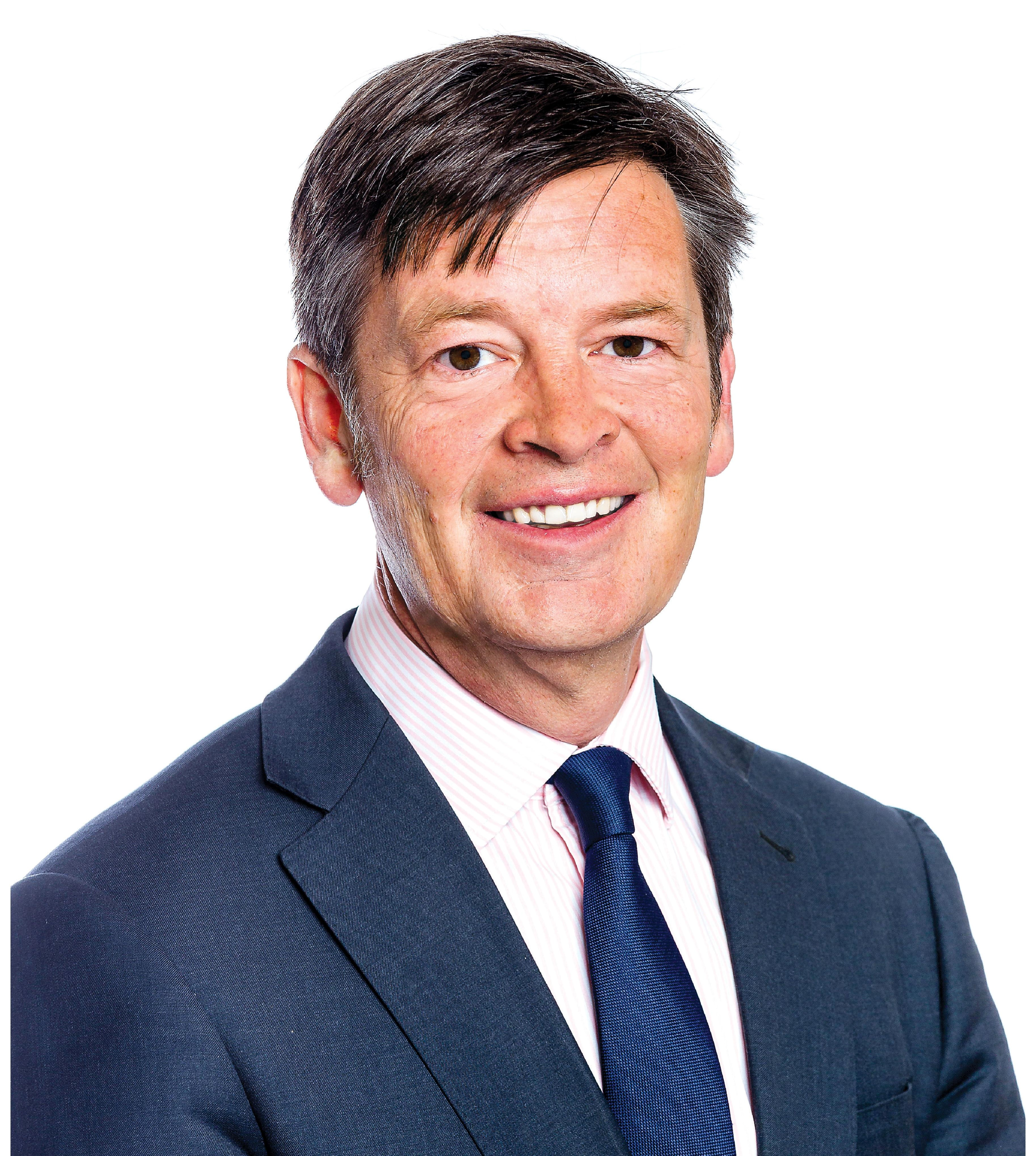

Member of the Victorian Legislative Assembly for Narre Warren North
- In office 30 November 2002 – 26 November 2022
- Succeeded by: Belinda Wilson

Minister for Child Protection
- In office 28 November 2018 – 11 October 2021
- Preceded by: New title
- Succeeded by: Richard Wynne (acting); Anthony Carbines

Minister for Disability, Ageing and Carers
- In office 28 November 2018 – 11 October 2021
- Preceded by: Martin Foley
- Succeeded by: James Merlino (acting); Anthony Carbines

Personal details
- Born: 26 March 1966 (age 60)
- Party: Labor
- Education: The University of Melbourne
- Website: www.lukedonnellan.com

Luke Anthony Donnellan (born 26 March 1966) is a former Australian politician. He was a Labor Party member of the Victorian Legislative Assembly between 2002 and his retirement in 2022, representing Narre Warren North. He was the Minister for Child Protection and the Minister for Disability, Ageing and Carers in the Second Andrews Ministry from December 2018 until October 2021. He also served as the Minister for Roads and Road Safety and Minister for Ports in the First Andrews Ministry from December 2014 to December 2018. He was a key figure in the lease of the Port of Melbourne, and led negotiations with cross benchers to enable the legislation to pass through the Victorian Parliament. He is associated with the Labor Unity faction.

== Political career ==
=== Entry into politics ===
In 2002, Donnellan was preselected as the Labor candidate for Narre Warren North, a new seat with a notional Liberal majority. He defeated the Liberal candidate and has held the seat since. In 2006, he was appointed Parliamentary Secretary for Treasury and Finance, and was promoted in August 2007 to Parliamentary Secretary to the Premier.

=== Andrews Government ===
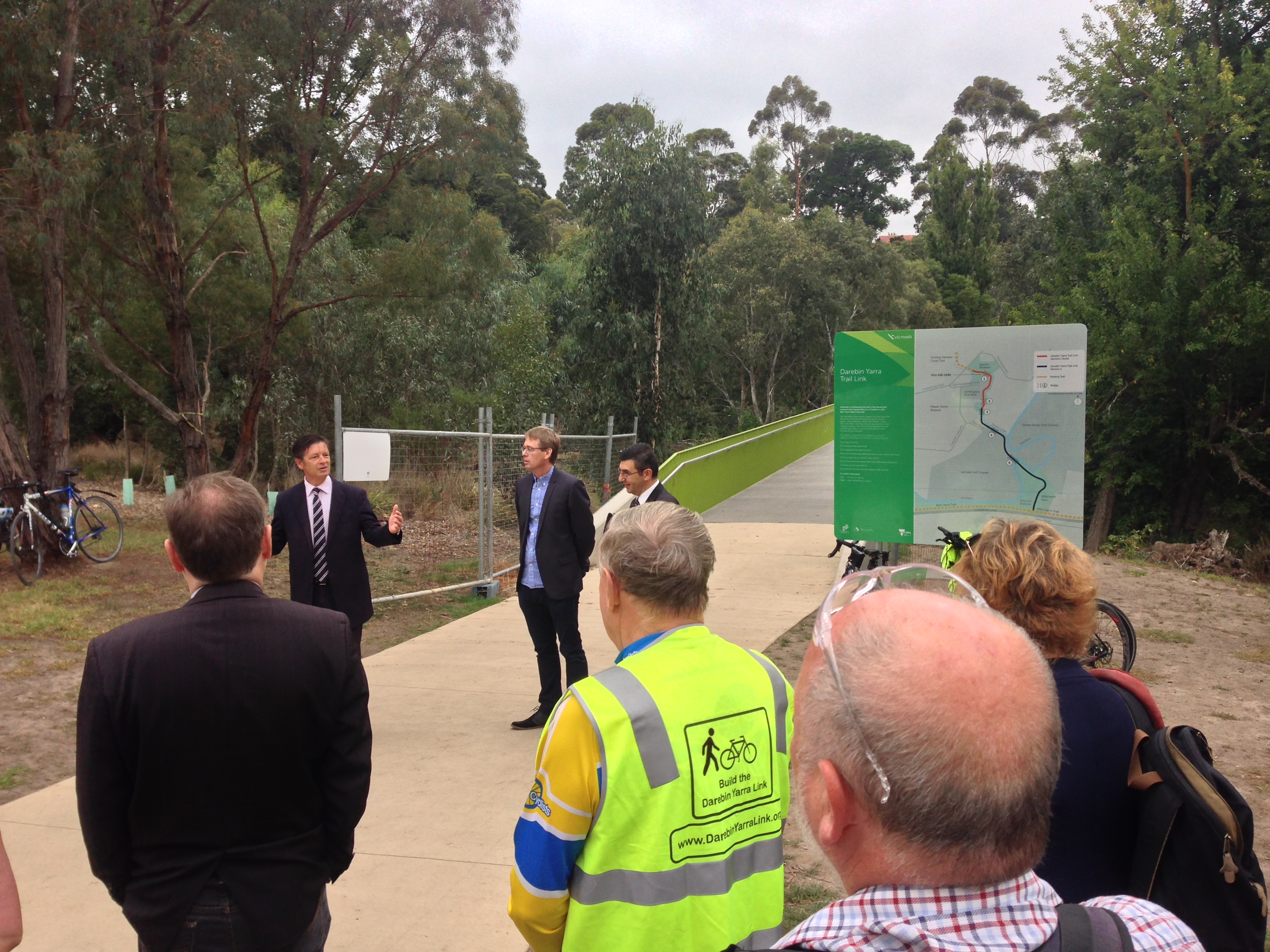
Roads Minister Luke Donnellan opening the Darebin-Yarra Link at Sparks Reserve, Ivanhoe

Following Labor's win at the 2014 Victorian state election, Donnellan was appointed Minister for Roads and Road Safety and Minister for Ports by Premier Daniel Andrews.

After Labor's reelection in 2018 Donnellan was appointed Minister for Child Protection and Minister for Disability, Ageing and Carers.

In an Independent Broad-based Anti-corruption Commission (IBAC) hearing in October 2021, an admitted branch-stacker federal Labor MP Anthony Byrne claimed that Donnellan was involved in Byrne's activities. Subsequently, Donnellan resigned from the Victorian Cabinet. On 13 December 2021, Donnellan was not preselected again for Narre Warren North by the Socialist Left-dominated ALP National Executive and as a result will not run for re-election in the 2022 Victorian state election.

== Personal life ==
Donnellan was born in Melbourne, and attended Xavier College 1977–84 where he was involved in sports, captaining the hockey team and competing in 1sts rowing. He received a Bachelor of Commerce from the University of Melbourne in 1987 and became a commercial real estate agent. After periods as a planning finance consultant and a client services manager, he became an advisor to various Labor MPs, and was a member of the Administrative Committee from 1999.

Donnellan lives in Fitzroy North.

Victorian Legislative Assembly
Seat created	Member for Narre Warren North; 2002–2022	Succeeded by Belinda Wilson
Political offices
Preceded by Terry Mulder as Minister for Roads	Minister for Roads and Road Safety; 2014–2018	Succeeded by Jaala Pulford
Preceded by David Hodgett	Minister for Ports; 2014–2018	Succeeded by Melissa Horne
Preceded by Martin Foley as Minister for Housing, Disability and Ageing	Minister for Disability, Ageing & Carers; 2018–2021	Succeeded by James Merlino (acting); Anthony Carbines
New title	Minister for Child Protection; 2018–2021	Succeeded by Richard Wynne (acting); Anthony Carbines
