= Minister for Disability (Victoria) =

Australian state ministry portfolio

Minister for Disability of Victoria
- Victorian coat of arms

- Flag of Victoria
- Incumbent; Lizzie Blandthorn MP since 5 December 2022
- Style: The Honourable
- Member of: Parliament; Executive council
- Reports to: Premier
- Nominator: Premier
- Appointer: Governor on the recommendation of the premier
- Term length: At the governor's pleasure
- Inaugural holder: Mary Wooldridge MP
- Formation: 13 March 2013

The Minister for Disability is a ministry portfolio within the Executive Council of Victoria.

== Ministers ==
Order	MP	Party affiliation	Ministerial title	Term start	Term end	Time in office	Notes
1	Mary Wooldridge MP	Liberal	Minister for Disability Services and Reform	13 March 2013	4 December 2014	1 year, 266 days	
2	Martin Foley MP	Labor	Minister for Housing, Disability and Ageing	4 December 2014	29 November 2018	3 years, 360 days	
3	Luke Donnellan MP	Labor	Minister for Disability, Ageing and Carers	29 November 2018	11 October 2021	2 years, 316 days	
4	James Merlino MP	Labor	Minister for Disability, Ageing and Carers	11 October 2021	6 December 2021	56 days	
5	Anthony Carbines MP	Labor	Minister for Disability, Ageing and Carers	6 December 2021	27 June 2022	203 days	
6	Colin Brooks MP	Labor	Minister for Disability, Ageing and Carers	27 June 2022	5 December 2022	161 days	
7	Lizzie Blandthorn MP	Labor	Minister for Disability, Ageing and Carers	5 December 2022	2 October 2023	301 days	
7	Lizzie Blandthorn MP	Labor	Minister for Disability	2 October 2023	Incumbent	2 years, 340 days	
