= Anthony Carbines =

Australian politician

The Honourable Anthony Carbines MP
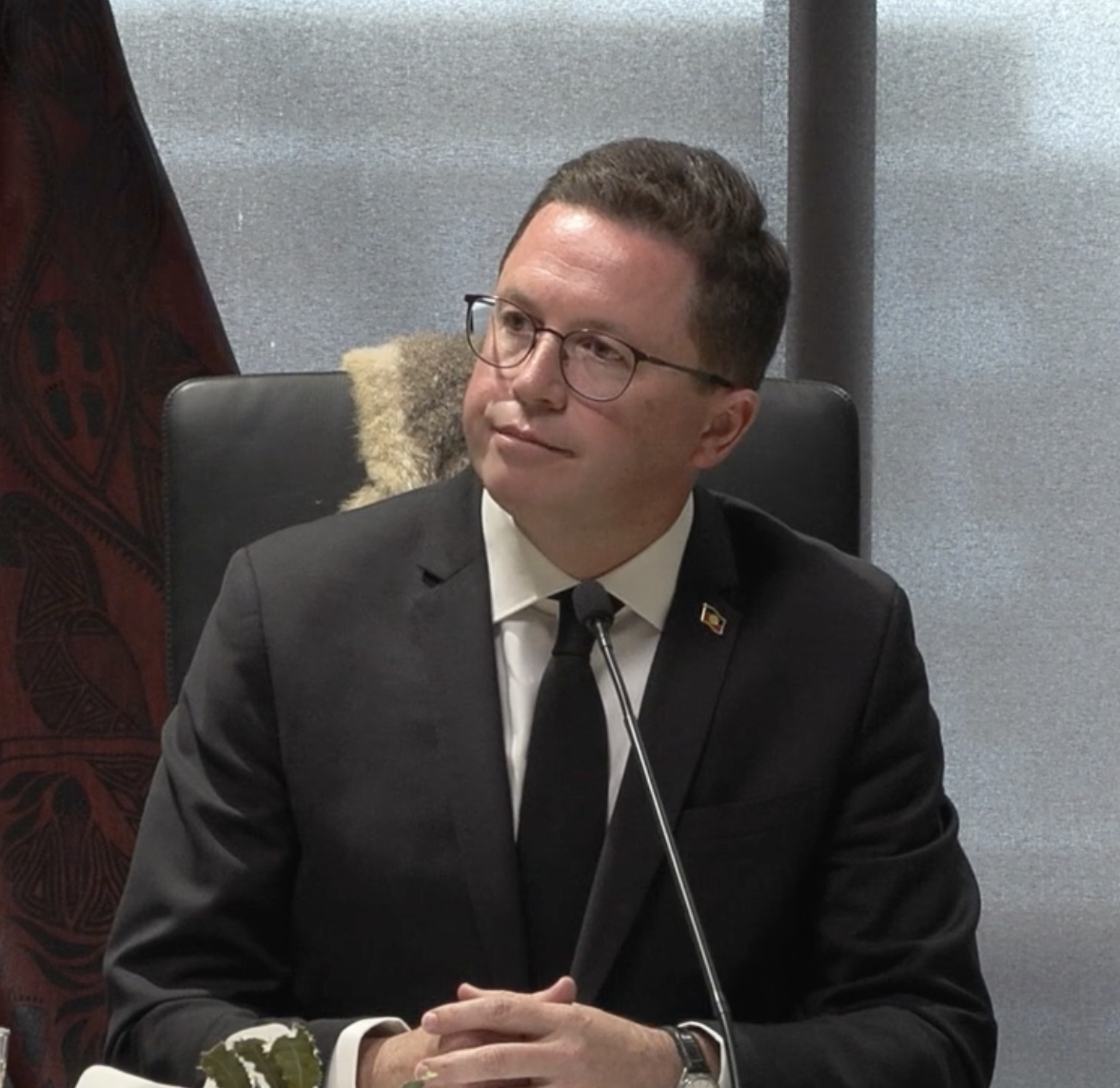

Leader of the House
- Incumbent
- Assumed office 15 April 2026
- Premier: Jacinta Allan; Ben Carroll
- Preceded by: Mary-Anne Thomas

Minister for Artificial Intelligence and Digital Economy
- Incumbent
- Assumed office 4 August 2026
- Premier: Ben Carroll
- Preceded by: Position established

Minister for Major Events
- Incumbent
- Assumed office 4 August 2026
- Premier: Ben Carroll
- Preceded by: Steve Dimopoulos

Minister for Medical Research
- Incumbent
- Assumed office 4 August 2026
- Premier: Ben Carroll
- Preceded by: Ben Carroll

Minister for Racing
- Incumbent
- Assumed office 27 June 2022
- Premier: Daniel Andrews; Jacinta Allan; Ben Carroll
- Preceded by: Martin Pakula

Minister for Economic Development
- Incumbent
- Assumed office 4 August 2026
- Premier: Ben Carroll
- Preceded by: Steve Dimopoulos (as Minister for Economic Growth and Jobs)
Other ministerial offices
Minister for Community Safety
In office 19 December 2024 – 4 August 2026
Premier	Jacinta Allan
Preceded by	Position established
Succeeded by	Position abolished
Minister for Victims
In office 19 December 2024 – 4 August 2026
Premier	Jacinta Allan
Preceded by	Position established
Succeeded by	Ros Spence (as Minister for Victims Support)
Minister for Police
In office 27 June 2022 – 4 August 2026
Premier	Daniel Andrews; Jacinta Allan
Preceded by	Lisa Neville
Succeeded by	Paul Edbrooke
Minister for Crime Prevention
In office 27 June 2022 – 19 December 2024
Premier	Daniel Andrews; Jacinta Allan
Preceded by	Natalie Hutchins
Succeeded by	Position abolished
Minister for Disability, Ageing and Carers Minister for Child Protection and Family Services
In office 6 December 2021 – 27 June 2022
Premier	Daniel Andrews
Preceded by	Luke Donnellan
Succeeded by	Colin Brooks

Member of the Victorian Legislative Assembly for Ivanhoe
- Incumbent
- Assumed office 27 November 2010
- Preceded by: Craig Langdon

Personal details
- Born: Preston, Victoria, Australia
- Party: Labor
- Spouse: Anita Brown
- Relations: Elaine Carbines (stepmother)
- Children: Ava Carbines
- Education: RMIT University
- Occupation: Journalist
- Website: www.anthonycarbines.org.au

Anthony Richard Carbines is an Australian politician in the state of Victoria. He represents the electoral district of Ivanhoe in the Victorian Legislative Assembly. As of October 2026 he is Minister for Artificial Intelligence and Digital Economy, Minister for Major Events, Minister for Medical Research, and Minister for Economic Development, and Minister for Racing.

== Early life and education ==
Anthony Richard Carbines studied journalism at RMIT University.

== Career ==
=== Journalism ===
Carbines spent five years as a journalist at the Geelong Advertiser newspaper.

=== Politics ===
Carbines is a member of the Labor Party. Prior to his election, Carbines was chief-of-staff to Labor MP and Minister for Education Bronwyn Pike, whilst also serving as a councillor on the City of Banyule council.

In 2009, he initially lost pre-selection for the seat of Ivanhoe, but that decision was subsequently overturned after the then-premier, John Brumby, intervened to pre-select Carbines instead of the sitting MP, Craig Langdon. Langdon subsequently resigned from the parliament with the election a few weeks away. Due to the cost and difficulty involved in holding a by-election, none was called and the seat remained vacant until Carbines was elected.

He represents the electoral district of Ivanhoe in the Victorian Legislative Assembly.

He was the Minister for Disability, Ageing, and Carers and the Minister for Child Protection and Family Services from December 2021.

He was the Minister for Police, Minister for Crime Prevention and Minister for Racing from June 2022 until August 2026.

He is Minister for Artificial Intelligence and Digital Economy, Minister for Major Events, Minister for Medical Research, and Minister for Economic Development (since August 2026), and Minister for Racing (since June 2022).

== Personal life ==
His stepmother is Elaine Carbines, who was a member of the Victorian Legislative Council.

== Political career ==
=== Electoral history ===
Electoral history of Anthony Carbines in the Parliament of Victoria
Year	Electorate	Party	First Preference Result				Two Candidate Result			
Year	Electorate	Party	Votes	%	+%	Position	Votes	%	+%	Result
2010	Ivanhoe	Labor	12,140	35.36	−6.43	2nd	17,755	51.68	−7.19	Elected
2014	Ivanhoe	Labor	14,133	36.0	+0.1	2nd	20,991	53.4	+1.6	Elected
2018	Ivanhoe	Labor	18,800	46.45	+10.49	1st	25,244	62.37	+8.96	Elected
2022	Ivanhoe	Labor	17,333	42.7	−3.7	1st	25,746	63.0	+0.7	Elected

Victorian Legislative Assembly
Preceded by Craig Langdon	Member for Ivanhoe; 2010–present	Incumbent
Political offices
Preceded by Luke Donnellan	Minister for Disability, Ageing and Carers; 2021–2022	Succeeded by Colin Brooks
Preceded by Luke Donnellan	Minister for Child Protection and Family Services; 2021–2022	Succeeded by Colin Brooks
Preceded by Lisa Neville	Minister for Police; 2022–present	Incumbent
Preceded by Natalie Hutchins	Minister for Crime Prevention; 2022–present	Incumbent
Preceded by Martin Pakula	Minister for Racing; 2022–present	Incumbent
