= Minister for Ageing (Victoria) =

Australian state ministry portfolio

Minister for Ageing of Victoria
- Victorian coat of arms

- Flag of Victoria
- Incumbent; Ingrid Stitt MLC since 2 October 2023
- Style: The Honourable
- Member of: Parliament; Executive council
- Reports to: Premier
- Nominator: Premier
- Appointer: Governor on the recommendation of the premier
- Term length: At the governor's pleasure
- Inaugural holder: Rob Knowles MLC
- Formation: 6 October 1992

The Minister for Ageing is a ministry portfolio within the Executive Council of Victoria.

== Ministers ==
Order	MP	Party affiliation	Ministerial title	Term start	Term end	Time in office	Notes
1	Rob Knowles MLC	Liberal	Minister for Aged Care	6 October 1992	20 October 1999	7 years, 14 days	
2	Christine Campbell MP	Labor	Minister for Senior Victorians	12 February 2002	5 December 2002	296 days	
3	Gavin Jennings MLC	Labor	Minister for Aged Care	5 December 2002	1 December 2006	3 years, 361 days	
4	Lisa Neville MP	Labor	Minister for Aged Care	1 December 2006	3 August 2007	245 days	
4	Lisa Neville MP	Labor	Minister for Senior Victorians	3 August 2007	2 December 2010	3 years, 121 days	
5	David Davis MLC	Liberal	Minister for Ageing	2 December 2010	4 December 2014	4 years, 2 days	
6	Martin Foley MP	Labor	Minister for Housing, Disability and Ageing	4 December 2014	29 November 2018	3 years, 360 days	
7	Luke Donnellan MP	Labor	Minister for Disability, Ageing and Carers	29 November 2018	11 October 2021	2 years, 316 days	
8	James Merlino MP	Labor	Minister for Disability, Ageing and Carers	11 October 2021	6 December 2021	56 days	
9	Anthony Carbines MP	Labor	Minister for Disability, Ageing and Carers	6 December 2021	27 June 2022	203 days	
10	Colin Brooks MP	Labor	Minister for Disability, Ageing and Carers	27 June 2022	5 December 2022	161 days	
11	Lizzie Blandthorn MP	Labor	Minister for Disability, Ageing and Carers	5 December 2022	2 October 2023	301 days	
12	Ingrid Stitt MLC	Labor	Minister for Ageing	2 October 2023	Incumbent	2 years, 340 days	
