= Lizzie Blandthorn =

Australian politician (born 1977)

The Honourable Lizzie Blandthorn MLC

Deputy Leader of the Government in the Victorian Legislative Council
- Incumbent
- Assumed office 5 December 2022
- Premier: Daniel Andrews
- Leader: Jaclyn Symes
- Preceded by: Gayle Tierney

Leader of the House
- In office 27 June 2022 – 5 December 2022
- Premier: Daniel Andrews
- Preceded by: Jacinta Allan
- Succeeded by: Mary-Anne Thomas
Ministerial positions
Minister for Disability
Incumbent
Assumed office 2 October 2023
Premier	Jacinta Allan
Preceded by	Herself (as Minister for Disability, Ageing and Carers)
Minister for Children
Incumbent
Assumed office 2 October 2023
Premier	Jacinta Allan
Preceded by	Herself (as Minister for Child Protection and Family Services)
Minister for Disability, Ageing and Carers
In office 5 December 2022 – 2 October 2023
Premier	Daniel Andrews
Preceded by	Colin Brooks
Succeeded by	Herself (as Minister for Disability); Ingrid Stitt (as Minister for Ageing); Ros Spence (as Minister for Carers and Volunteers)
Minister for Child Protection and Family Services
In office 5 December 2022 – 2 October 2023
Premier	Daniel Andrews
Preceded by	Colin Brooks
Succeeded by	Herself (as Minister for Children)
Minister for Planning
In office 27 June 2022 – 5 December 2022
Premier	Daniel Andrews
Preceded by	Richard Wynne
Succeeded by	Sonya Kilkenny
Electorates
Member of the Victorian Legislative Council for Western Metropolitan Region
Incumbent
Assumed office 26 November 2022
Member of the Victorian Legislative Assembly for Pascoe Vale
In office 29 November 2014 – 26 November 2022
Preceded by	Christine Campbell
Succeeded by	Anthony Cianflone

Personal details
- Born: 1 August 1977 (age 48)
- Party: Labor

Elizabeth Anne Blandthorn (born 1 August 1977) is an Australian politician. She is a member of the Victorian Legislative Council representing the Western Metropolitan Region since November 2022, and previously served as the member for the Electoral district of Pascoe Vale in the Victorian Legislative Assembly between November 2014 and November 2022. She is a member of the Labor Party.

Between June and December 2022, Blandthorn has served as the Minister for Planning in the Second Andrews ministry, as well as the Leader of the House in the Legislative Assembly. After her shift to the upper house at the 2022 state election, in December 2022, she was appointed the Minister for Child Protection and Family Services and Minister for Disability, Ageing and Carers in the Third Andrews ministry, as well as the Deputy Leader of the Government in the Legislative Council.

== Early career ==
She held the position of General Secretary in the National Union of Students in 2001. She was both a god-daughter and former political staffer to Christine Campbell, the previous member for Pascoe Vale.

Victorian Legislative Assembly
Preceded by Christine Campbell	Member for Pascoe Vale; 2014–2022	Succeeded by Anthony Cianflone
Victorian Legislative Council
Preceded by TBD	Member for Western Metropolitan Region; 2022–present	Incumbent
Political offices
Preceded by Richard Wynne	Minister for Planning; June 2022–December 2022	Succeeded by Sonya Kilkenny
