= Angelica Panopoulos =

Australian politician

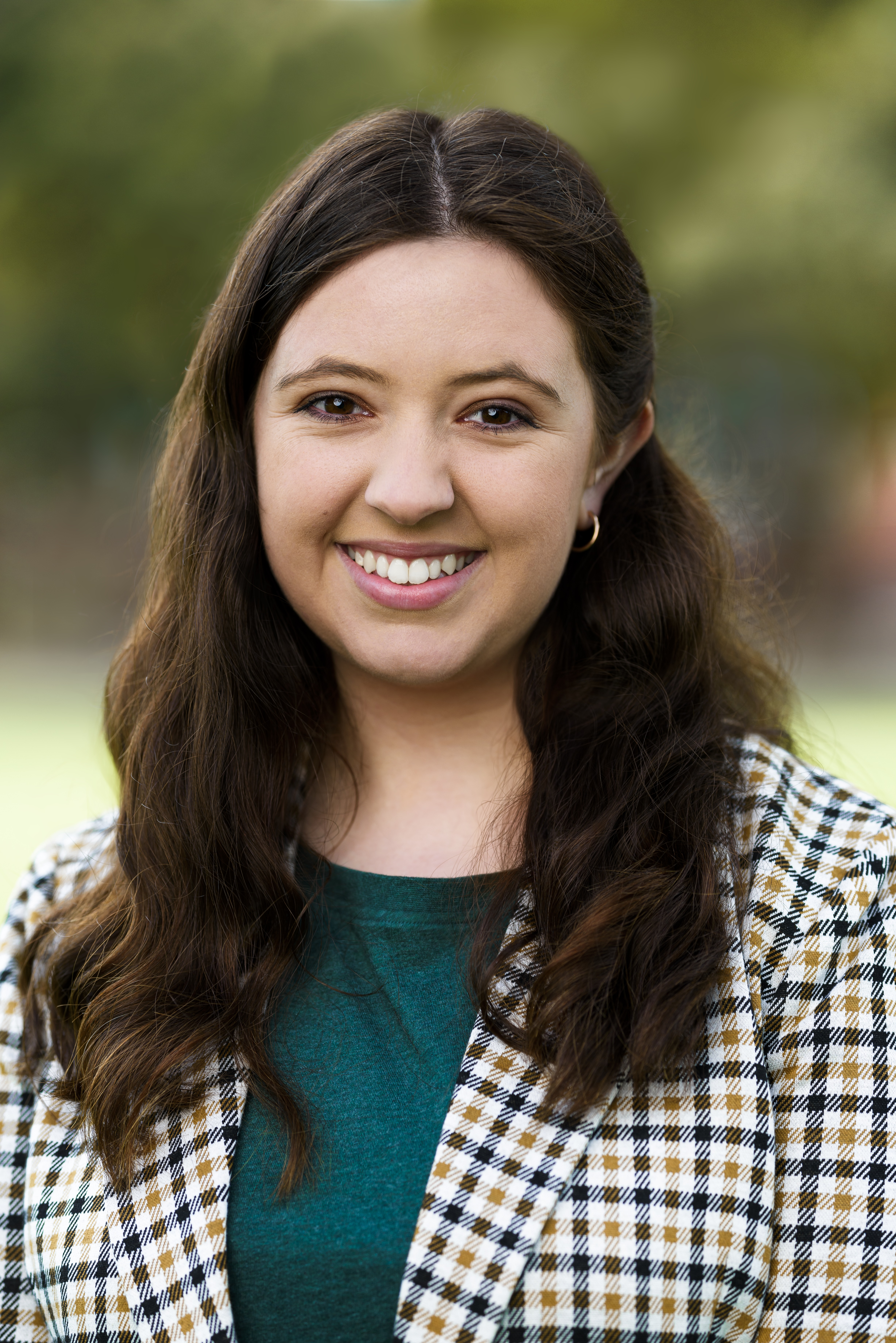

Mayor of the City of Merri-bek
- In office 29 November 2022 – 15 November 2023
- Deputy: Helen Davidson
- Preceded by: Mark Riley
- Succeeded by: Adam Pulford

Councillor of the City of Merri-bek for North-West Ward
- In office 2020–2024

Personal details
- Party: Australian Greens

Angelica Panopoulos is an Australian politician. She was former mayor of the City of Merri-bek in Victoria from November 2022 until November 2023, and has stood for the Victorian Greens in the Electoral district of Pascoe Vale in 2022 and for the upcoming 2026 Victorian state election.

== Early life and education ==
Angelica Panopoulos studied law and international relations at La Trobe University.

She is a member of the Greek-Australian community.

== Career ==
Panopoulos was a former intern in the office of Greens federal leader Richard Di Natale.

=== Mayoralty ===
Panopoulos is primarily known for her role as the former mayor of the City of Merri-bek, an office she held from 29 November 2022 until 15 November 2023. At the time of her election, she was the youngest elected member of that council, having been elected at the age of 23.

As mayor, Panopoulos was known for her involvement in having discontinued citizenship ceremonies on Australia Day. Following that decision, the council was targeted by racist extremists. She was also involved in renaming the Merri-Bek council from its previous name, the city of Moreland.

In May 2023, her council's resolutions were overruled by Victoria's planning minister in order to green-light apartment development.

=== State politics ===
Panopoulos has been nominated as the Victorian Greens candidate for Pascoe Vale for the 2026 Victorian state election. She was previously the candidate for that same seat in the 2022 Victorian state election, but narrowly lost.
