= Christine Campbell (politician) =

Australian politician (born 1953)

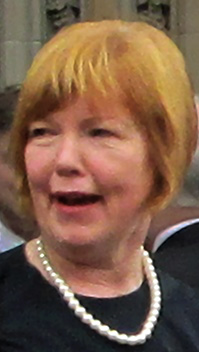

Member of the Victorian Legislative Assembly for Pascoe Vale
- In office 30 March 1996 – 29 November 2014
- Preceded by: Kelvin Thomson
- Succeeded by: Lizzie Blandthorn

Personal details
- Born: 30 November 1953 (age 72) Melbourne
- Party: Labor Party
- Children: 4
- Education: La Trobe University
- Website: christinecampbell.com.au

Christine Mary Campbell (born 30 November 1953) is an Australian politician.

== Education ==
Born in Melbourne, Campbell graduated with a Bachelor of Arts and a Diploma of Education from La Trobe University. She later was Head of the National Women's Bureau in the Shop Distributive Association from 1974–80. She became an emergency teacher and adult migrant teacher in 1981, and joined the Labor Party in 1983. In 1989 she became an electorate officer, and from 1992 to 1995 manager of the Caroline Chisholm Society.

== Political career ==
In 1996, Campbell was elected to the Victorian Legislative Assembly as the member for Pascoe Vale, succeeding Kelvin Thomson, who was elected to the federal seat of Wills. Campbell immediately became Shadow Minister for Family Services and Women's Affairs, and in 1999 moved to the Community Services portfolio. Later that year, when Labor won government under Steve Bracks, Campbell became the Minister, and in 2002 became Minister for Senior Victorians and Consumer Affairs.

Christine Campbell voted against what is now the Abortion Law Reform Act 2008. She remains actively opposed to abortion, arguing in favour of doctors who, contrary to the Act, fail to refer patients seeking abortions.

She argued in 2013 when a group of MPs were agitating for changes to the Act that she was "opposed to any law that denies people the right to exercise their conscience, because to deny conscience is to deny who a person is". She tabled a petition in Parliament calling for changes to abortion laws, which would have scraped requirements for conscientious objectors to provide a referral.

Christine is the godmother to Lizzie Blandthorn who went from being her political staffer to MP for the Victorian state seat of Pascoe Vale.

She lists her interests as bushwalking, cycling and bioethics.

== Prolife ==
Christine Campbell is the chair of the Australian Care Alliance and in 2018 described how the Alliance was formed by a group of doctors, lawyers, MPs and community activists after working together in 2017 to oppose Victoria’s assisted suicide legislation.

Since 2023, Christine Campbell has been the board chair of the Caroline Chisholm Society, funded by the Department of Families, Fairness and Housing to provide services to at risk and vulnerable women and children in the western suburbs of Melbourne. Prior to entering Parliament, Christine also worked as the Executive Director for the Society.

Victorian Legislative Assembly
Preceded by Kelvin Thomson	Member for Pascoe Vale; 1996–2014	Succeeded by Lizzie Blandthorn
