= Colin Brooks =

Australian politician (born 1970)

The Honourable Colin Brooks MP

Treasurer of Victoria
- Incumbent
- Assumed office 4 August 2026
- Premier: Ben Carroll
- Preceded by: Jaclyn Symes

Minister for Industrial Relations
- Incumbent
- Assumed office 4 August 2026
- Premier: Ben Carroll
- Preceded by: Jaclyn Symes
Other ministerial offices
Minister for Skills and TAFE
In office 15 April 2026 – 4 August 2026
Premier	Jacinta Allan
Preceded by	Gayle Tierney
Succeeded by	Gabrielle Williams (as Minister for Skills and Training)
Minister for Defence Industry
In office 15 April 2026 – 4 August 2026
Premier	Jacinta Allan
Preceded by	Position established
Succeeded by	Melissa Horne
Minister for Industry, Advanced Manufacturing and Innovation
In office 15 April 2026 – 4 August 2026
Premier	Jacinta Allan
Preceded by	Himself (as Minister for Industry and Advanced Manufacturing)
Succeeded by	Melissa Horne (as Minister for Industry and Advanced Manufacturing)
Minister for Creative Industries
In office 2 October 2023 – 21 April 2026
Premier	Jacinta Allan
Preceded by	Steve Dimopoulos
Succeeded by	Vicki Ward
Minister for Industry and Advanced Manufacturing
In office 2 October 2023 – 15 April 2026
Premier	Jacinta Allan
Preceded by	Natalie Hutchins (as Minister for Jobs and Industry)
Succeeded by	Himself (as Minister for Industry, Advanced Manufacturing and Innovation)
Minister for Development VictoriaMinister for Precincts
In office 2 October 2023 – 19 December 2024
Premier	Jacinta Allan
Preceded by	Position established
Succeeded by	Harriet Shing
Minister for Housing
In office 5 December 2022 – 2 October 2023
Premier	Daniel Andrews
Preceded by	Danny Pearson
Succeeded by	Harriet Shing
Minister for Multicultural Affairs
In office 5 December 2022 – 2 October 2023
Premier	Daniel Andrews
Preceded by	Ros Spence
Succeeded by	Ingrid Stitt
Minister for Child Protection and Family Services
In office 27 June 2022 – 5 December 2022
Premier	Daniel Andrews
Preceded by	Anthony Carbines
Succeeded by	Lizzie Blandthorn
Minister for Disability, Ageing and Carers
In office 27 June 2022 – 5 December 2022
Premier	Daniel Andrews
Preceded by	Anthony Carbines
Succeeded by	Lizzie Blandthorn

37th Speaker of the Victorian Legislative Assembly
- In office 7 March 2017 – 2 August 2022
- Deputy: Maree Edwards
- Preceded by: Telmo Languiller
- Succeeded by: Maree Edwards

Member of the Victorian Legislative Assembly for Bundoora
- Incumbent
- Assumed office 25 November 2006
- Preceded by: Sherryl Garbutt

Personal details
- Born: 9 January 1970 (age 56) Sydney, New South Wales, Australia
- Party: Labor Party
- Occupation: Politician
- Website: www.colinbrooks.com.au

Colin William Brooks (born 9 January 1970) is an Australian politician. He has been a Labor Party member of the Victorian Legislative Assembly since 2006, representing the electorate of Bundoora. He is currently the Minister for Housing and Minister for Multicultural Affairs since December 2022, having previously served as the Speaker of the Victorian Legislative Assembly from March 2017 until his ministerial appointment.

== Early life ==
Born in Sydney, he was educated at De La Salle College in Ashfield before receiving an electrical trades certificate from Petersham TAFE. He was an electrician from 1990 to 1996.

== Political career ==
In 1996, Brooks became an electorate officer. From 1997 to 2005, he served on Banyule City Council, being mayor from 1998 to 1999 and 2001 to 2002. In 2006, he was selected as the Labor candidate for the safe seat of Bundoora in the 2006 state election, after the retirement of sitting member Sherryl Garbutt. He has represented the seat since. In March 2017, he was chosen by the Labor Caucus to replace Telmo Languiller as Speaker of the Legislative Assembly. He was re-elected as Speaker in December 2018.

Brooks was appointed as Minister for Child Protection and Family Services and Minister for Disability, Ageing and Carers in the Second Andrews Ministry in June 2022. Following his tenure, Brooks was appointed as Minister for Housing and Minister for Multicultural Affairs from 5 December 2022 to 2 October 2023. As of 2 October 2023, Brooks holds the positions of Minister for Development Victoria, Minister for Precincts, and Minister for Creative Industries.

Brooks is a member of the Australian Workers Union, and hence the Victorian Labor Right.

=== Electoral history ===
Electoral history of Colin Brooks in the Parliament of Victoria
Year	Electorate	Party	First Preference Result				Two Candidate Result			
Year	Electorate	Party	Votes	%	+%	Position	Votes	%	+%	Result
2006	Bundoora	Labor	16,868	53.05	−6.46	1st	20,701	65.12	−2.45	Elected
2010	Bundoora	Labor	14,967	46.06	−6.99	1st	18,784	18,784	−7.43	Elected
2014	Bundoora	Labor	18,628	52.7	+2.6	1st	22,035	62.2	+1.3	Elected
2018	Bundoora	Labor	19,670	56.2	+3.5	1st	23,664	67.4	+5.2	Elected
2022	Bundoora	Labor	19,288	47.8	−7.7	1st	25,364	62.7	−3.5	Elected

== Personal life ==
Brooks is married with three children. He takes an interest in fishing and gardening. In 2001, he received the Centenary Medal.

Victorian Legislative Assembly
Preceded by Sherryl Garbutt	Member for Bundoora; 2006–present	Incumbent
Preceded by Telmo Languiller	Speaker of the Victorian Legislative Assembly; 2017–2022	Succeeded by Maree Edwards
Political offices
Preceded by Anthony Carbines	Minister for Child Protection and Family Services; 2022–2022	Succeeded by Lizzie Blandthorn
Preceded by Anthony Carbines	Minister for Disability, Ageing and Carers; 2022–2022	Succeeded by Lizzie Blandthorn
Preceded by Danny Pearson	Minister for Housing; 2022–2023	Succeeded by Harriet Shing
Preceded by Ros Spence	Minister for Multicultural Affairs; 2022–2023	Succeeded by Ingrid Stitt
Preceded by	Minister for Development Victoria; 2023–present	Incumbent
Preceded by	Minister for Precincts; 2023–present	Incumbent
Preceded by Steve Dimopoulos	Minister for Creative Industries; 2023–present	Incumbent
