= Electoral district of Pascoe Vale =

State electoral district of Victoria, Australia

Pascoe Vale Victoria—Legislative Assembly
- Interactive map of electoral district boundaries from the 2022 state election
- State: Victoria
- Dates current: 1955–1958; 1985–present
- MP: Anthony Cianflone
- Party: Labor Party
- Namesake: Pascoe Vale
- Electors: 51,163 (2018)
- Area: 21 km^{2} (8.1 sq mi)
- Demographic: Metropolitan
Electorates around Pascoe Vale:
Broadmeadows	Broadmeadows	Preston
Essendon	Pascoe Vale	Preston
Essendon	Brunswick	Northcote

The electoral district of Pascoe Vale is an electoral district of the Victorian Legislative Assembly.

== Members ==
First incarnation (1955–1958)
Member	Party	Term
Arthur Drakeford Jr	Labor	1955–1958
Second incarnation (1985–present)
Member	Party	Term
Tom Edmunds	Labor	1985–1988
Kelvin Thomson	Labor	1988–1996
Christine Campbell	Labor	1996–2014
Lizzie Blandthorn	Labor	2014–2022
Anthony Cianflone	Labor	2022–present

== Election results ==
2022 Victorian state election: Pascoe Vale
Party	Candidate	Votes	%	±%
Labor	Anthony Cianflone	15,611	38.8	+0.5
Greens	Angelica Panopoulos	9,034	22.4	+1.9
Liberal	Tom Wright	8,461	21.0	+9.4
Victorian Socialists	Madaleine Hah	2,228	5.5	+3.2
Ind. (Socialist Alliance)	Sue Bolton	1,689	4.2	+4.2
Reason	Margee Glover	1,281	3.2	+1.9
Family First	Richard Cimbaro	1,080	2.7	+2.7
Animal Justice	Elizabeth Adams	889	2.2	+0.1
Total formal votes		40,273	94.7	+1.6
Informal votes		2,249	5.3	−1.6
Turnout		42,522	87.5	+2.5
Notional two-party-preferred count
Labor	Anthony Cianflone	29,096	72.2	+0.0
Liberal	Tom Wright	11,177	27.8	−0.0
Two-candidate-preferred result
Labor	Anthony Cianflone	20,950	52.0	−20.2
Greens	Angelica Panopoulos	19,323	48.0	+48.0
Labor hold		Swing	N/A	
