= Anthony Cianflone =

Australian politician

- Cianflone in 2026

Member of the Victorian Legislative Assembly for Pascoe Vale
- Incumbent
- Assumed office 26 November 2022
- Preceded by: Lizzie Blandthorn
- Majority: Labor

Personal details
- Born: Melbourne
- Party: Labor

Anthony Cianflone is an Australian politician who is a current member of the Victorian Legislative Assembly, representing the state electoral district of Pascoe Vale, which contains the suburbs of Pascoe Vale, Coburg and parts of Brunswick West. He was elected to his seat in the 2022 state election.

Anthony Cianflone now lives in Pascoe Vale with his wife, where they raise a young family.

He is a member of the Labor Party.

== Early life and education ==
Anthony was born in Melbourne's inner north to parents who had migrated from Italy. He grew up in the suburb of Coburg. Anthony attended the local public school Coburg West Primary, and played for local sporting clubs including Brunswick Juventus.

== Political career ==
Over the following two decades, Anthony worked across federal, state, and local governments, as well as in the private, non-governmental, and community sectors. These experiences informed his advocacy on government decision-making and its role in improving people’s lives, including promoting aspiration and supporting local communities and constituents.

Anthony is a former Citizen of the Year, who was one of the founding members of the oxYgen Youth Hub in Coburg. OxYgen Youth Hub is Moreland's first youth space and on the official website describes itself as "a place for young people to hang out, meet friends, find support, learn new skills and participate in a range of activities."

He has over two decades of experiences working across federal, state and local governments, as well as across the private, non-government and community sectors.

As the former chair of the Robinson Reserve Neighbourhood House, Anthony works in his local community to create safe spaces for people of all backgrounds in and around his local community.

Anthony was preselected following previous MP Lizzie Blandthorn's decision to contest the Legislative Council.

== Personal life ==
Anthony is the son of Italian migrant parents, growing up in the Pascoe Vale state electoral district of Pascoe Vale. Growing up in Coburg, he attended local public school at Coburg West Primary and played for local sporting clubs including Brunswick Juventus, Essendon Royals, Bulleen Veneto Club, Heidelberg United and also as the Victorian first choice Junior Goalkeeper during his teenage years. Anthony worked in hospitality, which he says taught him "the values of hard work, resilience and the fair go."

Now living in Pascoe Vale with his wife, raising their young family, Anthony states that his ambition as the State Member of Pascoe Vale is "to help build a better and fairer community to live, learn, work, raise a family and retire in."
