= Electoral results for the Chelsea Province =

Victoria, Australia, district election results

This is a list of electoral results for the Chelsea Province in Victorian state elections.

== Members for Chelsea Province ==
Member 1	Party	Year		
Neil Stacey	Liberal	1976	Member 2	Party
Neil Stacey	Liberal	1979	Eric Kent	Labor
Mal Sandon	Labor	1982	Eric Kent	Labor
Mal Sandon	Labor	1985	Maureen Lyster	Labor
Burwyn Davidson	Labor	1988	Maureen Lyster	Labor
Burwyn Davidson	Labor	1992	Sue Wilding	Liberal
Cameron Boardman	Liberal	1996	Sue Wilding	Liberal
Cameron Boardman	Liberal	1999	Bob Smith	Labor
Matt Viney	Labor	2002	Bob Smith	Labor

== Election results ==
=== Elections in the 2000s ===
2002 Victorian state election: Chelsea Province
Party	Candidate	Votes	%	±%
Labor	Matt Viney	69,508	54.0	+5.5
Liberal	Vanthida Lao	42,715	33.2	−11.9
Greens	Hilary Bray	11,904	9.3	+8.7
Democrats	Wendy Thacker	4,525	3.5	−0.5
Total formal votes		128,652	96.1	−0.2
Informal votes		5,234	3.9	+0.2
Turnout		133,886	92.9	
Two-party-preferred result
Labor	Matt Viney	80,160	61.7	+8.9
Liberal	Vanthida Lao	49,825	38.3	−8.9
Labor hold		Swing	+8.9	

=== Elections in the 1990s ===
1999 Victorian state election: Chelsea Province
Party	Candidate	Votes	%	±%
Labor	Bob Smith	57,949	47.5	+5.3
Liberal	Sue Wilding	56,642	46.4	−4.3
Democrats	James Bennett	5,250	4.3	−0.4
Independent	Michael Good	2,185	1.8	+1.8
Total formal votes		122,026	96.4	−1.1
Informal votes		4,621	3.6	+1.1
Turnout		126,647	93.2	
Two-party-preferred result
Labor	Bob Smith	62,501	51.2	+4.5
Liberal	Sue Wilding	59,525	48.8	−4.5
Labor gain from Liberal		Swing	+4.5	

1996 Victorian state election: Chelsea Province
Party	Candidate	Votes	%	±%
Liberal	Cameron Boardman	61,122	50.7	+0.7
Labor	Burwyn Davidson	50,902	42.2	+1.7
Democrats	Kaylyn Raynor	5,694	4.7	+4.7
Democratic Labor	Mechelina Schalken	1,480	1.2	−3.2
Natural Law	Lee Fergusson	1,394	1.2	+1.2
Total formal votes		120,592	97.5	+1.9
Informal votes		3,155	2.5	−1.9
Turnout		123,747	94.3	
Two-party-preferred result
Liberal	Cameron Boardman	64,158	53.3	−0.9
Labor	Burwyn Davidson	56,315	46.7	+0.9
Liberal gain from Labor		Swing	−0.9	

1992 Victorian state election: Chelsea Province
Party	Candidate	Votes	%	±%
Liberal	Sue Wilding	58,108	49.9	+4.7
Labor	Maureen Lyster	47,127	40.5	−11.4
Independent	Judith O'Dwyer	5,929	5.1	+5.1
Democratic Labor	John Cass	5,199	4.5	+4.5
Total formal votes		116,363	95.5	+0.4
Informal votes		5,455	4.5	−0.4
Turnout		121,818	95.3	
Two-party-preferred result
Liberal	Sue Wilding	62,868	54.2	+7.6
Labor	Maureen Lyster	53,161	45.8	−7.6
Liberal gain from Labor		Swing	+7.6	

=== Elections in the 1980s ===
1988 Victorian state election: Chelsea Province
Party	Candidate	Votes	%	±%
Labor	Burwyn Davidson	54,959	50.5	−1.7
Liberal	Michael O'Brien	49,707	45.7	−2.1
Independent	Ken Glyde	4,074	3.8	+3.8
Total formal votes		108,740	96.0	−1.0
Informal votes		4,562	4.0	+1.0
Turnout		113,302	92.4	−0.8
Two-party-preferred result
Labor	Burwyn Davidson	57,092	52.5	+0.3
Liberal	Michael O'Brien	51,171	47.8	−0.3
Labor hold		Swing	+0.3	

1985 Victorian state election: Chelsea Province
Party	Candidate	Votes	%	±%
Labor	Maureen Lyster	55,866	52.2	
Liberal	Michael Herbst	51,171	47.8	
Total formal votes		107,037	97.0	
Informal votes		3,321	3.0	
Turnout		110,358	93.2	
Labor hold		Swing	−2.9	

1982 Victorian state election: Chelsea Province
Party	Candidate	Votes	%	±%
Labor	Mal Sandon	72,115	58.0	+6.4
Liberal	Neil Stacey	52,125	42.0	−6.4
Total formal votes		124,240	96.4	+0.1
Informal votes		4,686	3.6	−0.1
Turnout		128,926	93.8	0.0
Labor gain from Liberal		Swing	+6.4	

=== Elections in the 1970s ===
1979 Victorian state election: Chelsea Province
Party	Candidate	Votes	%	±%
Labor	Eric Kent	59,381	51.2	+2.4
Liberal	Geoffrey Connard	55,684	48.8	−2.4
Total formal votes		115,065	96.3	−0.5
Informal votes		4,369	3.7	+0.5
Turnout		119,434	93.8	+1.3
Labor gain from Liberal		Swing	+2.4	

1976 Victorian state election: Chelsea Province
Party	Candidate	Votes	%	±%
Liberal	Neil Stacey	53,970	51.2	
Labor	Michael Duffy	51,521	48.8	
Total formal votes		105,491	96.8	
Informal votes		3,512	3.2	
Turnout		109,003	92.5	
Liberal hold		Swing		
