= Candidates of the 1988 Victorian state election =

The 1988 Victorian state election was held on 1 October 1988.

== Seat changes ==
A number of members contested different seats:

- Thomastown Labor MLC Jim Kennan contested the lower house seat of Broadmeadows.
- Melbourne West Labor MLC Joan Kirner contested the lower house seat of Williamstown.
- Gippsland Labor MLC Barry Murphy contested the lower house seat of Morwell as an independent.
- Chelsea Labor MLC Mal Sandon contested the lower house seat of Carrum.

== Retiring Members ==
=== Labor ===
- Valerie Callister MLA (Morwell)
- Ian Cathie MLA (Carrum)
- Tom Edmunds MLA (Pascoe Vale)
- Bill Fogarty MLA (Sunshine)
- Gordon Hockley MLA (Bentleigh)
- Carl Kirkwood MLA (Preston)
- Keith Remington MLA (Melbourne)
- Theo Sidiropoulos MLA (Richmond)
- Jack Simpson MLA (Niddrie)
- Gordon Stirling MLA (Williamstown)
- Frank Wilkes MLA (Northcote)

=== Liberal ===
- Digby Crozier MLA (Portland)
- Jim Ramsay MLA (Balwyn)
- Morris Williams MLA (Doncaster)
- Jock Granter MLC (Central Highlands)
- Bruce Reid MLC (Bendigo)
- Roy Ward MLC (South Eastern)

=== National ===
- Milton Whiting MLA (Mildura)
- Bernie Dunn MLC (North Western)

== Legislative Assembly ==
Sitting members are shown in bold text. Successful candidates are highlighted in the relevant colour. Where there is possible confusion, an asterisk (*) is also used.

Electorate	Held by	Labor candidates	Liberal candidates	National candidates	Other candidates
Albert Park	Labor	**Bunna Walsh**	Andrew Lindsay		Kathleen Brown (Ind); Anne Fahey (Ind)
Ballarat North	Liberal	Steve Bracks	**Steve Elder**	Geoffrey Mark	John Blanchard (Ind)
Ballarat South	Labor	**Frank Sheehan**	Joan Chambers	Donald Phelan	Phil Henseleit (Dem)
Balwyn	Liberal	George Theodoridis	Robert Clark		
Bellarine	Labor	**Graham Ernst**	Margaret Byrne	John Foster	Laurie Levy (Dem)
Benalla	National	Barbara Stepan	Margaret Stribling	**Pat McNamara**	Grant Triffett (Ind); Win Wise (CTA)
Benambra	Liberal	Julie Nelson	**Lou Lieberman**	Judith Brewer	
Bendigo East	Liberal	Bob Cameron	**Michael John**	Leon Waddington	Vic Upson (CTA)
Bendigo West	Labor	**David Kennedy**	William Maltby	Peter McNaught	Graeme Furlong (CTA); Harold Hall (Ind); Peter Shaw-Truex (Dem)
Bennettswood	Liberal	Nigel De Kretser	**Roger Pescott**		Geoff Carr (Dem)
Bentleigh	Labor	Ann Barker	Peter Norman		Janette de San Sinforiano (Ind); Anne Martin (Dem); Phillip McGibbony (CTA); Frank Penhalluriack (WTP); Alan Salter (Ind)
Berwick	Liberal	Philip Huggins	**Rob Maclellan**		Jyan Mayfield (Dem)
Box Hill	Labor	**Margaret Ray**	Helen Shardey		Peter Allan (Ind); George Demetriou (Dem); William Watson (CTA)
Brighton	Liberal	Jennifer Huppert	**Alan Stockdale**		John Casley (Ind)
Broadmeadows	Labor	Jim Kennan	Carol Lutz		**Jack Culpin** (Ind)
Brunswick	Labor	**Tom Roper**	Louise Joyce		Michael Rowe (DLP)
Bulleen	Liberal	David Redfearn	**David Perrin**		
Bundoora	Labor	**John Cain**	John Goodfellow		
Burwood	Liberal	Eric Hobsbawn	**Jeff Kennett**		Barbara McCrohan (CTA)
Carrum	Labor	Mal Sandon	Marie McIntosh		
Caulfield	Liberal	David Jackson	**Ted Tanner**		
Clayton	Labor	**Gerard Vaughan**	Lauris White		Stephen Bingle (Ind); Daryl Esmore (CTA)
Coburg	Labor	**Peter Gavin**	Erdem Aydin		Norma Willoughby (Ind)
Dandenong	Labor	**Terry Norris**	Poh Loh		
Dandenong North	Labor	**Jan Wilson**	Peter McNeil		
Derrimut	Labor	**David Cunningham**	Helen Hurley		Michael Newman (Ind)
Doncaster	Liberal	Steven Tsitas	Victor Perton		Guy Salthouse (CTA); Wayne Wright (Ind)
Doveton	Labor	**Rob Jolly**	Rodney Lavin		
Dromana	Liberal	Robert Reilly	**Ron Wells**		Florence Bubb (Ind); Cecil Gill (Ind)
Essendon	Labor	**Barry Rowe**	Thomas Hilbert		Karl Benden (CTA)
Evelyn	Liberal	Geoff Cooper	**Jim Plowman**		Earle Keegel (Ind)
Footscray	Labor	**Robert Fordham**	Ernest Zanatta		Elizabeth Doughney (Ind)
Forest Hill	Liberal	John Madden	**John Richardson**		
Frankston North	Labor	**Jane Hill**	Olga Venables		Mike Toldy (Ind)
Frankston South	Liberal	Tony Moore	**Graeme Weideman**		
Geelong	Labor	**Hayden Shell**	Ann Henderson		Ian Winter (CTA)
Geelong North	Labor	**Neil Trezise**	Michael King		Ernest Andrews (CTA)
Gippsland East	National	Jan Devink	William Young	**Bruce Evans**	Robert Watson (CTA)
Gippsland South	National	Keith Vardy	Anne-Marie McBeath	**Tom Wallace**	Leslie Howlett (CTA)
Gippsland West	Liberal	Anwyn Martin	**Alan Brown**	Philip Westwood	
Gisborne	Liberal	Eric Dearricott	**Tom Reynolds**		Glenn Torney (Ind)
Glen Waverley	Liberal	Ronald Kirkwood	**Ross Smith**		Peter Olney (CTA)
Greensborough	Labor	**Pauline Toner**	Robert Manuell		
Hawthorn	Liberal	Bridget Groves	**Phil Gude**		
Ivanhoe	Liberal	Patricia Moynihan	**Vin Heffernan**		Howard McCallum (Dem)
Keilor	Labor	**George Seitz**	Chris Dimitrijevic		Charles Campagnac (Ind); Shane McCarthy (DLP)
Kew	Liberal	Tim Muffet	**Jan Wade**		
Knox	Labor	**Steve Crabb**	Bruce Bingham		Stephen Gillies (Ind); Kenneth Morgan (CTA)
Lowan	National	Robert Luciani	Roderick Coutts	**Bill McGrath**	
Malvern	Liberal	Philip Cottier	**Geoff Leigh**		
Melbourne	Labor	Neil Cole	Catherine Dossetor		
Mentone	Labor	**Peter Spyker**	Maxwell Read		Sarah Austin (Dem); John Murray (Ind)
Mildura	National	Lindsay Leake	Craig Bildstien	John Arnold	David Caccianiga (Ind)
Mitcham	Labor	**John Harrowfield**	Matthew Starr		Johan Elsmann (CTA); Louise Enders (Dem)
Monbulk	Labor	**Neil Pope**	Nola Vulling		Christopher Shirreff (CTA)
Mornington	Liberal	Barry Smith	**Robin Cooper**		Peter Carroll (Dem)
Morwell	Labor	Keith Hamilton	Norman Olsen	Alan Witchell	Geoffrey Francis (Ind); Barry Murphy (Ind); James Richards (Dem)
Murray Valley	National	Jill Milthorpe	Diane Mathieson	**Ken Jasper**	
Narracan	Liberal	Neil Young	**John Delzoppo**	Kenneth Ipsen	David White (Dem)
Niddrie	Labor	Bob Sercombe	Susan Feltham		Lance Hutchinson (Ind)
Northcote	Labor	Tony Sheehan	Ross Lane		
Oakleigh	Labor	**Race Mathews**	Ian Pope		Philip Mitchell (Ind); Heather Norling (Ind); Antonis Pashos (Ind)
Pascoe Vale	Labor	Kelvin Thomson	Geoff Lutz		Mark Beshara (DLP); Cath Price (Ind)
Polwarth	Liberal	Paul Kennelly	**Ian Smith**	Michael Evans	
Portland	Liberal	Bill Sharrock	Denis Napthine	Graeme Dawson	
Prahran	Liberal	Roman Jade	**Don Hayward**		Neil Baluch (CTA)
Preston	Labor	Michael Leighton	Peter Papaemmanouil		
Reservoir	Labor	**Jim Simmonds**	Richard Michelsons		Alan Hogan (Ind)
Richmond	Labor	Demetri Dollis	David Monk		Steve Florin (Ind); Bill Hampson (Ind); John Mulholland (DLP)
Ringwood	Labor	**Kay Setches**	Bruce Camfield		Mark Ansell (CTA); James Cockell (Ind); Sid Spindler (Dem)
Ripon	Liberal	John McQuilten	**Tom Austin**		
Rodney	National	Leonard Blair	Margarita Dale	**Eddie Hann**	
St Albans	Labor	**Alex Andrianopoulos**	George Korytsky		Peter Portelli (Ind)
St Kilda	Labor	**Andrew McCutcheon**	John Callanan		Geoffrey Brooks (Dem)
Sandringham	Liberal	Ian Pugh	**David Lea**		John Minty (CTA)
Shepparton	National	David Wauchope	John Menzies	**Peter Ross-Edwards**	
South Barwon	Liberal	George Williams	**Harley Dickinson**		Terry Winter (CTA)
Springvale	Labor	**Eddie Micallef**	Kieran Magee	Wernfried Klimek	Jodie Rickard (CTA)
Sunshine	Labor	Ian Baker	Julie Reid		Alan Finch (Ind)
Swan Hill	National	Ronald Stanton	Daphne Wilkins	**Barry Steggall**	
Syndal	Liberal	James Claven	**Geoff Coleman**		Martin Maguire (Dem); Ronald Marshman (CTA)
Thomastown	Labor	**Beth Gleeson**	Michael Fusco		
Wantirna	Labor	**Carolyn Hirsh**	Rob Llewellyn		John Taylor (CTA)
Warrandyte	Labor	**Lou Hill**	Phil Honeywood		Nelleke Arnold (CTA); David Ball (Dem); Harold Collins (Ind); Joy Lane (Ind)
Warrnambool	National	Peter Steele	Eda Ritchie	**John McGrath**	
Werribee	Labor	**Ken Coghill**	Alexander Mather		John Gibbons (Ind)
Whittlesea	Labor	**Max McDonald**	Geoffrey Parsons		
Williamstown	Labor	Joan Kirner	Stuart Mackley		Richard Kirby (Ind)

== Legislative Council ==
Sitting members are shown in bold text. Successful candidates are highlighted in the relevant colour. Where there is possible confusion, an asterisk (*) is also used.

Province	Held by	Labor candidates	Liberal candidates	National candidates	Other candidates
Ballarat	Liberal	Glendon Ludbrook	**Rob Knowles**	Anne Scott	
Boronia	Labor	**Judith Dixon**	Gerald Ashman		
Central Highlands	Liberal	Andre Haermeyer	Geoff Craige	Edward Drane	
Chelsea	Labor	Burwyn Davidson	Michael O'Brien		Ken Glyde (Ind)
Doutta Galla	Labor	**Bill Landeryou**	Graeme Cameron		
East Yarra	Liberal	Terry Monagle	**Haddon Storey**		
Eumemmerring	Labor	Bob Ives	Janice Bateman		
Geelong	Labor	**David Henshaw**	John Lucas		James Jordan (Ind); Dirk Terpstra (CTA)
Gippsland	Liberal	Alan Hollway	James Taylor	Peter Hall	Bruce Ingle (Ind); Glen Mann (Ind)
Higinbotham	Liberal	Kevin McCosh	**Geoffrey Connard**		
Jika Jika	Labor	Theo Theophanous	John Badham		
Melbourne	Labor	**Barry Pullen**	Katherine Edgar		
Melbourne North	Labor	**Caroline Hogg**	Simon St John		
Melbourne West	Labor	Licia Kokocinski	Darren Olney		
Monash	Liberal	Perce White	**James Guest**		
North Eastern	National	Ewan Paterson	Ian Cumming	**David Evans**	
North Western	National	Linda Freedman	Derek Bowman	Ron Best	
Nunawading	Labor	**Laurie McArthur**	George Cox		
South Eastern	Liberal	Denise Hassett	Ken Smith		
Templestowe	Liberal	**Mike Arnold**	Bruce Skeggs		
Waverley	Labor	**Brian Mier**	Savvas Grigoropoulos		
Western	Liberal	Kevin Watt	**Bruce Chamberlain**	James Saunders	Julie Jennings (Ind)
