= Pre-election pendulum for the 2014 Victorian state election =

The following is a Mackerras pendulum for the 2014 Victorian state election.

The margins are notional figures, calculated by Antony Green for the Victorian Electoral Commission following a redistribution of Victoria's electoral boundaries in 2013. Four seats (Bellarine, Monbulk, Ripon and Yan Yean) are held by the Labor Party, but the redistributed boundaries have made them notionally Liberal-held.

"Very safe" seats require a swing of over 20 per cent to change, "safe" seats require a swing of 10 to 20 per cent to change, "fairly safe" seats require a swing of between 6 and 10 per cent, while "marginal" seats require a swing of less than 6 per cent.

Government seats
Marginal
Wendouree	New seat	LIB	0.1%
Yan Yean	Danielle Green (ALP)	LIB	0.1%
Carrum	Donna Bauer	LIB	0.3%
Bentleigh	Elizabeth Miller	LIB	0.9%
Monbulk	James Merlino (ALP)	LIB	1.1%
Mordialloc	Lorraine Wreford	LIB	1.5%
Ripon	Joe Helper (ALP)	LIB	1.6%
Bellarine	Lisa Neville (ALP)	LIB	2.5%
Forest Hill	Neil Angus	LIB	3.5%
Prahran	Clem Newton-Brown	LIB	4.7%
South Barwon	Andrew Katos	LIB	4.9%
Fairly safe
Burwood	Graham Watt	LIB	6.3%
Ringwood	New seat	LIB	6.3%
Bayswater	Heidi Victoria	LIB	6.8%
Eildon	New seat	LIB	7.7%
Mount Waverley	Michael Gidley	LIB	8.6%
Gembrook	Brad Battin	LIB	8.8%
Box Hill	Robert Clark	LIB	9.4%
Hastings	Neale Burgess	LIB	9.6%
Caulfield	David Southwick	LIB	9.8%
Safe
Ferntree Gully	Nick Wakeling	LIB	11.5%
South-West Coast	Denis Napthine	LIB	11.9%
Croydon	New seat	LIB	12.2%
Bass	Ken Smith	LIB	12.4%
Evelyn	Christine Fyffe	LIB	12.6%
Rowville	New seat	LIB	13.1%
Morwell	Russell Northe	NAT	13.3%
Euroa	New seat	NAT	13.6%
Nepean	Martin Dixon	LIB	13.7%
Polwarth	Terry Mulder	LIB	13.8%
Brighton	Louise Asher	LIB	14.3%
Mildura	Peter Crisp	NAT	14.5%
Bulleen	Nicholas Kotsiras	LIB	15.1%
Sandringham	Murray Thompson	LIB	15.6%
Kew	Andrew McIntosh	LIB	15.7%
Benambra	Bill Tilley	LIB	15.9%
Narracan	Gary Blackwood	LIB	16.0%
Mornington	David Morris	LIB	16.2%
Hawthorn	Ted Baillieu	LIB	16.6%
Warrandyte	Ryan Smith	LIB	17.2%
Ovens Valley	New seat	NAT	19.2%
Very safe
Malvern	Michael O'Brien	LIB	20.5%
Lowan	Hugh Delahunty	NAT	21.9%
Gippsland South	Peter Ryan	NAT	22.5%
Gippsland East	Tim Bull	NAT	23.1%
Shepparton	Jeanette Powell	NAT	25.9%
Murray Plains	New seat	NAT	30.2%
Independent seats − Coalition confidence and supply
Frankston	Geoff Shaw	IND v ALP	2.1%

Non-government seats
Marginal
Eltham	Steve Herbert	ALP	0.8%
Albert Park	Martin Foley	ALP	0.9%
Cranbourne	Jude Perera	ALP	1.1%
Buninyong	New seat	ALP	1.6%
Ivanhoe	Anthony Carbines	ALP	1.8%
Macedon	Joanne Duncan	ALP	2.3%
Mulgrave	Daniel Andrews	ALP	2.4%
Bendigo West	Maree Edwards	ALP	3.1%
Bendigo East	Jacinta Allan	ALP	3.2%
Brunswick	Jane Garrett	ALP v GRN	3.6%
Geelong	Ian Trezise	ALP	4.0%
Essendon	Justin Madden	ALP	4.3%
Niddrie	Ben Carroll	ALP	4.5%
Melbourne	Jennifer Kanis	ALP v GRN	4.7%
Narre Warren North	Luke Donnellan	ALP	4.8%
Fairly safe
Oakleigh	Ann Barker	ALP	5.1%
Richmond	Richard Wynne	ALP v GRN	6.4%
Sunbury	New seat	ALP	6.5%
Narre Warren South	Judith Graley	ALP	7.4%
Keysborough	New seat	ALP	9.5%
Safe
Northcote	Fiona Richardson	ALP v GRN	10.3%
Bundoora	Colin Brooks	ALP	10.9%
Tarneit	Tim Pallas	ALP	11.0%
Werribee	New seat	ALP	11.4%
Sydenham	New seat	ALP	11.5%
Altona	Jill Hennessy	ALP	12.4%
Clarinda	New seat	ALP	12.4%
Williamstown	Wade Noonan	ALP	13.2%
Melton	Don Nardella	ALP	13.6%
Lara	John Eren	ALP	13.8%
Dandenong	John Pandazopoulos	ALP	14.0%
St Albans	New seat	ALP	14.0%
Footscray	Marsha Thomson	ALP	15.9%
Yuroke	Liz Beattie	ALP	16.0%
Mill Park	Lily D'Ambrosio	ALP	16.0%
Kororoit	Marlene Kairouz	ALP	17.5%
Pascoe Vale	Christine Campbell	ALP	18.5%
Broadmeadows	Frank McGuire	ALP	20.0%
Very safe
Preston	Robin Scott	ALP	20.2%
Thomastown	Bronwyn Halfpenny	ALP	21.6%

== See also ==
- Post-election pendulum for the 2010 Victorian state election
