= Electoral results for the district of Thomastown =

Victoria, Australia, district election results

This is a list of electoral results for the Electoral district of Thomastown in Victorian state elections.

== Members for Thomastown ==
Member	Party	Term
Beth Gleeson	Labor	1985–1989
Peter Batchelor	Labor	1990–2010
Bronwyn Halfpenny	Labor	2010–present

== Election results ==
=== Elections in the 2020s ===
2022 Victorian state election: Thomastown
Party	Candidate	Votes	%	±%
Labor	Bronwyn Halfpenny	19,396	51.7	−10.1
Liberal	Gurdawar Singh	9,003	24.0	+8.8
Victorian Socialists	Kelly Cvetkova	2,873	7.7	+4.8
Family First	Colleen McNamara	2,571	6.9	+6.9
Greens	Matt Sinapi	2,557	6.8	+2.7
Animal Justice	Evie Levens	1,076	2.9	+0.4
Total formal votes		37,476	92.3	+4.4
Informal votes		3,104	7.7	−4.4
Turnout		40,580	85.2	
Two-party-preferred result
Labor	Bronwyn Halfpenny	24,658	66.0	−11.4
Liberal	Gurdawar Singh	12,705	34.0	+11.4
Labor hold		Swing	−11.4	

=== Elections in the 2010s ===
2018 Victorian state election: Thomastown
Party	Candidate	Votes	%	±%
Labor	Bronwyn Halfpenny	17,653	62.8	−3.9
Liberal	Gurdawar Singh	4,191	14.9	−2.1
Independent	Nikola Stavreski	1,630	5.8	+5.8
Independent	Alahna Desiato	1,304	4.6	+4.6
Greens	Cynthia Smith	1,038	3.7	−1.5
Victorian Socialists	Kath Larkin	802	2.9	+2.9
Animal Justice	Tess Nagorka-Tsindos	589	2.1	+2.1
Independent	Ibrahim Saba	471	1.7	+1.7
Reason	David Thirkettle-Watts	425	1.5	+1.5
Total formal votes		28,103	87.5	−5.5
Informal votes		2,584	12.5	+5.5
Turnout		32,106	72.0	−19.7
Two-party-preferred result
Labor	Bronwyn Halfpenny	26,592	77.2	−1.2
Liberal	Gurdawar Singh	7,852	22.8	+1.2
Labor hold		Swing	−1.2	

2014 Victorian state election: Thomastown
Party	Candidate	Votes	%	±%
Labor	Bronwyn Halfpenny	22,786	66.7	+3.4
Liberal	Nitin Gursahani	5,801	17.0	−6.1
Family First	Trent Schneider-Johnson	2,047	6.0	+1.3
Greens	Ian Williamson	1,775	5.2	−3.2
Independent	Thomas Di Palma	1,753	5.1	+5.1
Total formal votes		34,162	93.0	+0.3
Informal votes		2,584	7.0	−0.3
Turnout		36,746	92.3	−1.5
Two-party-preferred result
Labor	Bronwyn Halfpenny	26,611	78.4	+6.8
Liberal	Nitin Gursahani	7,317	21.6	−6.8
Labor hold		Swing	+6.8	

2010 Victorian state election: Thomastown
Party	Candidate	Votes	%	±%
Labor	Bronwyn Halfpenny	19,190	61.29	−12.73
Liberal	Michael Burge	7,591	24.25	+9.47
Greens	Andrew Calleja	2,952	9.43	+2.87
Family First	Jacquie McIntosh	1,576	5.03	+0.39
Total formal votes		31,309	92.02	+0.14
Informal votes		2,716	7.98	−0.14
Turnout		34,025	92.33	−0.66
Two-party-preferred result
Labor	Bronwyn Halfpenny	22,025	70.19	−10.88
Liberal	Michael Burge	9,356	29.81	+10.88
Labor hold		Swing	−10.88	

=== Elections in the 2000s ===
2006 Victorian state election: Thomastown
Party	Candidate	Votes	%	±%
Labor	Peter Batchelor	23,058	74.0	−1.8
Liberal	Simon Coles	4,605	14.8	−1.8
Greens	Jen Hargrave	2,044	6.6	−1.0
Family First	Tim Rebbechi	1,444	4.6	+4.6
Total formal votes		31,151	91.9	−2.5
Informal votes		2,753	8.1	+2.5
Turnout		33,904	93.0	
Two-party-preferred result
Labor	Peter Batchelor	25,152	81.1	−0.6
Liberal	Simon Coles	5,872	18.9	+0.6
Labor hold		Swing	−0.6	

2002 Victorian state election: Thomastown
Party	Candidate	Votes	%	±%
Labor	Peter Batchelor	25,473	75.8	+2.0
Liberal	Adam Woolcock	5,561	16.6	−9.2
Greens	Zhivan Rendevski	2,562	7.6	+7.6
Total formal votes		33,596	94.4	−1.0
Informal votes		1,994	5.6	+1.0
Turnout		35,590	93.4	
Two-party-preferred result
Labor	Peter Batchelor	27,451	81.7	+7.6
Liberal	Adam Woolcock	6,132	18.3	−7.6
Labor hold		Swing	+7.6	

=== Elections in the 1990s ===
1999 Victorian state election: Thomastown
Party	Candidate	Votes	%	±%
Labor	Peter Batchelor	23,305	73.9	+3.0
Liberal	Michael Gidley	8,212	26.1	−1.3
Total formal votes		31,517	95.5	−1.0
Informal votes		1,479	4.5	+1.0
Turnout		32,996	93.2	
Labor hold		Swing	+1.9	

1996 Victorian state election: Thomastown
Party	Candidate	Votes	%	±%
Labor	Peter Batchelor	22,235	70.9	+13.6
Liberal	Anthony Bradstreet	8,561	27.3	+3.3
Natural Law	Lester O'Donnell	543	1.7	+1.7
Total formal votes		31,339	99.6	+7.7
Informal votes		114	0.4	−7.7
Turnout		31,453	91.6	
Two-party-preferred result
Labor	Peter Batchelor	22,556	72.0	+2.0
Liberal	Anthony Bradstreet	8,776	28.0	−2.0
Labor hold		Swing	+2.0	

1992 Victorian state election: Thomastown
Party	Candidate	Votes	%	±%
Labor	Peter Batchelor	16,592	57.4	−8.3
Liberal	Riza Kozanoglu	6,929	24.0	−1.6
Independent	Jim Thomev	3,097	10.7	+10.7
Independent	Christos Karamoshos	1,014	3.5	+3.5
Independent	Marianna Cuni	849	2.9	+2.9
Independent	Ken Mantell	428	1.5	+1.5
Total formal votes		28,909	91.9	+0.8
Informal votes		2,541	8.1	−0.8
Turnout		31,450	95.0	
Two-party-preferred result
Labor	Peter Batchelor	20,172	70.0	+0.9
Liberal	Riza Kozanoglu	8,648	30.0	−0.9
Labor hold		Swing	+0.9	

1990 Thomastown state by-election
Party	Candidate	Votes	%	±%
Labor	Peter Batchelor	13,873	48.52	−23.85
Liberal	Michael Fusco	6,574	22.99	−4.64
Democrats	Christine Craik	5,572	19.49	+19.49
Independent	Monica Harte	1,531	5.35	+5.35
Independent	Steve Pollock	645	2.26	+2.26
Independent	John Murray	243	0.85	+0.85
Independent	Earle Keegel	157	0.55	+0.55
Total formal votes		28,595	87.26	−4.65
Informal votes		4,174	12.74	+4.65
Turnout		32,769	90.76	−1.90
Two-party-preferred result
Labor	Peter Batchelor	15,335	53.68	−18.69
Democrats	Christine Craik	13,234	46.32	+46.32
Labor hold		Swing	−18.69	

=== Elections in the 1980s ===
1988 Victorian state election: Thomastown
Party	Candidate	Votes	%	±%
Labor	Beth Gleeson	21,324	72.37	−1.53
Liberal	Michael Fusco	8,141	27.63	+1.53
Total formal votes		29,465	91.91	−3.45
Informal votes		2,595	8.09	+3.45
Turnout		32,060	92.66	−1.83
Labor hold		Swing	−1.53	

1985 Victorian state election: Thomastown
Party	Candidate	Votes	%	±%
Labor	Beth Gleeson	19,802	73.9	−1.0
Liberal	Adam Barr	6,994	26.1	+11.4
Total formal votes		26,796	95.4	
Informal votes		1,303	4.6	
Turnout		28,099	94.5	
Labor hold		Swing	−6.6	
