= Post-election pendulum for the 2010 Victorian state election =

The following pendulum is known as the Mackerras pendulum, invented by psephologist Malcolm Mackerras. Designed for the outcome of the 2010 Victorian state election, the pendulum works by lining up all of the seats held in Parliament, according to the percentage point margin on a two candidate preferred basis. The two party result is also known as the swing required for the seat to change hands. Given a uniform swing to the opposition or government parties in an election, the number of seats that change hands can be predicted. Swing is never uniform, but in practice variations of swings usually tend to cancel each other out. "Safe" seats require a swing of over 10 per cent to change, "fairly safe" seats require a swing of between 6 and 10 per cent, while "marginal" seats require a swing of less than 6 per cent.

Government seats
Marginal
Bentleigh	Elizabeth Miller	LIB	0.8%
Seymour	Cindy McLeish	LIB	1.2%
Carrum	Donna Bauer	LIB	2.0%
Mordialloc	Lorraine Wreford	LIB	2.1%
Frankston	Geoff Shaw	LIB	2.1%
Mitcham	Dee Ryall	LIB	2.8%
Forest Hill	Neil Angus	LIB	3.2%
South Barwon	Andrew Katos	LIB	3.9%
Prahran	Clem Newton-Brown	LIB	4.3%
Burwood	Graham Watt	LIB	5.9%
Fairly safe
Gembrook	Brad Battin	LIB	6.8%
Mount Waverley	Michael Gidley	LIB	7.4%
Mildura	Peter Crisp	NAT v IND	9.2%
Safe
Shepparton	Jeanette Powell	NAT v CA	10.2%
Kilsyth	David Hodgett	LIB	10.4%
Bayswater	Heidi Victoria	LIB	10.6%
Hastings	Neale Burgess	LIB	10.8%
Caulfield	David Southwick	LIB	11.5%
South-West Coast	Denis Napthine	LIB	11.9%
Ferntree Gully	Nick Wakeling	LIB	12.0%
Gippsland East	Tim Bull	NAT v IND	12.0%
Narracan	Gary Blackwood	LIB	12.4%
Bass	Ken Smith	LIB	12.6%
Polwarth	Terry Mulder	LIB	13.3%
Evelyn	Christine Fyffe	LIB	13.5%
Box Hill	Robert Clark	LIB	13.8%
Warrandyte	Ryan Smith	LIB	13.9%
Scoresby	Kim Wells	LIB	14.1%
Nepean	Martin Dixon	LIB	14.3%
Bulleen	Nicholas Kotsiras	LIB	14.7%
Kew	Andrew McIntosh	LIB	15.2%
Sandringham	Murray Thompson	LIB	15.9%
Mornington	David Morris	LIB	16.0%
Morwell	Russell Northe	NAT	16.3%
Benambra	Bill Tilley	LIB	16.5%
Hawthorn	Ted Baillieu	LIB	16.7%
Brighton	Louise Asher	LIB	17.6%
Doncaster	Mary Wooldridge	LIB	17.6%
Murray Valley	Tim McCurdy	NAT	19.0%
Very safe
Malvern	Michael O'Brien	LIB	20.4%
Lowan	Hugh Delahunty	NAT	22.1%
Gippsland South	Peter Ryan	NAT	22.6%
Benalla	Bill Sykes	NAT	23.1%
Rodney	Paul Weller	NAT	26.2%
Swan Hill	Peter Walsh	NAT	29.3%

Non-government seats
Marginal
Eltham	Steve Herbert	ALP	0.8%
Ballarat West	Sharon Knight	ALP	1.1%
Macedon	Joanne Duncan	ALP	1.3%
Bellarine	Lisa Neville	ALP	1.4%
Ballarat East	Geoff Howard	ALP	1.5%
Ivanhoe	Anthony Carbines	ALP	1.7%
Cranbourne	Jude Perera	ALP	1.8%
Monbulk	James Merlino	ALP	1.9%
Albert Park	Martin Foley	ALP	2.0%
Geelong	Ian Trezise	ALP	2.1%
Essendon	Justin Madden	ALP	2.4%
Ripon	Joe Helper	ALP	2.7%
Bendigo West	Maree Edwards	ALP	2.9%
Narre Warren North	Luke Donnellan	ALP	3.0%
Brunswick	Jane Garrett	ALP v GRN	3.3%
Bendigo East	Jacinta Allan	ALP	3.8%
Yan Yean	Danielle Green	ALP	4.1%
Oakleigh	Ann Barker	ALP	4.8%
Fairly safe
Melbourne	Bronwyn Pike	ALP v GRN	6.2%
Richmond	Richard Wynne	ALP v GRN	6.2%
Narre Warren South	Judith Graley	ALP	6.7%
Niddrie	Rob Hulls	ALP	6.9%
Bundoora	Colin Brooks	ALP	7.6%
Mulgrave	Daniel Andrews	ALP	8.5%
Safe
Keilor	Natalie Hutchins	ALP	10.3%
Northcote	Fiona Richardson	ALP v GRN	10.7%
Tarneit	Tim Pallas	ALP	11.1%
Williamstown	Wade Noonan	ALP	11.8%
Altona	Jill Hennessy	ALP	12.0%
Melton	Don Nardella	ALP	12.8%
Dandenong	John Pandazopoulos	ALP	13.9%
Lyndhurst	Tim Holding	ALP	13.9%
Derrimut	Telmo Languiller	ALP	14.4%
Yuroke	Liz Beattie	ALP	15.3%
Clayton	Hong Lim	ALP	15.3%
Lara	John Eren	ALP	15.4%
Footscray	Marsha Thomson	ALP	16.2%
Pascoe Vale	Christine Campbell	ALP	17.8%
Kororoit	Marlene Kairouz	ALP	18.6%
Mill Park	Lily D'Ambrosio	ALP	19.5%
Very safe
Thomastown	Bronwyn Halfpenny	ALP	20.2%
Preston	Robin Scott	ALP	20.4%
Broadmeadows	John Brumby	ALP	21.0%

== See also ==
- Pre-election pendulum for the 2014 Victorian state election
