= Electoral results for the district of Carrum =

Victoria, Australia, district election results

This is a list of electoral results for the Electoral district of Carrum in Victorian state elections.

== Members for Carrum ==
Member	Party	Term
Ian Cathie	Labor	1976–1988
Mal Sandon	Labor	1988–1996
David Lean	Liberal	1996–1999
Jenny Lindell	Labor	1999–2010
Donna Bauer	Liberal	2010–2014
Sonya Kilkenny	Labor	2014–present

== Election results ==
=== Elections in the 2020s ===
2022 Victorian state election: Carrum
Party	Candidate	Votes	%	±%
Labor	Sonya Kilkenny	21,586	49.9	−3.1
Liberal	Bec Buchanan	13,141	30.3	−2.3
Greens	Jayde Lillico	3,282	7.6	+2.1
Freedom	Georgia Erevnidis	1,750	4.0	+4.0
Family First	Jeremy Cameron	1,354	3.1	+3.1
Animal Justice	Taylor Macgregor Owen	1,201	2.8	+2.8
Independent	Damian Willis	986	2.3	+2.3
Total formal votes		43,294	95.2	+1.1
Informal votes		2,183	4.8	−1.1
Turnout		45,477	88.7	−1.7
Two-party-preferred result
Labor	Sonya Kilkenny	25,871	59.8	−2.2
Liberal	Bec Buchanan	17,423	40.2	+2.2
Labor hold		Swing	−2.2	

=== Elections in the 2010s ===
2018 Victorian state election: Carrum
Party	Candidate	Votes	%	±%
Labor	Sonya Kilkenny	21,844	52.7	+6.5
Liberal	Donna Bauer	13,608	32.9	−9.3
Greens	Braeden Thompson	2,432	5.9	−1.7
Justice	Simone Philpott-Smart	1,822	4.4	+4.4
Democratic Labor	Jennifer Bowden	696	1.7	+1.7
Transport Matters	Santosh Kumar Yadav	585	1.4	+1.4
Independent	Michael Tellesson	433	1.1	+1.1
Total formal votes		41,420	94.1	−0.8
Informal votes		2,618	5.9	+0.8
Turnout		44,038	90.4	−2.8
Two-party-preferred result
Labor	Sonya Kilkenny	25,660	62.0	+11.3
Liberal	Donna Bauer	15,761	38.0	−11.3
Labor hold		Swing	+11.3	

2014 Victorian state election: Carrum
Party	Candidate	Votes	%	±%
Liberal	Donna Bauer	17,802	45.2	+1.6
Labor	Sonya Kilkenny	16,645	42.2	+2.0
Greens	Henry Kelsall	2,989	7.6	−1.6
Family First	Richard Vernay	1,281	3.2	+0.6
Rise Up Australia	Margaret Quinn	708	1.8	+1.8
Total formal votes		39,425	94.9	+0.3
Informal votes		2,126	5.1	−0.3
Turnout		41,551	93.2	+2.9
Two-party-preferred result
Labor	Sonya Kilkenny	19,998	50.7	+1.0
Liberal	Donna Bauer	19,427	49.3	−1.0
Labor gain from Liberal		Swing	+1.0	

2010 Victorian state election: Carrum
Party	Candidate	Votes	%	±%
Liberal	Donna Bauer	17,539	46.37	+8.27
Labor	Jenny Lindell	14,430	38.15	−9.77
Greens	Henry Kelsall	3,593	9.50	+0.60
Family First	John Churchwood	939	2.48	−1.10
Democratic Labor	Ewa Losinski	873	2.31	+2.31
Independent	Steven Garland	447	1.18	+1.18
Total formal votes		37,821	95.36	+0.08
Informal votes		1,840	4.64	−0.08
Turnout		39,661	93.51	+0.14
Two-party-preferred result
Liberal	Donna Bauer	19,765	52.21	+8.90
Labor	Jenny Lindell	18,093	47.79	−8.90
Liberal gain from Labor		Swing	+8.90	

=== Elections in the 2000s ===
2006 Victorian state election: Carrum
Party	Candidate	Votes	%	±%
Labor	Jenny Lindell	16,846	47.92	−5.07
Liberal	Jeff Shelley	13,392	38.10	+3.09
Greens	Carlos Lopez	3,128	8.90	−1.61
Family First	Michael McLean	1,259	3.58	+3.58
Independent	Ronnie Musster	270	0.77	+0.77
Independent	Alan Thompson	259	0.74	+0.74
Total formal votes		35,154	95.28	−1.68
Informal votes		1,741	4.72	+1.68
Turnout		36,895	93.37	−0.04
Two-party-preferred result
Labor	Jenny Lindell	19,968	56.69	−5.47
Liberal	Jeff Shelley	15,256	43.31	+5.47
Labor hold		Swing	−5.47	

2002 Victorian state election: Carrum
Party	Candidate	Votes	%	±%
Labor	Jenny Lindell	18,654	53.0	+5.5
Liberal	Ross MacInnes	12,325	35.0	−11.6
Greens	Darren Bujeya	3,700	10.5	+4.9
Independent	Michael Good	525	1.5	+1.5
Total formal votes		35,204	97.0	−0.2
Informal votes		1,103	3.0	+0.2
Turnout		36,307	93.4	
Two-party-preferred result
Labor	Jenny Lindell	21,873	62.2	+10.5
Liberal	Ross MacInnes	13,315	37.8	−10.5
Labor hold		Swing	+10.5	

=== Elections in the 1990s ===
1999 Victorian state election: Carrum
Party	Candidate	Votes	%	±%
Liberal	David Lean	16,770	48.2	−1.1
Labor	Jenny Lindell	16,099	46.3	+0.4
Greens	Dan Bray	1,896	5.5	+5.5
Total formal votes		34,765	97.5	−0.5
Informal votes		899	2.5	+0.5
Turnout		35,664	93.5	
Two-party-preferred result
Labor	Jenny Lindell	17,444	50.2	+1.0
Liberal	David Lean	17,321	49.8	−1.0
Labor gain from Liberal		Swing	+1.0	

1996 Victorian state election: Carrum
Party	Candidate	Votes	%	±%
Liberal	David Lean	16,248	49.3	+2.6
Labor	Mal Sandon	15,123	45.9	+1.3
Independent	Keith Edwards	931	2.8	+2.8
Natural Law	Bev Brain	632	1.9	−1.1
Total formal votes		32,934	98.0	+1.7
Informal votes		670	2.0	−1.7
Turnout		33,604	94.2	
Two-party-preferred result
Liberal	David Lean	16,703	50.8	+1.7
Labor	Mal Sandon	16,189	49.2	−1.7
Liberal gain from Labor		Swing	+1.7	

1992 Victorian state election: Carrum
Party	Candidate	Votes	%	±%
Liberal	John Robinson	14,374	46.7	+4.2
Labor	Mal Sandon	13,708	44.6	−11.2
Independent	Merran Jones	1,046	3.4	+3.4
Natural Law	Bev Nelson	931	3.0	+3.0
Independent	Mark Dunn	478	1.6	+1.6
Independent	Mark Williams	213	0.7	+0.7
Total formal votes		30,750	96.4	+0.0
Informal votes		1,163	3.6	−0.0
Turnout		31,913	95.4	
Two-party-preferred result
Labor	Mal Sandon	15,598	50.9	−5.7
Liberal	John Robinson	15,058	49.1	+5.7
Labor hold		Swing	−5.7	

=== Elections in the 1980s ===
1988 Victorian state election: Carrum
Party	Candidate	Votes	%	±%
Labor	Mal Sandon	15,308	57.49	−1.94
Liberal	Marie McIntosh	11,320	42.51	+1.94
Total formal votes		26,628	95.94	−1.29
Informal votes		1,127	4.06	+1.29
Turnout		27,755	91.64	−1.47
Labor hold		Swing	−1.94	

1985 Victorian state election: Carrum
Party	Candidate	Votes	%	±%
Labor	Ian Cathie	15,440	59.4	+0.5
Liberal	Bruce Bowie	10,540	40.6	+2.3
Total formal votes		25,980	97.2	
Informal votes		740	2.8	
Turnout		26,720	93.1	
Labor hold		Swing	−1.5	

1982 Victorian state election: Carrum
Party	Candidate	Votes	%	±%
Labor	Ian Cathie	17,786	62.7	+7.2
Liberal	Derek Bunyan	9,599	33.8	−1.3
Democrats	William Towers	999	3.5	−5.0
Total formal votes		28,384	97.0	−0.3
Informal votes		837	3.0	+0.3
Turnout		29,221	93.2	0.0
Two-party-preferred result
Labor	Ian Cathie	18,360	64.7	+2.8
Liberal	Derek Bunyan	10,024	35.3	−2.8
Labor hold		Swing	+2.8	

=== Elections in the 1970s ===
1979 Victorian state election: Carrum
Party	Candidate	Votes	%	±%
Labor	Ian Cathie	15,198	55.5	+0.5
Liberal	Hugh Falconer	9,613	35.1	−9.9
Democrats	Wendy Kleeman	2,321	8.5	+8.5
Australia	Brenda Heath	250	0.9	+0.9
Total formal votes		27,382	97.3	+0.1
Informal votes		750	2.7	−0.1
Turnout		28,132	93.2	+1.2
Two-party-preferred result
Labor	Ian Cathie	16,936	61.9	+6.9
Liberal	Hugh Falconer	10,446	38.1	−6.9
Labor hold		Swing	+6.9	

1976 Victorian state election: Carrum
Party	Candidate	Votes	%	±%
Labor	Ian Cathie	14,137	55.0	+3.7
Liberal	Allan Coombes	11,572	45.0	+5.4
Total formal votes		25,709	97.2	
Informal votes		731	2.8	
Turnout		26,440	92.0	
Labor hold		Swing	+1.1	
