= Electoral results for the district of St Albans =

Victoria, Australia, district election results

This is a list of electoral results for the Electoral district of St Albans in Victorian state elections.

== Members for St Albans ==
First incarnation (1985–1992)
Member	Party	Term
Alex Andrianopoulos	Labor	1985–1992

Second incarnation (2014–present)
Member	Party	Term
Natalie Suleyman	Labor	2014–present

== Election results ==
=== Elections in the 2020s ===
==== 2022 ====
2022 Victorian state election: St Albans
Party	Candidate	Votes	%	±%
Labor	Natalie Suleyman	15,094	42.3	−18.4
Liberal	Maria Kerr	9,066	25.4	+1.4
Democratic Labour	Mark Hobart	2,735	7.7	+7.7
Greens	Joel Bentley	2,416	6.8	−4.5
Victorian Socialists	Van Thanh Rudd	2,367	6.6	+6.6
Independent	Virginia Tachos	1,152	3.2	+3.2
Family First	Russell Walton	1,038	2.9	+2.9
Freedom	Kim J. Cullen	874	2.4	+2.4
Animal Justice	Jason Caracassis	782	2.2	+1.2
New Democrats	Zaffer Mannan	192	0.5	+0.5
Total formal votes		35,716	90.8	−1.9
Informal votes		3,638	9.2	+1.9
Turnout		39,354	84.7	−1.6
Two-party-preferred result
Labor	Natalie Suleyman	21,274	59.6	−12.4
Liberal	Maria Kerr	14,442	40.4	+12.4
Labor hold		Swing	−12.4	

=== Elections in the 2010s ===
==== 2018 ====
2018 Victorian state election: St Albans
Party	Candidate	Votes	%	±%
Labor	Natalie Suleyman	22,355	59.67	+3.27
Liberal	Trung Luu	9,116	24.33	−2.55
Greens	Cylene Magri	4,600	12.28	+3.13
Independent	Jenny Isa	1,393	3.72	+3.72
Total formal votes		37,464	92.75	+0.58
Informal votes		2,927	7.25	−0.58
Turnout		40,391	86.53	−3.02
Two-party-preferred result
Labor	Natalie Suleyman	26,326	71.54	+4.04
Liberal	Trung Luu	10,475	28.46	−4.04
Labor hold		Swing	+4.04	

==== 2014 ====
2014 Victorian state election: St Albans
Party	Candidate	Votes	%	±%
Labor	Natalie Suleyman	21,435	56.4	+5.0
Liberal	Moira Deeming	10,215	26.9	+0.4
Greens	Lisa Asbury	3,475	9.1	−4.1
Voice for the West	Pat Aumua	1,424	3.8	+3.7
Christians	Marvet Boulos	1,080	2.8	+2.8
Independent	Irena Teresa Klajn	374	1.0	+1.0
Total formal votes		38,003	92.2	+0.1
Informal votes		3,228	7.8	−0.1
Turnout		41,231	89.6	−1.4
Two-party-preferred result
Labor	Natalie Suleyman	25,711	67.5	+3.5
Liberal	Moira Deeming	12,381	32.5	−3.5
Labor hold		Swing	+3.5	

=== Elections in the 1980s ===
==== 1988 ====
1988 Victorian state election: St Albans
Party	Candidate	Votes	%	±%
Labor	Alex Andrianopoulos	16,296	59.94	−11.03
Liberal	George Korytsky	7,582	27.89	−1.14
Independent	Peter Portelli	3,308	12.17	+12.17
Total formal votes		27,186	90.28	−3.54
Informal votes		2,928	9.72	+3.54
Turnout		30,114	92.07	−1.35
Two-party-preferred result
Labor	Alex Andrianopoulos	17,041	62.71	−8.26
Liberal	George Korytsky	10,132	37.29	+8.26
Labor hold		Swing	−8.26	

==== 1985 ====
1985 Victorian state election: St Albans
Party	Candidate	Votes	%	±%
Labor	Alex Andrianopoulos	19,642	71.0	−5.1
Liberal	Martin Power	8,033	29.0	+6.4
Total formal votes		27,675	93.8	
Informal votes		1,823	6.2	
Turnout		29,498	93.4	
Labor hold		Swing	−6.2	
