= Electoral results for the district of Mill Park =

Victoria, Australia, district election results

This is a list of electoral results for the Electoral district of Mill Park in Victorian state elections.

== Members for Mill Park ==
Member	Party	Term
Alex Andrianopoulos	Labor	1992–2002
Lily D'Ambrosio	Labor	2002–present

== Election results ==
=== 2022 ===
2022 Victorian state election: Mill Park
Party	Candidate	Votes	%	±%
Labor	Lily D'Ambrosio	18,857	49.9	−12.8
Liberal	Paige Yap	9,797	25.9	+4.6
Greens	Chris Kearney	2,761	7.3	+2.0
Freedom	Andrew Filippopoulos	2,658	7.0	+7.0
Family First	Craig Anderson	1,891	5.0	+5.0
Animal Justice	Marcia Simons	1,833	4.9	−1.9
Total formal votes		37,793	93.8	+0.6
Informal votes		2,515	6.2	−0.5
Turnout		40,308	87.8	−0.8
Two-party-preferred result
Labor	Lily D'Ambrosio	23,274	61.6	–13.3
Liberal	Paige Yap	14,519	38.4	+13.3
Labor hold		Swing	–13.3	

=== 2018 ===
2018 Victorian state election: Mill Park
Party	Candidate	Votes	%	±%
Labor	Lily D'Ambrosio	24,729	62.71	+2.92
Liberal	Lakhwinder Singh	8,421	21.36	−5.69
Animal Justice	Marcia Simons	2,655	6.73	+6.73
Greens	Alexander Edwards	2,088	5.30	−1.63
Victorian Socialists	Nicholas Reich	1,540	3.91	+3.91
Total formal votes		39,433	93.26	−1.04
Informal votes		2,849	6.74	+1.04
Turnout		42,282	90.98	−3.17
Two-party-preferred result
Labor	Lily D'Ambrosio	29,588	74.90	+5.04
Liberal	Lakhwinder Singh	9,918	25.11	−5.04
Labor hold		Swing	+5.04	

=== 2014 ===
2014 Victorian state election: Mill Park
Party	Candidate	Votes	%	±%
Labor	Lily D'Ambrosio	22,807	59.8	+1.7
Liberal	George Varughese	10,317	27.1	−0.9
Greens	Jeremy Graham	2,640	6.9	−0.1
Family First	Peter Simmons	2,383	6.3	+1.3
Total formal votes		38,147	94.3	+0.3
Informal votes		2,306	5.7	−0.3
Turnout		40,453	94.1	+8.0
Two-party-preferred result
Labor	Lily D'Ambrosio	26,314	69.9	+2.9
Liberal	George Varughese	11,356	30.1	−2.9
Labor hold		Swing	+2.9	

=== 2010 ===
2010 Victorian state election: Mill Park
Party	Candidate	Votes	%	±%
Labor	Lily D'Ambrosio	21,861	60.89	−1.16
Liberal	Peter Chugha	9,537	26.56	+4.30
Greens	Gurm Sekhon	2,605	7.26	+1.22
Family First	Phillip Cogger	1,901	5.29	−2.20
Total formal votes		35,904	93.66	−0.74
Informal votes		2,430	6.34	+0.74
Turnout		38,334	93.42	−1.31
Two-party-preferred result
Labor	Lily D'Ambrosio	24,966	69.45	−1.34
Liberal	Peter Chugha	10,982	30.55	+1.34
Labor hold		Swing	−1.34	

=== 2006 ===
2006 Victorian state election: Mill Park
Party	Candidate	Votes	%	±%
Labor	Lily D'Ambrosio	21,288	62.0	−8.1
Liberal	Adam Papaevangelou	7,637	22.3	+1.3
Family First	Carmel McLeod	2,571	7.5	+7.5
Greens	Benedict Hughes	2,071	6.0	−0.2
People Power	Christine Stow	741	2.2	+2.2
Total formal votes		34,308	94.4	−1.2
Informal votes		2,036	5.6	+1.2
Turnout		36,344	94.7	
Two-party-preferred result
Labor	Lily D'Ambrosio	24,276	70.8	−6.0
Liberal	Adam Papaevangelou	10,018	29.2	+6.0
Labor hold		Swing	−6.0	

=== 2002 ===
2002 Victorian state election: Mill Park
Party	Candidate	Votes	%	±%
Labor	Lily D'Ambrosio	22,746	70.1	+7.5
Liberal	Lucas Kostadinoski	6,815	21.0	−13.9
Greens	Berhan Ahmed	2,014	6.2	+6.2
Democrats	Brian Mawhinney	878	2.7	+2.7
Total formal votes		32,453	95.6	−0.7
Informal votes		1,484	4.4	+0.7
Turnout		33,937	94.5	
Two-party-preferred result
Labor	Lily D'Ambrosio	24,915	76.8	+13.0
Liberal	Lucas Kostadinoski	7,536	23.2	−13.0
Labor hold		Swing	+13.0	

=== 1999 ===
1999 Victorian state election: Mill Park
Party	Candidate	Votes	%	±%
Labor	Alex Andrianopoulos	24,307	64.6	+4.5
Liberal	Andrew Davenport	12,405	33.0	+1.0
Natural Law	Rosie D'Angelo	924	2.5	+0.9
Total formal votes		37,636	96.1	−0.4
Informal votes		1,541	3.9	+0.4
Turnout		39,177	94.5	
Two-party-preferred result
Labor	Alex Andrianopoulos	24,772	65.8	+1.9
Liberal	Andrew Davenport	12,864	34.2	−1.9
Labor hold		Swing	+1.9	

=== 1996 ===
1996 Victorian state election: Mill Park
Party	Candidate	Votes	%	±%
Labor	Alex Andrianopoulos	20,224	60.1	+10.1
Liberal	Jock Burns	10,769	32.0	+3.9
Independent	Jordan Gruev	1,812	5.4	+5.4
Natural Law	Paul D'Angelo	513	1.5	+1.5
Independent	Roy Mason	346	1.0	+1.0
Total formal votes		33,664	96.4	+1.5
Informal votes		1,244	3.6	−1.5
Turnout		34,908	95.0	
Two-party-preferred result
Labor	Alex Andrianopoulos	21,505	63.9	+1.6
Liberal	Jock Burns	12,125	36.1	−1.6
Labor hold		Swing	+1.6	

=== 1992 ===
1992 Victorian state election: Mill Park
Party	Candidate	Votes	%	±%
Labor	Alex Andrianopoulos	14,722	50.0	−18.4
Liberal	Anthony Fernandez	8,265	28.1	+0.1
Independent	Christine Craik	4,267	14.5	+14.5
Independent	Janko Georgievski	2,199	7.5	+7.5
Total formal votes		29,453	94.9	+1.7
Informal votes		1,567	5.1	+1.7
Turnout		31,020	96.1	
Two-party-preferred result
Labor	Alex Andrianopoulos	18,318	62.3	−8.4
Liberal	Anthony Fernandez	11,065	37.7	+8.4
Labor hold		Swing	−8.4	
