= Results of the 1988 Victorian state election (Legislative Council) =

Australian state election results

Victorian state election, 1 October 1988 Legislative Council << 1985–1992 >>
Enrolled voters	2,739,614				
Votes cast	2,529,569		Turnout	92.33	–0.86
Informal votes	109,578		Informal	4.33	+1.32
Summary of votes by party
Party	Primary votes	%	Swing	Seats won	Seats held
Labor	1,164,796	48.13	+0.85	9	19
Liberal	1,052,591	43.50	+2.35	10	19
National	181,074	7.48	+0.81	3	6
Call to Australia	5,363	0.22	–0.49	0	0
Independent	16,167	0.67	+0.45	0	0
Total	2,419,991			22	44

This is a list of Legislative Council results for the Victorian 1988 state election. 22 of the 44 seats were contested.

== Results by province ==
=== Ballarat ===
1988 Victorian state election: Ballarat Province
Party	Candidate	Votes	%	±%
Liberal	Rob Knowles	59,963	49.2	+0.2
Labor	Glendon Ludbrook	53,807	44.1	+0.1
National	Anne Scott	8,170	6.7	+6.7
Total formal votes		121,940	97.5	−0.5
Informal votes		3,143	2.5	+0.5
Turnout		125,083	94.2	−0.7
Two-party-preferred result
Liberal	Rob Knowles	66,508	54.5	+3.6
Labor	Glendon Ludbrook	55,429	45.5	−3.6
Liberal hold		Swing	+3.6	

=== Boronia ===
1988 Victorian state election: Boronia Province
Party	Candidate	Votes	%	±%
Liberal	Gerald Ashman	56,754	51.2	+3.2
Labor	Judith Dixon	54,133	48.8	+3.2
Total formal votes		110,887	96.1	−1.4
Informal votes		4,514	3.9	+1.4
Turnout		115,401	94.2	−0.8
Liberal gain from Labor		Swing	+1.7	

=== Central Highlands ===
1988 Victorian state election: Central Highlands Province
Party	Candidate	Votes	%	±%
Labor	Andre Haermeyer	54,233	45.2	+2.6
Liberal	Geoff Craige	49,442	41.2	−5.5
National	Ted Drane	16,319	13.6	+13.6
Total formal votes		119,994	96.9	−0.8
Informal votes		3,876	3.1	+0.8
Turnout		123,870	93.2	−0.1
Two-party-preferred result
Liberal	Geoff Craige	62,153	51.8	−1.5
Labor	Andre Haermeyer	50,958	48.2	+1.5
Liberal hold		Swing	−1.5	

=== Chelsea ===
1988 Victorian state election: Chelsea Province
Party	Candidate	Votes	%	±%
Labor	Burwyn Davidson	54,959	50.5	−1.7
Liberal	Michael O'Brien	49,707	45.7	−2.1
Independent	Ken Glyde	4,074	3.8	+3.8
Total formal votes		108,740	96.0	−1.0
Informal votes		4,562	4.0	+1.0
Turnout		113,302	92.4	−0.8
Two-party-preferred result
Labor	Burwyn Davidson	57,092	52.5	+0.3
Liberal	Michael O'Brien	51,171	47.8	−0.3
Labor hold		Swing	+0.3	

=== Doutta Galla ===
1988 Victorian state election: Doutta Galla Province
Party	Candidate	Votes	%	±%
Labor	Bill Landeryou	66,700	58.9	−5.0
Liberal	Graeme Cameron	46,629	41.1	+5.0
Total formal votes		113,329	92.3	−2.9
Informal votes		9,463	7.7	+2.9
Turnout		122,792	92.7	−1.5
Labor hold		Swing	−5.0	

=== East Yarra ===
1988 Victorian state election: East Yarra Province
Party	Candidate	Votes	%	±%
Liberal	Haddon Storey	62,522	60.3	+2.3
Labor	Terry Monagle	41,217	39.7	+5.4
Total formal votes		103,739	96.6	−1.1
Informal votes		3,604	3.4	+1.1
Turnout		107,343	90.8	−1.2
Liberal hold		Swing	−1.5	

=== Eumemmerring ===
1988 Victorian state election: Eumemmerring Province
Party	Candidate	Votes	%	±%
Labor	Bob Ives	62,602	56.5	−3.3
Liberal	Janice Bateman	48,166	43.5	+3.3
Total formal votes		110,768	92.9	−2.5
Informal votes		8,449	7.1	+2.5
Turnout		119,217	92.2	−1.3
Labor hold		Swing	−3.3	

=== Geelong ===
1988 Victorian state election: Geelong Province
Party	Candidate	Votes	%	±%
Labor	David Henshaw	54,291	48.4	−4.7
Liberal	John Lucas	47,838	42.7	+0.9
Call to Australia	Dirk Terpstra	5,363	4.8	+4.8
Independent	James Jordan	4,623	4.1	+4.1
Total formal votes		112,115	96.5	−1.0
Informal votes		4,108	3.5	+1.0
Turnout		116,223	93.1	−1.1
Two-party-preferred result
Labor	David Henshaw	57,218	51.1	−4.6
Liberal	John Lucas	54,857	48.9	+4.6
Labor hold		Swing	−4.6	

=== Gippsland ===
1988 Victorian state election: Gippsland Province
Party	Candidate	Votes	%	±%
Labor	Alan Hollway	42,209	37.5	+0.5
National	Peter Hall	33,108	29.4	+3.7
Liberal	James Taylor	32,110	28.5	−0.2
Independent	Glen Mann	3,178	2.8	+2.8
Independent	Bruce Ingle	1,947	1.7	+1.7
Total formal votes		112,552	97.1	−0.6
Informal votes		3,367	2.9	+0.6
Turnout		115,919	93.6	+0.1
Two-party-preferred result
National	Peter Hall	65,204	58.0	+58.0
Labor	Alan Hollway	47,223	42.0	−0.9
National gain from Liberal		Swing	N/A	

=== Higinbotham ===
1988 Victorian state election: Higinbotham Province
Party	Candidate	Votes	%	±%
Liberal	Geoffrey Connard	58,905	57.1	+4.7
Labor	Kevin McCosh	44,283	42.9	+1.7
Total formal votes		103,188	96.3	−0.9
Informal votes		4,011	3.7	+0.9
Turnout		107,199	91.6	−0.8
Liberal hold		Swing	+1.5	

=== Jika Jika ===
1988 Victorian state election: Jika Jika Province
Party	Candidate	Votes	%	±%
Labor	Theo Theophanous	67,052	65.4	−2.5
Liberal	John Badham	35,467	34.6	+2.5
Total formal votes		102,519	93.1	−2.4
Informal votes		7,559	6.9	+2.4
Turnout		110,078	91.5	−1.0
Labor hold		Swing	−2.5	

=== Melbourne ===
1988 Victorian state election: Melbourne Province
Party	Candidate	Votes	%	±%
Labor	Barry Pullen	63,140	66.0	+2.8
Liberal	Katherine Edgar	32,562	34.0	+3.5
Total formal votes		95,702	93.4	−2.0
Informal votes		6,759	6.6	+2.0
Turnout		102,461	87.0	−1.6
Labor hold		Swing	−0.4	

=== Melbourne North ===
1988 Victorian state election: Melbourne North Province
Party	Candidate	Votes	%	±%
Labor	Caroline Hogg	66,350	65.4	−2.2
Liberal	Simon St John	35,182	34.6	+2.2
Total formal votes		101,532	93.0	−2.2
Informal votes		7,652	7.0	+2.2
Turnout		109,184	91.7	−2.0
Labor hold		Swing	−2.2	

=== Melbourne West ===
1988 Victorian state election: Melbourne West Province
Party	Candidate	Votes	%	±%
Labor	Licia Kokocinski	69,482	63.4	+0.5
Liberal	Darren Olney	40,123	36.6	+7.6
Total formal votes		109,605	92.9	−2.8
Informal votes		8,399	7.1	+2.8
Turnout		118,004	91.6	−0.9
Labor hold		Swing	−3.5	

=== Monash ===
1988 Victorian state election: Monash Province
Party	Candidate	Votes	%	±%
Liberal	James Guest	48,378	50.8	+2.0
Labor	Perce White	46,919	49.2	+3.7
Total formal votes		95,297	95.5	−1.4
Informal votes		4,465	4.5	+1.4
Turnout		99,762	87.2	−1.8
Liberal hold		Swing	+0.2	

=== North Eastern ===
1988 Victorian state election: North Eastern Province
Party	Candidate	Votes	%	±%
National	David Evans	55,467	47.8	−3.2
Labor	Ewan Paterson	31,793	27.4	+2.7
Liberal	Ian Cumming	28,799	24.8	+3.4
Total formal votes		116,059	97.6	−0.1
Informal votes		2,854	2.4	+0.1
Turnout		118,913	93.0	−0.5
Two-party-preferred result
National	David Evans	82,492	71.1	+2.3
Labor	Ewan Paterson	33,559	28.9	−2.3
National hold		Swing	+2.3	

=== North Western ===
1988 Victorian state election: North Western Province
Party	Candidate	Votes	%	±%
National	Ron Best	42,721	37.6	0.0
Labor	Linda Freedman	39,252	34.5	+1.4
Liberal	Derek Bowman	31,705	27.9	−1.4
Total formal votes		113,678	97.7	−0.5
Informal votes		2,640	2.3	+0.5
Turnout		116,318	93.3	−1.0
Two-party-preferred result
National	Ron Best	71,164	62.6	0.0
Labor	Linda Freedman	42,514	37.4	0.0
National hold		Swing	0.0	

=== Nunawading ===
1988 Victorian state election: Nunawading Province
Party	Candidate	Votes	%	±%
Liberal	George Cox	56,764	51.1	+5.0
Labor	Laurie McArthur	54,308	48.9	+3.1
Total formal votes		111,072	96.7	−1.0
Informal votes		3,782	3.3	+1.0
Turnout		114,854	93.4	−0.6
Liberal gain from Labor		Swing	+1.1	

=== South Eastern ===
1988 Victorian state election: South Eastern Province
Party	Candidate	Votes	%	±%
Liberal	Ken Smith	70,536	54.8	+1.6
Labor	Denise Hassett	58,245	45.2	+4.7
Total formal votes		128,781	96.7	−1.1
Informal votes		4,375	3.3	+1.1
Turnout		133,156	93.1	−0.6
Liberal hold		Swing	−1.5	

=== Templestowe ===
1988 Victorian state election: Templestowe Province
Party	Candidate	Votes	%	±%
Liberal	Bruce Skeggs	59,288	52.5	+2.8
Labor	Mike Arnold	53,664	47.5	+5.5
Total formal votes		112,952	96.1	−1.4
Informal votes		4,586	3.9	+1.4
Turnout		117,538	93.3	−0.6
Liberal hold		Swing	−0.3	

=== Waverley ===
1988 Victorian state election: Waverley Province
Party	Candidate	Votes	%	±%
Labor	Brian Mier	56,169	53.7	+4.8
Liberal	Savvas Grigoropoulos	48,381	46.3	+5.0
Total formal votes		104,550	95.3	−1.6
Informal votes		5,157	4.7	+1.6
Turnout		109,707	92.7	−1.1
Labor hold		Swing	−0.9	

=== Western ===
1988 Victorian state election: Western Province
Party	Candidate	Votes	%	±%
Liberal	Bruce Chamberlain	53,370	48.1	+6.8
Labor	Kevin Watt	29,988	27.0	−0.6
National	James Saunders	25,289	22.8	−8.3
Independent	Julie Jennings	2,345	2.1	+2.1
Total formal votes		110,992	98.0	−0.4
Informal votes		2,253	2.0	+0.4
Turnout		113,245	94.7	−0.6
Two-party-preferred result
Liberal	Bruce Chamberlain	77,111	69.5	+24.2
Labor	Kevin Watt	33,870	30.5	+30.5
Liberal hold		Swing	N/A	

== See also ==
- 1988 Victorian state election
- Members of the Victorian Legislative Council, 1988–1992
