= Cameron Boardman =

Australian politician (born 1970)

Blair Cameron Boardman (born 10 December 1970) is the previous CEO of .au Domain Administration, is a former Australian politician. He was a Liberal member of the Victorian Legislative Council from 1996 to 2002, representing Chelsea Province.

Boardman was born in Melbourne to parents Peter and Valerie, and studied at Wesley College (1978–83), Haileybury College (1984–88), and the Victoria Police Academy (1989). He became a constable in the Victorian Police Force in 1989, serving until his move to politics in 1996. He undertook officer training in the Australian Army Reserve at Watsonia (1993–95) before completing his training at the Royal Military College, Duntroon in 1996.

Boardman joined the Liberal Party in 1994, and was President of the Mentone branch from 1995–96. In 1996 he was selected by the Liberal Party to contest Chelsea Province in the 30 March state elections of that year; he was successful. In 2002 he attempted to transfer to Western Port Province but was defeated. He has not returned to politics.

Boardman will commence as Chief Executive Officer of Berrigan Shire Council on 7 April 2026.

Parliament of Victoria
Preceded by Burwyn Davidson	Member for Chelsea Province; 1996–2002; With: Sue Wilding, Bob Smith	Succeeded by Matt Viney
