= Maureen Lyster =

Australian politician (born 1943)

Maureen Anne Lyster (born 10 September 1943) is an Australian politician. She was a Labor Party member of the Victorian Legislative Council from 1985 to 1992, representing Chelsea Province.

Lyster was educated at Brigidine College, the Gippsland Institute of Advanced Education, and the Melbourne College of Education. She was a primary and secondary teacher and librarian for most of her career prior to entering politics, though she worked as a teachers' union official from 1983 until her election to parliament in 1985. She held a number of roles in the Labor Party prior to her election, serving on the party's administrative committee from 1980 to 1982, its public office selection committee from 1974 to 1986, and as a member of its education policy committee from 1982 to 1984.

Lyster was elected to the Legislative Council at the 1985 state election, succeeding veteran Labor MP Eric Kent in his seat of Chelsea Province. She became parliamentary secretary to the Cabinet in 1988. In 1989, she was promoted to Minister for Local Government after the National Party blocked a Labor attempt to increase the number of ministers that could be constitutionally appointed from the Legislative Assembly, resulting in her appointment instead of right faction candidate and MLA Barry Rowe. In September that year, she was subject to a successful no-confidence motion in parliament, which would not happen to a state minister again until 2009. Lyster was promoted again to Minister for Health in 1991. She was defeated by Liberal Sue Wilding at the 1992 state election, one of many Labor MPs to lose their seats in the party's landslide defeat that year.

Lyster held a number of roles in the health sector after leaving politics, including as CEO of Riding for the Disabled (1993), CEO of the Alzheimers' Association of Victoria (1993–1996), CEO of Aged Care Australia (1996–2000), and a stint as a board member of Mercy Health and Aged Care thereafter.

Parliament of Victoria
Preceded by Eric Kent	Member for Chelsea Province; 1988–1996; With: Mal Sandon, Burwyn Davidson	Succeeded by Sue Wilding
