= Neil Stacey =

Australian politician (1934–1987)

Neil Frank Stacey (5 June 1934 – 29 January 1987) was an Australian politician.

He was born in Hastings to postmaster Frank Stacey and schoolteacher Charlotte Hodgins. He attended primary school at Bittern and then Frankston High School, qualifying as a teacher at Melbourne Teachers' College. From 1954 to 1974 he worked as a primary school teacher (including at Aspendale), and subsequently taught at Haileybury College. A non-commissioned officer in the Citizen Military Forces, he was a branch president of the Victorian Teachers Union and served on Chelsea City Council from 1967 to 1976 (mayor 1971–72).

After long involvement with the Liberal Party, he was elected to the Victorian Legislative Council in 1976 for Chelsea Province. He lost his seat in 1982. On 29 December 1956 he had married Barbara Southee, with whom he had three children.

Victorian Legislative Council
New seat	Member for Chelsea; 1976–1982; Served alongside: Eric Kent	Succeeded by Mal Sandon
