= 1990 Thomastown state by-election =

A by-election was held for the Victorian Legislative Assembly seat of Thomastown on 3 February 1990. The by-election was triggered by the death on 16 December 1989 of Beth Gleeson, the sitting Labor MP.

== Results ==
Thomastown by-election, 1990
| Party | Candidate | Votes | % | ±% |
|---|---|---|---|---|
| Labor | Peter Batchelor | 13,873 | 48.52 | −23.85 |
| Liberal | Michael Fusco | 6,574 | 22.99 | −4.64 |
| Democrats | Christine Craik | 5,572 | 19.49 | +19.49 |
| Independent | Monica Harte | 1,531 | 5.35 | +5.35 |
| Independent | Steve Pollock | 645 | 2.26 | +2.26 |
| Independent | John Murray | 243 | 0.85 | +0.85 |
| Independent | Earle Keegel | 157 | 0.55 | +0.55 |
| Total formal votes | | 28,595 | 87.26 | −4.65 |
| Informal votes | | 4,174 | 12.74 | +4.65 |
| Turnout | | 32,769 | 90.76 | −1.90 |
Two-party-preferred result
| Labor | Peter Batchelor | 15,335 | 53.68 | −18.69 |
| Democrats | Christine Craik | 13,234 | 46.32 | +46.32 |
| Labor hold | | Swing | −18.69 | |
