= Jenny Lindell =

Australian politician

Jennifer Margaret Lindell (born 19 December 1953 in Springvale, Melbourne, Victoria) is an Australian politician and former Speaker of the Victorian Legislative Assembly.

Lindell was educated at St Joseph's PS Springvale and Killester College, Springvale, and holds an Associate Diploma in Medical Radiations (RMIT). Before entering politics she worked for 20 years as a Medical Radiographer, and from 1990 to 1999 was an Electorate Officer at both state and national level.

Lindell was elected as a State MP for the Carrum in 1999 and represented the Labor Party. During her time as an MP she has served as a member and later chair of the Environment and Natural Resources Committee, and on the Legislative Assembly Privileges Committee. She was also acting Speaker for three years from 2003 before later being elected Speaker from 19 December 2006 until her defeat in 2010.

Victorian Legislative Assembly
Preceded by Judy Maddigan	Speaker; 2006–2010	Succeeded by Ken Smith
Preceded by David Lean	Member for Carrum; 1999–2010	Succeeded by Donna Bauer
