= Burwyn Davidson =

Australian politician (1943–2012)

Burwyn Eric Davidson (21 July 1943 – 9 June 2012) was an Australian politician. He was a Labor Party member of the Victorian Legislative Council from 1988 to 1996, representing Chelsea Province.

Davidson was born in Richmond, and attended Trinity Grammar School. He was a salesman and ministerial adviser before entering politics. He joined the Labor Party in 1973 and was heavily involved thereafter, serving as senior vice-president, as a member of the Administrative Committee and Public Office Selection Committee, and as the first full-time secretary of the party's right-wing Labor Unity faction from 1978 to 1988.

He was elected to the Legislative Council at the 1988 state election, succeeding Labor MP Mal Sandon, who shifted to the Legislative Assembly, in Sandon's seat of Chelsea Province. He was promoted to shadow minister for roads and ports in 1992 upon Labor's loss of government, but was dumped in a reshuffle in December 1993. He also served on the Natural Resources and Environment Committee (1988–1992), Road Safety Committee (1992–1996), and Legislative Council Government Appointments Committee (1991–1992).

He was defeated by Liberal candidate Cameron Boardman at the 1996 election. In retirement, he was an avid bluegrass musician.

Parliament of Victoria
Preceded by Mal Sandon	Member for Chelsea Province; 1988–1996; With: Maureen Lyster, Sue Wilding	Succeeded by Cameron Boardman
