= Natalie Suleyman =

Australian politician

The Honourable Natalie Suleyman MP
- Suleyman in 2026

Minister for Small and Family Business
- Incumbent
- Assumed office 15 April 2026
- Premier: Jacinta Allan; Ben Carroll
- Preceded by: Herself (as Minister for Small Business and Employment)

Minister for Trade, Tourism and Investment
- Incumbent
- Assumed office 4 August 2026
- Premier: Ben Carroll
- Preceded by: Herself (as Minister for Tourism)

Minister for Veterans
- Incumbent
- Assumed office 5 December 2022
- Premier: Daniel Andrews; Jacinta Allan; Ben Carroll
- Preceded by: Shaun Leane
Other ministerial offices
Minister for Tourism
In office 15 April 2026 – 4 August 2026
Premier	Jacinta Allan
Preceded by	Steve Dimopoulos (as Minister for Tourism, Sport and Major Events)
Succeeded by	Herself (as Minister for Trade, Tourism and Investment)
Minister for Employment
In office 15 April 2026 – 4 August 2026
Premier	Jacinta Allan
Preceded by	Herself (as Minister for Small Business and Employment)
Succeeded by	Position abolished
Minister for Youth
In office 5 December 2022 – 15 April 2026
Premier	Daniel Andrews; Jacinta Allan
Preceded by	Ros Spence
Succeeded by	Luba Grigorovitch
Minister for Small Business and Employment
In office 19 December 2024 – 15 April 2026
Premier	Jacinta Allan
Preceded by	Herself (as Minister for Small Business); Vicki Ward (as Minister for Employment)
Succeeded by	Herself (as Minister for Small and Family Business); Herself (as Minister for Employment)
Minister for Small Business
In office 5 December 2022 – 19 December 2024
Premier	Daniel Andrews; Jacinta Allan
Preceded by	Jaala Pulford
Succeeded by	Herself (as Minister for Small Business and Employment)

Member of the Victorian Legislative Assembly for St Albans
- Incumbent
- Assumed office 29 November 2014
- Preceded by: Seat re-established

Mayor of the City of Brimbank
- In office 2004–2006
- In office 2001–2002

Councillor of the City of Brimbank
- In office 2000–2008

Personal details
- Born: Nazlı Süleyman; 6 June 1974 (age 52)
- Party: Labor
- Website: www.nataliesuleyman.com.au

Natalie Suleyman (born Nazlı Süleyman on 6 June 1974) is an Australian politician. Suleyman is an elected member of the Victorian Legislative Assembly, having served as the Member for St Albans since 2014.

She holds three Ministerial portfolios in the Victorian Government; Veterans, Youth, and Small Business.

She is the first person of Turkish origin, as well as the first Muslim woman, to be elected to the Victorian Parliament.

== Political career ==
=== Local Politics ===
Natalie was first elected to political office as a councillor at the City of Brimbank in 2000. She was re-elected in 2003 and 2005, and was mayor on three occasions.

=== State Politics ===
In 2008, Natalie unsuccessfully contested Labor preselection for the seat of Kororoit.

In 2014 Natalie was preselected by the Labor Party to contest the seat of St Albans. St Albans was at the time a new safe seat for the Labor Party in Melbourne's western suburbs, having arisen through an electoral redistribution. Natalie was elected with 56.4% of the primary vote, and a two party preferred result of 67.5% the Liberal Party's candidate Moira Deeming.

In 2018 Natalie was reelected to St Albans, with a 59.7% of the primary vote, and a two party preferred result of 71.5% against the Liberal Party.

Following the 2022 Victorian State Election, Natalie was given a ministerial portfolio in the Andrews Government.

=== Federal politics ===
In 2018, a plan emerged to preselect Natalie for the newly created safe federal seat of Fraser. This plan faced internal backlash within the Labor Party, with Crikey reporting that the suggestion had "sent the party into conniptions" because of Suleyman's association with the "chaotic" Brimbank City Council. Reportedly, "many in the party were aghast at the idea of parachuting Ms Suleyman (into the seat)".

In response, a plan to preselect Daniel Mulino for the seat was put forward. Mulino eventually gained preselection of the seat after support from his associated union within the party. The party's maneuvering to achieve this outcome caused a reshuffle in the Labor Party at both state and federal levels.

== Misconduct findings ==
In June 2008, Suleyman contested ALP preselection for the state seat of Kororoit. The Victorian Ombudsman found that in order to ensure her preselection, she organised a deal with former Keilor state Member George Seitz whereby she would arrange for the funding of certain soccer-ground works, in return for his support at preselection. This gambit failed when Seitz unexpectedly withdrew his support, and the preselection was instead won by Marlene Kairouz. The Ombudsman found that Suleyman then attempted to cancel funding for the project associated with Seitz, a move that would have cost the council more than $300,000.

These events led to Seitz invoking Parliamentary privilege to criticise Suleyman on the floor of the Victorian Parliament. Seitz's comments, widely reported, included an accusation that Suleyman was the "Robert Mugabe of Brimbank", and had improperly interfered with local sporting clubs associated with Seitz; in response to her lost preselection.

Resultant reporting prompted an investigation by the Victorian Ombudsman into alleged misconduct at Brimbank Council. Regarding the allegations made by Seitz in parliament, the Ombudsman found that Natalie had indeed directed the council CEO to withdraw funding from development works at the Keilor Lodge Reserve, which 'had the CEO complied with the direction, (would have put the council) in breach of contract and at significant financial risk'. Natalie's explanation to the ombudsman that she was not involved in the issuing of the direction was found by the ombudsman to have been 'an attempt to mislead', with a finding made that 'the direction was issued in retaliation for Suleyman's pre-selection loss'. This led to a further finding that Suleyman had breached s76B(3) of the Local Government Act, having made improper use of her position. The ombudsman recommended that the breach be investigated by the Victorian department responsible for local government.

The other significant finding within the report, was that Suleyman had made an improper and informal demand that $680,000 be allocated to a project at Cairnlea Park, at a facility in which clubs to which Suleyman's family were linked. The ombudsman found that after the budget had been finalised at a council workshop, Suleyman had approached council staff and threatened to prevent the budget from being adopted unless her projects were funded. The council executive were found to have altered in scope several council items to ensure the demand could be accommodated. The ombudsman found that:

"The alleged actions of Cr Suleyman appeared to breach the councillor oath of office, which requires that councillors act in the best interests of the community. It is also clearly a misuse of Cr Suleyman's position as a councillor. In addition, I was concerned that the Brimbank officers acceded to Cr Suleyman's ‘demand’ without referring the matter to the whole council."

Other findings regarding Suleyman's conduct included:

- A misuse of council processes to further harass Seitz.
- Findings of abuse and aggression toward Council officers.
- An improper insistence that council spend $572 on library membership cards bearing her signature.
- Inappropriate disposal of confidential council documents.
- Enabling the rent-free access of her father to a council building with an ordinary annual lease value of over $15,000 (since 1999); and improperly accessing council files relating to that building. In 2006, following public scrutiny of this arrangement in a local newspaper, the property's $1,700 per year peppercorn lease (drawn up by the council in 2002) was then complied with. The ombudsman also found that Natalie had been involved in procuring $11,000 worth of building works for the benefit of her father at the property, writing 'It is apparent that Mr Suleyman received favourable treatment due to his daughter's influence'. Natalie denied these findings.
- An Engagement of 'subterfuge' against the Ombudsman, by having manipulated another councillor to sign a complaint letter to the Ombudsman in their name, when the letter had in fact been written by Natalie and another councillor.

The Local Government Inspectorate took no action against Natalie in the wake of the report. In a letter seen by the local newspaper Brimbank Weekly the inspectorate claimed to have found 'insufficient evidence to support a prosecution'.

The Ombudsman's report led to the passage of new laws banning councillors from working as staffers to members of Parliament. It also played a role in the eventual sacking of Brimbank Council in 2009.

== Awards and honours ==
Natalie has received the Order of Merit of the Republic of Poland, and an award from the Australian Society of Polish Jews and their descendants named after Henryk Sławik.

== Personal life ==
Her father, Hakki Suleyman, is the Chair of the Migrant Resource Centre North West and the convenor of the Turkish Cypriot program on 3ZZZ community radio.

Victorian Legislative Assembly
New seat	Member for St Albans; 2014–present	Incumbent
