= Mal Sandon =

Australian politician

Malcolm John (Mal) Sandon (born 16 September 1945) is an Australian politician. He was a Labor Party member of the Victorian Legislative Council from 1982 to 1988, representing Chelsea Province, and of the Victorian Legislative Assembly from 1988 to 1996, representing the electorate of Carrum. He served as Minister for Corrections and Minister for Police and Emergency Services in the Kirner government from 1990 to 1992.

Sandon was born in Chelsea and educated at Chelsea State School and Mordialloc Chelsea High School. He worked in clerical and laboring jobs from 1963 to 1969 before studying a Bachelor of Arts at Simon Fraser University in Canada, graduating in 1972 and winning the Robert Standfield Prize in political science. He was a postgraduate student and part-time tutor in the sociology department at La Trobe University from 1973 to 1976, a lecturer in the department of liberal studies at Swinburne Institute of Technology from 1974 to 1975, and a federal industrial officer with the Municipal Officers Association from 1976 until his election to parliament in 1982. He joined the Labor Party in 1972, and served as president of its Aspendale branch, and was the Labor campaign director for Isaacs at the 1980 federal election.

Sandon was elected to the Legislative Council at the 1982 state election. He served on the Public Bodies Review Committee (1982–1988), House Committee (1983–1985), Public Bodies Review Committee (1982–1988), and Legislative Council Estimates Committee (1986–1988). He resigned from the Legislative Council in 1988 to contest the Legislative Assembly seat of Carrum at the 1988 state election, and won the seat. He served as Parliamentary Secretary of the Cabinet under John Cain from 1989 to 1990, and Minister for Corrections and Minister for Police and Emergency Services from 1990 to 1992 under Joan Kirner. In the Legislative Assembly, he also served on the Social Development Committee (1988–1989) and the Crime Prevention Committee (1992–1994).

Sandon was narrowly re-elected when the Kirner government lost the 1992 election, but lost his spot in the shadow ministry after not attending a meeting of his Labor Unity faction. He was promoted back into the shadow ministry as Shadow Minister for Education shortly after. Sandon was defeated by Liberal candidate David Lean at the 1996 election, one of the few Labor casualties in an election in which Labor won several seats from the Kennett Liberal government. He said after his loss that he could not explain the result except that "voters had not reacted to such issues as privatisation and the casino".

Sandon later served a brief stint as an adviser to Bracks government transport minister Peter Batchelor, preparing a report on road safety and accident blackspots.

Victorian Legislative Council
Preceded by Neil Stacey	Member for Chelsea Province; 1982–1988; With: Eric Kent, Maureen Lyster	Succeeded by Burwyn Davidson
Victorian Legislative Assembly
Preceded by Ian Cathie	Member for Carrum; 1988–1996	Succeeded by David Lean
