= David Lean (politician) =

Australian politician

David Richard Lean (born 16 March 1945) is an Australian politician. He was a Liberal Party member of the Victorian Legislative Assembly from 1996 to 1999, representing the electorate of Carrum.

Lean was born in Melbourne, and educated at Melbourne Grammar School. He was the managing director of Stadiums Limited, his family's business, prior to entering politics. He was a councillor of the City of Chelsea from 1990 to 1994, and served as mayor in 1994.

Lean was elected to the Legislative Assembly at the 1996 state election, defeating Labor MP and former Kirner government minister Mal Sandon. Lean's victory in the formerly safe Labor seat fell against the tide of the 1996 election, the only seat gained by the Liberal government at an election at which they had a net loss of three seats to the Labor opposition. Lean was defeated by Labor candidate Jenny Lindell amidst the Liberal loss at the 1999 election.

Victorian Legislative Assembly
Preceded by Mal Sandon	Member for Carrum; 1996–1999	Succeeded by Jenny Lindell
