= 1988 Victorian state election =

Australian state election

- 1 October 1988

All 88 seats in the Victorian Legislative Assembly and 22 (of the 44) seats in the Victorian Legislative Council 45 seats needed for a majority
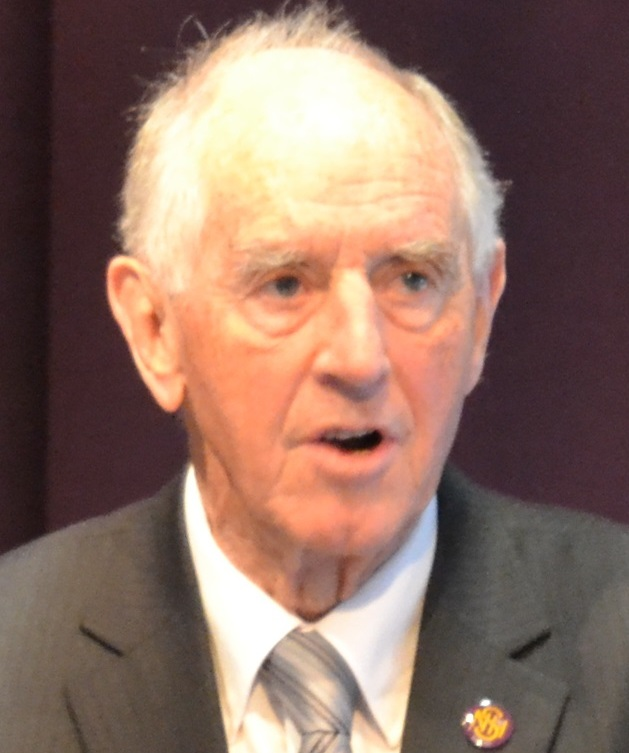

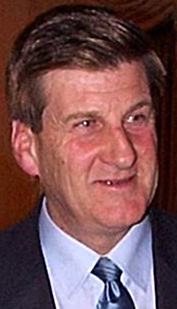

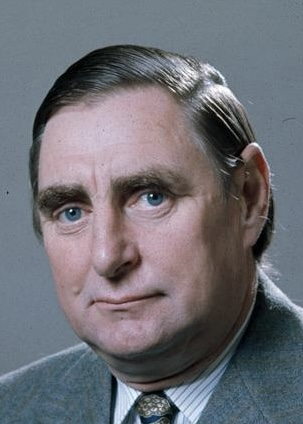
	First party	Second party	Third party
Leader	John Cain Jr.	Jeff Kennett	Peter Ross-Edwards
Party	Labor	Liberal	National
Leader since	9 September 1981	26 October 1982	17 June 1970
Leader's seat	Bundoora	Burwood	Shepparton
Last election	47	31	10
Seats won	46	33	9
Seat change	▼1	▲2	▼1
Popular vote	1,131,750	986,311	188,776
Percentage	46.55%	40.51%	7.76%
Swing	▼3.46	▼1.30	▲0.47
TPP	49.49%	50.51%
TPP swing	▼1.21	▲1.21
- Results in each electorate
Premier before election
John Cain Jr.
Labor
Elected Premier
John Cain Jr.
Labor

The 1988 Victorian state election, held on Saturday, 1 October 1988, was for the 51st Parliament of Victoria. It was held in the Australian state of Victoria to elect all 88 members of the state's Legislative Assembly and 22 members of the 44-member Legislative Council.

The incumbent Labor Party government led by Premier John Cain Jr. won a third term in office, despite a swing against it, and only lost the seat of Warrandyte in Melbourne's north-east. This was credited by commentators to a strong campaign targeting Liberal leader and future Premier Jeff Kennett whose aggressive leadership style was still seen as a liability, as well as continuing instability in the federal Coalition. Labor's narrow wins in middle class marginal seats saw it retain its majority despite the Liberals winning a bare majority of the two party preferred vote.

Future Premier Denis Napthine entered parliament at this election.

== Results ==
=== Legislative Assembly ===
Party	Votes	%	+/–	Seats	+/–
Labor	1,131,750	46.55	▼3.46	46	▼1
Liberal	986,311	40.56	▼1.30	33	▲2
National	188,776	7.76	▲0.47	9	▼1
Democrats	25,611	1.05	New	0	Steady
Call to Australia	25,543	1.05	New	0	Steady
Democratic Labour	6,018	0.25	New	0	Steady
Independents	67,493	2.78	▲1.94	0	Steady
Total	2,431,502	100.00	–	88	–
Valid votes	2,431,502	96.11			
Invalid/blank votes	98,525	3.89	▲1.21		
Total votes	2,530,027	100.00	–		
Registered voters/turnout	2,739,614	92.35	▼0.86		
Two-party-preferred
Labor	1,202,294	49.49	▼1.21		
Liberal	1,227,295	50.51	▲1.21		
Total	2,429,589	100.00	–		

=== Legislative Council ===
Victorian state election, 1 October 1988 Legislative Council
Enrolled voters	2,739,614				
Votes cast	2,529,569		Turnout	92.33	–0.86
Informal votes	109,578		Informal	4.33	+1.32
Summary of votes by party
Party	Primary votes	%	Swing	Seats won	Seats held
Labor	1,164,796	48.13	+0.85	9	19
Liberal	1,052,591	43.50	+2.35	10	19
National	181,074	7.48	+0.81	3	6
Call to Australia	5,363	0.22	–0.49	0	0
Independent	16,167	0.67	+0.45	0	0
Total	2,419,991			22	44

== Seats changing hands ==
Seat	Pre-1988			Swing	Post-1988		
Seat	Party	Member	Margin	Swing	Margin	Member	Party
Mildura	National	Milton Whiting	23.0	-24.0	1.0	Craig Bildstien	Liberal
Warrandyte	Labor	Lou Hill	0.2	-1.7	1.5	Phil Honeywood	Liberal

- Members listed in italics did not recontest their seats.

== Key dates ==
Date	Event
29 August 1988	The Legislative Council was prorogued and the Legislative Assembly was dissolved.
29 August 1988	Writs were issued by the Governor to proceed with an election.
2 September 1988	The Constitution Act Amendment (Electoral Procedures) Act 1988 (No.31) comes into operation.
5 September 1988	The electoral rolls were closed.
9 September 1988	Nominations for candidates for the election closed at noon.
1 October 1988	Polling day, between the hours of 8am and 6pm.
13 October 1988	The Cain Ministry was reconstituted, with two new ministers sworn in.
21 October 1988	The writ was returned and the results formally declared.
25 October 1988	Parliament resumed for business.

== Post-election pendulum ==
Labor seats (46)
Marginal
Ballarat South	Frank Sheehan	ALP	0.2%
Bellarine	Graham Ernst	ALP	0.7%
Bendigo West	David Kennedy	ALP	0.9%
Bentleigh	Ann Barker	ALP	1.4%
Ringwood	Kay Setches	ALP	1.7%
Box Hill	Margaret Ray	ALP	2.1%
Mentone	Peter Spyker	ALP	2.4%
Geelong	Hayden Shell	ALP	2.5%
Morwell	Keith Hamilton	ALP	2.8%
Wantirna	Carolyn Hirsh	ALP	2.9%
Mitcham	John Harrowfield	ALP	3.0%
Monbulk	Neil Pope	ALP	3.5%
Pascoe Vale	Kelvin Thomson	ALP	4.4%
Whittlesea	Max McDonald	ALP	4.7%
St Kilda	Andrew McCutcheon	ALP	5.6%
Fairly safe
Knox	Steve Crabb	ALP	6.0%
Greensborough	Pauline Toner	ALP	6.1%
Springvale	Eddie Micallef	ALP	6.4%
Essendon	Barry Rowe	ALP	6.7%
Oakleigh	Race Mathews	ALP	7.3%
Carrum	Mal Sandon	ALP	7.5%
Dandenong North	Jan Wilson	ALP	8.1%
Niddrie	Bob Sercombe	ALP	8.1%
Doveton	Rob Jolly	ALP	8.3%
Frankston North	Jane Hill	ALP	8.8%
Albert Park	Bunna Walsh	ALP	8.9%
Clayton	Gerard Vaughan	ALP	8.9%
Broadmeadows	Jim Kennan	ALP	9.9%
Safe
Bundoora	John Cain	ALP	10.2%
Werribee	Ken Coghill	ALP	10.5%
Keilor	George Seitz	ALP	11.4%
Dandenong	Terry Norris	ALP	12.6%
St Albans	Alex Andrianopoulos	ALP	12.7%
Derrimut	David Cunningham	ALP	13.3%
Geelong North	Neil Trezise	ALP	14.0%
Coburg	Peter Gavin	ALP	15.3%
Reservoir	Jim Simmonds	ALP	16.4%
Brunswick	Tom Roper	ALP	16.7%
Richmond	Demetri Dollis	ALP	17.3%
Williamstown	Joan Kirner	ALP	17.7%
Melbourne	Neil Cole	ALP	18.0%
Preston	Michael Leighton	ALP	21.1%
Sunshine	Ian Baker	ALP	21.5%
Northcote	Tony Sheehan	ALP	21.7%
Thomastown	Beth Gleeson	ALP	22.4%
Footscray	Robert Fordham	ALP	23.7%

Liberal/National seats (42)
Marginal
Syndal	Geoff Coleman	LIB	0.7%
Mildura	Craig Bildstien	LIB	1.0% v NAT
Berwick	Rob Maclellan	LIB	1.4%
Warrandyte	Phil Honeywood	LIB	1.5%
Narracan	John Delzoppo	LIB	1.7%
Dromana	Ron Wells	LIB	1.8%
Mornington	Robin Cooper	LIB	2.0%
Bennettswood	Roger Pescott	LIB	2.2%
Ivanhoe	Vin Heffernan	LIB	2.4%
Forest Hill	John Richardson	LIB	2.9%
Ballarat North	Steve Elder	LIB	3.5%
Evelyn	Jim Plowman	LIB	4.0%
South Barwon	Harley Dickinson	LIB	4.8%
Frankston South	Graeme Weideman	LIB	4.9%
Caulfield	Ted Tanner	LIB	5.1%
Burwood	Jeff Kennett	LIB	5.6%
Bendigo East	Michael John	LIB	5.7%
Fairly safe
Gisborne	Tom Reynolds	LIB	6.4%
Sandringham	David Lea	LIB	6.4%
Ripon	Tom Austin	LIB	6.9%
Doncaster	Victor Perton	LIB	7.4%
Prahran	Don Hayward	LIB	7.4%
Hawthorn	Phil Gude	LIB	8.0%
Glen Waverley	Ross Smith	LIB	8.5%
Bulleen	David Perrin	LIB	9.2%
Safe
Kew	Jan Wade	LIB	11.0%
Portland	Denis Napthine	LIB	11.2%
Malvern	Geoff Leigh	LIB	11.9%
Gippsland West	Alan Brown	LIB	12.6%
Brighton	Alan Stockdale	LIB	13.0%
Balwyn	Robert Clark	LIB	14.3%
Polwarth	Ian Smith	LIB	16.1%
Benalla	Pat McNamara	NAT	17.9%
Gippsland East	Bruce Evans	NAT	19.4%
Gippsland South	Tom Wallace	NAT	20.2%
Murray Valley	Ken Jasper	NAT	21.4%
Shepparton	Peter Ross-Edwards	NAT	21.5%
Benambra	Lou Lieberman	LIB	21.6%
Warrnambool	John McGrath	NAT	27.3%
Swan Hill	Barry Steggall	NAT	28.0%
Rodney	Eddie Hann	NAT	28.6%
Lowan	Bill McGrath	NAT	32.0%

== Aftermath ==
On 23 May 1989, Jeff Kennett was voted out of the Liberal leadership in favour of Alan Brown; Brown led the party until 23 April 1991 when he was also forced out after a successful comeback by Kennett. During Brown's period as Opposition Leader, the Liberals negotiated the first coalition agreement with the Nationals in over forty years, in part due to a belief by some (in spite of what political scientist Brian Costar called a "lack of psephological evidence to support this assertion") that had the parties been in coalition at the election, they would have won.

== See also ==
- Candidates of the 1988 Victorian state election
