= Peter Batchelor =

Australian politician

The Honourable Peter Batchelor
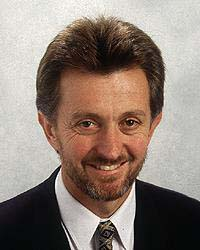

Minister for the Arts
- In office 20 January 2010 – 2 December 2010
- Leader: John Brumby
- Preceded by: Lynne Kosky
- Succeeded by: Ted Baillieu

Minister for Community Development
- In office 3 August 2007 – 19 January 2010
- Leader: John Brumby
- Preceded by: Christine Campbell
- Succeeded by: Lily D'Ambrosio

Minister for Energy and Resources
- In office 1 December 2006 – 2 December 2010
- Leader: Steve Bracks; John Brumby
- Preceded by: Candy Broad
- Succeeded by: Michael O'Brien

Minister for Victorian Communities
- In office 1 December 2006 – 3 August 2007
- Leader: Steve Bracks
- Preceded by: New position
- Succeeded by: Position abolished

Minister for Major Projects
- In office 12 February 2002 – 1 December 2006
- Leader: Steve Bracks
- Preceded by: John Pandazopoulos
- Succeeded by: Theo Theophanous

Minister of Transport
- In office 20 October 1999 – 1 December 2006
- Leader: Steve Bracks
- Preceded by: Robin Cooper
- Succeeded by: Lynne Kosky

Member of the Victorian Legislative Assembly for Thomastown
- In office 3 February 1990 – 2 November 2010
- Preceded by: Beth Gleeson
- Succeeded by: Bronwyn Halfpenny

Personal details
- Born: 21 September 1950 (age 76) Western Sydney, New South Wales, Australia
- Party: Labor

Peter John Batchelor (born 21 September 1950) is an Australian former politician who served as an Australian Labor Party (ALP) member of the Victorian Legislative Assembly seat of Thomastown from 1990 until 2010.

Batchelor was born in western Sydney. He attended Beaumaris High School. His grandmother reportedly once held a 50-year-plus record as the longest card-carrying member of the ALP.

== Career ==
Prior to entering politics, Batchelor was a union official at Furnishing Trades Union from 1972 to 1982. From 1983 to 1990, he was the ALP Victorian state branch secretary.

=== Member of Parliament ===
Batchelor was elected in a 1990 by-election in the district of Thomastown, following the death of Beth Gleeson.

His parliamentary roles are listed as follows.

- Shadow Minister for Public Transport 1992-96.
- Manager of Opposition Business 1995-99.
- Shadow Minister of Transport (Victoria) 1996-99.
- Manager, Government Business in the Legislative Assembly October 1999-November 2010.
- Minister of Transport October 1999-December 2006.
- Minister for Major Projects 2002-05.
- Minister for Energy and Resources December 2006-December 2010.
- Manager of Government Business Legislative Assembly December 2006-November 2010.
- Minister for Victorian Communities December 2006-August 2007.
- Minister for Community Development August 2007-January 2010.
- Minister for the Arts January 2010-December 2010.

As Transport Minister, Batchelor oversaw the $750 million Regional Fast Rail project. In 2000, the State Government approved funding for a major upgrade to rail lines between Melbourne and Ballarat, Bendigo, Geelong and Traralgon, to provide fast rail passenger services

As Minister for Energy and Resources, Batchelor initiated the roll-out of smart meters to 2.5 million homes and businesses. The roll-out of smart meters was reportedly to assist with consumer choice on electricity providers and to help manage climate change. However, the roll-out was stopped when the budget blew-out from $800 million to $2 billion. The roll-out was completed under the Andrews Government in 2015.

According to Melbourne public transport academic Paul Mees, Batchelor "was staunchly against privatisation when in opposition and then continued with privatisation and reprivatisation in government.

On 7 October 2010, Batchelor announced he would not re-contest his seat at the 2010 state election. Dorothy, his partner, was also reported to be retiring from work.

=== Later role ===
In February, 2012, Batchelor was appointed President of the Community Broadcasting Foundation. The Foundation, based in Melbourne, is the independent funding body annually distributing over $15m of federal grants to 220 Australian community based media organisations.

== Campaign disputes ==
Reportedly, Batchelor "helped organise and distribute bogus how-to-vote cards for the Nuclear Disarmament Party" (sic) during the 1985 Nunawading by-election, which appeared to indicate the recommended voting preferences of the Nuclear Disarmament Party. Campaigning for nuclear disarmament was popular in left-wing politics during the 1980s. Police investigated the matter and Batchelor was not charged with any criminal offence.

In 2016, Batchelor was filmed removing a Greens election banner and replacing it with ALP election material in the seat of Batman.

Victorian Legislative Assembly
Preceded by Beth Gleeson	Member for Thomastown; 1990–2010	Succeeded by Bronwyn Halfpenny
