= Chelsea Province =

Former electoral province in Australia

Chelsea Province Victoria—Legislative Council
- State: Victoria
- Created: 1976
- Abolished: 2006
- Namesake: Suburb of Chelsea
- Demographic: Metropolitan

Chelsea Province was an electorate of the Victorian Legislative Council. It existed as a two-member electorate from 1976 to 2006, with members holding alternating eight-year terms. It was a marginal seat throughout its existence, and was won by the party that won government at each election from 1982 to 2006. It was abolished from the 2006 state election in the wake of the Bracks Labor government's reform of the Legislative Council.

It was located in the south-east of Melbourne. In 2002, when it was last contested, it covered an area of 266 km^{2} and included the suburbs of Carrum, Carrum Downs, Chelsea, Cranbourne, Frankston, Hampton Park, Keysborough, Seaford and Springvale.

== Members for Chelsea Province ==
Member 1	Party	Year		
Neil Stacey	Liberal	1976	Member 2	Party
Neil Stacey	Liberal	1979	Eric Kent	Labor
Mal Sandon	Labor	1982	Eric Kent	Labor
Mal Sandon	Labor	1985	Maureen Lyster	Labor
Burwyn Davidson	Labor	1988	Maureen Lyster	Labor
Burwyn Davidson	Labor	1992	Sue Wilding	Liberal
Cameron Boardman	Liberal	1996	Sue Wilding	Liberal
Cameron Boardman	Liberal	1999	Bob Smith	Labor
Matt Viney	Labor	2002	Bob Smith	Labor

== Election results ==
2002 Victorian state election: Chelsea Province
Party	Candidate	Votes	%	±%
Labor	Matt Viney	69,508	54.0	+5.5
Liberal	Vanthida Lao	42,715	33.2	−11.9
Greens	Hilary Bray	11,904	9.3	+8.7
Democrats	Wendy Thacker	4,525	3.5	−0.5
Total formal votes		128,652	96.1	−0.2
Informal votes		5,234	3.9	+0.2
Turnout		133,886	92.9	
Two-party-preferred result
Labor	Matt Viney	80,160	61.7	+8.9
Liberal	Vanthida Lao	49,825	38.3	−8.9
Labor hold		Swing	+8.9	
