= Bob Smith (Australian politician) =

Australian politician

Robert Frederick Smith (born 22 May 1948) is an Australian politician. He was a Labor Party member of the Victorian Legislative Council from 1999 to 2010.

Smith was born in England, and attended St Brendan's Public school 1958–63 and Salisbury High School in Brisbane, Queensland, 1963–65. In 1965 he became a permanent member of the Royal Australian Navy, where he remained until 1980, winning Australian Active Service Medal, Vietnam Logistic & Support Medal and Australian Service Medal. In 1980 Smith became the plant operator of a steel mill. In 1989, he became a union leader.

Smith was elected to the Legislative Council in the 1999 Victorian state election, representing Chelsea Province. When the Legislative Council was reformed in 2006, he won preselection for the third position on the Labor ticket for South-Eastern Metropolitan Region, and was elected. In December 2006 he became President of the Legislative Council. In the 2010 election, Smith ran for a seat in the Western Metropolitan Region but failed to win election.

Victorian Legislative Council
| Preceded by Monica Gould | President of the Victorian Legislative Council; 2006–2010 | Succeeded by Bruce Atkinson |
