= Eric Kent =

Australian politician (1919–2019)

The Honourable Eric Kent OAM
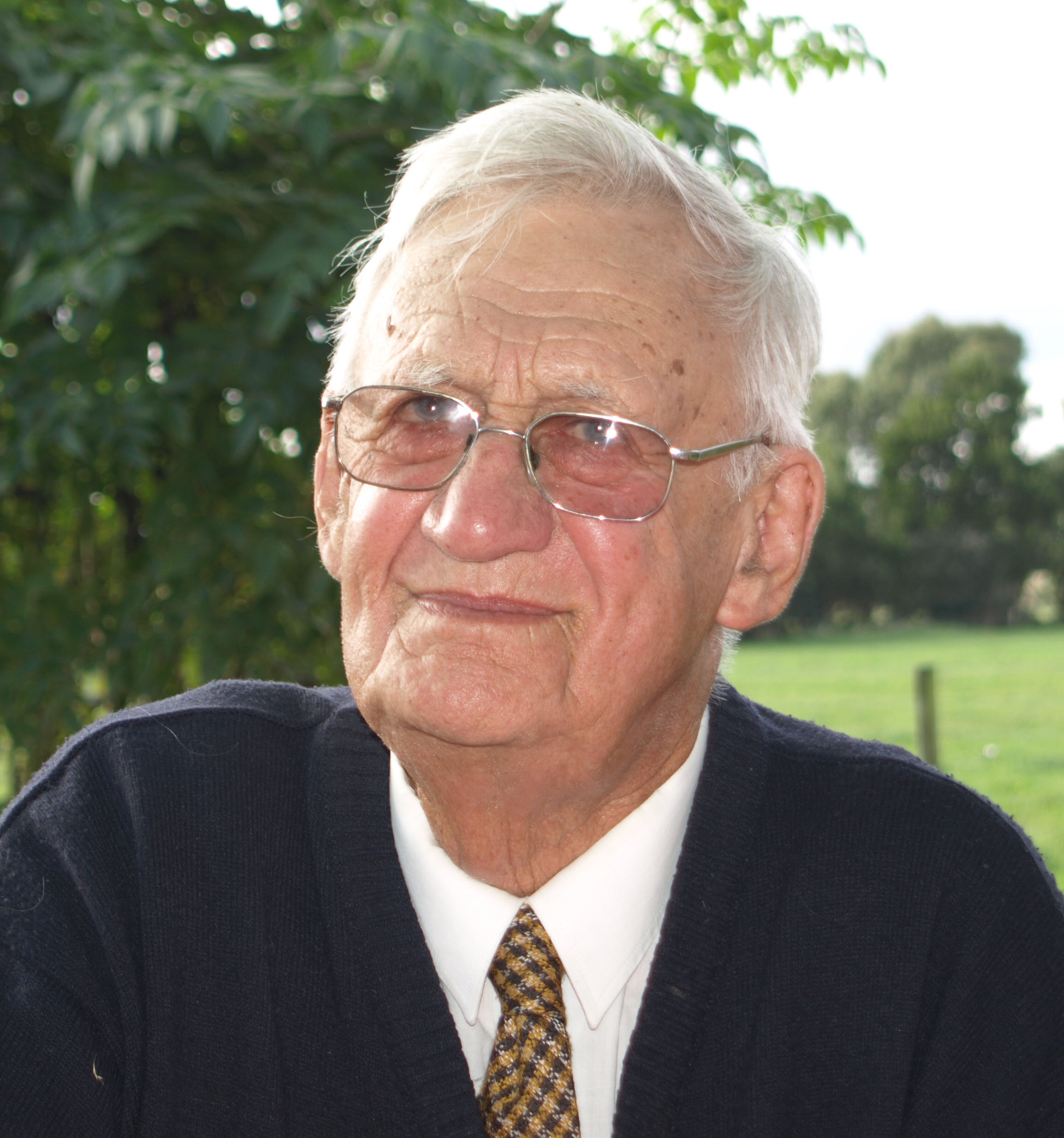
- The Hon Daniel Eric Kent OAM in April 2011

Minister for Agriculture
- In office 8 April 1982 – 14 March 1985
- Preceded by: Tom Austin
- Succeeded by: Evan Walker

Member of the Victorian Legislative Council
- In office 30 May 1970 – 19 March 1976
- Preceded by: Arthur Hewson
- Succeeded by: James Allister Taylor
- Constituency: Gippsland Province
- In office 5 May 1979 – 14 July 1985
- Succeeded by: Maureen Lyster
- Constituency: Chelsea Province

Personal details
- Born: Daniel Eric Kent; 30 June 1919 Areegra, Victoria, Australia
- Died: 26 April 2019 (aged 99)
- Party: Labor
- Spouse: Bette Wallis (m. 1949)
- Children: Three
- Occupation: Farmer and grazier

Daniel Eric Kent OAM (30 June 1919 – 26 April 2019) was an Australian politician, elected as a member of the Victorian Legislative Council in 1970.

== Early life ==
Kent was born at Areegra near Warracknabeal to Daniel Kent, a wheat and wool grower, and Sophie Elizabeth, née Menzel. He attended Areegra State School and farmed on the family property until 1949, after which he farmed at Yannathan, first dairy and then beef from 1973. On 18 April 1949 he married Bette Myra Wallis, a journalist, with whom he had three children.

== Career ==
Kent was active in various graziers' associations, including the Victorian Wheat and Woolgrowers Association, the Victorian Dairy Farmers' Association, the Australian Primary Producers' Union and the Victorian Farmers' and Graziers' Association.

He was a member of the Anglican Diocese of Gippsland Synod, serving on the Social Responsibilities Committee for 30 years. He was co-author of the history of St John's Anglican Church, Lang Lang, Victoria.

A life member of the Labor Party, he spent ten years as president of the McMillan federal electorate assembly, contesting the seat himself in 1963 and 1966. In 1970 he was elected to the Victorian Legislative Council for Gippsland Province. He was defeated in 1976, but returned to the Council in 1979 for Chelsea Province, serving as Minister of Agriculture from 1982 to 1985. He held the seat until 1985, when he retired.

== Honours ==
Kent was a recipient of the Queen's Silver Jubilee Medal in 1977, and in 2008 was awarded the Order of Australia for "service to the community of the Gippsland district through a range of church, historical and sporting groups, and to the Parliament of Victoria."

In 2015 the then Bishop of Gippsland, Kay Goldsworthy, presented him with a certificate marking over 44 years as a member of the Diocesan Synod.

Political offices
Preceded by Tom Austin	Minister for Agriculture; 1982–1985	Succeeded by Evan Walker
