= Sue Wilding =

Australian politician

Sue deCarteret Wilding (born 13 September 1948) was an Australian politician.

She was born in Guernsey, migrating with her family to Australia in 1957. She attended Dandenong North Primary School and Frankston High School and worked as a dental assistant in Frankston and Chelsea from 1965 to 1968. In 1968 she became survey drafting officer with the State Rivers and Water Supply Commission, moving to work for the Shire of Mornington in 1969. In 1981 she was elected to Hastings Shire Council, serving as president from 1984 to 1985 and from 1989 to 1990. She was a member of the Liberal Party, and was vice-president of the Balnarring/Merricks branch in 1990.

In 1992, Wilding was elected to the Victorian Legislative Council as a member for Chelsea Province. She held the seat until 1999, when she was defeated by Labor candidate Bob Smith. Since 2000 she has worked as an executive sales consultant with Bennetts Real Estate Mornington.
