= Donna Bauer =

Australian politician

Donna Bauer OAM
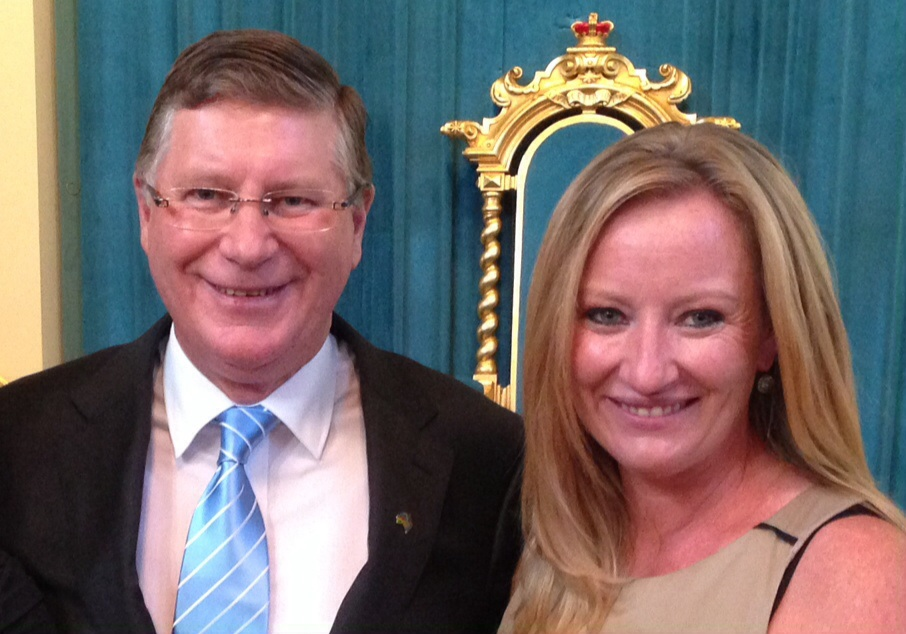
- Bauer with then-Victorian Premier Denis Napthine in 2014

Member of the Victorian Legislative Assembly for Carrum
- In office 27 November 2010 – 29 November 2014
- Preceded by: Jenny Lindell
- Succeeded by: Sonya Kilkenny

Personal details
- Born: 4 October 1970 (age 56) Melbourne
- Party: Liberal Party
- Children: 4
- Education: Royal Melbourne Institute of Technology
- Profession: Public relations
- Website: donnabauer.com.au

Donna Jane Hope née Bauer OAM (born 4 October 1970) is an Australian politician who represented the Liberal Party as the member for Carrum in the Victorian Legislative Assembly from 2010 to 2014, having previously served as the Deputy Mayor of the City of Kingston.

== Early career ==
Hope obtained a Bachelor of Arts in Public Relations from RMIT University and was previously employed as a Corporate Communications Consultant at the City of Greater Dandenong. She is a bowel cancer survivor and current ambassador for Bowel Cancer Australia, former ambassador for Bully Zero Australia Foundation, and former board member of Frankston Business Network.

== Politics ==
Hope entered Parliament after defeating Jenny Lindell in the 2010 state election.

Hope narrowly lost the electorate of Carrum in the 2014 Victorian state election to Labor's Sonya Kilkenny and unsuccessfully contested the same division in the 2018 Victorian state election.

Hope made several further attempts to re-enter parliament, losing Liberal Party preselection ballots to be the party’s candidate for the federal seat of Dunkley in 2016, 2022 2024, and 2025, as well as being unsuccessful in gaining nomination as a Liberal upper house candidate in the 2022 Victorian state election.

== Post-parliament ==
Since departing Parliament, Bauer has worked variously as an airline hostess and an electorate officer for Member for Mornington Chris Crewther.

== Honours and recognition ==
Bauer was awarded the Medal of the Order of Australia in the 2024 King's Birthday Honours for "service to the people and Parliament of Victoria, and to bowel cancer awareness".

Victorian Legislative Assembly
Preceded by Jenny Lindell	Member for Carrum; 2010–2014	Succeeded by Sonya Kilkenny
