= Electoral district of Mill Park =

State electoral district of Victoria, Australia

Mill Park Victoria—Legislative Assembly
- Interactive map of electoral district boundaries from the 2022 state election
- State: Victoria
- Created: 1992
- MP: Lily D'Ambrosio
- Party: Labor Party
- Electors: 46,475 (2018)
- Area: 42 km^{2} (16.2 sq mi)
- Demographic: Metropolitan

The electoral district of Mill Park is an electoral district of the Victorian Legislative Assembly.

== Members for Mill Park ==
| Member | Party | Term |
|---|---|---|
| Alex Andrianopoulos | Labor | 1992–2002 |
| Lily D'Ambrosio | Labor | 2002–2026 |

== Election results ==
2022 Victorian state election: Mill Park
| Party | Candidate | Votes | % | ±% |
|---|---|---|---|---|
| Labor | Lily D'Ambrosio | 18,857 | 49.9 | −12.8 |
| Liberal | Paige Yap | 9,797 | 25.9 | +4.6 |
| Greens | Chris Kearney | 2,761 | 7.3 | +2.0 |
| Freedom | Andrew Filippopoulos | 2,658 | 7.0 | +7.0 |
| Family First | Craig Anderson | 1,891 | 5.0 | +5.0 |
| Animal Justice | Marcia Simons | 1,833 | 4.9 | −1.9 |
| Total formal votes | | 37,793 | 93.8 | +0.6 |
| Informal votes | | 2,515 | 6.2 | −0.5 |
| Turnout | | 40,308 | 87.8 | −0.8 |
Two-party-preferred result
| Labor | Lily D'Ambrosio | 23,274 | 61.6 | –13.3 |
| Liberal | Paige Yap | 14,519 | 38.4 | +13.3 |
| Labor hold | | Swing | –13.3 | |
