= Bronwyn Halfpenny =

Australian politician

Bronwyn Halfpenny MP
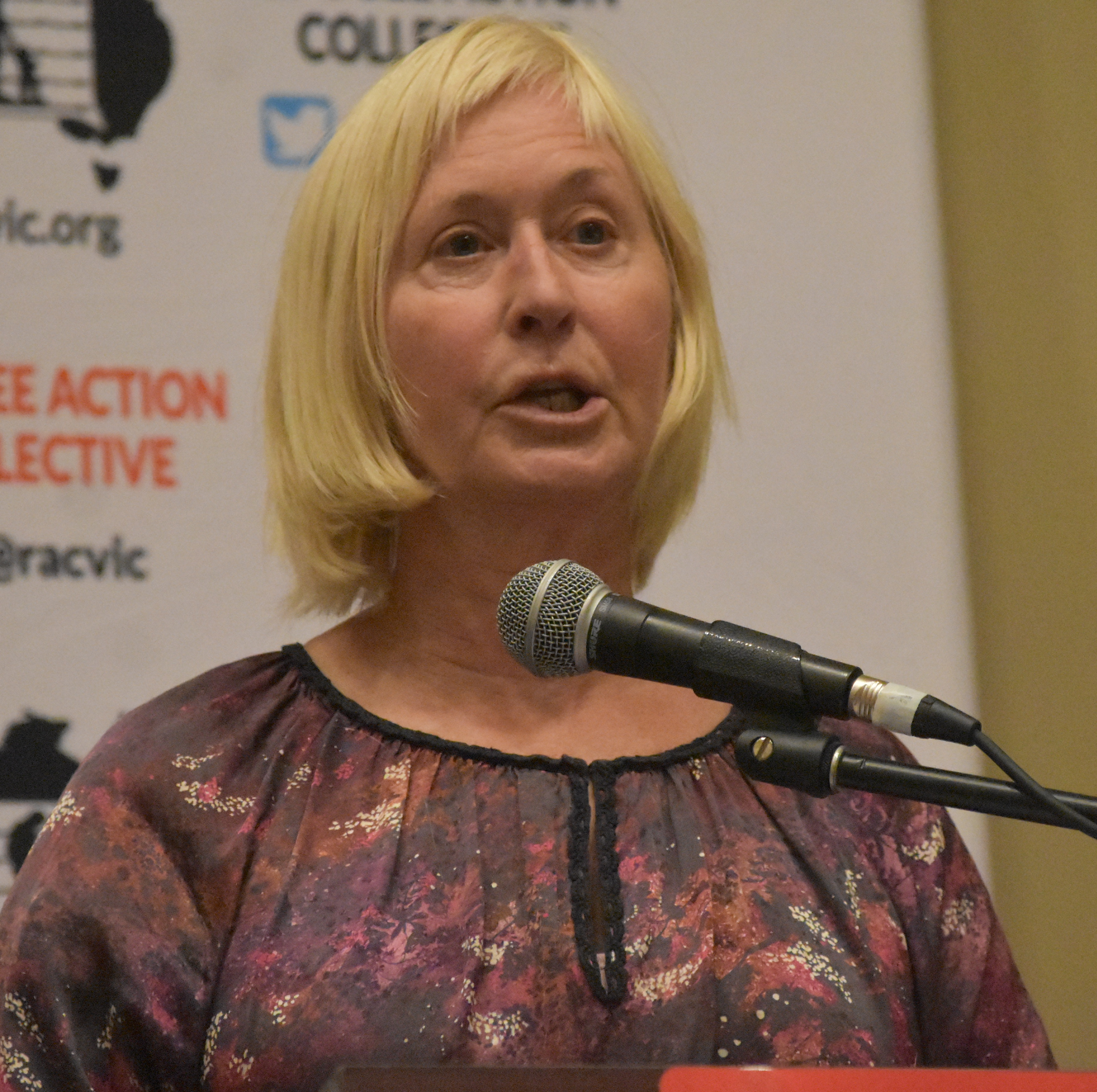
- Halfpenny in 2026

Member of the Victorian Legislative Assembly for Thomastown
- Incumbent
- Assumed office 27 November 2010
- Preceded by: Peter Batchelor

Personal details
- Born: 30 July 1963 (age 62) Richmond, Victoria
- Party: Labor Party
- Website: www.bronwynhalfpenny.org.au

Bronwyn Halfpenny (born 30 July 1963) is an Australian politician, and has been the member for Thomastown in the Victorian Legislative Assembly since 2010.

She is the daughter of the well-known trade union leader John Halfpenny and grew up in the Melbourne suburb of Watsonia. She was educated at Watsonia Primary School, Watsonia High School and La Trobe University, from which she graduated with a Bachelor of Economics.

Prior to her election to the Victorian state parliament, Halfpenny was the secretary of the Food and Confectionery Division of the Australian Manufacturing Workers Union from 1999 to 2006, and Industrial Campaigns Officer of the Victorian Trades Hall Council from 2006 to 2010.

She lives in the northern suburbs of Melbourne and has two children.

Victorian Legislative Assembly
Preceded by Peter Batchelor	Member for Thomastown; 2010–present	Incumbent
