= Lily D'Ambrosio =

Australian politician

The Honourable Lily D'Ambrosio MP
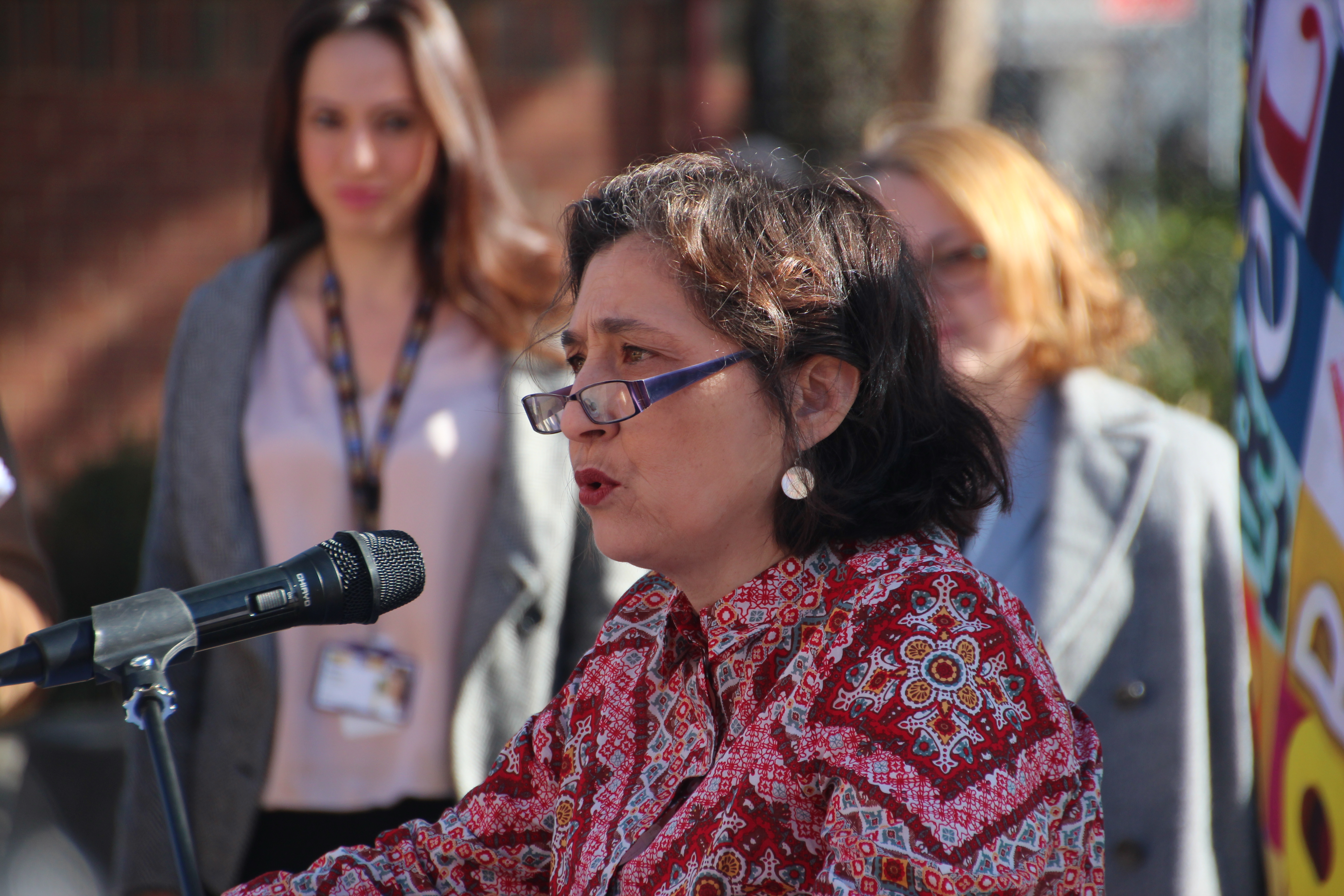
- D'Ambrosio giving a speech in August 2017

Minister for Energy and Resources Minister for Climate Action Minister for the State Electricity Commission
- In office 5 December 2022 – 30 July 2026
- Premier: Daniel Andrews; Jacinta Allan; Ben Carroll
- Preceded by: Herself (as Minister for Energy, Environment and Climate Change)
- Succeeded by: Jaclyn Symes

Minister for Energy, Environment and Climate Change
- In office 4 December 2014 – 5 December 2022
- Leader: Daniel Andrews
- Preceded by: Russell Northe
- Succeeded by: Herself (as Minister for Energy and Resources and Minister for Climate Action); Ingrid Stitt (as Minister for the Environment)

Minister for Solar Homes
- In office 29 November 2018 – 5 December 2022
- Leader: Daniel Andrews
- Preceded by: Office established
- Succeeded by: Office abolished

Minister for Suburban Development
- In office 23 May 2016 – 29 November 2018
- Leader: Daniel Andrews
- Preceded by: Office established
- Succeeded by: Marlene Kairouz

Minister for Industry
- In office 4 December 2014 – 23 May 2016
- Leader: Daniel Andrews
- Preceded by: Office established
- Succeeded by: Wade Noonan

Minister for Community Development
- In office 19 January 2010 – 2 December 2010
- Leader: John Brumby
- Preceded by: Peter Batchelor
- Succeeded by: Mary Wooldridge

Member of the Victorian Legislative Assembly for Mill Park
- Incumbent
- Assumed office 30 November 2002
- Preceded by: Alex Andrianopoulos

Personal details
- Born: 30 July 1964 (age 62) Melbourne, Victoria, Australia
- Party: Labor
- Children: 2
- Education: University of Melbourne
- Website: www.lilydambrosio.com.au

Liliana D'Ambrosio (Italian: [liˈljaːna damˈbrɔːzjo]; born 30 July 1964) is an Australian politician. She has been a Labor Party member of the Victorian Legislative Assembly since 2002, representing the electorate of Mill Park.

== Education ==
She was educated at Mercy College, Coburg and St Aloysius' College, North Melbourne. She received an Arts degree from the University of Melbourne in 1986 and later a Diploma in Public Policy.

== Political career ==
D'Ambrosio joined the Labor Party at university, and subsequently became an organiser with the Australian Services Union in 1986. She was promoted to state organiser in 1994, and served in the position until 1999, when she became an electorate officer to Alex Andrianopoulos, the then-Speaker of the Victorian Legislative Assembly. He retired in 2002, and she replaced him as the party's candidate in his safe seat of Mill Park.

In 2010, D'Ambrosio joined John Brumby's cabinet when she was appointed Minister for Community Development after a cabinet reshuffle following the resignation of Lynne Kosky.

She served as Minister for Climate Action, Minister for Energy & Resources and Minister for the State Electricity Commission under the Allan government, having previously served in similar roles under the Andrews government from 2014 until 2022.

On 30 July 2026 D'Ambrosio announced that she is retiring from politics and will not be contesting the Mill Park seat in the upcoming November election.

D'Ambrosio is a member of the Socialist Left Labor faction.

=== Electoral history ===
Electoral history of Lily D'Ambrosio in the Parliament of Victoria
Year	Electorate	Party	First Preference Result				Two Candidate Result			
Year	Electorate	Party	Votes	%	+%	Position	Votes	%	+%	Result
2002	Mill Park	Labor	22,746	70.1	+7.5	1st	24,915	76.8	+13.0	Elected
2006	Mill Park	Labor	21,288	62.0	−8.1	1st	24,276	70.8	−6.0	Elected
2010	Mill Park	Labor	21,861	60.89	−1.16	1st	24,966	69.45	−1.34	Elected
2014	Mill Park	Labor	22,807	59.8	+1.7	1st	26,314	69.9	+2.9	Elected
2018	Mill Park	Labor	24,729	62.71	+2.92	1st	29,588	74.90	+5.04	Elected
2022	Mill Park	Labor	18,857	49.9	−12.8	1st	23,259	61.4	–13.5	Elected

== Personal life ==
D'Ambrosio is a member of Labor women's network Emily's List and the Union of Australian Women. She is married, with two daughters.

D'Ambrosio lives in Brunswick, located approximately 17 km from her electorate of Mill Park.

Victorian Legislative Assembly
Preceded by Alex Andrianopoulos	Member for Mill Park; 2002–present	Incumbent
Political offices
Preceded by Peter Batchelor	Minister for Community Development (Victoria); 2010	Succeeded by Mary Wooldridge (Community Services)
