= Alex Andrianopoulos =

Australian politician

The Honourable Alex Andrianopoulos

Speaker of the Victorian Legislative Assembly
- In office 3 November 1999 – 24 February 2002
- Preceded by: Jim Plowman
- Succeeded by: Judy Maddigan

Member of the Victorian Legislative Assembly for St Albans
- In office 2 March 1985 – 14 August 1992
- Preceded by: New seat
- Succeeded by: Abolished

Member of the Victorian Legislative Assembly for Mill Park
- In office 3 October 1992 – 4 November 2002
- Preceded by: New seat
- Succeeded by: Lily D'Ambrosio

Personal details
- Born: 1 January 1955 (age 71) Tripoli, Greece
- Party: Labor

Alex Andrianopoulos (born 1 January 1955) is an Australian former politician. He was a Labor member of the Victorian Legislative Assembly, representing St Albans from 1985 to 1992 and Mill Park from 1992 to 2002. He was Speaker from 1999 to 2002.

Andrianopoulos was born in Tselepakou in Tripoli, Greece, and was educated in the St Albans, Victoria, his family having migrated to Australia in 1965. He joined the Labor Party in 1974. In 1976, he became a paymaster with Modern Maid & Staff, and in 1980 he was elected to Keilor City Council. He served on the council until 1984, and was also an electorate officer from 1982 to 1985.

In 1985, Andrianopoulos won the Victorian Legislative Assembly seat of St Albans for the ALP, and moved to Mill Park in 1992 when his former seat was abolished. He was briefly Shadow Minister for Ethnic Affairs from March to December 1993, and was Secretary to the Shadow Cabinet from October 1992 to March 1993, and again from December 1993 to October 1999. When Labor won office under Steve Bracks in the 1999 state election, Andrianopoulos was elected Speaker of the Assembly. He held the post until his retirement from politics in 2002.

Parliament of Victoria
Preceded by Jim Plowman	Speaker; 1999–2002	Succeeded by Judy Maddigan
Preceded by New seat	Member for St Albans; 1985–1992	Succeeded by Seat abolished
Preceded by New seat	Member for Mill Park; 1992–2002	Succeeded by Lily D'Ambrosio
