= Electoral district of St Albans =

State electoral district of Victoria, Australia

St Albans Victoria—Legislative Assembly
- Interactive map of electoral district boundaries from the 2022 state election
- State: Victoria
- Dates current: 1985–1992; 2014–present
- MP: Natalie Suleyman
- Party: Labor
- Namesake: St Albans
- Electors: 46,678 (2018)
- Area: 35 km^{2} (13.5 sq mi)
- Demographic: Inner-metropolitan

The electoral district of St Albans is an electoral district of the Victorian Legislative Assembly. It has existed in 2 incarnations, first from 1985 to 1992, and was created again in the 2013 redistribution and came into effect at the 2014 state election.

It largely covers the area of the abolished seat of Derrimut, including the Melbourne outer western suburbs of St Albans, Sunshine, Keilor Downs, Kealba, Albion and Ardeer.

St Albans was retained at the 2014 election by Labor candidate Natalie Suleyman.

== Members for St Albans ==
First incarnation (1985–1992)
Member	Party	Term
Alex Andrianopoulos	Labor	1985–1992

Second incarnation (2014–)
Member	Party	Term
Natalie Suleyman	Labor	2014–present

== Election results ==
2022 Victorian state election: St Albans
Party	Candidate	Votes	%	±%
Labor	Natalie Suleyman	15,094	42.3	−18.4
Liberal	Maria Kerr	9,066	25.4	+1.4
Democratic Labour	Mark Hobart	2,735	7.7	+7.7
Greens	Joel Bentley	2,416	6.8	−4.5
Victorian Socialists	Van Thanh Rudd	2,367	6.6	+6.6
Independent	Virginia Tachos	1,152	3.2	+3.2
Family First	Russell Walton	1,038	2.9	+2.9
Freedom	Kim J. Cullen	874	2.4	+2.4
Animal Justice	Jason Caracassis	782	2.2	+1.2
New Democrats	Zaffer Mannan	192	0.5	+0.5
Total formal votes		35,716	90.8	−1.9
Informal votes		3,638	9.2	+1.9
Turnout		39,354	84.7	−1.6
Two-party-preferred result
Labor	Natalie Suleyman	21,274	59.6	−12.4
Liberal	Maria Kerr	14,442	40.4	+12.4
Labor hold		Swing	−12.4	
