= Beth Gleeson =

Australian politician

Member of the Victorian Legislative Assembly for Thomastown
- In office 2 March 1985 – 16 December 1989
- Preceded by: New seat
- Succeeded by: Peter Batchelor

Personal details
- Born: 7 March 1943 Richmond, Victoria
- Died: 16 December 1989 (aged 46)
- Party: Labor Party

Elizabeth Susan Gleeson (7 March 1943 – 16 December 1989) was an Australian politician.

She was born in Warrnambool, where she attended St Anne's College. She received a Bachelor of Arts from La Trobe University, after which she worked as a research assistant to federal MP Harry Jenkins. A Labor Party member, she was a delegate to the state conference and was campaign director for John Cain.

In 1985, she was elected to the Victorian Legislative Assembly as the member for Thomastown, but died in 1989 while still in office.

Victorian Legislative Assembly
New seat	Member for Thomastown; 1985–1989	Succeeded by Peter Batchelor
