= Electoral district of Thomastown =

State electoral district of Victoria, Australia

Thomastown Victoria—Legislative Assembly
- Interactive map of electoral district boundaries from the 2022 state election
- State: Victoria
- MP: Bronwyn Halfpenny
- Party: Labor Party
- Namesake: Thomastown
- Electors: 44,619 (2018)
- Area: 91 km^{2} (35.1 sq mi)
- Demographic: Metropolitan

The electoral district of Thomastown is an electorate of the Victorian Legislative Assembly. It currently includes the suburbs of Lalor and Thomastown, and parts of Fawkner, Reservoir and Wollert, and has been in existence since 1985.

The seat is extremely safe for the Labor Party. At the 2002 election, Labor frontbencher Peter Batchelor won the seat with over 80% of the two-party-preferred vote, making Thomastown the safest seat in the state.

The seat's first member, Beth Gleeson, died whilst in office in December 1989. The resulting February 1990 by-election, held when support for Labor had plummeted as a result of an economic crisis, was nearly won by the Australian Democrats.

== Members for Thomastown ==
Member	Party	Term
Beth Gleeson	Labor	1985–1989
Peter Batchelor	Labor	1990–2010
Bronwyn Halfpenny	Labor	2010–present

== Election results ==
2022 Victorian state election: Thomastown
Party	Candidate	Votes	%	±%
Labor	Bronwyn Halfpenny	19,396	51.7	−10.1
Liberal	Gurdawar Singh	9,003	24.0	+8.8
Victorian Socialists	Kelly Cvetkova	2,873	7.7	+4.8
Family First	Colleen McNamara	2,571	6.9	+6.9
Greens	Matt Sinapi	2,557	6.8	+2.7
Animal Justice	Evie Levens	1,076	2.9	+0.4
Total formal votes		37,429	92.2	+4.2
Informal votes		3,151	7.8	−4.2
Turnout		40,580	85.2	+1.6
Two-party-preferred result
Labor	Bronwyn Halfpenny	24,628	65.8	−11.6
Liberal	Gurdawar Singh	12,801	34.2	+11.6
Labor hold		Swing	−11.6	

== See also ==
- Parliaments of the Australian states and territories
- List of members of the Victorian Legislative Assembly
