= Members of the Victorian Legislative Assembly, 2006–2010 =

- ←2002–2006 2010–2014→

This is a list of members of the Victorian Legislative Assembly from 2006 to 2010:

Name	Party	Electorate	Term in office
Jacinta Allan	Labor	Bendigo East	1999–present
Daniel Andrews	Labor	Mulgrave	2002–2023
Hon Louise Asher	Liberal	Brighton	1999–2018
Ted Baillieu	Liberal	Hawthorn	1999–2014
Ann Barker	Labor	Oakleigh	1988–1992, 1999–2014
Hon Peter Batchelor	Labor	Thomastown	1990–2010
Liz Beattie	Labor	Yuroke	1999–2014
Gary Blackwood	Liberal	Narracan	2006–2022
Hon Steve Bracks^{[1]}	Labor	Williamstown	1994–2007
Colin Brooks	Labor	Bundoora	2006–present
Hon John Brumby	Labor	Broadmeadows	1993–2010
Neale Burgess	Liberal	Hastings	2006–2022
Hon Bob Cameron	Labor	Bendigo West	1996–2010
Hon Christine Campbell	Labor	Pascoe Vale	1996–2014
Carlo Carli	Labor	Brunswick	1994–2010
Robert Clark	Liberal	Box Hill	1988–2018
Peter Crisp	National	Mildura	2006–2018
Michael Crutchfield	Labor	South Barwon	2002–2010
Lily D'Ambrosio	Labor	Mill Park	2002–present
Hugh Delahunty	National	Lowan	1999–2014
Martin Dixon	Liberal	Nepean	1996–2018
Luke Donnellan	Labor	Narre Warren North	2002–2022
Joanne Duncan	Labor	Macedon	1999–2014
John Eren	Labor	Lara	2006–present
Martin Foley^{[2]}	Labor	Albert Park	2007–2022
Christine Fyffe	Liberal	Evelyn	1999–2002, 2006–2018
Judith Graley	Labor	Narre Warren South	2006–2018
Danielle Green	Labor	Yan Yean	2002–2022
Hon Andre Haermeyer^{[3]}	Labor	Kororoit	1992–2008
Ben Hardman	Labor	Seymour	1999–2010
Alistair Harkness	Labor	Frankston	2002–2010
Joe Helper	Labor	Ripon	1999–2014
Jill Hennessy^{[4]}	Labor	Altona	2010–2022
Steve Herbert	Labor	Eltham	2002–2014
David Hodgett	Liberal	Kilsyth	2006–present
Hon Tim Holding	Labor	Lyndhurst	1999–2013
Geoff Howard	Labor	Ballarat East	1999–2018
Rob Hudson	Labor	Bentleigh	2002–2010
Hon Rob Hulls	Labor	Niddrie	1996–2012
Craig Ingram	Independent	Gippsland East	1999–2010
Ken Jasper	National	Murray Valley	1976–2010
Marlene Kairouz^{[3]}	Labor	Kororoit	2008–2022
Hon Lynne Kosky^{[4]}	Labor	Altona	1996–2010
Nicholas Kotsiras	Liberal	Bulleen	1999–2014
Craig Langdon^{[5]}	Labor	Ivanhoe	1996–2010
Telmo Languiller	Labor	Derrimut	1999–2018
Hong Lim	Labor	Clayton	1996–2018
Jenny Lindell	Labor	Carrum	1999–2010
Tammy Lobato	Labor	Gembrook	2002–2010
Tony Lupton	Labor	Prahran	2002–2010
Judy Maddigan	Labor	Essendon	1996–2010
Kirstie Marshall	Labor	Forest Hill	2002–2010
Andrew McIntosh	Liberal	Kew	1999–2014
James Merlino	Labor	Monbulk	2002–2022
Maxine Morand	Labor	Mount Waverley	2002–2010
David Morris	Liberal	Mornington	2006–2022
Terry Mulder	Liberal	Polwarth	1999–2015
Janice Munt	Labor	Mordialloc	2002–2010
Hon Denis Napthine	Liberal	South-West Coast	1988–2015
Don Nardella	Labor	Melton	1999–2018
Lisa Neville	Labor	Bellarine	2002–2022
Wade Noonan^{[1]}	Labor	Williamstown	2007–2018
Russell Northe	National	Morwell	2006–2022
Michael O'Brien	Liberal	Malvern	2006–present
Karen Overington	Labor	Ballarat West	1999–2010
Tim Pallas	Labor	Tarneit	2006–2025
Hon John Pandazopoulos	Labor	Dandenong	1992–2014
Jude Perera	Labor	Cranbourne	2002–2018
Hon Bronwyn Pike	Labor	Melbourne	1999–2012
Jeanette Powell	National	Shepparton	2002–2014
Fiona Richardson	Labor	Northcote	2006–2017
Tony Robinson	Labor	Mitcham	1997–2010
Peter Ryan	National	Gippsland South	1992–2015
Robin Scott	Labor	Preston	2006–2022
George Seitz	Labor	Keilor	1982–2010
Helen Shardey	Liberal	Caulfield	1996–2010
Ken Smith	Liberal	Bass	2002–2014
Ryan Smith	Liberal	Warrandyte	2006–2023
Bob Stensholt	Labor	Burwood	1999–2010
Dr Bill Sykes	National	Benalla	2002–2014
Murray Thompson	Liberal	Sandringham	1992–2018
Marsha Thomson	Labor	Footscray	2006–2018
Hon John Thwaites^{[2]}	Labor	Albert Park	1992–2007
Bill Tilley	Liberal	Benambra	2006–present
Ian Trezise	Labor	Geelong	1999–2014
Heidi Victoria	Liberal	Bayswater	2006–2018
Nick Wakeling	Liberal	Ferntree Gully	2006–2022
Peter Walsh	National	Swan Hill	2002–present
Paul Weller	National	Rodney	2006–2014
Kim Wells	Liberal	Scoresby	1992–present
Mary Wooldridge	Liberal	Doncaster	2006–2014
Richard Wynne	Labor	Richmond	1999–2022

^{1} On 6 August 2007, the Labor member for Williamstown and Premier of Victoria, Steve Bracks, resigned. Labor candidate Wade Noonan won the resulting by-election on 15 September 2007.
^{2} On 6 August 2007, the Labor member for Albert Park and Deputy Premier of Victoria, John Thwaites, resigned. Labor candidate Martin Foley won the resulting by-election on 15 September 2007.
^{3} On 2 June 2008, the Labor member for Kororoit, Andre Haermeyer, resigned. Labor candidate Marlene Kairouz won the resulting by-election on 28 June 2008.
^{4} On 18 January 2010, the Labor member for Altona, Lynne Kosky, resigned. Labor candidate Jill Hennessy won the resulting by-election on 13 February 2010.
^{5} On 25 August 2010, the Labor member for Ivanhoe, Craig Langdon, resigned. No by-election was held due to the proximity of the next election.
