= Members of the Victorian Legislative Assembly, 2010–2014 =

- ←2006–2010 2014–2018→

This is a list of members of the Victorian Legislative Assembly from 2010 to 2014:

Name	Party	Electorate	Term in office
Hon Jacinta Allan	Labor	Bendigo East	1999–present
Hon Daniel Andrews	Labor	Mulgrave	2002–2023
Neil Angus	Liberal	Forest Hill	2010–2022
Hon Louise Asher	Liberal	Brighton	1999–2018
Hon Ted Baillieu	Liberal	Hawthorn	1999–2014
Ann Barker	Labor	Oakleigh	1988–1992, 1999–2014
Brad Battin	Liberal	Gembrook	2010–present
Donna Bauer	Liberal	Carrum	2010–2014
Liz Beattie	Labor	Yuroke	1999–2014
Gary Blackwood	Liberal	Narracan	2006–2022
Colin Brooks	Labor	Bundoora	2006–present
Hon John Brumby^{[1]}	Labor	Broadmeadows	1993–2010
Tim Bull	National	Gippsland East	2010–present
Neale Burgess	Liberal	Hastings	2006–2022
Hon Christine Campbell	Labor	Pascoe Vale	1996–2014
Anthony Carbines	Labor	Ivanhoe	2010–present
Ben Carroll^{[2]}	Labor	Niddrie	2012–present
Hon Robert Clark	Liberal	Box Hill	1988–2018
Peter Crisp	National	Mildura	2006–2018
Lily D'Ambrosio	Labor	Mill Park	2002–present
Hon Hugh Delahunty	National	Lowan	1999–2014
Hon Martin Dixon	Liberal	Nepean	1996–2018
Luke Donnellan	Labor	Narre Warren North	2002–2022
Joanne Duncan	Labor	Macedon	1999–2014
Maree Edwards	Labor	Bendigo West	2010–present
John Eren	Labor	Lara	2006–present
Martin Foley	Labor	Albert Park	2007–2022
Christine Fyffe	Liberal	Evelyn	1999–2002, 2006–2018
Jane Garrett	Labor	Brunswick	2010–2018
Michael Gidley	Liberal	Mount Waverley	2010–2018
Judith Graley	Labor	Narre Warren South	2006–2018
Danielle Green	Labor	Yan Yean	2002–2022
Bronwyn Halfpenny	Labor	Thomastown	2010–present
Joe Helper	Labor	Ripon	1999–2014
Jill Hennessy	Labor	Altona	2010–2022
Steve Herbert	Labor	Eltham	2002–2014
David Hodgett	Liberal	Kilsyth	2006–present
Hon Tim Holding^{[4]}	Labor	Lyndhurst	1999–2013
Geoff Howard	Labor	Ballarat East	1999–2018
Hon Rob Hulls^{[2]}	Labor	Niddrie	1996–2012
Natalie Hutchins	Labor	Keilor	2010–present
Marlene Kairouz	Labor	Kororoit	2008–2022
Jennifer Kanis^{[3]}	Labor	Melbourne	2012–2014
Andrew Katos	Liberal	South Barwon	2010–2018
Sharon Knight	Labor	Ballarat West	2010–2018
Nicholas Kotsiras	Liberal	Bulleen	1999–2014
Telmo Languiller	Labor	Derrimut	1999–2018
Hong Lim	Labor	Clayton	1996–2018
Hon Justin Madden	Labor	Essendon	2010–2014
Tim McCurdy	National	Murray Valley	2010–present
Frank McGuire^{[1]}	Labor	Broadmeadows	2011–2022
Hon Andrew McIntosh	Liberal	Kew	1999–2014
Cindy McLeish	Liberal	Seymour	2010–present
James Merlino	Labor	Monbulk	2002–2022
Elizabeth Miller	Liberal	Bentleigh	2010–2014
David Morris	Liberal	Mornington	2006–2022
Hon Terry Mulder	Liberal	Polwarth	1999–2015
Hon Denis Napthine	Liberal	South-West Coast	1988–2015
Don Nardella	Labor	Melton	1999–2018
Clem Newton-Brown	Liberal	Prahran	2010–2014
Lisa Neville	Labor	Bellarine	2002–2022
Wade Noonan	Labor	Williamstown	2007–2018
Russell Northe	National	Morwell	2006–2022
Hon Michael O'Brien	Liberal	Malvern	2006–present
Hon Martin Pakula^{[4]}	Labor	Lyndhurst	2013–2022
Tim Pallas	Labor	Tarneit	2006–2025
Hon John Pandazopoulos	Labor	Dandenong	1992–2014
Jude Perera	Labor	Cranbourne	2002–2018
Hon Bronwyn Pike^{[3]}	Labor	Melbourne	1999–2012
Hon Jeanette Powell	National	Shepparton	2002–2014
Fiona Richardson	Labor	Northcote	2006–2017
Dee Ryall	Liberal	Mitcham	2010–2018
Hon Peter Ryan	National	Gippsland South	1992–2015
Robin Scott	Labor	Preston	2006–2022
Geoff Shaw^{[5]}	Liberal/Independent	Frankston	2010–2014
Hon Ken Smith	Liberal	Bass	2002–2014
Hon Ryan Smith	Liberal	Warrandyte	2006–2023
David Southwick	Liberal	Caulfield	2010–present
Dr Bill Sykes	National	Benalla	2002–2014
Murray Thompson	Liberal	Sandringham	1992–2018
Marsha Thomson	Labor	Footscray	2006–2018
Bill Tilley	Liberal	Benambra	2006–present
Ian Trezise	Labor	Geelong	1999–2014
Heidi Victoria	Liberal	Bayswater	2006–2018
Nick Wakeling	Liberal	Ferntree Gully	2006–2022
Hon Peter Walsh	National	Swan Hill	2002–present
Graham Watt	Liberal	Burwood	2010–2018
Paul Weller	National	Rodney	2006–2014
Hon Kim Wells	Liberal	Scoresby	1992–present
Hon Mary Wooldridge	Liberal	Doncaster	2006–2014
Lorraine Wreford	Liberal	Mordialloc	2010–2014
Hon Richard Wynne	Labor	Richmond	1999–2022

^{1} On 21 December 2010, the Labor member for Broadmeadows and former Premier of Victoria, John Brumby, resigned. Labor candidate Frank McGuire won the resulting by-election on 19 February 2011.
^{2} On 27 January 2012, the Labor member for Niddrie, Rob Hulls, resigned. Labor candidate Ben Carroll won the resulting by-election on 24 March 2012.
^{3} On 7 May 2012, the Labor member for Melbourne, Bronwyn Pike, resigned. Labor candidate Jennifer Kanis won the resulting by-election on 21 July 2012.
^{4} On 18 February 2013, the Labor member for Lyndhurst, Tim Holding, resigned. Labor candidate Martin Pakula won the resulting by-election on 27 April 2013.
^{5} On 6 March 2013, the member for Frankston, Geoff Shaw, resigned from the parliamentary Liberal Party and moved to the crossbenches as an independent.
