= Members of the Victorian Legislative Assembly, 2002–2006 =

- ←1999–2002 2006–2010→

This is a list of members of the Victorian Legislative Assembly from 2002 to 2006:

Name	Party	Electorate	Term in office
Jacinta Allan	Labor	Bendigo East	1999–present
Daniel Andrews	Labor	Mulgrave	2002–2023
Hon Louise Asher	Liberal	Brighton	1999–2018
Ted Baillieu	Liberal	Hawthorn	1999–2014
Ann Barker	Labor	Oakleigh	1988–1992, 1999–2014
Hon Peter Batchelor	Labor	Thomastown	1990–2010
Dympna Beard	Labor	Kilsyth	2002–2006
Liz Beattie	Labor	Yuroke	1999–2014
Hon Steve Bracks	Labor	Williamstown	1994–2007
Hon John Brumby	Labor	Broadmeadows	1993–2010
Rosy Buchanan	Labor	Hastings	2002–2006
Hon Bob Cameron	Labor	Bendigo West	1996–2010
Hon Christine Campbell	Labor	Pascoe Vale	1996–2014
Carlo Carli	Labor	Brunswick	1994–2010
Robert Clark	Liberal	Box Hill	1988–2018
Hon Robin Cooper	Liberal	Mornington	1985–2006
Michael Crutchfield	Labor	South Barwon	2002–2010
Lily D'Ambrosio	Labor	Mill Park	2002–present
Hugh Delahunty	National	Lowan	1999–2014
Mary Delahunty	Labor	Northcote	1998–2006
Martin Dixon	Liberal	Nepean	1996–2018
Luke Donnellan	Labor	Narre Warren North	2002–2022
Robert Doyle	Liberal	Malvern	1992–2006
Joanne Duncan	Labor	Macedon	1999–2014
Anne Eckstein	Labor	Ferntree Gully	2002–2006
Hon Sherryl Garbutt	Labor	Bundoora	1989–2006
Mary Gillett	Labor	Tarneit	1996–2006
Danielle Green	Labor	Yan Yean	2002–2022
Hon Andre Haermeyer	Labor	Kororoit	1992–2008
Ben Hardman	Labor	Seymour	1999–2010
Alistair Harkness	Labor	Frankston	2002–2010
Joe Helper	Labor	Ripon	1999–2014
Steve Herbert	Labor	Eltham	2002–2014
Hon Tim Holding	Labor	Lyndhurst	1999–2013
Hon Phil Honeywood	Liberal	Warrandyte	1988–2006
Geoff Howard	Labor	Ballarat East	1999–2018
Rob Hudson	Labor	Bentleigh	2002–2010
Hon Rob Hulls	Labor	Niddrie	1996–2012
Craig Ingram	Independent	Gippsland East	1999–2010
Ken Jasper	National	Murray Valley	1976–2010
Brendan Jenkins	Labor	Morwell	2002–2006
Hon Lynne Kosky	Labor	Altona	1996–2010
Nicholas Kotsiras	Liberal	Bulleen	1999–2014
Craig Langdon	Labor	Ivanhoe	1996–2010
Telmo Languiller	Labor	Derrimut	1999–2018
Michael Leighton	Labor	Preston	1988–2006
Hong Lim	Labor	Clayton	1996–2018
Jenny Lindell	Labor	Carrum	1999–2010
Tammy Lobato	Labor	Gembrook	2002–2010
Peter Lockwood	Labor	Bayswater	2002–2006
Peter Loney	Labor	Lara	1992–2006
Tony Lupton	Labor	Prahran	2002–2010
Judy Maddigan	Labor	Essendon	1996–2010
Kirstie Marshall	Labor	Forest Hill	2002–2010
Noel Maughan	National	Rodney	1989–2006
Ian Maxfield	Labor	Narracan	1999–2006
Andrew McIntosh	Liberal	Kew	1999–2014
Heather McTaggart	Labor	Evelyn	2002–2006
James Merlino	Labor	Monbulk	2002–2022
Bruce Mildenhall	Labor	Footscray	1992–2006
Maxine Morand	Labor	Mount Waverley	2002–2010
Terry Mulder	Liberal	Polwarth	1999–2015
Janice Munt	Labor	Mordialloc	2002–2010
Hon Denis Napthine	Liberal	South-West Coast	1988–2015
Don Nardella	Labor	Melton	1999–2018
Lisa Neville	Labor	Bellarine	2002–2022
Karen Overington	Labor	Ballarat West	1999–2010
Hon John Pandazopoulos	Labor	Dandenong	1992–2014
Jude Perera	Labor	Cranbourne	2002–2018
Victor Perton	Liberal	Doncaster	1988–2006
Hon Bronwyn Pike	Labor	Melbourne	1999–2012
Tony Plowman	Liberal	Benambra	1992–2006
Jeanette Powell	National	Shepparton	2002–2014
Tony Robinson	Labor	Mitcham	1997–2010
Peter Ryan	National	Gippsland South	1992–2015
Russell Savage	Independent	Mildura	1996–2006
George Seitz	Labor	Keilor	1982–2010
Helen Shardey	Liberal	Caulfield	1996–2010
Ken Smith	Liberal	Bass	2002–2014
Bob Stensholt	Labor	Burwood	1999–2010
Dr Bill Sykes	National	Benalla	2002–2014
Murray Thompson	Liberal	Sandringham	1992–2018
Hon John Thwaites	Labor	Albert Park	1992–2007
Ian Trezise	Labor	Geelong	1999–2014
Peter Walsh	National	Swan Hill	2002–present
Kim Wells	Liberal	Scoresby	1992–present
Dale Wilson	Labor	Narre Warren South	2002–2006
Richard Wynne	Labor	Richmond	1999–2022
