= Electoral results for the district of Altona =

Australian Election Results in the district of Altona

This is a list of electoral results for the electoral district of Altona in Victorian state elections from 1992 to the present.

== Members for Altona ==
Member	Party	Term
Carole Marple	Labor	1992–1996
Lynne Kosky	Labor	1996–2010
Jill Hennessy	Labor	2010–2022

== Election results ==
=== Elections in the 2010s ===
2018 Victorian state election: Altona
Party	Candidate	Votes	%	±%
Labor	Jill Hennessy	24,112	51.40	−0.54
Liberal	Christian Martinu	11,194	23.86	−7.58
Independent	Tony Hooper	5,861	12.50	+12.50
Greens	Emma-Jane Byrne	4,217	8.99	−1.04
Independent	Maria Aylward	1,522	3.24	+3.24
Total formal votes		46,906	94.56	+0.01
Informal votes		2,699	5.44	−0.01
Turnout		49,605	89.51	−3.13
Two-party-preferred result
Labor	Jill Hennessy	30,264	64.57	+2.01
Liberal	Christian Martinu	16,607	35.43	−2.01
Labor hold		Swing	+2.01	

2014 Victorian state election: Altona
Party	Candidate	Votes	%	±%
Labor	Jill Hennessy	20,608	52.3	+1.3
Liberal	Nihal Samara	12,486	31.7	−1.7
Greens	Chris De Bono	3,799	9.6	−0.7
Christians	Anthony O'Neill	994	2.5	+2.5
Voice for the West	Jemal Hiabu	902	2.3	+2.3
Independent	Brijender Nain	614	1.6	−0.4
Total formal votes		39,403	94.6	+1.5
Informal votes		2,267	5.4	−1.5
Turnout		41,670	86.7	
Two-party-preferred result
Labor	Jill Hennessy	24,708	62.6	+0.2
Liberal	Nihal Samara	14,750	37.4	−0.2
Labor hold		Swing	+0.2	

2010 Victorian state election: Altona
Party	Candidate	Votes	%	±%
Labor	Jill Hennessy	22,954	51.02	–9.59
Liberal	Mark Rose	14,944	33.22	+9.33
Greens	David Strangward	4,516	10.04	+1.62
Family First	Elizabeth Mumby	1,582	3.52	–3.56
Independent	Brijender Nain	991	2.20	+2.20
Total formal votes		44,987	94.68	+0.79
Informal votes		2,529	5.32	–0.79
Turnout		47,516	92.92	–0.77
Two-party-preferred result
Labor	Jill Hennessy	27,886	61.96	–8.25
Liberal	Mark Rose	17,117	38.04	+8.25
Labor hold		Swing	–8.25	

2010 Altona state by-election
Party	Candidate	Votes	%	±%
Labor	Jill Hennessy	18,249	47.50	−13.11
Liberal	Mark Rose	13,427	34.95	+11.06
Greens	David Strangward	4,006	10.43	+2.01
Independent	Liz Mumby	693	1.80	+1.80
Independent	Brijender Nain	634	1.65	+1.65
Independent	Brian Shaw	623	1.62	+1.62
Socialist Alliance	Margarita Windisch	607	1.58	+1.58
Independent	Andrew Rixon	182	0.47	+0.47
Total formal votes		38,421	95.18	+1.29
Informal votes		1,947	4.82	−1.29
Turnout		40,368	93.69	−9.03
Two-party-preferred result
Labor	Jill Hennessy	22,252	57.93	−12.28
Liberal	Mark Rose	16,160	42.07	+12.28
Labor hold		Swing	−12.28	

=== Elections in the 2000s ===
2006 Victorian state election: Altona
Party	Candidate	Votes	%	±%
Labor	Lynne Kosky	22,332	60.61	−7.52
Liberal	Ian Soylemez	8,804	23.89	+1.01
Greens	Andreas Bischof	3,101	8.42	−0.57
Family First	David Bernard	2,609	7.08	+7.08
Total formal votes		36,846	93.89	−1.99
Informal votes		2,398	6.11	+1.99
Turnout		39,244	93.69	+0.03
Two-party-preferred result
Labor	Lynne Kosky	25,869	70.21	−4.48
Liberal	Ian Soylemez	10,974	29.79	+4.48
Labor hold		Swing	−4.48	

2002 Victorian state election: Altona
Party	Candidate	Votes	%	±%
Labor	Lynne Kosky	21,888	68.13	+3.47
Liberal	Steve Lambrinakos	7,349	22.88	−12.46
Greens	Tony Briffa	2,888	8.99	+8.99
Total formal votes		32,125	95.88	−0.36
Informal votes		1,381	4.12	+0.36
Turnout		33,506	93.66	−0.96
Two-party-preferred result
Labor	Lynne Kosky	23,995	74.69	+10.06
Liberal	Steve Lambrinakos	8,130	25.31	−10.06
Labor hold		Swing	+10.06	

=== Elections in the 1990s ===
1999 Victorian state election: Altona
Party	Candidate	Votes	%	±%
Labor	Lynne Kosky	21,545	64.7	+6.5
Liberal	Steve Lambrinakos	11,774	35.3	−6.5
Total formal votes		33,319	96.2	−0.9
Informal votes		1,303	3.8	+0.9
Turnout		34,622	94.6	
Labor hold		Swing	+6.5	

1996 Victorian state election: Altona
Party	Candidate	Votes	%	±%
Labor	Lynne Kosky	17,323	56.8	+3.8
Liberal	Teresa Thompson	12,045	39.5	+6.0
Natural Law	Marco Andreacchio	1,145	3.8	−1.9
Total formal votes		30,513	97.2	+1.7
Informal votes		895	2.8	−1.7
Turnout		31,408	94.5	
Two-party-preferred result
Labor	Lynne Kosky	17,739	58.2	−2.7
Liberal	Teresa Thompson	12,737	41.8	+2.7
Labor hold		Swing	−2.7	

1992 Victorian state election: Altona
Party	Candidate	Votes	%	±%
Labor	Carole Marple	14,651	52.9	−8.0
Liberal	Timothy Warner	9,268	33.5	+2.2
Independent	Peter Haberecht	2,196	7.9	+7.9
Natural Law	Leon Staropoli	1,564	5.7	+5.7
Total formal votes		27,679	95.4	+1.1
Informal votes		1,334	4.6	−1.1
Turnout		29,013	95.9	
Two-party-preferred result
Labor	Carole Marple	16,810	60.9	−3.9
Liberal	Timothy Warner	10,807	39.1	+3.9
Labor hold		Swing	−3.9	
