= Electoral results for the district of Lyndhurst =

Australian district election results

This is a list of electoral results for the Electoral district of Lyndhurst in Victorian state elections.

== Members for Lyndhurst ==
Member	Party	Term
Tim Holding	Labor	2002–2013
Martin Pakula	Labor	2013–2014

== Election results ==
=== Elections in the 2010s ===
2013 Lyndhurst state by-election
Party	Candidate	Votes	%	±%
Labor	Martin Pakula	12,844	41.0	–14.5
Family First	Stephen Nowland	4,431	14.1	+9.3
Democratic Labor	Geraldine Gonsalvez	3,447	11.0	+9.8
Independent	Hung Vo	3,058	9.8	+6.2
Greens	Nina Springle	2,946	9.4	+3.3
Sex Party	Martin Leahy	2,623	8.4	+8.4
Independent	David Linaker	1,358	4.3	+4.3
Independent	Bobby Singh	636	2.0	+2.0
Total formal votes		31,343	90.5	–2.4
Informal votes		3,283	9.5	+2.4
Turnout		34,626	79.7	−12.8
Two-candidate-preferred result
Labor	Martin Pakula	17,878	57.0	–6.9
Family First	Stephen Nowland	13,465	43.0	+43.0
Labor hold		Swing	N/A	

2010 Victorian state election: Lyndhurst
Party	Candidate	Votes	%	±%
Labor	Tim Holding	19,820	55.47	−9.82
Liberal	Tony Holland	9,946	27.83	+5.14
Greens	Nina Springle	2,191	6.13	+1.72
Family First	Heather Wheatley	1,744	4.88	−1.54
Independent	Hung Vo	1,277	3.57	+3.57
Democratic Labor	Yien Wang	444	1.24	+1.24
Independent	Gordon Ford	311	0.87	−0.31
Total formal votes		35,733	92.94	−0.43
Informal votes		2,715	7.06	+0.43
Turnout		38,448	92.47	−0.21
Two-party-preferred result
Labor	Tim Holding	22,912	63.91	−7.57
Liberal	Tony Holland	12,941	36.09	+7.57
Labor hold		Swing	−7.57	

=== Elections in the 2000s ===
2006 Victorian state election: Lyndhurst
Party	Candidate	Votes	%	±%
Labor	Tim Holding	20,681	65.3	−3.0
Liberal	Gary Anderton	7,189	22.7	+0.1
Family First	Jenny Walsh	2,035	6.4	+6.4
Greens	Andrew Henley	1,397	4.4	−3.1
Independent	Gordon Ford	375	1.2	−0.5
Total formal votes		31,677	93.4	−1.8
Informal votes		2,249	6.6	+1.8
Turnout		33,926	92.7	
Two-party-preferred result
Labor	Tim Holding	22,642	71.5	−3.6
Liberal	Gary Anderton	9,034	28.5	+3.6
Labor hold		Swing	−3.6	

2002 Victorian state election: Lyndhurst
Party	Candidate	Votes	%	±%
Labor	Tim Holding	20,862	68.3	+10.1
Liberal	Alan Hood	6,906	22.6	−13.7
Greens	Theos Patrinos	2,293	7.5	+7.5
Independent	Gordon Ford	503	1.6	+1.6
Total formal votes		30,564	95.2	−0.3
Informal votes		1,551	4.8	+0.3
Turnout		32,115	92.4	
Two-party-preferred result
Labor	Tim Holding	22,927	75.1	+14.5
Liberal	Alan Hood	7,610	24.9	−14.5
Labor hold		Swing	+14.5	
