= Electoral results for the district of Ferntree Gully =

Australian district election results

This is a list of electoral results for the Electoral district of Ferntree Gully in Victorian state elections.

== Members for Ferntree Gully ==
Member	Party	Term
Anne Eckstein	Labor	2002–2006
Nick Wakeling	Liberal	2006–2022

== Election results ==
=== Elections in the 2010s ===
2018 Victorian state election: Ferntree Gully
Party	Candidate	Votes	%	±%
Liberal	Nick Wakeling	17,614	49.41	−4.49
Labor	Julie Buxton	14,618	41.01	+7.85
Greens	Steve Raymond	3,414	9.58	+0.49
Total formal votes		35,646	94.28	−1.02
Informal votes		2,162	5.72	+1.02
Turnout		37,808	91.90	−0.97
Two-party-preferred result
Liberal	Nick Wakeling	18,407	51.64	−6.10
Labor	Julie Buxton	17,239	48.36	+6.10
Liberal hold		Swing	−6.10	

2014 Victorian state election: Ferntree Gully
Party	Candidate	Votes	%	±%
Liberal	Nick Wakeling	19,452	53.9	−0.9
Labor	Matt Posetti	11,967	33.2	+2.8
Greens	Steve Raymond	3,279	9.1	+1.0
Christians	Robert Roytel	940	2.6	+2.6
Country Alliance	Russell Wulf	451	1.2	+1.2
Total formal votes		36,089	95.3	+0.2
Informal votes		1,781	4.7	−0.2
Turnout		37,870	92.9	−4.7
Two-party-preferred result
Liberal	Nick Wakeling	20,849	57.8	−3.7
Labor	Matt Posetti	15,238	42.2	+3.7
Liberal hold		Swing	−3.7	

2010 Victorian state election: Ferntree Gully
Party	Candidate	Votes	%	±%
Liberal	Nick Wakeling	22,020	55.54	+11.38
Labor	Josh Cullinan	11,768	29.68	−12.39
Greens	Steve Bullock	2,850	7.19	+0.08
Sex Party	Martin Leahy	1,492	3.76	+3.76
Family First	Allister Rouse	957	2.41	−2.15
Democratic Labor	Tanya Murphy	560	1.41	+1.41
Total formal votes		39,467	94.77	+0.10
Informal votes		2,189	5.23	−0.10
Turnout		41,836	94.62	+0.16
Two-party-preferred result
Liberal	Nick Wakeling	24,591	62.00	+11.96
Labor	Josh Cullinan	15,070	38.00	−11.96
Liberal hold		Swing	+11.96	

=== Elections in the 2000s ===
2006 Victorian state election: Ferntree Gully
Party	Candidate	Votes	%	±%
Liberal	Nick Wakeling	16,187	44.16	−1.04
Labor	Anne Eckstein	15,420	42.07	−5.00
Greens	Steve Bullock	2,608	7.11	−0.61
Family First	Allister Rouse	1,673	4.56	+4.56
People Power	Adrian Dowell	635	1.73	+1.73
Citizens Electoral Council	Ross Russell	134	0.37	+0.37
Total formal votes		36,657	94.67	−2.45
Informal votes		2,064	5.33	+2.45
Turnout		38,721	94.46	−0.11
Two-party-preferred result
Liberal	Nick Wakeling	18,342	50.04	+2.35
Labor	Anne Eckstein	18,315	49.96	−2.35
Liberal gain from Labor		Swing	+2.35	

2002 Victorian state election: Ferntree Gully
Party	Candidate	Votes	%	±%
Labor	Anne Eckstein	16,700	47.1	+7.2
Liberal	Hurtle Lupton	16,036	45.2	−11.2
Greens	Stephen Bullock	2,740	7.7	+7.7
Total formal votes		35,476	97.1	−0.4
Informal votes		1,052	2.9	+0.4
Turnout		36,528	94.6	
Two-party-preferred result
Labor	Anne Eckstein	18,548	52.3	+9.9
Liberal	Hurtle Lupton	16,928	47.7	−9.9
Labor gain from Liberal		Swing	+9.9	
