= Electoral results for the district of Keysborough =

Australian district election results

This is a list of electoral results for the Electoral district of Keysborough in Victorian state elections.

== Members for Keysborough ==
Member	Party	Term
Martin Pakula	Labor	2014–2022

== Election results ==
=== Elections in the 2010s ===
2018 Victorian state election: Keysborough
Party	Candidate	Votes	%	±%
Labor	Martin Pakula	20,800	54.61	+1.56
Liberal	Darrel Taylor	10,919	28.67	−3.17
Independent	Hung Vo	2,401	6.30	+0.91
Greens	Ken McAlpine	1,882	4.94	−0.79
Animal Justice	Helen Jeges	1,407	3.69	+3.69
Transport Matters	Usman Mohammed Afzal	680	1.79	+1.79
Total formal votes		38,089	93.26	−0.68
Informal votes		2,752	6.74	+0.68
Turnout		40,841	90.10	−3.07
Two-party-preferred result
Labor	Martin Pakula	24,725	64.85	+2.95
Liberal	Darrel Taylor	13,399	35.15	−2.95
Labor hold		Swing	+2.95	

2014 Victorian state election: Keysborough
Party	Candidate	Votes	%	±%
Labor	Martin Pakula	19,664	53.1	+2.0
Liberal	Adrianne Fleming	11,803	31.8	−0.9
Greens	Susan Fyfield	2,124	5.7	−0.4
Independent	Hung Vo	2,000	5.4	+2.0
Rise Up Australia	Andrew Cunningham	1,088	2.9	+2.9
Independent	Michael Carty	386	1.0	+1.0
Total formal votes		37,094	93.9	+0.8
Informal votes		2,393	6.1	−0.8
Turnout		39,487	93.2	+1.4
Two-party-preferred result
Labor	Martin Pakula	23,013	61.9	+2.4
Liberal	Adrianne Fleming	14,164	38.1	−2.4
Labor hold		Swing	+2.4	
