= Château de Purnon =

Château in Nouvelle-Aquitaine, France

Coordinates: 46°52′14″N 0°10′50″E

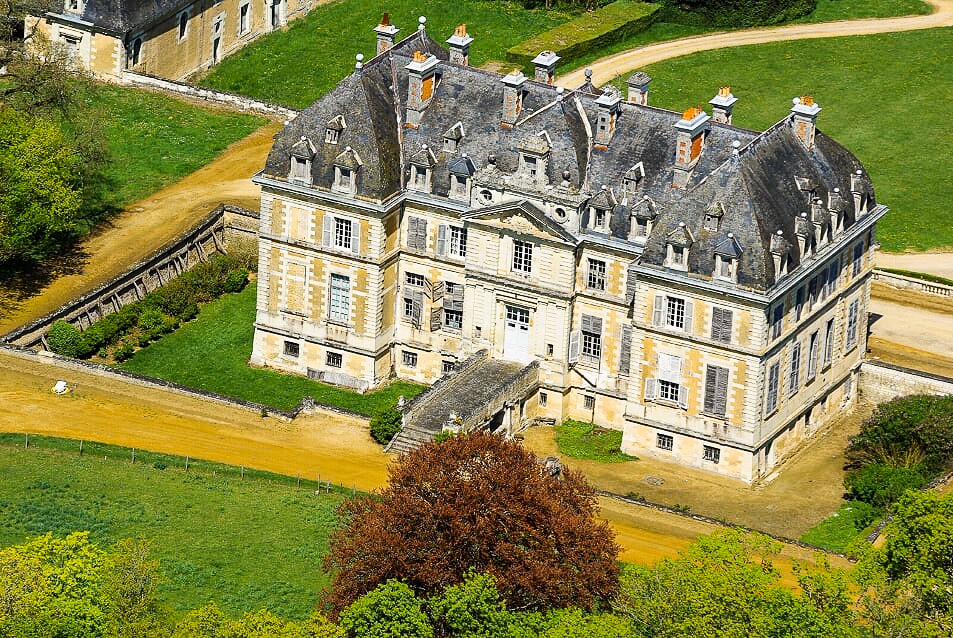
- Château de Purnon, main building surrounded by a dry moat, 2019

General information
- Architectural style: Neoclassical
- Location: Verrue, Vienne, France
- Year built: 1772-1791

Website
- chateaupurnon.com

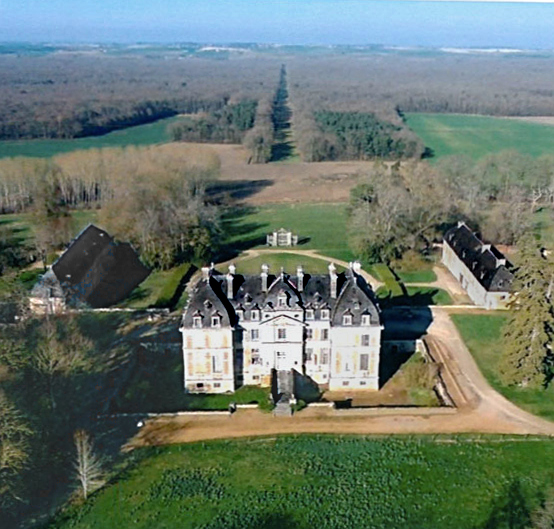
Aerial photo of Château de Purnon, 2020

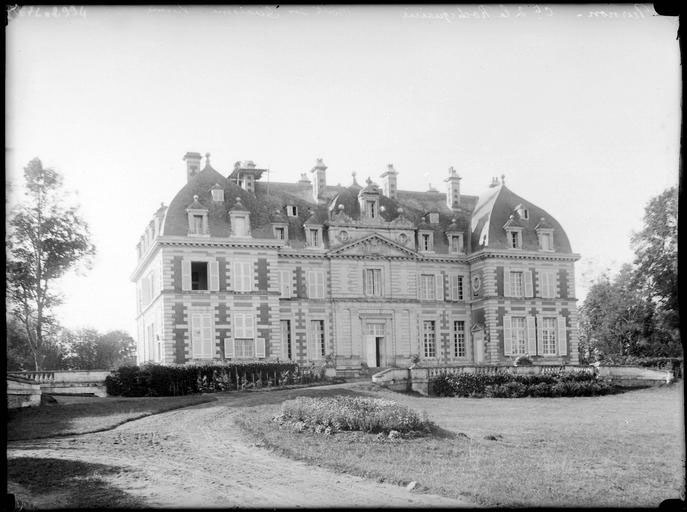
Château de Purnon, c. 1900

Château de Purnon is a neoclassical 18th-century château located in the commune of Verrue in the department of Vienne, south of the Loire Valley in France.

== History ==
The château was constructed between 1779 and 1788 or between 1772 and 1791 for Antoine-Charles Achard, Marquis de la Haye (1737–1816), Colonel in the King Louis XVI's armies between 1771 and 1785, and his wife, Marquise Beninge Modeste de la Motte-Barace (1741–?), from material reclaimed from the ruins of the nearby Château de Brisay.

The architect has been identified as Laurent Bourgeois (1728–1808), in the 2020s, from the original drawings found in the château archives in 2021. In his diagnostic study of October 2020, architect Frédéric Didier wrote: "The Château de Purnon, whose architect remains a mystery, if indeed 'Bourgeois,' an architect in Tours— about whom we know nothing — who signed the elevations in 1781, was the designer and not merely the project manager."

Constructed during the reign of Louis XVI, the château was completed just prior to the commencement of the French Revolution. The château is made of tuffeau stone and covered with ochre plaster, flanked by two large outbuildings, all featuring rare charpente (roof framework) in the style of Philibert de l'Orme. According to architect Frédéric Didier, it is the largest existing example of this style, still intact. A grand allée, constructed between 1788 and 1813, 3 km (1.9 mi) in length, traverses the Forêt de Scévolles from the north of the domain, set over 24 hectares of parkland.

The western outbuilding is 60 metres long and houses a chapel, stables and tack room. The mirroring, opposite eastern outbuilding houses the château laundry and boulangerie. The early 19th century orangery is situated west of the main building. In the pure Neoclassical style characteristic of the late 18th century, the building and its outbuildings are characterized by rectilinear forms and symmetrical rigour. This aesthetic contrasts with English landscape garden park. Also, it has been discovered in 2024, by landscape architect Ian Barker, that in late 18th / early 19th century a vast, formal jardin á la française was laid out to west of the château.

The château was owned in 18th century by Édouard Achard de la Haye, chevalier de l'Ordre souverain de Malte and the mayor of Verrue (1778–1844). After him Purnon was owned by his daughter, Catherine Antoinette de la Haye (1801–1851), who married in 1831 into the baronial de Goyon family. After her the château passed to her daughter Pauline de Goyon, who in 1850 married Count Auguste Henri Fernand de Montesquoiu-Fezensac (1821–1896).

In 1893, or in 1876 Purnon was purchased, by then Count Daniel Jérôme Robineau de Rochequairie, later Marquis de Rochequairie (1856–1919). He notably had a Éolienne Bollée wind turbine installed, a completely innovative system for the time, which allowed the vegetable garden to be irrigated using a wind pump. After his death in 1919, the château slowly fell into ruin for several years. His son by Élizabeth Fournier de Boisayrault-d'Oyron (1865–1901) is Pierre Charles Robineau, Marquis de Rochequairie (1892–1969); his son Gilles Robineau, Marquis de Rochequairie (1922–2013) and his son, Pierre Robineau de Rochequairie. Purnon Estate Operating Company; a private law company was formed in 1982 between Marquis Gilles Robineau de Rochequairie, his nephew Jean-Pierre Robineau de Rochequairie (1924–2008) and his sister-in-law Elisabeth Robineau de Rochequairie.

== Restoration ==
The château and the two main outbuildings, the dry moat, the terraces and the northern entrance gate were all classified as Historical Monuments on 10 May 1995. The Moulin Bijard, the potager garden and pavilion, the rare Éolienne Bollée (unusual wind turbine) from 1900 and its reservoir were listed as Historic Monuments on 11 December 1992.

In 2020, former Australian politician Tim Holding and his fiancée, web designer Felicity Selkirk acquired the château, in a very bad condition after one hundred years of neglect, for €740,000 from the 11 inheritors of the family of de Rochequairie and initiated a comprehensive restoration of the estate.

The very first things to be tackled was preventing further water damage by the badly leaking roof. The northern courtyard and terrace flooded during the rain, due to the breaking and blockage of the 19th century cast iron drainage pipes. However, the much deeper situated 18th century clay drainage pipe system, proved to be in good condition with minimal blockage, during the excavation and inspection performed in 2025.

The Direction régionale des Affaires culturelles of the Nouvelle-Aquitaine region entrusted the project management of the restoration work to Frédéric Didier, chief architect of historical monuments and chief architect of the Palace of Versailles.

In 2022 Château de Purnon was awarded the Mission Stéphane Bern, a national award created in 2018 to support the protection of important French heritage.

Between November 2021 and March 2026, the château's entire 1,200 m² main roof was restored. The work included repairs to the oak charpente (roof frame), the replacement of the 19th-century tin guttering with copper gutters and downpipes, and the installation of 47,000 new hand-cut slate shingles. The restoration included the château's 28 stone dormers and the smaller lucarnes. The finial balls and four busts—including Henry IV, Louis XV, and the Marquis de la Haye—were also restored and repaired. Also 10 chimneys and 46 chimney pots have been restored in 2023. The facade render (19th century concrete removed), tuffeau stonework, windows and the shutters (90 pairs), both front doors, the bridge leading over the moat to the entrance, the western dry moat (former kitchen yard and its auxiliary vaulted spaces in the surrounding wall) have been restored and repaired. By March 2026, of the total of 105 rooms of main building of the Château de Purnon, 11 rooms (five new bathrooms with completely new plumbing and electrical wiring) on the first floor, have been restored and built.

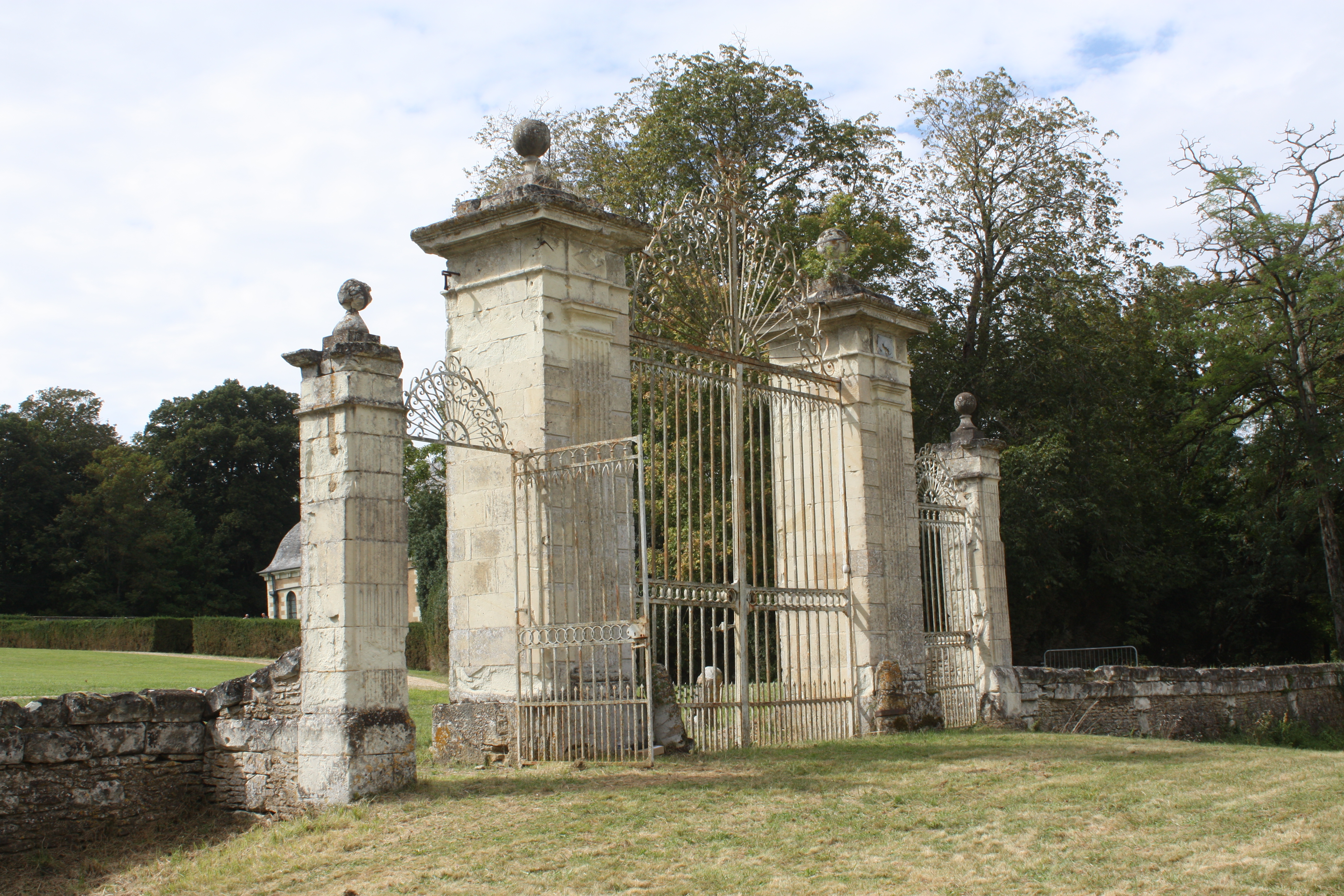
Entrance gate from 1812 to the castle park, 2023.

The total length of 2 km stone wall around the Château de Purnon estate was cleared of the destroying vegetation in 2022. Also the perimeter wall in the bas-cour farm yard has been secured in 2023 and the tiled roof and the roof-frame of the chai (wine barrel room), its stonework and tiled facade have been restored in 2024.

The principal reception rooms and entrance vestibule in the western wing of the ground floor, and the outer wall of the eastern dry moat, will be restored next, starting in 2026. Also the restoration of the 1812 entrance gate will commence. By August 2026, two replicas of the statues were installed on the restored bridge. According to Selkirk, the original lions will be displayed in one of the chateau’s garages for visitors to see during the Journées du Patrimoine.
