= Bush Search and Rescue Victoria =

Volunteer search and rescue group

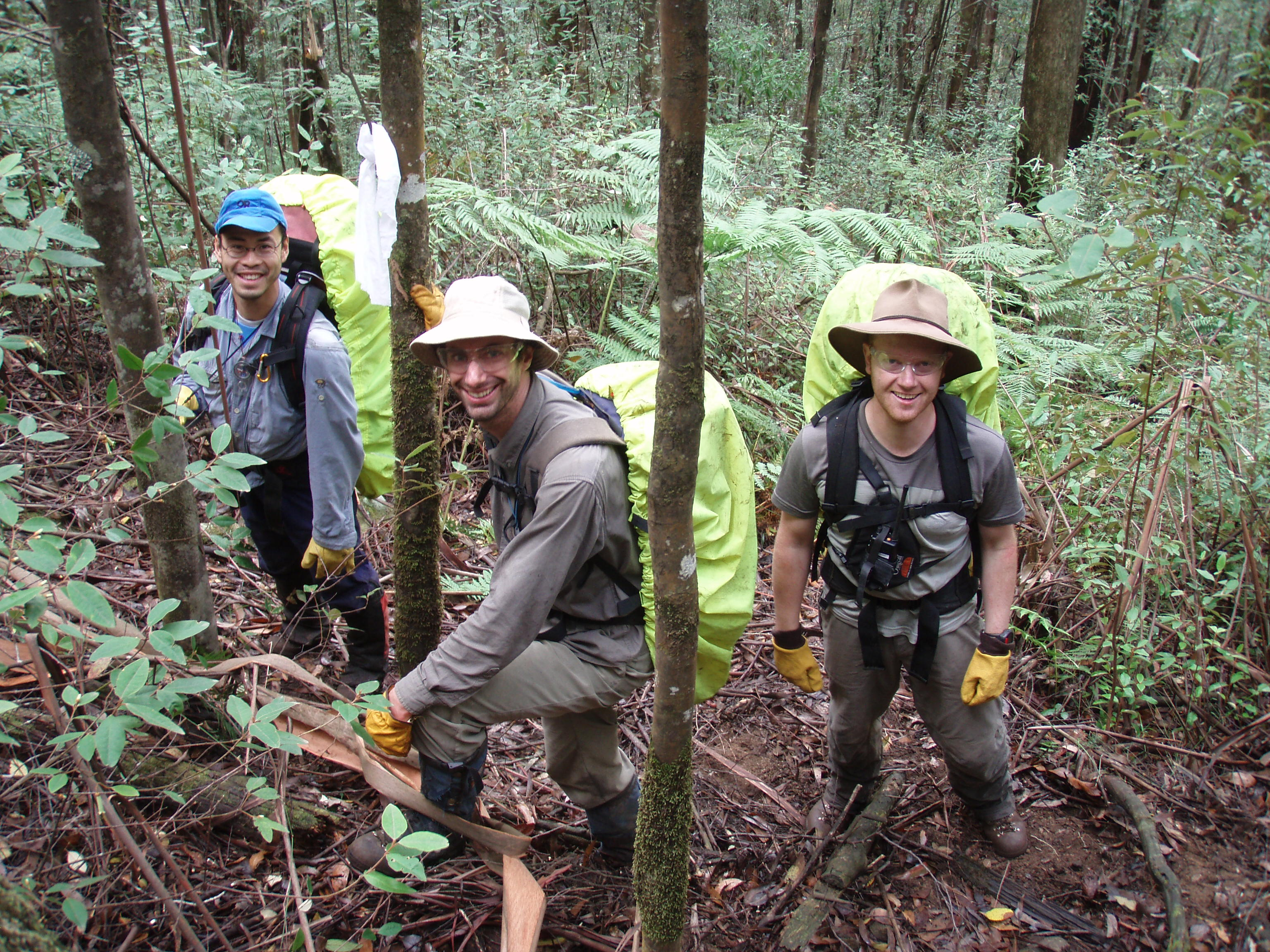
BSAR searchers at Mount Dom Dom

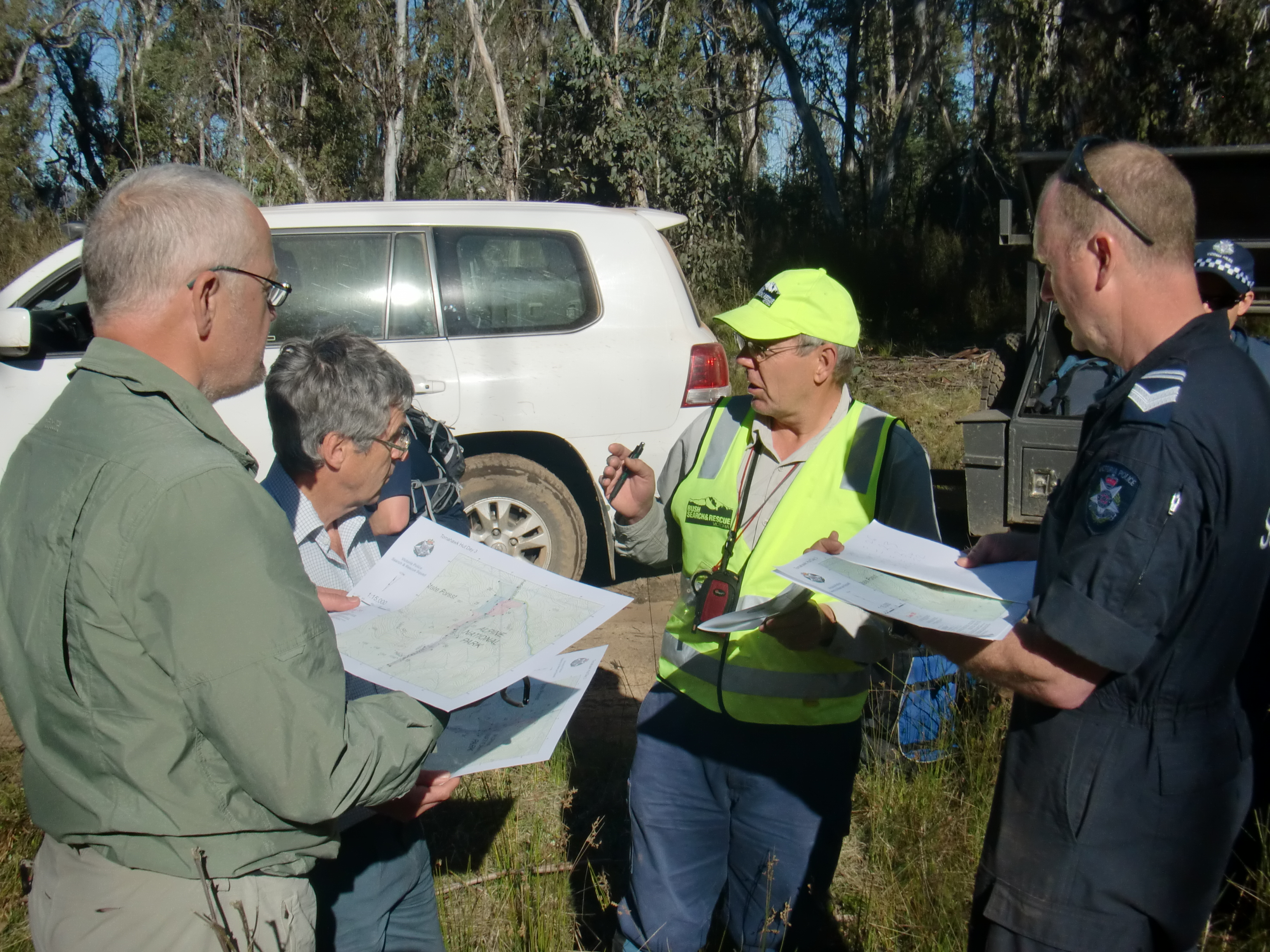
BSAR searchers briefed by Victoria Police SAR

Bush Search and Rescue Victoria (BSAR) is a volunteer search and rescue group active in the state of Victoria (Australia) and is affiliated with Bushwalking Victoria. Bush Search and Rescue participates in land-based search and rescue activities for persons lost in the bush, in conjunction with and under direction from the Victoria Police Search and Rescue Squad.

Members are selected by bushwalking, mountaineering and outdoors clubs affiliated to Bushwalking Victoria. From 2007, members could also be selected from individual members of Bushwalking Victoria.

Bush Search and Rescue has provided volunteer search and rescue services to the people of Victoria on over 100 occasions, usually in bush or alpine areas. BSAR volunteers are often asked to participate in searches at short notice, in adverse weather conditions and in rough and extreme terrain. BSAR has the ability to send out small self-sufficient search groups which can navigate accurately without landmarks and stay out overnight.

== History ==
Bush Search and Rescue was formed in 1949 after several volunteer bushwalkers were involved in an extended search at Wilsons Promontory.

Until the 90s, the organisation was known as the "Federation of Victorian Walking Clubs Search and Rescue Section", often abbreviated to "The Federation". In the 90s, the organisation name transitioned to "Bushwalkers Search and Rescue".

In 2008, the organisation name Bush Search and Rescue Victoria was formally adopted.

Bush Search and Rescue is registered as an Emergency Service in the Emergency Management Manual Victoria.

== Notable searches ==
Some notable searches that Bush Search and Rescue has participated in include:

- Search for a solo walker at Wilsons Promontory in 1949 (not found)
- Search for 6 walkers at Paradise Plans near Marysville in 1952
- The "Snowgirl search" at Mount Donna Buang in 1953
- 10-day search for a walker at Baw Baw Plateau in 1955 (not found)
- Search for a female walker at Mt Magdala in 1961 (found dead on a cliff)
- Search for 16 missing teenagers at Mount Donna Buang in 1966. Found with frostbite.
- Search for lost schoolboys at Lake Mountain, evacuated by bush stretcher in 1972
- 12-day search for a lost child at Toorongo Falls (not found) in 1972
- Search for a large school group on Wellington Plains in snow in 1974
- Search for 2 resort skiers at Mount Hotham in 1978 (found dead)
- The Bicycle Man search in the vicinity of the Wongungurra River in 1982
- Search for a lost boy at Wilsons Promontory in 1987 (not found)
- Large scale search for Minister Tim Holding on Mount Feathertop in August 2009
- 5-day search for a missing deer hunter, at Tomahawk Creek near Mount Stirling in June 2011 (not found)
- Large scale search for lost boy in Lake Eildon National Park in April 2015
