= 2013 Lyndhurst state by-election =

State by-election in Victoria, Australia

- 27 April 2013

Electoral district of Lyndhurst in the Victorian Legislative Assembly
	First party	Second party	Third party
		FFP	DLP
Candidate	Martin Pakula	Stephen Nowland	Geraldine Gonsalvez
Party	Labor	Family First	Democratic Labour
Primary vote	12,899	4,454	3,467
Percentage	41.0%	14.1%	11.0%
Swing	▼14.5	▲9.3	▲9.8
TCP	57.0%	43.0%
TCP swing	▼6.9	▲43.0
MP before election
Tim Holding
Labor
Elected MP
Martin Pakula
Labor

A by-election for the seat of Lyndhurst in the Victorian Legislative Assembly was held on 27 April 2013. The by-election was triggered by the resignation of Labor Party (ALP) member Tim Holding on 18 February 2013. Martin Pakula retained the seat for Labor.

== Dates ==
The writ for the by-election was issued on 5 March 2013. The electoral roll in Lyndhurst closed on 12 March, and the final date for candidates to nominate was 28 March. Registration of how-to-vote cards closed on 18 April. Polling day was 27 April.

== Candidates ==
Candidates in ballot paper order for the by-election were:

Candidate nominations
Australian Sex Party	Martin Leahy	Contested Ferntree Gully for the Sex Party in 2010.
Greens	Nina Springle	Community worker. Contested Lyndhurst for the Greens in 2010.
Independent	Hung Vo	Contested Lyndhurst as an independent in 2010.
Independent	Bobby Singh	Contested Division of Holt for the Palmer United Party in 2013.
Family First Party	Stephen Nowland	School worker, registered builder.
Independent	David Linaker	Lost VCAT case to appear on the electoral roll as David Linaker-Liberal. Contested 2012 Niddrie by-election as an independent.
Labor Party	Martin Pakula	Lawyer and previously an industrial officer, state secretary, and national vice-president of the NUW. Labor member of the Victorian Legislative Council seat of Western Metropolitan Region from 2006 to 2013.
Democratic Labour Party	Geraldine Gonsalvez	Dandenong councillor from 2000 to 2003. Contested Victorian Legislative Council seat of South Eastern Metropolitan Region for the DLP in 2006 and 2010 and was on the Victorian DLP Senate ticket in 2010.

The Liberal Party declined to nominate a candidate for the by-election.

== How-to-vote cards ==
How-to-vote cards are distributed to voters at polling stations to provide information about how the candidate suggests preferences be allocated. Candidates and parties suggesting preferences are shown in each column of the table below. The Sex Party released a card with two preferences allocated, one favoring Labor and the other favoring the Greens. The Greens ran an open card at this by-election.

	Sex		Greens	Vo	Singh	Family First	Linaker	Labor	DLP
Sex	1	1		8	5	7	7	3	7
Greens	3	2	1	6	7	8	8	4	8
Vo	4	4		1	4	3	2	5	3
Singh	5	5		7	1	5	5	6	4
Family First	7	7		3	2	1	3	7	2
Linaker	6	6		2	8	4	1	8	5
Labor	2	3		5	6	6	6	1	6
DLP	8	8		4	3	2	4	2	1

== Results ==
Lyndhurst state by-election, 2013
Party	Candidate	Votes	%	±%
Labor	Martin Pakula	12,899	41.0	–14.5
Family First	Stephen Nowland	4,454	14.1	+9.3
Democratic Labour	Geraldine Gonsalvez	3,467	11.0	+9.8
Independent	Hung Vo	3,070	9.7	+6.2
Greens	Nina Springle	2,960	9.4	+3.3
Sex Party	Martin Leahy	2,635	8.4	+8.4
Independent	David Linaker	1,370	4.4	+4.4
Independent	Bobby Singh	639	2.0	+2.0
Total formal votes		31,494	90.5	–2.4
Informal votes		3,288	9.5	+2.4
Turnout		34,782	80.1	−12.4
Two-candidate-preferred result
Labor	Martin Pakula	17,961	57.0	–6.9
Family First	Stephen Nowland	13,533	43.0	+43.0
Labor hold		Swing	N/A	

The results are final. Pre-poll and postal votes were included on election night upon which media outlets called the by-election for Labor. The full preference distribution occurred on 1 May.

== See also ==
- List of Victorian state by-elections
