= Mount Dom Dom =

Mountain in Victoria, Australia

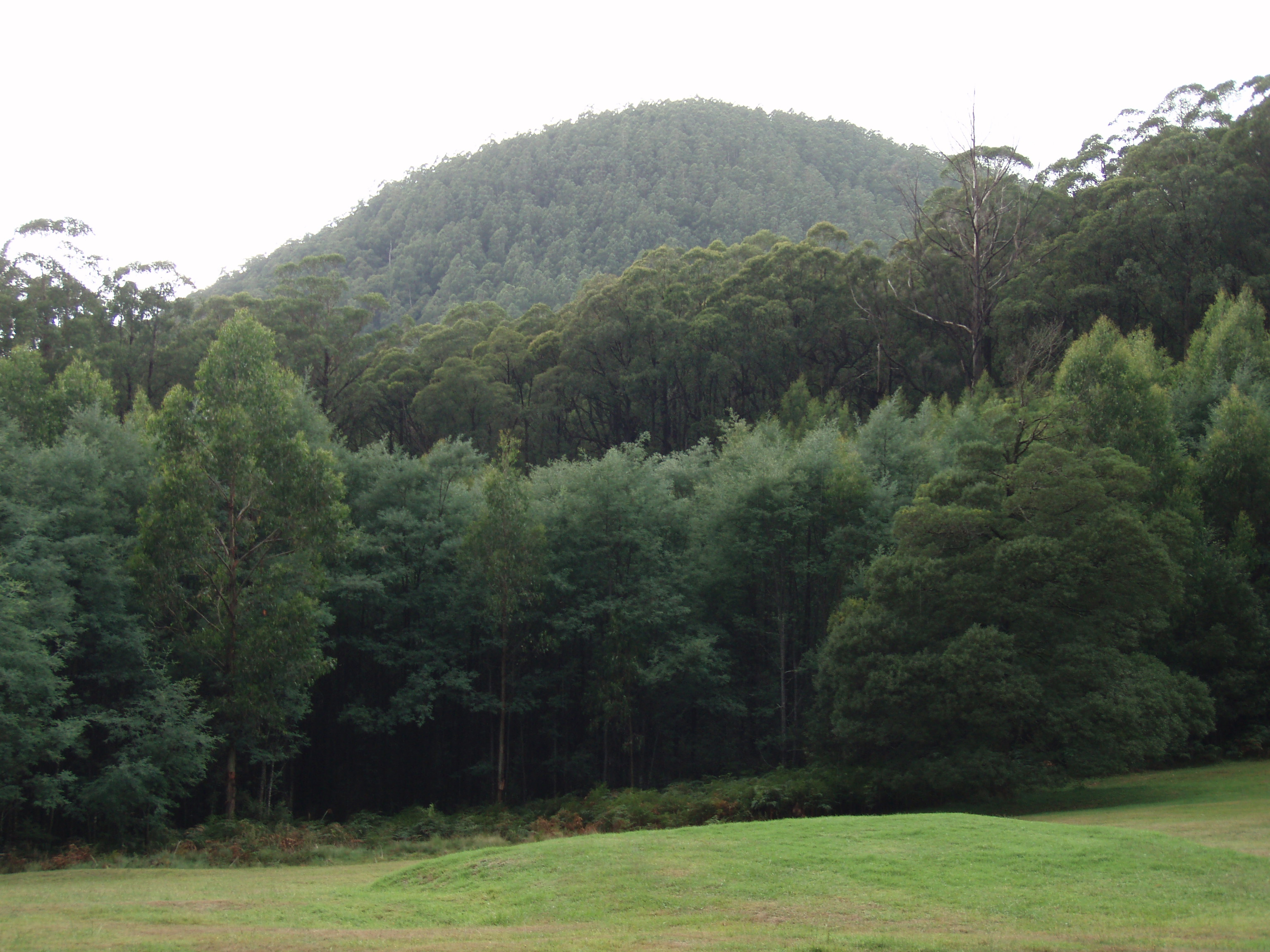
- The summit of Mount Dom Dom viewed from Dom Dom saddle

Highest point
- Elevation: 740 m (2,430 ft)
- Coordinates: 37°35′S 145°40′E

Geography
- Location within Victoria
- Location: Victoria, Australia
- Parent range: Great Dividing Range

Climbing
- First ascent: Unknown
- Easiest route: Hike up from Dom Dom saddle

Mount Dom Dom is a mountain in Victoria, Australia 65 km from Melbourne.

Mount Dom Dom was the site of a plane crash involving a Cessna 210 aircraft on 18 June 1974 during stormy weather.

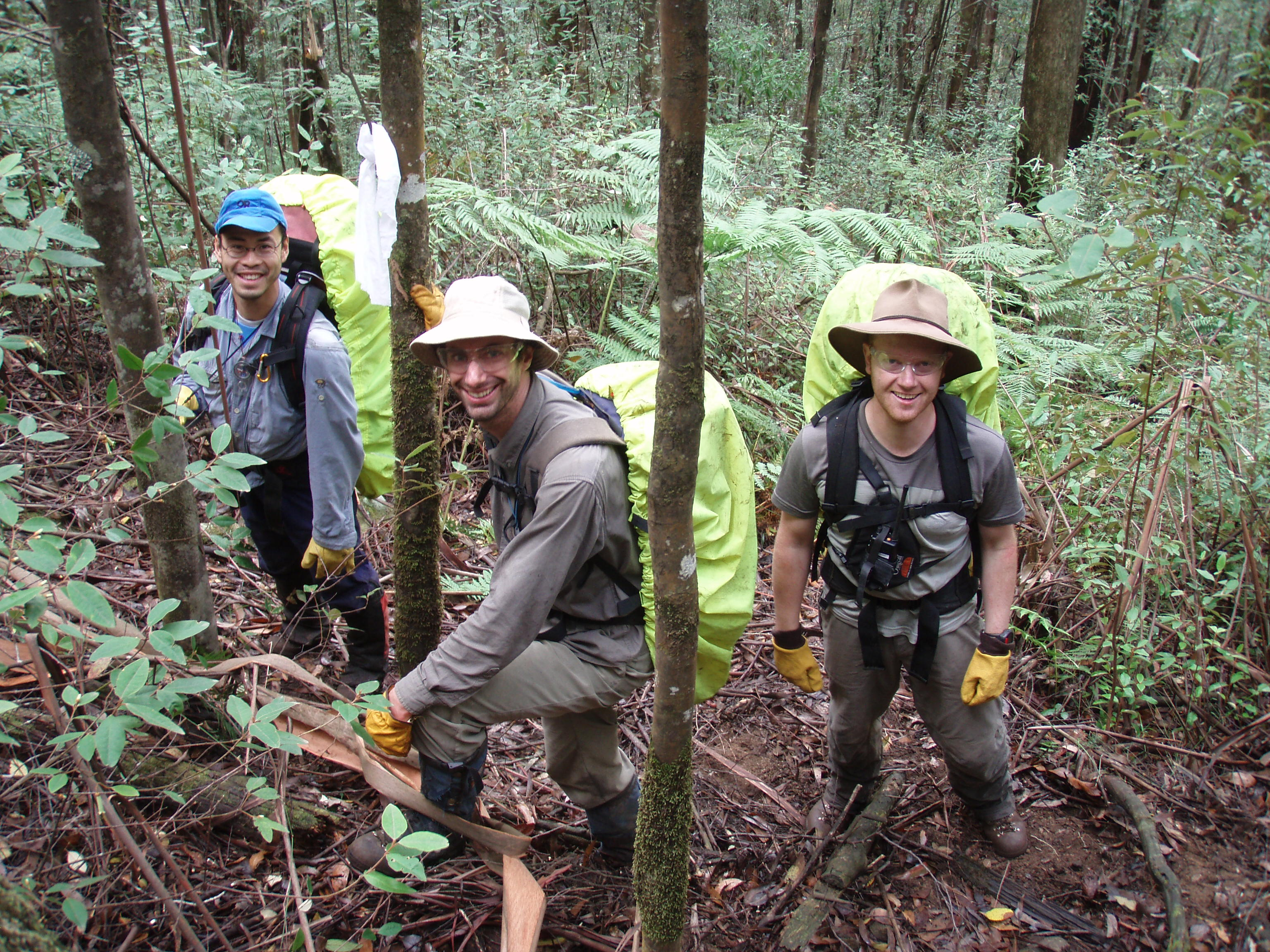
BSAR searchers at Mount Dom Dom

An extensive search was conducted by Victoria police, emergency services (including the SES and CFA) and volunteers (including BSAR) on and around Mount Dom Dom over five days for a hiker who went missing on Sunday 23 March 2008.

The summit of Mount Dom Dom is most easily accessed by following the Dom Dom Road (a vehicle track) from Dom Dom saddle then ascending an ill-defined walking track north from the Dom Dom Road to the summit.

== See also ==
- Alpine National Park
- List of mountains in Australia § Victoria
- List of reduplicated Australian place names
