= Electoral district of Keysborough =

Former state electoral district of Victoria, Australia

Coordinates: 37.99°S 145.15°E

Keysborough Victoria—Legislative Assembly
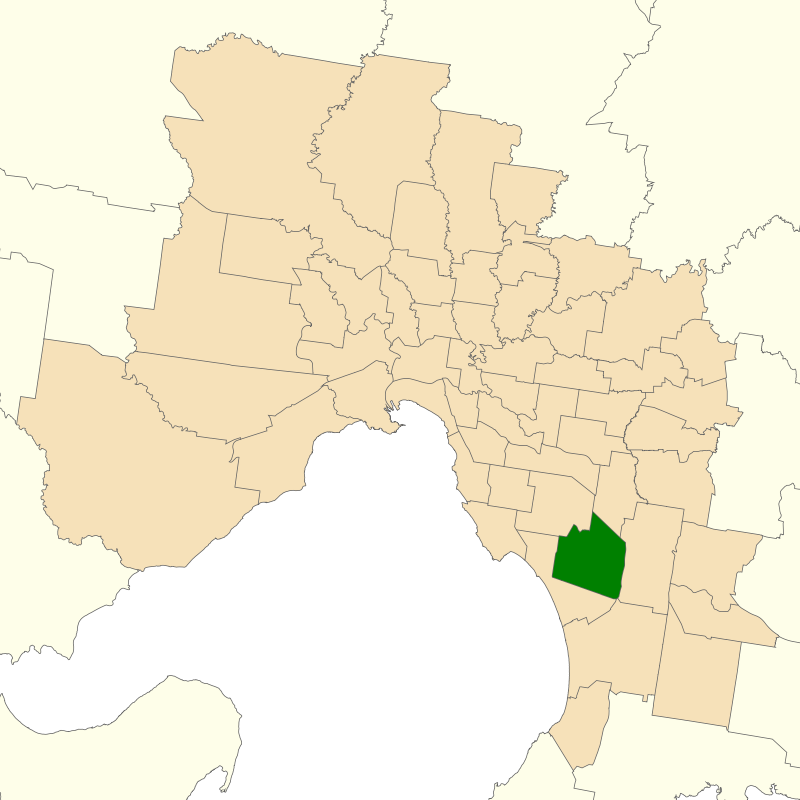
- Location of Keysborough (dark green) in Greater Melbourne
- State: Victoria
- Created: 2014
- Abolished: 2022
- MP: Martin Pakula
- Party: Labor
- Electors: 45,327 (2018)
- Area: 47 km^{2} (18.1 sq mi)
- Demographic: Metropolitan

The electoral district of Keysborough was an electoral district of the Victorian Legislative Assembly in Australia. It was created in the redistribution of electoral boundaries in 2013, and came into effect at the 2014 state election.

It largely covered the area of the former district of Lyndhurst, covering southeast suburbs of Melbourne. It included the suburbs of Springvale South, Noble Park, Keysborough, and Dingley Village.

The seat of Keysborough was only ever held by Labor MP Martin Pakula during its existence.

The seat was abolished by the Electoral Boundaries Commission ahead of the 2022 election and predominantly split into the electoral districts of Clarinda, Dandenong and Mordialloc.

== Members ==
Member	Party	Term
Martin Pakula	Labor	2014–2022

== Election results ==
2018 Victorian state election: Keysborough
Party	Candidate	Votes	%	±%
Labor	Martin Pakula	20,800	54.61	+1.56
Liberal	Darrel Taylor	10,919	28.67	−3.17
Independent	Hung Vo	2,401	6.30	+0.91
Greens	Ken McAlpine	1,882	4.94	−0.79
Animal Justice	Helen Jeges	1,407	3.69	+3.69
Transport Matters	Usman Mohammed Afzal	680	1.79	+1.79
Total formal votes		38,089	93.26	−0.68
Informal votes		2,752	6.74	+0.68
Turnout		40,841	90.10	−3.07
Two-party-preferred result
Labor	Martin Pakula	24,725	64.85	+2.95
Liberal	Darrel Taylor	13,399	35.15	−2.95
Labor hold		Swing	+2.95	
