= Victoria Police Search and Rescue Squad =

Search and Rescue Squad
- Active: 1957–present
- Country: Australia
- Agency: Victoria Police
- Type: Search and Rescue
- Part of: Specialist Response Division
- Headquarters: Williamstown
- Abbreviation: SAR

Structure
- Sworn officers: 21

Commanders
- Current commander: Inspector Greg Barras
- Notable commanders: Inspector Paul Carr; Inspector William (Bill) Brand

The Search and Rescue Squad is the Search and Rescue unit of Victoria Police and provides specialist expertise, advice and practical assistance in land search and rescue. This expertise covers most terrains including snow and vertical cliff search and rescue.

== History ==
The Search and Rescue Squad was formed in 1957 after several unsuccessful searches for missing persons in remote areas of Victoria. Initially the squad consisted of five men with considerable bush experience, who controlled and coordinated bush searches. When not engaged in searches these members performed general police duties.

In 1958 members were trained in diving by the Royal Australian Navy, and from this time onward the squad became responsible for underwater searches. These searches included the search and recovery of deceased persons, stolen property, weapons, court evidence, motor vehicles and other objects. The squad became fully operational in 1962 in response to the increasing demand for its services.

== Search operations ==
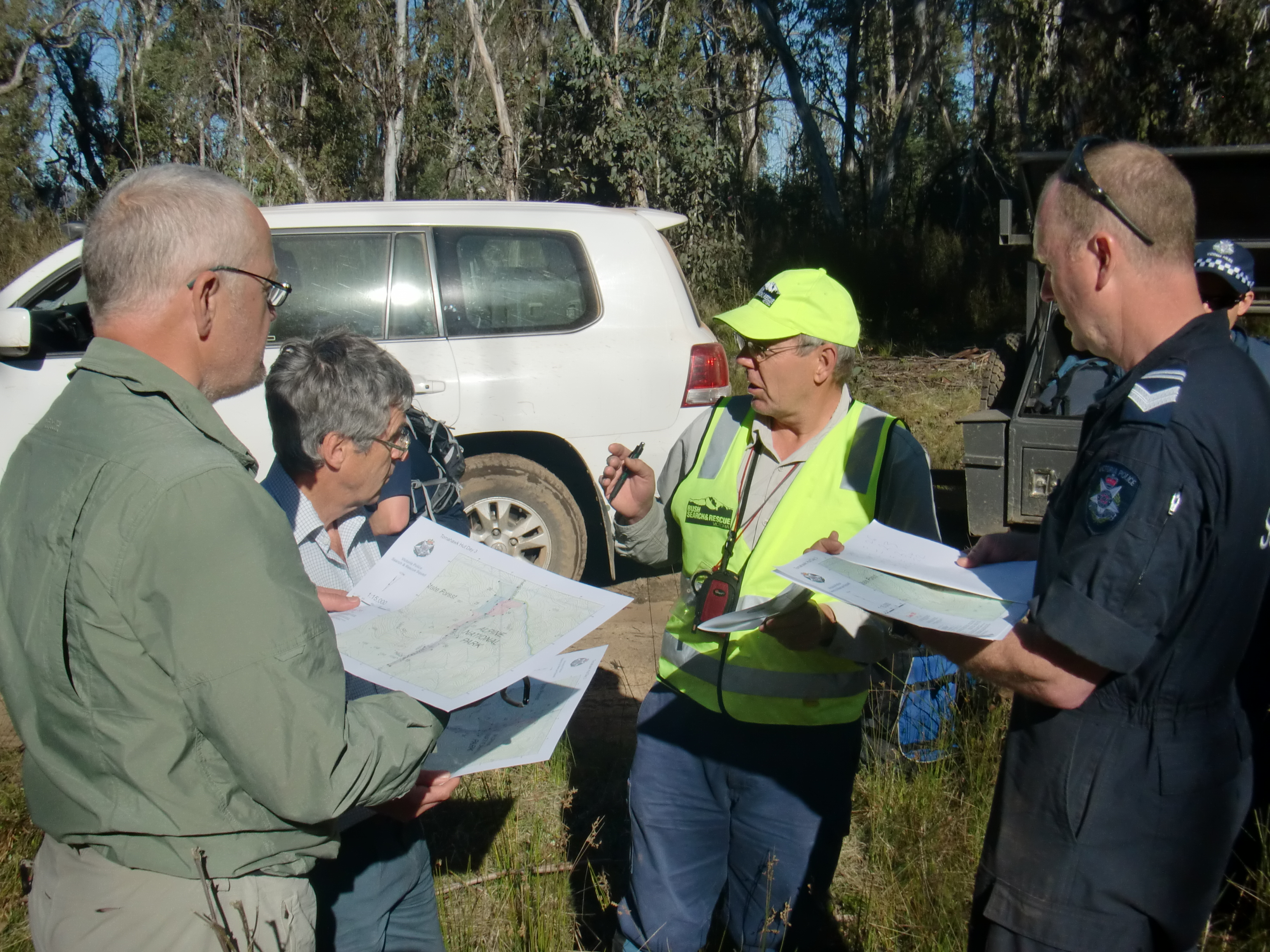
BSAR searchers being briefed by Victoria Police SAR

The squad's duties include:

- underwater diving
- bush search and rescue
- snow search and rescue
- mountaineering
- navigation
- cliff rescue and airborne operations.
- searching ship hulls for drugs
- investigating diving fatalities
- retrieving submerged cars, exhibits or bodies from rivers and lakes.

== Rescue operations ==
The Search and Rescue Squad provide assistance in land, snow and vertical cliff search and rescue. The Rescue Coordination Centre provides the squad with information on the location and assistance required. It is the squad's responsibility to provide the necessary equipment depending on whether it is a land, water, snow or vertical cliff rescue.

== Operational support ==
The Search and Rescue Squad sometimes works with other Emergency Response Division Squads, such as the Air Wing to assist in searching and transporting members to isolated locations. The squad also coordinates the activities of specialist volunteer groups such as Bush Search and Rescue Victoria and the State Emergency Service in the field.

== Demonstrations and protests ==
During planned lengthy or potentially violent public demonstrations, Search and Rescue can be deployed to remove large or solid objects that have been positioned to obstruct operational police members. Search and Rescue has also assisted in the removal of forest demonstrators who have positioned themselves in trees or attached themselves to tree-removing equipment.

== Training support for operational members ==
Search and Rescue assists local operational police by providing advice and formal training in bush craft, map reading and navigation.

== Equipment ==
The Search and Rescue Squad has a large range of specialist equipment including:

- Dive operations vehicle, fitted with equipment to cover most operational situations
- Four wheel drive vehicles that carry a full complement of recovery equipment including first-aid kits, winches, axes, chain slings and snatch blocks and chains
- Two over-snow vehicles
- Two boats
- Communications equipment
- Cliff rescue and climbing equipment
- Bushwalking equipment
- Snow and ice climbing equipment
- Skimobiles
- Jetskis

=== Diving equipment ===
The squad uses twin-cylinder diving units for most diving operations. A high-pressure compressor is also carried on the dive truck and to other long-term dive sites.

A 'personal issue' wetsuit protects each diver from injury and retains enough warmth to withstand even the coldest water. An inflatable 'Fenzy' assists ascent to the surface through a compressed air cylinder, which automatically inflates the vest. Standard diving accessories include swim fins, facemask, diving knives, weight belt and a lifeline between the diver and the on-land attendant.

== See also ==
- Victoria Police
- Search and rescue
