= Carole Marple =

Australian politician

Carole Frances Marple (née Whitelaw) (24 December 1941 – 31 January 2025) was an Australian politician. She was the Labor member for Altona in the Victorian Legislative Assembly from 1992 to 1996.

Carole Frances Whitelaw was born at Benalla, north-east of Melbourne, daughter of farmer and racehorse trainer John Lindsay ('Jack') Whitelaw and Grace (née Cartwright). She was educated at Brighton, becoming a primary teacher specialising in helping children with learning difficulties. A member of the Australian Labor Party, she ran as a candidate for several federal elections, contesting the safe Coalition seat of Indi in 1980 and 1983 and running in the unwinnable fourth position on the Victorian Labor Senate ticket in 1984 and 1990. From 1987–90 she was chairperson of the party's Rural Policy Committee, and chairperson of the Conservation Policy Committee 1986–92. She was a member of the Noxious Weeds Board and was instrumental in the development of Landcare.

In 1992, Marple was elected to the Victorian Legislative Assembly as the Labor member for Altona. She was Shadow Minister for Natural Resources (1992–93) and Agriculture and Rural Affairs (1993–96). In 1996 she was defeated for preselection by Lynne Kosky of the party's Socialist Left faction. Marple was aligned with the Pledge/Labor Left faction of the Party and fell foul of the post-1992 agreement between the Socialist Left and Labor Unity factions. She then won preselection for the Legislative Council seat of Geelong, but was defeated.

With her husband, Godfrey Marple (1941-2020), who worked in the wool industry, she had two children.

Victorian Legislative Assembly
Preceded by New seat	Member for Altona; 1992–1996	Succeeded by Lynne Kosky
