= 2010 Altona state by-election =

A by-election was held for the Victorian Legislative Assembly seat of Altona on 13 February 2010, following the sudden resignation of state Transport Minister Lynne Kosky on 18 January, who cited a family member's health as the reason for her decision to leave politics. Altona was widely considered a safe Labor seat, with Kosky winning over 60% of the primary vote at the 2006 state election.

The Labor Party's Jill Hennessy, a lawyer who sat on the board of Western Health, won the seat despite a 13 percent primary vote swing away from Labor. The Liberals and Greens primary votes went up by 11 percent and 2 percent respectively. Hennessy retained the seat in the November 2010 state election.

== Candidates ==
The following candidates nominated; they are listed in ballot-paper order.

- Independent – Brijender Nain.
- Independent – Liz Mumby.
- Socialist Alliance – Margarita Windisch.
- Liberal Party – Mark Rose, a Wyndham councillor and candidate for Tarneit in the 2006 state election.
- Greens – David Strangward, a management consultant.
- Independent – Andrew Rixon.
- Independent – Brian Shaw.
- Labor Party – Jill Hennessy, a lawyer who sat on the board of Western Health, and was backed in her preselection bid by Steve Bracks, Joan Kirner, Lynne Kosky and Nicola Roxon. She defeated Hobsons Bay councillor Luba Grigorovitch for Labor endorsement.

== Election results ==
Altona state by-election, 2010
Party	Candidate	Votes	%	±%
Labor	Jill Hennessy	18,249	47.50	−13.11
Liberal	Mark Rose	13,427	34.95	+11.06
Greens	David Strangward	4,006	10.43	+2.01
Independent	Liz Mumby	693	1.80	+1.80
Independent	Brijender Nain	634	1.65	+1.65
Independent	Brian Shaw	623	1.62	+1.62
Socialist Alliance	Margarita Windisch	607	1.58	+1.58
Independent	Andrew Rixon	182	0.47	+0.47
Total formal votes		38,421	95.18	+1.29
Informal votes		1,947	4.82	−1.29
Turnout		40,368	93.69	−9.03
Two-party-preferred result
Labor	Jill Hennessy	22,252	57.93	−12.28
Liberal	Mark Rose	16,160	42.07	+12.28
Labor hold		Swing	−12.28	
