= Anne Eckstein =

Australian politician

Anne Lore Eckstein (born 28 September 1955) is an Australian former politician.

Born in Ferntree Gully, Victoria, she graduated from Boronia High School in 1973 and received a Bachelor of Arts (Hons) in 1978 and a Master of Arts in 1985 from Monash University. In 1979 she received her Diploma of Education and became a primary school teacher. She also held a number of positions with the Department of Education and Training.

She was the Labor candidate for the new, fairly-safe Liberal seat of Ferntree Gully in the 2002 Victorian state election, and won it on the back of the Labor landslide. She was defeated in 2006 by Liberal candidate Nick Wakeling by a margin of 27 votes.

Parliament of Victoria
Preceded by New seat	Member for Ferntree Gully; 2002–2006	Succeeded by Nick Wakeling
