= Nick Wakeling =

Australian politician (born 1971)

The Honourable Nick Wakeling MP

Minister for Higher Education and Skills
- In office 17 March 2014 – 4 December 2014
- Preceded by: Peter Hall
- Succeeded by: Steve Herbert (as Minister for Training and Skills)

Member of the Victorian Legislative Assembly for Ferntree Gully
- In office 25 November 2006 – 26 November 2022
- Preceded by: Anne Eckstein
- Succeeded by: Seat abolished

Personal details
- Born: 6 May 1971 (age 54) St Leonards, New South Wales
- Party: Liberal Party
- Website: nickwakeling.org.au

Nicholas Wakeling (born 6 May 1971) is an Australian former politician. He was a Liberal Party member of the Victorian Legislative Assembly, representing the electorate of Ferntree Gully from 2006 until his defeat at the 2022 Victorian state election.

== Early life ==
Wakeling was born at St Leonards, New South Wales, the eldest of two sons to Bill and Jacqueline Wakeling.

Moving to Melbourne as a child, Wakeling attended Rosewood Downs Primary School and completed his VCE at Haileybury College, Melbourne.

Wakeling completed a Bachelor of Arts from La Trobe University, a Graduate Diploma in Industrial Relations/Human Resource Management from RMIT and a master's degree in Industrial and Employee Relations from Monash University.

== Professional career ==
Prior to his entry to Parliament, Wakeling worked as an industrial advisor with the Victorian government's Wageline Department; as an industrial officer with the Victorian Automobile Chamber of Commerce (VACC); as a human resource advisor at Nillumbik Shire Council and as a senior workplace relations advisor for Adecco.

== Political career ==
Wakeling joined the Liberal Party in 1989. Since joining, Wakeling has been an active member of the La Trobe University Liberal Club, the Noble Park Young Liberals (Australia) and Rowville Senior Party Branch.

Wakeling was a councillor at Knox City Council from 2003 to 2005.

In July 2005, Wakeling was preselected as the Liberal candidate for the electoral district of Ferntree Gully. At the November 2006 Victorian state election, Wakeling defeated the incumbent ALP member, Anne Eckstein, by 27 votes.

In 2008, Wakeling was promoted to Parliamentary Secretary to the Leader of the Opposition.

At the 2010 state election, Wakeling recorded a swing of almost 12% to take the electorate from the Liberal Party's most marginal to safe seat status.

From 2010 to 2014, Wakeling served as Parliamentary Secretary for Health. He was appointed Minister for Higher Education and Skills in March 2014, serving until the defeat of the Coalition government at the 2014 state election.

Wakeling supported Matthew Guy's successful 2021 bid to replace Michael O’Brien as Leader of the Opposition. As of late 2021, Wakeling is the Shadow Minister for Industrial Relations and Trade.

Prior to Matthew Guy's directive to Liberal Party MPs that they were not to address protestors opposing health measures in Victoria, Wakeling was criticised for being one of a number of Liberal Party MPs who attended one of these rallies, which featured a number violent threats against the Premier from members of ‘fringe’ protest groups.

Wakeling was defeated at the 2022 Victorian state election by Labor's Jackson Taylor.

Victorian Legislative Assembly
Preceded by Anne Eckstein	Member for Ferntree Gully; 2006–2022	Abolished
