= Lynne Kosky =

Australian politician

The Honourable Lynne Kosky
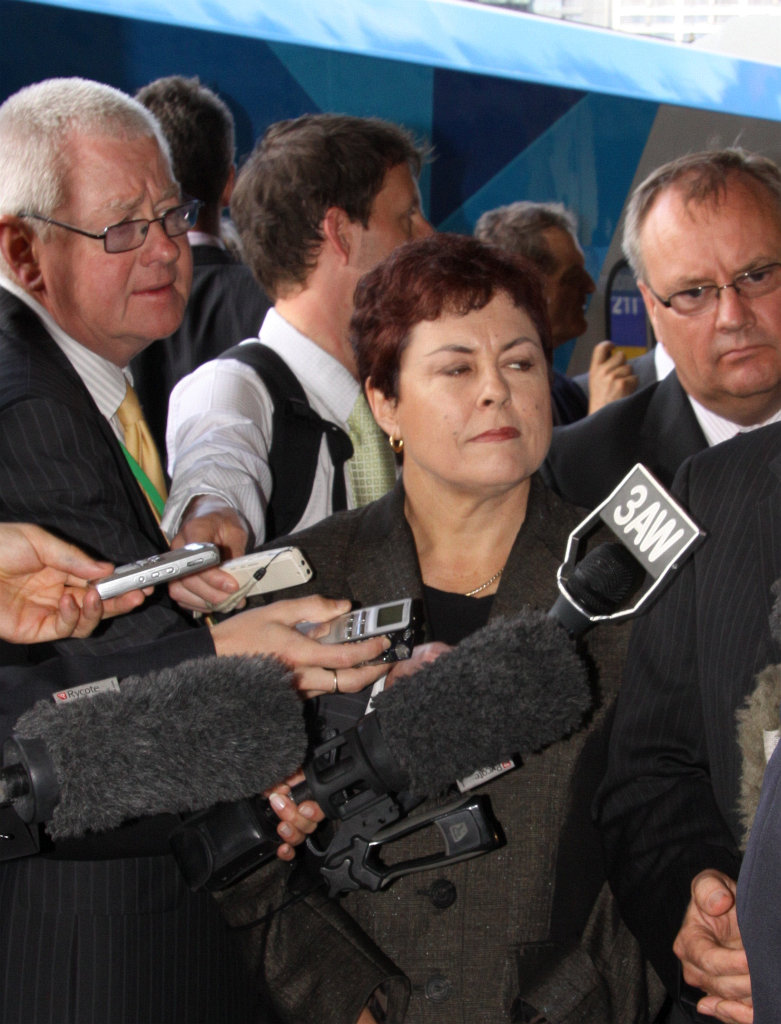
- Lynne Kosky in 2009 in her role as Minister for Public Transport

Member of the Victorian Legislative Assembly for Altona
- In office 30 March 1996 – 18 January 2010
- Preceded by: Carole Marple
- Succeeded by: Jill Hennessy

Personal details
- Born: Lynne Janice Kosky; 2 September 1958 Melbourne, Australia
- Died: 4 December 2014 (aged 56) Melbourne, Victoria, Australia
- Party: Labor Party
- Spouse: Jim Williamson
- Education: University of Melbourne
- Occupation: Social worker

Lynne Janice Kosky (2 September 1958 – 4 December 2014) was an Australian politician and senior minister in the Government of Victoria. She represented the electoral district of Altona in the Victorian Legislative Assembly for the Labor Party from 1996 to 2010 and held key ministerial posts from 1999 through to her retirement from politics, including the key education and public transport portfolios.

A sometimes controversial figure, particularly as public transport minister, and a magnet for criticism about the performance of Melbourne's metropolitan rail system, Kosky presided over the largest increases to public transport patronage in Victoria for 50 years, although a substantial infrastructure deficit had been created over that period due to a bias towards funding for roads. Kosky attracted record funding for public transport, particularly during the settling of the Victorian Transport Plan, and built a strong record of legislative reform in her ministerial posts. On 18 January 2010, Kosky announced her resignation from Parliament, effective immediately, citing "significant health problems in her family".

== Before politics ==
Born in Melbourne with a twin brother Mark, Kosky was educated at Footscray High School, and graduated from the University of Melbourne in 1980 with a Bachelor of Social Work. In her final year of studies, she had a placement at Sunshine High School, where she met her future husband, teacher Jim Williamson. After a few months of unemployment, Kosky secured a job as a social worker at the Victorian Department of Education, but finding she was not suited to counselling, became a community education officer.

Contact with Joan Kirner, a female parliamentarian, inspired Kosky to join the Labor Party in 1985, and work as a government policy advisor and a year later she was elected to the City of Footscray council, becoming Mayor in 1988. She was also a member of the Board of the Footscray Football Club (now known as the Western Bulldogs), where she became Number 1 Woman Ticketholder. In 1993, while pregnant with her first child Hana, Kosky ran for the preselection for the State Parliamentary seat of Altona, a safe Labor seat in Melbourne's western suburbs. She was defeated by Carole Marple, but was preselected and elected in 1996.

== Parliamentary career ==
With the ALP in opposition during her early years as an MP, Kosky believed she would get the prized education portfolio in a February 1999 shadow cabinet reshuffle, but ALP leader John Brumby awarded it to Mary Delahunty instead, with Kosky assigned to the junior education role of employment, tertiary education and training. When the ALP, now led by Steve Bracks, defeated Jeff Kennett's Liberal government in the 1999 state election, Kosky was awarded the equivalent ministry as [[Minister for Post Compulsory Education, Training and Employment]]. She also took on the Finance portfolio in 2000, and was a member of the Cabinet Expenditure Review Committee responsible for budget oversight.

=== Minister for Education and Training ===
Kosky was appointed Minister for Education and Training in February 2002, and shortly afterward implemented what she considers one of her greatest achievements: the introduction of the Victorian Certificate of Applied Learning (VCAL), a "hands-on" alternative to the Victorian Certificate of Education.

Kosky outlined her general approach to education in a speech in February 2006:

"Of all the factors that have the potential to increase an individual's opportunities, education and training is the most enabling. It allows individuals to equip themselves to live fulfilling, productive and satisfying lives. It provides the opportunity for them to consider their place in our democratic Australian communities and to acknowledge their cultural and linguistic heritage. Not only does education provide the grounding for the development of skills and judgment, it supports people to be innovative and creative. Education and training enables individuals to contribute to Australian society by adding to our national prosperity, participating in our democratic processes and strengthening the cohesive and egalitarian nature of our communities. It is a private good that has immense public value.

The successful provision of quality education and training for all is the critical requirement of all modern democracies to enable their citizens to flourish personally and to maximise economic, social and cultural opportunity. A quality education and training system does not respond only to contemporary needs and issues; it should also identify and anticipate future needs and challenges. It is a fundamental community and social glue, while being a bridge to a more prosperous and harmonious future."

==== Legislative reform ====
Kosky led an extensive legislative review during her period as Minister for Education and Training and released a discussion paper on 11 February 2005 on a review of 15 separate statutes governing Victoria's education and training system. She commented that:

"Victoria’s Education Act was first enacted in 1873. While it was reviewed in 1958, there has never been a fundamental revision of the Act that provides the regulation of all schooling in Victoria,"

"This is an historic opportunity for a public consultation process on education and training legislation. What was relevant 130 years ago, or even 50 years ago, is not always going to be relevant today. For example, our laws do not reflect currents trends, such as the raising of the minimum school-leaving age, which is higher than 15 in most other OECD countries.

"We need to ensure our education legislation meets the needs and expectations of a community in the 21st century. Today the system has broader subject choice, greater autonomy for schools and teachers, increased focus on skills and employment outcomes and different demands on teachers and trainers."

The review would also examine the seven statutory authorities in the portfolio, to identify any areas of overlap or duplication."

==== Education and Training Reform Bill ====
Kosky's review of education legislation led to the introduction of the Education and Training Reform Bill in February 2006, the most far reaching statutory changes in the field for a century. She made the following observations in her speech to Parliament:

"...many of the provisions in the current 1958 Education Act remained unchanged from 1872. As a consequence the most significant changes included in this reform Bill relate to school education where current legislation prescribes in minute and often archaic detail the operation of a government school over a century ago. In developing this reform Bill we have consulted widely with education and training stakeholders and the broader community over the past year.

Informed by the views expressed and our own policy research, this Bill represents the aspirations and expectations of the community for an education and training system set in the 21st century in the following ways:

- it includes, for the first time in education and training legislation, a set of overarching principles that reflect the democratic values that are the essence of our society and system of government;
- it provides for a seamless education and training system in Victoria that supports high standards and provides multiple pathways and lifelong learning opportunities;
- it replaces 12 Acts with one consolidated Education and Training Reform Act; and
- it provides reforms that will support flexible and responsive service delivery across Victoria."

=== Rumours about promotion to Deputy Premier ===
Following the return of the Bracks government in the 2006 election, it was rumoured among the Victorian ALP factions that Kosky would be promoted to Deputy Premier. Steve Bracks denied the rumour, saying his deputy would continue to be John Thwaites. Instead, Kosky was appointed Minister for Public Transport and the Arts.

=== Minister for Public Transport and the Arts ===
Kosky came under fire in April 2007 when an email was leaked to the media in which she asked her parliamentary colleagues not to forward on complaints from their constituents about Melbourne's public transport system. She defended the correspondence on ABC Radio, denying she was shirking responsibility as the public transport minister, and that the directive had been intended to hasten communication and reduce response times for transport complaints.

In December 2007, she defended the delayed implementation of the myki smartcard ticketing system for Victoria's public transport, stating it was a complicated system and it was "important to get it right".

==== Victorian Transport Plan ====
In 2008, Kosky played a key role in the development of the Victorian Transport Plan and secured the most extensive funding for transport in Victoria for many years. The Plan involved more than $38 billion in projects including:

- New trains and new tracks – an investment of more than $2.6 billion (completed)
- More trams and buses – $1.5 billion for 50 new low-floor trams and up to 270 new low-floor buses (completed)
- Regional Rail Link – more than $4 billion for a new track from West Werribee to Southern Cross Station (completed)
- Melbourne Metro Rail Project – a new rail tunnel between the city's west and east, costing more than $4.5 billion (completed)
- Better regional roads (completed)
- An alternative to the West Gate Bridge – more than $2.5 billion to build the east–west road connection as a new tunnel under the Maribyrnong River
- Shaping Victoria – $60 million to bring jobs and housing together
- Truck Action Plan – $380 million to remove trucks from residential streets in the inner west
- Completing the missing link in Melbourne's ring road – more than $6 billion for the North East Link between the Metropolitan Ring Road to the Eastern Freeway
- Peninsula Link – $750 million to link EastLink and the Mornington Peninsula Freeway (completed)
- Regional Rail – $600 million to return trains to Maryborough and for up to 74 new V/Line carriages
- Extension of the Metro Electrified Rail Network to South Morang, Sunbury, Melton and Cranbourne East to provide more transport choice in growth areas (completed)
- Removal of a major level crossing at Springvale Road, Nunawading (completed)

==== Bus Safety Bill ====
In December 2008, Kosky introduced the Bus Safety Bill to increase the safety of Victoria's bus industry. She stated:

This Bill provides a new 'best practice' safety regulation regime for Victoria's growing bus industry. It is a major step in the modernisation of transport safety regulation that began with the Rail Safety Act 2006 and will be completed with the forthcoming review of marine safety regulation. It is also a critical component of the government's wider program of transport legislation reform, which represents the most extensive overhaul of Victoria's transport legislation in 25 years.

Foreshadowed earlier this year in the Premier's Annual Statement of Government Intentions, the introduction of this Bill is timely, as it coincides with the largest expansion of the bus network in decades and significant patronage growth on both metropolitan and regional buses.

The Bill is by no means a response to failure in the safety performance of Victoria's bus sector – the industry in fact compares well with Australian and international trends. But serious incidents, while rare, do occur. Members might recall the dreadful 1989 Kempsey bus crash when two full tourist coaches, each travelling at 100 km/h, collided head-on near Kempsey, New South Wales, claiming 35 lives and injuring 41 others. Closer to home, in July this year, 17 people were injured in a collision between a bus and a truck in Traralgon.

We must do all we can to avoid these sorts of tragedies and this Bill aims to ensure that the bus industry's good safety record in this state is maintained and improved into the future."

==== Criticism of performance ====
In January 2009, Kosky was heavily criticised for her performance as the Minister for Public Transport. There were calls from the public and the opposition for Kosky to resign after hundreds of cancellations happened in peak hour during a heat wave. Kosky and the Labor Party rejected the calls for her resignation and acting Premier, Rob Hulls, said that Kosky had been doing a good job. A Herald Sun poll found that 88% of readers thought she should be sacked. The Age newspaper has stated that their position is that she should be sacked in an editorial subtitled, "Lynne Kosky has failed commuters so badly that her position has become untenable."

==== Transport Integration Bill ====
Kosky introduced the Transport Integration Bill into the Victorian Parliament on 10 December 2009 after leading the State's Transport Legislation Review. The Bill represented a new direction in transport policy and practice and the most significant statutory change in the area for over 25 years. The introduction of the Bill followed the release of an issues paper and a discussion paper and public consultation throughout Victoria. Kosky observed in introducing the Bill that:

"...the Bill charts the government's new direction in transport policy and delivery, providing a framework for integrated thinking on the best ways to move people and goods across the State. Contemporary transport policy recognises that our transport system should be conceived and planned as a single system performing multiple tasks. It also recognises that our transport system should be planned and delivered in a way that considers the broader social, economic and environmental impacts both now and in the future."

"This means an integrated and sustainable transport system:

- a system in which each and every transport activity – public transport on road and rail, commercial road and rail transport, private motor vehicles, commercial and recreational water
- transport, walking and cycling – works together as part of an integrated whole;
- a system that complements, and is complemented by, integrated land-use planning and decision making;
- a system that is sustainable – in economic terms, in social terms, and in environmental terms;
- a system that delivers robust economic, social and environmental benefits for the State, with an eye on national and international responsibilities and opportunities."

"For the first time, the Bill brings together all elements of the transport portfolio – those responsible for all land and water-based transport, historically segmented as roads, rail, ports and marine – under one statute. By unifying all elements of the transport portfolio, the Bill ensures that transport decisions and activities are complementary and work towards delivering the common vision. It is important to note, however, that the Bill cannot do this alone. It sits at the top of an extensive new legislative structure."

"The Transport Integration Bill provides the broad policy and agency settings, while various subject-specific statutes contain the policy and regulatory detail relating to particular transport system activities. Regulations and other subordinate instruments support each act as required. This is a comprehensive and contemporary structure that responds to the current and emerging challenges facing transport in the early 21st century, rather than the challenges that existed when the Transport Act was introduced 26 years ago."

==== Other initiatives ====
Kosky was also a reformer at micro level. She introduced a tailored compensation scheme in 2007 for train drivers traumatised by deaths on the rail system due to suicides and other causes. She also abolished an under performing graduated penalties scheme and halved fines for minors for fare evasion and misconduct offences due to the unfairness of parity with adult fines. She also introduced measures to prevent the accreditation of persons as taxi drivers if they had killed another person but had been found insane following the controversial "killer cabbie" case which dragged on through the Victorian court and tribunal system for some years.

=== Resignation ===
In January 2010, Kosky resigned from the ministry and parliament due to health problems within her family. A by-election was held in Altona on 13 February 2010 to elect her replacement, Jill Hennessy.

== Public offices held in Victoria ==
- 1986–1990 Footscray City Councillor
- 1988–1989 Mayor of City of Footscray
- 1996–1999 Federal-State Relations Committee
- 1996–2010 Parliamentary Member for Altona
- 1996–1999 Shadow Minister for Housing and Shadow Minister for Youth Affairs
- 1999 Shadow Minister for Education and Training
- 1999–2002 Minister for Post Compulsory Education, Training and Employment
- 2000–2002 Minister for Finance
- 2002–2006 Minister for Education and Training
- 2006–2010 Minister for Public Transport and Minister for the Arts

== After politics ==
Kosky was diagnosed with breast cancer in August 2011, and had been undergoing treatment when she contracted toxic shock syndrome following surgery. On 4 December 2014, Kosky died from the disease in Melbourne, aged 56.

She was posthumously inducted onto the Victorian Honour Roll of Women in 2015.

== State funeral ==
Kosky was accorded a State funeral at Williamstown Town Hall, Melbourne on 12 December 2014, which was attended by the Premier of Victoria; the official representative of the Governor of Victoria; the Federal Leader of the Opposition; former premiers; current and former ministers; and political, educational and cultural figures from across Australia. The reading was delivered by the Hon Daniel Andrews MP Premier of Victoria, and tributes were spoken by the Rev. Alan Marr, the Hon Steve Bracks AC former Premier of Victoria, Mr Peter Gordon, Mrs Di Fleming, Mr Jackson Williamson (Kosky's son) and Ms Hana Williamson (Kosky's daughter).

Victorian Legislative Assembly
Preceded by Carole Marple	Member for Altona; 1996–2010	Succeeded by Jill Hennessy
Political offices
Preceded by Mary Delahunty	Minister for Education and Training; 2002–2006	Succeeded by John Lenders
Preceded by Mary Delahunty	Minister for the Arts; 2006–2010	Succeeded by Peter Batchelor
Preceded by Peter Batchelor	Minister for Public Transport; 2006–2010	Succeeded by Martin Pakula
