= Martin Pakula =

Australian politician (born 1969)

The Honourable Martin Pakula MP

Minister for Industry Support and Recovery
- In office 22 June 2020 – 27 June 2022
- Premier: Daniel Andrews
- Preceded by: New position
- Succeeded by: Ben Carroll

Minister for Trade
- In office 22 June 2020 – 27 June 2022
- Premier: Daniel Andrews
- Preceded by: Himself
- Succeeded by: Tim Pallas

Minister for Business Precincts
- In office 22 June 2020 – 27 June 2022
- Premier: Daniel Andrews
- Preceded by: Jacinta Allan
- Succeeded by: Ben Carroll

Minister for Tourism, Sport and Major Events
- In office 29 November 2018 – 27 June 2022
- Premier: Daniel Andrews
- Preceded by: John Eren
- Succeeded by: Steve Dimopoulos

Minister for Racing
- In office 4 December 2014 – 27 June 2022
- Premier: Daniel Andrews
- Preceded by: Denis Napthine
- Succeeded by: Anthony Carbines

53rd Attorney-General of Victoria
- In office 4 December 2014 – 29 November 2018
- Premier: Daniel Andrews
- Preceded by: Robert Clark
- Succeeded by: Jill Hennessy

Member of the Victorian Legislative Assembly for Keysborough
- In office 29 November 2014 – 26 November 2022
- Preceded by: New seat
- Succeeded by: Seat abolished

Member of the Victorian Legislative Assembly for Lyndhurst
- In office 27 April 2013 – 29 November 2014
- Preceded by: Tim Holding
- Succeeded by: Seat abolished

Member of the Victorian Legislative Council for Western Metropolitan Region
- In office 25 November 2006 – 26 March 2013

Personal details
- Born: 7 January 1969 (age 57) Melbourne, Victoria, Australia
- Party: Labor
- Website: www.martinpakula.com.au

Martin Philip Pakula (born 7 January 1969) is an Australian former politician. He has been a Labor Party member of the Parliament of Victoria from 2006 to 2022: in the Legislative Council for Western Metropolitan Region from 2006 to 2013, and then in the Legislative Assembly for Lyndhurst (2013–2014) and Keysborough (2014–2022).

Pakula has served as a minister in the First Andrews Ministry and Second Andrews Ministry. Most recently until June 2022, Pakula was the Minister for Industry Support and Recovery, Minister for Trade, Minister for Business Precincts from June 2020, the Minister for Tourism, Sport & Major Events from November 2018, and the Minister for Racing from December 2014. He previously served as the Minister for Jobs, Innovation & Trade (2018–2020), Attorney-General (2014–2018). He also served as Minister for Industrial Relations (2008–2010), Minister for Industry and Trade (2008–2010) and Minister for Public Transport (2010) in the Brumby Ministry.

== Early life ==
Pakula was born in Melbourne in 1969, the son of immigrants from Poland who were deported during World War II to Uzbekistan. Pakula's mother, a school teacher, arrived in Australia as a 6 year old with no knowledge of English, while his father, a lawyer, spoke no English at home. He attended Ormond Primary School and then Haileybury. Following this, he was accepted to study economics and law at Monash University. During his time at Monash he became a leading member of Victorian Young Labor, joining the Labor Party in 1987. He completed his Bachelor of Economics in 1989 and an Honours Degree in Law in 1991. In his final year, he won the Industrial Relations Law prize.

== Professional career ==
After graduating from university, Pakula began work at Macpherson and Kelley Solicitors. In 1993, he became an Industrial Officer at the National Union of Workers. He went on to become State Secretary and National Vice President.

In 2005, Pakula unsuccessfully challenged Simon Crean in the ALP preselection for the seat of Hotham. Pakula was then preselected for ALP's third spot for the Western Metropolitan Region in the Legislative Council and was elected at the 2006 Victorian state election. Following the election, he was appointed Parliamentary Secretary for Roads and Ports under Tim Pallas.

After the resignation of Minister Theo Theophanous in December 2008, Pakula was appointed Minister for Industry and Trade and Minister for Industrial Relations. In January 2010, he replaced Lynne Kosky as Minister for Public Transport following her resignation.

On 18 March 2013 he was endorsed as the Labor candidate for the Lyndhurst by-election held on 27 April, caused by the February 2013 resignation of shadow treasurer Tim Holding. Pakula resigned from the Legislative Council on 26 March 2013 to contest Lyndhurst and was successful in retaining the seat for Labor.

On 4 December 2014 he was sworn in as the Victorian Attorney-General, and was replaced by Jill Hennessy following the 2018 Victorian state election. He continued to be a minister in a number of portfolios, with the racing portfolio being held the longest since 2014.

In June 2022, Pakula announced he would retire at the November state election. He stepped down from his ministerial roles on 27 June 2022.

In November 2022 Pakula was appointed to the board of helloworld travel as a non-executive director. Pakula was currently serving in this role as of March 2024 In January 2023 Pakula accepted a part-time role as an advisor to the Australian Football League. In October 2023 Pakula was appointed as the chair of the board of the Australian Grand Prix.

== Personal life ==
Pakula is married with two children and is a supporter of the Carlton Football Club. He lives in Black Rock. Pakula is Jewish.

Victorian Legislative Assembly
Preceded by Tim Holding	Member for Lyndhurst; 2013–2014	Abolished
New seat	Member for Keysborough; 2014–2022	Abolished
Victorian Legislative Council
Preceded by New region	Member for Western Metropolitan; 2006–2013; Served alongside: Khalil Eideh; Andrew Elsbury; Bernie Finn; Colleen Hartland; Justin Madden	Succeeded by Cesar Melhem
Political offices
Preceded by Theo Theophanous	Minister for Industry and Trade; 2008–2010	Succeeded by Jacinta Allan
Preceded by Lynne Kosky	Minister for Public Transport; 2010	Succeeded by Terry Mulder
Preceded by Robert Clark	Attorney-General of Victoria; 2014–2018	Succeeded by Jill Hennessy
Preceded by Denis Napthine	Minister for Racing; 2014–2022	Succeeded by Anthony Carbines
Preceded by Philip Dalidakis as Minister for Trade and Investment; Minister for Innovation and the Digital Economy	Minister for Jobs, Innovation and Trade; 2018–2020	Succeeded by Himself as Minister for Trade
Preceded by Philip Dalidakis as Minister for Trade and Investment; Minister for Innovation and the Digital Economy	Minister for Jobs, Innovation and Trade; 2018–2020	Succeeded by Jaala Pulford as Minister for Innovation, Medical Research and the Digital Economy
Preceded by Himself as Minister for Jobs, Innovation and Trade	Minister for Trade; 2020–2022	Succeeded by Tim Pallas
Preceded by John Eren	Minister for Tourism, Sport & Major Events; 2018–2022	Succeeded by Steve Dimopoulos
New title	Minister for Industry Support and Recovery; 2020–2022	Succeeded by Ben Carroll
Preceded by Jacinta Allan as Minister for Priority Precincts	Minister for Business Precincts; 2020–2022	Succeeded by Ben Carroll
