= Electoral district of Altona =

State electoral district of Victoria, Australia

Altona Victoria—Legislative Assembly
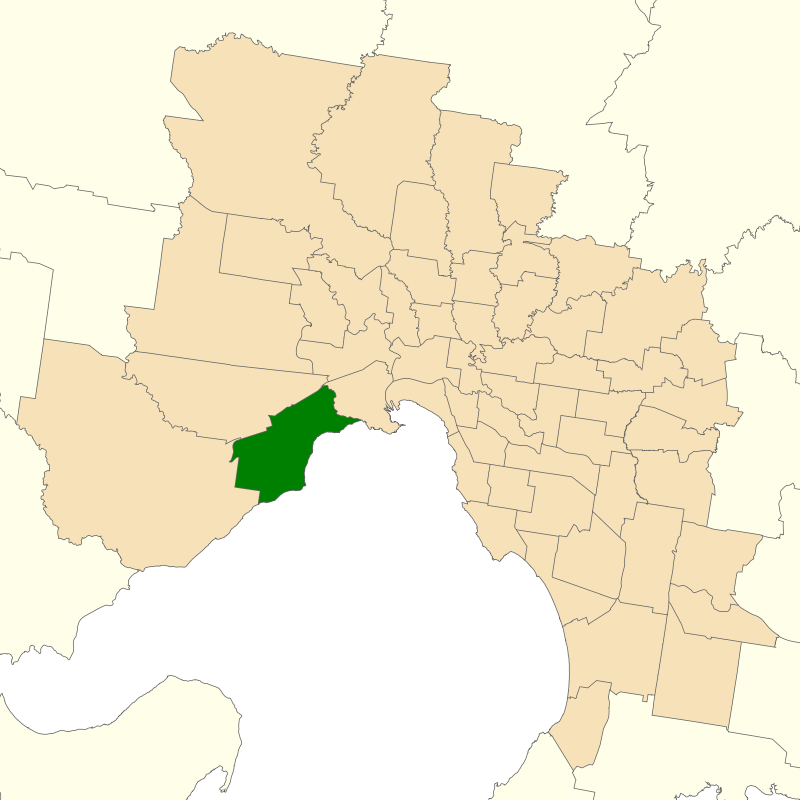
- Location of Altona (dark green) in Greater Melbourne
- State: Victoria
- Created: 1992
- Abolished: 2022
- MP: Jill Hennessy
- Party: Labor Party
- Electors: 55,418 (2018)
- Area: 79 km^{2} (30.5 sq mi)
- Demographic: Outer metropolitan
- Coordinates: 37°53′S 144°47′E

The electoral district of Altona was one of the electoral districts of Victoria, Australia, for the Victorian Legislative Assembly. It covered an area of 79 square kilometres (31 sq mi) in western Melbourne, and included the suburbs of Altona, Altona Meadows, Laverton, Point Cook, Seabrook and Seaholme. It also included the RAAF Williams airbase and the Point Cook Coastal Park. It lay within the Western Metropolitan Region of the upper house, the Legislative Council.

The seat was abolished by the Electoral Boundaries Commission ahead of the 2022 election and largely replaced by the electoral district of Point Cook.

== History ==
The Altona seat was created in an electoral redistribution for the 1992 election, and has been a safe seat for the Labor Party throughout its history. It was won in 1992 by Carole Marple, who was associated with the party's Pledge Left faction, a hard-left splinter from the Socialist Left. In 1993, a broad "peace deal" was struck between the Socialist Left and the right-wing Labor Unity faction, which saw both factions agree to deliver the Altona preselection for the 1996 election to Socialist Left candidate Lynne Kosky instead of Marple. As a result, Kosky defeated Marple for Labor preselection, and succeeded her as member for Altona at the 1996 election, while Marple instead contested and lost the marginal Legislative Council seat of Geelong Province.

Kosky served as a minister throughout the 1999–2010 Labor government under Steve Bracks and John Brumby, holding the positions of Minister for Post Compulsory Education, Training and Employment (1999–2002), Minister for Finance (2000–2002), Minister for Education and Training (2002–2006), Minister for Public Transport (2006–2010) and Minister for the Arts (2006–2010). Kosky resigned mid-term on 18 January 2010, citing significant health problems in her family. This necessitated a February by-election, which was won by former Labor state president Jill Hennessy.

Hennessy was re-elected at the 2010 election and 2014 election. Following the Labor victory at the 2014 election, she was appointed Minister for Health and Minister for Ambulance Services in the Andrews Ministry.

The seat was abolished ahead of the 2022 election and replaced by the electoral district of Point Cook.

== Members for Altona ==
Member	Party	Term
Carole Marple	Labor	1992–1996
Lynne Kosky	Labor	1996–2010
Jill Hennessy	Labor	2010–2022

== Election results ==
2018 Victorian state election: Altona
Party	Candidate	Votes	%	±%
Labor	Jill Hennessy	24,112	51.40	−0.54
Liberal	Christian Martinu	11,194	23.86	−7.58
Independent	Tony Hooper	5,861	12.50	+12.50
Greens	Emma-Jane Byrne	4,217	8.99	−1.04
Independent	Maria Aylward	1,522	3.24	+3.24
Total formal votes		46,906	94.56	+0.01
Informal votes		2,699	5.44	−0.01
Turnout		49,605	89.51	−3.13
Two-party-preferred result
Labor	Jill Hennessy	30,264	64.57	+2.01
Liberal	Christian Martinu	16,607	35.43	−2.01
Labor hold		Swing	+2.01	

Two-party-preferred vote results in Altona View source data.
