= Jill Hennessy (politician) =

Australian politician (born 1972)

The Honourable Jill Hennessy MP

54th Attorney-General of Victoria
- In office 29 November 2018 – 16 December 2020
- Premier: Daniel Andrews
- Preceded by: Martin Pakula
- Succeeded by: Jaclyn Symes

Minister for Health
- In office 4 December 2014 – 29 November 2018
- Premier: Daniel Andrews
- Preceded by: David Davis
- Succeeded by: Jenny Mikakos

Member of the Victorian Legislative Assembly for Altona
- In office 13 February 2010 – 26 November 2022
- Preceded by: Lynne Kosky
- Succeeded by: Seat abolished

Personal details
- Born: 17 March 1972 (age 54)
- Party: Labor Party
- Education: Monash University; University of Melbourne
- Profession: Lawyer
- Website: www.jillhennessy.com.au

Jill Hennessy (born 17 March 1972) is an Australian former politician. She was a Labor Party member of the Victorian Legislative Assembly between February 2010 and November 2022, representing the seat of Altona. She was Minister for Health in the Andrews Ministry from December 2014 to November 2018, and was attorney-general from November 2018 to December 2020, the second female attorney-general in Victoria's history.

== Early life ==
Hennessy was educated at Avila College, Mount Waverley, and then Monash University where she graduated with a Bachelor of Arts and Bachelor of Laws. She also holds a Master of Laws degree from the University of Melbourne. Prior to entering the Legislative Assembly of Victoria, Hennessy practised as a solicitor specialising in personal injury and employment law, and was a senior advisor to former Victorian premier Steve Bracks.

In 2016, she was awarded the Thornett Award for Promotion of Reason by the Australian Skeptics for "courageously facing down those who misrepresent and mislead the public in their promotion of dodgy medical claims and practices".

Hennessy is a member of Labor's left faction.

== Political career ==
A former candidate for preselection for the federal seats of Holt and Isaacs, Hennessy is a former State President of the Victorian Labor Party. When state minister and Altona MLA Lynne Kosky resigned early in 2010, Hennessy won endorsement for Labor preselection. She was elected to the seat in the by-election, but Labor suffered a large swing to the Liberal Party.

During her tenure as attorney-general, Hennessy worked on reforms relating to voluntary assisted dying, safe access for women's health services, childhood vaccination, medicinal cannabis and wage theft, as well as reforms to decriminalise public drunkenness, a spent convictions scheme and legislation banning gay conversion being introduced to parliament.

Hennessy was also attorney-general during the Royal Commission into the Management of Police Informants and, before the report of the Royal Commission was released, Hennessy referred the case of Faruk Orman to the Court of Appeal citing "credible evidence that there may have been a miscarriage of justice in Mr Orman's case arising from Nicola Gobbo's conduct and use as a human source by Victoria Police." After the release of the report she said "What we've seen and learnt throughout this royal commission over the past two years is truly appalling" and promised to implement all of the recommendations.

On 16 December 2020, she announced she would step down from the role of Victorian attorney-general effective immediately to spend more time with her family, but intended to stay in Parliament and recontest her seat at the 2022 election before announcing on 24 November 2021, that she would not be recontesting her seat in 2022.

Parliament of Victoria
Preceded by Lynne Kosky	Member for Altona; 2010–2022	Abolished
Political offices
Preceded by Martin Pakula	Attorney-General of Victoria; 2018–2020	Succeeded by Jaclyn Symes
Preceded by David Davis	Minister for Health; 2014–2018	Succeeded by Jenny Mikakos
Ministry created	Minister for Ambulance Services; 2014–2018	Succeeded by Jenny Mikakos
