= Electoral district of Lyndhurst =

Former state electoral district in Victoria, Australia

Lyndhurst Victoria—Legislative Assembly
- State: Victoria
- Created: 2002
- Abolished: 2014
- Electors: 41,578 (2010)
- Area: 98 km^{2} (37.8 sq mi)
- Demographic: Metropolitan

The Electoral district of Lyndhurst was an electorate of the Victorian Legislative Assembly. It was located in the south eastern suburbs of Melbourne. Included within its boundaries were Bangholme and Lyndhurst and parts of other surrounding suburbs, such as Noble Park and Springvale.

The seat was created at the 2002 election, replacing the district of Springvale. At that election it recorded the second biggest swing to Labor in the state, extending Labor's margin in the electorate to around 25%.

On 15 February 2013 the sitting member Tim Holding resigned, the resulting Lyndhurst by-election on 27 April saw Martin Pakula retain the seat for Labor. The seat was abolished prior to the 2014 election and largely replaced by Keysborough.

== Members for Lyndhurst ==
Member	Party	Term
Tim Holding	Labor	2002–2013
Martin Pakula	Labor	2013–2014

== Election results ==
2013 Lyndhurst state by-election
Party	Candidate	Votes	%	±%
Labor	Martin Pakula	12,844	41.0	–14.5
Family First	Stephen Nowland	4,431	14.1	+9.3
Democratic Labor	Geraldine Gonsalvez	3,447	11.0	+9.8
Independent	Hung Vo	3,058	9.8	+6.2
Greens	Nina Springle	2,946	9.4	+3.3
Sex Party	Martin Leahy	2,623	8.4	+8.4
Independent	David Linaker	1,358	4.3	+4.3
Independent	Bobby Singh	636	2.0	+2.0
Total formal votes		31,343	90.5	–2.4
Informal votes		3,283	9.5	+2.4
Turnout		34,626	79.7	−12.8
Two-candidate-preferred result
Labor	Martin Pakula	17,878	57.0	–6.9
Family First	Stephen Nowland	13,465	43.0	+43.0
Labor hold		Swing	N/A	

== See also ==
- Parliaments of the Australian states and territories
- Members of the Victorian Legislative Assembly
