= Tim Holding =

Australian politician

The Honourable Tim Holding
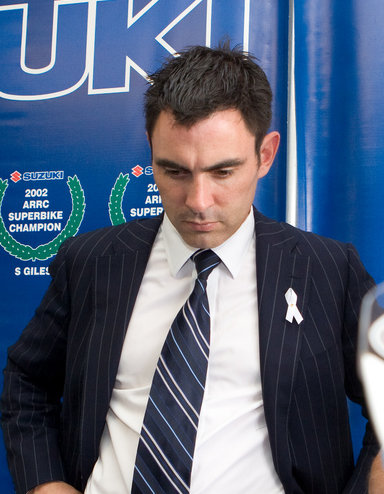
- Tim Holding, 2009

Minister for Tourism and Major Events
- In office 3 August 2007 – 2 December 2010
- Premier: John Brumby
- Preceded by: John Pandazopoulos (Tourism)
- Succeeded by: Louise Asher

Minister for Water
- In office 3 August 2007 – 2 December 2010
- Premier: John Brumby
- Preceded by: John Thwaites
- Succeeded by: Peter Walsh

Minister for Finance, WorkCover and the Transport Accident Commission
- In office December 2006 – 2 December 2010
- Premier: John Brumby (2007–); Steve Bracks (2006–2007)
- Preceded by: John Lenders (Finance, WorkCover and Transport Accident Commission)
- Succeeded by: Robert Clark (finance)

Member of the Victorian Parliament for Lyndhurst
- In office 30 November 2002 – 18 February 2013
- Preceded by: New creation
- Succeeded by: Martin Pakula

Member of the Victorian Parliament for Springvale
- In office 18 September 1999 – 30 November 2002
- Preceded by: Eddie Micallef
- Succeeded by: Seat abolished

Personal details
- Born: 21 August 1972 (age 54) Melbourne
- Party: Labor
- Education: University of Melbourne

Military service
- Branch/service: Australian Army Reserve
- Years of service: 1991–1993
- Unit: 1st Commando Regiment

Timothy James Holding (born 21 August 1972) is a former Australian politician. He was a Labor Party member of the Victorian Legislative Assembly from 1999 to 2013. He served as minister for water; minister for finance, WorkCover and the Transport Accident Commission; and minister for tourism and major events in the Brumby Ministry.

== Early life ==
Holding was educated at Haileybury College and the University of Melbourne, graduating with a Bachelor of Laws in 1997. From the early 1990s he was active in the Australian Labor Party and Young Labor; being elected President of Australian Young Labor in 1993; working as an electorate officer to state and federal Members of Parliament, and later as an assistant ministerial adviser, including for Senator Robert Ray (Minister for Defence).

He served in 126 Signals Squadron of the 1st Commando Regiment in the Australian Army Reserve from 1991 until 1993.

== Political career ==
=== Local government ===
Holding served on the City of Waverley council between 1992 and 1994.

=== State government ===
In 1999, Holding was elected to Victorian Legislative Assembly as the Member for Springvale at the age of 27. In 2002 he was elected the Member for Lyndhurst and appointed minister for manufacturing and exports, and minister for the financial services industry. Earning praise from former premier, Steve Bracks, as a 'rising star' of the government he was promoted in 2005 to the position of minister for police and emergency services and minister for corrections. Following a leak of confidential police files in late 2005, Holding refused to read a briefing about it, claiming that it contained errors and spelling mistakes. He was criticised by the opposition, with opposition leader Robert Doyle calling for his resignation.

Although there was a swing of 3.0% against Labor, Holding easily won the safe Labor seat of Lyndhurst in the 2006 state election by a margin of 25.1%.

After the 2006 election, he was given the portfolios of finance (including WorkCover and the Transport Accident Commission) and tourism as well as information and communication technology. Some initially saw this as a demotion, but Premier Steve Bracks described Holding as having done a 'great job' with finance being seen as central to government decision-making with fewer potential political difficulties than the notoriously tricky police portfolio.

He was promoted in an August 2007 reshuffle following the ascension of John Brumby to the premiership, receiving the responsibilities he held until the Labor party was voted out in the 2010 election. Holding had been touted as a serious candidate for treasurer, but lost out to John Lenders.

On 15 February 2013, Holding announced his resignation as shadow treasurer, shadow minister for industry and as the Member for Lyndhurst.

== Post-political career ==
After retiring from Parliament, Holding completed a master's in advanced global studies at SciencesPo in Paris. In February 2018, he was appointed as a visiting professor at King's College London. In 2020, he and his fiancée (now wife), Felicity Selkirk, bought the Château de Purnon in France for €740,000, and began a renovation of the building.

== Disappearance and rescue ==
On 31 August 2009, Holding was reported missing after he failed to return from a solo hiking expedition of Mount Feathertop, Victoria's second highest mountain, having walked up the Bungalow Spur. He was due to return at 4pm on Sunday 30 August, but made no contact with his family. Holding was located by the Australian Federal Police and was rescued on 1 September by a Victoria Police helicopter during a large scale search involving the Victoria Police Search and Rescue Squad, the State Emergency Service and Bush Search and Rescue Victoria.

Victorian Legislative Assembly
Preceded by Eddie Micallef	Member for Springvale; 1999–2002	Succeeded by Seat abolished
Preceded by Seat created	Member for Lyndhurst; 2002–2013	Succeeded by Martin Pakula
