= Electoral district of Ferntree Gully =

State electoral district of Victoria, Australia

Ferntree Gully Victoria—Legislative Assembly
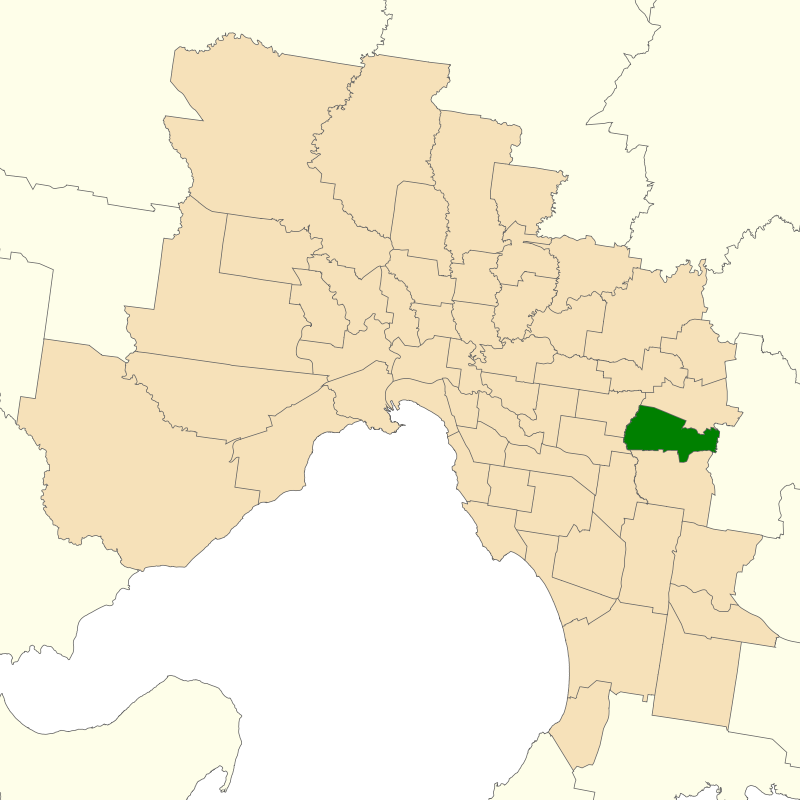
- Location of Ferntree Gully (dark green) in Greater Melbourne
- State: Victoria
- Created: 2002
- Abolished: 2022
- MP: Nick Wakeling
- Party: Liberal Party
- Electors: 41,141 (2018)
- Area: 34 km^{2} (13.1 sq mi)
- Demographic: Metropolitan

The electoral district of Ferntree Gully was an electorate of the Victorian Legislative Assembly. It was created in 2002 as a replacement for the abolished electorate of Knox.

The district comprised Ferntree Gully and its neighbouring suburbs at the foothills of the Dandenong Ranges.

When it was created, it had a notional Liberal majority of 7.6% suggesting it would be a fairly safe Liberal seat. However, Labor Party's Anne Eckstein won the seat at the 2002 election on the back of the Labor landslide. But at the following election in 2006, Eckstein lost Ferntree Gully to Liberal Nick Wakeling in a very close contest for the seat. The final result revealed a margin of 27 votes, or 0.04%.

The seat was abolished by the Electoral Boundaries Commission ahead of the 2022 election and split into the electoral districts of Bayswater, Rowville and Monbulk.

== Members for Ferntree Gully ==
Member	Party	Term
Anne Eckstein	Labor	2002–2006
Nick Wakeling	Liberal	2006–2022

== Election results ==
2018 Victorian state election: Ferntree Gully
Party	Candidate	Votes	%	±%
Liberal	Nick Wakeling	17,614	49.41	−4.49
Labor	Julie Buxton	14,618	41.01	+7.85
Greens	Steve Raymond	3,414	9.58	+0.49
Total formal votes		35,646	94.28	−1.02
Informal votes		2,162	5.72	+1.02
Turnout		37,808	91.90	−0.97
Two-party-preferred result
Liberal	Nick Wakeling	18,407	51.64	−6.10
Labor	Julie Buxton	17,239	48.36	+6.10
Liberal hold		Swing	−6.10	
