= Electoral results for the district of Melbourne =

Victoria, Australia, district election results

This is a list of electoral results for the Electoral district of Melbourne in Victorian state elections.

== Members for Melbourne ==
Member	Party	Term
Archibald Michie	None	1856–1859
David Moore	None	1856–1859
William Stawell	None	1856–1857
Henry Langlands	None	1857–1859
James Service	None	1857–1859
Geoffrey Carter	None	1889–1900
Edward Findley	Labor	1900–1901
James Boyd	Ministerialist	1901–1908
Alexander Rogers	Labor	1908–1924
Tom Hayes	Labor	1924–1955
Tom Hayes	Labor (Anti-Communist)	1955–1955
Arthur Clarey	Labor	1955–1972
Barry Jones	Labor	1972–1977
Keith Remington	Labor	1977–1988
Neil Cole	Labor	1988–1999
Bronwyn Pike	Labor	1999–2012
Jennifer Kanis	Labor	2012–2014
Ellen Sandell	Greens	2014–present

== Election results ==
=== Elections in the 2020s ===
==== 2022 ====
2022 Victorian state election: Melbourne
Party	Candidate	Votes	%	±%
Greens	Ellen Sandell	15,855	37.3	−1.3
Labor	Rebecca Thistleton	13,033	30.6	−5.1
Liberal	George Palackalody	7,522	17.7	+0.3
Victorian Socialists	Colleen Bolger	2,323	5.5	+5.5
Reason	Nicola Foxworthy	1,601	3.8	0.0
Animal Justice	Rabin Bangaar	701	1.6	−0.3
Family First	Michael Janson	535	1.3	+1.3
Freedom	Steven J. Smith	521	1.2	+1.2
Ind. (Indigenous)	Laylah Al-Saimary	428	1.0	+1.0
Total formal votes		42,519	96.6	+1.3
Informal votes		1,485	3.4	−1.3
Turnout		44,004	80.7	+0.1
Notional two-party-preferred count
Labor	Rebecca Thistleton	31,895	75.0	+0.6
Liberal	George Palackalody	10,624	25.0	−0.6
Two-candidate-preferred result
Greens	Ellen Sandell	25,593	60.2	+8.5
Labor	Rebecca Thistleton	16,926	39.8	−8.5
Greens hold		Swing	+8.5	

=== Elections in the 2010s ===
==== 2018 ====
2018 Victorian state election: Melbourne
Party	Candidate	Votes	%	±%
Greens	Ellen Sandell	15,755	38.85	−2.59
Labor	Jennifer Kanis	14,568	35.92	+6.65
Liberal	Darin Schade	6,920	17.06	−7.03
Reason	Leo Close	1,513	3.73	+3.73
Animal Justice	Lawrence Pope	830	2.05	−0.12
Liberal Democrats	Benjamin Rookes	410	1.01	+1.01
Independent	Peter Hanlon	328	0.81	+0.81
Aussie Battler	Kim Fuhrmann	233	0.57	+0.57
Total formal votes		40,557	95.29	−1.21
Informal votes		2,004	4.71	+1.21
Turnout		42,561	84.46	−3.08
Two-party-preferred result
Labor	Jennifer Kanis	30,521	75.25	+4.79
Liberal	Darin Schade	10,036	24.75	−4.79
Two-candidate-preferred result
Greens	Ellen Sandell	20,816	51.33	−1.04
Labor	Jennifer Kanis	19,741	48.68	+1.04
Greens hold		Swing	−1.04	

==== 2014 ====
2014 Victorian state election: Melbourne
Party	Candidate	Votes	%	±%
Greens	Ellen Sandell	15,333	41.4	+8.9
Labor	Jennifer Kanis	10,830	29.3	−5.0
Liberal	Ed Huntingford	8,913	24.1	−4.7
Animal Justice	Kate Elliott	802	2.2	+2.2
Christians	Neville Chisholm	491	1.3	+1.3
Voice for the West	Tehiya Umer	325	0.9	+0.9
Family First	Kerry Sutherland	306	0.8	+0.8
Total formal votes		37,000	96.5	+0.2
Informal votes		1,343	3.5	−0.2
Turnout		38,343	87.5	+2.3
Notional two-party-preferred count
Labor	Jennifer Kanis	26,071	70.5	+6.1
Liberal	Ed Huntingford	10,929	29.5	−6.1
Two-candidate-preferred result
Greens	Ellen Sandell	19,401	52.4	+7.1
Labor	Jennifer Kanis	17,599	47.6	−7.1
Greens gain from Labor		Swing	+7.1	

==== 2012 by-election ====
2012 Melbourne state by-election
Party	Candidate	Votes	%	±%
Greens	Cathy Oke	10,197	36.52	+4.60
Labor	Jennifer Kanis	9,321	33.38	–2.29
Sex Party	Fiona Patten	1,832	6.56	+3.67
Independent	Stephen Mayne	1,325	4.74	+4.74
Independent Liberal	David Nolte	1,302	4.66	+4.66
Independent	Berhan Ahmed	1,127	4.04	+4.04
Family First	Ashley Fenn	841	3.01	+3.01
Democratic Labor	Michael Murphy	521	1.87	+1.87
Christians	Maria Bengtsson	342	1.22	+1.22
Independent	Joseph Toscano	208	0.74	+0.74
Independent	Kate Borland	207	0.74	+0.74
Independent	Adrian Whitehead	169	0.61	+0.61
Independent Socialist Equality	Patrick O'Connor	162	0.58	+0.58
Independent Democrat	David Collyer	160	0.57	+0.57
Independent Secular	John Perkins	162	0.58	+0.58
Independent	Gerrit Schorel-Hlavka	66	0.24	+0.24
Total formal votes		27,925	90.66	–5.65
Informal votes		2,878	9.34	+5.65
Turnout		30,803	68.62	–18.31
Two-candidate-preferred result
Labor	Jennifer Kanis	14,384	51.51	–4.66
Greens	Cathy Oke	13,541	48.49	+4.66
Labor hold		Swing	–4.66	

Almost two-thirds of preferences went to Labor over the Greens. The two-candidate vote remained level during the polling booth count, however the postal vote count favoured Labor and put the result beyond doubt. The Greens conceded defeat on 24 July. The Victorian Electoral Commission (VEC) officially declared that Labor had retained the seat on 25 July. Results were final as of 31 July.

==== 2010 ====
2010 Victorian state election: Melbourne
Party	Candidate	Votes	%	±%
Labor	Bronwyn Pike	13,116	35.67	−8.89
Greens	Brian Walters	11,735	31.92	+4.51
Liberal	Luke Martin	10,281	27.96	+5.88
Sex Party	Rory Killen	1,061	2.89	+2.89
Independent	Peter Lazzari	231	0.63	+0.63
Independent	John Perkins	201	0.55	+0.55
Independent	Maxine Fensom	142	0.39	+0.39
Total formal votes		36,767	96.31	−0.01
Informal votes		1,409	3.69	+0.01
Turnout		38,176	86.93	+2.09
Notional two-party-preferred count
Labor	Bronwyn Pike	23,683	64.41	−7.0
Liberal	Luke Martin	13,084	35.59	+7.0
Two-candidate-preferred result
Labor	Bronwyn Pike	20,510	55.76	+3.88
Greens	Brian Walters	16,273	44.24	−3.88
Labor hold		Swing	+3.88	

=== Elections in the 2000s ===
==== 2006 ====
2006 Victorian state election: Melbourne
Party	Candidate	Votes	%	±%
Labor	Bronwyn Pike	14,149	44.6	−0.7
Greens	Richard Di Natale	8,704	27.4	+3.2
Liberal	Steve Papas	7,009	22.1	+1.1
Independent	Kevin Chamberlin	866	2.7	−3.2
People Power	Isabell Collins	526	1.7	+1.7
Family First	Rebecca Gebbing	496	1.6	+1.6
Total formal votes		31,750	96.3	+0.4
Informal votes		1,214	3.7	−0.4
Turnout		32,964	84.8	
Notional two-party-preferred count
Labor	Bronwyn Pike	22,677	71.4	−0.7
Liberal	Steve Papas	9,070	28.6	+0.7
Two-candidate-preferred result
Labor	Bronwyn Pike	16,512	52.0	+0.1
Greens	Richard Di Natale	15,238	48.0	−0.1
Labor hold		Swing	+0.1	

==== 2002 ====
2002 Victorian state election: Melbourne
Party	Candidate	Votes	%	±%
Labor	Bronwyn Pike	12,882	45.3	−12.7
Greens	Richard Di Natale	6,880	24.2	+24.2
Liberal	Sue Bourke	5,971	21.0	−15.3
Independent Labor	Kevin Chamberlin	1,690	5.9	+5.9
Socialist Alliance	Arun Pradhan	290	1.0	+1.0
Independent	Maxine Fensom	253	0.9	+0.9
Citizens Electoral Council	Jeremy Beck	242	0.9	+0.9
Independent	Michael Cebon	214	0.8	+0.8
Total formal votes		28,422	95.9	−0.4
Informal votes		1,212	4.1	+0.4
Turnout		29,634	87.5	
Notional two-party-preferred count
Labor	Bronwyn Pike	20,510	72.2	+9.8
Liberal	Sue Bourke	7,910	27.8	−9.8
Two-candidate-preferred result
Labor	Bronwyn Pike	14,757	51.9	−10.4
Greens	Richard Di Natale	13,665	48.1	+48.1
Labor hold		Swing	N/A	

=== Elections in the 1990s ===
==== 1999 ====
1999 Victorian state election: Melbourne
Party	Candidate	Votes	%	±%
Labor	Bronwyn Pike	20,572	59.3	+5.7
Liberal	Lana McLean	12,122	35.0	+4.2
Independent	Jorge Jorquera	1,986	5.7	+5.7
Total formal votes		34,680	96.3	−0.7
Informal votes		1,334	3.7	+0.7
Turnout		36,014	87.8	
Two-party-preferred result
Labor	Bronwyn Pike	22,122	63.8	−2.1
Liberal	Lana McLean	12,568	36.2	+2.1
Labor hold		Swing	−2.1	

==== 1996 ====
1996 Victorian state election: Melbourne
Party	Candidate	Votes	%	±%
Labor	Neil Cole	17,276	53.6	+2.1
Liberal	Chin Tan	9,907	30.8	−2.1
Independent	Gurm Sekhon	1,965	6.1	+6.1
Independent	Trevor Huggard	1,930	6.0	+6.0
Independent	Di Quin	808	2.5	+2.5
Natural Law	Amara Clarke	320	1.0	−0.8
Total formal votes		32,206	97.0	+3.0
Informal votes		1,006	3.0	−3.0
Turnout		33,212	88.4	
Two-party-preferred result
Labor	Neil Cole	21,145	65.9	+3.8
Liberal	Chin Tan	10,935	34.1	−3.8
Labor hold		Swing	+3.8	

==== 1992 ====
1992 Victorian state election: Melbourne
Party	Candidate	Votes	%	±%
Labor	Neil Cole	14,731	51.5	−15.9
Liberal	Kate Nunan	9,391	32.8	+1.5
Democrats	Bryce Vissel	2,319	8.1	+8.1
Independent	Dean Reynolds	824	2.9	+2.9
Independent	Dave Holmes	658	2.3	+2.3
Natural Law	Tony Botsman	517	1.8	+1.8
Independent	John Dobinson	156	0.5	+0.5
Total formal votes		28,596	94.0	+0.7
Informal votes		1,826	6.0	−0.7
Turnout		30,422	90.6	
Two-party-preferred result
Labor	Neil Cole	17,721	62.1	−5.8
Liberal	Kate Nunan	10,807	37.9	+5.8
Labor hold		Swing	−5.8	

=== Elections in the 1980s ===
==== 1988 ====
1988 Victorian state election: Melbourne
Party	Candidate	Votes	%	±%
Labor	Neil Cole	15,270	68.03	+7.07
Liberal	Catherine Dossetor	7,177	31.97	−0.19
Total formal votes		22,447	93.47	−2.22
Informal votes		1,569	6.53	+2.22
Turnout		24,016	84.87	−0.61
Labor hold		Swing	+4.71	

==== 1985 ====
1985 Victorian state election: Melbourne
Party	Candidate	Votes	%	±%
Labor	Keith Remington	15,155	61.0	−3.4
Liberal	Peter Jones	7,996	32.2	+7.9
Public Transport	Janet Walk	1,709	6.9	+6.9
Total formal votes		24,860	95.7	
Informal votes		1,121	4.3	
Turnout		25,981	85.5	
Two-party-preferred result
Labor	Keith Remington	16,209	65.2	−6.1
Liberal	Peter Jones	8,651	34.8	+6.1
Labor hold		Swing	−6.1	

==== 1982 ====
1982 Victorian state election: Melbourne
Party	Candidate	Votes	%	±%
Labor	Keith Remington	12,819	62.9	+4.1
Liberal	John Simmonds	5,102	25.0	−4.1
Democrats	Catherine Stewart	1,350	6.6	−2.0
Independent	Cecil Murgatroyd	626	3.1	+3.1
Communist	Roger Wilson	479	2.4	−1.1
Total formal votes		20,376	95.7	+1.4
Informal votes		911	4.3	−1.4
Turnout		21,287	90.0	+3.9
Two-party-preferred result
Labor	Keith Remington	14,147	69.4	+3.4
Liberal	John Simmonds	6,229	30.6	−3.4
Labor hold		Swing	+3.4	

=== Elections in the 1970s ===
==== 1979 ====
1979 Victorian state election: Melbourne
Party	Candidate	Votes	%	±%
Labor	Keith Remington	12,129	58.8	−3.6
Liberal	John Campbell	6,001	29.1	−5.7
Democrats	Trevor Cooke	1,769	8.6	+8.6
Communist	Roger Wilson	725	3.5	+3.5
Total formal votes		20,624	94.3	−1.6
Informal votes		1,247	5.7	+1.6
Turnout		21,871	86.1	−0.2
Two-party-preferred result
Labor	Keith Remington	13,608	66.0	+1.2
Liberal	John Campbell	7,016	34.0	−1.2
Labor hold		Swing	+1.2	

==== 1977 by-election ====
1977 Melbourne state by-election
Party	Candidate	Votes	%	±%
Labor	Keith Remington	10,026	56.8	−5.6
Liberal	Anthony Cree	4,769	27.0	−7.7
Democrats	Peter Bowden	2,853	16.2	+16.2
Total formal votes		17,648	97.4	+1.5
Informal votes		470	2.6	−1.5
Turnout		18,118	66.8	−19.5
Labor hold		Swing	N/A	

- Preferences were not distributed.

==== 1976 ====
1976 Victorian state election: Melbourne
Party	Candidate	Votes	%	±%
Labor	Barry Jones	15,104	62.4	+4.5
Liberal	Bruce Atkinson	8,415	34.7	+6.1
Independent	Lou-Anne Barker	696	2.9	+2.9
Total formal votes		24,215	95.9	
Informal votes		1,023	4.1	
Turnout		25,238	86.3	
Two-party-preferred result
Labor	Barry Jones	15,685	64.8	+3.0
Liberal	Bruce Atkinson	8,530	35.2	−3.0
Labor hold		Swing	+3.0	

==== 1973 ====
1973 Victorian state election: Melbourne
Party	Candidate	Votes	%	±%
Labor	Barry Jones	12,582	57.0	−3.5
Liberal	Michael Wallwork	6,244	28.3	+2.6
Democratic Labor	Anna Linard	1,682	7.6	−6.2
Australia	Michele Turner	1,558	7.1	+7.1
Total formal votes		22,066	94.4	+0.2
Informal votes		1,306	5.6	−0.2
Turnout		23,372	87.4	−3.4
Two-party-preferred result
Labor	Barry Jones	13,769	62.4	−0.2
Liberal	Michael Wallwork	8,297	37.6	+0.2
Labor hold		Swing	−0.2	

==== 1972 by-election ====
1972 Melbourne state by-election
Party	Candidate	Votes	%	±%
Labor	Barry Jones	unopposed		
Labor hold		Swing		

==== 1970 ====
1970 Victorian state election: Melbourne
Party	Candidate	Votes	%	±%
Labor	Arthur Clarey	12,768	60.5	+0.9
Liberal	Allan Waite	5,428	25.7	+0.6
Democratic Labor	Michael McMahon	2,908	13.8	−1.5
Total formal votes		21,104	94.2	0.0
Informal votes		1,289	5.8	0.0
Turnout		22,393	90.8	+2.1
Two-party-preferred result
Labor	Arthur Clarey	13,204	62.6	+0.7
Liberal	Allan Waite	7,900	37.4	−0.7
Labor hold		Swing	+0.7	

=== Elections in the 1960s ===
==== 1967 ====
1967 Victorian state election: Melbourne
Party	Candidate	Votes	%	±%
Labor	Arthur Clarey	12,904	59.6	+2.7
Liberal	Anthony Gilligan	5,436	25.1	−0.4
Democratic Labor	James Whitehead	3,302	15.3	−2.3
Total formal votes		21,642	94.2	
Informal votes		1,329	5.8	
Turnout		22,971	88.7	
Two-party-preferred result
Labor	Arthur Clarey	13,399	61.9	+3.5
Liberal	Anthony Gilligan	8,243	38.1	−3.5
Labor hold		Swing	+3.5	

==== 1964 ====
1964 Victorian state election: Melbourne
Party	Candidate	Votes	%	±%
Labor	Arthur Clarey	6,044	49.3	+1.3
Liberal and Country	Bill Burns	3,860	31.5	+3.2
Democratic Labor	Thomas Brennan	2,348	19.2	−2.8
Total formal votes		12,252	95.5	+1.9
Informal votes		575	4.5	−1.9
Turnout		12,827	90.2	+0.2
Two-party-preferred result
Labor	Arthur Clarey	6,248	51.0	−2.8
Liberal and Country	Bill Burns	6,004	49.0	+2.8
Labor hold		Swing	−2.8	

==== 1961 ====
1961 Victorian state election: Melbourne
Party	Candidate	Votes	%	±%
Labor	Arthur Clarey	6,340	48.0	−2.2
Liberal and Country	Bill Burns	3,742	28.3	+5.8
Democratic Labor	Tom Hayes	2,909	22.0	−5.3
Independent	Henry Roche	209	1.6	+1.6
Total formal votes		13,200	93.6	−2.8
Informal votes		896	6.4	+2.8
Turnout		14,096	90.0	+1.0
Two-party-preferred result
Labor	Arthur Clarey	7,101	53.8	−0.5
Liberal and Country	Bill Burns	6,099	46.2	+0.5
Labor hold		Swing	−0.5	

=== Elections in the 1950s ===
==== 1958 ====
1958 Victorian state election: Melbourne
Party	Candidate	Votes	%	±%
Labor	Arthur Clarey	8,129	50.2	
Democratic Labor	Tom Hayes	4,430	27.3	
Liberal and Country	Martha Yuille	3,645	22.5	
Total formal votes		16,804	96.4	
Informal votes		600	3.6	
Turnout		16,804	89.0	
Two-candidate-preferred result
Labor	Arthur Clarey	8,793	54.3	
Liberal and Country	Martha Yuille	7,411	45.7	
Labor hold		Swing		

- Two party preferred vote was estimated.

==== 1955 ====
1955 Victorian state election: Melbourne
Party	Candidate	Votes	%	±%
Labor	Arthur Clarey	6,913	48.9	
Liberal and Country	Alan Etherington	3,703	26.2	
Labor (A-C)	Tom Hayes	3,520	24.9	
Total formal votes		14,136	95.9	
Informal votes		597	4.1	
Turnout		14,733	90.0	
Two-party-preferred result
Labor	Arthur Clarey	9,132	64.6	
Liberal and Country	Alan Etherington	5,004	35.4	
Labor hold		Swing		

==== 1952 ====
1952 Victorian state election: Melbourne
Party	Candidate	Votes	%	±%
Labor	Tom Hayes	unopposed		
Labor hold		Swing		

==== 1950 ====
1950 Victorian state election: Melbourne
Party	Candidate	Votes	%	±%
Labor	Tom Hayes	14,219	66.0	+6.2
Liberal and Country	John Eddy	7,340	34.0	−6.2
Total formal votes		21,559	98.3	+1.1
Informal votes		368	1.7	−1.1
Turnout		21,927	90.5	+1.8
Labor hold		Swing	+6.2	

=== Elections in the 1940s ===
==== 1947 ====
1947 Victorian state election: Melbourne
Party	Candidate	Votes	%	±%
Labor	Tom Hayes	13,642	59.8	−40.2
Liberal	George Crowther	9,189	40.2	+40.2
Total formal votes		22,831	97.2	
Informal votes		647	2.8	
Turnout		23,478	88.7	
Labor hold		Swing	N/A	

==== 1945 ====
1945 Victorian state election: Melbourne
Party	Candidate	Votes	%	±%
Labor	Tom Hayes	unopposed		
Labor hold		Swing		

==== 1943 ====
1943 Victorian state election: Melbourne
Party	Candidate	Votes	%	±%
Labor	Tom Hayes	11,273	65.3	−34.7
Independent	John Somerville	5,991	34.7	+34.7
Total formal votes		17,264	96.2	
Informal votes		686	3.8	
Turnout		17,950	75.7	
Labor hold		Swing	N/A	

==== 1940 ====
1940 Victorian state election: Melbourne
Party	Candidate	Votes	%	±%
Labor	Tom Hayes	unopposed		
Labor hold		Swing		

=== Elections in the 1930s ===
==== 1937 ====
1937 Victorian state election: Melbourne
Party	Candidate	Votes	%	±%
Labor	Tom Hayes	10,902	63.0	−1.5
United Australia	Reginald Archer	6,407	37.0	+1.5
Total formal votes		17,309	97.0	−2.6
Informal votes		537	3.0	+2.6
Turnout		17,846	88.4	−6.9
Labor hold		Swing	−1.5	

==== 1935 ====
1935 Victorian state election: Melbourne
Party	Candidate	Votes	%	±%
Labor	Tom Hayes	11,320	64.5	+9.4
United Australia	Charles Lucas	6,239	35.5	−3.7
Total formal votes		17,559	96.7	−0.6
Informal votes		600	3.3	+0.6
Turnout		18,159	87.5	−2.8
Labor hold		Swing	+4.3	

==== 1932 ====
1932 Victorian state election: Melbourne
Party	Candidate	Votes	%	±%
Labor	Tom Hayes	9,289	55.1	−44.9
United Australia	William Hendry	6,610	39.2	+39.2
Communist	Ernie Thornton	953	5.7	+5.7
Total formal votes		16,852	97.3	
Informal votes		472	2.7	
Turnout		17,324	90.3	
Two-party-preferred result
Labor	Tom Hayes		60.2	−39.8
United Australia	William Hendry		39.8	+39.8
Labor hold		Swing	N/A	

- Two party preferred vote was estimated.

=== Elections in the 1920s ===
==== 1929 ====
1929 Victorian state election: Melbourne
Party	Candidate	Votes	%	±%
Labor	Tom Hayes	unopposed		
Labor hold		Swing		

==== 1927 ====
1927 Victorian state election: Melbourne
Party	Candidate	Votes	%	±%
Labor	Tom Hayes	12,115	66.6	
Australian Liberal	Carlyle Ferguson	6,071	33.4	
Total formal votes		18,186	97.4	
Informal votes		489	2.6	
Turnout		18,675	81.0	
Labor hold		Swing		

==== 1924 ====
1924 Victorian state election: Melbourne
Party	Candidate	Votes	%	±%
Labor	Tom Hayes	3,385	76.7	−23.3
Nationalist	Wilfred Kent Hughes	1,030	23.3	+23.3
Total formal votes		4,415	99.5	
Informal votes		23	0.5	
Turnout		4,438	57.3	
Labor hold		Swing	N/A	

==== 1921 ====
1921 Victorian state election: Melbourne
Party	Candidate	Votes	%	±%
Labor	Alexander Rogers	unopposed		
Labor hold		Swing		

==== 1920 ====
1920 Victorian state election: Melbourne
Party	Candidate	Votes	%	±%
Labor	Alexander Rogers	4,037	80.9	
Nationalist	Alfred Buchanan	951	19.1	+19.1
Total formal votes		4,988	98.4	
Informal votes		79	1.6	
Turnout		5,067	57.2	
Labor hold		Swing	N/A	

=== Elections in the 1910s ===
==== 1917 ====
1917 Victorian state election: Melbourne
Party	Candidate	Votes	%	±%
Labor	Alexander Rogers	unopposed		
Labor hold		Swing		

==== 1914 ====
1914 Victorian state election: Melbourne
Party	Candidate	Votes	%	±%
Labor	Alexander Rogers	2,799	64.0	−11.1
Liberal	Henry Hall	1,574	36.0	+11.1
Total formal votes		4,373	96.5	−1.8
Informal votes		159	3.5	+1.8
Turnout		4,532	44.8	−11.9
Labor hold		Swing	−11.1	

==== 1911 ====
1911 Victorian state election: Melbourne
Party	Candidate	Votes	%	±%
Labor	Alexander Rogers	3,233	75.1	+39.5
Liberal	Tom Brennan	1,070	24.9	−5.2
Total formal votes		4,303	98.3	−1.1
Informal votes		76	1.7	+1.1
Turnout		4,379	56.7	+17.6
Labor hold		Swing	N/A	

=== Elections in the 1900s ===
==== 1908 ====
1908 Victorian state election: Melbourne
Party	Candidate	Votes	%	±%
Labor	Alexander Rogers	781	35.6	+0.3
United Liberal	John Hamilton	668	30.5	
Liberal	James Boyd	661	30.1	
Victorian Socialist	Angus McDonell	82	3.7	+3.7
Total formal votes		2,192	99.4	+0.3
Informal votes		14	0.6	–0.3
Turnout		2,206	39.1	–8.6
Labor gain from United Liberal		Swing	+20.2	

==== 1901 by-election ====
1901 Melbourne state by-election
Party	Candidate	Votes	%	±%
Conservative	James Boyd	1,974	80.3	+53.3
Labour	Daniel Carter	483	19.7	−12.4
Total formal votes		2,457	99.98	
Informal votes		4	0.02	
Turnout		2,461	51.1	
Conservative gain from Labour		Swing		
