= 2012 Melbourne state by-election =

- 21 July 2012

Electoral district of Melbourne in the Victorian Legislative Assembly
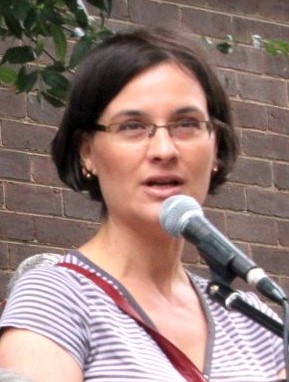

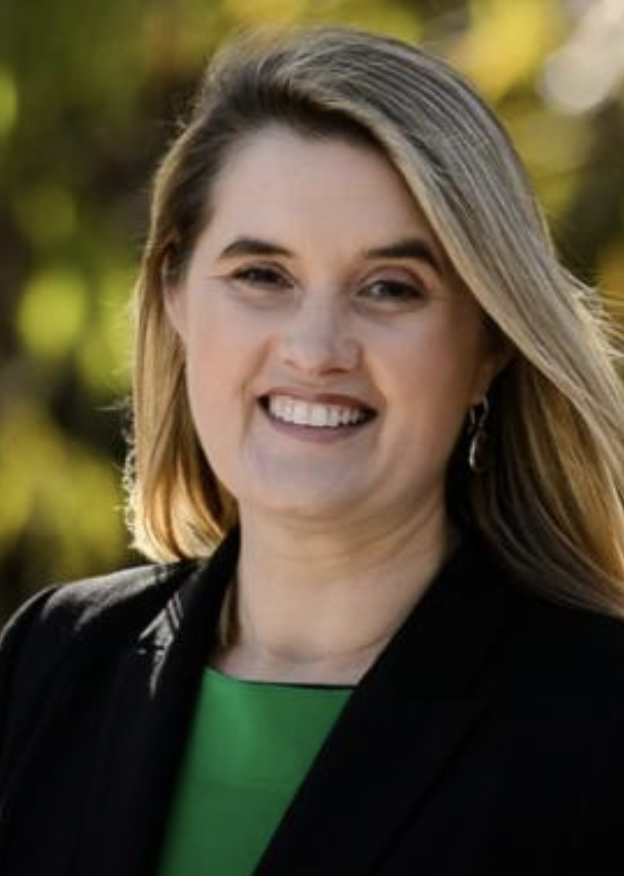
	First party	Second party
Candidate	Jennifer Kanis	Cathy Oke
Party	Labor	Greens
Primary vote	9,321	10,197
Percentage	33.38%	36.52%
Swing	▼2.29	▲4.60
TCP	51.51%	48.49%
TCP swing	▼4.66	▲4.66
MP before election
Bronwyn Pike
Labor
Elected MP
Jennifer Kanis
Labor

A by-election was held for the Victorian Legislative Assembly seat of Melbourne on 21 July 2012. This was triggered by the resignation of former minister and state Labor MP Bronwyn Pike which she announced on 7 May 2012.

Sixteen candidates contested the by-election, the Liberals declined to nominate a candidate. Jennifer Kanis retained the seat for Labor with a 51.5 per cent (–4.7) two-candidate-preferred vote against Greens candidate Cathy Oke.

== Dates ==
Date	Event
28 May 2012	Writ of election issued by the Governor
4 June 2012	Close of electoral rolls
21 June 2012	Close of party nominations
22 June 2012	Close of independent nominations, ballot paper order draw conducted
25 June 2012	Early voting began
21 July 2012	Polling day, between the hours of 8 am and 6 pm

== Background ==
The federal seat of Melbourne held by Labor was won by the Greens at the August 2010 federal election, where the Liberals preferenced the Greens ahead of Labor. At the November 2010 Victorian state election where the Liberals preferenced Labor ahead of the Greens, the Liberal/National Coalition won 45 seats and Labor won 43 seats in the 88-seat Legislative Assembly, resulting in a one-seat majority for the incoming Coalition government. Labor retained the state seat of Melbourne on a 56.2 per cent two-candidate-preferred vote against the Greens and a 64.4 per cent two-party-preferred vote against the Liberals. On the primary vote, Labor won 35.7 per cent, the Greens won 31.9 per cent, the Liberals won 28.0 per cent, and four other candidates won a combined 4.4 per cent. With the Liberals declining to field a candidate, there was an increased chance of the seat changing hands due to changed preference flows, such as at the 2002 Cunningham by-election (Federal) and the 2009 Fremantle by-election (WA State).

Due to the voting patterns to the Greens across jurisdictions, this state by-election, unusually received national attention.

== Candidates ==
The 16 candidates in ballot paper order were as follows:

Candidate nominations
Independent	Berhan Ahmed	Former Labor and Green member, Eritrean-born chairman of the African Think Tank, 2009 Victorian Australian of the Year.
Family First Party	Ashley Fenn	Victorian Director of Family First, and chairman of not-for-profit housing company Ethan Affordable Housing.
Independent	Gerrit Schorel-Hlavka	Self-described constitutionalist and serial candidate.
Independent	David Nolte	Liberal Party member and former Melbourne City Councillor (1988–93), ran on a "small-l liberal" platform.
Independent	John Perkins	Candidate for the unregistered Secular Party of Australia, and party president.
Labor Party	Jennifer Kanis	Melbourne City Councillor and anti-discrimination lawyer.
Independent	David Collyer	Candidate for the unregistered Australian Democrats. Campaign manager for Prosper Australia and Democrats candidate for the federal seat of Melbourne in 2010.
Independent	Patrick O'Connor	Candidate for the unregistered Socialist Equality Party. Member of the party's National Committee and contributor to the World Socialist Web Site.
Democratic Labor Party	Michael Murphy	Graphic arts designer and businessman, and Victorian party secretary.
Independent	Joseph Toscano	Anarchist campaigner and serial candidate.
Independent	Stephen Mayne	Former Liberal Party staffer, founder of independent news website Crikey, and Manningham City Councillor. Ran on an anti-pokies platform, endorsed by independent Senator Nick Xenophon.
Independent	Kate Borland	Public housing advocate.
Independent	Adrian Whitehead	Climate change activist, former Greens member and election candidate.
Australian Sex Party	Fiona Patten	Party president and Eros Association CEO.
Australian Greens	Cathy Oke	Melbourne City Councillor and scientist.
Australian Christians	Maria Bengtsson	No information available.

== Polling ==
- From 7 to 10 June 2012, 365 voters (5% MoE) in the seat were telephone polled by Roy Morgan Research. The Greens' two-candidate-preferred vote was at 54 per cent to 46 per cent for Labor. The Greens' primary vote was at 48.5 per cent, Labor on 37.5 per cent, and Mayne on 7 per cent, with "others including Gary Morgan and Kevin Chamberlain" on a collective 7 per cent. Morgan and Chamberlain did not nominate.
- On 16 July 2012, 403 voters (5% MoE) in the seat were robocall polled by ReachTel with results published in The Australian. The Greens' primary vote was at 38.1 per cent, Labor on 36.5 per cent, the Sex Party on 6.1 per cent, Mayne on 4.3 per cent, Family First on 3.8 per cent, with the remaining 11 candidates on a collective 11.2 per cent. While no two-candidate vote was produced, preference flows were said to be evenly divided between Labor and the Greens.

== Preferences ==
How-to-vote cards (HTVs) had six candidates recommending voters to preference Labor over the Greens: Ahmed, Family First, Nolte, the DLP, the Sex Party, and the Christians. Six candidates recommended voters preference the Greens over Labor: Perkins, Collyer, Toscano, Mayne, Borland, and Whitehead. Not recommending preferences were Schorel-Hlavka and O'Connor.

== Results ==
2012 Melbourne state by-election
Party	Candidate	Votes	%	±%
Greens	Cathy Oke	10,197	36.52	+4.60
Labor	Jennifer Kanis	9,321	33.38	–2.29
Sex Party	Fiona Patten	1,832	6.56	+3.67
Independent	Stephen Mayne	1,325	4.74	+4.74
Independent Liberal	David Nolte	1,302	4.66	+4.66
Independent	Berhan Ahmed	1,127	4.04	+4.04
Family First	Ashley Fenn	841	3.01	+3.01
Democratic Labor	Michael Murphy	521	1.87	+1.87
Christians	Maria Bengtsson	342	1.22	+1.22
Independent	Joseph Toscano	208	0.74	+0.74
Independent	Kate Borland	207	0.74	+0.74
Independent	Adrian Whitehead	169	0.61	+0.61
Independent Socialist Equality	Patrick O'Connor	162	0.58	+0.58
Independent Democrat	David Collyer	160	0.57	+0.57
Independent Secular	John Perkins	162	0.58	+0.58
Independent	Gerrit Schorel-Hlavka	66	0.24	+0.24
Total formal votes		27,925	90.66	–5.65
Informal votes		2,878	9.34	+5.65
Turnout		30,803	68.62	–18.31
Two-candidate-preferred result
Labor	Jennifer Kanis	14,384	51.51	–4.66
Greens	Cathy Oke	13,541	48.49	+4.66
Labor hold		Swing	–4.66	

Almost two-thirds of preferences went to Labor over the Greens. The two-candidate vote remained level during the polling booth count, however the postal vote count favoured Labor and put the result beyond doubt. The Greens conceded defeat on 24 July. The Victorian Electoral Commission (VEC) officially declared that Labor had retained the seat on 25 July. Results were final as of 31 July.

== See also ==
- Electoral results for the district of Melbourne
- List of Victorian state by-elections
