= Greg Barber =

Australian politician

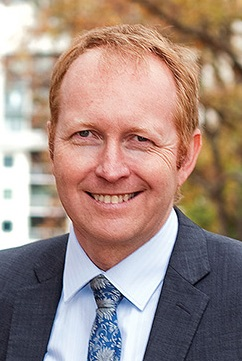

Leader of the Victorian Greens
- In office 23 December 2010 – 28 September 2017
- Preceded by: Position created
- Succeeded by: Samantha Ratnam

Member of the Victorian Legislative Council
- In office 25 November 2006 – 28 September 2017
- Succeeded by: Samantha Ratnam
- Constituency: Northern Metropolitan Region

6th Mayor of Yarra
- In office March 2003 – March 2004
- Preceded by: Sue Corby
- Succeeded by: Kay Meadows

Personal details
- Born: 31 August 1966 (age 60) Auckland, New Zealand
- Party: Greens

Gregory John Barber (born 31 August 1966) is a former Australian politician, who was a Greens member of the Victorian Legislative Council between 2006 and 2017.

== Early career ==
Barber obtained a Masters in Business Administration (MBA) from the Melbourne Business School and was a successful investor.

He became a corporate campaigner for The Wilderness Society. He was involved in the community campaign which led to the creation of the Plenty Gorge Park. Barber was also media manager for Cities for Climate Protection, and Bicycle Victoria. He has also campaigned for Environment Victoria, the Tenants' Union, and the Medical Association for Prevention of War.

He is the brother-in-law of Senator Richard Di Natale.

== Local politics ==
Barber was elected to the City of Yarra Local Council in 2002. He was Chair of Finance of the Council, and in 2003 was elected Mayor. He was the first Australian Greens Mayor of a local government in the country. During his time as Mayor, Barber and his Greens colleagues accomplished an increase in spending on bicycle paths and conducted soil contamination surveys of playgrounds and child care centres. He also organised the planting of street trees, worked on disability discrimination issues, and spoke out against exploitation in the sex industry.

== State politics ==
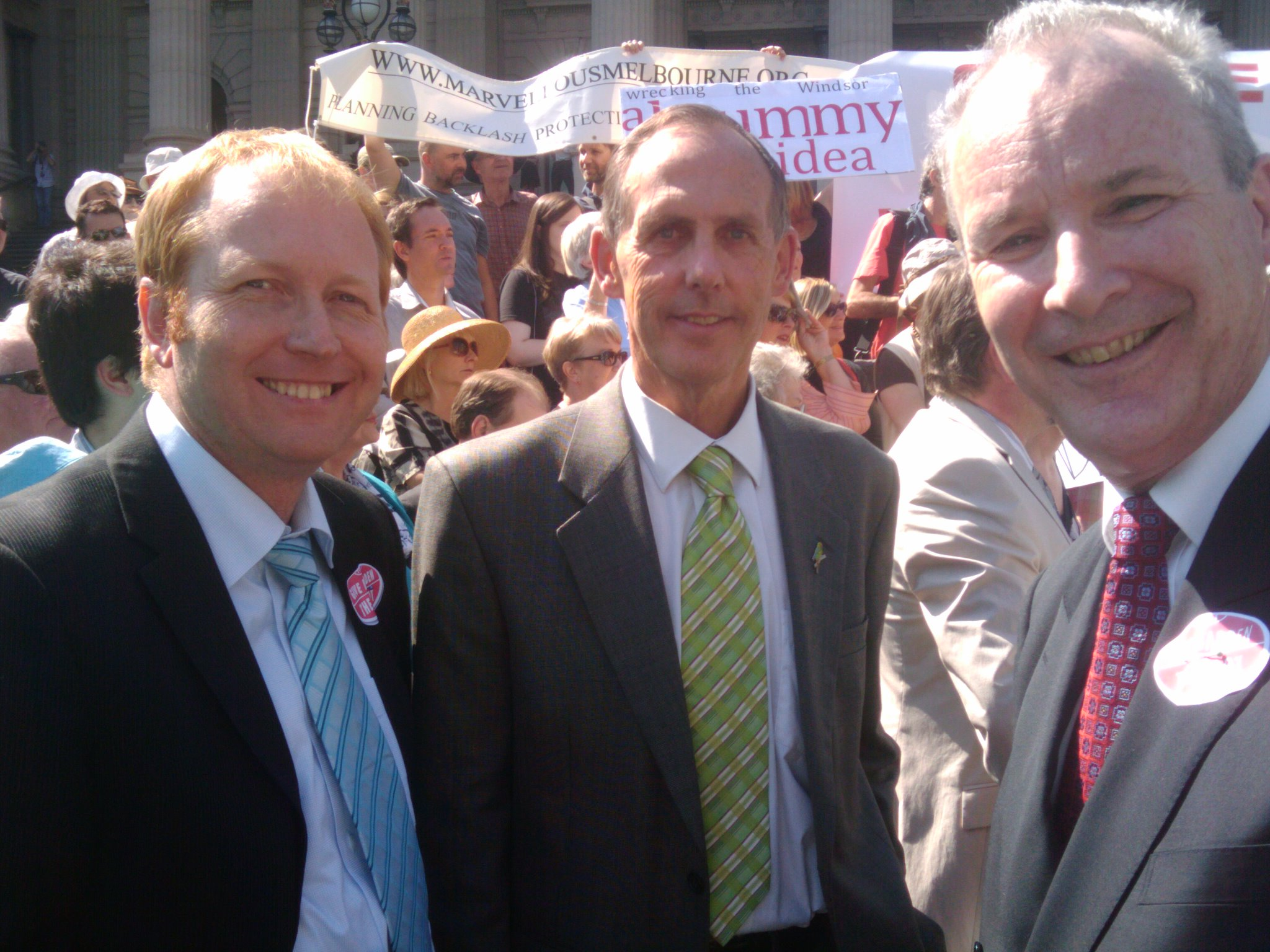
Greg Barber, Bob Brown and Brian Walters attending a protest rally in Melbourne

Barber won a seat for the Greens in the Northern Metropolitan Region of the Victorian Legislative Council in the 2006 state election. He received 59,360 primary votes and was elected with 16.48% of the vote. He was re-elected in 2010 with 18.51% of primary votes and in 2014 with 17.43% of the votes.

Greg Barber held the Aboriginal Affairs, Agriculture, Employment, Industrial Relations, Industry, Trade, Ports, Regional Development and Treasury and Finance portfolios for the Victorian Greens.

In December 2010 he was made leader of the Victorian Greens.

On 13 June 2017, it was announced in an email to party members that Barber, and Colleen Hartland, would not be seeking reelection at the 2018 Victorian state election.

In July 2017, Victorian Parliamentary Services and Barber reached a confidential settlement with a former parliamentary adviser over allegations of bullying and sexual harassment.

On 28 September 2017, Barber announced his immediate resignation from politics, stepping down as leader of the Victorian Greens. Barber's seat in the upper house was filled by Samantha Ratnam, who also replaced Barber as leader of the party.

== See also ==
- Politics of Australia
