= Joseph Toscano =

Australian anarchist

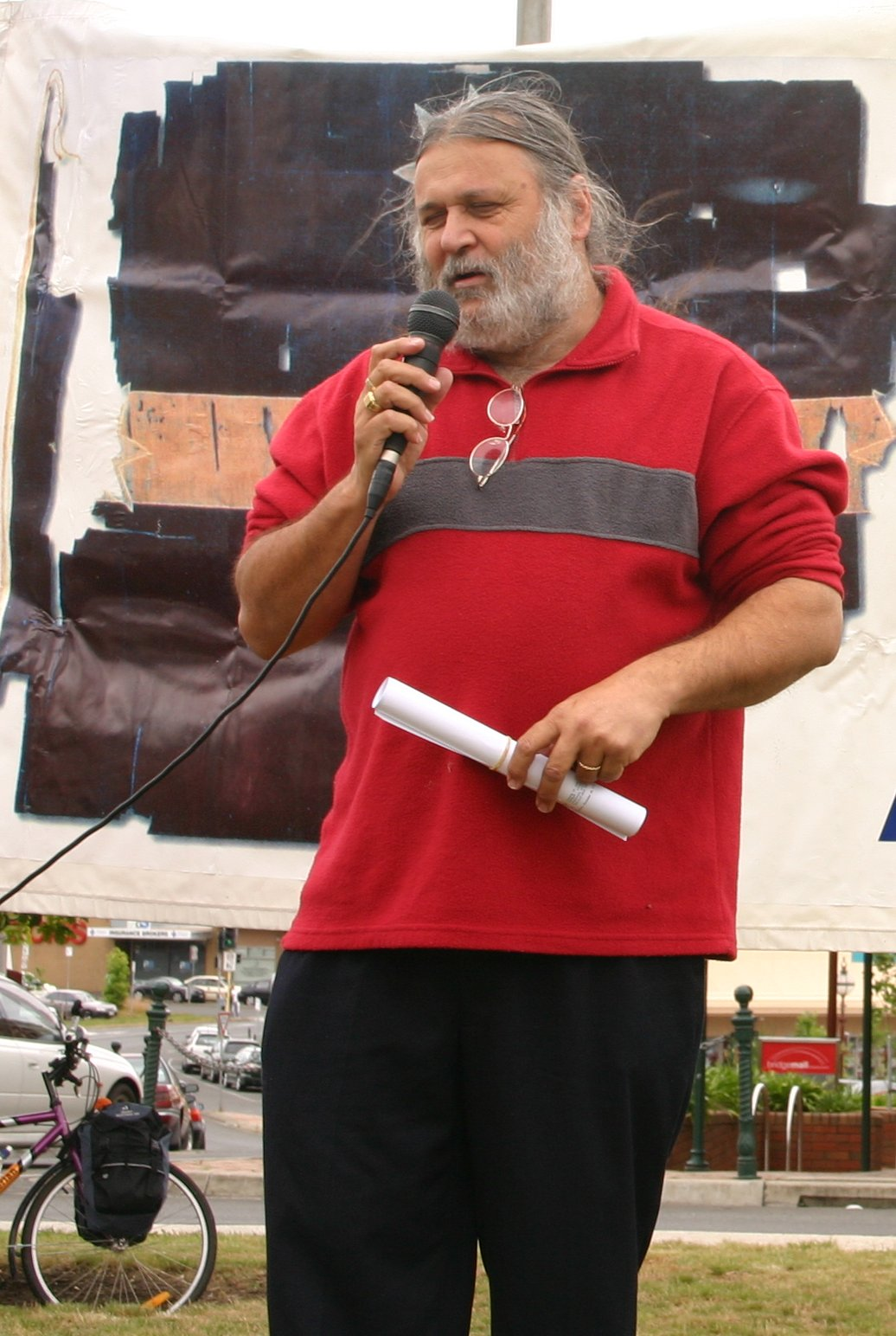
Joseph Toscano at the 2005 Eureka Stockade Commemoration

Dr Joseph Toscano (born 1951) is a medical practitioner, a broadcaster and an anarchist who lives in Melbourne, Australia. He has become widely known as an anarchist spokesperson for the Anarchist Media Institute through his broadcasting on community radio, his frequent letters to newspapers such as The Age and Herald Sun and his initiation of community campaigns. He was married to the artist Ellen José until her death in 2017.

He was educated in Brisbane at the University of Queensland where he acquired his Bachelor of Medicine/Surgery, then his doctoral degree from University of Melbourne. When he moved to Melbourne in 1977 Dr Toscano established an activist group called the Libertarian Workers for a Self-Managed Society.

Dr Toscano has presented the long running Anarchist World this week program on 3CR since 1977, which is also rebroadcast to community radio stations around Australia through the Community Radio Satellite managed by Community Broadcasting Association of Australia (CBAA). A talk back show with Joe Toscano is also a popular 3CR program. A weekly newsletter, the Anarchist Age Weekly Review has been compiled by Joe Toscano since 1991 and distributed around the world.

== Anarchist Centenary Celebrations ==
The Australian Anarchist Centenary Celebrations in Melbourne from 1–4 May 1986 were used by some anarchists to rebuff the negative connotations placed on the word "anarchy". Dr Joseph Toscano told a reporter from the Sun "Anarchy is a bogey word: we are coming out of the closet, as it were, to show that we do not have horns or tails. We are simply Australians who have a different philosophy of life. We don't believe in Big Government: in fact, we don't believe in government at all. Government, any government is based on violence and power. If you don't believe it, just look at your headlines over the past few weeks. Anarchy doesn't mean bombs in the street or supersonic bomber raids, it means 'without rulers'. Anarchy means voluntary co-operation and self-management, equality, shared economic decision making."

The Centenary celebrations included a May Day march on 1 May of about 400 people, including several large puppets and a number of anarchists from around the world. Over the weekend several events occurred including an anarchist film festival, banner, poster and historical displays, a two-day conference held at RMIT and Melbourne University, and a picnic in the Royal Botanic Gardens, Melbourne.

After the Anarchist Centenary Celebrations the Anarchist Media Institute was established by Dr Toscano and other Melbourne anarchists to increase the media profile of anarchists and correct bias and misconceptions about anarchism in the media.

== Campaigns ==
=== Display of Skulls in the Old Melbourne Gaol ===
In September 1997, the Anarchist Media Institute demanded the removal from public display of the skulls of two women in the Old Melbourne Gaol, part of a phrenology display by the National Trust of Australia. The skulls were from two women, Frances Knorr and Martha Needle, both executed by hanging in 1894 for murderous crimes. The skulls had been on display for 20 years. Descendants of the two women had been originally consulted about the exhibition and were happy with the display.

Joseph Toscano said the display was macabre, outdated and intrusive and asked why plastic replicas could not be used instead. Ms Diane Gardiner, the public programs manager said the museum had no intention to remove the skulls from display. However, the following February the skulls were removed from display with Joseph Toscano saying that they should finally be accorded a proper burial. Diane Gardiner denied the skulls removal was due to any pressure.

=== Friends of OUR ABC ===
During 2000, Joseph Toscano formed a lobby group, Friends of OUR ABC, to agitate against commercialisation and privatisation of the Australian Broadcasting Corporation In November he was elected unopposed to the Friends of the ABC management committee.

=== Reclaim the Radical Spirit of the Eureka Rebellion ===
In 2002, Dr Toscano initiated a commemoration of the Eureka Stockade on its anniversary date - 3 December.

The following year he was special guest of the 2003 Dawn Lantern Walk, and honoured as the occasion's Leading Light. Speaking on ABC Radio Ballarat about the Reclaim the Radical Spirit of Eureka events he said "We're quite concerned with the 150th anniversary celebrations coming up that people see this as an historical event which has no relationships to the type of society we are today," he said. "We're also concerned that it will become some type of sideshow which is basically just there for business, and the radical nature of the rebellion itself will be forgotten."

The Eureka 150 Democracy Conference in 2004 held at the University of Ballarat, which charged $600 per head admission, attracted an alternative democracy conference outside attended by Toscano. Graeme Dunstan, one of the participants in the alternative conference, said "We are here to bear witness to the fact that not only has the university been corporatised, no longer accessible to the poor, but it looks like democracy has been corporatised too,"

The debate about the significance of Eureka surfaced at the 150th anniversary commemoration in 2004. Prime Minister John Howard said about Eureka "it's part of the Australian story, not quite the big part that some people give it, but equally a significant part." Premier Steve Bracks replied "The reality is, put that aside, put that aside about whether it's a left movement, a centre movement, a right movement, I think the reality is it's a move for democracy, and that was a key." Dr Joe Toscano brought up the role of the police at Eureka and called on the Victoria Police to apologise for the massacre that took place after the battle was over.

=== Defend and Extend Medicare ===
During mid-2003, there was increasing concern over the reduction in Medicare bulk billing rates according to surveys of voters. Starting in May 2003, Dr Joe Toscano initiated a community campaign to Defend and Extend Medicare through a series of community meetings and rallies and electorate based local groups.

The Defend and Extend Medicare campaign was accused of having an anarchist agenda by the Minister of Health, Tony Abbott in December 2003. "This is a classic unity ticket. Classic rent-a-crowd," Mr Abbott told the Herald Sun. "These people are foisting a form of false advertising on the Australian public by pretending to be grass-roots community activists when they are the dribs and drabs of the extreme Left." The paper was briefed by "A senior intelligence official" about the activities of DEMG. Ministerial Officers had prepared a report on DEMG for the minister, which the Herald Sun had "obtained".

The following day, 6 December, the Herald Sun published the ministerial briefing notes on 8 Defend and Extend Medicare Activists, including Dr Joeseph Toscano. The Victorian Trades Hall Council called on the ALP to probe claims that Mr Abbott possessed such a report on the group, some of whose members are doctors and trade unionists. Subsequently, Labor's homeland affairs spokesman, Robert McClelland, referred the matter to Bill Blick, Inspector-General of Intelligence and Security, to investigate whether the Federal Government used police and intelligence agencies to discredit a campaign to defend Medicare. A spokeswoman for Mr Abbott agreed that an internal report had been compiled on the Defend and Extend Medicare group but dismissed any suggestion of improper behaviour on the part of health officials or the minister.

=== Case of Robert Thomas ===
In 2003, Toscano took up the case of Robert Thomas, an anaesthetic technician, after he was sentenced to 18 months jail and 300 strokes of the cane on theft-related charges in Saudi Arabia. When Mr Thomas's wife refused to confess to theft charges, the Saudi judge charged him with the crime of being aware of the theft. Dr Toscano accused the Australian Government of "sitting on its hands". A spokesman for Foreign Minister Alexander Downer denied the claim saying it was a matter for the department.

=== Election Campaigns ===
Dr Toscano has stood as an independent candidate for the Senate on several occasions since 1977. Although not enrolled to vote, through a quirk in the electoral laws he is allowed to stand as a candidate. After the 2001 election, he claimed an examination of the informal vote had shown that the number of Australians who have voted informal has increased by nearly thirty percent, and the informal vote in the Victorian Senate election has increased by nearly 100%.

For the 2004 election, Joseph Toscano and Steve Reghenzani ran as a Senate candidate team on a Don't Vote or vote informal platform. Dr Toscano said "We're encouraging people to vote informal if they don't believe in the system," he said. "Real power (in the present system) doesn't lie in Parliament - it lies in the boardrooms of national and transnational corporations. That's why many of the policies of both political parties are very similar."

Joseph Toscano and Jude Pierce stood as Senate candidates for Victoria in the 2007 Australian federal election. Their platform was based on "Direct Democracy not Parliamentary Rule" and included giving electors the Power of Recall where voters can petition to recall "non-performing" MPs and Citizen Initiated Referendum.

Toscano received 0.78 percent of the vote at the 2009 Higgins by-election.

In 2010, Toscano ran as part of the "Group B Independents" Victorian Senate ticket. The ticket received 3,906 Primary votes and 6,981 votes after Preferences.

He ran as an independent candidate at the 2012 Melbourne state by-election, receiving 0.75% of the vote.

In August 2013, Toscano nominated as a candidate for the Senate in the Commonwealth election. The election was held on 7 September 2013.

=== Electoral history ===
Election	Party	Seat	Votes	%
1990 Australian federal election	Independent	Senate (Victoria)	216	0.0
1993 Australian federal election	Independent (Group K)	Senate (Victoria)	199	0.0
1996 Australian federal election	Independent (Group J)	Senate (Victoria)	2,038	0.1
1998 Australian federal election	Independent (Group B)	Senate (Victoria)	2,205	0.1
2001 Australian federal election	Independent (Group E)	Senate (Victoria)	1,391	0.05
2004 Australian federal election	Independent (Group K)	Senate (Victoria)	3,418	0.11
2007 Australian federal election	Independent (Group I)	Senate (Victoria)	5,695	0.18
2008 City of Melbourne election	Independent	Lord mayor	815	1.41
2009 Higgins by-election	Independent	Higgins	523	0.78
2010 Australian federal election	Independent (Group B)	Senate (Victoria)	3,906	0.12
2012 Melbourne state by-election	Independent	Melbourne	208	0.74
2012 City of Melbourne election	Independent	Lord mayor	1,059	1.70
2013 Australian federal election	Independent (Group T)	Senate (Victoria)	1,637	0.05
2014 Victorian state election	Independent	Frankston	140	0.4
2017 Northcote state by-election	Independent	Northcote	331	0.9
2022 Victorian state election	Independent	Mulgrave	155	0.4
2025 Australian federal election	Public Interests Before Corporate Interests	Flinders	980	0.85

== See also ==
- Anarchism in Australia

== Bibliography ==
- Anarchy is Order Government is Chaos. Australian Anarchist Centenary Celebrations (Ed) Joseph Toscano & others (1988) Melbourne, No ISBN
- Reclaim the radical spirit of the Eureka rebellion Joseph Toscano, Parkville, Vic. : Anarchist Media Institute, 2005. ISBN 0-9758219-0-3
- Reclaiming the radical spirit of the Eureka rebellion! Dr. Joseph Toscano, Parkville, Vic. : Anarchist Media Institute, 2004. No ISBN.
- Why an Apology? Eureka and the Victorian Police Joseph Toscano Parkville, Vic. : Anarchist Media Institute, 2004. No ISBN
