= Anasina Gray-Barberio =

Australian politician

Anasina Gray-Barberio MLC
- Gray-Barberio in 2024

Member of the Victorian Legislative Council for Northern Metropolitan Region
- Incumbent
- Assumed office 13 November 2024
- Preceded by: Samantha Ratnam

Personal details
- Born: 1981/1982 Samoa
- Party: Greens
- Children: 2
- Relatives: Tala Gray (brother)
- Education: Deakin University
- Occupation: Social worker; Politician

Anasina Gray-Barberio (born 1981/1982) is a Samoan-Australian politician, non-profit executive and community worker. She is a member of the Victorian Legislative Council for the Northern Metropolitan Region. She has also worked in the community sector.

== Early life ==
Gray-Barberio was born in Samoa, the second of six children to Samoan rugby union international Paul Gray and health teacher Taualogomai Gray. She attended Utuali’i Primary School and the Leulumoega-Fou College before moving to Melbourne at the age of 14, settling in the suburb of Broadmeadows. Gray-Barberio attended Deakin University from 2020 to 2024, graduating with a Bachelor of Social Work.

She has worked extensively within the community sector, focusing on community engagement, development and project management with diverse cultural groups. She is the founder of Engage Pasefika, a grassroots organisation dedicated to overcoming gaps in culturally responsive health services and advancing health equity for Pacific Island communities. She has also served as a Community Advisory Committee member for the Royal Melbourne Hospital.

== Political career ==
Gray-Barberio filled the outgoing Legislative Council seat of former Victorian Greens leader Samantha Ratnam, who resigned to contest the Division of Wills at the 2025 federal election. Upon her appointment she became the first Samoan MP in the Victorian parliament. Gray-Barberio requested that she be sung into the parliament, a traditional Samoan custom, but her request to allow this by suspending standing orders was denied and the singing instead took place in the public corridors of Parliament House.

== Personal life ==
Gray-Barberio's younger brother, Tala Gray, is a professional rugby union player who currently plays for CS Bourgoin-Jallieu. She has two sons.
