= Samantha Ratnam =

Australian politician (born 1977)

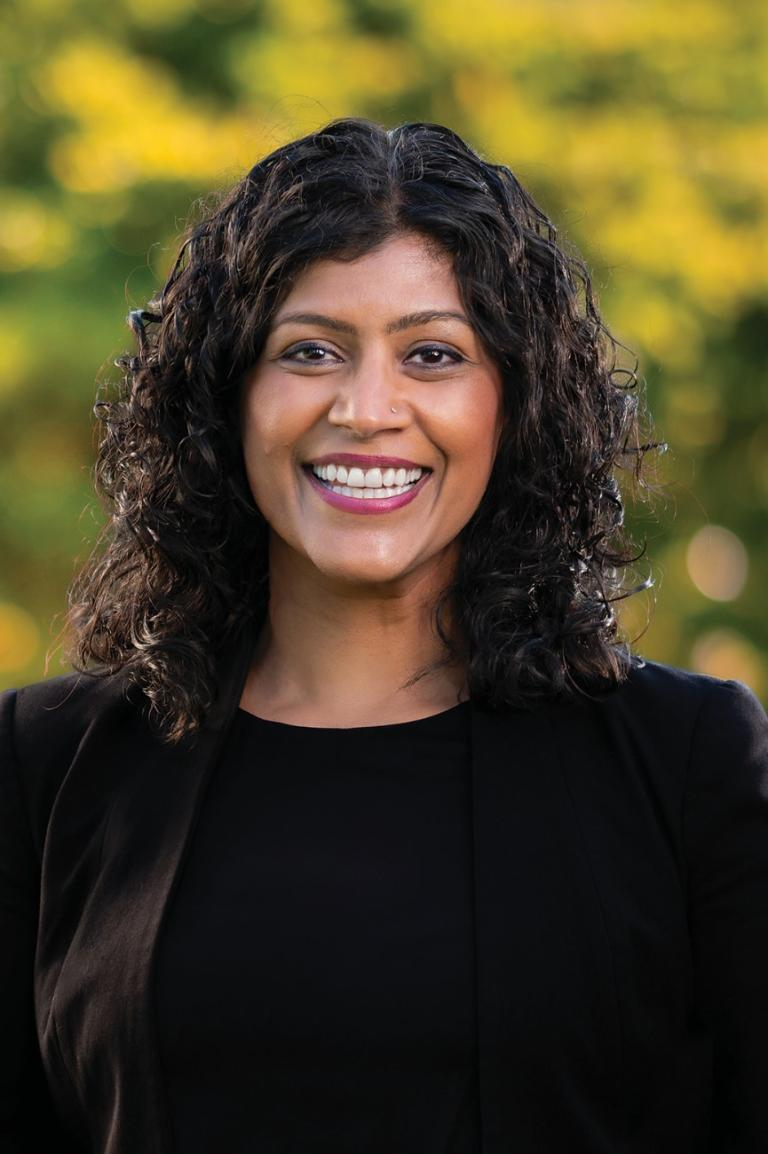
- Ratnam in 2024

Leader of the Victorian Greens
- In office 12 October 2017 – 23 April 2024
- Deputy: Nina Springle (2017–2018); Ellen Sandell (2018–2024)
- Preceded by: Greg Barber
- Succeeded by: Ellen Sandell

Member of the Victorian Legislative Council for Northern Metropolitan Region
- In office 19 October 2017 – 8 November 2024
- Preceded by: Greg Barber
- Succeeded by: Anasina Gray-Barberio

15th Mayor of Moreland
- In office November 2015 – November 2016
- Preceded by: Meghan Hopper
- Succeeded by: Helen Davidson

Councillor of the City of Moreland for South Ward
- In office 1 October 2012 – 11 October 2017
- Preceded by: Josephine Connellan
- Succeeded by: Jess Dorney

Personal details
- Born: 1977 (age 48–49) England, United Kingdom
- Party: Greens
- Spouse: Colin Jacobs
- Children: 1
- Education: Mullauna College
- Alma mater: University of Melbourne
- Occupation: Social worker; Politician
- Website: Samantha Ratnam website

Samantha Shantini Ratnam (Tamil: சமந்தா இரத்தினம்; born 1977) is a British-Australian social worker and politician. She was the leader of the Victorian Greens between 2017 and 2024, serving as a member of the Victorian Legislative Council in the Northern Metropolitan Region. Prior to this she was a councillor and mayor for the City of Moreland.

== Early life ==
Born in England and raised in Sri Lanka to a Tamil family Samantha Ratnam and her family left the country after the 'Black July' 1983 riots in Colombo that gave rise to 30-year Sri Lankan Civil War between the government and Liberation Tigers of Tamil Eelam, a Tamil separatist group. The family eventually settled in Australia in 1989 after spending time in Europe and Canada.

At the time of settlement in Australia, she held both British citizenship (by birth) and Sri Lankan citizenship (by registration). She became an Australian citizen in 1992, resulting in an automatic loss of her Sri Lankan citizenship under Sri Lankan laws. She then continued to hold both Australian and British citizenships until she renounced her British citizenship in March 2016.

From 1995 to 2001 Samantha Ratnam completed a Bachelor of Arts and a Bachelor of Social Work (Honours) from the University of Melbourne. In 2014, she completed her Doctor of Philosophy, titled 'Young people and global citizenship: New possibilities for civic participation', also from the University of Melbourne.

Ratnam has worked in various roles in assisting migrants and asylum seekers including at the Asylum Seeker Resource Centre, in the fields of drug and alcohol rehabilitation, mental health and international development. In April 2014, Samantha Ratnam explained in The Indian Sun, an online publication for the Australian-Indian community how she is a product of diaspora and her motivations for entering politics.

== Political career ==
=== Moreland City Council ===
Ratnam first stood for and was elected to the City of Moreland (now City of Merri-bek) Council for South Ward in 2012. In 2016, she was re-elected with her vote more than doubling to 50.71%.

In 2015 she was elected by councillors as the first Greens mayor of Moreland for 2016 in a 6 to 5 vote with Independent Councillor Helen Davidson and Socialist Alliance Councillor Sue Bolton supporting her bid for the mayor. Her election as Mayor was even noted in the country of her heritage, Sri Lanka, and by the Indian community in Australia, and in Tamil culture.

In her time on the council, Ratnam was instrumental in removing official council references to Australia Day, saying “this is a gesture of respect and an important step in healing”. Ratnam resigned from the council on 11 October 2017 prior to entering state parliament.

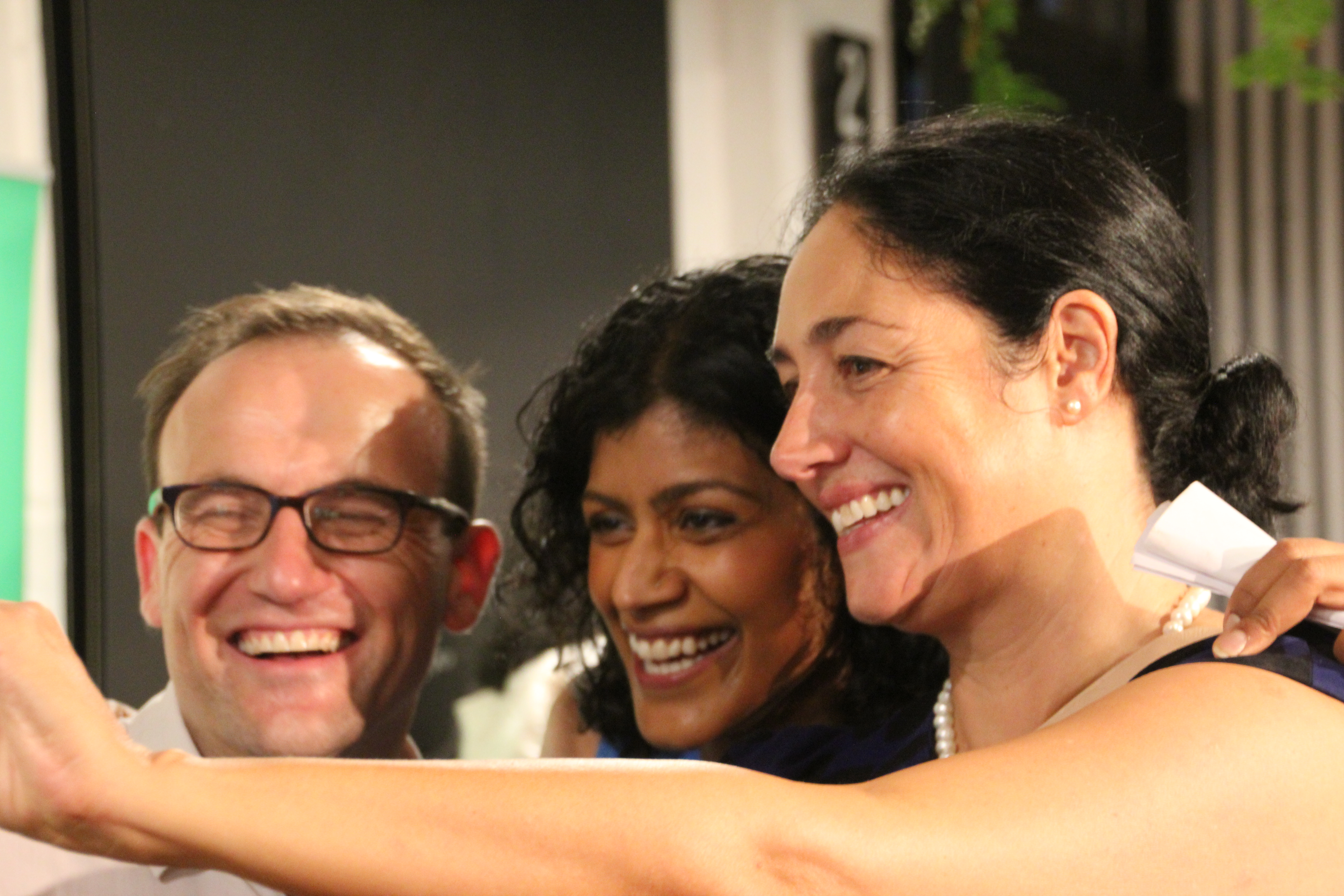
Ratnam (centre) at an event for her 2016 campaign in Wills, with Adam Bandt (left) and Greens candidate for Batman Alex Bhathal (right).

=== 2016 federal election ===
Ahead of the 2016 federal election the Greens preselected Ratnam to stand in the Division of Wills, where the sitting Labor MP Kelvin Thomson was retiring. She renounced her British citizenship in March 2016 in order to be able to stand for election. Although Ratnam substantially increased the Greens vote with a swing greater than 10 percentage points in Wills, the Labor candidate Peter Khalil won the seat with a 4.88 point margin.

=== State politics ===
Ratnam filled the vacant Legislative Council seat of former Victorian Greens leader Greg Barber, who announced his retirement from politics on 28 September 2017. On 12 October 2017, prior to having officially filled Barber's seat, Ratnam was appointed as leader of the Victorian Greens, becoming the first woman to lead the party at a state level. She was officially sworn in as a member of the Legislative Council on 19 October 2017.

Ratnam was re-elected in the Northern Metropolitan region at the 2018 state election, though her four party colleagues failed to win back their seats and she became the only Greens member of the Legislative Council.

==== Tenure ====
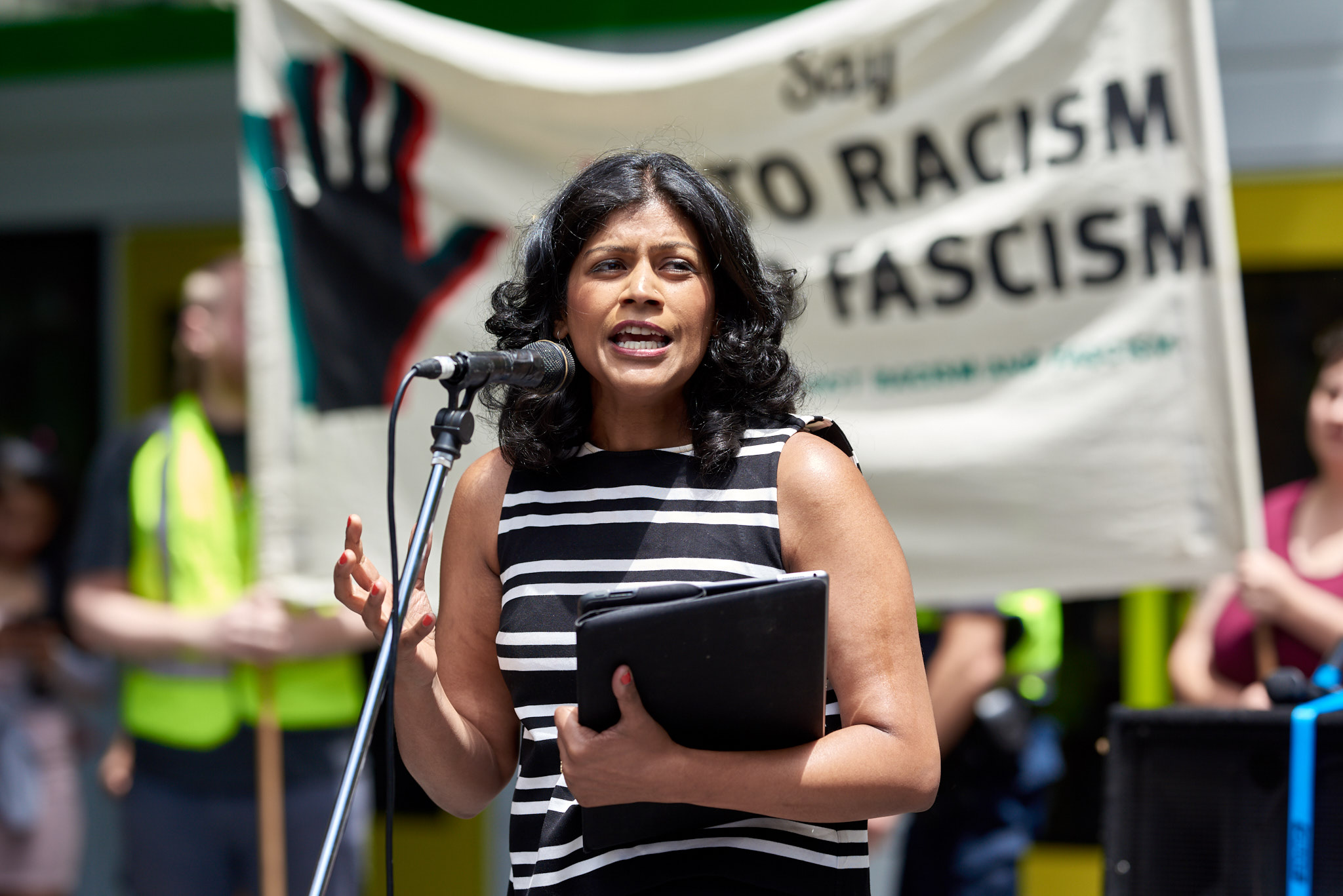
Ratnam speaking at an anti-fascism rally in 2019.

During her time in state politics, Ratnam has established parliamentary inquiries into the growing threat of far-right extremism (2022), the biodiversity extinction crisis (2019), and the waste and recycling crisis (2019). According to The Age, between November 2018 and November 2021, Ratnam voted with the Andrews Government's position 62.4% of the time, the fourth-most of any Legislative Council crossbencher.

In 2023, Ratnam threatened to block a proposal by the Labor Party in Victoria to increase housing supply unless half of all new developments were either affordable housing or public housing. At the time, South Australia required that 15% of all new development were affordable housing, of which 5% were for the highest-need groups. She said that for the Greens to support reforms to increase housing supply, "the reforms must demonstrate that they meaningfully address housing affordability, and are not merely a free ride for the property industry." Ratnam also called for a two-year rent freeze.

=== 2025 federal election ===
In April 2024, Ratnam announced her intention to run for Greens preselection for Wills again in the 2025 federal election. Later that month, Ratnam was pre-selected as the Greens candidate for Wills. She resigned as state party leader on 23 April 2024, and then from the Victorian Legislative Council on 8 November 2024. She lost the election to Labor's Peter Khalil.

== Academic research ==
As a social work PhD student, Ratnam contributed to a number of peer-reviewed research papers and academic books, including:

- The Nobody's Clients Project: Identifying and Addressing the Needs of Children with Substance Dependent Parents: Full Report – 2004 – Odyssey Institute of Studies ISBN 0975714805
- Identifying Children's Needs When Parents Access Drug Treatment: The Utility of a Brief Screening Measure – 12 October 2008 – Taylor and Francis Online
- Global Connections: ‘A Tool for Active Citizenship’ – 20 October 2009 – Taylor and Francis Online
- Youth-led Learning: Local Connections & Global Citizenship. Australian Youth Research Centre, Melbourne Graduate School of Education, University of Melbourne, 2008 ISBN 0734039859
- Chapter 12 Young People and the future in For We Are Young And ...: Young People in a Time of Uncertainty (Book) By Johanna Wyn, Roger Holdsworth, Sally Beadle – Melbourne Univ. Publishing, 15 March 2011 ISBN 9780522858365
- Chapter 4 Citizenship beyond status: New paradigms for citizenship education, in Educating for Global Citizenship: A Youth-led Approach to Learning and Partnership by Ani Wierenga, Jose Roberto Guevara. Melbourne Univ. Publishing, 1 February 2013 ISBN 9780522861006
- Young people and global citizenship: new possibilities for civic participation. 2015 (PhD thesis)

Civic offices
Preceded by Meghan Hopper	Mayor of the City of Moreland; 2015–2016	Succeeded by Helen Davidson
Party political offices
Preceded by Greg Barber	Leader of the Australian Greens Victoria; 2017–2024	Succeeded by Ellen Sandell
