= Arthur Clarey =

Australian politician

Member of the Victorian Legislative Assembly for Melbourne
- In office 28 May 1955 – 9 May 1972
- Preceded by: Tom Hayes
- Succeeded by: Barry Jones

Personal details
- Born: 15 March 1897 South Yarra, Victoria Colony, British Empire
- Died: 9 May 1972 (aged 75) Fitzroy, Victoria, Australia
- Spouses: Irene Mary Leech (m. 1940–1957) Doris Jane McGinnis (m. 1958)
- Parents: Francis William Clarey (father); Catherine Lawson (mother)
- Relatives: Percy Clarey (half-brother)
- Education: Flemington State School; Melbourne High School; Melbourne University

Reynold Arthur Clarey (15 March 1897 – 9 May 1972) was an Australian politician.

Born in South Yarra to estate agent Francis William Clarey and Catherine Lawson (his half-brother Percy would also go on to be a prominent politician and unionist), Arthur attended Flemington State School, Melbourne High School and Melbourne University, graduating with a Bachelor of Commerce. He was employed as a clerk with the Victorian Public Service from 1913 to 1920 and with BHP from 1920 to 1947. On 23 September 1940 he married Irene Mary Leech, who died in 1957; he remarried on 1 July 1958 Doris Jane McGinnis, née Blythe. Clarey joined the Labor Party in 1932, and was later president of the Clerks' Union. In 1955 he was elected to the Victorian Legislative Assembly for Melbourne. He was the auditor of the state branch from 1955 to 1970 and the parliamentary treasury spokesman from 1967 to 1970. He died in 1972 at Fitzroy.

Parliament of Victoria
Preceded by Tom Hayes	Member for Melbourne; 1955–1972	Succeeded by Barry Jones
