= Alexander Rogers (Australian politician) =

Australian politician

Alexander Rogers (4 June 1869 – 2 August 1928) was an Australian politician.

Rogers was born in Essendon to carpenter Henry Rogers and Jessie Forbes. He was a butcher at Port Melbourne and was a member of the Trades Hall Council. On 11 December 1890 he married Ellen Harvey, with whom he had five children. He served on Port Melbourne City Council from 1904 to 1910 and was mayor from 1908 to 1909.

In 1908 Rogers was elected to the Victorian Legislative Assembly as the Labor member for Melbourne. He served until May 1924, when he retired from politics. Rogers died in Preston in 1928.

Victorian Legislative Assembly
Preceded by James Boyd	Member for Melbourne; 1908–1924	Succeeded by Tom Hayes
