= Victorian Greens =

Victorian Greens Australian Greens Victoria
- Leader: Ellen Sandell
- Deputy Leader: Sarah Mansfield
- Founded: 1992; 34 years ago
- Headquarters: Queen St; Melbourne VIC 3000
- Youth wing: Victorian Young Greens
- LGBTQIA+ wing: Queer Greens Victoria
- Disabled wing: Accessible Victorian Greens
- Membership (Sep, 2026): ▲3,602
- Ideology: Green politics Progressivism
- Political position: Left-wing
- National affiliation: Australian Greens
- Colours: Green
- House of Representatives: 0 / 39 (Victorian seats)
- Senate: 1 / 12 (Victorian seats)
- Legislative Assembly: 2 / 88
- Legislative Council: 4 / 40
- Local government: 28 / 656

Website
- greens.org.au/vic

The Victorian Greens, officially known as the Australian Greens Victoria, is the Victorian state member party of the Australian Greens, a green political party in Australia.

== History ==
=== Early years ===
The Australian Greens Victoria was formed in 1992, as a response to the formation of the Australian Greens which united pre-existing Green parties in Tasmania, New South Wales, Queensland and the ACT. The meeting that agreed in principle to form the party was held on 7 November 1992 under a tree in the Darling Gardens, Collingwood, as the key to the community centre had been misplaced. Two independents affiliated with the nascent Victorian Greens stood in the 1992 Victorian state election, with Jenny Saulwick standing in Monbulk and Colleen Hartland standing in Footscray. The first election the Greens contested in Victoria as a registered party was the 1993 federal election where the party contested the seat of La Trobe.

Peter Singer ran as the party’s a lead Senate candidate in 1996, recording 2.9% of the vote, before Charmaine Clarke recorded 2.5% of the vote in 1998. A number of Greens again stood as independents in the 1996 Victorian state election, including Jenny Henty in Hawthorn, Greg Barber in Northcote, and Gurm Sekhon in Melbourne.

=== 1999 onwards ===
In March 1999, barrister David Risstrom was elected to the Melbourne City Council, following numerous local government campaigns in Victoria. Risstrom was re-elected in 2001 and retired in 2004 in order to contest the Senate in the Australian national elections of that year. Fraser Brindley, previously elected to Moreland City Council as a Greens representative in 2002, ran successfully for Melbourne City Council in 2004.

The first Greens candidate in Australia to be elected in a single-member electorate was Gurm Sekhon, elected to Yarra City Council in 2001. In 2002 Sekhon was re-elected and three more Greens were elected to Yarra City Council, giving the Greens 4 out of 9 seats on Council. In 2003 Yarra City Councillor Greg Barber became Australia's first Greens Mayor. Janet Rice was elected to Maribyrnong City Council in 2003 with a primary vote of 42%.

In 2005 Janet Rice was re-elected to a second term at Maribyrnong City Council and subsequently became Mayor. David Jones was elected to and became Mayor the City of Greater Bendigo, and a total of 14 Green local government councillors held office across Victoria, in Cities or Shires of Melbourne, Yarra, Maribyrnong, Moreland, Moonee Valley, Yarra Ranges, Whitehorse, Brimbank, Mount Alexander and Greater Bendigo.

In the yearly mayoral elections in 2006, Greater Bendigo Councillors elected back to back Green Mayors by electing Julie Rivendell to succeed David Jones, and Ben Opie was elected as Moonee Valley's first, and Victoria's fifth Green Mayor. In the Mayoral vote for 2007–08 Bendigo elected Cr David Jones again, making him the First Green Mayor to serve two terms and Bendigo to become the first council in Australia to have three Green Mayors.

The 2008 local government elections saw the first elections of Greens Councillors into Darebin, Glen Eira, Manningham, Queenscliffe, Surf Coast and Casey Councils, and saw Samantha Dunn re-elected in a single-member ward in Yarra Ranges with a strong 53% primary vote. Three Green mayors were elected following the elections: Amanda Stone in Yarra, Philip Schier in Mount Alexander, and Helen Harris in Whitehorse. Philip Schier was re-elected in 2009, and Bill Pemberton became Mayor of Whitehorse. Alison Clarke was the 2011 Greens Mayor of the City of Yarra.

The state’s 2012 Local government elections saw Greens elect Councillors for the first time to the City of Ballarat (Belinda Coates) and the City of Greater Dandenong (Matthew Kirwan).

Local government elections in 2016 saw the number of Green Councillors across Victoria, rise from 17 to 29. This included first-time breakthroughs with the election of Josh Fergeus in Monash, Peter Castaldo in Banyule, Michael Schilling in Cardinia, and Jonathon Marsden in Hobsons Bay, who went on to become the first Greens mayor of Hobsons Bay for 2019.

In 2020, local elections raised the number of elected Greens councillors from 29 to 36, including three out of nine in Darebin, four out of eleven in Merri-bek, and five out of nine in Yarra, the first jurisdiction in Australia to have a majority Green chamber.

In April 2024, both Greens councillors in Monash − Anjalee de Silva and Josh Fergeus − left the party.

== Structure ==
=== State Council ===
Decisions affecting the state party are made through the State Council, a 15 member governing body made up of 14 State Councillors elected by the membership and 1 State Councillor appointed by the First Nations working group.

=== Branches ===
Local branch catchment areas are based on local government area boundaries. A member residing within a branch catchment area is generally registered to that branch, while a member residing outside of any branch catchment area is considered "at-large", unless a member asks to be moved into another branch.

In addition, branches can establish working groups and subcommittees to specialise in specific interest areas, tasks, and campaigns.

Each branch elects Office Bearers consisting of at least a Convenor, Treasurer and Secretary.

=== Candidate preselections ===
Local Government, State lower house and House of Representatives candidates are preselected by a ballot of members residing only within those electorate, while state upper house lead candidates are decided by a ballot of all party members residing in the respective electoral region. Federal Senate lead candidates are decided by a ballot of members across the whole state.

== Leaders ==
On Saturday 12 November 2005 at the national conference in Hobart the Australian Greens abandoned their long-standing tradition of having no official leader and approved a process whereby a parliamentary leader could be elected by the Greens Parliamentary Party Room. The Victorian division of the party announced Greg Barber as the inaugural leader of the party in December 2010.

#	Portrait	Leader	Seat	Term start	Term end	Time in office	Elections contested	Premier (term)
1		Greg Barber	MLC for Northern Metropolitan	23 December 2010	28 September 2017	6 years, 279 days	2014	Ballieu 2010-2013
1		Greg Barber	MLC for Northern Metropolitan	23 December 2010	28 September 2017	6 years, 279 days	2014	Napthine 2013-2014
1		Greg Barber	MLC for Northern Metropolitan	23 December 2010	28 September 2017	6 years, 279 days	2014	Andrews 2014-2023
2		Samantha Ratnam	MLC for Northern Metropolitan	12 October 2017	23 April 2024	6 years, 194 days	2018, 2022	Andrews 2014-2023
2		Samantha Ratnam	MLC for Northern Metropolitan	12 October 2017	23 April 2024	6 years, 194 days	2018, 2022	Allan 2023-2026
3		Ellen Sandell	MLA for Melbourne	23 April 2024	Incumbent	2 years, 208 days	–	Allan 2023-2026
3		Ellen Sandell	MLA for Melbourne	23 April 2024	Incumbent	2 years, 208 days	–	Carroll 2026-

== Election results ==
=== State elections ===
Victorian election results

Primary vote
- 1999: 1.2%
- 2002: 8.6%
- 2006: 10.0%
- 2010: 11.2%
- 2014: 11.5%
- 2018: 10.7%
- 2022: 11.5%

Three Greens representatives were elected to the Victorian Legislative Council at the 2006 state election. Greg Barber won a seat in the Northern Metropolitan Region, Colleen Hartland won a seat in the Western Metropolitan Region after a recount, and Sue Pennicuik won a seat in the Southern Metropolitan Region.

The 2010 State elections saw an increase in the Greens vote – a 1.2% swing to give a primary vote of 11.21% with all three MLCs re-elected.

At the 2012 Melbourne state by-election, the Greens increased their two-candidate-preferred vote from 43.8 percent to 48.5 percent, but we’re unsuccessful.

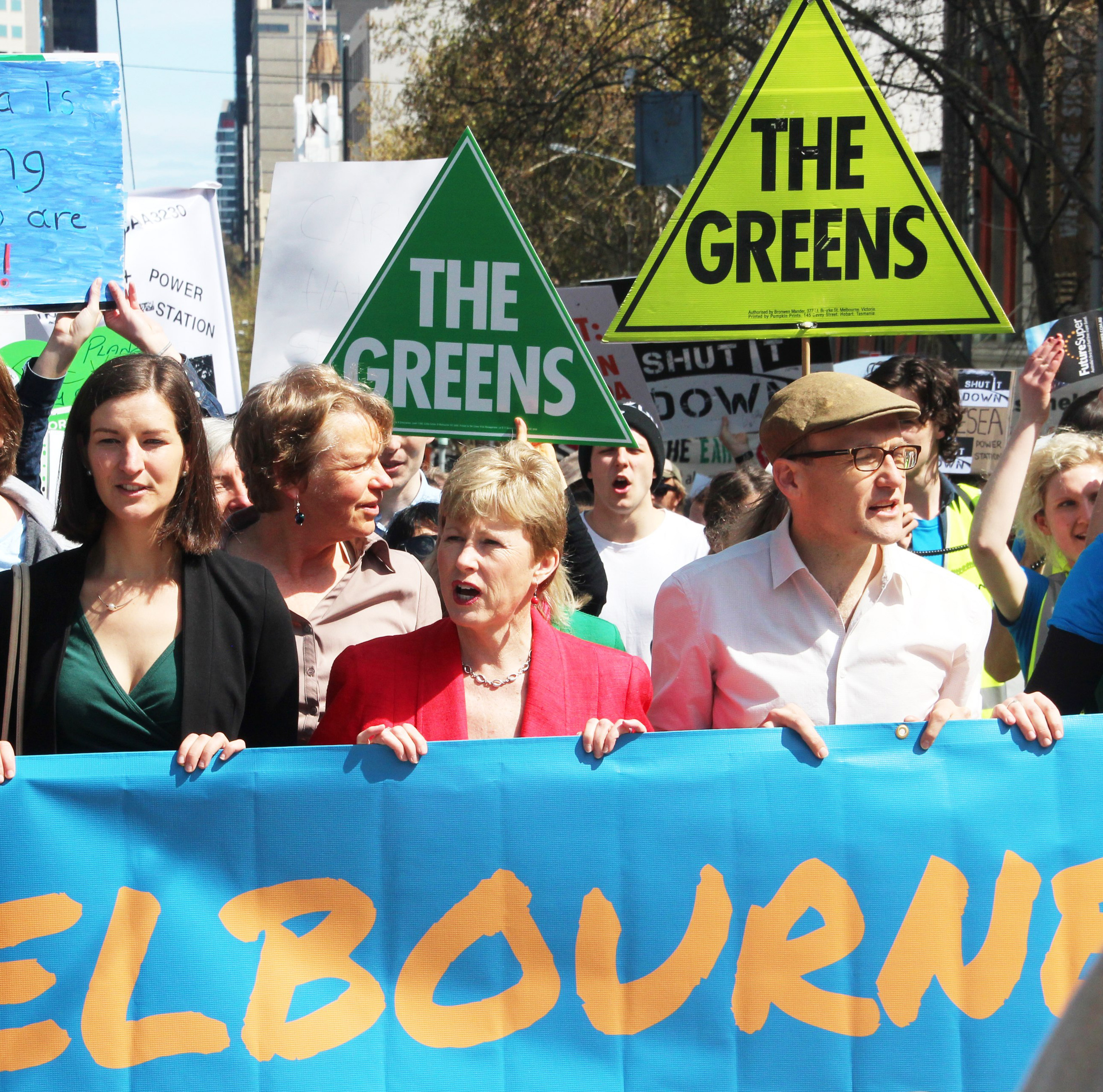
Greens at the People's Climate March in Melbourne, 2014. From left: Ellen Sandell, Janet Rice, Christine Milne and Adam Bandt.

At the 2014 state election, the Victorian Greens won their first seats in the Victorian Legislative Assembly with Ellen Sandell elected in Melbourne and Sam Hibbins in Prahran. The victory in Prahran was the first time that the Greens have won a single member constituency at the state or federal level from the Liberal Party anywhere in Australia. Nina Springle and Samantha Dunn also won two extra Legislative Council Seats giving the party a total of 5 seats in the upper house.

The Greens gained a third seat in the Victorian Legislative Assembly at the 2017 Northcote state by-election, which was won by Lidia Thorpe.

In the 2018 state election, the Greens lost Northcote to Labor MP Kat Theophanous, but they held the seats of Melbourne and Prahran and picked up the seat of Brunswick, retaining 3 seats in the lower house. In the upper house the party suffered a near-wipeout, as its primary vote went slightly backwards and it became the victim of complex preference deals that benefited other minor parties and saw only leader Samantha Ratnam retain her seat.

In the 2022 state election, the Greens retained the seats of Brunswick, Melbourne and Prahran, and gained the seat of Richmond with a 12.9% swing from Labor.

=== Federal elections ===
Federal election results

Victoria primary vote
- 1996: 1.9%
- 1998: 2.1%
- 2001: 5.9%
- 2004: 7.4%
- 2007: 8.2%
- 2010: 12.7%
- 2013: 10.8%
- 2016: 13.8%
- 2019: 11.9%
- 2022: 13.7%
- 2025: 13.6%

Ethicist and animal liberation activist Peter Singer was the lead candidate for the Victorian Greens during the 1996 federal election, in which the Greens polled a total of 1.90% in the House of Representatives and 2.94% in the Senate. Since then the Victorian Greens' vote has grown with 8.17% of the vote in the lower house at the 2007 federal election.

In 2007 Richard Di Natale ran as the lead Victorian Senate candidate and again the Greens narrowly missed out on a quota, with a Senate vote of 10.08%

In 2010 the Greens vote in Victoria rose to 12.66%, a swing of 4.49%. Richard Di Natale was elected to the Senate and Adam Bandt was elected to the Division of Melbourne with a primary vote of 36.17% (56.04% TPP).

At the 2013 federal election Adam Bandt retained his seat of Melbourne and Former Mayor of Maribyrnong City Council, Janet Rice, was elected to the Senate and joined Richard Di Natale to become Victoria's second Greens senator. She won 10.77% of the vote which increased above a quota after distribution of preferences.

At the 2016 federal election Adam Bandt was re-elected to a third term - the Greens also returning one Senator.

At the 2019 federal election Adam Bandt was re-elected to a fourth term, while Janet Rice was also re-elected to the Senate.

At the 2022 federal election, Bandt was again re-elected, and was joined by Lidia Thorpe, who was elected to represent Victoria for the Greens.

At the 2025 federal election, Adam Bandt lost his seat.

== Members of Parliament ==
=== Federal Parliament ===
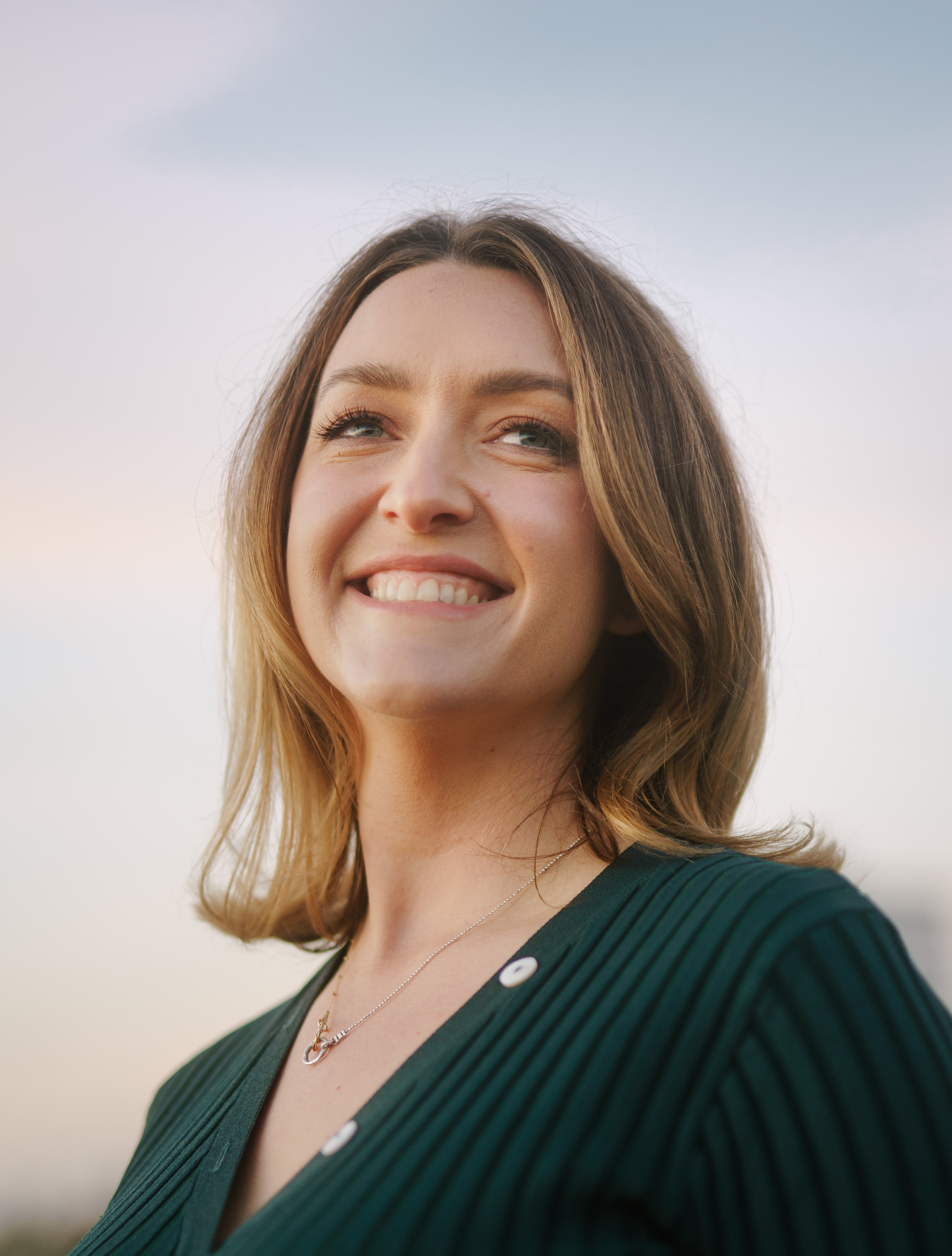
Senator Steph Hodgins-May (2024–present)

==== Former ====
- Senator Richard Di Natale (2011–2020)
- Senator Lidia Thorpe (2020–2023)
- Senator Janet Rice (2014–2024)
- Adam Bandt MP (2010–2025)

=== State Parliament ===
==== Victorian Legislative Assembly ====
Ellen Sandell, MLA for Melbourne (2014–present)

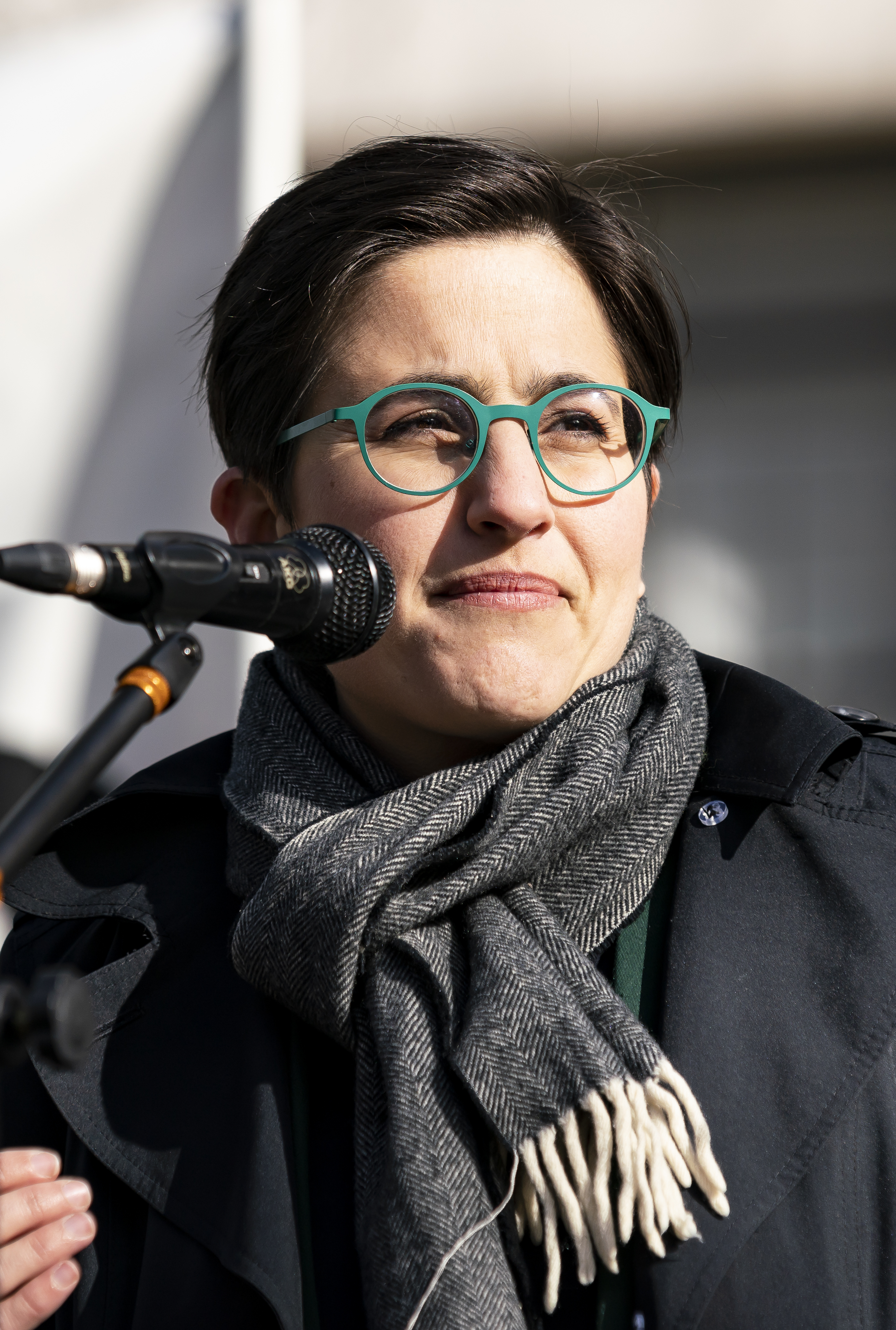
Gabrielle de Vietri, MLA for Richmond (2022–present)

==== Victorian Legislative Council ====
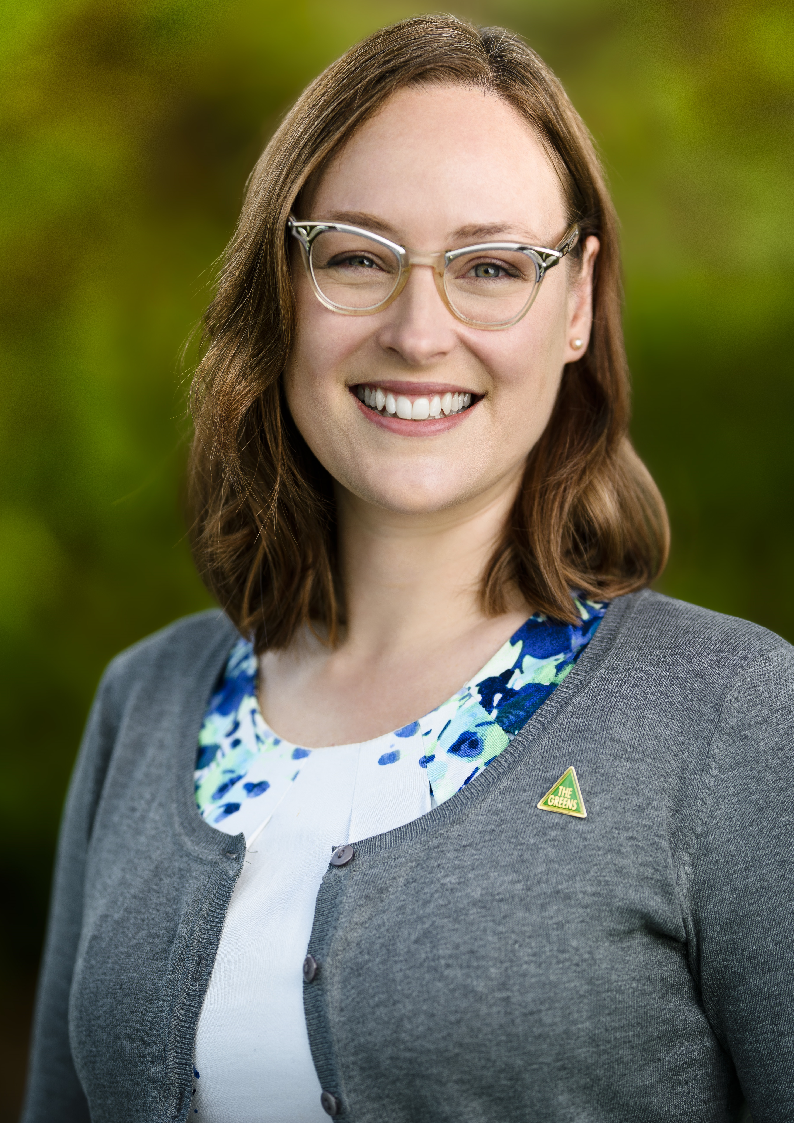
Kat Copsey MLC (2022–present)

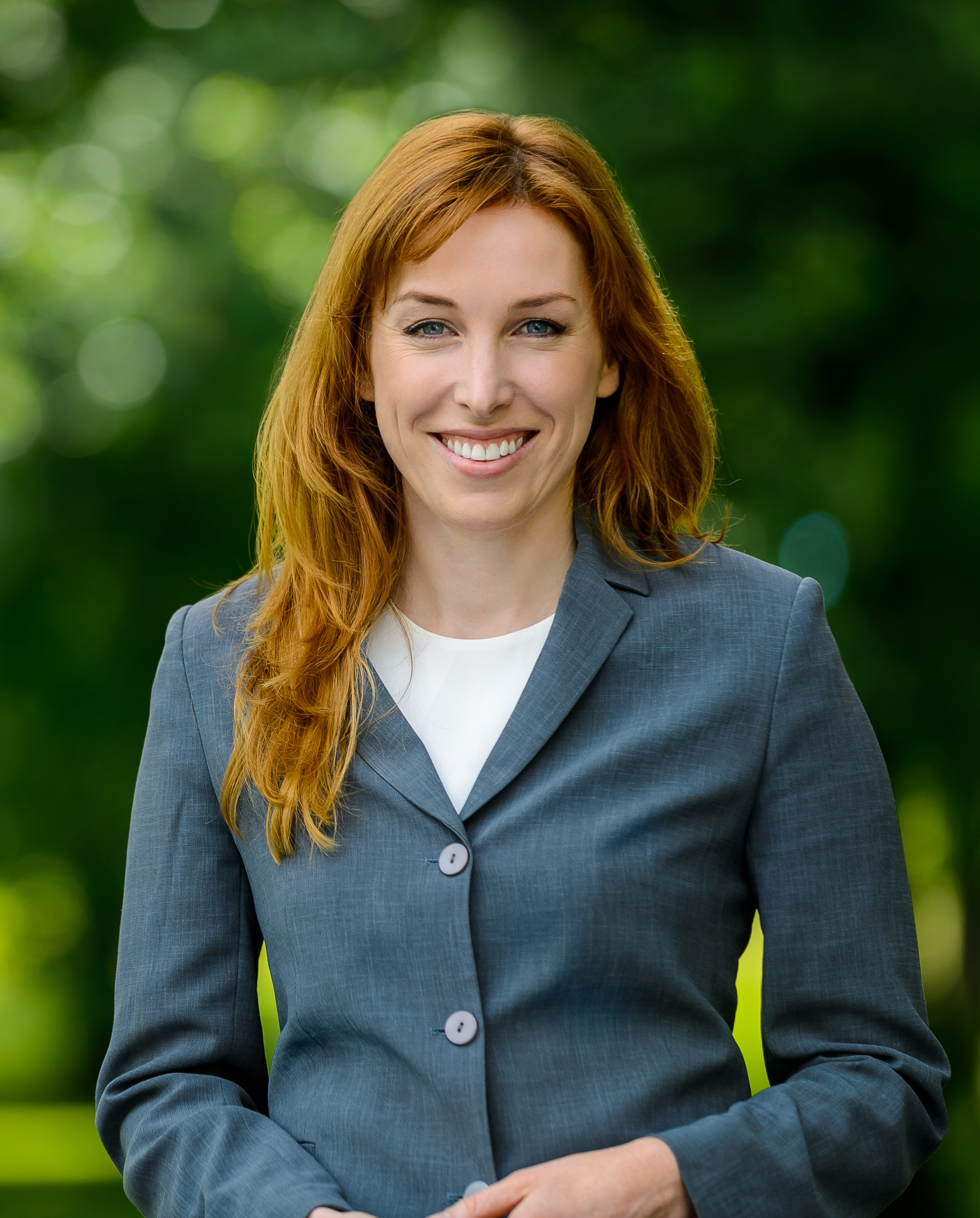
Sarah Mansfield MLC (2022–present)

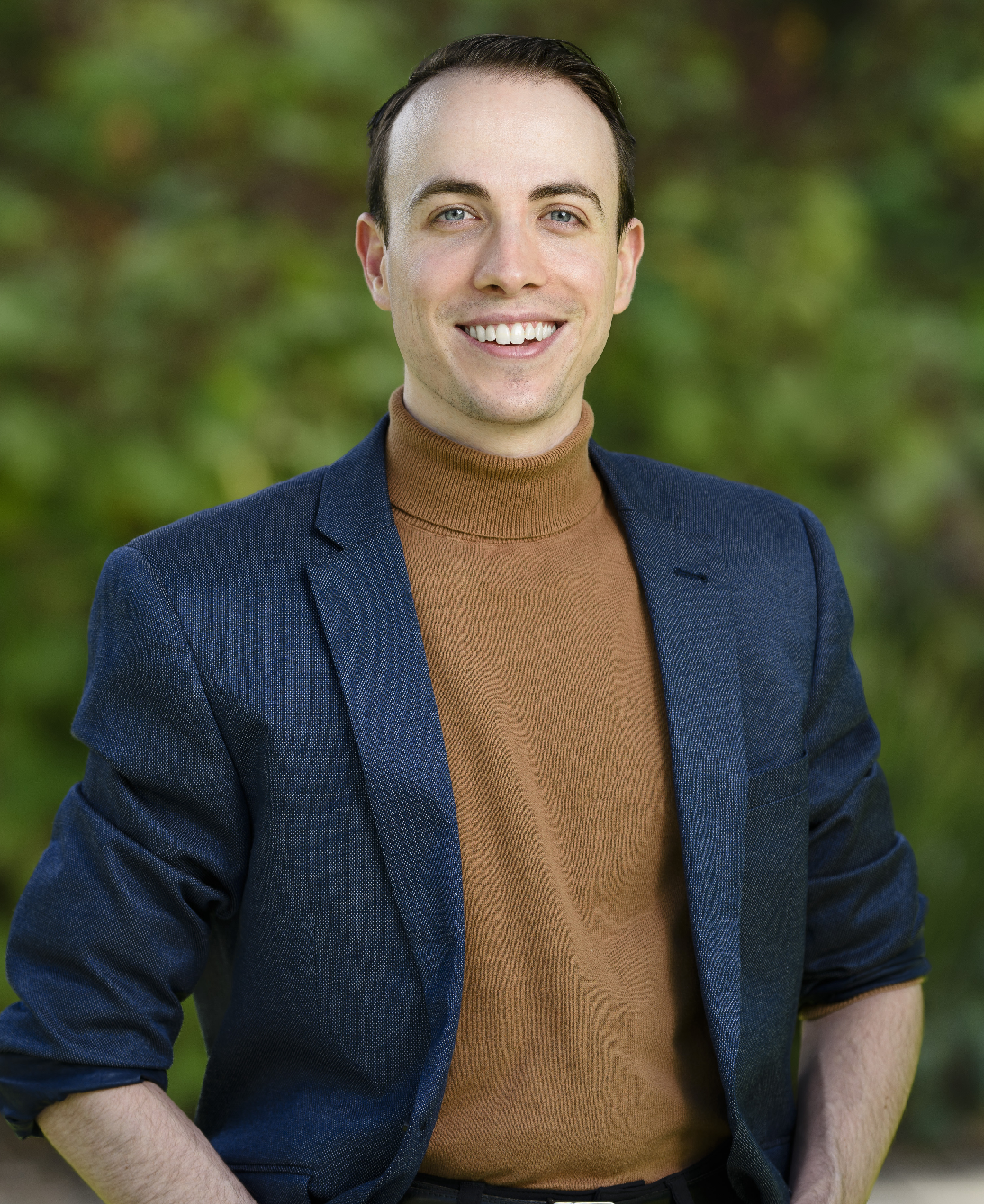
Aiv Puglielli MLC (2022–present)

Anasina Gray-Barberio MLC (2024–present)

==== Former state members ====
- Greg Barber MLC (2006–2017)
- Colleen Hartland MLC (2006–2018)
- Sue Pennicuik MLC (2006–2018)
- Samantha Dunn MLC (2014–2018)
- Nina Springle MLC (2014–2018)
- Huong Truong MLC (2017–2018)
- Lidia Thorpe MLA (2017–2018)
- Sam Hibbins MLA (2014–2024)
- Samantha Ratnam MLC (2017–2024)
- Tim Read MLA (2018–2026)
