= Bronwyn Pike =

Australian politician

The Honourable Bronwyn Pike AM

Victorian Minister for Education (Victoria)
- In office 3 August 2007 – 2 December 2010
- Premier: John Brumby
- Preceded by: John Lenders
- Succeeded by: Martin Dixon

Victorian Minister for Health
- In office 5 December 2002 – 3 August 2007
- Premier: Steve Bracks
- Preceded by: John Thwaites
- Succeeded by: Daniel Andrews

Member of the Victorian Legislative Assembly for Melbourne
- In office 18 September 1999 – 7 May 2012
- Preceded by: Neil Cole
- Succeeded by: Jennifer Kanis

Personal details
- Born: 25 January 1956 (age 70) Tanunda, South Australia, Australia
- Party: Labor
- Education: University of Adelaide
- Profession: Teacher

Bronwyn Jane Pike AM (born 25 January 1956) is an Australian former politician. She was Minister for Education in Victoria in the Brumby Government, and was the Member of Parliament for Melbourne from 1999 to 2012.

== Early life ==
Prior to entering Parliament, Pike worked as a teacher, a community services manager and as the Director of the Unit of Justice and Social Responsibility in the Uniting Church. She is also a former Board Director of Greenpeace Australia.

Pike has a son, Paul Coats, who is a former University of Melbourne Postgraduate Association President and an active socialist.

== Political career ==
Pike entered politics in 1999, at age 43. She was appointed the Minister for Housing and Aged Care and Minister Assisting the Health Minister in the government of Steve Bracks. In 2002 she was appointed as Minister for Community Services and Minister Assisting the Premier on Community Building.

In May 2007, Pike became the longest-serving female minister in Victoria's history, along with Lynne Kosky.

Pike announced her resignation from parliament on 7 May 2012 which triggered a Melbourne by-election. Labor retained the seat, with Jennifer Kanis narrowly defeating the Greens candidate, Cathy Oke.

=== Minister for Health ===
Following the re-election of the Bracks government in late 2002, Pike was promoted to Minister for Health.

=== Minister for Education ===
On 2 August 2007, newly-appointed Premier John Brumby announced a cabinet reshuffle, which moved Pike from Minister for Health to Minister for Education.

Pike spearheaded the $1.9 billion Victorian Schools Plan to rebuild and modernise 500 Victorian schools over the four-year term of government. This included upgrades to technology wings; re-equipping science class rooms; building new schools in growth corridors. A key focus of this rebuilding program is encouraging joint-use of school and community facilities in areas ranging from libraries to sports fields. By 2011 more than 900 schools will have been rebuilt or modernised. The program has been tarnished by use of tactics to force school councils to vote for closure or merger of small schools by threatening to limit funds to the minimum amount as well as other tactics.

== Later career ==
Among her positions since she left politics, Bronwyn Pike is the Chair of UnitingCare Australia and serves on the board of Uniting NSW and ACT. She is a lifelong member of the Uniting Church.

== Honours ==
In 2022, Pike was appointed as a Member of the Order of Australia (AM) in the 2022 Australia Day Honours for "significant service to social welfare and not-for-profit organisations, and to the Parliament of Victoria".

Victorian Legislative Assembly
Preceded by Neil Cole	Member for Melbourne; 1999–2012	Succeeded by Jennifer Kanis
Political offices
Preceded by Robert Knowles	Minister for Aged Care; 1999–2001	Ministry renamed
Preceded by Ann Henderson	Minister for Housing; 1999–2002	Succeeded by Candy Broad
New ministry	Minister for Senior Victorians; 2001–2002	Succeeded by Christine Campbell as Minister for Aged Care
Preceded by Christine Campbell	Minister for Community Services; 2002	Succeeded by Sherryl Garbutt
Preceded by John Thwaites	Minister for Health; 2002–2007	Succeeded by Daniel Andrews
Preceded by John Lenders	Minister for Education (Victoria); 2007–2010	Succeeded by Martin Dixon
Preceded by Jacinta Allan	Minister for Skills and Workplace Participation; 2010	Succeeded by Peter Hall as Minister for Higher Education and Skills
