= Keith Remington =

Australian politician (1923–2020)

Member of the Victorian Legislative Assembly for Melbourne
- In office 17 December 1977 – 29 August 1988
- Preceded by: Barry Jones
- Succeeded by: Neil Cole

Personal details
- Born: Keith Henry Remington; 29 April 1923 Williamstown, Victoria, Australia
- Died: 23 March 2020 (aged 96)
- Party: Labor Party
- Spouse: Shirley May Roland (m. 1951)
- Occupation: Bank manager

Military service
- Allegiance: Australia
- Branch/service: Australian Army
- Years of service: 1942–1946
- Rank: Corporal
- Unit: 14th/32nd Battalion

Keith Henry Remington (29 April 1923 – 23 March 2020) was an Australian politician.

Born and educated in Williamstown, Remington joined the Australian Imperial Force in 1944, during World War II, where he was assigned to the 14th/32nd Battalion and served in New Guinea before being discharged as a Corporal in 1946. Following the war, Remington worked as a bank manager for ANZ, and was treasurer, and later president, of the Bank Employees Union.

He was involved in politics at the local government level, serving as a councillor for the City of Doncaster & Templestowe from 1966 to 1972, and as the city's mayor from 1969 to 1970. He unsuccessfully ran as a Labor candidate for the seat of Box Hill in the 1973 state election. He was elected to the Victorian Legislative Assembly for the seat of Melbourne in a 1977 by-election triggered by the resignation of Barry Jones. He served as the member for Melbourne until he retired before the 1988 state election.

In 2001, Remington was awarded the Centenary Medal for his role in protecting Wilson's Promontory from commercial exploitation.

He died in March 2020 at the age of 96.

Victorian Legislative Assembly
| Preceded by Barry Jones | Member for Melbourne; 1977–1988 | Succeeded by Neil Cole |
