= Berhan Ahmed =

Eritrean-Australian social activist

- Born: 1963 or 1964; Ethiopia
- Education: La Trobe University; University of Melbourne
- Occupation: Social activist
- Years active: 1990s–present

Berhan Ahmed is an Australian social activist. He is the chairman of the African Think Tank, and in 2004 was the first immigrant born in Africa to run for an Australian parliamentary office. Ahmed was also presented the 2009 Victorian Australian of the Year award.

== Background ==
Ahmed was born in the Province of Eritrea in Ethiopia. He became a refugee at age 15 during the civil war and fled to Sudan. After attending high school with funding from the UNHCR, he gained a degree in Agricultural Sciences at the University of Alexandria in Egypt.

At the age of 22, Ahmed sought asylum in Australia, eventually settling in Melbourne. He drove a taxi and worked as a tram conductor, while earning a master's degree in Animal Science at La Trobe University. Ahmed worked for a decade at the CSIRO, and also gained a PhD in forest sciences at the University of Melbourne. He was latterly a senior research fellow at the Department of Forest and Ecosystem Science, and retains an honorary appointment at the university.

== Scholarly contributions ==
Ahmed's research concerns termite taxonomy and their effects on crops, trees, and wood products. He has developed termite distribution and taxonomies, and contributed to an integrated termite pest management (IPM) system. Termites' own engineering can also inform better water and soil management by government, industry and the public. For the protection of infrastructure from wood boring termites, Ahmed has contributed to the development of the impermeable Granitgard technology, now included in the current Australian Standard (AS 3660.1 – 2000) for the protection of new and existing buildings.

== Political and community work ==
Ahmed, originally a member of the Labor Party, ran for the Senate in 2004 for the Greens. He left that party soon afterwards.

Ahmed received four percent of the primary vote as an independent candidate for the 2012 Melbourne state by-election.

In 2012, Ahmed ran for the Mayor of the City of Melbourne, polling 2.45%. Robert Doyle was elected mayor.

Ahmed was president of and a candidate for Voice for the West, a short-lived micro party that ran candidates in the 2014 Victorian state election, without electing any.

Ahmed is the chairman of the Victoria-based Africa Think Tank, which serves migrant and refugee communities from Africa. He is involved in public advocacy on cultural issues, racism and human rights.

== Awards ==
- 2009 Victorian Australian of the Year award, in recognition of Ahmed's humanitarian work.
