= David Moore (Australian politician) =

Australian businessman and politician

David Moore (4 February 1824 – 11 July 1898) was an Australian businessman and politician, member of the Victorian Legislative Assembly.

Moore was born in Sydney, son of Captain Joseph Moore, merchant, and Ann, née Bailey. After working in the Sydney firm of William Walker & Co., where his father was a partner, Moore moved to Melbourne in 1851. There he established the merchant firm Moore, Hawthorn & Co., (later Moore & Company). Moore was appointed a director of the Melbourne board of the Bank of New South Wales in April 1854.

Moore was elected to the first Victorian Legislative Assembly as one of the four members for Melbourne in October 1856. Moore held that seat until August 1859. Moore unsuccessfully contested Sandridge in August 1862, but was elected to that seat in November 1864 and held it until December 1867.

Moore was President of the Board Land & Works in the second Haines ministry from 29 April 1857 to 10 March 1858.
