= Neil Cole (politician) =

Australian politician

Member of the Victorian Parliament for Melbourne
- In office 1 October 1988 – 24 August 1999
- Preceded by: Keith Remington
- Succeeded by: Bronwyn Pike

Personal details
- Born: 25 May 1957 (age 69) Millicent, South Australia
- Party: Labor Party
- Occupation: Playwright and researcher
- Profession: Lawyer

Neil Donald Cole (born 25 May 1957) is an Australian playwright, researcher and former politician.

== Early life ==
Neil Cole was born in Millicent, South Australia, he spent his early years in Malaysia where his father was a service policeman stationed at RAAF Butterworth in Penang. He returned to South Australia and spent four years at primary school until at age 10. He then moved to Melbourne Victoria. The family moved into the housing commission high-rise flats in North Melbourne where Cole attended Flemington High School, and Kyneton High School in 1974 where he was Dux of the School. In 1980, he graduated with a law degree from the University of Melbourne, and in the same year, founded the Flemington Community Legal Service where he worked as a community lawyer for seven years.

== Political career ==
Cole first entered politics at a local level, serving on the Melbourne City Council for three years from 1985 to 1988.

He was elected to the Victorian parliament in October 1988 for the seat of Melbourne. In this time he was the Chair of the Parliamentary Economic and Budget Review Committee under the Government of John Cain and Joan Kirner. Upon the Labor Government losing office, he became the Shadow Attorney-General.

In 1993, he was diagnosed with manic-depressive disorder (noew called bipolar mood disorder) something he had unknowingly been suffering with since his teens. In 1995, after having stood down as Shadow-Attorney General he publicly declared that he had mental illness. He was the first politician in Australia to admit to having a mental illness. Following the revelation of his illness, Cole was re-elected as MLA for Melbourne in the 1996 election, with an increased majority, that he had a mental illness did not go against him at all, a win he described as the "most gratifying thing" in his parliamentary career. His political career ended in 1999, when he lost preselection.

== Writing career ==
Since leaving politics, Cole has written thirty-six plays, which have been performed all over Australia, three times at the Edinburgh Festival and once in Chicago with readings of his plays taking place at The Actors Guild Theatre in New York. His first play, Alive at Williamstown Pier, won the Griffin Award for New Australian Playwriting in 1999. It was shortlisted for the Victorian Premier's Literary Award in 2001.

He won the Aspire Award from the Supreme Court of Victoria for his work on psychiatry in the theatre in 2017. In 2001 he was awarded the Centenary Medal for service to Australian society and literature. He has written two fictional books "Colonel Surry's Insanity" and "Trials and Tribulations in Community Law." He has also published a memoir "Stability in Mind."

== Academic career ==
Cole was an associate professor at the Monash University School of Medicine from 2005 until 2008. He was a member of the National Advisory Council on Mental Health from 2008 to 2011.

Neil is based at the Florey Institute of Neuroscience and Mental Health where he has been since 2008 working with Prof. Colin masters on raising money, awareness and supporting research into Alzheimer's disease. His major research work is exploring the link between creativity and mental illness. He has produced and written 'Into the Limelight," a creative project making videos, theatre productions, and supporting people who have Schizophrenia for over twenty years.

Victorian Legislative Assembly
Preceded by Keith Remington	Member for Melbourne; 1988–1999	Succeeded by Bronwyn Pike
