= Ellen Sandell =

Australian politician (born 1984)

Ellen Sandell MP
- Campaign portrait, 2026

Leader of the Victorian Greens
- Incumbent
- Assumed office 23 April 2024
- Deputy: Sarah Mansfield
- Preceded by: Samantha Ratnam

Deputy leader of the Victorian Greens
- In office 17 December 2018 – 23 April 2024
- Leader: Samantha Ratnam
- Preceded by: Nina Springle
- Succeeded by: Sarah Mansfield

Member of the Victorian Legislative Assembly for Melbourne
- Incumbent
- Assumed office 29 November 2014
- Preceded by: Jennifer Kanis

Personal details
- Born: 26 November 1984 (age 41) Alice Springs, Northern Territory, Australia
- Party: Victorian Greens
- Spouse: Lloyd Davies
- Education: University of Melbourne
- Website: https://ellensandell.com/

Ellen Sandell (born 26 November 1984) is an Australian politician and environmentalist. She has represented the electorate of Melbourne in the Parliament of Victoria since 2014 as a member of the Victorian Greens and been the party's leader since April 2024.

She was a recipient of the Young Environmentalist of the Year Award in 2009 and director of the Australian Youth Climate Coalition between 2011 and 2012.

== Early life ==
Sandell was born in Alice Springs, Northern Territory. She and her family moved to Mildura, Victoria, when she was five years old. She attended Sacred Heart Primary School and St Joseph's College, Mildura.

Sandell went on to study at the University of Melbourne, graduating in 2008 with a Bachelor of Arts (majoring in Spanish and linguistics) and a Bachelor of Science (majoring in genetics). She joined the Australian Youth Climate Coalition in 2007, and became director in 2011.

== Career ==
Whilst at university, Sandell became involved in student politics and was elected as the environment officer for the University of Melbourne Student Union in 2007. From 2007 to 2009, she was employed as a policy adviser in the Victorian Department of Premier and Cabinet, working on the Brumby Labor Government's climate change strategy and Green Paper.

Sandell worked for the Australian Youth Climate Coalition (AYCC) between 2009 and 2012, serving as general manager before becoming the group's National Director. After departing the AYCC, Sandell worked as the ACT Greens campaign manager for Simon Sheikh's unsuccessful Senate campaign in the 2013 Australian federal election. In 2013, she was preselected as the Australian Greens candidate for the seat of Melbourne at the 2014 state elections.

== Political career ==
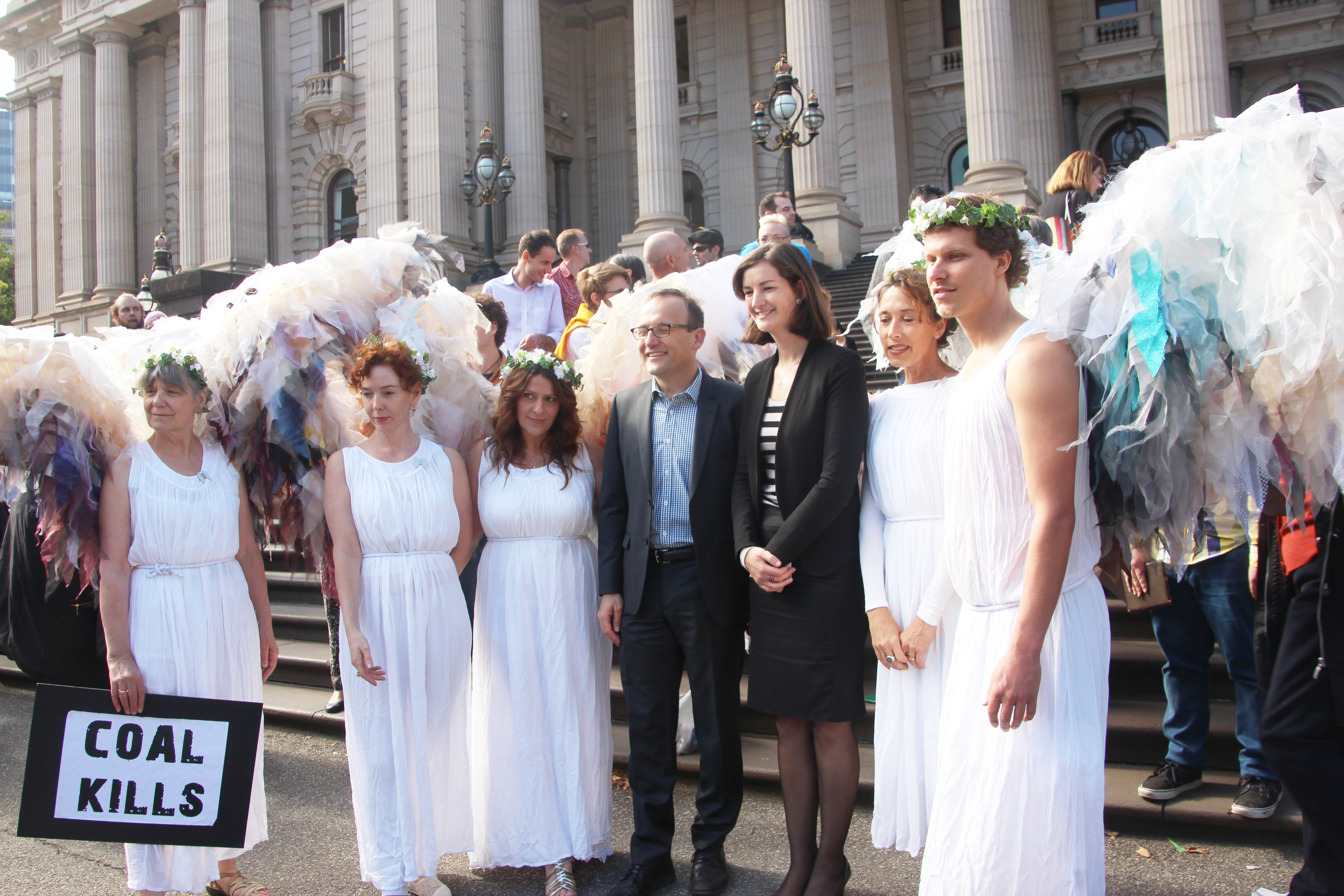
Sandell and Adam Bandt attending a 2015 protest calling for the closure of Hazelwood Power Station

Sandell went on to win the seat of Melbourne at the 2014 election, defeating the Labor incumbent, Jennifer Kanis. She held the seat against the same Labor opponent at the 2018 election, with a slightly smaller margin. Following that election, Sandell was appointed deputy leader of a reduced Greens party-room in the Victorian Parliament, serving with leader Samantha Ratnam.

== Political positions ==
To combat the housing crisis, Sandell supports an immediate freeze of rent increases. As Leader of the Victorian Greens, she helped ban rental bidding, improve minimum energy standards for new rental leases, and extend the required notice for eviction or rent hikes.

Sandell supported the Statewide Treaty Act 2025 and condemns 'the past and ongoing harms caused by the state and by colonisation.' She has supported raising the age of criminal responsibility to 14, reforming bail laws, reducing mass incarceration, and removing the offence of public drunkenness in Victoria, which she argues disproportionately harms First Nations communities.

== Personal life ==
Sandell has three children. She lives in Kensington.

Victorian Legislative Assembly
Preceded by Jennifer Kanis	Member for Melbourne; 2014–present	Incumbent
Party political offices
Preceded by Samantha Ratnam	Leader of the Victorian Greens; 2024–present	Incumbent
