= Tom Hayes (Australian politician) =

Australian politician

Minister-in-Charge of Housing and Materials
- In office 17 December 1952 – 31 March 1955
- Premier: John Cain
- Preceded by: Ivan Swinburne
- Succeeded by: John Sheehan

Member of the Victorian Legislative Assembly for Melbourne
- In office 26 June 1924 – 22 April 1955
- Preceded by: Alexander Rogers
- Succeeded by: Arthur Clarey

Personal details
- Born: 22 February 1890 Ararat, Victoria
- Died: 19 February 1967 (aged 76) Warrandyte, Victoria, Australia
- Resting place: Coburg Cemetery
- Party: Labor Party
- Other political affiliations: Australian Labor Party (Anti-Communist); Democratic Labor Party
- Spouse: Margaret Ann Lynch (m. 1915)
- Occupation: Railway worker

Thomas Hayes (22 February 1890 – 19 February 1967) was an Australian politician. He was the Labor Party member for Melbourne in the Victorian Legislative Assembly from 1924 to 1955.

Hayes was born in Ararat, Victoria to an Irish railway worker, Patrick Hayes, and his wife Sarah. He was educated at St Mary's School, and then followed his father into the railway industry, joining the Ararat branch of Victorian Railways, and was later transferred to Melbourne. During the early 1920s, he was president of the shunters section and later the transportation sections of the Australian Railways Union.

At the 1924 state election, he was elected to the seat of Melbourne for the Labor Party. He was also a councillor on the Melbourne City Council from 1939 to 1965. When the government of John Cain took office in December 1952, Hayes was appointed to the Cain Ministry as Minister-in-Charge of Housing and the associated portfolio of Minister-in-Charge of Materials.

In March 1955, Hayes left the ALP in the 1955 split and joined the Australian Labor Party (Anti-Communist)—relinquishing his ministerial portfolio to John Sheehan. He was defeated in the 1955 state election, but remained active in the Democratic Labor Party, serving as deputy leader in Victoria in 1961.

Victorian Legislative Assembly
Preceded by Alexander Rogers	Member for Melbourne; 1924–1955	Succeeded by Arthur Clarey
Political offices
Preceded by Ivan Swinburne	Minister-in-Charge of Housing and Materials; 1952–1955	Succeeded by John Sheehan
