= Jennifer Kanis =

Australian politician

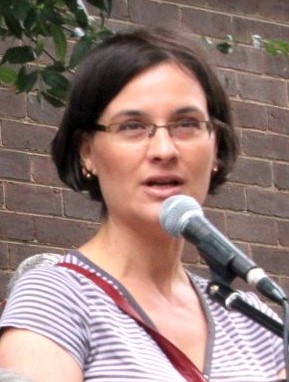
- Kanis in 2012

Member of the Victorian Legislative Assembly for Melbourne
- In office 21 July 2012 – 29 November 2014
- Preceded by: Bronwyn Pike
- Succeeded by: Ellen Sandell

Personal details
- Born: 16 April 1970 (age 56) Melbourne, Victoria, Australia
- Party: Labor
- Spouse: Davydd Griffiths
- Children: None
- Education: University of Melbourne; La Trobe University
- Occupation: Lawyer
- Profession: Lawyer

Jennifer Kanis (born 16 April 1970) is an Australian lawyer and a former politician.

Kanis was born in Melbourne to migrant parents—a Greek father and Italian mother. She studied an Arts degree at the University of Melbourne, and also gained postgraduate qualifications in education. She worked as an English and literature teacher, and then enrolled to study industrial law at La Trobe University.

After graduation, she took a job with Holding Redlich—the law firm founded by former Victorian Labor leader Clyde Holding—and became a senior associate of the firm.

In 2008, she was elected to Melbourne City Council.

She was the Labor Party member for Melbourne in the Victorian Legislative Assembly between 2012 and 2014.

Victorian Legislative Assembly
| Preceded by Bronwyn Pike | Member for Melbourne; 2012–2014 | Succeeded by Ellen Sandell |
