= Brian Walters =

Australian barrister (born 1954)

Brian Walters AM SC
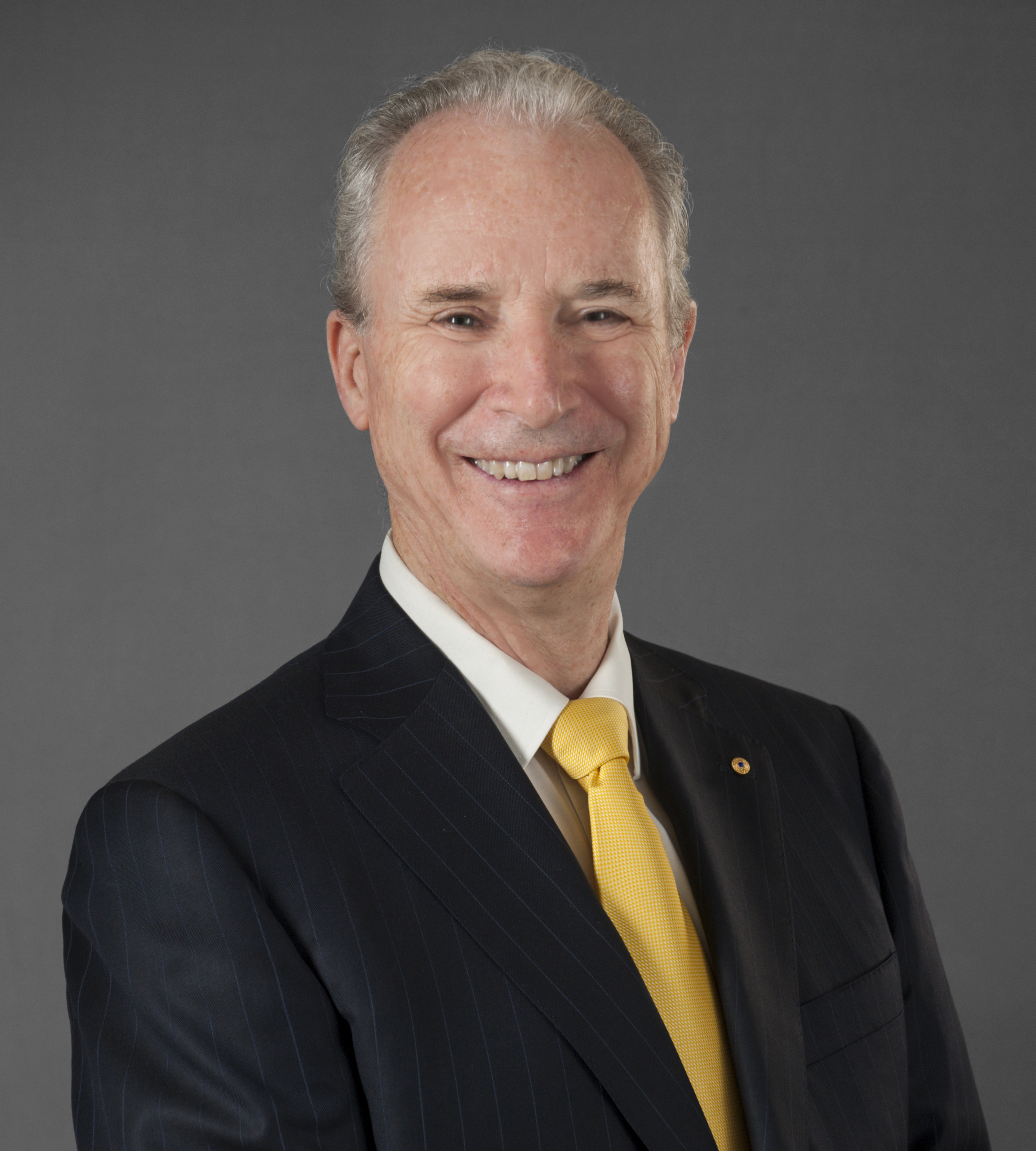
- Walters c. 2020
- Born: 17 June 1954 (age 72); Melbourne, Victoria, Australia
- Occupations: Barrister; writer; activist
- Political party: Australian Greens

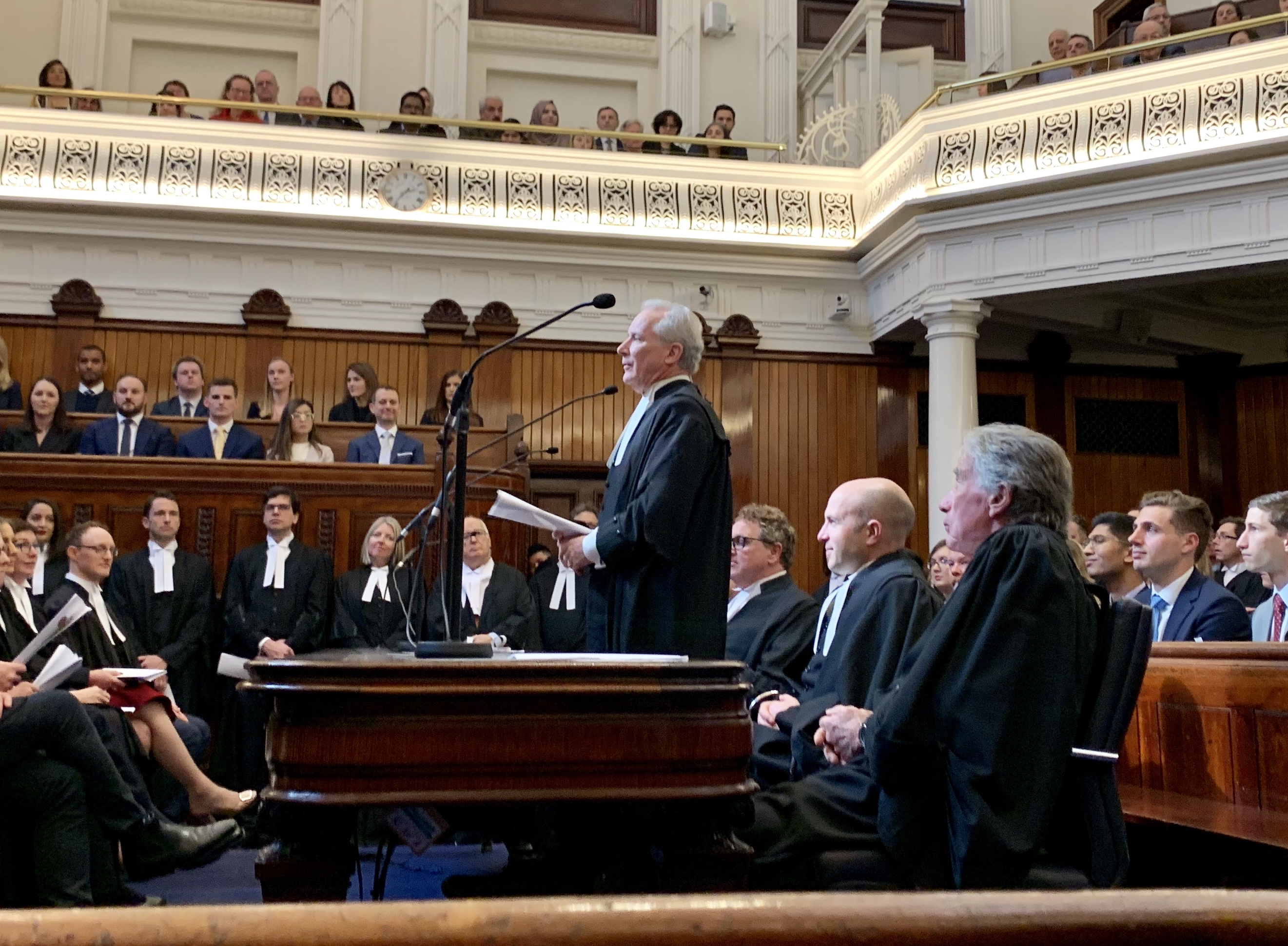
Walters, addressing a full courtroom in Melbourne, 2019

Brian Walters AM SC (born 17 June 1954) is a Melbourne barrister, writer and advocate for human rights and the environment.

== Career ==
In 1999 Walters advised journalist Alan Gray in relation to his book Forest Friendly Building Timbers after the National Association of Forest Industries threatened to sue because it criticised logging practices. He subsequently joined the committee of Free Speech Victoria, becoming its Vice President and Spokesperson.

In 2006-7 Walters led the legal team that took the case of Stefan Nystrom to the United Nations Human Rights Committee. On 18 July 2011 the Committee found in favour of Nystrom, who had been deported from Australia. It ruled that, even though Nystrom was a Swedish citizen, Australia was his "own country" under international human rights law.

In 2009–10 Walters led the legal team that successfully sued the South Australian government for assaults and false imprisonment perpetrated by South Australian police against protesters at the Beverley Uranium Mine in 2000 (White v South Australia).

He was the Australian Greens candidate for the state seat of Melbourne in the 2010 Victorian state election.

In 2015–2016 Walters led the legal team that successfully argued in the Federal Court that the Tasmanian government could not open four wheel drive tracks through the Western Tasmanian Aboriginal Cultural Landscape (the Tarkine Tracks case).

In 2016–2017 Walters led the legal team that successfully challenged a series of decisions by the Andrews Victorian government to hold children in an adult prison (the "Barwon case").

In 2017 Walters led the legal team appearing for former Greens parliamentarians in the case before the High Court relating to dual citizenship of parliamentarians (the s 44 case – Re Canavan & Ors).

In the 2017 Australia Day Honours list Walters was made a Member of the Order of Australia (AM) "for significant service to conservation through environmental protection law, and to human rights advocacy in Victoria."

In 2018-20 he led the Australian arm of the team acting for Torres Strait Islanders in their case before the United Nations Human Rights Committee concerning Australia’s violation of their human rights by inaction on climate change.

== Bibliography ==
- Slapping on the Writs: Defamation, Developers and Community Activism, Brian Walters. University of South Wales Press, 2003. ISBN 0-86840-463-2.
- TREASON: Claus von Stauffenberg and the Plot to Kill Hitler, Brian Walters, 2021 Treason, ISBN 978-0-9924690-3-0
- Angels, like laundry, Brian Walters, Angels, like laundry 2019 Make Books Australia, ISBN 978-0-9924690-2-3
- Brink, Brian Walters, Brink 2020 Make Books Australia, ISBN 978-0-9924690-7-8
- Mothlight, Brian Walters, Mothlight 2022 Make Books Australia ISBN 978-1-922889-00-3
