= Electoral district of Melbourne =

State electoral district of Victoria, Australia

Melbourne Victoria—Legislative Assembly
- Interactive map of electoral district boundaries from the 2022 state election
- State: Victoria
- Dates current: 1856–1859; 1889–present
- MP: Ellen Sandell
- Party: Greens
- Namesake: Melbourne
- Electors: 54,533 (2022)
- Area: 25 km^{2} (9.7 sq mi)
- Demographic: Central Metropolitan
- Coordinates: 37°48′14″S 144°56′28″E
Electorates around Melbourne:
Essendon	Brunswick	Brunswick
Footscray	Melbourne	Richmond
Footscray	Albert Park	Prahran

The electoral district of Melbourne is an electorate of the Victorian Legislative Assembly. It currently includes the localities of Docklands, Carlton, Melbourne, East Melbourne, West Melbourne, North Melbourne, Parkville, Newmarket, Kensington and Flemington, and includes Melbourne University. The district has been in existence since 1856 (it was abolished in 1859 and reestablished in 1889).

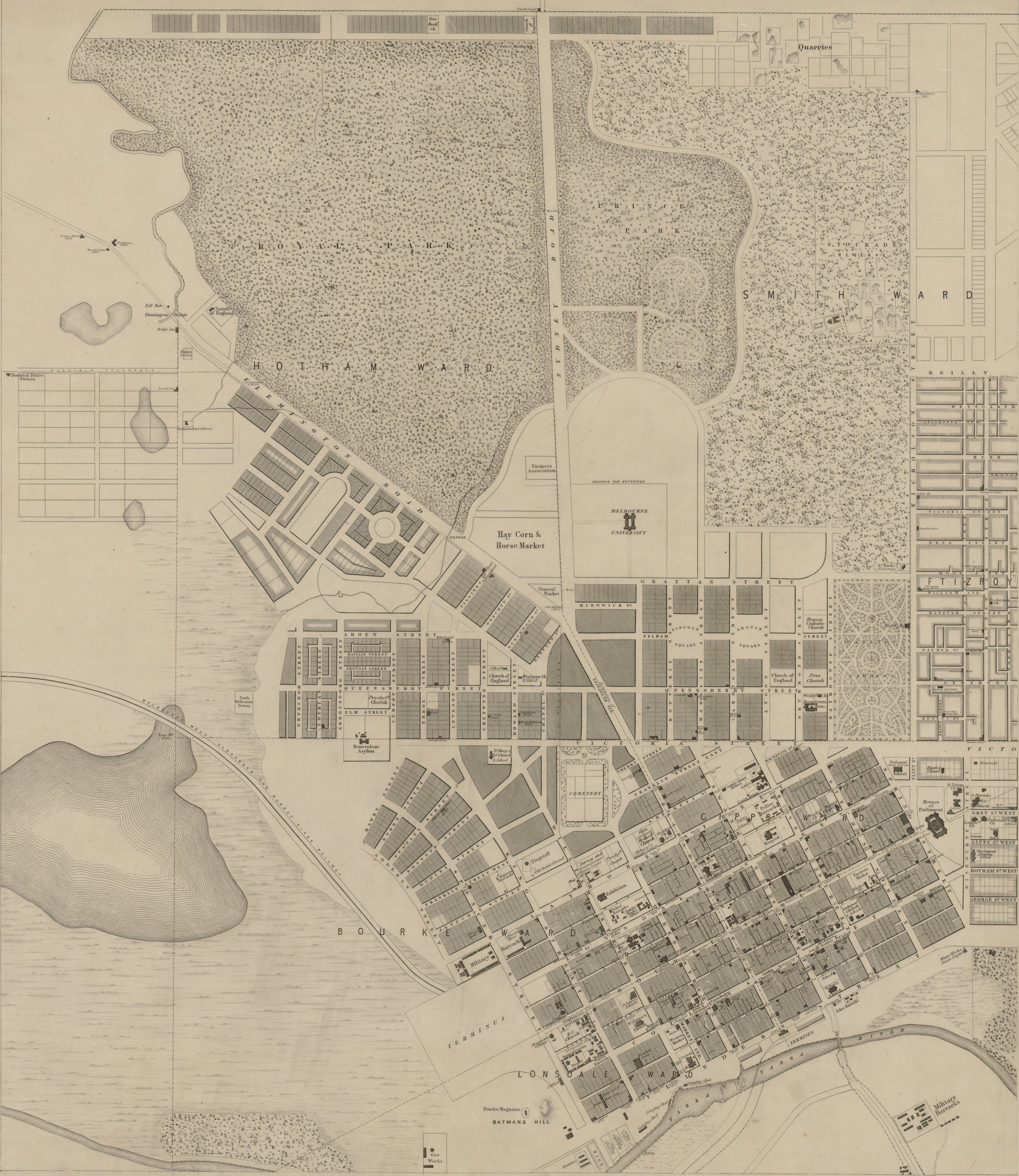
Melbourne, 1855

The electorate was won in 2014 for the first time by Greens candidate Ellen Sandell.

== History ==
Melbourne was one of the inaugural districts of the first Assembly in 1856. Its area was defined by the 1855 Act as:

Commencing at a Point in the Yarra Yarra River due South from the South-western Angle of Gisborne Street, thence to Gisborne Street, and by the Western Side of that Street to Victoria Parade, thence by the South Side of Victoria Parade to the Western Side of Nicholson Street, thence by the said Western Side of Nicholson Street Northwards to the Boundary Line of the Corporate Limits of Melbourne, thence by the last-mentioned Boundary Line bearing West to the Moonee Ponds, by the said Moonee Ponds downwards to the Site of Main’s Bridge,^{[a]} thence by a Line bearing South to the Yarra Yarra River, and on the South by the Yarra Yarra River to the commencing Point.

^{a} now Flemington Bridge

Melbourne was abolished in 1859, its area was split into the new electoral districts of East Melbourne and West Melbourne, each having two members.

Melbourne was re-created as a single-member electorate by the Electoral Act Amendment Act 1888 which took effect at the 1889 elections.

Since 1908 the seat had been traditional Labor territory since 1908, but had become increasingly marginal against the Greens since 2002. Senior Labor minister Bronwyn Pike successfully held the seat against strong Greens challenges at three subsequent elections, defeating future Greens Senator Richard Di Natale in 2002 and 2006, and prominent lawyer Brian Walters in 2010. Pike resigned in 2012, and Labor candidate and City of Melbourne councillor Jennifer Kanis retained the seat after a closely contested by-election, which saw her finish second on primary votes to Greens candidate Cathy Oke but win on preferences. Kanis lost the seat to Greens candidate Ellen Sandell at the 2014 election. Along with the seat of Prahran it was the first win for the Greens in the Victorian Legislative Assembly.

== Members ==
First incarnation (1856–1859, 5 members)
Member 1	Party	Term	Member 2	Party	Term	Member 3	Party	Term	Member 4	Party	Term	Member 5	Party	Term
Archibald Michie	None	1856–1859	David Moore	None	1856–1859	John Smith	None	1856–1859	William Stawell	None	1856–1857	John O'Shanassy^{#}	None	1856
Archibald Michie	None	1856–1859	David Moore	None	1856–1859	John Smith	None	1856–1859	James Service	None	1857–1859	Henry Langlands	None	1857–1859

Second incarnation (1889–present, 1 member)
Member	Party	Term
Godfrey Carter	None	1889–1900
Edward Findley	Labour	1900–1901
James Boyd	Ministerialist	1901–1908
Alexander Rogers	Labor	1908–1924
Tom Hayes	Labor	1924–1955
Tom Hayes	Labor (Anti-Communist)	1955–1955
Arthur Clarey	Labor	1955–1972
Barry Jones	Labor	1972–1977
Keith Remington	Labor	1977–1988
Neil Cole	Labor	1988–1999
Bronwyn Pike	Labor	1999–2012
Jennifer Kanis	Labor	2012–2014
Ellen Sandell	Greens	2014–present

== Election results ==
2022 Victorian state election: Melbourne
Party	Candidate	Votes	%	±%
Greens	Ellen Sandell	15,855	37.3	−1.3
Labor	Rebecca Thistleton	13,033	30.6	−5.1
Liberal	George Palackalody	7,522	17.7	+0.3
Victorian Socialists	Colleen Bolger	2,323	5.5	+5.5
Reason	Nicola Foxworthy	1,601	3.8	0.0
Animal Justice	Rabin Bangaar	701	1.6	−0.3
Family First	Michael Janson	535	1.3	+1.3
Freedom	Steven J. Smith	521	1.2	+1.2
Ind. (Indigenous)	Laylah Al-Saimary	428	1.0	+1.0
Total formal votes		42,519	96.6	+1.3
Informal votes		1,485	3.4	−1.3
Turnout		44,004	80.7	+0.1
Notional two-party-preferred count
Labor	Rebecca Thistleton	31,895	75.0	+0.6
Liberal	George Palackalody	10,624	25.0	−0.6
Two-candidate-preferred result
Greens	Ellen Sandell	25,593	60.2	+8.5
Labor	Rebecca Thistleton	16,926	39.8	−8.5
Greens hold		Swing	+8.5	

== Historical maps ==
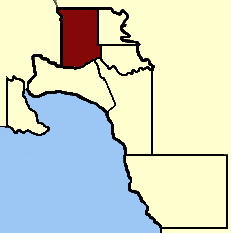
Location of Melbourne district in 1856

== Notes ==
^# O'Shanassy won both Melbourne and Kilmore districts, he decided to represent the latter resulting in a by-election for Melbourne.
