= Electoral results for the district of Northcote =

Victoria, Australia, district election results

This is a list of electoral results for the Electoral district of Northcote in Victorian state elections.

== Members for Northcote ==
Member	Party	Term
John Cain	Labor	1927–1957
Frank Wilkes	Labor	1957–1988
Tony Sheehan	Labor	1988–1998
Mary Delahunty	Labor	1998 by–2006
Fiona Richardson	Labor	2006–2017
Lidia Thorpe	Greens	2017 by–2018
Kat Theophanous	Labor	2018–present

== Election results ==
=== Elections in the 2020s ===
==== 2022 ====
2022 Victorian state election: Northcote
Party	Candidate	Votes	%	±%
Labor	Kat Theophanous	17,303	40.6	−1.1
Greens	Campbell Gome	12,797	30.0	−9.5
Liberal	Stewart Todhunter	5,205	12.2	+1.5
Victorian Socialists	Kath Larkin	2,776	6.5	+6.5
Reason	April Clarke	1,539	3.6	+0.2
Animal Justice	Tim Oseckas	757	1.8	−0.7
Freedom	Anastacia Ntouni	729	1.7	+1.7
Liberal Democrats	Anthony Cave	530	1.2	+0.1
Independent	Adrian Whitehead	518	1.2	+1.2
Family First	Kathrine Ashton	408	0.9	+0.9
Independent	Ashish Verma	80	0.2	+0.2
Total formal votes		42,642	94.5	−1.1
Informal votes		2,445	5.4	+1.1
Turnout		45,087	89.5	+0.4
Notional two-party-preferred count
Labor	Kat Theophanous	34,840	81.7	−1.5
Liberal	Stewart Todhunter	7,802	18.3	+1.5
Two-candidate-preferred result
Labor	Kat Theophanous	21,413	50.2	−1.5
Greens	Campbell Gome	21,229	49.8	+1.5
Labor hold		Swing	−1.5	

=== Elections in the 2010s ===
==== 2018 ====
2018 Victorian state election: Northcote
Party	Candidate	Votes	%	±%
Labor	Kat Theophanous	17,748	41.71	+0.73
Greens	Lidia Thorpe	16,816	39.52	+3.24
Liberal	John MacIsaac	4,570	10.74	−5.74
Reason	Franca Smarrelli	1,448	3.40	+3.40
Animal Justice	David Bramante	1,026	2.41	+0.67
Liberal Democrats	Samuel Fink	500	1.18	+1.18
Independent	Bryony Edwards	444	1.04	+0.21
Total formal votes		42,552	95.70	−0.08
Informal votes		1,911	4.30	+0.08
Turnout		44,463	91.05	−0.61
Notional two-party-preferred count
Labor	Kat Theophanous	35,417	83.23	+3.41
Liberal	John MacIsaac	7,135	16.77	−3.41
Two-candidate-preferred result
Labor	Kat Theophanous	22,004	51.71	−4.33
Greens	Lidia Thorpe	20,548	48.29	+4.33
Labor gain from Greens		Swing	−4.33	

==== 2017 by-election ====
Northcote state by-election, 2017
Party	Candidate	Votes	%	±%
Greens	Lidia Thorpe	16,319	45.2	+8.9
Labor	Clare Burns	12,779	35.4	−5.6
Independent	Vince Fontana	1,864	5.2	+5.2
Liberal Democrats	Dean Rossiter	1,497	4.1	+4.1
Independent Reason	Laura Chipp	1,152	3.2	+3.2
Animal Justice	Nina Lenk	773	2.1	+0.4
Independent	Philip Cooper	436	1.2	+1.2
Independent	Russell Hayward	360	1.0	+1.0
Independent	Joseph Toscano	331	0.9	+0.9
Independent	Nevena Spirovska	215	0.6	+0.6
Independent	Brian Sanaghan	208	0.6	+0.6
Save The Planet	Bryony Edwards	54	0.4	−0.4
Total formal votes		36,088	94.9	−0.9
Informal votes		1,940	5.1	+0.9
Turnout		38,028	79.0	−12.6
Two-candidate-preferred result
Greens	Lidia Thorpe	20,137	55.6	+11.6
Labor	Clare Burns	16,080	44.4	−11.6
After distribution of preferences
Greens	Lidia Thorpe	18,380	50.9	N/A
Labor	Clare Burns	14,410	39.9	N/A
Independent	Vince Fontana	3,298	9.1	N/A
Greens gain from Labor		Swing	+11.6	

The VEC stops distributing preferences when a candidate reaches over 50 per cent of the vote. An indicative two-candidate-preferred count had Lidia Thorpe (Greens) on 20,137 votes (55.6%) to Clare Burns (Labor) on 16,080 votes (44.4%)—a swing of 11.6 percentage points to the Greens.

==== 2014 ====
2014 Victorian state election: Northcote
Party	Candidate	Votes	%	±%
Labor	Fiona Richardson	15,928	41.0	−3.1
Greens	Trent McCarthy	14,101	36.3	+4.4
Liberal	Anthony D'Angelo	6,407	16.5	−3.2
The Basics Rock 'n' Roll	Jamie McCarney	1,043	2.7	+2.7
Animal Justice	Georgina Purcell	678	1.7	+1.7
Family First	Helen Fenn	390	1.0	+1.0
Independent	Bryony Edwards	324	0.8	+0.8
Total formal votes		38,871	95.8	−0.0
Informal votes		1,713	4.2	+0.0
Turnout		40,584	91.7	+2.1
Notional two-party-preferred count
Labor	Fiona Richardson	31,027	79.8	+4.3
Liberal	Anthony D'Angelo	7,844	20.2	−4.3
Two-candidate-preferred result
Labor	Fiona Richardson	21,783	56.0	−4.2
Greens	Trent McCarthy	17,088	44.0	+4.2
Labor hold		Swing	−4.2	

==== 2010 ====
2010 Victorian state election: Northcote
Party	Candidate	Votes	%	±%
Labor	Fiona Richardson	15,917	44.94	−7.63
Greens	Anne Martinelli	10,927	30.85	+3.44
Liberal	Steve Moran	6,863	19.37	+4.08
Sex Party	Robert Bishop	1,098	3.10	+3.10
Independent	Darren Lewin-Hill	404	1.14	−0.39
Independent	Dominic Marino	213	0.60	+0.60
Total formal votes		35,422	95.76	+0.41
Informal votes		1,567	4.24	−0.41
Turnout		36,989	91.50	+0.97
Notional two-party-preferred count
Labor	Fiona Richardson	26,833	75.9	−4.4
Liberal	Steve Moran	8,525	24.1	+4.4
Two-candidate-preferred result
Labor	Fiona Richardson	21,666	61.23	+2.71
Greens	Anne Martinelli	13,716	38.77	−2.71
Labor hold		Swing	+2.71	

=== Elections in the 2000s ===
==== 2006 ====
2006 Victorian state election: Northcote
Party	Candidate	Votes	%	±%
Labor	Fiona Richardson	17,508	52.6	−2.6
Greens	Alex Bhathal	9,131	27.4	+2.0
Liberal	Graham Watt	5,092	15.3	−1.5
Family First	Daniel Willis	1,065	3.2	+3.2
Independent	Darren Lewin-Hill	511	1.5	+1.5
Total formal votes		33,307	95.3	−0.5
Informal votes		1,625	4.7	+0.5
Turnout		34,932	90.5	
Notional two-party-preferred count
Labor	Fiona Richardson	26,737	80.3	+2.0
Liberal	Graham Watt	6,562	19.7	−2.0
Two-candidate-preferred result
Labor	Fiona Richardson	19,484	58.5	+0.6
Greens	Alex Bhathal	13,813	41.5	−0.6
Labor hold		Swing	+0.6	

==== 2002 ====
2002 Victorian state election: Northcote
Party	Candidate	Votes	%	±%
Labor	Mary Delahunty	18,229	55.2	−11.2
Greens	Sarah Nicholson	8,394	25.4	+25.4
Liberal	Graham Watt	5,550	16.8	−9.2
Socialist Alliance	Jackie Lynch	598	1.8	+1.8
Citizens Electoral Council	Paul Gallagher	260	0.8	+0.8
Total formal votes		33,031	95.8	−0.1
Informal votes		1,434	4.2	+0.1
Turnout		34,465	91.4	
Notional two-party-preferred count
Labor	Mary Delahunty	25,857	78.3	+5.7
Liberal	Graham Watt	7,157	21.7	−5.7
Two-candidate-preferred result
Labor	Mary Delahunty	19,103	57.9	−14.7
Greens	Sarah Nicholson	13,892	42.1	+42.1
Labor hold		Swing	−14.7	

=== Elections in the 1990s ===
==== 1999 ====
1999 Victorian state election: Northcote
Party	Candidate	Votes	%	±%
Labor	Mary Delahunty	20,681	66.1	+6.5
Liberal	Elizabeth Richardson	8,124	26.0	−2.2
Independent	Susanna Duffy	2,480	7.9	+7.9
Total formal votes		31,285	96.0	−0.2
Informal votes		1,306	4.0	+0.2
Turnout		32,591	91.3	
Two-party-preferred result
Labor	Mary Delahunty	22,733	72.7	+2.8
Liberal	Elizabeth Richardson	8,552	27.3	−2.8
Labor hold		Swing	+2.8	

==== 1998 by-election ====
1998 Northcote state by-election
Party	Candidate	Votes	%	±%
Labor	Mary Delahunty	16,954	60.0	+0.4
Democrats	Kern Saunders	7,439	26.3	+26.3
One Nation	Nikolas Kavalenka	1,690	6.0	+6.0
Greens	Gurm Sekhon	1,081	3.8	+3.8
Independent	Denis Evans	555	2.0	+2.0
Independent	Maurice Sibelle	472	1.7	+1.7
Abolish Child Support	Abboud Haidar	75	0.3	+0.3
Total formal votes		28,266	95.4	−0.8
Informal votes		1,373	4.6	+0.8
Turnout		29,639	85.2	
Two-candidate-preferred result
Labor	Mary Delahunty	18,351	65.0	−4.9
Democrats	Kern Saunders	9,891	35.0	+35.0
Labor hold		Swing	−4.9	

==== 1996 ====
1996 Victorian state election: Northcote
Party	Candidate	Votes	%	±%
Labor	Tony Sheehan	18,550	59.6	+4.5
Liberal	Alex Hay	8,783	28.2	+0.4
Independent	Greg Barber	2,421	7.8	+7.8
Independent	Jonathan Hogge	823	2.6	+2.6
Natural Law	Michael Dickins	554	1.8	+0.2
Total formal votes		31,131	96.2	+3.2
Informal votes		1,238	3.8	−3.2
Turnout		32,369	92.8	
Two-party-preferred result
Labor	Tony Sheehan	21,646	69.9	+4.7
Liberal	Alex Hay	9,336	30.1	−4.7
Labor hold		Swing	+4.7	

==== 1992 ====
1992 Victorian state election: Northcote
Party	Candidate	Votes	%	±%
Labor	Tony Sheehan	16,288	55.1	−16.5
Liberal	Nicholas Kotsiras	8,212	27.8	−0.6
Independent	Carolyn Purdue	2,337	7.9	+7.9
Independent	Frank Ryan	1,228	4.2	+4.2
Natural Law	Michael Dickins	473	1.6	+1.6
Independent	Joe Kenwright	320	1.1	+1.1
Call to Australia	Ken Cook	257	0.9	+0.9
Independent	John Graham	236	0.8	+0.8
Independent	Dimitrios Karmis	201	0.7	+0.7
Total formal votes		29,552	93.0	+0.1
Informal votes		2,234	7.0	−0.1
Turnout		31,786	93.8	
Two-party-preferred result
Labor	Tony Sheehan	19,213	65.2	−6.5
Liberal	Nicholas Kotsiras	10,271	34.8	+6.5
Labor hold		Swing	−6.5	

=== Elections in the 1980s ===
==== 1988 ====
1988 Victorian state election: Northcote
Party	Candidate	Votes	%	±%
Labor	Tony Sheehan	17,900	71.67	−0.17
Liberal	Ross Lane	7,075	28.33	+0.17
Total formal votes		24,975	93.10	−2.41
Informal votes		1,851	6.90	+2.41
Turnout		26,826	89.73	−1.02
Labor hold		Swing	−0.17	

==== 1985 ====
1985 Victorian state election: Northcote
Party	Candidate	Votes	%	±%
Labor	Frank Wilkes	19,120	71.8	−2.8
Liberal	William Hamilton	7,495	28.2	+2.8
Total formal votes		26,615	95.5	
Informal votes		1,252	4.5	
Turnout		27,867	90.8	
Labor hold		Swing	−2.8	

==== 1982 ====
1982 Victorian state election: Northcote
Party	Candidate	Votes	%	±%
Labor	Frank Wilkes	19,113	73.5	+3.3
Liberal	Gerard Clarke	6,898	26.5	−0.2
Total formal votes		26,011	95.5	−0.4
Informal votes		1,217	4.5	+0.4
Turnout		27,228	92.6	+1.9
Labor hold		Swing	+1.6	

=== Elections in the 1970s ===
==== 1979 ====
1979 Victorian state election: Northcote
Party	Candidate	Votes	%	±%
Labor	Frank Wilkes	17,897	70.2	+6.0
Liberal	Lilian Heath	6,821	26.7	−9.1
Independent	Ian Hughes	793	3.1	+3.1
Total formal votes		25,511	95.9	−0.4
Informal votes		1,103	4.1	+0.4
Turnout		26,614	90.7	0.0
Two-party-preferred result
Labor	Frank Wilkes	18,336	71.9	+7.7
Liberal	Lilian Heath	7,175	28.1	−7.7
Labor hold		Swing	+7.7	

==== 1976 ====
1976 Victorian state election: Northcote
Party	Candidate	Votes	%	±%
Labor	Frank Wilkes	16,809	64.2	+5.8
Liberal	Gillford Brown	9,388	35.8	+4.6
Total formal votes		26,197	96.3	
Informal votes		1,002	3.7	
Turnout		27,199	90.7	
Labor hold		Swing	+4.3	

==== 1973 ====
1973 Victorian state election: Northcote
Party	Candidate	Votes	%	±%
Labor	Frank Wilkes	13,438	58.7	−2.3
Liberal	Michael Galli	6,990	30.6	+30.6
Democratic Labor	Albert Dowsey	2,448	10.7	−28.3
Total formal votes		22,876	95.8	+1.6
Informal votes		1,013	4.2	−1.6
Turnout		23,889	93.4	−0.4
Two-party-preferred result
Labor	Frank Wilkes	13,805	60.3	−0.7
Liberal	Michael Galli	9,071	39.7	+0.7
Labor hold		Swing	−0.7	

==== 1970 ====
1970 Victorian state election: Northcote
Party	Candidate	Votes	%	±%
Labor	Frank Wilkes	13,061	61.0	+6.9
Democratic Labor	Albert Dowsey	8,338	39.0	+23.2
Total formal votes		21,399	94.3	−1.9
Informal votes		1,287	5.7	+1.9
Labor hold		Swing	+4.5	

=== Elections in the 1960s ===
==== 1967 ====
1967 Victorian state election: Northcote
Party	Candidate	Votes	%	±%
Labor	Frank Wilkes	12,121	54.1	+0.7
Liberal	Peter Falconer	6,748	30.1	−0.2
Democratic Labor	John Little	3,527	15.8	−0.5
Total formal votes		22,396	96.2	
Informal votes		877	3.8	
Turnout		23,273	94.7	
Two-party-preferred result
Labor	Frank Wilkes	12,650	56.5	+0.8
Liberal	Peter Falconer	9,746	43.5	−0.8
Labor hold		Swing	+0.8	

==== 1964 ====
1964 Victorian state election: Northcote
Party	Candidate	Votes	%	±%
Labor	Frank Wilkes	9,973	56.0	−1.0
Liberal and Country	Max Crellin	4,772	26.8	+8.7
Democratic Labor	John Little	3,061	17.2	−7.7
Total formal votes		17,806	96.6	−0.2
Informal votes		617	3.4	+0.2
Turnout		18,423	94.7	−0.2
Two-party-preferred result
Labor	Frank Wilkes	10,432	58.6	−2.1
Liberal and Country	Max Crellin	7,374	41.4	+2.1
Labor hold		Swing	−2.1	

==== 1961 ====
1961 Victorian state election: Northcote
Party	Candidate	Votes	%	±%
Labor	Frank Wilkes	10,551	57.0	−2.9
Democratic Labor	Thomas Walsh	4,620	24.9	+1.7
Liberal and Country	Julian Sullivan	3,349	18.1	+1.1
Total formal votes		18,520	96.8	−1.2
Informal votes		614	3.2	+1.2
Turnout		19,134	94.9	+0.9
Two-party-preferred result
Labor	Frank Wilkes	11,244	60.7	−2.6
Liberal and Country	Julian Sullivan	7,276	39.3	+2.6
Labor hold		Swing	−2.6	

- The two candidate preferred vote was not counted between the Labor and DLP candidates for Northcote.

=== Elections in the 1950s ===
==== 1958 ====
1958 Victorian state election: Northcote
Party	Candidate	Votes	%	±%
Labor	Frank Wilkes	11,980	59.9	
Democratic Labor	Thomas Walsh	4,631	23.1	
Liberal and Country	Edward Wells	3,394	17.0	
Total formal votes		20,005	98.0	
Informal votes		414	2.0	
Turnout		20,419	94.0	
Two-candidate-preferred result
Labor	Frank Wilkes	12,674	63.3	
Democratic Labor	Thomas Walsh	7,331	36.7	
Labor hold		Swing		

==== 1957 ====
1957 Northcote state by-election
Party	Candidate	Votes	%	±%
Labor	Frank Wilkes	8,347	56.6	−4.3
Liberal and Country	Frederick Capp	3,243	22.0	−0.6
Democratic Labor	Thomas Walsh	3,158	21.4	+4.9
Total formal votes		14,748	98.1	−0.2
Informal votes		281	1.9	+0.2
Turnout		15,029	84.5	−8.2
Labor hold		Swing	N/A	

- Preferences were not distributed.

==== 1955 ====
1955 Victorian state election: Northcote
Party	Candidate	Votes	%	±%
Labor	John Cain	10,655	60.9	
Liberal and Country	Neil McDay	3,953	22.6	
Labor (A-C)	David Woodhouse	2,890	16.5	
Total formal votes		17,498	98.3	
Informal votes		294	1.7	
Turnout		17,792	92.7	
Two-party-preferred result
Labor	John Cain	11,089	63.4	
Liberal and Country	Neil McDay	6,409	36.6	
Labor hold		Swing		

==== 1952 ====
1952 Victorian state election: Northcote
Party	Candidate	Votes	%	±%
Labor	John Cain	Unopposed		
Labor hold		Swing	N/A	

==== 1950 ====
1950 Victorian state election: Northcote
Party	Candidate	Votes	%	±%
Labor	John Cain	17,040	70.0	+6.2
Liberal and Country	Thomas Templeton	7,301	30.0	−6.2
Total formal votes		24,341	96.7	+1.2
Informal votes		171	0.7	−1.2
Turnout		24,512	96.7	+1.2
Labor hold		Swing	+6.2	

=== Elections in the 1940s ===
1947 Victorian state election: Northcote
Party	Candidate	Votes	%	±%
Labor	John Cain	15,618	63.8	−36.2
Liberal	Jack McColl	8,853	36.2	+36.2
Total formal votes		24,471	99.0	
Informal votes		248	1.0	
Turnout		24,719	95.5	
Labor hold		Swing	N/A	

1945 Victorian state election: Northcote
Party	Candidate	Votes	%	±%
Labor	John Cain	unopposed		
Labor hold		Swing		

1943 Victorian state election: Northcote
Party	Candidate	Votes	%	±%
Labor	John Cain	unopposed		
Labor hold		Swing		

1940 Victorian state election: Northcote
Party	Candidate	Votes	%	±%
Labor	John Cain	17,184	74.4	+3.0
United Australia	Herbert Rasmussen	5,902	25.6	−3.0
Total formal votes		23,086	98.7	−0.4
Informal votes		304	1.3	+0.4
Turnout		23,390	94.7	−0.1
Labor hold		Swing	+3.0	

=== Elections in the 1930s ===
1937 Victorian state election: Northcote
Party	Candidate	Votes	%	±%
Labor	John Cain	16,513	71.4	+3.7
United Australia	Jonas Holt	6,591	28.6	−3.7
Total formal votes		23,104	99.1	+0.7
Informal votes		216	0.9	−0.7
Turnout		23,320	94.8	−0.9
Labor hold		Swing	+3.7	

1935 Victorian state election: Northcote
Party	Candidate	Votes	%	±%
Labor	John Cain	15,108	67.7	+8.2
United Australia	Fred Edmunds	7,191	32.3	−8.2
Total formal votes		22,299	98.4	−0.5
Informal votes		362	1.6	+0.5
Turnout		22,661	95.7	+2.1
Labor hold		Swing	+8.2	

1932 Victorian state election: Northcote
Party	Candidate	Votes	%	±%
Labor	John Cain	12,945	59.5	−40.5
United Australia	William Olver	8,802	40.5	+40.5
Total formal votes		21,747	98.9	
Informal votes		236	1.1	
Turnout		21,983	93.6	
Labor hold		Swing	N/A	

=== Elections in the 1920s ===
1929 Victorian state election: Northcote
Party	Candidate	Votes	%	±%
Labor	John Cain	unopposed		
Labor hold		Swing		

1927 Victorian state election: Northcote
Party	Candidate	Votes	%	±%
Labor	John Cain	unopposed		
Labor hold		Swing		
