= Post-election pendulum for the 1996 Victorian state election =

The following is a Mackerras pendulum for the 1996 Victorian state election.

"Very safe" seats require a swing of over 20 per cent to change, "safe" seats require a swing of 10 to 20 per cent to change, "fairly safe" seats require a swing of between 6 and 10 per cent, while "marginal" seats require a swing of less than 6 per cent.

Liberal/National seats
Marginal
Ballarat East	Barry Traynor	LIB	0.0%
Oakleigh	Denise McGill	LIB	0.8%
Carrum	David Lean	LIB	0.8%
Ballarat West	Paul Jenkins	LIB	1.4%
Narracan	Florian Andrighetto	LIB	1.6%
Tullamarine	Bernie Finn	LIB	3.0%
Frankston East	Peter McLellan^{[4]}	LIB	3.1%
Geelong	Ann Henderson	LIB	3.5%
Seymour	Marie Tehan	LIB	4.2%
Ripon	Steve Elder	LIB	4.6%
Prahran	Leonie Burke	LIB	4.6%
Mordialloc	Geoff Leigh	LIB	4.7%
Bentleigh	Inga Peulich	LIB	4.7%
Bendigo East	Michael John	LIB	5.0%
Monbulk	Steve McArthur	LIB	5.2%
~~Mitcham~~	~~Roger Pescott^{[2]}~~	~~LIB~~	~~5.3%~~
Berwick	Robert Dean	LIB	5.3%
Bellarine	Garry Spry	LIB	5.5%
Fairly safe
Eltham	Wayne Philips	LIB	6.8%
Bayswater	Gordon Ashley	LIB	7.5%
Gisborne	Tom Reynolds	LIB	7.8%
Knox	Hurtle Lupton	LIB	7.9%
Polwarth	Ian Smith	LIB	8.1%
Dromana	Martin Dixon	LIB	8.1%
Burwood	Jeff Kennett	LIB	8.6%
Cranbourne	Gary Rowe	LIB	9.1%
Bennettswood	Geoff Coleman	LIB	9.2%
Caulfield	Helen Shardey	LIB	9.3%
Safe
South Barwon	Alister Paterson	LIB	10.2%
Box Hill	Robert Clark	LIB	10.3%
Portland	Denis Napthine	LIB	10.4%
Forest Hill	John Richardson	LIB	10.5%
Pakenham	Rob Maclellan	LIB	11.1%
Mornington	Robin Cooper	LIB	11.3%
Mooroolbark	Lorraine Elliott	LIB	12.2%
~~Gippsland West~~	~~Alan Brown~~^{[1]}	~~LIB~~	~~12.6%~~
Evelyn	Jim Plowman	LIB	12.7%
Wantirna	Kim Wells	LIB	13.1%
Hawthorn	Phil Gude	LIB	13.6%
Warrnambool	John McGrath	NAT	13.8%
Warrandyte	Phil Honeywood	LIB	13.9%
Sandringham	Murray Thompson	LIB	14.3%
Bulleen	David Perrin	LIB	14.6%
Benambra	Tony Plowman	LIB	14.9%
Kew	Jan Wade	LIB	15.0%
Doncaster	Victor Perton	LIB	15.0%
Gippsland East	David Treasure	NAT	15.2%
Benalla	Pat McNamara	NAT	15.3%
Frankston	Andrea McCall	LIB	15.4%
Glen Waverley	Ross Smith	LIB	15.7%
Malvern	Robert Doyle	LIB	17.6%
Brighton	Alan Stockdale	LIB	18.1%
Swan Hill	Barry Steggall	NAT	19.0%
Gippsland South	Peter Ryan	NAT	19.4%
Shepparton	Don Kilgour	NAT	19.6%
Very safe
Wimmera	Bill McGrath	NAT	21.2%
Murray Valley	Ken Jasper	NAT	22.4%
Rodney	Noel Maughan	NAT	26.1%

Labor seats
Marginal
Werribee	Mary Douglas	ALP	0.8%
Ivanhoe	Craig Langdon	ALP	1.6%
Yan Yean	Andre Haermeyer	ALP	1.6%
Bendigo West	Bob Cameron	ALP	1.7%
Dandenong North	Jan Wilson	ALP	2.2%
Bundoora	Sherryl Garbutt	ALP	2.6%
Morwell	Keith Hamilton	ALP	2.7%
Dandenong	John Pandazopoulos	ALP	3.3%
Essendon	Judy Maddigan	ALP	3.4%
Niddrie	Rob Hulls	ALP	4.4%
Fairly safe
Springvale	Eddie Micallef	ALP	7.9%
Geelong North	Peter Loney	ALP	8.1%
Altona	Lynne Kosky	ALP	8.2%
Albert Park	John Thwaites	ALP	8.8%
Clayton	Hong Lim	ALP	9.6%
Safe
Mitcham	Tony Robinson^{[2]}	ALP	10.5%
Pascoe Vale	Christine Campbell	ALP	11.1%
Keilor	George Seitz	ALP	11.6%
Melton	David Cunningham	ALP	12.2%
Mill Park	Alex Andrianopoulos	ALP	13.9%
Northcote	Mary Delahunty^{[3]}	ALP	15.0%
Preston	Michael Leighton	ALP	15.3%
Williamstown	Steve Bracks	ALP	15.6%
Melbourne	Neil Cole	ALP	15.9%
Coburg	Carlo Carli	ALP	16.9%
Richmond	Demetri Dollis	ALP	17.3%
Sunshine	Ian Baker	ALP	19.1%
Footscray	Bruce Mildenhall	ALP	19.4%
~~Northcote~~	~~Tony Sheehan~~^{[3]}	~~ALP~~	~~19.9%~~
Very safe
Thomastown	Peter Batchelor	ALP	22.0%
Broadmeadows	John Brumby	ALP	25.1%
Independent & other seats
Gippsland West	Susan Davies^{[1]}	IND v LIB	0.3%
Mildura	Russell Savage	IND v LIB	20.9%

== Notes ==
^{1} In December 1996, the Liberal member for Gippsland West, Alan Brown, resigned. Independent candidate Susan Davies won the resulting by-election on 1 February 1997.
^{2} On 11 November 1997, the Liberal member for Mitcham, Roger Pescott, resigned. Labor candidate Tony Robinson won the resulting by-election on 13 December 1997.
^{3} On 3 July 1998, the Labor member for Northcote, Tony Sheehan, resigned. Labor candidate Mary Delahunty won the resulting state by-election on 15 August 1998.
^{4} The member for Frankston East, Peter McLellan, was elected as a member of the Liberal Party, but resigned on 24 July 1998 and subsequently served out the remainder of his term as an independent.
