= 2018 Batman by-election =

Australian federal by-election

- 17 March 2018

Division of Batman (Vic) in the House of Representatives
- Registered: 111,857
- Turnout: 81.40% ▼8.28
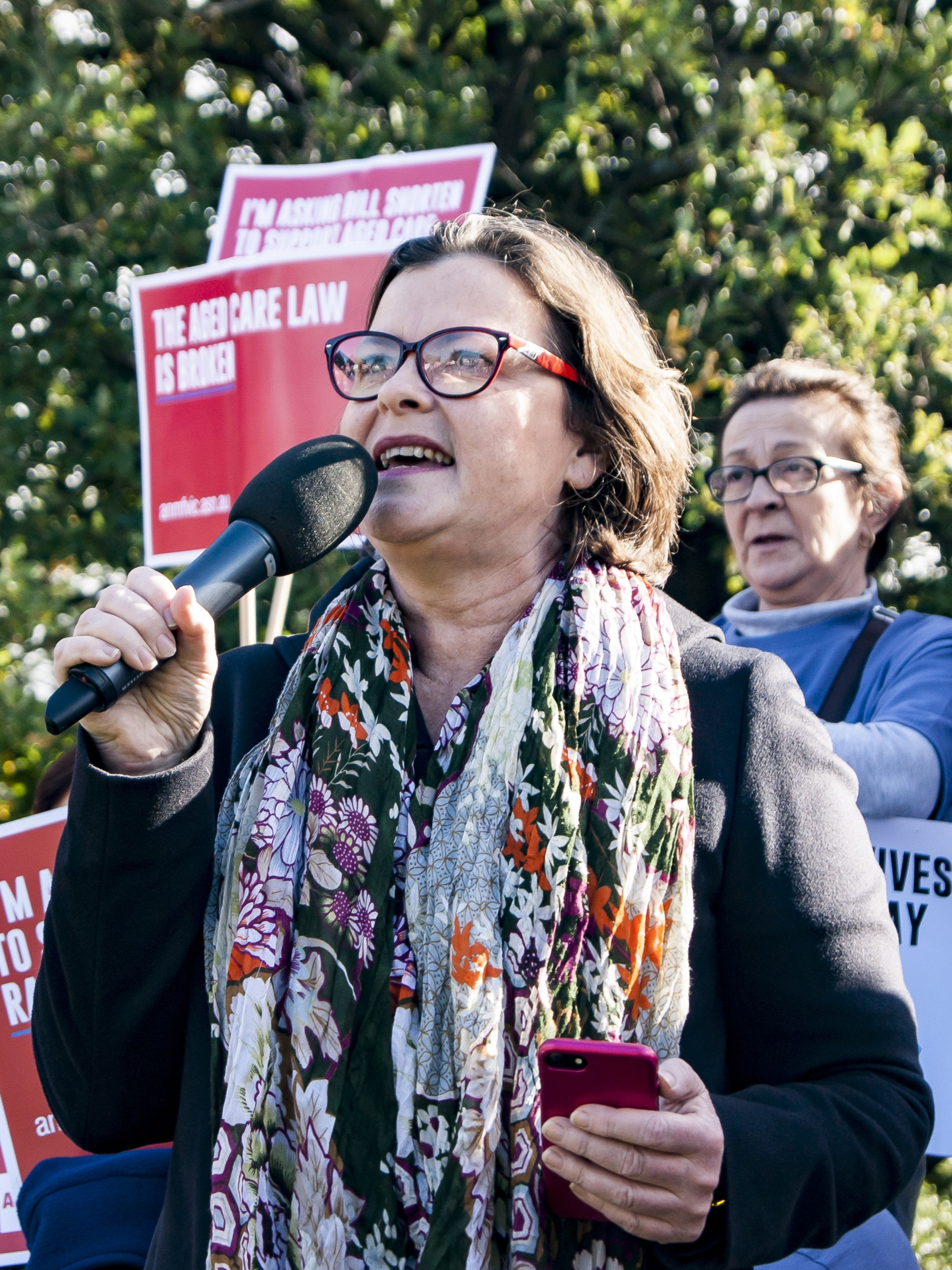

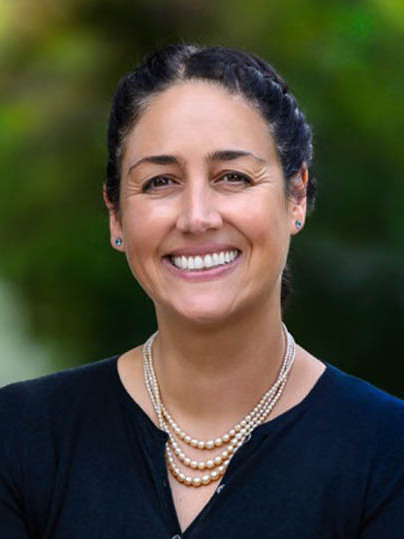
	First party	Second party
Candidate	Ged Kearney	Alex Bhathal
Party	Labor	Greens
Popular vote	36,840	33,725
Percentage	43.14%	39.49%
Swing	▲7.87	▲3.26
TCP	54.38%	45.62%
TCP swing	▲3.35	▼3.35
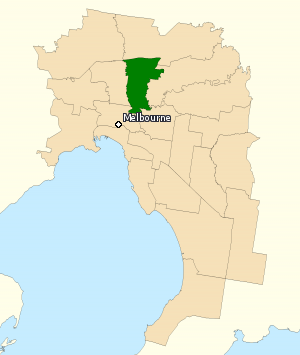
- The Division of Batman covered an area of 66 km^{2} in the northern suburbs of Melbourne. The main suburbs in the seat included Fairfield, Northcote, Preston and Reservoir.
MP before election
David Feeney
Labor
Elected MP
Ged Kearney
Labor

A by-election for the Australian House of Representatives seat of Batman in Melbourne, Victoria, took place on 17 March 2018. The by-election was called as a result of the resignation on 1 February 2018 of the incumbent backbench Australian Labor Party (ALP) Member of Parliament (MP) David Feeney, who resigned amid the 2017–18 Australian parliamentary eligibility crisis.

At the 2016 Australian federal election, the Australian Greens came within one percent of winning the two-candidate preferred vote (TCP). The 2018 campaign was primarily a contest between the Labor candidate former Australian Council of Trade Unions president Ged Kearney and the Greens candidate social worker Alex Bhathal, who had run for the seat five times. The Liberal Party of Australia (LPA; Liberals) declined to field a candidate. The campaign heavily focussed on the proposed Adani Carmichael coal mine and other environmental issues, refugee policy, and Labor's proposed reforms to dividend imputation.

Kearney won the seat with a 3.35% swing toward Labor (TCP), for a total of 54.38% of the after-preferences vote. This was the last election held for the division of Batman: the electorate was abolished in 2019 and replaced with the Division of Cooper, which Kearney won at the 2019, 2022, and 2025 Australian federal elections.

== Background ==
On 6 December 2017, amidst the ongoing citizenship crisis affecting several MPs, the Australian Labor Party (ALP) Member of Parliament (MP) David Feeney announced he was unable to produce documentation confirming he had renounced his citizenship of the United Kingdom. Feeney voluntarily referred himself to the High Court of Australia, considering his likely breach of Section 44 of the Constitution of Australia. By 19 January 2018, Feeney still could not produce any documents from British or Irish authorities saying he had undertaken to renounce his citizenship and entitlements. The High Court granted Feeney's legal team an extension to 1 February to allow them to continue searching for the relevant documents. At a press conference on 1 February, Feeney announced he would resign from the seat and from politics, effective immediately, choosing not to stand as a candidate at the by-election. The by-election was set for 17 March 2018, the same day as the South Australian state election.

Batman had been a solidly Labor seat for the majority of its history. Since its creation in 1906, non-Labor members had represented the electorate for under ten years (1906–1910, 1931–1934, and 1966–1969). The Greens significantly increased their vote share before 2017, including a 9.6% gain in the 2016 federal election that placed them first in the primary vote, and their candidate Alex Bhathal lost to Feeney by two points after preference distribution on the two-candidate-preferred vote (TCP). Bhathal had contested the seat in 2001, 2004, 2010, 2013 and 2016. The growth of the Greens' vote has been attributed to house-price rises and demographic change. The Greens' vote was particularly strong south of Bell Street, Preston, which formed the so-called "hipster-proof fence" or "quinoa curtain".

The Australian Electoral Commission confirmed 111,857 people were enrolled to vote in the by-election. The Liberal Party declined to field a candidate, following weeks of internal discussion. Victorian Liberal president Michael Kroger said in early February that the party would consider the record of Bhathal when deciding to stand a candidate, stating "if we see a hint of anti-semitism we will run". Kroger cited protest against Israeli treatment of Palestinians as a concern, such as support for the Boycott, Divestment and Sanctions movement.

== Campaign ==
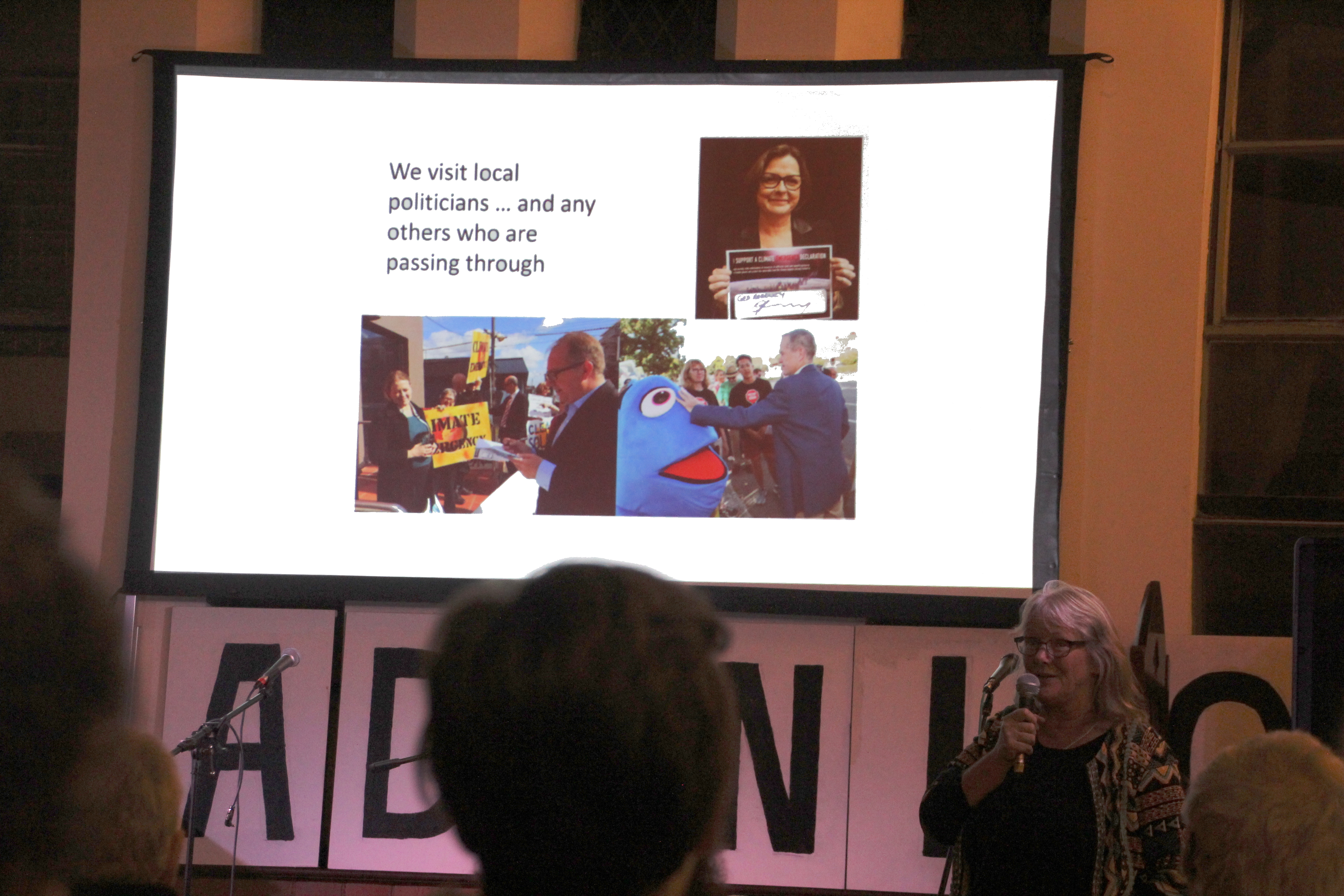
An anti-Adani event held 18 May 2018. The lower-right image depicts Bill Shorten interacting with anti-Adani protesters on polling day at the by-election.

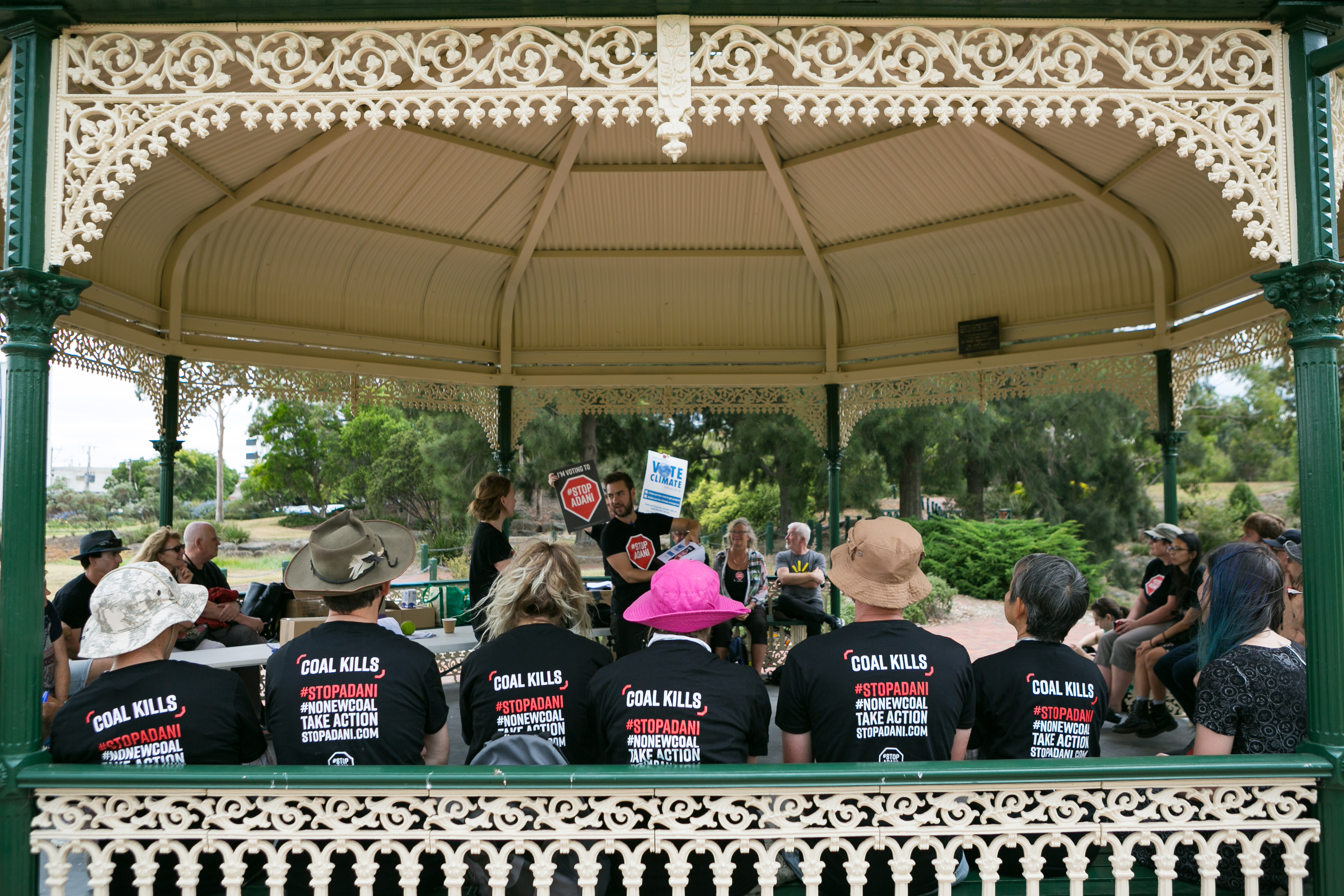
Anti-Adani doorknockers meeting in Batman in February 2018.

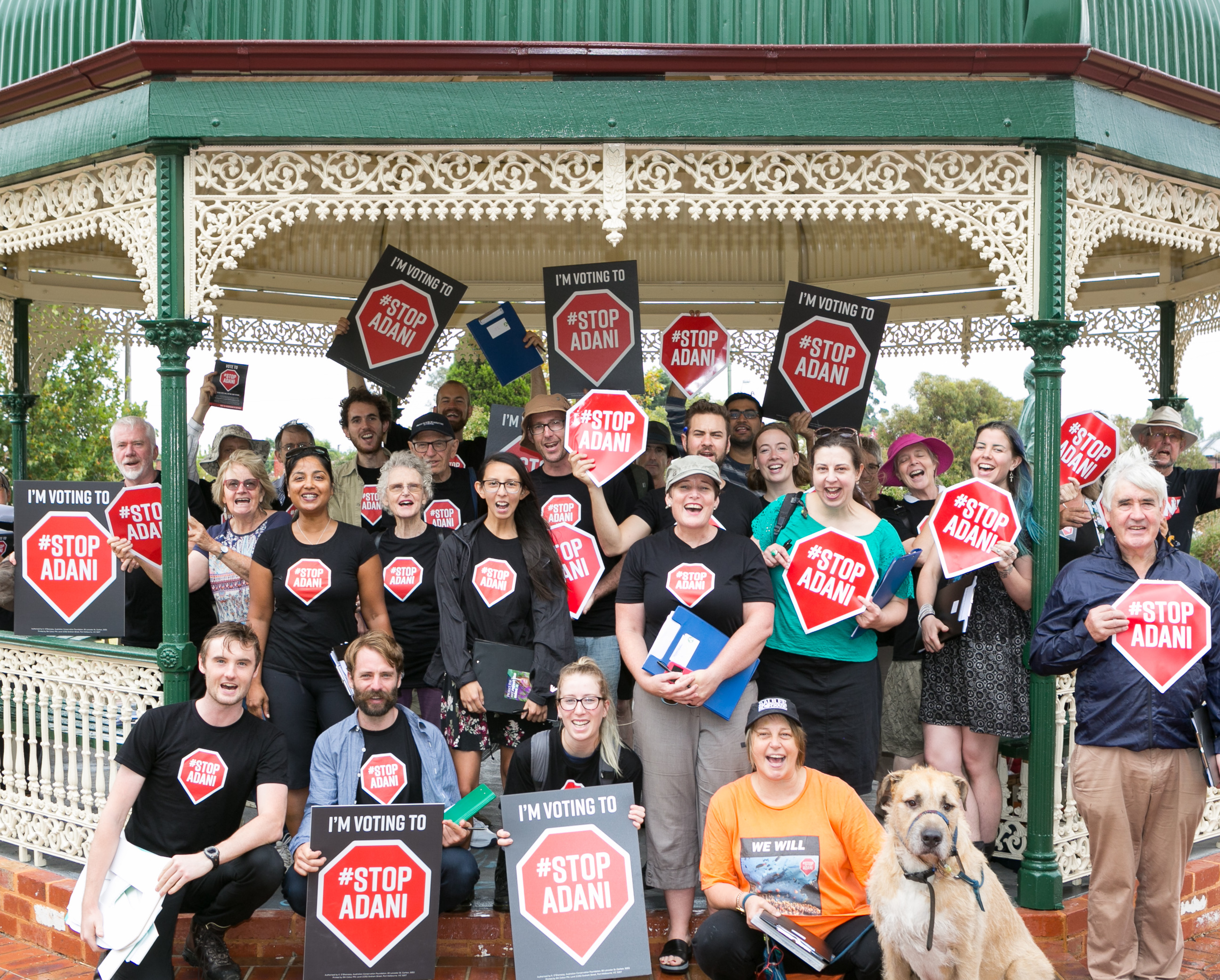
Doorknockers in Batman in February 2018, advocating against the Adani Carmichael coal mine, a significant topic during the by-election.

The Greens heavily focussed on the environment and specifically the proposed Adani Carmichael coal mine in the campaign. Labor leader Bill Shorten and Kearney both expressed their doubts about the project but did not completely rule it out. In December 2017, Shorten contacted the president of the Australian Conservation Foundation (ACF) Geoff Cousins to seek advice about how Labor could change its policy on Adani without sovereign risk. Cousins took Shorten on a tour of the Great Barrier Reef and an aerial tour of the area where the mine would be built. Following Shorten's comments in February 2018 in Townsville, when he said the mine was "just another project", Cousins contacted Shorten to say he would publicly disclose the tours he had given Shorten. In an interview on the Australian Broadcasting Corporation's (ABC) programme 7.30, Shorten discussed the tours and stated he was personally opposed to the mine and would seek to change the party's position on the project.

The ACF distributed material stating only the Greens would "stop Adani's mine from going ahead", and the activist group GetUp! stated they would not assist Labor in campaigning due to its position on the coal mine. Other issues that featured in the campaigning were Labor's proposed reforms to dividend imputation (franking credits); Kearney and Shorten held a town-hall debate about the policy. The Greens also heavily campaigned on asylum seeker and refugee policy, which they perceived as a weakness for Labor.

Divisions within the Greens' campaign assisted Kearney. During the by-election campaign, an internal complaint of bullying by Bhathal was leaked to the media and members of the Greens' Darebin branch requested Bhathal's expulsion from the party following her support for Lidia Thorpe in the 2017 Northcote state by-election. Four Greens councillors were involved in the campaign to have Bhathal removed as the candidate. The ABC reported Greens members stated they would prefer Bhathal to lose despite being in the same party.

Kearney's campaign received the personal endorsement of the former Prime Minister Julia Gillard, who wrote a letter that was distributed to 36,000 houses within the electorate. Kearney's candidacy was also endorsed by EMILY's List Australia, a Labor-aligned organisation that advocates for representation of women in Parliament.

On 6 March, a candidates' forum was held to discuss climate change policy. The candidates Kearney, Bhathal, Whitehead, Smith and McDonald were invited to take part, but the remaining candidates were not invited. In protest at not being invited, Lieshout picketed the event with her mouth taped shut. On 14 March, Kearney's campaign issued an apology for printing campaign material in Greek under the heading "Macedonian". On polling day, reports of seniors receiving telephone calls instructing them not to vote were made; in response, Labor campaigners rang seniors in the electorate to urge them to vote. On the day of the by-election, an environmental protester dressed as a fish accosted Kearney and Shorten at a polling booth.

== Key dates ==
Key dates in relation to the by-election were:

- Thursday, 1 February 2018 – Speaker acceptance of resignation
- Wednesday, 7 February 2018 – Issue of writ
- Wednesday, 14 February 2018 – Close of electoral rolls (8pm)
- Thursday, 22 February 2018 – Close of nominations (12 noon)
- Friday, 23 February 2018 – Declaration of nominations (12 noon)
- Tuesday, 27 February 2018 – Start of early voting
- Saturday, 17 March 2018 – Polling day (8am to 6pm)
- Friday, 30 March 2018 – Last day for receipt of postal votes
- Friday, 18 May 2018 – Last day for return of writs

== Candidates ==
Candidates in ballot paper order
Party	Candidate	Background
Rise Up	Yvonne Gentle	National Secretary of Rise Up Australia and the party's federal candidate for Dunkley in 2013 and Flinders in 2016.
Labor	Ged Kearney	On 2 February 2018, the Labor leader Bill Shorten formally announced Ged Kearney, president of the Australian Council of Trade Unions (ACTU), was Labor's candidate at the by-election. Kearney had been pre-selected for the state seat of Brunswick at the 2018 state election but resigned from the candidacy to contest Batman.
Greens	Alex Bhathal	Greens leader Richard Di Natale confirmed to Guardian Australia on 2 February 2018 Alex Bhathal had been chosen as the Greens' candidate. Bhathal, a former social worker who sat on Darebin Ethnic Communities Council, was the Greens' candidate for the seat five times previously.
Conservatives	Kevin Bailey	On 20 February 2018, the Australian Conservatives director Lyle Shelton announced Kevin Bailey, a businessman and former SAS soldier, would be the party's candidate at the by-election.
People's	Tegan Burns	The party described Burns as "highly passionate about youth and the criminal justice system".
Liberty Alliance	Debbie Robinson	The president of the Australian Liberty Alliance and the party's lead candidate for the Senate in Western Australia in 2016.
Independent	Teresa van Lieshout	Van Lieshout, a perennial candidate for eight state and federal elections – most recently the Canning by-election in 2015 – is a self-published author on social, theological, and political issues, and the founder of the unregistered Voter Rights Party.
	Adrian Whitehead	An environmentalist and the founder of the unregistered Save the Planet Party. He previously contested Corangamite at the 2013 federal election.
Sustainable Australia	Mark McDonald	An Information technology (IT) engineer living in Preston.
Animal Justice	Miranda Smith	Smith previously contested the seat of Melbourne at the 2016 federal election.

== Results ==
2018 Batman by-election
Party	Candidate	Votes	%	±%
Labor	Ged Kearney	36,840	43.14	+7.87
Greens	Alex Bhathal	33,725	39.49	+3.26
Conservatives	Kevin Bailey	5,471	6.41	+6.41
Animal Justice	Miranda Smith	2,528	2.96	+1.29
Rise Up Australia	Yvonne Gentle	2,217	2.60	+2.60
Independent	Teresa van Lieshout	1,245	1.46	+1.46
Liberty Alliance	Debbie Robinson	1,186	1.39	+1.39
Sustainable Australia	Mark McDonald	951	1.11	+1.11
	Adrian Whitehead	745	0.87	+0.87
People's Party	Tegan Burns	496	0.58	+0.58
Total formal votes		85,404	93.79	+1.57
Informal votes		5,650	6.21	−1.57
Turnout		91,054	81.40	−8.28
Two-candidate-preferred result
Labor	Ged Kearney	46,446	54.38	+3.35
Greens	Alex Bhathal	38,958	45.62	−3.35
Labor hold		Swing	+3.35	

Alluvial diagram of the full preference distribution

== Polling ==
Batman by-election polling
Date	Firm	Sample	Primary vote			TPP vote
			ALP	GRN	OTH	ALP	GRN
2018 by-election			43.1%	39.5%	17.4%	54.4%	45.6%
18–20 Feb 2018	Lonergan Research	693	40%	39%	16%	53%	47%
2016 election			35.3%	36.2%	28.5%	51.0%	49.0%

== Aftermath ==
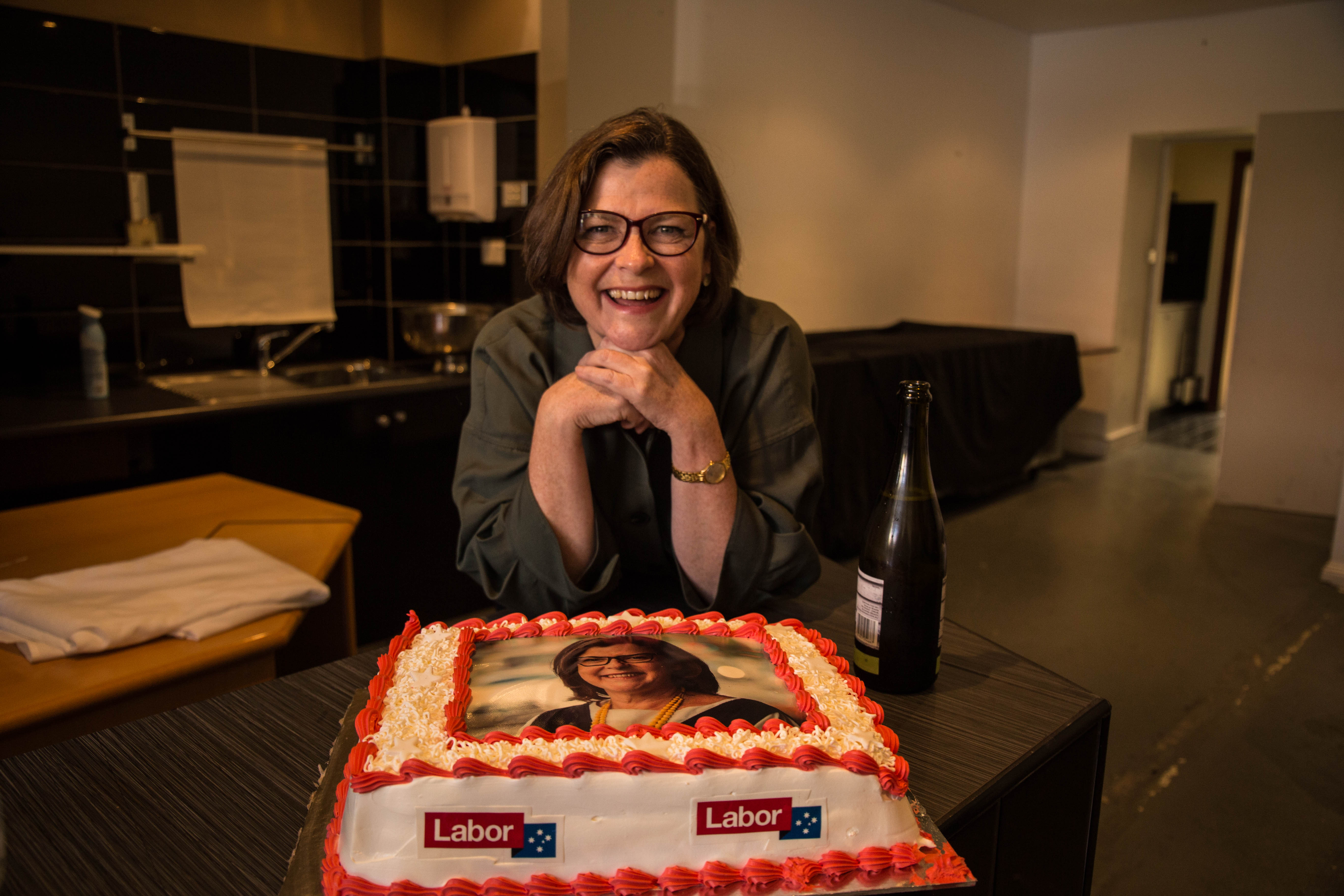
Kearney celebrating on the night of the by-election.

Kearney's election made her the first woman to represent Batman in the seat's 112-year history and made federal Labor's caucus 48% female. The opposition leader Bill Shorten described Kearney as the "Hero of Batman" for her victory. Following the 2018 by-election, the Australian Electoral Commission abolished Batman and created the Division of Cooper, which had similar boundaries. Kearney contested Cooper at the 2019 and the 2022 federal elections, winning both times. Kearney's majority increased in 2019 to 64.65–35.35 (TCP) against the Greens' candidate David Risstrom and was reduced in 2022 to 58.67–41.33 (TCP) against the Greens' candidate Celeste Liddle. Labor formed a government following the 2022 federal election and Prime Minister Anthony Albanese appointed Kearney as Assistant Minister for Health and Aged Care. Liddle's partner Tara Burnett was pre-selected as the Greens candidate for Cooper at the 2025 Australian federal election, and was also defeated by Kearney.

On the night of the by-election, both Bhathal and the Greens' leader Richard Di Natale stated Labor's use of "big money" had significantly contributed to Kearney's victory. Di Natale also stated Labor's win was also helped by preference arrangements with conservative parties. The day after the by-election, Di Natale stated the campaign had been damaged by internal leaking and that traditional Greens voters had been "turned off by the leaking and sabotage from a few individuals with a destructive agenda". Divisions within the Greens that had hampered their campaign in the by-election persisted following the defeat. At the 2018 Victorian state election, Labor's Kat Theophanous unexpectedly won the electoral district of Northcote from the Greens' Lidia Thorpe. Internal analysis of the campaign noted some Greens members refused to campaign for Thorpe due to infighting stemming from the Batman by-election. At the 2022 Victorian state election, Theophanous retained Northcote for Labor with a 1.5% swing to the Greens.

During the by-election campaign, Bhathal stated if she lost Batman, she would contest the seat at the next federal election, but she announced in August 2018 she was withdrawing from the candidacy due to "sabotage" of her by-election campaign. In the same month, an internal Greens review dismissed the bullying allegations against Bhathal that were leaked during the campaign and apologised to her. In February 2019, Bhathal resigned from the Greens, citing "relentless organisational bullying". A documentary entitled The Candidate was made about Bhathal's campaign. The screening of the film in July 2019 was sabotaged; the venue's fire alarm was set off as soon as the film started. In 2024, Bhathal became a candidate for West Ward at the Darebin City Council election, which was held on 26 October 2024. She ran against Darebin Mayor Sussane Newton, one of the four Greens councillors who tried to remove Bhathal as the candidate for Batman in 2018. Neither Bhathal nor Newton were elected at this election.

The Liberal party signalled a lack of interest in the results; the Prime Minister Malcolm Turnbull and the Treasurer Scott Morrison dismissed any implications for Labor's broader electoral success.

In December 2018, the proposed Adani Carmichael coal mine was scaled down from 60 million tons of coal per year to 10 million tons of coal per year. The project began construction in 2019 and the mine announced its first export shipment in December 2021. Protests and legal challenges against the mine continued throughout the construction.

An episode of Tonightly with Tom Ballard that aired during the campaign caused controversy by referring to the electorate's namesake John Batman and Australian Conservatives' candidate Kevin Bailey as "cunts". Both the Communications Minister Mitch Fifield and the Education Minister Simon Birmingham called for the ABC to dismiss someone over the remarks. In August 2018, the ABC found the remarks did not breach its standards.

== See also ==
- 1911 Batman by-election
- 1962 Batman by-election
- 2017 Northcote state by-election
- Electoral results for the Division of Batman
- List of Australian federal by-elections
