= Electoral results for the district of Burwood =

Australian district election results

This is a list of electoral results for the electoral district of Burwood in Victorian state elections.

== Members for Burwood ==
First incarnation (1955–1967)
Member	Party	Term
Jim MacDonald	Liberal and Country	1955–1965
Jim MacDonald	Liberal	1965–1967
Second incarnation (1976–present)
Member	Party	Term
Jeff Kennett	Liberal	1976–1999
Bob Stensholt	Labor	1999–2010
Graham Watt	Liberal	2010–2018
Will Fowles	Labor	2018–2022

== Election results ==
=== Elections in the 2010s ===
2018 Victorian state election: Burwood
Party	Candidate	Votes	%	±%
Liberal	Graham Watt	16,138	42.73	−7.33
Labor	Will Fowles	14,924	39.52	+5.10
Greens	Graham Ross	4,604	12.19	−0.80
Sustainable Australia	Andrew Williams	1,101	2.92	+2.92
Animal Justice	Amanda Beattie	1,000	2.65	+2.65
Total formal votes		37,767	96.55	+0.02
Informal votes		1,348	3.45	−0.02
Turnout		39,115	90.61	−2.80
Two-party-preferred result
Labor	Will Fowles	20,132	53.31	+6.47
Liberal	Graham Watt	17,635	46.69	−6.47
Labor gain from Liberal		Swing	+6.47	

2014 Victorian state election: Burwood
Party	Candidate	Votes	%	±%
Liberal	Graham Watt	18,902	50.1	−0.1
Labor	Gavin Ryan	12,995	34.4	+1.5
Greens	Beck Stuart	4,904	13.0	+1.1
Independent	Peter Campbell	960	2.5	+2.5
Total formal votes		37,761	96.5	−0.2
Informal votes		1,357	3.5	+0.2
Turnout		39,118	93.4	+0.6
Two-party-preferred result
Liberal	Graham Watt	20,079	53.2	−3.1
Labor	Gavin Ryan	17,688	46.8	+3.1
Liberal hold		Swing	−3.1	

2010 Victorian state election: Burwood
Party	Candidate	Votes	%	±%
Liberal	Graham Watt	17,500	49.70	+8.46
Labor	Bob Stensholt	11,732	33.32	−8.77
Greens	Emily Cowan	4,146	11.78	−0.81
Sex Party	Eamon Cole-Flynn	751	2.13	+2.13
Democratic Labor	Lucia De Summa	545	1.55	+1.55
Family First	Iming Chan	536	1.52	−2.55
Total formal votes		35,210	96.66	−0.56
Informal votes		1,215	3.34	+0.56
Turnout		36,245	93.51	+0.54
Two-party-preferred result
Liberal	Graham Watt	19,710	55.86	+9.59
Labor	Bob Stensholt	15,574	44.14	−9.59
Liberal gain from Labor		Swing	+9.59	

=== Elections in the 2000s ===
2006 Victorian state election: Burwood
Party	Candidate	Votes	%	±%
Labor	Bob Stensholt	14,565	42.09	−3.01
Liberal	Graham Bailey	14,272	41.24	+1.19
Greens	John Presley	4,358	12.59	+1.06
Family First	John Canavan	1,408	4.07	+4.07
Total formal votes		34,603	97.22	−0.27
Informal votes		989	2.78	+0.27
Turnout		35,592	92.97	−0.58
Two-party-preferred result
Labor	Bob Stensholt	18,581	53.73	−1.35
Liberal	Graham Bailey	16,003	46.27	+1.35
Labor hold		Swing	−1.35	

2002 Victorian state election: Burwood
Party	Candidate	Votes	%	±%
Labor	Bob Stensholt	15,598	45.1	+2.3
Liberal	Di Rule	13,850	40.0	−14.6
Greens	Josephine Lee	3,989	11.5	+11.5
Independent	Tom Morissey	1,148	3.3	+3.3
Total formal votes		34,845	97.5	+0.0
Informal votes		891	2.5	−0.0
Two-party-preferred result
Labor	Bob Stensholt	19,052	55.1	+10.9
Liberal	Di Rule	15,533	44.9	−10.9
Labor hold		Swing	+10.9	

=== Elections in the 1990s ===
1999 Burwood state by-election
Party	Candidate	Votes	%	±%
Labor	Bob Stensholt	13,410	45.05	+3.51
Liberal	Lana McLean	12,054	40.49	–15.02
Independent	Stephen Mayne	1,975	6.63	+6.63
Greens	Philip Crohn	1,875	6.30	+6.30
Democratic Labor	Peter Ferwerda	453	1.52	+1.52
Total formal votes		29,767	97.57	+0.02
Informal votes		741	2.43	–0.02
Turnout		30,508	87.26	–5.72
Two-party-preferred result
Labor	Bob Stensholt	15,963	53.63	+10.42
Liberal	Lana McLean	13,804	46.37	–10.42
Labor gain from Liberal		Swing	10.42	

1999 Victorian state election: Burwood
Party	Candidate	Votes	%	±%
Liberal	Jeff Kennett	17,455	55.5	−1.7
Labor	Bob Stensholt	13,062	41.5	+2.0
Natural Law	Mark Bunn	734	2.3	−0.9
Abolish Child Support	Justice Abolish	194	0.6	+0.6
Total formal votes		31,445	97.6	−0.7
Informal votes		789	2.4	+0.7
Turnout		32,234	93.0	
Two-party-preferred result
Liberal	Jeff Kennett	17,858	56.8	−1.8
Labor	Bob Stensholt	13,585	43.2	+1.8
Liberal hold		Swing	−1.8	

1996 Victorian state election: Burwood
Party	Candidate	Votes	%	±%
Liberal	Jeff Kennett	17,836	57.2	-0.0
Labor	Helen Matthews	12,321	39.5	+6.6
Natural Law	Neil Phillips	1,001	3.2	−0.9
Total formal votes		31,158	98.3	+1.5
Informal votes		546	1.7	−1.5
Turnout		31,704	94.0	
Two-party-preferred result
Liberal	Jeff Kennett	18,234	58.6	−0.7
Labor	Helen Matthews	12,895	41.4	+0.7
Liberal hold		Swing	−0.7	

1992 Victorian state election: Burwood
Party	Candidate	Votes	%	±%
Liberal	Jeff Kennett	17,560	57.2	+7.7
Labor	Frank Dempsey	10,098	32.9	−11.8
Natural Law	Richard Aldous	1,265	4.1	+4.1
Independent	Jon Sonnberg	950	3.1	+3.1
Independent	Geoff Dreschler	800	2.6	+2.6
Total formal votes		30,673	96.8	−0.4
Informal votes		1,023	3.2	+0.4
Turnout		31,696	95.0	
Two-party-preferred result
Liberal	Jeff Kennett	18,157	59.3	+7.1
Labor	Frank Dempsey	12,452	40.7	−7.1
Liberal hold		Swing	+7.1	

=== Elections in the 1980s ===
1988 Victorian state election: Burwood
Party	Candidate	Votes	%	±%
Liberal	Jeff Kennett	13,759	52.90	−2.68
Labor	Eric Hobsbawn	10,938	42.06	−2.36
Call to Australia	Barbara McCrohan	1,310	5.04	+5.04
Total formal votes		26,007	97.58	−0.18
Informal votes		644	2.42	+0.18
Turnout		26,651	92.32	−0.81
Two-party-preferred result
Liberal	Jeff Kennett	14,458	55.59	+0.01
Labor	Eric Hobsbawn	11,549	44.41	−0.01
Liberal hold		Swing	+0.01	

1985 Victorian state election: Burwood
Party	Candidate	Votes	%	±%
Liberal	Jeff Kennett	15,117	55.6	+6.2
Labor	Eric Hobsbawn	12,083	44.4	+3.0
Total formal votes		27,200	97.8	
Informal votes		622	2.2	
Turnout		27,822	93.1	
Liberal hold		Swing	+2.5	

1982 Victorian state election: Burwood
Party	Candidate	Votes	%	±%
Liberal	Jeff Kennett	12,809	52.6	−1.6
Labor	Paul Trewern	9,269	38.1	+2.5
Democrats	Harold Jeffrey	2,278	9.4	−0.8
Total formal votes		24,356	98.4	+0.1
Informal votes		388	1.6	−0.1
Turnout		24,744	94.1	+1.2
Two-party-preferred result
Liberal	Jeff Kennett	13,777	56.6	−2.5
Labor	Paul Trewern	10,579	43.4	+2.5
Liberal hold		Swing	−2.5	

=== Elections in the 1970s ===
1979 Victorian state election: Burwood
Party	Candidate	Votes	%	±%
Liberal	Jeff Kennett	13,599	54.2	−3.6
Labor	Douglas Bennett	8,938	35.6	+1.6
Democrats	Veronica Lysaght	2,548	10.2	+10.2
Total formal votes		25,085	98.3	−0.1
Informal votes		428	1.7	+0.1
Turnout		25,513	92.9	0.0
Two-party-preferred result
Liberal	Jeff Kennett	14,815	59.1	−5.5
Labor	Douglas Bennett	10,270	40.9	+5.5
Liberal hold		Swing	−5.5	

1976 Victorian state election: Burwood
Party	Candidate	Votes	%	±%
Liberal	Jeff Kennett	14,926	57.8	−0.9
Labor	Douglas Bennett	8,761	34.0	+3.4
Democratic Labor	Joseph Stanley	1,680	6.5	−0.9
Workers	Michael Boffa	437	1.7	+1.7
Total formal votes		25,804	98.4	
Informal votes		412	1.6	
Turnout		26,216	92.9	
Two-party-preferred result
Liberal	Jeff Kennett	16,679	64.6	−2.2
Labor	Douglas Bennett	9,125	35.4	+2.2
Liberal hold		Swing	−2.2	

=== Elections in the 1960s ===
1964 Victorian state election: Burwood
Party	Candidate	Votes	%	±%
Liberal and Country	Jim MacDonald	12,272	61.2	+1.9
Labor	Mary Barnard	5,058	25.2	−0.9
Democratic Labor	Kenneth Abbott	2,715	13.5	−1.1
Total formal votes		20,045	98.4	0.0
Informal votes		318	1.6	0.0
Turnout		20,363	94.3	−0.4
Two-party-preferred result
Liberal and Country	Jim MacDonald	14,579	72.8	+1.1
Labor	Mary Barnard	5,466	27.2	−1.1
Liberal and Country hold		Swing	+1.1	

1961 Victorian state election: Burwood
Party	Candidate	Votes	%	±%
Liberal and Country	Jim MacDonald	11,929	59.3	−10.7
Labor	Peter Lynn	5,252	26.1	−3.9
Democratic Labor	John Duffy	2,944	14.6	+14.6
Total formal votes		20,125	98.4	0.0
Informal votes		319	1.6	0.0
Turnout		20,444	94.7	−0.1
Two-party-preferred result
Liberal and Country	Jim MacDonald	14,382	71.7	+1.6
Labor	Peter Lynn	5,743	28.3	−1.6
Liberal and Country hold		Swing	+1.6	

=== Elections in the 1950s ===
1958 Victorian state election: Burwood
Party	Candidate	Votes	%	±%
Liberal and Country	Jim MacDonald	14,125	70.0	
Labor	Vincent Scully	6,040	30.0	
Total formal votes		20,165	98.4	
Informal votes		322	1.6	
Turnout		20,487	94.8	
Liberal and Country hold		Swing		

1955 Victorian state election: Burwood
Party	Candidate	Votes	%	±%
Liberal and Country	Jim MacDonald	12,190	62.1	
Labor	Gwendolyn Noad	4,965	25.3	
Labor (A-C)	William Mahoney	1,954	9.9	
Independent	Ivan Robinson	530	2.7	
Total formal votes		19,639	98.3	
Informal votes		334	1.7	
Turnout		19,973	93.8	
Two-party-preferred result
Liberal and Country	Jim MacDonald	14,117	71.9	
Labor	Gwendolyn Noad	5,522	28.1	
Liberal and Country hold		Swing		
