= 2017 Northcote state by-election =

By-election in Victoria, Australia

- 18 November 2017

The Electoral district of Northcote in the Legislative Assembly of Victoria
- Turnout: 79.0% ▼11.6

	First party	Second party
Candidate	Lidia Thorpe	Clare Burns
Party	Greens	Labor
Percentage	45.2%	35.4%
Swing	▲8.9	▼5.6
2CP	55.6%	44.4%
2CP swing	▲11.6	▼11.6
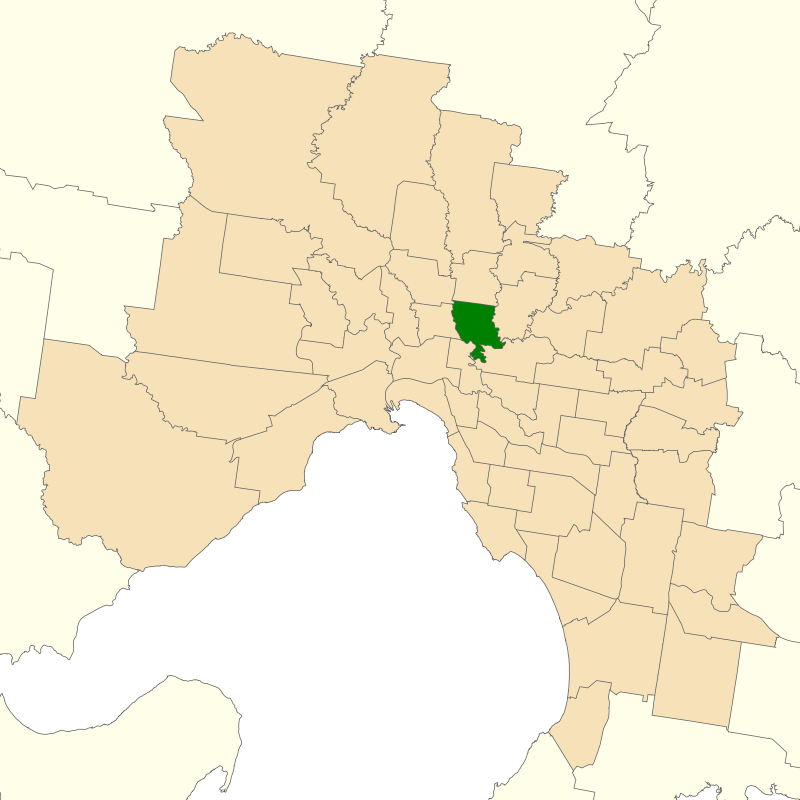
- Location of the electoral district of Northcote, in Melbourne's inner northern suburbs
MLA before election
Fiona Richardson
Labor
Elected MLA
Lidia Thorpe
Greens

A by-election for the seat of Northcote in the Victorian Legislative Assembly was held on 18 November 2017. The by-election was triggered by the death of Labor Party MP Fiona Richardson on 23 August 2017. While the seat historically has firmly been in the Labor Party's hands since its inception in 1927, environmental issues, rising house prices and demographic trends have resulted in a stronger Greens vote at recent elections. The Liberal Party elected not to field a candidate.

The seat was won by the Greens on a swing of more than 11.5%. ABC election expert Antony Green called the seat for the Greens at 8.30 pm on the night of the count. Greens candidate Lidia Thorpe became the first female Aboriginal MP in the Victorian Parliament as a result of the victory and the Greens increased their representation in the Legislative Assembly to three MPs.

== Background ==
The by-election was called following the death of former Labor member for the district and Minister for Women, Fiona Richardson. Having taken medical leave from Parliament on 7 August 2017, she died in office on 23 August. This triggered a vacancy in the seat, with writs for election being issued by the Assembly Speaker, Colin Brooks.

== Candidates ==
A total of 12 candidates were declared nominated by the VEC. The Liberal Party decided against fielding a candidate.

12 candidates in ballot paper order
Party	Candidate	Background
Independent	Russell Hayward	Preston resident and executive-level manager in welfare and disability sectors.
Independent	Brian Sanaghan	Former Northcote Councillor in 1970s, later expelled for refusing to take oath to Queen.
Greens	Lidia Thorpe	Gunnai-Gunditjmara businesswoman.
Animal Justice	Nina Lenk	Animal activist and party Northern Metropolitan Manager.
Independent	Laura Chipp	Daughter of Don Chipp, former leader of the Australian Democrats. Endorsed by the unregistered Reason Party (formerly known as the Australian Sex Party).
Independent	Philip Cooper	Yorta Yorta elder with 40 years' experience in Aboriginal community affairs.
Liberal Democrats	Dean Rossiter	Student at La Trobe University.
Labor	Clare Burns	Speech pathologist and union official.
Independent	Joseph Toscano	Medical practitioner, broadcaster and anarchist activist.
Independent	Bryony Edwards	Previously worked in human services policy making and community development.
Independent	Nevena Spirovska	Freelance writer.
Independent	Vince Fontana	Former Darebin councillor and mayor.

== Results ==
Northcote state by-election, 2017
Party	Candidate	Votes	%	±%
Greens	Lidia Thorpe	16,319	45.2	+8.9
Labor	Clare Burns	12,779	35.4	−5.6
Independent	Vince Fontana	1,864	5.2	+5.2
Liberal Democrats	Dean Rossiter	1,497	4.1	+4.1
Independent Reason	Laura Chipp	1,152	3.2	+3.2
Animal Justice	Nina Lenk	773	2.1	+0.4
Independent	Philip Cooper	436	1.2	+1.2
Independent	Russell Hayward	360	1.0	+1.0
Independent	Joseph Toscano	331	0.9	+0.9
Independent	Nevena Spirovska	215	0.6	+0.6
Independent	Brian Sanaghan	208	0.6	+0.6
Save The Planet	Bryony Edwards	54	0.4	−0.4
Total formal votes		36,088	94.9	−0.9
Informal votes		1,940	5.1	+0.9
Turnout		38,028	79.0	−12.6
Two-candidate-preferred result
Greens	Lidia Thorpe	20,137	55.6	+11.6
Labor	Clare Burns	16,080	44.4	−11.6
After distribution of preferences
Greens	Lidia Thorpe	18,380	50.9	N/A
Labor	Clare Burns	14,410	39.9	N/A
Independent	Vince Fontana	3,298	9.1	N/A
Greens gain from Labor		Swing	+11.6	

The VEC stops distributing preferences when a candidate reaches over 50 per cent of the vote. An indicative two-candidate-preferred count had Lidia Thorpe (Greens) on 20,137 votes (55.6%) to Clare Burns (Labor) on 16,080 votes (44.4%)—a swing of 11.6 percentage points to the Greens.

== See also ==
- List of Victorian state by-elections
- 2018 Batman by-election
