= Graham Watt =

Politician

- Watt in 2026

Member of the Victorian Legislative Assembly for Burwood
- In office 27 November 2010 – 24 November 2018
- Preceded by: Bob Stensholt
- Succeeded by: Will Fowles

Personal details
- Born: 18 August 1976 (age 50) Norseman, Western Australia
- Party: Liberal
- Spouse: Rachel Carling-Jenkins
- Parent: Graham Jack Watt Yvonne Karen Watt
- Education: Edith Cowan University
- Website: grahamwatt.com.au

Graham Travis Watt (born 18 August 1976) is an Australian politician. He was a member of the Victorian Legislative Assembly from 2010 to 2018, representing the seat of Burwood. He is a member of the Liberal Party.

== Early life ==
As a child, Watt was a represented his state in athletics. In 2004, he walked a hundred miles in 24 hours, to become an Australian centurion, something achieved by only 48 people on Australian soil, at that time.

Watt graduated from Edith Cowan University, obtaining a Bachelor of Business, and majoring in Finance and Economics.

Before election to parliament he worked variously as the owner of a mobile phone retail store and a carpet cleaning business.

== Political career ==
Watt ran for the Liberal Party in 2002 and 2006 in the electoral district of Northcote, losing to Mary Delahunty in 2002 and Fiona Richardson in 2006.

In 2009 he was preselected as the Liberal candidate for the electorate of Burwood, which he won at the 2010 Victorian election, defeating the sitting Labor member Bob Stensholt.

He was re-elected in the 2014 Victorian election with 50.1% of the primary vote and 53.17% of the 2 candidate preferred vote.

In 2015, Watt was criticised for being the only member of the Victorian Parliament to not stand to applaud domestic violence campaigner Rosie Batty when she addressed the parliament in an historic joint sitting.

Watt was subsequently defeated in the 2018 Victorian state election.

In 2022, Watt ran as a Liberal candidate again, this time in Melton, but was unsuccessful.

== Personal life ==
In 2021, Watt married former DLP Member of Parliament Rachel Carling.

Victorian Legislative Assembly
Preceded by Bob Stensholt	Member for Burwood; 2010–2018	Succeeded by Will Fowles
