= 1999 Burwood state by-election =

A by-election was held for the Victorian Legislative Assembly seat of Burwood on 11 December 1999. The by-election was triggered by the resignation on 2 November of Jeff Kennett, the sitting Liberal member and Premier of Victoria until his government was defeated in the 1999 state election on 18 September.

Bob Stensholt, Kennett's Labor opponent in the state election, won the seat on a swing of 10.4 percent, aided by the Liberals losing 15 percent of their primary vote from two months earlier.

== Results ==
1999 Burwood by-election
Party	Candidate	Votes	%	±%
Labor	Bob Stensholt	13,410	45.05	+3.51
Liberal	Lana McLean	12,054	40.49	–15.02
Independent	Stephen Mayne	1,975	6.63	+6.63
Greens	Philip Crohn	1,875	6.30	+6.30
Democratic Labor	Peter Ferwerda	453	1.52	+1.52
Total formal votes		29,767	97.57	+0.02
Informal votes		741	2.43	–0.02
Turnout		30,508	87.26	–5.72
Two-party-preferred result
Labor	Bob Stensholt	15,963	53.63	+10.42
Liberal	Lana McLean	13,804	46.37	–10.42
Labor gain from Liberal		Swing	+10.42	
