= Bob Stensholt =

Australian politician

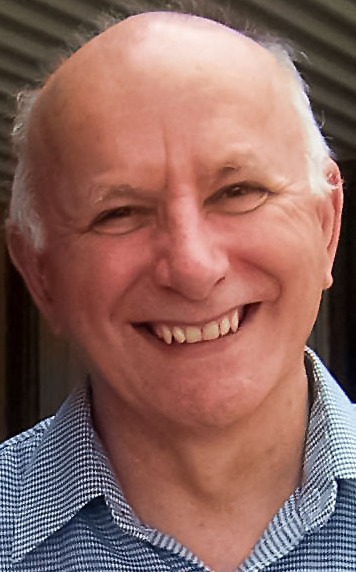
- Stensholt

Member of the Victorian Legislative Assembly for Burwood
- In office 11 December 1999 – 27 November 2010
- Preceded by: Jeff Kennett
- Succeeded by: Graham Watt

Personal details
- Born: Robert Einar Stensholt; 11 July 1945 (age 81) Melbourne, Victoria, Australia
- Party: Labor Party
- Education: Australian National University
- Occupation: Politician, Aid worker

Robert Einar Stensholt (born 11 July 1945) is a former Australian Labor Party politician who represented the Victorian state seat of Burwood in the Victorian Legislative Assembly (the lower house) of the state's parliament.

Stensholt represented Burwood for the Victorian ALP from 1999 to 2010. From 2007 he was the Chair of the Public Accounts and Estimates Committee, and from February 2003 to December 2006 he was Parliamentary Secretary for Treasury and Finance.

Stensholt's initial victory in the seat of Burwood came at a by-election on 11 December 1999 following the resignation from parliament of the previous member for Burwood (and former Premier of Victoria) Jeff Kennett. Stensholt had been defeated by Kennett at the state election held two months earlier. However, at the by-election, the Liberals lost 15 percent of their primary vote, allowing Stensholt to take the seat on a swing of 10.4 percent.

His by-election victory was unexpected and cemented the result of the 1999 state election, which for a period had been up for grabs following an election in which three independents ended up with the balance of power, eventually throwing their support behind the Labor Party. The Liberals, in the person of Kennett, had held the seat since it was recreated in 1976, most recently by a margin of 10% at the state election less than two months previously.

Early in his career, Stensholt had studied to be a Catholic priest, a matter the Liberal Party attempted to make some mileage out of during his by-election campaign.

Since discontinuing his religious studies, he had primarily worked in various roles with the Australian Public Service in Canberra, most notably as Assistant Director-General of Australia's overseas aid program, AusAID. Prior to being elected, he was working as a senior research fellow at Monash University and as an international development consultant.

He was re-elected for a third term at the 2006 Victorian State Election with a two-candidate preferred margin of 7.46%.

He was defeated at the 2010 election when the ALP was voted out of office, with a 9.6% swing against him, seeing the seat return to Liberal hands.

Victorian Legislative Assembly
Preceded by Jeff Kennett	Member for Burwood; 1999–2010	Succeeded by Graham Watt
