= Electoral district of Burwood =

State electoral district of Victoria, Australia

Burwood Victoria—Legislative Assembly
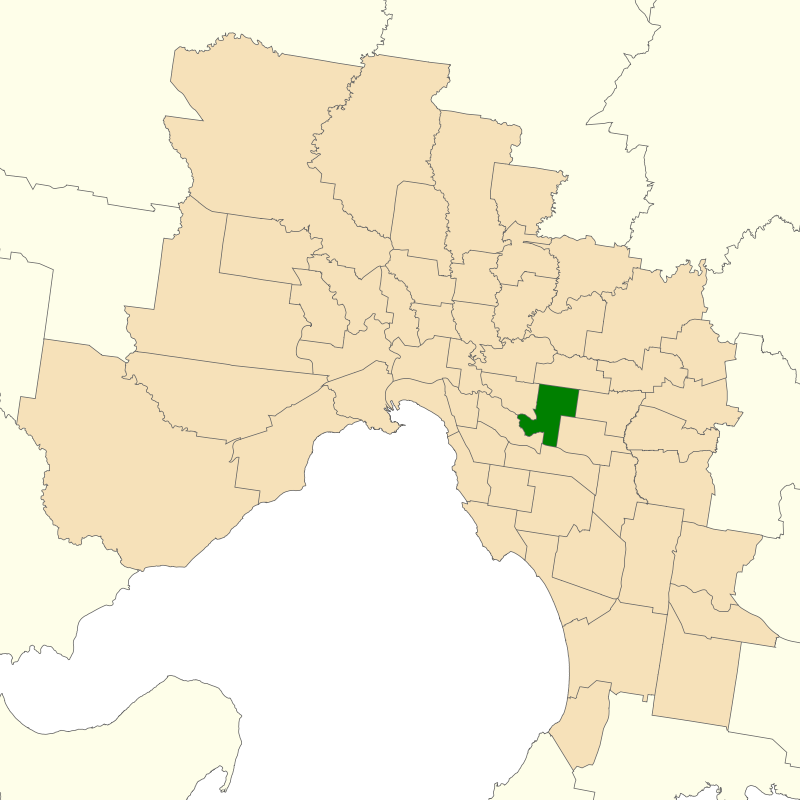
- Location of Burwood (dark green) in Greater Melbourne
- State: Victoria
- Dates current: 1955–1967; 1976–2022
- MP: Will Fowles
- Party: Australian Labor Party
- Namesake: Burwood, Victoria
- Electors: 43,169 (2018)
- Area: 25 km^{2} (9.7 sq mi)
- Demographic: Metropolitan
- Coordinates: 37°51′45″S 145°04′50″E

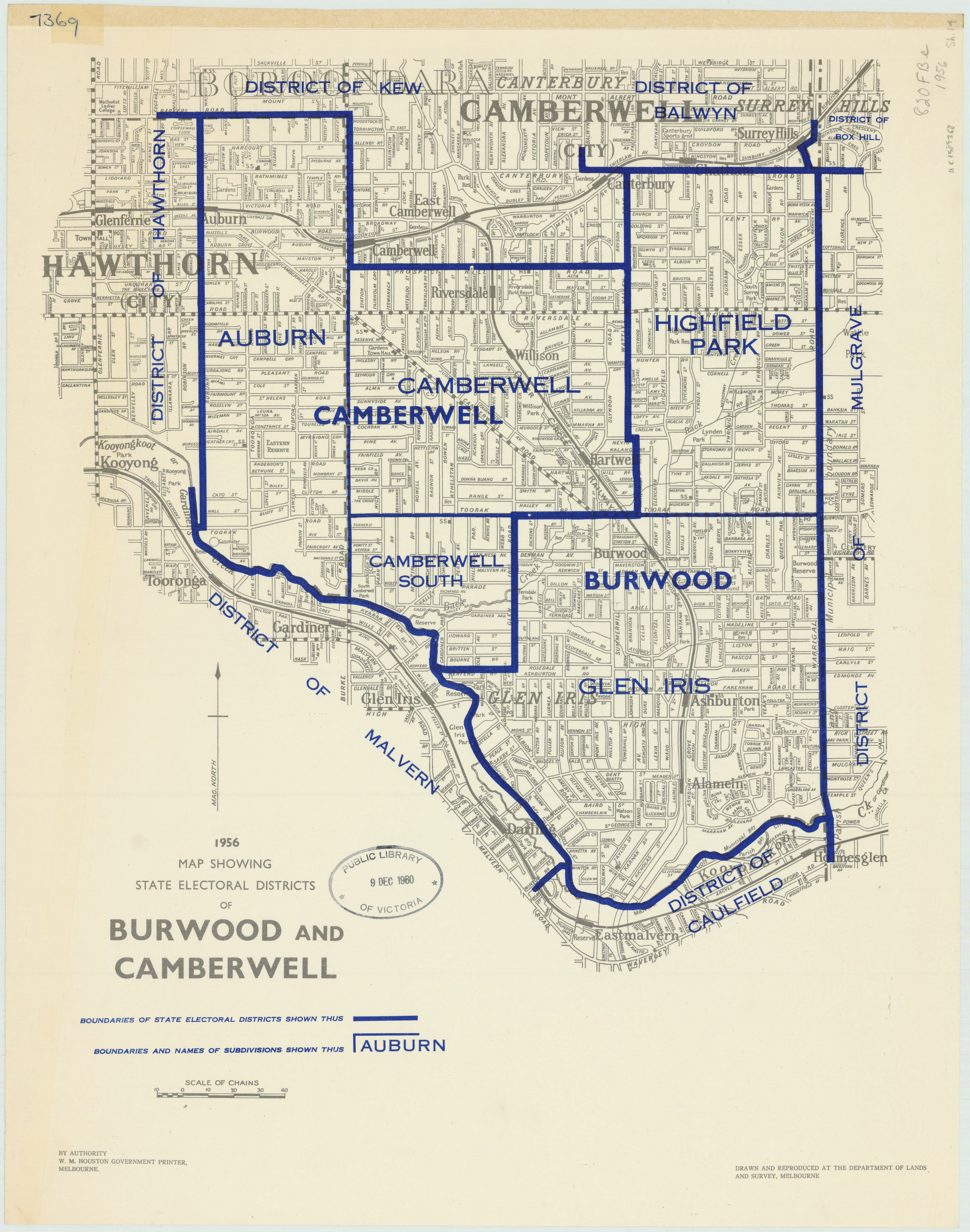
Districts of Burwood and Camberwell as they applied in 1956.

The electoral district of Burwood was an electorate for the Victorian Legislative Assembly in Australia. It was located approximately 13 kilometres east of Melbourne, and covered an area of 25 km^{2} (9.7 sq mi). The seat included the suburbs of Ashburton, Ashwood, Box Hill South, Burwood, Chadstone, and parts of Camberwell, Canterbury, Glen Iris, and Surrey Hills. It was created in 1955 as part of the expansion of the Legislative Assembly, and abolished in 1967, replaced by Glen Iris. Burwood was recreated in 1976, replacing Glen Iris.

The seat's most notable member was Jeff Kennett, who won the seat on its recreation in 1976 and went on to serve as leader of the Liberal Party from 1982 to 1989 and from 1991 to 1999, and as Premier of Victoria from 1992 to 1999. Kennett retired after his government's shock defeat at the 1999 election. In the ensuring by-election, his Labor opponent in the general election, Bob Stensholt, won the previously safe Liberal seat on a swing of over 10 percent.

Stensholt went on to hold the seat in his own right for two more terms before Graham Watt regained it for the Liberals. However, he lost his seat at the 2018 Victorian state election to Labor candidate Will Fowles.

The seat was abolished by the Electoral Boundaries Commission ahead of the 2022 election and replaced by the electoral district of Ashwood.

== Members for Burwood ==
First incarnation (1955–1967)
Member	Party	Term
Jim MacDonald	Liberal and Country	1955–1965
Jim MacDonald	Liberal	1965–1967
Second incarnation (1976–present)
Member	Party	Term
Jeff Kennett	Liberal	1976–1999
Bob Stensholt	Labor	1999–2010
Graham Watt	Liberal	2010–2018
Will Fowles	Labor	2018–2022

== Election results ==
2018 Victorian state election: Burwood
Party	Candidate	Votes	%	±%
Liberal	Graham Watt	16,138	42.73	−7.33
Labor	Will Fowles	14,924	39.52	+5.10
Greens	Graham Ross	4,604	12.19	−0.80
Sustainable Australia	Andrew Williams	1,101	2.92	+2.92
Animal Justice	Amanda Beattie	1,000	2.65	+2.65
Total formal votes		37,767	96.55	+0.02
Informal votes		1,348	3.45	−0.02
Turnout		39,115	90.61	−2.80
Two-party-preferred result
Labor	Will Fowles	20,132	53.31	+6.47
Liberal	Graham Watt	17,635	46.69	−6.47
Labor gain from Liberal		Swing	+6.47	

Two-party-preferred vote results in Burwood View source data.
