= Kat Theophanous =

Australian politician

Kat Theophanous MP

Member of the Victorian Legislative Assembly for Northcote
- Incumbent
- Assumed office 24 November 2018
- Preceded by: Lidia Thorpe

Personal details
- Born: December 9, 1986 (age 39) Melbourne
- Party: Labor Party
- Parent: Theo Theophanous (father)
- Website: www.kattheophanous.com.au

Kat Theophanous is an Australian politician. She is the Labor Party member of the Victorian Legislative Assembly, representing the seat of Northcote since 2018. She is a member of the Labor Right faction.

Theophanous was appointed Parliamentary Secretary for Women's Health in 2022.

== Background ==
Theophanous was born and raised in Alphington, the youngest child of Greek Cypriot migrant parents. Her father Theo Theophanous was a former Labor state politician and minister in the 1990s and 2000s. Her uncle (Theo's brother) Andrew Theophanous was also a former Labor federal politician in the 1980s and 1990s.

Theophanous defeated the Greens' Lidia Thorpe at the 2018 State Election to become the Member of Parliament for Northcote. Chinese property developer donations and in-kind support to her in this election campaign were earnt by Theo Theophanous .

Kat Theophanous won the 2022 State Election narrowly, after employing the Greensfacts campaign.

== Professional experience ==
Before entering Parliament, Theophanous worked as an advisor to Fiona Richardson, the previous Labor Member for Northcote and former Minister for Women and Prevention of Family Violence. She worked to deliver Victoria's first Gender Equality Strategy.

Previous to this, Theophanous worked in Government Relations and Corporate Affairs at the Special Broadcasting Agency (SBS).

== Education ==
She attended Northcote Primary School, and later Alphington Grammar before graduating from University High School. Theophanous completed a Bachelor of Arts in Media and Communications at the University of Melbourne in 2008. She later completed a Bachelor of Arts Honours from the University of Melbourne in 2011, majoring in philosophy.

== Personal life ==
Theophanous is married and has two children.

== See also ==
Political families of Australia

Parliament of Victoria
Preceded by Lidia Thorpe	Member for Northcote; 2018–present	Incumbent
