= Lidia Thorpe =

Aboriginal Australian politician (born 1973)

Senator Lidia Thorpe
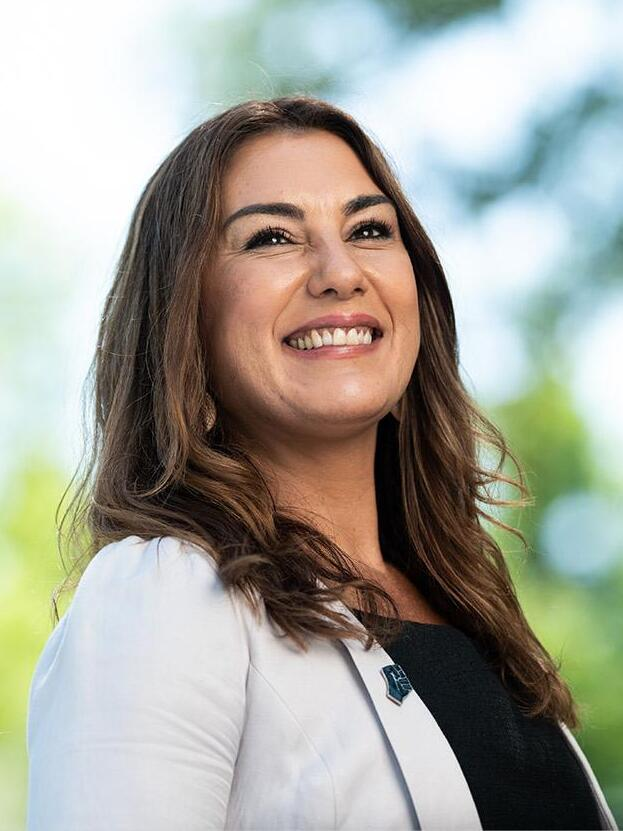
- Lidia Thorpe

Senator for Victoria
- Incumbent
- Assumed office 4 September 2020
- Preceded by: Richard Di Natale

Deputy Leader of the Greens in the Senate
- In office 10 June 2022 – 20 October 2022
- Leader: Adam Bandt
- Preceded by: Office established

Member of the Victorian Legislative Assembly for Northcote
- In office 18 November 2017 – 24 November 2018
- Preceded by: Fiona Richardson
- Succeeded by: Kat Theophanous

Personal details
- Born: Lidia Alma Thorpe; 18 August 1973 (age 53) Carlton, Victoria, Australia
- Party: Independent (since 2023)
- Other political affiliations: Greens (until 2023)
- Children: 3
- Relatives: Alma Thorpe (grandmother); Robbie Thorpe (uncle)

Lidia Alma Thorpe (born 18 August 1973) is an Australian politician. She has been a senator for Victoria since 2020 and is the first Aboriginal senator from that state. She was a member of the Australian Greens until February 2023, when she quit the party over disagreements concerning the proposed Indigenous Voice to Parliament, and became a key figure in the "progressive No" campaign against the Voice referendum in October 2023. Thorpe served as the Greens' deputy leader in the Senate from June to October 2022.

Thorpe has previously been a member of the Victorian Parliament. On winning the Northcote state by-election on 18 November 2017, she became the first known Aboriginal woman elected to the state's parliament. She served as the member for the division of Northcote in the Legislative Assembly from 2017 to 2018.

Thorpe has received media attention for her support of the Indigenous sovereignty movement and her criticism of the legitimacy of Australian political institutions, which she views as the legacy of colonialism.

== Early life and education ==
Lidia Alma Thorpe was born on 18 August 1973 in Carlton, Victoria, to Roy Illingworth and Marjorie Thorpe. She is of English, Irish, Djab Wurrung, Gunnai and Gunditjmara descent.

Thorpe grew up in Housing Commission flats in Collingwood and went to Gold Street Primary School in Clifton Hill. She studied Year 7 at Fitzroy High School, Year 8 at Collingwood High, returned to Fitzroy High for Year 9, but left soon afterwards, at the age of 14. She has stated that, at school, she was harassed "as a black kid," and she would retaliate by punching "boys and the girls out," instead of which, now, she says, "I’ve learnt to use my mouth."

Her first job was working with her uncle Robbie Thorpe at the Koori Information Centre at 120 Gertrude Street, Fitzroy, which at that time was "a hub of Black political activity". She says that from that day onward, she has worked continuously, apart from six-month breaks after the birth of each of her children.

She won the 2021 Social Impact Award from Swinburne University of Technology, from which she graduated in 2007 with a Diploma of Community Development. (Note: In a 2018 interview, Thorpe said, "I was born into politics, know nothing else." See IndigenousX (2018).)

== Early career ==
Thorpe has worked as a project manager with the East Gippsland Shire Council, Indigenous manager at Centrelink and manager at Lake Tyers Aboriginal Training Centre.

Thorpe was the co-chair of the Victorian NAIDOC Committee from 2014 to 2017.

== Bankruptcy ==
In 2013, Thorpe was declared bankrupt with over A$700,000 in debts, including monies owed to Indigenous Business Australia and A$55,000 owed to the Australian Taxation Office. She said that her bankruptcy resulted from domestic violence, stating "like many survivors of family violence, I ended up losing everything in a bid to protect myself and my family from an impossible situation". Her ex-husband, who was an alcoholic, confirmed her account of the marriage breakdown. She was discharged from bankruptcy in 2016.

== Victorian Legislative Assembly ==
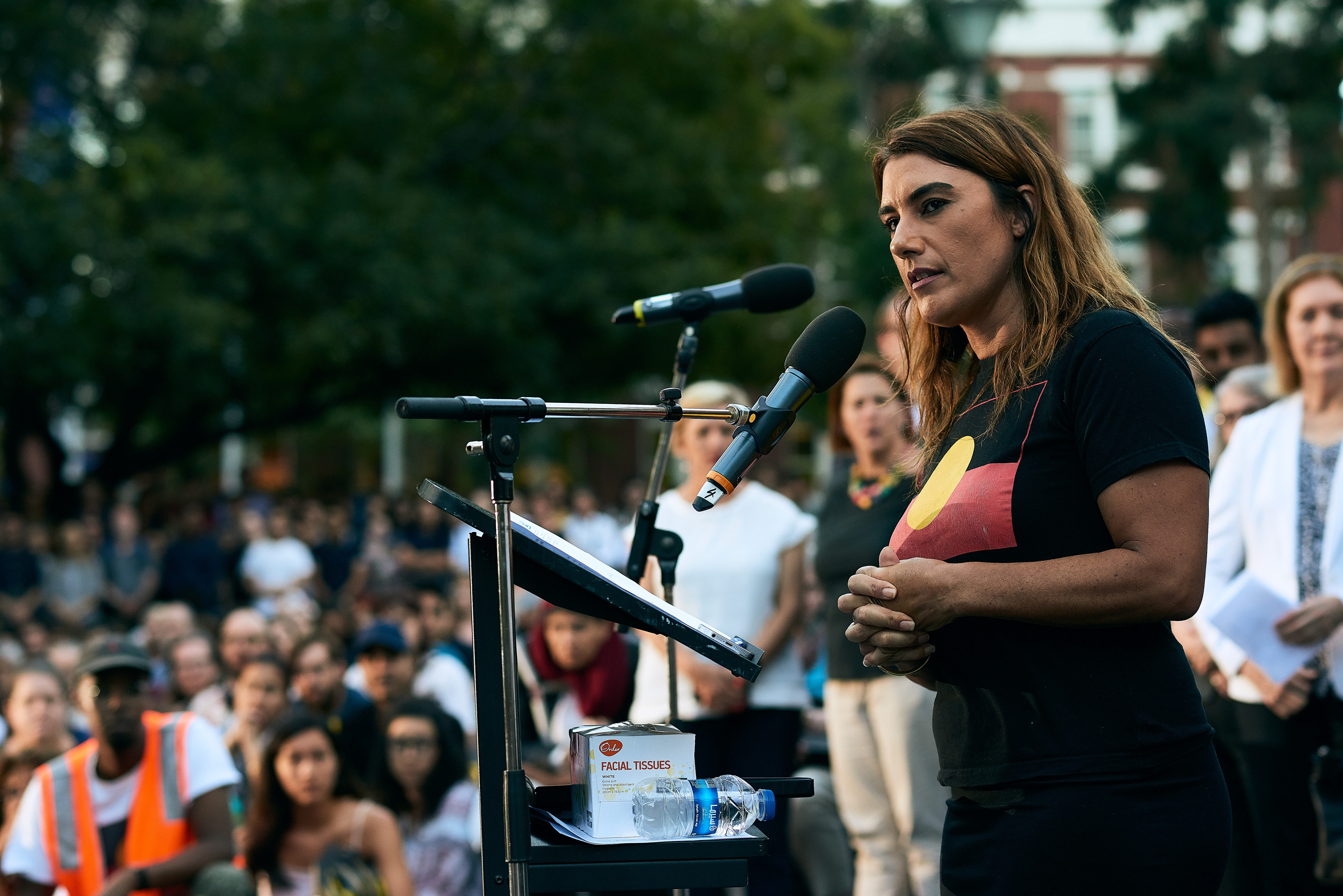
Thorpe at a rally in Melbourne in 2019

Thorpe won the seat of Northcote at the 2017 by-election on 18 November 2017 after receiving 45.22% of the primary vote, which became 50.93% after the distribution of preferences. She was sworn in as a member of parliament on 28 November 2017 and delivered her first speech to the assembly the following day. Thorpe was the Australian Greens Victoria portfolio holder for Aboriginal Justice, Consumer Affairs, Skills and Training, Sport and Mental Health.

In May 2018, she organised a historic gathering of Aboriginal Elders at the Parliament of Victoria to discuss the state's treaty processes. The meeting was organised as part of Thorpe's campaign to implement clan-based treaties, which would recognise the approximately 100 Aboriginal clans in Victoria. At the time, Thorpe said: "Our sovereignty and each of our language groups and our Clans must be clearly recognised in the government's treaty advancement legislation." The delegation of clan elders unanimously agreed to form an elders council. Thorpe supported the Victorian Government's 2018 treaty bill, but stated that she would continue to push for clan sovereignty to be recognised as the treaty process advances.

Thorpe lost her seat to Labor candidate Kat Theophanous at the 2018 Victorian state election, with her term finishing on 19 December 2018. She told ABC Radio Melbourne: "We need to have a good look at ourselves and have a review of what this election has done to our party, losing quite a considerable amount of Greens members." She said Labor ran a "dirty campaign" against her but conceded that negative coverage due to internal party scandals had also contributed to her defeat.

== Senate ==
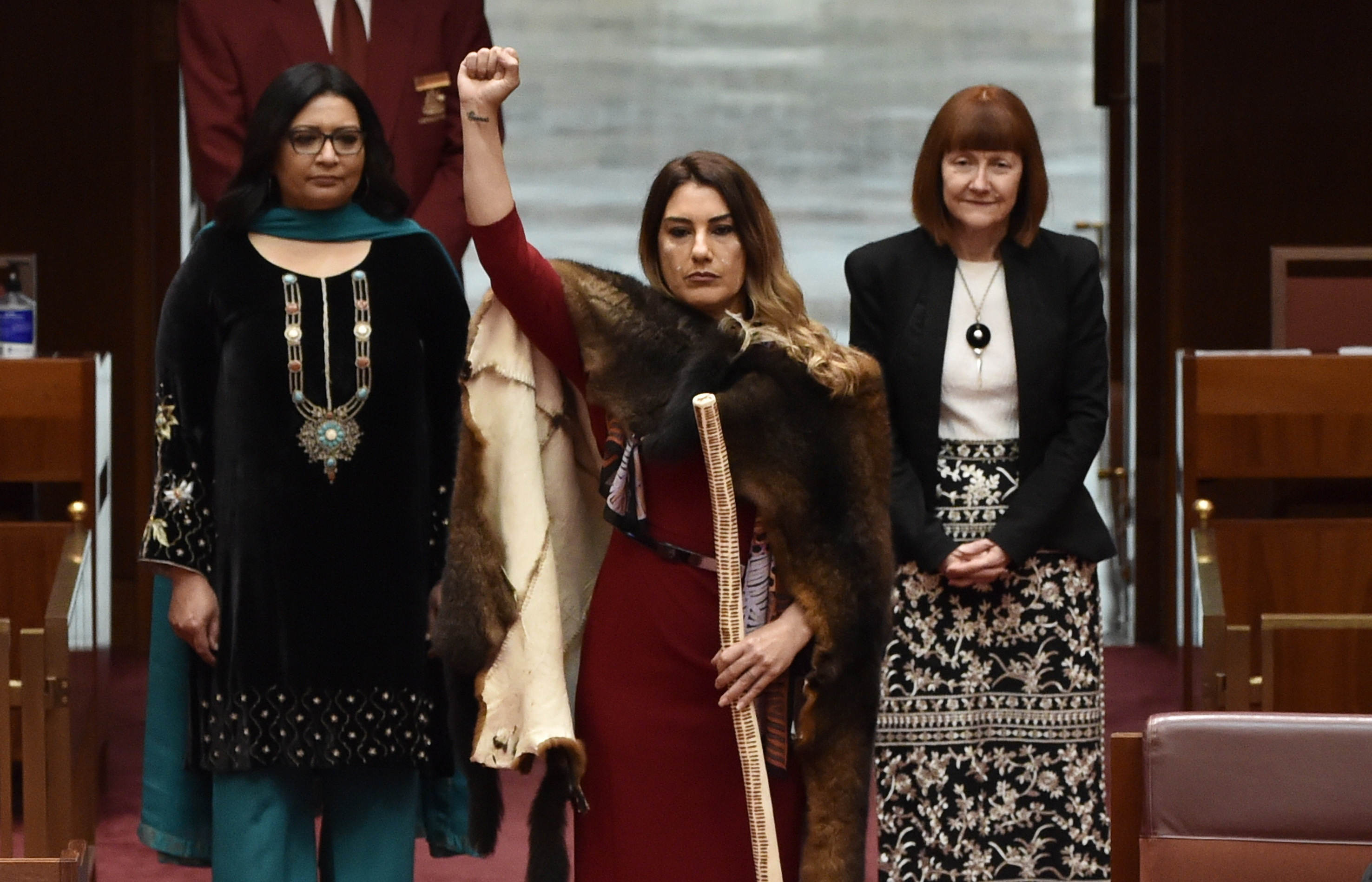
Thorpe being sworn into parliament in October 2020

In June 2020, Thorpe was preselected by Victorian Greens members to fill the federal Senate vacancy created by former leader Richard Di Natale's resignation. She was appointed to the vacancy at a joint sitting of the Victorian Parliament on 4 September and sworn in on 6 October 2020. She is the first Aboriginal woman to represent Victoria in the Senate and the first Aboriginal federal parliamentarian from the Greens.

Following the May 2022 federal election, at which she was re-elected, Thorpe was elected by the Greens party as its deputy leader in the Senate.

In a speech to Parliament in May 2021, Thorpe commented negatively on bail legislation being introduced into the Northern Territory and expressed the assumption that the Attorney-General of the Northern Territory is a white male. The Attorney-General, Selena Uibo, an Aboriginal woman, commented that Thorpe is not qualified to speak on Northern Territory issues.

In December 2021, Thorpe interjected to speaking Liberal senator Hollie Hughes the remark, "at least, I keep my legs shut", during a Senate discussion about people living with disabilities. When challenged on the remark, Thorpe told the Chamber: "I just got a view of something over there that disturbed me. But I'm happy to retract." Hughes viewed the statement as a reference to her autistic son, and was reportedly left in tears. During a debate later in the evening, Thorpe commented to Hollie Hughes that "at least I keep my legs shut". When challenged, Thorpe retracted her comment and apologised to Hughes. She said the comment was not a reference to Hughes's family.

In a June 2022 interview, Thorpe said that the parliament has "no permission to be here [in Australia]" and that she’s a parliament member "only" so she can "infiltrate" the "colonial project." She added that the Australian flag had "no permission to be" in the land. Aboriginal, conservative senator Jacinta Nampijinpa Price denounced Thorpe's comments as "divisive" and "childish," and called for her dismissal from the parliament.

In August 2022, during her swearing-in ceremony, Thorpe added the words "the colonising" in the required Oath of Allegiance to Queen Elizabeth II, saying:

I Lidia Thorpe do solemnly and sincerely affirm and declare that I will be faithful and bear true allegiance to the colonising Her Majesty Elizabeth the Second, Queen of Australia, Her heirs and successors according to law.

Thorpe was immediately criticised by fellow senators. After an instruction by Labor the President of the Australian Senate Sue Lines and interjections from others that the oath must be taken word-by-word, Thorpe recited the pledge once more, this time omitting the two words.

On 16 April 2023, footage emerged of Thorpe in a verbal altercation with men outside a Melbourne strip club. Thorpe was filmed telling a number of people they had a "small penis" and were "marked". She stated the men provoked the altercation by harassing her. The manager of the club said she provoked the incident by approaching white patrons, telling them they had "stolen her land;" he announced he was banning Thorpe from the club "for life."

During a 2023 parliamentary hearing, while questioning the allocation of funding to Northern Territory police forces, Thorpe walked out of a Senate Estimates hearing after being called a "disgrace to her people" by Labor's assistant minister for Indigenous Australians Malarndirri McCarthy, Aboriginal senator for the Northern Territory.

On 14 June 2023, during the Senate's examination of the 2021 allegations of sexual misconduct in the institution, Thorpe accused Senator David Van of sexually assaulting her in the premises. Van denied the allegation as "disgusting," "unfounded and completely untrue," though he admitted that in 2021 he had moved his office after Thorpe had submitted complaints about "his conduct in parliament". Van was expelled from the Liberal Party.

When asked about her relations with Senate colleagues, Thorpe stated she gets along well with Malcolm Roberts of One Nation and Matt Canavan of the National Party, despite Roberts and Canavan coming from the opposite end of the ideological spectrum.

=== Relationship with bikie gang ex-president ===
While holding the justice portfolio for the Greens party and serving on the joint parliamentary law-enforcement committee, Thorpe was in a relationship with Dean Martin, ex-president of the Rebels outlaw bikie gang. She had not disclosed the relationship to Greens leader Adam Bandt, who became aware of the relationship after the ABC published a report. Thorpe resigned her portfolio at Bandt's request.

On 20 October 2021, it was reported that, following a complaint from one of her staff, the Department of Finance was reviewing the "culture" of Thorpe's office.

On 24 October 2022, Thorpe referred herself to the Senate privileges committee about her relationship with Martin.

=== "Colonial system is burning" tweet ===
Following an arson attack on Old Parliament House, Canberra in December 2021, the Greens Senator shared a video of the fire taking hold at the entrance to the building, with the words: "Seems like the colonial system is burning down. Happy New Year everyone." The tweet was widely criticised. Labor MP Mark Butler said "it is beyond me how a member of the Australian parliament — who receives a salary from taxpayers — can applaud an outrageous act of vandalism on the centrepiece of Australian democracy."

=== Resignation from the Greens' deputy leadership ===
On 20 October 2022, ABC News revealed that Thorpe had been dating Martin in 2021. Thorpe resigned from her position as Greens' deputy leader in the Senate, shortly after.

Following the revelation, Thorpe faced a censure motion in the Senate. ALP senator Helen Polley, the head of the joint parliamentary law enforcement committee, of which Thorpe had been a member, said, with regard to Thorpe's position as a senator: "She should consider if it's the right place for her".

Thorpe stated she continues to be friends with Martin.

In March 2023, a parliamentary investigation cleared Thorpe of contempt of parliament. The committee found that Thorpe did not disclose any sensitive information to Martin, but stated she should have declared their relationship to avoid the perception of a conflict of interest.

=== Resignation from the Greens ===
On 6 February 2023, Thorpe announced that she would resign from the Greens to become an independent senator, sitting on the cross-bench, over disagreements concerning the proposed Indigenous Voice to Parliament. In a statement, Thorpe stated that "This country has a strong grassroots Blak Sovereign Movement, full of staunch and committed warriors and I want to represent that movement fully in this Parliament. It has become clear to me that I can't do that from within the Greens."

=== Progressive No in the 2023 Referendum ===
In 2023, Australians were invited to vote Yes or No in a referendum, titled the Indigenous Voice to Parliament, the first referendum in the country since 1999, which Prime Minister Anthony Albanese described, when introducing it, as a "gracious request" that would give Indigenous people much needed input in policies that impact their lives. (Note: The full text of the proposal for a referendum was as follows: "A proposed law: to alter the Constitution to recognise the First Peoples of Australia by establishing an Aboriginal and Torres Strait Islander Voice. Do you approve this proposed alteration?") The proposal was not met with unanimous support by Indigenous Australians. Thorpe, while condemning various "racist" voices of opposition to it, attacked the Indigenous Voice proposal as "nothing but cheap window dressing," and called it a "distraction from the keys to real change: Truth-telling and the recognition of Indigenous sovereignty." She became a "key figure" in the so-called Progressive No campaign, acknowledging that the proposal has deeply divided the Indigenous community. The referendum was held on 14 October 2023 and, with a turnout of 89.95%, the proposal was rejected by 60.06% of the voters.

=== Allegation against MP ===
In an estimates hearing held in June 2024, which examined COVID-19 stimulus funding, Thorpe asked land-council executives whether a grant equal to some $400,000 had been diverted by the Northern Land Council, which represents Aboriginals, towards building at the Twin Hill Station cattle business company a "holiday house" for Marion Scrymgour, indigenous politician and Lingiari federal MP. Thorpe's questioning during the hearing falls under parliamentary privilege, but since the senator repeated the accusation on social media, Scrymgour stated that a concerns notice would be issued to Thorpe since she intends to pursue legal action against the Victorian senator for defamation.

=== Heckle of King Charles III ===
On 21 October 2024, Thorpe heckled King Charles III by shouting "This is not your land, you are not my King" and "We want a treaty in this country. You are a genocidalist", after he finished an address at Australia's Parliament House as part of a royal visit to Australia. As she was escorted away by security, she was heard yelling "Fuck the Colony". Ngunnawal elder Aunty Violet Sheridan, who had been with the royals at an official greeting party the same day and was sitting in the Parliament House during Thorpe's protest, stated the heckling was "disrespectful" and that Lidia Thorpe does not speak for her. The heckle was also condemned by prime minister Anthony Albanese who commented that the heckling was not of the standard Australians rightly expect of parliamentarians, as well as Peter Dutton, Leader of the Opposition, who called on Thorpe to resign from the Senate.

In the aftermath of the incident, she was asked about the oath she had recited and signed during her swearing-in process, in which she had sworn allegiance to Queen Elizabeth II and "her heirs". Thorpe stated she had instead said "her hairs". Constitutional law expert Anne Twomey stated in response that the signed oath would have stated "heirs", and that the presiding officer could exclude Senator Thorpe if they believed a valid oath had not been sworn.

Simon Birmingham, leader of the opposition in the Senate, announced that the coalition is considering "legal opinions" on the validity of the senator's constitutional duty of affirmation. Thorpe, subsequently, revised her comment, stating that, when she was being sworn in as a senator, she "mispronounced" heirs as hairs, "without meaning to do so", and did not do it deliberately. In an interview, she added that "they can't get rid of me," pointing out she's "got another three and a half years [of service in the Senate]." (Note: In 2023, Thorpe stated she's set to quit politics when her term expires, citing her age as the reason. See SBS News (2023).)

On 18 November 2024, Thorpe was censured by the Australian Senate. The Senate's censure, which passed 46–12, described Thorpe's actions as "disrespectful and disruptive" and said they should disqualify her from representing the chamber as a member of any delegation. A censure motion is politically symbolic but carries no constitutional or legal weight.

=== Suspension from Senate ===
On 27 November 2024, Thorpe was suspended from the Senate for the remainder of that sitting year for "disorderly conduct" following a confrontation with One Nation's Pauline Hanson after Hanson questioned the eligibility of Fatima Payman to sit in parliament under foreign citizenship requirements. Thorpe is said to have shouted that Hanson was "a convicted racist" and thrown torn-up paper in Hanson's direction before walking out with her middle finger raised. The morning after her suspension, Thorpe entered the Senate through the press gallery and yelled "Free Palestine" with her fist raised before departing of her own accord. Thorpe also attended a rally outside the building during which she described the "disciplinary colonial actions" levelled against her as a "badge of honour" and stated that she felt the Senate was a "very violent workplace" consisting of "mainly white men in suits, who look down on people like me."

=== Burn down parliament comment ===
At a pro-Palestine rally in Melbourne in October 2025, Thorpe compared the suffering of the Palestinians during the Gaza genocide to that of Indigenous Australians and said "if I have to, I will [sic] burn down Parliament House to make a point". She received vehement criticism from politicians for the remark. The Australian Federal Police (AFP) are investigating the comments as of October 2025. Thorpe later said that her comments were "obviously not a literal threat. This mock outrage is ridiculous. While people are dying and starving in Gaza, politicians and media are once again clutching their pearls and chasing a scandal".

The Senator had previously courted controversy tweeting "the colonial system is burning down. Happy New Year everyone," following a 2021 arson attack on Old Parliament House.

== Assault ==
After The Australian published a report in October 2024 stating that Thorpe had missed 16 of the Senate’s 44 sitting days that year, she revealed that she was recovering from injuries sustained in an assault on 25 May while attending an Australian Rules Football match in Melbourne. The suspect, a 28-year-old indigenous woman, was charged, following her arrest on 25 July, with two counts of recklessly causing injury and three counts of unlawful assault at a stadium. The two women, reportedly, know each other. A police statement described the senator’s injuries from the alleged assault as minor. Thorpe stated that she had "sustained serious nerve and spinal injuries in her [sic] neck, which required spinal surgery and a plate to be inserted".

== Various roles and interests ==
Thorpe is or has been the delegate for the Lakes Entrance Aboriginal Education Consultative Group, the Victorian representative to the National Advisory Committee for The Smith Family, and co-chair of the Victorian NAIDOC Committee.

== Activist ==
Thorpe has supported the Pay the Rent campaign, which calls on non-Aboriginal Australians to voluntarily pay reparations through an organisation of the same name.

Thorpe has been critical of the Uluru Statement from the Heart, believing there should be a treaty before an Indigenous voice to government. Thorpe led a walk-out of the Uluru convention, believing that it was "hijacked by Aboriginal corporations and establishment appointments and did not reflect the aspirations of ordinary Indigenous people".

On Australia Day 2019, an inaugural dawn service organised by Thorpe was held at the Kings Domain Resting Place as a day of mourning and reflection on the colonisation of Australia with Aboriginal and non-Aboriginal people in attendance for the ceremony.

On 25 February 2023, Thorpe, after walking behind the police float that was taking part in the Sydney Gay and Lesbian Mardi Gras parade and shouting slogans against police violence, laid down in front of the float in protest against the participation of the police in the parade. The parade was temporarily halted and eventually Thorpe walked away without being arrested. A spokesman for the Sydney Mardi Gras event stated that, although they respect every individual's right to protest, her interruption of the parade had "significant implications for the safety of participants and audience."

In March 2023, footage emerged of Thorpe being tackled to the ground by a police officer while attending a demonstration outside of Parliament House. Thorpe was part of a group countering an anti-transgender rights rally at Parliament House, in which Party of Women leader and anti-transgender rights activist Kellie-Jay Keen-Minshull was taking part. Australian Attorney-General Mark Dreyfus was reported to be investigating the matter and having sought advice from the commissioner of the Australian Federal Police. Thorpe stated her treatment by the police constituted assault. The Minister for Indigenous Australians, Linda Burney, stated the incident was "disturbing and concerning."

When Thorpe's "genocide bill" was rejected by the parliament in March 2025, she stated that the move reflects the country's "colonial interests".

== Award ==
Thorpe was awarded the Fellowship for Indigenous Leadership in 2008.

== Personal life and family ==
Thorpe's grandmother, Alma Thorpe, was one of the founders of the Victorian Aboriginal Health Service in 1973, the year of Lidia's birth, and was also involved in the setting up of the Aboriginal Tent Embassy. Her mother, Marjorie Thorpe, was a co-commissioner for the Stolen Generations inquiry that produced the Bringing Them Home report in the 1990s and later a member of the Council for Aboriginal Reconciliation, and a preselected Greens federal candidate for Gippsland.

Both Alma and her mother, Edna Brown, were Koori activists in Footscray and Collingwood. Edna had been forcibly moved out of Framlingham Aboriginal Reserve in 1932, aged 15, before becoming a community activist. Edna was married to James Brown, of Scottish and Australian descent. Thorpe's sister is Meriki Onus, who co-founded the Warriors of Aboriginal Resistance (WAR) collective that was a driving force behind the Australian Aboriginal Sovereignty movement. Her uncle is activist Robbie Thorpe, who is linked to some of the earliest struggles for Aboriginal Australian self-determination, and also involved with the Pay The Rent campaign.

She became a single mother at the age of 17. She has three children, from "relationships that never lasted," and as of April 2022 four grandchildren.

Thorpe was reportedly in a relationship with Gavan McFadzean, manager of the Climate Change and Clean Energy Program at the Australian Conservation Foundation, from 2019 to 2022.

She plays Australian rules football and netball.

== Notes ==
Victorian Legislative Assembly
Preceded by Fiona Richardson	Member for Northcote; 2017–2018	Succeeded by Kat Theophanous
