= Tony Sheehan (politician) =

Australian politician (born 1948)

The Honourable Tony Sheehan

Treasurer of Victoria
- In office 21 January 1992 – 27 October 1992
- Premier: Joan Kirner
- Preceded by: Tom Roper
- Succeeded by: Alan Stockdale

Personal details
- Born: Anthony John Sheehan; 24 December 1948 (age 77) Melbourne, Victoria, Australia
- Party: Labor Party
- Spouse: Ann Charlton (m. 1978)
- Education: La Trobe University
- Occupation: Teacher

Anthony John Sheehan (born 24 December 1948) is an Australian former politician. He obtained an economics degree at La Trobe University and was a school teacher at Heidelberg High School. He was elected branch secretary of the Victorian Secondary Teachers Association.

He was a member of the Victorian Legislative Assembly from the seat of Ivanhoe (1982–85) and Northcote (1988–98). He is a member of the Labor Party.

He held a number of ministerial positions in the government of Joan Kirner. He was the Minister for Housing and Construction in 1990–91. He was then appointed the Minister for Finance in 1991–92 and Treasurer from January to October 1992 when the Kirner government was defeated. He resigned from parliament in 1998 and was succeeded in his seat by Mary Delahunty.

Victorian Legislative Assembly
| Preceded by Bruce Skeggs | Member for Ivanhoe; 1982–1985 | Succeeded by Vin Heffernan |
| Preceded by Frank Wilkes | Member for Northcote; 1988–1998 | Succeeded by Mary Delahunty |
Political offices
| Preceded by Barry Pullen | Minister for Housing and Construction; 1990–1991 | Succeeded by Andrew McCutcheon as Minister for Planning and Housing |
| New ministry | Minister for Finance; 1991–1992 | Succeeded by John Harrowfield |
| Preceded by Tom Roper | Treasurer of Victoria; 1992 | Succeeded by Alan Stockdale |
