= Mary Delahunty =

Australian politician

The Honourable Mary Delahunty

Member of the Victorian Legislative Assembly for Northcote
- In office 15 August 1998 – 24 November 2006
- Preceded by: Tony Sheehan
- Succeeded by: Fiona Richardson

Personal details
- Born: Mary Elizabeth Delahunty; 7 June 1951 (age 75) Murtoa, Victoria, Australia
- Spouse: Jock Rankin
- Relations: Hugh Delahunty (brother)
- Education: La Trobe University
- Occupation: Journalist

Mary Elizabeth Delahunty (born 7 June 1951) is an Australian journalist and former politician from the Labor Party.

== Early life ==
Delahunty was born in the Victorian town of Murtoa and educated at Loreto College in Ballarat. She earned a Bachelor of Arts in political science from La Trobe University.

== Media career ==
Delahunty was a news journalist for the ABC and Network Ten from 1975 to 1996. She appeared in news and current affairs programs such as Four Corners and The 7.30 Report. She received a Gold Walkley award for the story Aiding and Abetting which was shown and produced by Four Corners in 1983.

Aiding and Abetting was about the improper use of Australian aid money in the Philippines. In the late 1980s, Delahunty, then the chief newsreader for the ABC in Victoria, was parodied by comedian Jean Kittson on The Big Gig, where Kittson portrayed a snobbish, acid-tongued announcer called Veronica Glenhuntly (whose surname was taken from that of the elite Melbourne suburb). Delahunty was the weeknight presenter of ABC News Victoria from 1986 until 1990. She was replaced by Sue McIntosh.

== Political career ==
Delahunty was elected to the seat of Northcote in the Victorian Legislative Assembly at a 1998 by-election. Her maiden speech was about the implications of the Fitzgerald report for Victoria, especially in regard to police corruption.

Delahunty was Minister for Education from 1999 to 2002, during the term of the first Bracks Government. She was the Minister for the Arts from 1999 to 2006, Minister for Women's Affairs from 2002 to 2006, and Minister for Planning from 2002 to 2005. As Minister for Planning, she was responsible for the media presentation of Melbourne 2030.

As Minister for Planning, Delahunty was criticised for the altering of the annual Surveyor-General's Report 2002–03, submitted by the Surveyor-General of Victoria, Keith Clifford Bell. The acting Victorian Ombudsman announced in January 2004 that he would "investigate why the former Surveyor-General's final annual report was substantially altered before being tabled in State Parliament last November" He also announced he would investigate the misuse of the Surveyor-General's electronic signature by the Department of Sustainability and Environment. The Auditor-General confirmed it would keep a watching brief over the investigations. It was also confirmed that the government ignored the advice of the office of the Victorian Government Solicitor "to not interfere with the report". Bell, himself had confirmed that the report had been altered. The complaint to the ombudsman leading to the investigation had come from the then opposition planning spokesman Ted Baillieu. Efforts to alter or block Bell's reports from 1999-2000 and 2000–01, had also occurred under the former Minister Sherryl Garbutt. Garbutt had made claims the reports were inaccurate, but they were subsequently tabled without any alteration.

The ombudsman's investigation found substantial sections altered after Bell had finished his term as Surveyor-General. It also found that Bell's signature was assigned to the Annual Report 2002-03 of the Surveyors Board of Victoria, without his knowledge or consent. The government was directed to apologise to Bell. Shadow Planning Minister, Ted Baillieu, in his statement to the Parliament on 9 April 2003 reported on the political interference at multiple levels, including the Planning Minister, in the performance of the responsibilities of the Surveyor-General. Bell was acknowledged as a competent, highly respected public servant and he was held in the highest esteem by both the surveying profession and the business sector. In a further statement to Parliament on 4 May 2005, Baillieu commented on the "doctoring" of Bell's report, which had been done at the Minister's direction. Baillieu further cited the Ombudsman's findings that the altering of the report was inappropriate and there were concerns regarding the adequacy of the investigations. It was claimed that then Planning Minister Delahunty had misled the Parliament. The tabled report bears the hand-written note signed by Bell's successor: "Amended by the direction of the Minister. John E.Tulloch Surveyor General of Victoria 19/4/2005”.

Previously, in 2002, the Auditor-General reviewed the functions and responsibilities of the Surveyor-General and agreed with reports submitted by Bell. The Auditor-General identified the interference by Land Victoria in the performance of the Surveyor-General's responsibilities, including the wrongful transfer of the Surveyor-General's responsibilities to business units of Land Victoria outside of the Office of Surveyor-General. He confirmed that such responsibilities cannot be transferred without legislative mandate. The Auditor-General found that the transfer of the functions of the Surveyor-General had seen them delivered unsatisfactorily and did not meet the obligations of the legislation. The Opposition blamed Delahunty and her predecessor Sherryl Garbutt, for alleged political interference in the performance of the Surveyor-General's responsibilities. Such interference included: attempts to block or alter annual reports from Bell; affix his electronic signature without his knowledge or permission; threats and intimidation by the former executive director of Land Victoria Elizabeth O'Keeffe; hiring of private investigators to investigate Bell and his office; and efforts to interfere with his review of State electoral boundaries in his capacity as an Electoral Boundaries Commissioner.

In January 2005 Premier Bracks dumped Delahunty as Planning Minister. Rob Hulls replaced Delahunty in what the media reported as an "increasingly controversial" ministerial portfolio. Delahunty commented in the media that in late February 2005 "she picked up The Sunday Age to read that members of the ruling Right faction of the ALP wanted her out of her safe seat." In October 2006, Delahunty advised that she would not contest the November 2006 election due to health and family reasons.

== Personal life ==
Delahunty is the sister of Victorian National Party MP, Hugh Delahunty, who is also a former Victorian Football League player, as is another brother, Michael. Her husband of 22 years, the journalist Jock Rankin, died in 2002. She has two children, Nicholas and Olivia. She was a guest on Life Matters (ABC Radio National, 26 August 2010) on such topics as grief, parenting, civic participation and public life, and her memoir, Public Life, Private Grief.

== Bibliography ==
=== Non-fiction ===
- Delahunty, Mary. Gravity : inside the PM's office during her last year and final days. Hardie Grant Books.

=== Critical studies and reviews of Delahunty's work ===
- Deane, Joel (September 2014). "'Gendered, pornographic, violent' : the making of a new Labor martyr". Australian Book Review. 364: 20–21. Review of Gravity.

Victorian Legislative Assembly
Preceded by Tony Sheehan	Member for Northcote; 1998–2006	Succeeded by Fiona Richardson
Media offices
Preceded by Geoff Raymond	ABC News Victoria; Weeknight presenter 1986–1990	Succeeded by Sue McIntosh
