= Fiona Richardson =

Australian politician

The Honourable Fiona Richardson
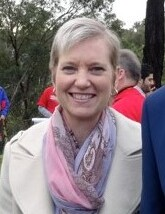
- Richardson in 2014

Member of the Victorian Legislative Assembly for Northcote
- In office 25 November 2006 – 23 August 2017
- Preceded by: Mary Delahunty
- Succeeded by: Lidia Thorpe

Personal details
- Born: Fiona Catherine Alison Richardson; 22 November 1966 Dar es Salaam, Tanzania
- Died: 23 August 2017 (aged 50) Melbourne, Victoria, Australia
- Party: Labor Party
- Spouse: Stephen Newnham
- Education: University of Melbourne

Fiona Catherine Alison Richardson (22 November 1966 – 23 August 2017) was an Australian politician. She was a Labor Party member of the Victorian Legislative Assembly from 2006 until her death in 2017, representing the electorate of Northcote. She was Minister for Women and Minister for Prevention of Family Violence in the First Andrews Ministry from December 2014 until her death.

== Early life and career ==
Richardson was born in Dar es Salaam, Tanzania and was educated at Methodist Ladies College, Kew and the University of Melbourne, where she graduated in 1989 majoring in politics and psychology. She was then a researcher of ocular trauma at the Royal Victorian Eye and Ear Hospital.

== Political career ==
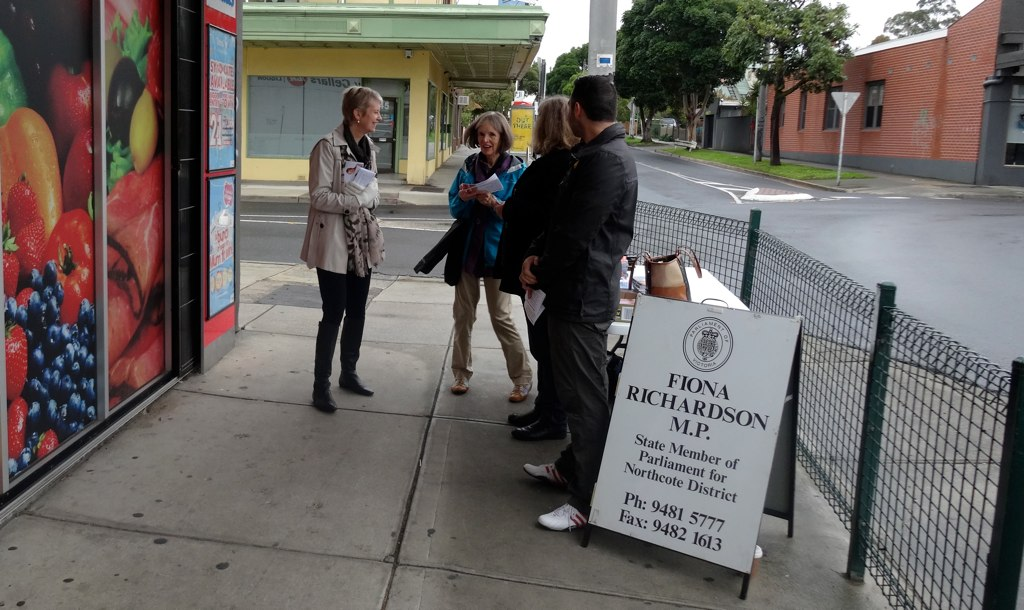
Richardson (left) meeting with constituents in Miller street, Thornbury

Richardson joined the Australian Labor Party in 1991, and was an adviser to numerous state and federal members of parliament. She was the secretary of the right-wing Labor Unity faction from 2000 to 2007. Richardson was elected to the Victorian Legislative Assembly in November 2006 representing the electorate of Northcote. She replaced the retiring Arts Minister Mary Delahunty. She was appointed Parliamentary Secretary for Education and served in that position until August 2007, when she became a Parliamentary Secretary for Treasury and Finance.

Richardson was seen as a key player in protecting husband Stephen Newnham as state secretary during a debilitating struggle within the Right faction over control of ALP head office during 2008 and 2009. Newnham eventually left the role in September 2009 after losing the support of the Premier John Brumby.

After the Labor government's defeat in the 2010 Victorian state election Richardson was appointed as the Victorian Labor Party's spokesperson for public transport. Due to her ill health, her responsibilities were reduced in a December 2013 reshuffle of the opposition shadow cabinet, and she took responsibility for small business and innovation.

When Labor was returned to government in 2014, Richardson was made Minister for Women and Minister for Prevention of Family Violence in the Andrews Ministry. Richardson oversaw the establishment of the Victorian Royal Commission into Family Violence in 2015, which tabled its report to Parliament in 2016.

== Personal life ==
Richardson was married to former ALP state secretary Stephen Newnham and they had two children.

On 25 June 2013, it was announced that she had been diagnosed with breast cancer. She went into remission and returned to parliament.

On 7 August 2017, Richardson announced she was taking medical leave from parliament. On 22 August 2017, she said she would be extending her leave after being diagnosed with several tumours and would retire at the next election, but she died the next day, 23 August 2017, aged 50.

Victorian Legislative Assembly
Preceded by Mary Delahunty	Member for Northcote; 2006–2017	Succeeded by Lidia Thorpe
Political offices
Preceded by Heidi Victoria as Minister for Women's Affairs	Minister for Women; 2014–2017	Succeeded by Natalie Hutchins
Ministry created	Minister for Prevention of Family Violence; 2014–2017	Succeeded by Natalie Hutchins
