= Electoral district of Northcote =

State electoral district of Victoria, Australia

Northcote Victoria—Legislative Assembly
- Interactive map of electoral district boundaries from the 2022 state election
- State: Victoria
- Created: 1927
- MP: Kat Theophanous
- Party: Labor
- Namesake: Suburb of Northcote
- Electors: 48,831 (2018)
- Area: 21 km^{2} (8.1 sq mi)
- Demographic: Metropolitan
- Coordinates: 37°46′12″S 145°0′36″E

The electoral district of Northcote /ˈnɔːθkət/ is an electoral district of the Victorian Legislative Assembly. It covers the suburbs of Alphington, Fairfield, Northcote, Thornbury, and part of Preston. It lies on the northern bank of the Yarra River between the Merri and Darebin creeks.

The seat was created in 1927 as a replacement for Jika Jika, and has been a safe Labor seat for most of its existence. It has only been held by seven members. The seat's most historically prominent member is 34th Premier John Cain (senior). Upon Cain's death in 1957, he was succeeded by Frank Wilkes, who went on to become state Labor leader from 1977 to 1981.

Former ABC newsreader Mary Delahunty was elected in a 1998 by-election. As the electorate was safe for the Labor Party, the Liberals declined to nominate a candidate. However, partly due to the presence of a One Nation candidate, the Liberals took the unusual step of campaigning for the Australian Democrats, issuing a 'How to Vote Liberal' card which advocated voting Democrat, and then Premier Jeff Kennett also wrote to voters urging them to vote Democrat.

While the law has since been changed stopping political parties campaigning directly for other political parties, that the seat has been traditionally safe for Labor has meant the Liberals have often run dead. Since the turn of the millennium, they have often been pushed into third place on the primary vote, allowing other parties, like the Greens in 2002, to become the main challengers to Labor. The Greens eventually won the seat in a 2017 by-election following the death of Labor member Fiona Richardson. However, Labor regained the seat at the following election in 2018.

== Members for Northcote ==
Member	Party	Term
John Cain (senior)	Labor	1927–1957
Frank Wilkes	Labor	1957–1988
Tony Sheehan	Labor	1988–1998
Mary Delahunty	Labor	1998–2006
Fiona Richardson	Labor	2006–2017
Lidia Thorpe	Greens	2017–2018
Kat Theophanous	Labor	2018–present

== Election results ==
2022 Victorian state election: Northcote
Party	Candidate	Votes	%	±%
Labor	Kat Theophanous	17,303	40.6	−1.1
Greens	Campbell Gome	12,797	30.0	−9.5
Liberal	Stewart Todhunter	5,205	12.2	+1.5
Victorian Socialists	Kath Larkin	2,776	6.5	+6.5
Reason	April Clarke	1,539	3.6	+0.2
Animal Justice	Tim Oseckas	757	1.8	−0.7
Freedom	Anastacia Ntouni	729	1.7	+1.7
Liberal Democrats	Anthony Cave	530	1.2	+0.1
Independent	Adrian Whitehead	518	1.2	+1.2
Family First	Kathrine Ashton	408	0.9	+0.9
Independent	Ashish Verma	80	0.2	+0.2
Total formal votes		42,642	94.5	−1.1
Informal votes		2,445	5.4	+1.1
Turnout		45,087	89.5	+0.4
Notional two-party-preferred count
Labor	Kat Theophanous	34,840	81.7	−1.5
Liberal	Stewart Todhunter	7,802	18.3	+1.5
Two-candidate-preferred result
Labor	Kat Theophanous	21,413	50.2	−1.5
Greens	Campbell Gome	21,229	49.8	+1.5
Labor hold		Swing	−1.5	
