= Results of the 2018 Victorian state election (Legislative Council) =

Australian state election results

2018 Victorian state election (Legislative Council)
- 24 November 2018

All 40 seats in the Victorian Legislative Council 20 seats needed for a majority
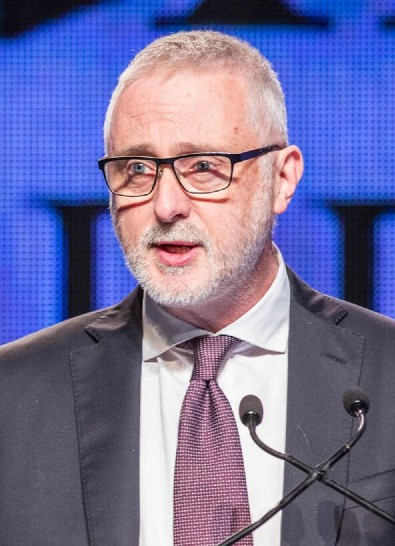

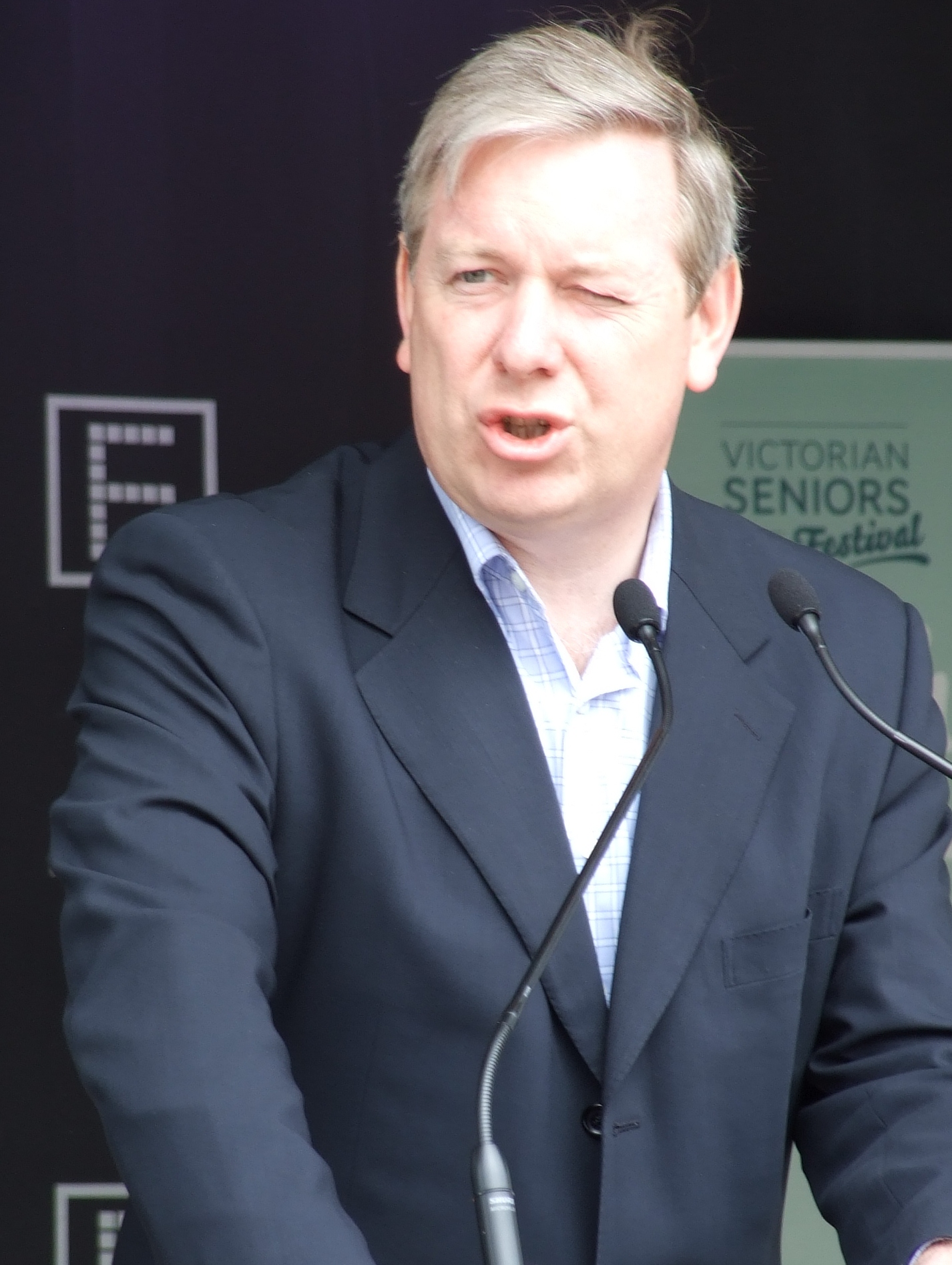

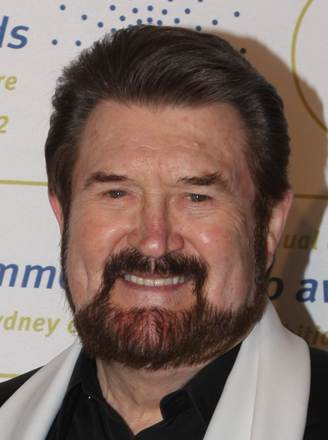

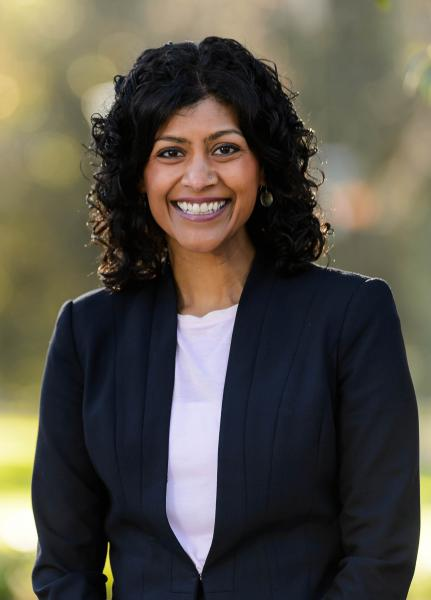

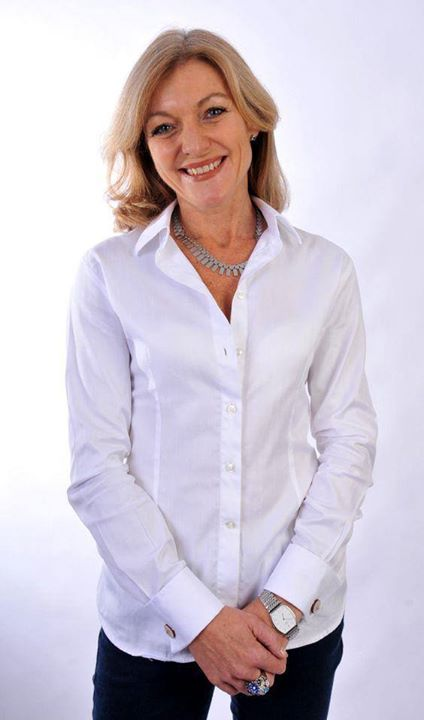

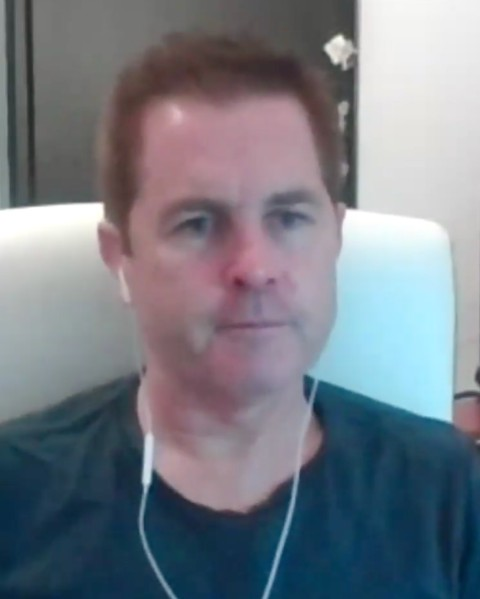
	First party	Second party	Third party
Leader	Gavin Jennings	David Davis	Derryn Hinch
Party	Labor	Liberal–National coalition	Justice
Alliance			MPA
Leader's seat	South-Eastern Metro	Southern Metro	Did not contest (Note: Derryn Hinch led the party while sitting in the Australian Senate as a senator from Victoria, and he did not contest the state election.)
Seats before	14	16	0
Seats won	18	11	3
Seat change	▲4	▼5	▲3
Primary vote	1,406,122	1,054,980	134,413
Percentage	39.22%	29.42%	3.75%
Swing	▲5.76pp	▼6.71pp	New
	Fourth party	Fifth party	Sixth party
	LDP		SFF
Leader	None	Samantha Ratnam	None
Party	Liberal Democrats	Greens	SFF
Alliance	MPA		MPA
Leader's seat	N/A	Northern Metro	N/A
Seats before	0	3	2
Seats won	2	1	1
Seat change	▲2	▼2	▼1
Primary vote	89,441	331,751	108,312
Percentage	2.49%	9.25%	3.02%
Swing	▼0.57pp	▼1.50pp	▲1.37pp
	Seventh party	Eighth party	Ninth party
	AJP
Leader	None	Fiona Patten	William Bourke
Party	Animal Justice	Reason	Sustainable
Alliance	MPA		MPA
Leader's seat	N/A	Northern Metro	Did not contest
Seats before	0	1	0
Seats won	1	1	1
Seat change	▲1	Steady	▲1
Primary vote	88,530	49,008	29,866
Percentage	2.47%	1.37%	0.83%
Swing	▲0.77pp	▼1.26pp	▲0.83pp

This is a list of Legislative Council results for the 2018 Victorian state election.

The Liberal Democratic Party and Animal Justice Party would win their first seat in the Legislative Council. The party's would win a seat at every election since.

== Results by region ==
=== Eastern Metropolitan ===
The Liberal Party were defending three seats while the Greens and Labor were defending one each.

2018 Victorian state election: Eastern Metropolitan
Party	Candidate	Votes	%	±%
Quota		69,756		
Labor	1. Shaun Leane (elected 1); 2. Sonja Terpstra (elected 3); 3. Nildhara Gadani; 4. Abhimanyu Kumar; 5. Barry Terzic	154,716	36.97	+8.30
Liberal	1. Mary Wooldridge (elected 2); 2. Bruce Atkinson (elected 4); 3. Emanuele Cicchiello; 4. Grace Roy; 5. Shilpa Hegde	151,216	36.13	−9.59
Greens	1. Samantha Dunn; 2. Helen Harris; 3. Liezl Shnookal; 4. Monique Edwards; 5. Daniela Tymms	37,650	8.99	−1.49
Liberal Democrats	1. Brenton Ford; 2. Marcos Fernandes	17,452	4.17	+2.83
Justice	1. Linda De Rango; 2. Kathryn Lavell	10,583	2.53	+2.53
Animal Justice	1. Rosemary Lavin; 2. Theresa Weymouth	10,031	2.40	+0.69
Democratic Labour	1. Jeremy Orchard; 2. Benjamin Cronshaw	7,097	1.70	−0.59
Shooters, Fishers, Farmers	1. Monique Ruyter; 2. Grant Poulton	5,245	1.25	+0.42
Reason	1. Douglas Leitch; 2. Glenn Lynch	4,996	1.19	−0.86
Voluntary Euthanasia	1. Dermot Ryan; 2. Tara Nipe	3,722	0.89	−0.19
Sustainable Australia	1. Lynnette Saloumi; 2. Perrin Wilkins	3,400	0.81	+0.81
Transport Matters	1. Rod Barton (elected 5); 2. Toni Peters	2,590	0.62	+0.62
Health Australia	1. Andrew Hicks; 2. Gabrielle Brodie	2,426	0.58	+0.58
Aussie Battler	1. Bryce Larson; 2. Clyde Sterry	2,231	0.53	+0.53
Liberty Alliance	1. Indhira Bivieca Aquino; 2. Royston Wilding	1,930	0.46	+0.46
Victorian Socialists	1. Norrian Rundle; 2. Liam Ward	1,887	0.45	+0.45
Country	1. Mil Erikozu; 2. Russel Proud	1184	0.28	−0.14
Hudson for Northern Victoria	1. Shelley van Luenen; 2. Deidre Bailey	176	0.04	+0.04
Total formal votes		418,532	96.88	−0.31
Informal votes		13,484	3.12	+0.31
Turnout		432,016	91.68	−2.04

=== Eastern Victoria ===
Labor and the Liberal/National coalition were defending two seats each and the Shooters, Fishers and Farmers were defending one.

2018 Victorian state election: Eastern Victoria
Party	Candidate	Votes	%	±%
Quota		77,936		
Liberal/National Coalition	1. Edward O'Donohue (elected 1); 2. Melina Bath (elected 3); 3. Meg Edwards; 4. Karen Chipperfield; 5. Darren Howe	159,520	34.10	−7.47
Labor	1. Jane Garrett (elected 2); 2. Harriet Shing (elected 4); 3. Patrick Kelly; 4. Jane Clarke; 5. Onno van den Eynde	157,020	33.58	+4.58
Greens	1. Tom Cummings; 2. Lachlan Mackenzie; 3. Neale Adams; 4. David Gentle; 5. Donald Stokes	31,467	6.73	−1.75
Shooters, Fishers, Farmers	1. Jeff Bourman (elected 5); 2. Kerrie-Anne Muir	23,409	5.01	+2.57
Justice	1. Rhonda Crooks; 2. Philip Seabrook	20,925	4.47	+4.47
Liberal Democrats	1. Ben Buckley; 2. Rob McCathie	18,856	4.03	−0.71
Animal Justice	1. Leah Folloni; 2. Jennifer McAdam	15,095	3.23	+3.23
Democratic Labour	1. Padraig O'Hea; 2. Larry Norman	7,067	1.51	+0.80
Voluntary Euthanasia	1. Michelle Hain; 2. Martin Barnes	6,222	1.33	+0.12
Aussie Battler	1. Vern Hughes; 2. Paula Mattson	5,685	1.21	+1.21
Health Australia	1. Geoff Pain; 2. Katherine Holmes	4,155	0.89	+0.89
Sustainable Australia	1. Reade Smith; 2. Donna Hannaford	4,092	0.87	+0.87
Reason	1. Carmel Close; 2. Gregory Bell	3,806	0.81	−1.68
Country	1. Rob Danieli; 2. Tony Geitenbeek	3,182	0.68	−0.30
Liberty Alliance	1. Mark Brown; 2. Daniel Jones	2,652	0.57	+0.57
Transport Matters	1. Trevor Salmon; 2. Joshua Roperto	2,622	0.56	+0.56
Victorian Socialists	1. Lainie Cruse; 2. Russell Forden	1,017	0.22	+0.22
Independent	1. Michael Fozard	499	0.11	+0.11
Hudson for Northern Victoria	1. Megan Whittaker; 2. Kristy Hudson	320	0.07	+0.07
Total formal votes		467,611	96.21	+1.48
Informal votes		18,419	3.79	−1.48
Turnout		486,030	91.08	+0.02

=== Northern Metropolitan ===
The Labor Party were defending two seats, while the Liberals, Greens and Sex Party (now Reason Party) were defending one each.

2018 Victorian state election: Northern Metropolitan
Party	Candidate	Votes	%	±%
Quota		75,040		
Labor	1. Jenny Mikakos (elected 1); 2. Nazih Elasmar (elected 2); 3. Burhan Yigit; 4. Ash Verma; 5. Karen Douglas	191,850	42.57	+2.18
Greens	1. Samantha Ratnam (elected 3); 2. Christina Zigouras; 3. Edward Crossland; 4. Josef Rafalowicz; 5. Campbell Gome	75,384	16.73	−1.83
Liberal	1. Craig Ondarchie (elected 4); 2. Evan Mulholland; 3. Neelam Rai; 4. Kate Drake; 5. Mark Polistena	74,179	16.46	−5.40
Victorian Socialists	1. Stephen Jolly; 2. Sue Bolton; 3. Colleen Bolger	18,899	4.19	+4.19
Democratic Labour	1. John McBride; 2. Jackie Gwynne	18,783	4.17	+1.23
Reason	1. Fiona Patten (elected 5); 2. Helena Melton; 3. Ange Hopkins; 4. Rachel Payne; 5. Dominique Musico	15,197	3.37	+0.50
Animal Justice	1. Bruce Poon; 2. Miranda Smith; 3. Chris Delforce	9,123	2.02	+0.51
Justice	1. Carmela Dagiandis; 2. Prudence Mercieca	9,112	2.02	+2.02
Liberal Democrats	1. Louise Hitchcock; 2. Richard Wright	6,185	1.37	−0.11
Shooters, Fishers, Farmers	1. Ethan Constantinou; 2. Chris Tzelepis	5,388	1.20	+0.11
Vote 1 Local Jobs	1. Nathan Purcell; 2. Aaron Purcell	5,351	1.19	+0.83
Aussie Battler	1. Walter Mikac; 2. David Graham	4,470	0.99	+0.99
Health Australia	1. Pippa Campbell; 2. Emily Oldmeadow	3,703	0.82	+0.82
Voluntary Euthanasia	1. Sandra McCarthy; 2. Stefan Nott	3,681	0.82	+0.52
Sustainable Australia	1. Mark McDonald; 2. William Clow	3,103	0.69	+0.69
Transport Matters	1. Moti Ram Visa; 2. Afshan Mian	2,682	0.60	+0.60
Liberty Alliance	1. Russell Gomez; 2. John Reisner	1,708	0.38	+0.38
Country	1. Cameron Stoddart; 2. Domenic Greco	1,604	0.36	+0.20
Hudson for Northern Victoria	1. Madison Wright; 2. Marylynn Meneghini	228	0.05	+0.05
Total formal votes		450,239	95.20	+0.47
Informal votes		22,717	4.80	−0.47
Turnout		472,956	88.01	−3.05

=== Northern Victoria ===
The Liberal/National coalition and Labor Party were defending two seats each, and Shooters, Fishers and Farmers were defending one seat.

2018 Victorian state election: Northern Victoria
Party	Candidate	Votes	%	±%
Quota		76,118		
Labor	1. Mark Gepp (elected 1); 2. Jaclyn Symes (elected 5); 3. Sukhraj Singh; 4. Jan Morgiewicz; 5. Glenn Matthews	145,408	31.83	+5.45
Liberal/National Coalition	1. Wendy Lovell (elected 2); 2. Luke O'Sullivan; 3. Brad Hearn; 4. Emma Williamson; 5. Robyne Head	142,566	31.20	−9.97
Shooters, Fishers, Farmers	1. Daniel Young; 2. Ben Podger	35,871	7.85	+4.35
Greens	1. Nicole Rowan; 2. Damien Stevens-Todd; 3. Elizabeth Matchett; 4. Julie Rivendell; 5. Matthew Thomas	30,022	6.57	−1.11
Justice	1. Tania Maxwell (elected 4); 2. Jodi Ayres	22,201	4.86	+4.86
Liberal Democrats	1. Tim Quilty (elected 3); 2. Iain King	17,286	3.78	+1.43
Animal Justice	1. Glynn Jarrett; 2. Robyn Masih	10,473	2.29	+0.52
Voluntary Euthanasia	1. Miranda Jones; 2. Craig Hill	9,182	2.01	+2.01
Country	1. Phil Larkin; 2. David Couston	7,961	1.74	−0.75
Democratic Labour	1. Chris McCormack; 2. Jarred Vehlen	6,639	1.45	−2.71
Aussie Battler	1. Dennis Lacey; 2. Erin Bruhn	6,471	1.42	+1.42
Health Australia	1. Isaac Golden; 2. Anne Sash	4,426	0.97	+0.97
Sustainable Australia	1. Madeleine Wearne; 2. Ian Chivers	4,127	0.90	+0.90
Hudson for Northern Victoria	1. Josh Hudson; 2. Shane O'Sullivan	4,121	0.90	+0.90
Liberty Alliance	1. Ewan McDonald; 2. James Wylie	3,732	0.82	+0.82
Reason	1. Martin Leahy; 2. Callum Chapman	3,176	0.70	−2.57
Transport Matters	1. Scott Cowie; 2. Eleanore Fitz	1,909	0.42	+0.42
Victorian Socialists	1. Moira Macdonald; 2. Michael McKenna	1,327	0.29	+0.29
Total formal votes		456,706	96.03	−1.22
Informal votes		18,905	3.97	+1.22
Turnout		475,611	90.75	−3.06

=== South Eastern Metropolitan ===
Liberal and Labor were defending two seats each. The Greens were defending one.

2018 Victorian state election: South Eastern Metropolitan
Party	Candidate	Votes	%	±%
Quota		72,830		
Labor	1. Gavin Jennings (elected 1); 2. Adem Somyurek (elected 2); 3. Tien Kieu (elected 4); 4. Nessie Sayar; 5. Ian Spencer	218,209	49.93	+9.83
Liberal	1. Gordon Rich-Phillips (elected 3); 2. Inga Peulich; 3. George Hua; 4. Kuldeep Kaur; 5. Robert Hicks	126,615	28.97	−6.24
Greens	1. Nina Springle; 2. Matthew Kirwan; 3. Jacqueline Mitchell; 4. Jake Vos; 5. Tasma Minifie	24,390	5.58	−0.71
Justice	1. Peter Davy; 2. Kerri Guy	13,265	3.03	+3.03
Animal Justice	1. Elizabeth Johnston; 2. Derrin Craig	9,727	2.23	+0.37
Democratic Labour	1. Peter Stevens; 2. Michael Palma	6,396	1.46	−0.76
Shooters, Fishers, Farmers	1. Chris Banhidy; 2. Vincent Leone	6,326	1.45	+0.21
Transport Matters	1. Ali Khan; 2. Chetan Sharma; 3. Roona Fazal; 4. Inderpal Singh; 5. Deepakbir Kaur	5,553	1.27	+1.27
Health Australia	1. Tamsin King; 2. Carly Meaden	3,722	0.85	+0.85
Reason	1. Laura Chipp; 2. Brett Kagan	3,719	0.85	−1.82
Liberal Democrats	1. David Limbrick (elected 5); 2. Matt Ford	3,681	0.84	−0.89
Sustainable Australia	1. Anthony Cresswell; 2. Daryl Budgeon	3,028	0.69	+0.69
Voluntary Euthanasia	1. Kassandra Hall; 2. Mardi Hill	3,019	0.69	+0.12
Aussie Battler	1. David Armstrong; 2. Michael Chamberlain	2,822	0.65	+0.65
Liberty Alliance	1. David Maddison; 2. Ralf Schumann	2,314	0.53	+0.53
Independent	1. Tarang Chawla; 2. Nicole Lee	1,441	0.33	+0.33
Victorian Socialists	1. Aran Mylvaganam; 2. Ben Reid	1,239	0.28	+0.28
Country	1. Andrew Hepner; 2. Marilyn Danieli	1,202	0.28	+0.28
Hudson for Northern Victoria	1. Jannette Sinclair; 2. Holly Madill	402	0.09	+0.09
Independent	1. Stewart Hine	62	0.01	+0.01
Independent	1. Bobby Singh	49	0.01	+0.01
Independent	1. Peter Mack	27	0.01	+0.01
Total formal votes		436,977	95.86	−0.25
Informal votes		18,962	4.16	+0.25
Turnout		455,939	89.77	−3.10

=== Southern Metropolitan ===
The Liberals were defending three seats, and Labor and the Greens were defending one each.

2018 Victorian state election: Southern Metropolitan
Party	Candidate	Votes	%	±%
Quota		71,610		
Liberal	1. David Davis (elected 1); 2. Georgie Crozier (elected 3); 3. Margaret Fitzherbert; 4. Gavan MacRides; 5. Miaosheng Yang	164,607	38.29	−4.43
Labor	1. Philip Dalidakis (elected 2); 2. Nina Taylor (elected 4); 3. Judith Armstrong; 4. Graeme Kendall; 5. Danny Bellote	148,656	34.58	+9.38
Greens	1. Sue Pennicuik; 2. Earl James; 3. Rose Read; 4. Duncan Forster; 5. James Bennett	57,849	13.46	−2.08
Animal Justice	1. Ben Schultz; 2. Fiona McRostie	9,315	2.17	+0.52
Reason	1. Jill Mellon-Robertson; 2. Edmund Munday	8,587	2.00	−0.43
Justice	1. Nikki Nicholls; 2. Julie Doidge	6,178	1.44	+1.44
Liberal Democrats	1. Robert Kennedy; 2. Kirsty O'Sullivan	5,940	1.38	−3.23
Sustainable Australia	1. Clifford Hayes (elected 5); 2. Cathryn Houghton	5,695	1.32	+1.32
Democratic Labour	1. Joel van der Horst; 2. Lucia De Summa	5,684	1.32	−0.85
Voluntary Euthanasia	1. Jane Morris; 2. Imelda Ryan	4,364	1.02	+0.23
Shooters, Fishers, Farmers	1. Nicole Bourman; 2. Ryan Lindfors-Beswick	2,726	0.63	+0.16
Liberty Alliance	1. Avi Yemini; 2. Kaylah Jones	2,096	0.49	+0.49
Health Australia	1. Ben Moore; 2. Cindy Cerecer	2,055	0.48	+0.48
Victorian Socialists	1. Catheryn Lewis; 2. Ivan Mitchell	2,046	0.48	+0.48
Aussie Battler	1. Mark Hillard; 2. Stacey Wain	1,700	0.40	+0.40
Transport Matters	1. Kim Guest; 2. Saeed Muhammad	1,375	0.32	+0.32
Country	1. Nicola Clow; 2. Michele Armstrong	711	0.17	+0.08
Hudson for Northern Victoria	1. Matthew Perriam; 2. Grace Perriam	342	0.08	+0.08
Total formal votes		429,657	97.33	−0.10
Informal votes		11,801	2.67	+0.10
Turnout		441458	89.31	−2.56

=== Western Metropolitan ===
Labor were defending two seats. Liberals, Greens and Democratic Labour were defending one each.

2018 Victorian state election: Western Metropolitan
Party	Candidate	Votes	%	±%
Quota		77,210		
Labor	1. Cesar Melhem (elected 1); 2. Ingrid Stitt (elected 2); 3. Kaushaliya Vaghela (elected 4); 4. Kirsten Psaila; 5. Louise Persse	214,279	46.25	+2.27
Liberal	1. Bernie Finn (elected 3); 2. Dinesh Gourisetty; 3. Moira Deeming; 4. David Wood; 5. Nathan Di Noia	98,458	21.25	−2.32
Greens	1. Huong Truong; 2. Emely Cash; 3. Bernadette Thomas; 4. Elena Pereyra; 5. Annie Chessells-Beeby	40,417	8.72	−1.61
Justice	1. Catherine Cumming (elected 5); 2. Daniel Cumming	31,615	6.82	+6.82
Democratic Labour	1. Walter Villagonzalo; 2. Mark Royal	16,378	3.54	+0.97
Animal Justice	1. Terri Beech; 2. Karina Leung	12,028	2.60	+1.08
Shooters, Fishers, Farmers	1. Wayne Rigg; 2. Geoff Ashby	8,914	1.92	+0.68
Liberal Democrats	1. Adam Karlovsky; 2. Mark Thompson; 3. Christopher Reeves	7,938	1.71	−3.82
Reason	1. Chris Botha; 2. Jamie Twidale	5,337	1.15	−1.55
Aussie Battler	1. Stuart O'Neill; 2. Ian Kearns	4,406	0.95	+0.95
Health Australia	1. Briony Jenkinson; 2. Deanne Glenn	4,354	0.94	+0.94
Voluntary Euthanasia	1. Joan Beckwith; 2. Nia Sims	3,752	0.81	+0.81
Sustainable Australia	1. Allan Doensen; 2. Richard Belcher	3,513	0.76	+0.76
Liberty Alliance	1. Francine Cohen; 2. Terri Franklin	3,294	0.71	+0.71
Transport Matters	1. Daniel Lowinger; 2. Ramy Abdelnour	3,067	0.66	+0.66
Victorian Socialists	1. Jorge Jorquera; 2. Andrew Charles	2,765	0.60	+0.60
Country	1. Benito Caruso; 2. Tony Leen	2,207	0.48	+0.29
Hudson for Northern Victoria	1. Hayley Webb; 2. Casey Eckel	573	0.12	+0.12
Independent	1. Diana Grima	199	0.04	+0.04
Independent	1. Kathy Majdlik	165	0.04	+0.04
Total formal votes		463,258	95.15	−0.63
Informal votes		23,606	4.85	+0.63
Turnout		486,864	89.25	−3.06

=== Western Victoria ===
Liberals/National coalition and Labor were defending 2 seats each. Vote 1 Local Jobs were defending one seat.

2018 Victorian state election: Western Victoria
Party	Candidate	Votes	%	±%
Quota		76,750		
Labor	1. Jaala Pulford (elected 1); 2. Gayle Tierney (elected 3); 3. Dylan Wight; 4. Lorraine O'Dal; 5. Bernard Gartland	175,836	38.18	+4.13
Liberal/National Coalition	1. Bev McArthur (elected 2); 2. Josh Morris; 3. Jo Armstrong; 4. Jennifer Lowe; 5. Andrew Black	137,825	29.92	−7.04
Greens	1. Lloyd Davies; 2. Judy Cameron; 3. Peter Mewett; 4. David Jefferson; 5. Judith Baldacchino	34,482	7.49	−1.70
Justice	1. Stuart Grimley (elected 4); 2. Michelle Tedesco	20,487	4.45	+4.45
Shooters, Fishers, Farmers	1. Geoff Collins; 2. Graeme Standen	20,412	4.43	+2.14
Animal Justice	1. Andy Meddick (elected 5); 2. Jen Gamble	12,736	2.77	+1.09
Liberal Democrats	1. Lachlan Christie; 2. Paul Robson	12,120	2.63	+0.04
Voluntary Euthanasia	1. Katrina Nugent; 2. John Berenyi	8,741	1.90	+1.90
Democratic Labour	1. Frances Beaumont; 2. Christian Schultink	7,246	1.57	+0.04
Country	1. Costa Di Biase; 2. John Buchholtz	6,310	1.37	+0.38
Aussie Battler	1. Anthony Prelorenzo; 2. Mark Mitchell	5,441	1.18	+1.18
Reason	1. Michael Bell; 2. Liam Hastie	4,230	0.92	−1.58
Victorian Socialists	1. Tim Gooden; 2. Nada Iskra	3,426	0.74	+0.74
Health Australia	1. Sonja Ljavroska; 2. Kayleen Thoren	3,346	0.73	+0.73
Sustainable Australia	1. Robert Pascoe; 2. Christopher Lynch	2,915	0.63	+0.63
Transport Matters	1. Nicholas Croker; 2. Francesco Raco	2,419	0.53	+0.53
Liberty Alliance	1. Kenneth Nicholls; 2. Daniel Macdonald	2,384	0.52	+0.52
Hudson for Northern Victoria	1. Sally Hudson; 2. Mark Wright	223	0.05	+0.05
Independent	1. Karl Pongracic	126	0.03	+0.03
Total formal votes		460,498	95.87	−1.16
Informal votes		19,819	4.13	+1.16
Turnout		480,317	91.44	−2.95

== See also ==
- 2018 Victorian state election
- Candidates of the 2018 Victorian state election
- Members of the Victorian Legislative Council, 2018–2022
