= Candidates of the 2018 Victorian state election =

This is a list of candidates for the 2018 Victorian state election. The election was held on 24 November 2018. Nominations of candidates opened on 31 October 2018. Nominations for party candidates closed on 8 November, and for independent candidates on 9 November.

A total of 887 candidates nominated for the election, down from 896 at the 2014 election. There are 507 candidates for the Legislative Assembly, the second-highest number on record, down from 545 in 2014. The 380 candidates for the Legislative Council is the highest number of upper house candidates in a Victorian election, up from 351 in 2014.

== Retiring Members ==
=== Labor ===
- Judith Graley MLA (Narre Warren South) – announced 19 August 2017
- Geoff Howard MLA (Buninyong) – announced 15 September 2017
- Sharon Knight MLA (Wendouree) – announced 31 July 2017
- Telmo Languiller MLA (Tarneit) – announced 26 August 2017
- Hong Lim MLA (Clarinda) – announced 5 September 2017
- Wade Noonan MLA (Williamstown) – announced 4 October 2017
- Jude Perera MLA (Cranbourne) – announced 15 September 2017
- Marsha Thomson MLA (Footscray) – announced 21 September 2017
- Khalil Eideh MLC (Western Metropolitan Region) – announced 21 September 2017
- Daniel Mulino MLC (Eastern Victoria Region) – retiring to run for federal House of Representatives

=== Liberal ===
- Louise Asher MLA (Brighton) – announced 11 August 2016
- Martin Dixon MLA (Nepean) – announced 10 August 2016
- Christine Fyffe MLA (Evelyn) – announced 21 October 2016
- Murray Thompson MLA (Sandringham) – announced 24 November 2016
- Richard Dalla-Riva MLC (Eastern Metropolitan Region) – announced 10 February 2017
- Simon Ramsay MLC (Western Victoria Region) – announced 24 July 2018

=== Independent ===
- Don Nardella MLA (Melton) – announced 28 February 2017

== Candidates for Legislative Assembly ==
Sitting members are shown in bold text. Successful candidates are highlighted in the relevant colour. Where there is possible confusion, an asterisk (*) is also used.

Electorate	Held by	Labor candidates	Coalition candidates	Greens candidates	Other candidates
Albert Park	Labor	**Martin Foley**	Andrew Bond (Lib)	Ogy Simic	Steven Armstrong (Sus); Jarryd Bartle (RP); Tamasin Ramsay (AJP); Joseph Toscano (Ind)
Altona	Labor	**Jill Hennessy**	Christian Martinu (Lib)	Emma-Jane Byrne	Maria Aylward (Ind); Tony Hooper (Ind)
Bass	Liberal	Jordan Crugnale	**Brian Paynter** (Lib)	David Arnault	Ron Bauer (Ind); Clare Le Serve (Ind); Kate Lempriere (Ind); Ross McPhee (DLP); Frank Ripa (SFFP)
Bayswater	Liberal	Jackson Taylor	**Heidi Victoria** (Lib)	Asher Cookson	Nathan Schram (AJP)
Bellarine	Labor	**Lisa Neville**	Brian McKiterick (Lib)	Rachel Semmens	Naomi Adams (AJP); Jackie Kriz (Soc)
Benambra	Liberal	Mark Tait	**Bill Tilley** (Lib)	John Bardsley	Jacqui Hawkins (Ind); Josh Knight (SFFP); Jenny O'Connor (Ind)
Bendigo East	Labor	**Jacinta Allan**	Gaelle Broad (Nat); Ian Ellis (Lib)	Nakita Thomson	Michael Belardinelli (Ind); Helen Leach (DLP)
Bendigo West	Labor	**Maree Edwards**	Kevin Finn (Lib)	Laurie Whelan	Marilyn Nuske (AJP)
Bentleigh	Labor	**Nick Staikos**	Asher Judah (Lib)	Sarah Dekiere	Naren Chellappah (AJP); Fi Fraser (DLP); Oscar Lobo (Ind); George Mavroyeni (Ind); Dave Stott (RP); Ellie Jean Sullivan (DHJP); Hans Verzijl (Sus)
Box Hill	Liberal	Paul Hamer	**Robert Clark** (Lib)	Sophia Sun	–
Brighton	Liberal	Declan Martin	James Newbury (Lib)	Katherine Copsey	John Casley (Ind); Alison Pridham (Sus); Cathy Taylor (AJP)
Broadmeadows	Labor	**Frank McGuire**	Jenny Dow (Lib)	Sheriden Tate	Jerome Small (Soc)
Brunswick	Labor	Cindy O'Connor	Adam Wojtonis (Lib)	Tim Read	Christopher Anderson (Ind); Noel Collins (LDP); Catherine Deveny (RP); George Georgiou (Ind); Christopher Miles (AJP); Kerry Sourasis (Ind)
Bulleen	Liberal	Fiona Mackenzie	**Matthew Guy** (Lib)	Chris Kearney	–
Bundoora	Labor	**Colin Brooks**	Jenny Mulholland (Lib)	Clement Stanyon	Jacob Andrewartha (Soc); Bryce Baker (RP); Rodney Whitfield (AJP)
Buninyong	Labor	Michaela Settle	Andrew Kilmartin (Lib)	Linda Zibell	Dianne Colbert (Ind); Brendan Eckel (Ind); Jane McKendrick (Soc); Wendy Morrison (AJP); Lindsay Watters (Ind)
Burwood	Liberal	Will Fowles	**Graham Watt** (Lib)	Graham Ross	Amanda Beattie (AJP); Andrew Williams (Sus)
Carrum	Labor	**Sonya Kilkenny**	Donna Bauer (Lib)	Braeden Thompson	Jennifer Bowden (DLP); Simone Philpott-Smart (DHJP); Michael Tellesson (Ind); Santosh Yadav (TMP)
Caulfield	Liberal	Sorina Grasso	**David Southwick** (Lib)	Dinesh Mathew	Aviya Bavati (Sus); Troy Evans (AJP)
Clarinda	Labor	Meng Heang Tak	Gandhi Bevinakoppa (Lib)	Josh Fergeus	Michael Gardner (Ind); Zhi Gang Zhuang (TMP)
Cranbourne	Labor	Pauline Richards	Ann-Marie Hermans (Lib)	Jake Tilton	Norman Fosberry (Ind); Susan Jakobi (Ind); Ravi Ragupathy (Ind); Tarlochan Singh (TMP); Edward Sok (DLP); Jason Soultanidis (DHJP)
Croydon	Liberal	Josh Cusack	**David Hodgett** (Lib)	Caleb O'Flynn	Vinita Costantino (AJP)
Dandenong	Labor	**Gabrielle Williams**	Virosh Perera (Lib)	Rhonda Garad	Afroz Ahmed (TMP)
Eildon	Liberal	Sally Brennan	**Cindy McLeish** (Lib)	Ken Deacon	Michelle Dunscombe (Ind)
Eltham	Labor	**Vicki Ward**	Nick McGowan (Lib)	Matthew Goodman	Peter O'Brien (DLP)
Essendon	Labor	**Danny Pearson**	Gino Potenza (Lib)	James Williams	Kate Baker (Ind); Dermot Connors (DLP); Richard Lawrence (Ind)
Euroa	National	Fionna Deppeler-Morton	**Steph Ryan** (Nat)	Keppel Cassidy	Don Firth (Ind)
Evelyn	Liberal	Gail Ritchie	Bridget Vallence (Lib)	Brodie Everist	–
Ferntree Gully	Liberal	Julie Buxton	**Nick Wakeling** (Lib)	Steve Raymond	–
Footscray	Labor	Katie Hall	Emete Joesika (Lib)	Angus McAlpine	Shan Sun (AJP)
Forest Hill	Liberal	Manoj Kumar	**Neil Angus** (Lib)	Naresh Bhalla	Claude Bai (Ind)
Frankston	Labor	**Paul Edbrooke**	Michael Lamb (Lib)	Colin Lane	Henry Kelsall (Ind); Michael Long (DLP); Lachlan O'Connell (DHJP); James Persson (AJP); Jyothi Rudra (TMP)
Geelong	Labor	**Christine Couzens**	Freya Fidge (Lib)	Lois Newman	Sarah Hathway (Soc); Jacki Jacka (AJP); Stephen Juhasz (Ind); Darryn Lyons (Ind); Gottfried Wolf (Ind)
Gembrook	Liberal	Michael Galea	**Brad Battin** (Lib)	Amy Gregorovich	–
Gippsland East	National	Mark Reeves	**Tim Bull** (Nat)	Deb Foskey	Sonia Buckley (LDP); Benjamin Garrett (Ind); George Neophytou (Ind); Matt Stephenson (Ind)
Gippsland South	National	Denise Ryan	**Danny O'Brien** (Nat)	Ian Onley	–
Hastings	Liberal	Simon Meyer	**Neale Burgess** (Lib)	Nathan Lesslie	Georgia Knight (AJP)
Hawthorn	Liberal	John Kennedy	**John Pesutto** (Lib)	Nicholas Bieber	Richard Grummet (Ind); Sophie Paterson (Sus); Catherine Wright (AJP)
Ivanhoe	Labor	**Anthony Carbines**	Monica Clark (Lib)	Andrew Conley	Philip Jenkins (DLP); Craig Langdon (Ind)
Kew	Liberal	Marg D'Arcy	**Tim Smith** (Lib)	Alex Marks	Bronwyn Gardiner (AJP); Paul Scaturchio (Sus)
Keysborough	Labor	**Martin Pakula**	Darrel Taylor (Lib)	Ken McAlpine	Usman Afzal (TMP); Helen Jeges (AJP); Hung Vo (Ind)
Kororoit	Labor	**Marlene Kairouz**	Golam Haque (Lib)	Rohan Waring	Katherine Divita (AJP)
Lara	Labor	**John Eren**	Melissa Di Pasquale (Lib)	Amber Forbes	Bronwen Baker (AJP); Dean Cardigan (Soc)
Lowan	National	Maurice Billi	**Emma Kealy** (Nat)	Richard Lane	Trevor Grenfell (Soc); Barry Shea (Ind)
Macedon	Labor	**Mary-Anne Thomas**	Amanda Millar (Lib)	Ralf Thesing	Rob Bakes (Ind); Tony O'Brien (DLP); Ruth Parramore (AJP)
Malvern	Liberal	Oliver Squires	**Michael O'Brien** (Lib)	Polly Morgan	Candace Feild (AJP); Michaela Moran (Sus)
Melbourne	Greens	Jennifer Kanis	Darin Schade (Lib)	**Ellen Sandell**	Leo Close (RP); Kim Fuhrmann (ABP); Peter Hanlon (Ind); Lawrence Pope (AJP); Benjamin Rookes (LDP)
Melton	Labor	Steve McGhie	Ryan Farrow (Lib)	Harkirat Singh	Victor Bennett (DLP); Jarrod Bingham (Ind); Ian Birchall (Ind); Ron Guy (Soc); Daryl Lang (Ind); Tania Milton (AJP); Sophie Ramsey (Ind); Grant Stirling (Ind); Bob Turner (Ind)
Mildura	National	Tony Alessi	**Peter Crisp** (Nat)	Cathryn Milne	Ali Cupper* (Ind); Steve Timmis (Ind)
Mill Park	Labor	**Lily D'Ambrosio**	Lakhwinder Dillon (Lib)	Alexander Edwards	Nicholas Reich (Soc); Marcia Simons (AJP)
Monbulk	Labor	**James Merlino**	John Schurink (Lib)	Liz Hicks	Jordan Crook (Ind); Joshua Norman (DLP)
Mordialloc	Labor	**Tim Richardson**	Geoff Gledhill (Lib)	Hamish Taylor	Bronwyn Currie (AJP); Robyn Nolan (Ind); Peter Phillips (DLP); Phil Reid (Ind); Peter Sullivan (DHJP); Amit Verma (TMP); Stephen Watson (Ind)
Mornington	Liberal	Ryan White	**David Morris** (Lib)	David Sinclair	Tyson Jack (AJP)
Morwell	National	Mark Richards	Sheridan Bond (Nat); Dale Harriman (Lib)	Daniel Caffrey	Ray Burgess (Ind); Reece Diggins (ABP); Nathan Keen (DLP); Tracie Lund (Ind); Ricky Muir (SFFP); **Russell Northe*** (Ind); Christine Sindt (Ind)
Mount Waverley	Liberal	Matt Fregon	**Michael Gidley** (Lib)	Justin McCarthy	–
Mulgrave	Labor	**Daniel Andrews**	Maree Davenport (Lib)	Ovi Rajasinghe	Des Kelly (DLP); Nadeem Malik (TMP)
Murray Plains	National	Peter Williams	**Peter Walsh** (Nat)	Ian Christoe	Daniel Straub (SFFP)
Narracan	Liberal	Christine Maxfield	**Gary Blackwood** (Lib)	William Hornstra	Carlo Ierfone (Ind); Guss Lambden (Ind)
Narre Warren North	Labor	**Luke Donnellan**	Vikki Fitzgerald (Lib)	Stefanie Bauer	Sami Greiss (DLP); Zeeshan Mahmood (TMP)
Narre Warren South	Labor	Gary Maas	Susan Serey (Lib)	Michael Butler	Gagandeep Singh (TMP)
Nepean	Liberal	Chris Brayne	Russell Joseph (Lib)	Paul Saunders	Rodger Gully (Ind); Simon Mulvany (Ind)
Niddrie	Labor	**Ben Carroll**	Ben Reeson (Lib)	Jean-Luke Desmarais	Rebbecca Primmer (AJP)
Northcote	Greens	Kat Theophanous	John MacIsaac (Lib)	**Lidia Thorpe**	David Bramante (AJP); Bryony Edwards (Ind); Samuel Fink (LDP); Franca Smarrelli (RP)
Oakleigh	Labor	**Steve Dimopoulos**	Andrew Edmonds (Lib)	Peter Morgan	Brandon Hoult (Sus); Parashos Kioupelis (Ind); Suzanne Parker (AJP)
Ovens Valley	National	Kate Doyle	**Tim McCurdy** (Nat)	Vicki Berry	Tammy Atkins (Ind); Ray Dyer (Ind); Julian Fidge (ACP)
Pascoe Vale	Labor	**Lizzie Blandthorn**	Genevieve Hamilton (Lib)	Phil Jackson	Gerry Beaton (Soc); John Kavanagh (Ind); Graeme Linsell (AJP); Francesco Timpano (Ind); Oscar Yildiz (Ind)
Polwarth	Liberal	Douglas Johnston	**Richard Riordan** (Lib)	Courtney Gardner	Brendan Murphy (Soc); Damien Pitts (AJP)
Prahran	Greens	Neil Pharaoh	Katie Allen (Lib)	**Sam Hibbins**	Dennis Bilic (Sus); Leon Kofmansky (DLP); Jennifer Long (AJP); Alan Menadue (Ind); Wendy Patterson (ABP); Tom Tomlin (Ind)
Preston	Labor	**Robin Scott**	Guido Lilio (Lib)	Susanne Newton	Margee Glover (RP); Gaetano Greco (Ind); Stephanie Price (Soc); Nadine Richings (AJP)
Richmond	Labor	**Richard Wynne**	–	Kathleen Maltzahn	Craig Kealy (AJP); Herschel Landes (Ind); Emma Manning (Ind); Judy Ryan (RP); Kevin Tran (Ind); Adrian Whitehead (Ind)
Ringwood	Liberal	Dustin Halse	**Dee Ryall** (Lib)	Robert Humphreys	–
Ripon	Liberal	Sarah De Santis	**Louise Staley** (Lib)	Serge Simic	Peter Fava (SFFP); Sandra Gibbs (DHJP); Anna Hills (AJP); Bronwyn Jennings (Soc); Maria Mayer (Ind); Peter Mulcahy (DLP); Jeff Truscott (Ind)
Rowville	Liberal	Muhammad Shahbaz	**Kim Wells** (Lib)	Natasha Sharma	Joe Cossari (Ind)
Sandringham	Liberal	Anita Horvath	Brad Rowswell (Lib)	Dominic Phillips (disendorsed)	Liz Freeman (DLP); Creighton King (Sus); Clarke Martin (Ind); Snezana Redford (AJP)
Shepparton	Independent	Bill Heath	Cheryl Hammer (Lib); Peter Schwarz (Nat)	Nickee Freeman	**Suzanna Sheed*** (Ind); Murray Willaton (SFFP)
South Barwon	Liberal	Darren Cheeseman	**Andrew Katos** (Lib)	Marian Smedley	David Ball (Soc); Stephen Campbell (DLP); Damien Cole (Ind); Peter Oseckas (AJP); Robert Ripa (SFFP)
South-West Coast	Liberal	Kylie Gaston	**Roma Britnell** (Lib)	Thomas Campbell	Jim Doukas (ACP); Michael McCluskey (Ind); Michael Neoh (Ind); James Purcell (Ind); Joseph Purtill (DLP); Terry Riggs (Soc)
St Albans	Labor	**Natalie Suleyman**	Trung Luu (Lib)	Cylene Magri	Jenny Isa (Ind)
Sunbury	Labor	**Josh Bull**	Cassandra Marr (Lib)	Ryan Keable	–
Sydenham	Labor	**Natalie Hutchins**	Maria Kerr (Lib)	Clinton Hare	Ramanjit Singh (Ind)
Tarneit	Labor	Sarah Connolly	Glenn Goodfellow (Lib)	Beck Sheffield-Brotherton	Aaron An (Ind); Harkamal Batth (Ind); Arnav Sati (Ind); Zulfi Syed (Ind)
Thomastown	Labor	**Bronwyn Halfpenny**	Gurdawar Singh (Lib)	Cynthia Smith	Alahna Desiato (Ind); Kath Larkin (Soc); Tess Nagorka-Tsindos (AJP); Ibrahim Saba (Ind); Nikola Stavreski (Ind); David Thirkettle-Watts (RP)
Warrandyte	Liberal	Elizabeth McGrath	**Ryan Smith** (Lib)	Ben Ramcharan	Lachlan McGill (AJP)
Wendouree	Labor	Juliana Addison	Amy Johnson (Lib)	Alice Barnes	Bryn Hills (AJP); Alison Smith (Ind); Jeremy Smith (Soc)
Werribee	Labor	**Tim Pallas**	Gayle Murphy (Lib)	Jay Dessi	Kathryn Breakwell (DLP); Rachel Carling-Jenkins (Ind); Joe Garra (Ind); Thanh Nga Ly (Ind); Pratibha Sharma (Ind)
Williamstown	Labor	Melissa Horne	Pallavee Joshi (Lib)	Sam Long	Lisa Bentley (Ind); Peter Hemphill (Ind); Virginia Saint-James (AJP)
Yan Yean	Labor	**Danielle Green**	Meralyn Klein (Lib) (disendorsed)	Hugh McKinnon	Yassin Albarri (Ind); Arthur Bablis (DLP); Munish Bansal (Ind); Siobhann Brown (ALA); David Snelling (SFFP)
Yuroke	Labor	**Ros Spence**	Jim Overend (Lib)	Louise Sampson	Emma Dook (Soc); Golda Zogheib (Ind)

== Candidates for Legislative Council ==
Sitting members are shown in bold text. Tickets that elected at least one MLC are highlighted in the relevant colour. Successful candidates are identified by an asterisk (*).

=== Eastern Metropolitan ===
The Labor Party were defending one seat. The Liberal Party were defending three seats. The Greens were defending one seat.

Labor candidates	Liberal candidates	Greens candidates	Reason candidates	SFFP candidates	Justice candidates
1. **Shaun Leane***; 2. Sonja Terpstra*; 3. Nildhara Gadani; 4. Abhimanyu Kumar; 5. Barry Terzic	1. **Mary Wooldridge***; 2. **Bruce Atkinson***; 3. Emanuele Cicchiello; 4. Grace Roy; 5. Shilpa Hegde	1. **Samantha Dunn**; 2. Helen Harris; 3. Liezl Shnookal; 4. Monique Edwards; 5. Daniela Tymms	1. Douglas Leitch; 2. Glenn Lynch	1. Monique Ruyter; 2. Grant Poulton	1. Linda De Rango; 2. Kathryn Lavell
AJP candidates	Sustainable candidates	Health Australia candidates	Socialists candidates	Hudson candidates	Transport Matters candidates
1. Rosemary Lavin; 2. Theresa Weymouth	1. Lynnette Saloumi; 2. Perrin Wilkins	1. Andrew Hicks; 2. Gabrielle Brodie	1. Norrian Rundle; 2. Liam Ward	1. Shelley van Luenen; 2. Deidre Bailey	1. Rod Barton*; 2. Toni Peters
ALA candidates	Country candidates	DLP candidates	VEP candidates	LDP candidates	Battler candidates
1. Indhira Bivieca Aquino; 2. Royston Wilding	1. Mil Erikozu; 2. Russel Proud	1. Jeremy Orchard; 2. Benjamin Cronshaw	1. Dermot Ryan; 2. Tara Nipe	1. Brenton Ford; 2. Marcos Fernandes	1. Bryce Larson; 2. Clyde Sterry

=== Eastern Victoria ===
The Labor Party were defending two seats. The Liberal/National Coalition were defending two seats. The Shooters, Fishers and Farmers Party were defending one seat.

Labor candidates	Coalition candidates	Greens candidates	SFFP candidates	Reason candidates	Justice candidates
1. Jane Garrett*; 2. **Harriet Shing***; 3. Patrick Kelly; 4. Jane Clarke; 5. Onno van den Eynde	1. **Edward O'Donohue*** (Lib); 2. **Melina Bath*** (Nat); 3. Meg Edwards (Lib); 4. Karen Chipperfield (Lib); 5. Darren Howe (Nat)	1. Tom Cummings; 2. Lachlan Mackenzie; 3. Neale Adams; 4. David Gentle; 5. Donald Stokes	1. **Jeff Bourman***; 2. Kerrie-Anne Muir	1. Carmel Close; 2. Gregory Bell	1. Rhonda Crooks; 2. Philip Seabrook
Country candidates	Health Australia candidates	Sustainable candidates	Transport Matters candidates	Socialists candidates	Hudson candidates
1. Rob Danieli; 2. Tony Geitenbeek	1. Geoff Pain; 2. Katherine Holmes	1. Reade Smith; 2. Donna Hannaford	1. Trevor Salmon; 2. Joshua Roperto	1. Lainie Cruse; 2. Russell Forden	1. Megan Whittaker; 2. Kristy Hudson
AJP candidates	VEP candidates	LDP candidates	DLP candidates	ALA candidates	Battler candidates
1. Leah Folloni; 2. Jennifer McAdam	1. Michelle Hain; 2. Martin Barnes	1. Ben Buckley; 2. Rob McCathie	1. Padraig O'Hea; 2. Larry Norman	1. Mark Brown; 2. Daniel Jones	1. Vern Hughes; 2. Paula Mattson
Ungrouped candidates					
Michael Fozard (Ind)

=== Northern Metropolitan ===
The Labor Party were defending two seats. The Liberal Party were defending one seat. The Greens were defending one seat. The Sex Party, rebranded as the Reason Party, were defending one seat.

Labor candidates	Liberal candidates	Greens candidates	Reason candidates	SFFP candidates	Justice candidates
1. **Jenny Mikakos***; 2. **Nazih Elasmar***; 3. Burhan Yigit; 4. Ash Verma; 5. Karen Douglas	1. **Craig Ondarchie***; 2. Evan Mulholland; 3. Neelam Rai; 4. Kate Drake; 5. Mark Polistena	1. **Samantha Ratnam***; 2. Christina Zigouras; 3. Edward Crossland; 4. Josef Rafalowicz; 5. Campbell Gome	1. **Fiona Patten***; 2. Helena Melton; 3. Ange Hopkins; 4. Rachel Payne; 5. Dominique Musico	1. Ethan Constantinou; 2. Chris Tzelepis	1. Carmela Dagiandis; 2. Prudence Mercieca
AJP candidates	Socialists candidates	Health Australia candidates	Sustainable candidates	Hudson candidates	DLP candidates
1. Bruce Poon; 2. Miranda Smith; 3. Chris Delforce	1. Stephen Jolly; 2. Sue Bolton; 3. Colleen Bolger	1. Pippa Campbell; 2. Emily Oldmeadow	1. Mark McDonald; 2. William Clow	1. Madison Wright; 2. Marylynn Meneghini	1. John McBride; 2. Jackie Gwynne
VEP candidates	LDP candidates	Country candidates	Local Jobs candidates	Transport Matters candidates	Battler candidates
1. Sandra McCarthy; 2. Stefan Nott	1. Louise Hitchcock; 2. Richard Wright	1. Cameron Stoddart; 2. Domenic Greco	1. Nathan Purcell; 2. Aaron Purcell	1. Moti Ram Visa; 2. Afshan Mian	1. Walter Mikac; 2. David Graham
ALA candidates					
1. Russell Gomez; 2. John Reisner

=== Northern Victoria ===
The Labor Party were defending two seats. The Liberal/National Coalition were defending two seats. The Shooters, Fishers and Farmers Party were defending one seat.

Labor candidates	Coalition candidates	Greens candidates	SFFP candidates	Reason candidates	Justice candidates
1. **Mark Gepp***; 2. **Jaclyn Symes***; 3. Sukhraj Singh; 4. Jan Morgiewicz; 5. Glenn Matthews	1. **Wendy Lovell*** (Lib); 2. **Luke O'Sullivan** (Nat); 3. Brad Hearn (Lib); 4. Emma Williamson (Nat); 5. Robyne Head (Lib)	1. Nicole Rowan; 2. Damien Stevens-Todd; 3. Elizabeth Matchett; 4. Julie Rivendell; 5. Matthew Thomas	1. **Daniel Young**; 2. Ben Podger	1. Martin Leahy; 2. Callum Chapman	1. Tania Maxwell*; 2. Jodi Ayres
Country candidates	Sustainable candidates	Hudson candidates	Socialists candidates	AJP candidates	Health Australia candidates
1. Phil Larkin; 2. David Couston	1. Madeleine Wearne; 2. Ian Chivers	1. Josh Hudson; 2. Shane O'Sullivan	1. Moira Macdonald; 2. Michael McKenna	1. Glynn Jarrett; 2. Robyn Masih	1. Isaac Golden; 2. Anne Sash
Transport Matters candidates	ALA candidates	VEP candidates	LDP candidates	Battler candidates	DLP candidates
1. Scott Cowie; 2. Eleanore Fitz	1. Ewan McDonald; 2. James Wylie	1. Miranda Jones; 2. Craig Hill	1. Tim Quilty*; 2. Iain King	1. Dennis Lacey; 2. Erin Bruhn	1. Chris McCormack; 2. Jarred Vehlen

=== South Eastern Metropolitan ===
The Labor Party was defending two seats. The Liberal Party was defending two seats. The Greens were defending one seat.

Labor candidates	Liberal candidates	Greens candidates	Reason candidates	SFFP candidates	Justice candidates
1. **Gavin Jennings***; 2. **Adem Somyurek***; 3. Tien Kieu*; 4. Nessie Sayar; 5. Ian Spencer	1. **Gordon Rich-Phillips***; 2. **Inga Peulich**; 3. George Hua; 4. Kuldeep Kaur; 5. Robert Hicks	1. **Nina Springle**; 2. Matthew Kirwan; 3. Jacqueline Mitchell; 4. Jake Vos; 5. Tasma Minifie	1. Laura Chipp; 2. Brett Kagan	1. Chris Banhidy; 2. Vincent Leone	1. Peter Davy; 2. Kerri Guy
Country candidates	Hudson candidates	Sustainable candidates	Transport Matters candidates	Socialists candidates	DLP candidates
1. Andrew Hepner; 2. Marilyn Danieli	1. Jannette Sinclair; 2. Holly Madill	1. Anthony Cresswell; 2. Daryl Budgeon	1. Ali Khan; 2. Chetan Sharma; 3. Roona Fazal; 4. Inderpal Singh; 5. Deepakbir Kaur	1. Aran Mylvaganam; 2. Ben Reid	1. Peter Stevens; 2. Michael Palma
Health Australia candidates	AJP candidates	VEP candidates	ALA candidates	LDP candidates	Battler candidates
1. Tamsin King; 2. Carly Meaden	1. Elizabeth Johnston; 2. Derrin Craig	1. Kassandra Hall; 2. Mardi Hill	1. David Maddison; 2. Ralf Schumann	1. David Limbrick*; 2. Matt Ford	1. David Armstrong; 2. Michael Chamberlain
Group D candidates	Ungrouped candidates				
1. Tarang Chawla; 2. Nicole Lee	Stewart Hine (Ind); Peter Mack (Ind); Bobby Singh (Ind)				

=== Southern Metropolitan ===
The Labor Party was defending one seat. The Liberal Party was defending three seats. The Greens was defending one seat.

Labor candidates	Liberal candidates	Greens candidates	Reason candidates	SFFP candidates	Justice candidates
1. **Philip Dalidakis***; 2. Nina Taylor*; 3. Judith Armstrong; 4. Graeme Kendall; 5. Danny Bellote	1. **David Davis***; 2. **Georgie Crozier***; 3. **Margaret Fitzherbert**; 4. Gavan MacRides; 5. Miaosheng Yang	1. **Sue Pennicuik**; 2. Earl James; 3. Rose Read; 4. Duncan Forster; 5. James Bennett	1. Jill Mellon-Robertson; 2. Edmund Munday	1. Nicole Bourman; 2. Ryan Lindfors-Beswick	1. Nikki Nicholls; 2. Julie Doidge
AJP candidates	DLP candidates	Health Australia candidates	Sustainable candidates	Socialists candidates	Hudson candidates
1. Ben Schultz; 2. Fiona McRostie	1. Joel van der Horst; 2. Lucia De Summa	1. Ben Moore; 2. Cindy Cerecer	1. Clifford Hayes*; 2. Cathryn Houghton	1. Catheryn Lewis; 2. Ivan Mitchell	1. Matthew Perriam; 2. Grace Perriam
Transport Matters candidates	ALA candidates	VEP candidates	Country candidates	LDP candidates	Battler candidates
1. Kim Guest; 2. Saeed Muhammad	1. Avi Yemini; 2. Kaylah Jones	1. Jane Morris; 2. Imelda Ryan	1. Nicola Clow; 2. Michele Armstrong	1. Robert Kennedy; 2. Kirsty O'Sullivan	1. Mark Hillard; 2. Stacey Wain

=== Western Metropolitan ===
The Labor Party was defending two seats. The Liberal Party was defending one seat. The Greens was defending one seat. The Democratic Labour Party was defending one seat, although MLC Rachel Carling-Jenkins, initially defecting to the Australian Conservatives and then sitting as an independent, unsuccessfully contested the lower house seat of Werribee.

Labor candidates	Liberal candidates	Greens candidates	Reason candidates	SFFP candidates	Justice candidates
1. **Cesar Melhem***; 2. Ingrid Stitt*; 3. Kaushaliya Vaghela*; 4. Kirsten Psaila; 5. Louise Persse	1. **Bernie Finn***; 2. Dinesh Gourisetty; 3. Moira Deeming; 4. David Wood; 5. Nathan Di Noia	1. **Huong Truong**; 2. Emely Cash; 3. Bernadette Thomas; 4. Elena Pereyra; 5. Annie Chessells-Beeby	1. Chris Botha; 2. Jamie Twidale	1. Wayne Rigg; 2. Geoff Ashby	1. Catherine Cumming*; 2. Daniel Cumming
DLP candidates	Health Australia candidates	Hudson candidates	Sustainable candidates	Transport Matters candidates	Socialists candidates
1. Walter Villagonzalo; 2. Mark Royal	1. Briony Jenkinson; 2. Deanne Glenn	1. Hayley Webb; 2. Casey Eckel	1. Allan Doensen; 2. Richard Belcher	1. Daniel Lowinger; 2. Ramy Abdelnour	1. Jorge Jorquera; 2. Andrew Charles
AJP candidates	ALA candidates	VEP candidates	LDP candidates	Country candidates	Battler candidates
1. Terri Beech; 2. Karina Leung	1. Francine Cohen; 2. Terri Franklin	1. Joan Beckwith; 2. Nia Sims	1. Adam Karlovsky; 2. Mark Thompson; 3. Christopher Reeves	1. Benito Caruso; 2. Tony Leen	1. Stuart O'Neill; 2. Ian Kearns
Ungrouped candidates
Kathy Majdlik (Ind); Diana Grima (Ind)

=== Western Victoria ===
The Labor Party were defending two seats. The Liberal/National Coalition were defending two seats. Vote 1 Local Jobs were defending one seat, although founder James Purcell unsuccessfully contested the lower house South-West Coast district.

Labor candidates	Coalition candidates	Greens candidates	SFFP candidates	Reason candidates	Justice candidates
1. **Jaala Pulford***; 2. **Gayle Tierney***; 3. Dylan Wight; 4. Lorraine O'Dal; 5. Bernard Gartland	1. Bev McArthur* (Lib); 2. **Josh Morris** (Lib); 3. Jo Armstrong (Nat); 4. Jennifer Lowe (Lib); 5. Andrew Black (Nat)	1. Lloyd Davies; 2. Judy Cameron; 3. Peter Mewett; 4. David Jefferson; 5. Judith Baldacchino	1. Geoff Collins; 2. Graeme Standen	1. Michael Bell; 2. Liam Hastie	1. Stuart Grimley*; 2. Michelle Tedesco
Country candidates	DLP candidates	Hudson candidates	Sustainable candidates	Socialists candidates	Transport Matters candidates
1. Costa Di Biase; 2. John Buchholtz	1. Frances Beaumont; 2. Christian Schultink	1. Sally Hudson; 2. Mark Wright	1. Robert Pascoe; 2. Christopher Lynch	1. Tim Gooden; 2. Nada Iskra	1. Nicholas Croker; 2. Francesco Raco
AJP candidates	VEP candidates	LDP candidates	ALA candidates	Health Australia candidates	Battler candidates
1. Andy Meddick*; 2. Jen Gamble	1. Katrina Nugent; 2. John Berenyi	1. Lachlan Christie; 2. Paul Robson	1. Kenneth Nicholls; 2. Daniel Macdonald	1. Sonja Ljavroska; 2. Kayleen Thoren	1. Anthony Prelorenzo; 2. Mark Mitchell
Ungrouped candidates
Karl Pongracic (Ind)
