= Alannah & Madeline Foundation =

Australian charitable organisation

- Founded: 30 April 1997
- Type: Charity
- Key people: Greg Sutherland, Chairman
- Website: amf.org.au

The Alannah & Madeline Foundation is an Australian charity which was launched on 30 April 1997. It is located in Victoria, but operates as a national charity. The organisation works to prevent violence against children.

== History and organisation ==
=== Formation ===
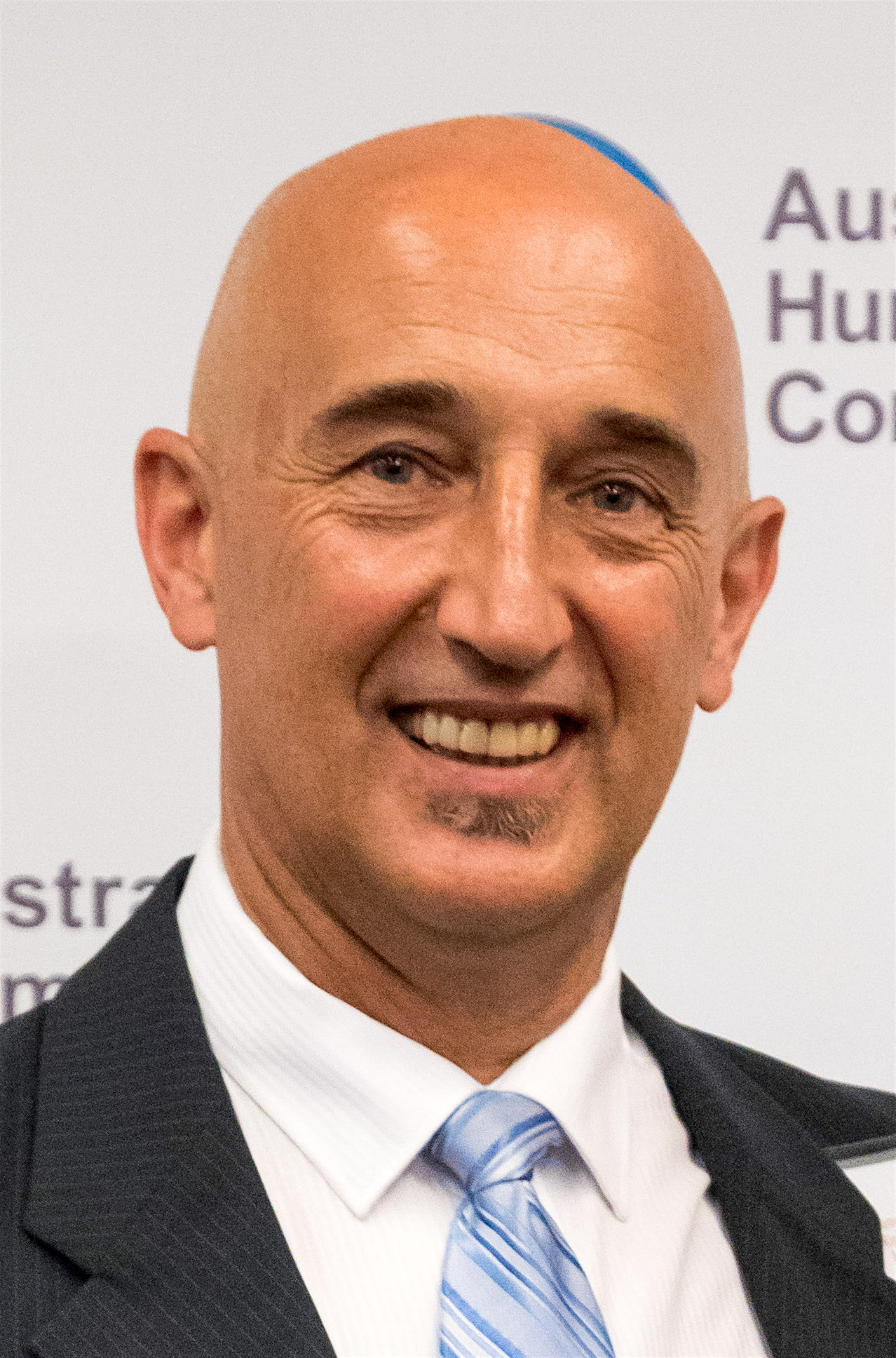
Walter Mikac, the organisation's founder

The Alannah & Madeline Foundation was set up in memory of Alannah and Madeline Mikac, aged six and three, who were killed with their mother and 32 others at Port Arthur, Tasmania, on 28 April 1996.

Alannah and Madeline's father, Walter Mikac, Phil West and a small group of volunteers including Gaye and John Fidler who survived Port Arthur, established the foundation in the girls' memory, a national charity with the belief that all children should have a safe and happy childhood without being subjected to any form of violence.

On 30 April 1997, the Prime Minister of Australia, John Howard, officially administered the national launch of the Alannah & Madeline Foundation.

== See also ==
- The Hance Family Foundation, a similar children's organization in the United States of America founded by Jackie and Warren Hance, whose three daughters were murdered by their aunt in the 2009 Taconic State Parkway crash.
