= 2018 Victorian state election =

Election for the 59th Parliament of Victoria

- 24 November 2018

All 88 seats in the Victorian Legislative Assembly All 40 seats in the Victorian Legislative Council 45 seats needed for a majority
- Opinion polls
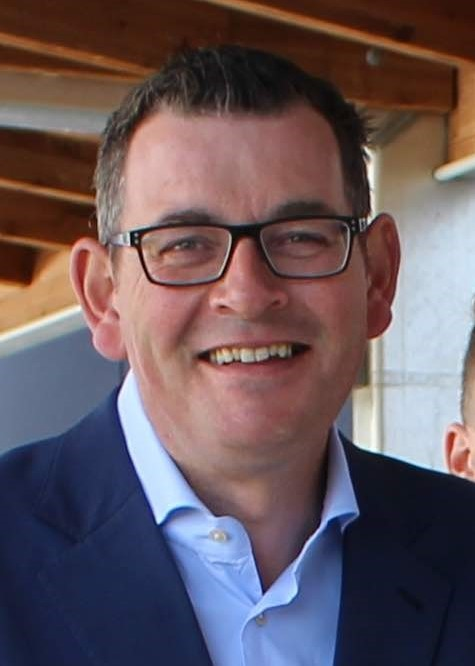

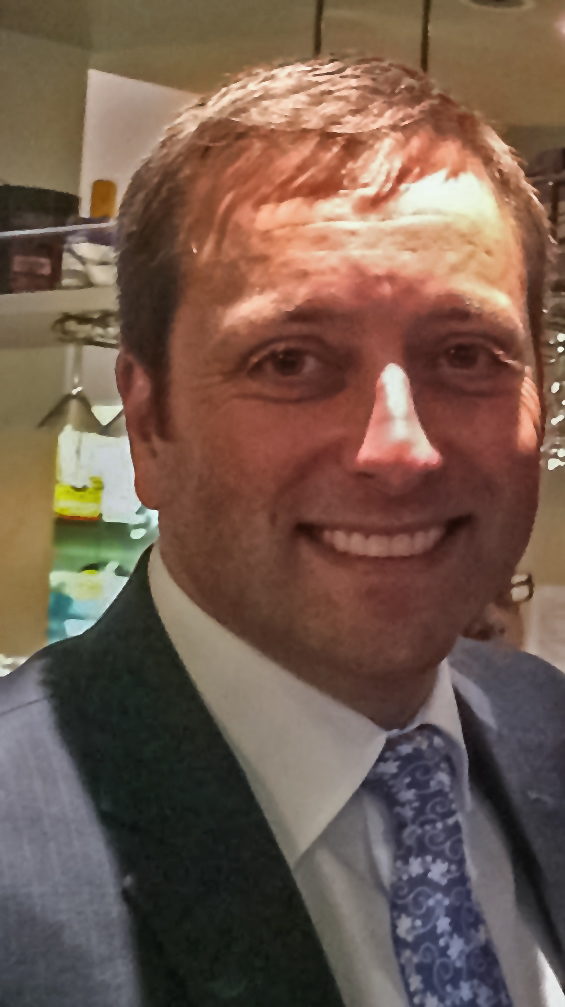

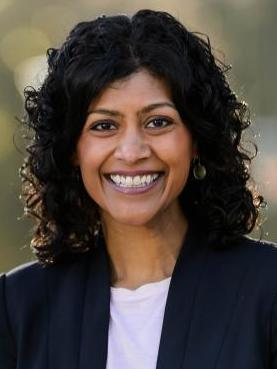
	First party	Second party	Third party
Leader	Daniel Andrews	Matthew Guy	Samantha Ratnam
Party	Labor	Liberal–National coalition	Greens
Leader since	3 December 2010	4 December 2014	12 October 2017
Leader's seat	Mulgrave	Bulleen	MLC for Northern; Metropolitan
Last election	47 seats	38 seats	2 seats
Seats before	45	37	3
Seats won	55	27	3
Seat change	▲10	▼10	Steady
Primary vote	1,506,460	1,236,912	376,470
Percentage	42.86%	35.20%	10.71%
Swing	▲4.77	▼6.80	▼0.77
TPP	57.30%	42.70%
TPP swing	▲5.31	▼5.31
- Results in each electorate.
Premier before election
Daniel Andrews
Labor
Premier after election
Daniel Andrews
Labor

The 2018 Victorian state election was held on Saturday, 24 November 2018 to elect the 59th Parliament of Victoria. All 88 seats in the Legislative Assembly (lower house) and all 40 seats in the Legislative Council (upper house) were up for election. The first-term incumbent Labor government, led by Premier Daniel Andrews, won a second four-year term, defeating the Liberal/National Coalition opposition, led by Opposition Leader Matthew Guy in a landslide victory. The Greens, a minor party led by Samantha Ratnam also contested the election.

Labor won 55 seats in the 88-seat Legislative Assembly, an increase of eight seats from the previous election in 2014, and a majority of 22 seats. This was the fifth time that a Labor government was re-elected in Victoria, and it tied Victorian Labor's second-best showing at the state level. The Coalition suffered an 11-seat swing against it, and won 27 seats. The Greens won three seats, a net increase of one seat since the last election though equal to the share of seats they held when the election was called. The remaining three seats on the crossbench were won by independents. In the Legislative Council, Labor won 18 seats, three short of a majority. The Coalition won 11 seats, and the remaining 11 seats were won by a range of minor parties from across the political spectrum.

Several days after Labor's victory, the Second Andrews Ministry was sworn in by the Governor and was notable for featuring an equal number of men and women. The following week the Liberal Party elected Michael O'Brien leader of the party, who became Opposition Leader in the new parliament, after Guy had announced earlier he would stand down from the position.

For the election, Victoria had compulsory voting and used majoritarian preferential voting in single-member seats for the Legislative Assembly, and Single transferable vote (STV) in multi-member seats for the proportionally represented Legislative Council. The Legislative Council had 40 members serving four-year terms, elected from eight electoral regions each with five members. The Victorian Legislative Council uses Group Voting Tickets. With each region electing five members, the quota in each region for election, after distribution of preferences, was 16.7% (one-sixth) of the valid votes cast in that district. The election was conducted by the Victorian Electoral Commission (VEC), an independent body answerable to parliament.

== Key dates ==
Pursuant to the Electoral Act 2002, Victoria has had fixed terms, with all elections since the 2006 election held every four years on the last Saturday of November. The incumbent government entered into caretaker mode at 6:00 pm on Tuesday, 30 October 2018, when writs were officially issued.

Key dates for the election are:

- 30 October: Writs issued by the Governor of Victoria
- 31 October: Opening of nominations for all candidates
- 6 November: Close of electoral roll
- 8 November: Close of nominations for party candidates
- 9 November: Close of nominations for independent candidates
- 12 November: Early voting begins
- 24 November: Election day (polls open 8am to 6pm)
- 30 November: Last day for receipt of postal votes
- 15 December: Last day for return of writs.

== Previous parliament ==
=== Legislative Assembly ===
Following the 2014 election, Labor formed majority government with 47 seats. The Coalition held 38 seats, with the Liberal Party holding 30 and the National Party holding 8. On the crossbench, the Greens held 2 seats and Independent Suzanna Sheed held the seat of Shepparton.

=== Legislative Council ===
Following the 2014 election, Labor held 14 seats; the Coalition held 16 seats (14 Liberal, 2 National); the Greens held 5 seats; the Shooters, Fishers and Farmers Party held 2 seats; and the Sex Party (now the Reason Party), Democratic Labour Party, and Vote 1 Local Jobs party held 1 seat each.

=== By-elections ===
Former Nationals leader Peter Ryan announced his resignation from parliament on 2 February 2015, triggering a by-election in the seat of Gippsland South for 14 March. The election was won by Danny O'Brien of the National Party.

Denis Napthine and Terry Mulder resigned from parliament on 3 September 2015. Their seats were retained by the Liberal Party in by-elections held in South-West Coast and Polwarth on 31 October.

Minister for Women and Minister for the Prevention of Family Violence Fiona Richardson died on 23 August 2017. A by-election was held in the seat of Northcote on 18 November, in which the Victorian Greens won the seat from the Labor Party.

=== Changes in parliament ===
Don Nardella, the former Deputy Speaker of the Assembly and member for the seat of Melton, resigned from the Labor Party on 7 March 2017 to sit as an independent. Nardella's resignation was demanded by Premier Andrews after Nardella refused to pay back approximately $100,000 of taxpayer funded entitlements in the midst an expenses scandal. The resignation reduced the number of Labor members in the Assembly from 47 to 46, still above the 45 seats needed for majority government to be formed. Nardella had previously announced his intention to quit politics at the 2018 election and following his resignation from the Labor Party stated he intended to serve out his full term as the member for Melton.

Russell Northe, the member for Morwell resigned from the National Party on 28 August 2017, due to mental health and financial issues, continuing in his position as an independent.

Greg Barber resigned as Leader of the Greens and from his Northern Metropolitan Region seat on 28 September 2017, and was replaced in both by Moreland councillor Samantha Ratnam.

Colleen Hartland, a Greens member of the Western Metropolitan Region, resigned on 8 February 2018, and was replaced by Huong Truong.

== State of electorates ==
The following Mackerras pendulum lists seats in the Legislative Assembly according to the percentage point margin on a two candidate preferred basis based on the 2014 election results. The Australian Electoral Commission considers a seat "safe" if it requires a swing of over 10% to change, "fairly safe" seats require a swing of between 6 and 10%, while "marginal" seats require a swing of less than 6%.

Labor seats - 2014
Seat	Member	Party	Margin
Marginal
Frankston	Paul Edbrooke	ALP	0.5%
Carrum	Sonya Kilkenny	ALP	0.7%
Bentleigh	Nick Staikos	ALP	0.8%
Richmond	Richard Wynne	ALP	1.9% v GRN
Mordialloc	Tim Richardson	ALP	2.1%
Brunswick	Jane Garrett	ALP	2.2% v GRN
Cranbourne	Jude Perera	ALP	2.3%
Eltham	Vicki Ward	ALP	2.7%
Albert Park	Martin Foley	ALP	3.0%
Ivanhoe	Anthony Carbines	ALP	3.4%
Yan Yean	Danielle Green	ALP	3.7%
Macedon	Mary-Anne Thomas	ALP	3.8%
Sunbury	Josh Bull	ALP	4.3%
Mulgrave	Daniel Andrews	ALP	4.5%
Narre Warren North	Luke Donnellan	ALP	4.6%
Bellarine	Lisa Neville	ALP	4.8%
Bendigo East	Jacinta Allan	ALP	5.0%
Monbulk	James Merlino	ALP	5.0%
Narre Warren South	Judith Graley	ALP	5.5%
Wendouree	Sharon Knight	ALP	5.8%
Fairly safe
Geelong	Christine Couzens	ALP	6.0%
Buninyong	Geoff Howard	ALP	6.4%
Niddrie	Ben Carroll	ALP	7.7%
Oakleigh	Steve Dimopoulos	ALP	8.2%
Essendon	Danny Pearson	ALP	8.7%
Safe
Melton	Don Nardella	ALP	11.2%
Keysborough	Martin Pakula	ALP	11.9%
Bendigo West	Maree Edwards	ALP	12.2%
Bundoora	Colin Brooks	ALP	12.2%
Altona	Jill Hennessy	ALP	12.6%
Dandenong	Gabrielle Williams	ALP	12.9%
Footscray	Marsha Thomson	ALP	14.5%
Tarneit	Telmo Languiller	ALP	14.6%
Werribee	Tim Pallas	ALP	15.7%
Clarinda	Hong Lim	ALP	15.8%
Sydenham	Natalie Hutchins	ALP	16.3%
Williamstown	Wade Noonan	ALP	16.5%
Pascoe Vale	Lizzie Blandthorn	ALP	16.8%
Lara	John Eren	ALP	17.1%
St Albans	Natalie Suleyman	ALP	17.5%
Yuroke	Ros Spence	ALP	18.5%
Mill Park	Lily D'Ambrosio	ALP	19.9%
Very safe
Kororoit	Marlene Kairouz	ALP	20.0%
Preston	Robin Scott	ALP	24.7%
Broadmeadows	Frank McGuire	ALP	27.8%
Thomastown	Bronwyn Halfpenny	ALP	28.4%

Coalition seats - 2014
Seat	Member	Party	Margin
Marginal
Ripon	Louise Staley	LIB	0.8%
Morwell	Russell Northe	NAT	1.8%
South Barwon	Andrew Katos	LIB	2.9%
Burwood	Graham Watt	LIB	3.2%
Eildon	Cindy McLeish	LIB	3.8%
Bass	Brian Paynter	LIB	4.6%
Bayswater	Heidi Victoria	LIB	4.6%
Mount Waverley	Michael Gidley	LIB	4.6%
Forest Hill	Neil Angus	LIB	4.8%
Caulfield	David Southwick	LIB	4.9%
Ringwood	Dee Ryall	LIB	5.1%
Box Hill	Robert Clark	LIB	5.7%
Fairly safe
Sandringham	Murray Thompson	LIB	7.3%
Hastings	Neale Burgess	LIB	7.6%
Nepean	Martin Dixon	LIB	7.6%
Ferntree Gully	Nick Wakeling	LIB	7.8%
Mildura	Peter Crisp	NAT	8.0% v IND
Rowville	Kim Wells	LIB	8.4%
Hawthorn	John Pesutto	LIB	8.6%
Gembrook	Brad Battin	LIB	9.0%
Croydon	David Hodgett	LIB	9.3%
Evelyn	Christine Fyffe	LIB	9.6%
Benambra	Bill Tilley	LIB	9.7%
Brighton	Louise Asher	LIB	9.8%
Safe
Bulleen	Matthew Guy	LIB	10.6%
Kew	Tim Smith	LIB	10.6%
Polwarth	Terry Mulder	LIB	10.6%
South-West Coast	Denis Napthine	LIB	11.0%
Narracan	Gary Blackwood	LIB	11.3%
Warrandyte	Ryan Smith	LIB	11.6%
Mornington	David Morris	LIB	12.6%
Euroa	Steph Ryan	NAT	14.5%
Gippsland South	Peter Ryan	NAT	15.7%
Malvern	Michael O'Brien	LIB	16.3%
Ovens Valley	Tim McCurdy	NAT	16.6%
Gippsland East	Tim Bull	NAT	17.9%
Very safe
Lowan	Emma Kealy	NAT	21.3%
Murray Plains	Peter Walsh	NAT	22.4%
Crossbench seats - 2014
Prahran	Sam Hibbins	GRN	0.4% v LIB
Melbourne	Ellen Sandell	GRN	2.4% v ALP
Shepparton	Suzanna Sheed	IND	2.6% v NAT
Northcote	Lidia Thorpe	GRN	5.6% v ALP

== Registered parties ==
At the close of nominations, there were 23 parties registered with the Victorian Electoral Commission (VEC), of which 21 contested the election:

- Animal Justice Party
- Australian Conservatives (did not contest)
- Aussie Battler Party
- Australian Country Party/Give It Back
- Australian Greens
- Australian Labor Party
- Australian Liberty Alliance
- Democratic Labour Party
- Derryn Hinch's Justice Party
- Health Australia Party
- Hudson for Northern Victoria
- Liberal Democratic Party
- Liberal Party
- National Party
- Pauline Hanson's One Nation (did not contest)
- Reason Party
- Shooters and Fishers Party
- Transport Matters Party
- Socialist Alliance (contested as part of Victorian Socialists electoral alliance)
- Sustainable Australia
- Victorian Socialists
- Voluntary Euthanasia Party
- Vote 1 Local Jobs

== Candidates and retiring MPs ==
Nominations of candidates opened on 31 October 2018. Nominations for party candidates closed on 8 November, and for independent candidates on 9 November.

A total of 887 candidates nominated for the election, down from 896 at the 2014 election. There were 507 candidates for the Legislative Assembly, the second-highest number on record, down from 545 in 2014. The 380 candidates for the Legislative Council was the highest number of upper house candidates in a Victorian election, up from 351 in 2014.

=== Retiring MPs ===
Members who chose not to renominate are as follows:

==== Labor ====
- Judith Graley MLA (Narre Warren South) – announced 19 August 2017
- Geoff Howard MLA (Buninyong) – announced 15 September 2017
- Sharon Knight MLA (Wendouree) – announced 31 July 2017
- Telmo Languiller MLA (Tarneit) – announced 26 August 2017
- Hong Lim MLA (Clarinda) – announced 5 September 2017
- Wade Noonan MLA (Williamstown) – announced 4 October 2017
- Jude Perera MLA (Cranbourne) – announced 15 September 2017
- Marsha Thomson MLA (Footscray) – announced 21 September 2017
- Khalil Eideh MLC (Western Metropolitan Region) – announced 21 September 2017
- Daniel Mulino MLC (Eastern Victoria Region) – retiring to run for federal House of Representatives

==== Liberal ====
- Louise Asher MLA (Brighton) – announced 11 August 2016
- Martin Dixon MLA (Nepean) – announced 10 August 2016
- Christine Fyffe MLA (Evelyn) – announced 21 October 2016
- Murray Thompson MLA (Sandringham) – announced 24 November 2016
- Richard Dalla-Riva MLC (Eastern Metropolitan Region) – announced 10 February 2017
- Simon Ramsay MLC (Western Victoria Region) – announced 24 July 2018

==== Independent ====
- Don Nardella MLA (Melton) – announced 28 February 2017

=== Disendorsed candidates ===
On 13 November, Neelam Rai, a Liberal candidate for Northern Metropolitan Region, withdrew her candidacy after the Herald Sun revealed that she was the director of an unregistered charity, No Hunger Australia. The Liberal Party also released a statement saying that Rai's nomination form for preselection had "failed to disclose a number of issues of relevance".

On 15 November, the Liberal Party withdrew its endorsement of Meralyn Klein, their candidate for the marginal seat of Yan Yean, after footage emerged of her speaking in an anti-Muslim video produced by the Australian Liberty Alliance. Klein denied any association with the ALA, saying she had been interviewed about an incident where she had been assaulted several years earlier, and the footage had been provided to the ALA and edited into an anti-Muslim video.

As ballot papers had already been printed, both Rai and Klein appeared as Liberal candidates. The Labor Party petitioned the Supreme Court to order the VEC to reprint the ballot papers with Klein's affiliation removed, but the case was dismissed.

On 22 November, two days before Election Day, the Greens ordered a then-unnamed candidate to withdraw from the campaign after an allegation of "serious sexual misconduct" was made. The following day the party revealed the candidate in question was Dominic Phillips, candidate for the seat of Sandringham; he was stood down by the party. As the ballot papers had already been printed, Phillips stood as the Greens candidate and won over 8% of the vote.

== Issues ==
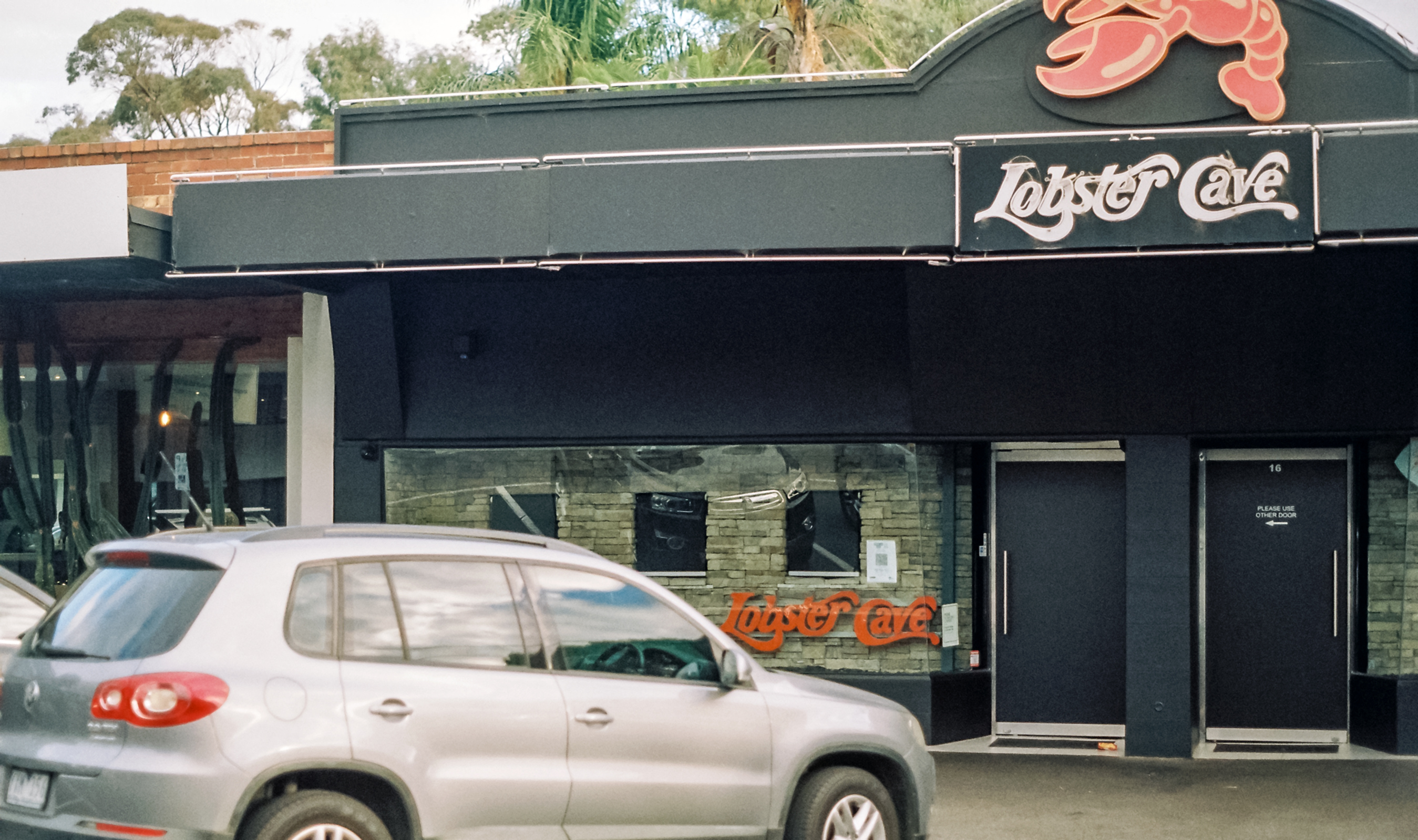
Lobster Cave restaurant prior to closing in 2025, Guys meeting there with Maddefferi in 2017 caused controversy

A year before the election Opposition leader Matthew Guy was slammed for a dinner with alleged Mafia member Tony Maddefei at Lobster Cave restaurant at Beaumaris Victoria. On 28 October both Labor and the Coalition launched their campaigns, with Labor making health, paramedics and improved ambulance response times a priority, while the Coalition focused on cutting taxes, better managing population growth and cracking down on crime. Labor and the Coalition pledged $23.3 billion and $24.8 billion respectively, more than double pledged during the 2010 and 2014 elections, excluding the proposed Suburban Rail Loop and high speed rail for regional services which would require future governments to fund. Labor pledged to invest substantially more money than the Coalition in health, with $1.3bn in promises to boost nursing numbers and $395.8m to provide every state school student with free dental check-ups and procedures and $232m to build seven new early parenting centres; in contrast to the Coalition whose signature health policy was constructing a new hospital in Warragul, the biggest city in the rapidly expanding West Gippsland region.

The Coalition's leading message of the campaign was to "get back in control" of the state's allegedly burgeoning crime problem. The party promised tougher bail conditions than Labor, saying that anyone who breaches bail will be jailed. In addition mandatory sentencing would become more commonplace, with minimum sentences for repeat violent offenders and people deemed possible terror threats could be forced to wear electronic monitoring devices, a proposal made after the stabbing attack in the city which occurred during the campaign. The Liberal-Nationals and newspapers which supported them made frequent reference to an alleged "African gang problem" in Melbourne, as an attack line on the Labour incumbents, which meant overt and covert discussion of race and ethnicity with relation to crime were a strong element of the Coalition campaign.

The divisions between the parties over social issues were pronounced, as the Coalition promised to axe the safe injecting room in Richmond, the Safe Schools program for LGBTI children in state secondary schools and the process for a formalised treaty for Indigenous Victorians. The Coalition also promised to reinstate religious instruction classes in state schools, something removed from classes and made an opt-in process by Labor.

Arguably the most pressing issue of the campaign was public transport and infrastructure. Melbourne's record population growth of more than 125,000 people a year made both party leaders focus on big transport initiatives. Labor unveiled a $50 billion underground rail loop of the suburbs surrounding the city, though admitted the project would not be completed before 2050 and actually pledged $300 million for a business study. The Coalition instead proposed a $19 billion "European-style" regional rail network that would rebuild the entire network and include high-speed rail on four lines, travelling up to 200 km an hour. Both parties agreed on the West Gate Tunnel, North East Link and Metro Rail projects, though the Coalition pledged to bring back the defunct East West Link project which was scrapped at a cost of $1 billion by the Labor Government.

Minor party the Greens sought to expand their numbers in parliament and make further gains in inner-city/suburban seats held by Labor such as Albert Park, Brunswick and Richmond. The party proposed a dedicated bike "superlane" stretching 17 kilometres from Elsternwick railway station to Coburg, as well as further cycling routes connecting Box Hill and Richmond, Ringwood and Croydon and a connection from the Burwood Highway through to Knox and Deakin University. Overall, most Greens policies were more closely aligned with Labor policies than the Coalition, a fact acknowledged by Greens leader Samantha Ratnam who said she would seek to negotiate with Labor to form government in the event of a hung parliament. Labor leader Daniel Andrews reacted negatively to this possibility saying "no deal will be offered" and criticising the Greens for allegedly "refusing to call out denigration of women", in reference to past sexist comments made by the Greens candidate for the seat of Footscray, Angus McAlpine.

The only state leaders debate between Andrews and Guy was held on 21 November on the pay TV Sky News Australia.

The total number of people who voted early in the last two weeks of the campaign was 1,639,202, which made up 40% of the eligible voting population.

== Opinion polling ==
=== Graphical summary ===
Two-party-preferred vote.

Primary vote.

Aggregate data of voting intention from all opinion polling since the last election. A local regression trend is shown in a solid line.

=== Voting intention ===
In the lead-up to the election, Poll aggregation site Poll Bludger placed the two-party-preferred vote for Labor at 53.5%, coupled with primary vote shares at 41.0% for Labor, 39.8% for the Liberal/National Coalition, and 11.1% for the Greens. Election Analyst Antony Green stated on the ABC's election coverage that the result was "four to five percent better (for Labor) than all the opinion polls, which is the most out I've seen opinion polls in a long time in this country".

The Liberal Party wrote in their campaign review that their data gathered in their internal research in marginal seats was "fundamentally wrong", which lead to resources and campaigners being diverted from marginal Liberal-held seats to "target "Labor" seats on the false assumption that [the Liberal Party] had already won [Liberal held] seats".

Legislative Assembly (lower house) polling
Date	Firm			Primary vote			TPP vote
Date	Firm	LIB	NAT	ALP	GRN	OTH	ALP	L/NP
24 November 2018 election		30.4%	4.8%	42.9%	10.7%	11.2%	57.3%	42.7%
24 November 2018	YouGov-Galaxy (Exit Poll)	38%*		41%	12%	9%	55%	45%
23 November 2018	Roy Morgan	33%*		39%	13%	15%	54%	46%
23 November 2018	Newspoll	40%*		41%	11%	8%	53.5%	46.5%
21 November 2018	uComms/ReachTEL	35.9%*		38.7%	10.4%	9.9%	54%	46%
21 November 2018	YouGov	40%*		40%	11%	9%	53%	47%
14 November 2018	ReachTEL	36.8%*		40.4%	10.3%	12.5%	56%	44%
24–28 Oct 2018	Newspoll	39%*		41%	11%	9%	54%	46%
22–24 Oct 2018	YouGov	39%*		40%	12%	9%	53%	47%
3 October 2018	ReachTEL	38.8%*		35.9%	10.9%	14.4%	52%	48%
11–13 Sep 2018	YouGov	40%*		42%	–	–	53%	47%
9 August 2018	YouGov	42%*		38%	10%	10%	51%	49%
5 July 2018	ReachTEL	39.4%*		35.4%	10.5%	14.7%	51%	49%
13–16 Apr 2018	Newspoll	41%*		38%	11%	10%	51%	49%
Feb–Mar 2018	Newspoll	39%*		37%	11%	13%	52%	48%
Oct–Dec 2017	Essential	43%*		38%	10%	9%	51%	49%
6 December 2017	Galaxy	41%*		36%	10%	12%	50%	50%
Jul–Sep 2017	Essential	42%*		39%	10%	9%	52%	48%
17–18 Jun 2017	Galaxy	44%*		33%	8%	14%	47%	53%
7 March 2017	ReachTEL	39.8%*		30.3%	8%	15.7%	46%	54%
15–16 Feb 2017	Galaxy	41%*		37%	10%	12%	51%	49%
Oct 2016	Roy Morgan	36%*		39%	13%	12%	56.5%	43.5%
1 September 2016	ReachTEL	40.1%*		34.6%	10.7%	–	51%	49%
Aug 2016	Roy Morgan	36%*		37.5%	13.5%	13.5%	55.5%	44.5%
Aug 2016	ReachTEL	42.7%*		35.0%	13.0%	9.3%	52%	48%
Aug 2016	Roy Morgan	38%*		13%	40.5%	8.5%	56%	44%
Mar 2016	Roy Morgan	39%*		40.5%	12%	8.5%	55%	45%
Nov–Dec 2015	Roy Morgan	38%*		40.5%	13%	8.5%	56%	44%
Nov–Dec 2015	Newspoll	38%	5%	39%	12%	6%	52%	48%
16 October 2015	Roy Morgan	39%*		40%	14.5%	6.5%	55.5%	44.5%
28–31 Aug 2015	Roy Morgan	35.5%*		39%	16.5%	9%	57%	43%
31 Jul-3 Aug 2015	Roy Morgan	38%*		41%	14%	7%	56.5%	43.5%
May–Jun 2015	Newspoll	32%	3%	41%	14%	10%	58%	42%
27 May 2015	Roy Morgan	38.5%*		43.5%	12.5%	5.5%	56.5%	43.5%
10–13 Apr 2015	Roy Morgan	40%*		41%	11.5%	7.5%	54%	46%
13–15 Mar 2015	Roy Morgan	38%*		43%	11.5%	7.5%	56%	44%
14–16 Feb 2015	Roy Morgan	39.5%*		41.5%	11.5%	7.5%	54.5%	45.5%
16–18 Jan 2015	Roy Morgan	35%*		45%	11.5%	8.5%	59%	41%
4 December 2014 Matthew Guy becomes Liberal leader and leader of the opposition
29 November 2014 election		36.5%	5.5%	38.1%	11.5%	8.4%	52.0%	48.0%
25–28 Nov 2014	Ipsos	42%*		35%	15%	8%	52%	48%
24–27 Nov 2014	Newspoll	36%	4%	39%	12%	9%	52%	48%
27 November 2014	ReachTEL	34.5%	5.2%	38.3%	13.5%	8.5%	52%	48%
26–27 Nov 2014	Roy Morgan	44%*		36%	13.5%	6.5%	50%	50%
25–26 Nov 2014	Galaxy	40%*		39%	13%	8%	52%	48%
7–24 Nov 2014	Essential	40%*		39%	13%	8%	52%	48%
* Indicates a combined Liberal/National primary vote.
Newspoll polling is published in The Australian.

=== Preferred Premier and satisfaction ===
View source data.
Opinion polls conducted for preferred premier

Better Premier and satisfaction polling*
Date	Firm	Better Premier		Andrews		Guy
Date	Firm	Andrews	Guy	Satisfied	Dissatisfied	Satisfied	Dissatisfied
24–28 Oct 2018	Newspoll	45%	29%	45%	40%	31%	46%
22–24 Oct 2018	YouGov	not asked		44%	35%	24%	42%
7 October 2018	ReachTEL	51.3%	48.7%	not asked
11–13 Sep 2018	YouGov	not asked		40%	42%	25%	44%
9 August 2018	YouGov	40%	33%	not asked
5 July 2018	ReachTEL	50.6%	49.4%	not asked
13–16 Apr 2018	Newspoll	41%	34%	43%	47%	32%	45%
Feb–Mar 2018	Newspoll	41%	30%	46%	41%	36%	37%
6 December 2017	Galaxy	41%	25%	not asked
17–18 Jun 2017	Galaxy	41%	29%	not asked
7 March 2017	ReachTEL	29.6%	34.7%	not asked
Oct 2016	Roy Morgan	59%	41%	not asked
1 September 2016	ReachTEL	49%	51%	not asked
May 2016	Roy Morgan	63.5%	36.5%	not asked
Nov–Dec 2015	Newspoll	43%	26%	43%	39%	27%	40%
16 October 2015	Roy Morgan	63.5%	36.5%	not asked
31 Jul-3 Aug 2015	Roy Morgan	64%	36%	not asked
25–28 Nov 2014	Newspoll	48%	24%	51%	32%	35%	29%
10–13 Apr 2015	Roy Morgan	63%	37%	not asked
10–13 Apr 2015	Roy Morgan	59.5%	40.5%	not asked
13–15 Mar 2015	Roy Morgan	62.5%	37.5%	not asked
14–16 Feb 2015	Roy Morgan	62.5%	37.5%	not asked
16–18 Jan 2015	Roy Morgan	66.5%	33.5%	not asked
4 December 2014 Guy replaces Napthine		Andrews	Napthine	Andrews		Napthine
29 November 2014 election		–	–	–	–	–	–
25–28 Nov 2014	Ipsos	42%	44%	42%	43%	49%	40%
24–27 Nov 2014	Newspoll	37%	41%	38%	43%	41%	45%
26–27 Nov 2014	Roy Morgan	49.5%	50.5%	not asked
25–26 Nov 2014	Galaxy	38%	41%	not asked
* Remainder were "uncommitted" or "other/neither". † Participants were forced to choose.
Newspoll polling is published in The Australian.

== Newspaper endorsements ==
Daily newspapers		Sunday newspapers		Alternative newspapers	
Newspaper	Endorsement	Newspaper	Endorsement	Newspaper	Endorsement
The Age	Labor	The Sunday Age	Labor	Green Left Weekly	Socialists
The Australian	Liberal				
The Australian Financial Review	Labor				
Herald Sun	Liberal	Sunday Herald Sun	Liberal		

== Results ==
=== Legislative Assembly ===
↓
55	3	3	6	21
ALP	GRN	IND	NAT	LIB

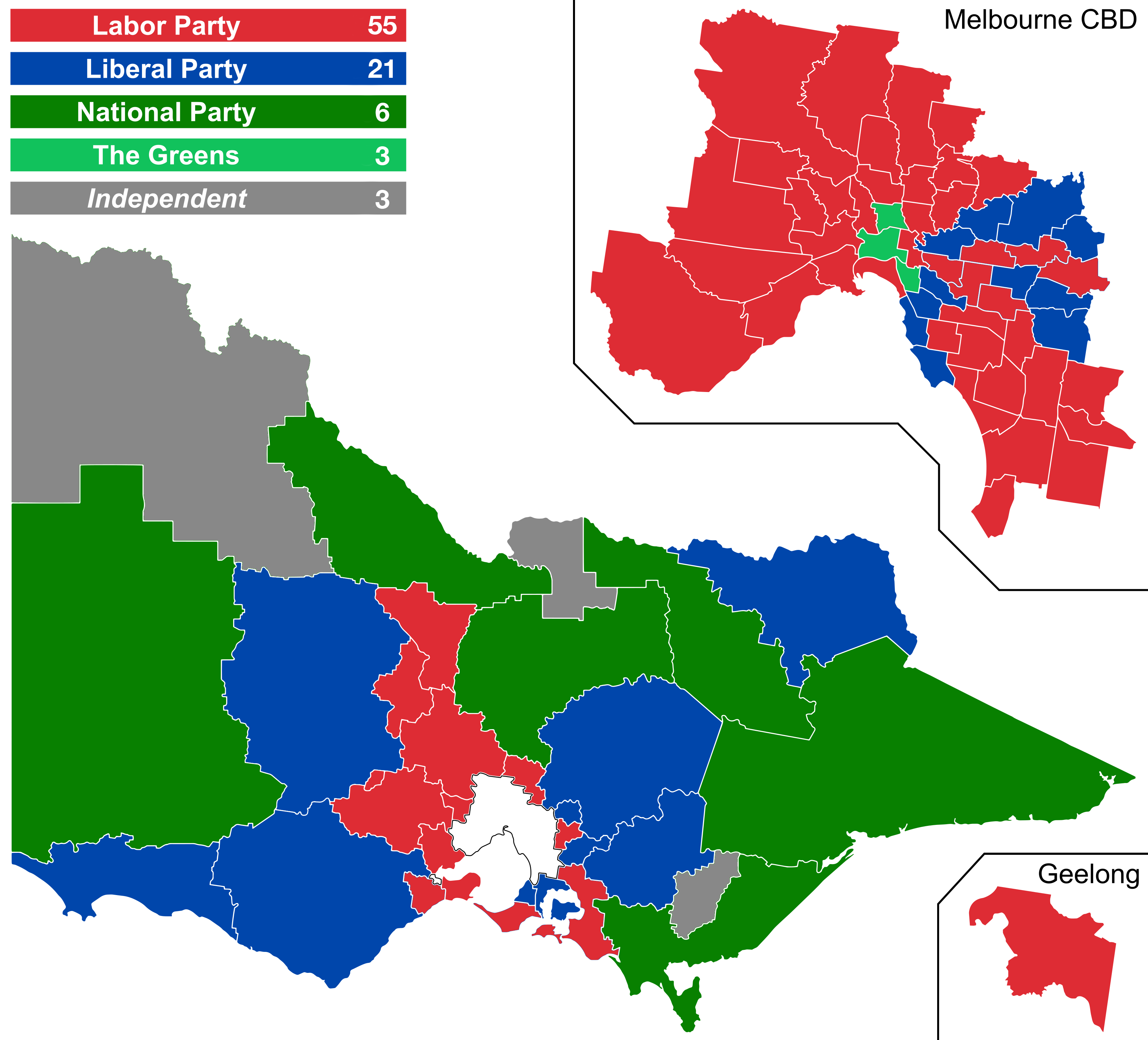
Winning party by electorate.

Legislative Assembly (IRV) – (CV)
Party	Votes	%	Swing	Seats	Change
Labor	1,506,460	42.86	▲+4.77	55	▲8
Liberal	1,069,287	30.43	▼−6.04	21	▼9
National	167,625	4.77	▼−0.76	6	▼2
Coalition total	1,236,912	35.19	−6.80	27	▼11
Greens	376,470	10.71	▼−0.77	3	▲1*
Animal Justice	63,970	1.82	▲+1.59	0	Steady
Shooters, Fishers and Farmers	24,257	0.69	▲+0.61	0	Steady
Democratic Labour	24,097	0.69	▲+0.60	0	Steady
Victorian Socialists	15,442	0.44	New	0	Steady
Reason	12,695	0.36	▲+0.10	0	Steady
Transport Matters	10,313	0.29	New	0	Steady
Justice	9,277	0.26	New	0	Steady
Sustainable Australia	8,183	0.23	New	0	Steady
Country	6,566	0.19	▼−1.10	0	Steady
Liberal Democratic	4,030	0.12	New	0	Steady
Aussie Battler	1,281	0.04	New	0	Steady
Liberty Alliance	1,232	0.04	New	0	Steady
Independents	213,289	6.07	▲+3.47	3	▲2**
Total valid votes	3,514,474	94.17	–	–	–
Invalid/blank votes	217,592	5.83	–	–	–
Total	3,732,066	100	–	88	Steady
Registered voters / Turnout	4,139,326	90.16	–	–	–
Two-party-preferred vote***
Labor	1,988,434	57.30	▲+5.31	55	▲8
Coalition	1,481,975	42.70	▼−5.31	27	▼11

Two-Party-Preferred Swing

* Compared with results at 2014 election. The Greens went into the 2018 election with 3 seats following the Northcote by-election, 2017
** Compared with results at 2014 election. There were 3 independent members at the dissolution of parliament following resignations by Russell Northe and Don Nardella.
*** Based on the 87 districts for which the Liberal/National Coalition fielded a candidate. The Liberal Party did not field a candidate in Richmond. Labor received 73.07% of the two-party-preferred vote in that district at the 2014 election.

Popular vote
Labor	42.86%
Liberal	30.43%
Greens	10.71%
National	4.77%
Independents	6.07%
Other	5.16%

Two-party-preferred vote
Labor	57.30%
Coalition	42.70%

Seats
Labor	62.50%
Coalition	30.68%
Greens	3.41%
Independents	3.41%

Seats changing hands
Seat	2014 election			Swing	2018 election		
Seat	Party	Member	Margin	Swing	Margin	Member	Party
Bass	Liberal	Brian Paynter	4.6	+6.9	2.4	Jordan Crugnale	Labor
Bayswater	Liberal	Heidi Victoria	4.6	+5.0	0.4	Jackson Taylor	Labor
Box Hill	Liberal	Robert Clark	5.7	+7.8	2.1	Paul Hamer	Labor
Brunswick	Labor	Jane Garrett	2.2	+2.8	0.6	Tim Read	Greens
Burwood	Liberal	Graham Watt	3.2	+6.5	3.3	Will Fowles	Labor
Hawthorn	Liberal	John Pesutto	8.6	+9.0	0.4	John Kennedy	Labor
Mildura	National	Peter Crisp	8.0	+8.4	0.3	Ali Cupper	Independent
Morwell	National	Russell Northe*	1.8	+3.6	1.8	Russell Northe	Independent
Mount Waverley	Liberal	Michael Gidley	4.6	+6.4	1.8	Matt Fregon	Labor
Nepean	Liberal	Martin Dixon	7.6	+8.5	0.9	Chris Brayne	Labor
Northcote	Greens	Lidia Thorpe**	−6.0	−4.3	1.7	Kat Theophanous	Labor
Ringwood	Liberal	Dee Ryall	5.1	+7.9	2.8	Dustin Halse	Labor
South Barwon	Liberal	Andrew Katos	2.9	+7.5	4.6	Darren Cheeseman	Labor
* Russell Northe was elected as a Nationals MP but resigned from the party in 2017. The margin given is his margin as a Nationals candidate in 2014. ** Lidia Thorpe won Northcote from Labor for the Greens at a by-election in November 2017. The margin here is the Greens margin at the 2014 election.

Labor's victory came primarily on the strength of a larger-than-expected swing in eastern Melbourne, which has historically decided elections in Victoria. According to the ABC's election analyst Antony Green, the swing, which exceeded both the statewide swing and the most optimistic projections, resulted in the eastern suburbs being swept up in a "band of red". They also took a number of seats in areas considered Liberal heartland. Hawthorn, for instance, fell to Labor for only the second time ever and for the first time in 63 years. Bass elected a Labor member for the first time ever; the seat and its predecessors, Gippsland West and Westernport, had been in conservative hands for all but two terms since 1909.

=== Legislative Council ===
Legislative Council (STV/GVT) – (CV)
Party	Votes	%	Swing	Seats	Change
Labor	1,406,122	39.22	▲5.76	18	▲4
Liberal (metropolitan)	615,050	17.15	▼3.67	7	▼3
Liberal/National joint ticket	439,930	12.27	▼3.04		
Liberal (regional)				3	▼1
National				1	▼1
Coalition total	1,054,980	29.42	▼6.71	11	▼5
Greens	331,479	9.25	▼1.50	1	▼4
Justice	134,266	3.75	New	3	▲3
Shooters, Fishers and Farmers	108,280	3.02	▲1.37	1	▼1
Liberal Democratic	89,428	2.50	▼0.56	2	▲2
Animal Justice	88,520	2.47	▲0.77	1	▲1
Democratic Labour	75,221	2.10	▼0.22	0	▼1*
Reason	49,013	1.37	▼1.26	1	Steady
Voluntary Euthanasia	42,611	1.19	▲0.70	0	Steady
Aussie Battler	33,172	0.93	New	0	Steady
Victorian Socialists	32,603	0.91	New	0	Steady
Sustainable Australia	29,831	0.83	New	1	▲1
Health Australia	28,132	0.79	New	0	Steady
Country	24,295	0.68	+0.00	0	Steady
Transport Matters	22,051	0.62	New	1	▲1
Liberty Alliance	20,065	0.56	New	0	Steady
Hudson for Northern Victoria	6,363	0.18	New	0	Steady
Vote 1 Local Jobs	5,338	0.15	▼0.06	0	▼1
Independents and ungrouped	2,556	0.07	▼0.06	0	**
Total valid votes	3,583,478	96.04	–	–	–
Invalid/blank votes	147,713	3.96	–	–	–
Total	3,731,191	100	–	40	Steady
Registered voters / Turnout	4,139,326	90.14	–	–	–

* - Compared with results at 2014 election. The DLP went into the 2018 election with no Legislative Council seats after Rachel Carling-Jenkins initially defected to the Conservatives and eventually sat as an independent.
** - Compared with results at 2014 election. There was one independent at the dissolution of parliament after Rachel Carling-Jenkin's defections from the DLP and then the Conservatives.

==== Legislative Council seats table ====
Region	Seats held
Eastern Metropolitan	
Eastern Victoria	
Northern Metropolitan	
Northern Victoria	
South-Eastern Metropolitan	
Southern Metropolitan	
Western Metropolitan	
Western Victoria	

Party key:

Labor
Liberal
Greens
National
Justice
Liberal Democratic
Reason
Animal Justice
Shooters, Fishers, Farmers
Sustainable Australia
Transport Matters

Labor benefited from an enormous swing toward it and consequently picked up at least one seat in most regions, winning 18 seats. The swing against the Coalition in the lower house was replicated in the Council and they lost five seats to finish with only 11. Most of the minor parties were the beneficiaries of above-the-line voting, though Reason Party MP Fiona Patten was re-elected on the back of a strong below-the-line vote in Northern Metropolitan. The Greens were the biggest losers of the system, losing four of their five upper house members and only re-electing party leader Samantha Ratnam. Derryn Hinch's Justice Party was the biggest winner on the crossbench, picking up three seats, however the party's member for Western Metropolitan (Catherine Cumming) defected to sit as an independent prior to being sworn in. The Liberal Democrats won two seats.

Richard Willingham, the ABC News state political correspondent, described the result as proof of Labor's continued "dominance" of state politics, noting that "enough progressive parties [won] spots on the crossbench to potentially provide an avenue for any controversial legislation."

== Aftermath ==
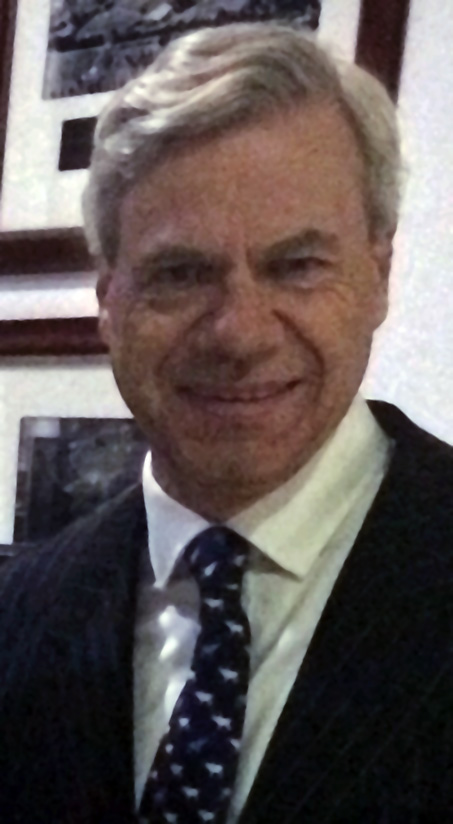
Victorian Liberal President Michael Kroger resigned following the election due to the Liberals defeat

Michael O'Brien replaced Matthew Guy as Leader of the Opposition following Guy's resignation. Victorian state Liberal President Michael Kroger resigned following the election result and the Liberals defeat.
