= Health Australia Party =

Political party in Australia

- President: Kerry Bone
- Founded: 2013; 13 years ago (as Natural Medicine Party)
- Dissolved: 19 January 2024; 2 years ago
- Succeeded by: HEART Party (17 August 2023 − 10 October 2023)
- Ideology: Naturopathy; Anti-fluoridation; Anti-vaccination

Website
- healthaustraliaparty.com.au

The Health Australia Party (HAP) was a political party in Australia, founded in 2013 as the Natural Medicine Party. It adopted its current name in 2015.

HAP first contested an election under that name in 2016, where it secured almost 1.2% of first preference votes in New South Wales and less than 0.5% in three other states. The party also contested the 2018 Victorian state election, running for five legislative council seats.

The party has been criticised in the main for being anti-vaccination In addition, criticisms have been levelled concerning their views on pseudoscience, alternative medicine, and conspiracy theories, as well as for its policies and misleading name.

The party was deregistered by the Australian Electoral Commission in 2022. In August 2023, the party merged with the Informed Medical Options Party to form the HEART Party, however the merger collapsed in October 2023 and HAP returned as a standalone party. On 19 January 2024, the party announced it would disband.

== Policies and philosophy ==
According to its website, the party was founded with a view to “promoting open and transparent Government decision making, balance and honesty of information, and stimulating individual freedom of choice and thought.” Party co-founder Isaac Golden has written that the party was founded, in part, "to respond to the well funded, sustained and coordinated attacks on natural medicine in Australia which have placed our homeopathic profession at risk, as well as all natural therapists".

The party's policies are based on five pillars: people, economy, environment, democracy, and society. The party's president, Kerry Bone, stated on the party's website that, "True freedom of choice in health care, facilitated by a supportive and empathetic government and informed by balanced media representation, is what we seek".

According to the ABC, the party "also supports animal rights, food cooperatives, the Tobin tax system, which supports the taxing of foreign currency transactions, more academic freedom in universities, a Swiss-style national service system, and greater restrictions on herbicides and pesticides".

=== Criticism of 'No Jab, No Pay/Play' legislation ===
During the 2016 elections, the HAP opposed the Coalition's 'no jab, no pay' (also 'no jab, no play') legislation. On its website, the party describes its criticism of the "no jab, no pay" legislation as support for informed consent, and expresses concern about penalising unvaccinated children by excluding them from preschool. HAP cites the Royal Australasian College of Physicians, who also opposed the regulation, and references vaccinations programs in Denmark and Japan, which provide less coverage than the Australian system but produce excellent results in controlling disease. During the 2021 Western Australian state election Bassem Tadros, lead candidate in the Agricultural region for the Health Australia Party reiterated that criticism of the current legislation on the COVID-19 vaccination program in Australia be considered from the position of support for informed consent and "personal choice".

=== Ideological criticisms ===
Steven Novella, a neurologist most notable for his work within the skeptics community, has written that the party subscribes to the Big Pharma conspiracy theory and takes a number of pseudoscientific and anti-science stances such as promoting homeopathy and claiming that electro-smog gives rise to electromagnetic hypersensitivity. Novella writes that "The HAP appears to be just a group of CAM practitioners trying to use the political process to advance their quack profession".

John Dwyer of the Australian Health Reform Alliance stated during the 2016 election campaign that he was "concerned" that the party could be elected based on its polling position in New South Wales, saying, "Even allowing that they're well-intentioned, the policies that they're putting forward are dangerous and frankly ignorant." Andrew Miller of the Australian Medical Association charged that the party's new name was misleading, stating, "There should be some requirement of honesty in the way that these party names are put forward and I think this is getting pretty close to the borderline of being exactly the opposite of what its name suggests."

== History ==
The Natural Medicine Party was founded in 2013 by naturopath Andrew Patterson. It was involved in Glenn Druery's Minor Party Alliance.

The party was rebranded in 2015 after 'common goals' were found between the Natural Medicine Party and four other persons to create the Health Australia Party.

At the 2016 Australian federal election, the party fielded senate candidates for New South Wales, Queensland, Victoria and Western Australia. It was drawn the advantageous first position on the ballot in New South Wales, with Andrew Patterson the lead candidate. The party gained less than 0.5% of first-preference votes in each state except New South Wales where it gained slightly over 1%.

During the campaign, the party came under fire for their anti-vaccination policies, including by the Australian Medical Association, and the Green Party. The party denied this, with party spokesman Jason Woodforth telling ABC News that the lack of support for the 'no jab, no play' legislation in Victoria did not mean it was anti-vaccination, and went on to say that the party "believes in safe and effective immunisation [and] always has."

In 2017, Fluoride Free WA became the Western Australian branch of the Health Australia Party.

The party contested the 2018 Victorian state election, aiming for legislative council seats in the Southern Metro, Northern Metro, Eastern Metro, Western Metro and Eastern Victoria regions.

The party fielded candidates at the 2019 Australian federal election.

== See also ==
- Fluoride Free WA
- List of political parties in Australia
