= Hudson for Northern Victoria =

Australian political party

- Leader: Josh Hudson
- Founded: July 2018
- Ideology: Regionalism
- Colours: Orange

Website
- hudson4nv.com

Hudson for Northern Victoria (H4NV) was a political party based in Tatura, Victoria that had been formed in July 2018 to contest the Northern Victoria Region of the Victorian Legislative Council at the 2018 state election. Although aiming to "offer an alternative" to the region, it did not release any policies.

It was named after its founder and lead candidate, Josh Hudson.

Despite ostensibly focusing on the Northern Victoria Region, the party also fielded candidates in other regions. This led to H4NV being accused of participating in preference harvesting deals organised by "preference whisperer" Glenn Druery, but Hudson asserted that his preference deals were arranged personally by himself. By contesting an election as a party, a candidate can accept votes below and above the line on election day.

At the election the party received 6,363 votes or 0.18% of the votes.
