= Tarang Chawla =

Indian-born Australian activist

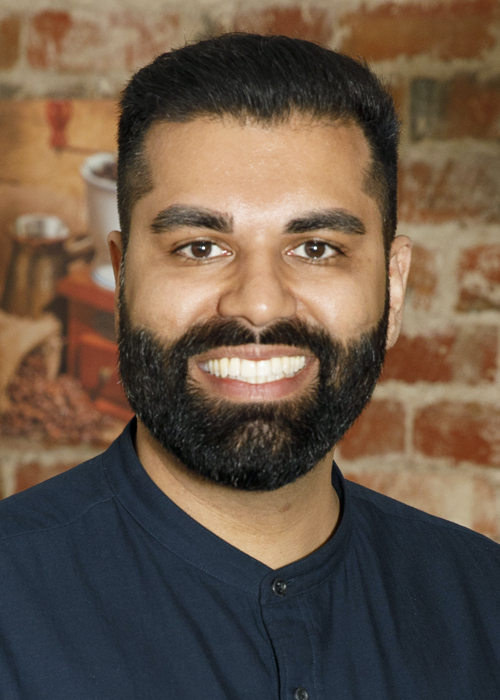
- Tarang Chawla
- Citizenship: Australian
- Education: Melbourne High School; The University of Melbourne
- Known for: Activism writer lawyer
- Political party: Independent
- Website: www.tarangchawla.com

Tarang Chawla is an Indian-born Australian writer, lawyer, activist, commissioner and former independent political candidate.

Following the murder of his sister Nikita Chawla in 2015, Chawla became an activist against men's violence.

In November 2016, Chawla was named as the 2017 Young Australian of the Year finalist in Victoria. In May 2017, Chawla was the recipient of the University of Melbourne Rising Star Award for Young Alumni. In July 2017, Chawla was awarded the AFL Community Champion Award by the Carlton Football Club's Blues Foundation.

== Background and early life ==
Chawla attended Melbourne High School from 2001 to 2004, where he was SRC Vice President and awarded Full Colours for School Service.

Chawla holds a Bachelor of Laws and Bachelor of Arts (Media & Communications) double degree and a Diploma in Arts (Gender Studies) with first-class honours from The University of Melbourne.

== Activism and advocacy ==
Chawla is an advocate for the rights of victim survivors. Chawla is an Ambassador for White Ribbon, Our Watch and the InTouch Multicultural Centre Against Family Violence.

Since 2016, Chawla has been an independent advocate for the rights of victims to the Daniel Andrews Labor state government as a founding board member of the Victim Survivors' Advisory Council and the Ministerial Taskforce for the Prevention of Family Violence.

Chawla has written on men's violence against women, discrimination, racism, masculinity, gender equality and human rights.

Chawla has written it the media and Australian television and radio networks. Chawla was profiled by men's magazine GQ Australia in their March 2017 edition.

Junkee named Chawla as one of the "young overachievers giving Australia a good name". Australian magazine The Cusp named Chawla in their list of 18 young visionaries with a 'bold plan for Australia's future'. Other visionaries included writer Benjamin Law, Yasmin Abdel-Magied and James Mathison.

== Awards ==
Chawla was named a Young Australian of the Year Finalist for Victoria in 2017.

In May 2017, the University of Melbourne presented Chawla with the Arts Alumni Rising Star Award for his "leadership and community advocacy against violence in Australia."

In July 2017, Chawla was presented with the Community Champion Award from the Carlton Blues Foundation in a special ceremony held at the Melbourne Cricket Ground (MCG) Carlton Respects Round during Round 17 of the AFL Premiership season.

In March 2019, Chawla was named as one of the Impact 25 Award Winners by Pro Bono Australia, recognising him as one of the Top 25 Most Influential People Working for Social Change in Australia.

In August 2019, Chawla was named as one of 12 Finalists for the Young Community Achiever of the Year in the India Australia Business & Community Awards. In October 2019 Chawla was presented with the Young Community Achiever of the Year Award at the India Australia Business & Community Awards.

In October 2020, Chawla was named as one of Australia's Top 40 Under 40 Most Influential Asian-Australians.

== 2018 Victorian state election ==
Chawla ran for the Victorian Legislative Council for the South Eastern Metropolitan Region.
