= Transport Matters Party =

- Founders: Rod Barton; André Baruch
- Founded: 9 January 2018
- Registered: 30 April 2018
- Dissolved: 28 July 2023
- Ideology: Taxi industry advocacy Ban on Uber; Environmentalism
- Colours: Orange
- Victorian Legislative Council: 1 / 40 (2018−2022)

Website
- www.transportmatters.org.au

The Transport Matters Party was an Australian political party active in Victoria. The party was registered with the Victorian Electoral Commission on 30 April 2018, after an application was received by the VEC on 9 January 2018.

Co-founder Rod Barton announced on 23 June 2023 that the party would disband after an unsuccessful membership drive. It was formally dissolved on 28 July 2023.

== History ==
The party was co-founded by Rod Barton and André Baruch, both hire car operators.

Most of the party's members are taxi drivers or taxi licence owners involved in a class action lawsuit against Uber for loss of income between 2014 and 2017, when the company operated in Victoria as an illegal taxi operation. Uber was legalised in Victoria in August 2017 following the deregulation of the taxi/ride-share industry in the state.

In May 2019, more than 6,000 taxi and car-hire drivers, operators and licence owners across four states commenced the class action in the Victorian Supreme Court.

Transport Matters was registered federally on 24 March 2020. However, the party was voluntarily de-registered federally on 16 December 2021, having never competed at a federal election.

== Policies ==
The party described itself as possessing a centre-left policy agenda; in addition to the party's core focus on transport, it also championed environmental issues and small business interests. The party advocated for major transport projects including the East West Link, the North East Link, the West Gate Tunnel, the Suburban Rail Loop and a fully publicly-owned Melbourne Airport rail line.

The party's policy priorities included:

- Commercial Passenger Vehicle Industry
- Addressing Homelessness
- Free Tram Zone
- Regional Bus Services
- Improving the Transport and Infrastructure Network
- Public Transport

=== Commercial Passenger Vehicle Industry ===
- Opposed to the deregulation of the vehicle for hire, taxicab and hire car industry in Victoria.
- That perpetual taxi and hire car licence holders in Victoria are fully compensated for the compulsory acquisition of their property (licences).
- That Uber entered the Victorian industry illegally in 2017.
- Improve driver income.
- Introduce environmentally sustainable vehicle fleet.
- Minimum ANCAP 5 Star safety rating for commercial passenger vehicles (CPVs).
- Compulsory road worthy certificate required with license renewal.
- Proof of insurance.
- Identification on vehicle that you are a Commercial Passenger Vehicle.
- That CPVs should be exempt from tolls.

=== Homelessness ===
- The party supports housing first as 'it is important that every Australian has access to safe, stable and affordable housing."
- Additional crisis and transitional housing.
- Additional resources including housing, social works and mental health workers.
- Early intervention through the provision of additional wrap around services at the crisis and transitional housing stage.
- Need for additional mental health nurses and psychologists.

=== Public Transport ===
- Public transport should be free for all passengers under the age of 18 or over the age of 65.
- Should be free for full-time students.
- Should be reduced for post-graduate students.
- Victoria's Free Tram Zone should be extended to include major inner-city hospitals and academic precincts.
- Provision of safe bike storage at every bus, train and tram stop.
- Real time GPS information at every tram, train and bus stop.
- A full review of the bus services in the outer suburbs should be conducted to improve the network.

=== Bicycle Infrastructure ===
- The party supports the 'One Meter apart' policy to protect cyclists from traffic.
- Community consultation for the implementation of bike lanes.
- Inclusion of mountain bike trails and bike parks in local council areas.
- Educating young Australians on bike safety.
- Supports the implementation of legislation to protect pedestrians injured by cyclists.

=== Other Areas ===
- Improving rural and regional towns ability to connect by looking into alternative bus network and public transport options.
- Removing toll roads and making them publicly owned.
- Increasing transparency between government departments and the public to improve outcomes.
- Improving Australia's take up of electric and hydrogen vehicles and power.

== Electoral history ==
At the 2018 Victorian state election, the party was the beneficiary of a highly convoluted series of preference flows in the group voting ticket for the Legislative Council organised by Glenn Druery. With these beneficial preferences it was estimated that the party could get elected on less than 0.3% of the vote in the Eastern Metropolitan Region. Ultimately, the party polled 0.62% of the vote and Barton was elected to the Legislative Council for a four-year term.

=== Victorian Legislative Council ===
Year	No of votes	% of vote	Seats won	+/–	Notes
2018	22,051	0.62 (#17)	1 / 40	▲1	Shared balance of power
2022	10,605	0.28 (#21)	0 / 40	▼1	

== See also ==
- Bullet Train for Australia
- Public Transport Party (1985)
- Taxi Operators Political Service (1997−2001)
- Transport in Australia
