= Walter Mikac =

Australian pharmacist (born 1962)

Walter Mikac AM
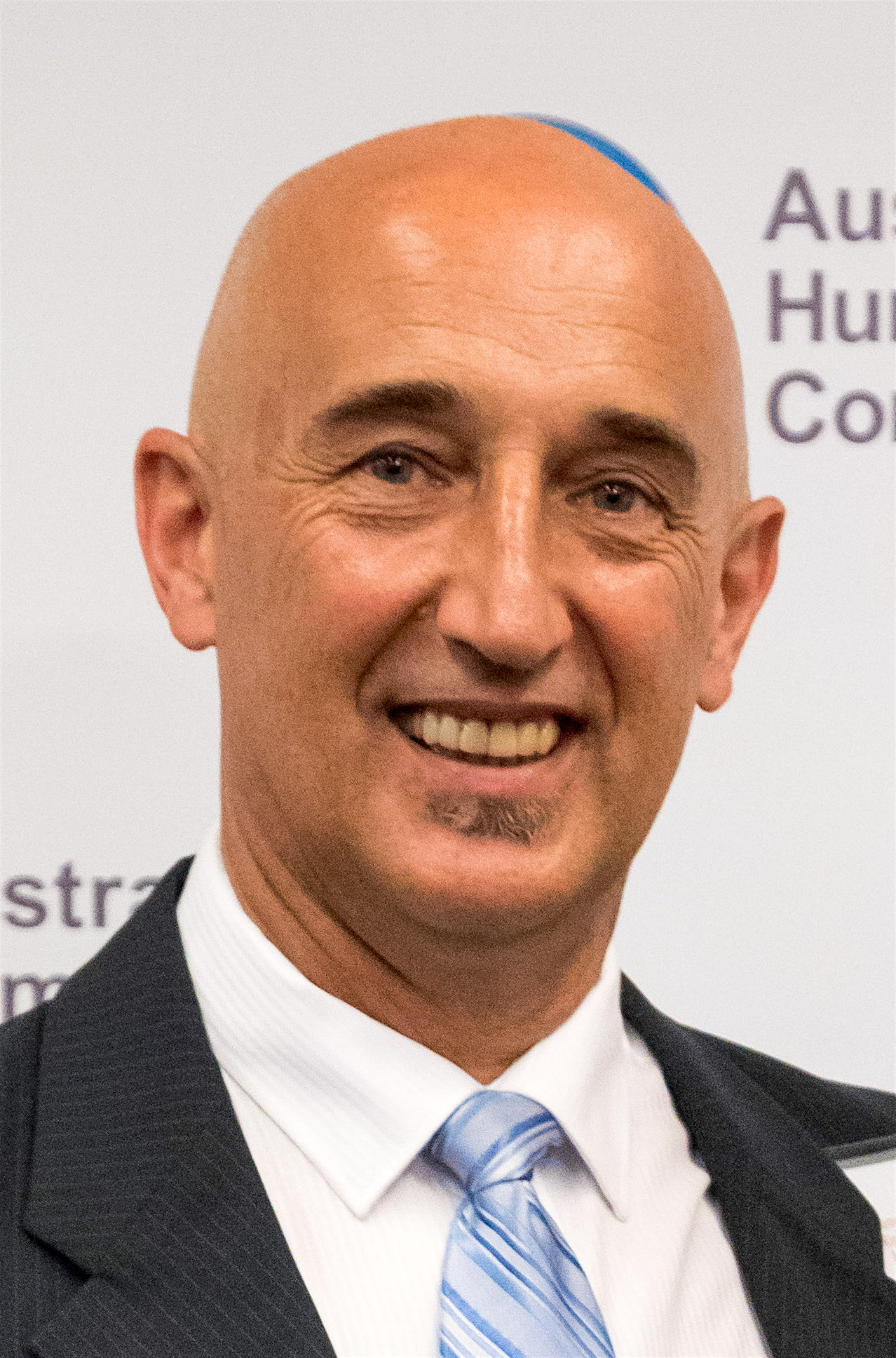
- Born: 29 April 1962 (age 64); Melbourne, Victoria, Australia
- Known for: Loss of family, and founder of The Alannah and Madeline Foundation
- Spouses: Nanette Moulton (d. 1996); Kim Sporton (m. 2000)
- Children: Alannah (1989–1996); Madeline (1993–1996); Isabella (b. 2001)

Walter Mikac AM (born 29 April 1962) is an Australian pharmacist who became widely known as a political activist in the aftermath of the Port Arthur massacre, where his wife Nanette Mikac (née Moulton) and daughters, six-year-old Alannah Mikac and three-year-old Madeline Mikac were among 35 people killed by Martin Bryant on 28 April 1996.

In the subsequent debate surrounding gun politics in Australia, Mikac became a prominent advocate for tightening gun laws.

Today, Mikac works as a motivational speaker and is the author of a book called To Have And To Hold. He has also written a book called The Circle of Life: Replacing Hardship with Love about dealing with grief and tragedy when it strikes. He was also a co-founder of The Alannah and Madeline Foundation, which was set up in their memory to provide support for children who are the victims of violent crime. Queen Mary of Denmark is the patron of the Foundation. In 2000, he married sports journalist Kim Sporton in a private ceremony and then in 2001 they had a daughter, Isabella. Mikac and Sporton are separated.

Mikac was made a Member of the Order of Australia (AM) in the 2018 Australia Day Honours "For significant service to the community as an advocate for gun control, and to the protection of children through social welfare programs."

At the 2018 Victorian State Election, Mikac unsuccessfully ran for the right wing populist and Australian nationalist party the Aussie Battler Party

== See also ==
- Rosie Batty – Australian domestic violence campaigner and 2015 Australian of the Year who lost her eleven-year-old son Luke in a murder-suicide in 2014.
- John Walsh – American television personality. He started America's Most Wanted following the murder of his six-year-old son Adam in 1981.
