= Rod Barton =

Australian politician

Rod Barton MLC

Member of the Victorian Legislative Council for Eastern Metropolitan Region
- In office 24 November 2018 – 26 November 2022
- Preceded by: Richard Dalla-Riva
- Succeeded by: Aiv Puglielli

Co-leader of the Transport Matters Party
- In office 2018 – 28 July 2023

Personal details
- Born: Rodney Brian Barton; 1958 (age 67–68) Melbourne, Australia
- Party: Independent (since 2023)
- Other political affiliations: Transport Matters Party (2018–2023)
- Occupation: Hire car operator
- Profession: Politician
- Website: https://rodbarton.com.au/

Rod Barton is an Australian politician. He is the co-founder of the Transport Matters Party and was a member of the Victorian Legislative Council, representing the Eastern Metropolitan Region. He was elected in November 2018, but was not re-elected at the 2022 election.

Barton established the Transport Matters Party in response to the deregulation of the taxi and hire car industry in 2017.

Before entering politics, Barton worked for 30 years in the taxi and hire-car industry.

Barton lives in Melbourne with his wife. He has two daughters and five grandchildren.

== Early life and career ==
Barton was born in 1958 in Footscray, Victoria. His parents arrived in Australia in 1951 via ship. At age 15, he left school and commenced working.

Barton began driving professionally approximately 30 years ago. Following in his family's footsteps, he started his working career by driving cabs, quickly moving into driving limousines as well.

In 1999, he started his own small business in the hire car industry in Victoria, Australia, which grew to have a solid client base across Melbourne over the next 20 years.

In 2017, the Victorian Government deregulated the taxi and hire car industry and revoked taxi and hire car licences. Together with like-minded colleagues, Barton reformed the Victorian Hire Car Association (VHCA) to become the Commercial Passenger Vehicle Association of Australia (CPVAA) now known as Transport Australia Alliance (TAA) in response to Professor Fels Industry Inquiry.

In 2018, with the loss of his business's viability and his family's property, Barton and his colleague, Andre Baruch, began the steps to form a political party to address the issues caused by the deregulation of the industry.

== Political career ==
In 2018, Barton was elected to the Legislative Council as the leading candidate for Transport Matters Party for the Eastern Metropolitan Region. Barton gave his maiden speech on 5 February 2019.

In September 2020 and in March 2021 Barton voted against The Public Health and Wellbeing Amendment (State of Emergency Extension and Other Matters) Bill 2020, rejecting "the time frame for the extensions to the state of emergency" and "the way the bill was drafted to deliver unfettered powers to the government without adequate checks and balances."

According to The Age, between November 2018 and November 2021, Barton voted with the Andrews Government's position 63.3% of the time, the third-most of any Legislative Council crossbencher, behind only Fiona Patten (74.3%) and Andy Meddick (83.2%).
