= Aussie Battler Party =

- Leader: Stuart O'Neil
- Founded: October 2018
- Dissolved: June 2019
- Ideology: Right-wing populism Australian nationalism
- Political position: Right-wing
- Colours: Blue

Website
- www.aussiebattlerparty.com.au

The Aussie Battler Party was a political party in Victoria, Australia, formed in October 2018, which contested the 2018 state election. It sought to "represent all of those who are fed up with so much wasting of taxpayers money and time by too many politicians who have forgotten what it is like to live in mainstream society"(sic). The party has been described as arch-conservative and called for a "10-year good behaviour bond" on new migrants and a ban on what they call "paedophile grooming content" in the anti-bullying Safe Schools program.

It fielded candidates in each of the eight regions of the Victorian Legislative Council and gained 0.9% of the vote. The party's policies included:

- Abolishing the anti-bullying program, Safe Schools (calling it "child abuse" and "pro-paedophilia and paedophile grooming content")
- Tackling rising prices by creating a government funded lending institution
- Moving people into regional areas.

One of their candidates was Walter Mikac who was one of the driving forces behind Australia's tougher gun laws, but the party did a number of preference deals with other parties supported by the gun lobby. It participated in preference harvesting deals organised by "preference whisperer" Glenn Druery.

After the 2018 Victorian State Election, all parties which did not receive a minimum of a 4% statewide vote were required by the Victorian Electoral Commission to undergo a membership check. The Battler Party failed that initial check and were then required to undergo a full membership audit. The party failed that as well and was formally de-registered by the Victorian Electoral Commission in 2019.
