= Electoral results for the Northern Metropolitan Region =

Electoral results in Victoria, Australia

This is a list of electoral results for the Northern Metropolitan Region in Victorian state elections from the region's creation in 2006 until the present.

== Election results ==
=== Elections in the 2020s ===
==== 2022 ====
Labor were defending two seats. The Liberal Party, Greens, and Reason were defending one seat each.

2022 Victorian state election: Northern Metropolitan
Party	Candidate	Votes	%	±%
Quota		75,406		
Labor	1. Sheena Watt (elected 1); 2. Enver Erdogan (elected 4); 3. Susie Byers; 4. Chloe Gaul; 5. Ramy Aljalil	151,062	33.39	−9.18
Liberal	1. Evan Mulholland (elected 2); 2. Owen Guest; 3. Tim Staker-Gunn; 4. Melinda Tempany; 5. Hafiz Qadeer	85,359	18.87	+2.41
Greens	1. Samantha Ratnam (elected 3); 2. Esther Kennedy; 3. Sarah Jefford; 4. Michael Leach; 5. Kenna Morrison	84,127	18.59	+1.86
Democratic Labour	1. Adem Somyurek (elected 5); 2. Cary De Wit	21,684	4.79	+0.62
Victorian Socialists	1. Jerome Small; 2. Cathy Lewis	21,305	4.71	+0.52
Reason	1. Fiona Patten; 2. Judy Ryan; 3. Jenn Clark; 4. Marcella Brassett; 5. Tali Siani Jagielski	16,322	3.61	+0.24
Legalise Cannabis	1. Andrew Hale; 2. Renee Thompson	13,822	3.06	+3.06
Family First	1. Imad Hirmiz; 2. Denise Lowry	11,646	2.57	+2.57
Animal Justice	1. Leah Horsfall; 2. Bruce Poon	6,320	1.40	−0.62
Liberal Democrats	1. Paul Silverberg; 2. Rachel Versteegen	5,612	1.24	−0.13
United Australia	1. Kelly Moran; 2. Scott McCamish	5,601	1.24	+1.24
Freedom	1. Damien Richardson; 2. Cameron Stoddart	4,937	1.09	+1.09
Justice	1. Simone Philpott-Smart; 2. Thomas Stanfield	4,773	1.05	−0.97
One Nation	1. Jessica Davis; 2. Matthew Considine	4,251	0.94	+0.94
Shooters, Fishers, Farmers	1. Ethan Constantinou; 2. Ben Podger	3,470	0.77	−0.43
Sack Dan Andrews	1. Hatice Yesilagac; 2. Berke Yolcu	2,711	0.60	+0.60
Transport Matters	1. Georgia Diamantopoulos; 2. Francesco Raco	1,964	0.43	−0.17
Health Australia	1. Lisa Taggart; 2. Gabrielle Brodie	1,642	0.36	−0.46
Companions and Pets	1. Pauline Grutzner; 2. Linda Pullen	1,582	0.35	+0.35
Sustainable Australia	1. Alison Pridham; 2. Daryl Budgeon	1,480	0.33	−0.38
New Democrats	1. Amita Ros; 2. Pushpinder Singh; 3. Vikram Bhinder	1,456	0.32	+0.32
Angry Victorians	1. Nickee Freeman; 2. Jake Cashion	1,186	0.26	+0.26
Ind. (Indigenous)	Colin John Mancell	118	0.03	+0.03
Total formal votes		452,430	96.33	+1.13
Informal votes		17,223	4.80	−1.13
Turnout		496,653	85.07	−2.94

=== Elections in the 2010s ===
==== 2018 ====
The Labor Party were defending two seats, while the Liberals, Greens and Sex Party (now Reason Party) were defending one each.

2018 Victorian state election: Northern Metropolitan
Party	Candidate	Votes	%	±%
Quota		75,040		
Labor	1. Jenny Mikakos (elected 1); 2. Nazih Elasmar (elected 2); 3. Burhan Yigit; 4. Ash Verma; 5. Karen Douglas	191,850	42.57	+2.18
Greens	1. Samantha Ratnam (elected 3); 2. Christina Zigouras; 3. Edward Crossland; 4. Josef Rafalowicz; 5. Campbell Gome	75,384	16.73	−1.83
Liberal	1. Craig Ondarchie (elected 4); 2. Evan Mulholland; 3. Neelam Rai; 4. Kate Drake; 5. Mark Polistena	74,179	16.46	−5.40
Victorian Socialists	1. Stephen Jolly; 2. Sue Bolton; 3. Colleen Bolger	18,899	4.19	+4.19
Democratic Labour	1. John McBride; 2. Jackie Gwynne	18,783	4.17	+1.23
Reason	1. Fiona Patten (elected 5); 2. Helena Melton; 3. Ange Hopkins; 4. Rachel Payne; 5. Dominique Musico	15,197	3.37	+0.50
Animal Justice	1. Bruce Poon; 2. Miranda Smith; 3. Chris Delforce	9,123	2.02	+0.51
Justice	1. Carmela Dagiandis; 2. Prudence Mercieca	9,112	2.02	+2.02
Liberal Democrats	1. Louise Hitchcock; 2. Richard Wright	6,185	1.37	−0.11
Shooters, Fishers, Farmers	1. Ethan Constantinou; 2. Chris Tzelepis	5,388	1.20	+0.11
Vote 1 Local Jobs	1. Nathan Purcell; 2. Aaron Purcell	5,351	1.19	+0.83
Aussie Battler	1. Walter Mikac; 2. David Graham	4,470	0.99	+0.99
Health Australia	1. Pippa Campbell; 2. Emily Oldmeadow	3,703	0.82	+0.82
Voluntary Euthanasia	1. Sandra McCarthy; 2. Stefan Nott	3,681	0.82	+0.52
Sustainable Australia	1. Mark McDonald; 2. William Clow	3,103	0.69	+0.69
Transport Matters	1. Moti Ram Visa; 2. Afshan Mian	2,682	0.60	+0.60
Liberty Alliance	1. Russell Gomez; 2. John Reisner	1,708	0.38	+0.38
Country	1. Cameron Stoddart; 2. Domenic Greco	1,604	0.36	+0.20
Hudson for Northern Victoria	1. Madison Wright; 2. Marylynn Meneghini	228	0.05	+0.05
Total formal votes		450,239	95.20	+0.47
Informal votes		22,717	4.80	−0.47
Turnout		472,956	88.01	−3.05

==== 2014 ====
2014 Victorian state election: Northern Metropolitan
Party	Candidate	Votes	%	±%
Quota		68,667		
Labor	1. Jenny Mikakos (elected 1); 2. Nazih Elasmar (elected 4); 3. Burhan Yigit; 4. Martin Appleby	166,412	40.39	−4.37
Liberal	1. Craig Ondarchie (elected 2); 2. Gladys Liu; 3. Amandeep Rosha; 4. David Mulholland; 5. Susan Turner	90,071	21.86	−2.77
Greens	1. Greg Barber (elected 3); 2. Alex Bhathal; 3. Alison Parkes; 4. Anthony Williams; 5. Gurm Sekhon	76,476	18.56	−0.17
Democratic Labour	1. Michael Murphy; 2. Mark Galvin	12,126	2.94	+0.00
Sex Party	1. Fiona Patten (elected 5); 2. Joel Murray	11,840	2.87	−0.98
Family First	1. Brendan Fenn; 2. Sarah Clark	7,968	1.93	−0.63
The Basics Rock 'n' Roll	1. Kris Schroeder; 2. Tim Heath	6,340	1.54	+1.54
Animal Justice	1. Bruce Poon; 2. Maria McLaverty	6,205	1.51	+1.51
Liberal Democrats	1. David Limbrick; 2. Erin Murphy	6,083	1.48	+1.48
Christians	1. Maria Bengtsson; 2. John Carter	5,670	1.38	+1.38
Palmer United	1. Maria Rigoni; 2. Mario Laing	4,899	1.19	+1.19
Shooters and Fishers	1. Christos Tzelepis; 2. Justin Rogan	4,476	1.09	+1.09
Cyclists	1. Nik Dow; 2. Geoff Cicuto	3,384	0.82	+0.82
Group N	1. Peter Allan; 2. Nicola Thomson; 3. Nicole Batch	1,988	0.48	+0.48
Voice for the West	1. Phil Cleary; 2. Emma Phillips	1,969	0.48	+0.48
Vote 1 Local Jobs	1. Nathan Purcell; 2. Aaron Purcell	1,487	0.36	+0.36
Rise Up Australia	1. Michael Mastrantuono; 2. Simon Hay	1,349	0.33	+0.33
Voluntary Euthanasia	1. Bertha Franklin; 2. Jay Franklin	1,226	0.30	+0.30
People Power Victoria	1. Marc Florio; 2. Sheriden Tate; 3. Anne Paten	1,157	0.28	+0.28
Country Alliance	1. Domenic Greco; 2. Evan Spanos	651	0.16	−0.34
Save The Planet	Tiffany Harrison	177	0.04	+0.04
Independent	Darren Bain	44	0.01	+0.01
Total formal votes		411,998	94.73	
Informal votes		22,932	5.27	
Turnout		434,930	91.06	

==== 2010 ====
2010 Victorian state election: Northern Metropolitan
Party	Candidate	Votes	%	±%
Quota		65,673		
Labor	1. Jenny Mikakos (elected 1); 2. Nazih Elasmar (elected 4); 3. Nathan Murphy; 4. Rhiannon Platt; 5. Peter Smythe	165,259	41.9	−7.1
Liberal	1. Matthew Guy (elected 2); 2. Craig Ondarchie (elected 5); 3. Sam Granleese; 4. Daniel Parsons; 5. Jemma Townson	106,905	27.1	+3.9
Greens	1. Greg Barber (elected 3); 2. Alexandra Bhathal; 3. Fraser Brindley; 4. Samantha Ratnam; 5. Alister Air	75,648	19.2	+2.1
Sex Party	1. Fiona Patten; 2. Douglas Leitch	14,290	3.6	+3.6
Democratic Labor	1. John Kavanagh; 2. Monica Thatcher; 3. Bridget Cashin; 4. Angela Anderson; 5. Michael Travers	10,655	2.7	−2.5
Family First	1. Andrew Conlon; 2. Peter Kerin; 3. Rod Dawson	9,132	2.3	−0.5
Group C	1. Stephen Mayne; 2. Paula Piccinini	3,862	1.0	+1.0
Christian Democrats	1. Vickie Janson; 2. Saleem Arthur	3,533	0.9	+0.9
Group A	1. Joanne Stuart; 2. April Lee	2,331	0.6	+0.6
Country Alliance	1. Kevin Archibald; 2. Chris Morris	2,072	0.5	+0.5
Independent	Adrian Whitehead	348	0.1	+0.1
Total formal votes		394,035	95.3	+1.0
Informal votes		19,235	4.7	−1.0
Turnout		413,270	91.4	+0.3

=== Elections in the 2000s ===
==== 2006 ====
2006 Victorian state election: Northern Metropolitan
Party	Candidate	Votes	%	±%
Quota		60,025		
Labor	1. Theo Theophanous (elected 1); 2. Jenny Mikakos (elected 3); 3. Nazih Elasmar (elected 5); 4. Michele Ryan; 5. Joe Caputo	176,303	49.0	−8.5
Liberal	1. Matthew Guy (elected 2); 2. Dino de Marchi; 3. Emilia Arnus	83,634	23.2	+0.5
Greens	1. Greg Barber (elected 4); 2. Priya Carey; 3. Hoa Pham; 4. Glenn Osboldstone; 5. Daniel Marti	61,465	17.1	+0.3
Democratic Labor	1. John Mulholland; 2. Kevin Harwood	18,581	5.2	+5.2
Family First	1. Liz Bos; 2. Amy Shand; 3. Giacomo Angeli; 4. Roy Crea	10,117	2.8	+2.8
Democrats	1. Geoff Lutz; 2. Jessica Healy; 3. Robert Stone	4,521	1.3	−1.5
People Power	1. Barbara Biggs; 2. Vern Hughes	3,894	1.1	+1.1
Group D	1. Joseph Kaliniy; 2. Koulla Mesaritis; 3. Alexios Alexopoulos; 4. Mousti Senkul	1,634	0.5	+0.5
Total formal votes		360,149	94.3	−1.4
Informal votes		21,730	5.7	+1.4
Turnout		381,879	91.1	
