= Electoral results for the Jika Jika Province =

Victoria, Australia, district election results

This is a list of electoral results for the Jika Jika Province in Victorian state elections.

== Members for Jika Jika Province ==
Member 1	Party	Year		
George Crawford	Labor	1985	Member 2	Party
George Crawford	Labor	1988	Theo Theophanous	Labor
Pat Power	Labor	1992	Theo Theophanous	Labor
Pat Power	Labor	1996	Theo Theophanous	Labor
Jenny Mikakos	Labor	1999	Theo Theophanous	Labor
Jenny Mikakos	Labor	2002	Theo Theophanous	Labor

== Election results ==
=== Elections in the 2000s ===
2002 Victorian state election: Jika Jika Province
Party	Candidate	Votes	%	±%
Labor	Theo Theophanous	78,149	59.9	−5.8
Liberal	Thomas Flitner	28,160	21.6	−12.5
Greens	Alexandra Bhathal	18,914	14.5	+14.5
Democrats	Jess Healy	5,261	4.0	+3.9
Total formal votes		130,484	95.7	−0.3
Informal votes		5,798	4.3	+0.3
Turnout		136,282	92.8	
Two-party-preferred result
Labor	Theo Theophanous	98,031	75.1	+9.2
Liberal	Thomas Flitner	32,424	24.9	−9.2
Labor hold		Swing	+9.2	

=== Elections in the 1990s ===
1999 Victorian state election: Jika Jika Province
Party	Candidate	Votes	%	±%
Labor	Jenny Mikakos	87,169	65.7	+10.5
Liberal	Allan Dunn	45,415	34.3	+0.3
Total formal votes		132,584	96.1	−0.3
Informal votes		5,390	3.9	+0.3
Turnout		137,974	93.4	
Labor hold		Swing	+2.9	

1996 Victorian state election: Jika Jika Province
Party	Candidate	Votes	%	±%
Labor	Theo Theophanous	70,387	55.3	−0.2
Liberal	George Prillwitz	43,170	33.9	−3.0
Democrats	Yanko Kalincev	9,137	7.2	+7.2
Democratic Labor	Bill Jansen	2,764	2.2	−5.4
Natural Law	Byron Rigby	1,834	1.4	+1.4
Total formal votes		127,292	96.4	+1.9
Informal votes		4,805	3.6	−1.9
Turnout		132,097	94.2	
Two-party-preferred result
Labor	Theo Theophanous	79,806	62.8	+1.5
Liberal	George Prillwitz	47,262	37.2	−1.5
Labor hold		Swing	+1.5	

1992 Victorian state election: Jika Jika Province
Party	Candidate	Votes	%	±%
Labor	Pat Power	66,472	55.5	−9.7
Liberal	Gregory Eade	44,217	36.9	+2.1
Democratic Labor	Leonard Moore	9,114	7.6	+7.6
Total formal votes		119,803	94.5	+1.2
Informal votes		7,008	5.5	−1.2
Turnout		126,811	94.7	
Two-party-preferred result
Labor	Pat Power	73,325	61.3	−3.9
Liberal	Gregory Eade	46,301	38.7	+3.9
Labor hold		Swing	−3.9	

=== Elections in the 1980s ===
1988 Victorian state election: Jika Jika Province
Party	Candidate	Votes	%	±%
Labor	Theo Theophanous	67,052	65.4	−2.5
Liberal	John Badham	35,467	34.6	+2.5
Total formal votes		102,519	93.1	−2.4
Informal votes		7,559	6.9	+2.4
Turnout		110,078	91.5	−1.0
Labor hold		Swing	−2.5	

1985 Victorian state election: Jika Jika Province
Party	Candidate	Votes	%	±%
Labor	George Crawford	73,242	67.9	
Liberal	David Gandolfo	34,690	32.1	
Total formal votes		107,932	95.5	
Informal votes		5,058	4.5	
Turnout		112,990	92.5	
Labor hold		Swing	−2.1	
