= Nathan Murphy =

Nathan Murphy may refer to:

- Nathan Oakes Murphy (1849–1908), governor of Arizona Territory
- Nathan Murphy (Australian politician) (born 1977), member of the Victorian Legislative Council in 2010
- Nathan Murphy (footballer) (born 1999), Australian rules footballer for Collingwood
