= Electoral results for the district of Eltham =

Victoria, Australia, district election results

This is a list of electoral results for the Electoral district of Eltham in Victorian state elections.

== Members for Eltham ==
Member	Party	Term
Wayne Phillips	Liberal	1992–2002
Steve Herbert	Labor	2002–2014
Vicki Ward	Labor	2014–present

== Election results ==
=== Elections in the 2020s ===
2022 Victorian state election: Eltham
Party	Candidate	Votes	%	±%
Labor	Vicki Ward	19,509	44.5	−5.3
Liberal	Jason McClintock	15,615	35.6	−1.2
Greens	Alex Grimes	5,897	13.5	+3.0
Family First	Hugh Stubley	1,118	2.5	+2.5
Animal Justice	Catriona Marshall	995	2.3	+2.3
Democratic Labour	Leila Karimi	710	1.6	−0.2
Total formal votes		43,844	96.7	+1.2
Informal votes		1,507	3.3	−1.2
Turnout		45,351	92.7	
Two-party-preferred result
Labor	Vicki Ward	25,870	59.0	−1.5
Liberal	Jason McClintock	17,974	41.0	+1.5
Labor hold		Swing	−1.5	

=== Elections in the 2010s ===
2018 Victorian state election: Eltham
Party	Candidate	Votes	%	±%
Labor	Vicki Ward	19,831	49.22	+8.63
Liberal	Nick McGowan	15,639	38.81	−5.13
Greens	Matthew Goodman	4,208	10.44	−0.96
Democratic Labour	Peter O'Brien	614	1.52	+1.52
Total formal votes		40,292	96.16	+0.45
Informal votes		1,610	3.84	−0.45
Turnout		41,902	93.49	−1.42
Two-party-preferred result
Labor	Vicki Ward	23,802	59.07	+6.38
Liberal	Nick McGowan	16,490	40.93	−6.38
Labor hold		Swing	+6.38	

2014 Victorian state election: Eltham
Party	Candidate	Votes	%	±%
Liberal	Steven Briffa	17,727	43.9	−0.9
Labor	Vicki Ward	16,374	40.6	+1.9
Greens	Liezl Shnookal	4,600	11.4	−1.5
Independent	Chris Byrne	555	1.4	+1.4
Family First	Janna Fenn	490	1.2	−0.7
Christians	Michael Janson	345	0.9	+0.9
Independent	Ryan Ebert	251	0.6	+0.6
Total formal votes		40,342	95.7	−0.2
Informal votes		1,808	4.3	+0.2
Turnout		42,150	94.9	+0.4
Two-party-preferred result
Labor	Vicki Ward	21,258	52.7	+1.9
Liberal	Steven Briffa	19,084	47.3	−1.9
Labor hold		Swing	+1.9	

2010 Victorian state election: Eltham
Party	Candidate	Votes	%	±%
Liberal	Andrew Hart	16,047	44.87	+5.68
Labor	Steve Herbert	13,792	38.57	−5.85
Greens	James Searle	4,747	13.27	−0.13
Family First	Shane Porter	619	1.73	−1.27
Democratic Labor	Trudi Aiashi	557	1.56	+1.56
Total formal votes		35,762	95.99	−0.72
Informal votes		1,494	4.01	+0.72
Turnout		37,256	94.58	−0.03
Two-party-preferred result
Labor	Steve Herbert	18,184	50.80	−5.68
Liberal	Andrew Hart	17,612	49.20	+5.68
Labor hold		Swing	−5.68	

=== Elections in the 2000s ===
2006 Victorian state election: Eltham
Party	Candidate	Votes	%	±%
Labor	Steve Herbert	15,541	44.42	−0.24
Liberal	Craig Ondarchie	13,712	39.19	−2.83
Greens	Damian Magner	4,689	13.40	+0.08
Family First	Shane Porter	1,048	3.00	+3.00
Total formal votes		34,990	96.71	−1.27
Informal votes		1,189	3.29	+1.27
Turnout		36,179	94.61	−0.36
Two-party-preferred result
Labor	Steve Herbert	19,788	56.41	+1.71
Liberal	Craig Ondarchie	15,289	43.59	−1.71
Labor hold		Swing	+1.71	

2002 Victorian state election: Eltham
Party	Candidate	Votes	%	±%
Labor	Steve Herbert	15,739	44.7	+6.0
Liberal	Wayne Phillips	14,810	42.0	−8.4
Greens	Merinda Gray	4,695	13.3	+10.3
Total formal votes		35,244	98.0	+0.4
Informal votes		728	2.0	−0.4
Turnout		35,972	95.0	
Two-party-preferred result
Labor	Steve Herbert	19,309	54.8	+8.5
Liberal	Wayne Phillips	15,935	45.2	−8.5
Labor gain from Liberal		Swing	+8.5	

=== Elections in the 1990s ===
1999 Victorian state election: Eltham
Party	Candidate	Votes	%	±%
Liberal	Wayne Phillips	18,696	50.3	−4.4
Labor	Pam Hanney	14,325	38.5	+0.2
Independent	Margaret Jennings	1,310	3.5	+3.5
Greens	Jeremy Whitehead	1,237	3.3	+3.3
Democrats	Sean Carter	966	2.6	+2.6
Independent	June English	546	1.5	+1.5
Natural Law	Wendy Rosenfeldt	98	0.3	−0.8
Total formal votes		37,178	97.6	−0.9
Informal votes		907	2.4	+0.9
Turnout		38,085	94.4	
Two-party-preferred result
Liberal	Wayne Phillips	19,960	53.5	−3.3
Labor	Pam Hanney	17,315	46.5	+3.3
Liberal hold		Swing	−3.3	

1996 Victorian state election: Eltham
Party	Candidate	Votes	%	±%
Liberal	Wayne Phillips	19,624	54.7	−2.3
Labor	Sigmund Jorgensen	13,744	38.3	+3.4
Independent	Gavin Gray	2,136	6.0	+6.0
Natural Law	Peter Jackson	389	1.1	−2.5
Total formal votes		35,893	98.6	+1.3
Informal votes		522	1.4	−1.3
Turnout		36,415	95.4	
Two-party-preferred result
Liberal	Wayne Phillips	20,328	56.8	−3.2
Labor	Sigmund Jorgensen	15,467	43.2	+3.2
Liberal hold		Swing	−3.2	

1992 Victorian state election: Eltham
Party	Candidate	Votes	%	±%
Liberal	Wayne Phillips	18,823	57.0	+11.9
Labor	Alan Baker	11,514	34.9	−19.0
Independent	Bob West	1,504	4.6	+4.6
Natural Law	Steve Davies	1,185	3.6	+3.6
Total formal votes		33,026	97.3	+0.2
Informal votes		915	2.7	−0.2
Turnout		33,941	96.2	
Two-party-preferred result
Liberal	Wayne Phillips	19,794	60.0	+14.6
Labor	Alan Baker	13,175	40.0	−14.6
Liberal gain from Labor		Swing	+14.6	
