= Pat Power (Victorian politician) =

Australian politician

Pat Power (29 March 1942 – 3 December 2009) was an Australian politician.

He was born in Cobden. In 1992 he was elected to the Victorian Legislative Council as a Labor member for Jika Jika. He was Shadow Minister for Regional Development (1992–93), Local Government and Regional Development (1993–97), Roads and Ports (1996–99), and Local Government (1997–99), and deputy leader of the Opposition in the upper house from February to September 1999, when he lost preselection to recontest his seat. He died in 2009.

Victorian Legislative Council
Preceded by George Crawford	Member for Jika Jika; 1992–1999; Served alongside: Theo Theophanous	Succeeded by Jenny Mikakos
