= George Crawford (Australian politician) =

Australian politician (1925–2012)

George Robert Crawford

Member of the Victorian Legislative Council for Jika Jika
- In office 1985–1992 Serving with Theo Theophanous
- Succeeded by: Pat Power

Personal details
- Born: George Crawford; 13 January 1926 Prahran, Victoria, Australia
- Died: 7 August 2012 (aged 86)
- Party: Labor Party

George Robert Crawford (13 January 1926 – 7 August 2012) was an Australian politician.

He was born in Prahran and was an official with the Plumbers and Gasfitters Employees Union of Australia, serving more than twenty years as general secretary and Victorian branch secretary. He joined the Labor Party in 1944 and sat on the State Executive from 1960 to 1975 and in 1979. From 1965 to 1969 he was state vice-president, rising to president from 1969 to 1973 and from 1983 to 1985. In 1985 he was elected to the Victorian Legislative Council as a member for Jika Jika, serving until his retirement in 1992. Crawford died in 2012.

Victorian Legislative Council
New seat	Member for Jika Jika; 1985–1992; Served alongside: Theo Theophanous	Succeeded by Pat Power
