= Nathan Murphy (Australian politician) =

Australian politician

Member of the Victorian Legislative Council for Northern Metropolitan Region
- In office 9 March 2010 – 26 November 2010
- Premier: John Brumby
- Preceded by: Theo Theophanous
- Succeeded by: Craig Ondarchie

Personal details
- Born: 18 August 1977 (age 49) Melbourne, Victoria
- Party: Australian Labor Party
- Education: La Trobe University

Nathan Murphy (born 18 August 1977) is an Australian politician. On 9 March 2010, he was appointed to the Victorian Legislative Council as a Labor member for Northern Metropolitan Region to replace Theo Theophanous, who retired.

Murphy was born in Melbourne, Victoria, and received his VCE from Parade College in Bundoora. He later qualified for a Bachelor of Arts at La Trobe University. In 2000 he was National Welfare Officer for the National Union of Students as a member of the Australian Labor Students, and in 2001 became an electorate officer for federal Labor MP Lindsay Tanner, transferring to Senator Gavin Marshall in 2002. In 2004 he became a state organiser with the Victorian Labor Party, and in 2007 moved to the Plumbing Trades Employees Union as a community organiser, a position he held until his appointment to the Legislative Council in 2010.

Murphy was involved in the controversial round of ALP preselections in 2006 in Victoria, where he challenged sitting member and future Speaker of the House Harry Jenkins for the safe Labor Division of Scullin. One journalist wrote that "the choice of Murphy was so wrong-headed that even some of the Labor Unity people who negotiated the deal were embarrassed by it."

In the lead up to the 2010 Victorian Election, Murphy held a $500 a head fundraiser at a Melbourne apartment. The event gained media attention when the apartment was subsequently found decrepit and soiled. Murphy lost his Legislative Council position at the election.

After his time in parliament, Murphy returned to the union movement, and was working for the Health Services Union in 2013.
