= Reason Party (Australia) =

Reason Australia
- Leader: Fiona Patten
- Founded: 22 August 2017
- Dissolved: 7 March 2024
- Preceded by: Australian Sex Party; Australian Cyclists Party; Voluntary Euthanasia Party (NSW)
- Ideology: Civil libertarianism Progressivism; Secular liberalism Drug liberalisation
- Political position: Centre to centre-left
- Colours: Teal

Website
- reason.org.au

Reason Australia, commonly referred to as the Reason Party or as simply Reason, was an Australian political party. Its leader, Fiona Patten, described the party as a "civil libertarian alternative". Patten was elected to the Victorian Legislative Council at the 2018 state election in the Northern Metropolitan Region, after formerly being elected as an Australian Sex Party member for the same seat in 2014. However, she lost re-election in 2022.

Reason was registered at the state level in Victoria and New South Wales, as well as with the Australian Electoral Commission at the federal level. The party was disbanded in March 2024. Patten subsequently joined Legalise Cannabis Australia.

== History ==
In August 2017, Fiona Patten announced the launch of a new political party called Reason Australia, in part born from a merger of the Australian Sex Party and the Australian Cyclists Party. In January 2018, the Victorian Electoral Commission officially changed the party's name from "Australian Sex Party – Victoria" to "Reason Victoria".

In May 2018, the party applied to the AEC for registration for federal elections as "Reason Australia", which was approved on 30 August 2018.

In December 2019, the NSW branch of the Voluntary Euthanasia Party merged with the Reason Party, and changed its name to "Reason Party NSW".

In December 2020 it was announced that Patten would enter a coalition with independent Mildura MP, Ali Cupper who sits in the Legislative Assembly. Cupper ended the agreement on 13 May 2021.

In February 2022, Jane Caro announced that she was standing as a candidate for the party for a New South Wales Australian Senate seat in the 2022 Australian federal election. She was unsuccessful.

Patten was not re-elected at the 2022 Victorian state election, leaving Reason with no elected representatives.

== Parliamentary actions ==
The party's main goal should they be elected was to establish voluntary assisted dying laws for Victoria. After a long process and a marathon legislative session, the bill became law on a conscience vote.

In 2017, Patten renewed calls for a pilot program of a safe injecting room in North Richmond, in response to a large increase of Victorian drug-related deaths in the last several years. In the first session for the Legislative Council of the year, she introduced the Drugs, Poisons and Controlled Substances Amendment (Pilot Medically Supervised Injecting Centre) Bill 2017. At the time there were regular overdoses in the streets of Richmond, and that number has been reduced significantly since the centre was opened, with various estimates about the number of lives saved due to the opening of the centre.

== Policies ==
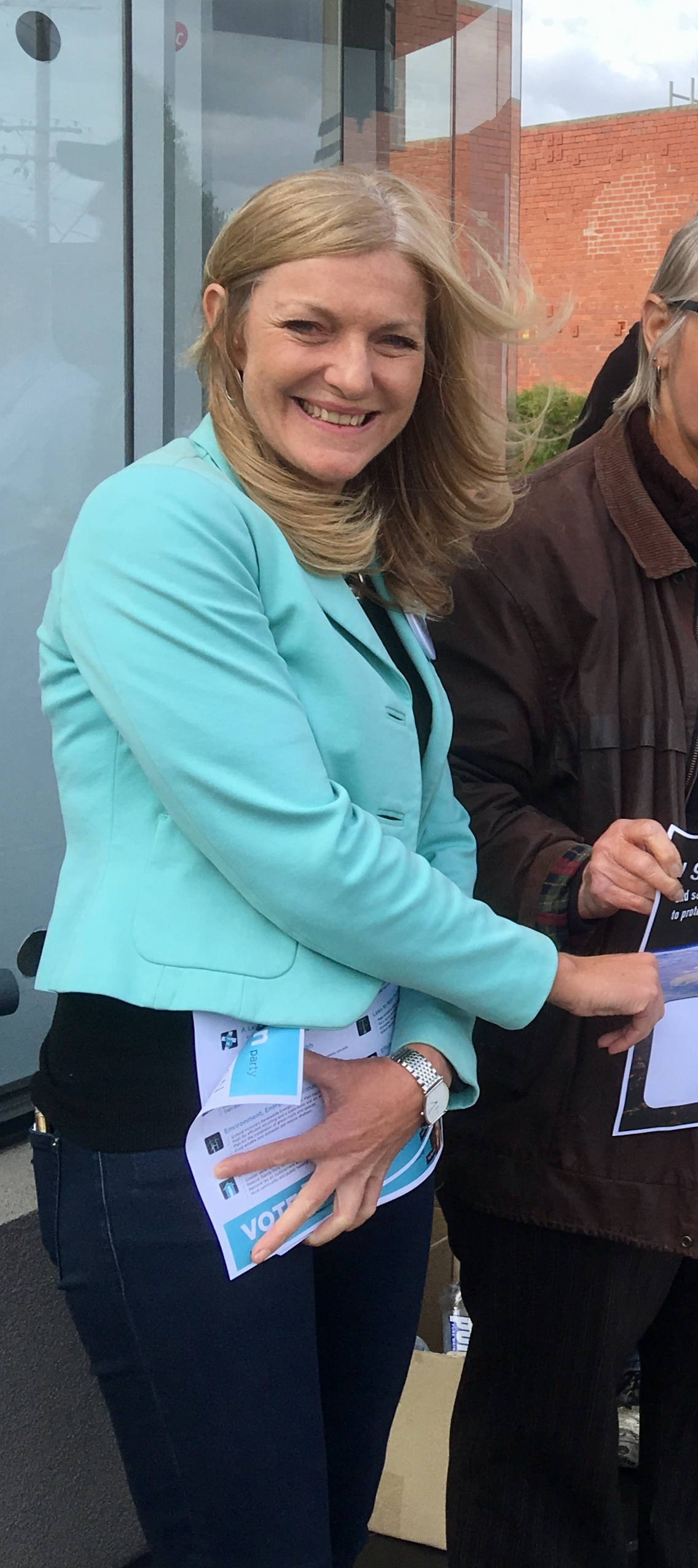
Party leader Fiona Patten in November 2018

The party's policies included:

=== Drug law reform ===
- Drug use to be treated as a health issue, not a criminal one
- Cannabis to be legalised, regulated and taxed
- Trial hydromorphone (analogue of heroin) on prescription
- Increase in medically supervised injecting centres
- Electronic vaporisers and liquid nicotine should be legalised
- Pill testing at every music festival

==== Cannabis ====
In regards to cannabis the party supports the following:

- The legalisation and regulation of cannabis for people over the age of 18
- Support for the legal possession and use of cannabis for people over the age of 18
- Amending drug driving laws to test for impairment not presence
- The cultivation of a defined number of plants in their principal place of residence
- Regulations that allow for the establishment of cannabis social clubs
- Establishing a regulatory body to oversee the industry
- Regulation on the potency of THC in legal cannabis products
- Market controls to avoid the creation of a ‘Big Cannabis’ industry
- Restrictions on advertising, marketing and promotion products
- Competitive pricing to undercut the illicit market
- An appropriate tax framework to help fund cannabis related programs
- Expunging all historical personal-use cannabis criminal records

=== Tax and churches ===
- Remove tax exemptions from businesses owned by religious institutions, while protecting their charitable activities
- Prevent religious organisations from discriminating by reforming anti-discrimination laws
- Religious oaths to be removed from parliamentary proceedings
- Extend mandatory reporting laws to religious institutions and end exemptions for admissions disclosed in religious confessions

=== Social housing ===
- Encourage build-to-rent and rent-to-buy schemes and remove tax barriers
- Stamp Duty to be reduced from investments in social housing

=== Gambling ===
- Setting a maximum bet limit for poker machines and limiting the influence of the pokies industry

=== Health ===
- Vaccination to protect public health and reduce the spread of preventable diseases
- Establishment of health hubs
- Early intervention and evidence-based prevention are the main focus
- Create an ombudsman for aged care and retirement housing, and establish a statewide ageing strategy

=== Internet and media ===
- Expand free wifi in public spaces including on all public transport
- Anti-ISP filtering
- National media classification and introduction of non-violent sexual content label

=== Other areas ===
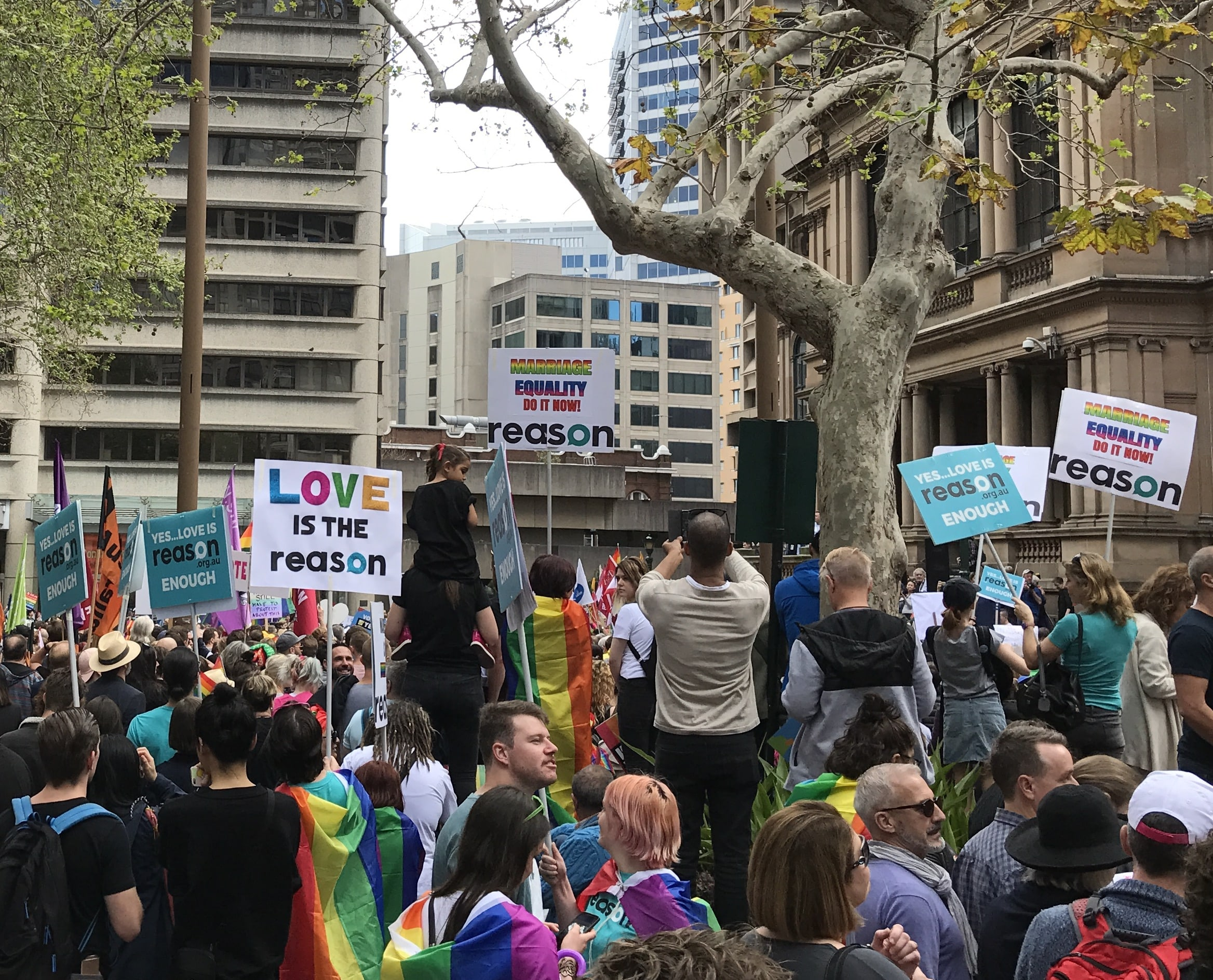
Reason Party supporters with placards at Yes Marriage Equality rally Sydney Town Hall 10 Sept 2017

- Focusing on community housing and ensuring that at-risk people have a place to live
- Decriminalise sex work and remove censorship so that people can make their own choices about what they want to watch
- Improving public transport especially for high growth outer suburban areas
- Increasing oversight around politicians and tighten the rules to prevent unethical behaviour by the state's politicians and public figures
- Taxing the non-charitable business arms of religious institutions. This includes the estimated $9 billion portfolio of the Catholic Church in the state
- Holding a referendum on whether or not Australia should become a republic
- A nationwide trial of a four-day workweek
- Provide improved, interconnected and safer walking and cycling paths, including:
  - Investment in safe, direct and continuous bike routes, separated from other forms of traffic
  - Revitalisation and expansion of existing cycling trails
  - Providing bike racks on buses, trams and trains
- Optional bike helmet laws
- The right for terminally ill people to choose voluntary assisted dying
  - Repealing laws that prevent the territories from enacting voluntary assisted dying legislation
  - Promote and support legalisation of voluntary assisted dying in every state and territory of Australia

== Electoral history ==
=== Victorian state elections ===
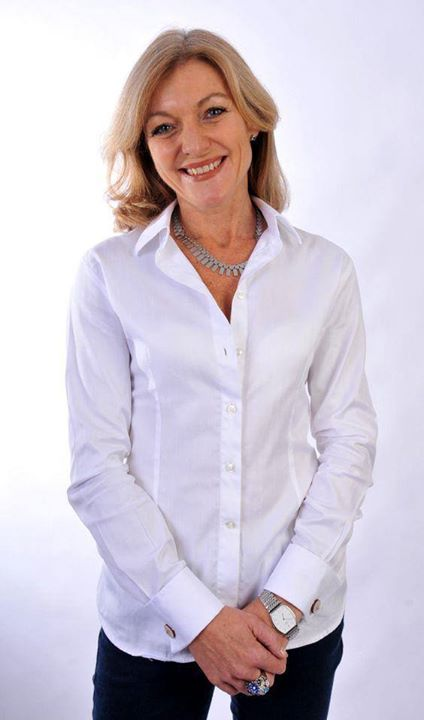
Fiona Patten Portrait 2013

In addition to fielding candidates in a number of Victorian Legislative Assembly seats, the party stood candidates in all regions of the Victorian Legislative Council after 2017. In 2018 the party succeeded in re-electing Fiona Patten to the Northern Metropolitan Region.

Election	Eastern Victoria	North-Eastern Metro	Northern Metro	Northern Victoria	South-Eastern Metro	Southern Metro	Western Metro	Western Victoria	# of seats won
2018	0.81%	1.18%	3.37%	0.70%	0.85%	2.00%	1.15%	0.92%	1 / 40
2022	0.74%	0.99%	3.61%	0.81%	0.45%	2.02%	0.81%	0.71%	0 / 40

Victorian Legislative Council
Election year	No of votes	% of vote	Seats won	+/–	Notes
2018	49,013	1.37 (#9)	1 / 40	▲1	Shared balance of power
2022	46,685	1.26 (#13)	0 / 40	▼1	

==== Victorian state by-elections ====
Election	Candidate	Vote share	Year
Northcote*	Laura Chipp	3.20%	2017

*Chipp was endorsed by the party, but the party was not registered with the VEC at the time, as they were in the process of changing their name.

== Links ==
The party has had some involvement in Glenn Druery's Minor Party Alliance. However, in the lead-up to the 2018 state election, Fiona Patten had a falling out with Glenn Druery due to his new conflict of interest as chief-of-staff to Federal Senator, Derryn Hinch, who was running candidates in the election and receiving favourable preferences due to Druery's private business dealings as the "preference whisperer". She claimed that he demanded that the Reason Party pay him money, or she would not be re-elected. Patten made an official complaint to the VEC, and Druery is now subject to an ongoing police investigation over this complaint.

== See also ==
- Rachel Payne
- Fusion Party (Australia)
- Public Education Party
