= Jika Jika Province =

Former electoral province of the Victorian Legislative Council, Australia

Jika Jika Victoria—Legislative Council
- State: Victoria
- Created: 1985
- Abolished: 2006
- Area: 108 km^{2} (41.7 sq mi)
- Demographic: Metropolitan
- Coordinates: 37°43′S 145°00′E

Jika Jika Province was an electorate of the Victorian Legislative Council in Victoria, Australia. It existed as a two-member electorate from 1985 to 2006, with members holding alternating eight-year terms. It was a safe seat for the Labor Party throughout its existence. It was abolished from the 2006 state election in the wake of the Bracks Labor government's reform of the Legislative Council.

It was located in the northern suburbs of Melbourne. In 2002, when it was last contested, it covered an area of 108 km^{2} and included the suburbs of Bundoora, Fairfield, Greensborough, Mill Park, Northcote, Preston, Reservoir, South Morang and Thornbury.

== Members for Jika Jika Province ==
Member 1	Party	Year		
George Crawford	Labor	1985	Member 2	Party
George Crawford	Labor	1988	Theo Theophanous	Labor
Pat Power	Labor	1992	Theo Theophanous	Labor
Pat Power	Labor	1996	Theo Theophanous	Labor
Jenny Mikakos	Labor	1999	Theo Theophanous	Labor
Jenny Mikakos	Labor	2002	Theo Theophanous	Labor

== Election results ==
2002 Victorian state election: Jika Jika Province
Party	Candidate	Votes	%	±%
Labor	Theo Theophanous	78,149	59.9	−5.8
Liberal	Thomas Flitner	28,160	21.6	−12.5
Greens	Alexandra Bhathal	18,914	14.5	+14.5
Democrats	Jess Healy	5,261	4.0	+3.9
Total formal votes		130,484	95.7	−0.3
Informal votes		5,798	4.3	+0.3
Turnout		136,282	92.8	
Two-party-preferred result
Labor	Theo Theophanous	98,031	75.1	+9.2
Liberal	Thomas Flitner	32,424	24.9	−9.2
Labor hold		Swing	+9.2	
