= Sheena Watt =

Australian politician

Sheena Watt MLC
- Watt at the 2024 St John's Annual Ambulance Awards

Member of the Victorian Legislative Council for Northern Metropolitan Region
- Incumbent
- Assumed office 13 October 2020
- Preceded by: Jenny Mikakos

Personal details
- Born: 1983 or 1984 (age 42–43) Melbourne, Victoria, Australia
- Party: Labor Party
- Website: https://sheenawatt.com.au/

Sheena Watt is an Australian politician, who has been a member of the Victorian Legislative Council for Northern Metropolitan Region since 13 October 2020. A Yorta Yorta woman, she is the first Indigenous Australian woman to represent the Australian Labor Party in the Parliament of Victoria. She previously held the roles of Parliamentary Secretary for Housing since June 2022, Parliamentary Secretary for Volunteers since December 2022, Parliamentary Secretary for Climate Action since October 2023, and Parliamentary Secretary for Emergency Services since May 2024.

Before entering Parliament, Watt was active in the union movement. In her inaugural speech, she acknowledged the United Workers Union, the Australian Services Union, and the Australian Council of Trade Unions for their role in advancing workers’ rights and helping to develop her skills as an advocate.

Watt also held executive roles such as Executive Manager at AFL SportsReady, developing employment and training pathways for young people. She held numerous roles and board positions in community and health advocacy organisations, including the Stroke Foundation, Victorian Health Promotion Foundation, Victorian Council of Social Service, Women’s Health Victoria, and Merri Health.

During the 2023 referendum Watt campaigned for a "Yes" vote, having fought for formal recognition of Indigenous peoples for much of her career. Watt has been a vocal supporter of Victoria’s Treaty process, highlighting truth-telling and self-determination, and describing the opening of treaty negotiations as “a decisive step toward justice, recognition and reconciliation."

Watt is currently the Parliamentary Secretary for Public and Active Transport and Parliamentary Secretary for Community Sports since April 2026.

Watt is a member of the Labor Left faction of the Labor Party.
