= Nazih Elasmar =

Australian politician (born 1953)

Nazih Elasmar OAM MLC

President of the Victorian Legislative Council
- In office 18 June 2020 – 20 December 2022
- Deputy: Wendy Lovell
- Preceded by: Shaun Leane

Member of the Victorian Legislative Council for Northern Metropolitan Region
- In office 25 November 2006 – 26 November 2022
- Constituency: Northern Metropolitan Region

Personal details
- Born: 16 April 1953 (age 72) Beirut, Lebanon
- Party: Labor
- Occupation: Teacher; Electorate Officer; Politician

Nazih Halim Elasmar OAM (Arabic: نزيه حليم الأسمر; born 16 April 1953), is a Lebanese-Australian former politician. He was a member of the Victorian Legislative Council for the Labor Party between 2006 and 2022.

In 2006 Victorian state elections, Elasmar was elected to the Northern Metropolitan Region. He was previously the mayor of the City of Darebin in 1997.

In June 2020, Elasmar was elected as the President of the Victorian Legislative Council, succeeding Shaun Leane who was appointed to cabinet. In October 2021, Elasmar was accused in the Independent Broad-based Anti-corruption Commission (IBAC) hearings for branch stacking and paying for people's memberships, which is not allowed in the Labor Party. In December, during preselection, Elasmar was moved down into unwinnable positions on the Legislative Council ballot for the November 2022 election. He subsequently chose not to contest the election and gave his valedictory statement on 21 September 2022.

Elasmar was born in Lebanon and came to Australia at the age of 20. He is married with three children.

Victorian Legislative Council
Preceded by Shaun Leane	President of the Victorian Legislative Council; 2020–2022	Succeeded by Shaun Leane
