= Fiona Patten =

Australian politician (born 1964)

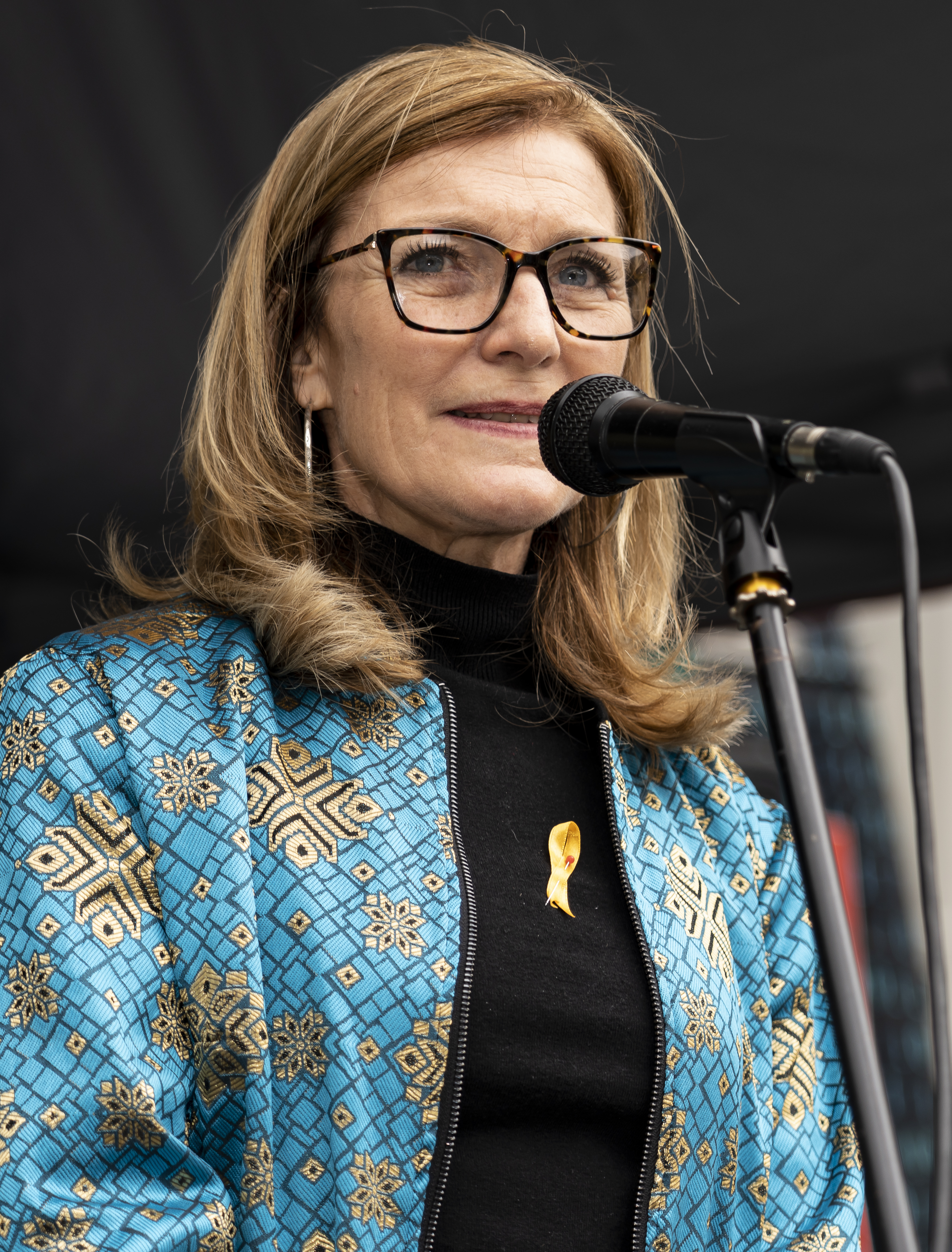
- Patten in 2022

Leader of Reason Australia (Note: formerly the Australian Sex Party)
- In office (as Reason Party); 29 January 2018 – 7 March 2024
- Preceded by: Herself (as Leader of the Australian Sex Party)
- In office (as Australian Sex Party); 5 December 2009 – 24 November 2017
- Preceded by: Party established
- Succeeded by: Herself (as Leader of the Australian Reason Party)

Member of the Victorian Legislative Council for Northern Metropolitan
- In office 29 November 2014 – 26 November 2022
- Preceded by: Matthew Guy

President of the Eros Association
- In office 21 November 1992 – 23 November 2014
- Preceded by: Organisation established
- Succeeded by: David Watt

Director of the National Museum of Erotica
- Incumbent
- Assumed office 1 March 2001
- Preceded by: Institution established

Personal details
- Born: Fiona Heather Patten; May 1964 (age 62) Canberra, Australian Capital Territory, Australia
- Party: Legalise Cannabis (since 2024)
- Other political affiliations: Hare-Clark Independent (1991–1992); Independent (1992–2009); Reason Australia (2009–2024)
- Education: Hawker College
- Alma mater: University of Canberra
- Occupation: Chief executive officer (Eros Association); Fashion designer (Body Politics)
- Profession: Lobbyist; Businesswoman; Politician; Former sex worker
- Website: Official website

Fiona Heather Patten (born May 1964) is an Australian politician. She was the leader of Reason Australia (also known as the Reason Party) and was a member of the Victorian Legislative Council between 2014 and 2022, representing the Northern Metropolitan Region, until she lost her seat at the 2022 state election.

Patten established the Australian Sex Party in 2009 to focus on personal freedoms after deep frustration with stagnation on censorship, freedom, marriage equality and drug law reform. On 22 August 2017, it was announced that the Australian Sex Party would be changing its name to the Reason Party.

Before entering politics, Patten was the CEO of Australia's national adult industry association, Eros Association. She championed sexual rights and health movements for more than 20 years, particularly on HIV/AIDS, after initially starting out as a small business owner with her own fashion label.

During her time as a Victorian MP, Patten has been credited for playing pivotal roles in achieving social reforms in Victoria, with examples including the passage of Victoria's assisted dying legislation, the trial of a medically supervised drug injecting room in Richmond, relaxing laws for ride-share companies such as Uber and establishing buffer zones for abortion clinics to keep protesters away from patients and staff.

According to The Age, between November 2018 and November 2021, Patten voted with the Andrews Government's position 74.3% of the time, the second-most of any Legislative Council crossbencher, behind only Andy Meddick of the Animal Justice Party. In March 2024, Patten announced that she was deregistering Reason Australia. In August 2024, it was announced that Fiona Patten will be the lead Senate candidate of Legalise Cannabis Australia (also known as the Legalise Cannabis Party) in Victoria at the 2025 Australian Senate election. She was unsuccessful.

== Early life and career ==
Patten was born in Canberra, Australian Capital Territory, the daughter of Colin Richard Lloyd "Rick" Patten, an Australian naval officer, and his wife Anne, a Scottish-born public servant who worked for a government-owned telecommunications company.

Rick and Anne Patten had met in Scotland, where the former had been posted, and after her birth Patten spent parts of her childhood in the United Kingdom and the United States, in concert with her father's postings. Patten has a younger sister and a younger brother.

Patten received her primary education overseas. She excelled in sport and took particular interest in swimming. Upon returning to Australia with her family in 1978, Patten attended Hawker College in Canberra where she studied Mathematics, Physics, Chemistry, Industrial Arts, Technical Drawing, Landscape Design and Environmental Studies. She went on to study Landscape Architecture and Industrial Design at the University of Canberra. She later graduated with qualifications in fashion design and started her own fashion label, Body Politics. The first boutique was opened in Yarralumla in the late 1980s, where she sold her own fashion creations as well as the designs of colleagues in Sydney. During the early 1990s recession in Australia, interest in Patten's expensive collection was received largely from workers in the sex industry.

== Business career (1988–2014) ==
=== Body Politics ===
Patten started her career with her company Body Politics. With her large clientele of sex workers, Patten became interested in sex workers' rights, eventually joining Workers in Sex Employment (WISE), a lobbying group, to inform at-risk members of the population about the emerging threat of HIV/AIDS. Patten was employed as an outreach speaker and would once a week visit brothels to teach the women about safe sex.

From 1990 to 1992, Patten was a sex worker herself. Her initial encounter began at Tiffany's Palace in Canberra, where she had intercourse with a client when another worker was unavailable.

I remember it all very clearly and thinking afterwards: how easy was that? It was just so easy. There was this nice man in his early 30s, we had a spa and sex and that was that – Fiona Patten, article by Sally Patten for the Australian Financial Review, December 2014

Patten eventually lost interest in her work, which had also interfered with her social and professional life. After working as a female escort in Cairns, Queensland, Patten quit sex work in 1992 and continued in sex education.

=== Eros Association ===
In 1992, Patten and her partner, Robbie Swan, established the Eros Association, a peak body for the adult industry.

The company extended its interests into publications, public relations, business, and political advocacy. Eros was heavily involved in the editing and publication of a political humour and satire magazine entitled Matilda, an adult magazine entitled Ecstacy, and launched their own "sex and politics" themed magazine Eros.

The Eros Association was instrumental in support for the Brindabella Wilderness Project, an initiative to preserve wildlife in the Brindabella Valley and Mountains.

In 2001, the company established the first National Museum of Erotica, dedicated to the history of erotica and the preservation of erotic art, literature, film and photography. The museum was unveiled by Chief Minister Kate Carnell. While the physical presence of the museum was closed in 2002, the collection remained preserved and continued to grow, with over 400 individual pieces catalogued by 2005, and instead maintained a virtual presence on the internet.

Patten scaled down her interests in the company in 2000 to pursue other interests in advocacy. She returned in 2006 and left again in 2014 when she was elected to the Victorian Parliament.

=== National Museum of Erotica ===
The National Museum of Erotica was opened in Canberra in 2001, dedicated to the history of erotica and the preservation of erotic art, literature, film and photography. The museum was unveiled by Chief Minister Kate Carnell and was the first establishment of its kind in Australia.

The National Museum of Erotica collected works from the likes of Brett Whiteley, Charles Blackman, Salvatore Zofrea, Lesbia Thorpe, Richard Larter, Mario Azzopardi, and more historically Mihály Zichy. Patten expressed that the collection and archiving of erotic, pornographic and sexual art and artefacts is fundamentally different from the collection of non-sexual material because the former was perceived as a rapidly diminishing resource in the world.

The museum housed erotic artistic works, including paintings, pictures, pin-up, illustrated books, comic strips and films, from the United States, the United Kingdom, Japan, Hungary, Russia and Australia.

The museum also displayed a collection of sex toys, including dildos, vibrators and other mechanical devices dating back to the late 1800s.

The museum was closed in 2002, but the collection remained preserved and continued to grow, with over 400 individual pieces catalogued by 2005. The museum now maintains an internet archive.

== Political career (1992–2024) ==
Patten first sought election in the 1992 Australian Capital Territory election. Patten contested the second election for representation in the multi-member single constituency Australian Capital Territory Legislative Assembly as part of the Hare-Clark Independent Party. Patten ran alongside the sitting member Craig Duby, however both Duby and Patten were unsuccessful in being elected.

=== Australian Sex Party (2009–2017) ===
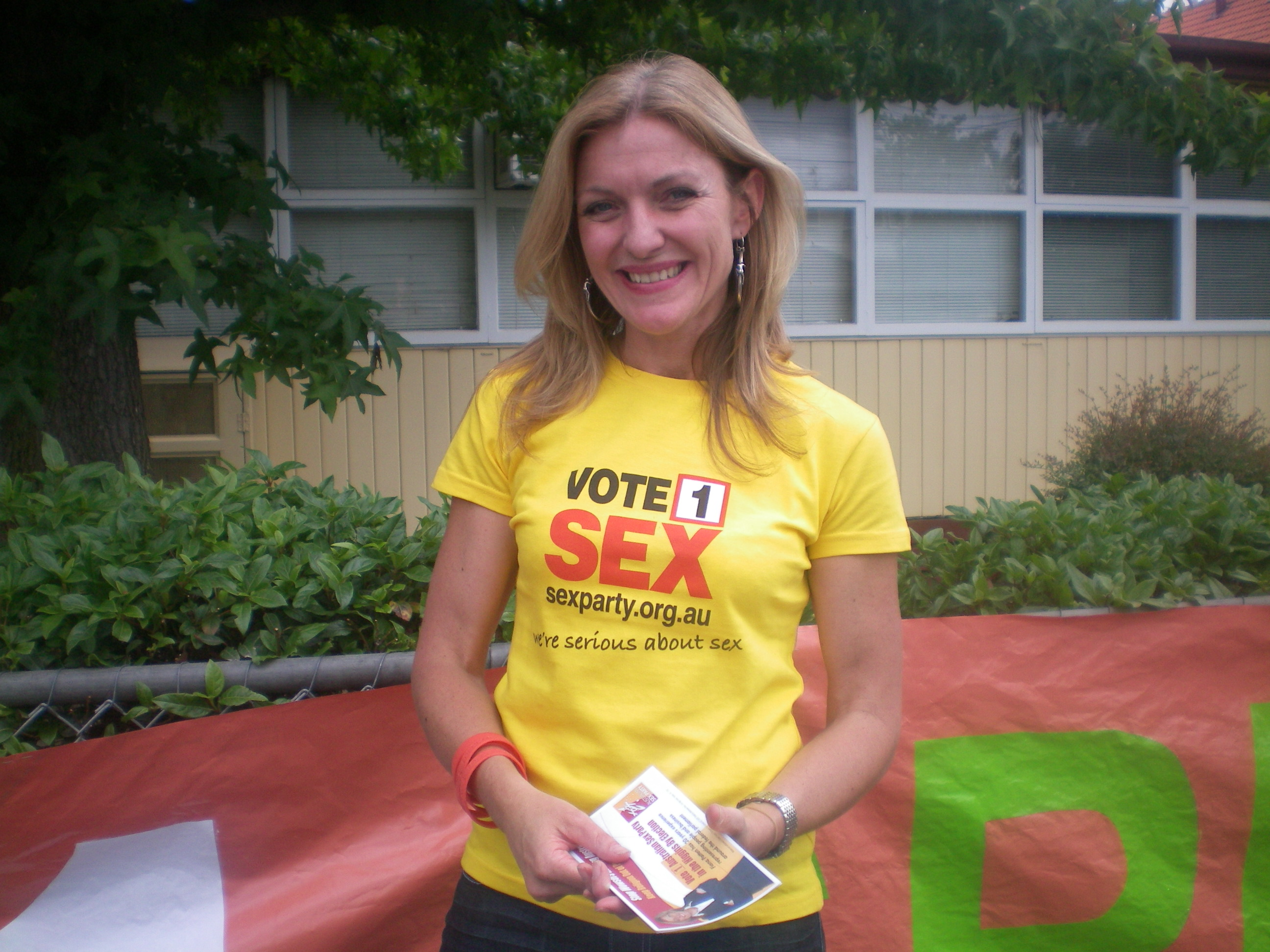
Patten in 2009

In 2009, Patten founded the Australian Sex Party, which began by focusing on law reform for the sex industry, but soon "broadened [its] platform to include supporting voluntary euthanasia, same-sex marriage, decriminalising cannabis for personal use, greater transparency in government through freedom of information laws, and increasing people’s right to privacy." Patten later advocated for legalising cannabis rather than decriminalisation.

Patten contested the seat of Higgins in Victoria at the 2009 by-election. She received over three per cent of the vote, placing her fourth out of ten candidates. Her campaign was based on opposing Greens Victoria candidate Clive Hamilton's proposal for an ISP-level Internet filter which would block access to websites containing RC-rated content—that is, legal material which is banned from sale, trade or public exhibition due to its extreme nature.

Patten publicly criticised the proposal. She appeared in the Four Corners episode "Access Denied" arguing that it would include blocking access to adult films such as Pirates—refused classification because of a technicality—that do not depict sexual violence, are extremely popular overseas and are available for download on dozens of websites.

The party contested all states and territories, except for Tasmania and the Australian Capital Territory, in the Senate and six of 150 House of Representatives seats at the 2010 federal election. The party won 2.04 per cent of the national Senate vote, over 250,000 first preferences. After the major parties and the Greens, the Sex Party during the vote count were "neck and neck" with the Family First Party for the fourth place in the national Senate vote. The party "outpolled several more prominent minor parties and came within about 10,000 votes of Family First for the Senate in Victoria". After the party's first federal election contest, Patten claimed that the Sex Party was "now the major minor party in Australian politics":

We've polled better than the Greens did in their first federal election and believe that our vision of Australia as the most socially progressive country in the world is equal to the Greens environmental messages of 20 years ago.

While the Sex Party did not win any seats, their preferences were substantially beneficial to the Greens who won a Senate seat in every state for the first time.

Patten contested the Northern Metropolitan Region in the Victorian Legislative Council at the 2010 Victorian state election.

Patten contested the 2012 Melbourne state by-election, coming third out of 16 candidates, receiving 6.6 per cent of the vote, in the absence of a Liberal Party candidate. She says the party preferenced Labor ahead of the Greens due to the "anti-sex feminist movement" within the Greens, but that future preferences may change again.

Patten was again a Sex Party candidate for a senate seat in Victoria at the 2013 federal election.

Patten successfully contested the Northern Metropolitan Region in the Victorian Legislative Council during the 2014 Victorian state election becoming the first candidate for the Australian Sex Party to be elected to parliament.

=== Reason Party (2017–2024) ===
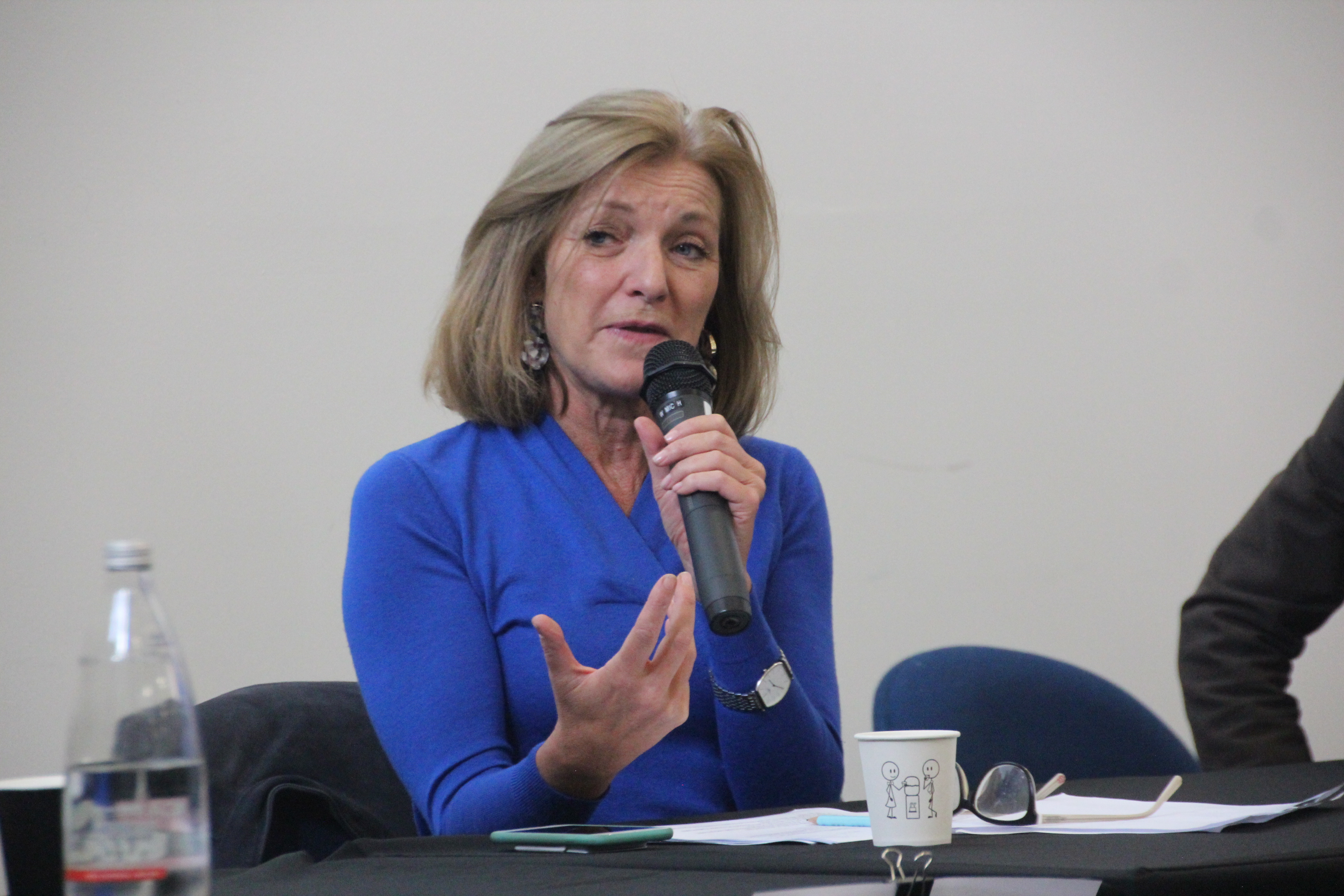
Fiona Patten in 2019

On 22 August 2017, there were reports that the Australian Sex Party would be changing its name and becoming the Reason Party. This was later confirmed, and the Reason Party registered for federal elections in Australia in May 2018, and was confirmed as "Reason Australia" on 30 August 2018.

In December 2018, Patten put forward a legislative bill to legalise cannabis in the state of Victoria.

In February 2022, the state of Victoria decriminalised sex work. The bill passed to repeal offences and criminal penalties for consensual sex work between adults. Patten has been referenced as having led Victoria's review into decriminalising the industry and been fighting for reforms for 40 years.

In February 2022, Patten introduced a bill to the Victorian upper house to decriminalise all drugs. Under the proposal police would issue a compulsory notice and referral of drug education or treatment to people found to have used or possessed an illicit drug. Those who comply with the notice will not be found guilty or receive a criminal record. "Patrick Lawrence, chief executive of addiction, mental health and legal services hub First Step, said the bill would ensure those struggling with addiction, who were often targeted by Victoria's drug laws, received help rather than condemnation."

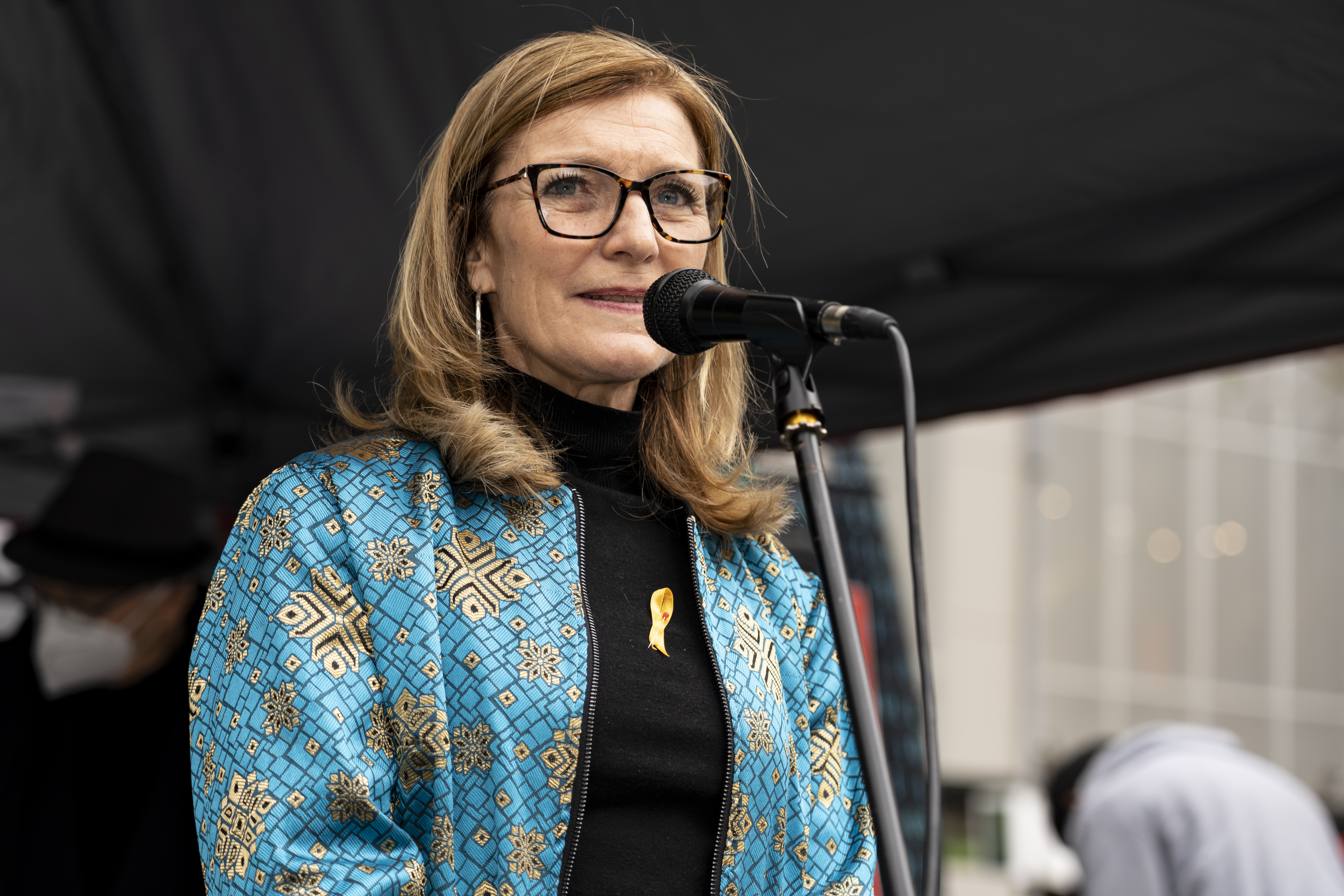
Patten at a Melbourne rally for International Peace Day in September 2022, calling for an end to militarisation and for Julian Assange's freedom

On 20 September 2022, she revealed that she has cancer.

At the 2022 Victorian state election, Patten was unsuccessful in her re-election to the Victorian Legislative Council.

In March 2024, Patten announced that Reason was to be dissolved and that she had no plans for a political comeback in the 2026 Victorian state election.

=== Legalise Cannabis Party (2024–present) ===
In August 2024, it was announced that Fiona Patten was the lead Senate candidate of Legalise Cannabis Australia (also known as the Legalise Cannabis Party) in Victoria for the 2025 Australian Senate election.

== Book ==
Patten's book Sex, Drugs and the Electoral Roll was published in 2018. It took her two years to write.

== Bibliography ==
- Sex, Drugs and the Electoral Roll: My unlikely journey from sex worker to Member of Parliament (Crows Nest: Allen & Unwin, ISBN 9781925575132, published in 2018)

== Awards ==
Patten was awarded the 2020 for her achievements in leading debate and securing legislation on many issues of concern to humanists, particularly end of life, abortion safety, sexual health and drugs of addiction.
