= Northern Metropolitan Region =

Electoral region in Victoria, Australia

Northern Metropolitan Region Victoria—Legislative Council
- Interactive map of electoral region boundaries from the 2022 state election, along with its composition of electoral districts
- State: Victoria
- Created: 2006
- MP: Enver Erdogan (Labor); Evan Mulholland (Liberal); Anasina Gray-Barberio (Greens); Adem Somyurek (Independent); Sheena Watt (Labor)
- Party: Labor (2); Greens (1); Liberal (1); Independent (1)
- Electors: 552,071 (2022)
- Area: 603 km^{2} (232.8 sq mi)
- Demographic: Metropolitan
- Coordinates: 37°40′S 144°58′E

Northern Metropolitan Region is one of the eight electoral regions of Victoria, Australia, which elects five members to the Victorian Legislative Council (also referred to as the upper house) by proportional representation. The region was created in 2006 following the 2005 reform of the Victorian Legislative Council.

The region comprises the Legislative Assembly districts of Broadmeadows, Brunswick, Essendon, Greenvale, Kalkallo, Melbourne, Northcote, Pascoe Vale, Preston, Richmond and Thomastown.

== Members ==
Members for Northern Metropolitan Region
Year	Member	Party	Member	Party	Member	Party	Member	Party	Member	Party
2006	Greg Barber	Greens	Nazih Elasmar	Labor	Jenny Mikakos	Labor	Theo Theophanous	Labor	Matthew Guy	Liberal
2010	Greg Barber	Greens	Nazih Elasmar	Labor	Jenny Mikakos	Labor	Nathan Murphy	Labor	Matthew Guy	Liberal
2010	Greg Barber	Greens	Nazih Elasmar	Labor	Jenny Mikakos	Labor	Craig Ondarchie	Liberal	Matthew Guy	Liberal
2014	Greg Barber	Greens	Nazih Elasmar	Labor	Jenny Mikakos	Labor	Craig Ondarchie	Liberal	Fiona Patten	Sex Party
2017	Samantha Ratnam	Greens	Nazih Elasmar	Labor	Jenny Mikakos	Labor	Craig Ondarchie	Liberal	Fiona Patten	Sex Party
2018	Samantha Ratnam	Greens	Nazih Elasmar	Labor	Jenny Mikakos	Labor	Craig Ondarchie	Liberal	Fiona Patten	Reason
2018	Samantha Ratnam	Greens	Nazih Elasmar	Labor	Jenny Mikakos	Labor	Craig Ondarchie	Liberal	Fiona Patten	Reason
2020	Samantha Ratnam	Greens	Nazih Elasmar	Labor	Sheena Watt	Labor	Craig Ondarchie	Liberal	Fiona Patten	Reason
2022	Samantha Ratnam	Greens	Enver Erdogan	Labor	Sheena Watt	Labor	Evan Mulholland	Liberal	Adem Somyurek	Democratic Labour
2024	Anasina Gray-Barberio	Greens	Enver Erdogan	Labor	Sheena Watt	Labor	Evan Mulholland	Liberal	Adem Somyurek	Independent

== Returned MLCs by seat ==
Seats are allocated by single transferable vote using group voting tickets. Changes in party membership between elections have been omitted for simplicity.

Election	1st MLC	2nd MLC	3rd MLC	4th MLC	5th MLC
2006	Labor (Theo Theophanous)	Liberal (Matthew Guy)	Labor (Jenny Mikakos)	Greens (Greg Barber)	Labor (Nazih Elasmar)
2010	Labor (Jenny Mikakos)	Liberal (Matthew Guy)	Greens (Greg Barber)	Labor (Nazih Elasmar)	Liberal (Craig Ondarchie)
2014	Labor (Jenny Mikakos)	Liberal (Craig Ondarchie)	Greens (Greg Barber)	Labor (Nazih Elasmar)	Sex Party (Fiona Patten)
2018	Labor (Jenny Mikakos)	Labor (Nazih Elasmar)	Greens (Samantha Ratnam)	Liberal (Craig Ondarchie)	Reason (Fiona Patten)
2022	Labor (Sheena Watt)	Liberal (Evan Mulholland)	Greens (Samantha Ratnam)	Labor (Enver Erdogan)	Democratic Labour (Adem Somyurek)

== Election results ==
Labor were defending two seats. The Liberal Party, Greens, and Reason were defending one seat each.

2022 Victorian state election: Northern Metropolitan
Party	Candidate	Votes	%	±%
Quota		75,406		
Labor	1. Sheena Watt (elected 1); 2. Enver Erdogan (elected 4); 3. Susie Byers; 4. Chloe Gaul; 5. Ramy Aljalil	151,062	33.39	−9.18
Liberal	1. Evan Mulholland (elected 2); 2. Owen Guest; 3. Tim Staker-Gunn; 4. Melinda Tempany; 5. Hafiz Qadeer	85,359	18.87	+2.41
Greens	1. Samantha Ratnam (elected 3); 2. Esther Kennedy; 3. Sarah Jefford; 4. Michael Leach; 5. Kenna Morrison	84,127	18.59	+1.86
Democratic Labour	1. Adem Somyurek (elected 5); 2. Cary De Wit	21,684	4.79	+0.62
Victorian Socialists	1. Jerome Small; 2. Cathy Lewis	21,305	4.71	+0.52
Reason	1. Fiona Patten; 2. Judy Ryan; 3. Jenn Clark; 4. Marcella Brassett; 5. Tali Siani Jagielski	16,322	3.61	+0.24
Legalise Cannabis	1. Andrew Hale; 2. Renee Thompson	13,822	3.06	+3.06
Family First	1. Imad Hirmiz; 2. Denise Lowry	11,646	2.57	+2.57
Animal Justice	1. Leah Horsfall; 2. Bruce Poon	6,320	1.40	−0.62
Liberal Democrats	1. Paul Silverberg; 2. Rachel Versteegen	5,612	1.24	−0.13
United Australia	1. Kelly Moran; 2. Scott McCamish	5,601	1.24	+1.24
Freedom	1. Damien Richardson; 2. Cameron Stoddart	4,937	1.09	+1.09
Justice	1. Simone Philpott-Smart; 2. Thomas Stanfield	4,773	1.05	−0.97
One Nation	1. Jessica Davis; 2. Matthew Considine	4,251	0.94	+0.94
Shooters, Fishers, Farmers	1. Ethan Constantinou; 2. Ben Podger	3,470	0.77	−0.43
Sack Dan Andrews	1. Hatice Yesilagac; 2. Berke Yolcu	2,711	0.60	+0.60
Transport Matters	1. Georgia Diamantopoulos; 2. Francesco Raco	1,964	0.43	−0.17
Health Australia	1. Lisa Taggart; 2. Gabrielle Brodie	1,642	0.36	−0.46
Companions and Pets	1. Pauline Grutzner; 2. Linda Pullen	1,582	0.35	+0.35
Sustainable Australia	1. Alison Pridham; 2. Daryl Budgeon	1,480	0.33	−0.38
New Democrats	1. Amita Ros; 2. Pushpinder Singh; 3. Vikram Bhinder	1,456	0.32	+0.32
Angry Victorians	1. Nickee Freeman; 2. Jake Cashion	1,186	0.26	+0.26
Ind. (Indigenous)	Colin John Mancell	118	0.03	+0.03
Total formal votes		452,430	96.33	+1.13
Informal votes		17,223	4.80	−1.13
Turnout		496,653	85.07	−2.94
