= Australian Sex Party =

Political party in Australia

- Leader: Fiona Patten
- Founded: 2009
- Dissolved: 22 August 2017
- Merged into: Reason Party
- Headquarters: 10 Ipswich St; Fyshwick ACT 2609
- Think tank: Eros Association
- Ideology: Sex positivity Civil libertarianism Progressivism; Secular liberalism
- Political position: Centre-left
- Colours: Yellow Red
- Victorian Legislative Council: 1 / 40 (2014−2017)

The Australian Sex Party was an Australian political party founded in 2009 in response to concerns over the purported increasing influence of religion in Australian politics. The party was born out of an adult-industry lobby group, the Eros Association. Its leader, Fiona Patten, was formerly the association's CEO.

Patten described the party as a "civil libertarian alternative". Patten is a veteran campaigner on issues such as censorship, equality, and discrimination. Patten was elected to the Victorian Legislative Council at the 2014 state election.

The party was briefly federally deregistered by the Australian Electoral Commission (AEC) on 5 May 2015, after an audit found that it could not demonstrate that it met the statutory requirement of 500 members but was re-registered in July.

The Sex Party was registered at state level in Victoria, where it had parliamentary representation, as well as in the Australian Capital Territory and Northern Territory. In 2017, the party merged with the Australian Cyclists Party to form Reason Australia.

== Policies ==
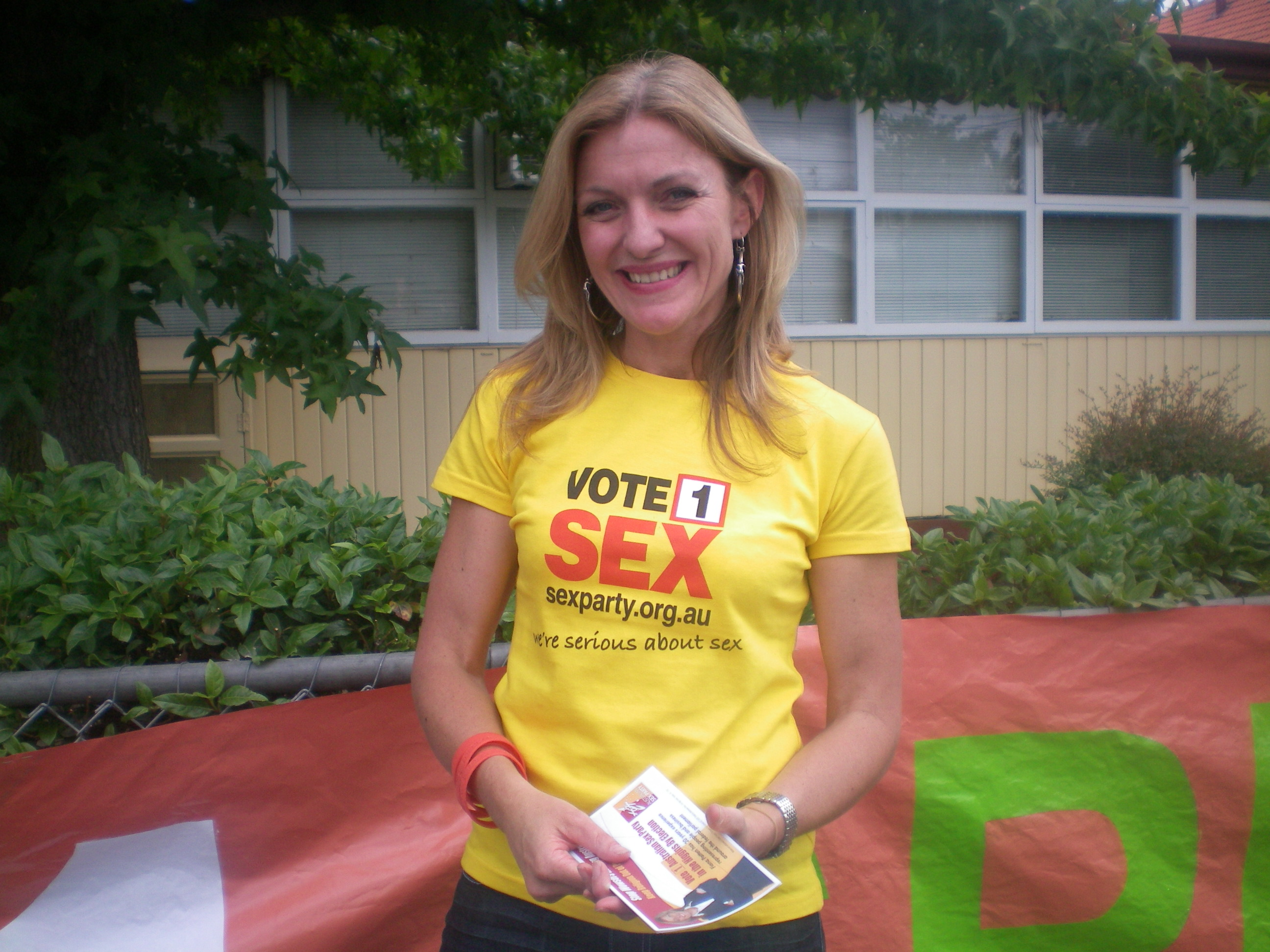
Party leader Fiona Patten

The Australian Sex Party's policy platform has been described as libertarian and supporting equality, social justice, civil liberties and freedom of choice. It is opposed to mandatory internet censorship and supports the introduction of a national media classification scheme, including a rating for non-violent sexual content.

The ASP also supports a Royal Commission into the sexual abuse of children in Australian religious institutions, and is in favour of legalised abortion, gay rights, voluntary euthanasia, the legalisation of cannabis for recreational use along with the decriminalisation of all other drugs for recreational use.

However, although this said decriminalisation, or more specifically the removal of criminal sanction, is of interest to the party, they do recommend that this is dealt with by referring one found with illicit drugs to a corresponding treatment centre. Additionally, the party is also in favour of sexual rights for disabled individuals. Based on the science, the Sex Party supports vaccination to protect public health and reduce the spread of preventable diseases. In a 2016 response to the Australian Vaccination-Skeptics Network's Meryl Dorey, the Sex Party stated: "Choosing not to vaccinate your children amounts to medical neglect; this is a serious ethical issue".

== Election results ==
=== 2009 federal by-elections ===
The party contested elections for the first time at the Higgins and Bradfield by-elections in November 2009, gaining over three percent of the primary vote in both seats, coming fourth of ten, and third of twenty-two candidates, respectively.

=== 2010 federal election ===
The party contested six of 150 House of Representatives seats and all states and territories (except Tasmania and the Australian Capital Territory) in the Senate at the 2010 federal election. Receiving more than 250,000 first preferences, the party won 2.04 percent of the national Senate vote. After the major parties and the Australian Greens, the Sex Party during the vote count were "neck and neck" with the Family First Party for the fourth place in the national Senate vote. The party "outpolled several more prominent minor parties and came within about 10,000 votes of Family First for the Senate in Victoria". After the party's first federal election contest, Patten claimed that the Sex Party was "now the major minor party in Australian politics":

We’ve polled better than the Greens did in their first federal election and believe that our vision of Australia as the most socially progressive country in the world is equal to the Greens environmental messages of 20 years ago.

Whilst the Sex Party did not win any seats, their preferences were substantially beneficial to the Greens who won a Senate seat in every state for the first time.

=== 2016 Federal election ===
For the 2016 federal election the Australian Sex Party fielded Senate candidates in every state and territory as well as two candidates in New South Wales and four in Victoria for seats in the House of Representatives. In several states, the Sex Party only fielded one senate candidate, teamed up with the Marijuana (HEMP) Party to share a column on the ballot paper.

=== 2016 Australian Capital Territory election ===
The Australian Sex Party ACT contested the 2016 Australian Capital Territory election, with lead candidate Steven Bailey receiving 7.9% of the primary vote in the Brindabella electorate.

=== Victorian state elections ===
In addition to fielding candidates in a number of Victorian Legislative Assembly seats, the party stood candidates in all regions of the Victorian Legislative Council after their initial election in 2010. In 2014 the party succeeded in having its first candidate elected to the council with the election of Fiona Patten in the Northern Metropolitan Region. She was returned in 2018.

Election	Eastern Metro	Eastern Victoria	Northern Metro	Northern Victoria	Southern Metro	South Eastern Metro	Western Metro	Western Victoria	Number of seats won
2010	-	-	3.60%	3.80%	3.20%	-	4.70%	-	0 / 40
2014	2.05%	2.49%	2.87%	3.27%	2.43%	2.67%	2.70%	2.50%	1 / 40

==== Victorian state by-elections ====
Election	Candidate	Vote share	Year
Broadmeadows	Merinda Davis	5.00%	2011
Niddrie	Amy Myers	8.10%	2012
Melbourne	Fiona Patten	6.56%	2012
Lyndhurst	Martin Leahy	8.40%	2013
Polwarth	Meredith Doig	6.00%	2015

=== Other statewide elections ===
==== Northern Territory ====
The party stood candidates in 5 electorates for the Northern Territory elections, 2012

Fong Lim	Johnston	Nightcliff	Port Darwin	Sanderson
3.00%	4.20%	1.90%	5.10%	4%

==== Australian Capital Territory ====
The party stood candidates in 3 regions at the ACT elections, 2016

Election	Brindabella	Murrumbidgee	Yerrabi
2016	7.90%	3.50%	4.00%

== Parliamentary actions ==
In 2015, Patten put forth a Private Member's Bill calling for a 150-metre (490 ft) "Safe Access Zone" around hospitals, GP clinics and health services that perform abortions, where it will be an offence to engage in behaviour that harasses or intimidates women seeking to access an abortion. The Public Health and Wellbeing Amendment (Safe Access Zone) Bill 2015 formally passed the Victorian Legislative Council without amendment.

Patten introduced another Private Member's Bill in 2016, calling for the regulation of ride-sharing apps such as Uber. The Ridesharing Bill 2016 gained support from both the Daniel Andrews Labor government and the opposition led by Matthew Guy.

In 2016, the Sex Party renewed its call for religious institutions to pay more state-based taxes, and to overturn long-standing exemptions.

== Links with other groups ==
The Australian Sex Party's close links with the adult industry lobby group, the Eros Association, led some people to see the party as its political wing.

The party had some involvement in the preferencing deals organised by Glenn Druery's Minor Party Alliance.
