= Craig Ondarchie =

Australian politician

Craig Ondarchie MLC
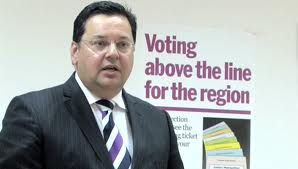

Member of the Victorian Legislative Council for the Northern Metropolitan Region
- In office 27 November 2010 – 26 November 2022

Personal details
- Born: 28 June 1962 (age 64)
- Party: Liberal Party
- Website: Craig Ondarchie

Craig Philip Ondarchie (born 28 June 1962) is an Australian former politician. He was a member of the Victorian Legislative Council between 2010 and 2022, representing the Northern Metropolitan Region. He attended Kingswood College in Box Hill and has been a member of the Liberal Party since 1997.

Ondarchie worked for over a decade in business development, two years as executive director of the Royal Women's Hospital, and eight years as managing partner of the Melbourne corporate governance organisation, RADNO.

== Political career ==
He was elected to the Northern Metropolitan Region at the 2010 Victorian Election, and currently sits on parliamentary committees overseeing environment and planning legislation, public accounts and estimates, and environment and planning references. On 25 April 2013, Ondarchie was appointed as Parliamentary Secretary to the Premier of Victoria.

After the 2014 Victorian state election, Ondarchie became a member of the Opposition front bench, serving as Shadow Minister for Investment and Jobs, and Shadow Minister for Trade. He was the centre of a controversy in 2018, during debate in the Legislative Council on a bill that would have, among other things, given presumptive rights to fire-fighters who had contracted cancer as part of their work. Ondarchie was granted a pair, so that he would not have to attend the Council on Good Friday, saying: "I do not want to be here. Today I want to be right now with my church family". However, Ondarchie did attend Parliament on Good Friday and voted against the bill, resulting in its defeat, and delaying the granting of presumptive rights to fire-fighters with cancer.

Ondarchie failed to gain a quota in his own right at the 2018 Victorian state election, but was re-elected with the help of preferences.

In November 2021, Ondarchie caused controversy when he claimed that people who had bought gallows to the steps of the Parliament of Victoria and called for the Premier Daniel Andrews to be hanged were "wonderful Victorians".

Ondarchie lost preselection for the Liberal Party's Northern Metro region ticket ahead of the 2022 Victorian state election.
