= Jenny Mikakos =

Australian politician

The Honourable Jenny Mikakos
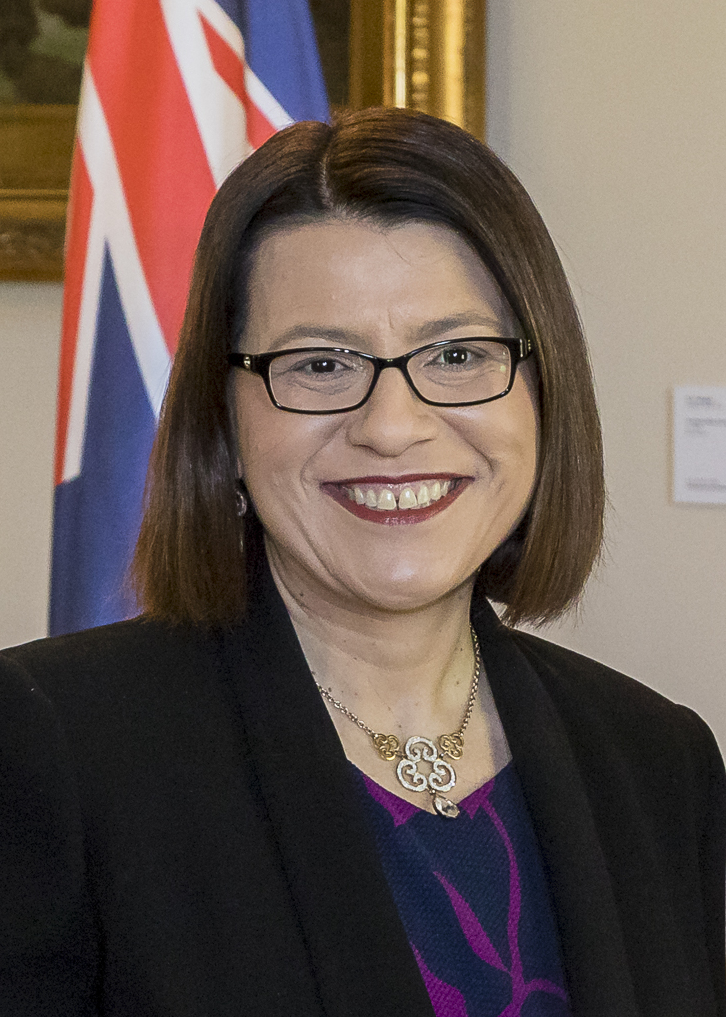
- Mikakos in 2018

Minister for Health Minister for Ambulance Services
- In office 29 November 2018 – 26 September 2020
- Premier: Daniel Andrews
- Preceded by: Jill Hennessy
- Succeeded by: Martin Foley

Member of the Victorian Legislative Council for Jika Jika Province
- In office 18 September 1999 – November 2006

Member of the Victorian Legislative Council for Northern Metropolitan Region
- In office November 2006 – 26 September 2020
- Succeeded by: Sheena Watt

Personal details
- Born: 25 January 1969 (age 57) Melbourne, Victoria, Australia
- Party: Labor Party
- Education: University of Melbourne
- Profession: Tax lawyer

Jenny Mikakos (born 25 January 1969) is a former Australian politician for the Labor Party who was a Member of the Legislative Council of Victoria from 1999 to 2020. She served as the Minister for Health, Minister for Ambulance Services and Minister for the Coordination of Health and Human Services COVID-19 as well as Deputy Leader of the Government, but resigned these positions and from parliament on 26 September 2020 in the wake of criticism of her role in hotel quarantine during the COVID-19 pandemic.

== Political career ==
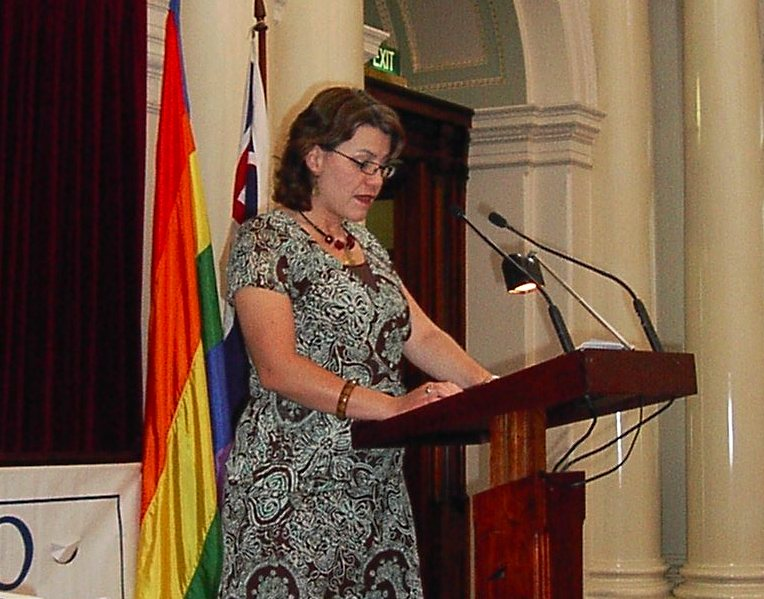
Mikakos in 2006

Mikakos was elected to Northcote City Council in 1993, serving briefly until the Kennett government dismissed all councils in 1994. She was first elected to parliament as the Member for Jika Jika Province in the State of Victoria in September 1999. From 1999 until 2006, she represented the Legislative Council province of Jika Jika. Mikakos' electorate was abolished at the 2006 election as part of major reforms of the Legislative Council introduced after the 2002 election, but she won the second position on the Labor ticket for the replacement electorate, the larger, five-member Northern Metropolitan Region. She was first on the Labor ticket at the 2010, 2014 and 2018 elections.

In Parliament, Mikakos held the roles of Parliamentary Secretary for Justice, Parliamentary Secretary for Planning, Shadow Minister for Community Services, Children, Youth Affairs, Youth Justice and Seniors and Ageing, Minister for Families and Children, Early Childhood Education and Youth Affairs, and Minister for Health and Ambulance Services.

In March 2020, she was appointed Deputy Leader of the Government in the Legislative Council.

In April 2020, Mikakos was appointed as the Minister for the Coordination of Health and Human Services COVID-19 as part of the Victorian Government's response to the coronavirus global pandemic. This appointment followed media coverage of comments which Mikakos made regarding a GP who tested positive for COVID-19 (see Controversies below).

In Parliament, Mikakos voted against the human cloning bill but for stem cell research, for abortion decriminalisation, for assisted reproductive technology reforms and for dying with dignity laws. These bills were subject to conscience votes in the Labor Party.

Mikakos is a member of Labor's left faction.

Mikakos resigned as Minister for Health and from the Legislative Council on 26 September 2020.

== Controversies ==
=== Misuse of taxpayer funds ===
In 2003, Mikakos was criticised for nepotism after employing her sister Nikki in her taxpayer-funded electoral office.

In 2005, Mikakos was forced to pay back taxpayer funds spent mailing Labor Party members on Parliamentary stationery for reelection support, which led to Premier Steve Bracks warning Labor MPs regarding the conduct.

In 2014, Mikakos was again involved in applying taxpayer funds for political purposes, and the Victorian Ombudsman found that Mikakos was among a number of Labor MPs who had misused $388,000 in taxpayer funds for election campaigning. Mikakos declined to be interviewed by police in connection with the affair, which became known as the "red shirts rort". The Labor party later repaid the amount.

=== Youth justice ===
In 2016, a number of criminals under the age of 18 in custody at Parkville prison engaged in a violent riot and caused significant property damage, forcing staff to flee. Mikakos, then the Minister for Youth Affairs, was criticised for losing control of youth justice. Later, Mikakos illegally moved the relevant inmates to an adult prison, and was forced to reverse that decision by the Supreme Court of Victoria.

=== Remarks in Parliament ===
In 2018, Mikakos was suspended from Parliament for a day after accusing Liberal MPs of racism. Suspension involves forfeiture of the member's salary for the day.

=== Handling of the COVID-19 pandemic ===
Early in the COVID-19 pandemic, Mikakos was criticised for attacking a Melbourne GP who attended work after travelling to the United States. The Minister stated that she was 'flabbergasted' a doctor with 'flu-like symptoms' had presented to work, despite the GP not meeting her own departmental guidelines for testing. The Minister was criticised for inaccuracies, violating patient privacy and maligning frontline health workers, but refused to apologise.

Later, in April 2020, Mikakos was involved in controversy when she defended a comparison between COVID-19 and Captain Cook.

In June 2020, a breakdown in hotel quarantine procedures created a second wave of COVID-19 cases in Victoria, leading to the first total lockdown of residents in homes in Australia, panic buying, and military personnel called in. The resurgence occurred despite a report from experts a month earlier warning of an opportunity to prevent a further outbreak; Mikakos claimed she was unsure whether her government had received a copy of the report and attempted to distance herself from the scandal. In August 2020, Mikakos was stripped of responsibility for hotel quarantine.

In August 2020, Mikakos was criticised for providing inadequate and insufficient PPE to hospital staff. Mikakos claimed that only 10-15% of healthcare workers with COVID-19 became infected through their workplace, and the government was later forced to correct that figure to 70-80%.

Beginning in March 2020, Mikakos resisted calls to resign for her handling of the pandemic, including from the medical profession, the opposition, and the disgraced Health Workers Union. In August 2020, Mikakos was criticised for declining to answer questions in Parliament and for failing to meet Parliamentary deadlines to provide promised written responses to questions. She stated that she was declining to answer questions relating to the breakdown of hotel quarantine until a result came out of the independent inquiry led by former Justice Jennifer Coate. Justice Coate announced that the inquiry did not prevent any person from commenting publicly or answering questions on the matters covered by the inquiry. Under the convention of individual ministerial responsibility in the Westminster system, Ministers are expected to be accountable to Parliament, including by answering questions, and to resign for major failures in their department regardless of whether they were aware of them.

On 24 September 2020, Mikakos appeared before the board of inquiry into the hotel quarantine program, where she stated that she had not made the decision to use private security contractors to manage the quarantine program, and had not been aware of the arrangement until an outbreak at a Melbourne hotel became apparent in mid-May. Footage emerged of Mikakos at a media briefing on 29 March with jobs minister Martin Pakula as he announced that security guards would be used to patrol hotels, and media also reported that the premier's office had sent a briefing note to caucus outlining this arrangement. Mikakos tendered a supplementary statement on 25 September, denying that she had misled the inquiry and reiterating that she cannot remember about the matters raised.

Premier Daniel Andrews faced the inquiry on 25 September, at which he stated that he regarded Mikakos as "accountable" for the program. The following day, Mikakos resigned from cabinet. Mikakos made a statement suggesting that the reason for her resignation was that she disagreed with "elements" of the Premier's statement, and was no longer able to serve in his cabinet.

== Personal life ==
Jenny Mikakos attended Ivanhoe Girls' Grammar School and then the University of Melbourne where she obtained arts and law degrees. Before her election to Parliament, Mikakos worked as a commercial and tax lawyer at top-tier accounting firm Coopers & Lybrand and law firm King & Wood Mallesons, as well as Jerrard & Stuk.

Political offices
| Preceded by Wendy Lovell as Minister for Children and Early Childhood Development | Minister for Families and Children; 2014–2018 | Succeeded by Luke Donnellan as Minister for Child Protection |
| Preceded by Ryan Smith | Minister for Youth Affairs; 2014–2018 | Succeeded by Gabrielle Williams as Minister for Youth |
| Preceded by Jill Hennessy | Minister for Health; 2018–2020 | Succeeded by Martin Foley |
| Preceded by Jill Hennessy | Minister for Ambulance Services; 2018–2020 | Succeeded by Martin Foley |
