= Theo Theophanous =

Australian politician (born 1948)

The Honourable Theo Theophanous

Minister for Industry and Trade
- In office August 2007 – December 2008
- Premier: John Brumby
- Succeeded by: Martin Pakula

Minister for Major Projects
- In office 1 December 2006 – 24 December 2008
- Premier: John Brumby
- Succeeded by: Tim Pallas

Minister for Information and Communication Technology
- In office 3 August 2007 – 24 December 2008
- Premier: John Brumby
- Succeeded by: John Lenders

Minister for Industry and State Development
- In office December 2006 – August 2007
- Premier: Steve Bracks

Minister for Resources
- In office December 2002 – December 2006
- Premier: Steve Bracks

Minister for Energy Industries
- In office December 2002 – December 2006
- Premier: Steve Bracks

Minister for Small Business
- In office January 1992 – October 1992
- Premier: Joan Kirner

Minister for Consumer Affairs
- In office August 1991 – October 1992
- Premier: Joan Kirner

Member of the Victorian Legislative Council for Jika Jika Province
- In office October 1988 – November 2002

Member of the Victorian Legislative Council for Northern Metropolitan Region
- In office November 2002 – December 2008

Personal details
- Born: Theo Charles Theophanous; 16 June 1948 (age 78) Cyprus
- Party: Labor Party
- Education: La Trobe University
- Profession: politician

Theo Charles Theophanous (born 16 June 1948) is a former Australian politician. He entered politics in 1988 as a member of the Victorian Legislative Council. Theophanous served from 1988 to 2006 as one of the two members for Jika Jika Province, before the reforms to the Victorian Legislative Council that introduced proportional representation. He served as a Minister in the Kirner Government and as the leader of the opposition in the Legislative Council from 1993 until 1999. From 2006 until 2010 he represented the Northern Metropolitan Region and served as Minister in the Bracks and Brumby Governments.

Before entering Parliament he was active in Labor Party (ALP) politics in the federal electorate of Batman and published his views about Ethnicity and Politics in Northcote. He was active in the Socialist Left (SL) faction of the Victorian ALP.

In 1995 he was a candidate for ALP preselection for the seat of Batman for the 1996 Federal election, but withdrew due to pressure from within the party for the preselection to be given to then Australian Council of Trade Unions (ACTU) President Martin Ferguson.

Despite a public campaign to "Let Batman Vote", Theophanous withdrew after threats that the National Executive of the ALP would intervene to overturn any local vote and give the preselection to Ferguson.

Theophanous' withdrawal from the Batman preselection meant that he was not able to join his brother Andrew Theophanous in Federal Parliament. Ironically Martin Ferguson joined his own brother Laurie Ferguson in Federal Parliament.

In 1996, Theophanous’ supporters moved a motion of no confidence in the leadership of the Socialist Left faction. This motion was defeated by a narrow margin in a meeting of more than 500 members. Theophanous then walked out of the Socialist Left meeting and left the faction.

Theophanous then formed the Labor Renewal Alliance (LRA) with support from Greek, Latin American and Lebanese branches. The LRA allied itself and eventually merged with the Labor Unity Faction. This dramatically changed the balance of power in the Victorian Labor Party, with Labor Unity and the LRA gaining control of the Australian Labor Party.

With the election of the Bracks government in 1999, Theophanous was made Parliamentary Secretary. He was appointed Minister for Energy and Resources after the 2002 Victorian election.

Theophanous resigned as a Minister in December 2008. He was subsequently cleared of allegations against him; he then resigned from Parliament in February 2010. Since retirement from politics, Theophanous has been an active board member, political commentator, and charity advocate.

== Early life ==
Theo Charles Theophanous is a Cypriot Australian who was born on 16 June 1948 in Cyprus and emigrated to Melbourne Australia in 1954. He grew up in Broadmeadows and attended Glenroy High School. Theophanous worked as a Branch Manager for the Gas and Fuel Corporation in the 1970s. In 1980 he attended La Trobe University where he completed a double honours degree in Politics and Sociology achieving First Class Honours. He subsequently tutored at La Trobe University in both Politics and Sociology.

He is Greek Orthodox.

== Political career ==
=== Cain-Kirner years (1988–1992) ===
Theo Theophanous was first elected to Victorian Parliament in October 1988 with the re-election of the Cain Government. He served as the Chair of the Economic & Budget Committee before being appointed as Minister for Consumer Affairs and Minister for Small Business under the Kirner Government. He introduced Sunday Trading and Consumer Protection Legislation. He is the first Minister of Greek background in the Victorian Parliament.

=== Kennett years (1992–1999) ===
Theo Theophanous served as the Leader of the Opposition in the Victorian Legislative Council from 1993 to 1999. Theophanous also serves as Shadow Minister for WorkCover, and led the opposition to Kennett government changes. Theophanous authored the "Economic and financial management of Victoria under Labor" analysis, which recommended financial management principles that were adopted by the ALP in the lead up to the 1999 election.

=== Bracks years (1999–2007) ===
During the first term of the Bracks Labor Government, Theo Theophanous served as Parliamentary Secretary for Education, Employment and Training, and Parliamentary Secretary for Innovation, Industry, and Regional Development.

After the re-election of the Bracks Government in 2002, Theophanous was appointed Minister for Industry and State Development and Minister for Major Projects. He introduced the Victorian Renewable Energy Target Scheme and the Basslink Electricity Connection between Victoria and Tasmania during this time.

=== Brumby years (2007–2010) ===
During the Brumby Government between 2007 and his resignation as a Minister in December 2008, Theo Theophanous was Minister for Industry and Trade, Minister for Major Projects and Minister for Information, Communication and Technology. Theophanous was the Minister responsible for the construction of the Melbourne Recital Centre, Melbourne Rectangular Stadium, the Melbourne Convention Centre, the supercomputer at Melbourne University and the La Trobe University Research Centre. Theophanous developed the airline industry in Victoria through the introduction of Etihad Airways, Tiger Airways, Qatar Airways, and Emirates flights to Melbourne.

== Exit from politics ==
In December 2008 Theo Theophanous resigned as a Minister in the Brumby Government as a result of impending court proceedings based on an allegation by a woman living in Greece of an incident of rape 10 years earlier.

On 24 July 2009, the charge against him was dismissed after the magistrate ruled that 'the prosecution's case was not sustainable on the evidence at any level" and that it lacked "credibility, reliability and truthfulness". The magistrate criticized the complainant for "possible coercion" of witnesses and the Victoria Police for "benign acceptance of her allegations without objectivity", describing the complainant's evidence as "unreliable" and "concocted".

Theophanous subsequently asked the Greek authorities to pursue charges of criminal defamation against the complainant in an Athens court, claiming the woman had concocted the allegation in an attempt to gain financial benefit. The court found the complainant guilty and sentenced her to 3 years jail (suspended). An appeal was filed in October 2010 which was subsequently heard in a superior Athens court, however the original conviction for criminal defamation was upheld albeit with a reduced 2 years sentence.

Theophanous sought an adjudication from the Australian Press Council in relation to articles published in The Age newspaper which he claimed were false and based in part on an undisclosed conflict of interest by Age journalist Carolyn Webb who was a friend of the complainant. The Australian Press Council upheld the major complaints by Theophanous and their findings were made public on 30 July 2010. The Age newspaper and Victoria Police were subsequently criticised by the Herald Sun. This was followed by further critical comment published by the VexNews website.

Theo Theophanous resigned from Parliament in February 2010 after 22 years of public service.

== Post-political career ==
Since leaving politics, Theo Theophanous has served on the board of National Information Communication Technology Australia (NICTA) and the Metropolitan Planning Authority (MPA) Board. He was appointed Ambassador on charitable basis for the Baker IDI Heart and Diabetes Institute. Theophanous is an active political and social commentator in major Australian newspapers.

Theophanous has contributed op-eds in journals such as the Sydney Morning Herald, The Age, The Herald Sun, Cyprus Mail, and Neos Kosmos.

In 2023 Theophanous resigned from the board of the Victorian State Trustees after an Independent Broad-based Corruption Commission investigation found he had behaved improperly in lobbying for a Chinese consortium.

== Family ==
Theophanous' brother Andrew Theophanous was a former Labor federal politician. Theo's daughter Kat Theophanous is the state Labor member for Northcote since 2018.
